= List of ambassadors of Canada to Germany =

Ambassador of Canada to Germany
- Incumbent; Vera Alexander since September 18, 2025
- Global Affairs Canada
- Seat: Canada House, Berlin
- Nominator: Prime Minister of Canada
- Appointer: Governor General of Canada
- Term length: At His Majesty's pleasure
- Inaugural holder: Thomas Clayton Davis
- Formation: October 27, 1950

The ambassador of Canada to Germany is the official representative of the government of Canada to the government of Germany. The official title for the ambassador is Ambassador Extraordinary and Plenipotentiary of Canada to the Federal Republic of Germany. The current ambassador of Canada to Germany is Vera Alexander, who was appointed on the advice of Prime Minister Mark Carney.

The Embassy of Canada is located at Leipziger Platz 17, 10117 Berlin, Germany.

== History of diplomatic relations ==
Canada had no diplomatic mission to Germany before the Second World War, though it had immigration agents in the country as early as 1872, when Wilhelm Hespeler was sent to Berlin as the Dominion of Canada's official immigration agent for several months. German laws from before the First World War against the solicitation of emigrants delayed the establishment of a permanent immigration office by Canada until 1923. W.G. Fisher was appointed as Canada's first trade commissioner to Germany in 1910, with an office in Hamburg, which relocated to Berlin before closing in 1914 for the duration of the war. The Hamburg trade office was re-opened in 1922 with Leolyn Dana Wilgress as trade commissioner. It again moved to Berlin in 1938, and both it and the immigration office were closed in 1939 during the Second World War. In 1946, after the end of the war, a trade office was established in Frankfurt, and various immigration offices were also established.

In January 21, 1946, the Canadian government established the Canadian Military Mission to the Allied Control Council in Berlin and appointed Lt.-Gen. Maurice Pope, who was responsible both to the Department of External Affairs and the Department of National Defence, as its first head.

By order-in-council, the Canadian government decided, on November 22, 1949, to establish a diplomatic mission in Bonn, the capital of the new Federal Republic of Germany (West Germany). The mission operated under the auspices of the Canadian Military Mission to the Allied Control Council until July 10, 1951, when the Canadian mission in Bonn was upgraded to an embassy with Thomas Clayton Davis as Canada's first Ambassador to West Germany. Canada established diplomatic relations with the German Democratic Republic (East Germany) on August 1, 1975, but never opened an embassy. Instead, Canada's Ambassador to Poland based in Warsaw was accredited as Ambassador to the German Democratic Republic from 1976 until 1990, when the GDR was dissolved and united with West Germany. In 1999, the Canadian Embassy moved from Bonn to Berlin as a result of Germany relocating the seat of government to that city in the same year.

== List of ambassadors of Canada to Germany ==
No.	Name	Term of office			Career	Prime Minister nominated by	Ref.
No.	Name	Start Date	PoC.	End Date	Career	Prime Minister nominated by	Ref.
–	Maurice Arthur Pope (Head of Mission)	November 22, 1949	December 15, 1949		Career	Louis St. Laurent (1948–1957)	
1	Thomas Clayton Davis	July 12, 1950	October 27, 1950		Non-Career	Louis St. Laurent (1948–1957)	
2	Charles Stewart Almon Ritchie	March 25, 1954		January 5, 1958	Career	Louis St. Laurent (1948–1957)	
3	Escott Meredith Reid	November 22, 1957			Career	John G. Diefenbaker (1957–1963)	
4	John Kennett Starnes	May 28, 1962			Career	John G. Diefenbaker (1957–1963)	
5	Richard Plant Bower	February 23, 1966	July 14, 1966	February 13, 1970	Career	Lester B. Pearson (1963–1968)	
6	Gordon Gale Crean	December 4, 1969	February 27, 1970	July 18, 1975	Career	Pierre Elliott Trudeau (1968–1979 & 1980–1984)	
7	John Gelder Horler Halstead	July 17, 1975	October 31, 1975	September 29, 1980	Career	Pierre Elliott Trudeau (1968–1979 & 1980–1984)	
8	Klaus Goldschlag	July 10, 1980	October 9, 1980		Career	Pierre Elliott Trudeau (1968–1979 & 1980–1984)	
9	Donald Sutherland McPhail	October 13, 1983	September 16, 1988		Career	Pierre Elliott Trudeau (1968–1979 & 1980–1984)	
10	Thomas Delworth	November 26, 1987		September 7, 1992	Career	Brian Mulroney (1984–1993)	
11	Paul Heinbecker	August 27, 1992	October 13, 1992	August 30, 1996	Career	Brian Mulroney (1984–1993)	
12	Gaëtan Lavertu	June 3, 1996	September 18, 1996		Career	Jean Chrétien (1993–2003)	
13	Marie Bernard-Meunier	June 26, 2000	October 19, 2000		Career	Jean Chrétien (1993–2003)	
14	Paul Dubois	May 19, 2004	October 12, 2004	July 2008	Career	Paul Martin (2003–2006)	
15	Peter Boehm	July 4, 2008	September 15, 2008	December 30, 2012	Career	Stephen Harper (2006–2015)	
16	Marie Gervais-Vidricaire	August 16, 2013	September 27, 2013	April 7, 2017	Career	Stephen Harper (2006–2015)	
17	Stéphane Dion	May 1, 2017	June 6, 2017	August 24, 2022	Non-Career	Justin Trudeau (2015–2025)	
–	Isabelle Poupart (Chargée d’affaires a.i.)	December 2022		October 31, 2023	Career	Justin Trudeau (2015–2025)	
18	John Horgan	November 1, 2023	December 8, 2023	November 12, 2024	Non-Career	Justin Trudeau (2015–2025)	
19	Vera Alexander	September 18, 2025	November 20, 2025		Career	Mark Carney (2025–present)	

== See also ==
- Canada–Germany relations
- Canada House (Berlin)
- Embassy of Germany, Ottawa
