= James Scott Macdonald =

Canadian diplomat

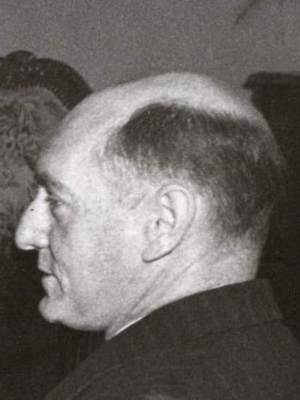

Canadian Ambassador to Austria
- In office 1957–1961
- Preceded by: Gordon Edwin Cox
- Succeeded by: Klaus Goldschlag

Canadian Ambassador to Yugoslavia
- In office 1951–1956
- Preceded by: Gordon Gale Crean
- Succeeded by: George Ignatieff

Canadian Ambassador to Brazil
- In office 1948–1951
- Preceded by: Evan Benjamin Rogers
- Succeeded by: Ephraim Herbert Coleman

Canadian High Commissioner to the Dominion of Newfoundland
- In office 1944–1948
- Preceded by: Hugh Llewellyn Keenleyside
- Succeeded by: Paul Augustus Bridle

Personal details
- Born: 1896; Goldenville, Nova Scotia
- Died: 3 September 1985; Amherstview, Ontario
- Resting place: Riverside Cemetery, Napanee
- Spouse: Caroline Ruth Wilson
- Education: Queen's University
- Occupation: Diplomat

James Scott Macdonald (1896-1985) was a Canadian career diplomat. He was born in Goldenville, Nova Scotia. He graduated Queen's University, and served in the First World War from 1915 to 1919. He was married to Caroline Ruth Wilson (1899–1986).

== Career ==
Macdonald worked for the Department of Trade and Commerce from 1926 until 1928 and then was appointed to the Department of External Affairs in 1928, where he served in postings in Paris, Geneva, and Washington. He acted as a technical advisor on trade negotiations with France and Australia and was Secretary of the Canadian delegation at the Imperial Economic Conference of 1932. He was also acting Under-Secretary of State for External Affairs in 1937.

He served as Canadian High Commissioner to Newfoundland from 1944 to 1948, Canadian Ambassador to Brazil from 1948 to 1951, to Yugoslavia from 1951 to 1956, and to Austria from 1957 to 1961.

In the latter role, he helped facilitate the immigration to Canada of Hungarian forestry students from Sopron University who had fled to refugee camps in Austria after the Hungarian Revolution of 1956.

== Death ==
He died in Amherstview on September 3, 1985.

Diplomatic posts
Preceded by Hugh Llewellyn Keenleyside	Canadian High Commissioner to Newfoundland; 1944-1948	Succeeded by Paul Augustus Bridle
Preceded by Evan Benjamin Rogers	Canadian Ambassador to Brazil; 1948-1951	Succeeded by Ephraim Herbert Coleman
Preceded by Gordon Gale Crean	Canadian Ambassador to Yugoslavia; 1951-1956	Succeeded by George Ignatieff
Preceded by Gordon Edwin Cox	Canadian Ambassador to Austria; 1957-1961	Succeeded by Klaus Goldschlag
