= List of ambassadors of Canada to Austria =

Ambassador of Canada to Austria
- Incumbent; Troy Lulashnyk since December 20, 2021
- Seat: Embassy of Canada, Vienna
- Nominator: Prime Minister of Canada
- Appointer: Governor General of Canada
- Term length: At His Majesty's pleasure
- Inaugural holder: Victor Doré
- Formation: August 21, 1952

The Ambassador of Canada to Austria is the official representative of the Canadian government to the government of Austria. The official title for the ambassador is Ambassador Extraordinary and Plenipotentiary of Canada to the Republic of Austria. The current ambassador of Canada is Troy Lulashnyk who was appointed on the advice of Prime Minister Justin Trudeau on December 20, 2021.

The Embassy of Canada is located at Laurenzerberg 2, A-1010, Vienna, Austria.

== History of diplomatic relations ==
Diplomatic relations between Canada and Austria was established on August 9, 1952. Victor Doré was appointed as Canada's first Envoy to Austria on August 21, 1952. The first resident ambassador to Austria was James Scott Macdonald, and was appointed on September 7, 1956 when the legation was raised to embassy status. Since 1971, the Canadian ambassador is also accredited as Permanent Representative to the International Organizations in Vienna.

== Head of mission ==
No.	Name	Term of office			Career	Prime Minister nominated by	Ref.
No.	Name	Start Date	PoC.	End Date	Career	Prime Minister nominated by	Ref.
1	Victor Doré (Envoy)	August 21, 1952	September 9, 1952	October 31, 1953	Non-Career	Louis St. Laurent (1948-1957)	
—	Arthur Julian Andrew (Chargé d'Affaires)	January 15, 1953		September 1954	Career	Louis St. Laurent (1948-1957)	
2	George Loranger Magann (Envoy)	June 10, 1954		January 10, 1957	Career	Louis St. Laurent (1948-1957)	
—	Gordon Edwin Cox (Chargé d'Affaires)	December 11, 1954		October 26, 1956	Career	Louis St. Laurent (1948-1957)	
3	James Scott Macdonald	January 10, 1957	January 10, 1957	July 29, 1961	Career	Louis St. Laurent (1948-1957)	
—	Klaus Goldschlag (Chargé d'Affaires)	July 29, 1961		February 1962	Career	John G. Diefenbaker (1957-1963)	
4	Blanche Margaret Meagher	November 30, 1961	May 1962	July 27, 1966	Career	John G. Diefenbaker (1957-1963)	
5	John Alexander McCordick	June 21, 1966	September 21, 1966	January 3, 1970	Career	Lester B. Pearson (1963-1968)	
6	Norman Frederick Henderson Berlis	December 17, 1969	February 6, 1970	July 30, 1973	Career	Pierre Elliott Trudeau (1968-1979)	
7	John Alan Beesley	July 19, 1973			Career	Pierre Elliott Trudeau (1968-1979)	
8	Thomas Lemesurier Carter	July 27, 1976	September 21, 1976	October 18, 1979	Career	Pierre Elliott Trudeau (1968-1979)	
9	Maurice D. Copithorne	September 27, 1979	November 12, 1979	October 3, 1982	Career	Joe Clark (1979–1980)	
10	Alan William Sullivan	September 3, 1982	January 10, 1983		Career	Pierre Elliott Trudeau (1980-1984)	
11	Michael Shenstone	September 12, 1985	November 22, 1985	September 14, 1990	Career	Brian Mulroney (1984-1993)	
12	Edward Graham Lee	September 12, 1990	September 20, 1990	March 15, 1993	Career	Brian Mulroney (1984-1993)	
13	Peter F. Walker	January 5, 1993		October 18, 1997	Career	Brian Mulroney (1984-1993)	
14	Paul Dubois	July 10, 1997	December 10, 1997	April 13, 2001	Career	Jean Chrétien (1993-2003)	
15	Ingrid Marianne Hall	July 16, 2001			Career	Jean Chrétien (1993-2003)	
16	Marie Gervais-Vidricaire	August 2, 2005	October 25, 2005	August 14, 2009	Career	Paul Martin (2003-2006)	
17	John Barrett	May 14, 2009	September 14, 2009	September 27, 2013	Career	Stephen Harper (2006-2015)	
18	Mark Bailey	September 17, 2013	November 10, 2013	July 2017	Career	Stephen Harper (2006-2015)	
19	Heidi Hulan	August 17, 2017	September 10, 2017		Career	Justin Trudeau (2015-Present)	
20	Troy Lulashnyk	December 20, 2021	January 12, 2022		Career	Justin Trudeau (2015-Present)	
