= Margaret Meagher =

Canadian diplomat (1911–1999)

Blanche Margaret Meagher, OC
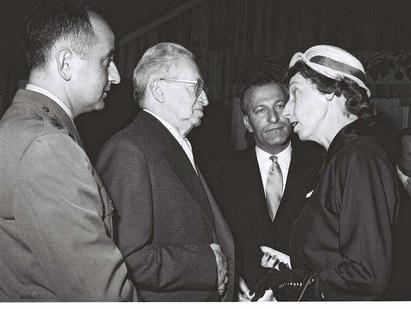
- Meagher with Israeli President Yizhak Ben-Zvi on Independence Day, 1959.
- Born: January 27, 1911; Halifax, Nova Scotia, Canada
- Died: February 25, 1999 (aged 88); Halifax, Nova Scotia, Canada
- Education: Dalhousie University (BA, MA)
- Occupation: Diplomat
- Known for: Canada's first female ambassador

Blanche Margaret Meagher, OC (January 27, 1911 – February 25, 1999) was a Canadian diplomat who became the nation's first-ever appointed female ambassador. She served as Canadian Ambassador to Israel from 1958 to 1961, Austria from 1962 to 1966, and Sweden from 1969 to 1973. She was also High Commissioner to Cyprus, Uganda and Kenya, and chaired the International Atomic Energy Agency Board of Governors from 1964 to 1965.

== Early life ==
Meagher was born in Halifax, Nova Scotia, the fifth of six children of John Nicholas and Blanche (née Seals) Meagher.

== Education ==
Meagher attended Dalhousie University on an academic scholarship, where she earned a Bachelor of Arts degree in political science in 1932. Outside the classroom, she was also an active member of the campus’ League of Nations Society. In 1935, she earned a Masters of Arts in French and German Literature from Dalhousie University and later took post-graduate studies in political science from 1937 to 1938.

== Career ==
=== Early career ===
From 1932 to 1942, Meagher was a junior high school teacher at St. Thomas Aquinas School in Halifax.

=== Diplomatic career ===
In 1942, in response to the Canadian wartime effort in World War II, the Department of External Affairs held special competitions as an "emergency measure" to recruit educated women as clerks to temporarily replace the officers who had left to fight in Europe. Meagher was one of twelve women who passed the foreign service entrance examination and became the first female diplomats to join the department. These women served in the roles of junior foreign service officers but were paid as grade-four clerks.

In 1944–45, Meagher was temporarily posted to Washington, D.C., to replace various diplomats who were recalled to assist in the repatriation of Canadian troops toward the end of the war. In 1945, she was posted to the Embassy of Canada in Mexico City, serving under Hugh Llewellyn Keenleyside. There, she formally acted as Third Secretary, but her position was described as "local rank", meaning she was considered a foreign secretary abroad but maintained her status and salary as a clerk in Ottawa.

In 1947, when the Canadian government lifted its ban on hiring female officers, Meagher passed the necessary exams and was officially appointed to Second Secretary rank in the Canadian Foreign Service. After finishing her term in Mexico, she served in Ottawa from 1949 to 1953, and attended several United Nations conferences during that time. She was then transferred to London, serving under Norman Alexander Robertson, and appointed to the rank of First Secretary (1953–1955) on the Canadian High Commission, and later to the position of Counselor (1955–1956).

=== Ambassadorial career ===
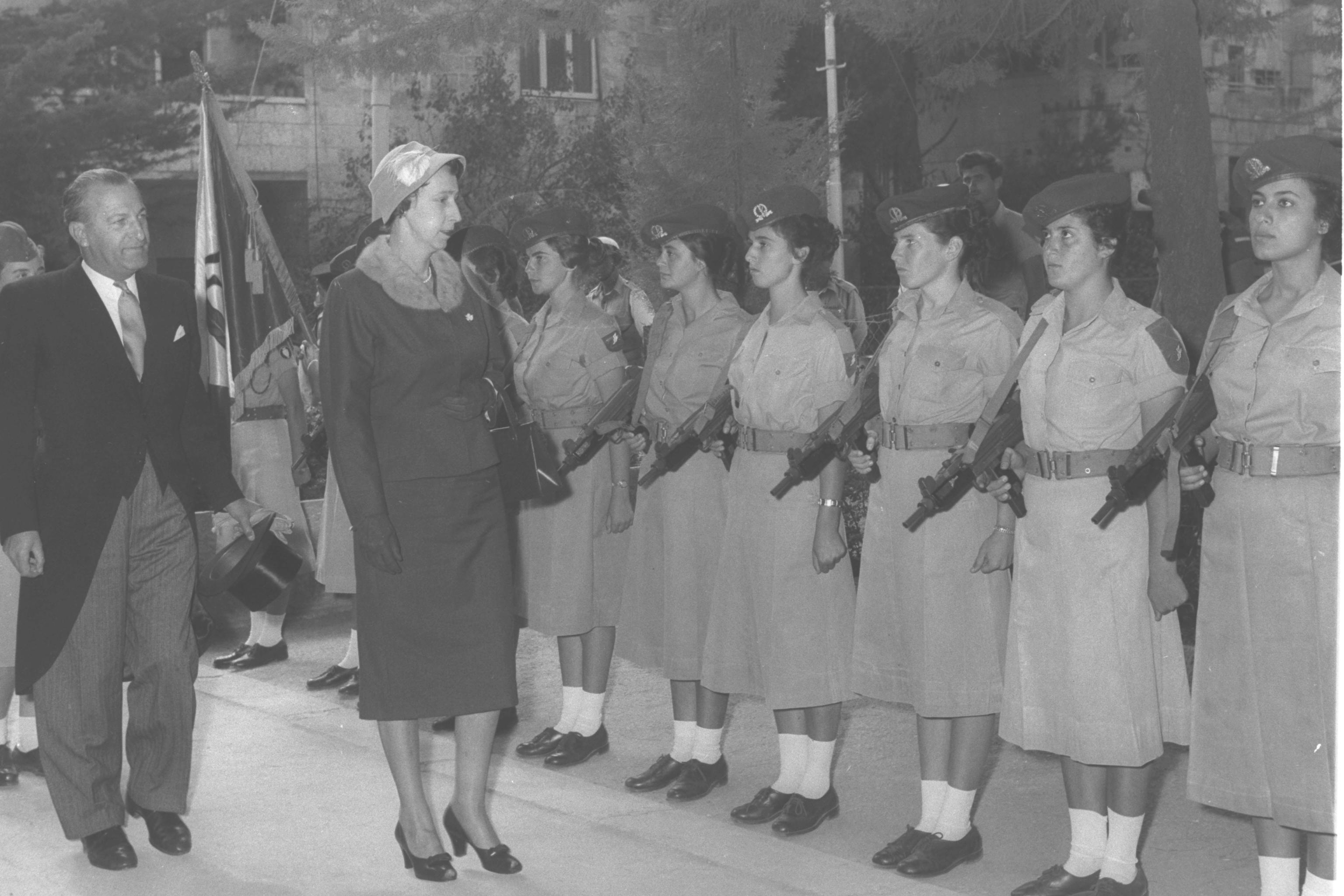
Meagher inspecting a female guard of honour on her way to present her credentials as ambassador to the president of Israel, Yitzhak Ben-Zvi, 1958.

In 1957, Meagher was appointed to Israel as chargé d’affaires, and then as the full-time resident Canadian ambassador to Israel in 1958. In this appointment, which she held until 1961, Meagher became the first Canadian woman to hold an ambassadorial position. She simultaneously served as High Commissioner to Cyprus from April to December 1961.

Meagher next became the Canadian ambassador to Austria from 1962 to 1966, and in this position was the first and only female ambassador in Vienna. During this time, she was also the Canadian representative on the International Atomic Energy Agency, of which she was later chair between 1964 and 1965. In 1967, Meagher took on the role of Canadian High Commissioner to Uganda and Kenya. She broke ground with the terms she served in Israel, Austria, Kenya, Uganda, and Cyprus, as she was the first female head of mission in each of these countries.

She later worked as Canada's ambassador to Sweden from 1969 until her retirement in 1973. During this time, she actively conducted negotiations with the People’s Republic of China and played a key role in establishing Sino-Canadian diplomatic relations by assisting in "[ironing] out Canada's recognition of communist China."

== Later life and death ==
After retirement from her diplomatic career, Meagher continued to serve in various capacities internationally and locally. In 1973, she became External Affairs’ first female foreign service visitor to Dalhousie University. In November 1974, she represented Canada at the United Nations World Food Conference, which addressed the global problem of food insecurity.

Meagher also served as a member of the National museums of Canada's board of trustees on several occasions, acting as the representative on behalf of the Atlantic Canada region. At the local level, she served in several board of governors of Nova Scotian post-secondary institutions, including the Nova Scotia College of Art and Design from 1984 to 1989, as well as the Atlantic School of Theology.

Meagher died in 1999 at the age of 88.

== Legacy ==
In light of her gender and social circumstances, Meagher's work in the Canadian Foreign Service is generally considered to have been significant in paving the way for women in diplomacy. Many believe that her career proved that women could perform diplomatically at the same level as men, which pressured the Foreign Service to continue to incorporate more women into their traditionally male-dominated diplomatic corps.

Meagher was conscious of her unique and influential position in Canadian foreign affairs. In an interview, she stated:

“Not only was I the only woman head of mission everywhere I went, there were very few women members of any rank in the diplomatic corps. [...] I was, after all, blazing a trail and whether I performed well, or fell flat on my face might have had some influence, at least for a time, on the appointment of other women.”

Because she remained single throughout her life, Meagher was able to pursue a full-time career in the Foreign Service, which would otherwise not have been permitted due to government-imposed restrictions on married women holding federal civil service jobs.

== Awards and honours ==
In 1974, Meagher was appointed an officer of the Order of Canada for her "career in diplomacy and contribution to international affairs". Some of these contributions include her diplomatic service as the first female Canadian ambassador, first woman to chair a board of governors and first female Canadian high commissioner.

Meagher had received several honorary degrees from Nova Scotian post-secondary institutions. In 1970, she was awarded the degree of Doctor of Civil Law honoris causa by Dalhousie University, her alma mater. She had also been awarded two honorary doctorates from St. Francis Xavier University and Saint Mary's University in 1974 and 1975, respectively.

Dalhousie University also developed the Margaret Meagher Fellowship in Political Science, awarded to a student entering the Master of Arts program in the field of international relations.

== Notes ==
Diplomatic posts
Preceded by Edgar D'Arcy McGreer	Ambassador Extraordinary and Plenipotentiary to Israel; 1958–1961	Succeeded by Jean-Marie Gaétan Déry
Preceded by N/A	High Commissioner to Cyprus; 1961	Succeeded by Arthur Julian Andrew
Preceded by Klaus Goldschlag	Ambassador Extraordinary and Plenipotentiary to Austria; 1962–1966	Succeeded by John Alexander McCordick
Preceded by Allan Sydney McGill	High Commissioner to Uganda; 1966–1969	Succeeded by James Murray Cook
Preceded by Allan Sydney McGill	High Commissioner to Kenya; 1967–1969	Succeeded by James Murray Cook
Preceded by Arthur Julian Andrew	Ambassador Extraordinary and Plenipotentiary to the Kingdom of Sweden; 1969–1973	Succeeded by Raymond Harry Jay
