= Embassy of Germany, Ottawa =

Diplomatic mission of Germany to Canada

Embassy of Germany in Ottawa
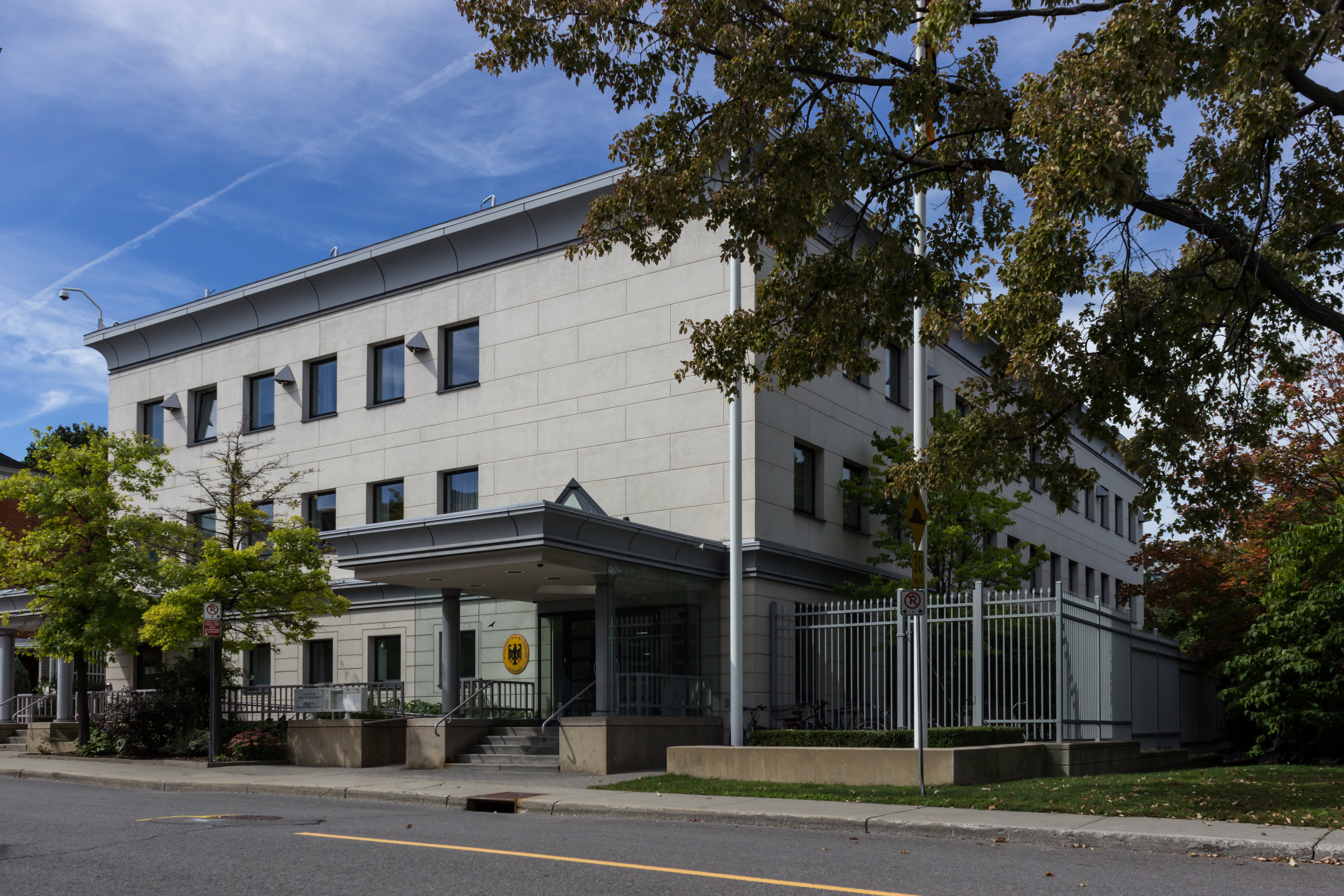
- Location: Ottawa
- Address: Waverley Street
- Coordinates: 45.418467°N 75.681794°W
- Ambassador: Matthias Lüttenberg

The Embassy of Germany in Ottawa (German: Deutsche Botschaft Ottawa) is located on Waverley Street, off Queen Elizabeth Driveway, in the Golden Triangle neighbourhood of the Canadian capital of Ottawa. The official residence of the Ambassador is in Rockcliffe Park. The current Ambassadorship to Canada from Germany is shared between Matthias Lüttenberg and Tjorven Bellmann who alternate every 8 months.

== List of Ambassadors of West Germany ==
- 1950–1951: Werner Dankwort (as Consul General)
- 1951–1956: Werner Dankwort
- 1956–1958: Hasso von Etzdorf
- 1958–1963: Herbert Siegfried
- 1963–1967: Kurt Oppler
- 1968–1970: Joachim Friedrich Ritter
- 1970–1972: Dietrich Freiherr von Mirbach
- 1972–1975: Rupprecht von Keller
- 1975–1979: Max Graf Podewils
- 1979–1983: Erich Straetling
- 1983–1990: Wolfgang Behrends

== List of Ambassadors of East Germany ==
- 1988-1990: Heinz Birch

== List of Ambassadors of Germany ==
- 1991–1993: Richard Ellerkmann
- 1993–1998: Hans-Günter Sulimma
- 1999–2001: Jürgen Pöhlmann
- 2001–2005: Christian Friedemann Pauls
- 2006–2009: Matthias Höpfner
- 2009-2012: Georg Witschel
- 2012-2017: Werner Wnendt
- 2017-2024: Sabine Sparwasser
- since 2024: Tjorven Bellmann and Matthias Lüttenberg (8 month-long alternating terms)

== See also ==
- Canada–Germany relations
- Canada House (Berlin)
- List of ambassadors of Canada to Germany
