= Maurice Pope =

Maurice Pope may refer to:

- Maurice Arthur Pope, Canadian diplomat
- Maurice Pope (linguist)
