= List of high commissioners of Canada to Newfoundland =

The Canadian High Commission to Newfoundland was opened in 1941 for purposes of co-ordinating the war effort and in particular defence during World War II. When Canada negotiated with the United Kingdom government about the appointment of Canadian High Commissioner to Newfoundland, it also asked that a reciprocal representative of Newfoundland be stationed in Ottawa. The British government refused to consider an appointment of a representative with the rank of High Commissioner as Newfoundland was no longer fully self-governing and instead suggested that the Canadian government accept an Agent-General for Newfoundland who would be appointed to both Ottawa and Washington, D.C. and that the Agent's role be confined to "supply, commercial, and technical questions" and that political matters be directed instead to the British High Commission in Ottawa. The Canadian government rejected the dual appointment and suggested the appointment of an Accredited Representative. The negotiations were never resolved.

In the late 1940s, the high commissioner was involved in negotiations that led to Newfoundland's entry into Canadian Confederation. The commission was closed when Newfoundland became part of Canada on March 31, 1949.

High Commissioner	Start of term	End of term
Charles Jost Burchell	September 1941	January 1944
Hugh Llewellyn Keenleyside (acting)	January 1944	May 1944
James Scott Macdonald	May 1944	May 1948
Paul Augustus Bridle (acting)	May 1948	September 1948
Charles Jost Burchell (second term)	September 1948	March 31, 1949

== See also ==
- High Commissioner of Newfoundland to the United Kingdom
