= Marie Gervais-Vidricaire =

Canadian former diplomat

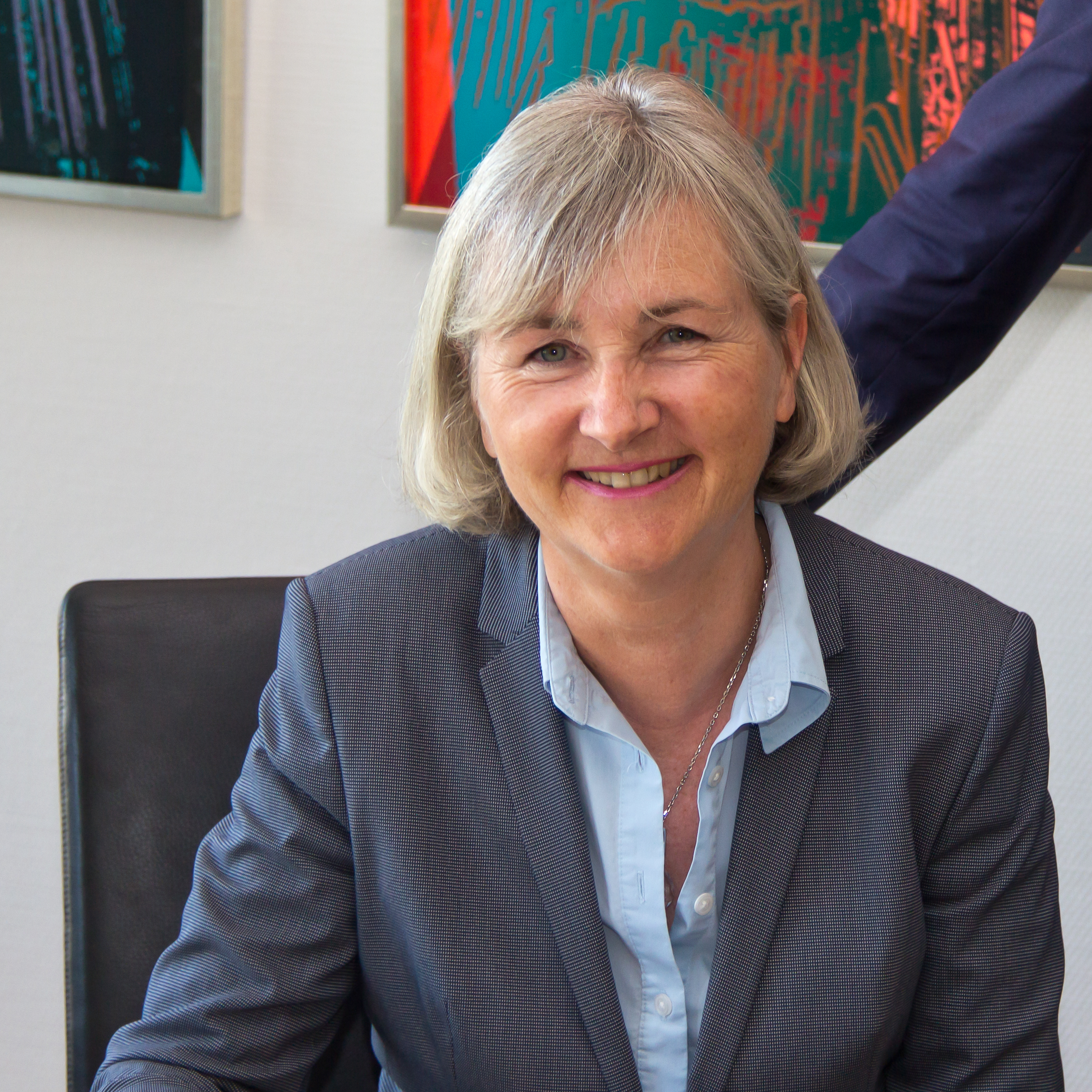

Ambassador of Canada to Germany
- In office 2013–2017
- Prime Minister: Stephen Harper; Justin Trudeau
- Preceded by: Peter Boehm
- Succeeded by: Stéphane Dion

Ambassador of Canada to Austria
- In office 2005–2009
- Prime Minister: Stephen Harper
- Preceded by: Ingrid Marianne Hall
- Succeeded by: John Barrett

Personal details
- Born: Marie Gervais-Vidricaire Montmagny, Quebec, Canada
- Education: Laval University; Institut d’études politiques de Paris; École des Hautes Études en Sciences Sociales
- Profession: Diplomat

Marie Gervais-Vidricaire is a Canadian diplomat who served as the ambassador of Canada to Germany from September 2013 to May 2017. Before that she served as the ambassador of Canada to Austria from 2005 to 2009.

== Life and career ==
She was educated at Laval University in Quebec, and also holds a Diploma of International Relations Studies from the Institut d’études politiques de Paris and a Diplôme d’études approfondies from the École des Hautes Études en Sciences Sociales in France. She speaks French, English, Spanish, German, and Italian.

In a broad-ranging diplomatic career, from 1998 to 2001 she specialized in human rights and human security issues and served as Deputy Permanent Representative at the Canadian Mission to the United Nations in Geneva and as Rapporteur of the Commission on Human Rights. She was the spokesman for the Western Group at the World Conference on Racism in Durban in 2001.

In 2002, she was Director General responsible for global issues in the Department of Foreign Affairs in Ottawa and head of the Canadian delegation to the 58th session of the Commission on Human Rights. Gervais-Vidricaire was appointed to the board of directors of Rights and Democracy in 2003.

From 2005 to 2009, she was Canada's ambassador to Austria and the Permanent Representative of Canada to the International Organisations at Vienna. Thereafter, she worked in a NATO expert group to develop a new strategic concept. From 2011 to 2013, she was chairman of the Stabilization and Reconstruction Task Force (START).

On August 23, 2013, Foreign Affairs Minister John Baird announced the appointment of Gervais-Vidricaire as the Ambassador to Germany. It was confirmed in a speech on January 31, 2017, that her successor as Ambassador to Germany will be former Minister of Foreign Affairs Stéphane Dion.
