= Joseph Pope (public servant) =

Sir Joseph Pope
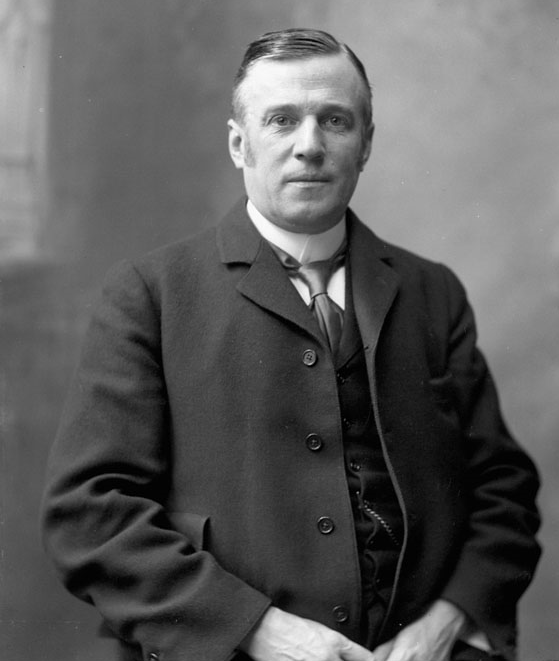
- Born: August 16, 1854; Charlottetown, Prince Edward Island
- Died: December 2, 1926 (aged 72); Ottawa, Ontario
- Occupations: Clerk, private secretary, civil servant, and author

Sir Joseph Pope KCMG CVO ISO (August 16, 1854 – December 2, 1926) was a Canadian public servant. He was Private Secretary to Sir John A. Macdonald from 1882 to 1891 and Assistant Clerk to the Privy Council & Under Secretary of State for Canada from 1896 to 1926. From 1909 to 1925, he was the first permanent under-secretary of State for External Affairs.

Pope was appointed a Companion of the Order of St Michael and St George (CMG) during the visit to Canada of TRH the Duke and Duchess of Cornwall and York (later King George V and Queen Mary) in October 1901. He was later knighted as a Knight Commander (KCMG) of the same order.

He married Marie-Louise-Joséphine-Henriette (Minette) Taschereau in Rivière-du-Loup, Que. on October 15, 1884. They had five sons and a daughter. One of his sons, Maurice Arthur Pope, later became a lieutenant general in the Canadian Army.

Pope's life story was edited and completed by his son Maurice Arthur Pope, and was published as "Public servant: the memoirs of Sir Joseph Pope" (Toronto, 1960). Sir Joseph tells the story of his conversion to the Roman Catholic faith from Anglicanism in Why I Became a Catholic, published privately in 1921, and republished by Ignatius Press in 2001.

There is a Joseph Pope fonds at Library and Archives Canada.

== Works ==
- Jacques Cartier: His Life And Voyages, (1890)
- Traditions, (1891)
- Memoirs Of The Rt Hon Sir John Alexander Macdonald, (1894)
- Confederation, being a series of hitherto unpublished documents bearing on the British North America Act (1895) [as editor]
- The Royal Tour In Canada, (1901)
- Sir John A Macdonald Vindicated, (1912)
- The Day of Sir John Macdonald: A Chronicle of The First prime minister of the Dominion (1920)
