= William Frederick Bull =

Canadian former diplomat

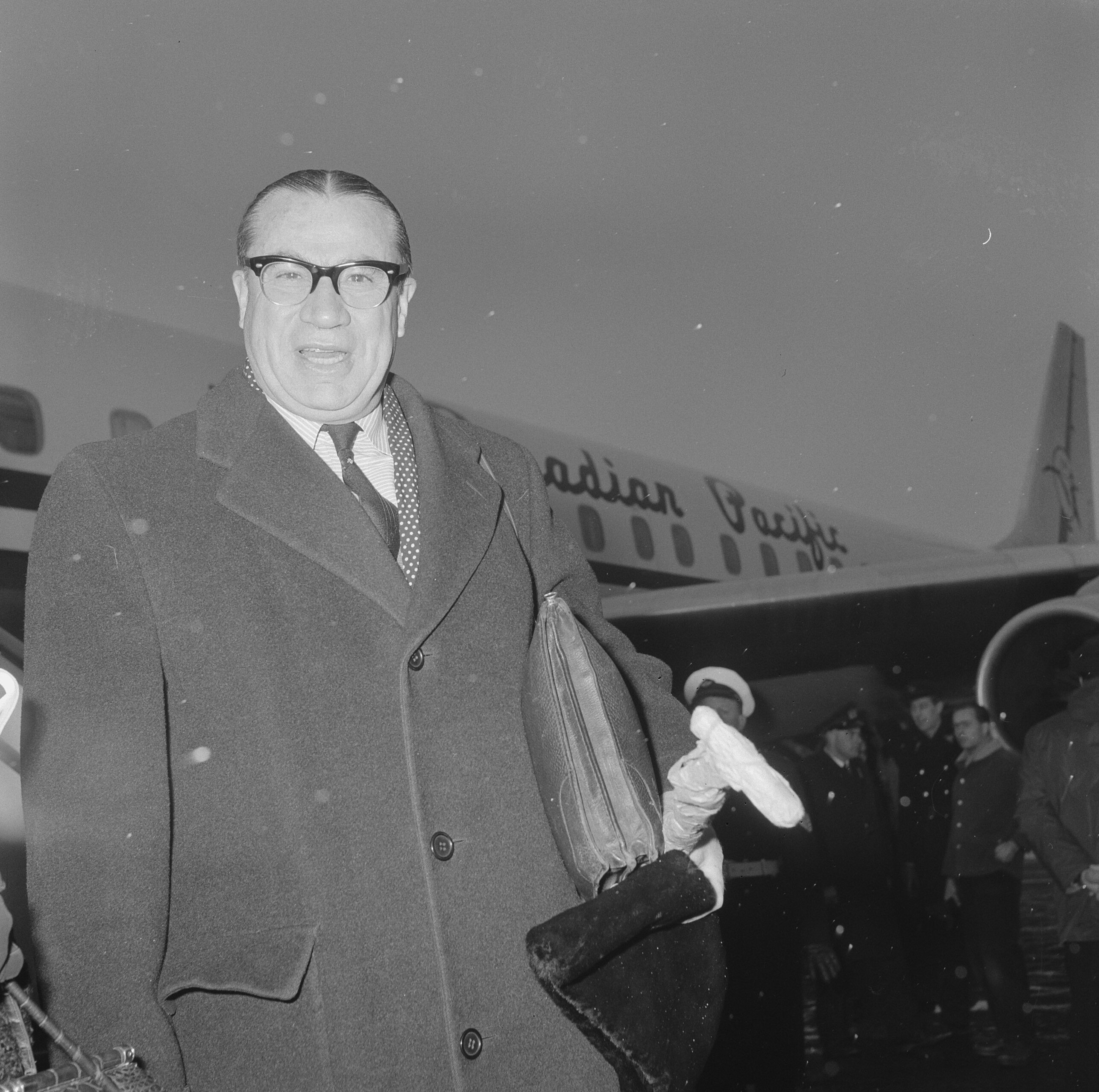
W. F. Bull arriving in The Netherlands in 1963

William Frederick Bull (December 31, 1903 – January 22, 1993) was a Canadian diplomat. He was Ambassador Extraordinary and Plenipotentiary to Japan (1957–1962) and then to the Netherlands (1962-1968).

Diplomatic posts
Preceded by Charles Pierre Hébert	Ambassador Extraordinary and Plenipotentiary to the Netherlands; 1962–1968	Succeeded by Alfred John Pick
Preceded by Theodore Francis Moorhouse Newton	Ambassador Extraordinary and Plenipotentiary to Japan; 1957–1963	Succeeded by Richard Plant Bower
