= Canada House, Berlin =

Diplomatic and office building in Germany

Embassy of Canada to Germany
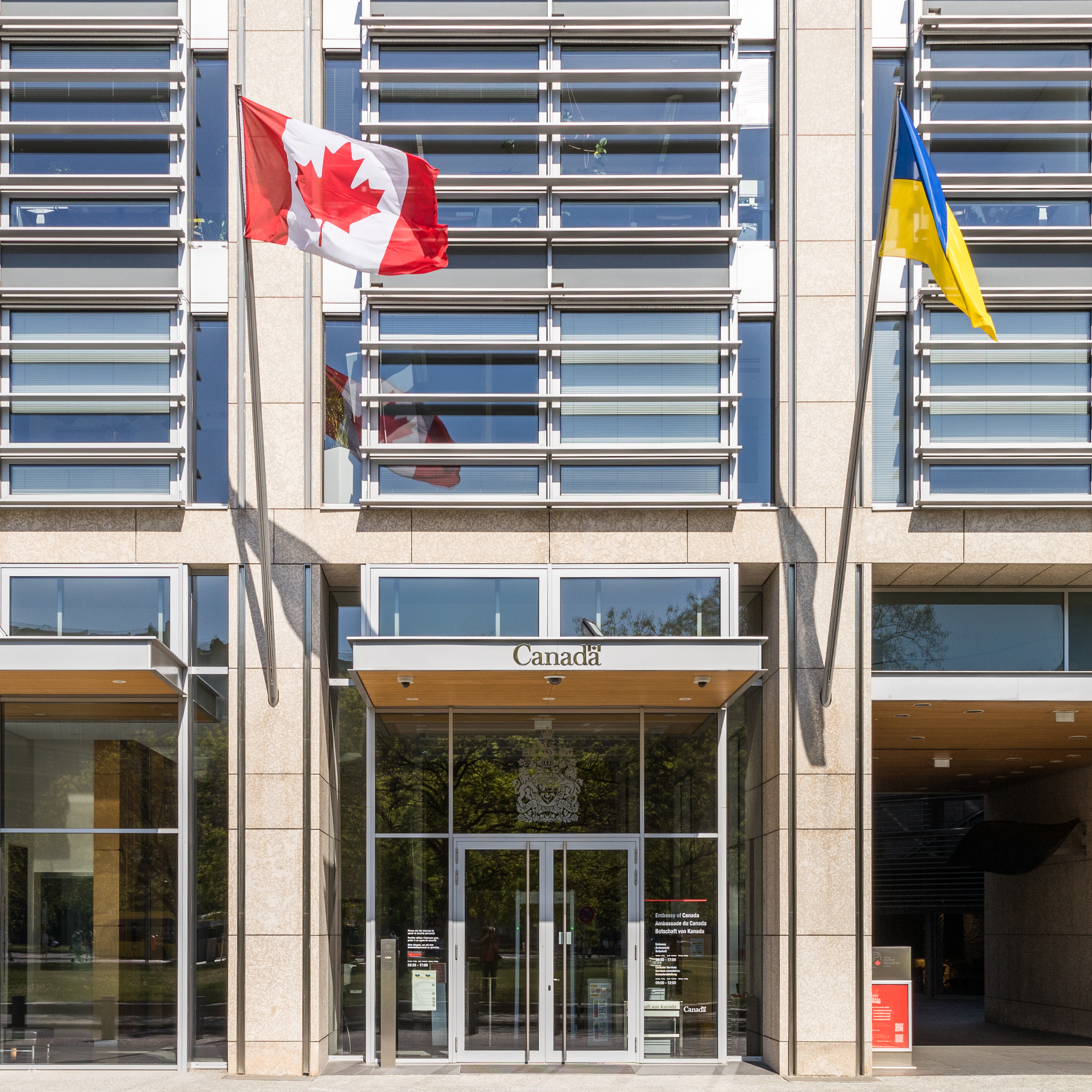
- Location: Berlin, Germany
- Address: Leipziger Platz 17
- Coordinates: 52.5103°N 13.3775°E
- Ambassador: Vera Alexander
- Website: Official website

Canada House (German: Kanada Haus) is a diplomatic and office building in Berlin. It is the location of the Embassy of Canada to Germany, which is the diplomatic mission of Canada to Germany.

== History ==
Unlike other Western nations, Canada never had an embassy in Berlin when it was the capital from 1871 to 1945 (although there was a consulate). Canada's first embassy to West Germany was in Bonn, and Canada conducted diplomatic relations with East Germany through its embassy in Warsaw.

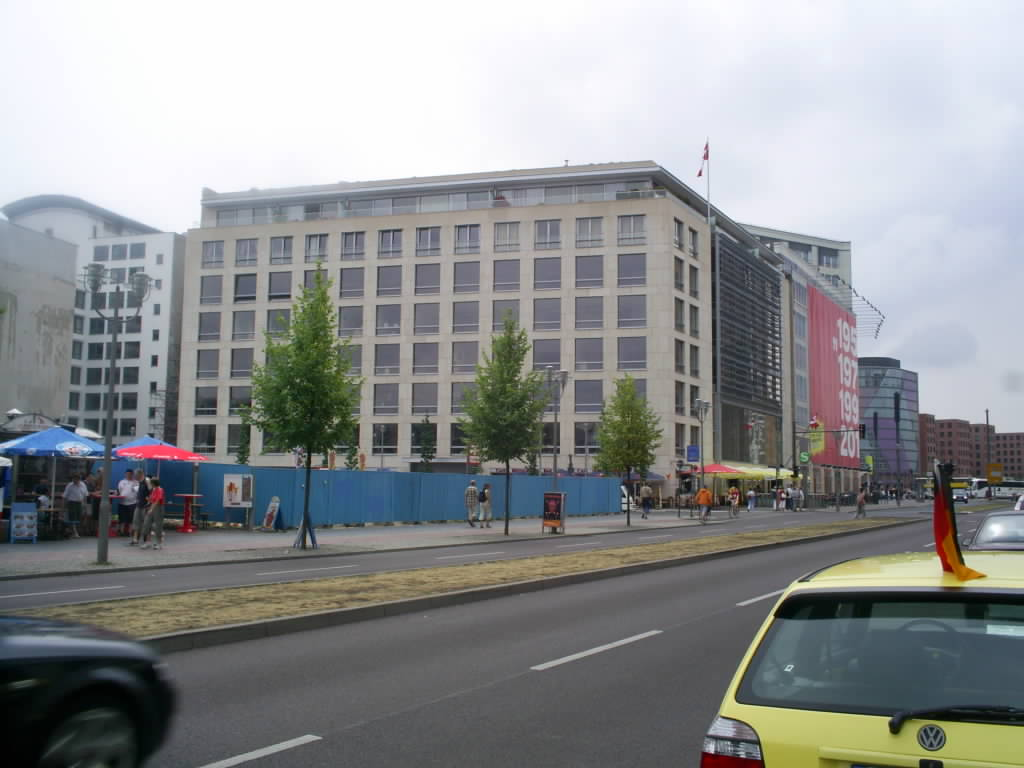
Canada House in 2005

The site of Canada House, Leipziger Platz, was once one of Europe's most elegant squares before it was damaged during the Second World War and later destroyed in preparation for construction of the Berlin Wall.

The design for the new embassy was the subject of a national competition, for which the international jury selected the scheme proposed by Montreal-based Saucier Perrotte. However, Canada's Minister of Foreign Affairs at that time, Lloyd Axworthy, overruled the jury decision to appoint a multi-firm team headed by Kuwabara Payne McKenna Blumberg and including additional architectural firms in the ridings of both Axworthy and the then-prime minister, Jean Chrétien. The overruling of the jury decision was severely criticized by many in the Canadian design community, media and architectural press, and it was widely considered to be government interference motivated by political factors.

The new ten-storey chancery was inaugurated in April 2005 by Adrienne Clarkson, then Governor General of Canada.

== Architecture ==
It was designed by Kuwabara Payne McKenna Blumberg Architects with Gagnon Letellier Cyr architects and Smith Carter Architects + Engineers. The design has been praised by the German press for its "openness", particularly the walkway which allows pedestrians to short-cut through the property on their way to the nearby Potsdamer Platz U-Bahn station. However, this is primarily the result of German regulations.

Other features of the building include a green roof featuring a scale model of the Mackenzie River Delta, a multimedia centre with wireless internet access and interactive kiosks, and an auditorium and conference centre. Materials include Tyndall limestone from Manitoba on the exterior, with Douglas fir from British Columbia, black granite and maple from Quebec, and Eramosa marble from Ontario inside. The largest room, the "Timber Hall" is a twenty-sided multi-purpose room with a skylight.

== Building use ==
The chancery building is leased and has a mix of embassy offices in a secure zone, and private sector tenants in a public zone. About 100 Canadian diplomatic staff and locally employed personnel work at the embassy.

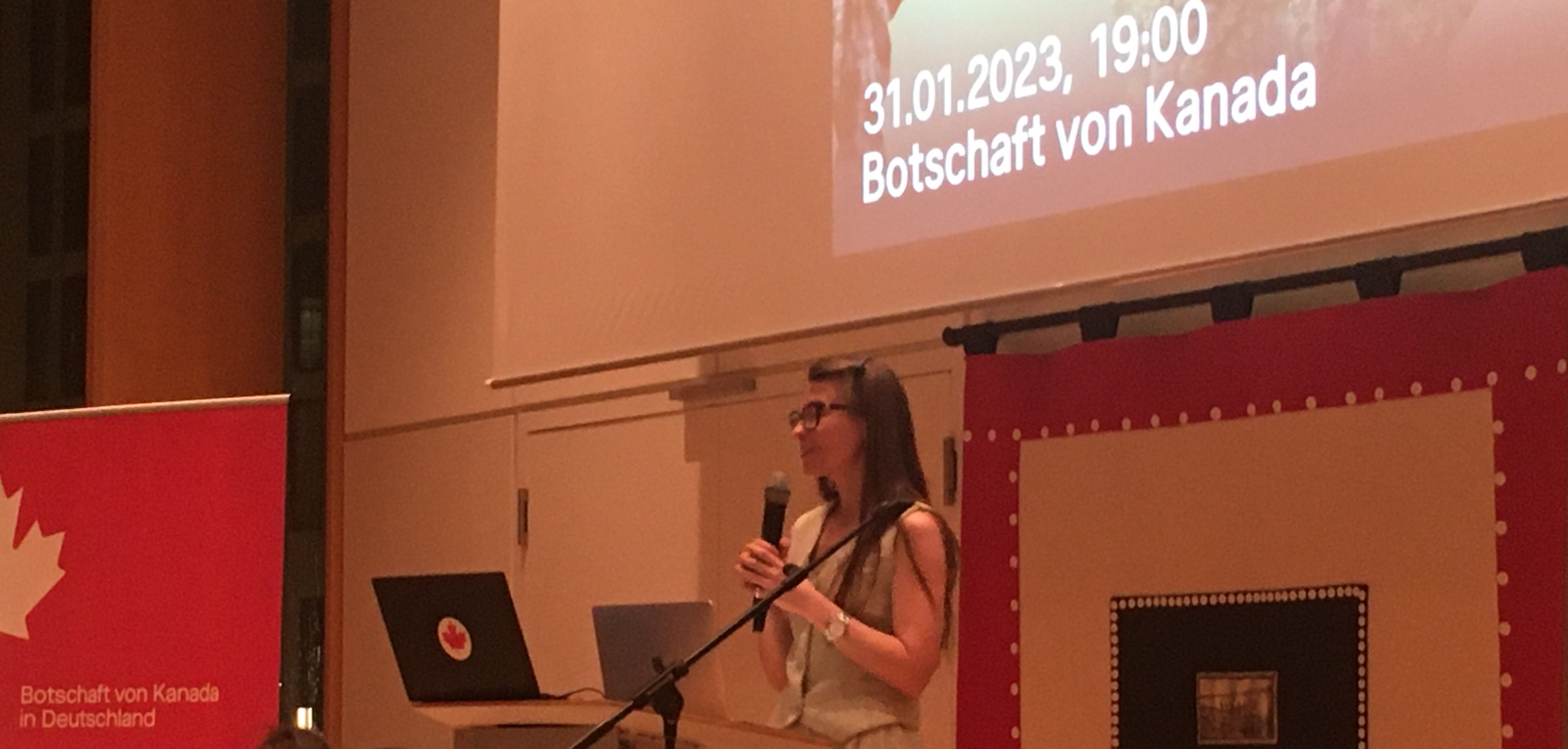
Svitlana Matviyenko presenting at Marshall McLuhan Lecture, Canadian Embassy Berlin, 2023

The media room is called the Marshall McLuhan Salon, named after Canadian media philosopher Marshall McLuhan. which includes a multimedia information centre and an auditorium. The centre hosts a permanent exhibition dedicated to McLuhan, based on its collection of film and audio items by and about him. Apart from media events, The centre also hosts screenings, presentations and lectures, like the annual Marshall McLuhan Lecture of media theorists that is always organized on the evening before the opening of transmediale festival.

It was used to host an exhibition called NDN Survival Trilogy, by Thirza Cuthand, during the Berlin International Film Festival (Berlinale) in 2022.

== Other diplomatic offices ==
Canada maintains consulates in Munich, Düsseldorf, and Stuttgart.

Additionally, the Ministère des Relations internationales du Québec maintains a representative office next to the Brandenburg Gate.

== See also ==
- Canada–Germany relations
- List of ambassadors of Canada to Germany
