= Canada–Germany relations =

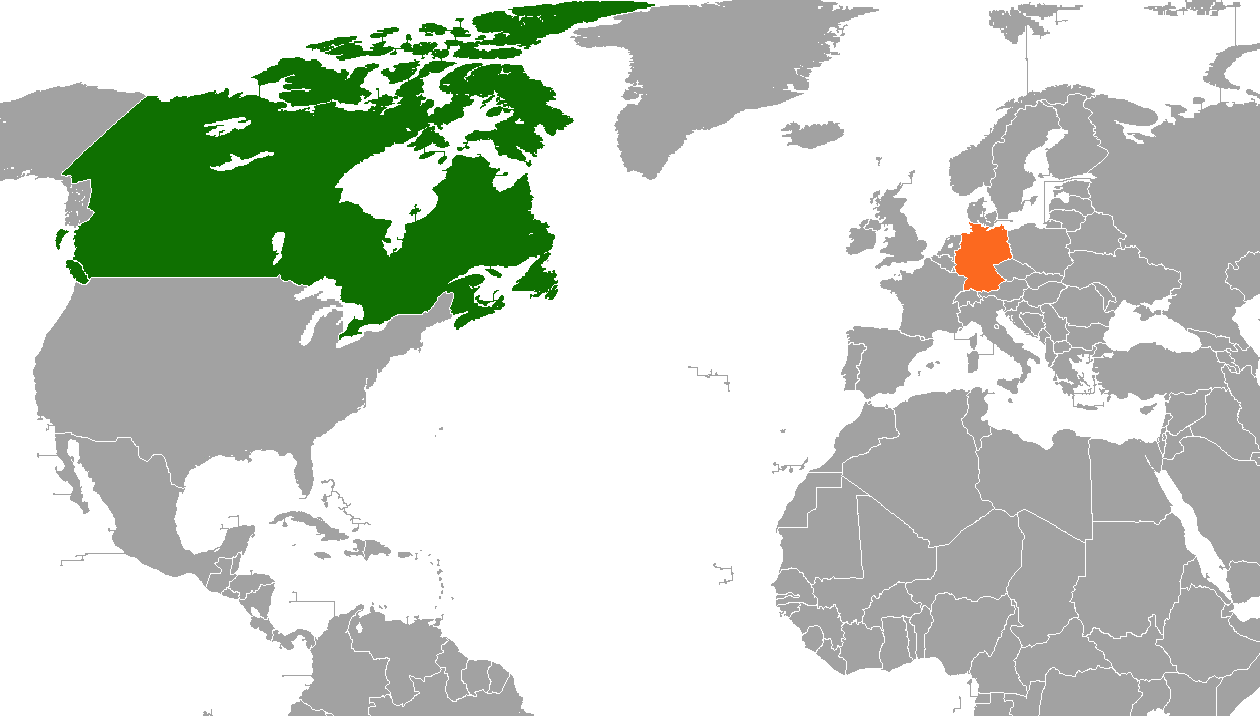

- Canada: Germany

Diplomatic mission
- Embassy of Canada, Berlin: Embassy of Germany, Ottawa

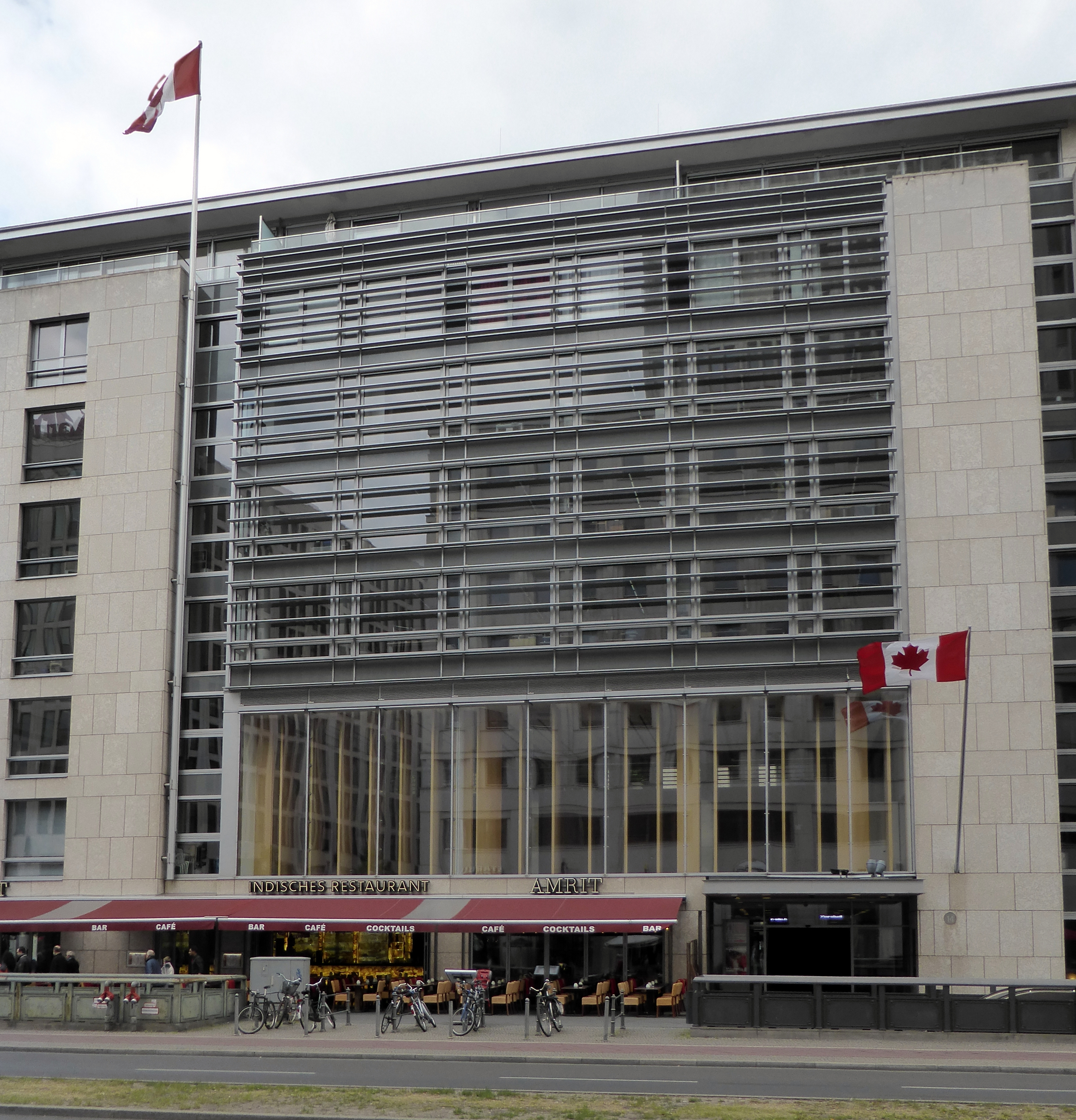
Embassy of Canada in Berlin

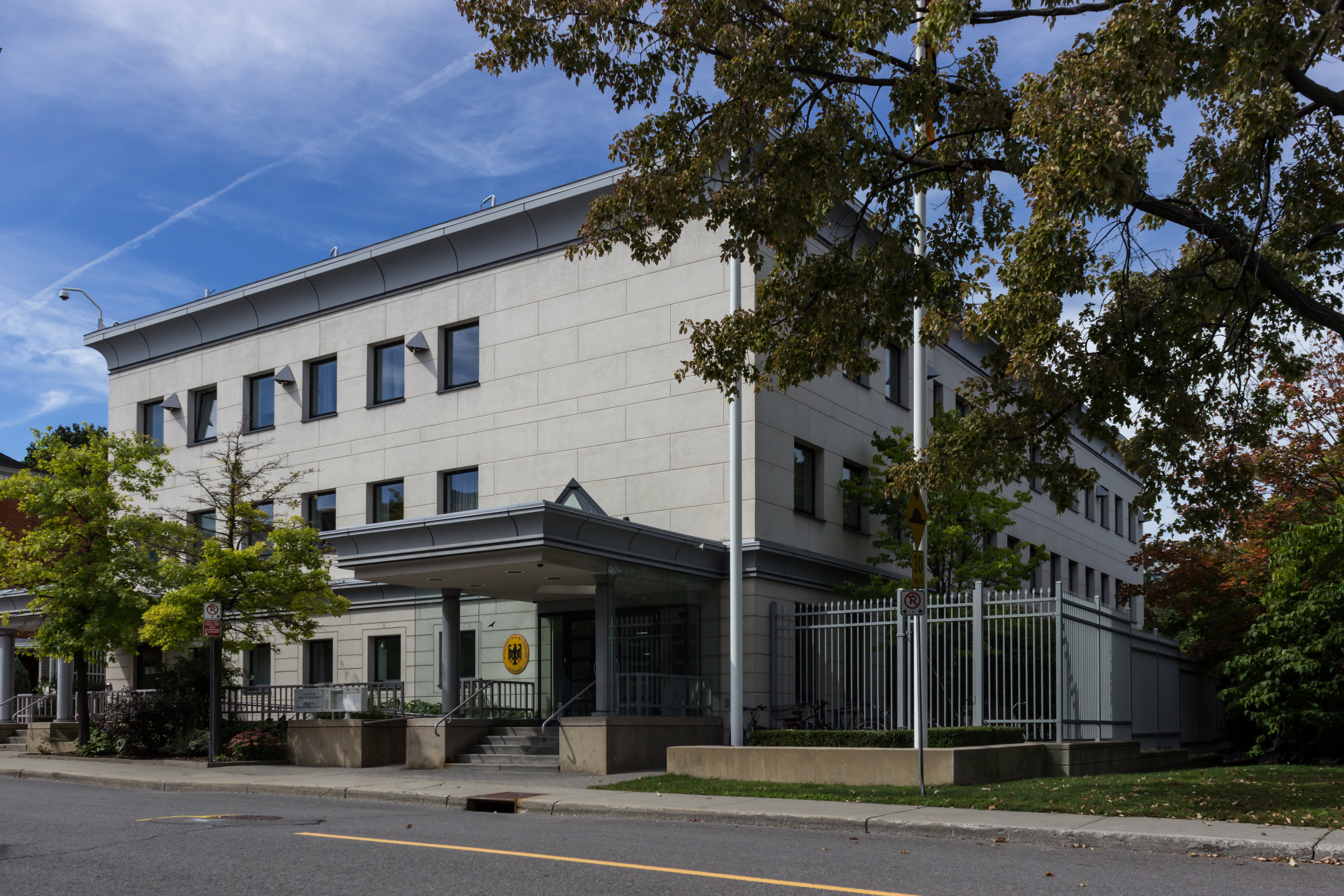
Embassy of Germany in Ottawa

Canada and Germany have positive relations, as they are close allies and fellow NATO and G7 members.

== History ==
=== Before 1776 ===
The earliest contact between Germany and Canada occurred in New France, the area of North America colonized by France in the 17th century. A number of ethnic Germans migrated to the colony during French colonial possession between 1663 and 1763, and mixed in with the French population. The first major German migration to Canada, however, was after the English conquests of Nova Scotia. A significant number of Germans served in the British invading force and subsequently elected to settle in the new lands. The colony's population was mainly French-speaking Roman Catholic Acadians. Since most British settlers preferred to settle in the warmer Southern Colonies, the British administration faced a daunting demographic problem. An aggressive plan to recruit foreign protestants began to balance the population statistics. Most of the attracted settlers came from German duchies and principalities on the Upper Rhine in the present-day Rhineland-Palatinate Bundesland. The Duchy of Württemberg was the major source of these immigrants. Because of this migration, many Nova Scotian towns on the South Shore such as Lunenburg, Kingsburg and Waterloo bear distinctly German names. Many of the names of islands, beaches and points are also German and there are many Lutheran churches.

=== 1776 to 1900 ===
There was an even larger ethnic German migration to Canada after the American Revolution, where ethnic Germans made up a large proportion of the United Empire Loyalists who fled to Canada. These loyalists and many German mercenaries hired by Britain fought to defend British North America. Some of these mercenaries decided to settle in Canada once their terms expired, and several of the Brunswick regiment settled in Quebec, southwest of Montreal and south of Quebec City. The largest group fleeing the United States were the Mennonites who were subjected to discrimination in the United States for their pacifist beliefs. They moved to what is today southwest Ontario, settling around Berlin, Ontario (now known as Kitchener). This large group also attracted new migrants from Germany drawing some 50,000 of them to the region over subsequent decades. Beginning in 1896, western Canada drew further large numbers of volksdeutsche (ethnic German) immigrants, mostly from Eastern Europe. Once again Mennonites were especially prominent, having been persecuted by the Tsarist regime in Russia for their refusal to serve in the Imperial Russian Army. Used to the harsh conditions of farming in Russia, many of these settlers were among the most successful in adapting to the Canadian prairies.

=== 1900 to Present ===
==== German plans for hypothetical wars ====
In the early 20th century, the Anglo-German naval race had repercussions on Canadian politics as the Royal Navy was forced to redeploy more and more ships to the home waters to face the growing German High Seas Fleet across the North Sea. Canada had no navy prior to 1910, and the withdrawal of British ships from North American waters left Canada's coastlines exposed. In 1906, Britain shut down its Canadian naval bases at Halifax on the Atlantic coast and Esquimalt on the Pacific coast while pulling out the last British garrisons in Canada, making Canada completely responsible for its own defense for the first time in its history. The German Navy made numerous planning exercises regarding possible wars. Several involved Canada. For example, the OP III plan for a hypothetical war with the United States called for a landing in the Maritime provinces prior to marching into New England to seize Boston. The Canadian historians' Roger Sarty and Michael Hardly called the OP III invasion plan for the conquest of the United States a "fantasy" on the part of Emperor Wilhelm II, but one that he did take seriously. As part of the plan, the German gunboat SMS Panther made a lengthy voyage in 1905-06 along both the Atlantic and Pacific coasts of the United States and Canada looking for the best places to land an invasion force and for secret anchorages where German naval forces might be resupplied. By 1908, a German Navy planning exercise reported that Halifax was the best place to land an invasion force on the Atlantic coast, saying it was a major port while the forts meant to protect it could be taken out; the same report also stated that Quebec City should also be taken while Port Angeles in Washington state was the best place to land an invasion force on the Pacific coast to seize both Vancouver and Seattle. Though the Canadian government was not aware of these plans, Ottawa would have been greatly alarmed had Canadians officials known of this aspect of a war plan against the United States.

In 1908 the German Kaiser Wilhelm II claimed that British foreign policy would soon flounder between the need to "protect" Canada while maintaining the alliance with Japan. In an attempt to cause dissension in Anglo-Canadian relations, Wilhelm offered up the High Seas Fleet to protect Canada from the "Yellow Peril".

In 1908–1909, fears arose that Britain was falling behind in the naval race, leading to a major outburst of pro-British and anti-German feelings in Canada. Calls arose to assist the "mother country". The Conservative opposition led by Robert Borden demanded that Canada contribute money to the Royal Navy, a demand rejected by the Liberal prime minister, Sir Wilfrid Laurier. Though Laurier would rather not spend any money on navies, his promise to create a Canadian naval force during the debates on 29 March 1909 had trapped him, and in August 1909 the British pressed the Canadians to create their own navy, leading the government to pass the necessary legislation. On 4 May 1910, the Royal Canadian Navy came into existence. However, it consisted of only two cruisers with one for the Atlantic coast and one for the Pacific coast. The Imperial German Navy reported to the Kaiser that this was not a danger at all to the mighty High Seas Fleet.

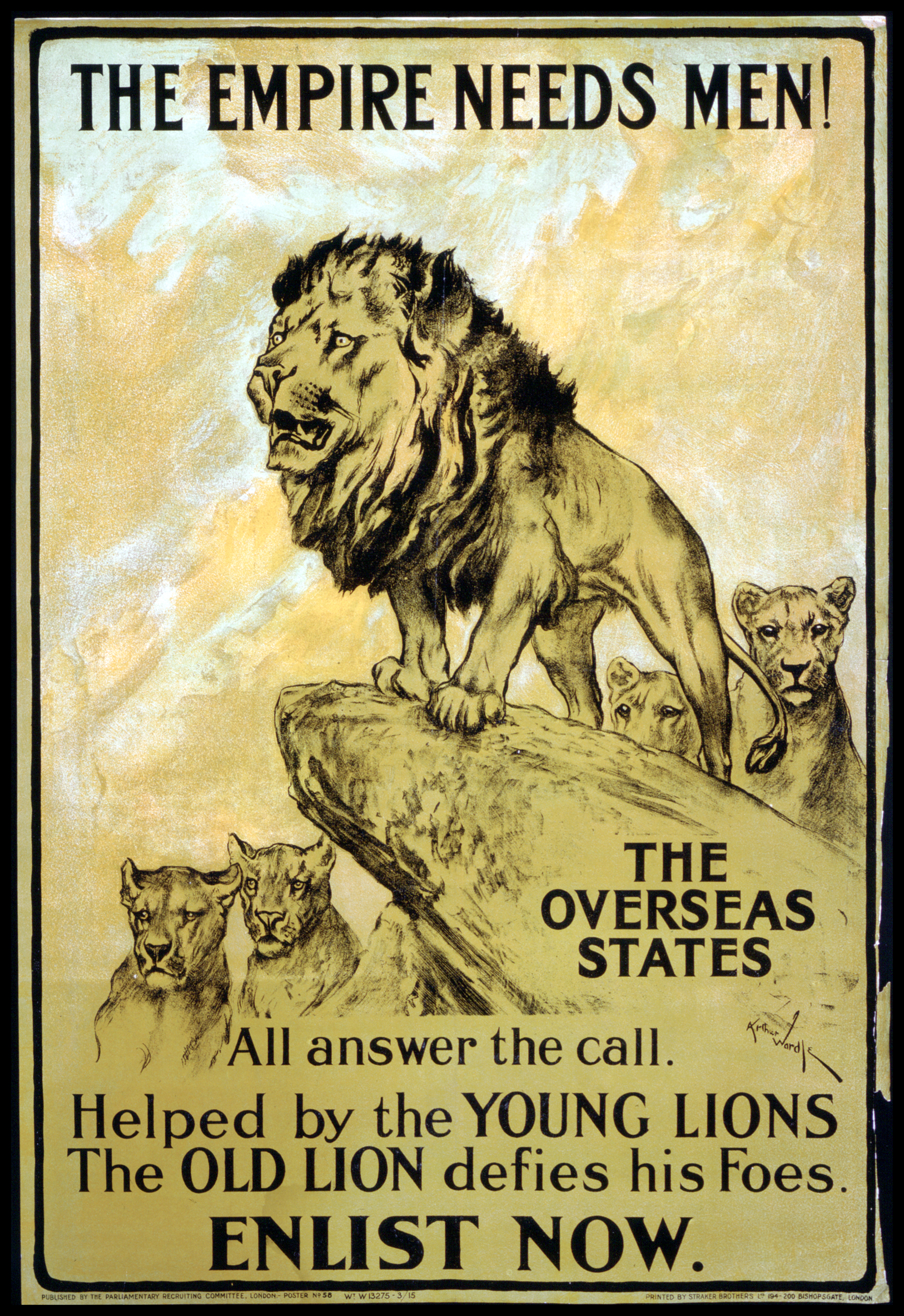
"The empire needs men!" war poster calling for volunteers.

==== Canada joins Britain in World War I ====
On 1 August 1914, Germany invaded Belgium, and Britain declared war to protect its ally France. Canada as a member of the British Empire was automatically at war. Many German men in Canada were reservists in the German military who escaped to the neutral United States, where they booked a passage to return to the Fatherland. The German ambassador in neutral U.S. Johann Heinrich von Bernstorff made several failed efforts to sabotage the Canadian war effort. Many rumours circulated and plots were hatched but no major successful sabotage took place. "Enemy alien" was the status of 393,000 Germans living in Canada; only 2009 were interred.

==== 1919 Paris Peace Conference ====
At the Paris peace conference between January–June 1919, the Canadian delegation was headed by the Prime Minister, Sir Robert Borden, marking the first time the Canadian head of government headed a delegation at a major international conference. Initially, it was agreed that reparations by Germany would be paid to the nations that endured damage from the war, which would ensure that France would have received the majority of the reparations as much of northern France had been turned into a wasteland by the war. The British Prime Minister, David Lloyd George, motivated by jealousy over the fact that Britain would have received a relatively small account of the reparations compared to France, put forward the demand that Germany pay the pensions of all the servicemen, widows, and orphans for the entire British empire, a demand that wrecked any possibility of an agreement at the peace conference for reparations. The final text of the Treaty of Versailles merely stated that Germany agreed to pay reparations to the Entente with the precise sum to be determined at another international conference as the Allied delegations proved unable to agree on the sums at the Paris peace conference. At the Paris peace conference, Canada supported the British demand for German reparations to cover all of the war-related pensions for the British empire. When the promised international conference to decide the amount reparations was finally held in London in 1921, the demand for German reparations to cover the pensions for the British empire was quietly dropped as unpractical.

==== Appeasement of Germany in 1930s ====
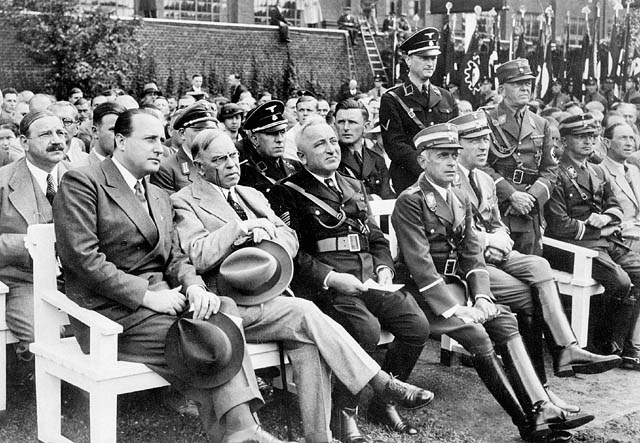
Canadian Prime Minister William Lyon Mackenzie King (second from left) at the opening ceremonies of the All-German Sports Competition, June 1937

Under the leadership of William Lyon Mackenzie King, the prime minister from 1921 to 1926, 1926–1930, and from 1935 to 1948, Canada consistently supported appeasement, arguing that the Treaty of Versailles was too harsh on Germany and needed to be revised. The Canadian historian Robert Teigrob described Mackenzie King as one of the most ardent appeasers in the entire Commonwealth, who saw appeasement as the best policy on both moral and practical grounds. Canadian historian C. P. Stacey argues that King was a spiritualist who felt he had a mission from God to restore peace to the world. In June 1937, Mackenzie King paid the first visit by a Canadian prime minister to Germany. Mackenzie King had grown up in Berlin, Ontario (modern Kitchener), at the time a mostly German-speaking city, and he was fluent in German. Mackenzie King met Adolf Hitler on 19 June 1937 in Berlin, and in an account of his meeting that he sent to the British Prime Minister Neville Chamberlain Mackenzie King wrote that "the impression gained by this interview was a very favorable one". Mackenzie King praised Hitler as a warm, caring man who was deeply concerned about the problems of ordinary people and stated he was impressed "by the very positive manner in which Hitler spoke of the determination of himself and his colleagues not to permit any resort to war". Mackenzie King called Hitler a "man of deep sincerity and a genuine patriot" who sometimes had to use ruthless methods because of the "big problems" he was faced with.

In July 1939, Mackenzie King wrote to Hitler appealing him not to let the Danzig crisis start another world war, writing at length about how much he admired Hitler, regarded him as one of his best friends, and spoke of his wish to work with der Führer to save the peace. Mackenzie King concluded: "You will, I know, accept this letter in the spirit in which it was written-an expression of the faith I have in the purpose you have at heart, and of the friendship with yourself which you have been so kind to share with me". Hitler in his reply stated he remembered meeting Mackenzie King "with pleasure", and then proceeded to ignore the Danzig crisis by saying he wanted 12 Canadian university students and Army officers to visit Germany. Hitler wrote that purpose of the visit would be to "convey to the Canadian people an impressive picture of Greater Germany's newly won strength and its will to peaceable constructive work".

Mackenzie King was strongly moved by Hitler's letter and accepted the offer to have 12 Canadians visit Germany, which he somehow believed would lead to a peaceful resolution of the Danzig crisis. Mackenzie King told the German ambassador in Ottawa that he regarded Hitler's letter "as an evidence of the confidence which I felt had been established between Hitler and myself at the time of our meeting, and the sincere desire mutually shared that every endeavor should be met towards mutual understanding". Mackenzie King spent the rest of the summer of 1939 working on arranging for the visit, but the German invasion of Poland on 1 September 1939 put an end to the scheme. The German-born American historian Abraham Ascher wrote that anyone reading of Mackenzie King's relationship with Hitler together with that of Lord Lothian (a prominent pro-appeasement Scottish aristocrat) "cannot avoid being taken aback by the superficiality and gullibility of these two authors" as both Lord Lothian and Mackenzie King convinced themselves that Hitler was an idealistic man of peace. Under Mackenzie King's leadership, Canada had one of the most restrictive policies against accepting refugees from Germany. Between 1933 and 1939, Canada accepted only 2,000 refugees from Germany.

==== World War II ====
A week after the King of Great Britain declared war on Germany, Canada followed suit with a vote in Parliament. There was no debate—the vote was unanimous but for one pacifist. The delay was to validate Canada's independent decision in terms of its new freedom in foreign policy. Despite repeated requests from Ottawa, London and Washington refused to share major decision-making with Ottawa.

Canada's combat roles centred in the North Atlantic and later in Italy and Northwestern Europe, In all, some 1.1 million Canadians served in the Canadian Army, Royal Canadian Navy, Royal Canadian Air Force, and in other forces, with 42,000 killed and another 55,000 wounded. Financial cost, including loans and gifts to Britain, was $22 billion. Unlike the First World War, the homefront was not bitterly divided.

Canadian forces played a major role in the invasion of the continent, with special responsibility in 1944-45 for the liberation of the Netherlands. Canadian forces initially took part in the occupation of Germany as part of the British occupation force, but in May 1946 Mackenzie King pulled out all of the Canadian forces in Europe.

==== Postwar ====
Canada played very little role in the postwar occupation of Germany. When asked by Britain to provide transport planes and air crews for the Berlin Blockade of 1948, Canada refused. However, under the enthusiastic leadership of Liberal Prime Minister Louis St. Laurent it did join NATO in 1949, despite opposition from some intellectuals, the far left, and many French Canadians.

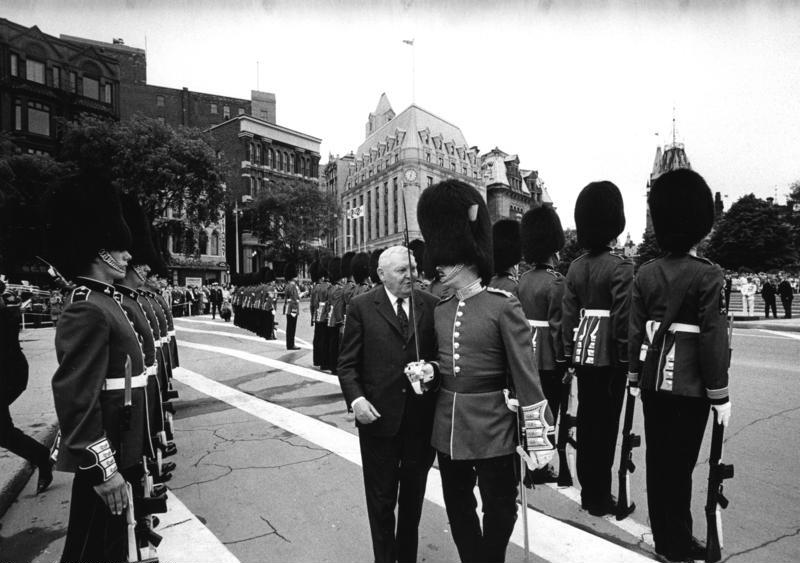
A guard of honour provided by the 1st Battalion, The Canadian Guards during the visit of West German Chancellor Ludwig Erhard to Ottawa in 1964.

The outbreak of the Korean War led to a major war scare on both sides of the Atlantic in 1950–51. At the time, there was a widespread belief that the North Korean invasion of South Korea was a feint intended to have the American forces bogged down in Korea to prepare the way for a Soviet invasion of West Germany. When China entered the Korean war, pushing back the United Nations forces (the largest of which was the American contingent), there were grave fears that the world was on the brink of World War III. On 16 January 1951, the NATO Supreme Allied Commander, General Dwight D. Eisenhower, visited Ottawa to ask Canada for help. Significantly, in his talks with General Guy Simonds, Eisenhower was more concerned about Germany than Korea, saying he wanted more Canadian forces to go to the former rather than the latter. Eisenhower's visit ended with St. Laurent promising to send two Canadian divisions to West Germany. Simonds wrote at the time that, since the shipping was not available to move two divisions to Europe, the Canadians best be there before World War III started. Ultimately, for reasons of cost and the unwillingness to impose conscription led Canada cut back its forces in West Germany to a brigade instead of the promised two divisions. Instead, it was promised that two divisions would be sent to West Germany in the event of World War Three despite Simonds's statement that Canada did not the necessary shipping to send two divisions to West Germany. The St. Laurent government supported West German rearmament, a hugely controversial subject in the 1950s, as the best way to shift the burden of defending West Germany onto the Germans.

The decision to send a brigade to West Germany was intended at least in part to reassure domestic fears in Canada about West German rearmament and to allow Canada a greater say in NATO. After the war scare caused by the Korean War passed, Canadian officials increasingly came to the conclusion that it was unlikely that the Soviet Union would ever invade West Germany, and the purpose of the brigade came to be more political than military. It was privately admitted that a single brigade was too small to make any serious difference in the event of the Red Army actually invading West Germany, but the mere existence of the brigade allowed Canada a greater weight in dealings with both the United States and the western European states than it otherwise would have possessed.

==== Canada vs European Community ====
The founding of the European Economic Community (EEC) in 1957 led to new tensions. The founding members of the EEC were France, West Germany, Italy, Belgium, the Netherlands and Luxembourg. The EEC followed a protectionist policy and a recurring Canadian complaint was that the EEC's tariffs made Canadian goods uncompetitive in the EEC markets. Given that Canada had sent a brigade to defend West Germany, many Canadian officials echoed the American complaints that the EEC should lower tariffs on goods from North America. In 1958, the Canadian ambassador in Bonn, Charles Ritchie submitted a note of protest to the West German Chancellor Konrad Adenauer against the EEC's protectionist policy, which he stated was causing much ill-will in Canada and asked Adenauer to use his influence with the EEC to lower the tariffs. During a visit to Bonn in 1959, the Canadian Defense Minister George Pearkes threatened to pull the Canadian brigade out of West Germany unless the EEC lowered its tariffs on Canadian goods. On 3 April 1969, the Canadian Prime Minister Pierre Trudeau cut Canada's NATO forces in Europe by 50%.

==== Good terms between Canada and Germany ====
In the 1970s, Canadian-West German relations were unusually friendly and close due to the friendship between the Prime Minister Pierre Trudeau and the Chancellor Helmut Schmidt. John G. H. Halstead, the Canadian ambassador in Bonn stated that the "no tanks, no trade" dispute said to have occurred at a 1975 Trudeau-Schmidt summit was a "myth". However, the summit did end with Schmidt promising to lobby the EEC to lower tariffs on Canadian goods in exchange for a promise from Trudeau to spend more on NATO. Schmidt told Trudeau that he wanted closer relations with Canada, saying he envisioned West Germany as having two North American partners instead of one. A major aspect of Trudeau's foreign policy in the 1970s was to seek a "rebalancing" of the Canadian economy by seeking to trade more with the EEC and Japan as a way to reduce American economic leverage over Canada. Schmidt's declaration of support for the "rebalancing" was greatly welcomed in Ottawa. Trudeau further had the Canadian Army buy 128 West German-built Leopard tanks in order to booster the West German arms industry, over the opposition of the Finance department which felt buying the tanks was wasteful. On 17 September 1991, the Canadian Defense Minister Marcel Masse announced that Canada would be pulling out its brigade in Germany by 1995 unless the Germans wanted the brigade to remain. Ultimately, the brigade left two years earlier than planned with all the Canadian forces leaving Germany on 30 July 1993.

==== East Germany ====
Canada established diplomatic relations with the German Democratic Republic on 1 August 1975. The GDR's legation to Canada was resident at the East German embassy in Washington, D.C. until 1987, when GDR opened an embassy in Ottawa. Canada's diplomatic mission to the GDR was accredited to the Canadian Embassy in Warsaw. Canada had been considering locations in East Berlin to open an embassy in October 1989, only weeks before the fall of the Berlin Wall. Relations between Canada and the GDR ended after the reunification of Germany, and the GDR's embassy in Ottawa was closed.

== Missions ==
In addition to its embassy in Ottawa, Germany maintains consulates in Toronto, Montreal and Vancouver. Additional diplomats responsible for specialized files are also accredited from Washington.

== Trade ==
In 2006, Germany was the-sixth ranked destination of Canadian exports (0.9%) and sixth-ranked source of imports to Canada (2.81%).

== Migration ==
10% of Canadians claim some German heritage.

== See also ==
- Foreign relations of Canada
- Foreign relations of Germany
- Comprehensive Economic and Trade Agreement
