= Peter Boehm =

Canadian diplomat

The Honourable Peter M. Boehm
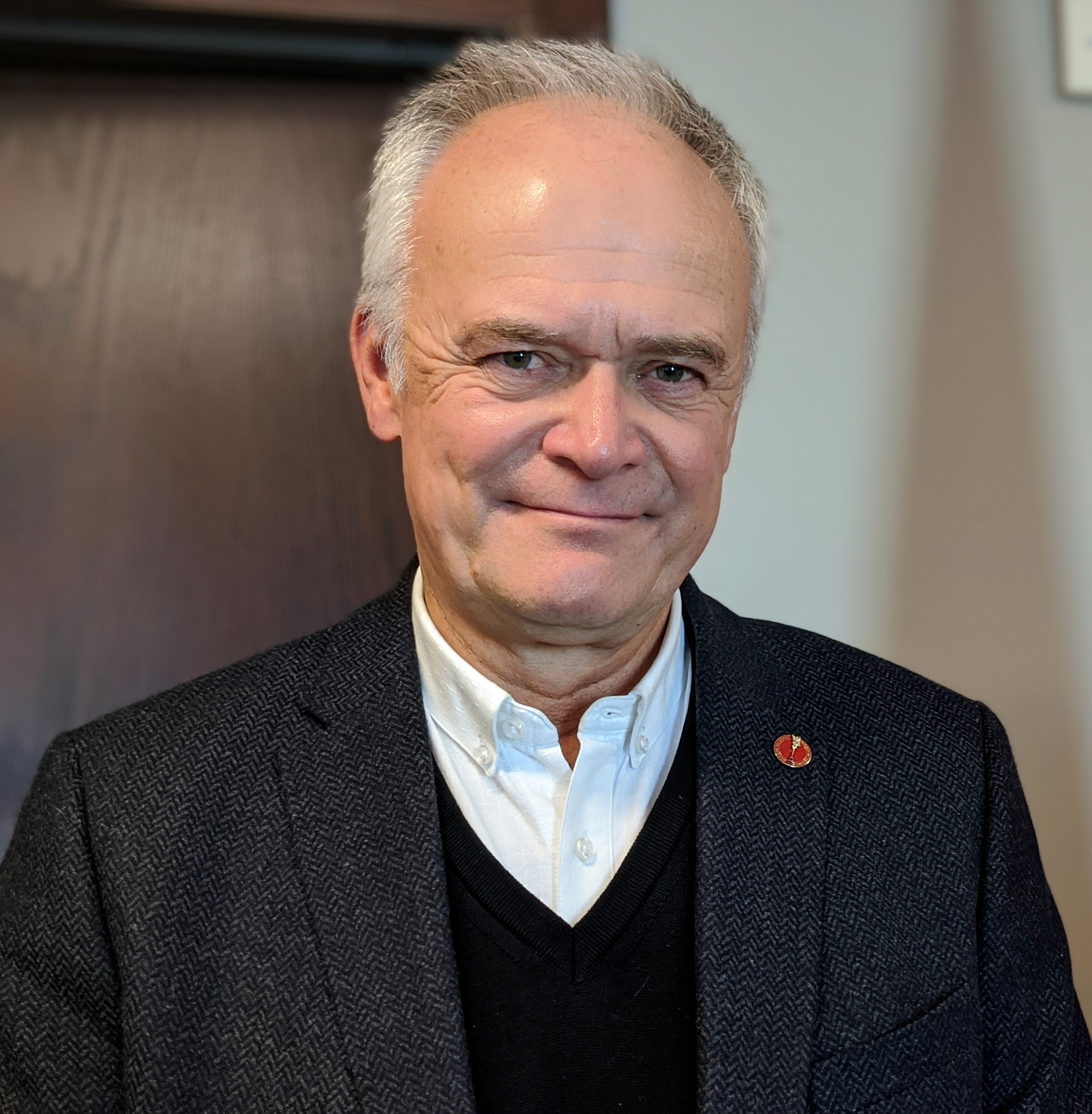
- Boehm in 2020

Canadian Senator from Ontario
- Incumbent
- Assumed office October 3, 2018
- Nominated by: Justin Trudeau
- Appointed by: Julie Payette
- Prime Minister: Justin Trudeau

Deputy Minister for the G7 Summit and Personal Representative of the Prime Minister (Sherpa)
- In office June 2017 – September 2018
- Prime Minister: Justin Trudeau

Deputy Minister of International Development
- In office 2016–2017
- Prime Minister: Justin Trudeau

Ambassador of Canada to Germany
- In office 2008–2012
- Prime Minister: Stephen Harper
- Preceded by: Paul Dubois
- Succeeded by: Marie Gervais-Vidricaire

Ambassador and Permanent Representative to the Organization of American States
- In office 1997–2001
- Prime Minister: Jean Chrétien
- Preceded by: Brian Dickson
- Succeeded by: Paul D. Durand

Personal details
- Born: Peter Michael Boehm; April 26, 1954 (age 72) Kitchener, Ontario, Canada
- Party: Independent Senators Group
- Education: University of Edinburgh; Carleton University; Wilfrid Laurier University
- Profession: Politician; diplomat

Peter Michael Boehm (born April 26, 1954) is a Canadian politician, former diplomat and deputy minister. He was appointed to the Senate of Canada in October 2018. Boehm was ambassador of Canada to Germany from 2008 to 2012. He was associate deputy minister and then senior associate deputy minister at Foreign Affairs and International Trade Canada from 2012 to 2016. He became deputy minister of international development in March 2016, and on July 31, 2017, was appointed deputy minister for the 2018 G7 Summit. He also continued as the Canadian "Sherpa" or personal representative of the prime minister for the G7 summits, as well as the Nuclear Security Summit.

On October 3, 2018, Boehm was nominated by Prime Minister Justin Trudeau to the Senate after he was recommended by the Independent Advisory Board for Senate Appointments.

== Education ==
Boehm holds a PhD in history from the University of Edinburgh with the thesis 'Towards principled influence : an overview of Canadian foreign policy, 1943-1948', a master's degree in international relations from Carleton University and an honours bachelor's degree in English and history from Wilfrid Laurier University.

== Career ==
A career diplomat, Boehm has served as assistant deputy minister for the Americas, North America, and consular affairs at the Department of Foreign Affairs and International Trade, where he was also the department's first chief political/economic officer. From 1997 to 2001 he was ambassador and permanent representative to the Organization of American States (OAS). From 2001 to 2004 he was minister (political and public affairs) at the Canadian Embassy in Washington.

He has held a variety of positions at the department and has also been assigned to the Canadian Embassies in Havana and San José. In 1993 he received the Canadian Foreign Service Officer Award for his contribution to the establishment of peace in Central America. In the Americas, he served as national summit coordinator for the Santiago and Québec City Summits, special envoy for the OAS Democratization Mission in Peru and personal representative (sherpa) of the prime minister for the Mar del Plata Summit in 2005.

From 2005 to 2008 he was the senior official responsible for the North American Leaders' Summits. He is a recipient of the Outstanding Achievement Award, the most prestigious award in the Public Service of Canada. From 2008 to 2012 he was Canadian ambassador in Berlin. In November 2012 he was appointed associate deputy minister (and later, senior associate deputy minister) of Foreign Affairs.

He was the deputy minister of international development from March 2016, and in June 2017 he was appointed as the deputy minister for the G7 Summit.

Boehm retired from the public service in September 2018 and was appointed to the Senate in early October. He represents Ontario in the upper chamber.

He was chair of the Canadian Senate Standing Committee on Foreign Affairs and International Trade in the 45th Canadian Parliament.
