= Svitlana Matviyenko =

Ukrainian media theorist and researcher

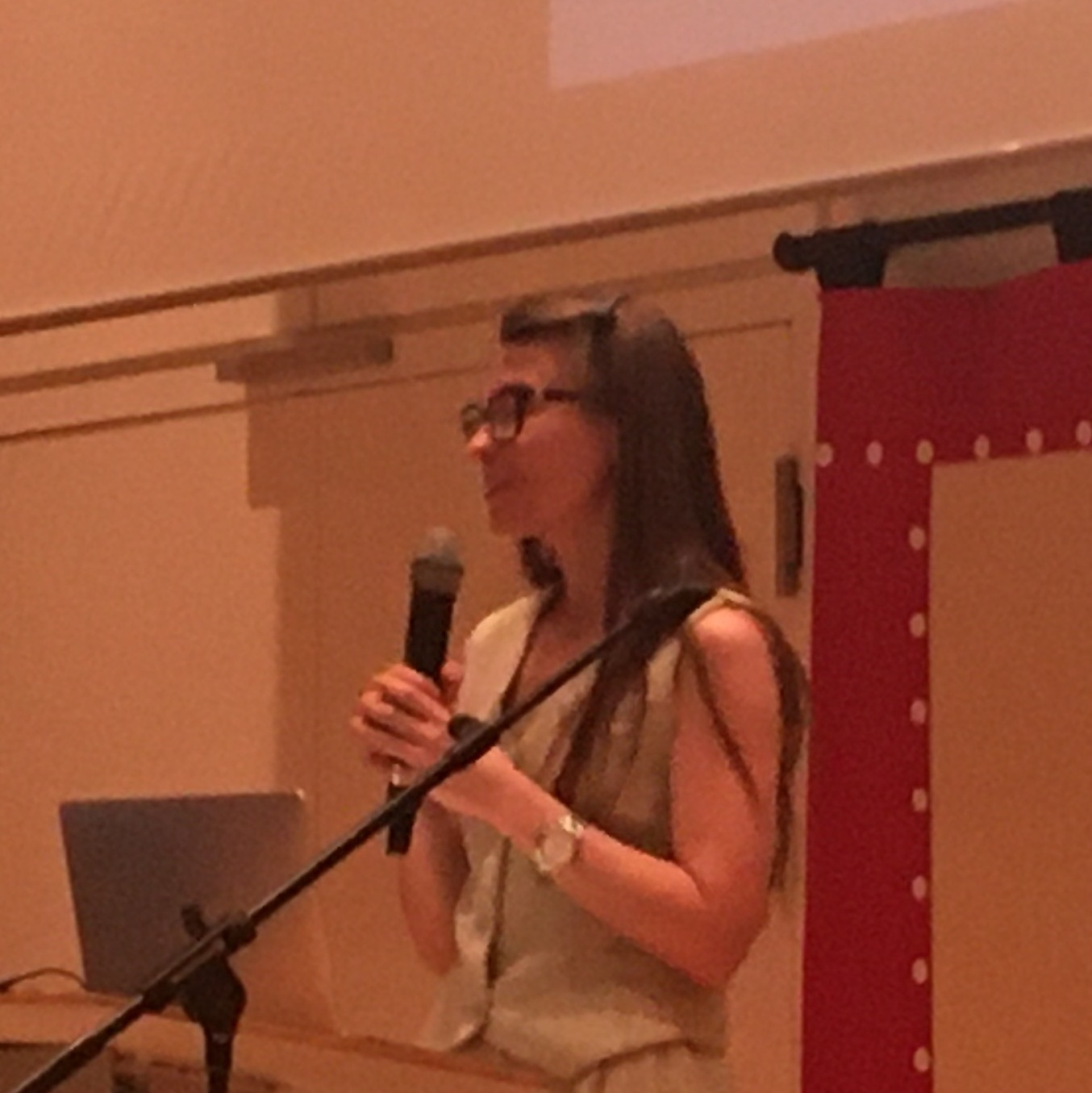
Matviyenko delivering a Marshall McLuhan lecture at the Canadian Embassy in Berlin, as a part of transmediale and CTM festivals in 2023

Svitlana Matviyenko (March 11, 1976) is a Ukrainian writer, literary critic, cultural researcher, film and media theorist. She researches the political economy of the media, the Internet, information theory, the history of cybernetics and psychoanalysis.

== Biography ==
Matviyenko was born in Kamianets-Podilskyi on March 11, 1976.

She first studied at the Kamianets-Podilskyi Pedagogical Institute and later at the Kyiv-Mohyla Academy. In the summer of 1998, she studied at Harvard. Her completion of her master's degree (2001) at an accelerated pace allowed her earlier admission to the postgraduate course of the Kyiv-Mohyla Academy.

She was the editor of the literature department in the magazine "Art Line", and the editor-in-chief of the newspapers "Literatura plus" and "Komentary".

Studied the master's course "Violence and recognition in culture" at Lviv University. As a Fulbright Graduate Student Program scholar, she worked at the University of Missouri in Columbia, Missouri, United States (Ph.D. Program). She presently resides in Canada.

She has authored numerous literary, critical and cultural articles, poems, as well as the book "Formalism Discourse: Ukrainian Context" (Lviv, 2004).

She currently is an Associate Professor for the department of Communications at Simon Fraser University. Where her classes are based around critical media analysis and disinformation. While also furthering her research on different elements of the conflicts between Russia and Ukraine. She is currently focusing on nuclear colonialism and the "weaponization of pollution and nuclear practices"

== Bibliography ==
- О. G. Astafiev (2018). Matviyenko Svitlana. Encyclopedia of Modern Ukraine / ed. by I. M. Dziuba [and others]; NAS of Ukraine, National Academy of Sciences of Ukraine – Kyiv: Institute of Encyclopedic Studies of the National Academy of Sciences of Ukraine, 2001-2022 – ISBN 966-02-2074-X Cited February 13, 2023.
- Svitlana Matviyenko. "Science should be socially significant" – My Mohylianka interview, October 15, 2018.
- "The Internet is finally ideal for cyber warfare" – media researcher Svitlana Matvienko.
- Political technologists militarize the population in the same way as advertising sells goods – media researcher.
