= Paul Dubois (diplomat) =

Canadian diplomat

Ambassador of Canada to Germany
- In office October 12, 2004 – July 2008
- Prime Minister: Paul Martin
- Preceded by: Peter Boehm
- Succeeded by: Marie Bernard-Meunier

Paul Dubois (born 1943 in Saint-Jean-sur-Richelieu, Quebec) is a Canadian diplomat who served as the Ambassador of Canada to Germany from 2002 to 2008.

== Life and career ==
Dubois earned a BA in 1969 at the Seminary of St. Hyacinthe, and then a Bachelor of Civil Law (BCL) from McGill University in 1973, after which he joined the Foreign Service. Dubois was accredited to the Embassy in Bangkok, Bonn and Abidjan. From 1990 to 1994, he was deputy representative of the Canadian government at the United Nations in Geneva. From 1992 to 1994 he was Deputy Permanent Representative of Canada to a disarmament conference. From 1997 to 2001 he was Canadian ambassador to the Republic of Austria and the Canadian government representative at the Organization for Security and Cooperation in Europe and other international organizations in the Vienna. During his time as ambassador to Austria, on behalf of the Government of Canada he signed the Additional Protocol to Canada's Comprehensive Safeguards Agreement under the Treaty on the Non-Proliferation of Nuclear Weapons with the International Atomic Energy Agency's Mohamed ElBaradei. From 2004 to 2008, he was the Ambassador to Germany.

In the Foreign Ministry in Ottawa, he was employed in the legal department, which he directed from 1986 until 1990. From 1994 to 2001 he headed the Department of Western Europe. From March to July 2001 he headed the Department for Europe, Middle East and North Africa. From July 2001 to August 2004 he was Assistant Secretary of State in the Foreign Ministry.

Predecessor	Office	Successor
Peter F. Walker	Canadian ambassador in Austria; 10 July 1997 to 13 March 2001	Ingrid Marianne Hall
Mary Mosser	Canadian ambassador to the Organization for Security and Cooperation in Europe 10 in Vienna; July 1997 to 16 July 2001	Evelyn Puxley
Marie Bernard-Meunier	Canadian ambassador in Germany; 12 October 2004 to July 2008	Peter Boehm
