= Arthur Julian Andrew =

Canadian diplomat

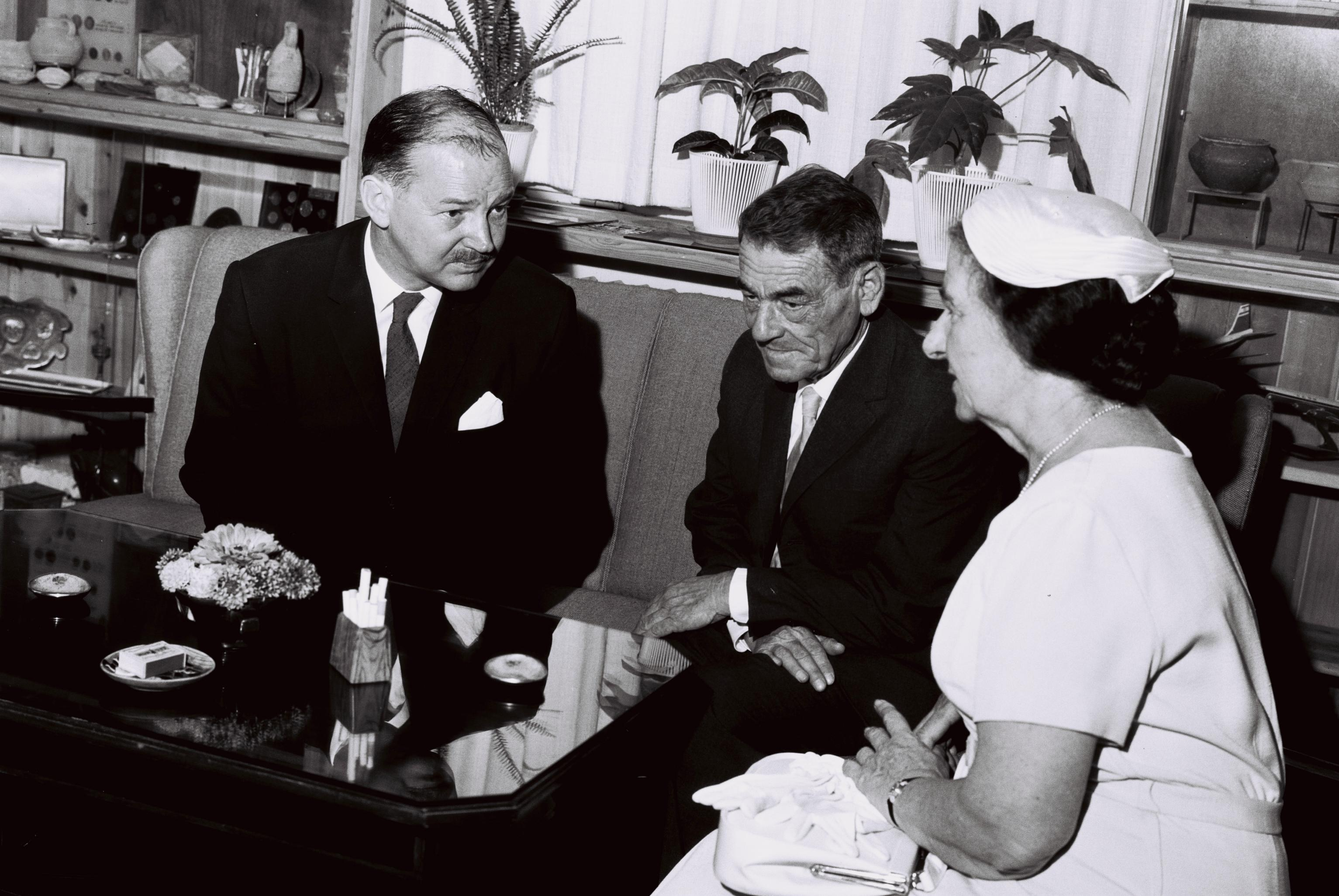
- Arthur Andrew, Canadian ambassador to Israel, with Kadish Luz and Golda Meir, after presenting his credentials, August, 1962
- Born: 1915; Pictou County, Nova Scotia
- Died: 1994 (aged 78–79)
- Occupation: diplomat

Arthur Julian Andrew (1915, in Pictou County, Nova Scotia – 1994) was a Canadian diplomat. He was the Chargé d'Affaires a.i. to Austria and Czechoslovakia and the High Commissioner to Cyprus and the Ambassador Extraordinary and Plenipotentiary to Israel, Sweden and Greece. He was also an author of books about international relations. Joyce Mowbray Sircom married Arthur Andrew in 1940. The couple had two daughters, Stephanie and Victoria. Joyce Andrew was one of the founding members of the External Affairs Wives Association (now the Foreign Service Community Association), a mutual aid group for families in the Foreign Service.

Diplomatic posts
| Preceded by Victor Doré | Chargé d'affaires a.i. to Austria; 1953-1954 | Succeeded by George Loranger Magann |
| Preceded by George Bernard Summers | Chargé d'affaires a.i. to Czechoslovakia; 1957-1960 | Succeeded by John Alexander McCordick |
| Preceded by Blanche Margaret Meagher | High Commissioner to Cyprus; 1962-1962 | Succeeded by Thomas Blake Burrill Wainman-Wood |
| Preceded by Jean-Marie Gaétan Déry | Ambassador Extraordinary and Plenipotentiary to Israel; 1962-1965 | Succeeded by William McKenzie Wood |
| Preceded by Oleg Alec Chistoff | Ambassador Extraordinary and Plenipotentiary to Sweden; 1965-1969 | Succeeded by Blanche Margaret Meagher |
| Preceded by Michel Gauvin | Ambassador Extraordinary and Plenipotentiary to Greece; 1975-1978 | Succeeded by James Rollins Barker |
