= Vera Alexander =

Canadian diplomat (born 1970)

Her Excellency Vera Alexander

Ambassador of Canada to Germany
- Incumbent
- Assumed office September 18, 2025
- Prime Minister: Mark Carney
- Preceded by: John Horgan (2024)

Personal details
- Born: September 18, 1970 (age 55)
- Education: University of Toronto (BA)

Vera Alexander (born September 18, 1970) is a Canadian diplomat and public servant, who has held senior positions in international affairs and public administration. In September 2025, Prime Minister Mark Carney announced her appointment as Canada's ambassador to Germany.

== Education ==
Alexander holds a bachelor of arts degree in international relations from the University of Toronto.

== Career ==
Alexander began her career at the Department of External Affairs in 1995. She has represented Canada in multiple international postings, including London, Washington, D.C., and Moscow. From 2017 to 2021, she served as Canada's Deputy Permanent Representative to the North Atlantic Treaty Organization (NATO), contributing to Canada's security and defence initiatives within the Alliance.

In Ottawa, Alexander has held several senior roles at Global Affairs Canada, including chief of staff to the deputy minister of Foreign Affairs, director Media Relations, and director of the Democracy Division. From 2006 to 2008, she served in the Privy Council Office as a senior policy advisor on Canada's mission in Afghanistan.

Since 2023, Alexander has served as associate assistant deputy minister of People and Talent Management at Global Affairs Canada, focusing on modernizing human resources services for the Canadian foreign service.

=== Ambassador to Germany ===
On September 18, 2025, Prime Minister Mark Carney announced Alexander's appointment as Canada's ambassador to Germany, effective in the coming weeks, replacing the late John Horgan. She presented her credentials to German President Frank-Walter Steinmeier on November 20, 2025.

== Accolades ==
In 2012, Alexander was awarded the Queen Elizabeth II Diamond Jubilee Medal in recognition of her contributions to public service.
