= Goldenville =

Community in Nova Scotia, Canada

Coordinates: 45°7′8.27″N 62°0′44.08″W

Goldenville in Nova Scotia

Goldenville is a small community located near to Sherbrooke, Nova Scotia in the Municipality of the District of St. Mary's. The community is mainly a forestry community but also has a gold mining museum.

== History ==
Nelson Nickerson found gold in the Goldenville area in August, 1861 and Zeba Hewitt built one of the first houses in the village that fall. By July, 1862, several houses had been erected in Goldenville and mining was begun. Two wharves were built the following spring and a road was constructed to the diggings. In 1867 the Templars erected a hall that was also used as a church. An Orange Order Lodge Hall was built in 1869 and the lower part was used as a schoolroom. A Masonic Lodge Hall was also built in 1869. A Roman Catholic chapel was built in Goldenville in 1871, but was moved to Sherbrooke in 1907. A Presbyterian church was opened in Goldenville on January 12, 1902.

Gold production in Goldenville from 1862 to 1941 is reported to have been 209,383.3 oz., the best producer in Nova Scotia. In 2018 the Government of Nova Scotia initiated the process of closing the former gold mining site that is heavily contaminated with arsenic and mercury.
