= Gordon Gale Crean =

Canadian diplomat (1914–1976)

Gordon Gale Crean (born 29 April 1914 in Toronto; died 10 May 1976 in London) was a Canadian Diplomat. He graduated from the University of Toronto in 1937 where he was a Member of Alpha Delta Phi. He served as the ambassador to Italy, to Yugoslavia and to West Germany from 1970 to 1975. His son is publisher and editor Patrick Crean.

Diplomatic posts
Preceded by Richard Plant Bower	Ambassador Extraordinary and Plenipotentiary to the Federal Republic of Germany; 1970–1975	Succeeded by John Gelder Horler Halstead
