= Richard Plant Bower =

Canadian diplomat

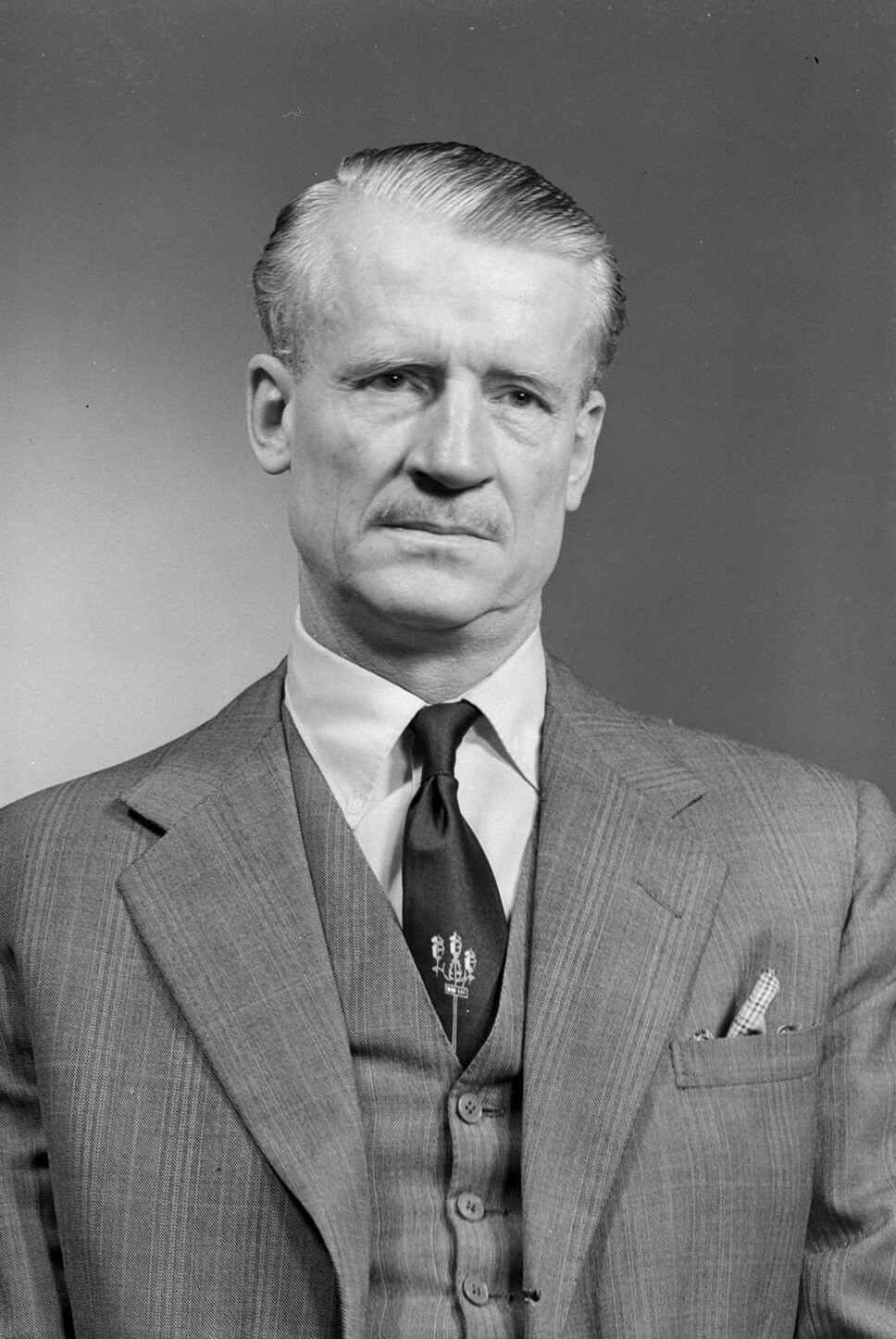
- Canadian diplomat

Ambassador Extraordinary and Plenipotentiary to Federal Republic of Germany
- In office 1966–1970
- Preceded by: Escott Meredith Reid
- Succeeded by: Gordon Gale Crean

Ambassador Extraordinary and Plenipotentiary to South Korea
- In office 1964–1966
- Preceded by: Established
- Succeeded by: Herbert Owen Moran

Ambassador Extraordinary and Plenipotentiary to Japan
- In office 1962–1966
- Preceded by: William Frederick Bull
- Succeeded by: Herbert Owen Moran

Ambassador Extraordinary and Plenipotentiary to Argentina
- In office 1958–1962
- Preceded by: Louis Phillippe Picard
- Succeeded by: Léon Mayrand

Ambassador Extraordinary and Plenipotentiary to Venezuela
- In office 1956–1958
- Preceded by: Harry Leslie Brown
- Succeeded by: Joseph Louis Eugène Couillard

Personal details
- Born: 1 March 1905 Kansas City, Missouri, United States
- Died: 1 January 1996 (aged 90)
- Education: University of Manitoba
- Occupation: Diplomat

Richard Plant Bower (March 1, 1905 – 1996) was a Canadian diplomat. He was appointed Ambassador Extraordinary and Plenipotentiary to Venezuela then to Argentina and concurrently to Paraguay and Uruguay. He was later appointed to Japan then in 1964 he was concurrently accredited as ambassador to South Korea, Canada's first ambassador to that country. Later he became ambassador to West Germany.

Bower was born on March 1, 1905, in Kansas City, Missouri, to Thomas Toefield Bower and Mabel Hamm. He graduated from the University of Manitoba in 1924. He joined the Canadian diplomatic corps in 1926 and was posted to the Netherlands as a trade commissioner. Subsequent postings included the then Dutch East Indies, New Zealand, Australia, Newfoundland (at that time an independent dominion within the British Commonwealth) and the United Kingdom. In 1956, on his appointment as ambassador to Venezuela, Bower transferred from the Department of Industry, Trade and Commerce to the Department of External Affairs. He died in 1996.

Diplomatic posts
Preceded by Escott Meredith Reid	Ambassador Extraordinary and Plenipotentiary to the Federal Republic of Germany; 1966-1970	Succeeded by Gordon Gale Crean
Preceded by Established	Ambassador Extraordinary and Plenipotentiary to Korea; 1964-1966	Succeeded by Herbert Owen Moran
Preceded by William Frederick Bull	Ambassador Extraordinary and Plenipotentiary to Japan; 1962-1966	Succeeded by Herbert Owen Moran
Preceded by Charles Blair Birkett	Ambassador Extraordinary and Plenipotentiary to Uruguay; 1961-1962	Succeeded by Joseph François Xavier Houde
Preceded by Established	Ambassador Extraordinary and Plenipotentiary to Paraguay; 1961-1962	Succeeded by Léon Mayrand
Preceded by Louis Phillippe Picard	Ambassador Extraordinary and Plenipotentiary to Argentina; 1958-1962	Succeeded by Léon Mayrand
Preceded by Harry Leslie Brown	Ambassador Extraordinary and Plenipotentiary to Venezuela; 1956-1958	Succeeded by Joseph Louis Eugène Couillard
