= Maurice Arthur Pope =

- Born: 29 August 1889; Rivière-du-Loup, Quebec, Canada
- Died: 20 September 1978 (aged 89); Ottawa, Ontario, Canada
- Relatives: Joseph Pope (father); Henri-Thomas Taschereau (grandfather); William Henry Pope (grandfather)
- Military career
- Service years: 1915–1950
- Rank: Lieutenant-General
- Unit: Royal Canadian Engineers
- Conflicts: World War I World War II ⋅
- Awards: Order of the Bath; Military Cross
- Other work: Diplomat and author

Lieutenant General Maurice Arthur Pope, CB MC (9 August 1889 – 20 September 1978) was a Canadian Army officer, civil engineer, and diplomat.

== Military career ==
Born in August 1889 in Rivière-du-Loup, Quebec, the son of Sir Joseph Pope, Prime Minister John A. Macdonald's principal secretary, and grandson of Sir Henri-Thomas Taschereau and William Henry Pope, he received a Bachelor of Science degree in engineering from McGill University in 1911. He worked for the Canadian Pacific Railway as a construction engineer until he joined the Royal Canadian Engineers as an officer in 1915. He served in the Canadian Expeditionary Force (CEF) in France during World War I.

After the war, he remained in the army and attended the British Army's Staff College, Camberley from 1924 to 1925. Among his fellow Canadian students there were Ernest William Sansom, Harry Crerar and Georges Vanier, both of whom were in the year above, attending from 1923 to 1924. He later attended the Imperial Defence College.

During World War II, he was brigadier general of the Canadian Military headquarters in London, vice-chief of the general staff in Ottawa, Chairman of the Canadian Joint Staff Mission in Washington, head of the Censorship Branch and military staff officer to Prime Minister Mackenzie King. From 1945 to 1950, he was Head of the Canadian Military Mission in Berlin. He retired with the rank of lieutenant-general.

From 1950 to 1953, he was the Canadian Ambassador to Belgium. From 1953 to 1956, he was the Canadian Ambassador to Spain. He retired in 1956 and lived in Ottawa.

His memoir was Soldiers and politicians: the memoirs of Lt.-Gen. Maurice A. Pope C.B., M.C (University of Toronto Press, 1962), which, in the words of historian J. L. Granatstein, is "notable for its good prose and evidence of wide learning". He also completed and edited his father's autobiography, Public servant: the memoirs of Sir Joseph Pope (Oxford University Press, 1960).

== Bibliography ==
- Granatstein, Jack (1993). The Generals: The Canadian Army's Senior Commanders in the Second World War. Stoddart Publishing. ISBN 978-0773727397.
