= John G. H. Halstead =

Canadian diplomat

John Gelder Horler Halstead
- Born: January 27, 1922; Vancouver, British Columbia, Canada
- Died: February 9, 1998 (aged 76); Ottawa, Ontario, Canada
- Occupations: Diplomat and academic
- Years active: 1943-1996
- Known for: Serving as the Canadian ambassador to West Germany

John Gelder Horler Halstead (27 January 1922 – 9 February 1998) was a Canadian diplomat and academic.

== Early career ==
Halstead was born in Vancouver into a middle-class family. In 1943, he graduated from the University of British Columbia, and joined the Royal Canadian Naval Reserve, serving as a lieutenant for the next three years until his honorable discharge in 1946. In 1943–45, Halstead was stationed in London, where he worked in naval intelligence. In 1946, he joined the Department of External Affairs while studying at the London School of Economics between 1948 and 1950, where he was awarded a BsC in 1950. From 1952 to 1955, he worked in the NATO department of the External Affairs. In 1953 he married Jean McAllister, having two children, Ian and Christopher. During his diplomatic career, he had postings at the United Nations in New York, Tokyo, Paris and London.

== A Diplomat in Paris ==
From 1961 to 1966, Halstead served as the counselor (number two official) at the Canadian embassy in Paris. In October 1963, Halstad reported from the embassy in Paris: ""Relations between Canada and France have traditionally been based on sentiment rather than interest." Halstad went on to argue that France's historical connection to Canada going back to the 16th century and the experience of the two world wars have provided "a fund of mutual goodwill and an easy assumption (perhaps too easy) that we should share the same interests". Halstead argued that what was missing was "the translation of the ties of history...into contemporary links of mutual knowledge and interest". He ended by arguing that was needed were closer Franco-Canadian ties as the Quiet Revolution in Quebec created a need to respond to "the growth of a dynamic modern society in the province of Quebec and the accompanying development of a more assertive French-Canadian personality". Besides for a way to manage the changes caused by the Quiet Revolution, Halstead argued that closer Franco-Canadian ties was a way to counterbalance the United States. Halstead argued that the success of the European Economic Community (EEC) as the European Union was then called, of which France was at the center of, provided an opportunity to build a connection to a new power bloc which would allow Canada greater independence from the United States.

However, the Premier of Quebec, Jean Lesage, was a federalist, but also a French-Canadian nationalist who started to develop ties with France on his own, a policy that was continued by his successor, Daniel Johnson Sr. The tendency of Quebec to carry out its own foreign policy was encouraged by the French president Charles de Gaulle, much to the displeasure of Ottawa, who saw this as French interference in Canadian domestic affairs. Halstead wanted closer ties with France, but would not countenance what he saw as French meddling in Canadian internal affairs. In November 1966, Jean Marchand, the federal minister of manpower and immigration, visited Paris, and de Gaulle refused to meet him under the grounds that he did not represent Quebec, a statement that enraged Marcel Cadieux, the undersecretary at External Affairs, who pointed out that de Gaulle had just met several visiting Quebec cabinet ministers. In December 1966, Halstead as the chief of the European Division of External Affairs had a stormy meeting with de Gaulle at the Elysée Palace, saying for the French president to "receive Quebec ministers because they were French-Canadians but fail receive French-Canadians because they were Federal ministers was the equivalent to saying that the Quebec government and not the Federal government represented French-Canadians. To foster such an impression would cause serious difficulties and would have the effect of interfering in our domestic affairs". In 1966, Halstead suggested the snowflake design for the new Order of Canada, advice which ended up being accepted.

== Adviser to the Prime Minister ==
In 1965, while serving at the Canadian embassy in Paris, he first met a rising Liberal MP named Pierre Trudeau whom he forged a friendship with, though he felt that Trudeau was an intelligent, but superficial intellectual. After Trudeau became Prime Minister in February 1968, Halstead became one of his leading advisers on foreign policy with a special focus on relations with Europe. Much of the Trudeau's Foreign Policy for Canadians white paper issued in April 1968 was based upon a document that Halstead had written in 1967. Halstead felt that Canadian foreign policy should be "rebalanced" with Canada seeking closer ties with the states of Western Europe to counterbalance the United States, a thesis that Trudeau accepted. However, Halstead also felt that Canada should remain active in the North Atlantic Treaty Organization (NATO) as the western European states placed a great emphasis on NATO, advice that Trudeau did not favor as the prime minister saw defense spending as wasteful. For a time in 1968–1969, Trudeau seriously considered pulling Canada out of NATO, and only elected to remain in NATO because pulling out would damage relations too much with the United States and the western European states. Halstead stated in a 1988 interview that Trudeau was intelligent and well travelled, but was "naïve" on foreign policy and "totally ignorant about diplomacy". From 1971 to 1975, Halstead served as Deputy Under-Secretary in the Department of External Affairs. As Under-Secretary, Halstead handled nation-to-nation relations and international security questions.

In the 1972 election, the Liberals under Trudeau won a minority government and to stay in power, the Liberals won a promise of support from the New Democratic Party under David Lewis. During the minority Trudeau government, Canadian foreign policy moved sharply to the left with the House of Commons voting on January 4, 1973, to pass a resolution condemning the American Christmas bombings against North Vietnam between 18 and 29 December 1972 as a war crime. One of the MPs who voted for the resolution was Trudeau. As a consequence, Canadian-American relations which were already strained because of the mutual loathing between President Richard Nixon and Trudeau, reached a post-war nadir. Though the resolution was only symbolic, the mere fact that it passed caused much annoyance in Washington, and Nixon refused to see the Canadian ambassador in Washington for months afterward. Only the fact that Nixon wanted Canada to remain on the International Control Commission, which supervised the implantation of the Geneva Accords of 1954, prevented him from taking a more punitive approach to Canada. Halstead who had a considerable influence at External Affairs, pressed very strongly for an economic "rebalancing", arguing that Canada should seek closer ties with the EEC, to reduce American economic leverage over Canada. In October 1973, Halstaed went with Trudeau for a visit to Brussels to meet François-Xavier Ortoli, the president of the European Commission (the body that controlled the EEC). Ortoli rebuffed Trudeau's request for a free trade agreement with the EEC, but indicated that the EEC would was willing to seek closer economic ties with Canada. A major problem with Halstead's economic "rebalancing" concept was that the Canadians were far more desirous of a free trade agreement with the EEC than vice versa.

In 1974, the United Nations General Assembly invited Yasser Arafat of the Palestine Liberation Organization (PLO) to speak about the Israeli-Palestinian dispute, which posed a quandary for Canada. On the same day Arafat was due to speak, the External Affairs minister Allan MacEachen was also due to speak before the General Assembly, and many expected him to say something about the Middle East as a result. Public opinion in Canada tended to be pro-Israel and to see the PLO as a terrorist group. As many Canadian Jews tended to vote Liberal, the government was loath to offend a generally pro-Liberal voting bloc. But in the aftermath of the Arab oil shock of October 1973-March 1974 which had thrown the economies of the West into a steep recession, few wanted to offend King Faisal of Saudi Arabia, who was the driving force behind the Arab oil embargo.

The Arab oil embargo, which lasted from 17 October 1973 – 17 March 1974 ended the "long summer" of prosperity for the West that began in 1945, causing the steepest economic contraction since the Great Depression. The end of the "long summer" of prosperity, which many people in the West had assumed would last forever, caused considerable angst at the time. A famous headline in the Financial Times in December 1973 declared "The Future Will Be Subject To Delay". As a consequence, the Palestinian-Israeli dispute had been raised to the forefront of international politics as King Faisal, who was hailed at a conference of Third World leaders in February 1974 as "the mightiest Arab since the Prophet Mohammad", made it clear that he wanted a resolution of the long-standing dispute in favor of the Palestinians. The oil shock caused a major realignment in international relations as leaders of Western nations such as Britain and France were forced to court the favor of Middle Eastern leaders such as King Faisal and Shah Mohammad Reza Pahlavi of Iran, and even the American secretary of state, Henry Kissinger, declared the United States would henceforward be "even-handed" with the Israeli-Palestinian dispute. At the same time, there was much anger in the West at the Arab nations-which had just thrown their economies into a steep recession, caused a spiraling inflation, and led to major line-ups at gas stations-and in many quarters Arab became a common term of abuse. From the viewpoint of the Trudeau government, making an excessively pro-Arab statement at the UN would be politically unwise.

In a memo of 2 October 1974 addressed to MacEachen, Halstead advocated that the Canadian delegation at the UN deliver a statement with "an implicit reference to a Palestinian personality". Halstead argued that such a statement would acknowledge the existence of a sense of Palestinian nationalism without however explicitly saying so; would align Canadian policies on the Israeli-Palestinian dispute with those of the western European states; and offer hope to moderate Palestinian nationalists that the world was not ignoring them. Halstead's memo influenced MacEachen to deliver a statement before the UN General Assembly speaking about Israel's "legitimate" security concerns while also admitting to "the concept of a distinct Palestinian entity and personality". MacEachen ended with the offer that Canada was willing to serve as an honest broker to work for peace in the Middle East. Though MacEachen's speech had no impact on international affairs with his offer of mediation being ignored by both sides, it satisfied the Trudeau's foreign and domestic objectives, being seen as sufficiently pro-Israeli to keep the favor of those supportive of Zionism while at the same time being sufficiently pro-Palestinian to avoid angering the Arab states.

== Ambassador in Bonn ==
He served as the Canadian ambassador to West Germany from 1975 to 1980 and as the Canadian representative to the North Atlantic Treaty Organization council in Brussels from 1980 to 1982. During his time in Bonn, the Germanophile Halstead sought to develop closer cultural links between the Federal Republic and Canada. Halstead help found the Gesellschaft für Kanada-Studien, set up the annual Grainau conference between Canadian and German academics, and encouraged German universities to establish Canadian studies programs.

Halstead described Michael Pitfield, the chief clerk of the privy council from 1975 to 1979 and from 1980 to 1982, as an "evil influence". Halstead stated that Pitfield was an intriguer with a lust for power who tried to limit the access of others to Trudeau in order to enhance his own influence and that he together with many others in the government greatly disliked him. Halstead accused Ptifield of having created a deliberately complicated bureaucratic set-up in order to create chaos and in-fighting within the government again as a way to enhance his power.

Trudeau was a very close personal friend of the West German chancellor Helmut Schmidt, and as a result Canadian-West German relations were unusually warm and friendly in the years 1974–1982. Halstead stated that the "no tanks, no trade" dispute that said to have occurred at a 1975 Trudeau-Schmidt summit with the latter threatening to use West German influence within the EEC to impose punitive tariffs on Canada unless Trudeau agreed to spend more on defense was a "myth". Halstead maintained that Schmidt as the leader of a frontline NATO state did prefer that Canada spend more on defense and contribute more to NATO, but the way the media presented this disagreement as a major crisis in Canadian-German relations was a gross exaggeration. Halstead later stated that the Trudeau-Schmidt friendship was a missed opportunity as Trudeau saw foreign policy as "only for dabbing" and was never willing to commit the time to develop institutional links that would outlast his friendship with Schmidt. Because no institutional links were ever developed, when Schmidt fell from power in 1982, West German-Canadian relations returned to normal.

On 1 October 1976, a Frame-work Economic Agreement of the sort that Halstead had long pushed for was signed with the EEC. However, immediately thereafter, Canada placed a uranium embargo to the EEC. The uranium embargo was a belated response to India's explosion of its first atomic bomb on 18 May 1974, which took place after India violated an agreement with Canada to provide nuclear technology and uranium only for peaceful purposes. The Indian nuclear test caused much criticism of the government in Canada for unwittingly providing both the technology and the uranium which made it possible for India to have nuclear weapons. As a result, Canada sought more stronger safeguards that in the future other governments would not use Canadian uranium for building nuclear weapons, and upon unable to obtain such guarantees from several European nations imposed a blanket embargo on shipping uranium to the entire EEC. The Canadian uranium embargo caused much ill-will in European capitals, and ruined the possibility of the frame-work economic agreement becoming a free trade pact. In the aftermath of the oil shock of 1973–74, nuclear energy became much favored all over the West as a way to secure "energy independence" from the turbulent Middle East, and most European nations had embarked on nuclear energy projects, which required importing uranium. The German historian Peter Slingelin wrote the major responsibility for the uranium embargo rested with the Europeans, who failed to understand the domestic furor in Canada caused by the Indian nuclear test, which made the Canadian government appear gullible and foolish. The uranium embargo served its purpose as promises were obtained from the EEC nations that Canadian uranium would not be used to develop nuclear weapons or alternatively sold to nations that were known to be seeking nuclear weapons such as Pakistan, Iran, Brazil, Argentina, North Korea and Taiwan. As the ambassador in Bonn, Halstead felt that Canada missed several opportunities for closer economic relations with the EEC by not developing an industrial policy in sync with those of the EEC nations.

== On the NATO Council ==
The years 1980-1981 saw the rise of the Solidarność trade union in Poland which challenged the Communist Party, and led to fears of a Soviet invasion of Poland. As the Canadian representative on the NATO council, Halstead was involved in discussions about drawing up a contingency plan to deter a Soviet invasion of Poland without triggering World War Three. Halstead stated the possibility of NATO forces intervening if the Soviet Union did indeed invade Poland "was always out of the question", but it was felt necessary to send a message to Moscow that the NATO states were "not unmindful" of Poland. Halstead stated that during his service on the NATO Council that the subject of Poland took up most of his time and that he was "left a great deal of discretion" by Ottawa as it was understood that the planning with regards to Poland was only tentative. Halstead recalled in 1996 that there were fears that if the Soviet Union did invade Poland, there would be massive exodus of Polish refugees across the Baltic Sea, which might led to a Soviet violations of the territorial waters of Denmark and West Germany, both of whom were NATO members. To prevent this, Halstead voted at the NATO council for a measure to raise the state of alert for NATO forces in West Germany by "one notch" and to increase the number of NATO naval forces in the Baltic by sending in a task force of destroyers and frigates, which served to remind the Soviets that NATO was a force in the Baltic.

Had the Soviet Union invaded Poland, Halstead stated it was agreed that there was no possibility of NATO intervention as would cause World War Three and a catastrophic "nuclear exchange", but was it was agreed that the NATO states should impose sanctions on the Soviet Union. He stated that another major area of disagreement within NATO was the insistence on the part of the United States that the western European states cancel a planned pipeline to ship oil and natural gas from the Soviet Union, pressure that the Europeans stoutly resisted. Halstead stated the American position was the pipeline would make western Europe economically dependent upon Soviet oil and gas while allowing the Soviet Union to gain valuable western "hard currencies". By contrast, the western European position was that the converse was also true, namely that constructing the pipeline would make the Soviet Union economically dependent on the western "hard currencies" for which the oil and gas would be paid for with, and that it always possible to import oil/gas from other parts of the world if the Soviets should threaten a cut-off. Halstead stated as that much of his time on the NATO council was attempting to mediate between the heated dispute, sympathizing with the Europeans who felt the Americans were bullying them while also reminding the Americans that letting the dispute about the pipelines get out of control would ultimately damage NATO, and hurt their own interests.

It was finally agreed that if the Soviets did invade Poland, sanctions would be imposed, but the pipelines would not be cancelled. In December 1981, the Polish crisis came to an abrupt climax with a military coup d'état bringing a new government in Warsaw that declared martial law and banned Solidarność. Halstead stated that he like anyone else on the NATO Council were taken by surprise by the denouement of the Polish crisis, but at least the NATO nations had a plan in place for imposing sanctions on the Soviet Union, which was immediately put into action after the coup in Warsaw.

Halstead was offended in 1982 when Trudeau gave a speech at a NATO summit criticizing NATO as "boring". In response, Halstead stated that if the prime minister was serious about reforming NATO, then he should have read some of the telegrams he been sending him over the last six months instead of giving an anti-NATO speech at the NATO summit without informing him in advance. Halstead resigned in protest over Trudeau's behavior. Halstead described Trudeau as clever, but superficial as he never read policy papers and preferred short briefings on complex subjects, hoping that he could just "wing" his way through international meetings with his intelligence and wit.

== Retirement ==
In 1982, Halstead retired from the diplomatic corps and taught a course on international relations at Georgetown University. Halstead subsequently served as a visiting professor at the University of Windsor and at Carleton University in Ottawa. In retirement, Halstead wrote frequently about NATO, collective security and Atlanticism. He was very active in promoting Canadian Studies programs in German universities. In Germany, there has been an ongoing obsession with the indigenous peoples of North America ever since the 19th century when the German novelist Karl May published a series of bestselling books about the adventures in the Wild West of a German immigrant cowboy Old Shatterhand and his Apache sidekick Winnetou. As a result, many Germans are fascinated with the First Nations peoples of Canada, leading to much enrollment in Canadian studies programs in German universities.

In his writings in retirement, Halstead urged multilateralism in foreign policy as the basis for all the Western states, especially the United States, writing in 1989: "The trouble is that unilateralism feeds on ignorance, and ignorance breeds bad policy. Less heed is paid to the views and interests of allies, and multilateral forms of consultation and cooperation may be bypassed. In the process, diplomatic methods may be subordinated to military measures, and political and economic leadership may be made hostage to the emphasis on military strength. Too easily a vicious circle can be created in which freedom of action is brought at the expense of international cooperation without which the policies undertaken cannot in fact, succeed".

In 1989, Halstead was awarded the Peace Prize of the Association of German Veterans and an honorary PhD from the University of Augsburg in 1994. In 1996, Halstead was awarded the Order of Canada. He died in Ottawa in 1998.

Diplomatic posts
Preceded by Gordon Gale Crean	Ambassador Extraordinary and Plenipotentiary to the Federal Republic of Germany; 1975-1980	Succeeded by Klaus Goldschlag

== Books and articles ==
- Barry, Donald; Hillike, John (1995). Canada's Department of External Affairs, Volume 2: Coming of Age, 1946-1968. Montreal: McGill University Press. ISBN 0773562346.
- Bothwell, Robert; Granatstein, Jack (2017). Trudeau's World: Insiders Reflect on Foreign Policy, Trade, and Defence, 1968-84. Vancouver: University of British Columbia Press. ISBN 978-0774836401.
- Halstead, John (1996). "Crisis Management in NATO: The Polish crisis, 1980-1981". In David Chalmer Reece (ed.). Special Trust and Confidence: Envoy Essays in Canadian Diplomacy. Montreal: McGill University Press. pp. 177–188. ISBN 077359602X.
- Hilliker, John; Halloran, Mary; Donaghy, Greg (2017). Canada's Department of External Affairs, Volume 3: Innovation and Adaptation, 1968–1984. Toronto: University of Toronto Press. ISBN 978-1487514969.
- Lacey, Robert (1981). The Kingdom. San Diego, California: Harcourt Brace Jovanovich. ISBN 0151472602.
- McCreery, Christopher (2005). The Order of Canada: Its Origins, History, and Developments. Toronto: University of Toronto Press. ISBN 1442658886.
- O'Connor, Brendon (2019). Anti-Americanism and American Exceptionalism: Prejudice and Pride about the USA. London: Routledge. ISBN 978-1000000900.
- Stingelin, Peter (1991). "Canada Facing an Open Market from the Atlantic to the Urals More Business Than Usual". In Jean-Michel Lacroix & Cornelius H. W. Remie (ed.). Canada on the Threshold of the 21st Century European Reflections Upon the Future of Canada. Selected Papers of the First All-European Studies Conference, The Hague, The Netherlands, October 24–27, 1990. Amsterdam: John Benjamins Publishing Company. pp. 551–559. ISBN 9789027274083.
