= Klaus Goldschlag =

Canadian diplomat (1922–2012)

Klaus Goldschlag OC
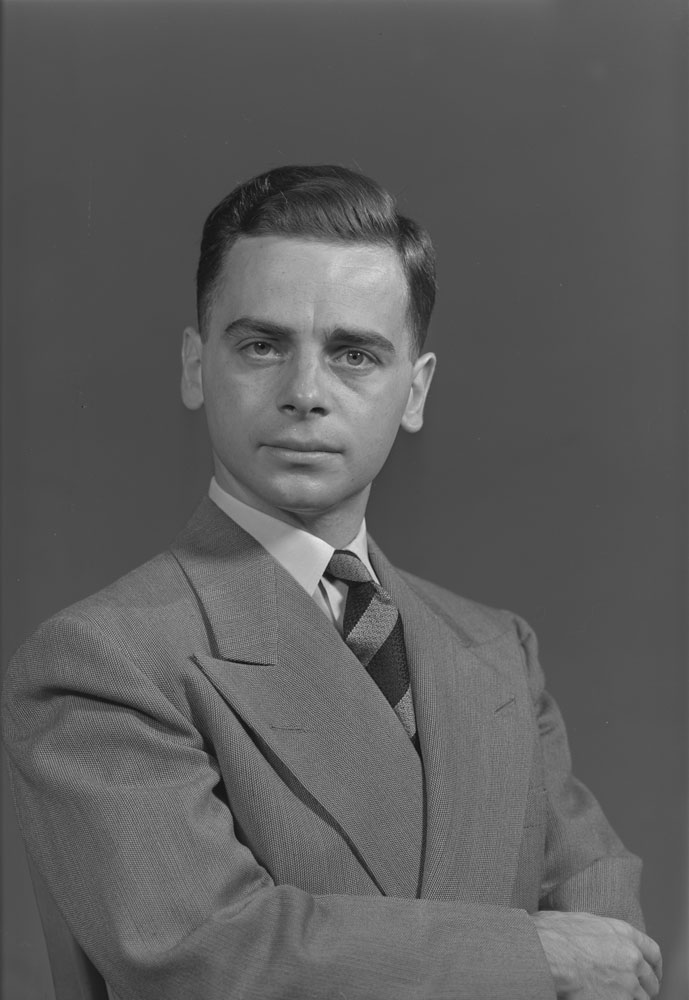
- Goldschlag, c. 1950

Ambassador of Canada to Germany
- In office 1980–1983
- Preceded by: John Gelder Horler Halstead
- Succeeded by: Donald Sutherland McPhail

Ambassador of Canada to Italy
- In office 1973–1976
- Succeeded by: Roger Anthony Bull

Ambassador of Canada to Turkey
- In office 1971–1967

Personal details
- Born: March 23, 1922 Berlin, Germany
- Died: January 30, 2012 (aged 89) Toronto, Ontario, Canada
- Education: University of Toronto

Klaus Goldschlag, OC (March 23, 1922 – January 30, 2012) was a Canadian diplomat.

== Early life ==
He was born in Berlin, Germany, to the lawyer Walter Goldschlag and his wife Charlotte, née Blumenthal. The family on his father's side were middle-class assimilated Jews and included lawyers and merchants.

His paternal uncle, Gerhard, was the father of the infamous Nazi collaborator Stella Goldschlag, and another uncle, George, was a writer.

Goldschlag attended orthodox school and was one of the top students in his class.

During the Nazi regime, Goldschlag became a Jewish semi-orphan living at the Baruch Auerbach home for Jewish children in Berlin Nazi Germany. His father had died in 1930 due to a chronic illness contracted during World War I and his mother not having sufficient money to raise him had to leave him at the orphanage in 1933 while she went into hiding. She was only able to visit him occasionally.

In 1934, Alan Coatsworth, a Toronto, Ontario, fire-insurance broker and a Methodist who wanted to finance the escape of a refugee from Nazi Germany and through communication with two rabbis, Maurice Eisendrath from Toronto and Leo Baeck in Germany, Coatsworth was made aware of Goldschlags situation, and in 1937 helped him leave Germany and adopted Goldschlag.

Goldschlag attended Vaughan Road Collegiate and it was the wish of Coatsworth that he became a rabbi. In 1939 his mother was able to leave Germany and emigrated to the Dominican Republic. She and her son were reunited in the 1940s.

== Career ==
After earning his master's degree in Arabic at the University of Toronto, Goldschlag joined the diplomatic and foreign affairs department.

== Public service ==
Goldschlag was ambassador to Turkey (1967–1971), Italy (1973–1976) and West Germany (1980–1983). Goldschlag also served as deputy under-secretary of state for external affairs. In 1981 he received the Outstanding Achievement Award for public service of Canada. In 1983, he was made an officer of the Order of Canada.

== Death ==
Goldschlag died of pancreatic cancer on January 30, 2012.
