= Hugh Llewellyn Keenleyside =

Canadian university professor, diplomat, and civil servant

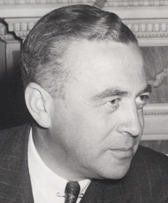
- Born: 7 July 1898; Toronto, Ontario, Canada
- Died: 27 September 1992 (aged 94)
- Education: University of British Columbia
- Occupations: university professor, diplomat, and civil servant

Hugh Llewellyn Keenleyside, CC (7 July 1898 – September 27, 1992) was a Canadian university professor, diplomat, and civil servant. He was the Canadian ambassador to Mexico from 1944 to 1947, and the commissioner of the Northwest Territories from January 14, 1947 to September 15, 1950.

== Life ==
Born in Toronto, the son of Ellis William and Margaret (Irvine) Keenleyside, he moved with his family to British Columbia when he was a few months old. After serving with the Canadian Expeditionary Force during World War I, he received a Bachelor of Arts degree from the University of British Columbia in 1920. He married Katherine Pillsbury in 1924. He received a Master of Arts degree in 1921 and Ph.D. in 1923 from Clark University. He taught history at Clark University, Penn State University, Brown University and Syracuse University. He returned to the University of British Columbia in 1927, but left to work at Macmillan publishers, before joining the Department of External Affairs at the same time as Lester B. Pearson.

In 1929, he was posted to Japan, to open the new Canadian embassy there. He returned to Canada in 1936, and prepared the 1939 royal visit of King George VI and Queen Elizabeth. In 1941, he was appointed Assistant Under-Secretary of State for External Affairs. From 1944 to 1947, he was the Canadian Ambassador to Mexico. From 1940 to 1945, he served on the Canadian Section of the Permanent Joint Board on Defence. He was the commissioner of the Northwest Territories from 1947 to 1950. From 1947 to 1949, he was the Deputy Minister of Mines and Resources. From 1950 to 1958, he was the director general of the United Nations' Technical Assistance Administration. From 1959 to 1962, he was the chairman of the British Columbia Power Commission and co-chairman at the British Columbia Hydro and Power Authority from 1962 to 1969. He retired in 1969.

From 1969 to 1977, he served as Chancellor and Chairman of the Board of Governors of Notre Dame University College.

He published a two-volume memoir: Hammer the Golden Day and On the Bridge of Time.

== Honours ==
Hugh Llewellyn Keenleyside
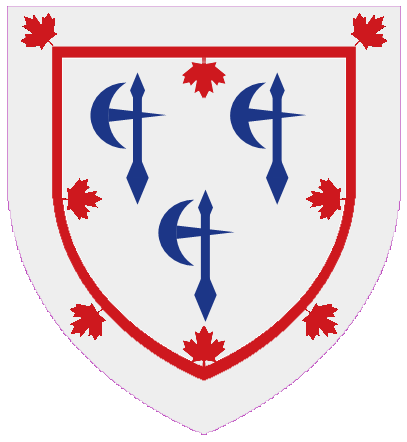
- Crest: Rising from a mount Vert a beacon Sable fired Gules.
- Shield: Argent three battle axes Azure within a tressure érablé counter-érablé Gules.
- Supporters: Upon a mount Vert rising above waves of the sea Azure crested Argent dexter a black tailed deer Ermine attired Or gorged with a collar of holly leaves Vert fructed Gules, pendant therefrom a plate charged with representation of a globe on a stand Azure, sinister a cougar Ermine armed Or gorged with a like collar and plate charged with an open book Argent bound Azure.
- Motto: Honour And Courtesy

In 1969, he was made a Companion of the Order of Canada "for service at the United Nations and in public administration". He also was the 1982 recipient of the Pearson Medal of Peace for his work in public service. The Hugh Keenleyside Dam on the Columbia River in British Columbia is named in his honour. He was awarded an honorary degree from the University of British Columbia in 1945 and an honorary Doctor of Laws from his alma mater Clark University in 1951.
