= Arturo Hernández =

Arturo Hernández may refer to:

- Arturo Hernández (lawyer), Puerto Rican attorney and gubernatorial candidate
- Arturo Hernández (badminton) (born 1991), Mexican male badminton player
- Arturo Estrada Hernández (born 1925), Mexican painter
- Arturo Hernández Basave, Mexican diplomat
