= Embassy of Mexico, Ottawa =

Diplomatic mission of Mexico to Canada

Coordinates: 45.4214°N 75.6984°W

Embassy of Mexico in Canada
- Embajada de México en Canadá

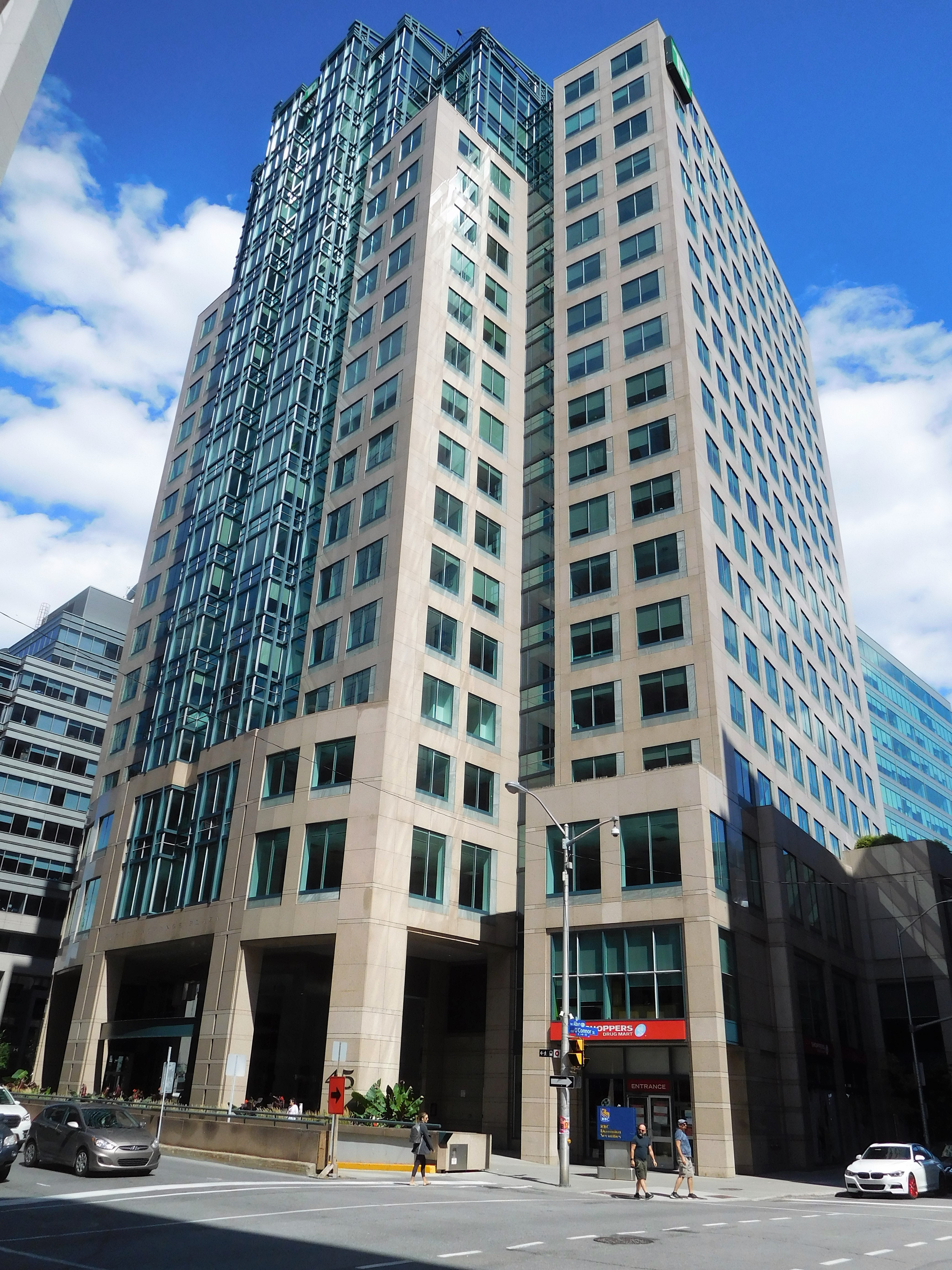
- Incumbent; Carlos Manuel Joaquin Gonzalez since 2023
- Style: Excellency
- Type: Diplomatic mission
- Status: Active
- Reports to: Secretariat of Foreign Affairs
- Seat: World Exchange Plaza Tower I 45 O'Connor St; Ottawa, ON
- Appointer: President of Mexico with Senate advice and consent
- Term length: No set term length
- Formation: 1944
- First holder: Francisco del Río y Cañedo
- Website: www.embamex.sre.gob.mx/canada

The Embassy of Mexico in Canada, based out of Ottawa, is the primary diplomatic mission from Mexico to Canada.

Relations between the two nations were formally established on 30 January 1944, with Mexico eventually opening a consulate in Montreal in 1952. This consulate was later upgraded to an embassy and moved to Ottawa.

== Location ==
The embassy is located at 45 O´Connor Street, Suite 1000, Ottawa, Ontario.

== Ambassadors ==
The following is a list of Ambassadors from Mexico to Canada since the formation of relations:

Term	Ambassador	President
1944 – 1946	Francisco del Río y Cañedo	Manuel Ávila Camacho
1946 – 1946	José Luis Ignacio Rodríguez Taboada	Manuel Ávila Camacho
1946 – 1947	Armando González Mendoza (Interim)	Miguel Alemán Valdés
1947 – 1952	Primo Villa Michel	Miguel Alemán Valdés
1952 – 1953	Juan Manuel Álvarez del Castillo	Alemán Valdés; Adolfo Ruiz Cortines
1953 – 1954	Ignacio Daniel Silva Arias (Interim)	Ruiz Cortines
1954 – 1956	Salvador Pardo Bolland (Interim)	Ruiz Cortines
1956 – 1959	Manuel Maples Arce	Ruiz Cortines; Adolfo López Mateos
1959 – 1962	Rafael de la Colina Riquelme	López Mateos
1962 – 1965	Rafael Urdaneta de la Tour	López Mateos; Gustavo Díaz Ordaz
1965 – 1968	Pedro Suinaga Luján	Díaz Ordaz
1968 – 1977	Rafael Urdaneta de la Tour	Díaz Ordaz; Luis Echeverría; José López Portillo
1977 – 1983	Agustín Barrios-Gómez-Méndez	López Portillo; Miguel de la Madrid
1983 – 1987	José Andrés de Oteyza Fernández	Madrid
1987 – 1989	Ángel Emilio Carrillo Gamboa	Madrid; Carlos Salinas de Gortari
1989 – 1991	Alfredo Phillips Olmedo	Salinas de Gortari
1991 – 1993	Jorge de la Vega Domínguez	Salinas de Gortari
1993 – 1998	Sandra Camila Antonia Fuentes-Beráin Villenave	Salinas de Gortari; Ernesto Zedillo
1998 – 2001	Ezequiel Padilla Couttolenc	Zedillo; Vicente Fox
2001 – 2006	María Teresa García Segovia	Fox
2006 – 2009	Emilio Rafael José Goicoechea Luna	Felipe Calderón
2009 – 2013	Francisco Barrio Terrazas	Calderón; Enrique Peña Nieto
2013 – 2015	Francisco Suárez Dávila	Peña Nieto
2015 – 2017	Agustín García López Loaeza	Peña Nieto
2017 – 2019	Dionisio Pérez Jácome Friscione	Peña Nieto; Andrés Manuel López Obrador
2019 – 2022	Juan José Gómez Camacho	López Obrador
2022 – 2023	Arturo Hernández Basave	López Obrador
2023 – Present	Carlos Manuel Joaquin Gonzalez	López Obrador Claudia Sheinbaum

== Consulates ==
Mexico also maintains three consulates general, two consulates and four honorary consulates in Canada:

Location	Consulate type	Consul	Jurisdiction
Montreal, Quebec	Consulate general	Alejandro Estivill	Quebec, Newfoundland and Labrador, New Brunswick, Nova Scotia, Prince Edward Island and Nunavut
Toronto, Ontario	Consulate general	Porfirio Thierry Muñoz Ledo	Ontario and Manitoba
Vancouver, British Columbia	Consulate general	Berenice Díaz Ceballos	British Columbia, Yukon and Northwest Territories
Calgary, Alberta	Consulate	Juana María Ruíz	Alberta and Saskatchewan
Leamington, Ontario	Consulate	Darío Alberto Bernal Acero	Essex County (South) and Ontario
Winnipeg, Manitoba	Honorary consulate	James Erwin Downey	N/A
Dartmouth, Nova Scotia	Honorary consulate	Galo Carrera	N/A
Quebec City, Quebec	Honorary consulate	Micheline Dessureault	N/A
St. John's, Newfoundland and Labrador	Honorary consulate	Edward Scott Mcclellan	N/A

Additionally, the following government secretariat departments also maintain attaché offices in the Ottawa Embassy:

- Secretariat of National Defense (Military and Air Attaché Office)
- Secretariat of the Navy (Naval Attaché Office)
- Secretariat of the Economy

== See also ==
- Canada–Mexico relations
- Embassy of Canada, Mexico City
- Foreign relations of Canada
- Foreign relations of Mexico
- List of diplomatic missions of Mexico
- Mexican Secretariat of Foreign Affairs
