= Canadian Mexicans =

Mexican citizens of Canadian descent

Canadian Mexicans canadiense-mexicanos
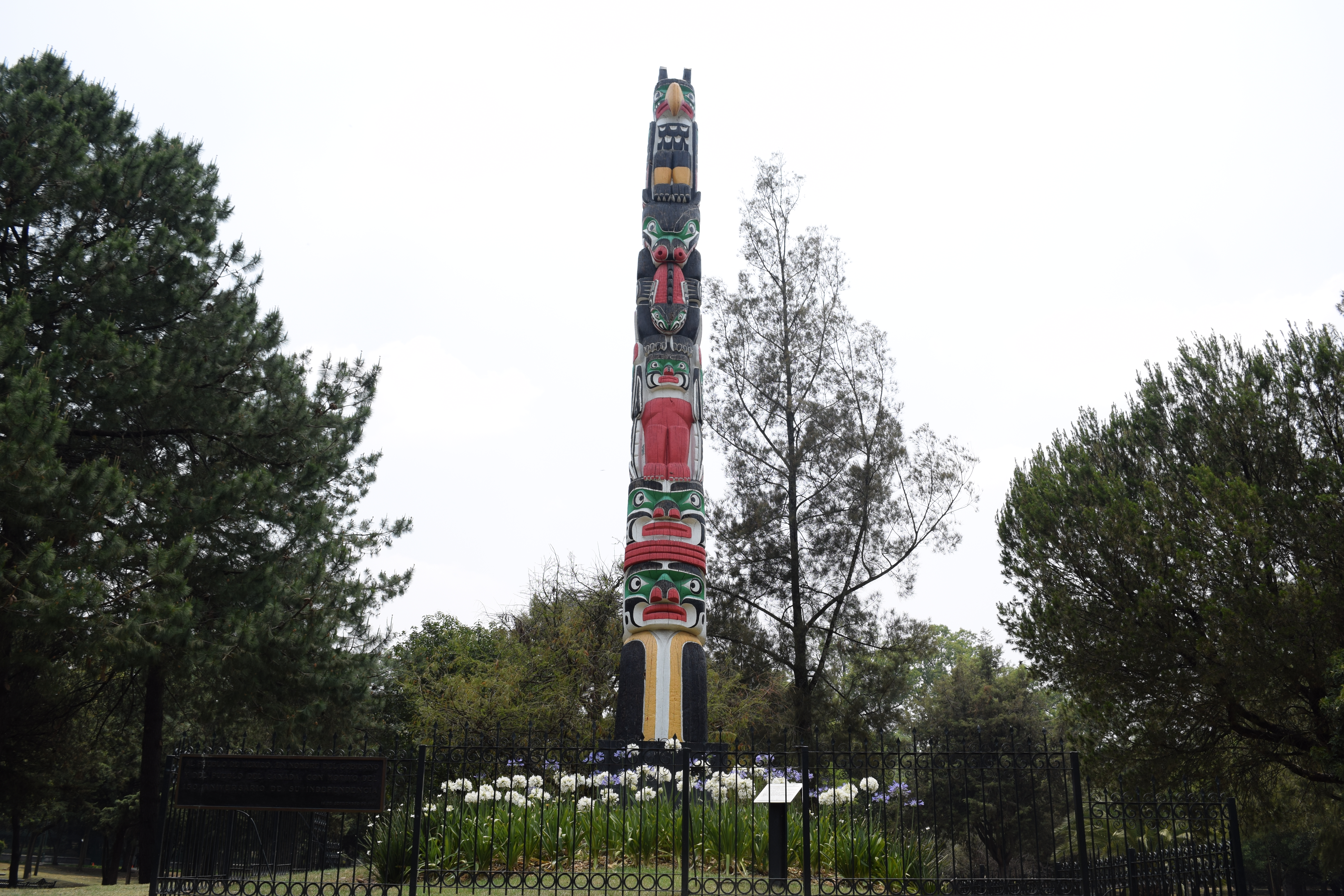
- The tótem canadiense of Chapultepec

Total population
- 18,294 Canadian nationals residing in Mexico (2020); Unknown number of Mexicans of Canadian descent

Regions with significant populations
- Guadalajara, Mexico City, Monterrey, San Miguel de Allende, Puerto Vallarta, Ajijic, Chapala, Toluca, Valle de Bravo, Malinalco, Ixtapan de la Sal, Morelia, Cancun, Playa del Carmen, Mérida, Huatulco, Puerto Escondido, rural areas of Chihuahua, Durango, Zacatecas

Languages
- Mexican Spanish · Canadian English · Canadian French

Religion
- Roman Catholicism · Protestantism · Others

Related ethnic groups
- other Canadian diasporas

Canadian Mexicans are Mexican citizens with Canadian ancestry or immigrants from Canada.

An important Canadian-descended group is the Plautdietsch-speaking "Russian" Mennonites and their descendants, who emigrated from Canada to Mexico starting in 1922.

== History ==
=== Early immigration ===
Individuals born in what is now Canada have been present in Mexico since the early republic. For example, the Quebec-born Michel Branamour Menard was a settler in Mexican Texas and became a Mexican citizen.

In 1851, French Canadian doctor Jean Auguste Clouthier settled in Sinaloa. He is an ancestor of the Clouthier political family.

An important Canadian immigrant was engineer Carlos Henry Bosdet, who set up the first telephone line in Mexico in 1878.

Canadian immigrants were first tabulated in the 1900 census. A total of 140 individuals, 102 men and 38 women, were counted.

=== Mennonite immigration ===
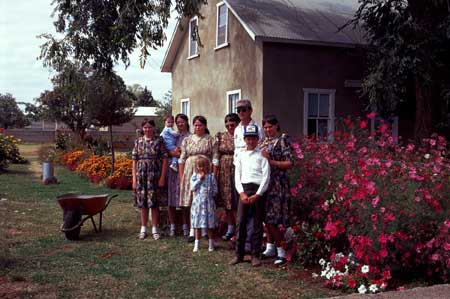
Mennonite family in Cuauhtémoc, Chihuahua

The ancestors of the Mennonites living in Mexico arrived via Canada. Migration to Mexico took place mainly from 1922 to 1927, with smaller groups coming after World War II.

The 1930 census counted 7,779 Canadian immigrants; 3,862 men and 3,917 women. Most, but not all, of these immigrants were Mennonites.

The first settlers moved to the State of Chihuahua (near Cuauhtemoc) and Durango (near Nuevo Ideal). Later daughter-settlements in other states were established (San Luis Potosí, Sinaloa, Sonora, Zacatecas, Campeche, Quintana Roo and Tamaulipas). Today, there are about 100,000 Mennonites in Mexico.

=== Recent immigration ===
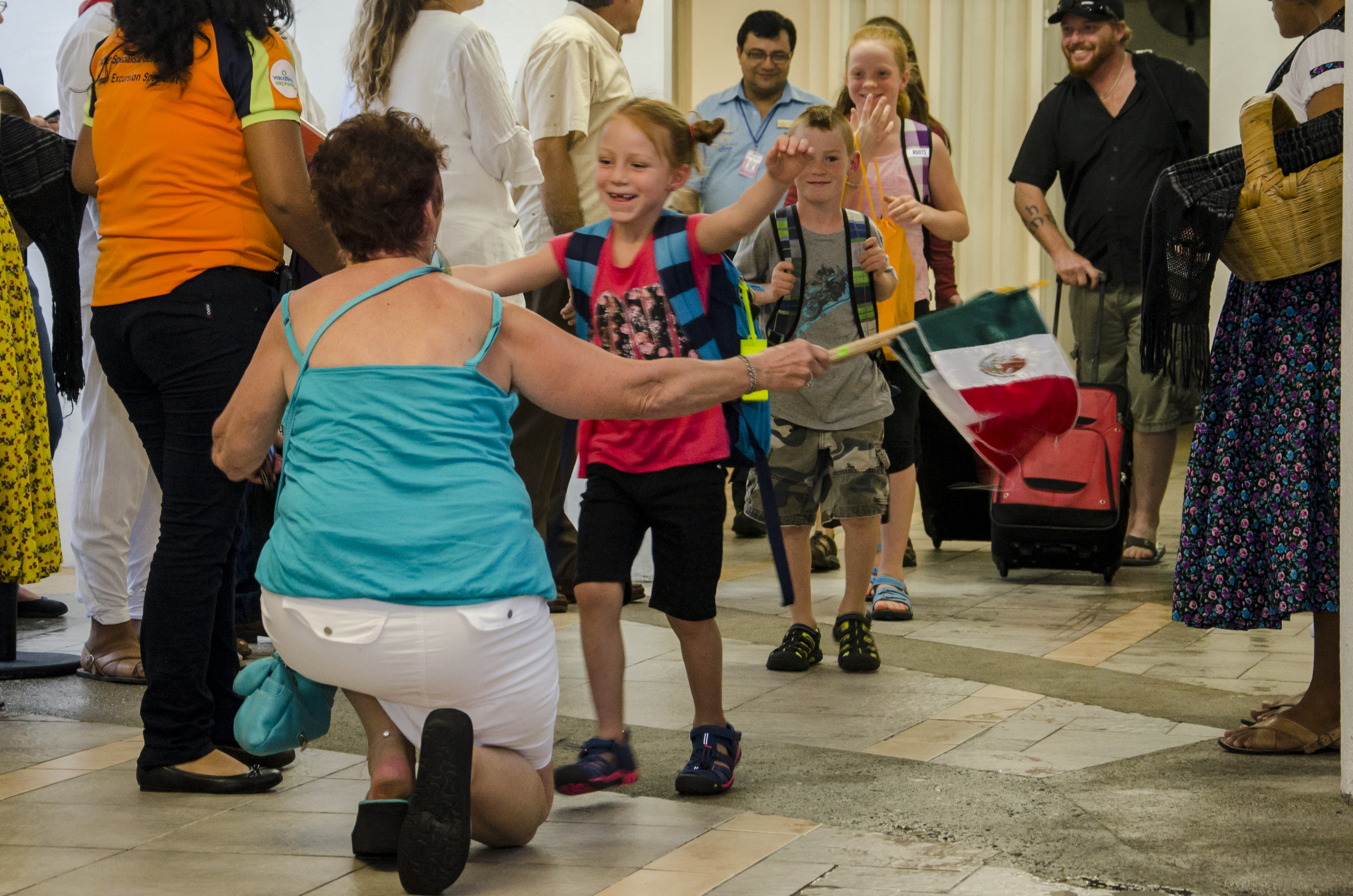
Canadian visitors reunite with family in Huatulco International Airport. Huatulco has a large resident Canadian community.

Contemporary Canadian emigrants to Mexico consist mainly of working professionals that settle in larger cities and retired individuals living in smaller towns.

According to Canada's Department of Foreign Affairs and International Trade, there are about 6,000 Canadians living in Mexico, but only 3,000 are registered with the Canadian Embassy in Mexico City. According to statistics from Mexico's National Institute of Statistics and Geography, in 2009 there were 10,869 Canadian-born persons living in Mexico.

According to INEGI's 2020 census, there are 12,439 Canadian-born emigrants residing in Mexico.

== Notable individuals ==
- Arnold Belkin, artist
- Alex Phillips, cinematographer
- Fannie Kauffman, actress
- Vampiro, pro wrestler
- Luisa Wilson, hockey player

== See also ==
- Canada–Mexico relations
- Mexican Canadian
- American Mexican
