= Embassy of Canada, Mexico City =

Diplomatic mission of Canada to Mexico

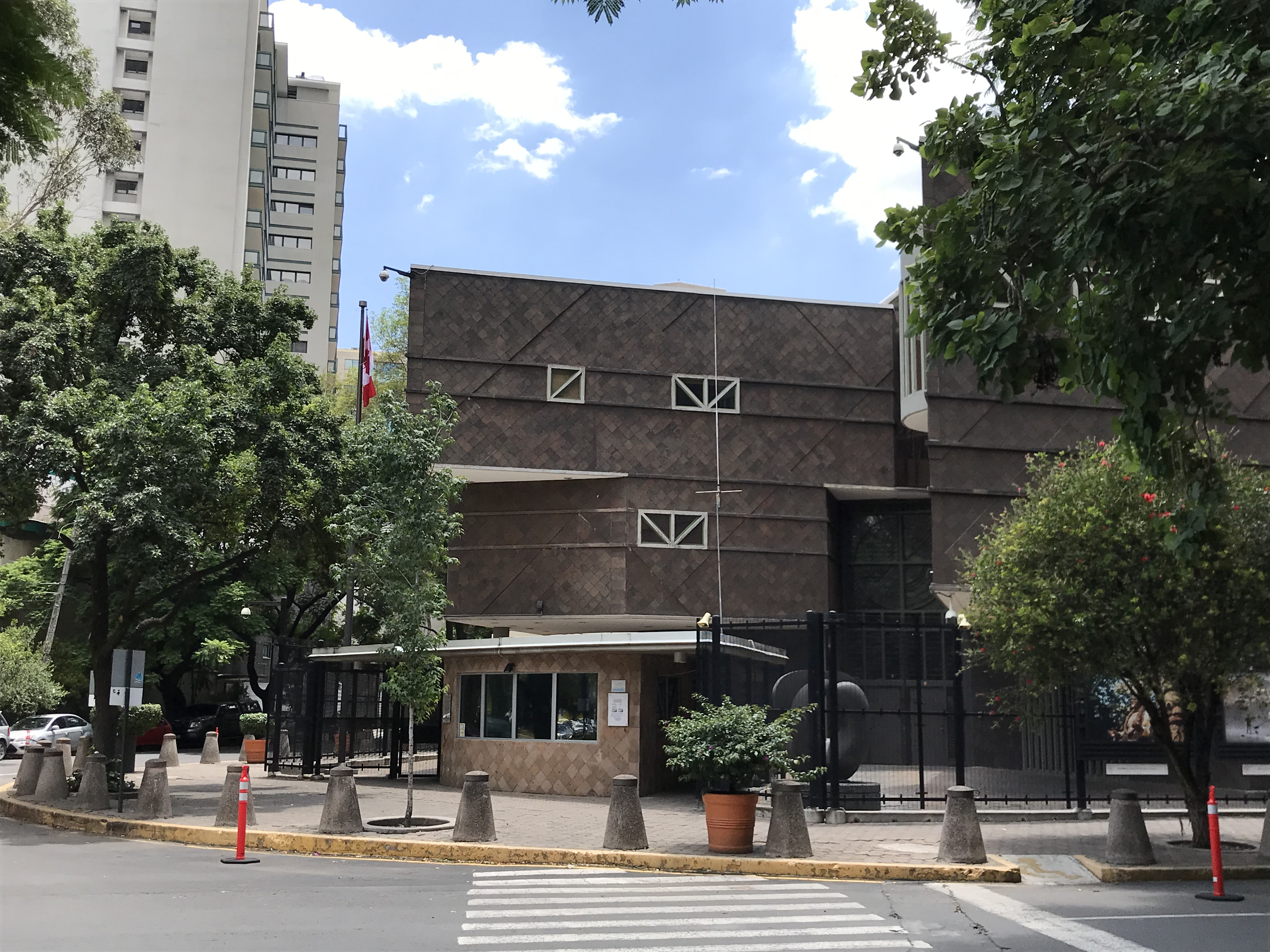
- Address: Schiller 529, Col. Bosque de Chapultepec (Polanco)
- Coordinates: 19°25′44.3716″N 99°11′10.2646″W
- Ambassador: Graeme C. Clark

The Canadian Embassy building in Mexico City was designed by Étienne Gaboury of Winnipeg, previously noted as a church architect, and was inaugurated in 1982. Located at Schiller 529, Col. Bosque de Chapultepec (Polanco), it is a "celebrated" design which features many metaphors meant to evoke various natural landscapes of Canada, as well as integrating a Spanish colonial style courtyard. The total area of the building is 6,500 square metres (70,000 sq ft), including an artium on the first floor, a multipurpose room for hosting events, and an employee cafeteria. The two upper floors contain the diplomatic, cultural, and business offices. Artwork inside the building includes silk banners in autumn colours by Takeo Tanabe and a large wooden totem pole by Tony Hunt.

The embassy delivers a wide variety of services including consular, international business development, and general relations programs by 28 Canada-based diplomats, who are supported by 81 locally-engaged employees.

This building was part of a wave of Canadian embassy construction during the 1970s and 80s meant to win Canada more international exposure and to demonstrate the success of Canadian federalism and internationalism.

== See also ==
- Canada–Mexico relations
- List of ambassadors of Canada to Mexico
- Embassy of Mexico, Ottawa
