= Mexican Canadians =

Ethnic group

Mexican Canadians Canadiens mexicains mexicanos-canadienses
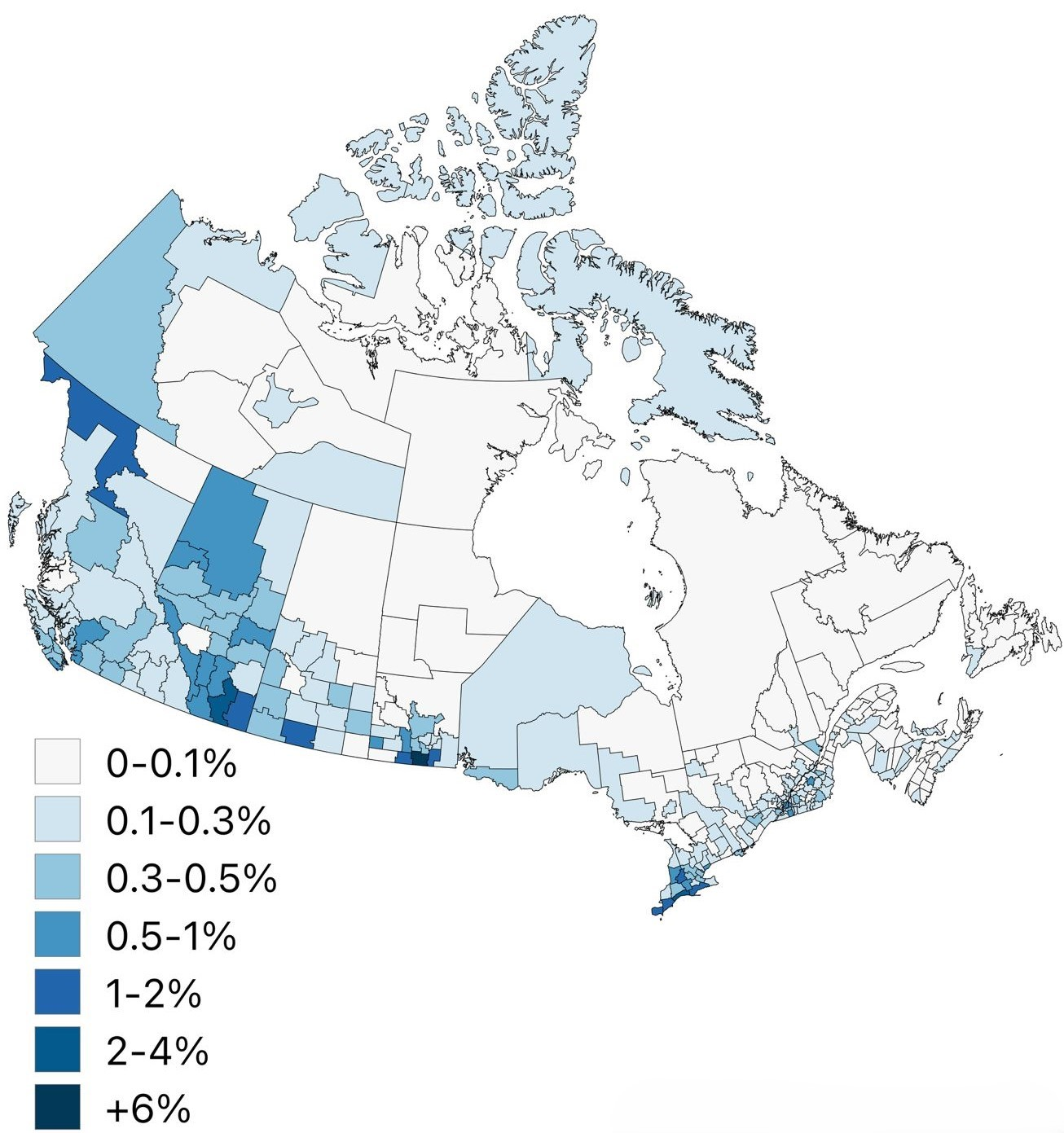
- Population distribution of Mexican Canadians by census division, 2021 census

Total population
- 155,380 (less than 0.5% of Canadian residents by ancestry, 2021 Census); 90,585 (by birth, 2021 Census)

Regions with significant populations
- Greater Toronto Area • Brampton • Leamington and Windsor area, Ontario • Greater Montreal • Metro Vancouver • Calgary–Edmonton Corridor • Sarnia

Languages
- English, French, Spanish, and a minority of indigenous Mexican languages.

Religion
- Roman Catholicism, Protestantism and Indigenous beliefs.

Related ethnic groups
- Mexican people, Mestizo, Spanish people, Latinos, American Canadians, Guatemalan Canadians, Native Americans.

Mexican Canadians (Spanish: mexicano-canadienses, French: Canadiens mexicains) are Canadian citizens of Mexican origin, either through birth or ethnicity, who reside in Canada. According to the 2021 Census, 155,380 Canadians indicated they were of full or partial Mexican ancestry (0.42% of the country's population). They are part of the broader Latin American Canadian community.

While the Mexican-origin population in Canada is relatively small, Canada has the third largest Mexican population after the United States and Mexico. Nevertheless, Canada's Mexican population is far behind that of the United States, where, as of 2021, there were 38.2 million people of Mexican ancestry, comprising 12.2% of the population.

As the Canadian Hispanic population is estimated as per 2023 at being over 3% of the population, twice from what it was in 2016, the Mexican population most likely had risen as well along with people of other Latin American groups.

== Demographics ==
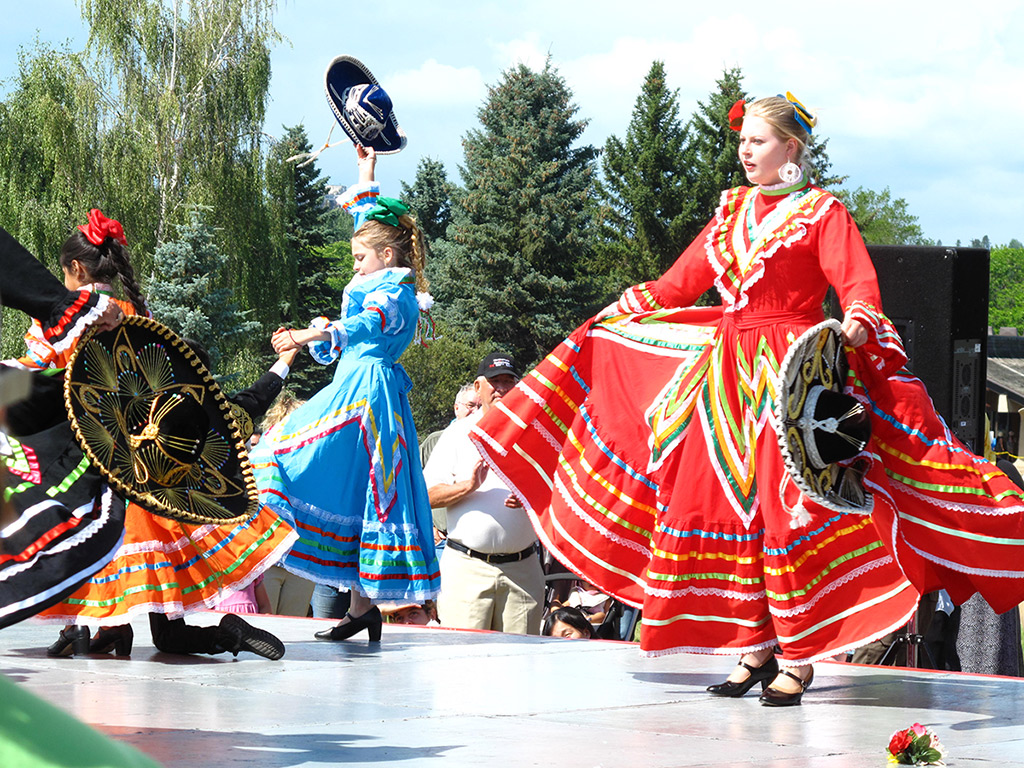
Mexican heritage days in Edmonton.

The metropolitan areas with the largest populations of people with Mexico-related origins (2023) are: Montreal (40,795; 3.9%), Greater Toronto Area (60,969; 4.3%), Vancouver (30,995; 2.5%), Calgary (10,965; 1.4%), Edmonton (9,830; 1.3%), Ottawa (5,865; 0.9%). Brampton, a suburb of Toronto contains a growing Mexican community migrating outside of the Toronto city limits.

== Geographical extent ==
While approximately 5,000 people of Mexico origin enter Canada each year as temporary students or contract workers for agriculture. However, these are not counted as immigrants because of their explicitly temporary legal status. Unlike the United States’ Bracero program, the temporary-worker program in Canada has various mechanisms to discourage workers from overstaying their permits.

Migrant workers from Mexico are prevalent in Leamington, Ontario's cucumber and tomato harvesting industry. Leamington has one of the largest Mexico-born communities in Canada. There are 2,700 Mexican immigrants living in Leamington, as of 2011.

In the Okanagan Valley of British Columbia, Mexico-born labourers are employed in the wine and orchard industries. Kelowna has a sizeable community of Mexico-born. In the summer of 2016, about 2,000 of Mexico-origin labourers were working on Okanagan Valley farms. Langley, British Columbia has a Mexican population working and/or living in town, having a Hispanic grocery store, mainly Mexican, and Central and South American products.

== Statistics ==
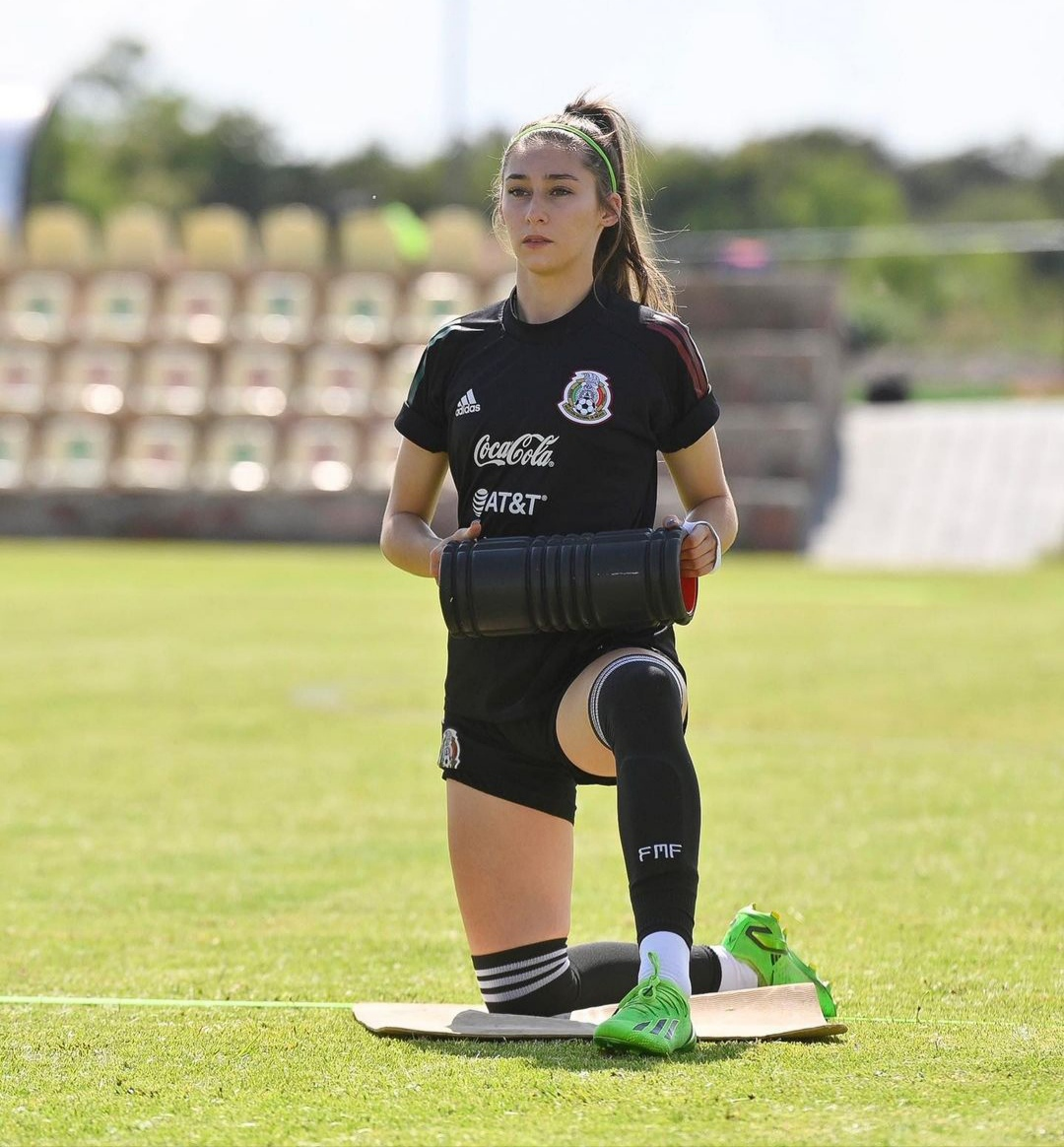
Tatiana Flores

Population by ancestry by Canadian province or territory
Province	Population (2016)	Population (2021)
Ontario	43,120	54,725
Quebec	26,935	34,310
British Columbia	23,055	28,445
Alberta	22,470	25,450
Manitoba	8,790	7,430
Saskatchewan	2,125	2,620
Nova Scotia	810	930
New Brunswick	695	985
Newfoundland and Labrador	240	135
Prince Edward Island	95	255
Yukon	90	145
Northwest Territories	55	45
Nunavut	10	20
Canada	128,380	155,495

Number of Mexican nationals granted permanent residence in Canada by year
Year	Number of Mexican nationals admitted	Total number of permanent residents admitted	Proportion of permanent residents admitted
2002	1,918	229,048	0.8%
2003	1,738	221,349	0.8%
2004	2,245	235,823	1%
2005	2,854	262,242	1.1%
2006	2,830	251,640	1.1%
2007	3,224	236,753	1.4%
2008	2,831	247,246	1.1%
2009	3,104	252,174	1.2%
2010	3,866	280,691	1.4%
2011	3,642	248,748	1.5%

== See also ==
- Canadian Mexicans
- Latin American Canadians
- Spanish Canadians
- Canada–Mexico relations
