= Canada–Mexico relations =

- Canada: Mexico

Diplomatic mission
- Embassy of Canada, Mexico City: Embassy of Mexico, Ottawa

Envoy
- Ambassador Graeme C. Clark: Ambassador Carlos Joaquín González

The nations of Canada and Mexico established formal diplomatic relations in 1944. Initially, ties between the two nations were dormant, but since the 1990s relations between Canada and Mexico have positively developed as both countries brokered NAFTA.

Both nations are members of the Asia-Pacific Economic Cooperation, G20 major economies, Lima Group, Organization of American States, OECD, United Nations and the World Trade Organization.

== History ==
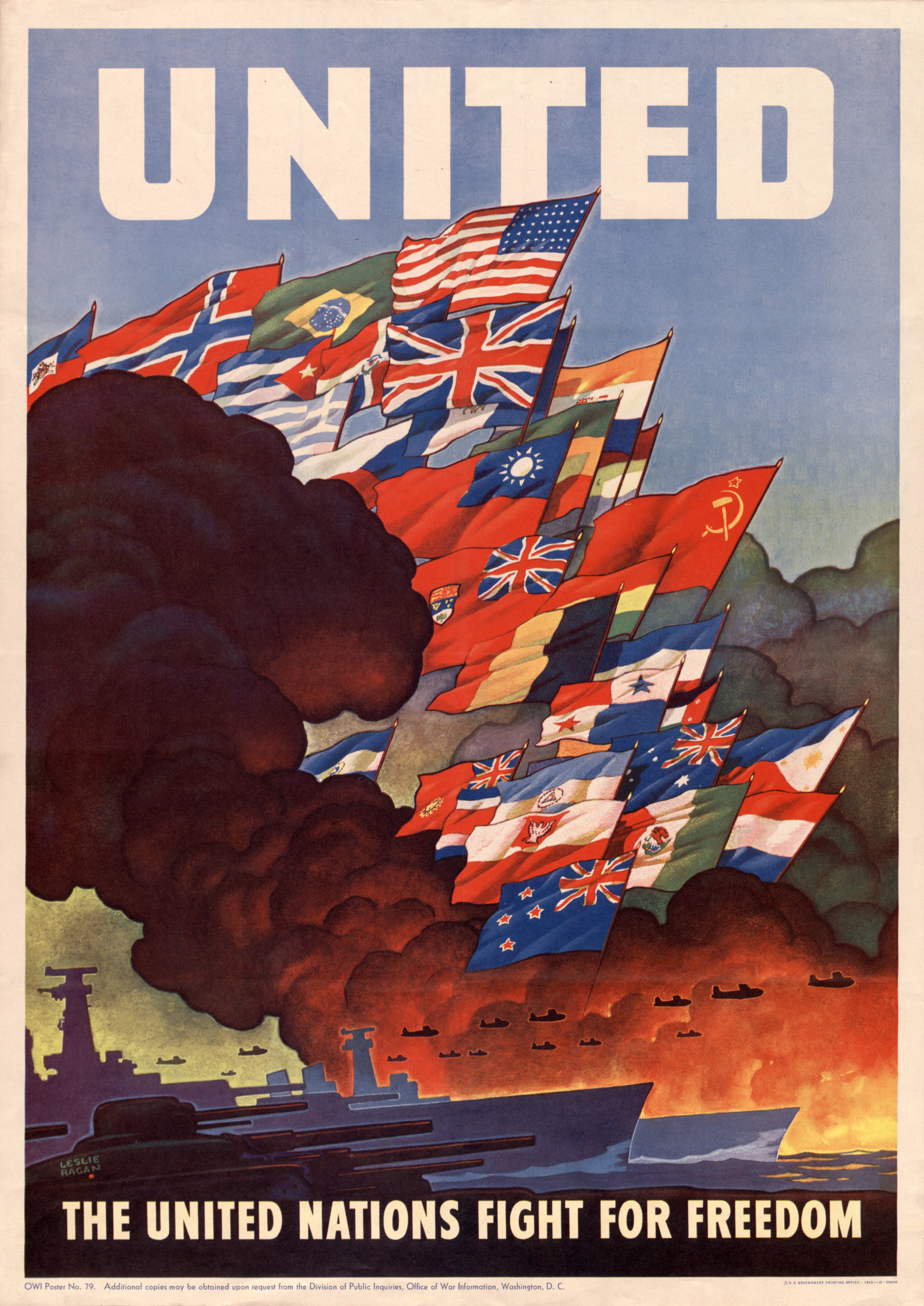
Canada and Mexico are both founding members of the United Nations

Before Canada became an independent nation, there had been previous contacts between Canada and Mexico in the 1800s. Canadian made products were sold in Mexico under British companies' logos. Since gaining independence from the United Kingdom in 1867; Canada delayed in establishing diplomatic relations with Mexico due to the expropriation of foreign oil companies in 1938. At the time, Canada felt obliged to follow other nations in isolating Mexico economically and diplomatically. Formal relations between the two nations did not begin until 30 January 1944, at the height of Second World War, which both countries participated in on the Allied side. In 1952, Mexico opened its first consulate-general in Montreal.

The first ever meeting between leaders of both nations took place in White Sulphur Springs, West Virginia in 1956 between Mexican President Adolfo Ruiz Cortines, Canadian Prime Minister Louis St. Laurent and American President Dwight D. Eisenhower. In 1959, President Adolfo López Mateos chose to visit Canada on his first official visit abroad. The visit was reciprocated by Prime Minister John Diefenbaker in 1960. Since then, almost every Mexican President has visited Canada at least once and almost every Canadian Prime Minister has visited Mexico.

In 1968, a joint ministerial commission was set up by both nations to meet every two years to discuss and analyze mutual interests in promoting development and deepening bilateral relations. In 1974, an agreement was signed between both nations to allow temporary migrant workers from Mexico to work in Canada.

=== NAFTA ===
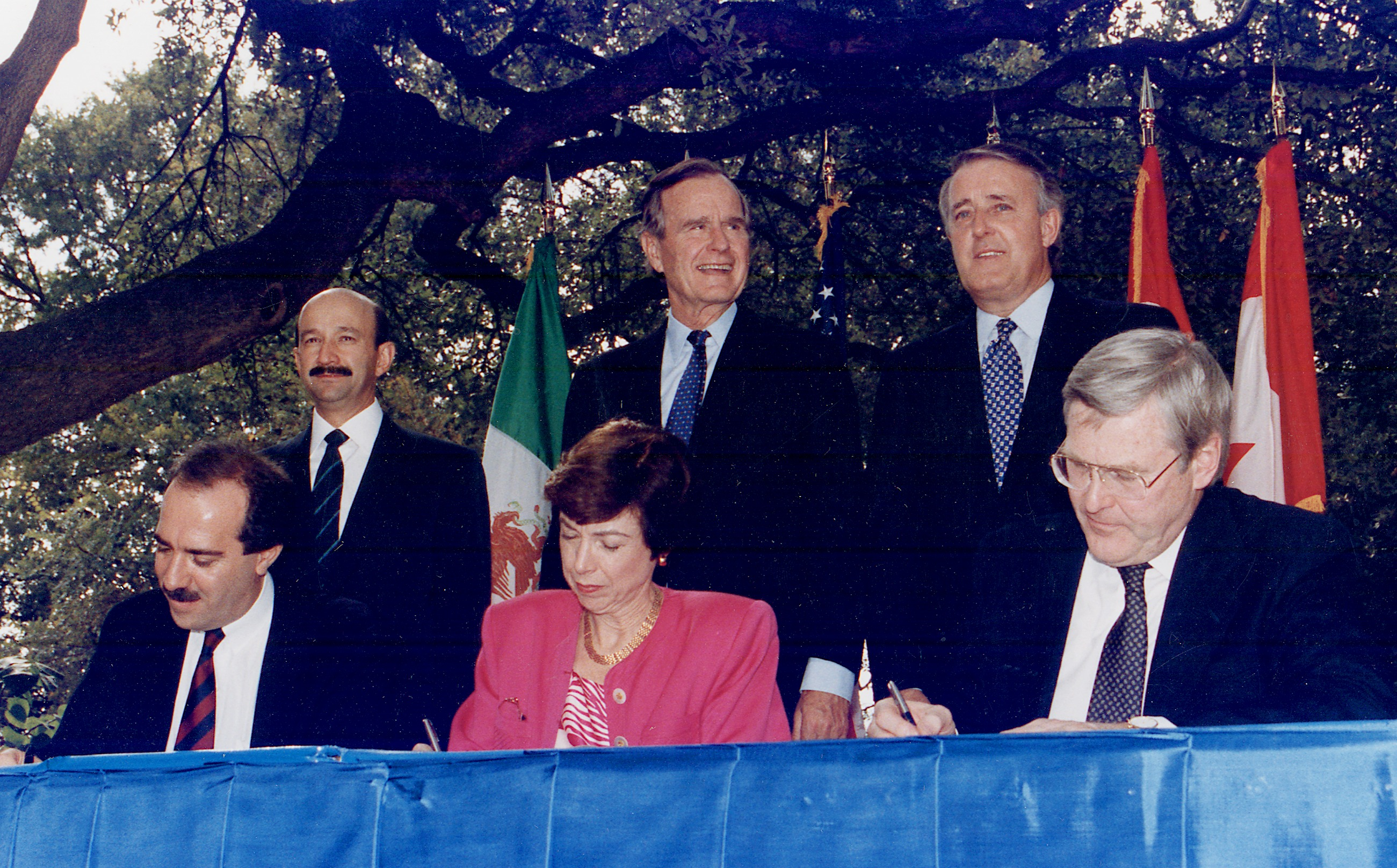
American, Canadian, and Mexican dignitaries initialing the NAFTA draft, October 1992. President Carlos Salinas de Gortari, President George H. W. Bush, Prime Minister Brian Mulroney are pictured in the background.

In 1990, leaders of Canada, Mexico and the United States began negotiating a free trade agreement that would be known as the North American Free Trade Agreement (NAFTA). Canada had just signed a free trade agreement with the United States in 1988 (FTA) when the US, under President George H. W. Bush, began to negotiate another pact with Mexico under President Carlos Salinas de Gortari. The Canadian government under Prime Minister Brian Mulroney feared that the advantages Canada had through the Canada-US FTA would be undermined, and asked to become a party to the US-Mexican talks. The result was that NAFTA replaced the previous Canada-US FTA. An agreement was reached between all three nations and NAFTA came into effect on 1 January 1994. Since NAFTA has come into force, the two countries have become much more important to each other, and often collaborate when dealing with the United States.

Relations between the two governments were particularly strong during the first decade of the twenty-first century. In October 2006, then President-elect Felipe Calderón visited Ottawa, and Prime Minister Stephen Harper attended the inauguration of President Calderón. The two leaders were ideological allies, both being pro-market conservatives, Calderón of the National Action Party and Harper of the Conservative Party.

In November 2012, President-elect Enrique Peña Nieto also chose to visit Ottawa as a president-elect before taking the presidential oath. In an editorial in The Globe and Mail on that occasion Peña Nieto characterized the relationship before 1994 as one of "mutual benign neglect" but praised the increase in trade and travel between the two countries since NAFTA. He called for increased Canadian foreign direct investment in Mexico, especially in the petroleum industry, though he said that Pemex, the state oil company, would remain the owner of the resources. As well he called "North American energy security" a "common goal" of both countries. Peña Nieto also pledged to work to reduce drug-related violence in the country and protect visiting Canadians. He also asked the Canadian government to reconsider a 2009 decision requiring Mexicans to have visas before coming to Canada.

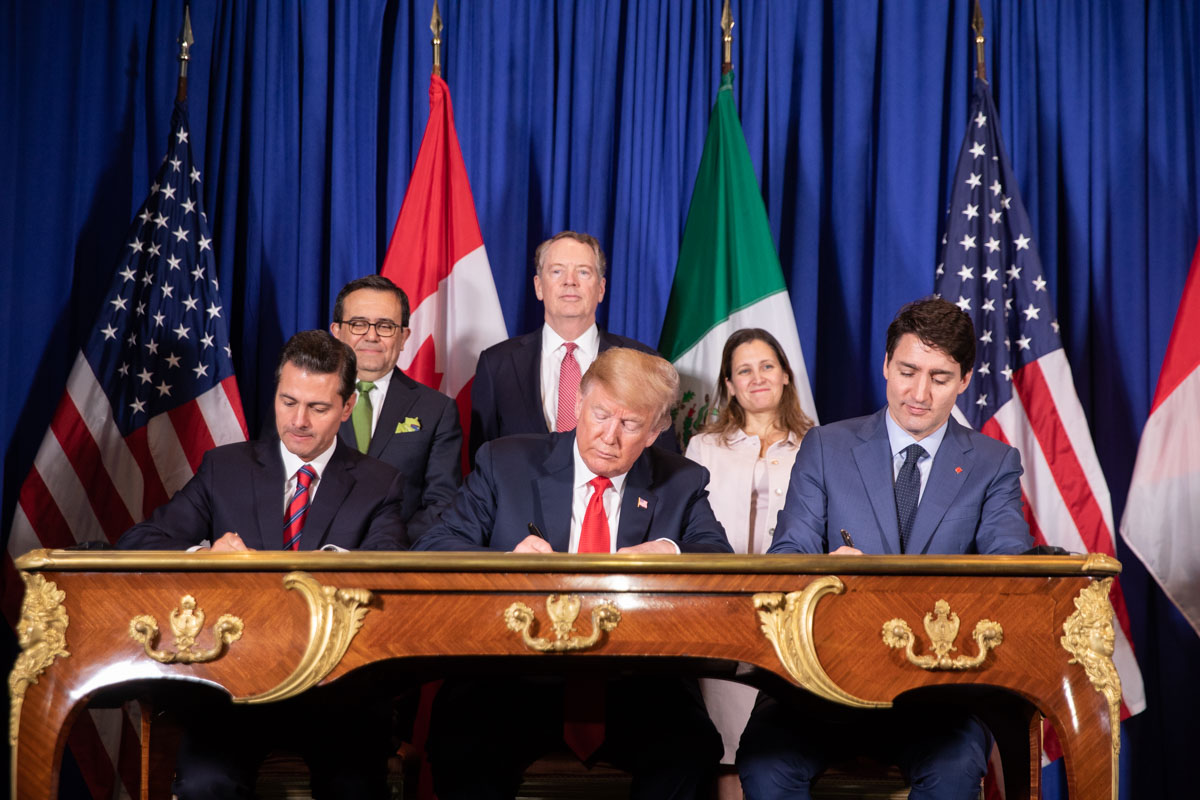
Mexican President Enrique Peña Nieto and Canadian Prime Minister Justin Trudeau signing the USMCA free trade agreement alongside U.S. President Donald Trump in November 2018.

=== USMCA and succeeding years ===
On December 1, 2016, Canada lifted the visa requirement for Mexican citizens. On November 30, 2018, President Enrique Peña Nieto, Prime Minister Justin Trudeau and U.S. President Donald Trump signed the United States–Mexico–Canada Agreement (USMCA) during the G20 summit in Buenos Aires, Argentina. This agreement, if ratified by all three nations, is expected to replace NAFTA. In December 2018, Governor General Julie Payette attended the inauguration of President Andrés Manuel López Obrador.

In January 2023, Canadian Prime Minister Justin Trudeau traveled to Mexico to attend the North American Leaders' Summit in Mexico City. In February 2024, Canada reimposed visitor visa requirements for most Mexican citizens in order to stem the flow of asylum seekers and to limit Mexican citizens from entering Canada visa-free to cross the border into the United States illegally.

In June 2025, Mexican President Claudia Sheinbaum travelled to Canada to attend the 51st G7 summit in Kananaskis, Alberta. While there, President Sheinbaum met with Prime Minister Mark Carney. In September 2025, Prime Minister Carney travelled to Mexico City and met with President Sheinbaum to discuss current relations between both nations. Both leaders also announced a new Canada-Mexico Action Plan, and underscored opportunities to deepen bilateral trade in areas such as infrastructure, energy, agriculture, and health.

In June 2026, Canada and Mexico, alongside the United States, co-hosted the 2026 FIFA World Cup. In July of that same year, Mexican Foreign Secretary Roberto Velasco Álvarez paid a visit to Canada and met with his counterpart Anita Anand.

== High-level visits ==
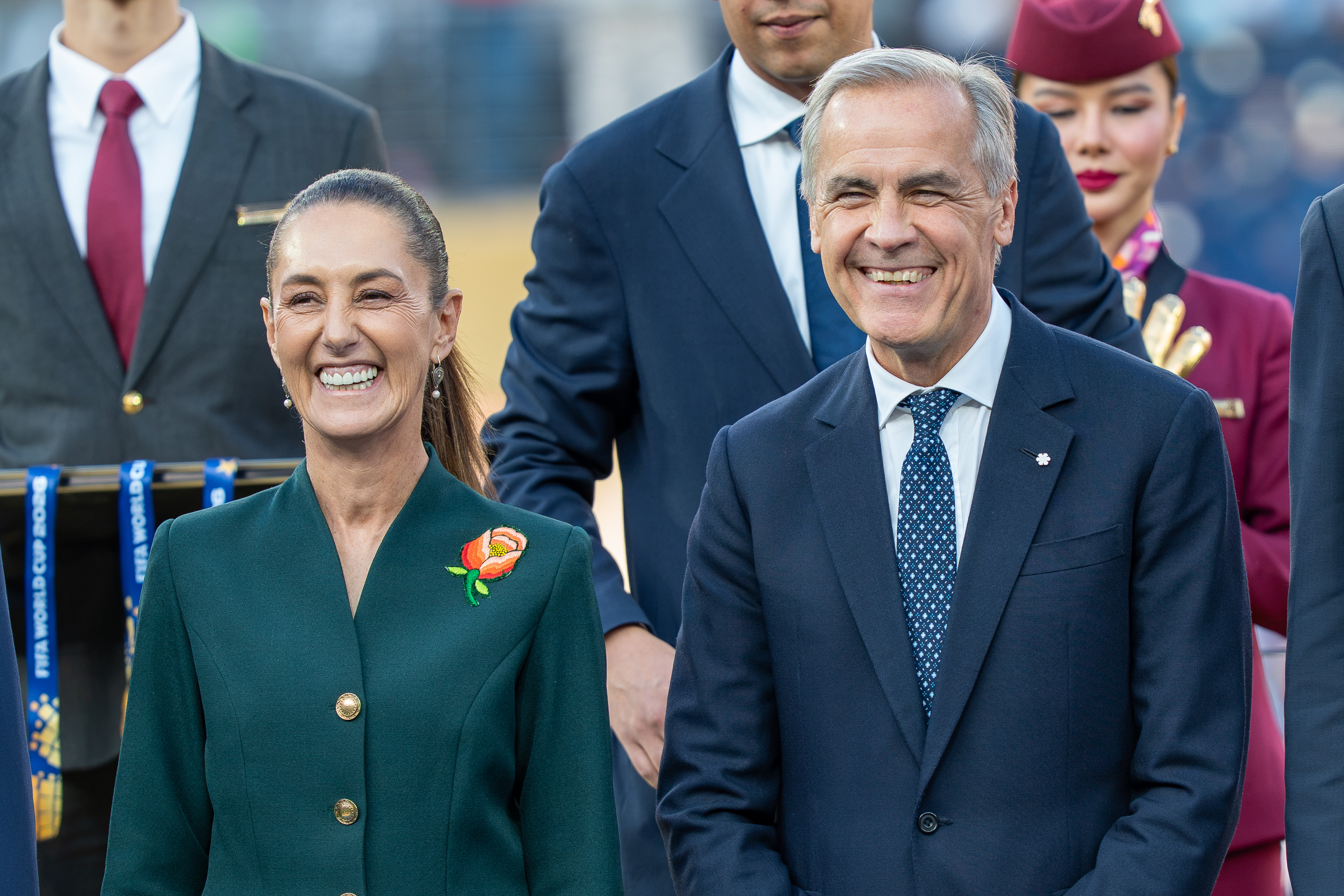
Mexican President Claudia Sheinbaum and Canadian Prime Minister Mark Carney at the FIFA World Cup final in East Rutherford, New Jersey; July 2026.

High-level visits from Canada to Mexico

- Prime Minister John Diefenbaker (1960)
- Prime Minister Pierre Trudeau (1974, 1976, 1981, 1982)
- Prime Minister Brian Mulroney (1990)
- Prime Minister Jean Chrétien (1994, 1999, 2002, 2003)
- Prime Minister Paul Martin (2004)
- Prime Minister Stephen Harper (2006, 2009, 2012, 2014)
- Governor General Michaëlle Jean (2009, 2010)
- Prime Minister Justin Trudeau (2017, 2023)
- Governor General Julie Payette (2018)
- Prime Minister Mark Carney (2025)
- Governor General Mary Simon (2026)

High-level visits from Mexico to Canada

- President Adolfo López Mateos (1959)
- President Luis Echeverría Álvarez (1973)
- President José López Portillo (1980)
- President Miguel de la Madrid Hurtado (1984)
- President Carlos Salinas de Gortari (1991)
- President Ernesto Zedillo (1996, 1997, 1999)
- President Vicente Fox (2001, 2004, 2005)
- President Felipe Calderón (2007, May & June 2010)
- President Enrique Peña Nieto (2016)
- President Claudia Sheinbaum (2025)

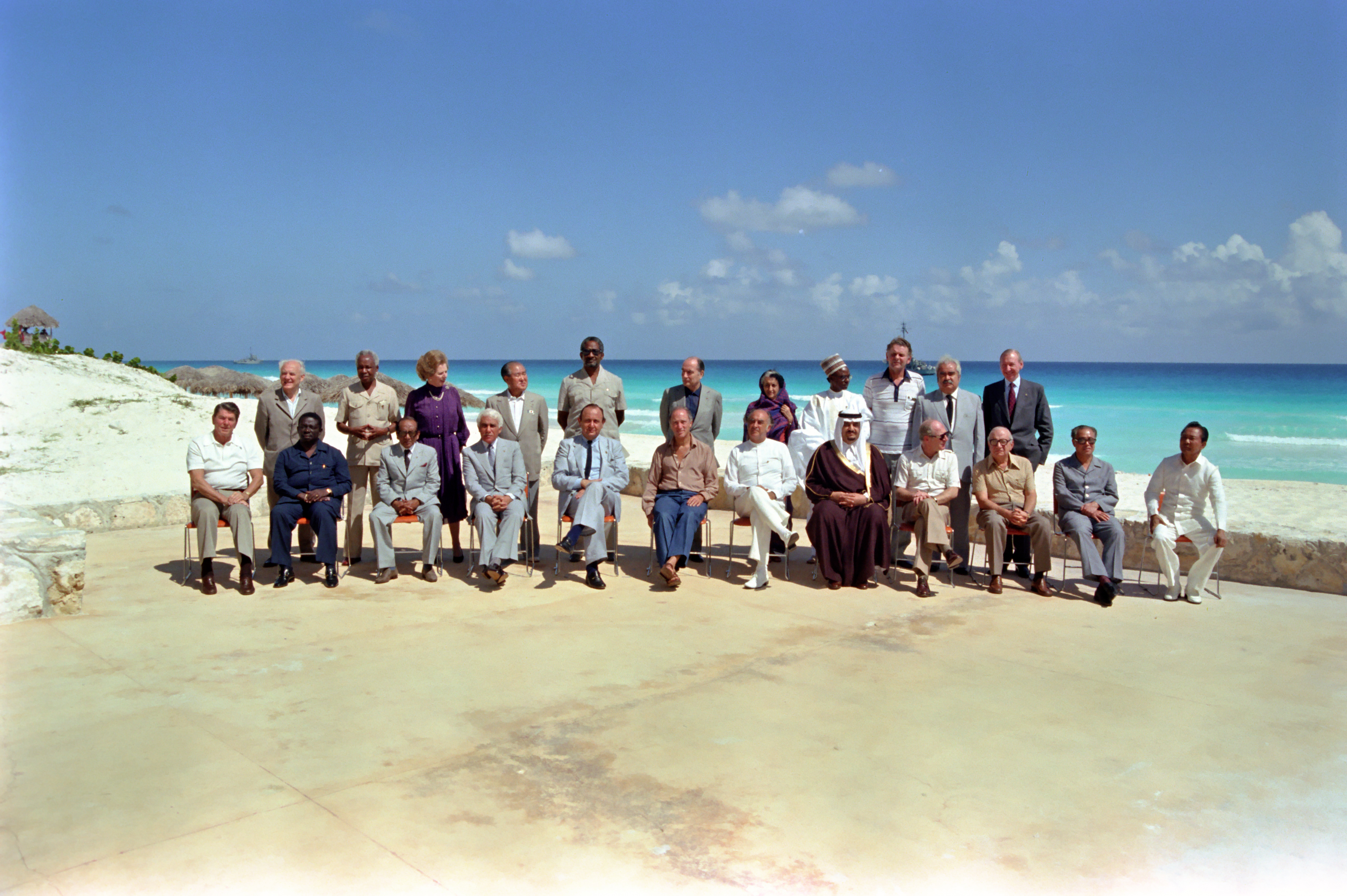
Participants of the North–South Summit in Cancun, including Prime Minister Pierre Trudeau and President José López Portillo; 1981.

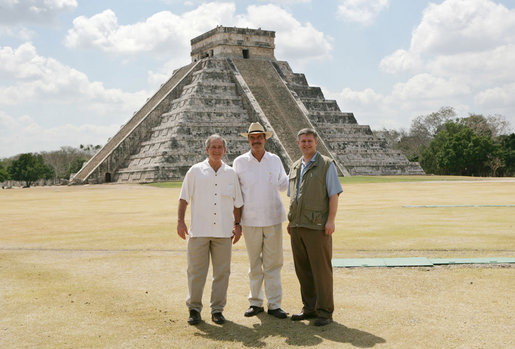
President George W. Bush, President Vicente Fox, and Prime Minister Stephen Harper; stand in front of "El Castillo" in the Chichen Itza Archaeological Ruins; March 2006.

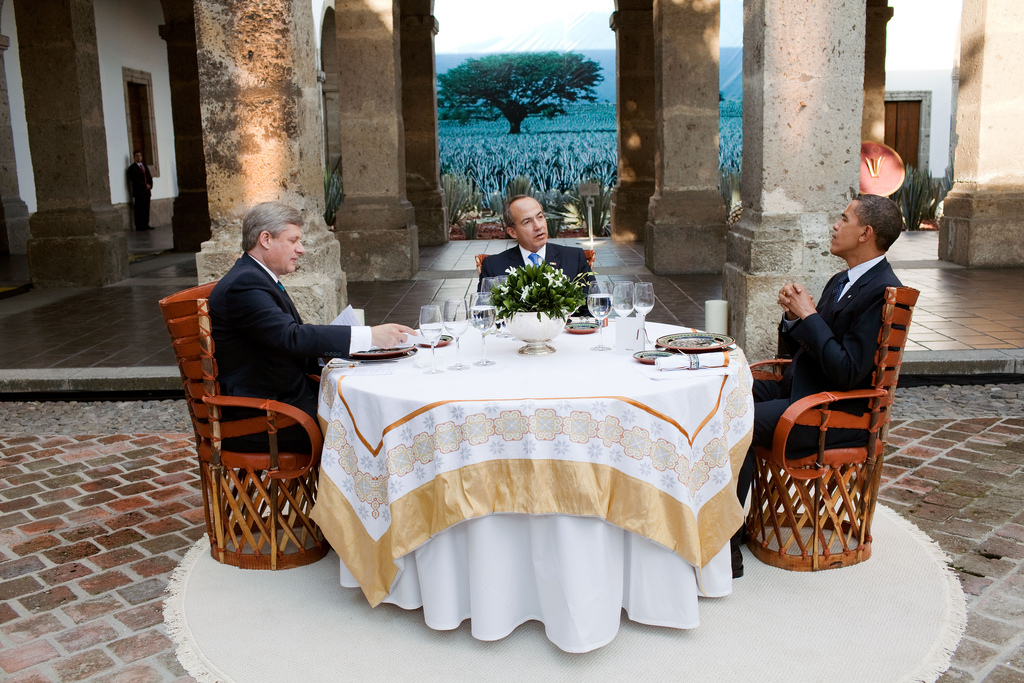
President Barack Obama, President Felipe Calderon and Prime Minister Stephen Harper in Guadalajara; August 2009.

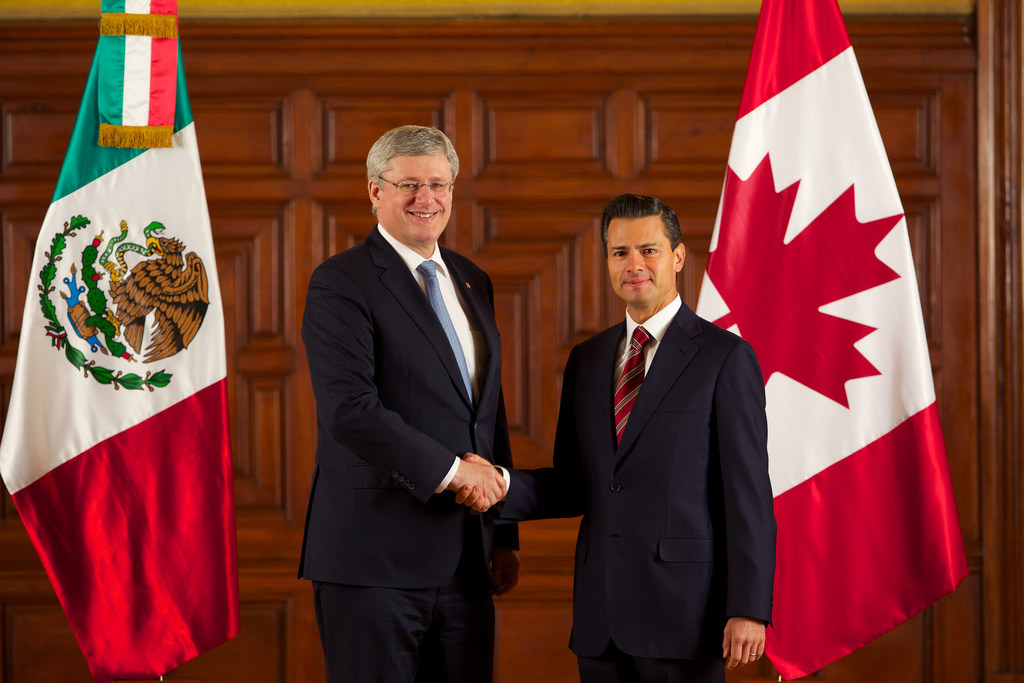
Prime Minister Stephen Harper and President Enrique Peña Nieto in Mexico City, February 2014.

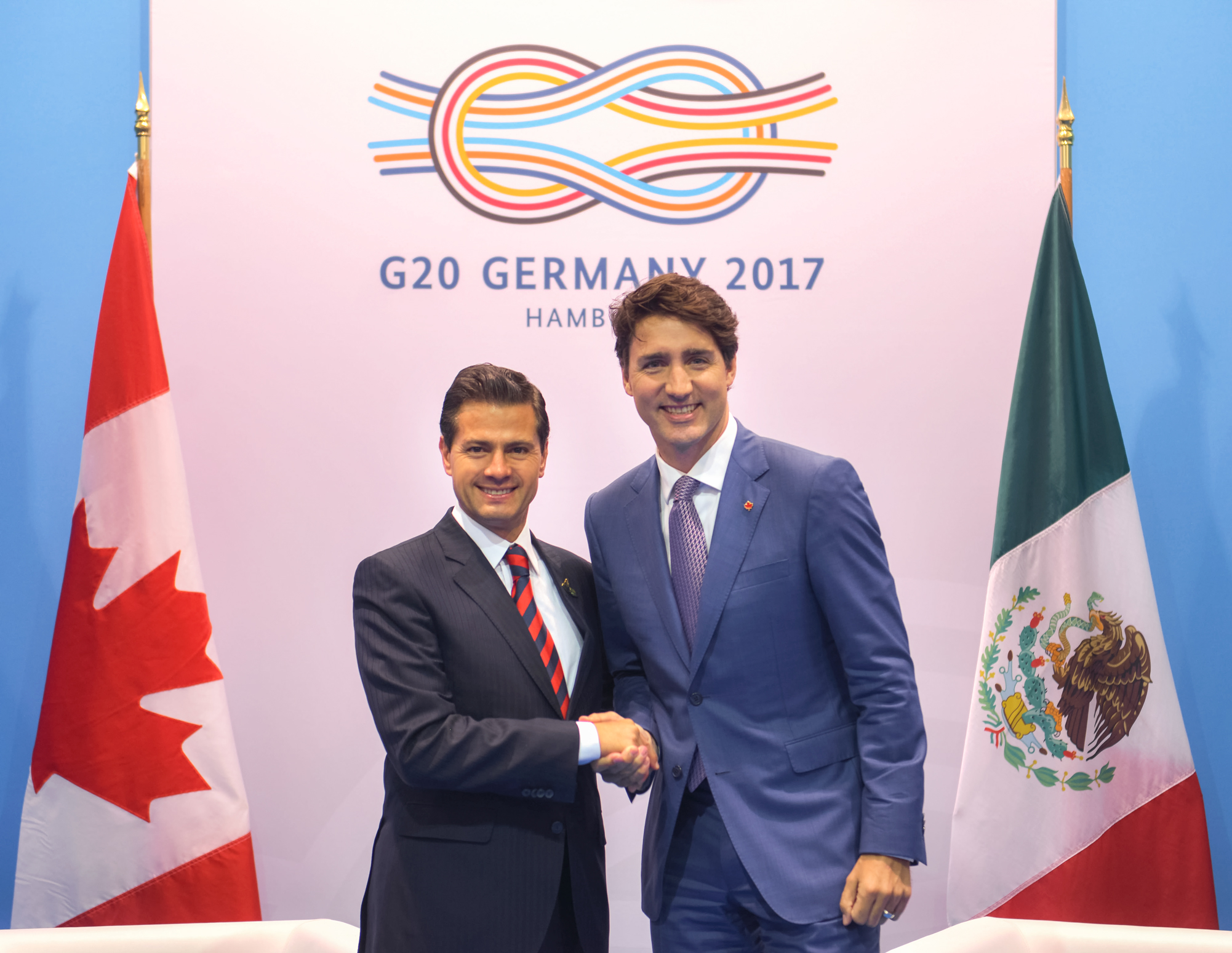
President Enrique Peña Nieto and Prime Minister Justin Trudeau at the 2017 G-20 Hamburg summit.

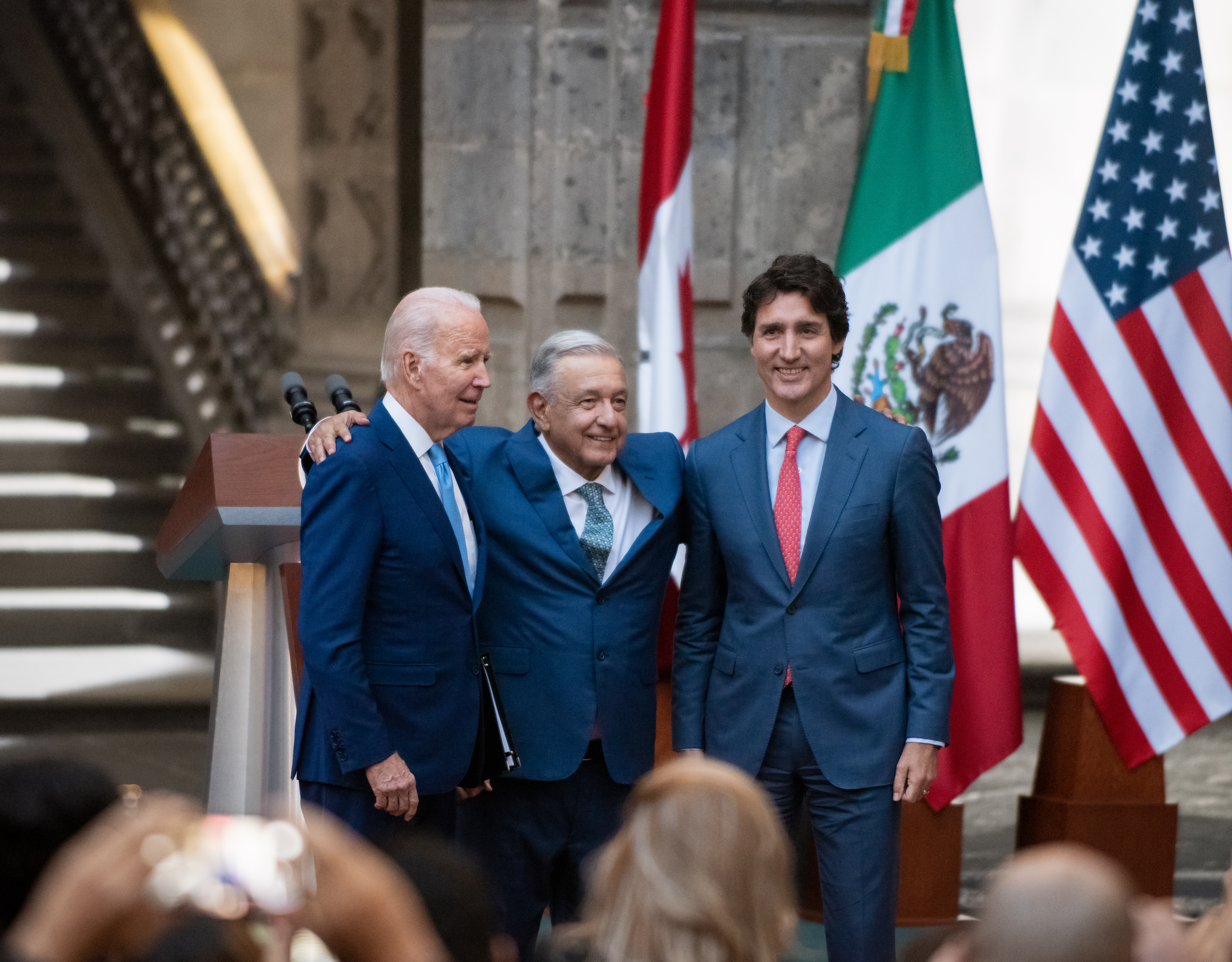
President Joe Biden, President Andrés Manuel López Obrador and Prime Minister Justin Trudeau in Mexico City; January 2023.

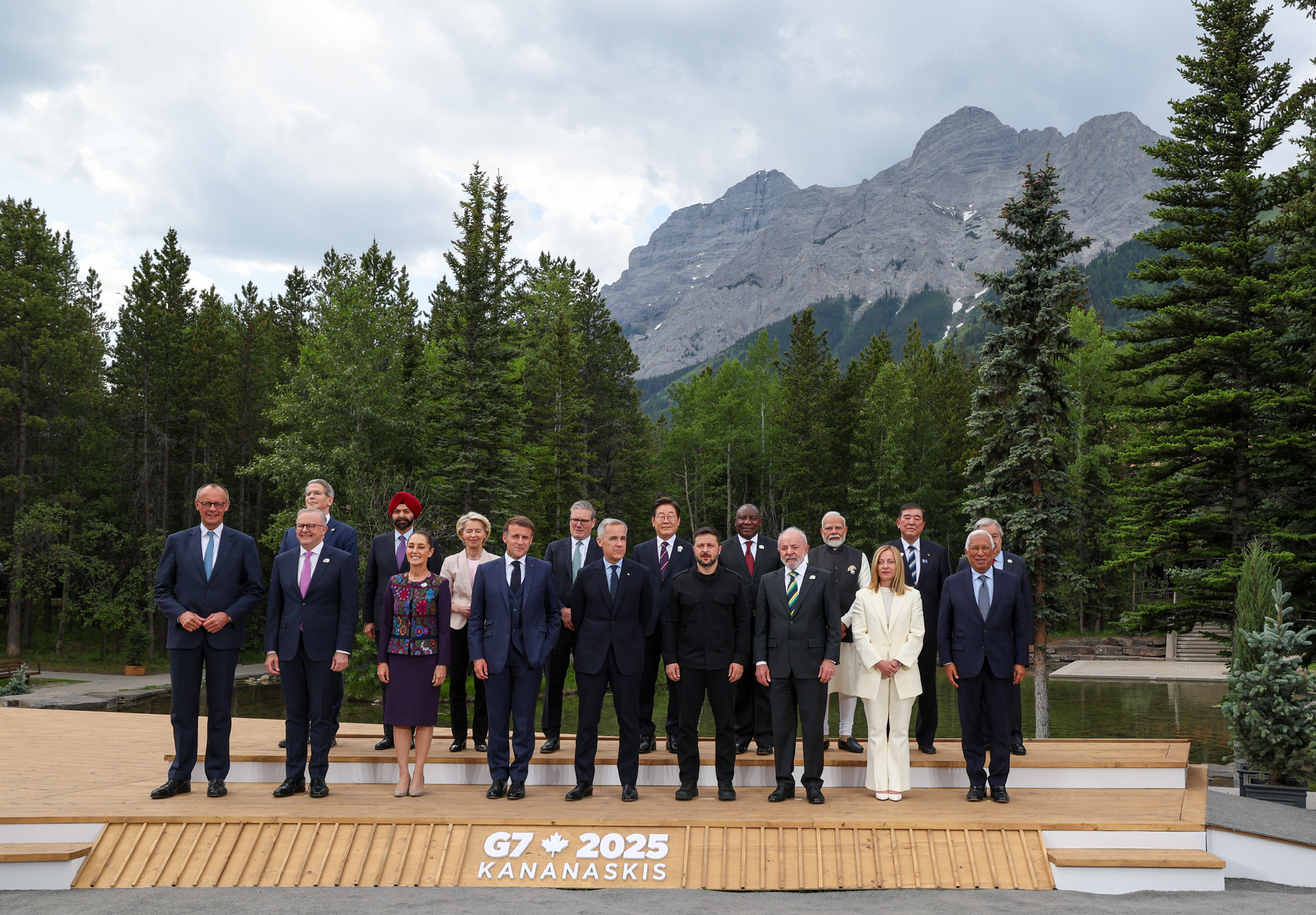
Prime Minister Mark Carney and President Claudia Sheinbaum attending the 51st G7 summit in Kananaskis, Alberta, Canada; June 2025.

== Bilateral agreements ==
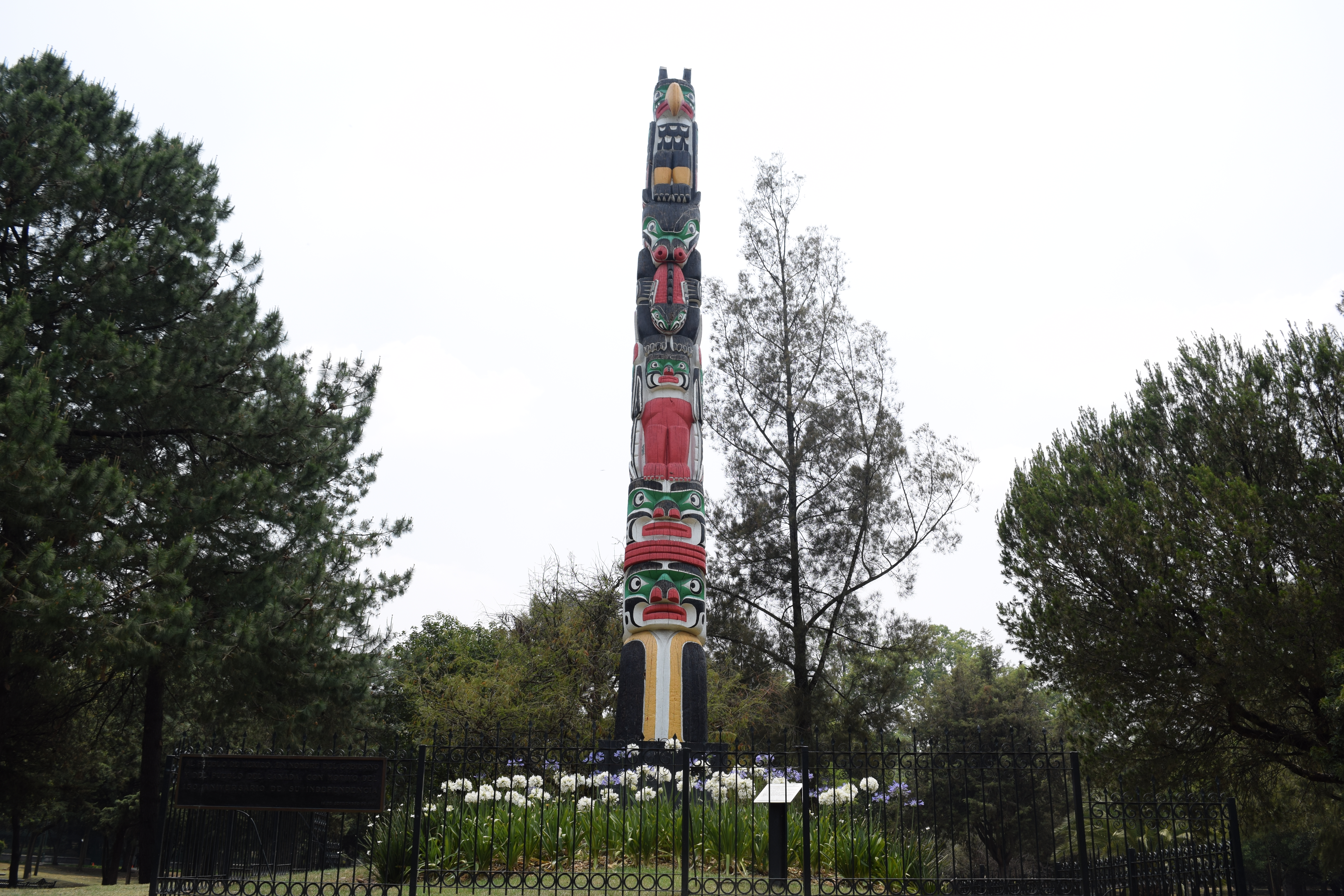
The tótem canadiense in Chapultepec Park by Mungo Martin. Gifted by the Canadian Government in 1960 in commemoration of the 150th anniversary of Mexican Independence.

Both nations have signed several bilateral agreements such as an Agreement on Postal Mail Exchange (1904); Agreement on Cultural Cooperation (1976); Treaty on the Execution of Criminal Judgments (1977); Agreement of Environmental Cooperation (1990); Agreement on Tourist Cooperation (1990); Agreement on Mutual Legal Assistance Cooperation in Criminal Matters (1990); Extradition Treaty (1990); Agreement on Mutual Assistance and Cooperation in Customs Administrations (1990); Agreement of Cinematographic and Audiovisual Co-production (1991); Agreement on Cooperation in the Areas of Museums and Archaeology (1991); Agreement for Cooperation in the Peaceful uses of Nuclear Energy (1994); Agreement on Social Security (1995); Agreement on Satellite Services (1999); Agreement on Competition Laws (2001); Agreement on the Avoidance of Double Taxation and Prevent Tax Evasion on Income (2006); and an Agreement on Air Transportation (2014).

== Trade ==
Twenty years after NAFTA, Mexico became the largest exporter and importer in Latin America. It exports more manufactured goods than all other Latin American countries combined. In 2023, two-way trade between both nations amounted to US$28.7 billion. Canada's main exports to Mexico include: seeds, aluminum alloys, wheat, vehicle and vehicle parts and accessories, diesel fuel and diesel oil and mixtures, and goods for the assembly or manufacture of aircraft and airplanes among others. Mexico's main exports to Canada include: vehicles (both passenger and transport), flat screen TVs, goods for the assembly or manufacture of aircraft and parts, piston engines parts, tractors, electronics for receiving, converting, and transmitting voice feedback, and avocados among others.

In 2022, Canadian companies invested US$33 billion in Mexico making Mexico Canada's 10th largest direct investment destination. Canadian multinational companies such as Bombardier Inc., BlackBerry, Canadian Pacific Kansa City (CPKC), Fairmont Hotels and Resorts and Scotiabank operate in Mexico. At the same time, Mexican multinational companies such as ALFA, Cemex and Grupo Bimbo operate in Canada. Various Mexican beer and tequila products are sold in Canada.

There have been concerns regarding human-rights and environmental violations in Mexico from Canadian Mining companies like Blackfire Exploration.

== Resident diplomatic missions ==
of Canada in Mexico

- Mexico City (Embassy)
- Monterrey (Consulate-General)
- Guadalajara (Consulate)
- Acapulco (Consular agency)
- Cabo San Lucas (Consular agency)
- Cancún (Consular agency)
- Mazatlán (Consular agency)
- Playa del Carmen (Consular agency)
- Puerto Vallarta (Consular agency)

of Mexico in Canada

- Ottawa (Embassy)
- Montreal (Consulate-General)
- Toronto (Consulate-General)
- Vancouver (Consulate-General)
- Calgary (Consulate)
- Leamington (Consulate)

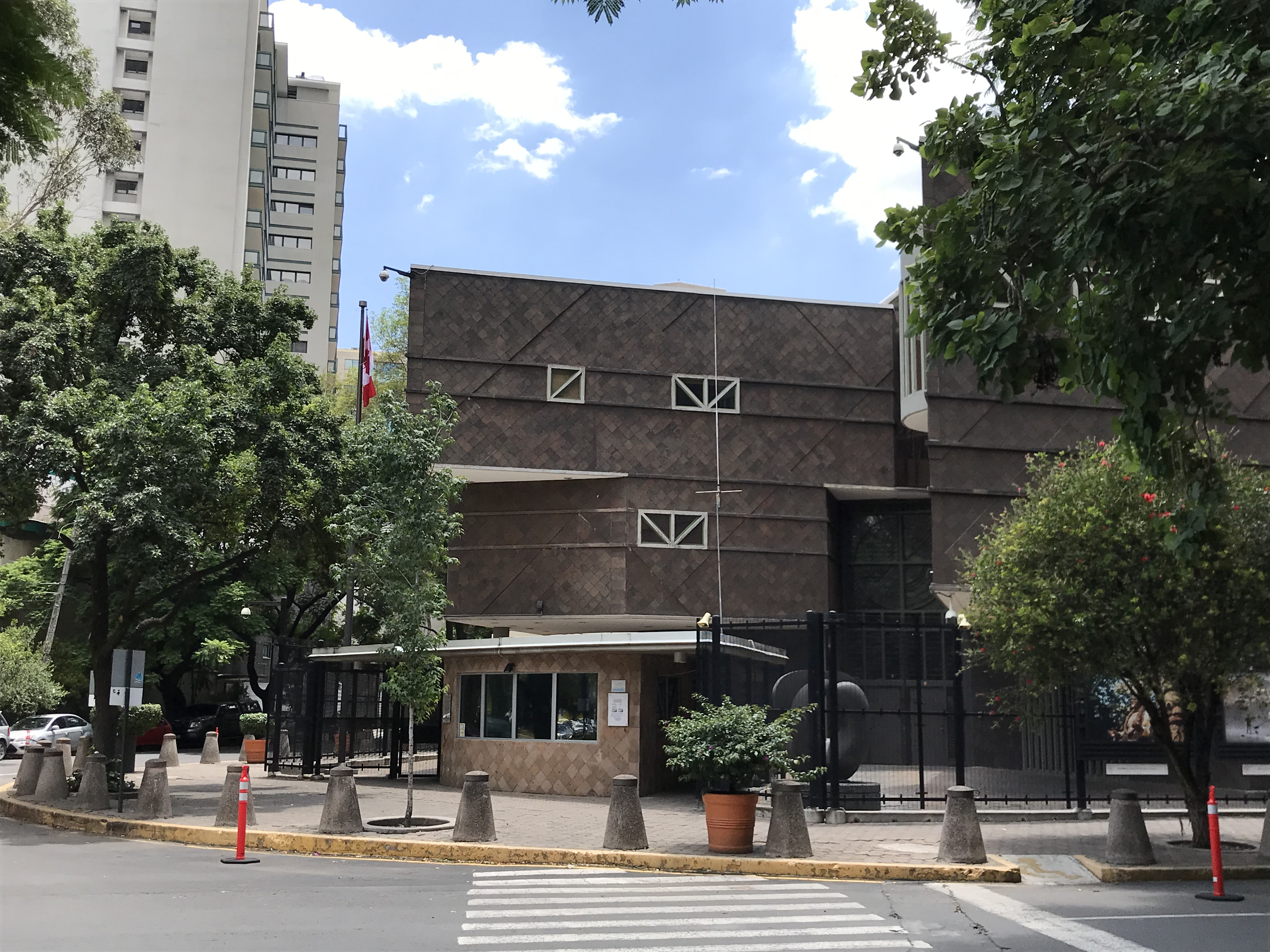
Embassy of Canada in Mexico City
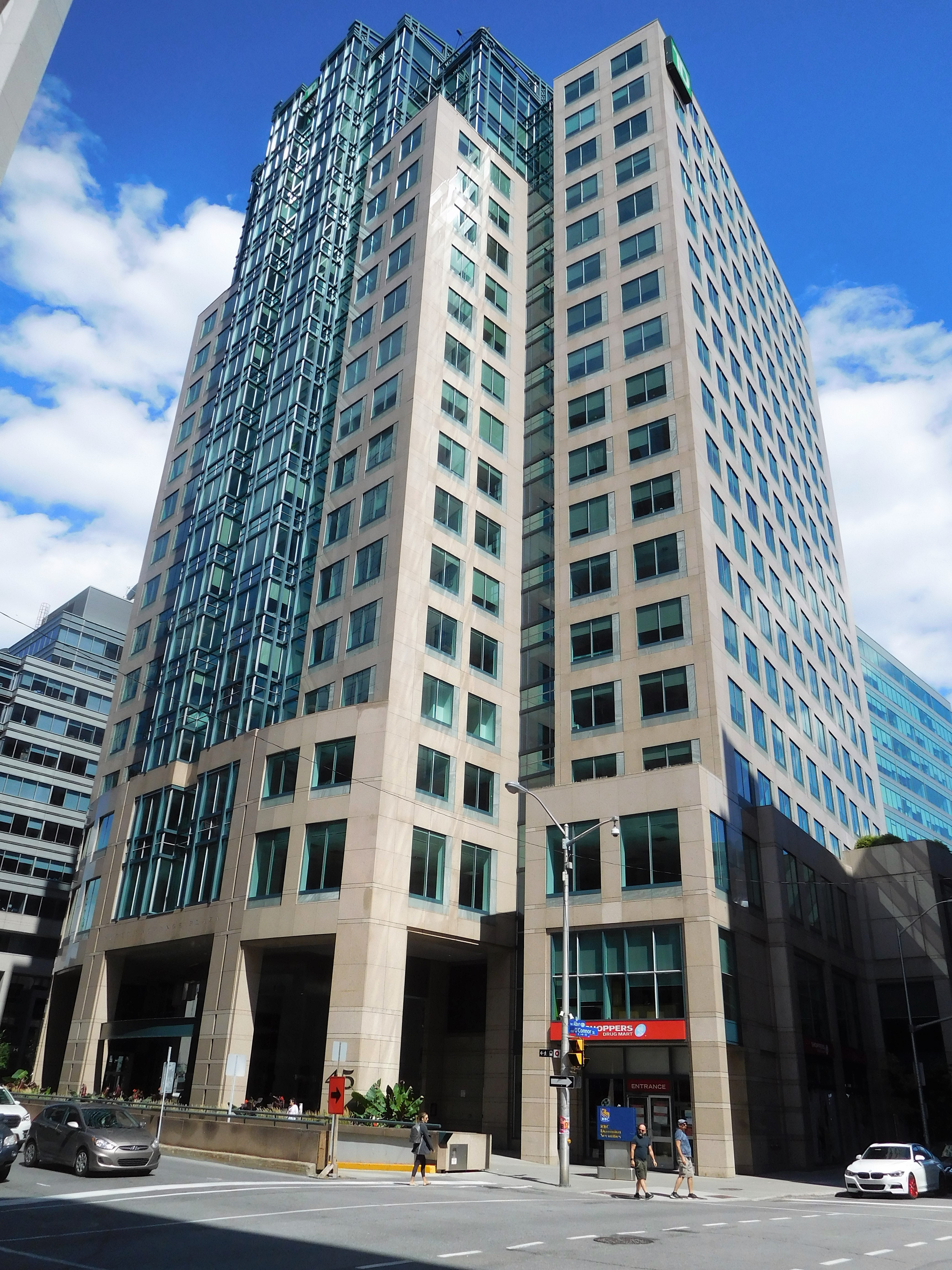
Building hosting the Embassy of Mexico in Ottawa

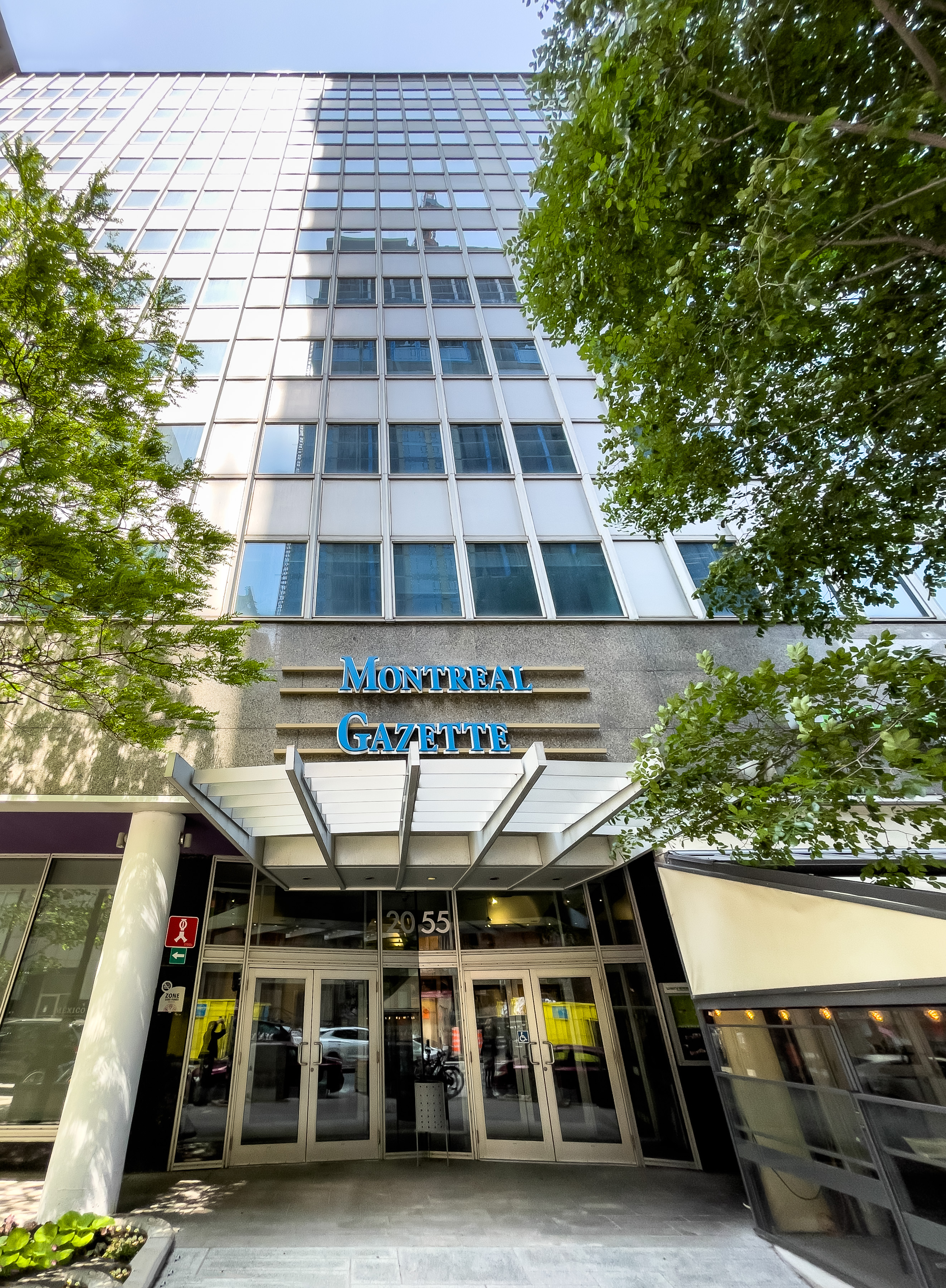
Building hosting the Consulate-General of Mexico in Montreal

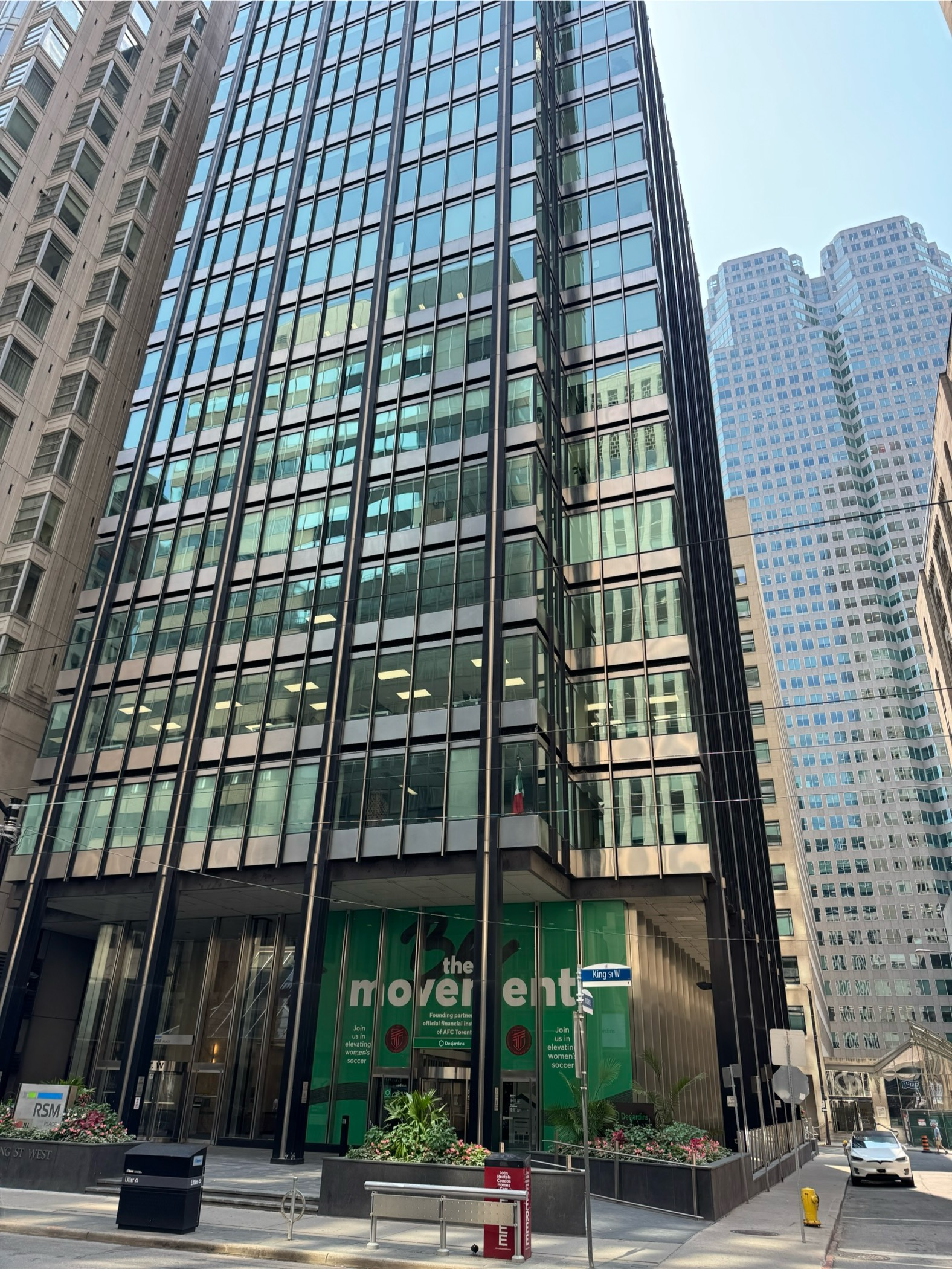
Building hosting the Consulate-General of Mexico in Toronto

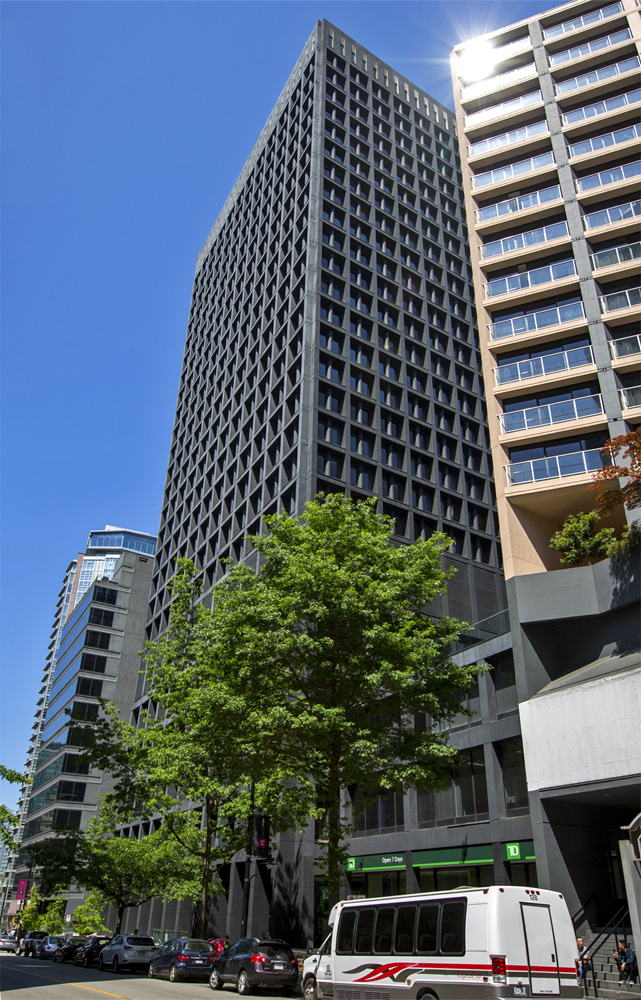
Building hosting the Consulate-General of Mexico in Vancouver

Building hosting the Consulate of Mexico in Calgary

== Gallery ==
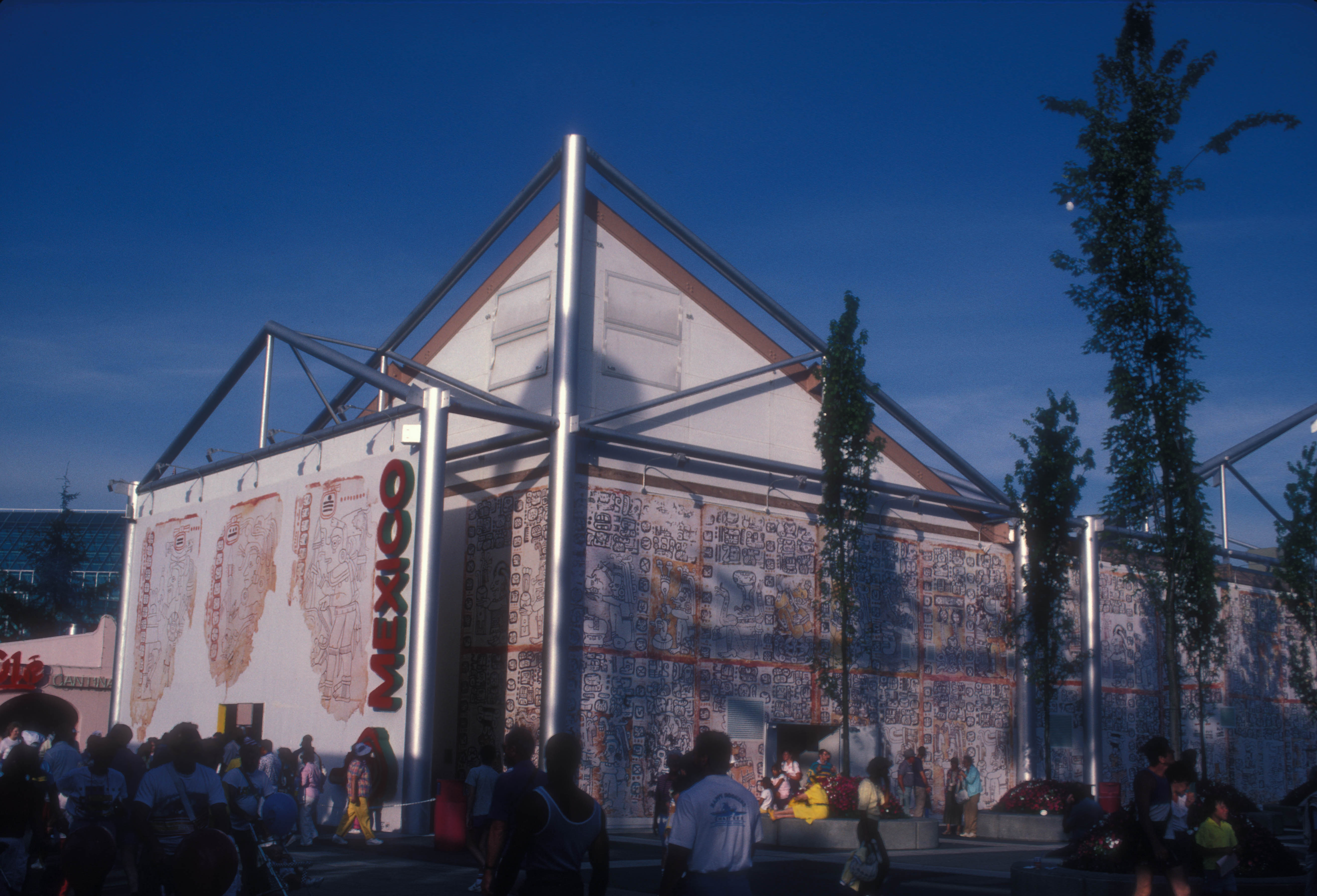
Pavillion of Mexico at Expo 86 in Vancouver

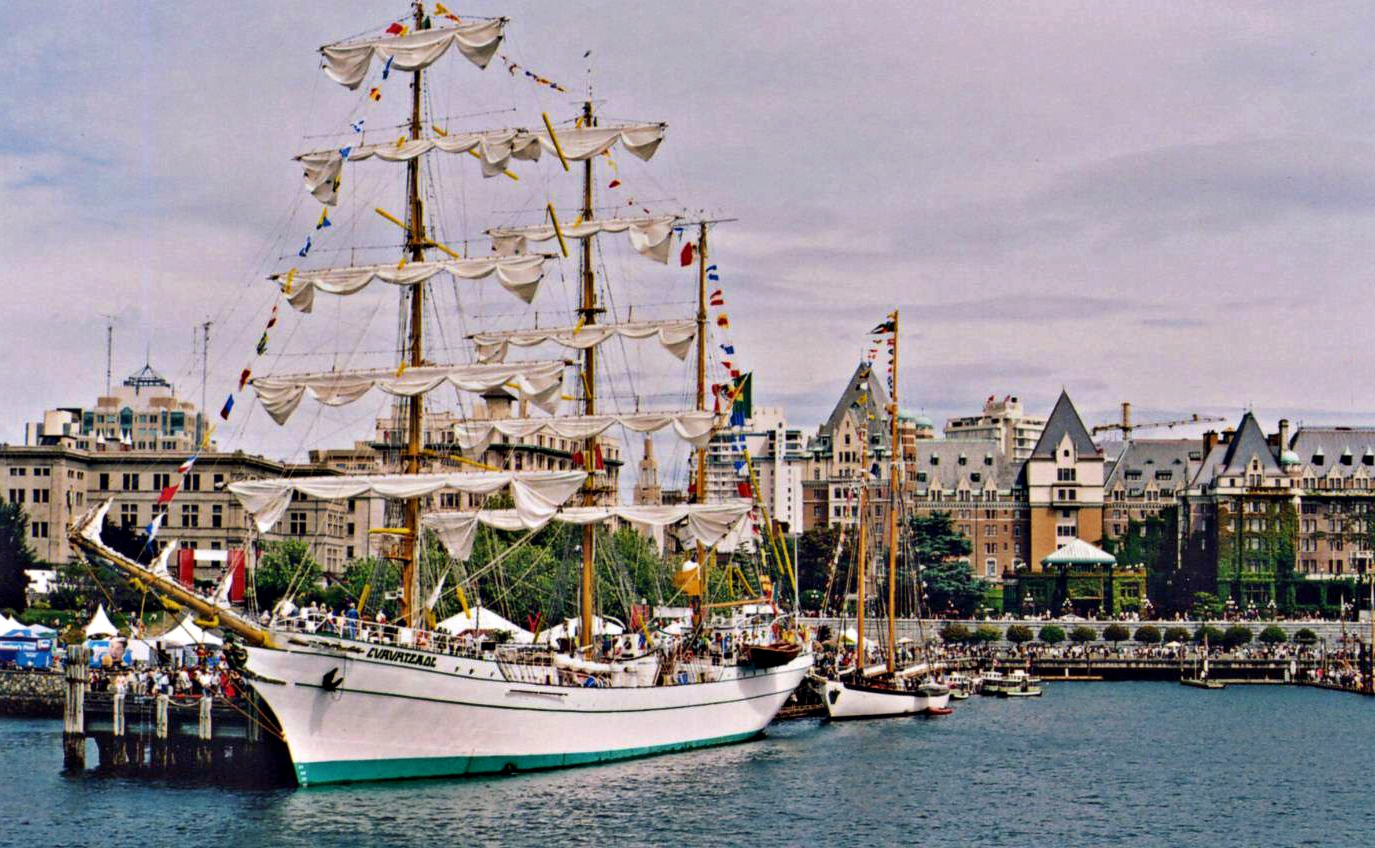
Mexican Navy training ship, the ARM Cuauhtémoc, in Victoria

Military ships from Canada, Mexico and the United States at the Panama Canal

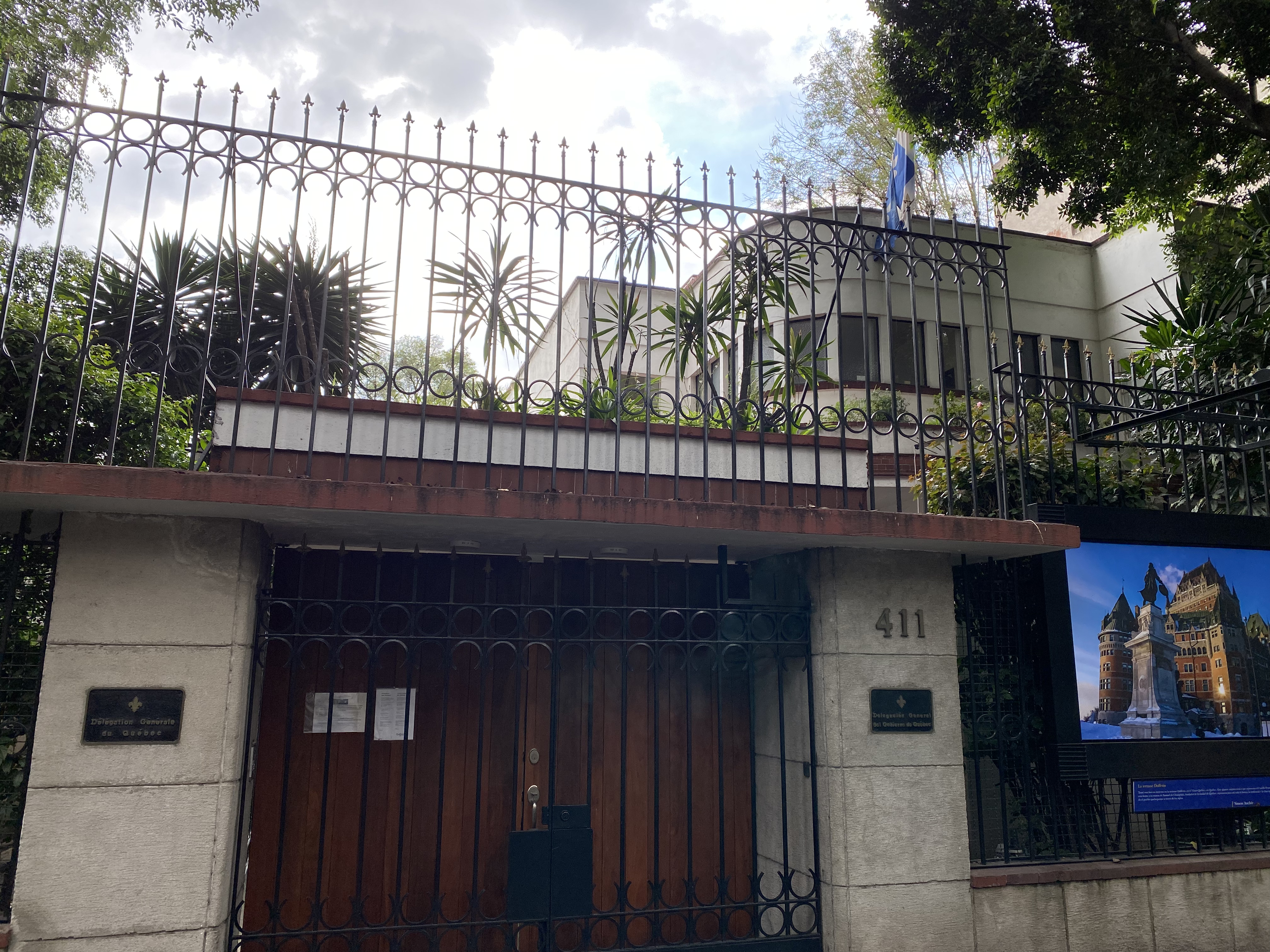
General Delegation of the Government of Quebec in Mexico City

Honorary Consulate of Canada in Tijuana

Flags of Canada and Mexico in the Canadian Parliament

Flags of Mexico and Canada at the National Palace in Mexico City

== See also ==
- Canada–Latin America relations
- Canadian Mexicans
- Mexican Canadians
- North American Leaders' Summit
- Seasonal Agricultural Workers Program
