= Canadian totem =

Monument in Mexico City

Coordinates: 19°25′06″N 99°11′22″W

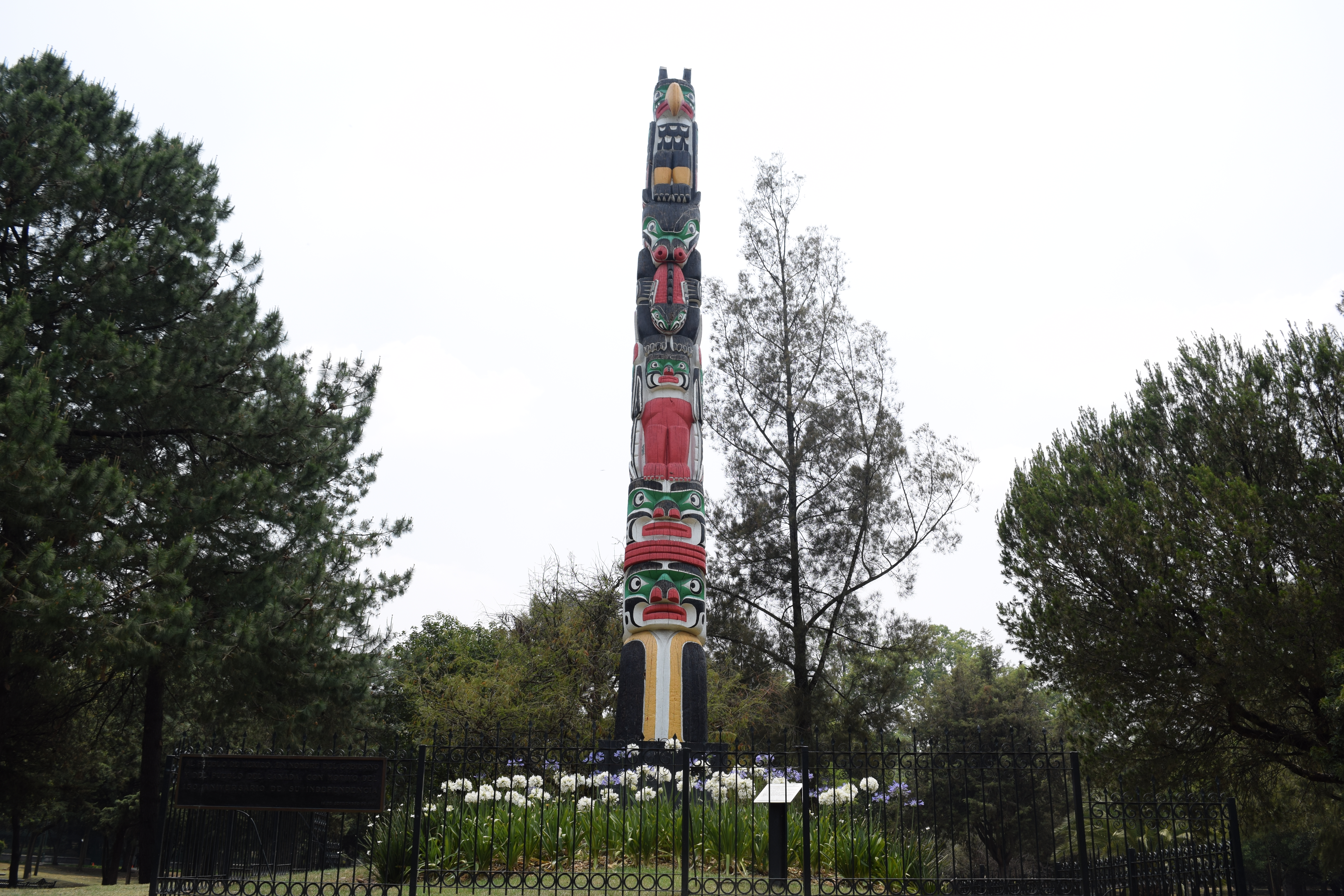
- The totem pole in 2017
- Artist: Mungo Martin
- Year: 1962
- Medium: red cedar
- Location: Mexico City, Mexico

The Canadian totem (Spanish: Tótem canadiense) is a totem pole in Chapultepec in Mexico City. Designed by Kwakwakaʼwakw carver Mungo Martin, it was given to Mexico by the Canadian government in the 1960s to celebrate the 150th year of Mexican independence. The pole depicts four figures: a Thunderbird, a sea otter, Sisiutl, and Cedar Man. One of the last projects Martin worked on before his death in 1962, the totem pole was carved by Tony Hunt, Henry Hunt, and Eugene Hunt.

The totem pole underwent restoration in 2014 to mark the 70th anniversary of Canada–Mexico relations.

== Description and location ==
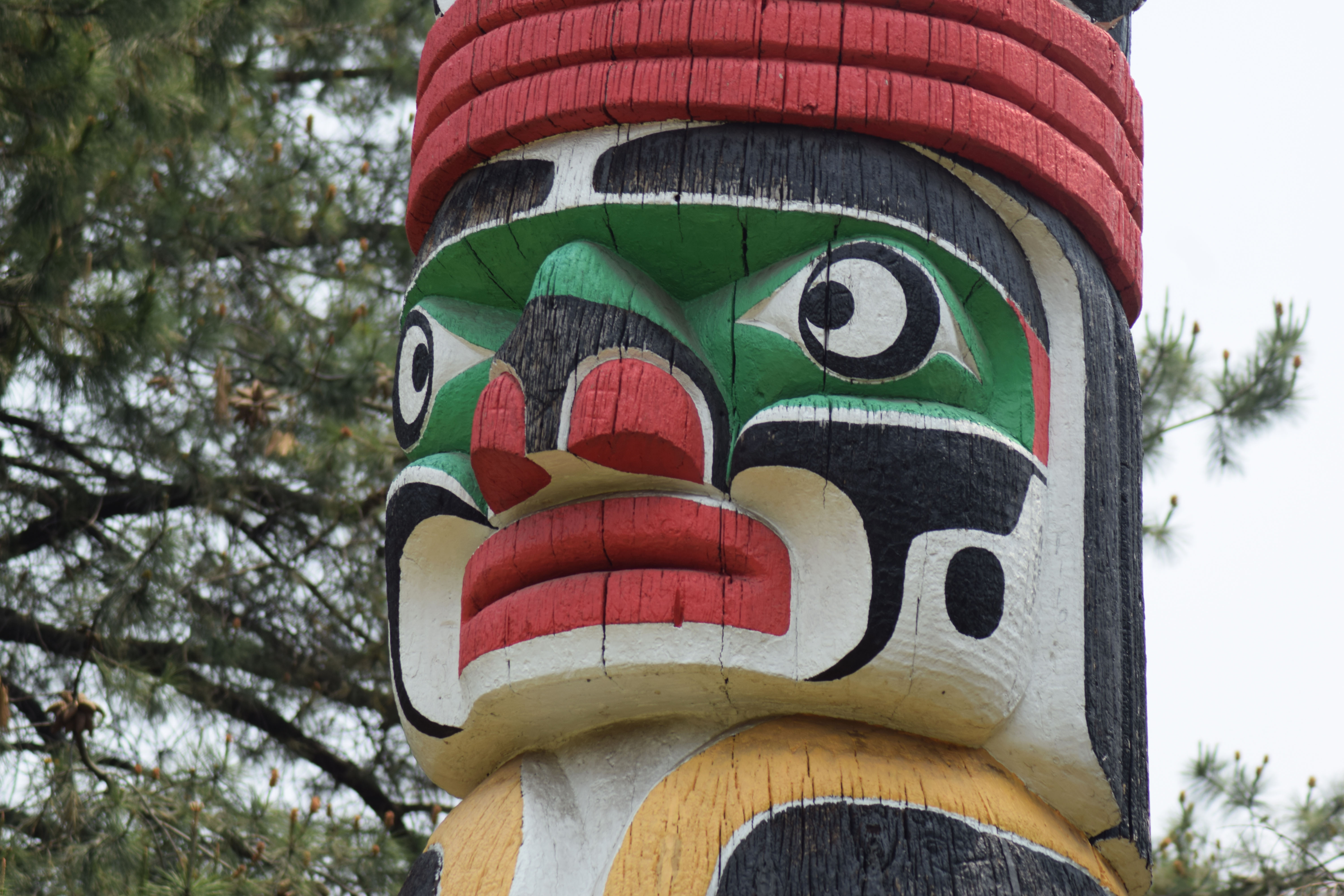
Face of the Cedar Man

Brightly coloured, the totem pole is made from red cedar and stands 11 metres (37 ft) tall. It is located in the first section of Chapultepec, a city park in Mexico City, by the Calzada del Rey and behind the Quebradora gate (Spanish: puerta Quebradora).

The totem pole depicts, from top to bottom, a Thunderbird, a sea otter, the double-headed serpent Sisiutl, and Cedar Man. (Note: The Cedar Man, who is also depicted on Martin's memorial totem pole, has been described by Richard Hunt as "the spirit of the cedar tree personified".) The presence of the sea otter was to represent the connections between Mexico and British Columbia that were formed when the Spanish were exploring the Northwest Coast. According to the Canadian ambassador in 2014, the black, green, red, white, and yellow colours featured on the pole were traditional in Kwakwakaʼwakw art. In 2014, after the pole was repaired, the conservator announced that he planned to re-install it facing east, "in a kind of new start in its story". (Note: Spanish: "en una especie de nuevo inicio en su historia")

== History ==
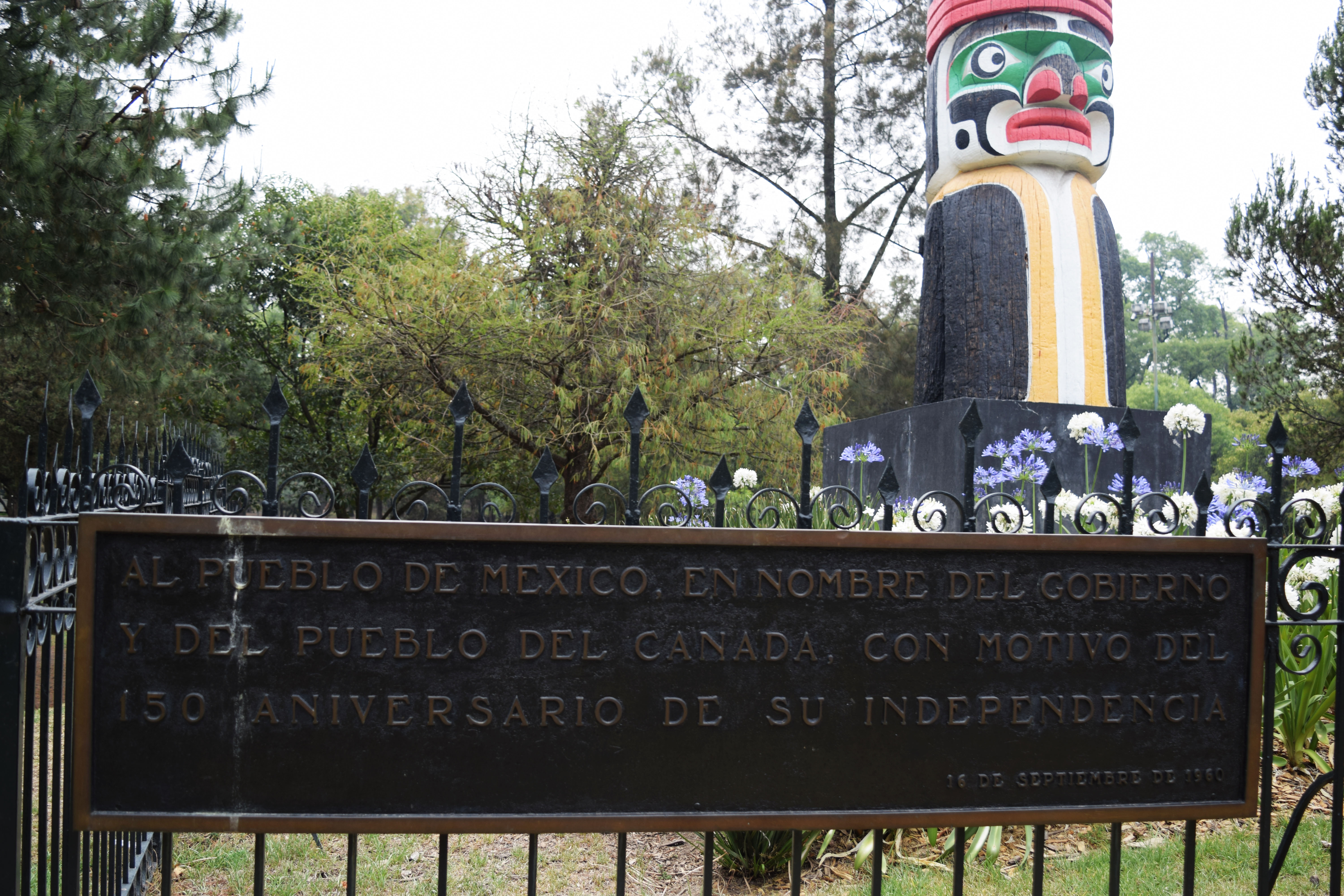
Plaque near the base of the pole explaining its history

The totem pole was commissioned by Howard Charles Green, the secretary of state for external affairs, on behalf of the Canadian federal government as a gift to Mexico in honour of the country's 150th anniversary of independence. In charge of design was Kwakwakaʼwakw carver Mungo Martin; the pole was carved in 1961 at Thunderbird Park with assistance from Tony Hunt Sr., Henry Hunt, and Eugene Hunt. Tony Hunt later disputed the involvement of the other men, maintaining that, though the pole was designed by his grandfather, Martin, Tony Hunt had been the sole carver on the project. It was one of the last major projects Martin worked on before his death in 1962.

Upon completion, the totem pole was taken from British Columbia to Acapulco by ship, then taken by road to the Chapultepec city park. It was officially presented to Mexico by Canadian ambassador William Arthur Irwin on 18 October 1962, two months after Martin's death. Irwin spoke at the ceremony, discussing the connections between indigenous Mexican and Canadian art. He stated that though "Canadian Indigenous art never reached the heights of craftsmanship and aesthetic excellence achieved by the pre-Hispanic civilizations of Mexico", he found "there were certain affinities between the two cultures". Hundreds of people attended the ceremony in Chapultepec, Canadian and Mexican alike, as well as officials such as Indian diplomat P.L. Bhandari, British ambassador Peter Garran, and José Gorostiza. A mariachi band played the Canadian and Mexican national anthems.

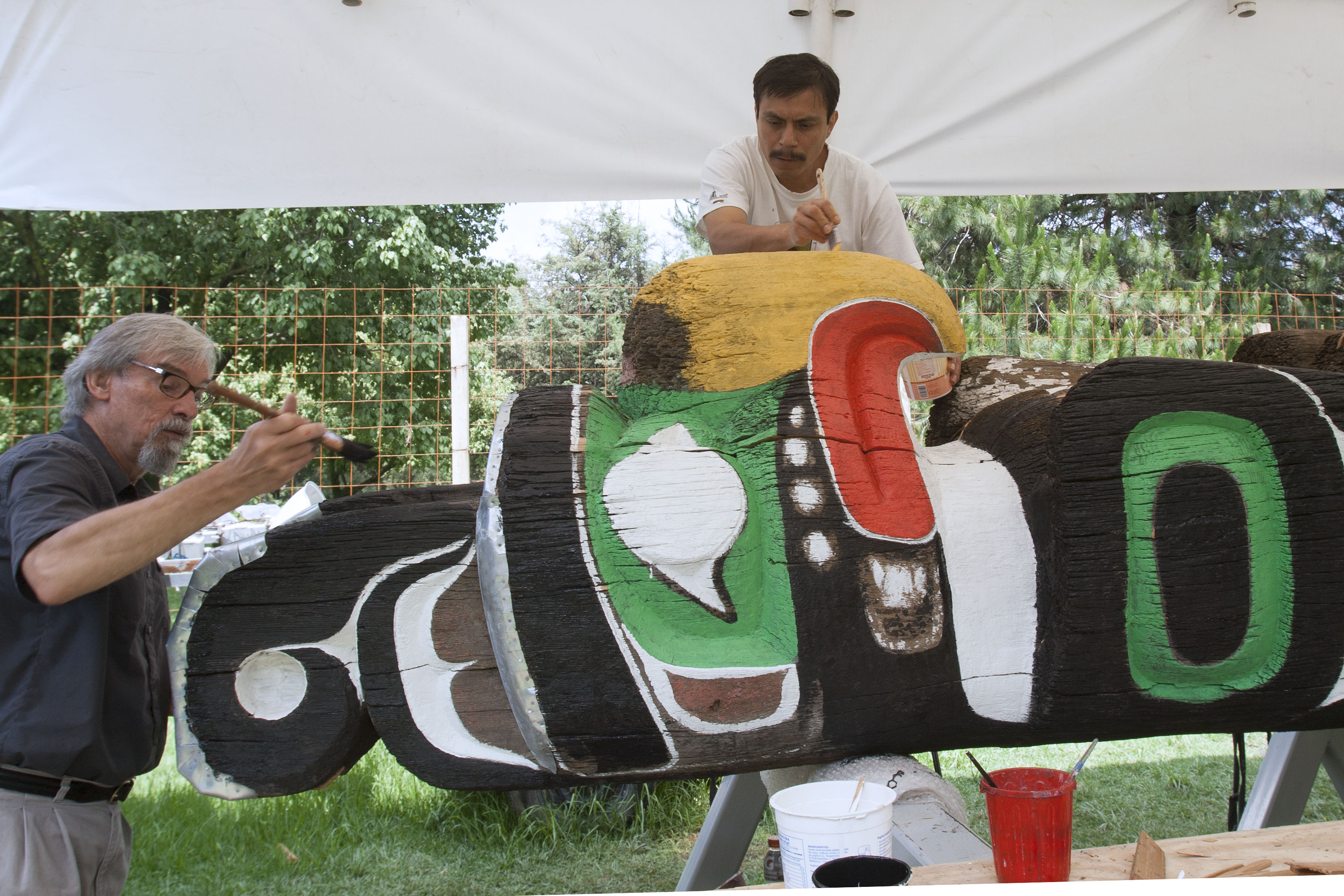
The Thunderbird being restored

In the 21st century, a Canadian resident married to a Mexican woman noticed that the totem pole had begun to deteriorate and contacted the Canadian government. The totem pole was assessed in November 2013 and taken down the following May for six weeks of repairs. It was cleaned, capped, treated for pests, and repainted; the area around the pole underwent additional renovations. The repairs, done to mark the 70th anniversary of Canadian–Mexican relations, were led by the Canadian Embassy in Mexico City in collaboration with the Mexican government. The project was funded by the Canadian Chamber of Commerce in Mexico and Canadian companies and cost over 748,000 pesos. The pole was restored by a Mexican restorer and a Canadian conservator who had repaired other totem poles. They were assisted by two Kwakwaka’wakw carvers.

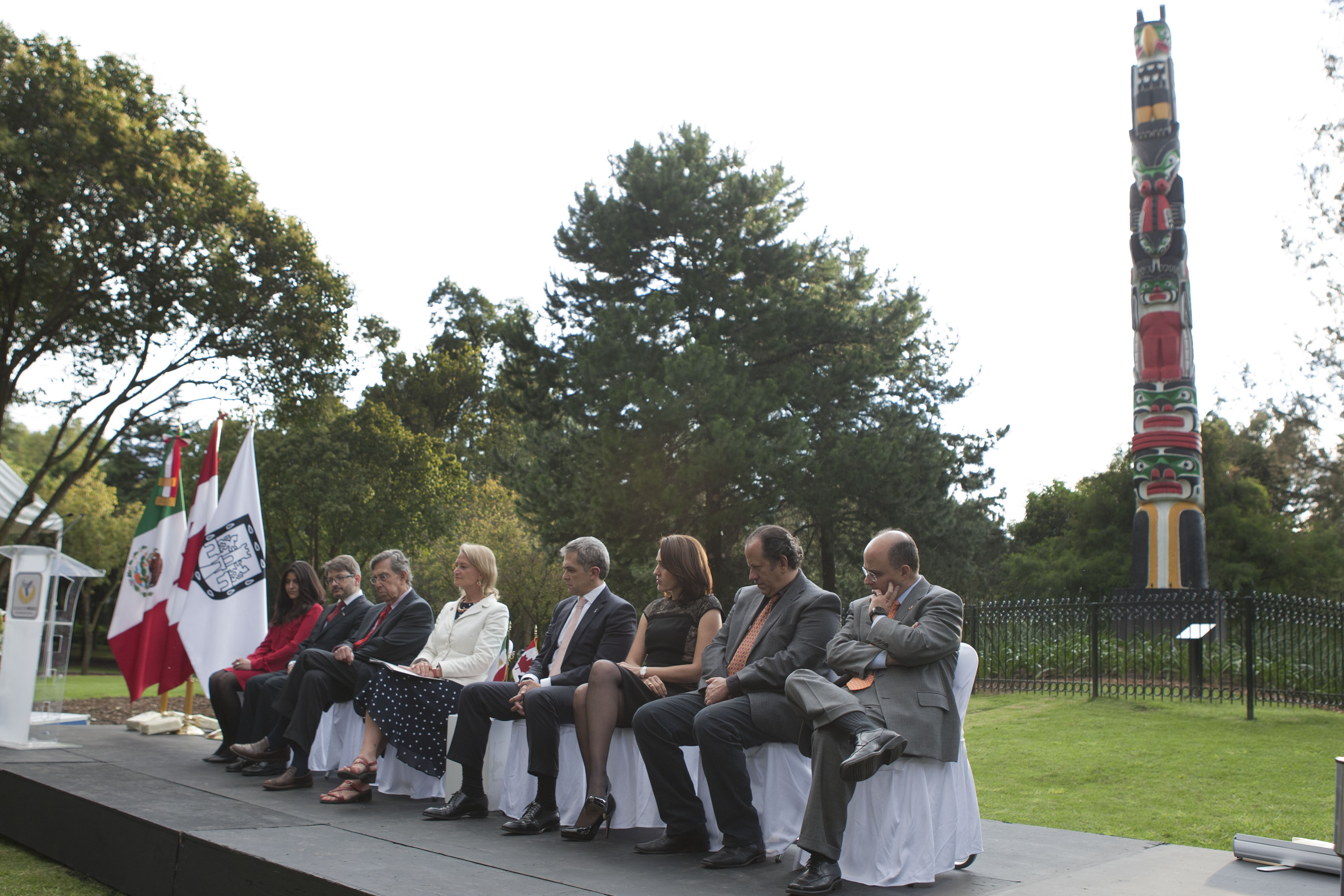
2014 rededication ceremony

Tony Hunt, who was only invited to consult and not to contribute to the restoration efforts, criticized the repairs. He felt that his lack of involvement, without the tools Martin had made, was insulting to both him and Martin, and described the decision as akin to "sending a carpenter to repaint the Mona Lisa".

The rededication ceremony was held on 23 October 2014, led by the head of government of Mexico City, Miguel Ángel Mancera. He spoke about Canada–Mexico relations alongside Canadian diplomat Sara Hradecky and Mexico City's environment secretary, Tanya Müller.

== Gallery ==
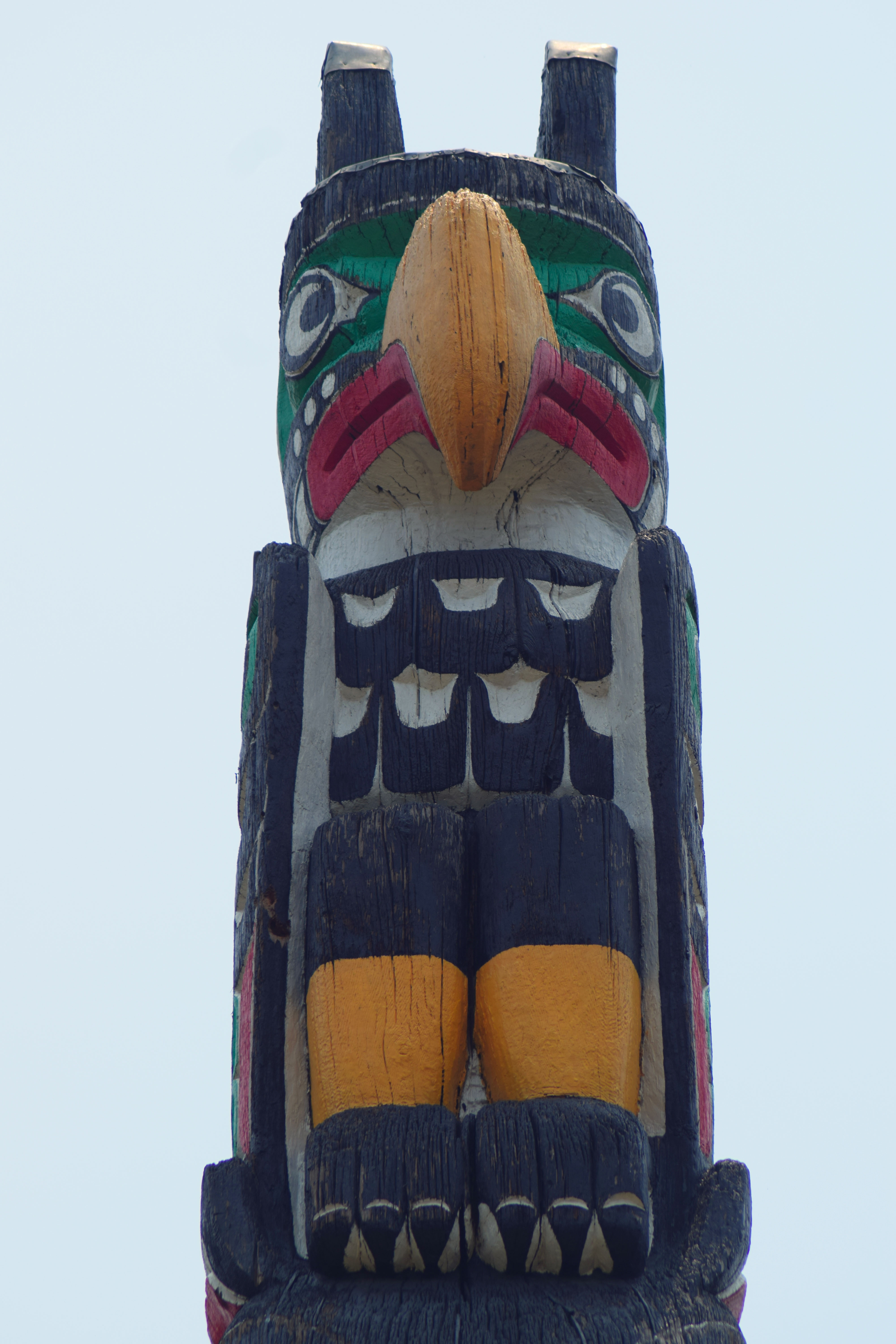
The Thunderbird on top of the pole

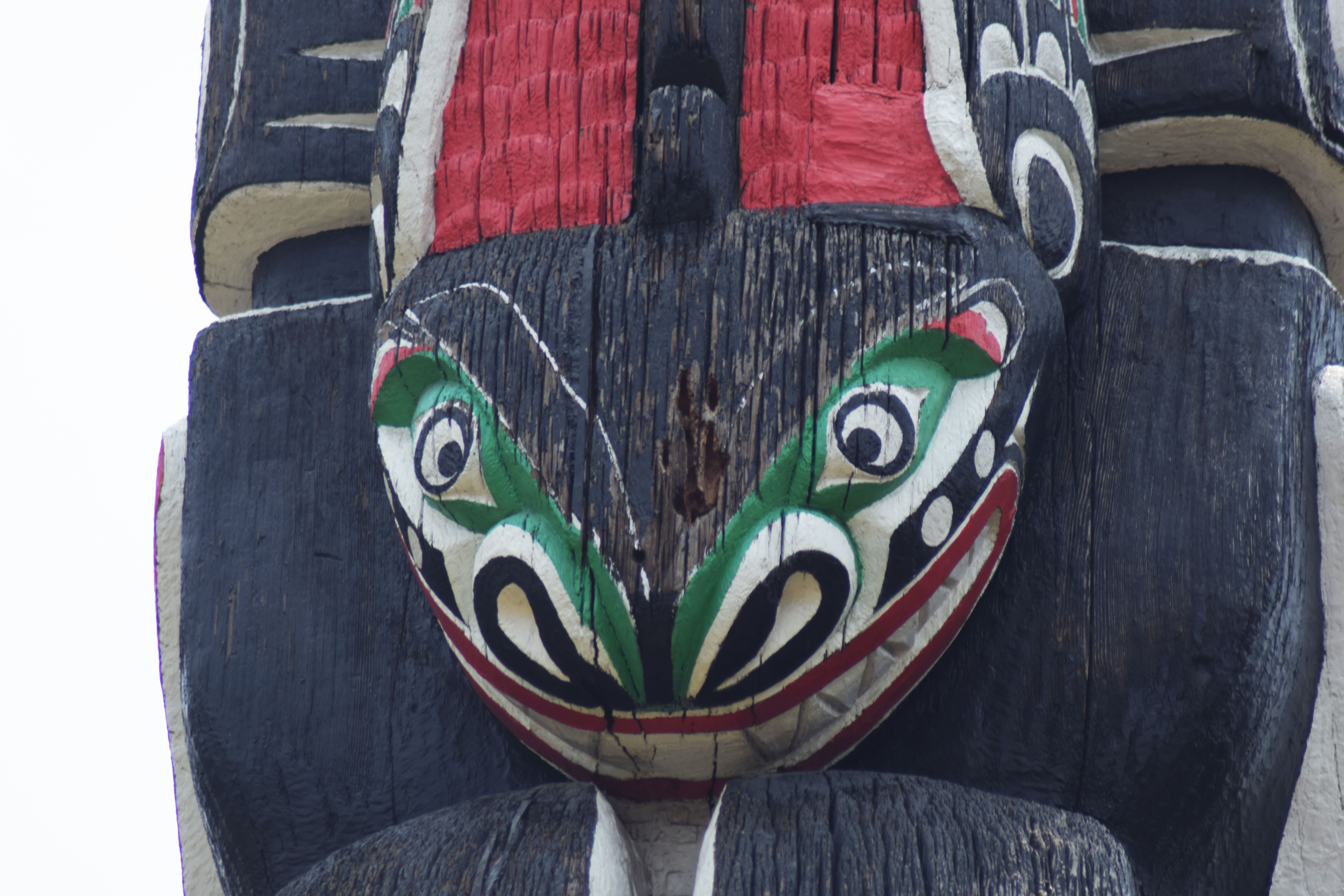
Detail of the totem pole, below the Sea Otter

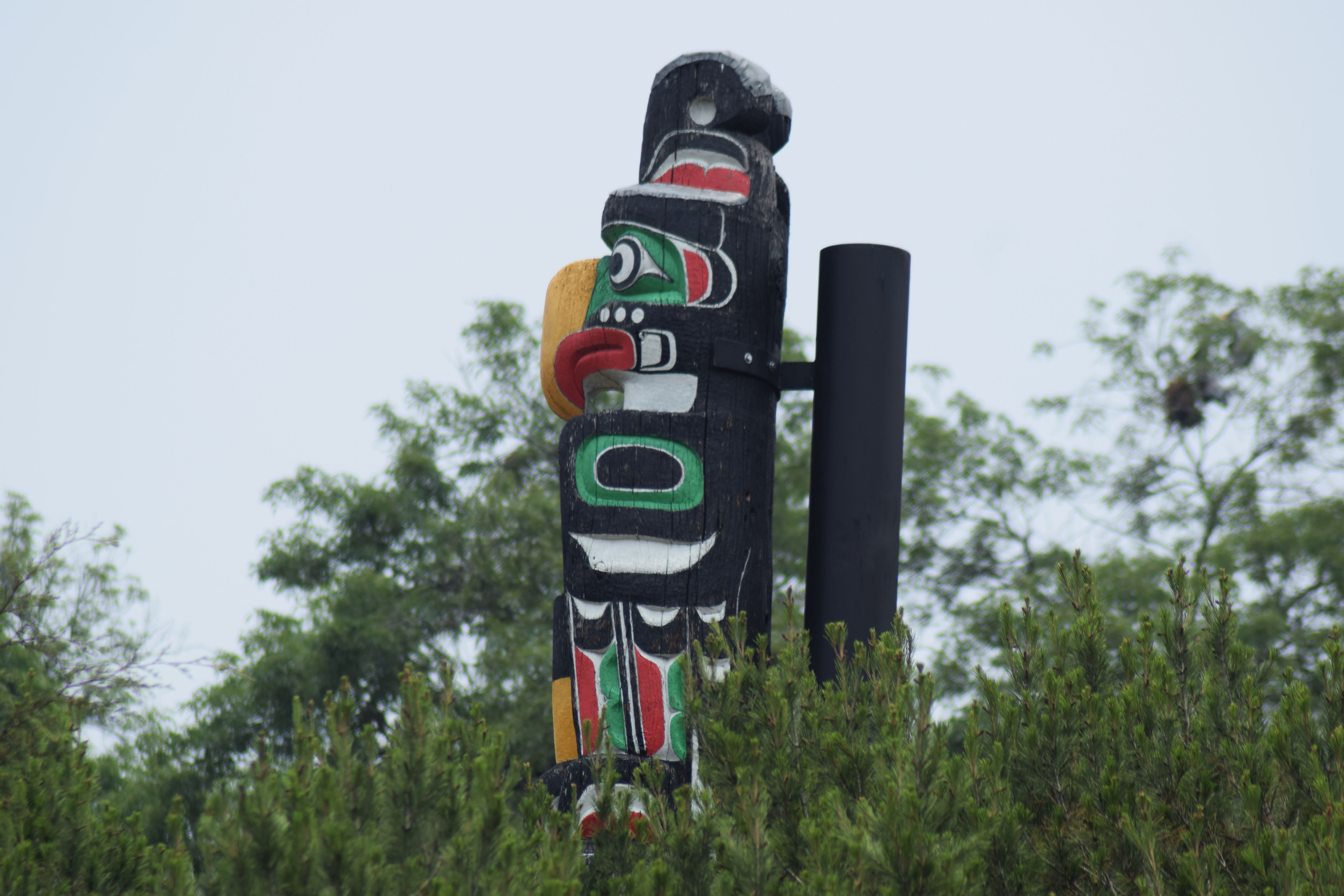
Side view of the Thunderbird

== See also ==
- List of totem poles
