= Arturo Hernández Basave =

Arturo Hernández Basave is a Mexican diplomat. He has served as the ambassador of Mexico to Pakistan until November 2009, when Mexico closed its embassy in Islamabad two years after its inauguration due to financial reasons. He was subsequently appointed as the Deputy Permanent Representative of Mexico to the United Nations in Geneva. Beginning his career in 1993, Basave has also previously served as the deputy chief of mission in Chile and the Netherlands, and worked at the Mexican embassy in Greece. In Mexico, he was a member of the Directorates for Latin America and the Caribbean, the United Nations and several other regional organisations. He has a law degree from the National Autonomous University of Mexico.
