= List of ambassadors and high commissioners of Canada =

This is a list of Canadian ambassadors and high commissioners to other countries and international organizations, including permanent representatives of ambassadorial rank from Canada.

In cases where a diplomat is accredited to more than one nation, the first country listed is the location of the Ambassador's or High Commissioner's residence, followed by other countries of accreditation, in alphabetical order.

Canada sends high commissioners to Commonwealth countries, and ambassadors to non-Commonwealth countries.

== International organizations ==
Host organisation	Office location	Current	Previous
International Civil Aviation Organization	Montreal	Karine Asselin	
Ismaili Imamat		David Lametti	
North Atlantic Treaty Organization	Brussels	Heidi Hulan	See list
Organization of American States	Washington	André François Giroux	See list
Organisation for Economic Co-operation and Development	Paris	Jean-François Tremblay	
Organisation for the Prohibition of Chemical Weapons	The Hague	Hugh Adsett	
Organization for Security and Co-operation in Europe	Vienna	Véronique Pepin-Hallé	See list
United Nations
Headquarters	New York City	David Lametti; Michael Gort	See list
Office at Geneva	Geneva	Peter MacDougall	
Conference on Disarmament	Geneva	Peter MacDougall	
International Atomic Energy Agency	Vienna	Alison Grant	
Office on Drugs and Crime	Vienna	Alison Grant	
Comprehensive Nuclear-Test-Ban Treaty Organization	Vienna	Alison Grant	
Environment Programme	Nairobi	Joshua Tabah	
Human Settlements Programme	Nairobi	Joshua Tabah	
World Food Programme	Rome	Elissa Golberg	
Food and Agriculture Organization	Rome	Elissa Golberg	
International Fund for Agricultural Development	Rome	Elissa Golberg	
UNESCO	Paris	Noémie Dansereau-Lavoie	
World Trade Organization	Geneva	Michelle Cooper	
World Intellectual Property Organization	Geneva	Michelle Cooper	
Conference on Trade and Development	Geneva	Michelle Cooper	

== Political unions ==
Host	Office location	Current	Previous
African Union	Addis Ababa	Annika Allman	
Association of Southeast Asian Nations	Jakarta	Ambra Dickie	
Caribbean Community	Georgetown	Deborah Gomes-Schultz	
European Union	Brussels	Jonathan Wilkinson; John Hannaford	See list

== Countries ==
Host	Office location	Current	Previous
Afghanistan (suspended)	Kabul	Vacant	See list
Algeria	Algiers	Robin Wettlaufer	See list
Argentina providing service to: Paraguay	Buenos Aires	Stewart Wheeler	See list
Armenia	Yerevan	Julie Crowley	See list
Australia † co-accredited to: Federated States of Micronesia; Marshall Islands; Nauru; Palau; Papua New Guinea; Solomon Islands; Vanuatu	Canberra	Julie Sunday	See list
Austria	Vienna	Alison Grant	See list
Bangladesh †	Dhaka	Ajit Singh	See list
Barbados † co-accredited to: Antigua and Barbuda; Dominica; Grenada; Saint Kitts and Nevis	Bridgetown	Brenda Wills	See list
Belgium co-accredited to: Luxembourg	Brussels	Joël Dupuis	See list
Benin	Cotonou	Evelyne Dabiré	
Brazil	Brasilia	Eric Walsh	See list
Brunei	Bandar Seri Begawan	Tamer Mansy	See list
Burkina Faso	Ouagadougou	Richard Le Bars	See list
Cambodia	Phnom Penh	Christian DesRoches	
Cameroon †; Co-accredited to: Central African Republic; Chad; Gabon	Yaoundé	Marie-Claude Harvey	See list
Chile	Santiago	Karolina Guay	See list
China	Beijing	Jennifer May	See list
Colombia	Bogotá	Elizabeth Williams	See list
Cuba	Havana	Carmen Sorger	See list
Costa Rica; Co-accredited to: Honduras; Nicaragua	San José	Ioanna Sahas Martin	See list
Croatia; Co-accredited to: Kosovo; Nicaragua	Zagreb	Jessica Blitt	See list
Czech Republic	Prague	Emily McLaughlin	See list
Democratic Republic of Congo; Co-accredited to: Republic of Congo	Kinshasa	Joanne Minns	
Denmark	Copenhagen	Carolyn Bennett	See list
Dominican Republic	Santo Domingo	Brendan Sutton	See list
Ecuador	Quito	Mazen Mahfouz	See list
Egypt	Cairo	Ulric Shannon	See list
El Salvador	San Salvador	Mylène Paradis	See list
Estonia	Tallinn	Laird Hindle	
Ethiopia; Co-accredited to: Djibouti; Eritrea	Addis Ababa	Nicolas Simard	See list
Fiji †	Suva	Jennifer Lalonde	
Finland	Helsinki	Patrick Hébert	See list
France; Co-accredited to: Monaco; Eritrea	Paris	Nathalie Drouin	See list
Germany	Berlin	Vera Alexander	See list
Ghana †; Co-accredited to: Sierra Leone; Togo	Accra	Myriam Montrat	See list
Greece; Co-accredited to: Cyprus	Athens	Sonya Thissen	See list
Guatemala; Co-accredited to: Belize	Guatemala City	Olivier Jacques	See list
Guyana †; Co-accredited to: Suriname	Georgetown	Deborah Gomes-Schultz	See list
Haiti	Port-au-Prince	Alexandre Côté	
Holy See	Vatican City	Joyce Napier	See list
Hungary; Co-accredited to: Bosnia and Herzegovina; Slovenia	Budapest	Judith Gelbman	See list
Iceland	Reykjavík	Jenny Hill	See list
India †; Co-accredited to: Bhutan; Nepal	New Delhi	Christopher Cooter	See list
Indonesia; Co-accredited to: Timor-Leste	Jakarta	Jess Dutton	See list
Iraq	Baghdad	Juliette Gundy	
Ireland	Dublin	Dennis King	See list
Israel	Tel Aviv	Leslie Scanlon	See list
Italy; Co-accredited to: Albania; Malta; San Marino	Rome	Elissa Golberg	See list
Ivory Coast; Co-accredited to: Liberia	Abidjan	Sandra Choufani	
Jamaica †; Co-accredited to: Bahamas	Kingston	Mark Berman	See list
Japan	Tokyo	Ian G. McKay	See list
Jordan	Amman	Louis-Martin Aumais	See list
Kazakhstan; Co-accredited to: Kyrgyzstan; Tajikistan; Turkmenistan; Uzbekistan	Astana	Christopher Duggan	See list
Kenya †; Co-accredited to: Burundi; Somalia; Uganda	Nairobi	Joshua Tabah	See list
Kuwait	Kuwait City	Tara Scheurwater	
Laos	Vientiane	Kent Vachon	
Latvia	Riga	Timothy Edwards	See list
Lebanon; Co-accredited to: Syria	Beirut	Gregory Galligan	See list
Libya	Non-resident; located in Tunisia	Allison Stewart	See list
Lithuania	Vilnius	Jeanette Sautner	
Malaysia †	Kuala Lumpur	Jodi Robinson	See list
Mali; Co-accredited to: Niger	Bamako		See list
Mexico	Mexico City	Cameron MacKay	See list
Mongolia	Ulaanbaatar	Stephen Doust	See list
Morocco; Co-accredited to: Mauritania	Rabat	Isabelle Valois	See list
Mozambique †; Co-accredited to: Angola; Eswatini	Maputo	Anderson Blanc	See list
Myanmar	Yangon	Allison Stewart	See list
Netherlands	The Hague	Hugh Adsett	See list
New Zealand †; Co-accredited to: Kiribati; Samoa; Tonga; Tuvalu	Wellington	Keith Smith	See list
Nigeria †; Co-accredited to: Equatorial Guinea; São Tomé and Príncipe	Abuja	Pasquale Salvaggio	See list
Norway	Oslo	Amy Baker	See list
Pakistan †	Islamabad	Tarik Khan	See list
Palestinian Authority	Ramallah	Graham Dattels	
Panama	Panama City	Patricia Atkinson	See list
Peru; Co-accredited to: Bolivia	Lima	Joya Donnelly	See list
Philippines	Manila	David Hartman	See list
Portugal	Lisbon	Elise Racicot	See list
Poland; Co-accredited to: Belarus	Warsaw	Emmanuelle Lamoureux	See list
Romania; Co-accredited to: Bulgaria; Moldova	Bucharest	Kevin Rex	See list
Qatar	Doha	Karim Morcos	See list
Russia	Moscow	Robert Brookfield	See list
Rwanda †	Kigali	Amrita Ellen Paul	
Saudi Arabia; Co-accredited to: Bahrain; Oman; Yemen	Riyadh	Jean-Philippe Linteau	See list
Senegal; Co-accredited to: Cape Verde; The Gambia; Guinea; Guinea-Bissau	Dakar	Sharon Armstrong	See list
Serbia; Co-accredited to: Montenegro; North Macedonia	Belgrade	Michelle Cameron	See list
Singapore †	Singapore	Paul Thoppil	See list
Slovakia	Bratislava	Karen Mollica	
South Africa †; Co-accredited to: Lesotho; Madagascar; Mauritius; Namibia	Pretoria	James Christoff	See list
South Korea; Co-accredited to: North Korea	Seoul	Philippe Lafortune	See list
South Sudan	Juba		
Spain; Co-accredited to: Andorra	Madrid	Jeffrey Marder	See list
Sri Lanka †; Co-accredited to: Maldives	Colombo	Isabelle Martin	See list
Sudan (suspended)	Khartoum		
Sweden	Stockholm	Robert Sinclair	See list
Switzerland; Co-accredited to: Liechtenstein	Bern	Jean-Paul Lemieux	See list
Syria (suspended)	Damascus		See list
Tanzania †; Co-accredited to: Comoros; Seychelles	Dar es Salaam	Emily Burns	See list
Thailand	Bangkok	Amanda Strohan	See list
Trinidad and Tobago †	Port of Spain	Michael Callan	See list
Tunisia	Tunis	Alexandre Bilodeau	See list
Turkey; Co-accredited to: Azerbaijan; Georgia	Ankara	Marcel Lebleu	See list
Ukraine	Kyiv	Tamara Mawhinney	See list
United Arab Emirates	Abu Dhabi	Angad Singh Dhillon	See list
United Kingdom †	London	Bill Blair	See list
United States	Washington, D.C.	Mark Wiseman	See list
Uruguay	Montevideo	Lindsey Partridge	See list
Venezuela (suspended)	Caracas	Vacant	See list
Vietnam	Hanoi	James Nickel	See list
Zambia †	Lusaka	Corry van Gaal	
Zimbabwe; Co-accredited to: Botswana; Malawi	Harare	Jeffrey Senior	See list
† - High Commissioner

== See also ==
- List of ambassadors and high commissioners to Canada
- List of Canadian diplomats
