= Lists of ambassadors of Canada =

Lists of ambassadors of Canada may refer to:

- List of ambassadors of Canada to Afghanistan
- List of ambassadors of Canada to Albania
- List of ambassadors of Canada to Algeria
- List of ambassadors of Canada to Angola
- List of high commissioners of Canada to Australia
- List of ambassadors of Canada to Austria
- List of high commissioners of Canada to Barbados
- List of ambassadors of Canada to Burkina Faso
- List of ambassadors of Canada to China
- List of ambassadors of Canada to France
- List of ambassadors of Canada to Germany
- List of ambassadors of Canada to Israel
- List of ambassadors of Canada to Japan
- List of ambassadors of Canada to Mexico
- List of high commissioners of Canada to New Zealand
- List of ambassadors of Canada to Romania
- List of ambassadors of Canada to Syria
- List of high commissioners of Canada to Trinidad and Tobago
- List of ambassadors of Canada to the United Arab Emirates
- List of high commissioners of Canada to the United Kingdom
- List of ambassadors of Canada to the United States
- List of ambassadors of Canada to Russia
- List of ambassadors and high commissioners of Canada to Ireland
- List of ambassadors of Canada to South Korea

== Multinational ==
- List of ambassadors of Canada to the European Union
- List of permanent representatives and observers of Canada to the Organization of American States
- List of permanent representatives of Canada to NATO
- Permanent Representative of Canada to the United Nations

== See also ==
- List of ambassadors and high commissioners of Canada
