= List of ambassadors of Canada to Belgium =

Ambassador of Canada to Belgium
- Incumbent; Alain Gendron since October 29, 2020
- Seat: Embassy of Canada, Brussels
- Nominator: Prime Minister of Canada
- Appointer: Governor General of Canada
- Term length: At His Majesty's pleasure
- Inaugural holder: Jean Désy
- Formation: December 22, 1938

The Ambassador of Canada to Belgium is the official representative of the Canadian government to the government of Belgium. The official title for the ambassador is Ambassador Extraordinary and Plenipotentiary of Canada to the Kingdom of Belgium. The current ambassador of Canada is Alain Gendron who was appointed on the advice of Prime Minister Justin Trudeau on October 29, 2020.

The Embassy of Canada is located at Avenue des Arts 58, 1000, Brussels, Belgium.

== History of diplomatic relations ==
Diplomatic relations between Canada and Belgium were established on January 3, 1939. Jean Désy was appointed as Canada's first ambassador to Belgium on December 22, 1938.

== Head of mission ==
No.	Name	Term of office			Career	Prime Minister nominated by	Ref.
No.	Name	Start Date	PoC.	End Date	Career	Prime Minister nominated by	Ref.
1	Jean Désy (Envoy)	December 22, 1938	February 4, 1939	October 31, 1940	Career	W. L. Mackenzie King (1935-1948)	
–	Pierre Dupuy (Chargé d'Affaires)	October 31, 1940		October 26, 1942	Career	W. L. Mackenzie King (1935-1948)	
2	George Philias Vanier (Envoy)	November 5, 1942	April 9, 1943	September 2, 1944	Career	W. L. Mackenzie King (1935-1948)	
–	Pierre Dupuy (Chargé d'Affaires)	December 30, 1943		September 8, 1944	Career	W. L. Mackenzie King (1935-1948)	
–	Thomas Archibald Stone (Chargé d'Affaires)	September 8, 1944		January 16, 1945	Career	W. L. Mackenzie King (1935-1948)	
3	William Ferdinand Alphonse Turgeon	October 3, 1944	January 16, 1945	January 21, 1947	Non-Career	W. L. Mackenzie King (1935-1948)	
4	Victor Doré	October 31, 1946	January 21, 1947	June 12, 1950	Non-Career	W. L. Mackenzie King (1935-1948)	
5	Maurice Arthur Pope	July 12, 1950	August 3, 1950	November 26, 1953	Career	Louis St. Laurent (1948-1957)	
6	Charles Pierre Hébert	October 21, 1953	January 14, 1954	December 14, 1958	Career	Louis St. Laurent (1948-1957)	
7	Sydney David Pierce	October 2, 1958	1959	October 31, 1965	Career	John G. Diefenbaker (1957-1963)	
8	Paul Tremblay	April 14, 1966	June 21, 1966	February 16, 1970	Career	Lester B. Pearson (1963-1968)	
9	James Coningsby Langley	December 10, 1970	December 17, 1970	March 1, 1973	Career	Pierre Elliott Trudeau (1968-1979)	
10	Jules Léger	March 1, 1973	March 1, 1973	January 8, 1974	Career	Pierre Elliott Trudeau (1968-1979)	
–	Jean-Yves Grenon (Chargé d'Affaires)	December 1, 1973		July 12, 1974	Career	Pierre Elliott Trudeau (1968-1979)	
11	Lucien Lamoureux	June 10, 1974	July 12, 1974	September 14, 1980	Non-Career	Pierre Elliott Trudeau (1968-1979)	
12	D'Iberville Fortier	July 10, 1980	October 7, 1980	August 3, 1984	Career	Pierre Elliott Trudeau (1968-1979)	
13	Maxwell Freeman Yalden	August 31, 1984	October 30, 1984	November 6, 1987	Career	John Turner (1984)	
14	Jacques J.A. Asselin	December 3, 1987	January 14, 1988	July 20, 1991	Career	Brian Mulroney (1984-1993)	
15	Raymond A.J. Chrétien	September 23, 1991	December 16, 1991	January 21, 1994	Career	Brian Mulroney (1984-1993)	
16	Jean-Paul Hubert	July 12, 1994	July 14, 1994	July 24, 1998	Career	Jean Chrétien (1993-2003)	
17	Claude Laverdure	August 4, 1998	October 6, 1998	August 2, 2000	Career	Jean Chrétien (1993-2003)	
18	Jacques Bilodeau	July 26, 2000	September 27, 2000	July 14, 2004	Career	Jean Chrétien (1993-2003)	
19	John A. McNee	August 9, 2004	October 12, 2004	May 26, 2006	Career	Paul Martin (2003-2006)	
20	Laurette Glasgow	September 20, 2006	October 25, 2006	August 29, 2008	Career	Stephen Harper (2006-2015)	
21	Louis de Lorimier	September 2, 2008	December 10, 2008	September 12, 2012	Career	Stephen Harper (2006-2015)	
22	Denis Robert	August 15, 2012	October 17, 2012	August 30, 2016	Career	Stephen Harper (2006-2015)	
23	Olivier Nicoloff	July 18, 2016	November 16, 2016	October 26, 2020	Career	Justin Trudeau (2015-Present)	
24	Alain Gendron	October 29, 2020	January 13, 2021		Career	Justin Trudeau (2015-Present)	
