= Pierre Asselin =

Pierre Asselin may refer to:

- Pierre-Aurèle Asselin (1881–1964), French Canadian furrier and tenor singer
- Pierre Léon Gérard Asselin, a high commissioner of Canada to Cameroon
