= Geneviève des Rivières =

Canadian diplomat

Ambassador of Canada to Algeria
- In office July 19, 2011 – 2014
- Preceded by: Patrick Parisot
- Succeeded by: Isabelle Roy

Personal details
- Born: 20th century Quebec, Canada
- Spouse: Paul Brazeau
- Education: University of Ottawa

Geneviève des Rivières is a Canadian political scientist and diplomat.

== Biography ==
Des Rivières was born in the French-speaking province of Quebec, and is married to Paul Brazeau.

She studied political science at the University of Ottawa, earning a master's degree in the same subject.

In 1982, she worked at the Ministry of Foreign Affairs and International Trade. Between 1984 and 1987 she served in the Canadian Mission in Chile. Subsequently, between 1987 and 1990, she was in the mission in Malaysia.

Between 1992 and 1994, des Rivières was deputy director of the Customs and Market Access Division of the Ministry of Foreign Affairs. Later, in 1996, she became director of the Corporate Planning and Program Analysis Division.

Between 2004 and 2008 she was Ambassador to Peru, concurrent to Bolivia. From 2009 to 2010 she was Ambassador to Colombia, and in 2011 she presented her credentials as Ambassador to Algeria, a rank she held until 2015.

Political offices
Preceded by Patrick Parisot	Ambassador of Canada to Algeria; 2011-2014	Succeeded by Isabelle Roy
Preceded by Matthew Levin	Ambassador of Canada to Colombia; December 2, 2008–September 1, 2011	Succeeded by Timothy Martin
Preceded by Hugues Rousseau	Ambassador of Canada to Peru; July 4, 2004–2008	Succeeded by Richard Lecoq
