= Desy =

Desy may refer to:

== People ==
- Desy Lumini (1936–1993), Italian composer, singer, and actress
- Desy Ratnasari (born 1973), Indonesian actress
- Jean Désy (1893–1960), Canadian diplomat

== Other uses ==
- DESY, a national research center in Germany
