= Brunei–Canada relations =

- Brunei: Canada

Diplomatic mission
- High Commission: High Commission

Envoy
- High Commissioner Vacant: High Commissioner Ambra Dickie

Brunei and Canada established diplomatic relations in 1984. Brunei has a high commission in Ottawa, and Canada has a high commission in Bandar Seri Begawan.

== History ==
Diplomatic relations were established 7 May 1984 following Brunei's independence.

== Economic relations ==
In 2012, Canada's exports to Brunei amounted to $4.3 million with the most export are in machinery, while Brunei's exports to Canada totalled $6.7 million mainly in organic chemicals. The trade relationship includes commerce across a number of sectors and Brunei become a potential market for Canadian companies particularly in oil and gas sectors, information and communication technologies (ICT), agriculture and agri-food, environment, aerospace and education. Other Canadian companies also has shown interest in investment.

== See also ==
- High Commission of Brunei, Ottawa
