= List of ambassadors of Canada to Colombia =

Ambassador of Canada to Colombia
- Incumbent; Marianick Tremblay since September 17, 2021
- Seat: Embassy of Canada, Bogata
- Nominator: Prime Minister of Canada
- Appointer: Governor General of Canada
- Term length: At His Majesty's pleasure
- Inaugural holder: Edmond Turcotte
- Formation: November 22, 1952

The ambassador of Canada to Colombia is the official representative of the Canadian government to the government of Colombia. The official title for the ambassador is Ambassador Extraordinary and Plenipotentiary of Canada to the Republic of Colombia. The ambassador of Canada to Colombia is Marianick Tremblay who was appointed on the advice of Prime Minister Justin Trudeau on September 17, 2021.

The Embassy of Canada is located at Cra. 7, No. 114-33, Piso 14, Bogotá, D.C. Colombia.

== History of diplomatic relations ==
Diplomatic relations between Canada and Colombia were established on November 6, 1952, with the first ambassador, Edmond Turcotte, appointed on the advice of Prime Minister Louis St. Laurent on November 22, 1952.

== List of ambassadors ==
No.	Name	Term of office			Career	Prime Minister nominated by	Ref.
No.	Name	Start Date	PoC.	End Date	Career	Prime Minister nominated by	Ref.
1	Edmond Turcotte	November 22, 1952	April 9, 1952	November 16, 1955	Non-Career	Louis St. Laurent (1948-1957)	
-	Wilfrid Bertram McCullough (Chargé d'Affaires)	November 16, 1955		April 5, 1957	Career	Louis St. Laurent (1948-1957)	
2	Robert Arthur Douglass Ford	January 17, 1957	April 5, 1957	December 13, 1958	Career	Louis St. Laurent (1948-1957)	
3	Jean Morin	April 14, 1959	June 11, 1959	June 2, 1961	Non-Career	John G. Diefenbaker (1957-1963)	
4	Theodore Francis Moorhouse Newton	July 31, 1961	October 4, 1961	January 29, 1964	Career	John G. Diefenbaker (1957-1963)	
5	Ormond Wilson Dier	July 3, 1964	October 7, 1964	March 2, 1967	Career	Lester B. Pearson (1963-1968)	
6	John Harrison Cleveland	April 19, 1967	June 28, 1967	July 11, 1970	Career	Lester B. Pearson (1963-1968)	
7	Sidney Allan Freifeld	May 28, 1970		June 20, 1975	Career	Pierre Elliott Trudeau (1968-1979)	
8	Pierre Robert Garceau	October 21, 1975		September 9, 1977	Non-Career	Pierre Elliott Trudeau (1968-1979)	
9	David Benson Laughton	October 27, 1977	December 1, 1977	December 18, 1979	Career	Pierre Elliott Trudeau (1968-1979)	
-	Laughton Donohue (Chargé d'Affaires)	December 1, 1979		August 1980	Career	Pierre Elliott Trudeau (1968-1979)	
10	George Douglas Valentine	July 10, 1980	September 25, 1980		Career	Pierre Elliott Trudeau (1968-1979)	
11	John Edward Guy (Ted) Gibson	October 13, 1983		August 28, 1987	Career	Pierre Elliott Trudeau (1968-1979)	
12	Gaëtan Lavertu	July 13, 1987	October 26, 1987	September 29, 1989	Career	Brian Mulroney (1984-1993)	
13	Dean John Browne	September 29, 1989	October 24, 1989		Career	Brian Mulroney (1984-1993)	
14	Archibald Duncan McArthur	August 6, 1993			Career	Kim Campbell (1993)	
15	Charles William Ross	June 3, 1996		August 14, 1999	Career	Jean Chrétien (1993-2003)	
16	Guillermo Rishchynski	June 10, 1999	June 14, 1999	August 30, 2002	Career	Jean Chrétien (1993-2003)	
17	Jean-Marc Duval	July 2, 2002	October 2002	July 26, 2005	Career	Jean Chrétien (1993-2003)	
18	Matthew Levin	June 21, 2005	November 15, 2005	July 24, 2008	Career	Paul Martin (2003-2006)	
19	Geneviève des Rivières	September 2, 2008	January 23, 2009	September 1, 2011	Career	Stephen Harper (2006-2015)	
20	Timothy Martin	July 19, 2011	October 25, 2011	December 15, 2013	Career	Stephen Harper (2006-2015)	
21	Carmen Sylvain	February 18, 2014	June 11, 2014	July 26, 2016	Career	Stephen Harper (2006-2015)	
22	Donald Bobiash	July 18, 2016	November 15, 2016	January 31, 2017	Career	Justin Trudeau (2015-Present)	
23	Marcel Lebleu	August 17, 2017	October 10, 2017	September 19, 2021	Career	Justin Trudeau (2015-Present)	
24	Marianick Tremblay	September 17, 2021	October 27, 2021		Career	Justin Trudeau (2015-Present)	

== See also ==
- Canada–Colombia relations
