= List of ambassadors of Canada to Chile =

Ambassador of Canada to Chile
- Incumbent; Michael Gort since September 24, 2020
- Seat: Santiago, Chile
- Nominator: Prime Minister of Canada
- Appointer: Governor General of Canada
- Term length: At His Majesty's pleasure
- Inaugural holder: William Ferdinand Alphonse Turgeon
- Formation: September 5, 1941

The ambassador of Canada to Chile is the official representative of the Canadian government to the government of Chile. The official title for the ambassador is Ambassador Extraordinary and Plenipotentiary of Canada to the Republic of Chile. The ambassador of Canada to Chile is Michael Gort who was appointed on the advice of Prime Minister Justin Trudeau on September 24, 2020.

The Embassy of Canada is located at Nueva Tajamar 481, Torre Norte, 12th Floor, Las Condes, Santiago, Chile.

== History of diplomatic relations ==
Diplomatic relations between Canada and Chile were established on November 14, 1940, with the first ambassador, William Ferdinand Alphonse Turgeon, appointed on the advice of Prime Minister W. L. Mackenzie King on July 31, 1941. The Canadian legation was given embassy status in 1945.

== List of head of mission to Chile ==
No.	Name	Term of office			Career	Prime Minister nominated by	Ref.
No.	Name	Start Date	PoC.	End Date	Career	Prime Minister nominated by	Ref.
1	William Ferdinand Alphonse Turgeon	September 5, 1941	January 2, 1942	February 27, 1943	Non-Career	W. L. Mackenzie King (1935-1948)	
2	Warwick Fielding Chipman	November 4, 1942	February 27, 1943		Non-Career	W. L. Mackenzie King (1935-1948)	
3	Warwick Fielding Chipman	May 15, 1944	July 8, 1944	August 20, 1945	Non-Career	W. L. Mackenzie King (1935-1948)	
–	Jules Léger (Chargé d'Affaires)	August 21, 1945		April 3, 1947	Career	W. L. Mackenzie King (1935-1948)	
4	Colin Fraser Elliott	November 7, 1946	April 3, 1947	April 1950	Non-Career	W. L. Mackenzie King (1935-1948)	
–	Guy Vigneux Beaudry (Chargé d'Affaires)	April 1950		May 17, 1951	Career	Louis St. Laurent (1948-1957)	
5	Léon Mayrand	February 18, 1951	May 17, 1951	April 1954	Career	Louis St. Laurent (1948-1957)	
–	Matthew Robert Macgowan Dale (Chargé d'Affaires)	April 1954			Career	Louis St. Laurent (1948-1957)	
6	Paul Émile Renaud	November 15, 1954	January 4, 1955	January 20, 1959	Career	Louis St. Laurent (1948-1957)	
–	Kenneth Bryce Williamson (Chargé d'Affaires)	January 31, 1959		March 4, 1960	Career	John G. Diefenbaker (1957-1963)	
7	Paul Tremblay	December 10, 1959	March 4, 1960	July 11, 1962	Career	John G. Diefenbaker (1957-1963)	
–	Jean-Yves Grenon (Chargé d'Affaires)	July 11, 1962		January 5, 1963	Career	John G. Diefenbaker (1957-1963)	
8	George Bernard Summers	October 23, 1962	January 5, 1963	June 23, 1970	Career	John G. Diefenbaker (1957-1963)	
9	Andrew Donald Ross	February 25, 1971	April 28, 1971	June 24, 1975	Career	Pierre Elliott Trudeau (1968-1979)	
10	André Réal Potvin	July 17, 1975	October 15, 1975	November 5, 1978	Career	Pierre Elliott Trudeau (1968-1979)	
11	Glen Garvie James David Buick	August 9, 1978	November 23, 1978	July 14, 1982	Career	Pierre Elliott Trudeau (1968-1979)	
12	Clayton George Bullis	September 22, 1982	October 7, 1982	October 1985	Career	Pierre Elliott Trudeau (1968-1979)	
13	Michel de Goumois	September 12, 1985	November 14, 1985	September 27, 1990	Career	Brian Mulroney (1984-1993)	
14	Michael T. Mace	September 12, 1990	November 9, 1990		Career	Brian Mulroney (1984-1993)	
15	Marc Lortie	January 5, 1993	August 4, 1993	August 8, 1997	Career	Brian Mulroney (1984-1993)	
16	Lawrence Lederman	July 10, 1997	November 11, 1997		Career	Jean Chrétien (1993-2003)	
17	Paul D. Durand	June 26, 2000			Career	Jean Chrétien (1993-2003)	
18	Patrick Parisot	July 16, 2001	September 5, 2001	July 2003	Career	Jean Chrétien (1993-2003)	
19	Bernard Giroux	July 31, 2003			Career	Jean Chrétien (1993-2003)	
20	Norbert Kalisch	June 14, 2006			Career	Stephen Harper (2006-2015)	
21	Sarah Fountain Smith	May 14, 2009			Career	Stephen Harper (2006-2015)	
22	Patricia Fuller	August 20, 2012	October 8, 2012	July 2015	Career	Stephen Harper (2006-2015)	
23	Marcel Lebleu	August 14, 2015	October 20, 2015	August 2017	Career	Stephen Harper (2006-2015)	
24	Patricia Pena	August 17, 2017	October 25, 2017	September 2020	Career	Justin Trudeau (2015-2025)	
25	Michael Gort	September 24, 2020	December 9, 2020		Career	Justin Trudeau (2015-2025)	
26	Karolina Guay	July 16, 2024			Career	Justin Trudeau (2015-2025)	

== See also ==
- Canada–Chile relations
- List of ambassadors and high commissioners of Canada
