= Eric Walsh =

Eric Walsh may refer to:

- Eric Walsh (One Life to Live), fictional character
- Eric Walsh (ambassador), Canadian diplomat

== See also ==
- Eric Welsh, British chemist and naval intelligence officer
