= Pierre Dupuy =

Pierre Dupuy may refer to:

- Pierre Dupuy (scholar) (1582–1651), French scholar
- Pierre Dupuy (diplomat) (1896–1969), Canadian diplomat
