= Alexandra Bugailiskis =

Canadian diplomat

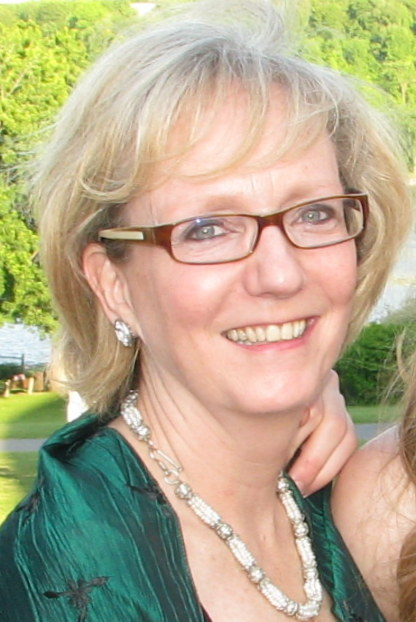
- Bugailiskis in 2012

Canadian Ambassador Extraordinary and Plenipotentiary to Albania
- In office 25 October 2017 – 17 November 2021
- Monarch: Elizabeth II
- Prime Minister: Justin Trudeau
- Preceded by: Peter McGovern
- Succeeded by: Elissa Golberg

Canadian Ambassador Extraordinary and Plenipotentiary to Italy
- In office 17 August 2017 – 17 November 2021
- Monarch: Elizabeth II
- Prime Minister: Justin Trudeau
- Preceded by: Peter McGovern
- Succeeded by: Elissa Golberg

Canadian High Commissioner to Malta
- In office 25 October 2017 – 17 November 2022
- Monarch: Elizabeth II
- Prime Minister: Justin Trudeau
- Preceded by: Peter McGovern
- Succeeded by: Elissa Golberg

Canadian Ambassador Extraordinary and Plenipotentiary to San Marino
- In office 17 August 2017 – 17 November 2022
- Monarch: Elizabeth II
- Prime Minister: Justin Trudeau
- Preceded by: Peter McGovern
- Succeeded by: Elissa Golberg

5th Canadian Permanent Representative to World Food Programme
- In office 17 August 2017 – 17 November 2021
- Monarch: Elizabeth II
- Prime Minister: Justin Trudeau
- Preceded by: Peter McGovern
- Succeeded by: Elissa Golberg

5th Canadian Permanent Representative to the International Fund for Agricultural Development
- In office 17 August 2017 – 17 November 2021
- Monarch: Elizabeth II
- Prime Minister: Justin Trudeau
- Preceded by: Peter McGovern
- Succeeded by: Elissa Golberg

5th Canadian Permanent Representative to the Food and Agriculture Organization of the United Nations
- In office 17 August 2017 – 17 November 2021
- Monarch: Elizabeth II
- Prime Minister: Justin Trudeau
- Preceded by: Peter McGovern
- Succeeded by: Elissa Golberg

Assistant Deputy Minister for Europe, the Middle East and the Maghreb
- In office 2015–2017
- Monarch: Elizabeth II
- Preceded by: Dan Costello
- Succeeded by: Stefanie Beck

Canadian Ambassador Extraordinary and Plenipotentiary to Poland
- In office 6 September 2012 – 9 October 2015
- Monarch: Elizabeth II
- Prime Minister: Stephen Harper
- Preceded by: Daniel Costello
- Succeeded by: Stephen De Boer

Canadian Ambassador Extraordinary and Plenipotentiary to Cuba
- In office 15 July 2003 – 3 August 2007
- Monarch: Elizabeth II
- Prime Minister: Jean Chrétien; Paul Martin; Stephen Harper
- Preceded by: Michael Small
- Succeeded by: Jean-Pierre Juneau

14th Canadian High Commissioner to Cyprus
- In office 12 March 1998 – 4 August 2000
- Monarch: Elizabeth II
- Prime Minister: Jean Chrétien
- Preceded by: David Berger
- Succeeded by: Franco D. Pillarella

13th Canadian Ambassador Extraordinary and Plenipotentiary to Syria
- In office 10 July 1997 – 4 August 2000
- Monarch: Elizabeth II
- Prime Minister: Jean Chrétien
- Preceded by: John A. McNee
- Succeeded by: Franco D. Pillarella

Personal details
- Born: 9 January 1956 (age 70) Hamilton, Ontario, Canada
- Education: Carleton University (BA Hons) Norman Paterson School of International Affairs (MA Hons)
- Occupation: Diplomat

Alexandra Bugailiskis CM (born 9 January 1956) is a Canadian former diplomat from Oakville, Ontario. In March 2022, she retired from Global Affairs Canada after a 39-year diplomatic career. In January 2023, she was appointed Chair of the International Advisory Committee of the United Nations University Institute for Water, Environment and Health, known as the UN's Think Tank on Water, based in Richmond Hill, Ontario, Canada. In 2025 she was awarded the King Charles III Coronation Medal for her contribution to the Oakville community and she was appointed to the Order of Canada for her contributions to shaping Canada's foreign policies and her mentoring of Canadian diplomats.

From August 2017 until her retirement, she served as the Canadian Ambassador to the Italian Republic, as well as Permanent Representative to the Food and Agriculture Organization of the United Nations, the World Food Programme, and the International Fund for Agricultural Development, with concurrent accreditation as Ambassador to San Marino and Albania, and as High Commissioner to Malta.

== Early life and education ==
Bugailiskis was born on 9 January 1956 in Hamilton, Ontario. She graduated from Carleton University with a Bachelor of Arts (Honours) and from the Norman Paterson School of International Affairs with a Master of Arts.

== Career ==
Bugailiskis served in various capacities abroad in Ghana, and Guatemala before becoming Canadian Ambassador to Syria (1997-2000), High Commissioner to Cyprus (1998-2000), Ambassador to Cuba (2003-2007), and Ambassador to Poland (2012-2015).

In Ottawa she served as Director for Central America and the Caribbean, Director General and later Assistant Deputy Minister Latin America and the Caribbean, Assistant Deputy Minister for Europe, Middle East, Maghreb and the Arctic. She was also the Chief Negotiator for the Canada-European Union Strategic Partnership Agreement.

On her last posting Bugailiskis served as the Canadian Ambassador to Italy from August 2017 until December 2021, during which she was also Canada's Permanent Representative to the Food and Agriculture Organization, the World Food Programme, and the International Fund for Agricultural Development. In addition to her role in Italy, she was accredited as Ambassador to San Marino and Albania, as well as High Commissioner to Malta.

After her retirement in March 2022 from a 39-year diplomatic career with Global Affairs Canada, Bugailiskis was appointed Chair of the International Advisory Committee of the United Nations University Institute for Water, Environment and Health in January 2023.

== Memberships ==
Bugailiskis is the Chair of the International Advisory Committee of the United Nations University Institute for Water, Environment and Health in Richmond Hill, Ontario, Canada. She is also a member of the Distinguished Advisory Council of the Norman Paterson School of International Affairs. She previously served on the advisory board of the Canadian Executive MBA at the SGH-Warsaw School of Economics and on the Board of Directors of FOCAL, The Canadian Foundation for the Americas.

== See also ==
- List of ambassadors and high commissioners of Canada
  - List of ambassadors of Canada to Albania
  - List of ambassadors of Canada to Cuba
  - List of ambassadors of Canada to Syria
