= List of ambassadors of Canada to Argentina =

Ambassador of Canada to Argentina
- Incumbent; Reid Sirrs since December 20, 2021
- Seat: Embassy of Canada to Argentina, Buenos Aires
- Nominator: Prime Minister of Canada
- Appointer: Governor General of Canada
- Term length: At His Majesty's pleasure
- Inaugural holder: William Ferdinand Alphonse Turgeon
- Formation: July 31, 1941

The ambassador of Canada to Argentina is the official representative of the Canadian government to the government of Argentina. The official title for the ambassador is Ambassador Extraordinary and Plenipotentiary of Canada to the Argentine Republic. The current Canadian ambassador is Reid Sirrs who was appointed on the advice of Prime Minister Justin Trudeau on December 20, 2021.

The Embassy of Canada is located at Tagle 2828, C1425EEH Buenos Aires, Argentina.

== History of diplomatic relations ==
Diplomatic relations between Canada and Argentina was established on November 14, 1940. A legation was established on November 13, 1941, and was raised to full embassy status on October 1, 1945. William Ferdinand Alphonse Turgeon was appointed as Canada's first Ambassador to Argentina on July 31, 1941.

== List of ambassadors ==
No.	Name	Term of office			Career	Prime Minister nominated by	Ref.
No.	Name	Start Date	PoC.	End Date	Career	Prime Minister nominated by	Ref.
1	William Ferdinand Alphonse Turgeon	July 31, 1941	November 13, 1941	February 1, 1944	Non-Career	W. L. Mackenzie King (1935-1948)	(Note: Titled as Envoy Extraordinary and Minister Plenipotentiary)
–	Kenneth Porter Kirkwood	February 1, 1944		October 1, 1945	Career	W. L. Mackenzie King (1935-1948)	(Note: Chargé d'Affaires ad interim)
2	Warwick Fielding Chipman	August 7, 1945	October 1, 1945	March 30, 1949	Non-Career	W. L. Mackenzie King (1935-1948)	
3	John Doherty Kearney	March 31, 1949	September 22, 1949	October 28, 1951	Non-Career	Louis St. Laurent (1948-1957)	
–	Lionel Victor Joseph Roy	October 28, 1951		August 19, 1952	Career	Louis St. Laurent (1948-1957)	
4	Léo Richer Laflèche	April 4, 1952	August 19, 1952	June 1, 1955	Non-Career	Louis St. Laurent (1948-1957)	
5	Louis-Philippe Picard	August 5, 1955	November 24, 1955	June 10, 1957	Non-Career	Louis St. Laurent (1948-1957)	
6	Richard Plant Bower	November 5, 1958	February 11, 1959	December 4, 1962	Career	John G. Diefenbaker (1957-1963)	
7	Léon Mayrand	November 29, 1962	January 31, 1963	February 23, 1964	Career	John G. Diefenbaker (1957-1963)	
–	Edward Ritchie Bellemare	February 23, 1964		August 31, 1964	Career	Lester B. Pearson (1963-1968)	
8	Jean Bruchési	June 4, 1964		1967	Non-Career	Lester B. Pearson (1963-1968)	
9	Robert Choquette	February 29, 1968	June 12, 1968	August 3, 1970	Non-Career	Lester B. Pearson (1963-1968)	
10	Alfred Pike Bissonnet	July 9, 1970	October 21, 1970	March 1, 1978	Career	Pierre Elliott Trudeau (1968-1979)	
11	Dwight Wilder Fulford	August 31, 1977	March 28, 1978	September 2, 1982	Career	Pierre Elliott Trudeau (1968-1979)	
12	Lorne Sheldon Clark	September 22, 1982	September 20, 1982		Career	Pierre Elliott Trudeau (1968-1979)	
13	Louise Fréchette	March 29, 1985	June 17, 1985	August 10, 1988	Career	Brian Mulroney (1984-1993)	
14	Clayton George Bullis	August 11, 1988	September 22, 1988	September 11, 1991	Career	Brian Mulroney (1984-1993)	
15	Robert J. Rochon	September 19, 1991	October 28, 1991	September 1, 1994	Career	Brian Mulroney (1984-1993)	
16	Robert G. Clark	July 12, 1994	October 26, 1994	August 29, 1998	Career	Jean Chrétien (1993-2003)	
17	Jean-Paul Hubert	July 15, 1998		July 4, 2001	Career	Jean Chrétien (1993-2003)	
18	Thomas MacDonald	July 16, 2001		2004	Career	Jean Chrétien (1993-2003)	
19	Yves Gagnon	August 9, 2004			Career	Paul Martin (2003-2006)	
20	Timothy Martin	July 31, 2007	September 25, 2007	June 4, 2010	Career	Stephen Harper (2006-2015)	
21	Gwyneth Kutz	August 10, 2010	November 1, 2010		Career	Stephen Harper (2006-2015)	
22	Robert Fry	February 2, 2015	April 23, 2015	August 2018	Career	Stephen Harper (2006-2015)	
23	David Usher	September 24, 2018	November 6, 2018	October 28, 2021	Career	Justin Trudeau (2015-Present)	
24	Reid Sirrs	December 20, 2021	January 25, 2022		Career	Justin Trudeau (2015-Present)	

== See also ==
- List of ambassadors and high commissioners of Canada
