= Michael Small (disambiguation) =

Michael or Mike Small may refer to:

- Mike Small (footballer) (born 1962), English former footballer
- Mike Small (golfer) (born 1966), American golfer and college golf coach
- Mike Small (author), activist, writer and publisher
- Michael Small (1939–2003), American film score composer
- Michael Small (diplomat), Canadian ambassador to Cuba preceding Alexandra Bugailiskis
