= List of ambassadors of Canada to Zimbabwe =

Ambassador of Canada to Zimbabwe
- Incumbent; Christina Buchan since November 11, 2020
- Seat: Embassy of Canada to Zimbabwe, Harare
- Nominator: Prime Minister of Canada
- Appointer: Governor General of Canada
- Term length: At His Majesty's pleasure
- Inaugural holder: Terence Charles Bacon
- Formation: April 17, 1980 as Canadian High Commissioner to Zimbabwe

The Canadian Ambassador to Zimbabwe is the official representative of the Canadian government to the government of Zimbabwe. The official title for the ambassador is Ambassador Extraordinary and Plenipotentiary of Canada to the Republic of Zimbabwe. The current Canadian ambassador is Christina Buchan who was appointed on the advice of Prime Minister Justin Trudeau on November 11, 2020.

The Embassy of Canada is located at 45 Baines Avenue, Harare, Zimbabwe.

== History of diplomatic relations ==
Prime Minister Lester B. Pearson refused to recognize Rhodesia's Unilateral Declaration of Independence on 11 November 1965 Diplomatic relations between Canada and Zimbabwe was established on April 17, 1980, after Rhodesia became independent within the Commonwealth as Republic of Zimbabwe. Terence Charles Bacon was appointed as Canada's first High Commissioner to Zimbabwe on April 17, 1980.

== List of Ambassadors (since 2003) and High Commissioners (1980 - 2003) ==
No.	Name	Term of office			Career	Prime Minister nominated by	Ref.
No.	Name	Start Date	PoC.	End Date	Career	Prime Minister nominated by	Ref.
1	Terence Charles Bacon	April 17, 1980	April 30, 1980		Career	Pierre Elliott Trudeau (1980–1984)	
2	Robert Wallace McLaren	July 10, 1980			Career	Pierre Elliott Trudeau (1980–1984)	
3	Roger Anthony Bull	April 5, 1984		October 14, 1989	Career	Pierre Elliott Trudeau (1980–1984)	
4	Charles Philip Bassett	October 19, 1989	November 2, 1989	September 3, 1993	Career	Brian Mulroney (1984–1993)	
5	Arthur Robert Wright	September 11, 1993			Career	Kim Campbell (1993)	
6	Margaret Anne Charles	July 12, 1996	October 4, 1996	August 16, 1999	Career	Jean Chrétien (1993–2003)	
7	James Wall	August 11, 1999	October 7, 1999		Career	Jean Chrétien (1993–2003)	
8	John Schram	July 2, 2002			Career	Jean Chrétien (1993–2003)	
9	Roxanne Dubé	August 19, 2005		July 2008	Career	Paul Martin (2003–2006)	
10	Barbara Richardson	September 2, 2008	October 16, 2008	June 23, 2011	Career	Stephen Harper (2006–2015)	
11	Lisa Stadelbauer	September 21, 2011	December 20, 2011	August 2015	Career	Stephen Harper (2006–2015)	
12	Kumar Gupta	August 27, 2015	October 2015	July 2017	Career	Stephen Harper (2006–2015)	
13	René Cremonese	August 17, 2017	October 25, 2017	November 2020	Career	Justin Trudeau (2015–Present)	
14	Christina Buchan	November 11, 2020	February 18, 2021		Career	Justin Trudeau (2015–Present)	

== See also ==
- List of ambassadors and high commissioners of Canada
