= Embassy of Canada, Lima =

Canadian diplomatic mission in Peru

Embassy of Canada in Peru
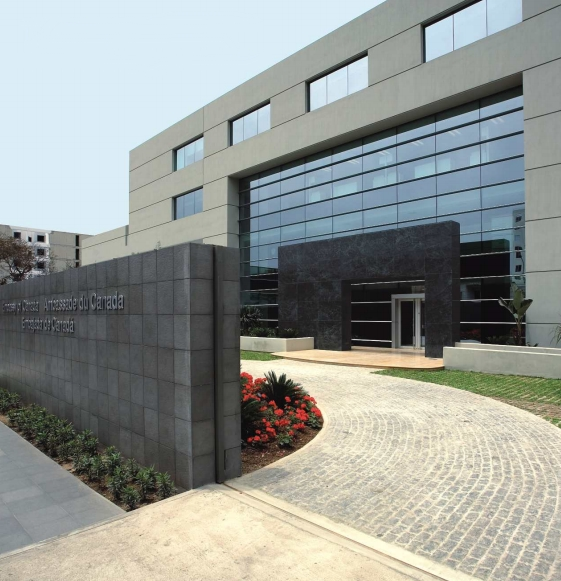
- Location: Lima, Peru
- Address: Av. Bolognesi 228
- Opened: October 21, 1944
- Ambassador: Louis Marcotte
- Jurisdiction: Peru; Bolivia
- Website: Official website

The Embassy of Canada in Peru (French: Ambassade du Canada au Pérou, Spanish: Embajada de Canadá en Perú) represents the permanent diplomatic mission of Canada in Peru. The embassy is also accredited to Bolivia.

The current Canadian ambassador to Peru is Louis Marcotte.

== History ==
Canada and Peru established diplomatic relations on 21 October 1944. Initially, relations between both nations took place in multilateral organizations. In May 1970, Canadian forces arrived in Peru soon after the Ancash earthquake to deliver humanitarian aid for two months in response to the request by President Juan Velasco Alvarado.

The Canadian Embassy was established on October 21, 1944.

In February 1997, during the Japanese embassy hostage crisis in Lima; Peruvian President Alberto Fujimori flew to Toronto and met with the Japanese Prime Minister, Ryutaro Hashimoto, to discuss Peru's handling of the hostage siege. Canada was chosen as a meeting place for the two heads of state because its Ambassador to Lima, Anthony Vincent, was a member of a commission of guarantors established to oversee negotiations to end the crisis.

In March 2018, Peruvian President, Pedro Pablo Kuczynski, was impeached from power. Martín Vizcarra was Ambassador of Peru to Canada and simultaneously was First Vice President of Peru. Upon the impeachment of President Kuczynski, Vizcarra left Canada and returned to Peru to take up the Presidency. In April 2018, Prime Minister Trudeau returned to Peru to attend the 8th Summit of the Americas in Lima. During his visit, Prime Minister Trudeau met with President Vizcarra and both leaders discussed enhancing bilateral commercial relations and underscored the many opportunities that exist for collaboration between Canadian and Peruvian companies. The Prime Minister and President also discussed the Crisis in Venezuela.

=== Residence ===
The embassy's residence is a private domicile located at 68 Club Golf los Incas Avenue, in Santiago de Surco District.

== List of representatives ==
This Canadian diplomatic representation is headed by a head of mission who bears the title of ambassador extraordinary and plenipotentiary.

| # | Name | Title | Nomination | Letter of credence | End |
|---|---|---|---|---|---|
| 1st | Jean François Léon Henri Laureys | AEP | 1944/06/21 | 1944/10/21 | 1946/11 |
| 2nd | Freeman Massey Tovell | CA | 1946/11 | - | 1947/06/21 |
| 3rd | James Alexander Strong | AEP | 1947/03/18 | 1947/06/21 | 1949/05 |
| 4th | James Murray Cook | CA | 1949/05 | - | 1950/09/27 |
| 5th | Joseph Jacques Janvier Émile Vaillancourt | AEP | 1950/02/10 | 1950/09/27 | - |
| 6th | Donald Harry Cheney | CA | 1955/01 | - | 1958/09/13 |
| 7th | Evan Benjamin Rogers | AEP | 1955/06/23 | 1955/08/18 | 1958/01/25 |
| 8th | Alfred John Pick | AEP | 1958/06/26 | 1958/09/13 | 1962/04/03 |
| 9th | Freeman Massey Tovell | AEP | 1962/09/27 | 1962/11/07 | 1965/10/19 |
| 10th | Joseph François-Xavier Houde | AEP | 1965/09/02 | 1965/12/07 | 1970/08/05 |
| 11th | Pierre Edgar Joseph Charpentier | AEP | 1970/06/18 | 1970/10/12 | 1972/08/11 |
| 12th | Pierre L. Trottier | AEP | 1973/09/04 | 1973/10/17 | 1976/07/06 |
| 13th | Ormond Wilson Dier | AEP | 1976/05/27 | 1976/11/24 | 1979/08/25 |
| 14th | Jean-Yves Grenon | AEP | 1979/04/04 | 1979/10/24 | 1982/08/20 |
| 15th | Michael Richard Bell | AEP | 1981/07/29 | 1981/10/06 | 1985/06 |
| 16th | Keith Arthur Bezanson | AEP | 1985/08/07 | 1985/09/06 | 1988/04 |
| 17th | Margaret Anne Charles | AEP | 1988/08/11 | 1988/09/26 | - |
| 18th | James Darrell Leach | AEP | 1990/09/12 | 1990/09/19 | - |
| 19th | Anthony Vincent | AEP | 1992/02/11 | 1994/03/09 | 1997/06/18 |
| 20th | Graeme C. Clark | AEP | 1997/07/10 | 1997/08/19 | 2001/08/27 |
| 21st | Hugues Rousseau | AEP | 2001/07/16 | 2001/09/28 | 2004/08/15 |
| 22nd | Geneviève des Rivières | AEP | 2004/08/09 | 2004/08/28 | 2008 |
| 23rd | Richard Lecoq | AEP | 2008/07/04 | 2009/01/08 | - |
| 24th | Patricia Fortier | AEP | 2012/11/08 | 2012/12/13 | 2015 |
| 25th | Gwyneth Kutz | AEP | 2015/07/31 | 2016/01/21 | 2019/09 |
| 26th | Ralph Jansen | AEP | 2019/08/26 | 2019/10/23 | - |

== See also ==
- List of ambassadors of Peru to Canada
