= List of permanent representatives and observers of Canada to the Organization of American States =

List of permanent representatives and observers of Canada to the Organization of American States. The Permanent Representatives and Observers of Canada to the OAS have held the rank and status of Ambassador. Canada was a permanent observer at the OAS until 1990, when it became a permanent member.

Ambassador	Start of term	End of term	Representative or observer
Alfred John Pick	February 2, 1972	December 30, 1975	Observer
Michel Antonin Careau	December 30, 1975	August 20, 1976	Observer
Arthur Edward Blanchette	May 11, 1976	September 14, 1980	Observer
Kenneth Bryce Williamson	July 10, 1980	December 1983	Observer
Pierre Edgar Joseph Charpentier	April 5, 1984	August 28, 1987	Observer
Richard Vessot Gorham	December 10, 1987	1990	Observer
Jean-Paul Hubert	January 5, 1990	1997	Representative
Peter Boehm	July 10, 1997	2001	Representative
Paul D. Durand	July 16, 2001	2006	Representative
Graeme C. Clark	June 14, 2006	September 2010	Representative
Allan Culham	September 2010	2015	Representative
Jennifer May Loten	September 2, 2015	2019	Representative
Hugh Adsett	August 2019		Representative

== See also ==
- List of ambassadors and high commissioners of Canada
