= Raymond Chrétien =

Canadian diplomat

Raymond Chrétien CC AdE
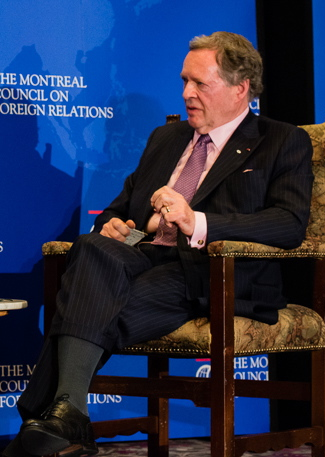
- Chrétien during a discussion in 2014

Canadian Ambassador to France
- In office September 12, 2000 – November, 2003
- Prime Minister: Jean Chretien
- Preceded by: Jacques Silva Roy
- Succeeded by: Claude Laverdure

Canadian Ambassador to the United States
- In office 1994 – October 26, 2000
- Prime Minister: Jean Chretien
- Preceded by: John de Chastelain
- Succeeded by: Michael Kergin

Canadian Ambassador to Belgium
- In office December 16, 1991 – January 21, 1994
- Prime Minister: Jean Chretien; Kim Campbell; Brian Mulroney
- Preceded by: Jacques J.A. Asselin
- Succeeded by: Jean-Paul Hubert

Canadian Ambassador to Mexico
- In office December 9, 1985 – October 29, 1988
- Prime Minister: Brian Mulroney
- Preceded by: James Russell McKinney

Personal details
- Born: May 20, 1942 (age 84) Shawinigan, Quebec, Canada
- Spouse: Kay Rousseau
- Relations: Jean Chrétien (uncle)
- Children: 2
- Occupation: Lawyer, diplomat

Raymond A. J. Chrétien CC AdE (born May 20, 1942) is a Canadian lawyer and diplomat. He served as ambassador to the United States from 1994–2000. His uncle, Jean Chrétien, was the 20th prime minister from 1993 to 2003.

== Early years ==
Born and raised in Shawinigan, Quebec, Chrétien graduated with a Bachelor's degree from Séminaire de Joliette (now part of Cégep régional de Lanaudière) and then Laval University in Law.

== Diplomatic career ==
After being admitted to the Quebec Bar, Chrétien entered the Legal Affairs Bureau of the Department of External Affairs and the Department of Foreign Affairs in 1966.

His positions include:

- Democratic Republic of the Congo (Zaire): 1978–1981
- Mexico: 1985–1988
- Belgium: 1991–1994
- United States: 1994–2000
- France: 2000–2003

From 1988 to 1991, Chrétien was an associate in the office of the Secretary of State for External Affairs. In 1996, he was named Special Envoy to the U.N. for the Great Lakes and Central Africa.

== Post-government career ==
In 2004, he joined the law firm Fasken Martineau DuMoulin and in December 2005, joined the Pierre Elliott Trudeau Foundation. Since April 2004, he is Chairman of the board of the Centre for International Studies of the Université de Montréal (CÉRIUM). He is also a member of the Trilateral Commission.

== Personal life ==
Chrétien is the nephew of former prime minister Jean Chrétien. He is married to Kay Rousseau; they have two children—Caroline Chrétien and Louis-François Chrétien. In addition to his native French, Chrétien is fluent in English and Spanish.

== Awards ==
He holds many honours and titles, including Officer of the Order of Canada, Commander in the Legion of Honour (France) and Officer of the Order of the Aztec Eagle. He was appointed an Officer of the Order of Canada in 2010. In 2019 he was promoted within the Order of Canada to the highest grade of Companion by Governor General Julie Payette. This will give him the Post Nominal Letters "CC" for Life.

== See also ==
- Université Laval
