= John McNee (diplomat) =

Canadian diplomat

John A. McNee

21st Canadian Ambassador to the United Nations
- In office 1 July 2006 – July 2011
- Monarch: Elizabeth II
- Prime Minister: Stephen Harper
- Preceded by: Allan Rock
- Succeeded by: Guillermo Rishchynski

Canadian Ambassador Extraordinary and Plenipotentiary to Luxembourg
- In office 14 September 2004 – 26 May 2006
- Monarch: Elizabeth II
- Prime Minister: Paul Martin; Stephen Harper
- Preceded by: Jacques Bilodeau
- Succeeded by: Laurette Glasgow

19th Canadian Ambassador Extraordinary and Plenipotentiary to Belgium
- In office 9 August 2004 – 26 May 2006
- Monarch: Elizabeth II
- Prime Minister: Paul Martin; Stephen Harper
- Preceded by: Jacques Bilodeau
- Succeeded by: Laurette Glasgow

Canadian Ambassador Extraordinary and Plenipotentiary to Lebanon
- In office 15 December 1993 – 1994
- Monarch: Elizabeth II
- Prime Minister: Jean Chrétien
- Preceded by: David Martin Collacott
- Succeeded by: Daniel Marchand

12th Canadian Ambassador Extraordinary and Plenipotentiary to Syria
- In office 15 December 1993 – 14 July 1997
- Monarch: Elizabeth II
- Prime Minister: Jean Chrétien
- Preceded by: David Martin Collacott
- Succeeded by: Alexandra Bugailiskis

Personal details
- Born: 1951 London, Ontario
- Children: 2
- Profession: Diplomat

John McNee (born 1951) is a Canadian career diplomat who served as Canada's Ambassador to the United Nations from 2006 to 2011.

== Early life and education ==
McNee was born in London, Ontario, in 1951. He earned a Bachelor of Arts in History from York University in Ontario in 1973 and a Master of Arts in History from Cambridge University in the United Kingdom in 1975. He was awarded the title of Canada Scholar during his studies at Cambridge.

== Career ==
McNee joined the Department of External Affairs in 1978 and held several roles, including postings in Madrid, the London, and Tel Aviv. In Ottawa, he served within the Foreign and Defence Policy Secretariat of the Privy Council Office and held positions in the Policy Development Secretariat, Prime Minister’s Task Force on International Peace and Security, and the Canada-United States Transboundary Division.

From 1993 to 1997, McNee was the Canadian Ambassador Extraordinary and Plenipotentiary to Syria, and to Lebanon concurrently. Upon returning to Canada, he became Director of the Personnel Division and later served as Director General for the Middle East, North Africa, and Gulf States Bureau in the Department of Foreign Affairs.

From 2004 to 2006, McNee served as Canada's Ambassador Extraordinary and Plenipotentiary to Belgium and to Luxembourg concurrently. His appointment as Canada’s Ambassador to the United Nations was announced in February 2006, and he succeeded Allan Rock in the role in July 2006.

=== Later work ===
In June 2011, McNee was appointed the first Secretary-General of the Global Centre for Pluralism. Based in Ottawa, the Centre for Pluralism is an initiative of the Aga Khan in partnership with the Government of Canada. As Secretary-General, McNee was responsible for building the Centre’s institutional and intellectual capacities as a global knowledge hub, working with its international Board of Directors.

== Personal life ==
McNee and his wife, Susan, have two children.

== See also ==
- List of ambassadors and high commissioners of Canada
