= Claude Laverdure (diplomat) =

Canadian diplomat

Claude Laverdure was Canada's Ambassador Extraordinary and Plenipotentiary to France from 2003 until 2007 and was also ambassador to Luxembourg. He was previously Ambassador to Belgium, the Democratic Republic of Congo, Burundi, Rwanda, Zaire and to Haiti.

He is an honorary senior fellow at the University of Ottawa's Graduate School of Public and International Affairs.

Diplomatic posts
Preceded by Raymond Chrétien	Canadian Ambassador to France; September 15, 2003–2007	Succeeded by Marc Lortie
Preceded by John McNee	Canadian Ambassador to Luxembourg; March 19, 1999–2007	Succeeded by
Preceded by Jean-Paul Hubert	Canadian Ambassador to Belgium; August 4, 1998–August 2, 2000	Succeeded by John McNee
Preceded by Colleen Leora Cupples	Canadian Ambassador to the Democratic Republic of Congo; November 23, 1989–September 7, 1992	Succeeded by Réjean Frenette
Preceded by Colleen Leora Cupples	Canadian Ambassador to Burundi, Rwanda and Zaire; September 28, 1989–September 7, 1992	Succeeded by Réjean Frenette
Preceded by Joseph Anthony Malone	Canadian Ambassador to Haiti; July 23, 1986–July 22, 1988	Succeeded by Pierre Giguère
