= List of ambassadors of Canada to Egypt =

Ambassador of Canada to Egypt
- Incumbent; Ulric Shannon since July 26, 2024
- Seat: Embassy of Canada, Cairo
- Nominator: Prime Minister of Canada
- Appointer: Governor General of Canada
- Term length: At His Majesty's pleasure
- Inaugural holder: Kenneth Porter Kirkwood
- Formation: November 18, 1954

The Ambassador of Canada to Egypt is the official representative of the Canadian government to the government of Egypt. The official title for the ambassador is Ambassador Extraordinary and Plenipotentiary of Canada to the Arab Republic of Egypt. The current ambassador of Canada is Ulric Shannon who was appointed on the advice of Prime Minister Justin Trudeau on July 26, 2024. Ulric Shannon was previously the ambassador to Iraq from 2019 to 2021.

== History of diplomatic relations ==
Diplomatic recognition between Canada and Egypt was established on June 25, 1953, and diplomatic relations were established on July 28, 1953. Kenneth Porter Kirkwood was appointed as Canada's first Ambassador in Egypt on November 18, 1954.

== List of heads of mission ==
No.	Name	Term of office			Career	Prime Minister nominated by	Ref.
No.	Name	Start date	PoC.	End date	Career	Prime Minister nominated by	Ref.
–	Arthur Edward Blanchette (Chargé d'Affaires)	October 19, 1954			Career	Louis St. Laurent (1948–1957)	
1	Kenneth Porter Kirkwood	November 18, 1954	December 27, 1954		Career	Louis St. Laurent (1948–1957)	
2	Egerton Herbert Norman	April 4, 1956	August 19, 1956	April 4, 1957	Career	Louis St. Laurent (1948–1957)	
3	Ronald Macalister Macdonnell	June 13, 1957	June 15, 1957	August 30, 1958	Career	John G. Diefenbaker (1957–1963)	
4	Arnold Cantwell Smith	September 25, 1958	November 4, 1958	January 16, 1961	Career	John G. Diefenbaker (1957–1963)	
5	Robert Arthur Douglass Ford	January 11, 1961	June 11, 1961	January 5, 1964	Career	John G. Diefenbaker (1957–1963)	
6	Jean Chapdelaine	October 24, 1963	February 27, 1964	December 12, 1964	Career	Lester B. Pearson (1963–1968)	
7	John Kennett Starnes	February 23, 1966	June 6, 1966		Career	Lester B. Pearson (1963–1968)	
8	Thomas Lemesurier Carter	September 28, 1967	November 20, 1967	December 29, 1970	Career	Lester B. Pearson (1963–1968)	
–	Gary Richard Harman (Chargé d'Affaires)	December 29, 1970		August 1, 1971	Career	Pierre Elliott Trudeau (1968–1979) (1980–1984)	
9	David Stansfield	July 8, 1971	August 1, 1971	July 8, 1974	Career	Pierre Elliott Trudeau (1968–1979) (1980–1984)	
10	Jean-Marcel Touchette	June 10, 1974	October 29, 1974	July 24, 1977	Career	Pierre Elliott Trudeau (1968–1979) (1980–1984)	
11	Jean-Marie Gaétan Déry	August 4, 1977	October 16, 1977	August 25, 1980	Career	Pierre Elliott Trudeau (1968–1979) (1980–1984)	
12	Robert L. Elliott	July 10, 1980	November 4, 1980	1983	Career	Pierre Elliott Trudeau (1968–1979) (1980–1984)	
13	John Pontoppidan Schioler	October 13, 1983	October 22, 1983	January 21, 1985	Career	Pierre Elliott Trudeau (1968–1979) (1980–1984)	
14	Marc Perron	June 27, 1985	December 3, 1985		Career	Brian Mulroney (1984–1993)	
15	Marc Brault	August 11, 1988	September 19, 1988	July 16, 1990	Career	Brian Mulroney (1984–1993)	
16	Jacques T. Simard	September 12, 1990	September 25, 1990		Career	Brian Mulroney (1984–1993)	
17	Michael Dougall Bell	July 15, 1994	November 8, 1994	July 23, 1998	Career	Jean Chrétien (1993–2003)	
18	Marie-Andrée Beauchemin	July 15, 1998	November 10, 1998		Career	Jean Chrétien (1993–2003)	
19	Michel de Salaberry	July 16, 2001			Career	Jean Chrétien (1993–2003)	
20	Philip MacKinnon	May 19, 2004			Career	Paul Martin (2003–2006)	
21	Ferry de Kerckhove	September 2, 2008	October 26, 2008		Career	Stephen Harper (2006–2015)	
22	David Drake	September 21, 2011	December 11, 2011			Stephen Harper (2006–2015)	
23	Troy Lulashnyk	September 2, 2014	November 22, 2014	July 6, 2017	Career	Stephen Harper (2006–2015)	
24	Jess Dutton	August 17, 2017	October 2, 2017	September 2020	Career	Justin Trudeau (2015–2025)	
25	Louis Dumas	November 11, 2020		August 15, 2025	Career	Justin Trudeau (2015–2025)	
26	Ulric Shannon	July 26, 2024	March 24, 2025		Career	Justin Trudeau (2015–2025)	
