= Montreal Centre for International Studies =

Coordinates: 45°29′42″N 73°37′18″W

The Montréal Centre for International Studies (French: Centre d'études et de recherches internationales), known as Cérium, is a research centre of the Université de Montréal specializing in international studies.

== Goals of Cérium ==
Launched in April 2004, Cérium is a new centre in the field of international research in Québec and Canada.

== Cérium team ==
- Raymond Chrétien (Chairman)
- François Crépeau (Scientific Director)
- Jean-François Lisée (Executive Director)
- Jean-Philippe Thérien (Assistant Scientific Director)

== The research units ==
- Canadian Centre for German and European Studies
- Centre for East-Asian Studies
- Centre on Development of International Research on Environment
- Chair in American Political and Economic Studies
- Canada Research Chair on International Migratory Law
- Jean Monnet Chair in European Integration
- Research Group in International Security
- Institute for European Studies
- Research Group on Development
- International Economy Network
- Research Network on Peace Operations
- Middle-East Network
- Chair in Contemporary Mexican Studies

== Cérium activities ==
Every Spring, CERIUM organizes a major conference, alternating in focus between a European country and a North American topic. In the Spring of 2005, the conference What ever happened to Cool Britannia? The UK after eight years of Blair brought together thirty of the brightest scholars from Britain and North America to discuss the United Kingdom of Tony Blair. The Spring 2006 conference was entitled Conservative predominance in the U.S. A Moment or an Era?. Scholars from the US, Europe and Canada debated the different facts of American, and Canadian, conservatism. Former George W. Bush speechwriter David Frum was keynote speaker.

== Summer schools ==
The Cérium offers intensive summer schools organized for citizens interested in international issues, as well as local and foreign graduate students. These one week summer schools take place during the first two weeks of July, so during the Festival international de Jazz de Montréal.

Over the years, the program has become one of North America's most ambitious international-affairs summer school programs. Each school is given by a dozen experts in the field.

Subjects in 2009:

From June 29 to July 4:

The Obama Presidency: Year One

India: Surprising Modernity

Pluralism and Radicalization in the Arab-Muslim World

International and European Environmental Law/Climate Change

From July 6 to 11:

Biodiversity: current situation, challenges and management issues

China Risen: How it is Changing, and Changing Us

Understanding and Preventing Terrorism

Peace Operations: Manufacturing Peace

For further information and a short video
