= List of ambassadors of Canada to Mexico =

Ambassador of Canada to Mexico
- Incumbent; Cameron MacKay since November 5, 2024
- Seat: Embassy of Canada, Mexico City
- Nominator: Prime Minister of Canada
- Appointer: Governor General of Canada
- Term length: At His Majesty's pleasure
- Inaugural holder: William Ferdinand Alphonse Turgeon
- Formation: March 3, 1944

The ambassador of Canada to Mexico is the official representative of the Canadian government to the government of Mexico. The official title for the ambassador is Ambassador Extraordinary and Plenipotentiary of Canada to the United Mexican States. The ambassador of Canada to Mexico is Cameron MacKay who was appointed on the advice of Prime Minister Justin Trudeau on November 5, 2024.

The Embassy of Canada is located at Calle Schiller No. 529, Colonia Polanco, 11580 México, D.F., México.

== History of diplomatic relations ==
Diplomatic relations between Canada and Mexico were established on January 30, 1944, with the first ambassador, William Ferdinand Alphonse Turgeon, appointed on the advice of Prime Minister W. L. Mackenzie King on March 3, 1944.

== List of ambassadors of Canada to Mexico ==
No.	Name	Term of office			Career	Prime Minister nominated by	Ref.
No.	Name	Start Date	PoC.	End Date	Career	Prime Minister nominated by	Ref.
1	William Ferdinand Alphonse Turgeon	March 3, 1944	April 27, 1944	August 15, 1944	Non-Career	W. L. Mackenzie King (1935–1948)	
2	Hugh Llewellyn Keenleyside	November 22, 1944	February 15, 1945	March 1947	Career	W. L. Mackenzie King (1935–1948)	
3	Sydney David Pierce	May 20, 1947	July 17, 1947	January 28, 1949	Career	W. L. Mackenzie King (1935–1948)	
4	Charles Pierre Hébert	January 12, 1949	February 24, 1949	1953	Career	Louis St. Laurent (1948–1957)	
5	Jules Léger	October 14, 1953		July 8, 1954	Career	Louis St. Laurent (1948–1957)	
6	Douglas Seaman Cole	November 18, 1954	December 8, 1954		Career	Louis St. Laurent (1948–1957)	
–	Lionel Victor Joseph Roy (Chargé d'Affaires)	July 1958		February 1960	Career	John G. Diefenbaker (1957–1963)	
–	Edward Ritchie Bellemare (Chargé d'Affaires)	January 28, 1960		1961	Career	John G. Diefenbaker (1957–1963)	
7	William Arthur Irwin	March 9, 1960	April 4, 1960	May 6, 1964	Non-Career	John G. Diefenbaker (1957–1963)	
8	Herbert Frederick Brooks-Hill Feaver	March 26, 1964	August 12, 1964	May 4, 1967	Career	Lester B. Pearson (1963–1968)	
9	Saul Forbes Rae	April 19, 1967	September 12, 1967	June 25, 1972	Career	Lester B. Pearson (1963–1968)	
10	Maurice Schwarzmann	April 22, 1972	June 25, 1972	September 27, 1975	Career	Pierre Elliott Trudeau (1968–1979 & 1980–1984)	
11	James Coningsby Langley	October 21, 1975		June 1, 1979	Career	Pierre Elliott Trudeau (1968–1979 & 1980–1984)	
12	Claude Talbot Charland	April 4, 1979	August 9, 1979	February 14, 1982	Career	Pierre Elliott Trudeau (1968–1979 & 1980–1984)	
13	James Russell McKinney	February 18, 1982	March 24, 1982	June 28, 1985	Career	Pierre Elliott Trudeau (1968–1979 & 1980–1984)	
14	Raymond A.J. Chrétien	July 5, 1985	September 9, 1985	October 29, 1988	Career	Brian Mulroney (1984–1993)	
–	James Darrell Leach (Chargé d'Affaires)	October 29, 1988		October 17, 1989	Career	Brian Mulroney (1984–1993)	
15	David John Sydney Winfield	September 28, 1989	October 18, 1989		Career	Brian Mulroney (1984–1993)	
16	Marc Perron	July 4, 1995			Career	Jean Chrétien (1993–2003)	
17	Stanley Edward Gooch	October 29, 1997		April 29, 2000	Career	Jean Chrétien (1993–2003)	
18	Keith H. Christie	June 26, 2000	July 26, 2000		Career	Jean Chrétien (1993–2003)	
19	Gaëtan Lavertu	July 15, 2003	September 4, 2003		Career	Jean Chrétien (1993–2003)	
–	Robert Langlois (Consul General)	May 19, 2004				Paul Martin (2003–2006)	
20	Guillermo Rishchynski	August 31, 2007	October 24, 2007	July 29, 2011	Career	Stephen Harper (2006–2015)	
21	Sara Hradecky	October 4, 2011	February 24, 2012	March 31, 2015	Career	Stephen Harper (2006–2015)	
22	Pierre Alarie	February 24, 2015	June 19, 2015	August 16, 2019	Career	Stephen Harper (2006–2015)	
23	Graeme C. Clark	August 26, 2019	September 22, 2019		Career	Justin Trudeau (2015–Present)	
24	Cameron MacKay	November 5, 2024			Career	Justin Trudeau (2015–Present)	

== See also ==
- Canada–Mexico relations
