= List of ambassadors of Canada to Brazil =

Ambassador of Canada to Brazil
- Incumbent; Eric Walsh since April 24, 2026
- Seat: Embassy of Canada, Brasília
- Nominator: Prime Minister of Canada
- Appointer: Governor General of Canada
- Term length: At His Majesty's pleasure
- Inaugural holder: Jean Désy
- Formation: June 24, 1941

The Ambassador of Canada to Brazil is the official representative of the Canadian government to the government of Brazil. The official title for the ambassador is Ambassador Extraordinary and Plenipotentiary of Canada to the Federative Republic of Brazil.

The Embassy of Canada is located at SES - Av. das Nações, Quadra 803, Lote 16, 70410-900 Brasília, DF, Brazil.

== History of diplomatic relations ==
Diplomatic relations between Canada and Brazil were established on November 14, 1940. Jean Désy was appointed as Canada's first Envoy to Brazil on June 24, 1941, and made ambassador when the legation was raised in 1944.

== Head of mission ==
No.	Name	Term of office			Career	Prime Minister nominated by	Ref.
No.	Name	Start Date	PoC.	End Date	Career	Prime Minister nominated by	Ref.
1	Jean Désy	June 24, 1941	September 30, 1941	September 11, 1947	Career	W. L. Mackenzie King (1935-1948)	
–	Evan Benjamin Rogers (Chargé d'Affaires)	September 12, 1947		June 3, 1948	Career	W. L. Mackenzie King (1935-1948)	
2	James Scott Macdonald	May 4, 1948	June 3, 1948	July 1951	Career	W. L. Mackenzie King (1935-1948)	
3	Ephraim Herbert Coleman	October 9, 1951	December 4, 1951		Non-Career	Louis St. Laurent (1948-1957)	
4	Sydney David Pierce	July 6, 1953	October 27, 1953	March 22, 1956	Career	Louis St. Laurent (1948-1957)	
–	Fulgence Charpentier (Chargé d'Affaires)	May 26, 1956		February 18, 1957	Career	Louis St. Laurent (1948-1957)	
5	William Arthur Irwin	January 10, 1957	February 18, 1957		Non-Career	Louis St. Laurent (1948-1957)	
6	Jean Chapdelaine	August 6, 1959	September 26, 1959	October 26, 1963	Career	John G. Diefenbaker (1957-1963)	
7	Paul André Beaulieu	October 24, 1963	February 24, 1964	June 8, 1967	Career	Lester B. Pearson (1963-1968)	
8	Joseph Charles Léonard Yvon Beaulne	August 2, 1967	October 2, 1967	February 25, 1969	Career	Lester B. Pearson (1963-1968)	
–	Clive Edward Glover (Chargé d'Affaires)	February 28, 1969		November 12, 1969	Career	Lester B. Pearson (1963-1968)	
9	Christian Hardy	July 15, 1969	November 12, 1969	July 25, 1971	Career	Pierre Elliott Trudeau (1968-1979)	
10	Barry Connell Steers	July 25, 1971	August 30, 1971	October 2, 1976	Career	Pierre Elliott Trudeau (1968-1979)	
11	James Howard Stone	July 20, 1976	December 6, 1976	July 5, 1979	Career	Pierre Elliott Trudeau (1968-1979)	
12	Ronald Stuart MacLean	April 4, 1979	September 18, 1979	July 21, 1983	Career	Pierre Elliott Trudeau (1968-1979)	
13	Anthony Tudor Eyton	October 13, 1983	September 27, 1983	August 27, 1986	Career	Pierre Elliott Trudeau (1968-1979)	
14	John Peter Bell	March 26, 1987	May 9, 1987	September 24, 1990	Career	Brian Mulroney (1984-1993)	
15	William L. Clarke	September 12, 1990	November 6, 1990	July 16, 1992	Career	Brian Mulroney (1984-1993)	
16	William A. Dymond	August 27, 1992	September 28, 1992	August 21, 1995	Career	Brian Mulroney (1984-1993)	
17	Nancy M. Stiles	August 18, 1995	September 21, 1995	July 30, 1998	Career	Jean Chrétien (1993-2003)	
18	Richard Kohler	July 15, 1998	November 10, 1998	August 3, 2000	Career	Jean Chrétien (1993-2003)	
19	Jean-Pierre Juneau	June 26, 2000	October 19, 2000	August 11, 2003	Career	Jean Chrétien (1993-2003)	
20	Suzanne Laporte	July 15, 2003	October 9, 2003	August 14, 2005	Career	Jean Chrétien (1993-2003)	
21	Guillermo Rishchynski	August 2, 2005	August 8, 2005	September 2, 2007	Career	Paul Martin (2003-2006)	
22	Paul Hunt	July 31, 2007	February 13, 2008	September 5, 2010	Career	Stephen Harper (2006-2015)	
–	Charles Larabie (Consul General)	July 4, 2008			Career	Stephen Harper (2006-2015)	
23	Jamal Khokhar	August 10, 2010	February 9, 2011		Career	Stephen Harper (2006-2015)	
24	Riccardo Savone	January 22, 2015	August 6, 2015	August 2, 2019	Career	Stephen Harper (2006-2015)	
25	Jennifer May	August 17, 2019	October 3, 2019	July 29, 2022	Career	Justin Trudeau (2015-2025)	
26	Emmanuel Kamarianakis	July 29, 2022	August 29, 2022		Career	Justin Trudeau (2015-2025)	
27	Eric Walsh	April 21, 2026			Career	Mark Carney (2025-Present)	
