= Pierre Alarie =

His Excellency Pierre Alarie
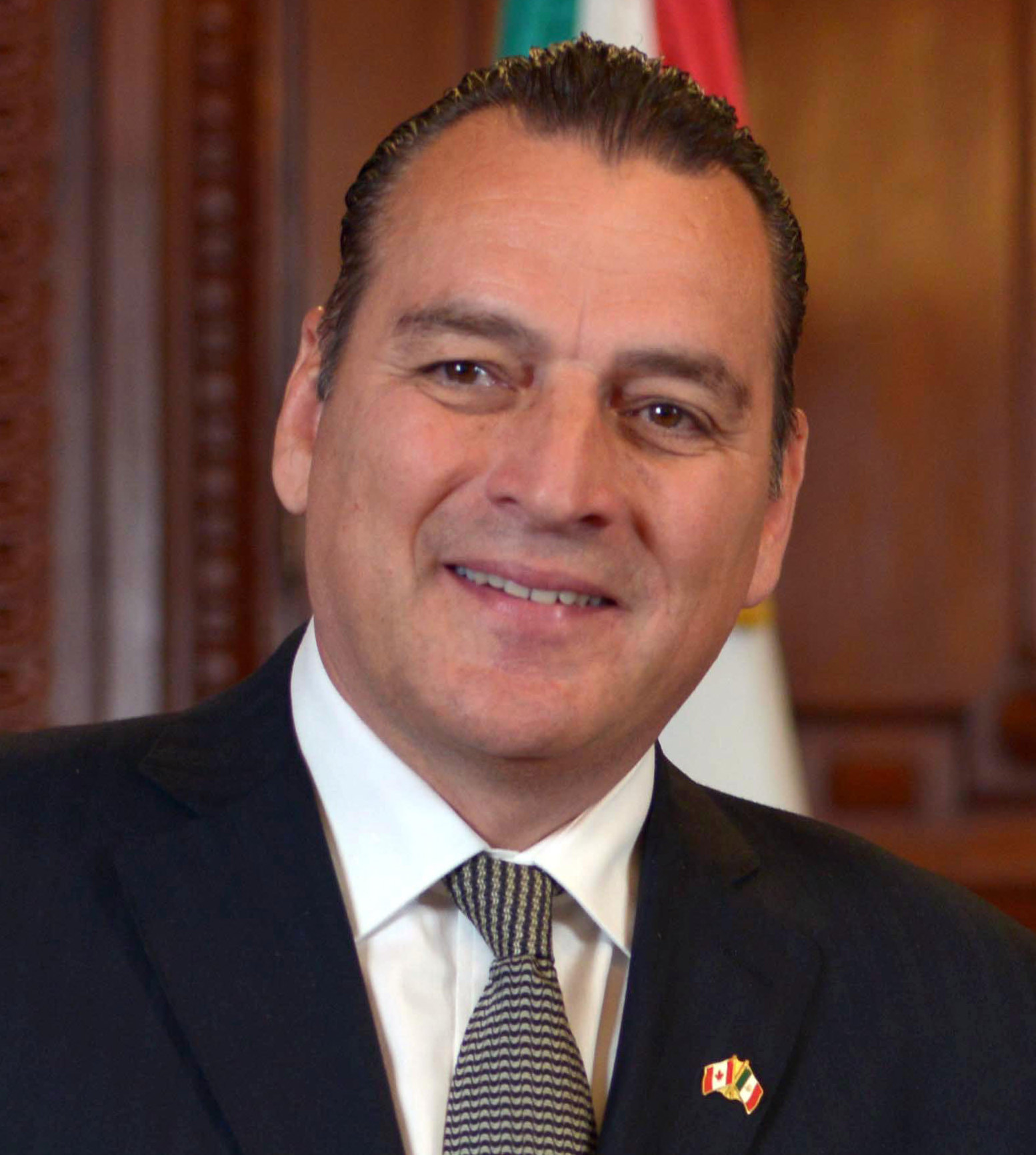

25th Canadian Ambassador to the United States of Mexico
- In office June 19, 2015 – September 18, 2019
- Governors General: David Johnston; Julie Payette
- Prime Minister: Stephen Harper; Justin Trudeau
- Preceded by: Sara Hradecky
- Succeeded by: Graeme Clark

Pierre Alarie was the Canadian Ambassador to Mexico, appointed on March 4, 2015, arriving in Mexico in April 2015. He replaced the former Ambassador Sara Hradecky.

Alarie joined the Department of External Affairs in 1982. While in Ottawa, he served as a trade desk officer with the European bureau. He served abroad as first secretary in Santiago, Chile.

After his assignment in Chile, Alarie joined the private sector. Between 1991 and 1993, Alarie was vice-president, business development of Bombardier's transportation group, and in 1994 he became vice-president, business development, for SNC-Lavalin International in Mexico City. Subsequently, Alarie was the managing director, Latin America, for the real estate subsidiary of the Caisse de Dépôt et Placement du Québec. In 1998, he joined the Bank of Nova Scotia as country representative in Mexico City, a position he held until 2004. In 2004 and 2005, Alarie was director, mergers and acquisitions, with Hydro-Québec International. Between 2006 and 2009 he acted as adviser for several Canadian companies including Brookfield Renewable Energy Group, a manager of renewable energy power platforms.

In 2009, Alarie became vice president, business development and sales, of the Canadian Commercial Corporation in Ottawa, a federal Crown corporation mandated to facilitate international trade on behalf of Canadian industry, particularly within government markets.

Alarie obtained a master's degree in Public Administration at the College of Europe, Bruges, 1982, and is a certified corporate director and a certified administrator.

In his current position, he works to facilitate relations between Canada and Mexico across sectors such as aerospace, auto and mining industries.

== Education ==
Alarie obtained a master's degree in Public Administration at the College of Europe, Bruges, 1982.

== Personal life ==
He is currently in Mexico with his wife Catherine Genois. He has three children, Philippe, Jack Santiago and Éloïse.
