= Jennifer May Loten =

Canadian diplomat

Jennifer May Alice Loten
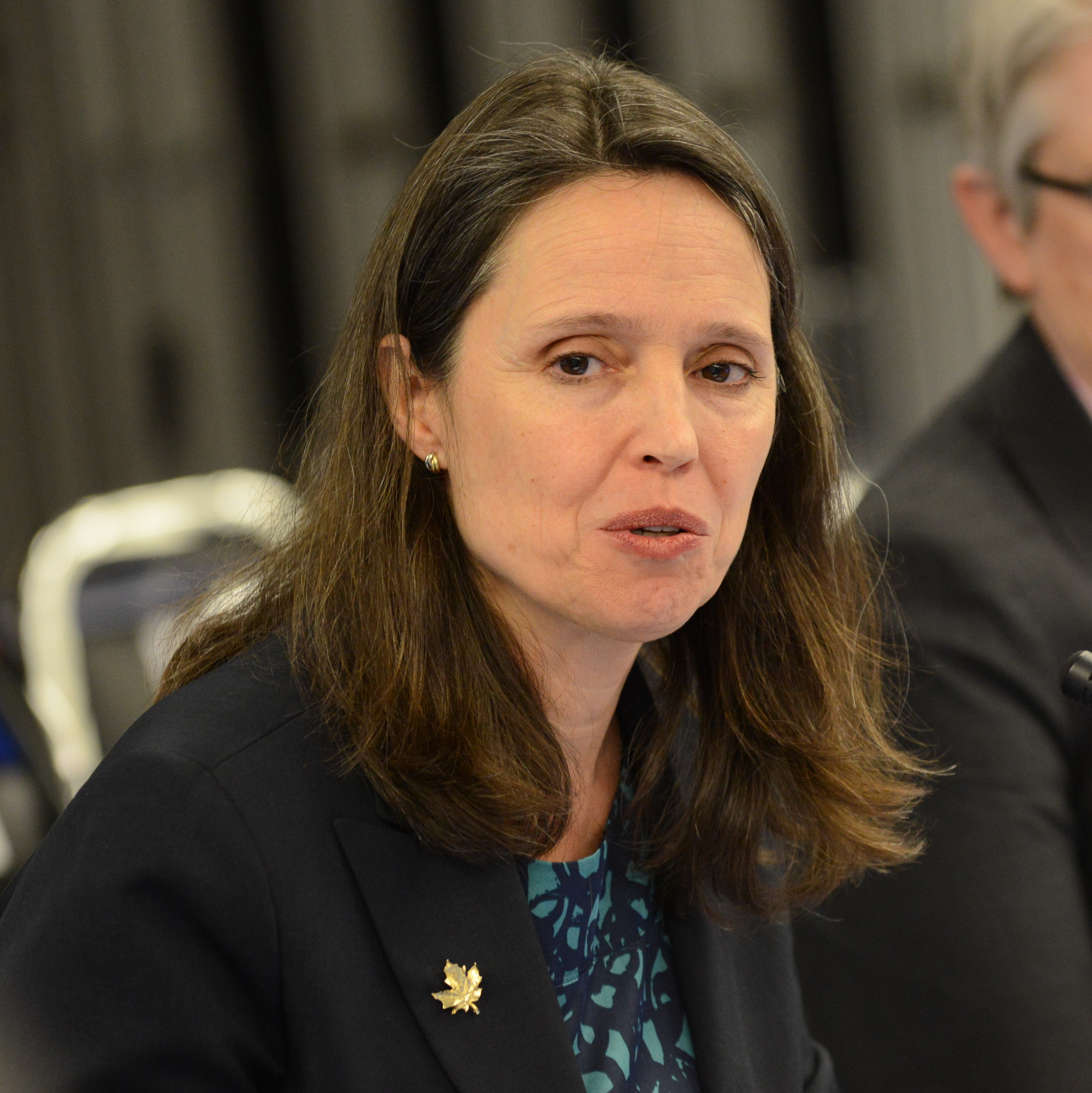
- Occupation: diplomat

Jennifer May Alice Loten is a Canadian diplomat who served as the Canadian Ambassador and Permanent Representative to the OAS from September 2, 2015, until 2019. On October 4, 2017, Loten became the chair of the Organization of American States Permanent Council, succeeding José Luiz Machado e Costa of Brazil. Her term was to last until December 2017.

In January 2019, Loten announced that Canada does not recognize the legitimacy of the Venezuelan government under Nicolás Maduro’s second term, Canada would recognize the authority of Juan Guaidó.
