= Alix Cléo Roubaud =

Canadian photographer and writer

- Born: Alix Cléo Blanchette; January 19, 1952; Mexico City, Mexico
- Died: January 28, 1983 (aged 31); Paris, France
- Known for: Photography
- Spouse: Jacques Roubaud (m. 1980)

Alix Cléo Roubaud (January 19, 1952 – January 28, 1983) was a Canadian photographer and writer.

== Biography ==
Alix Cléo Blanchette was born in Mexico, January 19, 1952. She was the daughter of Arthur Edward Blanchette, a diplomat, and Marcelle Montreuil, an artist. She studied architecture and psychology at the University of Ottawa. In 1972, she moved to Aix-en-Provence, France, where she pursued studies in philosophy. The move to France was also intended to help with her asthma. She began studies at Paris 8 University in 1975. In 1978, she began visiting the spa town of La Bourboule each year to aid her health. In 1979, she abandoned her studies to concentrate on her photography.

In 1980, she married Jacques Roubaud, a French poet and academic.

Jean Eustache produced the 1980 film Les Photos d'Alix based on her photographs.

== Death and legacy ==
Roubaud died in Paris of a pulmonary embolism at the age of 31.

She had maintained a personal journal over her career and, in 1984, her husband decided to publish it.

In 2014, the Bibliothèque nationale de France presented a retrospective of her work, Quinze minutes la nuit au rythme de la respiration.
