= List of ambassadors of Canada to Venezuela =

The following is a list of Canadian ambassadors to Venezuela. The embassy closed in 2019 and consular services are to be handled in Colombia.

Head Of Post	Title	Career	Appointment Date	Presentation of credentials	Termination of mission
Norman, Henry Gordon	AE&P	NC	1952/10/30	1953/01/15	1955/06/00
Brown, Harry Leslie	Chargé d'Affaires a.i.	C	1955/06/00		1956/04/26
Bower, Richard Plant	AE&P	C	1956/01/11	1956/04/26	1958/09/22
Couillard, Joseph Louis Eugène	AE&P	C	1958/10/22	1958/12/29	1961/06/14
Ross, Andrew Donald	Chargé d'Affaires a.i.	C	1961/06/14		1962/02/00
Beaulne, Joseph Charles Léonard Yvon	AE&P	C	1961/12/00	1962/02/20	1964/07/08
Rankin, Bruce Irving	AE&P	C	1964/07/09	1964/09/16	1970/07/27
McPhail, Donald Sutherland	AE&P	C	1970/05/29	1970/09/11	1972/08/00
Van Tighem, Clarence Joseph	AE&P	C	1972/04/22	1972/10/02	1975/08/15
Schwarzmann, Maurice	AE&P	C	1975/07/17		1977/03/01
Rousseau, Charles Odilon Roger	AE&P	C	1977/05/12	1977/06/13	1981/07/14
Johnston, Peter Arthur Edward	AE&P	C	1981/07/29	1981/11/13
Midwinter, James Robert	AE&P	C	1983/10/13	1983/12/09	1985/09/27
Lotto, Victor George	AE&P	C	1985/06/27	1985/11/06	1988/08/23
Graham, John Ware	AE&P	C	1988/08/17	1988/10/11	1992/09/15
Davidson, Russell H.	AE&P	C	1992/08/27	1992/09/22	1995/09/01
Gagnon, Yves	AE&P	C	1995/07/04		1998/08/08
Stewart, Allan	AE&P	C	1998/07/15
Russell, Colin	AE&P	C	2001/07/16
Culham, Allan	AE&P	C	2002/07/02
Wielgosz, Renata	AE&P	C	2005/08/19	2006/03/15
Calderwood, Perry	AE&P	C	2007/10/18
Gibbard, Paul	AE&P	C	2010/08/10		2013/08/31
Rowswell, Ben	AE&P	C	2014/02/28	2015/05/10	2017/07/29
Kowalik, Craig	Chargé d'Affaires a.i.	C	2017/07/30
