= Gaëtan Lavertu =

22nd Canadian Ambassador to the United States of Mexico
- In office 2003–2007
- Governors General: Adrienne Clarkson; Michaëlle Jean
- Prime Minister: Paul Martin; Stephen Harper
- Preceded by: Keith Christie
- Succeeded by: Guillermo Rishchynski

Gaëtan Lavertu is a Canadian retired diplomat.

Lavertu held positions at all levels of Canada's Department of Foreign Affairs and International Trade, including director general of foreign intelligence, assistant deputy minister for political affairs and international security, associate deputy minister and finally as deputy minister. He held a number of diplomatic posts abroad, several with the rank of ambassador, including Colombia, Venezuela and Ecuador, and finally as ambassador to Mexico, where he served from 2003 to 2007.

In his previous roles in Ottawa, Lavertu held a number of positions at the Department of Foreign Affairs and International Trade, including in the United Nations Division in 1969; the NATO and NORAD Division in 1970; the Personnel Division from 1970 to 1971; and the Federal-Provincial Relations Division from 1975 to 1976. After being executive assistant to the deputy minister (political affairs) in 1982–83, Lavertu became director of intelligence analysis, and from 1985 to 1987, director general, Foreign Intelligence Bureau. In 1992, he was named to the position of assistant deputy minister, political and international security affairs, and in 1994, to that of associate deputy minister of foreign affairs. He served as deputy minister of foreign affairs from 2000 to 2003.

He holds master's degrees in international relations, business administration and public administration.

Lavertu retired from the Foreign Service in 2008.
