= List of ambassadors of Canada to Albania =

Ambassador of Canada to Albania
- Incumbent; Elissa Golberg since December 20, 2021
- Seat: Embassy of Canada, Italy
- Nominator: Prime Minister of Canada
- Appointer: Governor General of Canada
- Term length: At His Majesty's pleasure
- Inaugural holder: Terence Charles Bacon
- Formation: October 15, 1987

The Ambassador of Canada to Albania is the official representative of the Canadian government to the government of Albania. The official title for the ambassador is Ambassador Extraordinary and Plenipotentiary of Canada to the Republic of Albania. The current ambassador of Canada is Elissa Golberg who was appointed on the advice of Prime Minister Justin Trudeau on December 20, 2021.

The Consulate of Canada is located at Rr. Ibrahim Rugova; Nd 42, K 5; H7, Albania.

== History of diplomatic relations ==
Diplomatic recognition between Canada and Albania was established on March 22, 1965 with no public announcement, and relations were established on September 10, 1987. Terence Charles Bacon was appointed as Canada's first ambassador to Albania on October 15, 1987. Canada established an official government office in Albania on November 17, 1999.

== Head of mission ==
No.	Name	Term of office			Career	Prime Minister nominated by	Ref.
No.	Name	Start Date	PoC.	End Date	Career	Prime Minister nominated by	Ref.
1	Terence Charles Bacon	October 15, 1987	April 8, 1988	October 3, 1990	Career	Brian Mulroney (1984-1993)	(Note: On 16 October 1987, it was announced that Mr. Bacon, Ambassador designate to Yugoslavia and Bulgaria, would become Canada's first Ambassador to Albania, resident in Yugoslavia.)
2	James Byron Bissett	September 12, 1990		September 13, 1992	Career	Brian Mulroney (1984-1993)	
3	Rodney Irwin	December 17, 1992		August 1996	Career	Brian Mulroney (1984-1993)	(Note: Mr. Irwin's appointment marked the change in residency of the Canadian Ambassador from Yugoslavia to Hungary. As Ambassador to Hungary, he was concurrently accredited as Ambassador to Albania, resident in Hungary.)
4	Susan M.W. Cartwright	September 11, 1996	November 4, 1996	August 21, 1999	Career	Jean Chrétien (1993-2003)	
5	Jeremy K.B. Kinsman	March 19, 1999	April 15, 1999	October 12, 2000	Career	Jean Chrétien (1993-2003)	(Note: Mr. Kinsman's appointment marked the change in residency of the Canadian Ambassador from Hungary to Italy. As Ambassador to Italy, he was concurrently accredited as Ambassador to Albania, resident in Rome.)
6	Robert Fowler	January 30, 2001		August 11, 2006	Career	Jean Chrétien (1993-2003)	
7	Alexander Himelfarb	August 14, 2006	October 31, 2006	April 17, 2009	Career	Stephen Harper (2006-2015)	
8	James Fox	September 30, 2009	October 12, 2009	August 20, 2013	Career	Stephen Harper (2006-2015)	
9	Peter McGovern	August 16, 2013	January 13, 2014	August 10, 2017	Career	Stephen Harper (2006-2015)	
10	Alexandra Bugailiskis	October 25, 2017	February 6, 2018	November 17, 2021	Career	Justin Trudeau (2015-Present)	
11	Elissa Golberg	December 20, 2021	March 17, 2022	Present	Career	Justin Trudeau (2015-Present)	
