= Stefanie Beck =

Canadian ambassador

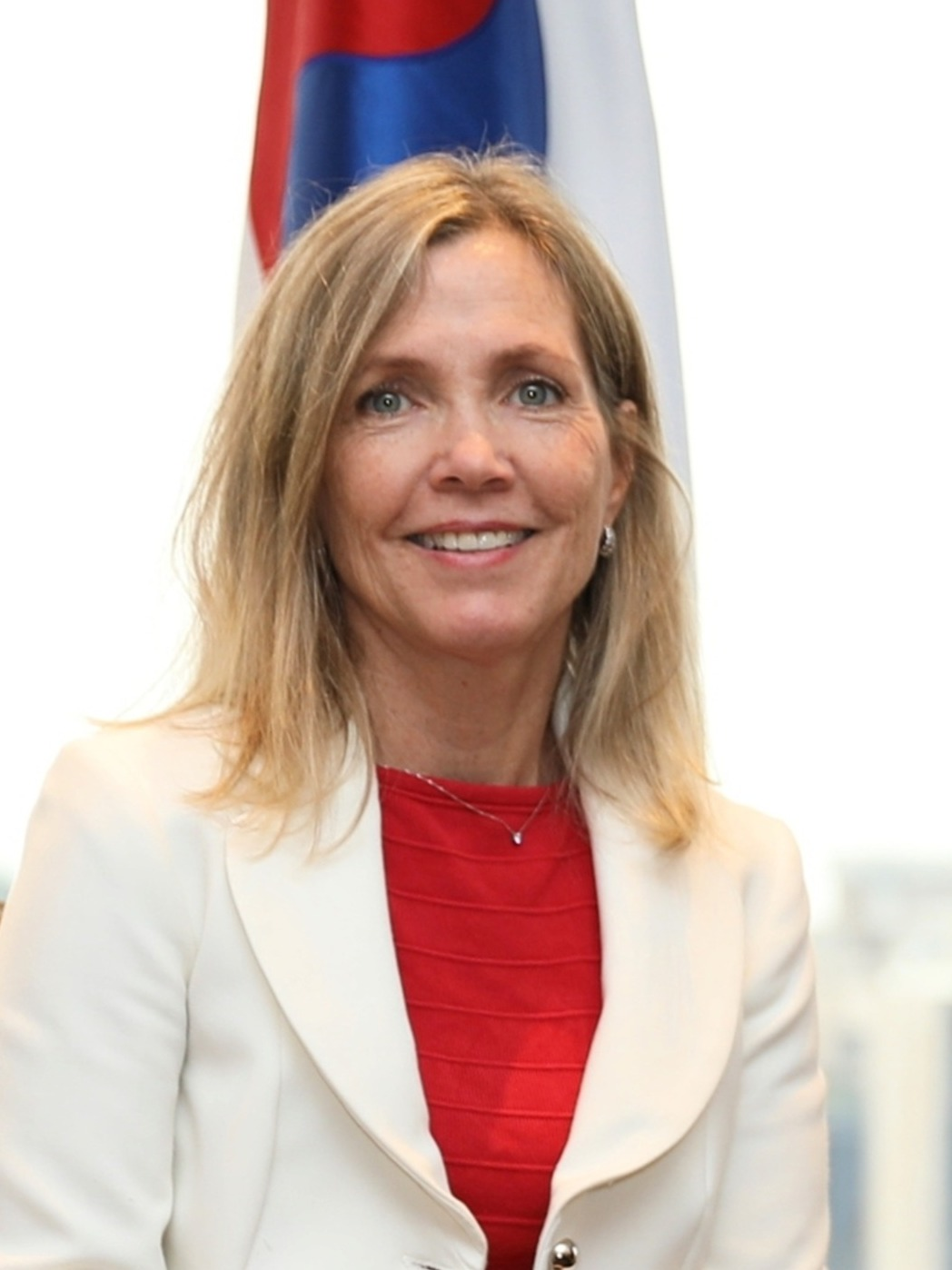

Deputy Minister of National Defence
- In office June 3, 2024 – January 28,2026
- Preceded by: Bill Matthews
- Succeeded by: Christiane Fox

Deputy Minister of Agriculture and Agri-Food Canada
- In office February 20, 2023 – June 2, 2024
- Preceded by: Chris Forbes
- Succeeded by: Lawrence Hanson

Associate Deputy Minister of National Defence
- In office January 31, 2022 – February 19, 2023
- Preceded by: Nancy Chawan
- Succeeded by: Natasha Kim

Deputy High Commissioner of Canada to the United Kingdom
- In office October 2020 – January 30, 2022
- Preceded by: Sarah Fountain-Smith
- Succeeded by: Robert Fry

Canadian Ambassador to Croatia
- In office 2004–2006
- Preceded by: Donald W. Smith
- Succeeded by: Thomas Marr

Canadian Ambassador to Cambodia
- In office 2002–2004
- Preceded by: Normand Mailhot
- Succeeded by: Donica Pottie

Personal details
- Children: 2
- Education: McGill University
- Occupation: Civil servant

Stefanie Beck is a retired Canadian public servant and diplomat who served as the deputy minister for the Department of National Defence from 2024 to 2026. Beck was previously the deputy minister for Agriculture and Agri-Food Canada from 2023 to 2024. She was the Canadian ambassador to Croatia from 2004 to 2006, Cambodia from 2003 to 2004 and deputy high commissioner to the United Kingdom from 2020 to 2022.

== Education and career ==
Beck has a bachelor's degree in German and Italian from McGill University, graduating in 1987.

=== Public service foreign service career ===
She joined the Department of External Affairs in 1990. She worked as a political officer in Dakar, Senegal, and Canberra, Australia. As a result of her appointment as the Ambassador to Cambodia, she became the then-youngest woman ambassador of Canada, serving from 2002 to 2004 and subsequently as Ambassador to Croatia from 2004 to 2006.

Upon her return to Ottawa in August 2006, she became the director of security and defence relations. Later she was the senior departmental adviser to the minister of foreign affairs from September 2007 to September 2008. She became a director-general in 2008, leading the Foreign Service Directives Services and Policy Bureau until 2010 and the Client Relations and Mission Operations until 2013, when she became acting assistant deputy minister (ADM) for the International Platform Branch.

=== Senior public service roles ===
In 2013, Beck became the ADM for corporate services at Immigration, Refugees and Citizenship Canada. She returned to Global Affairs Canada (GAC) in 2017 as the ADM for Europe, Circumpolar Affairs, Middle East and Maghreb. In 2018, she joined the Privy Council Office as the assistant secretary to the Cabinet for priorities and planning, eventually returning to GAC as the deputy high commissioner for Canada in the United Kingdom in 2020. In early 2021, she served as the acting high commissioner after Janice Charette left the post to serve as interim clerk of the Privy Council.

Beck joined the Department of National Defence in 2022, when she became associate deputy minister. She became a deputy minister in 2023, when she was named as the most senior public servant in Agriculture and Agri-Food Canada. She became the deputy minister of National Defence in 2024.

== Awards ==
- In 2015, Beck received the Deputy Minister's Award for Operation Syrian Refugees.
- In 2009, Beck received the Public Service Award of Excellence for Afghanistan.
