= Matthew Levin (diplomat) =

Canadian diplomat

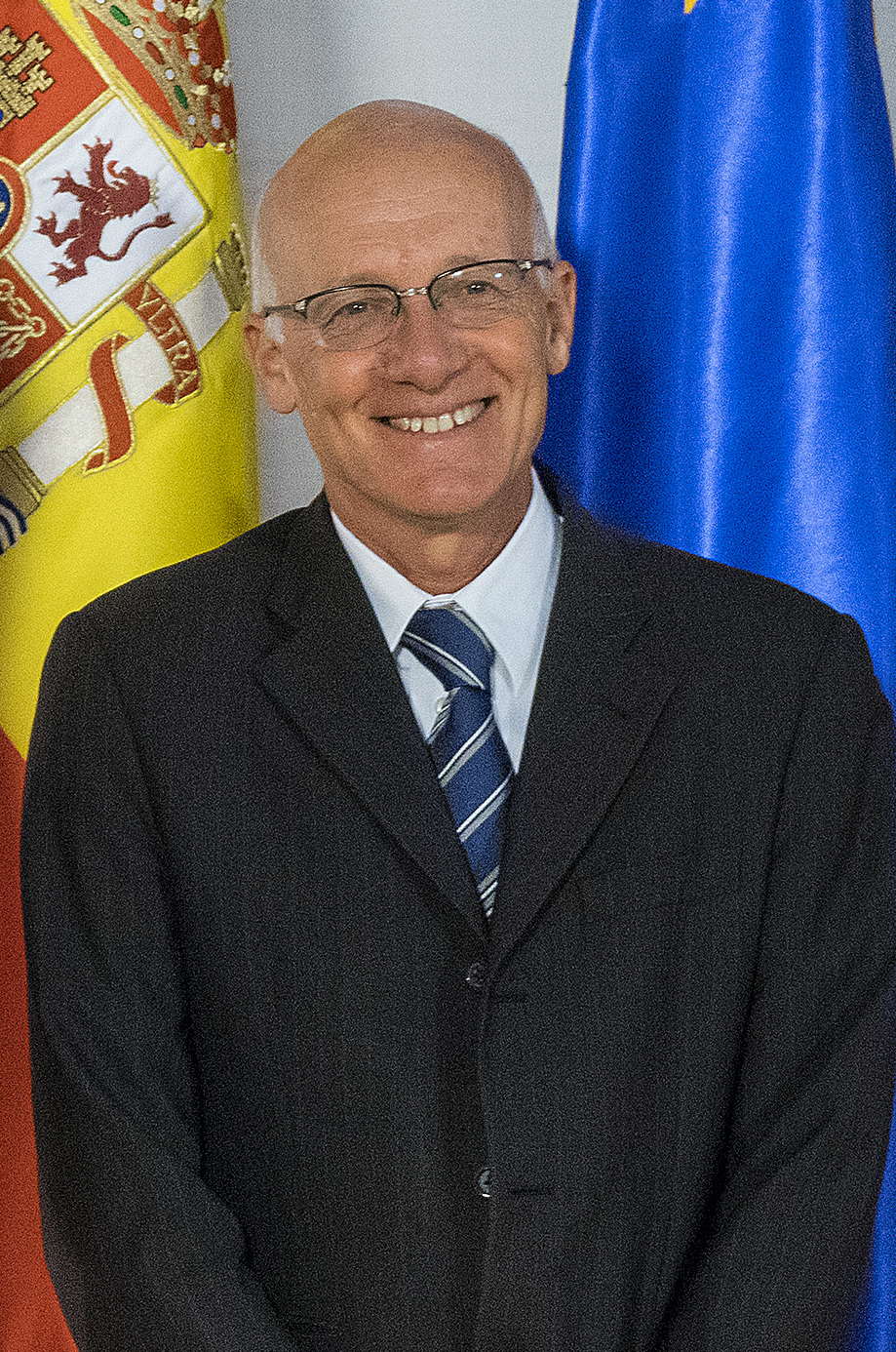
Levin in 2017

Matthew Levin (born 1952) is a Canadian diplomat and trade representative. He served as ambassador of Canada to Colombia from 2005 to 2008, to Cuba from 2010 to 2013 and to Spain from 2016.

He is an advisor at the Institute for Peace and Diplomacy in Canada.

Diplomatic posts
Preceded by Jean-Pierre Juneau	Canadian Ambassador to Cuba; 2010-2013	Succeeded by Yves Gagnon
Preceded by Jon Allen	Canadian Ambassador to Spain; 2016-	Succeeded by Incumbent
