= Eric Walsh (ambassador) =

Canadian diplomat

His Excellency Eric Walsh
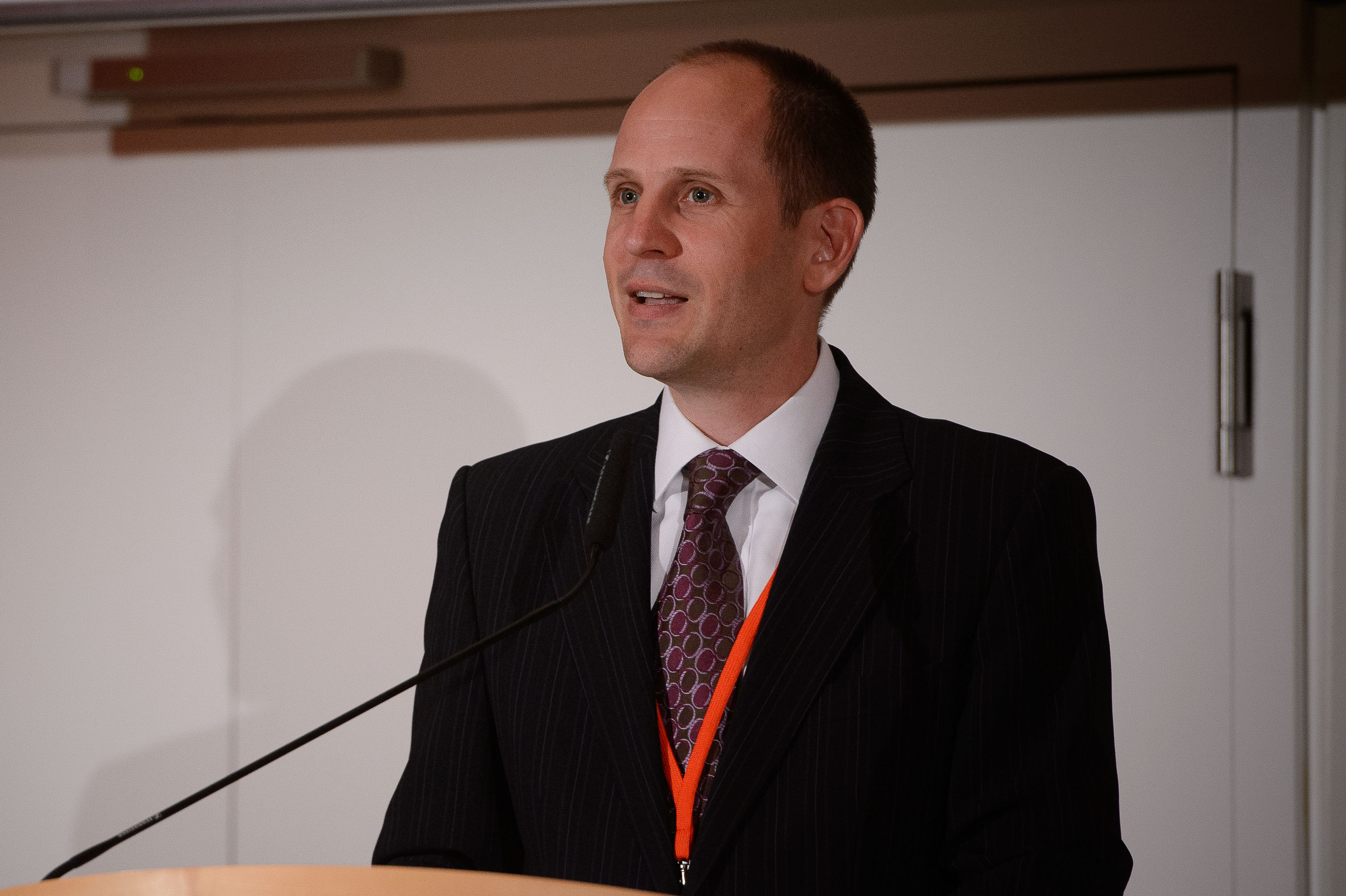

Ambassador of Canada to Brazil
- Incumbent
- Assumed office April 24, 2026
- Prime Minister: Mark Carney
- Preceded by: Emmanuel Kamarianakis

Eric Walsh (born 1972) is a Canadian diplomat who currently serves as the ambassador to Brazil. Previously, he served as the Canadian High Commissioner in Sri Lanka and the Maldives from November 2022 to 2026, and Ambassador of Canada to South Korea between February 2015 and September 2018.

He was born in London, Ontario and grew up in Toronto.

== Offshore assignments ==
Walsh has been a diplomat since 1995. Before he was named ambassador to South Korea, he had assignments in Turkey, Romania, and Switzerland as Deputy Permanent Representative to the Conference on Disarmament, and Germany as Deputy Head of Mission under Ambassador Peter Boehm. Following his time abroad, Walsh returned to Ottawa as Director General of the Canada-U.S. relations branch at Global Affairs Canada (GAC). His time at GAC corresponded with several important developments in the Canada-U.S. relationship, including the first presidency of Donald Trump and the re-negotiation of the Canada-U.S.-Mexico Agreement (CUSMA).

== Education ==
Walsh is a graduate of political science from McGill University in Montreal.
