= Pierre Dupuy (diplomat) =

Canadian diplomat and writer

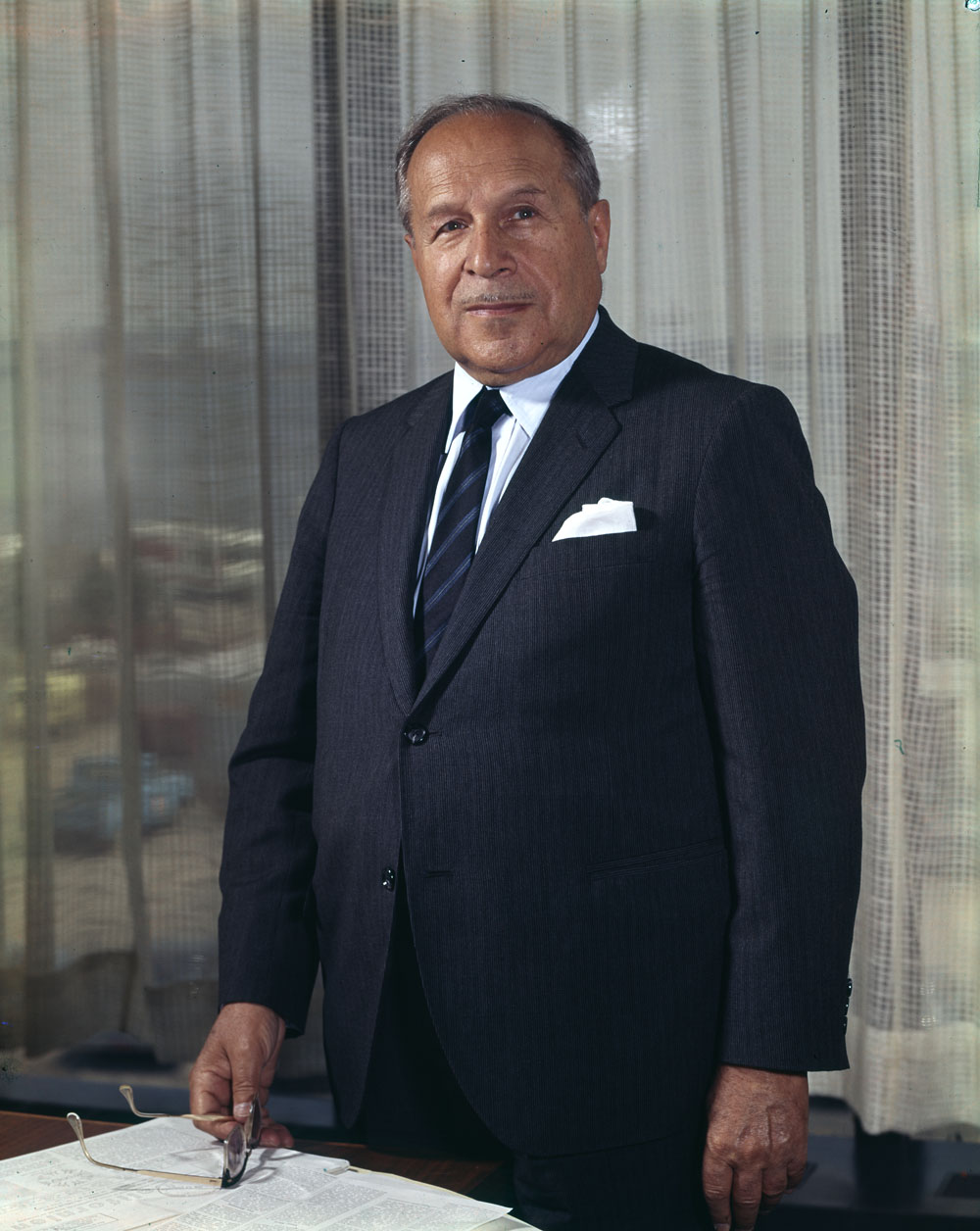
- Dupuy c. 1966

Commissioner General Expo 67
- In office 1963–1968
- Preceded by: Paul Bienvenue
- Succeeded by: none
- Constituency: Expo 67

Canadian Ambassador to France
- In office 1958–1963
- Preceded by: Jean Désy
- Succeeded by: Jules Léger

Canadian Ambassador to Italy
- In office 1952–1958
- Preceded by: Jean Désy
- Succeeded by: Léon Mayrand

Personal details
- Born: July 9, 1896 Montreal, Quebec, Canada
- Died: May 21, 1969 (aged 72) Cannes, France
- Spouse: Therese Ferron (m. 1921)
- Children: Michel, Jacqueline
- Education: Université de Montréal; Sorbonne
- Occupation: Diplomat

Pierre Dupuy, CC, CMG (French pronunciation: [pjɛʁ dypɥi]; July 9, 1896 – May 21, 1969) was a Canadian diplomat and writer. His most noted achievement was as the Commissioner General of Expo 67.

== Early life ==
Dupuy was born in Montreal, Quebec in 1896. He studied law and international law at the Université de Montréal and at the Sorbonne in Paris.

== Diplomatic career ==
In 1922 he joined the department of External Affairs, working in Paris as secretary for the office of the then Canadian Commissioner General. When, in 1928, that office became a formal legation, he was promoted to second secretary and then, in 1938, to first secretary.

During World War II, Canada, unlike Britain, did not break off its diplomatic relations with the Vichy regime in France. The ambassador, Georges Vanier, fled to London, but technically he was still accredited with the French government. Dupuy became the chargé d'affaires for the Canadian legations for France, Belgium and the Netherlands. On 2 November 1940, the British Foreign Secretary, Lord Halifax, asked the Canadian government to allow Dupuy to visit Vichy so as to "make an informal report on [the] present situation [there] which would be of considerable value". Mackenzie King, the Canadian prime minister, quickly agreed "in the hope that such a visit would aid in some measure in throwing light on the present uncertainty and in establishing more friendly relations between the Government of France and the British Commonwealth".

Dupuy thus visited France three times between November 1940 and August 1941, and reported back to the Allies. He stayed on even after his superior, General Vanier, resigned, in May 1941, as minister to France out of "his increasing disgust with the Vichy regime". British Prime Minister Winston Churchill noted that he was deeply grateful for Dupuy's "magnificent work", adding that "the Canadian channel is invaluable and indeed, at the moment, our only line." However, on November 9, 1942, after the Allied landings in North Africa, Canada finally severed relations with Vichy. Dupuy nevertheless stayed in London to represent Canada's interests with the Allied governments-in-exile. He was appointed a Companion of the Order of St Michael and St George in 1943.

In September 1944, he accompanied the Belgian government on its return to Brussels and, in January 1945, he was appointed minister to the Netherlands, where he served until 1952. He then became Canada's ambassador to Italy until finally, in 1958, he was named ambassador to France, where he served until his retirement in 1963.

In 1963, he was named Commissioner General of Expo 67. He was responsible for getting foreign nations to participate in the Expo. On April 27, 1967, Expo 67 opened on time and with the largest number of foreign nations participating in a World's Fair to that time: a testament to his persistence and skill as a diplomat and manager. Dupuy wrote a poem that was read at the opening by Laurence Olivier and Jean-Louis Barrault.

On December 22, 1967 he was appointed to the Order of Canada, being invested on April 24, 1968 as a companion of the order. In 1967, he received an honorary doctorate from Sir George Williams University, which later became Concordia University.

== Personal life ==
Dupuy married Therese Ferron in 1921. They had two children, Michel who also became a Canadian diplomat, and Jacqueline who became an author. Dupuy owned a home on the Riviera coast of France in Cannes. It was there that Dupuy died of a heart attack on May 21, 1969.
