= List of ambassadors of Canada to Burkina Faso =

Ambassador of Canada to Burkina Faso
- Incumbent; Lee-Anne Hermann since December 20, 2021
- Seat: Embassy of Canada, Burkina Faso
- Nominator: Prime Minister of Canada
- Appointer: Governor General of Canada
- Term length: At His Majesty's pleasure
- Inaugural holder: Bruce MacGillivray Williams
- Formation: April 12, 1962

The ambassador of Canada to Burkina Faso is the official representative of the Canadian government to the government of Burkina Faso. The official title for the ambassador is Ambassador Extraordinary and Plenipotentiary of Canada to Burkina Faso. The current Canadian ambassador is Lee-Anne Hermann who was appointed on the advice of Prime Minister Justin Trudeau on December 20, 2021.

The Embassy of Canada is located at 318 Professeur Joseph KIZERBO avenue, Ouagadougou 01, Burkina Faso.

== History of diplomatic relations ==
Diplomatic relations between Canada and Burkina Faso was established on April 27, 1962. Bruce MacGillivray Williams was appointed as Canada's first Ambassador to Burkina Faso on April 12, 1962.

== List of Canadian ambassadors to Burkina Faso ==
No.	Name	Term of office			Career	Prime Minister nominated by	Ref.
No.	Name	Start Date	PoC.	End Date	Career	Prime Minister nominated by	Ref.
1	Bruce MacGillivray Williams	April 12, 1962		July 1, 1962	Career	John G. Diefenbaker (1957-1963)	
2	Donald Macalister Cornett	November 29, 1962	July 19, 1963	January 7, 1965	Career	John G. Diefenbaker (1957-1963)	
3	Charles Eustace McGaughey	March 30, 1965	August 21, 1965		Career	Lester B. Pearson (1963-1968)	
4	Albert Frederick Hart	August 3, 1966	November 23, 1966	September 13, 1968	Career	Lester B. Pearson (1963-1968)	
5	Douglas Barcham Hicks	October 24, 1968	April 15, 1969	January 6, 1971	Career	Pierre Elliott Trudeau (1980-1984)	
6	Wilfrid Joseph Georges Charpentier	December 17, 1969	April 16, 1970		Career	Pierre Elliott Trudeau (1980-1984)	
7	Gilles Mathieu	April 22, 1972	August 1972		Career	Pierre Elliott Trudeau (1980-1984)	
8	Michel de Goumois	August 6, 1975			Career	Pierre Elliott Trudeau (1980-1984)	
9	Joseph Ernest Gilles Lalande	March 23, 1978	April 27, 1978	June 13, 1980	Non-Career	Pierre Elliott Trudeau (1980-1984)	
10	Ernest Hébert	July 10, 1980			Career	Pierre Elliott Trudeau (1980-1984)	
11	John Peter Bell	December 22, 1983			Career	Pierre Elliott Trudeau (1980-1984)	
12	Jean-Guy Joseph Bernard Saint-Martin	January 14, 1988	January 26, 1988		Career	Brian Mulroney (1984-1993)	
13	J. Denis Bélisle	February 13, 1992	November 4, 1991	June 12, 1994	Career	Brian Mulroney (1984-1993)	
14	Suzanne Laporte	July 15, 1994	November 15, 1994		Career	Jean Chrétien (1993-2003)	
15	Louise Ouimet	August 18, 1995	September 21, 1995		Career	Jean Chrétien (1993-2003)	
16	Jules Savaria	September 22, 1997			Career	Jean Chrétien (1993-2003)	
17	Denis Briand	July 16, 2001			Career	Jean Chrétien (1993-2003)	
18	Louis-Robert Daigle	August 19, 2005			Career	Paul Martin (2003-2006)	
19	Jules Savaria	July 4, 2008			Career	Stephen Harper (2006-2015)	
20	Ivan Roberts	August 8, 2011	October 21, 2011	August 2015	Career	Stephen Harper (2006-2015)	
21	Vincent Le Pape	June 2, 2015	October 20, 2015	August 9, 2017	Career	Stephen Harper (2006-2015)	
22	Edmond Dejon Wega	October 25, 2017	December 6, 2017		Career	Justin Trudeau (2015-Present)	
23	Carol McQueen	August 26, 2019	September 9, 2019		Career	Justin Trudeau (2015-Present)	
24	Lee-Anne Hermann	December 20, 2021	January 11, 2022		Career	Justin Trudeau (2015-Present)	
