= List of high commissioners of Canada to Brunei =

High Commissioner for Canada in Brunei Darussalam
- Incumbent; Tamer Mansy since September 8, 2025
- Seat: High Commission of Canada, Brunei Darussalam
- Nominator: Prime Minister of Canada
- Appointer: Governor General of Canada
- Term length: At His Majesty's pleasure
- Inaugural holder: James Ross Francis
- Formation: November 29, 1979

The High Commissioner of Canada to Brunei Darussalam is the official representative and title of the Canadian government to the government of Brunei. The current high commissioner is Dr Tamer Mansy who was appointed on the advice of Prime Minister Mark Carney on September 5, 2025.

The High Commission of Canada is located at Bandar Seri Begawan, Brunei.

As fellow members of the Commonwealth of Nations, diplomatic relations between Canada and Brunei are at governmental level, rather than between heads of state. Thus, the countries exchange high commissioners, rather than ambassadors.

== History of diplomatic relations ==
Diplomatic relations between Canada and Brunei had existed on an informal basis by the Canadian representatives in Singapore. Upon Brunei's independence, both governments sought a more formal arrangement. Canada established a High Commission in Brunei on January 1, 1984, with Charles John Small as the first high commissioner.

== List of heads of mission ==
No.	Name	Term of office			Career	Prime Minister nominated by	Ref.
No.	Name	Start date	PoC.	End date	Career	Prime Minister nominated by	Ref.
1	James Ross Francis (Commissioner)	November 29, 1979			Career	Joe Clark (1979–1980)	
2	Gerald Francis George Hughes (Commissioner)	September 3, 1981			Career	Pierre Elliott Trudeau (1980–1984)	
3	Charles John Small	October 13, 1983	May 7, 1984	November 17, 1984	Career	Pierre Elliott Trudeau (1980–1984)	
4	Manfred Gustav von Nostitz	August 31, 1984	March 20, 1985		Career	Pierre Elliott Trudeau (1980–1984)	
5	Sean Brady	July 21, 1988	August 6, 1988		Career	Brian Mulroney (1984–1993)	
6	Bernard Arthur Gagosz	August 24, 1989	November 2, 1989		Career	Brian Mulroney (1984–1993)	
7	Gavin Hugh Stewart	July 30, 1992			Career	Brian Mulroney (1984–1993)	
8	Richard Belliveau	August 18, 1995	November 21, 1995		Career	Jean Chrétien (1993–2003)	
9	Gardiner Wilson	July 10, 1997	September 10, 1997		Career	Jean Chrétien (1993–2003)	
10	Neil Reeder	August 11, 1999	August 19, 1999	2002	Career	Jean Chrétien (1993–2003)	
11	Paul Lau	July 2, 2002	October 2002	September 2005	Career	Jean Chrétien (1993–2003)	
12	Léopold Battel	June 14, 2006	November 6, 2006	June 1, 2008	Career	Stephen Harper (2006–2015)	
13	Wendell Sanford	October 28, 2008	January 10, 2009	July 28, 2011	Career	Stephen Harper (2006–2015)	
14	Marcel Gaumond	May 9, 2012	June 25, 2012	January 2013	Career	Stephen Harper (2006–2015)	
15	Marina Laker	December 18, 2014	January 26, 2015	August 2017	Career	Stephen Harper (2006–2015)	
16	Caterina Ventura	August 17, 2017	January 18, 2018	September 2018	Career	Justin Trudeau (2015–2025)	
17	Jeanette Stovel	May 23, 2019	September 18, 2019	July 22, 2022	Career	Justin Trudeau (2015–2025)	
18	Ambra Dickie	July 29, 2022	October 20, 2022	July 18, 2025	Career	Justin Trudeau (2015–2025)	
19	Dr Tamer Mansy	September 8, 2025	October 18, 2025	present	Career	Mark Carney (2025–present)	
