= Graeme C. Clark =

Canadian ambassador

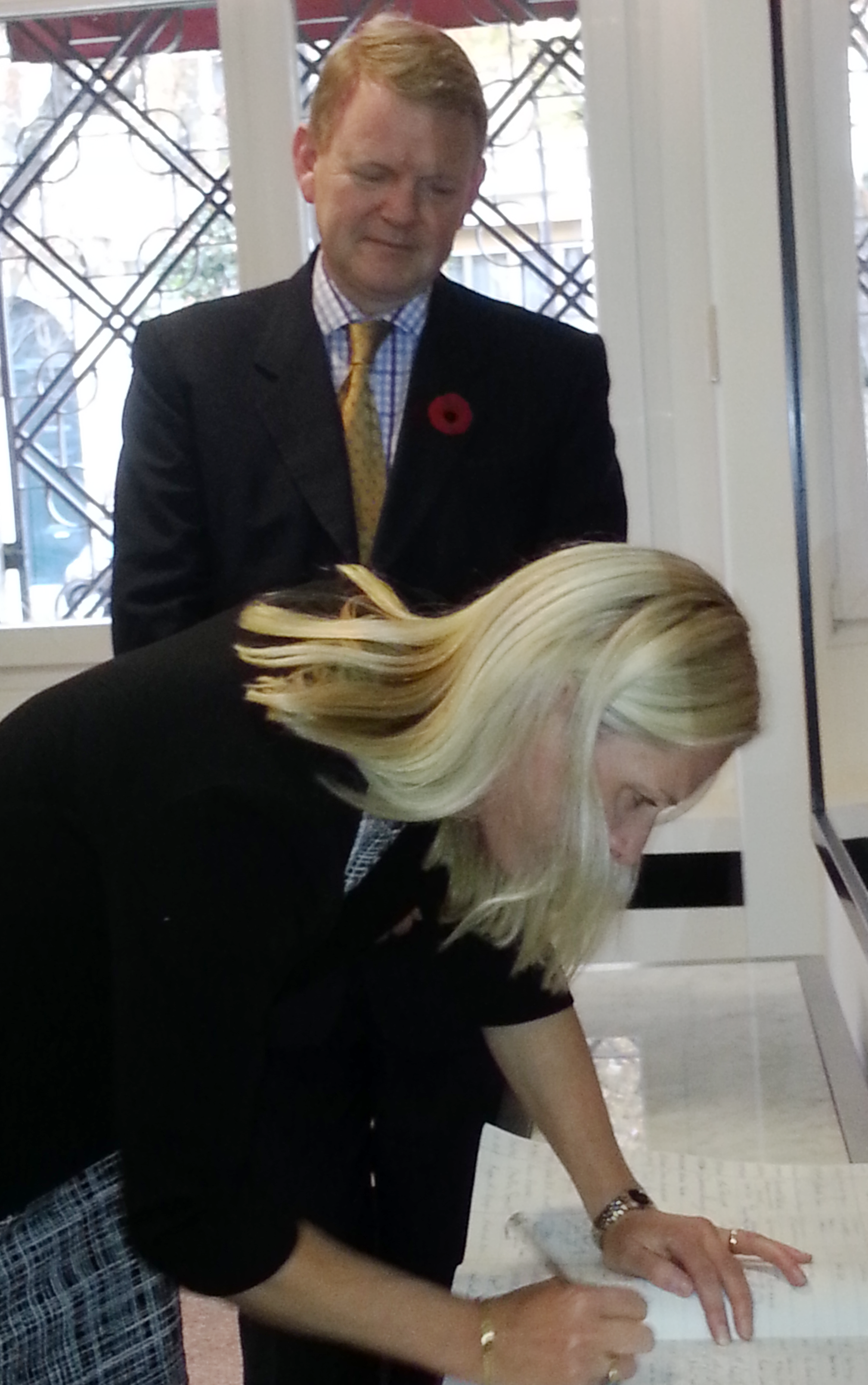
Graeme Clark looks on as Catherine McKenna signs the Registry at the Canadian Embassy in Paris.

Graeme C. Clark is the former Canadian Ambassador to Mexico (2019-2024), Peru and Bolivia (1997-2001), and to the Organization of American States in Washington, D.C. (2006-2010). He also served as Minister, Deputy Head of Mission to the Canadian Embassy, Paris (2014-2019).

Diplomatic posts
Preceded by Paul D. Durand	Canadian Ambassador and Permanent Observer to the Organization of American States; 2006–2010;	Succeeded by Allan B. Culham
Preceded by Douglas McCue	Canadian Ambassador Extraordinary and Plenipotentiary to Bolivia; 1997–2001	Succeeded by Hugues Rousseau
Preceded by Douglas McCue	Canadian Ambassador Extraordinary and Plenipotentiary to Peru; 1997–2001	Succeeded by Hugues Rousseau
