= Arthur Edward Blanchette =

Canadian diplomat

Arthur Edward Blanchette (March 23, 1921 - August 30, 2003) was a Canadian diplomat. Born in Hartford, Connecticut, he graduated from the University of Montreal in 1940 and took his PhD in 1945 in Ottawa where he entered in the Latin-American section of the Wartime information board. In 1969 he was at the Direction between francophone countries. He was Chargé d'Affaires to Egypt then Acting High Commissioner to South Africa followed by Acting Commissioner at the ICSC for Cambodia, then Chargé d'Affaires a.i. to Greece before returning home to a post in the department of francophone countries at External Affairs in Ottawa. Then Ambassador and Permanent Observer to the Organization of American States then to Tunisia, and, after an extended impasse, non-resident ambassador to Libya.

After retiring from foreign service, Blanchette became director of the historical division of the Department of External Affairs. He caused some controversy in 1983 due to a book he was preparing on the department's history. Some figures who appeared in the proposed book, including former External Affairs minister and future Prime Minister, Paul Martin, objected to its content.

Blanchette was the editor of two volumes of speeches and papers entitled Canadian Foreign Policy.

He was the father of Alix Cléo Roubaud.

Diplomatic posts
Preceded by Established	Chargé d'Affaires a.i. to Egypt; 1954–	Succeeded by Kenneth Porter Kirkwood
Preceded by Evan William Thistle Gill	Acting High Commissioner to South Africa; 1957–1958	Succeeded by James Joseph Hurley
Preceded by Eric Herbert Gilmour	Acting Commissioner to ICSC for Cambodia; 1958–1959	Succeeded by D'Iberville Fortier
Preceded by Hon. Antonio Barrette	Chargé d'Affaires a.i. to Greece; 1966–1967	Succeeded by Herbert Frederick Brooks-Hill Feaver
Preceded by Michel Antonin Careau	Ambassador and Permanent Observer to the Organization of American States; 1976–1980	Succeeded by Kenneth Bryce Williamson
Preceded by Jean-Marcel Touchette	Ambassador Extraordinary and Plenipotentiary to Tunisia; 1980–1983	Succeeded by Witold Maciej Weynerowski
Preceded by Michael Charles Temple	Ambassador Extraordinary and Plenipotentiary to Libya; 1982–1983	Succeeded by Witold Maciej Weynerowski
