= List of ambassadors of Canada to South Korea =

List of ambassadors

Ambassador of Canada to South Korea
- Incumbent; Tamara Mawhinney since April 6, 2023
- Seat: Embassy of Canada, Seoul
- Nominator: Prime Minister of Canada
- Appointer: Governor General of Canada
- Term length: At His Majesty's pleasure
- Inaugural holder: Richard Plant Bower
- Formation: September 24, 1964

The ambassador of Canada to South Korea is the official representative of the Canadian government to the government of South Korea. The official title for the ambassador is Ambassador Extraordinary and Plenipotentiary of Canada to the Republic of Korea. The ambassador of Canada to South Korea is Tamara Mawhinney who was appointed on the advice of Prime Minister Justin Trudeau on April 6, 2023.

The Embassy of Canada is located at 21 Jeongdong-gil (Jeong-dong), Jung-gu, Seoul (04518), Republic of Korea.

== History of diplomatic relations ==
Diplomatic recognition of South Korea occurred on April 8, 1949. Diplomatic relations between Canada and South Korea was established on January 15, 1963. Richard Plant Bower was appointed as Canada's first ambassador in South Korea with residence in Japan on September 24, 1964. On January 17, 1974, Canada established an embassy in South Korea.

== List of ambassadors of Canada to South Korea ==
No.	Name	Term of office			Career	Prime Minister nominated by	Ref.
No.	Name	Start Date	PoC.	End Date	Career	Prime Minister nominated by	Ref.
1	Richard Plant Bower	September 24, 1964	November 11, 1964	May 4, 1966	Career	Lester B. Pearson (1963–1968)	
2	Herbert Owen Moran	February 23, 1966	July 25, 1966	December 29, 1972	Career	Lester B. Pearson (1963–1968)	
3	Ross Campbell	June 8, 1972			Career	Pierre Elliott Trudeau (1968–1979 & 1980–1984)	
4	John Alexander Stiles	July 12, 1973	January 17, 1974	July 5, 1977	Career	Pierre Elliott Trudeau (1968–1979 & 1980–1984)	
5	Gerald Edward Shannon	June 30, 1977	September 1, 1977	July 23, 1978	Career	Pierre Elliott Trudeau (1968–1979 & 1980–1984)	
6	Derek Hudson Burney	October 12, 1978	October 6, 1978	October 6, 1980	Career	Pierre Elliott Trudeau (1968–1979 & 1980–1984)	
7	William Edward Bauer	February 5, 1981		1984	Career	Pierre Elliott Trudeau (1968–1979 & 1980–1984)	
8	Donald Wilfred Campbell	August 31, 1984	September 19, 1984	September 28, 1985	Career	John Turner (1984)	
9	Reginald Hardy Dorrett	January 16, 1986	April 1, 1986	October 3, 1988	Career	Brian Mulroney (1984–1993)	
10	Brian Schumacher	October 17, 1988	November 25, 1988	August 8, 1991	Career	Brian Mulroney (1984–1993)	
11	Leonard J. Edwards	August 13, 1991	September 12, 1991		Career	Brian Mulroney (1984–1993)	
12	Michel Perrault	May 3, 1995	June 7, 1995	July 28, 1998	Career	Jean Chrétien (1993–2003)	
13	Arthur C. Perron	July 15, 1998			Career	Jean Chrétien (1993–2003)	
14	Denis Comeau	July 16, 2001		July 19, 2004	Career	Jean Chrétien (1993–2003)	
15	Marius Grinius	August 9, 2004	September 1, 2004		Career	Paul Martin (2003–2006)	
16	Ted Lipman	July 31, 2007	August 31, 2007	April 14, 2011	Career	Stephen Harper (2006–2015)	
17	David Chatterson	July 19, 2011	November 7, 2011	October 9, 2014	Career	Stephen Harper (2006–2015)	
18	Eric Walsh	January 29, 2015	February 12, 2015	July 31, 2018	Career	Stephen Harper (2006–2015)	
19	Michael Danagher	September 4, 2018	December 26, 2018	September 28, 2021	Career	Justin Trudeau (2015–Present)	
20	Mark Fletcher	December 20, 2021	April 25, 2022		Career	Justin Trudeau (2015–Present)	
21	Tamara Mawhinney	April 6, 2023			Career	Justin Trudeau (2015–Present)	

== Canadian Diplomatic Complex ==
The current diplomatic complex in Seoul opened in 2007 at 21 Jeong-dong-gil, Jung District. It is the second permanent location with first opened in 1974. Diplomatic relations had existed since 1963 but were handled in Tokyo.

== See also ==
- Canada–South Korea relations
- List of diplomatic missions in South Korea
- List of diplomatic missions of Canada
