= List of high commissioners of Canada to Cameroon =

High Commissioner for Canada in Cameroon
- Incumbent; Marie-Claude Harvey since September 10, 2025
- Seat: High Commission of Canada, Yaoundé
- Nominator: Prime Minister of Canada
- Appointer: Governor General of Canada
- Term length: At His Majesty's pleasure
- Inaugural holder: Fulgence Charpentier
- Formation: March 1, 1962

The ambassador of Canada to Cameroon is the official representative of the Canadian government to the government of Cameroon. The official title for the ambassador is High Commissioner for Canada in the Republic of Cameroon. The current Canadian ambassador is Lorraine Anderson who was appointed on the advice of Prime Minister Justin Trudeau on August 31, 2022.

The High Commission of Canada is located at 607 Street 1792, "Les Colonnades" Building, New Bastos, Yaoundé, Cameroon.

As fellow members of the Commonwealth of Nations, diplomatic relations between Canada and Cameroon are at governmental level, rather than between heads of state. Thus, the countries exchange high commissioners, rather than ambassadors.

== History of diplomatic relations ==
Diplomatic relations between Canada and Cameroon was established on December 7, 1961. Fulgence Charpentier was appointed as Canada's first ambassador in Cameroon on March 1, 1962. Canada recognized Cameroon's entry into the Commonwealth on October 16, 1995, afterwards changing the title of ambassador to high commissioner.

== List of heads of mission ==
No.	Name	Term of office			Career	Prime Minister nominated by	Ref.
No.	Name	Start date	PoC.	End date	Career	Prime Minister nominated by	Ref.
Styled as "Ambassador Extraordinary and Plenipotentiary of Canada"
1	Fulgence Charpentier	March 1, 1962	June 27, 1962	July 5, 1965	Career	John G. Diefenbaker (1957-1963)	
2	Georges-Henri Blouin	May 4, 1965	May 4, 1965	July 2, 1967	Career	Lester B. Pearson (1963-1968)	
3	J.E. Thibault	September 28, 1967	September 23, 1967	September 23, 1969	Career	Lester B. Pearson (1963-1968)	
4	Charles Odilon Roger Rousseau	April 14, 1970	January 14, 1970	June 5, 1972	Career	Pierre Elliott Trudeau (1968-1979)	
5	Pierre Léon Gérard Asselin	June 6, 1972	August 24, 1972	November 24, 1974	Career	Pierre Elliott Trudeau (1968-1979)	
6	Claude Charles-Edouard Châtillon	October 21, 1975	October 23, 1975	June 12, 1978	Career	Pierre Elliott Trudeau (1968-1979)	
7	Gilles Horace J. Duguay	July 13, 1978	August 29, 1978	September 3, 1980	Career	Pierre Elliott Trudeau (1968-1979)	
8	Jacques D.E. Denault	July 10, 1980	November 5, 1980	July 31, 1982	Career	Pierre Elliott Trudeau (1968-1979)	
9	Claude Jean Saint-Pierre	September 22, 1982	October 12, 1982		Career	Pierre Elliott Trudeau (1968-1979)	
10	Marc Faguy	August 31, 1984	November 19, 1984	September 5, 1987	Career	John Turner (1984)	
11	André S. Simard	September 10, 1987	November 2, 1987	July 16, 1989	Career	Brian Mulroney (1984-1993)	
12	Anne Leahy	October 12, 1989	November 16, 1989	March 10, 1992	Career	Brian Mulroney (1984-1993)	
13	Arsène A. Després	August 27, 1992	January 5, 1993		Career	Brian Mulroney (1984-1993)	
Canada recognized Cameroon's entry into the Commonwealth, title of Ambassador became "High Commissioner"
14	Pierre Giguère	July 4, 1995	September 22, 1995	1998	Career	Jean Chrétien (1993-2003)	
15	Claude Baillargeon	July 15, 1998	2000	2002	Career	Jean Chrétien (1993-2003)	
16	Michel Perrault	July 26, 2000	December 29, 2000	July 31, 2003	Career	Jean Chrétien (1993-2003)	
17	Jules Savaria	September 15, 2003	December 27, 2003		Career	Jean Chrétien (1993-2003)	
18	Jean-Pierre Lavoie	September 20, 2006	October 27, 2006	September 14, 2009	Career	Stephen Harper (2006-2015)	
19	Jean-Carol Pelletier	September 10, 2009	January 4, 2010	September 20, 2011	Career	Stephen Harper (2006-2015)	
20	Benoît-Pierre Laramée	August 8, 2011	December 27, 2011	November 13, 2014	Career	Stephen Harper (2006-2015)	
21	René Cremonese	September 12, 2014	January 6, 2015	August 23, 2017	Career	Stephen Harper (2006-2015)	
22	Nathalie O'Neil	August 17, 2017	December 20, 2017	July 25, 2019	Career	Justin Trudeau (2015-Present)	
23	Richard Bale	September 6, 2019	November 7,2019	August 18,2022	Career	Justin Trudeau (2015-Present)	
24	Lorraine Anderson	August 31, 2022	December 29, 2023	July 25, 2025	Career	Justin Trudeau (2015-Present)	
25	Marie-Claude Harvey	September 10, 2025			Career	Mark Carney (2025-Present)	
