= Jean Désy =

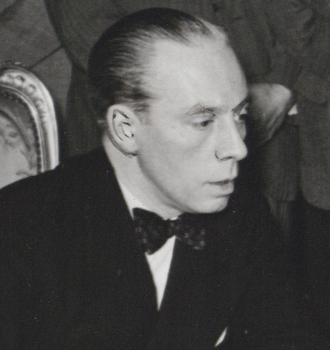
- Born: January 8, 1893; Montreal, Quebec, Canada
- Died: December 19, 1960 (aged 67); Paris, France
- Education: Université Laval; Sorbonne
- Occupation: diplomat

Jean Désy (French pronunciation: [ʒɑ̃ dezi]; January 8, 1893 – December 19, 1960) was a Canadian diplomat.

Born in Montreal, Quebec, he studied law at Université Laval and the Sorbonne in Paris. From 1919 to 1925, he taught history and law at the Université de Montréal.

Désy was recruited by Oscar D. Skelton, Under-Secretary of State for Foreign Affairs, in 1925 to fill the position of Counsellor in Canada's new foreign service. He was posted to the Paris legation in 1928 and served on many delegations abroad.

In January 1939 Désy was appointed Canada's first ambassador to Belgium and the Netherlands, and the first envoy to Brazil in June 1941. Named ambassador in late 1943, he was the first Canadian career diplomat to be named an ambassador (earlier ambassadors were political appointments). In September 1947 he was named Canada's first minister to Italy. In January 1952 he was seconded by the government to direct the Canadian Broadcasting Corporation's International Service (later Radio Canada International) to remove what was perceived as a left-wing bias in its reporting.

Désy finished his career in Paris as ambassador to France 1954–57, where he died in 1960.

Diplomatic posts
| Preceded by Georges Vanier | Ambassador to France; 1954-1957 | Succeeded by Pierre Dupuy |
