= William Ferdinand Alphonse Turgeon =

Canadian politician

The Honourable William Ferdinand Alphonse Turgeon

Member of the Legislative Assembly of Saskatchewan
- In office 1907–1921

Chief Justice of Saskatchewan
- In office 1938–1941
- Preceded by: Frederick W. A. G. Haultain
- Succeeded by: William Melville Martin

Personal details
- Born: June 3, 1877 Petit-Rocher, New Brunswick
- Died: January 11, 1969 (aged 91)
- Relations: Onésiphore Turgeon, father

William Ferdinand Alphonse Turgeon, PC, OC, QC (June 3, 1877 – January 11, 1969) was a Canadian politician and judge in the Province of Saskatchewan. He also served as a diplomat for the Government of Canada.

== Early life ==
Turgeon was born in Petit-Rocher, New Brunswick, the son of prominent Canadian politician Onésiphore Turgeon. His brother, James Gray Turgeon, was also a politician in Alberta. The three family members held public office concurrently between the years 1911 and 1921.

Turgeon received his early education in New York, and was awarded a Bachelor of Arts degree from Université Laval in 1900. He was called to the New Brunswick Bar in 1902. He moved to Prince Albert, Saskatchewan, the judicial centre for the North-West Territories, where he started a law practice and became a Crown prosecutor.

== Politician ==
He was a member of the Legislative Assembly of Saskatchewan for the ridings of Prince Albert City (1907–1908), Duck Lake (1908–1912), and Humboldt (1912–1921). From 1912 to 1918, he was the Provincial Secretary. From 1907 to 1921, he was the Attorney General. He is credited with having created the foundations of administrative and municipal legislation in the province.

== Justice of the Court of Appeal ==
From 1921 to 1938, he was a Justice of the Saskatchewan Court of Appeal and from 1938 to 1941 he was the Chief Justice of Saskatchewan. In 1941, he was sworn into the King's Privy Council for Canada.

== Diplomat ==
From 1941 to 1957, he held diplomatic posts mostly as the Canadian ambassador to Argentina, Chile, Mexico, Belgium, Luxembourg, Ireland, and Portugal.

After returning to Canada, he undertook a one-man inquiry into the Workers Compensation Board of Manitoba in 1958.

== Honours ==
In 1940, he was awarded an honorary Doctor of Laws from the University of Saskatchewan. In 1967, he was made an Officer of the Order of Canada "for over a half century of service to his country". The W.F.A. Turgeon Catholic Community School in Prince Albert, Saskatchewan is named in his honour.
