= Barry Steers =

Ambassador of Canada to Japan
- In office September 3, 1981 – November 24, 1989
- Monarch: Elizabeth II
- Preceded by: Bruce Irving Rankin
- Succeeded by: James Hutchings Taylor

Ambassador of Canada to Brazil
- In office 1971–1976
- Monarch: Elizabeth II
- Preceded by: Christian Hardy
- Succeeded by: James Howard Stone

Commissioner of Canada to Bermuda
- In office 1976–1979
- Monarch: Elizabeth II
- Preceded by: Office Created
- Succeeded by: Jim Sutcliffe Nutt

Personal details
- Born: January 15, 1927 London, Ontario
- Died: November 20, 2011 (aged 84) London, Ontario
- Spouse: Martha
- Children: Three

Ian Barry Connell Steers (January 15, 1927 – November 20, 2011) was a Canadian diplomat and business consultant. Steers served as the Canadian Ambassador to Japan from 1981 to 1989, Ambassador to Brazil from 1971 to 1976, as well as Canada's first Commissioner to Bermuda from 1976 to 1979. He later became the founding director of the Japan Society following his retirement from his diplomatic career.

== Biography ==
=== Early life ===
Steers was born and raised in London, Ontario. His father died when he was just seven years old and he was raised by his mother. Steers was the grandson of Canadian Colonel W. G. Coles. He graduated from a now shuttered high school in London, De La Salle secondary school. During his life, Steers became fluent in four languages – English, French, Portuguese, and Spanish.

Steers studied economics and political science at University of Western Ontario during the 1940s. He met his future wife, a 23-year-old Brescia University College student from Colombia named Martha, on a blind date while in college. The couple dated for three years before marrying in 1952 at a wedding ceremony held in Colombia. They had three children – Sara Maria, who was born in Colombia; Gregory, who was born in Greece; and Connell, who was born in Ottawa.

=== Career ===
In 1956, Steers joined the Trade Commissioner Service. He was posted to the embassies in Singapore, Greece, Israel, as well as Canadian Consulate in New York City early in his career. He returned to Ottawa during the late 1960s and early 1970s for a domestic posting.

Steers served as Canada's Ambassador to Brazil from 1971 to 1976. He then became the Canadian Consul General in New York City from 1976 to 1979. During those years in New York, Steers simultaneously served as the Canadian Commissioner to Bermuda, becoming the first Canadian diplomat to hold that post. From 1981 to 1989, Steers was posted as the Canadian Ambassador to Japan.

Steers retired from his diplomatic career in 1990 and became a business consultant. He became the director of several notable companies, including Industrial Bank of Japan's Canadian division and the London Life Insurance Company. He also sat on the boards of directors for numerous Canadian companies, including the Gendis Corporation, Canadian Pacific Air Lines, London Life Insurance Company, Canadian Pacific Hotels/Fairmont Hotels and Resorts and Manalta Coal.

He became the founding director of a Canadian Japan Society. Steers further was a member of the advisory council for the Canada-Japan Businessmen's Conference.

Steers died in November 20, 2011, at his home in London, Ontario, at the age 85. He was survived by his wife, Martha, to whom he had been married for 59 years; as well as their three children, seven grandchildren, and two great-grandchildren. His funeral was held at St. Michael's Catholic Church in London.
