= Lady Stanley =

Lady Stanley may refer to:

- Joan Stanley, Baroness Stanley, wife of Thomas Stanley, 1st Baron Stanley
- Constance Stanley, Baroness Stanley of Preston and later also Countess of Derby (1840–1922), wife of Frederick Stanley, 16th Earl of Derby, after whom the Lady Stanley Institute for Trained Nurses in Ottawa, Canada, is named
- Dorothy Tennant (1855–1926), wife of explorer Sir Henry Morton Stanley
- Margaret Beaufort, Countess of Richmond and Derby (1443–1509), mother of Henry VII of England; known as Lady Stanley during her marriage to Thomas Stanley, 1st Earl of Derby.
- Lady Stanley of Alderley (disambiguation), multiple people
