= Thomas Birkett =

Canadian politician

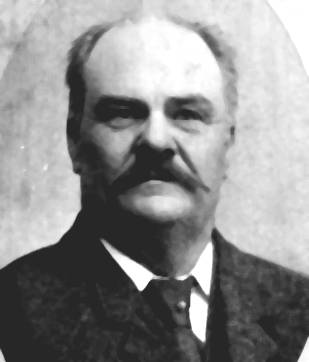
- Thomas Birkett Source: Library and Archives Canada

19th Mayor of Ottawa
- In office 1891–1891
- Preceded by: Jacob Erratt
- Succeeded by: Olivier Durocher

House of Commons of Canada representing Ottawa City
- In office 1900–1904

Personal details
- Born: February 1, 1844 Bytown, Canada West
- Died: October 21, 1920 (aged 76) Ottawa, Ontario, Canada
- Spouse(s): 1871 Mary Gallagher; 1904 Henrietta Gallagher
- Children: Thomas Miles Birkett; Frederick Birkett; Annette Birkett

Thomas Birkett (February 1, 1844 – October 21, 1920) was mayor of Ottawa, Ontario, Canada in 1891 and a member of the House of Commons of Canada representing Ottawa City from 1900 to 1904.

== Early life and marriage ==
Birkett was born in Bytown (today known as Ottawa), Canada West in 1844, the seventh child of Miles Birkett and Elizabeth Wren, who came from Cockermouth. England in 1838. His father was sadly killed in 1848 after being thrown from his horse. At the age of 13, he became an apprentice to a local hardware store owner, Thomas Isaac.

In 1866 at the age of twenty-two, he opened his own hardware store. Despite stiff competition, his store prospered and in 1878 he erected a substantially larger store complete with a separate warehouse. He imported supplies from across Canada, the United States, and the Dominion. This business, alongside profitable investments in real estate, made Birkett wealthy.

Birkett also worked as a part-time sewer inspector for Ottawa in 1876.

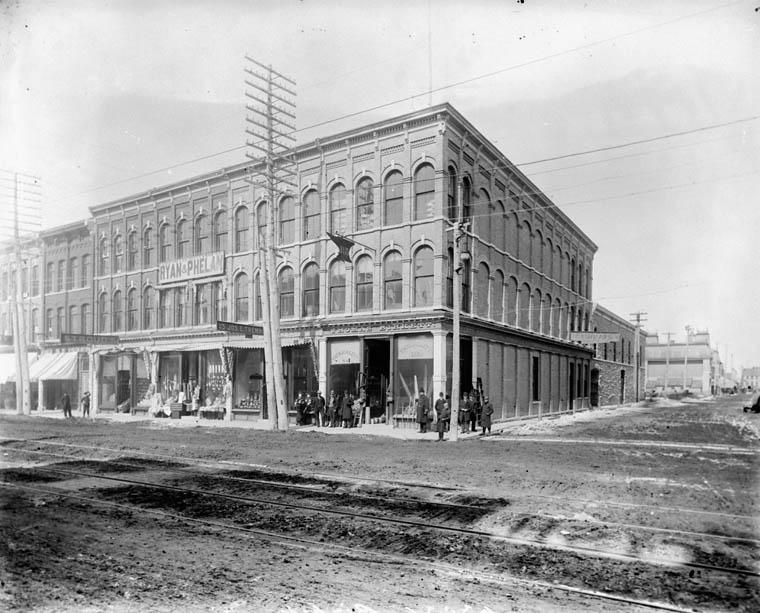
Thomas Birkett's Store, 115 Rideau Street, Ottawa, Ontario

In 1871, he married Melissa Gallagher, the daughter of contractor and civil servant Thomas Gallagher. Together, the couple had three children: Thomas (born 1872), Frederick (born 1876), and Annette (born 1874) who died in infancy. After Melissa's death, he married Henrietta Gallagher, Melissa's stepsister, in 1904.

In December 1888, Birkett's niece, Mattie Birkett, married Alexander Cameron Rutherford, the future first premier of Alberta.

== Political career ==
Birkett first entered into politics in 1867 when he was elected to the Ottawa school board. He served on the school board until 1871. In 1873 he was elected as alderman for St. George's Ward on the Ottawa City Council, an office he held until 1878.

=== Mayor of Ottawa (1891) ===
On January 5, 1891, Birkett was elected to a one-year term as mayor of Ottawa, defeating Pierre St. Jean, mayor of Ottawa from 1882-1883. His term as mayor was short-lived and punctuated by economic strife. The city plunged into a five-year recession from 1891-1896. Although unable to improve the city's economic standing, he played a central role in establishing the Lady Stanley Institute for Trained Nurses; the first nursing school in Ottawa. Although not directly resultant from his mayoralty, he also oversaw the implementation of electric streetcars in Ottawa and the creation of The Royal Ottawa Golf Club. He opted not to run for re-election in 1892.

=== Member of parliament (1900-1904) ===
In 1893, Birkett was nominated for a position in the House of Commons, but declined. In 1900, he decided to run for the Conservative Party. His election campaign was overshadowed by allegations of corruption during his time as mayor. Napoléon Belcourt claimed Birkett had purchased shares in the Ottawa Electric Railway, the company that owned Ottawa's streetcar network, at a reduced cost during the time the company's application was under consideration by the city. Birkett denied wrongdoing, noting that he purchased stock in the company from another private individual. The matter was quietly dropped after Belcourt was shown to have engaged in corruption himself and Birkett was elected without further issue.

During his time in the House of Commons, Birkett served on a variety of standing committees. He sought reelection in 1904 and 1908, but was defeated both times.

== Later life and death ==
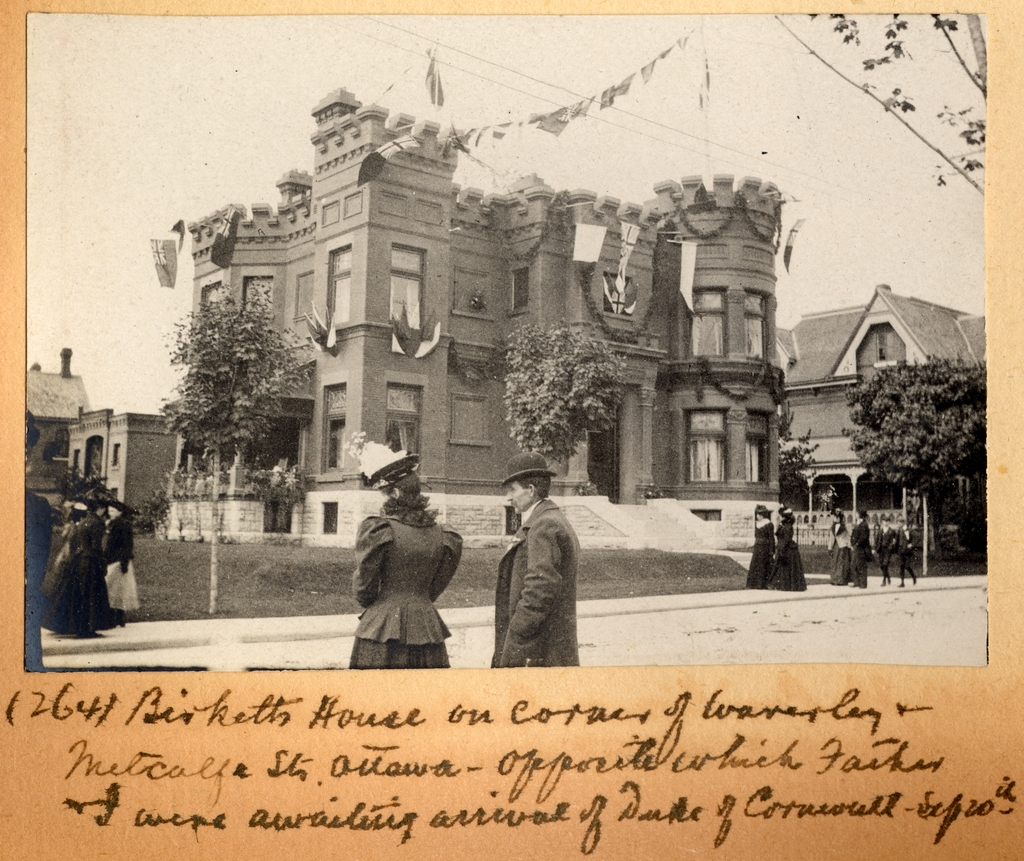
Birkett Castle on corner of Waverley and Metcalfe Streets, Ottawa, c. 1901

After losing the 1908 election, Birkett retired from politics and returned to running his hardware business alongside his son Thomas Miles Birkett. In addition to politics, he served in a variety of other capacities including as president of the advisory board of the Dominion Building and Loan Association at Ottawa in 1891. In 1900, he was named a trustee for the Ottawa Collegiate Institute. He was also a long-time member of the Masonic Order

In 1896 Birkett constructed a new stately residence at 306 Metcalfe Street. Nicknamed Birkett's Castle, the home was sold in 1925 and is now used as the Hungarian Embassy. Formally, it housed the Japanese Embassy, Heritage Canada, and the Boy Scouts of Canada.

He died in Ottawa of pneumonia on October 21, 1920. He is buried at Beechwood Cemetery.

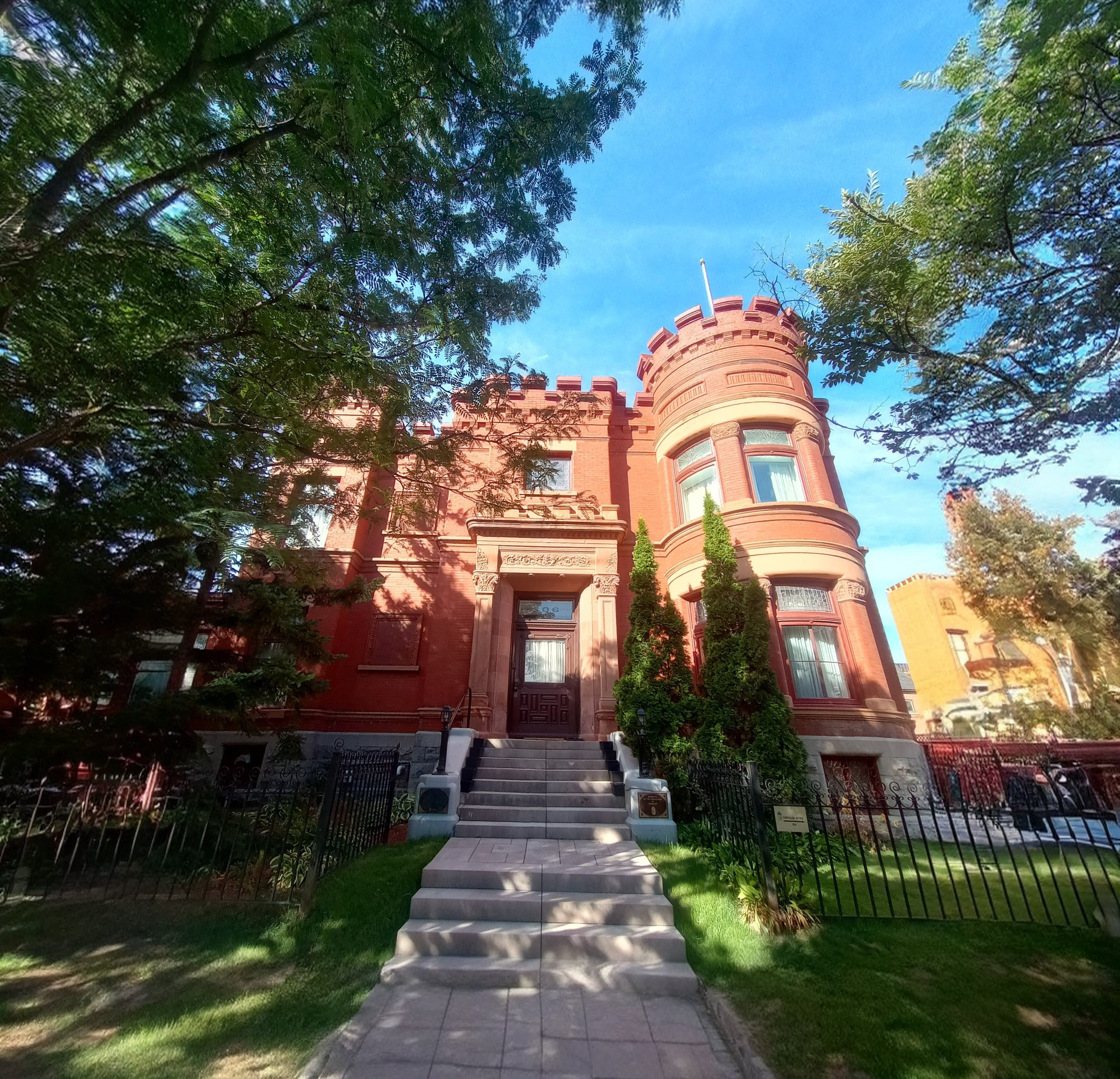
Birkett Castle site of Hungarian Embassy

Preceded by Jacob Erratt	Mayor of Ottawa; 1891	Succeeded by Olivier Durocher
