= Embassy of Canada, Tokyo =

Diplomatic mission of Canada to Japan

Embassy of Canada to Japan
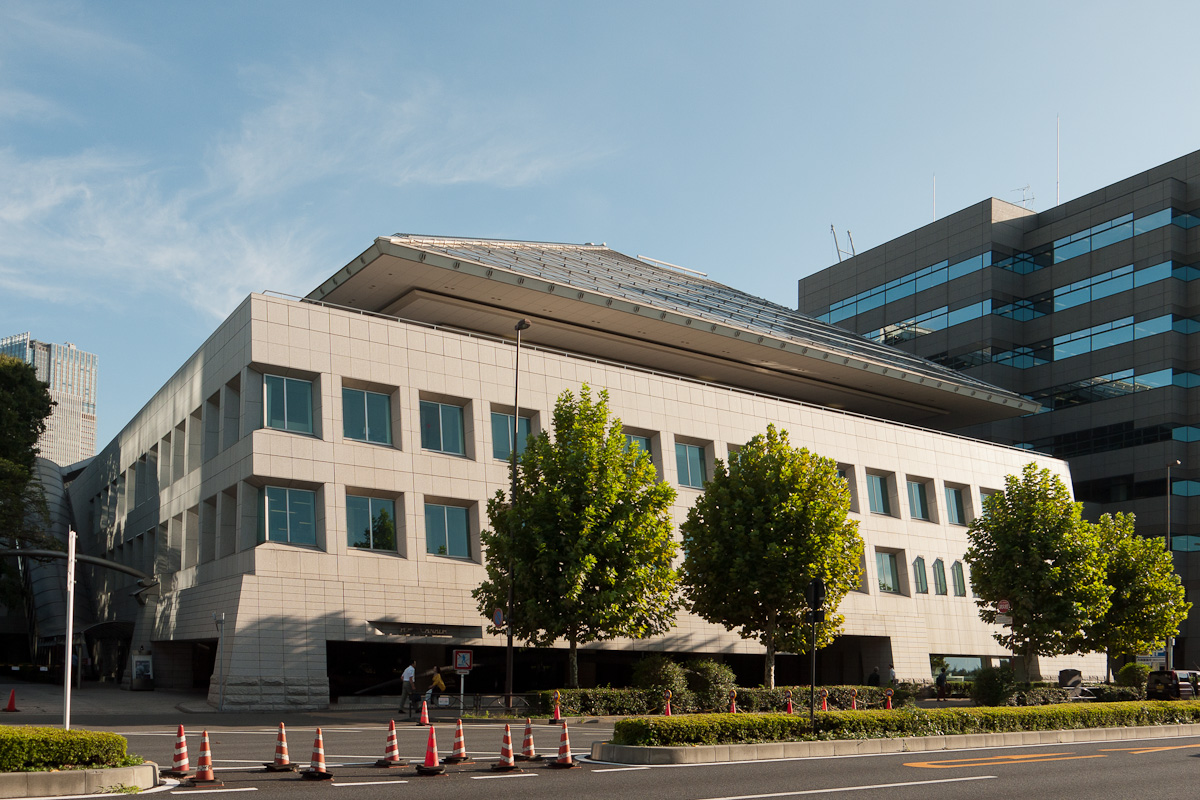
- Location: Minato-ku Tokyo 107-8503
- Address: 7-3-38 Akasaka
- Coordinates: 35.67361°N 139.72835°E
- Ambassador: Ian McKay

The Embassy of Canada to Japan is the main diplomatic mission from Canada to Japan, located in Tokyo.

== History ==
The reason for the legation's creation had much to do with anti-Asian feeling in the Canadian province of British Columbia during the first half of the 20th century. Prime Minister Mackenzie King was anxious to limit Japanese migration to Canada, saying "our only effective way to deal with the Japanese question is to have our own Minister in Japan to vise passports."

The British government was hesitant to anything that might be seen to undermine Imperial unity, but finally in May 1929, the Canadian legation opened. The first "minister" was Sir Herbert Marler. The embassy soon added trade and political roles to immigration. Construction of the chancery was completed in 1934.

In 1938, the minister came back to Canada without being replaced. In 1941 when Canada and Japan were at war, the legation staff was placed under arrest and not repatriated to Canada until mid-1942.

After the war, Canada's leading Japan expert, Herbert Norman, instead of being minister to Japan was attached to represent Canada with Supreme Commander Allied Powers, General Douglas MacArthur.

In 1952, Canada and Japan had normalized relations and the legation was upgraded to an embassy, and R.W. Mayhew became Canada's first ambassador to Japan.

Canada built a new chancery on Aoyama Avenue, Place Canada, which was designed by Raymond Moriyama and was opened in 1991. The embassy is housed on the upper levels while the lower levels are let out for rental income. There is a stone garden at the fourth storey with a view of the Akasaka Palace gardens. At the basement level, the embassy hosts a public art gallery, a library, and the 233-seat Oscar Peterson Theatre. The elevator in the ambassador's house is the oldest functional elevator in Japan.

== Design ==
=== Design concepts ===
One of the first design ideas was to create a building in which would be a symbol of Canada within Japan, showcasing both cultures. With another concept of having a building expressing belonging, connectedness, and human spirit. To expand on the idea of human spirit Moriyama thought the symbolism of a tree house within the city would best represent this idea. The architect hoped it would surface nostalgic memories and idealisms for visitors. To symbolize a tree house there are levels within the building acting as tree branches. These branches were then named after Ikebana, form of a flower arrangement, with ten representing heaven, chi to represent earth, and jin to represent man. The top floors of the embassy located underneath the roof represent ten, while the leased offices spaces represent chi, and the entrance and main floor of the embassy represents jin.

=== Design elements ===
When announcing the Tokyo embassy project, the goal was to build an embassy that wouldn't cost Canadian citizens money. The Mitsubishi Trust and the Banking Corporation was chosen to be in charge of the project's finances, design, and construction. Mitsubishi, in exchange, would receive all the revenue from the leasable commercial spaces in the embassy until they obtained the money they invested.

When designing, factors like earthquakes and how to secure the building were heavily researched. Many tests simulating the effects of an earthquake, like the 1923 Tokyo earthquake, were conducted to examine the strength of the building. There is only one direct entrance into the embassy, and the lobby space is on the fourth floor. One must enter by ascending a set of escalators outside of the building. The main door and some windows are from the original chancery built in the 1930s.

The embassy is seven stories tall and made of concrete and granite. The program layout is split into two functions: the embassy on the top floors and the leased office spaces located on the bottom half.

Behind the embassy is a private residential area of the imperial household. The building was designed to be wide at the base to prevent pedestrians from seeing into the residence.

To respect the imperial gardens, the roof of the embassy is slanted to minimize the shadow the building would cast on the gardens. The maximum depth at which a shadow can be cast on the ground is 10 meters for only two hours of the day.

While most of the building is private, there are certain places visitors can see, like the Gardens, Prince Takamado Memorial Gallery, Oscar Peterson Theatre, and the E.H Norman Library. On average, the embassy receives around 10,000 visitors a year.

== Gardens ==
On the main floor of the embassy there is a zen garden designed by Shunmyo Majuno. He is the head priest of the Zen temple in Yokoyama, who still practices the traditional garden design of ishitateso. The stones used for the garden were used from the Hiroshima region. The purpose of this garden was to symbolize the friendship between the two countries, showcasing the Canadian terrain from coast to coast. In the garden are three pyramid shaped rocks in which show the mountains bordering the Canadian shield's western edge. An Inukshuk created by Kananginak Pootoogook from Cape Dorset, is located the far-right hand side of the garden. The neighbouring Takahashi Korekiyo Memorial Garden was used as a shakkei, the concept of a borrowed view, when designing the garden. This creates a feeling of being detached from the city, allowing one to be immersed within the treetops.

== Prince Takamado Memorial Gallery ==
The Prince Takamado Memorial Gallery is located on the second basement level with 7800 square feet of exhibition space. It exhibits Canadian works like paintings, sculptures, photographs, textiles, and other artwork and designs. Some of the exhibits included were, Glenn Gould in Photos & Movies, Travel Prints: The Beginning of Innuit Prints & Japan, and the Canadian Olympic Commemorative Coins. The gallery received its name from a previous commemorative event in which honored Prince Takamado.

== Oscar Peterson Theatre ==
The Oscar Peterson Theater is located on level B2 and has 233 seats in which showcases concerts, screenings, lectures/seminars, and conferences. The room was inspired by the early Noh theatre, where in the 17th century actors performed under the open skies in the glow of torch light. In order to replicate this there are metallic branches and leaves in which sparkle, leaving the impression of being under the stars.

== E.H Norman Library ==
The E.H Normal Library is on the same floor as the Prince Takamado Gallery and the Oscar Peterson Theatre. The library houses over 15,000 books in Japanese, English, and French. Within the collection there are a wide variety of Japanese novels, books on Japanese arts and crafts, Japanese sports, travel guides, journals related to Canada & Japan, films, as well as local and Canadian newspapers. The library is generally used the Japanese who are doing research on Canada and, the embassy staff who need any information regarding Japan. One of the goals when designing this library was to have a space in which is well lit and relaxing.

In May 2001, the library was named the E.H. Norman Library.

== Other art ==
Within the embassy are various other art pieces in which reference Japanese and Canadian culture. There is a bronze sculpture designed by Ted Bieler called ‘Wave Breaking’ in which references the rocky shores of the Atlantic coast. ‘Wave’ by Maryon Kantaroff is another bronze sculpture representing the Pacific Ocean, connecting the two cultures of Japan and Canada. Inside the embassy is ‘The Carved Glass Wall’ by Warren Carther. The piece shows the co-existence of nature and technology, and how it relates to the relationship between Japan and Canada.

== Awards ==
For the design Raymond Moriyama was awarded Japan Architects Association Top Honour Award, Shimizu Corporation President's Award, Architectural Institute of Japan: Architecture of the Year, and Art Directors Club of Toronto Gold Award. In November 2003 he was granted with Order of the Rising Sun, Gold Rays with Rosette. Then presented with this award in January the following year by Takashi Koezuka.

== See also ==
- Canada–Japan relations
- List of ambassadors of Canada to Japan
- Embassy of Japan, Ottawa
- Canadians in Japan
- Japanese Canadians
