= Thomas Miles Birkett =

Canadian politician

Thomas Miles Birkett (May 27, 1872 – September 28, 1934) was an Ontario merchant and political figure. He represented Ottawa South in the Legislative Assembly of Ontario from 1926 to 1929 as a Conservative Party of Ontario member.

He was born in Ottawa, the son of Thomas Birkett, and educated at the Ottawa Collegiate Institute. In 1896, he married Lyla Dealty Parlow. He operated a wholesale hardware business established by his father. His cousin, Mattie Birkett, married Alexander Cameron Rutherford, the future first premier of Alberta in 1888.
