= Irwin Haskett =

Canadian politician

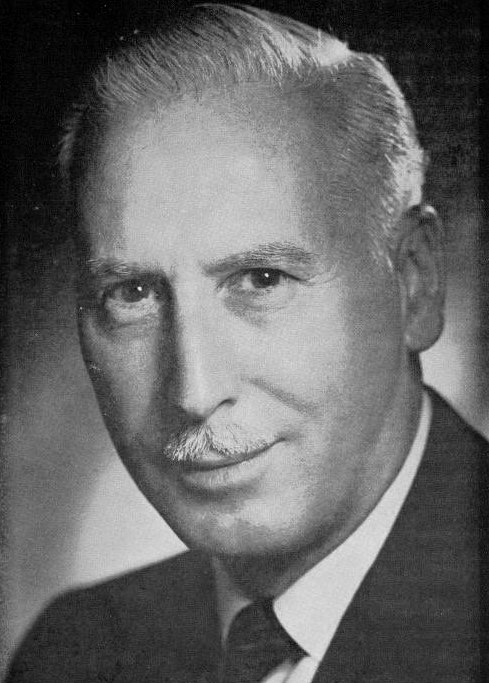

Ontario MPP
- In office 1959–1971
- Preceded by: George Dunbar
- Succeeded by: Claude Bennett
- Constituency: Ottawa South

Personal details
- Born: Wesley Irwin Haskett; April 22, 1903 Ottawa, Ontario
- Died: March 23, 1994 (aged 90)
- Party: Progressive Conservative
- Spouse(s): Vera Moorhead (d. 1970); Mary Costache (d. 2011)
- Occupation: Lawyer

Wesley Irwin Haskett (April 22, 1903 – March 23, 1994) was a politician in Ontario, Canada. He was a Progressive Conservative member of the Legislative Assembly of Ontario from 1959 to 1971 who represented the riding of Ottawa South. He was a cabinet minister in the government of Leslie Frost.

== Background ==
He was born in Montreal, the son of Samuel Wesley Haskett, and was educated at Lisgar Collegiate Institute in Ottawa. He became an attorney specializing in patent law. In 1936, he married Vera Moorhead. Haskett was a freemason. Vera died in 1970 and Haskett remarried Mary Costache.

Haskett was active in the Ottawa community serving as president of the Ottawa Board of Trade and the Ontario Chamber of Commerce. He was one of the founders of the annual Tulip Festival in Ottawa which he regularly attended. His wife Mary said, "We always went to look at the tulips." He died in 1994.

== Politics ==
In the 1959 provincial election, he ran as the Progressive Conservative candidate in the riding of Ottawa South. He defeated Liberal candidate Archibald Laidlaw by 1,870 votes. He was re-elected in 1963 and 1967. He retired from office in 1971.

On November 8, 1961, he was appointed to cabinet as Minister of Reform Institutions. On August 14, 1963 he was reassigned as Minister of Transport. He continued as Minister until 1971 when Bill Davis decided to drop him from his cabinet.

=== Cabinet positions ===
Robarts ministry, Province of Ontario (1961–1971)
Cabinet posts (2)
Predecessor	Office	Successor
James Auld	Minister of Transport; 1963–1971	Charles MacNaughton
George Wardrope	Minister of Reform Institutions; 1961–1963	Allan Grossman
