= Warren Carther =

Canadian glass artist (born 1951)

- Born: 1951 (age 74–75)
- Education: California College of the Arts, University of Manitoba, BFA.
- Known for: Glass artist

Warren Carther RCA (born 1951) is a glass artist based in Winnipeg, Manitoba.

His educational background includes study in glass-blowing at the Naples Mill School of Arts and Crafts, New York (1974), glass art at the California College of the Arts, as a student of Marvin Lipofsky. During his early career (1979-1986), Carther's love of architecture inspired him to create sculptural works that were not for architecture but were in homage to architecture. His international works are many, often featured in airports, corporate, and government buildings.

Carther is best known for his large-scale glass sculpture and innovative approach, including his creative use of dichromic glass, acid-etching and abrasive glass carving in his works. Most notable works include Chronos Trilogy, Hong Kong (1998) and Euphony, Anchorage International Airport, Alaska (2004). Carther's work has been published in many books and magazines, among them; International Glass Art by R. Yelle and Colours of Architecture by A. Moore. His awards include; The Royal Architectural Institute of Canada's Allied Arts Medal, Award of Excellence, the Allied Arts Medal (2007), and The Ontario Association of Architects Allied Arts Award, for innovative collaboration with an architect for the Canadian Embassy, Tokyo (1992).

== Biography ==
Warren Carther's interest in glass as an art form began with blown glass. In 1977, while a student at the California College of the Arts, in Oakland California, Carther began to envision creating enormous walls of sculpted glass. He soon realized that the architectonic scale he was seeking was not possible at the end of a blowpipe, therefore in order to achieve the scale he desired, he would have to push glass in new ways, beyond what had been considered in the past. Thus began a long process of experimentation and discovery in technique and structure, which led to the work he currently creates. It is Carther's aesthetic vision, combined with an understanding and emphasis on the structural qualities of glass, which has enabled him to create sculptural works of unique form and immense scale. His interest in working large, sculpturally and within the architectural environment has led him to develop techniques which produce work that defies categorization and at times, blurs the boundaries between art and architecture.

Euphony, Anchorage International Airport, Alaska, 2004

== Statement ==
Carther believes that art is an essential component of architecture and that the lives of human beings benefit significantly from art that they encounter in their daily lives. His understanding of this drives his desire to work in the architectural environment.

Carther's themes serve to assist the architectural environment in defining a sense of place. All of his work addresses the idea of the interdependence of human beings and nature. They represent an innate desire to comprehend the world around us; to look beyond the rational and the visible; to reveal some essential truth about the world and our place in it.

== Innovation ==
In 1972, when he first became intrigued with the notion of working in glass, it was not what he had seen that excited him but what it was that he had not seen. At a time when all other art forms were changing, glass, it seemed to him, was not. He wondered why so few artists were exploring a material which was capable of so much. After becoming aware of the, still very young, Studio Glass Movement in the USA (Studio glass), he studied glass-blowing in New York (1974) and California (1975–1977), Carther returned to Canada to explore the material on his own.

He wanted to work sculpturally in glass on a very large scale and within architectural environments. Not wanting to accept the structural and aesthetic limitations of stained glass, he began experimenting with techniques such as acid etching and abrasive blast carving. In 1981, Carther came to the realization that he did not need lead at all, that if he worked with thicker ¾ inch plate glass, he could carve deeply into glass with abrasive blast and not compromise the structural capabilities of the glass, allowing him to work at almost any scale. He also began to fire glass enamel onto the plate for colour. This method of working became his primary technique.

== History of work ==
=== North America ===
Canada

- 2010, Winnipeg International Airport, Winnipeg, Canada

Carved glass sculpture, stacked glass technique, 12.2 ft. X 7.2 ft. X 3.4 ft.

- 2007, Blue Cross Headquarters, Winnipeg, Canada

Carved Glass Wall, 15 Ft. X 9 Ft.

- 2006, Re-fit Health Centre, Winnipeg, Canada

Two Carved Glass Walls: 22Ft. X 6Ft. X 1.5Ft.

- 1999, Ottawa International Airport, Ottawa, Canada

Carved Glass Sculpture, 14 ft. X 12Ft. X 6Ft.

- 1994, Investors Group - One Canada Centre, Winnipeg, Canada

Carved Glass Sculpture consisting of two towers of glass, each 35 Ft. high X12 Ft.

- 1986, Winnipeg Law Courts Building, Winnipeg, Canada

8 courtroom entries - 16 Carved glass panels

United States

- 2008, Sacred Heart Medical Center, Eugene, OR, USA

Carved Glass Panels, multiple panels, Total length: 52 ft. X 8 ft.

- 2004, Anchorage International Airport, Anchorage, Alaska

Carved Glass Sculpture consisting of nine towers of glass. Total length: 135 Ft. Height: 27 Ft.

- 2003, Orange County Convention Center, Orlando, Florida

Carved glass Wall, 25 Ft. X 15 Ft.

- 2002, AstraZeneca Pharmaceuticals, US Corporate Headquarters, Wilmington, Delaware

Carved Glass Wall, 27 Ft. X 15 Ft.

=== Europe ===
England

- 2015, The Canadian High Commission, London, UK

Carved sculptural glass panels, 12.5 Ft. X 6 Ft.

France

- 2000, Charles de Gaulle Airport, Paris, France

Reflective Carved Glass Wall: 100 Ft. X 6Ft.

=== Asia ===
Hong Kong

- 1999, Swire Properties Ltd. Lincoln House, Hong Kong

Three Carved Glass Sculptures located within one office tower: 40 ft. X12Ft. - 100Ft. X 27Ft. - 27Ft. X16Ft.

Japan

- 1991, Canadian Embassy, Tokyo, Japan

Carved, sculptural glass wall, 25Ft. X 22Ft.

== Awards and distinctions ==
- Royal Architectural Institute of Canada (RAIC), 2007
- Award of Excellence - Allied Arts Medal
- Royal Canadian Academy of Arts (RCA), 2002

Elected to the academy

- The Saiyde Bronfman Award for Excellence in the Crafts, 2002, 1997, 1992, 1990, 1989

Five time nominee for Canada's most prestigious craft award.

- Ontario Association of Architects Allied Arts Award, 1992

Received award for innovative collaboration with an architect, for the glass sculpture in the Canadian Embassy in Tokyo

- The American Craft Award, 1991

Received American Craft Award in architectural glass; Received American Craft Merit Award in sculpture

== Publications ==
=== Periodicals ===
| Hong Kong Space | Hong Kong |
| Stained Glass Quarterly | USA |
| Asian Architect and Contractor | Hong Kong |
| Canadian House & Home | Canada |
| Nu Magazine | Hong Kong |
| Process Architecture | Japan |
| La Republique | France |
| New York Times | USA |
| Maclean's Magazine | Canada |
| Western Living Magazine | Canada |
| Gourmet Magazine | USA |
| Ntz’ain | Athens, Greece |
| B.C.S. Magazine | Japan |
| Border Crossings | Canada |
| Azure Magazine | Canada |
| Reader's Digest | Canada |

=== Books ===
- Colours of Architecture, by Andrew Moor, Published by Mitchell Beazley, London, UK
- A Celebration of Glass, by Kenneth vonRoenn Jr., Butler Books, USA
- International Glass Art by Richard Wilfred Yelle, Schiffer Publishing, USA
- The Art of Glass by Stephen Knapp, Rockport Press, USA
- Designing With Glass (An International Survey) by Carol Soucek King, PBC International, Distributed by Rizzoli (U.S.) Hearst Corp (Overseas)
- Contemporary Stained Glass, by J. Russ and L. Lynne, Doubleday, Canada
- Creative Designs in Furniture, Kraus Sikes Inc., USA

== Lectures ==
Carther is often invited to speak about his work and public art. He has spoken in Canada, the US and Australia. In June 2007, Carther spoke on transformations in the relationship between public art and glass in the late 20th and early 21st centuries when he presented a lecture to the Glass Art Society (GAS) in Pittsburgh, PA.
