= List of ambassadors of Canada to Japan =

Ambassador of Canada to Japan
- Incumbent; Ian G. McKay since April 14, 2021
- Seat: Embassy of Canada, Tokyo
- Nominator: Prime Minister of Canada
- Appointer: Governor General of Canada
- Term length: At His Majesty's pleasure
- Inaugural holder: Herbert Meredith Marler
- Formation: January 18, 1929

The ambassador of Canada to Japan is the official representative of the Canadian government to the government of Japan. The official title for the ambassador is Ambassador Extraordinary and Plenipotentiary of Canada to Japan. The ambassador of Canada to Japan is Ian G. McKay who was appointed on the advice of Prime Minister Justin Trudeau on April 14, 2021.

The Embassy of Canada is located at 3-38 Akasaka 7-chome, Minato-ku, Tokyo, Japan, 107-8503.

== History of diplomatic relations ==
Diplomatic relations between Canada and Japan were established on January 31, 1928. Canada's third legation abroad was established in Japan on January 18, 1929, in Tokyo with Herbert Marler as the first minister plenipotentiary to the country. The mission was downgraded in 1938 due to the worsening international situation with the Chargé d'affaires becoming the lead official. Diplomatic relations were severed and the embassy formally closed on December 7, 1941, after the Japanese attack on World War II. Following the war, Canada's mission in Tokyo was accredited to the Supreme Commander Allied Powers, with Egerton Herbert Norman appointed head of mission on July 7, 1946. After the peace treaty with Japan, diplomatic relations resumed, and the mission upgraded to an embassy on March 18, 1950, with the first ambassador Robert Wellington Mayhew appointed on September 25, 1952.

== List of ambassadors of Canada to Japan ==
No.	Name	Term of office			Career	Prime Minister nominated by	Ref.
No.	Name	Start Date	PoC.	End Date	Career	Prime Minister nominated by	Ref.
Titled as Envoy Extraordinary and Minister Plenipotentiary
1	Herbert Meredith Marler	January 18, 1929	September 18, 1929	July 3, 1936	Non-Career	W. L. Mackenzie King (1926–1930 & 1935–1948)	
2	Robert Randolph Bruce	May 20, 1936	November 7, 1936	December 1938	Non-Career	W. L. Mackenzie King (1926–1930 & 1935–1948)	
–	Edgar D'Arcy McGreer (Chargé d'Affaires)	December 1938		December 7, 1941	Career	W. L. Mackenzie King (1926–1930 & 1935–1948)	
3	Egerton Herbert Norman (Head of Mission to SCAP)	July 7, 1946	August 14, 1946	October 21, 1950	Career	W. L. Mackenzie King (1926–1930 & 1935–1948)	
4	Arthur Redpath Menzies (Head of Mission to SCAP)	November 18, 1950		April 28, 1952	Career	Louis St. Laurent (1948–1957)	
–	Arthur Redpath Menzies (Chargé d'Affaires)	April 28, 1952		January 15, 1953	Career	Louis St. Laurent (1948–1957)	
Titled as Ambassador Extraordinary and Plenipotentiary
5	Robert Wellington Mayhew	September 25, 1952	January 15, 1953	November 23, 1954	Non-Career	Louis St. Laurent (1948–1957)	
6	Thomas Clayton Davis	June 10, 1954		March 25, 1957	Non-Career	Louis St. Laurent (1948–1957)	
–	James Clelland Britton (Chargé d'Affaires)	November 23, 1954			Career	Louis St. Laurent (1948–1957)	
–	Theodore Francis Moorhouse Newton (Chargé d'Affaires)	March 25, 1957		September 1957	Career	Louis St. Laurent (1948–1957)	
7	William Frederick Bull	April 4, 1957	September 7, 1957	January 16, 1963	Career	Louis St. Laurent (1948–1957)	
8	Richard Plant Bower	November 5, 1962	March 18, 1963	May 4, 1966	Career	John G. Diefenbaker (1957–1963)	
9	Herbert Owen Moran	February 23, 1966	September 14, 1966	December 29, 1972	Career	Lester B. Pearson (1963–1968)	
10	Ross Campbell	June 8, 1972	January 31, 1973	December 15, 1975	Career	Pierre Elliott Trudeau (1968–1979 & 1980–1984)	
11	Bruce Irving Rankin	February 17, 1976	March 8, 1976	June 9, 1981	Career	Pierre Elliott Trudeau (1968–1979 & 1980–1984)	
12	Barry Connell Steers	September 3, 1981	October 26, 1981	November 24, 1989	Career	Pierre Elliott Trudeau (1968–1979 & 1980–1984)	
13	James Hutchings Taylor	September 7, 1989	December 12, 1989	March 12, 1993	Career	Brian Mulroney (1984–1993)	
14	Donald Wilfred Campbell	January 5, 1993	April 15, 1993	September 6, 1997	Career	Brian Mulroney (1984–1993)	
15	Leonard J. Edwards	November 20, 1997	January 22, 1998	June 11, 2001	Career	Jean Chrétien (1993–2003)	
16	Robert G. Wright	May 28, 2001	June 21, 2001	July 12, 2005	Career	Jean Chrétien (1993–2003)	
17	Joseph Caron	August 19, 2005	December 14, 2005	August 3, 2008	Career	Paul Martin (2003–2006)	
18	Jonathan Fried	September 2, 2008	November 17, 2008	November 5, 2012	Career	Stephen Harper (2006–2015)	
19	Mackenzie Clugston	September 17, 2012	December 14, 2012	2016	Career	Stephen Harper (2006–2015)	
20	Ian Burney	July 18, 2016	September 21, 2016		Career	Justin Trudeau (2015–Present)	
21	Ian G. McKay	April 14, 2021	September 10, 2021		Non-Career	Justin Trudeau (2015–Present)	

== See also ==
- Canada–Japan relations
