= Canada–Japan relations =

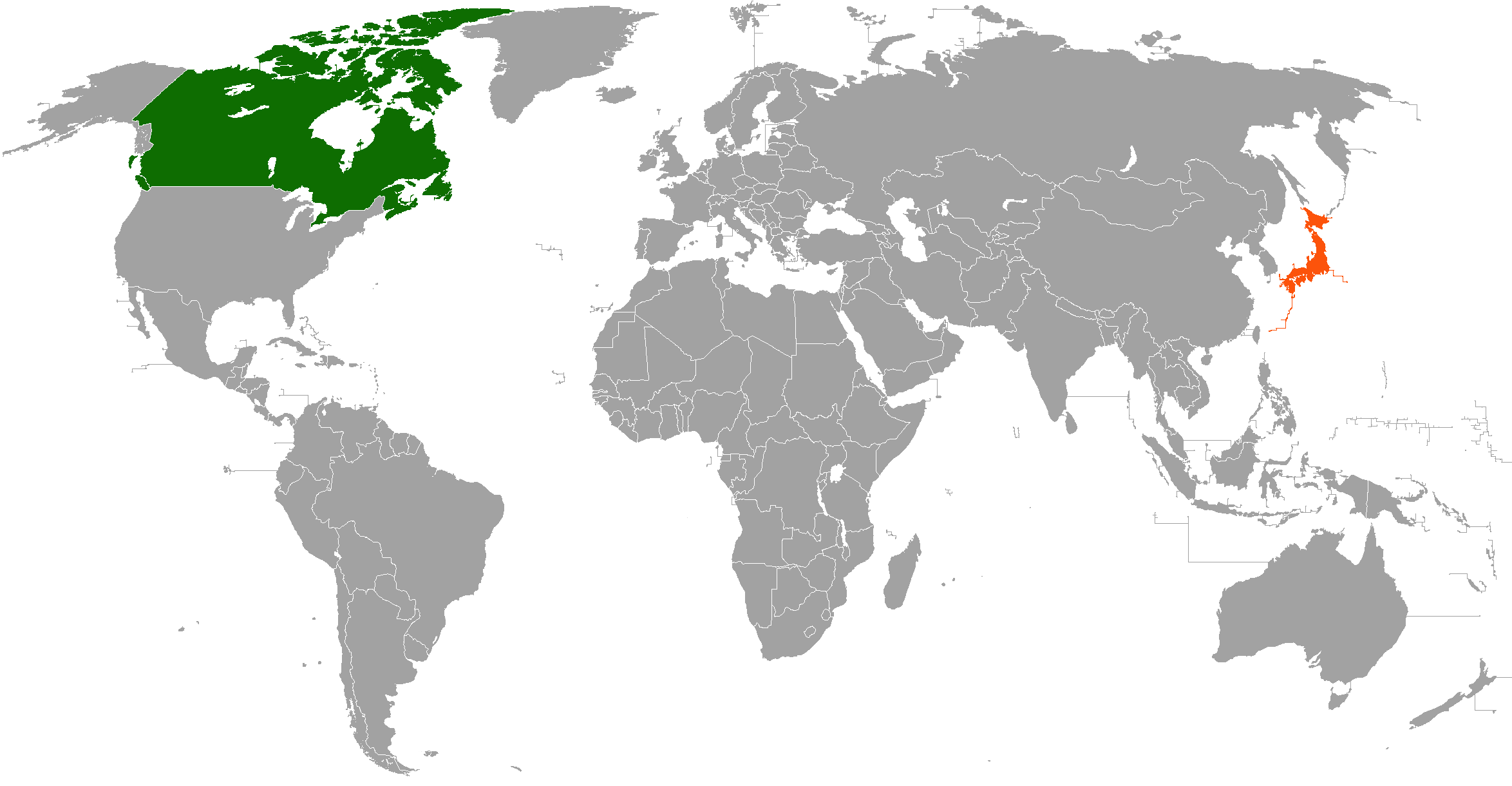

- Canada: Japan

Diplomatic mission
- Embassy of Canada, Tokyo: Embassy of Japan, Ottawa

Canada–Japan relations are amicable in many areas. Diplomatic relations between both countries officially began in 1928 with the opening of the Japanese consulate in Ottawa. In 1929, Canada opened its Tokyo legation, the first in Asia; and in that same year, Japan its Ottawa consulate to legation form.

Created in 1929, the Canadian mission to Japan is Canada's oldest mission in Asia and third oldest non-Commonwealth mission after the United States and France. Canada has an embassy in Tokyo and a consulate in Nagoya. Japan has an embassy in Ottawa and four consulates-general – in Calgary, Montreal, Toronto and Vancouver.

According to a 2017 BBC World Service Poll, 77% of Canadians view Japan's influence positively, with 12% expressing a negative view, making Canada one of the most pro-Japanese countries in the world.

Results of 2017 BBC World Service poll Views of Japan's influence by country (sorted by pos − neg)
Country polled	Positive	Negative	Neutral	Pos − Neg
China	22%	75%	3	-53
Spain	39%	36%	25	3
Turkey	50%	32%	18	18
Pakistan	38%	20%	42	18
India	45%	17%	38	28
Russia	45%	16%	39	29
Peru	56%	25%	19	31
Nigeria	57%	24%	19	33
United Kingdom	65%	30%	5	35
Mexico	59%	23%	18	36
Kenya	58%	22%	20	36
Germany	50%	13%	37	37
Indonesia	57%	17%	26	40
United States	65%	23%	12	42
France	74%	21%	5	53
Brazil	70%	15%	15	55
Australia	78%	17%	5	61
Canada	77%	12%	11	65

== History ==
=== Early contacts ===
Some Canadian-Japanese contacts predate this mutual establishment of permanent legations. The first known Japanese immigrant to Canada, Manzo Nagano, landed in New Westminster, British Columbia in 1877.

A number of Canadian missionaries working in Japan during the Meiji period played significant roles in both the development of local Japanese Christian churches as well as the modernization of Japan's educational system. Significant among this number were the Rev. Alexander Croft Shaw, a close associate of Yukichi Fukuzawa of Keio University, G.G. Cochran who helped found Doshisha University and, Rev Davidson Macdonald MD, who helped to establish Aoyama Gakuin University.

In 1887, the sailing route for steamships between Yokohama and Vancouver was opened, with vessels in the ocean service of the Canadian Pacific Railway making regular voyages. One of these Canadian ships, the RMS Empress of Australia and her captain, Samuel Robinson, RNR gained international acclaim because of rescue efforts undertaken after the 1923 Great Kantō earthquake.

From 1904 to 1905, Herbert Cyril Thacker of the Royal Canadian Field Artillery served in the field as a military attaché with the Japanese Army during the Russo-Japanese War. He was awarded the Order of the Sacred Treasure, Third Class by the Japanese government for his services during the Russo-Japanese War. He also received the Japanese War medal for service during that campaign.

Japan was an ally of the British Empire during the First World War. In fact, there was the North American Task Force and a monument to them in Stanley Park in BC.

=== Opening of diplomatic missions ===
The legation Canada opened in Tokyo in 1929 was its third outside the Commonwealth following Washington and Paris. That fact highlights the exceptional importance Canada placed on Japan as a hub for its diplomatic activities throughout Asia. However, the reason for the legation's creation also had much to do with anti-Asian feeling in the Canadian province of British Columbia during the first half of the 20th century. Canadian prime minister William Lyon Mackenzie King was anxious to limit Japanese migration to Canada, saying "our only effective way to deal with the Japanese question is to have our own Minister in Japan to visa passports." As a context, it is worth noting that Japan's consulate in Vancouver was established in 1889, 40 years before its embassy was opened in Ottawa in 1929.

The first Japanese Minister in Canada was Prince Iemasa Tokugawa, serving from 1929 to 1934. The first Canadian Minister in Japan was Sir Herbert Marler, serving from 1929 to 1936.

=== World War II ===
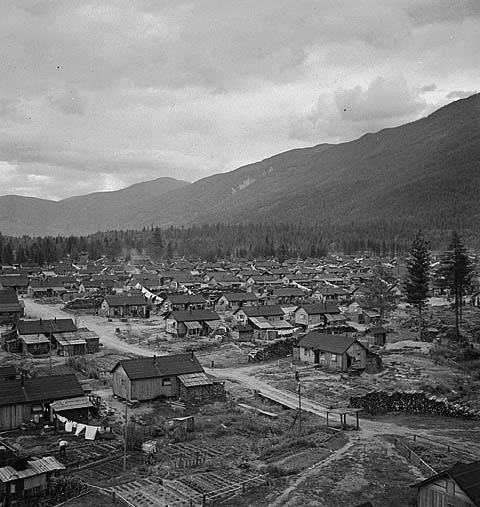
An internment camp for Japanese-Canadians in British Columbia.

Diplomatic ties were severed in 1941 with the start of the Pacific War. During the war, Canada interned Japanese-Canadians after passage of the War Measures Act for "national security" purposes. Japanese-Canadians had many of their rights revoked, including the right to work in any occupation they choose as well as their right to own property.

In December 1941, eight hours after the beginning of the Pacific War, the Commonwealth forces fighting Japanese forces, during the Battle of Hong Kong included the Canadian C Force, a brigade-level formation. Following their defeat at Hong Kong a few weeks later, hundreds of Canadians became prisoners of war (POW).

In Alaska, some of the Aleutian Islands were occupied by Japanese forces. On 15 August 1943, 29,000 US and 5,000 Canadian troops landed on Kiska island. They found the island abandoned, as Japanese forces had left two weeks earlier. Two fighter squadrons of the Royal Canadian Air Force also saw active service over the Aleutians, and claimed one aerial victory over a Japanese aircraft. Three Canadian armed merchant cruisers and two corvettes also served in the Aleutian campaign but did not encounter enemy forces.

Four Royal Canadian Navy vessels were part of the British Pacific Fleet (BPF) in 1944–45. A number of Canadians also served on British vessels, including aviators attached to Fleet Air Arm. In particular, the cruiser HMCS Uganda took part in a carrier raid on the major Japanese base at Truk. Afterwards the BPF took part in air raids on the Japanese Home Islands.

=== Post-War ===
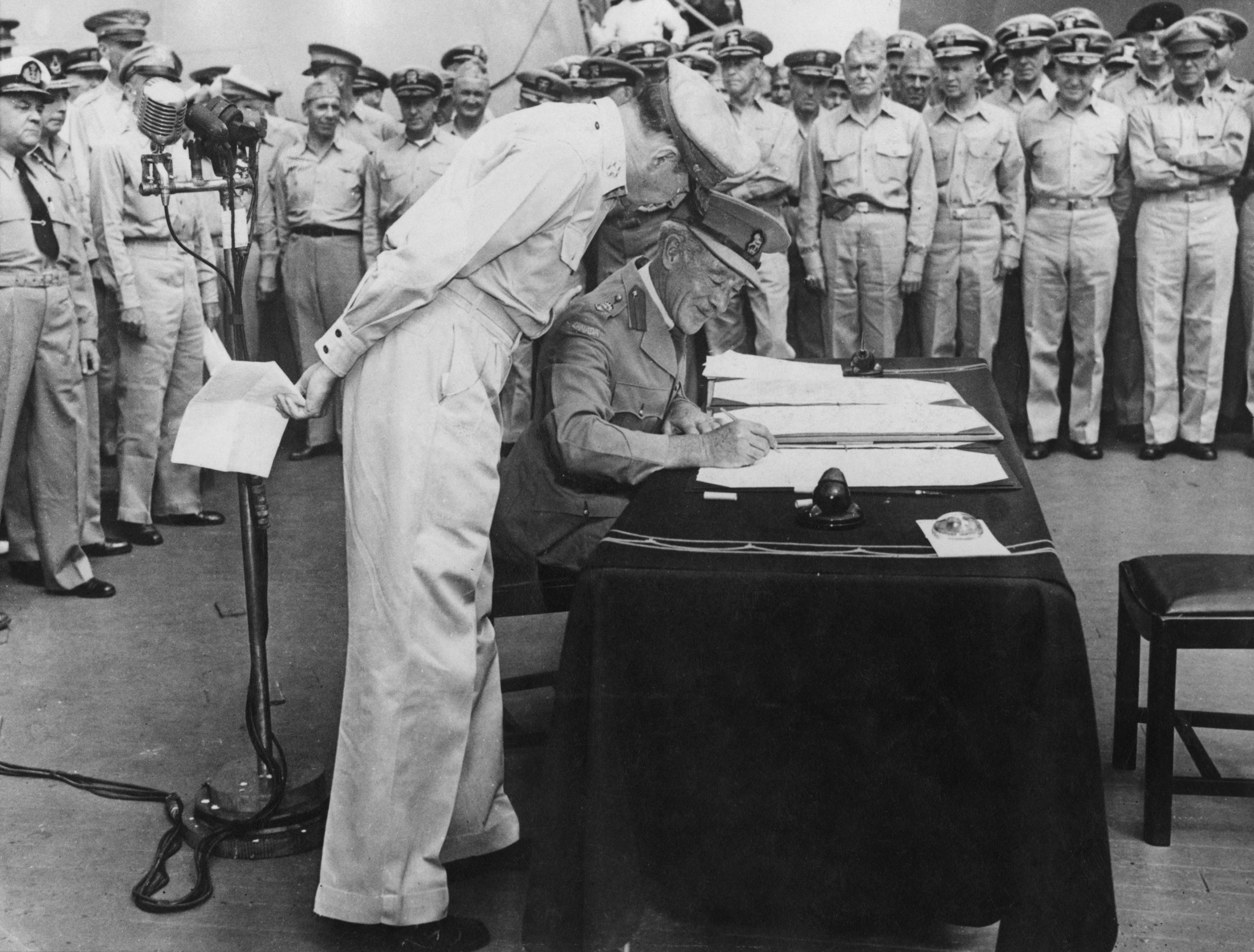
Col. Lawrence Moore Cosgrave, signs the Japanese Instrument of Surrender as Canada's representative on the USS Missouri.

Canadian representatives returned to Tokyo in 1946 in the wake of Japan's unconditional surrender to allied forces after the Atomic bombings of Hiroshima and Nagasaki. Japan also opened a diplomatic office in Ottawa in 1951 for the preparation of the future resumption of diplomatic relations. Full restoration of Japanese-Canadian relations accompanied the San Francisco Peace Treaty in 1952.

The Canadian Legation in Tokyo was upgraded to an embassy and Robert Mayhew was appointed as the first Canadian Ambassador to Japan after World War II. Japan also established an embassy in Ottawa and Sadao Iguchi became the first Japanese Ambassador to Canada.

Canada acted in various ways to assist Japan's re-entry into the international community. It was at Canada's initiative that Japan was admitted membership to the Colombo Plan conference that convened in Ottawa in 1954, the same year the bilateral Agreement Concerning Commerce was sealed. Canada supported Japan's inclusion in General Agreement on Tariffs and Trade (GATT); and when Japan entered GATT, Canada was one of only a small handful of nations who accorded it most-favored-nation status.

Japan was nominated by, and had the backing of Canada when it joined the United Nations in 1956. Similarly, Canada demonstrated strong support for Japan's admission to the Organisation for Economic Co-operation and Development (OECD) in 1963.

=== Maturing process ===
The most noteworthy event which symbolized the restoration of the Canadian-Japanese relationship was the visit of Prince Akihito (later Emperor from 1989 to 2019) to Canada in 1953. The following year, Canadian Prime Minister Louis St. Laurent and Japanese Prime Minister Shigeru Yoshida exchanged visits.

Since the 1950s, Japan and Canada have concluded a number of bilateral agreements concerning fishery, trade, aviation, postal service, atomic energy, and culture. There have been many exchange visits by both Japanese and Canadian prime ministers as well. After the 1960s, Prime Ministers Nobusuke Kishi, Hayato Ikeda, Kakuei Tanaka, Masayoshi Ohira, Zenko Suzuki, Yasuhiro Nakasone, Noboru Takeshita, Toshiki Kaifu, Tomiichi Murayama, Ryutaro Hashimoto, Keizo Obuchi, Yoshiro Mori and Junichiro Koizumi visited Canada. Canadian prime ministers John Diefenbaker, Pierre Trudeau, Joe Clark, Brian Mulroney, Kim Campbell, Jean Chrétien, and Paul Martin visited Japan.

During this period, Prime Minister Brian Mulroney offered an apology in the House of Commons for the unjust treatment of Japanese-Canadians during World War II. As a response to Japanese-Canadian internment, Prime Minister Mulroney and the National Association of Japanese Canadians' President Art Miki signed the Redress Agreement to settle past historical issues in 1988.

In 2008, Canadian Prime Minister Stephen Harper was received at the Imperial Palace in Tokyo, marking the 80th anniversary of the start of formal diplomatic relations between Canada and Japan. In July 2009 Emperor Akihito and Empress Michiko made their first state visit to Canada.

In March 2011, Canadian prime minister Stephen Harper wrote and sent a condolence book to millions of Japanese people and Prime Minister Naoto Kan, following the 2011 Tōhoku earthquake and tsunami and Fukushima Daiichi nuclear disaster, in Chubu, Kanto and Tohoku region including Tokyo was affected and blackout.

On March 26, 2012, Canadian prime minister Stephen Harper visited the coastal region of Sendai, Japan.

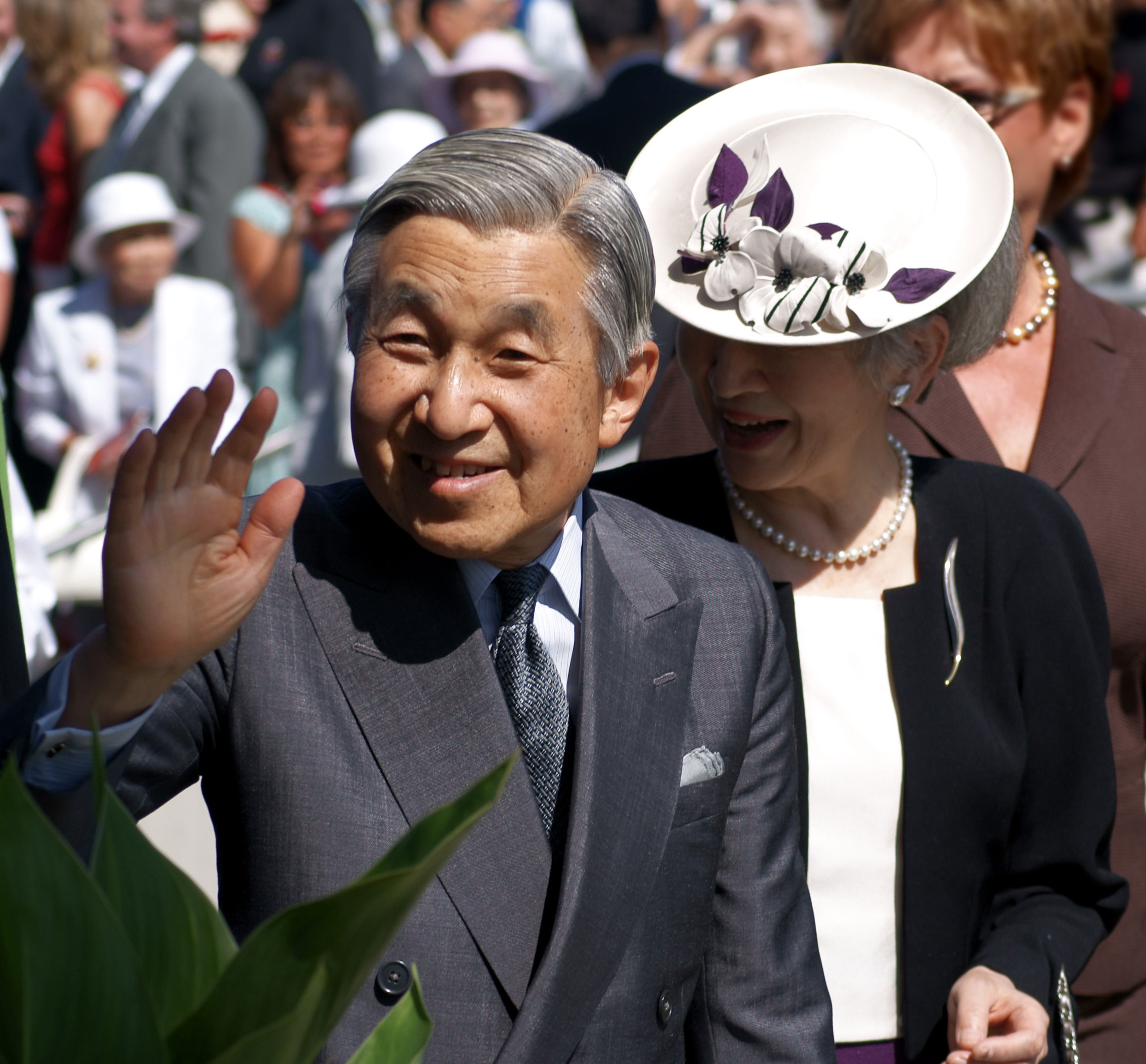
Emperor Akihito and Empress Michiko of Japan visiting the Richmond Olympic Oval (Richmond, BC)
on July 10, 2009.

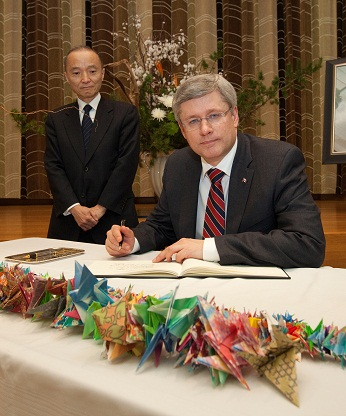
Prime Minister Stephen Harper signing a book of condolence for the victims of the 2011 Tōhoku earthquake and tsunami on March 23, 2011.

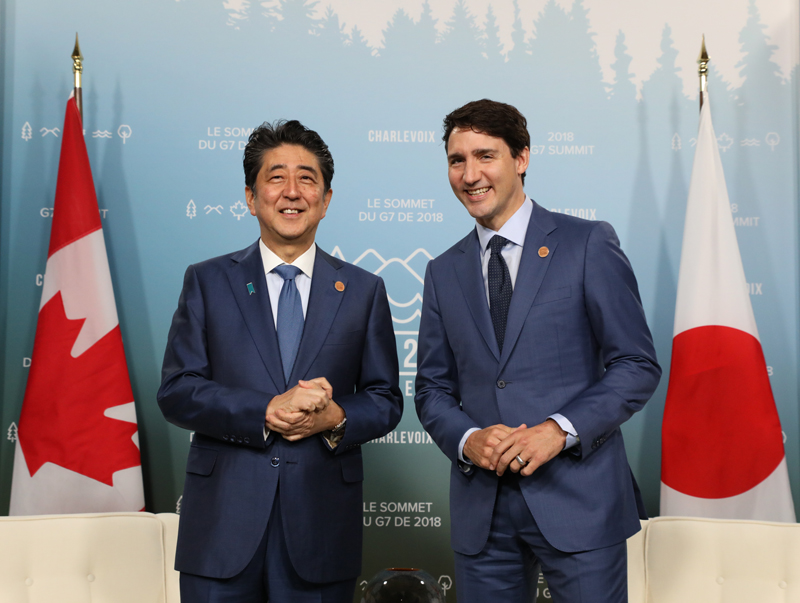
Prime Ministers Shinzō Abe and Justin Trudeau at the 44th G7 summit in La Malbaie, Quebec on June 8, 2018.

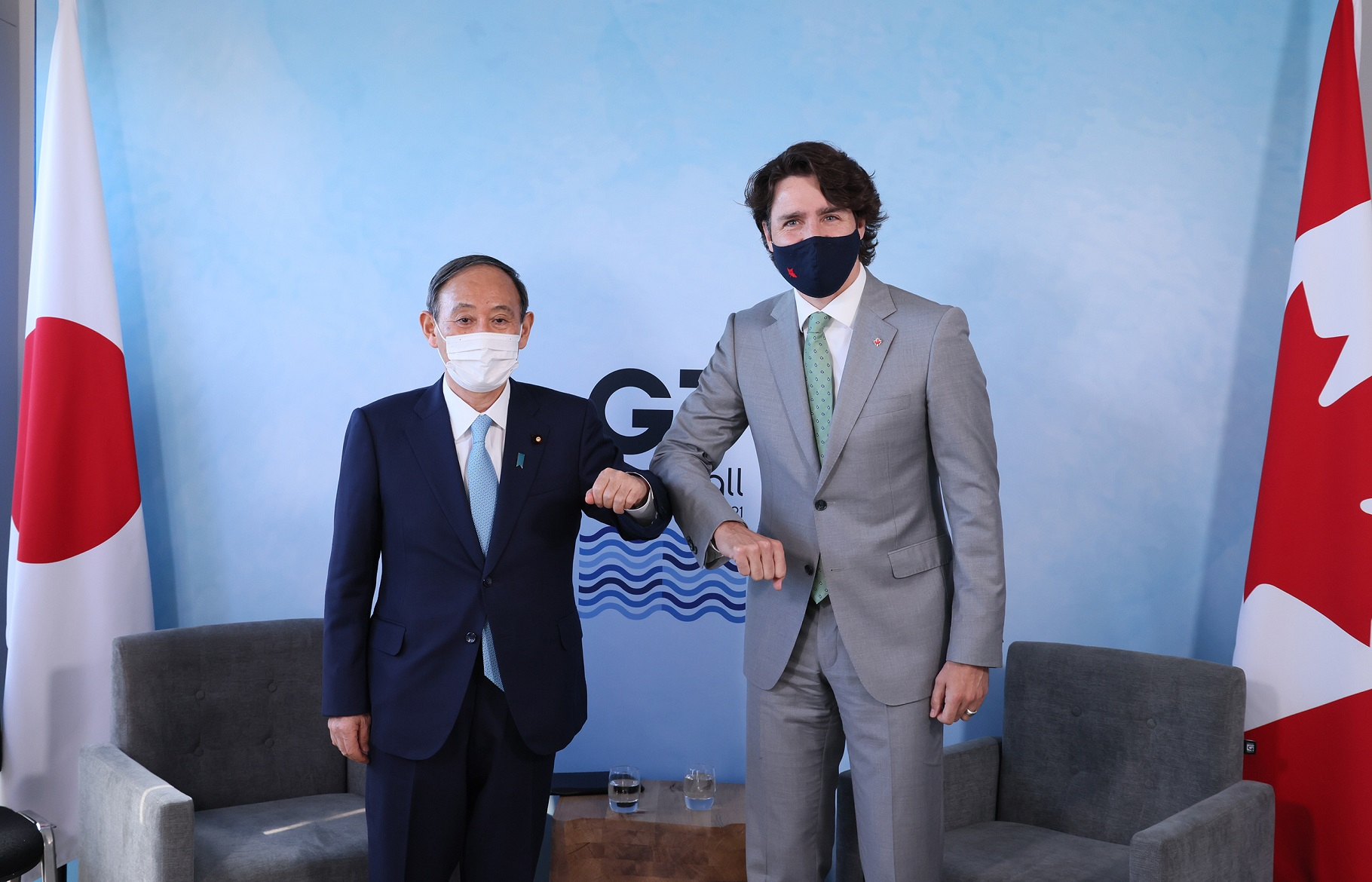
Yoshihide Suga with Canadian prime minister Justin Trudeau in June 2021.

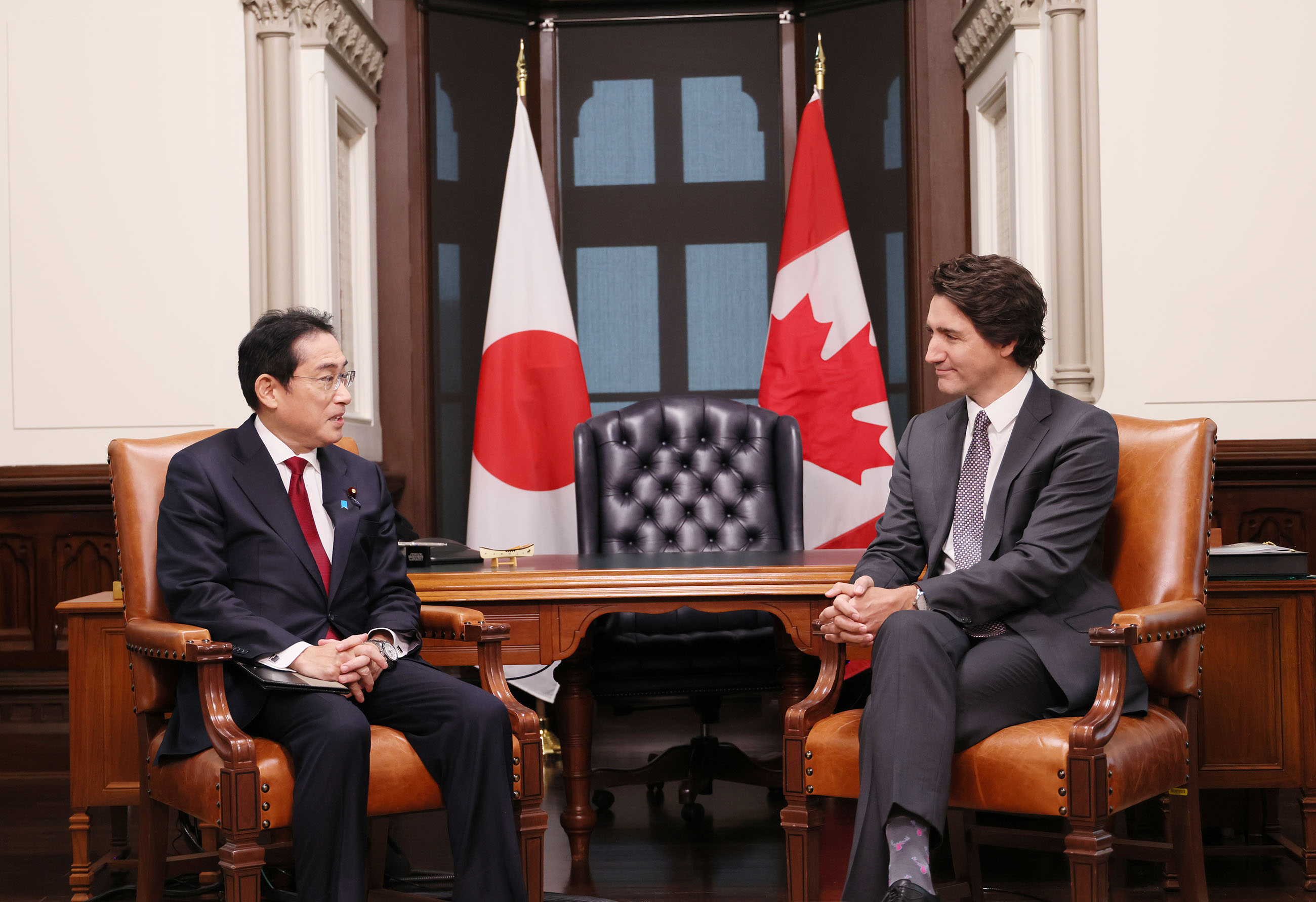
Fumio Kishida meets Canadian prime minister Justin Trudeau in Ottawa, January 2023.

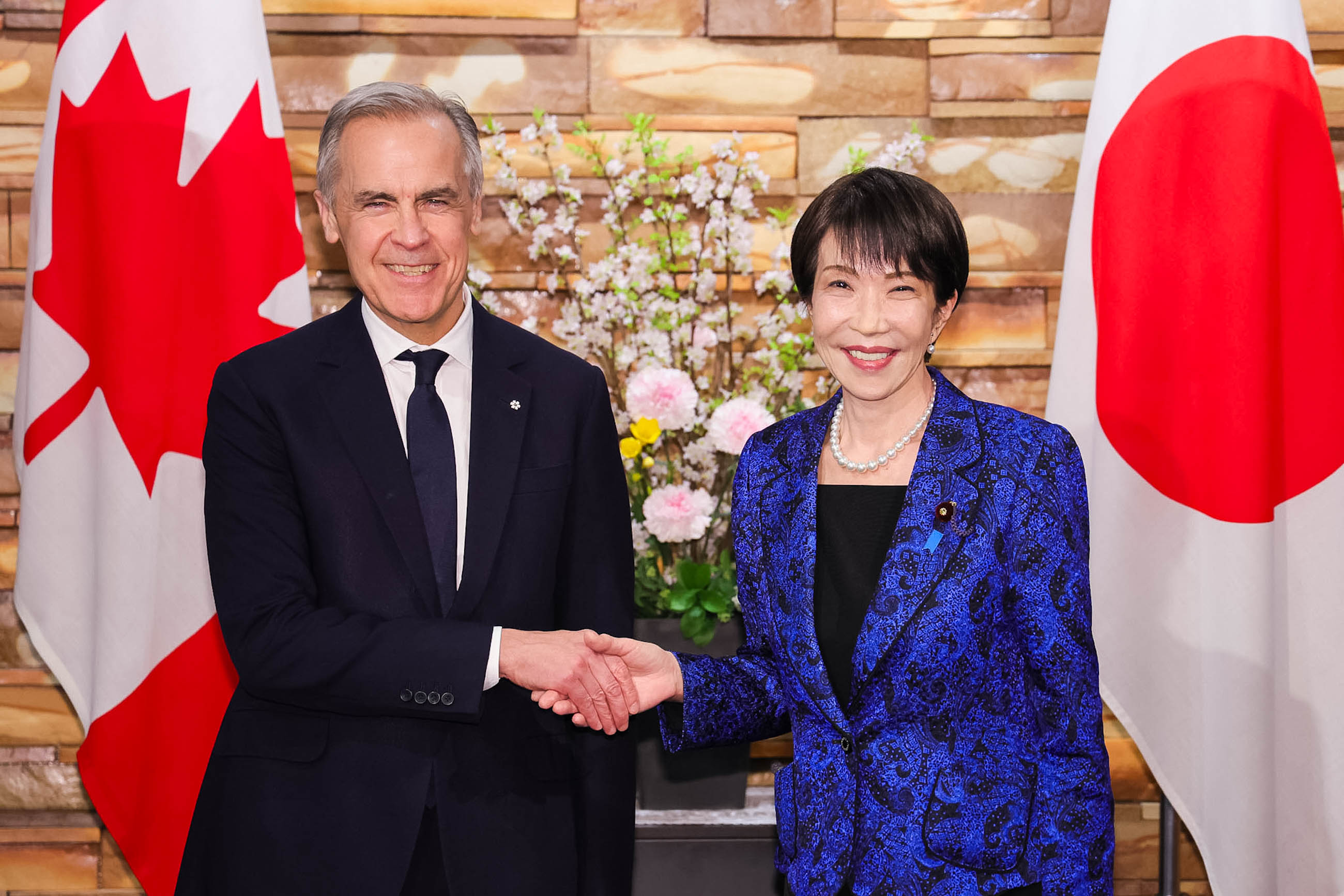
Sanae Takaichi with Canadian prime minister Mark Carney in March 2026.

== Trade ==
Canada and Japan are both members of the Comprehensive and Progressive Agreement for Trans-Pacific Partnership free trade agreement. Canada's exports to Japan totalled (CAD) $10.7 billion in 2011, while Japan's exports to Canada totalled $13 billion. As of 2011, mineral fuels and oils were Canada's main exports to Japan, while vehicle parts, nuclear machinery and electrical machinery were Japan's main exports to Canada.

Canada's Merchandise Trade with Japan, 2015

	Canadian Imports from Japan		Canadian Exports to Japan	
	Merchandise Classification	% of total imports	Merchandise Classification	% of total exports
1	Motor vehicles, trailers, bicycles, motorcycles	34.56	Ores, slag and ash	15.64
2	Boilers, mechanical appliances, etc.	27.58	Oil seeds and misc. fruit, grain, etc.	15.06
3	Electrical machinery and equipment	11.71	Wood and wood articles, charcoal	10.87
4	Optical, medical, scientific, technical instrumentation	5.08	Meat and edible meat offal	10.62
5	Rubber and rubber articles	3.57	Mineral fuels, oils	10.48
6	Iron or steel articles	2.99	Cereals	5.83
7	Aircraft and spacecraft	2.55	Woodpulp; paper or paperboard scraps	3.79
8	Pharmaceutical products	1.36	Pharmaceutical products	2.92
9	Iron and steel	1.14	Fish, crustaceans, molluscs	2.68
10	Plastic and plastic articles	1.14	Boilers, mechanical appliances, etc.	2.58
	% of Total from Japan	91.67	% of Total To Japan	80.47
	Japanese Imports as % of Cdn Total	2.76	Japanese Exports as % of Cdn Total	2.00

=== Cultural imports from Japan ===
Since the 1990s, Japanese cultural exports to Canada have included cinema and animation, video games and electronics, as well as food and music. They have gained popularity among millennial and Generation Z Canadians.

== Migration ==
Japanese migration to Canada began in the 1800s and was quite strong until restrictions were put in place at the turn of the century. Japantown in Vancouver was formerly a centre of Japanese Canadian life, although in recent years, the Japanese community is no longer based in the area.

== Multilateral organizations ==
Both countries are members of the Asia-Pacific Economic Cooperation, CPTPP, G7 and G20 major economies, OECD, United Nations, International Monetary Fund, World Trade Organization, and among others. Canada and Japan were also part of Trans-Pacific Partnership, for the boost of Indo-Pacific cooperation.

== Resident diplomatic missions ==
of Canada in Japan

- Tokyo (Embassy)

of Japan in Canada

- Ottawa (Embassy)
- Calgary (Consulate-General)
- Montreal (Consulate-General)
- Toronto (Consulate-General)
- Vancouver (Consulate-General)

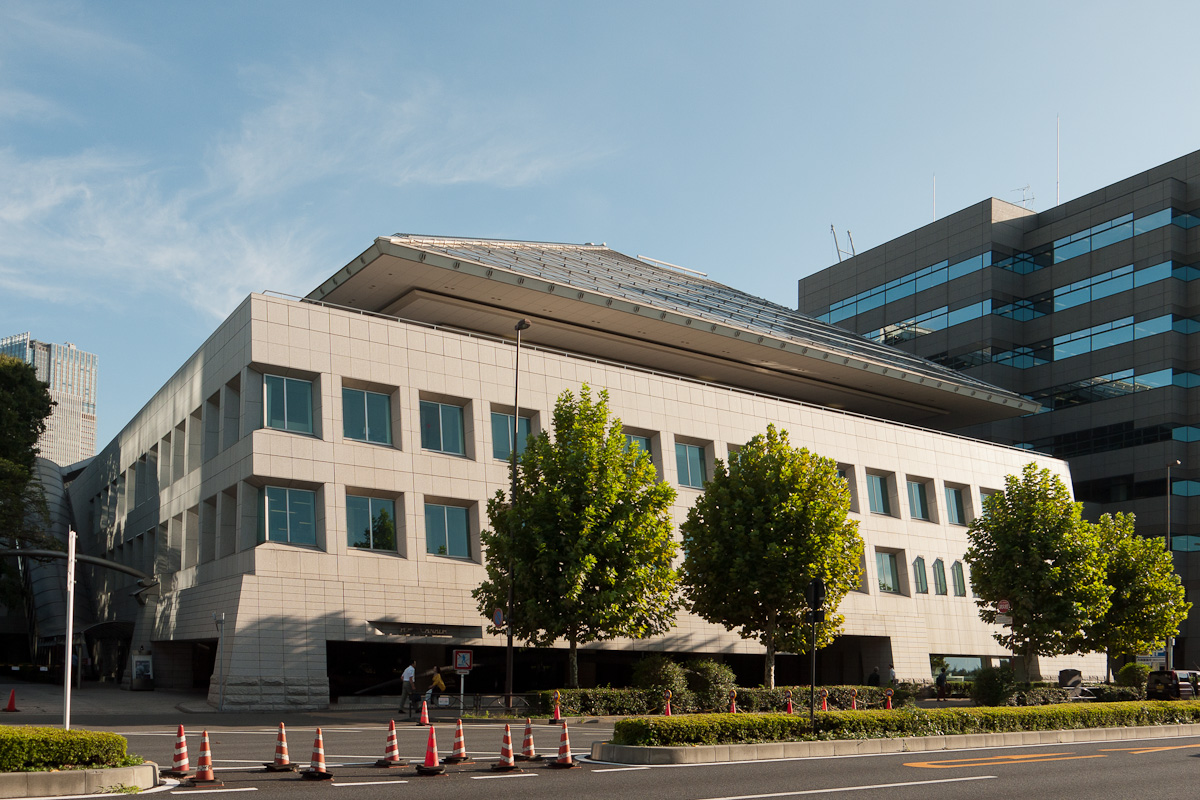
Embassy of Canada in Tokyo

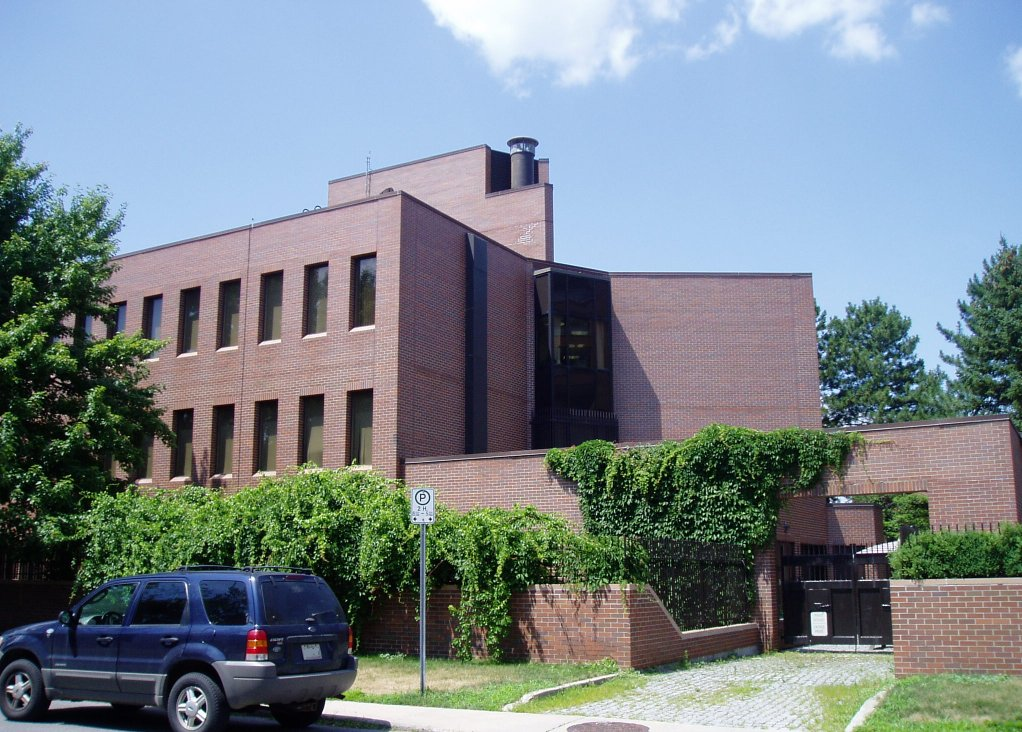
Embassy of Japan in Ottawa

== See also ==
- Foreign relations of Canada
- Foreign relations of Japan
- Embassy of Canada, Tokyo
- Embassy of Japan, Ottawa
- Ambassadors of Canada to Japan
- Asia–Canada relations
- Canadians in Japan
- Japanese Canadians
