= Ottawa South (provincial electoral district) =

Provincial electoral district in Ontario, Canada

Coordinates: 45°21′N 75°38′W

Ontario electoral district
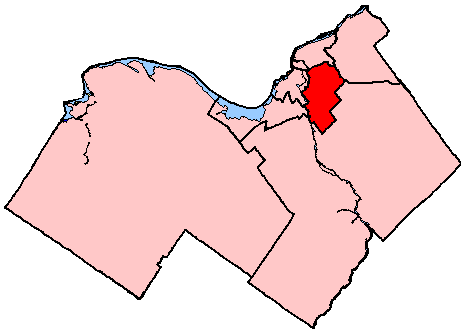
- Ottawa South in relation to other Ottawa electoral districts

Provincial electoral district
- Legislature: Legislative Assembly of Ontario
MPP
John Fraser
Liberal
- District created: 1925
- First contested: 1926
- Last contested: 2025

Demographics
- Population (2016): 121,055
- Electors (2018): 93,167
- Area (km²): 73
- Pop. density (per km²): 1,658.3
- Census division: Ottawa
- Census subdivision: Ottawa

Ottawa South (French: Ottawa-Sud) is a provincial electoral district (riding) in Ontario, Canada, in the city of Ottawa.

== History ==
The district was created in 1925 from part of Ottawa West. Prior to the 1999 election, the provincial district did not have the same borders as the federal district. Prior to the 1967 redistribution, the riding shared no common area with the present riding. Present day Ottawa South could be found in the riding of Russell prior to 1967.

After having been firmly conservative for the first 60 years, it has been in the hands of the Liberals without interruption since 1987. From 1987 to 2013, it was held by two generations of the McGuinty family–father Dalton Sr. from 1987 to 1990 and son Dalton Jr. from 1990 to 2013.

=== Members of the Provincial Parliament ===
Ottawa South
Assembly	Years	Member	Party
Riding created from Ottawa West
17th	1926–1929	Thomas Birkett	Progressive Conservative
18th	1929–1934	Arthur Ellis	Progressive Conservative
19th	1934–1937	Arthur Ellis	Progressive Conservative
20th	1937–1943	George Dunbar	Progressive Conservative
21st	1943–1945	George Dunbar	Progressive Conservative
22nd	1945–1948	George Dunbar	Progressive Conservative
23rd	1948–1951	George Dunbar	Progressive Conservative
24th	1951–1955	George Dunbar	Progressive Conservative
25th	1955–1959	George Dunbar	Progressive Conservative
26th	1959–1963	Irwin Haskett	Progressive Conservative
27th	1963–1967	Irwin Haskett	Progressive Conservative
28th	1967–1971	Irwin Haskett	Progressive Conservative
29th	1971–1975	Claude Bennett	Progressive Conservative
30th	1975–1977	Claude Bennett	Progressive Conservative
31st	1977–1981	Claude Bennett	Progressive Conservative
32nd	1981–1985	Claude Bennett	Progressive Conservative
33rd	1985–1987	Claude Bennett	Progressive Conservative
34th	1987–1990	Dalton McGuinty Sr.	Liberal
35th	1990–1995	Dalton McGuinty	Liberal
36th	1995–1999	Dalton McGuinty	Liberal
37th	1999–2003	Dalton McGuinty	Liberal
38th	2003–2007	Dalton McGuinty	Liberal
39th	2007–2011	Dalton McGuinty	Liberal
40th	2011–2013	Dalton McGuinty	Liberal
40th	2013–2014	John Fraser	Liberal
41st	2014–2018	John Fraser	Liberal
42nd	2018–2022	John Fraser	Liberal
43rd	2022–2025	John Fraser	Liberal
44th	2025–present	John Fraser	Liberal

== Election results ==
=== 2025 ===
Winning party in each polling division of Ottawa South at the 2025 Ontario general election

2025 Ontario general election
Party	Candidate	Votes	%	±%	Expenditures
Liberal	John Fraser	22,326	53.24	+8.10	$81,211
Progressive Conservative	Jan Gao	10,315	24.60	+1.41	$53,126
New Democratic	Morgan Gay	7,447	17.76	–5.99	$37,294
Green	Nira Dookeran	1,206	2.88	–1.78	$5,883
New Blue	Alex Perrier	638	1.52	–0.15	$440
Total valid votes/expense limit		41,932	99.38	–	$192,174
Total rejected, unmarked and declined ballots		260	0.62	–0.07	
Turnout		42,192	42.49	+0.01	
Eligible voters		99,305			
Liberal hold		Swing		+3.34	
Source: Elections Ontario

=== 2022 ===
Winning party in each polling division of Ottawa South at the 2022 Ontario general election

2022 Ontario general election
Party	Candidate	Votes	%	±%	Expenditures
Liberal	John Fraser	18,282	45.14	+5.51	$62,564
New Democratic	Morgan Gay	9,619	23.75	–3.44	$41,459
Progressive Conservative	Edward Dinca	9,390	23.19	–6.04	$18,192
Green	Nira Dookeran	1,885	4.65	+1.57	$381
New Blue	Martin Ince	675	1.67	–	$0
Ontario Party	Myles Dear	386	0.95	–	$0
Independent	Daniel Thomas	154	0.38	–	$0
Communist	Larry Wasslen	109	0.27	+0.05	$0
Total valid votes/expense limit		40,500	99.32	–	$134,387
Total rejected, unmarked and declined ballots		279	0.68	–0.47	
Turnout		40,779	42.48	–14.43	
Eligible voters		95,991			
Liberal hold		Swing		+4.47	
Source: Elections Ontario

=== 2018 ===
2018 Ontario general election
Party	Candidate	Votes	%	±%
Liberal	John Fraser	20,773	39.63	–10.33
Progressive Conservative	Karin Howard	15,319	29.23	–2.88
New Democratic	Eleanor Fast	14,250	27.19	+14.93
Green	Les Schram	1,618	3.09	–1.20
Libertarian	Robert Daigneault	342	0.65	+0.08
Communist	Larry Wasslen	114	0.22	–0.08
Total valid votes		52,416	98.85	
Total rejected, unmarked and declined ballots		611	1.15	+0.25
Turnout		53,027	56.92	+3.21
Eligible voters		93,167		
Liberal hold		Swing		–3.73
Source: Elections Ontario

=== 2014 ===
2014 Ontario general election
Party	Candidate	Votes	%	±%
Liberal	John Fraser	23,708	49.96	+7.63
Progressive Conservative	Matt Young	15,235	32.11	–6.60
New Democratic	Bronwyn Funiciello	5,817	12.26	–2.05
Green	Matt Lakatos-Hayward	2,034	4.29	+1.17
Libertarian	Jean-Serge Brisson	273	0.58	–0.01
Special Needs	John Redins	244	0.51	+0.22
Communist	Espoir Manirambona	139	0.29	–
Total valid votes		47,450	99.10	
Total rejected, unmarked and declined ballots		432	0.90	+0.29
Turnout		47,882	53.71	+13.33
Eligible voters		89,150		
Liberal hold		Swing		+7.11
Source: Elections Ontario

=== 2013 by-election ===
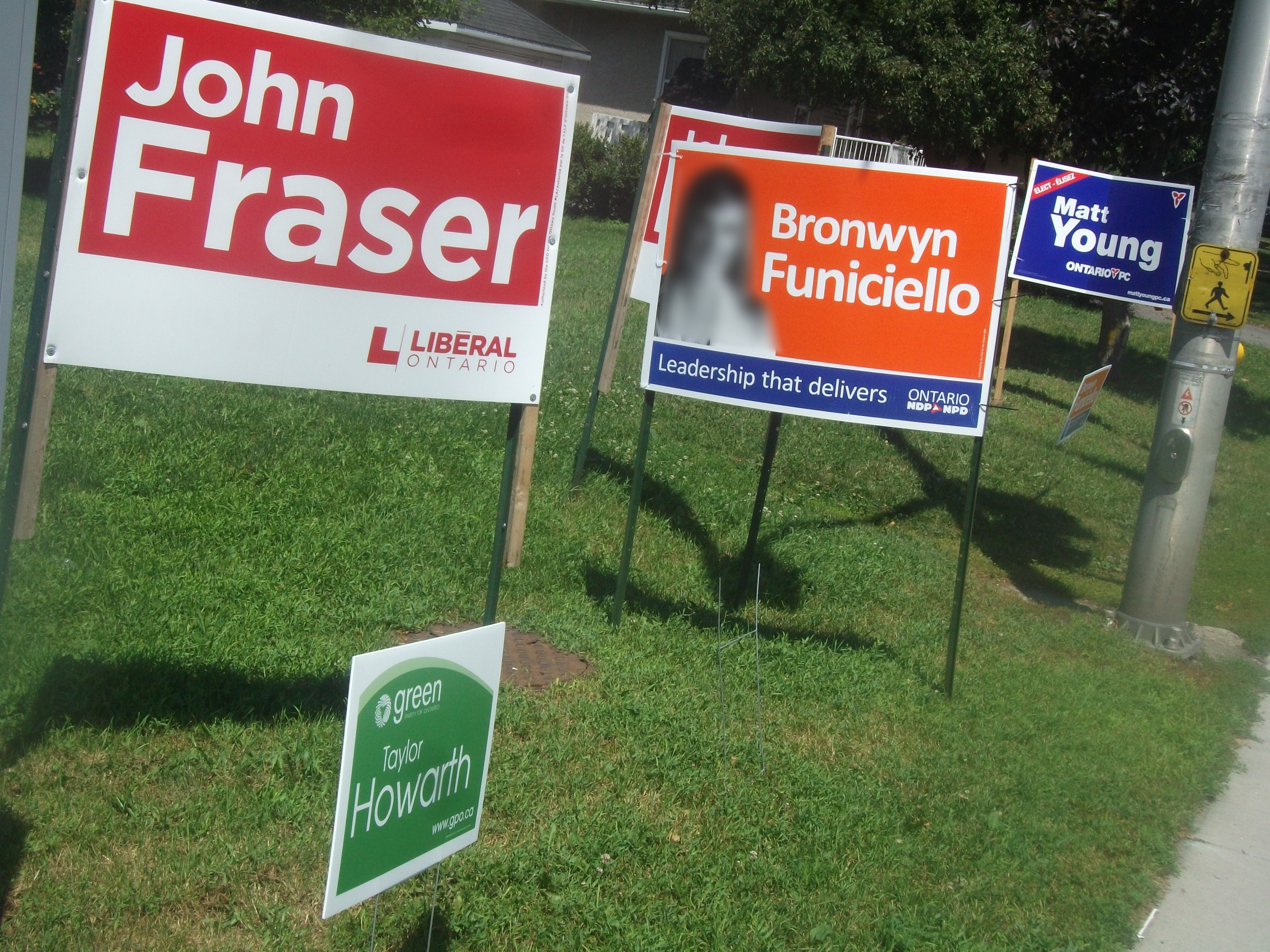
Election signs for John Fraser (Liberal), Taylor Howarth (Green), Bronwyn Funiciello (NDP) and Matt Young (PC)

Dalton McGuinty resigned the Premiership of Ontario in February 2013, but decided to stay on as MPP of Ottawa South until the next election. McGuinty changed his mind however, and resigned on June 12 amid the "gas plant scandal".

==== Opinion polls ====
Polling Firm	Date of Polling	Link	Liberal	PC	NDP	Green	Other	Type of poll	Margin of error
Forum Research	July 31	PDF	36	52	9	3	0	IVR	4%
Campaign Research	July 30	PDF	35	42	12	6	5	IVR	4.5%
Forum Research	July 24	HTML (subscription required)	34	48	12	5	1	IVR	4%
Campaign Research	July 15	PDF	37	38	17	5	2	IVR	5.1%
Forum Research	July 3	HTML (subscription required)	42	38	17	4	3	IVR	5%
Forum Research	June 13	HTML (subscription required)	34	37	22	4	2	IVR	4%

==== Results ====
Ontario provincial by-election, August 1, 2013 Resignation of Dalton McGuinty
Party	Candidate	Votes	%	±%	Expenditures
Liberal	John Fraser	14,921	42.33	–6.52	$95,351.00
Progressive Conservative	Matt Young	13,642	38.70	+5.27	$89,316.00
New Democratic	Bronwyn Funiciello	5,042	14.30	+0.91	$40,274.11
Green	Taylor Howarth	1,099	3.12	–0.11	$2,212.50
Libertarian	Jean-Serge Brisson	208	0.59	+0.03	$0.00
Special Needs	John Redins	102	0.29	–0.24	$0.00
Independent	Daniel Post	91	0.26	–	$0.00
Freedom	Dave McGruer	85	0.24	–	$0.00
Pauper	John Turmel	58	0.16	–	$0.00
Total valid votes/expense limit		35,248	99.39	–	$104,501.00
Total rejected, unmarked and declined ballots		216	0.61	+0.12	
Turnout		35,464	40.38	–10.81	
Eligible voters		87,816			
Liberal hold		Swing		–5.90	
Source: Elections Ontario

=== 1926–2011 elections ===
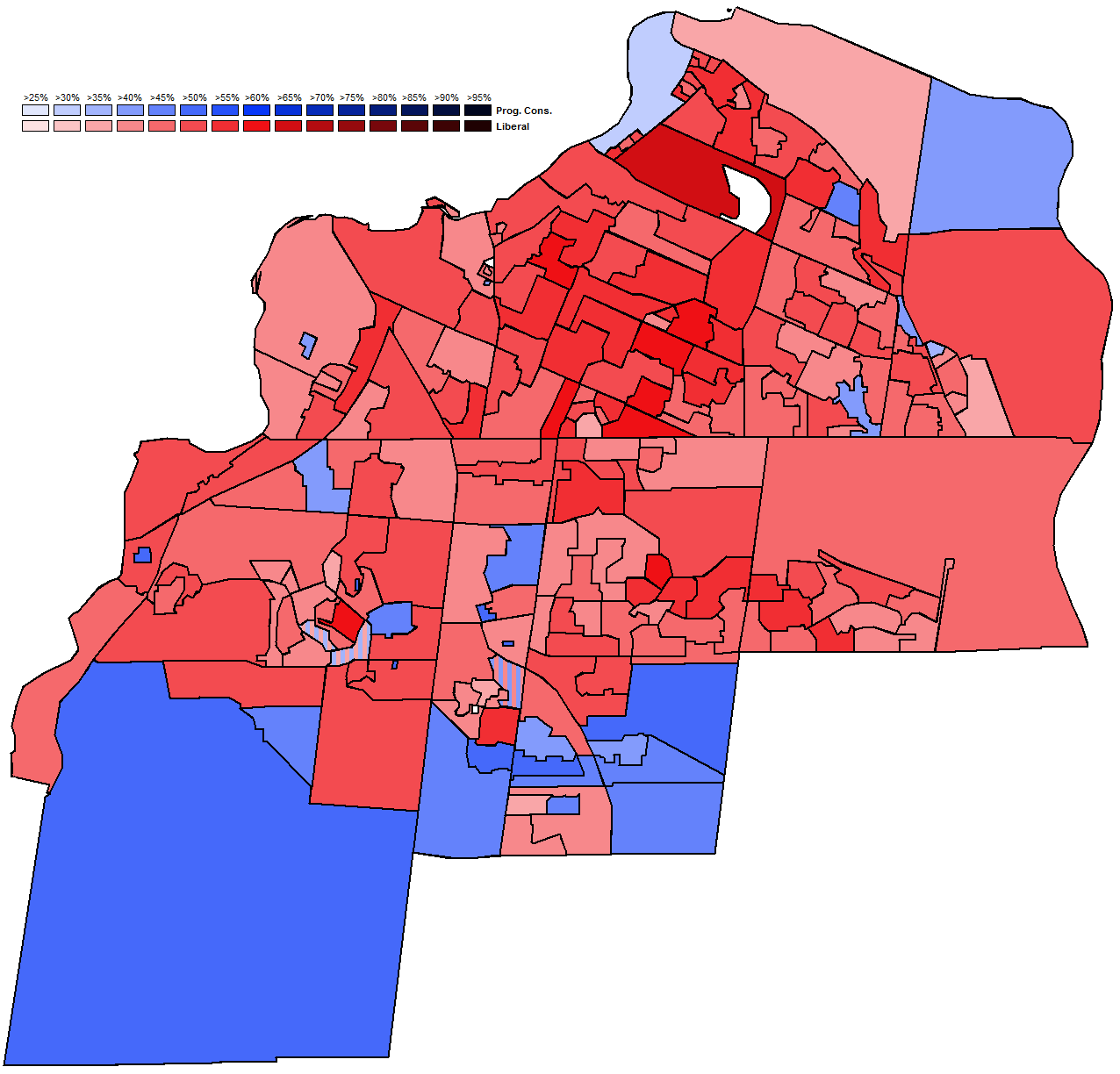
Map showing the winning party in each polling division shaded by vote percentage in the 2011 election

2011 Ontario general election
Party	Candidate	Votes	%	±%	Expenditures
Liberal	Dalton McGuinty	21,842	48.86	–1.28	$74,137.81
Progressive Conservative	Jason MacDonald	14,945	33.43	+3.77	$48,914.10
New Democratic	Wali Farah	5,988	13.39	+4.07	$15,509.77
Green	James Mihaychuk	1,442	3.23	–4.92	$3,566.26
Libertarian	Jean-Serge Brisson	252	0.56	–0.24	$0.00
Special Needs	John Redins	238	0.53	–	$0.00
Total valid votes/expense limit		44,707	99.51	–	$104,477.24
Total rejected, unmarked and declined ballots		222	0.49	–0.29	
Turnout		44,929	51.19	–5.41	
Eligible voters		87,766			
Liberal hold		Swing		–2.53	
Source: Elections Ontario

2007 Ontario general election
Party	Candidate	Votes	%	±%	Expenditures
Liberal	Dalton McGuinty	24,015	50.13	–1.57	$68,501.89
Progressive Conservative	Richard Raymond	14,206	29.66	–4.77	$80,475.86
New Democratic	Edelweiss D'Andrea	4,467	9.33	+0.29	$19,220.39
Green	John Ford	3,902	8.15	+4.49	$2,069.63
Family Coalition	David MacDonald	927	1.94	+0.76	$2,294.17
Libertarian	Jean-Serge Brisson	384	0.80	–	$118.38
Total valid votes/expense limit		47,901	99.21	–	$92,129.40
Total rejected, unmarked and declined ballots		380	0.79	+0.17	
Turnout		48,281	56.60	–2.17	
Eligible voters		85,305			
Liberal hold		Swing		+1.60	
Source: Elections Ontario

2003 Ontario general election
Party	Candidate	Votes	%	±%	Expenditures
Liberal	Dalton McGuinty	24,647	51.70	+2.11	$70,963.18
Progressive Conservative	Richard Raymond	16,413	34.43	–7.80	$75,453.48
New Democratic	James McLaren	4,306	9.03	+3.23	$12,014.97
Green	David Chernushenko	1,741	3.65	+2.07	$2,884.13
Family Coalition	John Pacheco	562	1.18	–	$9,388.75
Total valid votes/expense limit		47,669	99.38	–	$78,349.44
Total rejected, unmarked and declined ballots		296	0.62	–0.16	
Turnout		47,965	58.77	+1.03	
Eligible voters		81,614			
Liberal hold		Swing		+4.96	
Source: Elections Ontario

1999 Ontario general election
Party	Candidate	Votes	%	±%	Expenditures
Liberal	Dalton McGuinty	22,707	49.59	–3.76	$62,090.51
Progressive Conservative	Mike Nicholson	19,337	42.23	+12.41	$20,397.04
New Democratic	James McLaren	2,655	5.80	–8.86	$14,683.16
Green	George Brown	724	1.58	+0.26	$0.00
Independent	Mag Carson	243	0.53	–	$8.09
Natural Law	James M. Hea	121	0.26	–0.58	$0.00
Total valid votes/expense limit		45,787	99.22	–	$76,725.12
Total rejected, unmarked and declined ballots		360	0.78	–0.01	
Turnout		46,147	57.74	–8.77	
Eligible voters		79,922			
Liberal hold		Swing		–8.09	
Note: Boundaries significantly adjusted. Percentage change not adjusted to reflected redistribution.
Source: Elections Ontario

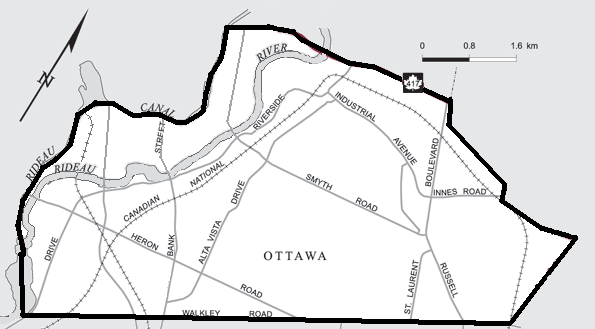
Map of the Ottawa South provincial electoral district for the 1987, 1990, and 1995 elections

1995 Ontario general election
Party	Candidate	Votes	%	±%	Expenditures
Liberal	Dalton McGuinty	15,418	53.35	+7.48	$38,581.00
Progressive Conservative	Linda Thom	8,618	29.82	+5.31	$28,456.94
New Democratic	Margaret Armstrong	4,235	14.65	–11.27	$16,082.17
Green	Karen Fyson	383	1.33	–0.70	$0.00
Natural Law	Wayne Foster	245	0.85	–	$0.00
Total valid votes/expense limit		28,899	99.21	–	$44,698.00
Total rejected, unmarked and declined ballots		229	0.79	–0.12	
Turnout		29,128	66.51	–2.05	
Eligible voters		43,793			
Liberal hold		Swing		+1.09	
Source: Elections Ontario

1990 Ontario general election
Party	Candidate	Votes	%	±%
Liberal	Dalton McGuinty	13,845	45.87	–5.01
New Democratic	Margaret Armstrong	7,826	25.93	+6.67
Progressive Conservative	Darrel Kent	7,399	24.51	–5.36
Green	Stephen Johns	612	2.03	–
Family Coalition	David R. Fitzpatrick	503	1.67	–
Total valid votes		30,185	99.09	
Total rejected, unmarked and declined ballots		276	0.91	+0.36
Turnout		30,461	68.56	+1.01
Eligible voters		44,429		
Liberal hold		Swing		–5.84
Source: Elections Ontario

1987 Ontario general election
Party	Candidate	Votes	%	±%
Liberal	Dalton McGuinty Sr.	15,952	50.88	+15.53
Progressive Conservative	Michael McSweeney	9,365	29.87	–9.54
New Democratic	Penina Coopersmith	6,038	19.26	–5.99
Total valid votes		31,355	99.46	
Total rejected ballots		171	0.54	+0.03
Turnout		31,526	67.55	+3.99
Eligible voters		46,673		
Liberal gain from Progressive Conservative		Swing		+12.53
Source: Elections Ontario

1985 Ontario general election
Party	Candidate	Votes	%	±%
Progressive Conservative	Claude Bennett	12,971	39.41	–10.56
Liberal	Andrew Caddell	11,634	35.34	+6.34
New Democratic	John Smart	8,311	25.25	+5.07
Total valid votes		32,916	99.49	
Total rejected ballots		170	0.51	+0.11
Turnout		33,086	63.56	+3.45
Eligible voters		52,058		
Progressive Conservative hold		Swing		–8.45
Source: Elections Ontario

1981 Ontario general election
Party	Candidate	Votes	%	±%
Progressive Conservative	Claude Bennett	15,218	49.97	+0.60
Liberal	Robert Dyck	8,832	29.00	+3.05
New Democratic	Chris Chilton	6,146	20.18	−2.80
Independent	Ray Turmel	259	0.85	
Total valid votes		30,455	100.0	−9.76

1977 Ontario general election
Party	Candidate	Votes	%	±%
Progressive Conservative	Claude Bennett	16,662	49.37	+6.22
New Democratic	Eileen Scotton	8,759	25.95	−6.48
Liberal	Patricia Thorpe	7,754	22.98	−1.45
Independent	Michael Holton	574	1.70	
Total valid votes		33,749	100.0	−1.39

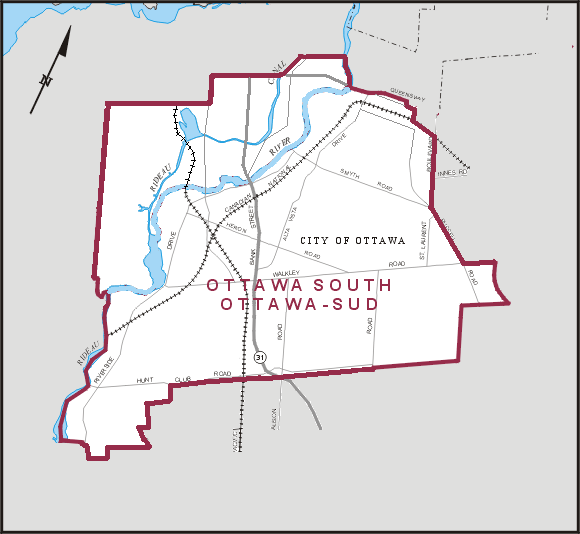
Map of the Ottawa South provincial electoral district for the 1967, 1971, and 1975 elections

1975 Ontario general election
Party	Candidate	Votes	%	±%
Progressive Conservative	Claude Bennett	14,767	43.15	−8.52
New Democratic	Eileen Scotton	11,099	32.43	+7.88
Liberal	Patricia Thorpe	8,360	24.43	+0.64
Total valid votes		34,226	100.0	−21.02

1971 Ontario general election
Party	Candidate	Votes	%	±%
Progressive Conservative	Claude Bennett	22,392	51.67	+4.16
New Democratic	Don Francis	10,638	24.55	+15.62
Liberal	Ian Kimmerly	10,307	23.78	−19.78
Total valid votes		43,337	100.0	+52.84

1967 Ontario general election
Party	Candidate	Votes	%	±%
Progressive Conservative	Irwin Haskett	13,472	47.51	−6.99
Liberal	Joseph McDonald	12,351	43.56	+3.40
New Democratic	William Hardy	2,531	8.93	+3.59
Total valid votes		28,354	100.0	+21.95

1954–1966: Ward 5 (Old Ottawa South, the Glebe) and that part of Wards 4 (Centretown) and 6 (Dalhousie Ward) south of Sparks Street and Wellington Street (West).

1963 Ontario general election
Party	Candidate	Votes	%	±%
Progressive Conservative	Irwin Haskett	12,671	54.50	+2.84
Liberal	Joseph McDonald	9,338	40.16	−4.06
New Democratic	Peter Hopwood	1,241	5.34	+1.22
Total valid votes		23,250	100.0	−7.54

1959 Ontario general election
Party	Candidate	Votes	%	±%
Progressive Conservative	Irwin Haskett	12,989	51.66	−2.28
Liberal	Archibald M. Laidlaw	11,119	44.22	+2.35
Co-operative Commonwealth	John Fisher	1,037	4.12	+0.97
Total valid votes		25,145	100.0	−4.15

1955 Ontario general election
Party	Candidate	Votes	%	±%
Progressive Conservative	George H. Dunbar	14,151	53.94	−2.04
Liberal	Kenneth Fogarty	10,984	41.87	+6.88
Co-operative Commonwealth	Allen Schroeder	826	3.15	−5.88
Labor–Progressive	Daniel Nerenberg	273	1.04	
Total valid votes		26,234	100.0	−26.23

1933–1954: Capital Ward, Dalhousie Ward, Central Ward, Wellington Ward, that part of Riverdale Ward west of Main Street and that part of Elmdale Ward east of Parkdale Avenue.

1951 Ontario general election
Party	Candidate	Votes	%	±%
Progressive Conservative	George H. Dunbar	19,908	55.98	+0.85
Liberal	Kenneth Fogarty	12,444	34.99	+6.45
Co-operative Commonwealth	Melville Fleming	3,212	9.03	−5.95
Total valid votes		35,564	100.0	+3.43

1948 Ontario general election
Party	Candidate	Votes	%	±%
Progressive Conservative	George H. Dunbar	18,955	55.13	−5.79
Liberal	William R. Burnett	9,813	28.54	+3.23
Co-operative Commonwealth	Milton C. Anderson	5,151	14.98	+1.69
Union of Electors	Terrence O'Reilly	279	0.81	
Socialist Labor	William Leckie	185	0.54	+0.06
Total valid votes		34,383	100.0	−11.30

1945 Ontario general election
Party	Candidate	Votes	%	±%
Progressive Conservative	George H. Dunbar	23,616	60.92	+16.87
Liberal	George Pushman	9,813	25.31	−9.24
Co-operative Commonwealth	Eugene Forsey	5,151	13.29	−7.42
Socialist Labor	E. Irving	185	0.48	−0.21
Total valid votes		38,765	100.0	+43.87

1943 Ontario general election
Party	Candidate	Votes	%	±%
Progressive Conservative	George H. Dunbar	11,870	44.05	−6.15
Liberal	Leonard L. Coulter	9,311	34.56	−13.08
Co-operative Commonwealth	Walter B. Mann	5,579	20.71	
Socialist Labor	Edward A. Irving	185	0.69	−0.11
Total valid votes		26,945	100.0	−22.45

1937 Ontario general election
Party	Candidate	Votes	%	±%
Conservative	George H. Dunbar	17,443	50.20	+2.64
Liberal	John H. Putnam	16,550	47.63	+0.76
Communist	Harry Binder	408	1.17	+0.64
Socialist Labor	Peter Leckie	276	0.79	
Independent	James C. Sidey	69	0.20	
Total valid votes		34,746	100.0	−2.69

1934 Ontario general election
Party	Candidate	Votes	%
Conservative	Arthur Ellis	16,983	47.56
Liberal	Percy O. Wilson	16,737	46.87
Co-operative Commonwealth	William Henry Chapman	1,531	4.29
Communist	John Lyons	192	0.54
Independent	Joseph B. O'Reilly	165	0.46
Independent	Duncan McNaughton	100	0.28
Total valid votes		35,708	100.0

1925-1933: Dalhousie Ward and Capital Ward

1929 Ontario general election
Party	Candidate	Votes	%
Conservative	Arthur Ellis	Acclaimed	

1926 Ontario general election
Party	Candidate	Votes	%
Conservative	Thomas Miles Birkett	9,171	62.27
Liberal	Robert R. Sparks	5,556	37.73
Total valid votes		14,727	100.0

== 2007 electoral reform referendum ==
2007 Ontario electoral reform referendum
Side	Votes	%
First Past the Post	30,718	65.84
Mixed Member Proportional	15,941	34.16
Total valid votes	46,659	100.0
Source "Referendum Statistical Results" (PDF). Archived from the original (PDF) on June 8, 2012.

== Riding associations ==
Riding associations are the local branches of the provincial political parties:

Party	Association Name	President	HQ Address	Neighbourhood
Green	Green Party of Ontario Ottawa South	Unknown	Unknown	Unknown
Progressive Conservative Party of Ontario	Ottawa South Progressive Conservative Association	Alan Wilde	10 The Masters Drive, Ottawa, ON.	Uplands
Ontario Liberal Party	Ottawa South Provincial Liberal Association	Carolyn Kropp	Unknown	Unknown
Ontario New Democratic Party	Ontario New Democrat Party Ottawa South	Unknown	Unknown	Unknown

Sources

- Map of riding for 2018 election

== See also ==
- List of Ontario provincial electoral districts
- Canadian provincial electoral districts
