= Canadians in Japan =

Ethnic group in Japan

在日カナダ人

Total population
- 13,034 (as of December 2025)

Regions with significant populations
- Tokyo, Kanagawa, Osaka, Chiba, Kobe, Hokkaido

Languages
- Canadian English • Canadian French • Japanese

Canadians in Japan consist of individuals with Canadian nationality living in Japan under a status of residence.

== Details ==
Japan has the tenth-largest population of Canadians living outside Canada. As of December 2025, there were 13,034 Canadian residents in Japan, making them the second-largest North American group of residents after those from the United States. This figure does not include individuals naturalized as Japanese citizens, short-term residents, or Japanese people with Canadian ancestry who do not hold Canadian citizenship. (Japan does not allow its citizens over 18 to have dual citizenship.)

In December 2025, 4,464 of them held permanent resident status, while 2,241 were residing as spouses of Japanese nationals.

== See also ==
- Canada-Japan relations
- Embassy of Canada, Tokyo
- Canadian International School (Tokyo)
- Columbia International School
- Canadian Academy
- Japanese Canadians
