= Embassy of Japan, Ottawa =

Japanese embassy in Ottawa, Canada

Embassy of Japan in Canada
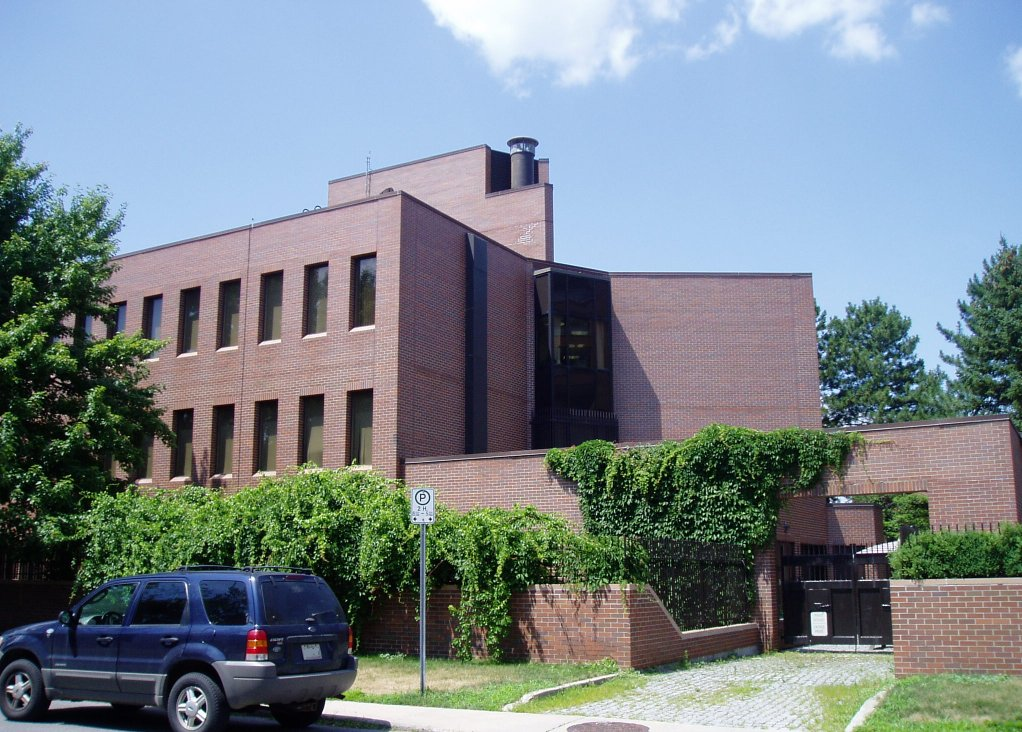
- Address: 255 Sussex Drive; Ottawa, Ontario; K1N 9E6
- Coordinates: 45.433245°N 75.698730°W
- Ambassador: H.E. Kanji Yamanouchi

The Embassy of Japan in Canada (Japanese: 在カナダ日本国大使館 Zai Kanada Nihon-koku Taishikan; French: Ambassade du Japon au Canada) is located in Ottawa, Ontario. Since 1978 the chancery has been located at 255 Sussex Drive near the Lester B. Pearson Building in Ottawa. The ambassadorial residence is at Waterstone (Alan Keefer, architect, built 1928-31), one of Ottawa's largest mansions in Rockcliffe Park.

== History ==
Japan first opened a consulate in Vancouver in 1889 and the embassy opened in 1928. In 1931 the Legation was housed at the Victoria Building (legation was established in 1928). With the outbreak of war, the Japanese diplomats were expelled in 1941 and the embassy was not reopened until 1951. The embassy today also has consulates in Vancouver, Toronto, Montreal, and Calgary. The current ambassador is Kanji Yamanouchi (山野内 勘二 Yamanouchi Kanji).

== Programs ==
In 2015, the Japanese Embassy selected two Canadians of Japanese ancestry to attend enthronement of Japanese emperor Naruhito at the Imperial Palace in Tokyo.

== See also ==
- Canadian Embassy, Tokyo
- Canadians in Japan
- Japanese Canadians
- Canada–Japan relations
