= Lady Stanley of Alderley (disambiguation) =

Henrietta Stanley, Baroness Stanley of Alderley (1807–1895), was a British-Canadian political hostess and educational campaigner.

Lady Stanley of Alderley or Baroness Stanley of Alderley may also refer to:

- Maria Stanley, Baroness Stanley of Alderley (1771–1863), British letter writer and liberal advocate
- Margaret Evelyn Stanley, Baroness Stanley of Alderley (1875–1964), British philanthropist and founder of the Victorian division of the Australian Red Cross

== See also ==
- Baron Stanley of Alderley
- Lady Stanley (disambiguation)
