= Ian G. McKay =

Canadian executive (born 1963)

His Excellency Ian G. McKay

Canadian Ambassador to Japan
- Incumbent
- Assumed office April 15, 2021
- Prime Minister: Justin Trudeau; Mark Carney
- Preceded by: Ian Burney

Personal details
- Born: 1963 (age 62–63)

Ian Gerard McKay (born 1963) is a Canadian executive who has worked extensively in business and politics. On April 15, 2021, he was appointed as Canada's Ambassador to Japan by Global Affairs Canada following his three-year tenure as CEO of Invest in Canada. McKay is also recognized for assisting in the successful final negotiations for the Trans Pacific Partnership as the Prime Minister's Special Envoy to Japan.

== Early life and education ==
McKay was born in Kamloops, British Columbia, and was raised in Penticton, British Columbia. He is the youngest of five boys. In July 1980, he was sent by his hometown to live in the town of Ikeda, on Japan’s island of Hokkaido. At the age of 16, he developed a lifelong appreciation for the country and for its language. Upon graduating from Penticton Secondary School in 1981, he returned to Japan as a Rotary Youth Exchange student. Following his studies, McKay worked and lived in Japan over the course of 14 years.

McKay studied Political Science and Asian Studies at the University of Victoria and the University of British Columbia; he received an MBA from Queen's University in Kingston, Ontario, in 2005.

== Business background ==
Immediately following his studies at the University of British Columbia in 1987, McKay was recruited as a derivatives broker by EuroBrokers Investment Inc. in New York. Subsequently, he was seconded to EuroBrokers Tokyo office, becoming managing director in 1994. In 1998, McKay went to London and became joint managing director of EuroBrokers International in London. From 2006 - 2009, McKay was Director of Business Development for ICAP Capital Markets (Canada) Inc, working in the energy markets in Vancouver and Calgary.

Following 18 years in the financial markets, working in New York City, Tokyo, London and Vancouver, McKay served as a Senior Policy Advisor to three federal cabinet ministers in Ottawa. From March 2010 to May 2013 he served as the National Director for the Liberal Party of Canada. Following his time in Ottawa, McKay returned to Vancouver where he served five years as the CEO of the Vancouver Economic Commission, the City of Vancouver's economic development agency from 2013 until 2018.

== Political involvement ==
McKay entered federal politics as a candidate for the Liberal Party of Canada in the 2000 general election, running as a candidate in the riding of West Vancouver-Sunshine Coast. He also served as the treasurer for the British Columbia Liberal Party.

In 2001, McKay moved to Ottawa and served as senior policy advisor to three federal cabinet ministers; Minister of Industry, Allan Rock; Leader of the Government in the Senate, Jack Austin; and David Emerson, Minister of Industry. In 2010, McKay was appointed as the National Director of the Liberal Party of Canada.
