= Lady Stanley Institute for Trained Nurses =

Nursing school in Ottawa, Ontario, Canada

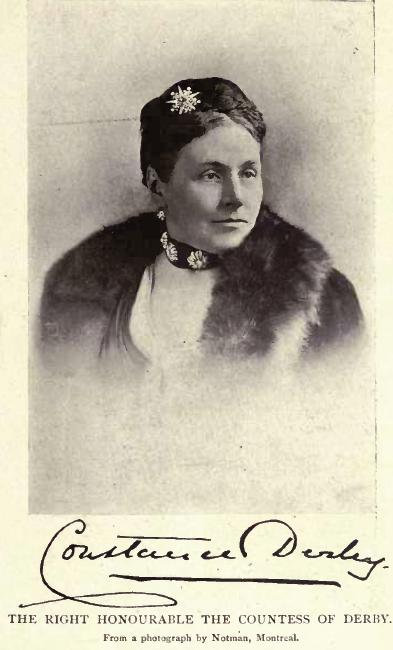
Lady Stanley, by William Notman

The Lady Stanley Institute for Trained Nurses was the first nursing school in Ottawa, Ontario, located at the corner of Rideau Street and Wurtemburg Street along the Rideau River.

It was founded in 1890 by Constance Stanley, Baroness Stanley of Preston and later Countess of Derby. She was the wife of Frederick Arthur Stanley, 16th Earl of Derby, who served as Governor General of Canada from 1888 to 1893.

On February 18, 1890, at a meeting of representative citizens of Ottawa convened at the City Hall on the invitation of Lady Stanley of Preston, it was suggested the establishment of an institution for training nurses. Lady Stanley's idea of such institution was affirmed and approved by formal resolution. A provisional executive committee was appointed during that meeting.

Provisional Committee - 1890	
HONORARY PRESIDENT	Her Excellency The Lady Stanley of Preston
HONORARY VICE PRESIDENT	The Baroness Macdonald of Earnscliffe
CHAIRMAN	Sandford Fleming, C.C., C.M.C.
HONORARY TREASURER	George Burn
HONORARY SECRETARY	John P. Featherston
HONORARY SOLICITOR	Alexander Ferguson, Q.C.

COMMITTEE: Samuel Howell, John A. Cameron, John C. Edwards, W. Lake Marler, J. Travers Lewis, F.P. Bronson, C. Berkeley Powell, William Whillans, Thomas Birkett, Alderman McLean, W.A. Allan Bate, E. Seybold, The Honorable Mr. Justice Patterson, The Honorable Mr Justice Burbidge, Mr Sheriff Edward Moore, Alonzo Wright, M.P., John R. Booth, W. C. Edwards, M.P. G.B. Pattee, A.J. Stephens, and T.C. Keefer, C.E.

The first step of that committee was to decide that the institution is named "The Lady Stanley Institute for Trained Nurses". Lady Stanley was appointed as honorary president and the Baroness Macdonald of Earnschliffe as vice president. The committee then ascertained an approximated amount of money of $20,000 to acquire a site and to construct a suitable building. It was then decided to appeal to the public for subscriptions:

Within the past thirty years a marked improvement has been made in the nursing of the sick, both in hospitals and in private homes. This improvement is mainly due to the training that has been made available to a large number of women in the various Institutes or Schools for trained nurses established in almost every leading city in Great Britain, the United States and Canada, whereby they can obtain a knowledge of disease and its treatment, and of various duties required of a nurse in the sick room sufficient to enable them to carry on their good work with intelligent and watchfull care. The City of Ottawa at present stands almost alone among the cities of any size in Canada, in not affording an opportunity to those desiring to acquire a knowledge of the proper nursing of the sick; and until within the last few weeks no effort has been made to establish in Ottawa a school to train women in this much needed branch of education. The Institute will be for the education of women as nurses, and will afford a home not only for those in course of training but for many who will devote themselves when trained to the nursing of the sick.

It is almost needless to say how invaluable are the services of a properly trained nurse in cases of severe or long continued illness, whether such services are rendered by a mother or daughter in her own family or by a professional nurse. They not only minister greatly to the comfort of the patient, but aid and assist in a very great degree the efforts of the attending physician.

On June 14, 1890, the provisional committee called a meeting of the subscribers after receiving enough funds to start the project. The committee submitted a draft Declaration and Certificate of Incorporation to which they received their approval. The Charter of Incorporation was secured during the next days.

On June 17, 1890, the Certificate of Incorporation under the Act respecting Benevolent, Provident and other Societies, chapter 172 of the Revised Statutes of Ontario, 1887 for the Society of The Lady Stanley institute for Trained Nurses was examined and certified by William Aird Ross, Judge of the County Court of the County of Carleton of the Province of Ontario. It was filed on the same day by Robert Lees, Clerk of the Peace in and for the County of Carleton of the Province of Ontario. The authorised objects of the Institute are set forth in Clause Two of the Declaration or Certificate of Incorporation, as follows: The establishment and maintenance at the City of Ottawa of a School or Institute for Training Nurses for the sick, and a home of residence for trained nurses, and as incidental thereto the providing of trained nurses for those who require their services.

On June 21, 1890, the provisional committee handed over the work of establishing the institute to a board of directors elected by the Subscribers.

During the summer 1890, the committee selected and purchased a site at the corner of Rideau Street and Wurtemberg Street in Ottawa at the cost of $950, which the board considered a very reasonable price. It was situated beside the General Protestant Hospital, which was itself located at the corner of Rideau Street and Charlotte Street. The committee then obtained, accepted and approved of a plan and specifications. It called for tenders for the whole work of construction, and entered into contracts based upon the best offers submitted by September 11 from which time the building was erected. By January 26, 1891, at the First Annual Report, the sum of $13,885.50 was promised of which $11,600.50 was paid up. All the equipment and furniture of the institute were provided by the honorary president and vice president with the assistance of a large number of women. The institute was furnished at no cost to the funds of the corporation. The directors recorded the following: "the great obligations under which the Institute is placed to Her Excellency and to Lady Macdonald for the great interest which they have shown in the scheme, and their untiring efforts towards making it a success."

By May 21, 1891, the institute was completed for the sum of $15,830 well under the budgeted amount. It was fully equipped and furnished for the sum of $3,000 free of charge to the corporation. An unknown friend of the institute gave $4,000 to secure the cost of maintenance during the start of its operation.

On May 7, 1891, the board of trustees appointed Miss Gertrude Warren Moore as lady superintendent to the institute. She was a Canadian who graduated as a trained nurse at Bellevue Hospital in New York, US. She was highly recommended to the board by the superintendent of the Bellevue Hospital, by many physicians and many others who were able to determine her ability to assume her responsibility as Superintendent of the Lady Stanley Institute for Trained Nurses. Two others graduated nurses were employed to assist the superintendent nurse in taking charge of the hospital work. A third nurse was temporarily employed for the same reason. However, the board expected that in a few months only one nurse will suffice. It was expected that the nurse in training will have received enough experience to find among them one able to take the position of head nurse. This will make a considerable saving on the expenses. Currently, the institute had eight nurses and two probationers. It was expecting to increase to twelve to fifteen nurses in training.

On June 1, 1891, an agreement was reached between the directors of the Protestant General Hospital and the directors of the Lady Stanley Institute for the hospital to take charge of and conducting the nursing therein, and incidental thereto, for the admission of the pupil nurses of the institute to the Wards of that Institution. Furthermore, the nurses have attended outside patients and they have done district work of a charitable character as part of their training. The Lady Stanley Institute for Trained Nurses was opened in July 1891.

The directors were expecting to receive a source of revenue for the services of the nurses sent to outside patients in private homes. This would help counterbalance the expenditures met in administrating the institute. It was hoped the Institute would, within the next year (1892), been able to increase considerably its revenue while its expenditures would be greatly reduced. The board also arranged to deliver many courses during the winter. These courses were lectures given by members of the medical profession. These lectures were free of charge for the nurses in training. They also were benefiting to all women who chose to attend after subscribing to it.

The school merged into Ottawa Civic Hospital School of Nursing (1924-1974) in 1924. After 1974 nursing training was transferred to post secondary institutions like Algonquin College Vanier School of Nursing.

== See also ==
- Nursing in Canada
