= Bruce Irving Rankin =

Canadian diplomat (1918–1986)

Bruce Irving Rankin, OC (1918 – July 28, 1986) was a Canadian diplomat.

== Background ==
Born in Brandon, Manitoba, Rankin was raised in Saskatchewan and received a B.Com. degree from the University of Alberta in 1941 and studied at the National Defence College in Kingston. Rankin received an honorary degree from the University of Alberta in 1983. After his retirement he lived in Aurora, Ontario. He had a wife, Mona and three daughters. Rankin is related to Glen Shortliffe, a former federal clerk of the Privy Council and a diplomat.

Rankin served in the Royal Canadian Navy in the Pacific and Atlantic oceans in the Second World War and obtained the rank of lieutenant commander.

== Foreign service ==
Rankin joined the foreign service in 1945. As a young commercial secretary for Canada in Shanghai, he was obliged to leave China in 1949 and successfully ran the Nationalist China blockade in a British vessel. Rankin later represented Canada in Australia, China, India, Spain and Switzerland. He was appointment ambassador to Venezuela and the Dominican Republic from 1964 to 1970, consul general to New York City from 1970 to 1976. Rankin was the Canadian representative on the Economic and Social Council of the United Nations, and for the next six years Ambassador to the Economic and Financial Committee of the U.N. General Assembly, serving as chair in 1972.

His diplomatic career was capped by his appointment as Ambassador to Japan from 1976 to 1981. During this period British Columbia's trade and economic relations with Japan increased dramatically through the establishment of such programmes as the North East Coal Project, one of the largest such developments in Canadian history. For his efforts, Rankin received the Order of Canada in 1985.

Unlike many diplomats Rankin often spoke out publicly on political questions during his 36-year career in the foreign service. For instance almost 20 years before Canada recognised China, he was speaking out about the advantages such a recognition would bring Canada.

== See also ==
- List of ambassadors of Canada to Japan
- List of University of Alberta honorary degree recipients
