= Columbia International School =

Coordinates: 35°48′0.12″N 139°30′30.21″E

- コロンビアインターナショナルスクール

Location
- 153 Matsugo; Tokorozawa, Saitama, 359-0027; Japan

Information
- Established: 1988
- Enrollment: 270
- Website: http://www.columbia-ca.co.jp

Columbia International School (コロンビアインターナショナルスクール) is an international school located in Matsugo (松郷), Tokorozawa, Saitama. It has a kindergarten division, elementary division, junior and senior high school division.

The school uses the curriculum of the Province of Ontario, Canada, and is accredited by Japanese Board of Education, Ontario Ministry of Education, and Western Association of Schools and Colleges (WASC).
