= Joseph-Alphida Crête =

Canadian politician

Member of the Canadian Parliament for Saint-Maurice—Laflèche
- In office 1935–1945
- Preceded by: District was established in 1933
- Succeeded by: René Hamel

Member of the Legislative Assembly of Quebec for Laviolette
- In office 1931–1935
- Preceded by: District was established in 1930
- Succeeded by: Romulus Ducharme

Personal details
- Born: July 9, 1890 Saint-Stanislas, Quebec
- Died: April 20, 1964 (aged 73) Grand-Mère, Quebec
- Party: Liberal
- Other political affiliations: Quebec Liberal Party

Joseph-Alphida Crête (French pronunciation: [ʒozɛf alfida kʁɛt]; July 9, 1890 – April 20, 1964) was a Liberal Member of the Legislative Assembly of Quebec and the House of Commons of Canada.

== Early life ==
He was born on July 9, 1890, in Saint-Stanislas, Quebec and worked as an optician before entering politics.

== Provincial politics ==
Crête successfully ran as a Quebec Liberal Party candidate for the district of Laviolette in the 1931 provincial election.

== Federal politics ==
Shortly before the 1935 federal election, Crête resigned his provincial seat and became Liberal Party of Canada candidate for the district of Saint-Maurice—Laflèche. He won.

He was re-elected in the 1940 election, but was defeated in the 1945 election by Bloc Populaire candidate René Hamel.
