= Joseph-Adolphe Richard =

Canadian politician

Joseph-Adolphe Richard (February 14, 1887 – July 12, 1964) was a Liberal Member of the House of Commons of Canada.

He was born on February 14, 1887, in Saint-Grégoire, Quebec, and was a contractor.

== Provincial Politics ==
Richard ran as a Liberal candidate in the provincial district of Saint-Maurice in the 1944 election. He received 23% of the vote and finished third, behind Marc Trudel of the Union Nationale and René Hamel of the Bloc populaire.

== Member of Parliament ==
In the 1949 election, Richard successfully ran as a Liberal candidate for the federal district of Saint-Maurice—Laflèche, against Hamel, who was the incumbent.

He was re-elected in 1953, 1957 and 1958, but remained a backbencher.

He lost his re-election bid in 1962, against Social Credit candidate Gérard Lamy.

Under his tenure, a new main post office was constructed at 395 Avenue de la Station and the 62nd (Shawinigan) Field Artillery Regiment moved into a new armory, located at 1825 Boulevard Royal.

== Footnotes ==
Parliament of Canada
Preceded by René Hamel (Bloc Populaire)	MP for Saint-Maurice—Laflèche; 1949–1962	Succeeded by Gérard Lamy (Social Credit)
