= Saint-Maurice—Laflèche =

Former federal electoral district in Quebec, Canada

Quebec electoral district

Defunct federal electoral district
- Legislature: House of Commons
- District created: 1933
- District abolished: 1967
- First contested: 1935
- Last contested: 1965

Saint-Maurice—Laflèche (previously known as St-Maurice—Laflèche) was a federal electoral district in Quebec, Canada, that was represented in the House of Commons of Canada from 1935 to 1968.

It was created as "St-Maurice—Laflèche" riding in 1933 from parts of Champlain and Three Rivers and St. Maurice ridings. In 1947, the riding's English name was changed to "Saint-Maurice—Laflèche". The electoral district was abolished in 1966 when it was redistributed into Berthier, Champlain and Saint-Maurice ridings.

== Members of Parliament ==
This riding elected the following members of Parliament:

| Parliament | Years | Member | Party |
|---|---|---|---|
St-Maurice—Laflèche; Riding created from Champlain and Three Rivers and St. Maurice
| 18th | 1935–1940 | Joseph-Alphida Crête | Liberal |
| 19th | 1940–1945 | Joseph-Alphida Crête | Liberal |
| 20th | 1945–1949 | René Hamel | Bloc populaire |
Saint-Maurice—Laflèche
| 21st | 1949–1953 | Joseph-Adolphe Richard | Liberal |
| 22nd | 1953–1957 | Joseph-Adolphe Richard | Liberal |
| 23rd | 1957–1958 | Joseph-Adolphe Richard | Liberal |
| 24th | 1958–1962 | Joseph-Adolphe Richard | Liberal |
| 25th | 1962–1963 | Gérard Lamy | Social Credit |
| 26th | 1963–1965 | Jean Chrétien | Liberal |
| 27th | 1965–1968 | Jean Chrétien | Liberal |
Riding dissolved into Berthier, Champlain and Saint-Maurice

== Election results ==
=== St-Maurice—Laflèche, 1935–1949 ===
1935 Canadian federal election
| Party | Candidate | Votes |
|---|---|---|
| Liberal | Joseph-Alphida Crête | 5,505 |
| Independent Liberal | Polydore Beaulac | 4,237 |
| Independent Liberal | Louis-Joseph Dostaler | 3,715 |
| Conservative | Elzéar Dallaire | 3,332 |

1940 Canadian federal election
| Party | Candidate | Votes |
|---|---|---|
| Liberal | Joseph-Alphida Crête | 9,440 |
| Independent Liberal | Joseph-A. Frigon | 7,465 |
| National Government | Joseph-Albert Béland | 1,957 |
| Independent Liberal | Elzéar Dallaire | 457 |

1945 Canadian federal election
| Party | Candidate | Votes |
|---|---|---|
| Bloc populaire | René Hamel | 9,779 |
| Liberal | Joseph-Alphida Crête | 9,323 |
| Independent Liberal | Joseph-Arthur Bilodeau | 4,352 |
| Social Credit | Lucien Lambert | 681 |

=== Saint-Maurice—Laflèche, 1949–1968 ===
1949 Canadian federal election
| Party | Candidate | Votes |
|---|---|---|
| Liberal | Joseph-Adolphe Richard | 13,898 |
| Independent | René Hamel | 11,646 |
| Union des électeurs | Joseph-Gabriel Lacasse | 2,064 |
| Progressive Conservative | Samuel Labelle | 347 |

1953 Canadian federal election
| Party | Candidate | Votes |
|---|---|---|
| Liberal | Joseph-Adolphe Richard | 18,662 |
| Progressive Conservative | Stolland Naud | 10,337 |

1957 Canadian federal election
| Party | Candidate | Votes |
|---|---|---|
| Liberal | Joseph-Adolphe Richard | 18,714 |
| Progressive Conservative | Lucien Filion | 7,686 |
| Co-operative Commonwealth | Fernand-Denis Lavergne | 4,369 |
| Independent | Bruno Pellerin | 751 |

1958 Canadian federal election
| Party | Candidate | Votes |
|---|---|---|
| Liberal | Joseph-Adolphe Richard | 18,556 |
| Progressive Conservative | Lucien Filion | 14,405 |
| Co-operative Commonwealth | Armand Coté | 1,863 |

1962 Canadian federal election
| Party | Candidate | Votes |
|---|---|---|
| Social Credit | Gérard Lamy | 20,225 |
| Liberal | Joseph-Adolphe Richard | 10,912 |
| Progressive Conservative | Edouardine Pellerin | 4,931 |

1963 Canadian federal election
| Party | Candidate | Votes |
|---|---|---|
| Liberal | Jean Chrétien | 16,358 |
| Social Credit | Gérard Lamy | 14,414 |
| Progressive Conservative | Bruno Pellerin | 3,018 |
| New Democratic | Martial Laforest | 1,983 |

1965 Canadian federal election
| Party | Candidate | Votes |
|---|---|---|
| Liberal | Jean Chrétien | 14,395 |
| Ralliement créditiste | Alphonse Poulin | 7,429 |
| New Democratic | C. Liddle | 5,669 |
| Progressive Conservative | Louis Lizotte | 5,115 |

== See also ==
- List of Canadian electoral districts
- Mauricie
- Historical federal electoral districts of Canada
