= Gérard Lamy =

Canadian politician (1919–2016)

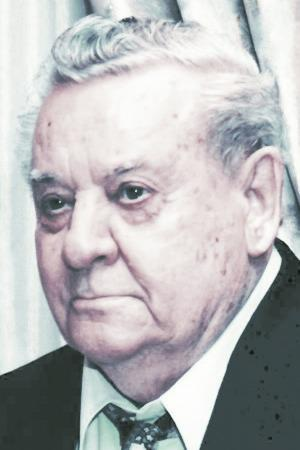
- Gérard Lamy

Member of the Canadian Parliament for Saint-Maurice—Laflèche
- In office 1962–1963
- Preceded by: Joseph-Adolphe Richard
- Succeeded by: Jean Chrétien

Personal details
- Born: May 2, 1919 Grand-Mère, Quebec, Canada
- Died: October 26, 2016 (aged 97) Trois-Rivières, Quebec, Canada
- Party: Social Credit Party of Canada; Ralliement créditiste du Québec; Progressive Conservative Party of Canada
- Spouse(s): Simone Bellemare (m. 25 Mar 1940 – 16 Jan 2009; her death)
- Profession: contractor

Gérard Lamy (May 2, 1919 – October 26, 2016) was a Canadian Social Credit Party politician. He served as a Member of the House of Commons of Canada from 1962 to 1963.

== Early life ==
He was born on May 2, 1919, in Grand-Mère, Quebec, and was a contractor before running for office.

== Member of Parliament ==
Lamy successfully ran as a Social Credit Party of Canada candidate for the district of Saint-Maurice—Laflèche in the 1962 federal election, against Liberal incumbent J.A. Richard.

He was among twenty-six Social Credit members from Quebec who were elected for the first time that year.

He lost his re-election bid in the 1963 federal election, against Liberal and future prime minister, Jean Chrétien.

== Attempts to make a political comeback ==
He also ran as a Ralliement créditiste du Québec candidate in the 1970 provincial election in the district of Saint-Maurice and as a Progressive Conservative candidate in the district of Champlain in the 1979 federal election, but was each time defeated.

Lamy did not run again after 1979.
