= René Hamel =

Canadian politician (1910–1982)

Joseph-Irénée-René Hamel (February 9, 1910 – December 16, 1982) was a local politician in Quebec, Canada. He served as Member of the Canadian Parliament and as Member of the Legislative Assembly of Quebec.

== Early life ==
He was born in 1910 in Grand-Mère, Quebec, Mauricie.

== World War II politics ==
During World War II Hamel joined the Bloc Populaire Canadien, a political party that opposed conscription. He was the party’s provincial candidate in the district of Saint-Maurice in 1944, but lost the election against Marc Trudel. The following year though, he successfully ran in the federal district of Saint-Maurice—Laflèche. After the war, the party quickly dissolved and by 1949 Hamel was sitting as an Independent MP. He lost re-election in that same year.

== Fighting Duplessis ==
Hamel, who opposed Premier Maurice Duplessis, made a political comeback in 1952. Benefiting from a strong support among Shawinigan’s labor class population, he was elected Liberal Member of the Legislative Assembly for the district of Saint-Maurice. Hamel became one of the most effective Liberal floor leaders.

In order to pressure voters into defeating Hamel, Duplessis refused to authorize the construction of a new bridge between Shawinigan and Shawinigan-Sud. Local Liberals jokingly claimed that they would rather swim than support Duplessis. Nonetheless, Hamel was narrowly re-elected against Shawinigan mayor Gaston Hardy in 1956.

Hamel was also a candidate for the 1958 Quebec Liberal Party leadership convention, but was defeated by Jean Lesage.

== Member of the Cabinet ==
In 1960 the Liberals won the provincial election and Lesage became Premier. Shawinigan got a new bridge. Hamel was appointed to the Cabinet. He was Minister of Municipal Affairs from 1960 to 1961, Minister of Labour from 1960 to 1963 and Attorney General from 1963 to 1964.

== After retirement from politics ==
In 1964, Hamel was appointed Judge and resigned his legislative and executive functions.

He died in Shawinigan in 1982.

== See also ==
- Mauricie
- Saint-Maurice Legislators
- Saint-Maurice—Champlain Federal Electoral District
- Saint-Maurice Provincial Electoral District
- Shawinigan, Quebec

== Footnotes ==
Parliament of Canada
| Preceded by J.-A. Crête (Liberal) | MP, District of Saint-Maurice—Laflèche; 1945–1949 | Succeeded by J.-A. Richard (Liberal) |
National Assembly of Quebec
| Preceded by Marc Trudel (UN) | MLA, District of Saint-Maurice; 1952–1964 | Succeeded by Jean-Guy Trépanier (Liberal) |
