= Jean Chrétien =

Prime Minister of Canada from 1993 to 2003

The Right Honourable Jean Chrétien PC OM CC KC AdE
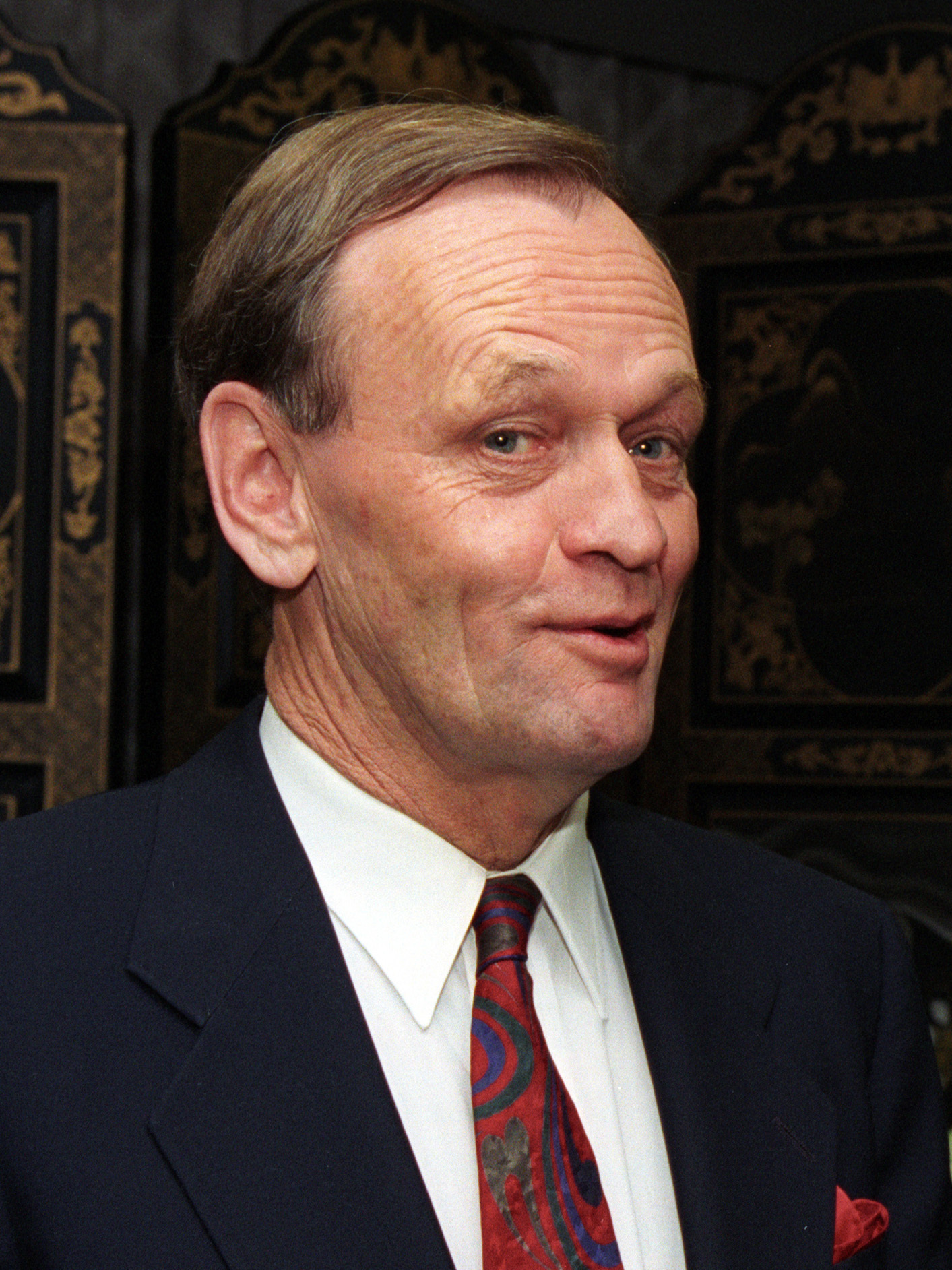
- Chrétien in 1993

20th Prime Minister of Canada
- In office November 4, 1993 – December 12, 2003
- Monarch: Elizabeth II
- Governors General: Ray Hnatyshyn; Roméo LeBlanc; Adrienne Clarkson
- Deputy: Sheila Copps; Herb Gray; John Manley
- Preceded by: Kim Campbell
- Succeeded by: Paul Martin

Leader of the Opposition
- In office December 10, 1990 – November 4, 1993
- Monarch: Elizabeth II
- Prime Minister: Brian Mulroney; Kim Campbell
- Preceded by: Herb Gray
- Succeeded by: Lucien Bouchard

Leader of the Liberal Party
- In office June 23, 1990 – November 14, 2003
- Deputy: Sheila Coops (1991–1993)
- Preceded by: John Turner
- Succeeded by: Paul Martin

Parliamentary Leader of the Liberal Party
- In office June 30, 1984 – September 17, 1984
- Leader: John Turner
- Preceded by: Pierre Trudeau (as Leader)
- Succeeded by: John Turner (as Leader)
Ministerial offices
2nd Deputy Prime Minister of Canada
In office June 30, 1984 – September 17, 1984
| Prime Minister | John Turner |
| Preceded by | Allan MacEachen |
| Succeeded by | Erik Nielsen |
Secretary of State for External Affairs
In office June 30, 1984 – September 17, 1984
| Prime Minister | John Turner |
| Preceded by | Allan MacEachen |
| Succeeded by | Joe Clark |
Minister of Energy, Mines and Resources
In office September 10, 1982 – June 30, 1984
| Prime Minister | Pierre Trudeau |
| Preceded by | Marc Lalonde |
| Succeeded by | Gerald Regan |
Minister of Justice Attorney General of Canada
In office March 3, 1980 – September 16, 1982
| Prime Minister | Pierre Trudeau |
| Preceded by | Jacques Flynn |
| Succeeded by | Mark MacGuigan |
Minister of Finance
In office September 16, 1977 – June 3, 1979
| Prime Minister | Pierre Trudeau |
| Preceded by | Donald Stovel Macdonald |
| Succeeded by | John Crosbie |
Minister of Industry, Trade and Commerce
In office September 14, 1976 – September 15, 1977
| Prime Minister | Pierre Trudeau |
| Preceded by | Don Jamieson |
| Succeeded by | Jack Horner |
President of the Treasury Board
In office August 8, 1974 – September 13, 1976
| Prime Minister | Pierre Trudeau |
| Preceded by | Charles Drury |
| Succeeded by | Bob Andras |
Minister of Indian Affairs and Northern Development
In office July 6, 1968 – August 7, 1974
| Prime Minister | Pierre Trudeau |
| Preceded by | Arthur Laing |
| Succeeded by | Judd Buchanan |
Minister of National Revenue
In office January 18, 1968 – July 5, 1968
| Prime Minister | Lester B. Pearson; Pierre Trudeau |
| Preceded by | Edgar Benson |
| Succeeded by | Jean-Pierre Côté |
Minister without portfolio
In office April 4, 1967 – January 17, 1968
| Prime Minister | Lester B. Pearson |
Member of Parliament constituencies
In office December 10, 1990 – December 12, 2003
| Preceded by | Fernand Robichaud |
| Succeeded by | Riding abolished |
| Constituency | Beauséjour (1990–1993); Saint-Maurice (1993–2003) |
In office April 8, 1963 – February 27, 1986
| Preceded by | Riding established |
| Succeeded by | Gilles Grondin |
- Constituency: Saint-Maurice—Laflèche (1963–1968); Saint-Maurice (1968–1986)

Personal details
- Born: Joseph Jacques Jean Chrétien; January 11, 1934 (age 92) Shawinigan Falls, Quebec, Canada
- Party: Liberal
- Spouse: Aline Chaîné (m. 1957; died 2020)
- Children: 3, including France
- Relatives: Michel Chrétien (brother); Raymond Chrétien (nephew)
- Education: Université Laval
- Occupation: Lawyer; politician
- Jean Chrétien's voice Chrétien on Canada-US relations and bilateral trade Recorded April 8, 1997

Joseph Jacques Jean Chrétien (Note: Canadian French: [ʒɑ̃ kʁetsjẽɪ̯̃]) (born January 11, 1934) is a Canadian lawyer and former politician who served as the 20th prime minister of Canada from 1993 to 2003. He served as leader of the Liberal Party from 1990 to 2003 and as leader of the Official Opposition from 1990 to 1993.

Born and raised in Shawinigan Falls, Quebec, Chrétien studied law at Université Laval. A Liberal, he was first elected to the House of Commons in the 1963 federal election. Chrétien served in various cabinet posts in the governments of Lester B. Pearson and Pierre Trudeau, most notably as the minister of Indian affairs and northern development, president of the Treasury Board, minister of finance, and minister of justice. In the last role, Chrétien played a key role in the patriation of the Constitution of Canada and the establishment of the Canadian Charter of Rights and Freedoms. Chrétien ran for the leadership of the Liberal Party in 1984, placing second to John Turner. He then served as deputy prime minister in Turner's short-lived government, which was defeated in the 1984 federal election. Chrétien briefly left politics in 1986 amid tensions with Turner and began working in the private sector. After the Liberals were defeated again in 1988, he returned to politics and won the leadership of the party in 1990 and became leader of the Official Opposition. Chrétien led the Liberal Party to a majority government in the 1993 federal election. He led the Liberals to two additional majorities in 1997 and 2000.

Chrétien became prime minister as Canada was on the brink of a debt crisis due to the country's unsustainable budget deficit. Adhering to a centrist Third Way approach, his government produced a series of austerity budgets which sharply reduced spending and reformed various programs, resulting in a budget surplus in 1997—Canada's first in nearly three decades. The latter half of Chrétien's tenure recorded consecutive budget surpluses which were primarily used to fund tax cuts and pay down government debt. In national unity issues, Chrétien strongly opposed the Quebec sovereignty movement and led the federalist campaign to a narrow victory in the 1995 Quebec referendum. He then launched a federal sponsorship program to promote Canada in Quebec and pioneered the Clarity Act, which established the conditions for future referendums on secession. Chrétien also enacted environmental legislation, including an updated Environmental Protection Act and the Species at Risk Act. He created the long-gun registry, privatized the Canadian National Railway, and introduced the harmonized sales tax (HST). After his election victory in 2000, he oversaw Operation Yellow Ribbon in response to the 9/11 terrorist attacks, enacted the Youth Criminal Justice Act, and laid the groundwork for the legalization of same-sex marriage. In foreign policy, Chrétien's government signed the Kyoto Protocol on climate change and spearheaded the Ottawa Treaty, which aimed to ban anti-personnel landmines worldwide. He authorized military intervention during the NATO bombing of Yugoslavia and the War in Afghanistan, and opposed participation in the Iraq War.

Although his popularity and that of the Liberal Party were seemingly unchallenged for three consecutive federal elections, Chrétien became subject to several controversies. He was accused of corruption in the Shawinigate and sponsorship scandals, although he has consistently denied any wrongdoing. He also became embroiled in a prolonged leadership struggle within the Liberal Party against his finance minister and long-time political rival, Paul Martin. In December 2003, amid pressure from the pro-Martin faction of the party and the threat of losing a leadership review, Chrétien resigned as prime minister and retired from politics. He is Canada's fifth longest-serving prime minister, and ranks highly in rankings of Canadian prime ministers. At age 92, Chrétien is the oldest living former Canadian prime minister.

== Early life, family, and education ==
Chrétien was born on January 11, 1934, in Shawinigan Falls, Quebec, as the 18th of 19 children (10 of whom did not survive infancy) born to Marie (née Boisvert, 1892–1954) and Wellie Chrétien (1887–1980). His younger brother is the neuroendocrinology researcher Michel Chrétien. The working-class Chrétien family was poor, and Chrétien had to wear hand-me-down clothes. Chrétien's parents wanted their children to escape a working-class life in Shawinigan by attending a classical college. Chrétien's father made him read the dictionary as a young boy. Chrétien's older brother Maurice won a scholarship from the insurance company he worked for, which allowed him to attend medical school, and, with the profits from his medical practice, was able to help his younger siblings attend the classical colleges. Wellie Chrétien was a staunch Liberal who once shook hands with his hero as a young man, Sir Wilfrid Laurier. The local parish priest, Father Auger, a supporter of the Union Nationale who regarded all Liberals as "ungodly", spread malicious rumours about the Liberal Chrétien family, saying he would never let a teenage girl go on a date unchaperoned with any of the Chrétien boys, which caused the young Jean Chrétien to have troubled relations with the Catholic church.

During World War II, the Canadian nationalist Wellie Chrétien had attracted much public disapproval by being a staunch supporter of the war effort, especially by being one of the few French-Canadians in Shawinigan willing to publicly support sending the conscripts (known as "Zombies") to fight overseas. Under the 1940 National Resources Mobilization Act, the federal government could conscript Canadians only for the defence of Canada, and until late 1944, only volunteers went to fight overseas. In 1940s Quebec, where many French Canadians were opposed to Canada fighting in the war, particularly to sending the "Zombies" overseas, this made Wellie Chrétien and his family outcasts. Furthermore, during the Grande Noirceur ("Great Darkness") when Quebec society was dominated by the Union Nationale patronage system, the Chrétien family were excluded because of Wellie Chrétien's support for the war. The Union Nationale Premier Maurice Duplessis had been an outspoken opponent of Canadian participation in World War II. Until 1964, Quebec had no public schools, and Chrétien was educated in Catholic schools. Chrétien disliked the Catholic priests who educated him and was disliked by them in turn, with one of Chrétien's former teachers, Father François Lanoue, recalling that Chrétien was the only student he ever grabbed by his ears, as he was too unruly. In an interview, Chrétien called his education "unnatural", as he recalled an extremely strict regime where the priests beat anyone bloody who dared to question their authority while teaching via rote learning. One of Chrétien's classmates recalled, "We didn't have the right to have feelings or express them".

Chrétien got his early schooling at a private boys' school in Joliette. He then attended Séminaire Saint-Joseph de Trois-Rivières. He obtained excellent grades and then studied law at Université Laval, the training ground of the French-Canadian elite. Despite the tough image that he cultivated at Séminaire Saint-Joseph, Chrétien's grades were high, with an education that focused mostly on Catholic theology, the classics, philosophy, and French. When Chrétien graduated from Séminaire Saint-Joseph, Duplessis came to address the class and, upon meeting Chrétien, asked him if his grandfather was François Chrétien, who once served as mayor of Saint-Étienne-des-Grès, and if his father was Wellie Chrétien. Upon receiving affirmative answers to both questions, the premier said with disgust, "Then you're a damn rouge".

Later at Laval, Chrétien protested the fact that the law faculty gave the Revised Statutes of Quebec free to Union Nationale students while Liberal students had to pay $10 for it, which led him and another well-connected student to meet Duplessis in his office. Duplessis told Chrétien the Union Nationale only rewarded those who had "faith", and if he wanted the book for free, then he should have had "faith", noting that there were no "rights" in Quebec as he was "Le Chef" ("the boss"). At Laval, Chrétien became active in the Young Liberals, becoming president because no one else wanted the job, as most students were too frightened to antagonize the Union Nationale. In 1958, he attended the Liberal convention in Ottawa that chose Lester Pearson as the party's leader, and where Chrétien supported Paul Martin Sr.

Chrétien later drew attention to his humble origins, calling himself "le petit gars de Shawinigan", or the "little guy from Shawinigan". In his youth, he suffered from an attack of Bell's palsy, permanently leaving the left side of his face partially paralyzed. Chrétien used this in his first Liberal leadership campaign, saying that he was "One politician who didn't talk out of both sides of his mouth." He is also deaf in his right ear.

On September 10, 1957, he married Aline Chaîné, whom he had met when he was 18 and she was 16. They had three children: France (b. 1958), Hubert (b. 1965) and Michel (b. 1968), who was adopted in 1970. France Chrétien Desmarais, who is a lawyer, is married to André Desmarais, the son of Paul Desmarais, Sr., and the president and co-chief executive officer of his father's company, Power Corporation, based in Montreal, Canada. Reflecting Chrétien's poor relations with the Catholic church, the local priest in Shawinigan, Father Auger, refused to marry Chrétien in his church, saying only bleus (blues, i.e., Union Nationale supporters) were welcome in his church and rouges (reds, i.e., Liberals) were not.

== Early political career ==
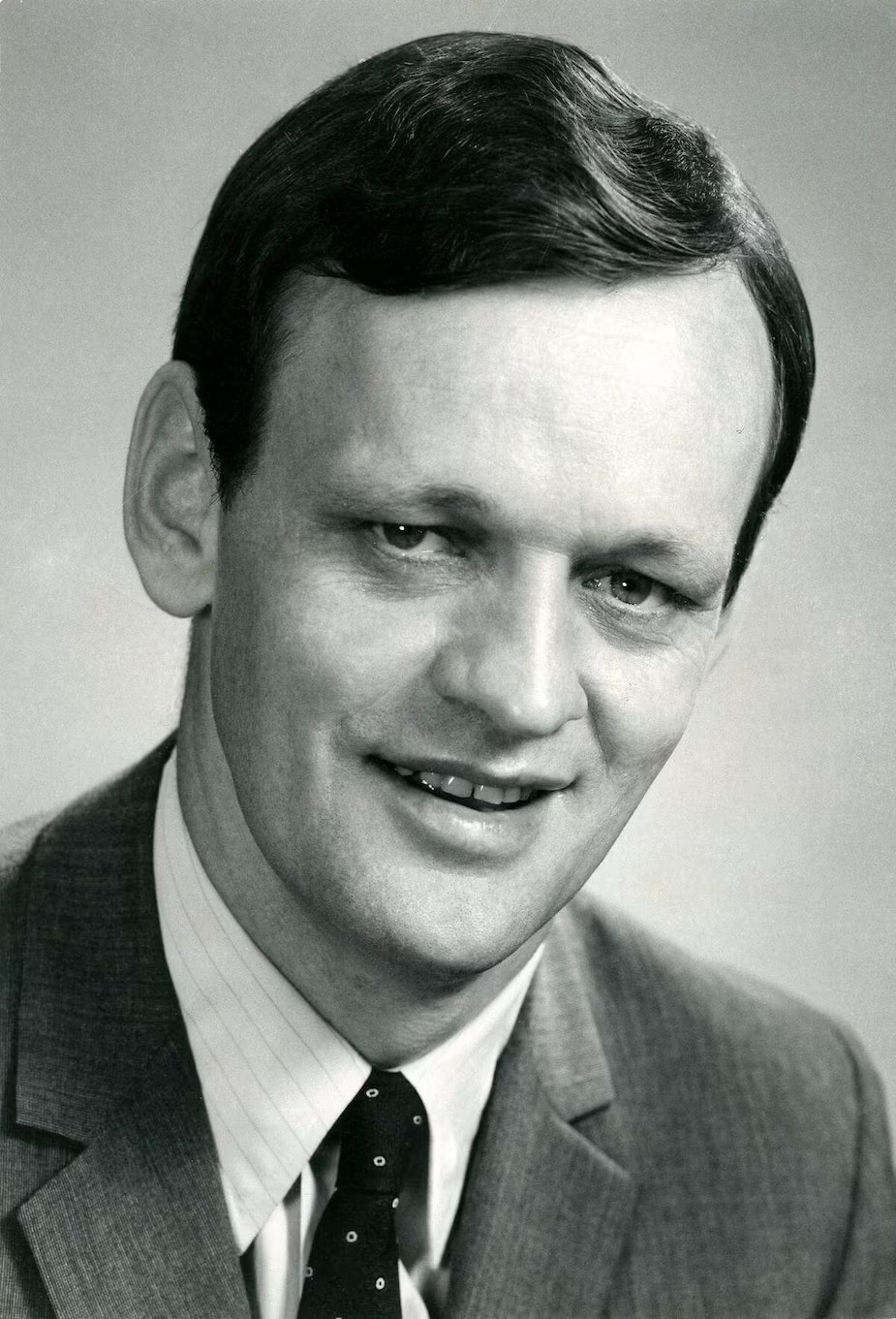
Jean Chrétien as minister of Indian affairs and northern development in 1968

Chrétien practised law at the Shawinigan firm of Alexandre Gélinas and Joe Lafond until he was first elected to the House of Commons of Canada as a Liberal from the riding of Saint-Maurice–Laflèche in the 1963 election. He represented this Shawinigan-based constituency, renamed Saint-Maurice in 1968, for all but eight of the next 41 years. The Social Credit Party had won the district in the 1962 election, and Chrétien won the Liberal nomination for the 1963 election as the previous Liberal Member of Parliament (MP) decided to retire. Chrétien won the election after portraying the incumbent Social Credit MP, Gérard Lamy, as a "buffoon" who made French-Canadians look stupid. Early in Chrétien's career, Dalton Camp described him as looking like "the driver of the getaway car", a condescending assessment which stuck with him and which journalists and others often cited throughout his career, usually considering his eventual success. The only committee assignment he requested, and obtained, during his first term was to the Finance Committee.

Shortly before the 1965 election, Chrétien very briefly served as parliamentary secretary to Prime Minister Lester B. Pearson. When Pearson recruited his "Three Wise Men" (Jean Marchand, Gérard Pelletier, and Pierre Trudeau) into the cabinet, Chrétien was disappointed at being bypassed, telling Pearson that he deserved to be promoted to the cabinet. Starting in 1966, he served for a more substantial period of time as parliamentary secretary to Minister of Finance Mitchell Sharp. Sharp was to serve as Chrétien's mentor and patron, helping him rise through the ranks.

In 1967, Chrétien visited western Canada for the first time, having been curious to see it. In Vancouver, he declared in a speech about the demands for more powers for Quebec being made by Union Nationale Premier Daniel Johnson that "those who are in favour of a special status [for Quebec] are often separatists who don't want to admit they are separatists", which caused an uproar in Quebec, with Johnson saying he just wanted more powers for Quebec, not independence. When, in a speech during a visit to Montreal for Expo 67, French president Charles de Gaulle said "Vive le Québec libre!" ("Long Live A Free Quebec!") and compared the Quiet Revolution to the liberation of France from the Nazis, Chrétien demanded during a cabinet meeting that the government order de Gaulle to leave Canada.

=== Joins cabinet ===
Chrétien was appointed minister without portfolio in April 1967 and then minister of national revenue in January 1968, making him a junior minister in the cabinet. During the 1968 Liberal leadership race, Chrétien fought hard on behalf of his mentor Sharp, who aspired to lead the Liberal Party. When Sharp withdrew from the race, Chrétien followed Sharp in swinging his support behind the man who eventually won the race, Pierre Trudeau.

Chrétien, second from right, as a minister in Lester Pearson's Cabinet in 1967. From left to right, Pierre Trudeau, John Turner, Chrétien, and Pearson. All four men served as prime ministers of Canada.

After the June 1968 election that gave the Liberals a majority government, Trudeau appointed Chrétien minister of Indian affairs and northern development. Trudeau and Chrétien were never close, as the gulf between the Trudeau and Chrétien was too wide, but Trudeau did value Chrétien as an extremely loyal and competent minister, and as a "tough guy" trouble-shooter who could handle difficult assignments. Trudeau and his intellectual advisors in the Prime Minister's Office (PMO) held Chrétien in contempt as someone who spoke French with a working-class accent and whose manners were unpolished, but they appreciated his toughness and ability to get things done.

While at Indian Affairs, Chrétien introduced the 1969 White Paper, a proposal to abolish treaties between Canada and First Nations and related legislation, including the Indian Act. Critics charged that the goal was to assimilate First Nations people into the general Canadian population. First Nations groups widely opposed the White Paper, and it was later abandoned. It was the 1969 White Paper that first brought Chrétien to widespread public attention in English Canada. At a press conference announcing the White Paper, Chrétien clashed with Indigenous activists, with one First Nations woman asking Chrétien, "When did we lose our identity?", to which he replied: "When you signed the treaties", which prompted boos and jeers. Another woman from the Iroquois reserve at Brantford asked Chrétien, "How can you come here and ask us to become citizens, when we were here long before you?", noting the Crown had granted the Grand River valley to Joseph Brant in 1784, to which Chrétien had no reply. Cree activist Harold Cardinal attacked Chrétien and Trudeau for the White Paper in his bestselling 1969 book The Unjust Society, accusing them of "cultural genocide" against the First Nations. To counteract such criticism, Chrétien adopted an Inuk boy from a local orphanage during a 1970 visit to the Northwest Territories. As Indian Affairs minister, Chrétien fell in love with the far north of Canada, whose beauty moved him, and he vacationed in the north every summer while holding the Indian Affairs portfolio.

During the October Crisis of 1970, Chrétien told Trudeau to "act now, explain later" when Trudeau was hesitant to invoke the War Measures Act. Eighty-five per cent of Canadians agreed with the move. In the 1972 election, Chrétien, who was frightened by a near-defeat in 1968, had a friend, Antonio Genest, win the Progressive Conservative (PC) nomination and then run a deliberately inept campaign in order to ensure his re-election. Robert Bourassa, the Liberal premier of Quebec, was a nationalist who frequently pressed for more devolution of federal powers to his province, making him Trudeau's bête noire, with the two men openly feuding. In 1971, when the Bourassa government began the James Bay Project to develop hydroelectric dams on rivers flowing into James Bay, which was opposed by the local Cree bands who claimed the land slated for development, Chrétien intervened on the side of the Cree. In a speech, Chrétien said Bourassa "could go to hell", stated he did not have the right to build on or flood the land claimed by the Cree, and hired lawyers to argue for the Cree in the courts. In November 1973, a judge ruled for the Cree, but a few days later the appeals court ruled for Quebec.

In 1974, Chrétien was appointed President of the Treasury Board, and beginning in 1976, he served as Minister of Industry, Trade and Commerce. At the Treasury Board, Chrétien became known as "Doctor No", as he brusquely refused requests from other ministers for more money for their departments. The 1970s were a time of rapid inflation, and Chrétien often clashed with public sector unions that demanded wage increases. At a time when deficits were rising and the Trudeau government was widely seen as drifting, Chrétien's "tough guy" image won him widespread attention, with many in the media portraying him as one of the few people in the Trudeau cabinet willing to make tough decisions. As industry minister, Chrétien was in charge of the Trudeau government's efforts to "diversify" the economy by trading more with Asia and Europe and less with the United States. Chrétien often complained that the high Canadian dollar hindered his efforts to "diversify" trade, and he became known for his belief in the value of a low dollar. As industry minister, Chrétien moved to the left, being known for his populist policies, imposing tariffs on clothing made abroad to encourage more production in Canada, and having the government fund the development of the Challenger aircraft.

=== Minister of finance ===
In 1977, following the resignation of Finance Minister Donald MacDonald, Chrétien succeeded him. He was the first francophone minister of finance, and remains one of only three francophones to have held that post. Chrétien's time at Finance highlighted his "enforcer" status, namely as someone who often helped to execute Trudeau's policies, but who rarely helped Trudeau to make policy. During his time at Finance, Trudeau completely excluded Chrétien from any role in making financial policy and instead expected Chrétien to simply carry out the policies that he and his advisors at the PMO had decided beforehand without consulting Chrétien at all.

Trudeau was extremely close to the West German chancellor Helmut Schmidt, and during the 1978 G7 summit in Bonn, Trudeau had extensive discussions with his friend Schmidt about how best to win re-election in 1979. Schmidt suggested to Trudeau that he respond to criticism of the deficits he had been running by bringing in some big cuts to spending, an idea that Trudeau took up. In 1978, Trudeau announced in a press statement $2 billion in cuts without bothering to inform Chrétien beforehand about what he had decided to do, leaving his finance minister looking clueless in the resulting press interview. Chrétien found this experience so humiliating that he seriously considered resigning in protest. Chrétien was especially humiliated by the fact that Chancellor Schmidt was better informed about what was going to happen than he was, which underlined that he was not a member of Trudeau's inner circle.

Chrétien presented two federal budgets to the House of Commons in 1978, one in April and the other in November.

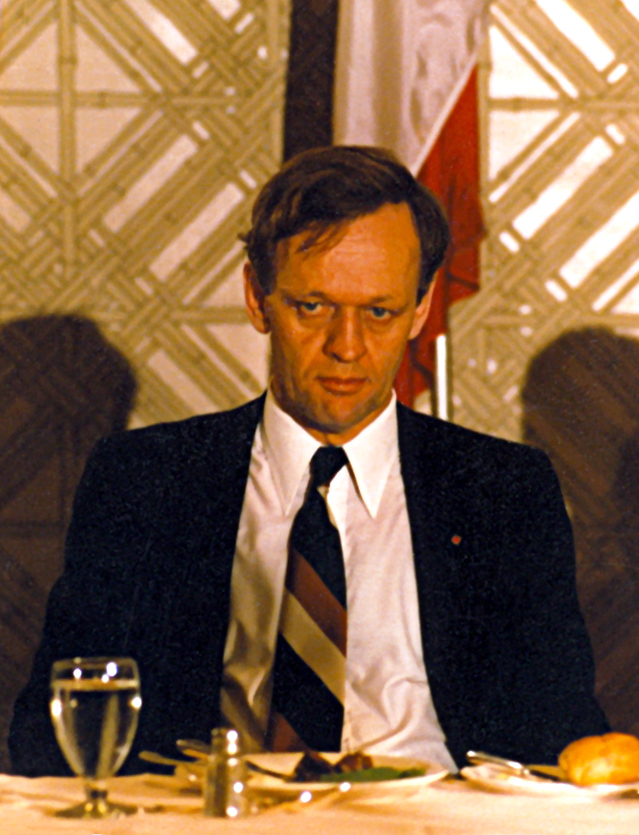
Chrétien in 1980

=== Major role in referendum campaign ===
The Liberals lost the federal election of May 1979 to a minority Progressive Conservative government led by Joe Clark. However, the PC government fell when the House of Commons failed to approve its budget in December, triggering the 1980 Canadian federal election in February. Trudeau had originally resigned the Liberal leadership after his 1979 election loss, but no leadership election had taken place to choose his successor before the fall of the Clark government; this allowed him to rescind his resignation and lead the Liberals to victory with a majority government.

Trudeau appointed Chrétien as Minister of Justice and Attorney General. In this role, Chrétien was a major force in the 1980 Quebec referendum, being one of the main federal representatives "on the ground" during the campaign. His fiery and emotional speeches drew federalist crowds with his blunt warnings of the consequences of separation. During the referendum, Chrétien fiercely fought behind the scenes with the leader of the Quebec Liberals, Claude Ryan, who served as the chairman of the non committee, about the best course to follow, with Ryan favouring a more Quebec nationalist message as opposed to Chrétien's unabashed Canadian nationalist message. Chrétien delivered an average of five or six speeches a day during the 1980 referendum all across Quebec and always managed to work in a local reference in every speech.

=== Patriation of the Constitution ===
Chrétien also served as minister of state for social development and minister responsible for constitutional negotiations, playing a significant role in the debates leading to the patriation of the Constitution of Canada in 1982. On September 28, 1981, the Supreme Court ruled that the federal government could patriate the British North America Acts without the consent of the provinces, but also ruled this would be "odious". Chrétien informed the premiers opposing patriation that Ottawa would unilaterally patriate the Constitution, but was willing to talk at a final conference. During the resulting First Ministers conference in November 1981, two of the premiers, Allan Blakeney of Saskatchewan and Sterling Lyon of Manitoba, made it clear that their principal objection to the proposed Canadian Charter of Rights and Freedoms was that it undermined the ancient British tradition of parliamentary supremacy. Ever since the Glorious Revolution of 1688, the principle had always been that Parliament was the supreme lawmaking body in the land, and both Blakeney and Lyon were concerned that the Charter would give too much power to the courts.

Chrétien was the chief negotiator of what would be called the "Kitchen Accord", a compromise that led nine provinces to agree to patriation. In the Kitchen Accord, Chrétien, along with attorneys general Roy McMurtry of Ontario and Roy Romanow of Saskatchewan, devised the compromise of Section 33, the so-called "notwithstanding clause", allowing Parliament and provincial legislatures to overrule the courts in Charter cases. Chrétien remembered that Trudeau "hated" the idea of Section 33 and that he had to tell him: "Pierre, if you don't take the notwithstanding clause, you don't have the Charter." Trudeau only accepted Section 33 when Ontario Premier Bill Davis, one of only two premiers supporting the federal government (the other being Richard Hatfield of New Brunswick), phoned him to say he would not support Trudeau in London if Trudeau did not accept Section 33, which Chrétien remembered changed Trudeau's attitude completely. In a 2012 interview, Chrétien defended the controversial Section 33, saying: "Because some would argue that in a society the elected people have to be supreme — not judges — and I subscribe to that. Look at what happened in the United States where the judges reign according to their so-called philosophy. That is not the tradition here." All of the English-speaking premiers accepted the compromise of Section 33, but Quebec Premier René Lévesque did not. Chrétien's role in the dealings would not be forgotten in his native province of Quebec (although the Supreme Court of Canada ruled that Quebec was bound by it). One of Trudeau's aides, Barry Strayer, later said about Chrétien's role in the constitutional battle: "He was able to contemplate compromises that Trudeau would not have been able to. Everybody saw him as a honest broker. Without him you could argue it would not have happened."

=== Minister of Energy, Mines and Resources ===
In 1982, Chrétien was appointed Minister of Energy, Mines and Resources, putting him in charge of enforcing the National Energy Program (NEP), which helped to make him a highly unpopular figure in Alberta. Chrétien himself was doubtful about the value of the NEP, saying at the time of his appointment as energy minister, "We've got to back off on the NEP without destroying our credibility," but upon learning that Trudeau and his right-hand man, Finance Minister Marc Lalonde, were in favour of continuing the NEP, Chrétien decided to fall in line rather than risk his chances of one day winning the Liberal leadership. Chrétien's battles with Alberta Premier Peter Lougheed over the NEP helped to confirm his disdain for provincial politicians, whom he saw as petty people only interested in their own provinces at the expense of the nation.

=== 1984: First leadership bid and relationship with Turner ===
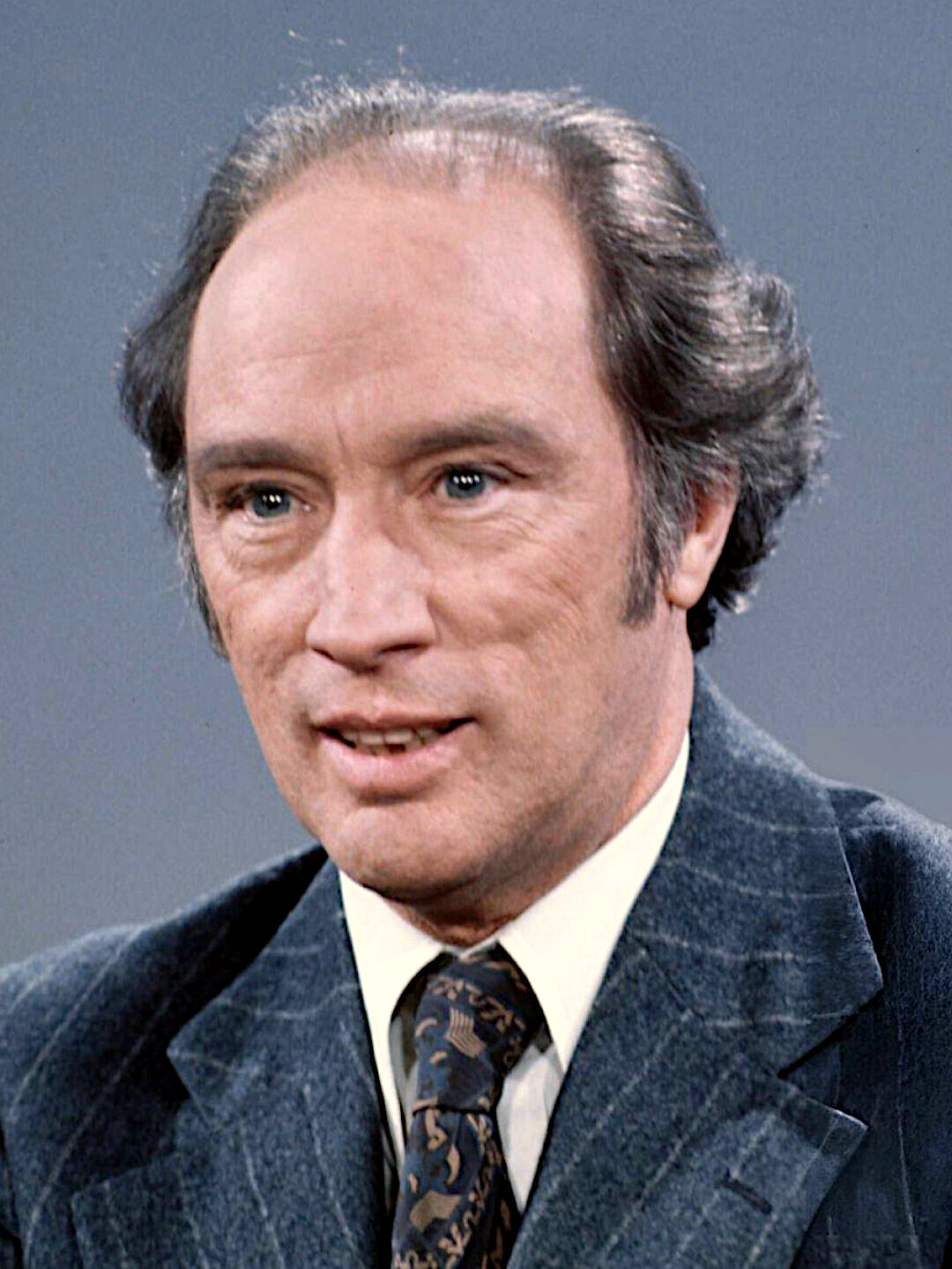
When Prime Minister Pierre Trudeau announced his retirement in 1984, Chrétien ran for the leadership of the Liberal Party by portraying himself as the candidate who would best continue Trudeau's policies and defend his legacy.

After Trudeau announced his retirement as Prime Minister and Liberal Party leader in early 1984, Chrétien was one of the candidates seeking to replace him as leader. The experience was a hard one for Chrétien, as many of his longtime Cabinet allies supported the bid of John Turner, who was viewed as more electable, much to Chrétien's intense disappointment. During the leadership race in the spring of 1984, Chrétien ran as the defender of the Trudeau era and promised to continue all of Trudeau's policies, unlike Turner, who promised a break with Trudeau. During the leadership race, Chrétien presented himself as a folksy leftish populist and mocked Turner as a right-wing Bay Street snob who was out of touch with ordinary people. Chrétien opposed Turner's claim that the national deficit was not a problem, arguing in a speech, "We have to use the deficit to keep the dignity of our people." Chrétien attracted larger and more enthusiastic crowds than anything Turner ever managed, but most of the Liberal Party establishment had rallied to Turner when he announced his candidacy in March 1984, which proved to be an insurmountable handicap for Chrétien. Chrétien was thought to be a dark horse until the end, but lost on the second ballot to Turner at the leadership convention that June. Liberal Party president Iona Campagnolo introduced Chrétien as "Second on the ballot, but first in our hearts." Turner appointed Chrétien Deputy Prime Minister and Secretary of State for External Affairs.

After winning the leadership race, Turner wanted to reconcile with Chrétien and lead a united party into the coming general election, so he asked Chrétien what terms he would accept. Chrétien, angry about losing the leadership race, asked for terms he knew Turner could never give him, demanding to be appointed Quebec lieutenant, with control of patronage and organization in Quebec. However, Turner had already promised the position to André Ouellet in exchange for support in the leadership race. As a result, Turner compromised by creating a troika of Chrétien, Ouellet, and Lalonde to run Liberal operations in Quebec. The troika was a sham, and during the 1984 election, its three members spent more time feuding with one another than in combating the Progressive Conservatives.

Chrétien's demand for the Quebec lieutenancy was not his only issue with Turner, as he almost immediately clashed with the prime minister over the calling of an early election. As the last general election had been held in February 1980, the next general election could be held no later than February 1985. Chrétien advised Turner not to ask the governor general to dissolve Parliament, but instead to keep it in session during the fall of 1984 to give the government a record to run on in a winter election in early 1985. Turner disregarded Chrétien's advice, believing that a boost in the polls after he assumed the premiership in late June 1984 justified asking for Parliament to be dissolved and holding an election in September 1984.

== 1984–1993: In opposition ==
Relations between Chrétien and Turner were strained, especially after the Liberals' severe defeat in the 1984 election by the Progressive Conservatives, now led by Brian Mulroney. Chrétien was one of only 17 Liberal MPs elected from Quebec (the party had won 74 out of 75 seats there in 1980), and one of only four elected from a riding outside Montreal.

Chrétien was a focus of dissatisfaction with Turner, with many polls showing his popularity. His 1985 book, Straight from the Heart, was an instant bestseller in which he recounted his early life in Shawinigan, his years spent in the House of Commons of Canada as both a member of Parliament and a cabinet minister, and his failed 1984 leadership bid.

=== 1986: Temporarily leaves politics ===
Chrétien, whose relations with Turner were very poor, resigned his seat and left public life for a time. On February 27, 1986, Chrétien, accompanied by his special executive assistant Jean Carle, went to Turner's office to hand in his resignation. Turner forced Chrétien to wait a considerable period of time during which Carle broke down in tears. Chrétien was visibly angry when Turner finally received them, making for a tense and barely civil meeting. Chrétien's resignation was largely motivated by his desire to better organize against Turner in the leadership review, which was due in the fall of 1986. Now working in the private sector again, Chrétien sat on the boards of several corporations, including the Power Corporation of Canada subsidiary Consolidated Bathurst, the Toronto-Dominion Bank, and the Brick Warehouse Corporation. Chrétien professed to be retired from politics, but he told reporters within days of his retirement, "I will always be a politician. I love politics." Crucially, Chrétien did not disband the campaign organization that he founded in 1984, suggesting that his retirement had always been intended to be temporary.

In November 1986, when the Liberals held their leadership review, Chrétien attempted to organize against Turner, which led to a bruising battle between factions loyal to the two men. Chrétien used Turner's penchant for heavy drinking to spread rumors that Turner was an alcoholic who was simply too drunk most of the time to lead the Liberals to power effectively. He formally claimed to be neutral on the question of Turner's management of the Liberal Party, but lobbied as many Liberal MPs and senators as possible behind the scenes for their support in bringing down Turner. The intense emotions stirred up by the leadership review boiled over when Chrétien arrived to vote in the review, leading to a chaotic scene on the convention floor in which police had to be called to quell physical fighting between Chrétien partisans and Turner partisans. Turner won the leadership review, earning about 75% of the delegate vote.

In the 1988 election, the Liberals only experienced a moderate recovery, doubling the number of seats they won in 1984. However, Mulroney's Progressive Conservatives won a second consecutive majority government, campaigning in favour of a free trade agreement with the United States. Having lost a second straight general election, Turner announced his resignation as Liberal leader in 1989, triggering the June 1990 Liberal leadership election in Calgary.

=== 1990: Returns to politics and wins Liberal leadership ===
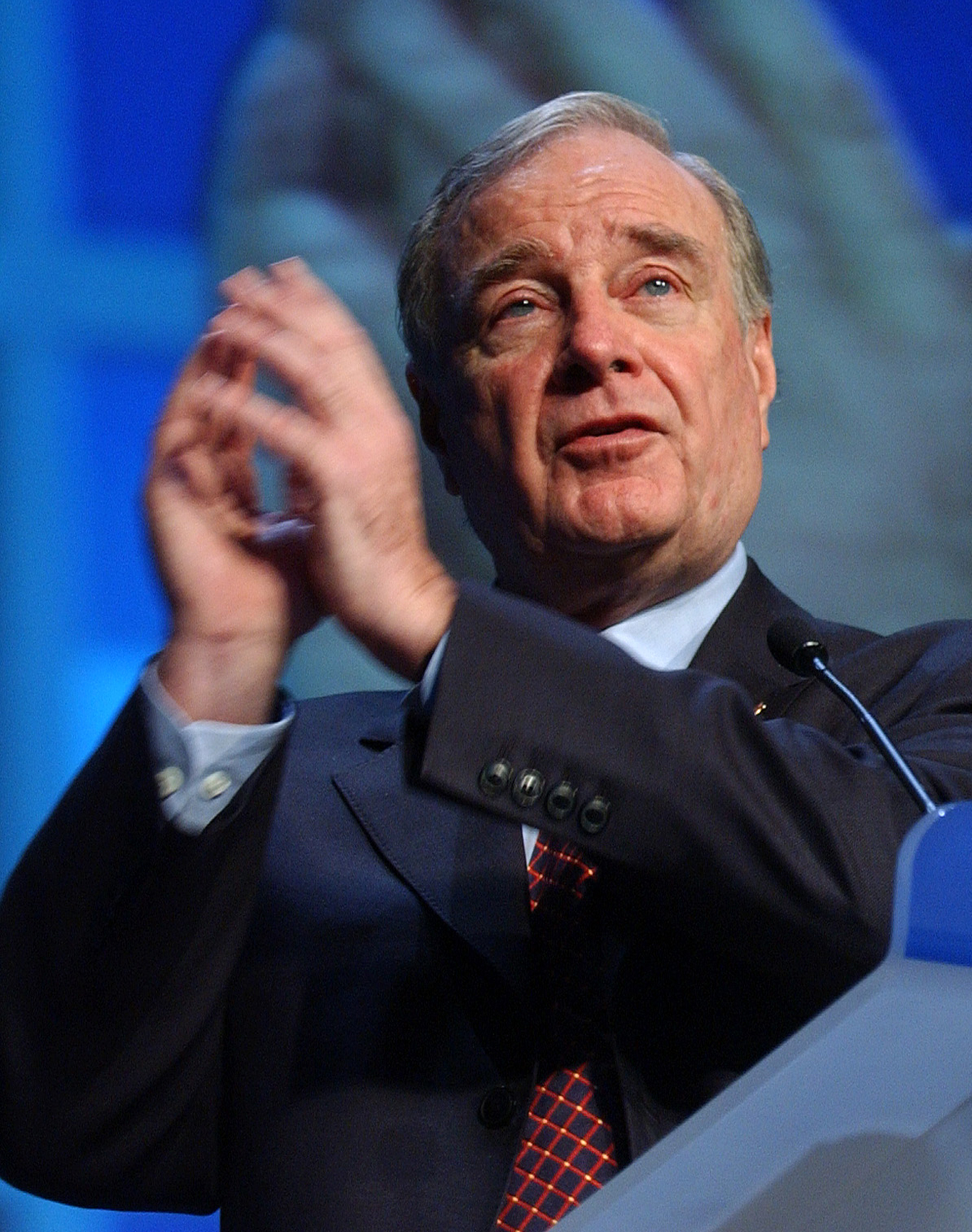
Paul Martin was Chrétien's main opponent for the leadership of the Liberal Party in 1990. The campaign between them started a political rivalry that would endure throughout and beyond Chrétien's premiership.

At a press conference in Ottawa on January 23, 1990, Chrétien declared that he would run for the Liberal Party leadership and proudly stated that the day would be remembered as the beginning of the "Chrétien era" in Canada. Chrétien's principal opponent in the contest, Paul Martin, was generally seen as the ideological heir to Turner, while Chrétien was seen to be the ideological heir to Trudeau. The fact that most of the Liberals who had supported Turner in the 1980s supported Martin in 1990 confirmed Chrétien's disdain for Martin, whom he saw as a Bay Street "big shot" like Turner.

The most controversial issue facing Canada during the first half of 1990 was the Meech Lake Accord, a set of proposed constitutional amendments that would have seen a significant devolution of federal powers to the provinces and included a clause that would have recognized Quebec as a "distinct society" within Canada. Chrétien had announced in a January 1990 speech that he opposed Meech Lake but stated that he would support the accord with amendments, such as scrapping the controversial "distinct society" clause as written; having the preamble to the constitution instead declare that Quebec was a "distinct society"; and adding a new clause saying if any conflict arose between the constitutional recognition of Quebec as a "distinct society" and the Charter of Rights and Freedoms, the latter would always prevail. The "distinct society" clause theoretically could have been the basis of a wide-ranging devolution of federal power, since the clause might have empowered the Quebec government to pass any law short of secession to protect the "distinct society". This made the clause very popular in Quebec, but aroused passionate opposition in English Canada. In a much-discussed essay, Trudeau had warned that giving Quebec the constitutional right to be a "distinct society" would mean that Quebec could quite legally begin to expel its anglophone minority. Chrétien's proposed amendments would have meant that the constitution would have recognized Quebec as a "distinct society" but effectively gutted any attempt to use that to grant any special powers to Quebec. In private, Chrétien opposed Meech Lake, but as the accord was extremely popular in Quebec, running as an out-and-out opponent of Meech Lake was judged to be too risky politically, causing him to conditionally oppose the accord in public. Meech Lake placed Chrétien in a difficult position because it was very popular in Quebec and loathed by the Trudeau wing of the Liberals; Chrétien needed the support of both entities in the leadership race. He tried to avoid talking about Meech Lake as much as possible, which was a minefield issue for him; he instead stuck to generalities about national unity. Martin, by contrast, had declared himself an unconditional supporter of Meech Lake as it was; he was also quite willing to talk about his support.

Chrétien's key campaign man was Jim Karygiannis, who specialized in signing up immigrants to serve as Chrétien delegates. He signed 9,500 immigrants as Chrétien delegates between January and June 1990. In large part because of Karygiannis and his team, Chrétien had by late April 1990 signed up 1,500 delegates, which made him the clear front-runner compared to Martin's 500 delegates.

A key moment in the leadership contest took place at an all-candidates debate in Montreal on June 2, 1990. The discussion quickly turned to the Meech Lake Accord, which had emerged as the major policy issue dividing Chrétien and Martin. Martin attempted to force Chrétien to abandon his nuanced position on Meech Lake and speak out either for or against it, saying that Chrétien's position of opposing Meech Lake as it was but being willing to support it with amendments, was trying to have it both ways. When Chrétien refused to endorse Meech Lake as it was, young Liberal delegates crowding the hall began to chant vendu ("sellout" in French), "you're selling out to the Anglos," and "Judas" at Chrétien. One of Chrétien's aides frantically asked that Martin "get the fuck out there and do something," as the Young Liberals continued shouting abuse at Chrétien to his clear discomfort, only to be told that the Quebec youth were "hotheads" whom nobody could control. Privately, Chrétien was deeply enraged by the incident, claimed that the delegates shouting vendu at him were actually Martin supporters from Toronto, and charged that their poor French had betrayed that they had not been from Quebec. Martin denied involvement in "coordinating" any response from the floor or a similar outburst by his supporters at the convention. Ultimately, Chrétien defeated Martin for the leadership on the first and only ballot, but his position on Meech Lake had irreversibly damaged his reputation in his home province.

=== Leader of the Official Opposition ===
As Chrétien's leadership victory occurred on June 23, 1990 – the same day that the Meech Lake Accord failed to gain ratification – he was heavily criticized in the Quebec media for his opposition to the accord. Photographs of Chrétien embracing Newfoundland premier Clyde Wells, a prominent opponent of Meech Lake, at the convention attracted much negative comment in Quebec. His leadership was also shaken by the defection of francophone MPs (and Martin loyalists) Jean Lapierre and Gilles Rocheleau from the caucus to the new Bloc Québécois (BQ); Lapierre and Rocheleau contended that they could not serve under the anti-Meech Lake Chrétien. In a by-election for Laurier—Sainte-Marie on August 13, 1990, the Bloc's Gilles Duceppe badly defeated Chrétien's hand-picked candidate Denis Coderre, costing the Liberals a constituency they had held since 1917; many attributed this to Chrétien's opposition to the Meech Lake Accord. Upon becoming Liberal leader, Chrétien appointed his friend Eddie Goldenberg as his chief of staff and formed a leadership team comprising John Rae and David Zussman as his policy advisors, his "surrogate son" Jean Carle as his special executive assistant, Warren Kinsella as his media adviser, and George Radwanski as his speech-writer. All members of this leadership team were later to play prominent roles in the Prime Minister's Office during Chrétien's time as prime minister.

In September 1990, Chrétien, seeing a chance to make a strong impression on public opinion after a shaky start as leader, gained a major windfall after Mulroney introduced an unpopular Goods and Services Tax (GST), which Chrétien decided to vigorously oppose. Traditionally in Canada, the government had levied a 13.5% Manufacturers' Sales Tax (MST) paid by manufacturers, who passed on the cost of the tax to consumers in the form of higher prices. Since foreign manufacturers did not pay the MST, however, this placed Canadian companies at a competitive disadvantage in their home market. To compensate, the government had levied tariffs on manufactured imports to maintain a level playing field. When the free trade agreement with the United States came into effect in 1989, the government could no longer levy tariffs on American imports, leading to furious complaints from Canadian industry about having to compete with American companies who did not pay the MST. To save Canadian industry and the jobs of those Canadians employed in manufacturing from being destroyed by American competition, the Mulroney government decided in late 1989 to abolish the MST and replace it with the GST, whose 7% costs would be borne by consumers. On the proposed GST, Chrétien was torn between his belief that the tax was economically necessary and his desire to score political points by opposing a proposed tax that most Canadians opposed; consequently, he was initially vague about where he stood on the GST. Only in September 1990, after months of vacillation, did Chrétien finally make up his mind to oppose the GST.

Chrétien's decision to oppose the GST in 1990 was taken for reasons of political expediency rather than principle, namely that he needed an issue to oppose the government on that would allow him to connect with the public; sources close to Chrétien were later to claim that he had wanted to support the GST bill, but his caucus had forced him to oppose it against his will. At a Liberal event in the fall of 1990, Chrétien stated that if he became prime minister, "the Mulroney GST will disappear", going on to say: "I am opposed to the GST. I have always been opposed to it. And I will be opposed to it, always". To capitalize on widespread public dislike of the proposed GST, Chrétien ordered the Liberal-dominated Senate to defeat the GST bill in late September 1990, leading Mulroney on September 27, 1990, to appoint eight PC senators to give the Tories a majority using a never-before-used section of the Constitution Act, the so-called "Deadlock Clause". At that point, Chrétien ordered the Liberal senators to filibuster the GST bill, reducing the Senate to scenes of chaos for the entire fall of 1990. On October 24, 1990, a poll revealed that the Liberals had fallen behind the New Democrats, which Chrétien admitted in an interview might have something to do with the scenes of obstructionist, often childish behavior by the Liberal senators.

In December 1990, Chrétien returned to the House of Commons after winning a by-election in the safe Liberal riding of Beauséjour in New Brunswick. The incumbent, Fernand Robichaud, stood down in Chrétien's favour, which is traditional practice when a newly elected party leader does not have a seat in the Commons. Initially, Chrétien had planned to wait until the next general election before running, but was advised by Herb Gray that: "To have credibility, you're got to be in the House. You can't afford to wait two more years until a general election." Gray's appeal changed Chrétien's mind about when to seek a seat in the House of Commons. For much of 1991–92, Chrétien found himself emotionally exhausted after his adopted son Michel was charged with kidnapping, rape, and sodomy against a Montreal woman and was convicted.Michel Chrétien suffered from fetal alcohol spectrum disorder and had a long history of legal trouble.

In October 1991, Chrétien first expressed his views about how best to end the recession which had begun in 1990, arguing that the answer was a policy of slow devaluation in which the dollar would be allowed to decline against other major world currencies; this would have the effect of both pricing out foreign imports and, by giving Canadian firms a competitive advantage in world markets, boosting exports. However, Chrétien concluded that his planned export offensive, powered by a low dollar, would come to nothing if other nations maintained tariffs to keep Canadian goods out of their markets. In order to make his plans to export Canada back into prosperity work, Chrétien decided that the solution was globalization. Besides globalization, Chrétien also argued that, to combat the recession, the federal government needed to make the system of unemployment insurance less generous and to end the policy of high interest rates maintained by Bank of Canada governor John Crow to achieve his target of zero per cent inflation, which Chrétien argued was needlessly crippling the economy.

In November 1991, Chrétien organized a party conference in Aylmer, Quebec, where the Liberals formally disavowed most of the economic nationalism and protectionism of the Pearson-Trudeau years and instead embraced globalization as the cure for the ongoing recession. Reflecting this changed emphasis, the Liberals declared their support for the free trade agreement with the United States, which the party had famously promised to tear up if they won the 1988 election; instead, Mulroney was now denounced for not going far enough in opening up the economy by signing more free trade agreements with other nations.

Chrétien revealed himself to be a staunch "hard federalist" favouring a strong federal government at the expense of the provinces, much along the same lines as his predecessor Trudeau. However, unlike Trudeau, Chrétien supported the Charlottetown Accord of August 1992, another package of constitutional amendments which proposed devolving federal powers to the provinces and once again recognized Quebec as a "distinct society". Chrétien endorsed the Charlottetown Accord on the rather negative grounds that the constitutional debates of the late 1980s and early 1990s were destroying Canada, saying it "was bleeding the nation to death" and that Charlottetown was the best way of ending that debate in order to move the focus back to the economic recession. At a Liberal caucus meeting on September 8, 1992, Chrétien declared that "if we had been the government we would not have made this deal", and that only reason to support Charlottetown was that rejecting it would increase support for Quebec separatism.

When Mulroney began to lose ground in the polls, Chrétien was the major beneficiary. In preparation for the 1993 election, Chrétien won the right to have final approval over riding nominations and to veto any candidate that displeased him. Chrétien's use of this power caused some protests within the party, with John Nunziata publicly complaining, "The backroom guys have taken control of the party. I guess they think they can muzzle us all". Chrétien was so confident that he was going to win the 1993 election that he formed his transition team in October 1992 to prepare for the hand-over of power 13 months before it actually happened.

==== The 1993 election ====
Mulroney announced his retirement in February, and was succeeded by Minister of National Defence Kim Campbell in June. Campbell pulled the PCs to within a few percentage points of the Liberals by the time the writs were dropped in September.

On September 19, Chrétien released the Liberal platform. The 112-page document, Creating Opportunity, quickly became known as the Red Book because of its bright red cover. Chrétien's rival Paul Martin, who led the team that produced the Red Book, was less complimentary about it in private; he was often reported to have said: "Don't tell me about the Red Book, I wrote the damn thing, and I know that it is a lot of crap!"

The Liberals promised to remove the GST, which had previously been imposed by the Tories. Sheila Copps famously promised to resign within a year of taking office if the GST was not repealed. Chrétien also promised to renegotiate the North American Free Trade Agreement (NAFTA), and reform the unemployment insurance system. The Liberals were in favour of a free trade agreement for North America in principle, but accused Mulroney of having given away too much to the Americans and Mexicans when he signed NAFTA in 1992, and stated that the Liberal government would renegotiate NAFTA on more favourable terms to Canada within six months of taking office. Failing that, Chrétien promised that Canada would renounce NAFTA. The main emphasis was on a promise to spend $6 billion on improving infrastructure in a Keynesian move to fight the recession of the early 1990s. Regarding the debt, Chrétien promised to reduce Canada's deficit to 3 per cent of GDP (the same deficit-to-GDP ratio required to enter the European Union) within three years of taking office. Chrétien made it clear that the 3 per cent deficit-to-GDP ratio would apply only to the federal government, whereas the Maastricht Treaty of 1991, which set out the 3 per cent deficit-to-GDP ratio in order to enter the European Union stated that this applied to all levels of government. The Liberal government promised to achieve its goal of reducing the deficit to three percent of the GDP by cancelling the contract to replace the Sea King helicopters, privatizing Toronto Pearson Airport, and by eliminating unspecified "waste" in the government. After the 3 percent target had been achieved within the first three years of taking office, Chrétien promised the deficit would be eliminated at some unspecified time in the future. Martin wanted to promise to eliminate the deficit altogether, but had been overruled by Chrétien, who had wanted to present the Liberals as the "caring" party that would defend social programs, unlike the "heartless" Conservatives and the Reform Party who Chrétien claimed wanted to eliminate the deficit within two or three years by gutting social programs with no thought for any suffering that this might cause. Chrétien claimed in his campaign speeches that Reform's plans for eliminating the deficit within two or three years of taking office would cause at least a 25 per cent unemployment rate, if not higher, which Chrétien claimed starkly in a series of speeches would cause a bloody "revolution". Chrétien had personally chosen the target of reducing the deficit to 3 per cent of GDP because it made the Liberals seem fiscally responsible while also promising that the Liberals would not inflict too much economic pain to achieve that fiscal responsibility. One Liberal candidate, Herb Dhaliwal, recalled that that, for Chrétien at the time of the 1993 election, the national deficit was not a major issue and that: "His attitude was that the deficit is ok as long as you can manage it".

But last night, the Conservative Party reached a new low; they tried to make fun of the way I look. God gave me a physical defect, and I accepted that since I'm a kid. [sic] It's true, that I speak on one side of my mouth. I'm not a Tory, I don't speak on both sides of my mouth.

— Jean Chretien responding to the "face ad", 1993. Source video

By late September 1993, the Liberals had a double-digit lead in most opinion polls, and by October they were favourites to win at least a minority government. Even at this stage, however, Chrétien's personal approval ratings were far behind those of Campbell. Realizing this, the PC campaign team released a series of ads attacking Chrétien. The ads were viewed as a last-ditch effort to keep the Liberals from winning a majority. The second ad, released on October 14, appeared to mock Chrétien's facial paralysis and generated a severe backlash from all sides. Even some Tory candidates called for the ad to be removed. Campbell was not directly responsible for the ad, and ordered it off the air over her staff's objections.

On October 25, the Liberals were elected to a majority government, winning 177 seats – the third-best performance in the Liberals' history, and their most impressive win since their record of 190 seats in 1949. The PCs were nearly wiped out, winning only two seats in the worst defeat ever suffered by a governing party at the federal level. Chrétien himself yielded Beauséjour back to Robichaud in order to run in his old riding, Saint-Maurice. However, he was unable to lead the Liberals back to their traditional dominance in Quebec, being one of only four Liberal MPs elected from that province outside the Montreal area. With few exceptions, most of the support that had switched from the Liberals to the PCs nine years earlier switched to the Bloc Québécois, which became the Official Opposition.

== Prime Minister (1993–2003) ==
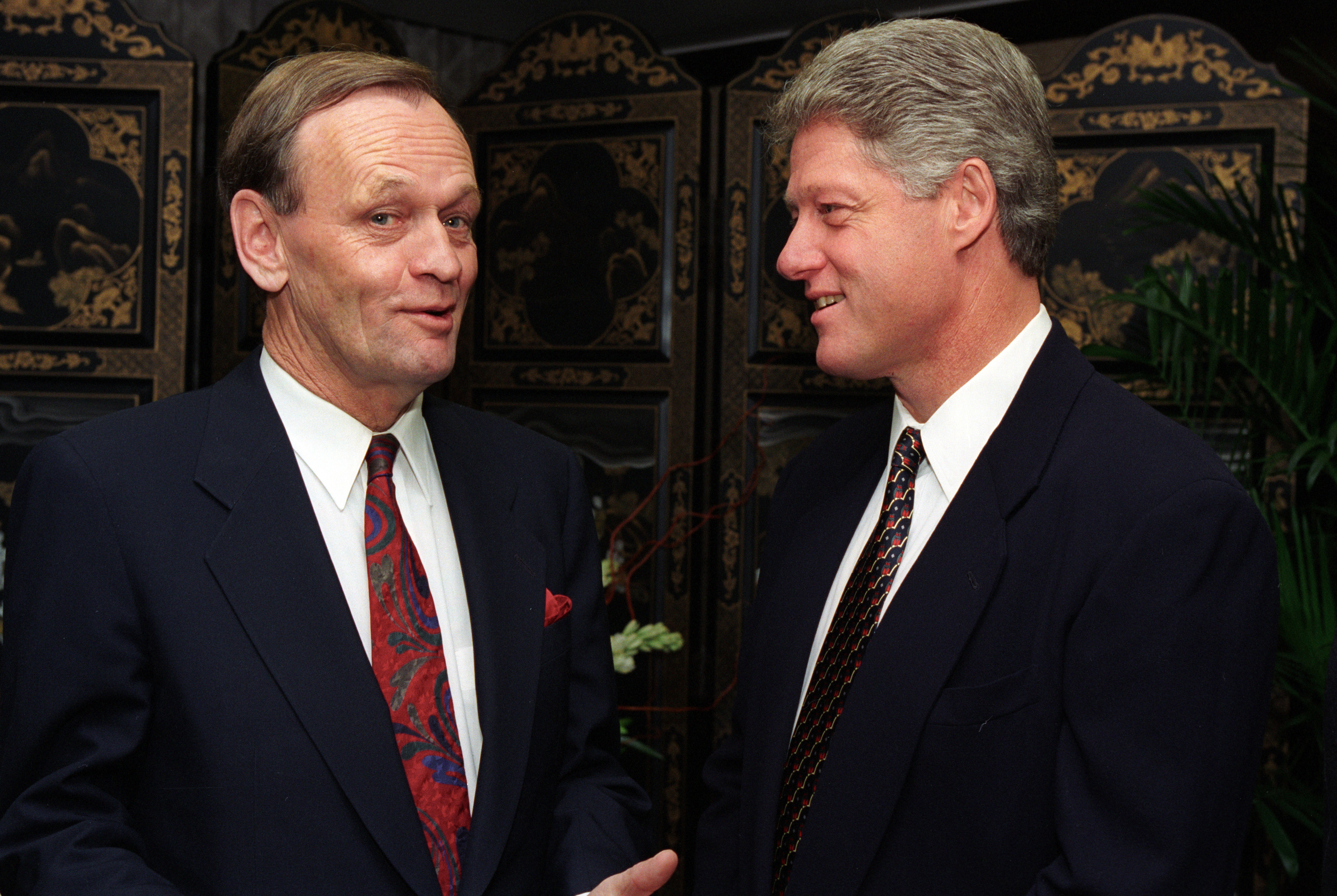
Jean Chrétien with U.S. President Bill Clinton during the Asia-Pacific Economic Cooperation summit in Seattle, November 17–19, 1993

On November 4, 1993, Chrétien became prime minister. While Trudeau, Joe Clark, and Mulroney had been relative political outsiders prior to becoming prime minister, Chrétien had served in every Liberal cabinet since 1965. This experience gave him knowledge of the Canadian parliamentary system and allowed Chrétien to establish a very centralized government that, although highly efficient, was also lambasted by critics such as Jeffrey Simpson and the media as a "friendly dictatorship" that was intolerant of internal dissent. Chrétien liked to present himself as the heir to Trudeau, but his governing style had little in common with the intense bouts of governmental activism that had characterised the Trudeau era. The Chrétien government had a cautious, managerial approach to governing, reacting to issues as they arose, and was otherwise inclined to inactivity.

=== Quebec ===
==== 1995 Quebec referendum ====
One of Chrétien's main concerns in office was separation of the province of Quebec, which was governed by the sovereigntist Parti Québécois for nearly the entirety of his term. When the 1995 Quebec independence referendum began in September, Chrétien was relaxed and confident of victory as polls showed federalist forces were leading by a wide margin. On October 8, 1995, Lucien Bouchard replaced the separatist premier of Quebec, Jacques Parizeau, as the de facto chair of the oui committee and, at that point, the support for the oui side started to dramatically increase, aided by the non committee's complacency. In the weeks leading to the referendum on October 30, 1995, the federal government grew concerned as polls showed that, under the leadership of Bouchard, the oui side was going to win. On October 30, 1995, the federalist non side won by the narrowest of margins, with 50.58%.

==== Aftermath of referendum ====
On November 5, 1995, six days after the referendum, Chrétien and his wife escaped injury when André Dallaire, armed with a knife, broke in the prime minister's official residence at 24 Sussex Drive. Aline Chrétien shut and locked the bedroom door until security came, while Chrétien held a stone Inuit carving in readiness. Dallaire was a separatist who was angered by the result of the referendum.

In the aftermath of the narrow victory in the referendum, Chrétien adopted a new policy of "tough love" in late 1995, also known as "Plan B", under which the federal government sought to discredit Quebec separatism by making it clear to the people of Quebec how difficult it would be to leave Canada. Though Chrétien had promised to enshrine recognition of Quebec as a "distinct society" in the constitution in order to win the referendum, this promise was not fulfilled in the aftermath of victory with Chrétien arguing that the very vocal opposition of Ontario Premier Mike Harris to amending the constitution to recognize Quebec as a "distinct society" made that impossible. Instead, Chrétien had Parliament pass a resolution recognizing Quebec as a "distinct society", which had no constitutional force and was only a symbolic step. Though Harris's promise to veto any sort of "distinct society" clause in the constitution made fulfilling Chrétien's commitment to put such a clause into the constitution impossible, Chrétien did not seem to champion the idea of a "distinct society" clause with any great conviction.

In early 1996, the federal government launched an advertising program to increase the presence of Canada in Quebec, a policy that Chrétien believed would avoid a repeat of the near-defeat of 1995, and would eventually lead to the sponsorship scandal. As part of his "Plan B" for combatting Quebec separatism, in a speech in January 1996, Chrétien endorsed the idea of partitioning Quebec in the event of a oui vote in another referendum, stating that all regions of Quebec that voted non would remain part of Canada, regardless of what the Quebec separatists thought. On February 15, 1996, Chrétien was confronted by a protester, Bill Clennett, during a walkabout in Hull, Quebec. Chrétien responded with a chokehold, which was referred to by the press as the "Shawinigan handshake", after Chrétien's hometown.

==== Clarity Act ====
After the 1995 referendum very narrowly defeated a proposal on Quebec sovereignty, Chrétien started to champion what eventually became the Clarity Act as part of his "Plan B". In August 1996, the lawyer Guy Bertrand won a ruling in a Quebec court declaring that the sovereignty question was not just a political matter between the federal and Quebec governments, but also a legal matter subject to court rulings. Following that ruling, Chrétien decided that this was a means of defeating the Quebec sovereignty movement and, in September 1996, ordered Justice Minister Allan Rock to take the question of the legality of Quebec separating to the Supreme Court. Stéphane Dion advised Chrétien that, if the federal government won the reference to the Supreme Court as expected, the government should draft a bill stating the precise rules for Quebec to leave—telling Chrétien if the people of Quebec could be shown how difficult it would be to leave, then support for separatism would fall. Along the same lines, Dion started to send much-publicised open letters to Quebec ministers questioning the assumptions behind the separatist case.

In December 1999, the Chrétien government tabled the Clarity Act, which passed Parliament in June 2000. The Clarity Act, which was Chrétien's response to his narrow victory in the 1995 referendum, requires that no Canadian government may acknowledge any province's declaration of independence unless a "clear majority" supports a "clear question" about sovereignty in a referendum, as defined by the Parliament of Canada, and a constitutional amendment is passed. The size of a "clear majority" is not specified in the Act. After the Clarity Act had passed by the House of Commons in February 2000, a poll showed that the federalist forces enjoyed a 15 per cent lead in the polls on the question of whether Quebec should become independent, which Chrétien argued meant that the sovereignty option was now effectively off the table as Bouchard had always said he would only call another referendum if he could obtain "winning conditions", which he plainly did not possess at the moment.

=== Domestic affairs ===
In November 1997, the Asia-Pacific Economic Cooperation (APEC) summit was held on the University of British Columbia (UBC) campus in Vancouver. Students on UBC's campus protested the meeting because of the poor human rights practices of some of the attending leaders; one of the leaders most criticized was Indonesian president Suharto. Demonstrators tore down a barrier and were pepper-sprayed by the Royal Canadian Mounted Police (RCMP), with other peaceful demonstrators being subsequently pepper-sprayed as well. There was debate over whether the action was necessary. In response to Suharto's concerns about his "dignity" being called into question by protests, the Canadian government had promised him that no protesters would be allowed to get close, and in early August 1997, the PMO informed the RCMP that the prime minister did not wish for any "distractions" at the upcoming conference. Later that day, Chrétien, when asked by Nardwuar the Human Serviette about the use of pepper-spray, stated "...For me, pepper, I put it on my plate." On August 7, 2001, the APEC report was issued by Judge Ted Hughes; it cleared Chrétien of wrongdoing, but stated that the PMO's Jean Carle had improperly pressured the RCMP to attack the protesters.

In August 1999, the Anglo-Canadian media magnate Conrad Black was due to receive a British life peerage. Two days before Black was to receive his title, Chrétien advised Queen Elizabeth II not to accord Black a title of nobility, citing the 1917 Nickle Resolution whereby the Canadian House of Commons asked King George V not to grant any hereditary peerages or knighthoods to Canadians, thereby ensuring that Black was not raised to the peerage as he was expecting to be. A humiliated Black sued Chrétien for what he alleged to be an abuse of power, leading to the legal case of Black v Chrétien. In 2001, the Court of Appeal for Ontario ruled in Chrétien's favour, stating it was the prime minister's prerogative to advise the Queen not to give Canadians a British peerage if he felt so inclined, and therefore it was not an abuse of power as Black had claimed. Black gave up his Canadian citizenship to accept the peerage.

==== Electoral affairs ====
In July 2003, Chrétien passed a bill to reform the way elections are financed. In the previous century, the political parties were largely left to their own devices. After these changes to the Canada Elections Act (SC 2000), each vote obtained by a party was subsidized. The subsidy entered into effect on January 1, 2004, at $1.75 per vote (indexed to the Consumer Price Index) as part of a set of amendments made by the 37th Canadian Parliament to the Canada Elections Act that, for the first time, set limits on political contributions by individuals and organizations (corporations, unions, non-profit groups). The per-vote subsidy was introduced to reduce the reliance of political parties and candidates on corporate, union, and wealthy donors in order to reduce the political influence of such donors. The law provided a refund for 50% of the expenditure on the most recent election campaign.

==== Social issues ====
In 1995, the Chrétien government introduced and passed the Canadian Firearms Registry, also called the long-gun registry. This required the registration of all non-restricted firearms in Canada. The gun registry was designed to record information about the firearms, their owners, and their owners' licenses.

Chrétien's government introduced a new and far-reaching Youth Criminal Justice Act in April 2003, which replaced the Young Offenders Act and changed the way youths were prosecuted for crimes in Canada. A flurry of major environmental legislation, including the Canadian Environmental Protection Act, National Marine Conservation Areas Act, Pest Control Products Act, and the Species at Risk Act were enacted. The cooperation of federal, provincial, and municipal governments also enabled Vancouver to win the bid to host the 2010 Winter Olympics.

In July 2003, Chrétien reversed his position on gay marriage, which he had previously opposed (in 1999, Chrétien had voted for a resolution sponsored by the Reform Party stating that marriage was a union of a man and a woman only). After a Toronto court ruled that laws forbidding homosexual marriage violated the Charter of Rights and Freedoms, legalizing same-sex marriage throughout Ontario, Chrétien embraced the idea of gay marriage and introduced a bill in the House of Commons that would have legalized gay marriage despite strong opposition from the Roman Catholic Church, with the bishop of Calgary warning in a sermon that Chrétien's "eternal salvation" was at risk.

=== Economic policy ===
Chrétien cancelled the privatization of Toronto's Pearson airport. The consortium that was due to take ownership of Pearson sued for breach of contract, which led the government to settle out of court in April 1997 for $60 million in damages.

The first budget introduced by Martin, in February 1994, was described as a "mild and tame" budget focused only on the target of reducing the deficit to 3 per cent of gross national product (GNP) within three years, and brought in modest cuts, mostly to defence spending. Until the terrorist attacks of September 11, 2001, the Chrétien government tended to oppose increases in defence spending, with the government's white paper "Defence 94" declaring that in a post-Cold War world there would be less need for armed forces, which accordingly meant reduced budgets for the military. Outside of defence spending, there were few cuts in the 1994 budget. In a radio interview with Ron Collister in March 1994, Chrétien stated: "To go to our goal of 3 per cent of GNP, all the cuts have been announced in the budget. There will not be a new round." According to the diplomat James Bartleman, Chrétien told him in early 1994 that major cuts to government spending outside of defence were out of the question, and instead he hoped that the economy would grow enough on its own that the deficit would disappear without any cuts. Chrétien's plans in early 1994 for economic growth were to increase exports by embracing globalization and free trade with as many nations as possible, arguing that the export offensive would stimulate the economy out of the early 1990s recession. The 1994 budget was widely criticized by journalists such as Andrew Coyne as useless in even achieving its target of reducing the deficit to 3 percent of GNP within three years, let alone eliminating the deficit, and led to a celebrated clash between Coyne and Martin in the boardroom of The Globe and Mail newspaper. In April 1994, interest rates in Canada started a steady rise that would continue until early 1995.

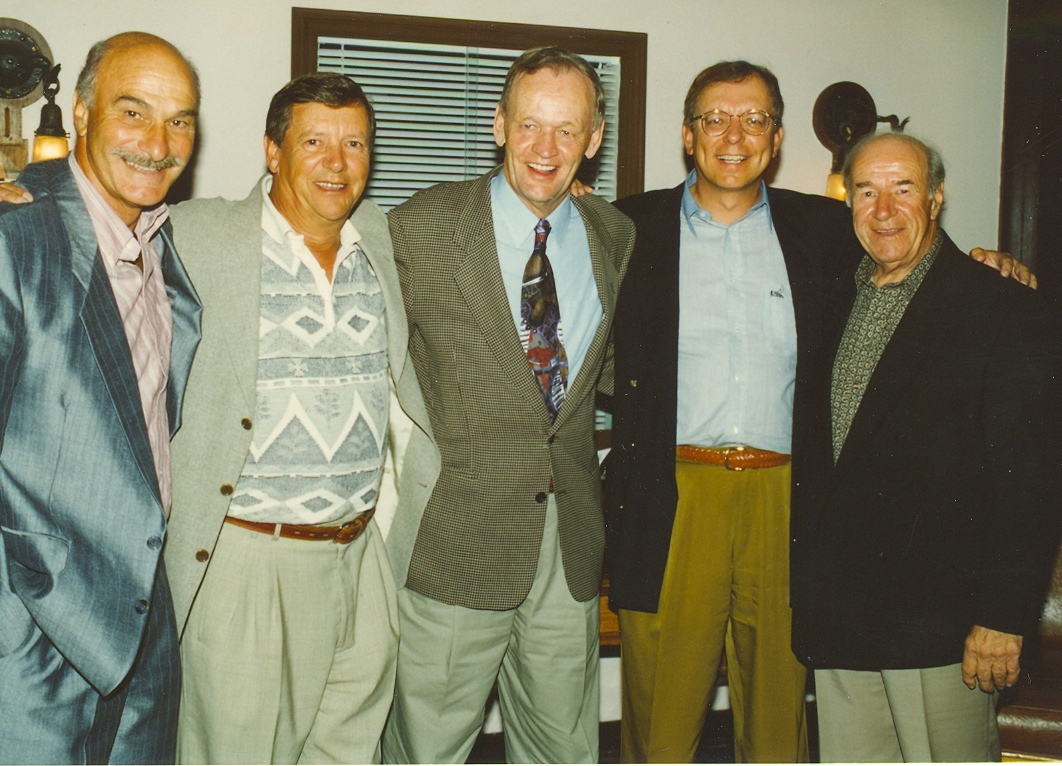
Chrétien in 1996

Chrétien was not keen on making deep cuts to government spending, but, given the crisis caused by skyrocketing interest rates, had decided "reluctantly" there was no alternative. Once he had decided to make deeper cuts than he had promised, Chrétien proved to be a firm supporter of the new course, and supported Martin's cuts to other departments despite the complaints of the other ministers. Chrétien's adviser Eddie Goldenberg later recalled that Chrétien was unyielding in the face of efforts by other ministers to "spare" their departments, and that Chrétien kept saying "If I change anything, everything will unravel". In a 2011 interview, Chrétien recalled about the 1995 budget that: "There would have been a day when we would have been the Greece of today. I knew we were in a bind and we had to do something." In order to silence objections from left-wing Liberal backbenchers and Cabinet ministers, Chrétien ensured that the Program Review Committee chaired by Marcel Massé that would decide which programs to end and which to cut had a majority comprising the left-wing MPs Brian Tobin, Sheila Copps, Sergio Marchi and Herb Gray, people who would not normally support program cuts, and thereby underlined the seriousness of the crisis. It was only with the budget that Martin introduced on February 27, 1995, that the Chrétien government began a policy of cuts designed to eliminate the deficit in order to reassure the markets. Much of the Liberal caucus was deeply unhappy with the 1995 budget, arguing that this was not what they had been elected for in 1993, only to be informed by the prime minister that there was no alternative. Chrétien himself expressed his unhappiness with his budget in a radio interview with Peter Gzowski in March 1995, saying about the budget: "It is not our pleasure sir, I have to tell you that. I've been around a long time. It's no pleasure at all. I'm not doctrinaire, a right-winger. I'm a Liberal, and I feel like a Liberal, and it is painful. But it is needed".

The government began a program of deep cuts to provincial transfers and other areas of government finance. During his tenure as prime minister, a $42 billion deficit was eliminated, five consecutive budget surpluses were recorded (thanks in part to favourable economic conditions), $36 billion in debt was paid down, and taxes were cut by $100 billion over five years in total. Using the low-income cut-offs after-tax measure, the percentage of Canadians who had low income in 1993 was 14.1 per cent; in 1995, when the budget was introduced, that figure had jumped to 14.5 per cent; in 2003, the end of Chrétien's time in office, that number had fallen to just 11.6 per cent. The share of Canadians living in persistent poverty (i.e., having a low income for at least three out of six years) has declined by almost half since the mid-1990s to 2010. Social spending as a percentage of GDP fell from 20.35 percent in 1993, to 18.35 percent in 1995, eventually falling to 16.94 percent in 1997 and 15.76 percent in 2000, and eventually rising to 16.29 percent in 2003. The 1995 budget, which was called by Peter C. Newman a "watershed document" that marked the first time in recent memory that anybody had made a serious effort to deal with the deficit, won a favourable reaction from the international markets, and led to an immediate fall in interest rates. There were, however, undeniable costs associated with this endeavour. The cuts resulted in fewer government services, most noticeably in the health care sector, as major reductions in federal funding to the provinces meant significant cuts in service delivery. Moreover, the across-the-board cuts affected the operations and achievement of the mandate of most federal departments. Many of the cuts were restored in later years of Chrétien's period in office.

In March 1996, when the Chrétien government presented its third budget, the backbencher Liberal MP John Nunziata voted against the budget on the grounds that it failed to repeal the GST as the Liberals had promised in 1993 and singled out for criticism his former Rat Pack colleague, Sheila Copps,, who had promised during the 1993 election to resign within a year if the GST was not repealed. Chrétien's response was to expel Nunziata from the Liberal caucus. However, the expulsion of Nunziata drew attention to the fact that Copps was still in office despite her promise to resign within a year if the GST was not repealed. Chrétien first stated that Copps would stay in Parliament despite her promise of 1993, but then intense public pressure (together with a poll showing Copps would win a by-election) forced Copps to resign from Parliament. After resigning, Copps then contested the resulting by-election, which she won, before returning to cabinet. To help defuse anger over the GST issue, in the spring of 1996, the Chrétien government moved to harmonize sales taxes (GST with provincial taxes) by signing an accord with three of the four Atlantic provinces; the other provinces were not interested in the federal offer to harmonize.

In February 1998, for the first time since 1969, a balanced budget was presented by the government. Shortly afterwards, the Chrétien government introduced the National Child Benefit program for the children of low-income parents.

=== Foreign policy ===
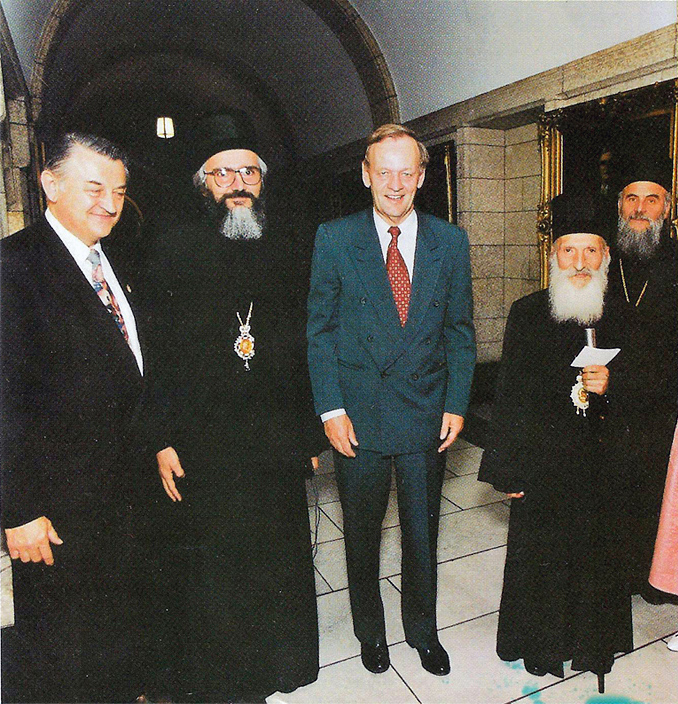
Chrétien with Bishops and the Patriarch of the Serbian Orthodox Church, 1994.

==== Canada in the Yugoslav Wars ====
In 1999, Chrétien supported Canada's involvement in the North Atlantic Treaty Organization (NATO) bombing campaign of Yugoslavia over the issue of Kosovo, even though the operation was unsanctioned by the United Nations Security Council. There had been an Anglo-American resolution asking for the Security Council's approval of the NATO bombing, but it was vetoed by Russia. The proposal to bomb Yugoslavia caused some discomfort within the ranks of the Liberal party as the NATO campaign effectively meant supporting Kosovo separatists against a government determined to prevent Kosovo's secession from Yugoslavia. Chrétien was personally uncomfortable with the idea of bombing Yugoslavia, but supported the war because he valued good relations with the United States far more than he cared about Yugoslavia. Chrétien's foreign minister at the time, Lloyd Axworthy, justified Canada's involvement in the bombing of Yugoslavia on the grounds that allegations of massacres against ethnic Albanians in Kosovo made the use of force legitimate on humanitarian grounds, even without the approval of the UN Security Council. Likewise, Chrétien was later to tell Lawrence Martin that it was far better to intervene in the internal affairs of Yugoslavia to stop human rights violations in the Kosovo region by Serbian forces than to do nothing.<

==== China ====
Chrétien was known to be a Sinophile and an admirer of the People's Republic of China. In November 1994, he led the first of four "Team Canada" trade missions to China, comprising himself and nine premiers (Quebec Premier Jacques Parizeau having declined to go), which had the stated objective of increasing Sino-Canadian trade. The Team Canada mission was meant to be the beginning of the export offensive that would stimulate the economy out of the recession, and also to achieve Chrétien's goal going back to the 1970s of a Canadian economy less dependent on trade with the United States. Under his leadership, China and Canada signed several bilateral relations agreements. The Team Canada missions attracted criticism that Chrétien seemed concerned only with economic issues, that he rarely raised the subject of China's poor human rights record, and that on the few occasions that he did mention human rights in China he went out of his way to avoid offending his hosts. Moreover, Chrétien attracted criticism for presenting the case for improved human rights in purely economic terms, arguing that a better human rights record would allow China to join the WTO and thus sell more goods to the West. Chrétien argued that there was no point in criticizing China's human rights record because the Chinese never listened to such criticism, and instead were greatly annoyed about being lectured by Western leaders about their poor human rights record. Given that Canada could not really do anything to change the views of China's leaders about human rights, Chrétien contended that the best that could be done was to improve Sino-Canadian economic relations while ignoring the subject of human rights.

==== United States ====
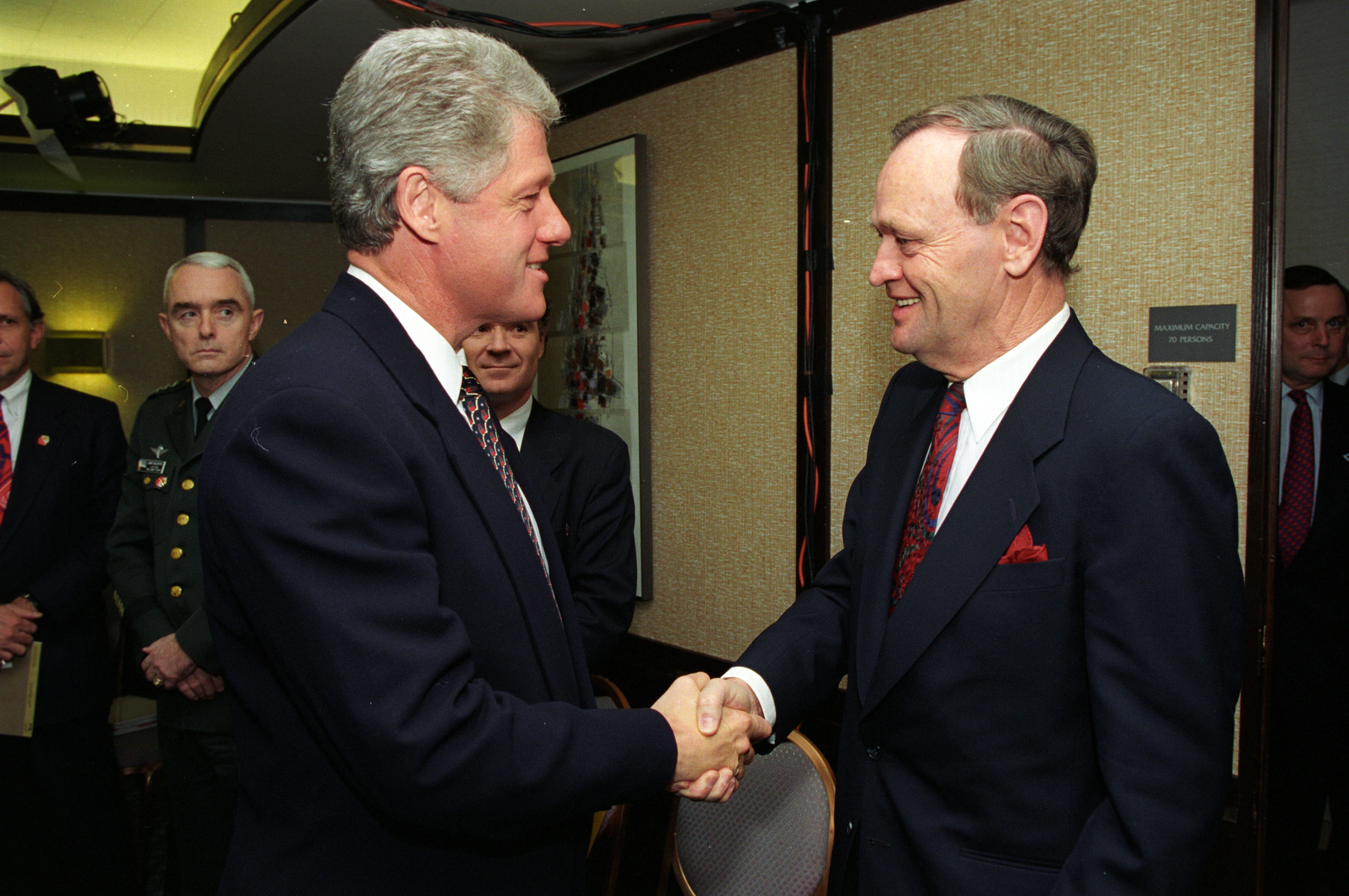
Chrétien shaking hands with U.S. President Bill Clinton, at the 1993 APEC Summit.

Chrétien phoned U.S. President Bill Clinton in November 1993 to ask him to renegotiate aspects of NAFTA. Clinton bluntly refused, saying that it had been extremely difficult to get Congress to ratify NAFTA, and if NAFTA was renegotiated, then he would have to submit the renegotiated treaty again for ratification, which was not something that he was going to do just for the sake of Chrétien. Clinton informed the prime minister that he could either scrap NAFTA or accept it as it was, and that the most he could offer were a few cosmetic concessions like writing a letter saying the United States was not interested in taking over Canada's energy and water. Chrétien chose the latter, and sought to portray Clinton's letter as a major American concession that constituted a renegotiated NAFTA, though in fact Clinton's letter was not legally binding and meant nothing. Only treaties ratified by Congress are legally binding on the U.S. government and presidential letters impose only a moral obligation, not a legal one, on the U.S. government.

Following the September 11 attacks, Canadian forces joined with a multinational coalition to pursue al-Qaeda in Afghanistan. U.S. President George W. Bush had also commended how Canada responded to the crisis. These included Operation Yellow Ribbon and the memorial service on Parliament Hill three days after 9/11. In January 2002, Chrétien, together with Defence Minister Art Eggleton, was accused of misleading Parliament. When asked in Question Period if Canadian troops had handed over captured Taliban and al-Qaeda members in Afghanistan to the American forces amid concerns about the treatment of POWs at Guantanamo Bay, Chrétien stated this was only a "hypothetical question" that could not be answered as Canadian forces had taken no prisoners of war. Critics of the government, such as Joe Clark, then pointed out that in the previous week, The Globe & Mail had run on its front page a photo of Canadian soldiers turning over POWs to American troops. Eggleton claimed that he had only learned of the policy of handing over POWs several days after the photo had appeared in The Globe and Mail. When pressed by opposition critics about his apparent ignorance of what was Canada's policy on turning over POWs captured in Afghanistan, Eggleton then claimed that he had not only forgotten that he had been briefed by senior bureaucrats that Canadian Forces were to hand over POWs to the Americans, but that he had also forgotten to inform the Cabinet.

One year after the 9/11 attacks, Chrétien made controversial remarks about what led to the attacks, suggesting they were a reaction to Western foreign policy. During a 2002 CBC interview, Chrétien said "I do think that the Western world is getting too rich in relations to the poor world. And necessarily, we're looked upon as being arrogant, self-satisfied, greedy and with no limits. And the 11th of September is an occasion for me to realize it even more. When you are powerful like you are, you guys, it's the time to be nice. And it is one of the problems—you cannot exercise your powers to the point of humiliation of the others. And that is what the Western world—not only the Americans but the Western world—has to realize." The comments were condemned by the new leader of the Official Opposition and the Canadian Alliance, Stephen Harper, who charged Chrétien with victim blaming, while the leaders of the New Democratic Party and Progressive Conservative Party did not interpret Chrétien's comments as critical of the United States.

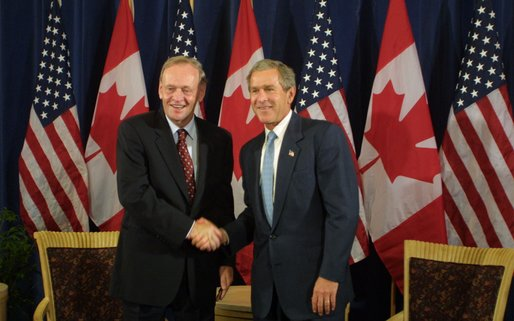
President George W. Bush and Jean Chrétien address the media before a 2002 bilateral meeting.

==== Refusal to join the Iraq War ====
Chrétien announced in Parliament that the government did not support the U.S.-led 2003 invasion of Iraq. His reasoning was that the war lacked UN Security Council sanction; while not a member of the Security Council, Canada nevertheless attempted to build a consensus for a resolution authorizing the use of force after a short (two- to three-month) extension to UN weapon inspections in Iraq. Critics also noted that, while in opposition, he had also opposed the first U.S.-led Gulf War, which had been approved by the UN Security Council and that in 1999 he had supported NATO air strikes against Serbia, which had no Security Council approval.

In order to avoid damaging relations with the United States, Chrétien agreed to another and larger deployment of Canadian troops to Afghanistan on February 12, 2003, in order to prove that Canada was still a good American ally, despite opposing the upcoming Iraq war. Canada sent 2,000 soldiers to Afghanistan in the summer of 2003.

Twenty years later, Chrétien revealed that people on the street thanked him for keeping Canada out of the Iraq war. In a French-language interview, Chrétien recalled the personalities and events that led up to his refusal. At the time, some in the business community feared that the U.S. would look elsewhere for Canadian products; 85% of Canadian trade was with the U.S..

=== Defence policy ===
In 1993, Chrétien cancelled the contract to buy the EH-101 helicopters, requiring the search for new helicopters to start over, and paid a $478 million termination fee to AgustaWestland.

In January 1998, Chrétien's government announced that the CH-113 helicopters would be replaced by a scaled-down search-and-rescue variant of the EH101, carrying the designation CH-149 Cormorant. Unlike the Petrel/Chimo contract which Chrétien had cancelled in 1993, these 15 aircraft were to be built entirely in Europe with no Canadian participation or industrial incentives. The first two aircraft arrived in Canada in September 2001 and entered service the following year. His Maritime Helicopter Project was supposed to find a low-cost replacement aircraft. The candidates were the Sikorsky S-92, the NHIndustries NH90 and the EH-101, although critics accused the government of designing the project so as to prevent AgustaWestland from winning the contract. A winner, the Sikorsky CH-148 Cyclone, would not be announced until after Chrétien retired.

=== Reelections ===
==== 1997 federal election ====
Chrétien called an early election in the spring of 1997, hoping to take advantage of his position in the public opinion polls and the continued division of the conservative vote between the Progressive Conservative Party and the upstart Reform Party of Canada. Despite slipping poll numbers, he advised the governor general to call an election in 1997, a year ahead of schedule. Many of his own MPs criticized him for this move, especially in light of the devastating Red River Flood, which led to charges of insensitivity. Liberal MP John Godfrey tried hard to interest Chrétien in an ambitious plan to eliminate urban poverty in Canada as a platform to run on in the election, which was vetoed by Eddie Goldenberg and John Rae of the PMO, who convinced Chrétien that it was better to stick with an "incrementalist" course of small changes than risk any grand project. The Progressive Conservatives had a popular new leader in Jean Charest and the New Democrats' Alexa McDonough led her party to a breakthrough in Atlantic Canada, where the Liberals had won all but one seat in 1993. Chrétien benefited when the Reform Party aired a TV ad in English Canada charging that the country was being dominated by French-Canadian politicians, which Chrétien used to accuse Preston Manning of being anti-French. In 1997, the Liberals lost all but a handful of seats in Atlantic Canada and Western Canada, but managed to retain a bare majority government due to their continued dominance of Ontario.

==== 2000 federal election ====
Chrétien called another early election in the fall of 2000, again hoping to take advantage of the split in the Canadian right and catch the newly formed Canadian Alliance and its neophyte leader Stockwell Day off guard. At the funeral of Pierre Trudeau in September 2000, Cuban president Fidel Castro happened to meet with Day. Later that same day, Chrétien met with Castro, where Chrétien asked Castro about his assessment of Day and if he should call an early election or not. Castro advised Chrétien to dissolve Parliament early as he considered Day to be a lightweight, and as Castro was a leader whom Chrétien respected, his advice was an important reason for the election. Finance Minister Paul Martin released a 'mini-budget' just before the election call that included significant tax cuts, a move aimed at undermining the Alliance position going into the campaign. Chrétien formed a "war room" comprising his communications director Françoise Ducros, Warren Kinsella, Duncan Fulton and Kevin Bosch to gather material to attack Day as a right-wing extremist. In the first weeks of the 2000 election campaign, the Canadian Alliance gained in the polls and some voters complained that Chrétien had overstayed his time in office and had no agenda beyond staying in power for the sake of staying in power. The fact that the Red Book of 2000 consisted almost entirely of recycled promises from the Red Books of 1993 and 1997 and various banal statements further reinforced the impression of a prime minister with no plans or vision for Canada and whose only agenda was to hang onto power as long as possible. However, the Liberal claim that Day planned to dismantle the health care system to replace it with a "two-tier" health care system along with a number of gaffes on Day's part in addition to Alliance candidate Betty Granger warning that Canada was faced with the threat of an "Asian invasion" (which furthered the Liberals' plan to paint the Alliance as a xenophobic and extreme right-wing party) started to turn opinion decisively against the Canadian Alliance. Day's socially conservative views were also attacked by Chrétien as the Liberals claimed that Day would make homosexuality and abortion illegal. The New Democrats and Bloc Québécois also ran lacklustre campaigns, while the Progressive Conservatives, led by former prime minister Joe Clark, struggled to retain official party status. On November 27, the Liberals secured a strong majority mandate in the 2000 election, winning nearly as many seats as they had in 1993, largely thanks to significant gains in Quebec and Atlantic Canada. Without Jean Charest as leader, the PCs, who had done well in winning the popular vote in Quebec in 1997, fared poorly in 2000, and most of their voters defected over to the Liberals.

=== Scandals and controversies ===
==== Shawinigate ====
In late 2000 and early 2001, politics were dominated by questions about the Grand-Mère Affair (or the Shawinigate scandal). Opposition parties frequently charged that Chrétien had broken the law regarding his lobbying the Business Development Bank of Canada for loans to the Auberge Grand-Mère inn. Questions centred particularly on the dismissal of the president of the bank, François Beaudoin, and the involvement of Jean Carle, formerly of the PMO, in sacking Beaudoin. Carle served as Chrétien's chief of operations between 1993 and 1998 before leaving to take up an executive post at the Business Development Bank. Chrétien claimed that Carle was not involved in any way with the loans to the Grand-Mère Inn, only to be countered by Joe Clark, who produced a leaked document showing that he was. After initial denials, Chrétien acknowledged having lobbied the Business Development Bank to grant a $2 million loan to Yvon Duhaime. Duhaime was a friend and constituent to whom the prime minister stated that he had sold his interest in the Grand-Mère Inn, a local Shawinigan-area hotel and golf resort, eventually providing evidence of the sale—a contract written on a cocktail napkin. Duhaime was a local businessman with an unsavoury reputation and a criminal record, who received a loan from the Business Development Bank that he was ineligible to receive because of his criminal record (Duhaime did not mention his record when applying for the loan). The bank had turned down the initial loan application, but later approved a $615,000 loan following further lobbying by Chrétien. When the bank refused to extend the loan in August 1999 on the grounds that Duhaime had a bad financial history, Beaudoin was fired by Chrétien in September 1999, which led to a wrongful dismissal suit that Beaudoin was to win in 2004. It was revealed that Chrétien had never been paid for his share in the sale of the adjoining golf course, and criminal charges were laid against Duhaime. On February 19, 2001, the RCMP announced that they had not found sufficient evidence to lay criminal charges against anyone regarding the Grand-Mère Affair, and Chrétien accused Clark of waging a "witch hunt" against the Liberals. On March 2, 2001, the federal ethics counselor Howard Wilson cleared Chrétien of wrongdoing in the Grand-Mère Affair. On April 5, 2001, the National Post received documents purportedly from an anonymous source within the bank, indicating that Chrétien was still owed $23,040 by Duhaime for his share in the Auberge Grand-Mère. The revelation of the Grand-Mère affair did not affect the outcome of the 2000 election. Chrétien and his circle believed that the breaking of the Grand-Mère story was the work of the Martin faction.

==== Sponsorship Scandal ====
The major controversy of the later Chrétien years was the Sponsorship Scandal, which involved more than $100 million distributed from the Prime Minister's Office to Quebec's federalist and Liberal Party interests without much accountability. On May 8, 2002, the Sponsorship Scandal broke when the auditor general, Sheila Fraser, issued a report accusing Public Works bureaucrats of having broken "just about every rule in the book" in awarding $1.6 million to the Montreal ad firm Groupaction Marketing Inc. The money awarded to Groupaction in three dubious contracts appeared to have disappeared, and the firm had a long history of donating to the Liberals. Opposition critics further suggested that the public works minister at the time, Alfonso Gagliano, whom Chrétien had praised as a great patriot, was not just a mere bystander to questionable contacts associated with the sponsorship program that Fraser had identified. In response to the public outrage, Chrétien argued in a speech in Winnipeg that all this was necessary to stop Quebec separatism and justified by the results, stating that: "Perhaps there was a few million dollars that might have been stolen in the process. It is possible. But how many millions of dollars have we saved the country because we have re-established the stability of Canada as a united country? If somebody has stolen the money, they will face the courts. But I will not apologize to Canadians." Chrétien's argument that he had nothing to apologize for regarding the sponsorship program, and his apparent condoning of corruption as justified by the results of saving Canada fared poorly with the Canadian public, which increasingly started to perceive the prime minister as an autocratic and aggressive leader. A poll taken later in May 2002 showed that over half of Canadians believed that the Chrétien government was corrupt. The Sponsorship Scandal would tarnish Chrétien's reputation only a few years after he left office, and contributed to the Liberals losing their majority government in 2004 and losing power altogether in 2006.

=== Chrétien and Martin: Liberal Party infighting ===
Relations between Chrétien and Martin were frequently strained, and Martin was reportedly angling to replace Chrétien as early as 1997. Martin had long hoped that Chrétien would just retire at the end of his second term, thereby allowing him to win the Liberal leadership, and was greatly disappointed in January 2000 when Chrétien's communications director, Françoise Ducros, had fired "a shot across the bow" by confirming what had been strongly hinted at since the summer of 1999 in an announcement to the caucus that Chrétien would seek a third term.

Chrétien was due to face a leadership review in February 2002, but the Liberal national executive, which was controlled by partisans of Paul Martin, agreed to Chrétien's request in early January 2001 that the leadership review be pushed back to February 2003. In agreeing to this request, Martin believed that this was the quid pro quo for allowing Chrétien a decent interval to retire with dignity sometime in 2002, an interpretation that Chrétien did not hold.

==== Rebellion and resignation ====
By early 2002, the long-simmering feud with Martin came to a head. A particular concern that had badly strained relations between the prime minister and the finance minister by early 2002 was Martin's control of the Liberal Party apparatus, especially his control over the issuing of membership forms, which he reserved largely for his own supporters. In January 2002, Brian Tobin complained to Chrétien that the Liberal Party machinery had been "captured" by Martin's followers to the extent that it was now virtually impossible for anyone else to sign up their own followers. This posed a major problem for Chrétien as the Liberals were due to hold a leadership review in February 2003. However, it was still quite possible that Chrétien would win the review by a slim margin.

In January 2002, an incident occurred which was to greatly damage Chrétien's relations with the Liberal caucus. After Chrétien reorganized the Cabinet in late January 2002, Liberal MP Carolyn Bennett criticised Chrétien at a caucus meeting for not appointing more women to the Cabinet. Chrétien exploded with rage at Bennett's criticism, saying that as a mere backbencher she did not have the right to criticise the prime minister in front of the caucus, and attacked her with such fury that Bennett collapsed in tears. In February 2002, reflecting a growing number of Liberal MPs' displeasure with Chrétien, the Liberal caucus elected the outspoken pro-Martin MP Stan Keyes (who had already openly mused in 2001 about how it was time for Chrétien to go) as their chairman, who defeated pro-Chrétien MP Steve Mahoney. Chrétien had expected Mahoney to win, and was reported to be shocked when he learned of Keyes's victory, which now gave Martin more control of the caucus.

In late May 2002, Chrétien tried to curtail Martin's campaign for the leadership of the party by instructing cabinet ministers to stop raising money for leadership bids within the Liberal Party. At what was described as a "stormy" Cabinet meeting on May 30, 2002, Chrétien stated that he intended to serve out his entire term, and ordered the end of all leadership fundraising. Martin left his cabinet on June 2, 2002. Martin claimed that Chrétien dismissed him from Cabinet, while Chrétien said that Martin had resigned. In his memoirs, Chrétien wrote that he regretted not having fired Martin a few years earlier.

Martin's departure generated a severe backlash from Martin's supporters, who controlled much of the party machinery, and all signs indicated that they were prepared to oust Chrétien at a leadership review in February 2003. To win the leadership review, Chrétien formed a team in early June 2002 comprising his close associates John Rae, David Collenette, Jean Carle and David Smith, who were ordered to sign up as many pro-Chrétien ("Chrétienist") Liberals as possible for the leadership review. The open split, which was covered extensively in the national media, increasingly painted Chrétien as a lame duck. During the summer of 2002, a number of backbencher Liberal MPs associated with Martin started to openly criticise Chrétien's leadership, calling on him to resign now or suffer the humiliation of losing the leadership review. Chrétien asked Jim Karygiannis, who had been so effective in signing up supporters for him in 1990, to repeat that performance, only to be told by Karygiannis that Chrétien had never rewarded him by appointing him to the Cabinet as he had requested many times over the years, had not even returned his phone calls to arrange a meeting to discuss his possible appointment to the Cabinet and that he was now a Martin supporter. Karygiannis then called a press conference on July 13, 2002, where he called for Chrétien to retire "with dignity", rather than risk losing a potentially divisive leadership review and avoid having his career end that way.

After less than half the caucus committed to support him in August 2002 by signing a letter indicating their support for the prime minister in the upcoming leadership review, Chrétien announced that he would not lead the party into the next election and set his resignation date for February 2004. Martin was not happy with the 2004 departure date, preferring that Chrétien retire at the end of 2002, but considered it better if Chrétien were to retire than having to defeat him at the 2003 leadership review, which would have been more divisive and would have established the ominous precedent of a prime minister being ousted by his own party for no other reason other than that someone else wanted the job. Due to mounting pressure from the Martin camp, Chrétien no longer saw his February 2004 resignation date as tenable. His final sitting in the House of Commons took place on November 6, 2003. He made an emotional farewell to the party on November 13 at the 2003 Liberal leadership convention. The following day, Martin was elected his successor. On December 12, 2003, Chrétien formally resigned as prime minister, handing power over to Martin. Chrétien joined the law firm Heenan Blaikie on January 5, 2004, as counsel. The firm announced he would work out of its Ottawa offices four days per week and make a weekly visit to the Montreal office. In early 2004, there was considerable infighting within the Liberal Party, with several Liberal MPs associated with Chrétien, such as Sheila Copps and Charles Caccia, losing their nomination battles against Martin loyalists.

== Retirement ==
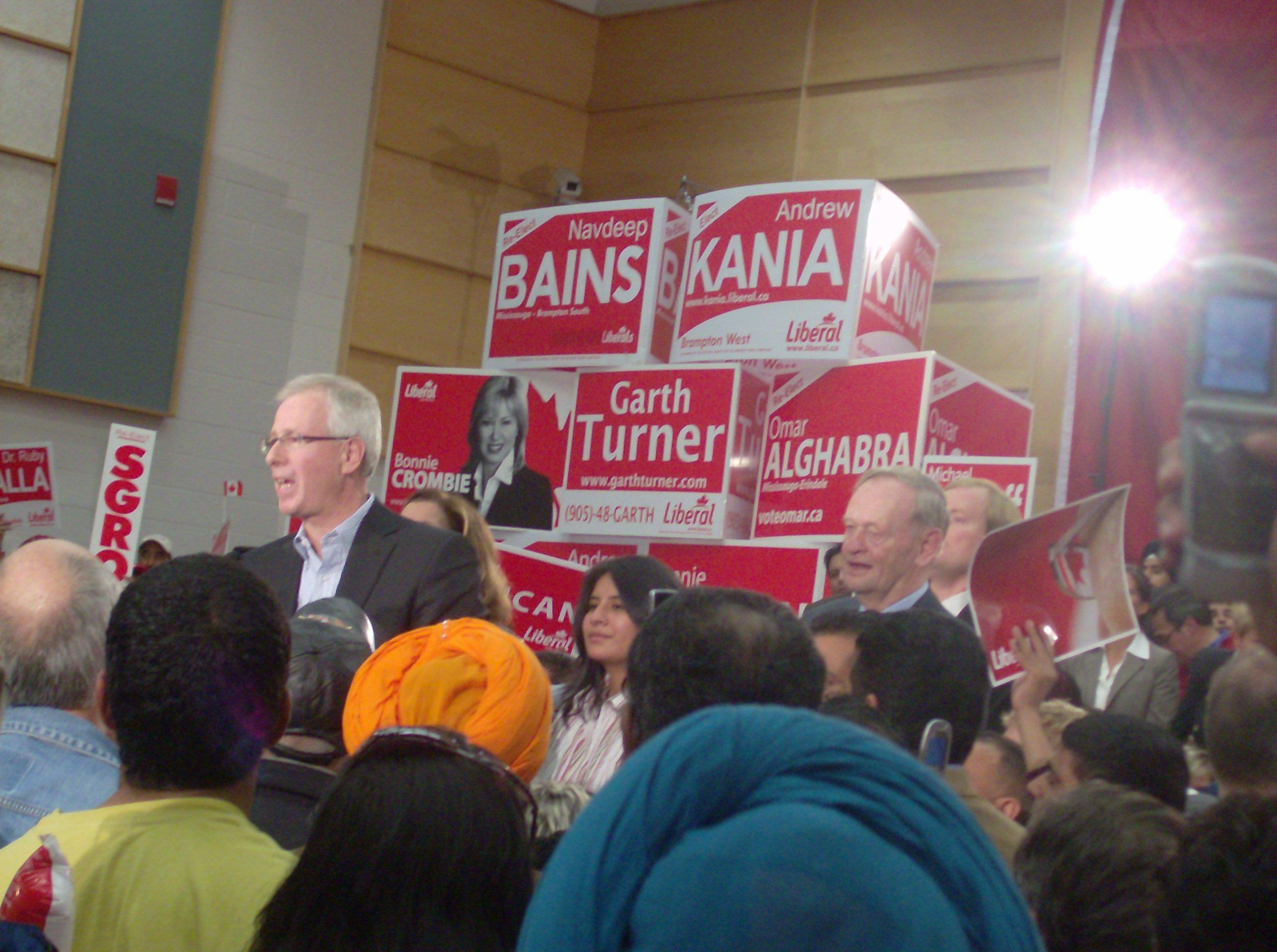
Stéphane Dion makes a speech on October 10, 2008, in Brampton West. Former Prime Minister Jean Chrétien was among notable Liberals at this rally; this was his first time campaigning for anyone since retirement.

On February 18, 2004, François Beaudoin won his wrongful dismissal suit against the Business Development Bank of Canada. Justice André Denis ruled in favour of Beaudoin's claim that he had been fired for political reasons in 1999 after trying to call in the loan to the Grand-Mère Inn. He found that Chrétien's former aide Jean Carle and Michel Vennat had made false criminal and civil allegations against Beaudoin to discredit him for suing the bank, and accused Carle of committing perjury during the trial. Citing the "unspeakable injustice" Beaudoin had suffered, Denis told the government not to appeal his ruling because doing so would waste taxpayers' money. The lingering repercussions of the sponsorship scandal of 2002 reduced the Liberal Party to a minority in the 2004 election, may have strengthened the separatist case, and contributed to the government's defeat in the 2006 election. The scandal led to long-running, deep investigations by the RCMP, a federal inquiry, the Gomery Commission, chaired by Justice John Gomery (called by Martin in 2004), and several prosecutions and convictions; the legal process continued to late 2011, more than a decade after the scandal began.

Jean Chrétien testified for the Gomery Commission regarding the sponsorship scandal in February 2005. Earlier that year, his lawyers tried but failed to have Justice John Gomery removed from the commission, arguing that he lacked objectivity. Chrétien contended that the Gomery Commission was set up to tarnish his image and was not a fair investigation. He cites comments Gomery made calling him "small town cheap", referring to the management of the sponsorship program as "catastrophically bad", and calling Chuck Guité a "charming scamp". Subsequent to the release of the first report, Chrétien decided to bring an action in Federal Court to review the commission report on the grounds that Gomery showed a "reasonable apprehension of bias", and that some conclusions did not have an "evidentiary" basis. Chrétien believed that the appointment of Bernard Roy, a former chief of staff to former PC prime minister Brian Mulroney, as chief counsel for the commission was a mistake, as he failed to call some relevant witnesses such as Don Boudria and Ralph Goodale. In his report of November 1, 2005, on responsibility for the sponsorship scandal, Justice Gomery ruled that Chrétien was not responsible for the awarding of advertising contracts in Quebec in which millions were stolen, but did accept Charles Guité's claim that he received his instructions on what program to sponsor and to spend how much money on each program from Jean Pelletier, the chief of staff at the PMO between 1993 and 2001 and Jean Carle, the director of operations at the PMO between 1993 and 1998 as the truth.

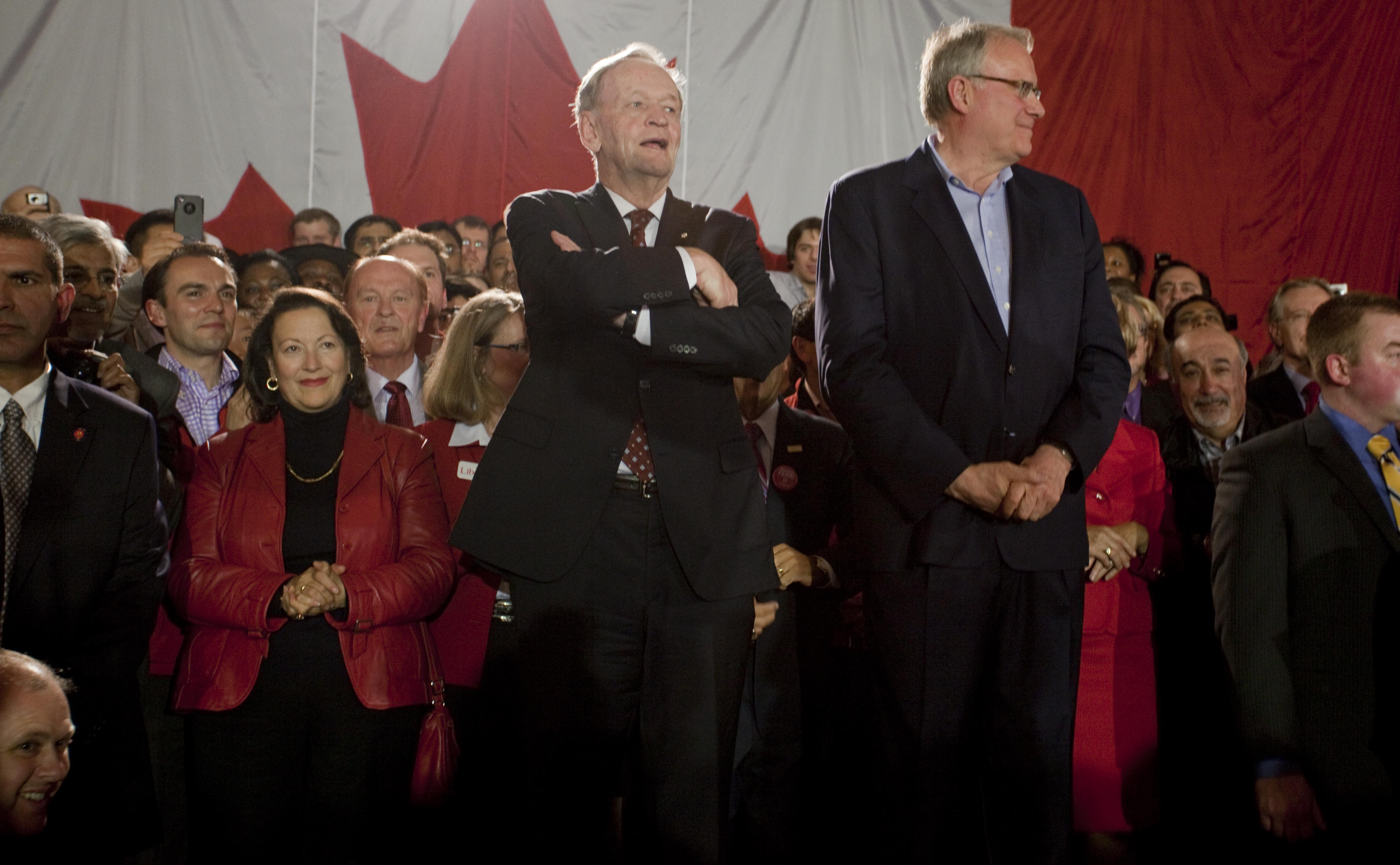
Chrétien at the Rise Up For Canada rally, 2011

In April 2007, Chrétien and Canadian book publishers Knopf Canada and Éditions du Boréal announced they would be publishing his memoirs, My Years as Prime Minister, which would recount Chrétien's tenure as prime minister. The book was announced under the title of A Passion for Politics. It arrived in bookstores in October 2007, in both English and French, but the promotional tour was delayed due to heart surgery. As well, Straight from the Heart was republished with a new preface and two additional chapters detailing his return to politics as the leader of the Liberal Party and his victory in the election of 1993. Publisher Key Porter Books timed the reissue to coincide with the publication of My Years as Prime Minister.

On October 1, 2007, Chrétien was playing at the Royal Montreal Golf Club, north of Montreal, at a charity golf event. Playing alongside a cardiologist, he mentioned his discomfort, saying he "had been suffering some symptoms for some time" and the doctor advised him to come in for a checkup. After examination, Chrétien was hospitalized at the Montreal Heart Institute, with unstable angina, a sign that a heart attack might be imminent. He underwent quadruple heart bypass surgery as a result on the morning of October 3, 2007. The operation forced Chrétien to delay a promotional tour for his book. He was "expected to have a full and complete recovery".

In November 2008, Chrétien and former NDP leader Ed Broadbent came out of retirement to negotiate a formal coalition agreement between the Liberals, the New Democratic Party and the Bloc Québécois, the first power-sharing coalition since the Union government of 1917–1918 founded in response to the conscription crisis caused by World War I, in a bid to form a new government to replace the government of Prime Minister Stephen Harper. Harper's request to prorogue parliament was granted by Governor General Michaëlle Jean, staving off the opposition's scheduled motion of non-confidence.

On August 5, 2010, Chrétien complained of experiencing difficulty walking, and was admitted to a hospital. A brain scan was conducted the next day, and it revealed that a 3-centimetre-wide subdural hematoma was pushing 1.5 centimetres into his brain. Emergency surgery was then performed that afternoon, and the blood was successfully drained. He was released from hospital on August 9, 2010. Doctors, who were impressed with the speed of his recovery, ordered him to rest for two to four weeks.

Chrétien's name was rumoured as a replacement for Kofi Annan as secretary-general of the United Nations.

Chrétien is a member of the Fondation Chirac's honour committee, since the foundation was launched in 2008 by former French president Jacques Chirac in order to promote world peace. He is also a member of the Club de Madrid, a group of former leaders from democratic countries that works to strengthen democracy and respond to global crises. Jean Chrétien is also an honorary member of the International Raoul Wallenberg Foundation.

Chrétien is named in the Paradise Papers, a set of confidential electronic documents relating to offshore investment that were leaked to the German newspaper Süddeutsche Zeitung.

Chrétien was appointed a Companion of the Order of Canada on June 29, 2007. He was appointed to the Order of Merit by Queen Elizabeth II in July 2009 and received the insignia of the order from the Queen on October 20, 2009.

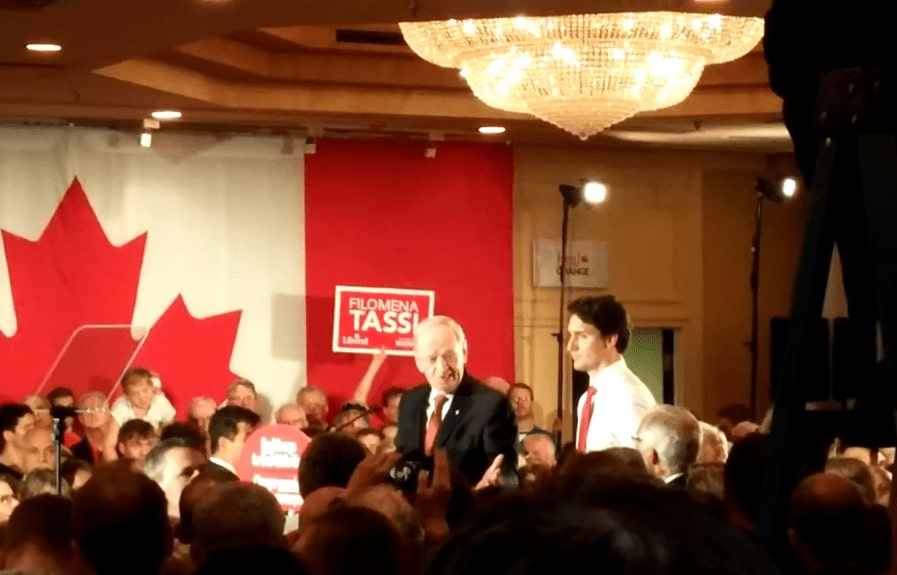
Chrétien at a rally in support of Justin Trudeau, 2015

In December 2011, Chrétien claimed that the Conservative Party and its majority government would overturn the legalization of same-sex marriage and abortion. In March 2013, Chrétien criticized Stephen Harper's foreign policy, sparking some debate about the different degrees of influence Canada has held in foreign affairs under the two prime ministers. On September 12, 2015, Chrétien published an open letter to Canadian voters in multiple newspapers in which he criticized Harper's response to the European migrant crisis, stating that Harper has turned Canada into a "cold hearted" nation and he has "shamed Canada". "I am sad to see that in fewer than 10 years, the Harper government has tarnished almost 60 years of Canada's reputation as a builder of peace and progress", Chrétien stated before imploring voters to topple the Harper government in the upcoming election.

In October 2021, Chrétien faced controversy during a press interview promoting his recent book in which he denied having knowledge of the abuse of Indigenous children in residential schools during his time as Indian Affairs Minister. He went on to compare the experience of Indian residential schools, which inflicted lifelong psychological and physical trauma and led either directly or indirectly to the deaths of thousands of children who attended the schools, to his own experience at a private boarding school. NDP MP Charlie Angus contested that the residential school abuse was reported to the department while Chrétien was minister, citing a letter from a teacher at St. Anne's Residential School in Fort Albany, Ont. It was dated 1968. In it, the teacher told him "that crimes are being committed against children," and "that he as Indian affairs minister had to step up and do something." Chrétien never responded.

In September 2022, Chrétien attended Elizabeth II's state funeral, along with other former Canadian prime ministers.

Chrétien was expected to attend King Charles III's historic speech from the throne in the Senate of Canada on May 27, 2025. (Note: This occurred while Charles III was visiting Canada. The speech officially opened the country's 45th session of Parliament.) However, Chrétien was unable to attend because he was recovering from heart surgery.

== Legacy ==
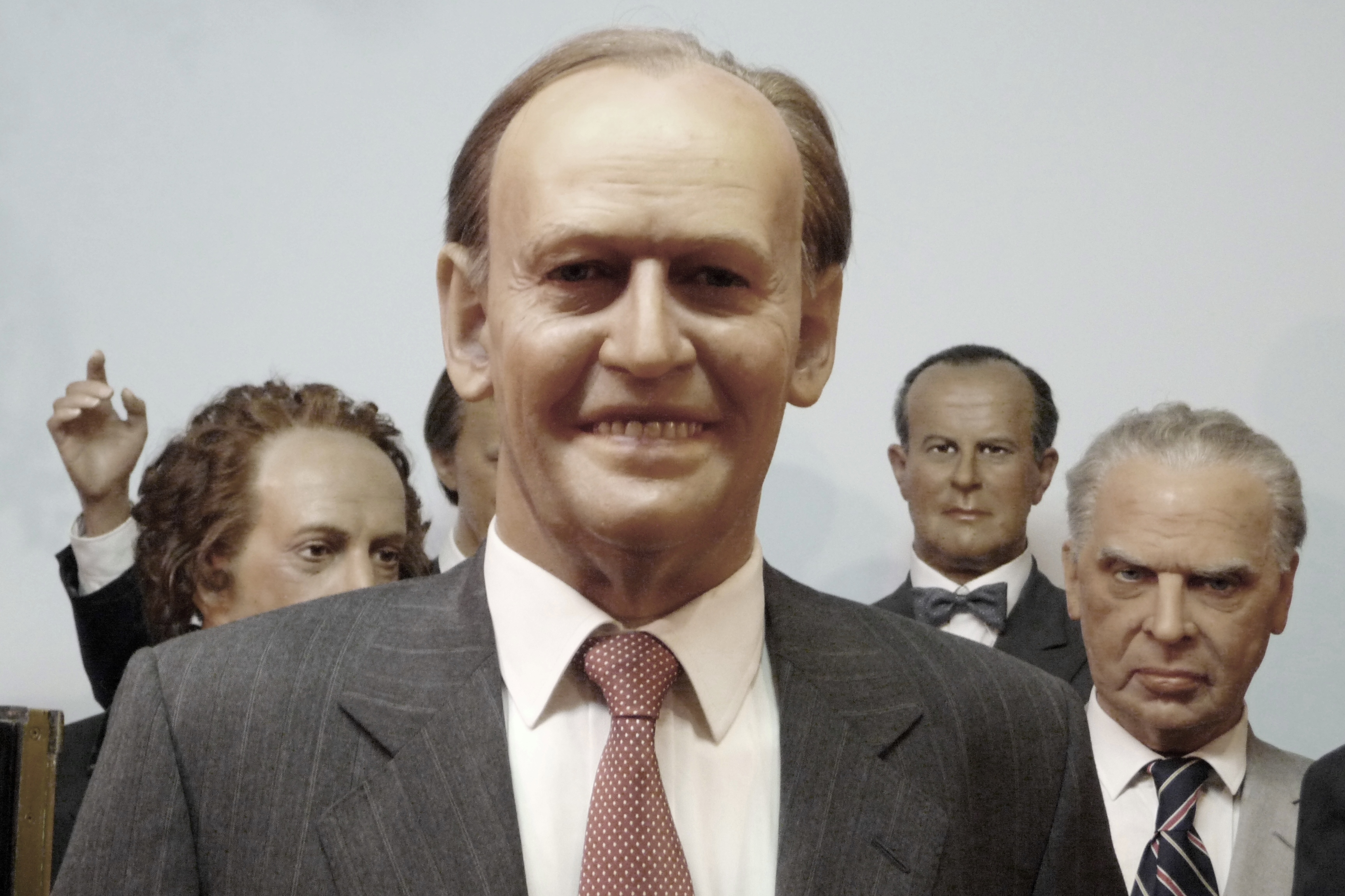
Wax figure of Chrétien at the Royal London Wax Museum

Chrétien was ranked the ninth-greatest prime minister in a survey of Canadian scholars in 1999, which appeared in Prime Ministers: Ranking Canada's Leaders by J.L. Granatstein and Norman Hillmer. Maclean's has consistently ranked Chrétien in the top ten in its assessments of Canadian prime ministers; he was ranked ninth in 1997, sixth in 2011 and seventh in 2016.

Writing in Policy Options, historian and author Bob Plamondon pointed out that "After demonizing Chrétien, Quebec nationalists could not reconcile themselves to the reality that he gave their province new tools to protect the French language and culture. Canada had not been as united in the previous 50 years as when Chrétien left office. Economists were left to wonder how Chrétien turned around the national finances without triggering a recession. Canadians said in a survey that staying out of Iraq was the country's greatest foreign policy achievement. University presidents still marvel at how Chrétien rebuilt Canada's intellectual infrastructure, turning a brain drain into a brain gain."

The conservative historian Michael Bliss wrote that Chrétien was "moderately competent and only moderately corrupt." Bliss also wrote, "Jean Chrétien's career shows how much can be accomplished in Canadian politics by someone who is ambitious, hard-working, and has good luck — even if they speak English with a very thick accent."

== Supreme Court appointments ==
Chrétien chose the following jurists to be appointed as justices of the Supreme Court of Canada:

- Michel Bastarache (September 30, 1997 – June 30, 2008)
- William Ian Corneil Binnie (January 8, 1998 – October 21, 2011)
- Louise Arbour (September 15, 1999 – June 30, 2004)
- Louis LeBel (January 7, 2000 – November 30, 2014)
- Beverley McLachlin (as chief justice, July 7, 2000 – December 15, 2017; appointed a puisne justice under Prime Minister Mulroney, March 30, 1989)
- Marie Deschamps (August 7, 2002 – August 7, 2012)
- Morris J. Fish (August 5, 2003 – August 31, 2013)

== Honours ==
| Ribbon | Description | Notes |
| | Order of Merit (O.M.) | July 13, 2009 |
| | Companion of the Order of Canada (C.C.) | Awarded on May 3, 2007; Invested on February 22, 2008 |
| | Centennial Anniversary of the Confederation of Canada Medal | 1967; As a minister of the Crown and an elected member of the House of Commons of Canada, Jean Chrétien would be awarded the medal as a member of the Canadian order of precedence. |
| | Queen Elizabeth II Silver Jubilee Medal for Canada | 1977; As a minister of the Crown and an elected member of the House of Commons of Canada, Jean Chrétien would be awarded the medal as a member of the Canadian order of precedence. |
| | 125th Anniversary of the Confederation of Canada Medal | 1993; As the Leader of Her Majesty's Loyal Opposition and an elected member of the House of Commons of Canada, Jean Chrétien would be awarded the medal as a member of the Canadian order of precedence. |
| | Queen Elizabeth II Golden Jubilee Medal for Canada | 2002; As the prime minister of Canada and an elected member of the House of Commons of Canada, the Right Honourable Jean Chrétien would be awarded the medal as a member of the Canadian order of precedence. |
| | Queen Elizabeth II Diamond Jubilee Medal for Canada | 2012; As a former prime minister of Canada and having been awarded with the Order of Canada, Jean Chrétien was awarded the medal as a member of the Canadian order of precedence. |
| | King Charles III Coronation Medal for Canada | 2025; Nominated by Mona Fortier, MP for Ottawa-Vanier-Gloucester. |
| | Order of Friendship from the Russian Federation | 2014 |
| | Grand Cordon of the Order of the Rising Sun from the Japanese government | 2023 |

Coat of arms of Jean Chrétien
| Crest Issuant from flames Or a phoenix wings elevated and addorsed Azure beaked and crested Gules holding in its beak an open scroll proper; Escutcheon Gules a beehive Or with three bees Argent embellished Sable, in the canton the mark of the Prime Ministership of Canada (four maple leaves conjoined in cross) Argent; Supporters Two polar bears proper each charged on the shoulder with a Latin cross pendent from each crossbeam two balance pans Gules, standing on a rocky mount proper set with maple leaves Gules and fleurs-de-lis Azure and issuant from barry-wavy Argent and Azure; Motto LABORARE AD AEDIFICANDUM (Work To Build) |

=== Honorary degrees ===
| Location | Date | School | Degree |
|---|---|---|---|
| Ontario | 1981 | Wilfrid Laurier University | Doctor of Laws (LL.D.) |
| Ontario | 1982 | Laurentian University | Doctor of Laws (LL.D.) |
| Ontario | 1986 | York University | Doctor of Laws (LL.D.) |
| Alberta | 1987 | University of Alberta | Doctor of Laws (LL.D.) |
| Ontario | 1988 | Lakehead University | Doctor of Laws (LL.D.) |
| Ontario | 1994 | University of Ottawa | Doctor of the University (D.Univ.) |
| New Brunswick | 1994 | University of Moncton | |
| Japan | 1996 | Meiji University | Doctorate |
| Poland | 1999 | Warsaw School of Economics | Doctorate |
| Michigan | 1999 | Michigan State University | Doctor of Laws (LL.D.) |
| Israel | 2000 | Hebrew University of Jerusalem | |
| Newfoundland and Labrador | 2000 | Memorial University of Newfoundland | Doctor of Laws (LL.D.) |
| Dominican Republic | 2003 | Pontificia Universidad Católica Madre y Maestra | |
| Ontario | 2004 | Queen's University | Doctor of Laws (LL.D.) |
| Ontario | 2005 | McMaster University | Doctor of Laws (LL.D.) |
| Ukraine | 2007 | National University of Kyiv-Mohyla Academy | |
| Ontario | October 23, 2008 | University of Western Ontario | Doctor of Laws (LL.D.) |
| Quebec | 2008 | Université du Québec à Trois-Rivières | |
| Quebec | June 2010 | Concordia University | Doctor of Laws (LL.D.) |
| Quebec | 2011 | Université de Montréal | |
| Manitoba | June 12, 2014 | University of Winnipeg | Doctor of Laws (LL.D.) |
| Ontario | 2022 | Carleton University | Doctor of Laws (LL.D.) |

== See also ==
- Bibliography of Jean Chrétien
- List of prime ministers of Canada

== Notes ==
Parliament of Canada
| Preceded by Herb Gray | Leader of the Official Opposition; 1990–1993 | Succeeded by Lucien Bouchard |
| Preceded by | Deputy Leader of the Official Opposition; 1984–1986 | Succeeded by |
| Preceded by Gérard Lamy | Member for Saint-Maurice—Laflèche; 1963–1968 | District abolished |
| New district | Member for Saint-Maurice; 1968–1986 | Succeeded by Gilles Grondin |
| Preceded by Fernand Robichaud | Member for Beauséjour; 1990–1993 | Succeeded by Fernand Robichaud |
| Preceded by Denis Pronovost | Member for Saint-Maurice; 1993–2003 | District abolished |
Party political offices
| Preceded by John Turner | Leader of the Liberal Party; 1990–2003 | Succeeded by Paul Martin |
| Preceded by Allan MacEachen | Deputy Leader of the Liberal Party; 1984–1986 | Succeeded by |
26th Canadian Ministry (1993–2003) – Cabinet of Jean Chrétien
Cabinet post (1)
| Predecessor | Office | Successor |
| Kim Campbell | Prime Minister of Canada; 1993–2003 | Paul Martin |
23rd Canadian Ministry (1984) – Cabinet of John Turner
Cabinet posts (2)
| Predecessor | Office | Successor |
| Allan MacEachen | Deputy Prime Minister of Canada; 1984 | Erik Nielsen |
| Allan MacEachen | Secretary of State for External Affairs; 1984 | Joe Clark |
22nd Canadian Ministry (1980–1984) – Second cabinet of Pierre Trudeau
Cabinet posts (2)
| Predecessor | Office | Successor |
| Marc Lalonde | Minister of Energy, Mines and Resources; 1982–1984 | Gerald Regan |
| Jacques Flynn | Minister of Justice; 1980–1982 | Mark MacGuigan |
20th Canadian Ministry (1968–1979) – First cabinet of Pierre Trudeau
Cabinet posts (5)
| Predecessor | Office | Successor |
| Donald Stovel Macdonald | Minister of Finance; 1977–1979 | John Crosbie |
| Don Jamieson | Minister of Industry, Trade and Commerce; 1976–1977 | Jack Horner |
| Charles Drury | President of the Treasury Board; 1974–1976 | Bob Andras |
| Arthur Laing | Minister of Indian Affairs and Northern Development; 1968–1974 | Judd Buchanan |
| cont'd from 19th Min. | Minister of National Revenue; 1968 | Jean-Pierre Côté |
19th Canadian Ministry (1963–1968) – Cabinet of Lester B. Pearson
Cabinet posts (2)
| Predecessor | Office | Successor |
| Edgar Benson | Minister of National Revenue; 1968 | cont'd into 20th Min. |
| | Minister without Portfolio; 1967–1968 | |
Political offices
| Preceded by Silvio Berlusconi | Chairperson of the G7; 1995 | Succeeded by Jacques Chirac |
| Preceded by Fidel Ramos | Chairperson of APEC; 1997 | Succeeded by Mahathir Mohamad |
| Preceded by Silvio Berlusconi | Chairperson of the G8; 2002 | Succeeded by Jacques Chirac |
Order of precedence
| Preceded by Kim Campbell | Canadian order of precedence as of 2010 | Succeeded by Paul Martin |
