= Shawinigate =

1990s Canadian political scandal

Shawinigate was a 1990s Canadian political scandal in which Prime Minister Jean Chrétien was accused of profiting from real estate deals and government policies in his hometown of Shawinigan, Quebec.

== The scandal ==
In 1988, prior to becoming prime minister, Chrétien and two business partners had purchased the $625,000 Grand-Mère Golf Course and Auberge Grand-Mère Hotel. In 1993, six months before he became prime minister, Chrétien and his partners agreed to sell the hotel to Yvon Duhaime, a personal friend of Chrétien.

A month after becoming prime minister, Chrétien agreed to sell his personal shares in the golf course to Toronto tycoon Jonas Prince. However, by January 1996, Chrétien was still the formal owner of the golf course since Prince had never paid for the shares. He reported this fact to the Federal Ethics Counsellor, Howard Wilson.

Meanwhile, new hotel owner Yvon Duhaime applied to the Business Development Bank of Canada for a $2,000,000 loan to expand the hotel. Chrétien took a personal interest in the transaction, and both phoned and met with the bank's director, but to no avail – Duhaime's application was declined.

In early 1997, Chrétien began asking the bank if it would be possible to extend a smaller loan to expand the hotel. The bank agreed to loan Duhaime $615,000 and the Federal Human Resources Department awarded Duhaime an additional $164,000 grant.

== The scandal comes to light ==
The scandal came to light slowly, with information only being released by the governing Liberal Party after a series of newspaper reports and after persistent questioning by members of the Opposition in the House of Commons of Canada, and a formal lawsuit.

In 1999, Ethics Commissioner Wilson ruled that Chrétien had not violated any ethical boundaries when the hotel was awarded federal grant money although he later admitted that he was unaware Chrétien had taken such a personal interest by meeting with the bank president in an effort to secure the $615,000 loan.

While Chrétien faced harsh criticism from all opposition parties, Stockwell Day, then-leader of the Canadian Alliance, denounced him calling him a "criminal", while Joe Clark continued an investigation accusing Chrétien of abusing power, and demanded that he resign as prime minister until a public inquiry could be held.

== Litigation ==
In September 2003, the former president of the bank that had initially declined the loan won his wrongful dismissal claim, and it was ruled that he was fired because he had suggested that it was time to collect on the $615,000 loan in 1999.

In early March 2008, Ontario's top court ordered the National Post, a major Canadian newspaper, to hand over documents in the "Shawinigate" allegations, saying the need to enforce the law should outweigh the need to protect anonymous sources. In May 2010, the National Post lost its appeal, with the Supreme Court of Canada reinstating the search warrant despite the newspaper's claims of journalist-source privilege under Section Two of the Canadian Charter of Rights and Freedoms.
