= 1990 Liberal Party of Canada leadership election =

Party election in Canada

- June 23, 1990
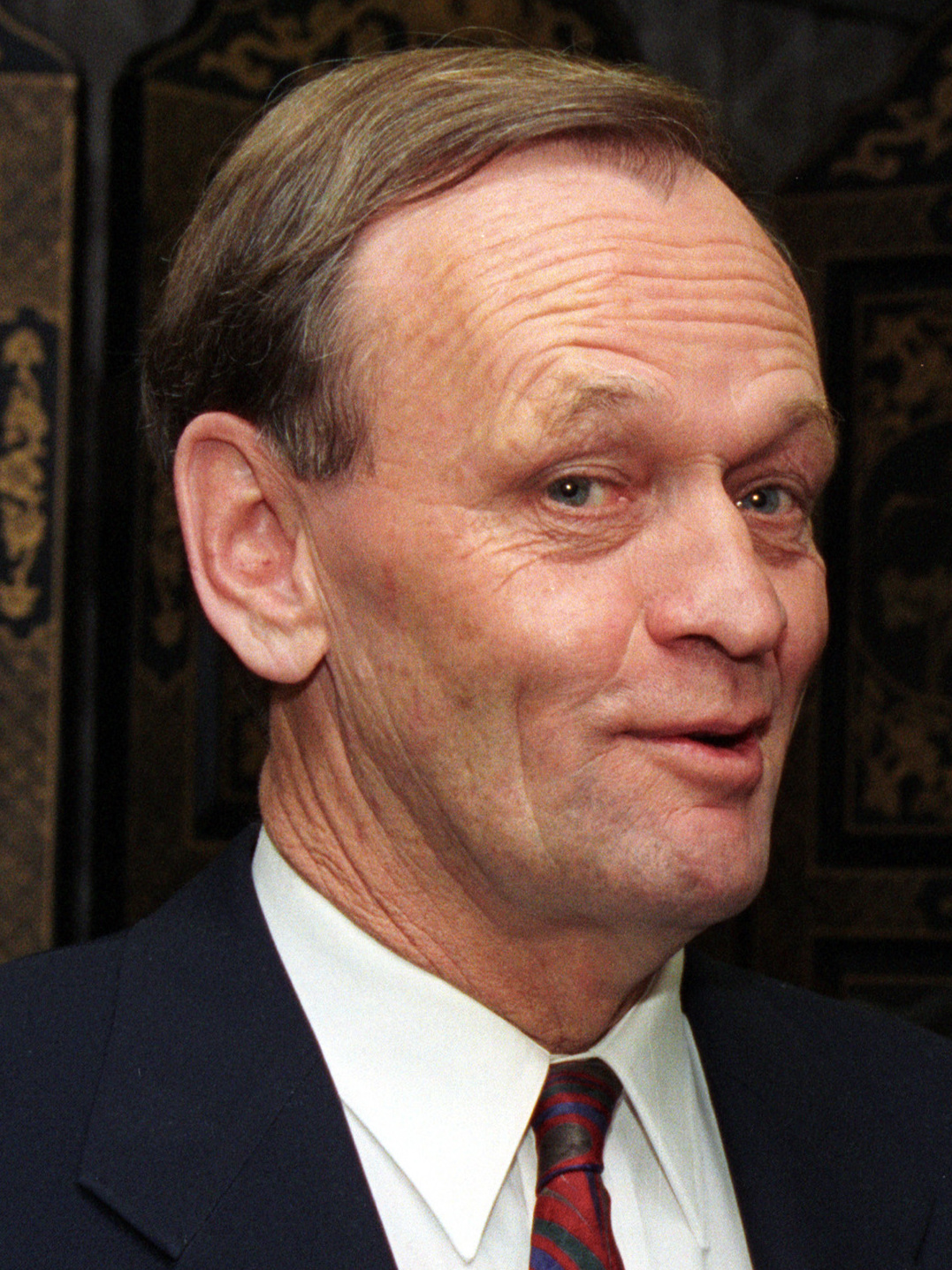

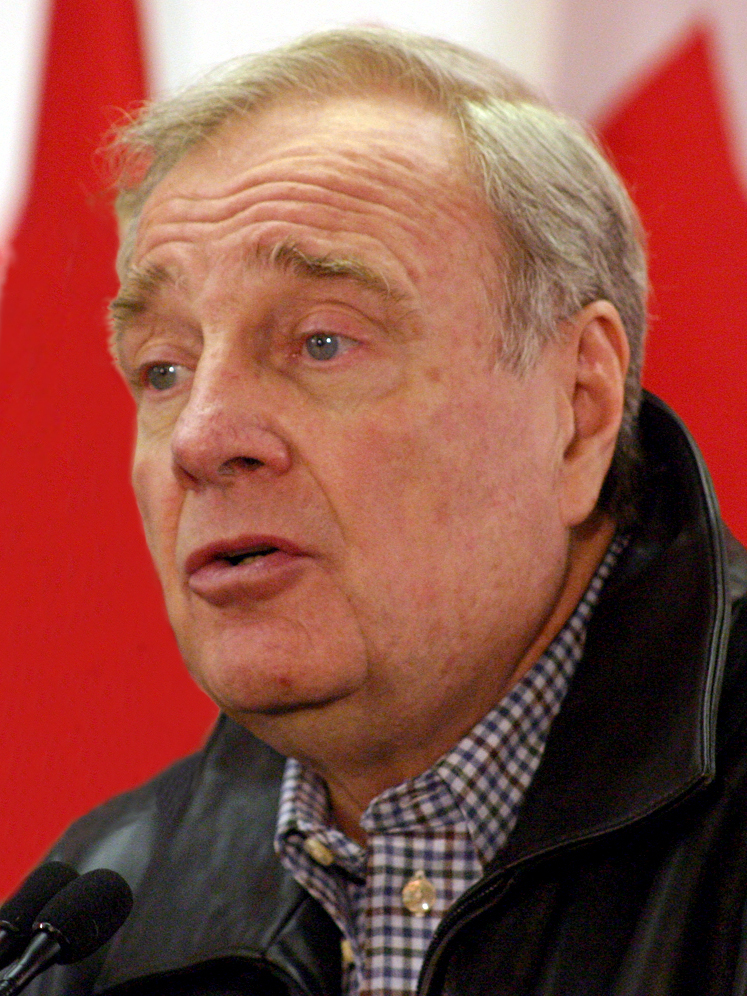

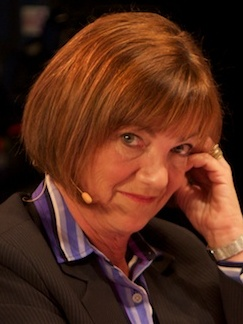

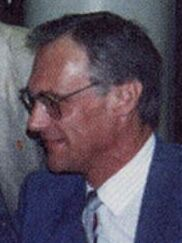
Candidate	Jean Chrétien	Paul Martin
Delegate count	2,652	1,176
Percentage	56.8%	25.19%
Candidate	Sheila Copps	Tom Wappel
Delegate count	499	267
Percentage	10.69%	5.72%
Leader before election
John Turner
Elected Leader
Jean Chrétien

1990 Liberal leadership election
- Date: June 23, 1990
- Convention: Olympic Saddledome, Calgary, Alberta
- Resigning leader: John Turner
- Won by: Jean Chrétien
- Ballots: 1
- Candidates: 5

The Liberal Party of Canada held a leadership election on June 23, 1990 at the Olympic Saddledome in Calgary, Alberta. The party chose former Deputy Prime Minister Jean Chrétien as its new leader, replacing the outgoing leader, former Prime Minister John Turner.

== Background ==
The 1988 Canadian federal election had seen the Liberals recover somewhat from their nadir in 1984, but the ruling Progressive Conservatives were still returned with a strong majority, with the Liberals finishing behind the Tories or New Democratic Party in seat counts everywhere except for Atlantic Canada and the Northwest Territories. While the Liberals had led the polls for much of the campaign, their lead ultimately faltered after the Tories relentlessly attacked Turner's personal credibility in the closing weeks.

In May 1989, with the Liberals still only about level with the Tories in the polls despite the increasing unpopularity of Brian Mulroney's government, and remaining far behind in their former stronghold of Quebec (where they had lost even further ground at the previous year's election, despite otherwise improving their vote share across the country), Turner announced his intention to stand down as party leader the following year, once a new leadership election had taken place. He initially refused calls (mostly from Chrétien supporters) to resign immediately and hand over to an interim leader, citing the ongoing national debate over the Meech Lake Accord, but as a compromise he agreed to give up his position as opposition leader in February 1990, with Herb Gray taking over and assuming many of the duties of party leader despite Turner legally remaining in the role.

== Candidates ==
=== Sheila Copps ===
Sheila Copps, 37, Member of Parliament for Hamilton East since 1984 and was the Opposition Critic for the Environment and Social Policy. She had been a Member of Provincial Parliament in Ontario from 1981 to 1984 before entering federal politics and had run for the leadership of the Ontario Liberal Party, placing second.

=== Jean Chrétien ===
Jean Chrétien, 56, had placed second to Turner at the 1984 Liberal leadership convention. He had been MP for Saint-Maurice, Quebec from 1963 until 1986 and had served as a junior cabinet minister under Lester Pearson and had several senior portfolios under Pierre Trudeau including Industry Minister, Finance Minister, Energy Minister, and Justice Minister and was the minister responsible for constitutional negotiations from 1980 to 1982 when the Constitution of Canada was patriated and the Canadian Charter of Rights and Freedoms negotiated and ratified. He served as Minister of External Affairs and Deputy Prime Minister under Turner's short-lived government.

=== Paul Martin ===
Paul Martin, 51, MP for LaSalle—Émard, Quebec since 1988 and was the Opposition Critic for Treasury Board, Housing, and Urban Affairs; former president and CEO of Canada Steamship Lines.

=== John Nunziata ===
John Nunziata, 35, MP for York South—Weston, Toronto, since 1984, and was Opposition Critic for the Solicitor General.

=== Tom Wappel ===
Tom Wappel, 40, MP for Scarborough West since 1988, was the Associate Opposition Critic for Immigration. An anti-abortion campaigner, he was supported by the Campaign Life Coalition.

== Withdrew ==
- Clifford Lincoln, 61, had been Quebec Minister of the Environment in the provincial Liberal government of Robert Bourassa until resigning due to a dispute over language policy. He announced his candidacy for the federal Liberal leadership but withdrew after he was defeated in his attempt to win a seat in the House of Commons in the February 12, 1990 Chambly by-election.

== Declined to run ==
- Lloyd Axworthy, 50, MP for Winnipeg South Centre (and previously Winnipeg—Fort Garry) since 1979. He had previously served as the Minister of Transport under Trudeau and then Turner. Though he was believed to have some support in the western provinces as one of only six Liberal MPs elected west of Ontario in 1988 (and, along with Turner, one of only two elected to a Western Canada seat in 1984), he declined to put himself forward as a candidate and ultimately supported Chrétien.
- Herb Gray, 59, MP for Windsor West since 1968. He ultimately decided against running, but served as the party's parliamentary leader from February until December 1990, when Chrétien won the Beauséjour by-election and returned to parliament.

== Endorsements ==
Jean Chrétien
- MPs: (35) Jack Anawak, Mark Assad, Lloyd Axworthy, George Baker, Réginald Bélair, David Berger, Charles Caccia, Coline Campbell, Rex Crawford, David Dingwall, Maurice Dionne, Ronald Duhamel, Sheila Finestone, Maurice Foster, Beryl Gaffney, Alfonso Gagliano, Mac Harb, Bob Kaplan, Jim Karygiannis, Derek Lee, Lawrence MacAulay, Roy MacLaren, Shirley Maheu, Sergio Marchi, Peter Milliken, Dennis Mills, Rey Pagtakhan, Gilbert Parent, George Proud, Fernand Robichaud, Bill Rompkey, Roger Simmons, Brian Tobin, Lyle Vanclief, Bob Wood
- Senators: (3) Keith Davey, Leo Kolber, Pietro Rizzuto
Paul Martin
- MPs: (7) Maurizio Bevilacqua, Jesse Flis, Albina Guarnieri, Jean Lapierre, Jim Peterson, Gilles Rocheleau, Joe Volpe

(Sources used: "30 MPs endorse Chrétien", Toronto Star, 24 January 1990; Shelley Page, "Liberal MPs jockey for favor with new boss over leadership", Toronto Star, 22 May 1990; Geoff Pounsett, "Missing Meech deadline won't kill Canada: Chrétien", Kingston Whig-Standard, 28 May 1990, p. 2; Ross Howard, "Liberal candidates fight over Meech Chrétien scolded by Martin, Copps ", Globe and Mail, 21 June 1990, A1; David Vienneau, "Martin says he'll run again", Toronto Star, 25 June 1990.)

== Results ==
First Ballot
Candidate	Delegate Count	%
Jean Chrétien	2,652	56.81%
Paul Martin	1,176	25.19%
Sheila Copps	499	10.69%
Tom Wappel	267	5.72%
John Nunziata	64	1.37%
Spoiled ballots	10	0.21%
Total votes cast	4,668	100%

First ballot
Chrétien	56.81%
Martin	25.19%
Copps	10.69%
Wappel	5.72%
Nunziata	1.37%
Spoilt ballots	0.21%
