= James Bartleman =

Canadian diplomat (1939–2023)

The Honourable James Bartleman OC OOnt
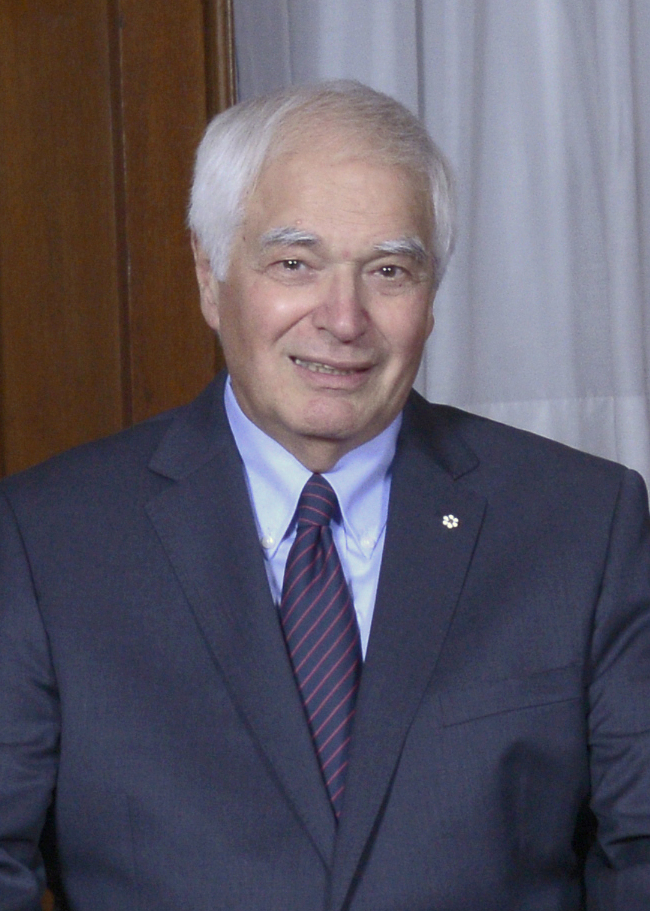
- Bartleman in 2014

27th Lieutenant Governor of Ontario
- In office 7 March 2002 – 5 September 2007
- Monarch: Elizabeth II
- Governors General: Adrienne Clarkson; Michaëlle Jean
- Premier: Mike Harris; Ernie Eves; Dalton McGuinty
- Preceded by: Hilary Weston
- Succeeded by: David Onley

Canadian Ambassador to the European Union
- In office 26 July 2000 – 7 March 2002
- Prime Minister: Jean Chrétien
- Preceded by: Jean-Pierre Juneau
- Succeeded by: Jeremy Kinsman

Permanent Representative of Canada to the North Atlantic Treaty Organization
- In office 1990–1994
- Prime Minister: Brian Mulroney; Jean Chrétien
- Preceded by: Gordon Scott Smith
- Succeeded by: John R. Anderson

Personal details
- Born: James Karl Bartleman; 24 December 1939 Orillia, Ontario, Canada
- Died: 14 August 2023 (aged 83) London, Ontario, Canada
- Spouse: Marie-Jeanne Rosillon (m. 1975)
- Children: 3
- Education: University of Western Ontario (BA, 1963)

James Karl Bartleman (24 December 1939 – 14 August 2023) was a Canadian diplomat and author who served as the 27th Lieutenant Governor of Ontario from 2002 to 2007.

Bartleman was a son of Percy Scott Bartleman and Maureen Florence Bartleman (Simcoe). He grew up in the Muskoka town of Port Carling, and he was a member of the Chippewas of Mnjikaning First Nation. In 1963, he earned a Bachelor of Arts degree (BA) in History from the University of Western Ontario, where he was initiated as a member of Phi Delta Theta.

From 2007 to 2012, Bartleman was the Chancellor of the Ontario College of Art and Design (OCAD) in Toronto.

== Foreign service career ==
Prior to taking on the role of lieutenant governor, Bartleman had a distinguished career of more than 35 years in the Canadian foreign service. In 1967, he began his diplomatic career in what was then known as the Department of External Affairs (now Global Affairs Canada). Following an assignment in Bogota, Colombia, Bartleman was given the task in 1972 of opening Canada's first diplomatic mission in the newly independent People's Republic of Bangladesh. Bartleman later served in a diplomatic posting in Brussels. At External Affairs, Bartleman headed the Commonwealth Caribbean Division for several years. He was then made Canada's ambassador to Cuba (Havana) from 1981 to 1983. Upon his return from Cuba, he was appointed director general of security and intelligence for the Department of External Affairs. In 1986, Bartleman was appointed Canada's Ambassador to Israel (Tel Aviv), while also serving as non-resident High Commissioner to Cyprus. In 1990, Bartleman was named Canadian Ambassador to the North Atlantic Council of the North Atlantic Treaty Organization (NATO) in Brussels, Belgium. In 1994, Bartleman returned to Ottawa, where he served in the Privy Council Office as foreign policy advisor to Prime Minister Chretien. In 1998, Bartleman became Canada's High Commissioner to the Republic of South Africa (Pretoria). In February 1999, while in Cape Town to attend the opening of Parliament, Bartleman was attacked and robbed by an assailant. Later that year, he was reassigned to Australia (Canberra), where Bartleman served as High Commissioner. In 2000, Bartleman was named ambassador to the European Union in Brussels.

Bartleman was director of security and intelligence for the Department of External Affairs at the time of the 1985 Air India Bombing. On 3 May 2007, he testified at the Air India Inquiry that he had presented an intelligence document to the RCMP warning of a possible attack days prior to the bombing. Bob Rae, who had been tasked with advising deputy PM Anne McLellan, later admitted that he never bothered to interview Bartleman, the former head of intelligence for Foreign Affairs Canada.

== Lieutenant Governor of Ontario ==
Bartleman was sworn in as the 27th Lieutenant Governor of Ontario on 7 March 2002. He was Ontario's 41st Vice-regal representative (27th since confederation, 41st since the establishment of the post in 1792).

As is traditional to a vice-regal appointment, Bartleman used his position to spearhead three initiatives that he personally identified with and considered important. During his mandate as Lieutenant Governor, he sought to:

1. Reduce the stigma of mental illness;
2. Fight racism and discrimination;
3. Promote literacy among First Nations children.

To these ends, he initiated the Lieutenant Governor's Book Program in 2004. He has collected over 1.2 million books, donated from all corners of the province from both institutions and individuals, to stock school libraries in First Nations communities, particularly in Northern Ontario. In 2005, to further promote literacy and bridge building, Bartleman initiated a program to pair up Native and non-Native schools in Ontario and Nunavut, and set-up summer camps for literacy development in five northern First Nations communities.

== Personal life and death ==
Bartleman was related to honorary Chief of the Mnjikaning Indians John Bigwin, on his mother's side.

James Bartleman died at a hospice in London, Ontario on 14 August 2023, at the age of 83.

Unlike most vice-regal funerals, which are public, Bartleman's funeral was private but flags flew at half mast.

== Writing ==
Bartleman published several works of non-fiction, both before and during his viceregal term. These included the childhood memoirs Out of Muskoka (2002) and Raisin Wine: A Boyhood in a Different Muskoka (2007), and the professional career memoirs On Six Continents (2004) and Rollercoaster: My Hectic Years as Jean Chrétien's Diplomatic Advisor (2005).

Following the end of his viceregal term, Bartleman has also published a trilogy of social justice novels, As Long as the Rivers Flow (2011), The Redemption of Oscar Wolf (2013) and Exceptional Circumstances (2015). As Long as the Rivers Flow was a finalist for the 2013 Burt Award for First Nations, Métis and Inuit Literature.

== Honours ==
=== Orders and awards ===
- Bartleman was awarded the National Aboriginal Achievement Award (now the Indspire Award) for public service in 1999
- On 1 June 2002, as Lieutenant-Governor, he received the Order of Ontario and became the Order's Chancellor
- On 1 June 2002, he was invested as a Knight of Justice in the Order of St. John
- In 2002, he received the Canadian version of the Queen Elizabeth II Golden Jubilee Medal
- On 25 January 2008, he received the Rotary Youth Impact Award for Lifetime Achievement from the Rotary Club of Toronto West
- In 2011, he was made an Officer of the Order of Canada "for his contributions to his country, notably as lieutenant governor, and as a champion of mental health, literacy and poverty reduction."
- In 2012, he received the Canadian version of the Queen Elizabeth II Diamond Jubilee Medal
- The Dr. Hugh Lefave Award
- The Courage to Come Back Award
- The Deloitte Hero Inspiration Award
- The Jane Chamberlin Award for his efforts to reduce the stigma of mental illness
- The Phi Delta Kappa Educator of the Year Award
- The DAREarts Cultural Award in recognition of the Lieutenant Governor's Book Program

=== Honorary degrees ===
Bartleman was awarded many honorary degrees for his service, including the following:

Province	Date	School	Degree
Ontario	25 June 2002	University of Western Ontario	Doctor of Laws (LL.D.)
Ontario	Fall 2003	York University	Doctor of Laws (LL.D.)
Ontario	2004	Queen's University	Doctor of Laws (LL.D.)
Ontario	2004	Algoma University	Doctor of Laws (LL.D.)
Ontario	2004	Laurentian University	Doctor of Laws (LL.D.)
Ontario	2005	Ryerson University	Doctorate
Ontario	Spring 2005	University of Windsor	Doctor of Laws (LL.D.)
Quebec	29 May 2006	McGill University	Doctor of Letters (D.Litt.)
Ontario	2006	Nipissing University	Doctor of Education (D.Ed.)
Ontario	2008	OCAD University	Doctorate
Ontario	2013	Carleton University	Doctorate
Ontario	10 June 2016	University of Toronto	Doctor of Laws (LL.D.)

=== Honorific eponyms ===
Awards

- Ontario: James Bartleman Aboriginal Youth Creative Writing Awards

== Bibliography ==
- Out of Muskoka (2002)
- On Six Continents (2004)
- Rollercoaster: My Hectic Years as Jean Chrétien's Diplomatic Advisor (2005)
- Raisin Wine: A Boyhood in a Different Muskoka (2007)
- As Long as the Rivers Flow (2011)
- The Redemption of Oscar Wolf (2013)
- Exceptional Circumstances (2015)
- Seasons of Hope (2016)
- A Matter of Conscience (2018)

== See also ==
- The Canadian Crown and Aboriginal peoples
- List of Canadian university leaders

Government offices
Preceded by Hilary Weston	Lieutenant Governor of Ontario; 2002–2007	Succeeded by David Onley
Diplomatic posts
Preceded by Gary Richard Harman	Ambassador Extraordinary and Plenipotentiary to Cuba; 1981–1983	Succeeded by Kenneth Bryce Williamson
Preceded by Vernon George Turner	High Commissioner to Cyprus; 1985–1990	Succeeded by Michael Dougall Bell
Preceded by Vernon George Turner	Ambassador Extraordinary and Plenipotentiary to Israel; 1986–1990	Succeeded by Michael Dougall Bell
Preceded by Gordon Scott Smith	Ambassador and Permanent Representative to the North Atlantic Council; 1980	Succeeded by Admiral John R. Anderson
Preceded by Arthur C. Perron	High Commissioner to South Africa; 1984–1987	Succeeded by Lucie Geneviève Edwards
Preceded by Arthur C. Perron	High Commissioner to Mauritius; 1998	Succeeded by Lucie Geneviève Edwards
Preceded by Arthur C. Perron	High Commissioner to Namibia; 1998	Succeeded by Lucie Geneviève Edwards
Preceded by Brian Schumacher	High Commissioner to the Solomon Islands; 1999	Succeeded by Jean T. Fournier
Preceded by Arthur C. Perron	High Commissioner to Swaziland; 1999	Succeeded by Lucie Geneviève Edwards
Preceded by Arthur C. Perron	High Commissioner to Lesotho; 1999	Succeeded by Sandelle D. Scrimshaw
Preceded by Established	Ambassador Extraordinary and Plenipotentiary to Palau; 1999	Succeeded by Jean T. Fournier
Preceded by Brian Schumacher	High Commissioner to Australia; 1999–2000	Succeeded by Jean T. Fournier
Preceded by Brian Schumacher	High Commissioner to Vanuatu; 2000–2002	Succeeded by Jean T. Fournier
Preceded by Established	Ambassador Extraordinary and Plenipotentiary to the Marshall Islands; 2000–2002	Succeeded by Jean T. Fournier
Preceded by Brian Schumacher	High Commissioner to Nauru; 2000–2002	Succeeded by Jean T. Fournier
Preceded by Established	Ambassador Extraordinary and Plenipotentiary to Micronesia; 2000–2002	Succeeded by Jean T. Fournier
Preceded by Jean-Pierre Juneau	Head of Mission to the European Community; 2000–2002	Succeeded by Jeremy Kinsman
