= Laurier (federal electoral district) =

Former federal electoral district in Quebec, Canada

Quebec electoral district

Defunct federal electoral district
- Legislature: House of Commons
- District created: 1933
- District abolished: 1987
- First contested: 1935
- Last contested: 1984

Laurier, a federal electoral district in Quebec, Canada, was represented in the House of Commons of Canada from 1935 to 1988.

It was set up in 1933 from parts of Laurier—Outremont and Saint-Denis ridings. It was abolished in 1987 when it was redistributed into Laurier—Sainte-Marie, Outremont, Rosemont and Saint-Henri—Westmount ridings.

The riding was re-created in 2003, and renamed Laurier—Sainte-Marie in 2004.

== Members of Parliament ==
This riding elected the following members of Parliament:

Parliament	Years	Member	Party
Laurier; Riding created from Laurier—Outremont and Saint-Denis
18th	1935–1940	Ernest Bertrand	Liberal
19th	1940–1945	Ernest Bertrand	Liberal
20th	1945–1949	Ernest Bertrand	Liberal
21st	1949–1949	Ernest Bertrand	Liberal
21st	1949–1953	J.-Eugène Lefrançois	Liberal
22nd	1953–1957	J.-Eugène Lefrançois	Liberal
23rd	1957–1958	Lionel Chevrier	Liberal
24th	1958–1962	Lionel Chevrier	Liberal
25th	1962–1963	Lionel Chevrier	Liberal
26th	1963–1963	Lionel Chevrier	Liberal
26th	1964–1965	Fernand Leblanc	Liberal
27th	1965–1968	Fernand Leblanc	Liberal
28th	1968–1972	Fernand Leblanc	Liberal
29th	1972–1974	Fernand Leblanc	Liberal
30th	1974–1979	Fernand Leblanc	Liberal
31st	1979–1980	David Berger	Liberal
32nd	1980–1984	David Berger	Liberal
33rd	1984–1988	David Berger	Liberal
Riding dissolved into Laurier—Sainte-Marie, Outremont, Rosemont and Saint-Henri—Westmount

== Election results ==
1935 Canadian federal election
Party	Candidate	Votes
Liberal	Ernest Bertrand	12,998
Independent Liberal	David Rochon	6,454
Conservative	Omer Langlois	4,913
Reconstruction	Georges Mayrand	3,018

1940 Canadian federal election
Party	Candidate	Votes
Liberal	Ernest Bertrand	21,069
National Government	Donat Larivée	4,072

1945 Canadian federal election
Party	Candidate	Votes
Liberal	Ernest Bertrand	22,520
Bloc populaire	Émile-Dostaler O'Leary	5,145
Co-operative Commonwealth	Jean-J. Beauchamp	1,924
Progressive Conservative	Louis-Marcel Jr. Lymburner	1,910

1949 Canadian federal election
Party	Candidate	Votes
Liberal	Ernest Bertrand	15,578
Independent	Jacques Sauriol	2,845
Progressive Conservative	Edward Auerback	1,735
Co-operative Commonwealth	Pierre Archambault	782

By-election on 24 October 1949 Bertrand accepted an office of emolument under the Crown, 24 August 1949
Party	Candidate	Votes
Liberal	J.-Eugène Lefrançois	10,164
Labor–Progressive	Pierre Gélinas	713

1953 Canadian federal election
Party	Candidate	Votes
Liberal	J.-Eugène Lefrançois	12,648
Progressive Conservative	Claude Nolin	4,642
Co-operative Commonwealth	Amédée Jasmin	376
Labor–Progressive	Jeannette Brunelle	364

1957 Canadian federal election
Party	Candidate	Votes
Liberal	Lionel Chevrier	11,336
Progressive Conservative	René Duranleau	5,321
Independent Liberal	Armand Ouellette	712
Labor–Progressive	Henri Gagnon	342
Co-operative Commonwealth	Guy Ouellette	270

1958 Canadian federal election
Party	Candidate	Votes
Liberal	Lionel Chevrier	10,125
Progressive Conservative	Paul Leclair	8,915
Co-operative Commonwealth	Guy Ouellette	741

1962 Canadian federal election
Party	Candidate	Votes
Liberal	Lionel Chevrier	8,255
Progressive Conservative	Albert Guilbeault	5,466
Social Credit	Liliane Vien-Beaudet,	1,419
New Democratic	A.-René Tremblay	1,360

1963 Canadian federal election
Party	Candidate	Votes
Liberal	Lionel Chevrier	8,059
Social Credit	Gilles Caouette	4,282
Progressive Conservative	Albert Guilbeault	3,245
New Democratic	Paul Massé	2,379

By-election on 10 February 1964 Chevrier resigned, 27 December 1963
Party	Candidate	Votes
Liberal	Fernand Leblanc	5,349
Ralliement créditiste	Gilles Caouette	2,232
Progressive Conservative	J. René Paquin	1,866
New Democratic	Gérard Picard	688
Unknown	André Goulet	216

1965 Canadian federal election
Party	Candidate	Votes
Liberal	Fernand Leblanc	7,032
Progressive Conservative	Gérard Locas	2,251
New Democratic	Jean-Jacques Danis	1,925
Ralliement créditiste	J.-Alfred Lévesque	1,704

1968 Canadian federal election
Party	Candidate	Votes
Liberal	Fernand Leblanc	10,040
Independent	Hubert Falardeau	4,402
Progressive Conservative	Julius Briskin	2,827
New Democratic	Gaston Mckenty	843
Ralliement créditiste	Joseph-Wilfrid Banville	695
Independent	Marcel Landry	480

1972 Canadian federal election
Party	Candidate	Votes
Liberal	Fernand Leblanc	10,936
Social Credit	J.-A. Lévesque	3,789
Progressive Conservative	Raymond Trottier	3,320
New Democratic	Jean-Paul Guay	2,290
Independent	Jeannette Walsh	155
Independent	David Keith Orton	132

1974 Canadian federal election
Party	Candidate	Votes
Liberal	Fernand Leblanc	10,085
Progressive Conservative	Bernard Paradis	3,310
New Democratic	Roger Gauthier	1,646
Social Credit	Guy Lévesque	1,582
Independent	Fernand Boubou Boucher	246
Marxist–Leninist	Christiane Robidoux	182
Communist	Jeanette Walsh	100

1979 Canadian federal election
Party	Candidate	Votes
Liberal	David Berger	17,366
Social Credit	Gérard Baillarger	3,250
Progressive Conservative	Yvon Lanthier	2,790
Rhinoceros	Chatouille Sonia Coté	2,673
New Democratic	Jean-Pierre Bourdouxhe	1,934
Union populaire	Lucie Desrosiers	299
Communist	Guy Desautels	179
Marxist–Leninist	Bernard Deslières	118

1980 Canadian federal election
Party	Candidate	Votes
Liberal	David Berger	16,201
Rhinoceros	Sonia Chatouille Coté	3,067
New Democratic	Jean-Pierre Bourdouxhe	2,216
Progressive Conservative	Marc Legris	1,572
Social Credit	Edmond-Louis Girard	534
Independent	Louise Baillargeon	346
Communist	Claire Durand	107
Independent	André Frappier	102
Union populaire	Lucien Tremblay	95
Marxist–Leninist	Bernard Deslières	63

1984 Canadian federal election
Party	Candidate	Votes
Liberal	David Berger	9,302
Progressive Conservative	Roland Gagné	7,720
New Democratic	Jean-Pierre Juneau	4,595
Rhinoceros	François Yo Gourd	3,247
Parti nationaliste	Jean Saint-Amour	906
Green	Robert Silverman	751
Social Credit	Gilles Coté	194
Communist	Brian O'Keefe	130
Commonwealth of Canada	Jean Langevin	53

== See also ==
- List of Canadian electoral districts
- Historical federal electoral districts of Canada
