= Ross Webster =

Ross Webster may refer to:

- Ross Webster, character in Superman III
- A. Ross Webster (1903–1988), Canadian politician
