= List of ambassadors of Canada to Cuba =

Ambassador of Canada to Cuba
- Incumbent; Marianick Tremblay since August 22, 2024
- Seat: Embassy of Canada, Havana
- Nominator: Prime Minister of Canada
- Appointer: Governor General of Canada
- Term length: At His Majesty's pleasure
- Inaugural holder: Joseph Jacques Janvier Émile Vaillancourt
- Formation: January 30, 1945

The ambassador of Canada to Cuba is the official representative of the Canadian government to the government of Cuba. The official title for the ambassador is Ambassador Extraordinary and Plenipotentiary of Canada to the Republic of Cuba. The ambassador of Canada to Cuba is Marianick Tremblay who was appointed on the advice of Prime Minister Justin Trudeau on August 22, 2024.

The Embassy of Canada is located at Calle 30, No. 518 esquina a 7ma, Miramar, Havana, 11300, Cuba.

== History of diplomatic relations ==
Diplomatic relations between Canada and Cuba were established on March 16, 1945, with the first envoy, Joseph Jacques Janvier Émile Vaillancourt, appointed on the advice of Prime Minister W.L. Mackenzie King on January 30, 1945. Canada's first ambassador was appointed on January 21, 1950, and the Canadian legation was given embassy status on September 5, 1950.

== List of ambassadors of Canada to Cuba ==
No.	Name	Term of office			Career	Prime Minister nominated by	Ref.
No.	Name	Start Date	PoC.	End Date	Career	Prime Minister nominated by	Ref.
1	Joseph Jacques Janvier Émile Vaillancourt	January 30, 1945	May 8, 1945	December 1947	Non-Career	W. L. Mackenzie King (1935–1948)	
2	Charles Pierre Hébert	January 22, 1948	March 16, 1948	February 1949	Career	W. L. Mackenzie King (1935–1948)	
3	Ephraim Herbert Coleman	January 19, 1949	April 28, 1949	October 25, 1950	Non-Career	Louis St. Laurent (1948–1957)	
4	Ephraim Herbert Coleman	July 21, 1950	October 25, 1950		Non-Career	Louis St. Laurent (1948–1957)	
5	Harry Albert Scott	October 23, 1951	January 15, 1952	November 1956	Career	Louis St. Laurent (1948–1957)	
6	Hector Allard	January 10, 1957	January 29, 1957	June 23, 1959	Career	Louis St. Laurent (1948–1957)	
7	Allan Cunningham Anderson	September 25, 1959	October 9, 1959	May 23, 1961	Career	John G. Diefenbaker (1957–1963)	
8	George Pirkis Kidd	April 14, 1961	July 5, 1961	January 4, 1964	Career	John G. Diefenbaker (1957–1963)	
9	Léon Mayrand	December 17, 1963	April 7, 1964	May 3, 1970	Career	Lester B. Pearson (1963–1968)	
10	Kenneth Charles Brown	May 28, 1970	November 13, 1970	July 16, 1973	Career	Pierre Elliott Trudeau (1968–1979) (1980–1984)	
11	Malcolm Norman Bow	July 3, 1973	November 2, 1973	July 23, 1975	Career	Pierre Elliott Trudeau (1968–1979) (1980–1984)	
12	James Edward Hyndman	October 21, 1975	October 11, 1975	July 30, 1977	Career	Pierre Elliott Trudeau (1968–1979) (1980–1984)	
13	Gary Richard Harman	July 14, 1977	September 22, 1977	June 21, 1981	Career	Pierre Elliott Trudeau (1968–1979) (1980–1984)	
14	James Bartleman	July 29, 1981	September 10, 1981	September 6, 1983	Career	Pierre Elliott Trudeau (1968–1979) (1980–1984)	
15	Kenneth Bryce Williamson	April 5, 1984	December 29, 1983	July 8, 1986	Career	Pierre Elliott Trudeau (1968–1979) (1980–1984)	
16	Michael Kergin	July 23, 1986	September 19, 1986	July 9, 1989	Career	Brian Mulroney (1984–1993)	
17	Robert Morrice Middleton	September 28, 1989	October 9, 1989	January 4, 1992	Career	Brian Mulroney (1984–1993)	
18	Julie Loranger	December 12, 1991	January 10, 1992	January 25, 1993	Career	Brian Mulroney (1984–1993)	
19	Mark Entwistle	August 6, 1993	August 5, 1993	July 4, 1997	Career	Kim Campbell (1993)	
20	Keith H. Christie	July 10, 1997	August 4, 1997		Career	Jean Chrétien (1993–2003)	
21	Michael Small	July 26, 2000	October 2, 2000		Career	Jean Chrétien (1993–2003)	
22	Alexandra Bugailiskis	July 15, 2003		August 3, 2007	Career	Jean Chrétien (1993–2003)	
23	Jean-Pierre Juneau	July 31, 2007	September 13, 2007	August 24, 2010	Career	Stephen Harper (2006–2015)	
24	Matthew Levin	August 10, 2010	October 7, 2010	August 29, 2013	Career	Stephen Harper (2006–2015)	
25	Yves Gagnon	August 12, 2013	October 9, 2013	August 13, 2016	Career	Stephen Harper (2006–2015)	
26	Patrick Parisot	July 18, 2016	September 22, 2016	September 7, 2018	Career	Justin Trudeau (2015–2025)	
27	Perry Calderwood	May 2, 2019	October 11, 2019		Career	Justin Trudeau (2015–2025)	
28	Geoff Gartshore	February 18, 2022	May 12, 2022		Career	Justin Trudeau (2015–2025)	
29	Marianick Tremblay	August 27, 2024	November 20, 2024	September 21, 2026	Career	Justin Trudeau (2015–2025)	
30	Carmen Sorger	September 22, 2026			Career	Mark Carney (2025–Present)	

== See also ==
- Canada–Cuba relations
