= Norman Spector =

Canadian journalist, diplomat, civil servant and newspaper publisher

3rd Chief of Staff to the Prime Minister
- In office 1990–1992
- Prime Minister: Brian Mulroney
- Preceded by: Stanley Hartt
- Succeeded by: Hugh Segal

Personal details
- Born: March 6, 1949 (age 77) Montreal, Quebec, Canada
- Education: McGill University (BA, 1970); Columbia University (MPhil, 1972; PhD, 1977); Syracuse University (MS, 1974)
- Profession: Journalist, diplomat, civil servant, publisher

Norman Spector (born March 6, 1949) is a Canadian journalist and former diplomat, civil servant, and newspaper publisher.

== Early life and career ==
Born in Montreal, Quebec, Spector received a Bachelor of Arts with Honours in Political Science, from McGill University in 1970. Awarded a Woodrow Wilson Fellowship, he received a Master of Philosophy degree in Political Science from Columbia University in 1972 and a Ph.D. in 1977. In 1974, as a Newhouse Fellow, he received a Master of Science degree in Television, Film and Radio from Syracuse University. In 1974–1975, Spector was a lecturer at St. Paul's College of the University of Ottawa.

== Civil service ==
In 1975, he joined the Ontario civil service in the Ministry of Transportation and Communications and held the positions of Manager, Director, and Executive Director. In 1980, he joined the British Columbia civil service serving as Deputy Secretary, Policy for the Ministry of Intergovernmental Relations. From 1981 to 1986, he was Assistant Deputy Minister and then Deputy Minister in Bill Bennett's Office of the Premier, where he advised during the 1981 constitutional discussions, and later negotiated an end to the BCGEU strike of 1982 and to a looming BC general strike in 1983. From 1986 to 1990, he was Secretary to the Cabinet for Federal-Provincial Relations in Ottawa, where he was responsible for managing relations with the provinces during the Canada-US free trade negotiations, the first ministers conference on aboriginal constitutional matters, and the Meech Lake accord in April, 1987. From 1990 to 1992, he was Brian Mulroney's Chief of Staff in the Office of the Prime Minister during the First Gulf War and the ending of the Oka Crisis.

From 1992 to 1995, he was Ambassador of Canada to Israel, the first Jewish Canadian to hold the post, and High Commissioner to Cyprus. After the in Gaza-Jericho agreement was signed between Israeli and Palestinian leaders in 1994, he became Canada's first Representative to the Palestinian Authority. From 1995 to 1996, he was President of the Atlantic Canada Opportunities Agency.

== Corporate career, TV pundit and newspaper columnist ==
Spector resigned from the public service in 1996, and upon his departure The Globe and Mail editorialized: "The last veil was stripped from the Atlantic Canada Opportunities Agency last week with the departure of Norman Spector. The veteran public servant had been appointed president of the federal government's East Coast regional development body last year in order to clean up ACOA's operations and repair its shady reputation. His exit is an acknowledgment that such attempts are doomed to failure. There is no longer any sense pretending that ACOA serves any useful economic purpose."

He became Vice-President, Corporate Affairs for Imperial Tobacco Limited in September 1996. In January 1997, he was appointed publisher of The Jerusalem Post. In the 1990s and 2000s, he appeared on numerous TV panels in English and French and wrote a column in The Globe and Mail and in Le Devoir. While at The Globe and Mail, Mr. Spector wrote "Why Ms. Harper joined the PM's CTV Christmas interview," citing a veteran Ottawa Citizen columnist who reported that "in Ottawa, tongues have been wagging for two years about trouble in one political marriage. One of the partners is now said to have left the nest. It hasn't made the newspapers, at least not yet." The Globe and Mail removed the blog post from its website, saying that Spector fell short of its "editorial standards with respect to fairness, balance and accuracy."

He published a book, Chronicle of a War Foretold: How Mideast Peace Became America's Fight in 2003 and, a year later, wrote about his experience working for Mulroney in the Afterword to A Secret Trial—William Kaplan's second book on what is popularly known as the Airbus affair. Spector appeared as a witness in early 2008 at the House of Commons of Canada Ethics Committee's hearings on relations between Mulroney and German-Canadian lobbyist Karlheinz Schreiber, which is formally known as the review of the Airbus settlement. A public inquiry, called by Prime Minister Stephen Harper, also took place on these matters, following the Ethics Committee's hearings.

In October 2006, Spector gained a considerable amount of press coverage for referring to Belinda Stronach as "a bitch" after her then-boyfriend and fellow Conservative MP Peter MacKay referred to her as a "dog" in the House of Commons. In May 2006, Stronach agreed to join the Liberal cabinet of Prime Minister Paul Martin after dining with MacKay and not telling him what she was about to do. While Stronach demanded an apology from MacKay, she did not ask that Spector apologize and he did not provide one.

Since 2013, Spector has been a member of Canadian Broadcasting Corporation's "On the Island" political panel.

Following the British Columbia election of 2017, he advised Green Party leader Andrew Weaver in negotiations with the Liberal and New Democratic Party that resulted in the defeat of the former on a non-confidence vote, and the formation by the latter of a minority government supported by the Greens.

Government offices
Preceded by Stanley Hartt	Chief of Staff of the Prime Minister's Office; 1990–1992	Succeeded by Hugh Segal
Diplomatic posts
Preceded by Michael Dougall Bell	Canadian Ambassador to Israel; 1992–1995	Succeeded by David Berger
Preceded by Michael Dougall Bell	Canadian High Commissioner to Cyprus; 1992–1995	Succeeded by Alexandra Bugailiskis
