= 1984 Liberal Party of Canada leadership election =

Party election in Canada

- June 16, 1984
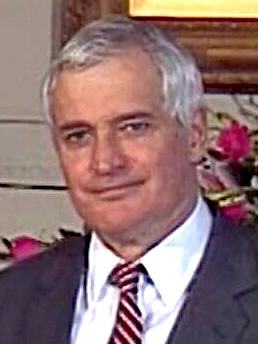

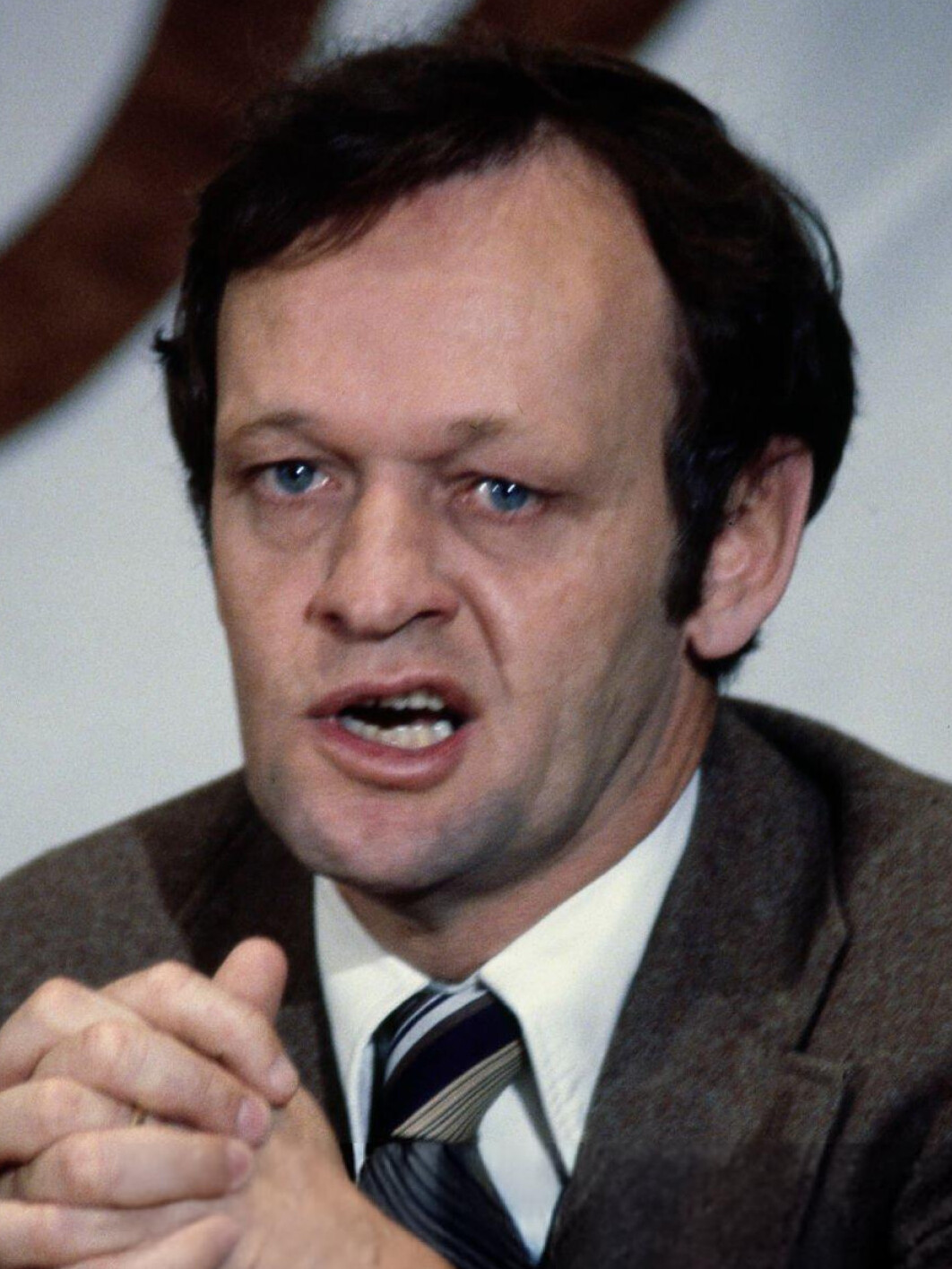

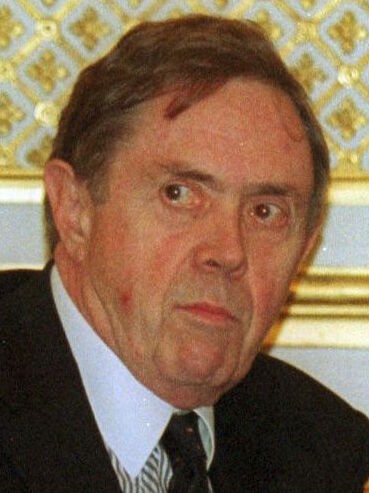
Candidate	John Turner	Jean Chrétien
Second ballot delegate count	1,862 (53.9%)	1,398 (40.5%)
First ballot delegate count	1,539 (46.3%)	1,067 (31.0%)
		LIB
Candidate	Don Johnston	John Roberts
Second ballot delegate count	192 (5.6%)	Withdrew
First ballot delegate count	278 (8.1%)	185 (5.4%)
Leader before election
Pierre Trudeau
Elected Leader
John Turner

1984 Liberal leadership election
- Date: June 16, 1984
- Convention: Ottawa Civic Centre
- Resigning leader: Pierre Trudeau
- Won by: John Turner
- Ballots: 2
- Candidates: 7

The Liberal Party of Canada held a leadership election on June 16, 1984, to replace retiring Liberal leader and sitting prime minister Pierre Trudeau. The convention elected former finance minister John Turner, who at the time was not sitting in the House of Commons, as its leader on the second ballot, defeating another former finance minister, Jean Chrétien.

== Candidates ==
=== Declared ===
==== Jean Chrétien ====
Jean Chrétien, 50, MP for Saint-Maurice since 1963, was minister of energy and had been minister of justice responsible for constitutional negotiations, playing a significant role in the patriation of the Constitution of Canada. First appointed to Cabinet by Lester Pearson in 1967, he had served in several senior portfolios under Trudeau, including minister of finance.

- Supporters in caucus (6 MPs): Charles Caccia (Davenport), Roland de Corneille (Eglinton—Lawrence), Bud Cullen (Sarnia—Lambton), David Collenette (York East), Jean-Robert Gauthier (Ottawa—Vanier), Roméo LeBlanc (Westmorland—Kent)

==== Don Johnston ====
Don Johnston, 47, MP for Saint-Henri—Westmount in Montreal since 1978, was president of the treasury board, and had served in several other economic portfolios.

- Supporters in caucus (4 MPs, 1 Senator): Jack Burghardt (London West), James Fleming (York West), Bryce Mackasey (Lincoln), Raymond Savard (Verdun), Senator Gildas Molgat (Manitoba).

==== Mark MacGuigan ====
Mark MacGuigan, 53, MP from Windsor-Walkerville since 1968 and a former dean of law, was the minister of justice and a former minister of external affairs.

==== John Munro ====
John Munro, 53, an MP for Hamilton East since 1962, was minister of Indian affairs and northern development.

==== John Roberts ====
John Roberts, 48, MP for St. Paul's, was minister of employment and immigration.

==== John Turner ====
John Turner, 55, former MP for Ottawa-Orleans (1968–1976) and previously for St. Lawrence—St. George, Quebec (1962–1968), had served in Cabinet under Lester Pearson and Trudeau and had been minister of justice and minister of finance until resigning from cabinet in 1975 over a policy dispute over wage and price freezes. Since then, he had been a corporate lawyer on Bay Street until his return to politics in 1984. Turner had run for the leadership previously in 1968, placing third on the final ballot.

Supporters in caucus

- Lloyd Axworthy (Winnipeg South Centre)
- Judy Erola (Nickel Belt)
- Bob Kaplan (York Centre)
- Ed Lumley (Stormont—Dundas)
- André Ouellet (Papineau)
- Jean-Luc Pépin (Ottawa—Carleton)
- Gerald Regan (Halifax)

==== Eugene Whelan ====
Eugene Whelan, 59, MP for Essex-Windsor since 1962, had been minister of agriculture from 1972 to 1979, when the Liberals lost power, and again since 1980.

== Results ==
First ballot
TURNER, John Napier 1,593 (46%)
CHRÉTIEN, Joseph Jacques Jean 1,067 (31%)
JOHNSTON, Donald James 278 (8%)
ROBERTS, John (Moody) 185
MACGUIGAN, Mark R. 135
MUNRO, John Carr 93
WHELAN, Eugene Francis 84
Spoiled ballots 2
Total votes cast 3,437

Whelan eliminated, supports Chrétien. MacGuigan withdraws and supports Turner. Munro and Roberts withdraw and support Chrétien.

Second ballot
TURNER, John Napier 1,862 (54%)
CHRÉTIEN, Joseph Jacques Jean 1,398 (40%)
JOHNSTON, Donald James 192 (6%)
Spoiled ballots 1
Total votes cast 3,453

First ballot
Turner	46.35%
Chrétien	31.04%
Johnston	8.09%
Roberts	5.38%
MacGuigan	3.93%
Munro	2.71%
Whelan	2.44%
Spoilt ballots	0.06%

Second ballot
Turner	53.92%
Chrétien	40.49%
Johnston	5.56%
Spoilt ballots	0.03%
