= Ernest Bertrand =

Canadian lawyer and politician

The Honourable Ernest Bertrand
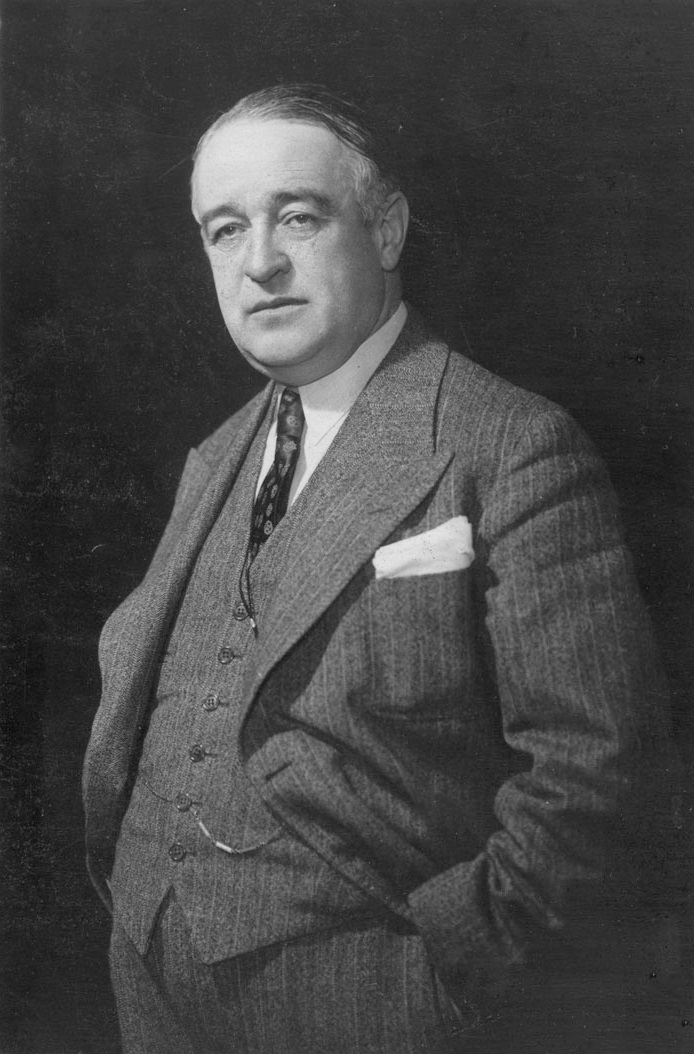

Member of the Canadian Parliament for Laurier
- In office 1935–1949
- Preceded by: District was created in 1933
- Succeeded by: J.-Eugène Lefrançois

Personal details
- Born: December 14, 1888 Somerset, Quebec, Canada
- Died: October 11, 1958 (aged 69)
- Party: Liberal

Ernest Bertrand, PC (December 14, 1888 – October 11, 1958) was a Canadian politician.

Born in Somerset, Quebec, he was first elected to the House of Commons of Canada representing the Quebec riding of Laurier in the 1935 federal election. A Liberal, he was re-elected in 1940, 1945, and 1949. He was the Minister of Fisheries, Minister of Fisheries (Acting), and Postmaster General in the cabinet of Mackenzie King.

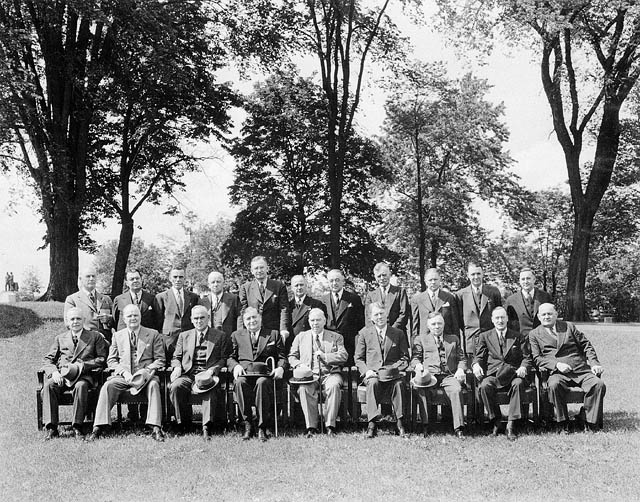
Hon. Ernest Bertrand and colleagues in the 16th Canadian Ministry (Rear, L-R): Hons. J. J. McCann, Paul Martin, Joseph Jean, J. A. Glen, Brooke Claxton, Alphonse Fournier, Ernest Bertrand, A. G. L. McNaughton, Lionel Chevrier, D. C. Abbott, D. L. MacLaren

A lawyer by training, he had served as Senior Crown Prosecutor before entering politics, and had been an associate of Charles Trudeau.
