= J.-Eugène Lefrançois =

Canadian liberal party politician

The Hon. J.-Eugène Lefrançois

Member of Parliament for Laurier
- In office 1949–1957
- Preceded by: Ernest Bertrand
- Succeeded by: Lionel Chevrier

Senator for Repentigny, Quebec
- In office 25 April 1957 – 5 November 1976
- Appointed by: Louis St. Laurent
- Preceded by: Pamphile Réal Du Tremblay
- Succeeded by: Pietro Rizzuto

Personal details
- Born: 9 August 1896 Montreal, Quebec, Canada
- Died: 13 January 1979 (aged 82)
- Party: Liberal
- Spouse(s): Rosina Bélair (m. 17 June 1918)
- Profession: industrialist

J.-Eugène Lefrançois (9 August 1896 – 13 January 1979) was a Liberal party member of the House of Commons of Canada and the Senate. He was born in Montreal, Quebec and became an industrialist by career.

In 1936, Lefrançois made an unsuccessful attempt to win a seat in the Legislative Assembly of Quebec.

He was first elected to Parliament at the Laurier riding in the 1949 general election and re-elected for a second term in 1953. In April 1957, as he completed his House of Commons term in the 22nd Canadian Parliament, Lefrançois was appointed to the Senate under Quebec's Repentigny constituency where he remained until 5 November 1976.

Lefrançois died on 13 January 1979 aged 82, survived by his wife Rosina, a son and a daughter.
