= Charles Drury =

Canadian politician (1912-1991)

Brigadier-General the Honourable Charles Drury PC OC CBE DSO QC

Minister of Public Works
- In office 8 August 1974 – 14 September 1976
- Prime Minister: Pierre Trudeau
- Preceded by: Jean-Eudes Dubé
- Succeeded by: J. Judd Buchanan

Minister of Finance
- Acting; 10 September 1975 – 25 September 1975
- Prime Minister: Pierre Trudeau
- Preceded by: John Turner
- Succeeded by: Donald Stovel Macdonald

President of the Treasury Board
- In office 6 July 1968 – 7 August 1974
- Prime Minister: Pierre Trudeau
- Preceded by: Edgar Benson
- Succeeded by: Jean Chrétien

Minister of National Defence
- Acting; 7 September 1972 – 26 November 1972
- Prime Minister: Pierre Trudeau
- Preceded by: Jean-Eudes Dubé (acting)
- Succeeded by: James Armstrong Richardson
- Acting; 17 September 1970 – 23 September 1970
- Prime Minister: Pierre Trudeau
- Preceded by: Léo Cadieux
- Succeeded by: Donald Stovel Macdonald

Member of Parliament for Westmount
- In office 25 June 1968 – 26 January 1978
- Preceded by: Riding created
- Succeeded by: Don Johnston

Member of Parliament for Saint-Antoine—Westmount
- In office 18 June 1962 – 24 June 1968
- Preceded by: A. Ross Webster
- Succeeded by: Riding dissolved

Personal details
- Born: Charles Mills Drury; 17 May 1912 Westmount, Quebec, Canada
- Died: 12 January 1991 (aged 78) Gatineau, Quebec, Canada
- Party: Liberal
- Spouse: Jane Ferrier Counsell (m. 1939; died 1971)
- Children: 4
- Relatives: Walter L. Gordon (brother-in-law)

Military service
- Allegiance: Canada
- Branch/service: Canadian Army
- Years of service: 1933–1970
- Rank: Brigadier-General
- Unit: Royal Canadian Artillery
- Commands: 4th Field Regiment, Royal Canadian Artillery
- Battles/wars: World War II
- Awards: Distinguished Service Order

Brigadier-General Charles Mills "Bud" Drury PC OC CBE DSO QC (17 May 1912 – 12 January 1991) was a Canadian military officer, lawyer, civil servant, businessman and politician.

== Early life and education ==
Born in Westmount, Quebec, he was the elder son of Victor Montague Drury (1884–1962), a prominent businessman who was the son of Major-General Charles William Drury (1856–1913) and the brother-in-law of Max Aitken, 1st Baron Beaverbrook. He was educated at Selwyn House School and Bishop's College School, and he later attended the Royal Military College of Canada, McGill University (B.C.L., 1936) and the University of Paris.

== Career ==
Drury served in the Canadian Armed Forces from 1933 to 1936, then he practised law from 1936 to 1939. During World War II, he was a Canadian Army officer and from March−July 1944 commanded the 4th Field Regiment of the Royal Canadian Artillery, part of the 2nd Canadian Infantry Division, which took part in Operation Overlord, before being made the 2nd Division's General Staff Officer Grade 1 (GSO1) and later becoming the Commander, Royal Artillery (CRA) of the 4th Canadian (Armoured) Division. He was promoted to the rank of Brigadier-General in 1945. After the war, he headed the United Nations Relief and Rehabilitation Administration mission in Poland from 1945 to 1947.

He then entered the Canadian civil service and was appointed as deputy minister of the Department of National Defence from 1949 to 1955. He spent 1955 to 1962 working on private family business before running for election to the House of Commons of Canada.

Drury was elected as a Liberal party Member of Parliament (MP) for the Montreal riding of Saint-Antoine—Westmount (later Westmount) in the 1962 federal election. He was re-elected in the 1963, 1965, 1968, 1972 and 1974 elections.

He held many ministerial positions in the governments of prime ministers Lester Pearson and Pierre Trudeau, including Defence Production, Industry, Trade and Commerce, Treasury Board, National Defence (acting), Public Works and Finance (acting).

After leaving politics in 1978, Drury became chairman of the National Capital Commission from 1978 to 1984. He was made an Officer of the Order of Canada in 1980.

== Electoral record (partial) ==
1974 Canadian federal election: Westmount
Party	Candidate	Votes	%	±%
Liberal	Charles Drury	20,816	57.61	
Progressive Conservative	Michael Meighen	11,575	32.03	
New Democratic	Peter P. Berlow	3,140	8.69	
Social Credit	Joseph Ranger	412	1.14	
Marxist–Leninist	Lawrence Tansey	190	0.53	
Total valid votes		36,133	100.00	
Total rejected ballots		994		
Turnout		37,127	71.96	
Electors on the lists		51,592		
lop.parl.ca

Government offices
Unknown	Deputy Minister of National Defence; 1949–1955	Succeeded by Frank Robert Miller
