= Stanley Hartt =

Canadian lawyer, academic, businessman, and civil servant (1937–2018)

Stanley Hartt OC QC

2nd Chief of Staff to the Prime Minister
- In office 1989–1990
- Prime Minister: Brian Mulroney
- Preceded by: Derek Burney
- Succeeded by: Norman Spector

Personal details
- Born: 11 November 1937 Montreal, Quebec, Canada
- Died: 3 January 2018 (aged 80) Toronto, Ontario, Canada
- Party: Progressive Conservative
- Spouse: Linda Bloomfield (m. 1961)
- Children: 4
- Parent: Maurice Hartt (father)
- Education: McGill University (BA, 1958; MA, 1961; BCL, 1963)

Stanley Herbert Hartt (11 November 1937 – 3 January 2018) was a Canadian lawyer, lecturer, businessman, and civil servant. He was Chief of Staff to Canadian prime minister Brian Mulroney from 1989 to 1990.

== Early life and education ==
Hartt was born in Montreal, Quebec to Maurice Hartt, a Quebec MNA and MP and Rose Gallay. He had a younger brother, Joel Hartt (1940–2009). He received a Bachelor of Arts degree in 1958, a Master of Arts degree in 1961, and a Bachelor of Civil Law degree in 1963 from McGill University. He was called to the Quebec Bar in 1965 and created a Queen's Counsel in 1984. Hartt was married to Linda Bloomfield from 1961 to 1978 and had four children: Heather Hartt-Sussman (born 1965), Michael Hartt (born 1967), and twins James Hartt and Douglas Hartt (born 1973). Hartt also had 7 grandchildren.

== Career ==
From 1962 to 1963, Hartt was a lecturer at Sir George Williams University. From 1965 to 1967 and again from 1972 to 1981, he was a lecturer at McGill University. He also taught at the Labour College of Canada (now affiliated with Athabasca University) in 1963 to 1965.

Hartt recalled in an interview that then Prime Minister Pierre Trudeau suggested in 1978 that Hartt should follow in his father's footsteps and run as a Liberal but he declined and became a support of the Progressive Conservative Party “after they showed me the books.”

From 1985 to 1988, he was the Deputy Minister in the Department of Finance under Finance Minister Michael Wilson. From 1989 to 1990, he was the Chief of Staff for Brian Mulroney. Recalling his career as a chief of staff, Mulroney made this comment to the media: "I will always remember Stanley as a warm and highly valued friend of some 50 years. Stanley played an important role in all the major initiatives of our government, from free trade to the GST, from Meech Lake to the movement to free Nelson Mandela." In addition, he stated that the files Hartt had a hand in “were the basis for the prosperity that Canada enjoys today.” Mulroney was able to accomplished it was driven by the fact that he was an eternal optimist, and that he appreciated leadership and achievement. That's what he'd gone to Ottawa to do, and that's what he achieved.

In 1965, Hartt joined Stikeman Elliott, leaving in 1990. From 1990 to 1996, he was chairman and CEO of Camdev Corporation (formerly Campeau Corporation), a real estate corporation. He later became chairman of Salomon Smith Barney Canada and was Chairman of Citigroup Global Markets Canada until their departure from the Canadian market in 2008. In 2013, Hartt joined Norton Rose Fulbright.

In 1994, he was made an Officer of the Order of Canada.

In November 2016, he held a fundraiser at Norton Rose for Conservative Party of Canada leadership candidate Kellie Leitch. The fundraiser was held shortly after Leitch sent an email congratulating Donald Trump for winning the 2016 United States presidential election and saying the "elites are out of touch." After the leadership race, he criticized Leitch's value test as similar to the “snitch line” presented in the last election and praised fellow leadership candidate Maxime Bernier for having a platform built around "rock-solid economics".

== Death ==
Hartt died from cancer on 3 January 2018, aged 80.

Political offices
| Preceded by Derek Burney | Chief of Staff of the Prime Minister's Office; 1989–1990 | Succeeded by Norman Spector |
