= Louise O'Sullivan (politician) =

Canadian politician

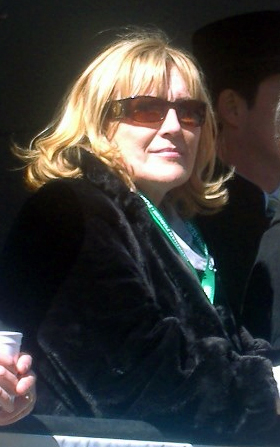
Louise OSullivan cropped

Louise O'Sullivan is a former Montreal city councillor and member of the city's executive committee. She is the founder and leader of Parti Montréal Ville-Marie. She was a candidate for Mayor of Montreal in the city's 2009 Municipal Elections.

== City councillor (2002-2005) ==
She was originally elected in 2001, to represent the Peter-McGill district as a councillor under Gérald Tremblay's Union Montreal party. Tremblay named her to the city's executive committee, where she was responsible for the social development/revenue security and the Business Centre portfolios. Due to a disagreement with the Tremblay administration, she resigned from the executive committee and Union Montréal and spent the rest of her time in council sitting as an independent. For the 2005 municipal elections, she created Équipe Ville-Marie. For the 2009 municipals, this became Parti Montréal Ville-Marie.

== 2006 federal election ==
During the 2006 Canadian federal election, O'Sullivan ran for the Conservative Party of Canada in the riding of Westmount—Ville-Marie. She was defeated by incumbent, Lucienne Robillard, of the Liberal Party of Canada.

2006 Canadian federal election
Party	Candidate	Votes	%	±%	Expenditures
Liberal	Lucienne Robillard	18,884	45.68%	-10.16%	$70,313
Conservative	Louise O'Sullivan	7,295	17.57%	+7.50%	$27,009
New Democratic	Eric Wilson Steedman	6,356	15.37%	+3.38%	$13,082
Bloc Québécois	Sophie Frechette	5,191	12.56%	-2.25%	$9,770
Green	Julie Sabourin	3,451	8.35%	+2.30%	$122
Marxist–Leninist	Serge Lachapelle	94	0.23%	*	$0
Communist	Bill Sloan	69	0.17%	-0.09%	$380

== 2009 mayoral campaign ==
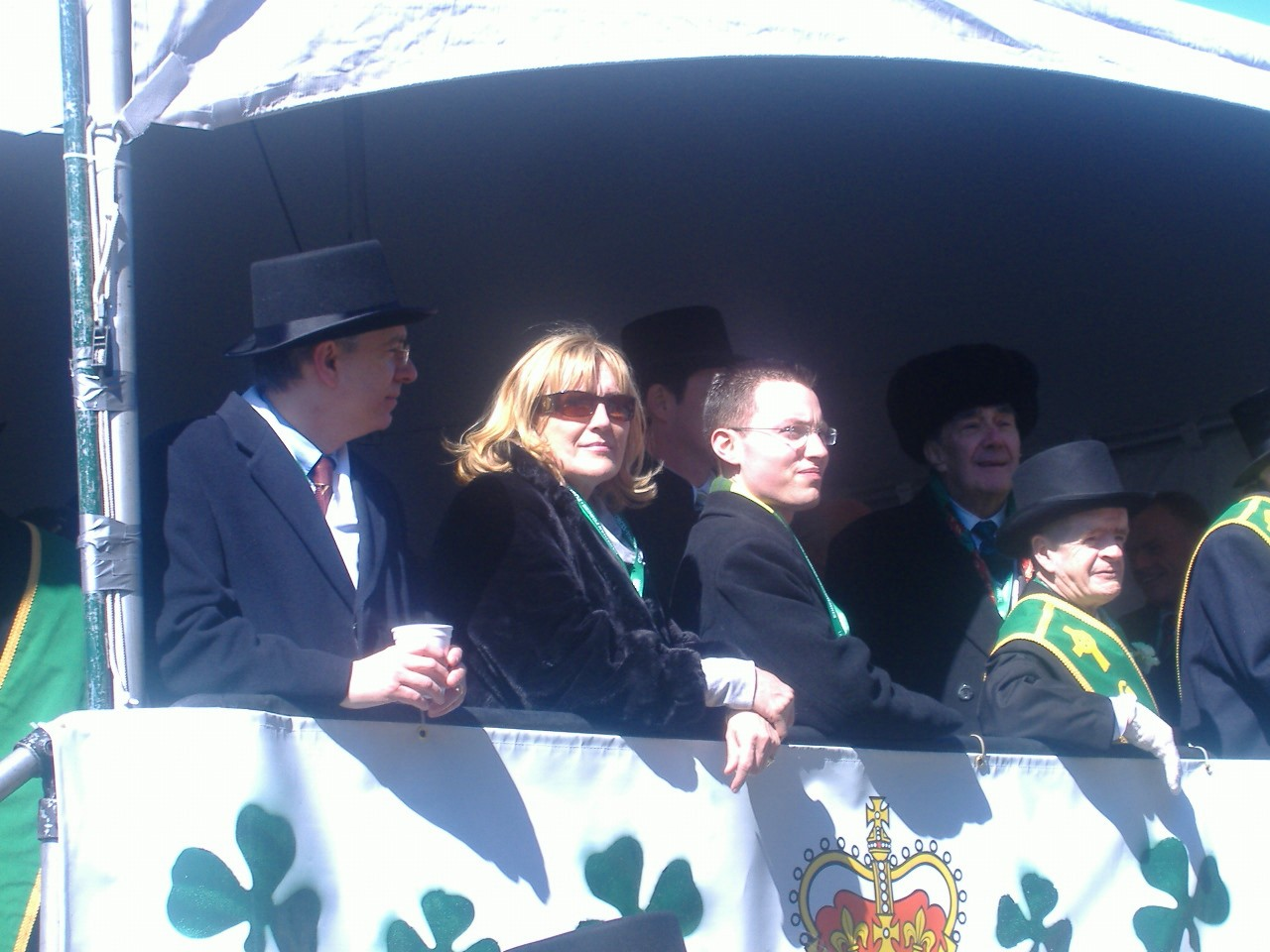
Louise O'Sullivan (centre) during the 2009 Montreal Saint Patrick's Day Parade.

Louise O'Sullivan ran as a mayoral candidate in Montreal during the 2009 municipal elections for Parti Montréal Ville-Marie.

2009 Montreal municipal election
Candidate	Party	Vote	%
Gérald Tremblay (incumbent)	Union Montréal	159,020	37.90%
Louise Harel	Vision Montréal	137,301	32.73%
Richard Bergeron	Projet Montréal	106,768	25.45%
Louise O'Sullivan	Parti Montréal - Ville-Marie	8,490	2.02%
Michel Bédard	Parti Fierté Montréal	5,297	1.26%
Michel Prairie	Independent	2,648	0.63%
