= Westmount—Ville-Marie =

Former federal electoral district in Quebec, Canada

Coordinates: 45.488°N 73.587°W

Quebec electoral district
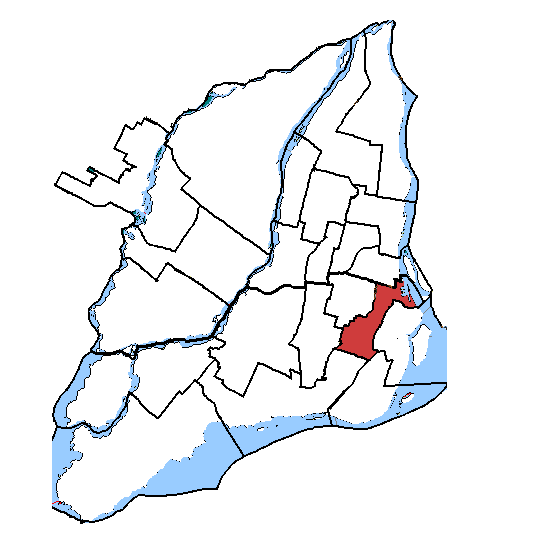
- Westmount—Ville-Marie in relation to other federal electoral districts in Montreal

Defunct federal electoral district
- Legislature: House of Commons
- District created: 1996
- District abolished: 2012
- First contested: 1997
- Last contested: 2011
- District webpage: profile, map

Demographics
- Population (2011): 103,263
- Electors (2011): 77,112
- Area (km²): 15.74
- Census division: Montreal
- Census subdivision(s): Montreal, Westmount

Westmount—Ville-Marie was a federal electoral district in Quebec, Canada, that was represented in the House of Commons of Canada from 1997 to 2015. Its population in 2001 was 97,226.

== Geography ==
The district included the City of Westmount as well as Old Montreal and the southwestern part of Downtown Montreal in the Borough of Ville-Marie, the western part of The Plateau in the Borough of Le Plateau-Mont-Royal and the part of Notre-Dame-de-Grâce east of Hingston Avenue in the Borough of Côte-des-Neiges—Notre-Dame-de-Grâce in the City of Montreal.

=== Political geography ===
The Liberals were strong throughout this riding, but had their strongest support in Westmount. In the 2008 election, the NDP saw their second-strongest result on the island in this riding. Much of their support was concentrated in Notre-Dame-de-Grâce, where they won a handful of polls. In the 2011 election, the NDP surge held the Liberals to a tight margin of victory of 642 votes.

== Demographics ==
According to the 2001 Canadian census

- Ethnic groups: 75.9% White, 5.9% Chinese, 5.1% Arab, 3.7% Black, 2.4% South Asian, 1.8% Latin American, 1.1% West Asian
- Languages: 37.8% English, 29.6% French, 29.3% Others, 3.2% Multiple responses
- Religions: 40.2% Catholic, 12.5% Protestant, 11.9% Jewish, 7.3% Muslim, 4.0% Christian Orthodox, 2.0% Other Christian, 1.3% Buddhist, 19.3% No religion
- Average income: $44,790

== History ==
The electoral district was created in 1996 from parts of Notre-Dame-de-Grâce and Saint-Henri—Westmount ridings.

=== Member of Parliament ===
This riding has elected the following members of Parliament:

Parliament	Years	Member	Party
Westmount—Ville-Marie; Riding created from Notre-Dame-de-Grâce and Saint-Henri—Westmount
36th	1997–2000	Lucienne Robillard	Liberal
37th	2000–2004	Lucienne Robillard	Liberal
38th	2004–2006	Lucienne Robillard	Liberal
39th	2006–2008	Lucienne Robillard	Liberal
40th	2008–2011	Marc Garneau	Liberal
41st	2011–2015	Marc Garneau	Liberal
Riding dissolved into Notre-Dame-de-Grâce—Westmount, Ville-Marie—Le Sud-Ouest—Île-des-Sœurs, Laurier—Sainte-Marie, LaSalle—Émard—Verdun and Outremont

== Election results ==
2011 Canadian federal election
Party	Candidate	Votes	%	±%	Expenditures
Liberal	Marc Garneau	15,346	37.18	−9.29	–
New Democratic	Joanne Corbeil	14,704	35.62	+12.69	–
Conservative	Neil Drabkin	7,218	17.49	+1.68	–
Bloc Québécois	Véronique Roy	2,278	5.52	−1.74	–
Green	Andrew Carkner	1,516	3.67	−3.37	–
Rhinoceros	Victoria Haliburton	140	0.34	+0.18	–
Communist	Bill Sloan	73	0.18	+0.09	–
Total valid votes/expense limit		41,275	99.60		–
Total rejected ballots		165	0.40	−0.18	
Turnout		41,440	53.36	+2.72	
Electors on the lists		77,656			
Liberal hold		Swing		−10.99	

2008 Canadian federal election
Party	Candidate	Votes	%	±%	Expenditures
Liberal	Marc Garneau	18,041	46.47	+0.79	$78,009
New Democratic	Anne Lagacé Dowson	8,904	22.93	+7.56	$79,186
Conservative	Guy Dufort	6,139	15.81	−1.84	$34,968
Bloc Québécois	Charles Larivée	2,818	7.26	−5.30	$8,281
Green	Claude William Genest	2,733	7.04	−1.31	–
Rhinoceros	Judith Vienneau	62	0.16	–	–
Marxist–Leninist	Linda Sullivan	49	0.13	−0.10	–
Independent	David Rovins	47	0.12	–	$30
Communist	Bill Sloan	34	0.09	−0.08	$2,433
Total valid votes/expense limit		38,827	99.43		$83,153
Total rejected ballots		224	0.57	−0.06	
Turnout		39,051	50.64	−3.05	
Eligible voters		77,112			
Liberal hold		Swing		−3.39	

2006 Canadian federal election
Party	Candidate	Votes	%	±%	Expenditures
Liberal	Lucienne Robillard	18,884	45.68	−10.16	$70,313
Conservative	Louise O'Sullivan	7,295	17.65	+7.58	$27,009
New Democratic	Eric Wilson Steedman	6,356	15.37	+3.39	$13,082
Bloc Québécois	Sophie Frechette	5,191	12.56	−2.25	$9,770
Green	Julie Sabourin	3,451	8.35	+2.30	$122
Marxist–Leninist	Serge Lachapelle	94	0.23	*	$0
Communist	Bill Sloan	69	0.17	−0.09	$380
Total valid votes/Expense limit		41,340	99.37	$78,264	
Total rejected ballots		262	0.63	−0.00	
Turnout		41,602	53.69	+1.69	
Eligible voters		77,486			
Liberal hold		Swing		−8.87	

2004 Canadian federal election
Party	Candidate	Votes	%	±%	Expenditures
Liberal	Lucienne Robillard	22,337	55.84	−3.62	$63,132
Bloc Québécois	Louis La Rochelle	5,922	14.81	+3.84	$10,025
New Democratic	Eric Wilson Steedman	4,795	11.99	+6.23	$5,379
Conservative	Robert Gervais	4,027	10.07	−6.57	$53,493
Green	Brian Sarwer-Foner	2,419	6.05	*	$1,039
Marijuana	David John Proctor	396	0.99	*	
Marxist–Leninist	Serge Lachapelle	103	0.26	*	
Total valid votes/Expense limit		39,999	99.37	$78,247	
Total rejected ballots		254	0.63		
Turnout		40,253	52.00		
Eligible voters		77,404			
Liberal hold		Swing		−3.73	

Note: Change is from 2000 redistributed results. Conservative vote is compared to the total of the Canadian Alliance vote and Progressive Conservative vote in 2000 election.

2000 federal election redistributed results
Party	Vote	%
Liberal	23,345	59.47
Progressive Conservative	4,882	12.44
Bloc Québécois	4,304	10.96
New Democratic	2,260	5.76
Canadian Alliance	1,651	4.21
Others	2,814	7.17

2000 Canadian federal election
Party	Candidate	Votes	%	±%
Liberal	Lucienne Robillard	23,209	60.23	+0.13
Progressive Conservative	Bryan Price	4,610	11.96	-5.42
Bloc Québécois	Marcela Valdivia	4,121	10.69	-0.62
New Democratic	Willy Blomme	2,001	5.19	-0.53
Alliance	Felix Cotte	1,706	4.43	
Green	Brian Sarwer-Foner	1,251	3.25	+1.57
Independent	Michel Laporte	696	1.81	
Marijuana	Patrice Caron	693	1.80	
Marxist–Leninist	Saroj Bains	151	0.39	+0.02
Natural Law	Allen Faguy	96	0.25	-0.22
Total valid votes		38,534	100.00	

1997 Canadian federal election
Party	Candidate	Votes	%
Liberal	Lucienne Robillard	26,972	60.10
Progressive Conservative	Tom Davis	7,802	17.39
Bloc Québécois	Bernard Guité	5,078	11.32
New Democratic	Chris Carter	2,566	5.72
Independent	Roopnarine Singh	1,328	2.96
Green	Brian Sarwer-Foner	751	1.67
Natural Law	Allen Faguy	212	0.47
Marxist–Leninist	Normand Chouinard	166	0.37
Total valid votes		44,875	100.00

== See also ==
- List of Canadian electoral districts
- Historical federal electoral districts of Canada
