= Fernand Leblanc =

Canadian politician

The Honourable Fernand-E. Leblanc
- Official 1974 portrait

Member of the Canadian Parliament for Laurier
- In office 1964–1979
- Preceded by: Lionel Chevrier
- Succeeded by: David Berger

Senator for Saurel, Quebec
- In office 1979–1992
- Preceded by: Alan Macnaughton
- Succeeded by: Fernand Roberge

Personal details
- Born: 1 July 1917 Montreal, Quebec
- Died: 8 January 1996 (aged 78)
- Party: Liberal
- Profession: chartered accountant

Fernand-E. Leblanc (1 July 1917 – 8 January 1996) was a Liberal party member of the House of Commons of Canada and then the Senate of Canada. He was born in Montreal, Quebec and became a chartered accountant by career. He was also a councillor for the municipality of Saint-Hippolyte, Quebec prior to entering federal politics.

He was first elected at the Laurier riding in a 10 February 1964 by-election, serving in the latter portion of the 26th Canadian Parliament. Leblanc was re-elected to consecutive terms at Laurier until 1979 when he was appointed to the Senate for the Saurel, Quebec division. Leblanc remained a senator until 1 July 1992.

Leblanc's funeral was held in Montreal on 12 January 1996.
