= Parti Montréal Ville-Marie =

- Active municipal party
- Leader: Louise O'Sullivan
- Founded: May 31, 2005
- Headquarters: 606, Cathcart Street, Suite 700; Montreal, Quebec; H3B 1K9
- Ideology: Fiscal conservatism
- Colours: Blue and Gold

Website
- www.partimontrealvillemarie.ca

Parti Montréal Ville-Marie was a municipal political party in the city of Montreal, Quebec, Canada. Led by its founder, Louise O'Sullivan, this political party was founded on May 31, 2005.

The party's priorities are stimulating economic development and improving public services such as snow removal and policing.

The party was dissolved and ceased to be recognized by the Directeur général des élections du Québec on May 11, 2015.
