= Don Johnston =

Canadian economist, lawyer and politician (1936–2022)

The Honourable Don Johnston PC OC QC
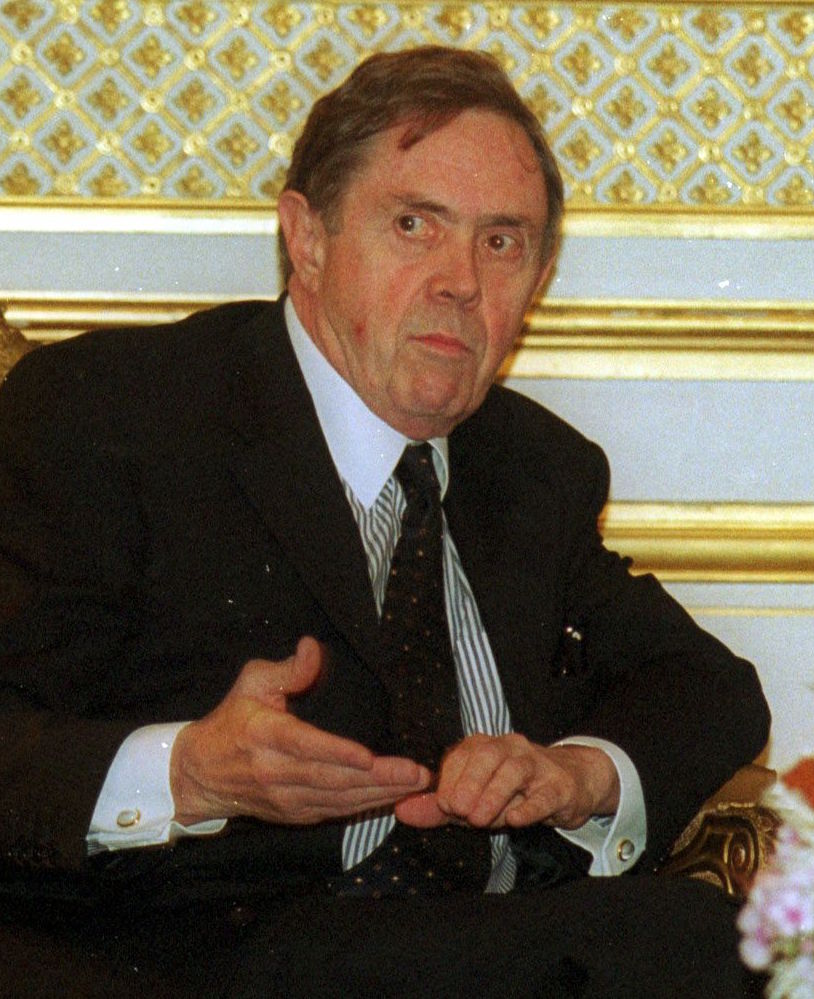
- Johnston in 2011

4th Secretary-General of the OECD
- In office June 1, 1996 – May 30, 2006
- Preceded by: Jean-Claude Paye
- Succeeded by: José Ángel Gurría

President of the Liberal Party of Canada
- In office June 23, 1990 – May 1994
- Preceded by: J. J. Michel Robert
- Succeeded by: Dan Hays

Minister of Justice Attorney General of Canada
- In office June 30, 1984 – September 16, 1984
- Prime Minister: John Turner
- Preceded by: Mark MacGuigan
- Succeeded by: John Crosbie

President of the Treasury Board
- In office March 3, 1980 – September 29, 1982
- Prime Minister: Pierre Trudeau
- Preceded by: Sinclair Stevens
- Succeeded by: Herb Gray

Member of Parliament for Saint-Henri—Westmount
- In office October 16, 1978 – November 20, 1988
- Preceded by: Charles Mills Drury
- Succeeded by: David Berger

Personal details
- Born: Donald James Johnston; June 26, 1936 Ottawa, Ontario, Canada
- Died: February 4, 2022 (aged 85) Cowansville, Quebec, Canada
- Party: Liberal (1978–1988, 1990–2022); Independent Liberal (1988)
- Spouse: Heather Bell Maclaren
- Children: 4 daughters
- Cabinet: Minister of Justice and Attorney General of Canada (1984); President of the Treasury Board (1980–1982); Minister of State for Economic and Regional Development (1983–1984); Minister of State for Economic Development (1982–1983); Minister of State for Science and Technology (1982–1984)
- Committees: Chair, Standing Committee on Public Accounts (1979)

Donald James Johnston, PC, OC, QC (June 26, 1936 – February 4, 2022) was a Canadian lawyer, writer and politician who was Secretary-General of the Organisation for Economic Co-operation and Development (OECD) from 1996 to 2006. He was the first non-European to head that organization. From 1978 to 1988, Johnston was a Liberal Party member of the Canadian parliament and served in the cabinets of prime ministers Pierre Trudeau and John Turner. In addition, he was the president of the Liberal Party of Canada from 1990 to 1994. Johnston was an Officer of the Order of Canada, and an Officer of the French National Order of the Legion of Honour.

== Early life ==
Johnston was born on June 26, 1936, in Ottawa, Ontario, to Florence (née Tucker) and Wilbur Johnston in a rural family with limited financial means. His father held multiple jobs, including serving as a flying officer during World War I and as a surveyor in Canada's north and in Alaska, before returning to Montreal to work as an athletics facilities supervisor at McGill University. Johnston attended the same university receiving his Bachelor of Arts degree before transferring to the university's Faculty of Law and graduating in 1958 with a faculty gold medal. In 1958, Johnston went on to pursue advanced studies in economics and political science in Grenoble.

== Career ==
=== Early legal career ===
In 1961, Johnston joined the Montreal-based law firm of Stikeman Elliott at the invitation of John Turner (who would later go on to become Canada's 17th prime minister), practicing business and tax law. He partnered with Roy Heenan in 1972 to found their own law firm. The duo would later be joined by Peter Blaikie and formed the Heenan Blaikie law firm. Johnston's work at this stage focused on taxation strategies, including the creation of tax shelters, serving as a key enabler for the Canadian film industry. During this time, between 1964 and 1977, he was also a lecturer in fiscal law at the McGill University Faculty of Law.

=== Political career ===
Johnston was first elected to the House of Commons of Canada in a 1978 by-election in Westmount in Montreal, Quebec, as a candidate of the Liberal Party of Canada. As a member of the cabinet of Prime Minister Pierre Trudeau from 1980 to 1984, Johnston successively held the positions of president of the Treasury Board, Minister of State for Science and Technology, and Minister of State for Economic and Regional Development.

When Trudeau announced his retirement in 1984, Johnston ran to succeed him as Liberal leader and prime minister in that year's Liberal leadership convention. Johnston came in third in a field of seven, behind John Turner and Jean Chrétien. Johnston served as Minister of Justice and Attorney General in the short-lived Turner government until its defeat in the 1984 federal election.

In opposition, Johnston and Turner split over the issue of the Canada-U.S. Free Trade Agreement and the Meech Lake Accord: in an attempt to boost his poll numbers and that of the divided Liberal caucus on those issues, Turner came out as outspoken opponent of free trade agreement and claimed that overturning what he labeled a sellout of the Canadian public to US interests was his life's work. Johnston was opposed to the Accord and for free trade, and on January 18, 1988, he resigned from the Liberal caucus to sit as an "Independent Liberal" until he retired from Parliament when the 1988 general election was called.

Johnston returned to the Liberal fold in 1990, after Turner's resignation as leader, and he served two terms as president of the Liberal Party of Canada from 1990 to 1994, seeing the party through its victory in the 1993 general election.

=== OECD ===
In 1994, the government of Prime Minister Jean Chrétien proposed Johnston for the position of secretary-general of the OECD. Johnston was elected to the post in November 1994 by the organization's member governments.

As the first non-European to occupy this prestigious position, Johnston began his mandate in 1996 and was elected to a second term in 2001. During his administration, the OECD represented 30 of the most advanced national economies and expanded its engagement to more than 70 non-members, with special country programs for Russia, China, Brazil and India.While the OECD is a forum for macroeconomic policy issues, it also deals with virtually all underlying structural issues including financial markets, trade and investment, taxation and corporate governance.

Under Johnston's stewardship, the OECD took the global lead in establishing the Principles of Corporate Governance (now the world standard) and revised the Guidelines for Multinational Enterprises, the bedrock of what is now known as corporate social responsibility. The Organisation also championed the correction of international harmful tax practices and the international harmonization of competition policy, while at the same time fostering sustainable development, which Johnston introduced to the OECD shortly after his arrival. He also created the Education Directorate which introduced the Program of International Student Assessment (PISA), now the leading reference for international educational comparisons.

OECD recommendations in these areas have been critical in enabling countries to structurally adapt to the challenges of globalization while maximizing its benefits to their economies.

Johnston stepped down from his position at the OECD on May 31, 2006.

=== Later career ===
In 2006, Johnston rejoined Heenan Blaikie as a member of the International Business Law Group (the firm was dissolved in 2014). He focused his practice on national and international business law, working with clients to expand their businesses in an increasingly complex and competitive global environment. He was a frequent speaker around the world, addressing a broad range of issues including climate change and energy initiatives.

== Personal life ==
Johnston was married to Heather (née Bell Maclaren). The couple had four daughters and four grandchildren. After retirement, the couple split their time between their houses in Quebec, another in Nova Scotia, and another in the south of France.

Johnston died in Quebec on February 4, 2022, at the age of 85.

== Awards and distinctions ==
In recognition of his accomplishments at the OECD, Johnston was awarded the Grand Cordon of the Order of the Rising Sun, the second most prestigious Japanese decoration and the highest one that can be bestowed on a non-Japanese citizen. He received the Grand-Croix de l’Ordre de Léopold II, one of the highest honorific distinctions in Belgium, given by royal decree and generally reserved for heads of state. He was also presented with the Commander's Cross with the Star of the Order of Merit of the Republic by the president of Hungary and the Order of the White Double Cross, First Class, by the president of the Slovak Republic.

In July 2008, Johnston was appointed as an Officer of the Order of Canada, in recognition of his contributions to public service in Canada as well as his achievements at the OECD. He was made an Officer of the National Order of the Legion of Honour in 2011.

He has also received several honorary doctorates – from McGill University, Bishop's University, University of King's College, McMaster University and the Economics University of Bratislava, Slovakia.

He was given the Canadian version of the Queen Elizabeth II Golden Jubilee Medal in 2002 and the Canadian version of the Queen Elizabeth II Diamond Jubilee Medal in 2012 for service to Canada.

Johnston was the chair of and an advisor to the McCall MacBain Foundation in Geneva. In addition, from 2006 until 2010, he was chairman of the International Risk Governance Council (IRGC) in Geneva. From 2006 to 2009, he was a distinguished visiting professor at Yonsei University in Seoul, South Korea, where he lectured on sustainable development.

== Musical composition ==
Montreal, composed by Donald Johnston (BCL ’58, BA ’60, LLD ’03); arranged, orchestrated and adapted by Marc Beaulieu (BMus ’80, MMus ’97); based on an earlier setting for piano and string quartet by Rafael Zaldivar (MMus ’10, DMus ‘17). Performed on October 18 and 19, 2019, in Pollack Hall by the McGill Symphony Orchestra and Artistic Director Alexis Hauser.

== Publications ==
- Johnston, Donald (2017). Missing the Tide Global Governments in Retreat (1st ed.). Montreal: McGill-Queen's University Press. ISBN 978-0-7735-4971-5.
- Johnston, Donald (1977). How to Survive Canada's Tax Chaos (3rd ed.). Montreal: PaperJacks Ltd. ISBN 978-0-7701-0016-2.
- Johnston, Donald (1988). With a Bang not a Whimper Pierre Trudeau Speaks Out Donald Johnston Editor. Toronto: Stoddart.
- Johnston, Donald (1986). Up The Hill (1st ed.). Montreal: Optimum Pub Intl. ISBN 9780888901781.
- Trudeau, Pierre (1989). Donald Johnston (ed.). Trudeau Parle (1st ed.). Montreal: Hurtubise HMH. ISBN 978-2890458666.

== Archives ==
There is a Donald James Johnston fonds at Library and Archives Canada.

Parliament of Canada
Preceded by Sinclair Stevens	President of the Treasury Board; 1980–1982	Succeeded by Herb Gray
Preceded by Mark MacGuigan	Minister of Justice; 1984	Succeeded by John Crosbie
