= Saint-Antoine—Westmount =

Former federal electoral district in Quebec, Canada

Quebec electoral district

Defunct federal electoral district
- Legislature: House of Commons
- District created: 1933
- District abolished: 1967
- First contested: 1935
- Last contested: 1965

St. Antoine—Westmount and Saint-Antoine—Westmount were federal electoral districts in Quebec, Canada, that were represented in the House of Commons of Canada from 1935 to 1968.

"St. Antoine—Westmount" riding was created in 1933 from parts of St. Antoine riding. It was abolished in 1952 when it was replaced by "Saint-Antoine—Westmount" riding.

Saint-Antoine—Westmount was abolished in 1966 when it was redistributed into Saint-Henri and Westmount ridings.

== Members of Parliament ==
This riding elected the following members of Parliament:

Parliament	Years	Member	Party
St. Antoine—Westmount; Riding created from St. Antoine
18th	1935–1940	Robert Smeaton White	Conservative
19th	1940–1945	Douglas Abbott	Liberal
20th	1945–1949	Douglas Abbott	Liberal
21st	1949–1953	Douglas Abbott	Liberal
Saint-Antoine—Westmount
22nd	1953–1954	Douglas Abbott	Liberal
22nd	1954–1957	George Carlyle Marler	Liberal
23rd	1957–1958	George Carlyle Marler	Liberal
24th	1958–1962	A. Ross Webster	Progressive Conservative
25th	1962–1963	Charles Drury	Liberal
26th	1963–1965	Charles Drury	Liberal
27th	1965–1968	Charles Drury	Liberal
Riding dissolved into Saint-Henri and Westmount

== Election results ==
=== St. Antoine—Westmount, 1935–1953 ===
1935 Canadian federal election
Party	Candidate	Votes
Conservative	Robert Smeaton White	12,905
Liberal	Shirley G. Dixon	7,222
Reconstruction	Albert A. Chesterfield	1,799

1940 Canadian federal election
Party	Candidate	Votes
Liberal	Douglas Abbott	14,879
National Government	Robert Smeaton White	8,972

1945 Canadian federal election
Party	Candidate	Votes
Liberal	Douglas Abbott	13,648
Progressive Conservative	Charles Basil Price	13,588
Co-operative Commonwealth	James Cyril Flanagan	1,982
Independent	Charles Stuart Cotton Wisdom	200

1949 Canadian federal election
Party	Candidate	Votes
Liberal	Douglas Abbott	21,399
Progressive Conservative	James Arthur De Lalanne	11,299

=== Saint-Antoine—Westmount, 1953–1968 ===
1953 Canadian federal election
Party	Candidate	Votes
Liberal	Douglas Abbott	14,441
Progressive Conservative	Egan Chambers	9,863
Co-operative Commonwealth	Gisèle Bergeron	504
Independent Liberal	Joseph Loder	253
Labor–Progressive	Louise Joslyn Harvey	216

By-election: on Mr. Abbott's acceptance of an office of emolument under the Crown, 1 July 1954

By-election on 8 November 1954
Party	Candidate	Votes
Liberal	George Carlyle Marler	13,960
Progressive Conservative	Egan Chambers	9,161
Labor–Progressive	Louise Harvey	224
Independent	Joseph Loader	133

1957 Canadian federal election
Party	Candidate	Votes
Liberal	George Carlyle Marler	14,485
Progressive Conservative	A. Ross Webster	11,802

1958 Canadian federal election
Party	Candidate	Votes
Progressive Conservative	A. Ross Webster	15,882
Liberal	George Carlyle Marler	12,941
Co-operative Commonwealth	Amédée Jasmin	684
Social Credit	J.-G.-Henri Naud	192

1962 Canadian federal election
Party	Candidate	Votes
Liberal	Charles Drury	13,973
Progressive Conservative	Peter Kerrigan	10,869
New Democratic	J. Edgar Assels	1,346
Social Credit	Del Hushley	702

1963 Canadian federal election
Party	Candidate	Votes
Liberal	Charles Drury	16,635
Progressive Conservative	Peter Kerrigan	7,223
New Democratic	Julien Major	2,227
Social Credit	Jacques Foster	1,338

1965 Canadian federal election
Party	Candidate	Votes
Liberal	Charles Drury	13,378
Progressive Conservative	G. B. Alex. Hutchison	6,343
New Democratic	Jeff Adams	3,241
Ralliement créditiste	Lucien Vallée	542

== See also ==
- List of Canadian electoral districts
- Historical federal electoral districts of Canada
