= Michael Kergin =

Canadian diplomat

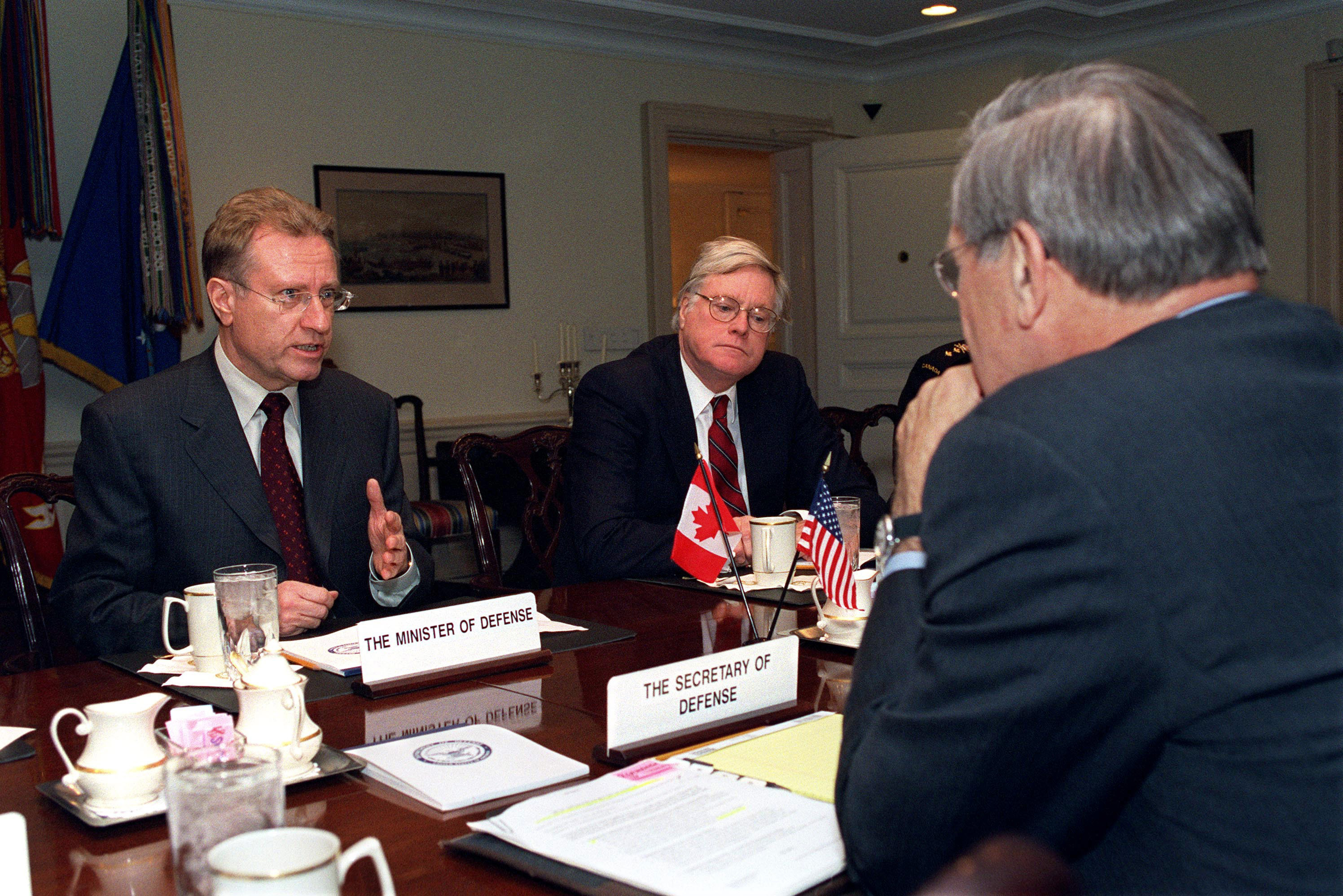
- Kergin (right)

Canadian Ambassador to the United States
- In office October 26, 2000 – February 28, 2005
- Prime Minister: Jean Chrétien; Paul Martin
- Preceded by: Raymond Chrétien
- Succeeded by: Frank McKenna

Canadian Ambassador to Cuba
- In office July 23, 1986 – July 9, 1989
- Prime Minister: Brian Mulroney
- Preceded by: Kenneth Bryce Williamson
- Succeeded by: Robert Morrice Middleton

Personal details
- Born: April 26, 1942 (age 84)
- Education: Trinity College, Toronto; Magdelen College, Oxford University

Michael Kergin (born April 26, 1942) is a Canadian career diplomat, who has been a member of the foreign service in some capacity since 1967, when he joined the Department of External Affairs.

== Education and career ==
Kergin graduated from the University of Trinity College in the University of Toronto in 1965, and received a degree from Magdelen College, Oxford University, in 1967. He served as the 19th Canadian ambassador to the United States of America from 26 October 2000 until 28 February 2005. Previously, he had been the Canadian ambassador to Cuba from 1986 to 1989.

Kergin is currently a senior fellow at the University of Ottawa’s Graduate School of Public and International Affairs. Previously, he served as an advisor to Ontario Premier Dalton McGuinty on international affairs.
