= Michael Dougall Bell =

Canadian diplomat

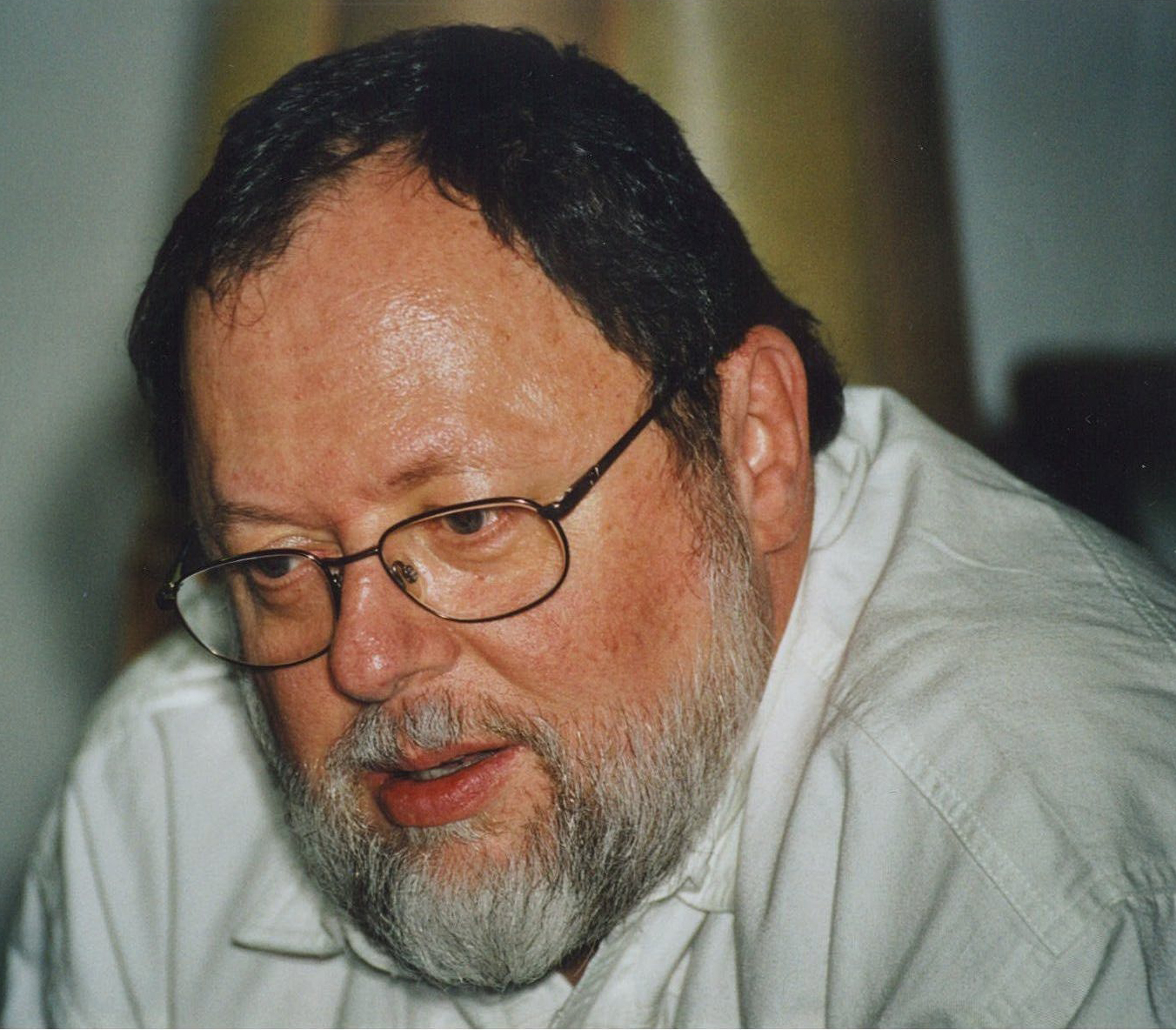

Canada Ambassador to Jordan
- In office 1987–1990
- Preceded by: Gary Richard Harman
- Succeeded by: Arthur Percy Sherwood

Canada Ambassador to Israel
- In office 1990–1992
- Preceded by: James Bartleman
- Succeeded by: Norman Spector

Canada Ambassador to Cyprus
- In office 1991–1992
- Preceded by: James Bartleman
- Succeeded by: Norman Spector

Canada Ambassador to Egypt
- In office 1994–1998
- Preceded by: Jacques T. Simard
- Succeeded by: Marie-Andrée Beauchemin

Canada Ambassador to Israel
- In office 1999–2003
- Preceded by: David Berger
- Succeeded by: Donald Sinclair

Personal details
- Born: September 10, 1943 Windsor, Ontario, Canada
- Died: August 24, 2017 (aged 73)
- Education: University of Windsor

Michael Dougall Bell (September 10, 1943 – August 24, 2017) was a Canadian Foreign Service Officer with 36 years experience in the Department of Foreign Affairs, mostly focused on the Middle East. He was Canada's Ambassador to Jordan (1987–90), Egypt (1994–98), and Israel (1990–92 and 1999–2003). He was also Chair of the Donor Committee of the International Reconstruction Fund Facility for Iraq.

== Early life ==
Bell was born on September 10, 1943, in Windsor, Ontario. He attended Assumption College School from 1958 to 1962, and later attended the University of Windsor. At Windsor he received his B.A. Hons (1966) and M.A. (1967) in Political Science and Economic Studies.

== Foreign Service ==
After completing his M.A. he joined the Canadian Foreign Service, holding early positions in Kingston, Jamaica (1968–1970), Port of Spain, Trinidad and Tobago (1970–1972), and Rome, Italy (1981–1983). He Also Served as the Senior Political Officer in Tel Aviv, Israel from 1975 to 1978. He was Executive Assistant for Middle East Affairs to the Honourable Robert Stanfield (1978–1979), and Director of the Middle East Relations Division (1983–1987), Director General for Central and Eastern Europe (1992–1994). He served as Canadian Ambassador to Egypt, Jordan and Israel (twice), as well as High Commissioner to Cyprus. He was also an Arms Inspector for UNSCOM for a short period.

== After the Foreign Service ==
Bell served as the Fellow at the Weatherhead Centre for International Affairs at Harvard University (1998–99) and from 2003 to 2005 he was Senior Scholar on Diplomacy at the Munk Centre for International Studies, at the University of Toronto. Afterwards, Bell joined the Norman Paterson School of International Affairs at Carleton University and the Paul Martin (Sr.) Senior Scholar in International Diplomacy, University of Windsor, where he taught until his death.

Bell has been a contributor to The Globe and Mail. He has also published in the Literary Review of Canada, the Behind the Headlines series of the Canadian Institute of International Affairs, Ideas: the Arts and Science Review of the University of Toronto, the International Journal, and the Journal of International Law and International Relations.

=== Later work ===
Michael Bell was the Paul Martin (Sr.) Senior Scholar on International Diplomacy at the University of Windsor, where he taught on the law and politics of the modern Middle East. He was also engaged in a major study on the future governance of Jerusalem's Old City. The project is designed to stimulate thinking amongst decision makers, respecting options for the future governance of the old city for possible use by negotiators, in the event of renewed negotiations for a comprehensive peace between Israelis and Palestinians. Critics note that this activity was detached from regional realities, "misguided" and unhelpful.

He died of liver cancer on 24 August 2017.

=== Political activity ===
Bell joined a Justin Trudeau initiative "to help him persuade voters he has the foreign policy chops to be prime minister in 2015", which was unveiled on 16 December 2014 in the lead-up to the 2015 Canadian election. The group of 14 experts included several candidates for office, a Calgary-based lawyer who advocates for Chinese state-owned enterprises, and another lawyer who wrote "lamenting the lack of diversity and women in positions of power in corporate Canada". In the months between the two events, he was interviewed on the P5+1 Iran deal and said:

It’s been clear for some time that Israeli intelligence did not agree with Netanyahu’s statements about Iran’s intentions. This revelation will now put Republicans in the U.S. and Netanyahu and his supporters in Israel on the defensive. What people need to remember is that Iran wants to be integrated into the international system. And I think we can trust the P5 countries to make sure any deal with Iran won’t allow it to develop nuclear weapons.

and he has written in The Globe and Mail pieces such as:

- "To respond to terror, we must distinguish its three varieties", 13 January 2015
- "Why a weakened IS gives Harper a political boost", 12 February 2015
- "Israel will pay a price for Netanyahu’s Iran obsession", 5 March 2015
- "Another round of Netanyahu – for Israelis and the world", 18 March 2015
- "Lost in the headlines: Another tragedy looms in Lebanon", 14 April 2015
- "Jordan needs more than muscle", 30 April 2015

Diplomatic posts
| Preceded by Gary Richard Harman | Ambassador Extraordinary and Plenipotentiary to Jordan; 1987-1990 | Succeeded by Arthur Percy Sherwood |
| Preceded by James Bartleman | Ambassador Extraordinary and Plenipotentiary to Israel; 1990-1992 | Succeeded by Norman Spector |
| Preceded by James Bartleman | High Commissioner to Cyprus; 1991-1992 | Succeeded by Norman Spector |
| Preceded by Jacques T. Simard | Ambassador Extraordinary and Plenipotentiary to Egypt; 1994-1998 | Succeeded by Marie-Andrée Beauchemin |
| Preceded by David Berger | Ambassador Extraordinary and Plenipotentiary to Israel; 1999-2003 | Succeeded by Donald Sinclair |
