= Lucienne Robillard =

Canadian politician (born 1945)

The Honourable Lucienne Robillard PC CM

President of the Queen's Privy Council for Canada
- In office July 20, 2004 – February 6, 2006
- Prime Minister: Paul Martin
- Preceded by: Denis Coderre
- Succeeded by: Michael Chong

Minister of Intergovernmental Affairs
- In office July 20, 2004 – February 6, 2006
- Prime Minister: Paul Martin
- Preceded by: Pierre Pettigrew
- Succeeded by: Michael Chong

Minister of Industry
- In office December 12, 2003 – July 19, 2004
- Prime Minister: Paul Martin
- Preceded by: Allan Rock
- Succeeded by: David Emerson

President of the Treasury Board
- In office August 3, 1999 – December 12, 2003
- Prime Minister: Jean Chrétien
- Preceded by: Marcel Massé
- Succeeded by: Reg Alcock

Minister of Citizenship and Immigration
- In office January 25, 1996 – August 2, 1999
- Prime Minister: Jean Chrétien
- Preceded by: Sergio Marchi
- Succeeded by: Elinor Caplan

Minister of Labour
- In office February 22, 1995 – January 24, 1996
- Prime Minister: Jean Chrétien
- Preceded by: Lloyd Axworthy
- Succeeded by: Alfonso Gagliano

Member of Parliament for Westmount—Ville-Marie (Saint-Henri—Westmount; 1995–1997)
- In office February 13, 1995 – January 25, 2008
- Preceded by: David Berger (1994)
- Succeeded by: Marc Garneau

Quebec Minister of Education
- In office October 29, 1992 – January 11, 1994
- Premier: Robert Bourassa
- Preceded by: Michel Pagé
- Succeeded by: Jacques Chagnon

Member of the National Assembly of Quebec for Chambly
- In office September 25, 1989 – September 12, 1994
- Preceded by: Gérard Latulippe
- Succeeded by: Louise Beaudoin

Personal details
- Born: June 16, 1945 (age 81) Montreal, Quebec, Canada
- Party: Liberal
- Profession: Social worker

Lucienne Robillard PC CM (French pronunciation: [lysjɛn ʁɔbijaʁ]; born June 16, 1945) is a Canadian retired politician of the Liberal Party. She sat in the House of Commons as the member of Parliament (MP) for the Quebec riding of Westmount—Ville-Marie in Montreal and held a number of ministerial positions under Jean Chrétien and Paul Martin.

Robillard had a career as a social worker before entering politics. In the Quebec election of 1989, she was elected to the National Assembly of Quebec in the riding of Chambly as a member of the Quebec Liberal Party. She was appointed to the provincial cabinet of Premier Robert Bourassa as Minister of Cultural Affairs. In 1992, she became Minister of Education, and then served as Minister of Health and Social Services from 1994 until the defeat of the Liberal government.

She then moved to federal politics as a star candidate when she was elected to the House of Commons of Canada in a by-election in the safe Liberal riding of Westmount—Ville-Marie. Jean Chrétien appointed her to the federal cabinet as Minister of Labour and Minister responsible for the federal campaign in the 1995 Quebec referendum.

In 1996, she became Minister of Citizenship and Immigration. On August 3, 1999, she assumed the responsibilities of President of the Treasury Board.

When Paul Martin became Prime Minister of Canada in 2003, he moved Robillard to the position of Minister of Industry and Minister of the Economic Development Agency of Canada for the Regions of Quebec. With the cabinet shuffle that followed the 2004 election, she became Minister of Intergovernmental Affairs and President of the Queen's Privy Council for Canada.

Upon Judy Sgro's resignation from Cabinet on January 14, 2005, Joe Volpe moved to fill the vacant position of Minister of Citizenship and Immigration, and Robillard assumed his prior responsibilities as Minister of Human Resources and Skills Development. When Belinda Stronach crossed the floor and joined the Liberals in the House of Commons on May 17, 2005, she replaced Robillard as Minister of Human Resources and Skills Development.

On February 1, 2006, she was named deputy leader of the Liberal Party in the House of Commons by Interim Leader Bill Graham. She held this post until the newly elected leader, Stéphane Dion (who represents the nearby riding of Saint-Laurent—Cartierville), in accordance with the customary Anglophone/Francophone division of duties, appointed the Anglophone Michael Ignatieff as his deputy.

On April 4, 2007, she announced she would not run in the next election. She resigned her seat on January 25, 2008.

In 2010 she became co-chair of the election campaign for the Liberal Party of Canada in Quebec. In May 2010 she was elected President of the Liberal Party of Canada (Quebec) (LPCQ) by the Board of directors to replace Marc Lavigne who had resigned for personal reasons a few months after having been elected by the delegates at the October 2009 convention. Lucienne Robillard was also co-chair of the Electoral Commission of the LPCQ in 2010 and 2011 until the commission was dissolved at the start of the 2011 electoral campaign.

As president of the LPCQ she also sits on the National Board of Directors of the Liberal Party of Canada.

== Electoral record ==
2006 Canadian federal election
Party	Candidate	Votes	%	±%	Expenditures
Liberal	Lucienne Robillard	18,884	45.68	-10.16	$70,313
Conservative	Louise O'Sullivan	7,295	17.65	+7.58	$27,009
New Democratic	Eric Wilson Steedman	6,356	15.37	+3.38	$13,082
Bloc Québécois	Sophie Frechette	5,191	12.56	-2.25	$9,770
Green	Julie Sabourin	3,451	8.35	+2.30	$122
Marxist–Leninist	Serge Lachapelle	94	0.23	*	$0
Communist	Bill Sloan	69	0.17	-0.09	$380
Total valid votes/Expense limit		41,340	100.00	$78,264	

2004 Canadian federal election
Party	Candidate	Votes	%	±%	Expenditures
Liberal	Lucienne Robillard	22,337	55.84	-4.39	$63,132
Bloc Québécois	Louis La Rochelle	5,922	14.81	+4.11	$10,025
New Democratic	Eric Wilson Steedman	4,795	11.99	+6.79	$5,379
Conservative	Robert Gervais	4,027	10.07	-6.32	$53,493
Green	Brian Sarwer-Foner	2,419	6.05	+2.80	$1,039
Marijuana	David John Proctor	396	0.99	-0.81	
Marxist–Leninist	Serge Lachapelle	103	0.26	-0.13	
Total valid votes/Expense limit		39,999	100.00	$78,247	

2000 Canadian federal election: Westmount—Ville-Marie
Party	Candidate	Votes	%	±%
Liberal	Lucienne Robillard (incumbent)	23,093	60.19	+0.09
Progressive Conservative	Bryan Price	4,597	11.98	-5.41
Bloc Québécois	Marcela Valdivia	4,110	10.71	-0.61
New Democratic	Willy Blomme	1,990	5.19	-0.53
Alliance	Felix Cotte	1,697	4.42	
Green	Brian Sarwer-Foner	1,245	3.25	+1.58
Independent	Michel Laporte	694	1.81	
Marijuana	Patrice Caron	692	1.80	
Marxist–Leninist	Saroj Bains	150	0.39	+0.02
Natural Law	Allen Faguy	96	0.25	-0.22
Total valid votes		38,364	100.00	
Total rejected ballots		331		
Turnout		38,695	54.65	-16.04
Electors on the lists		70,801		
Source: Official Results, Elections Canada.

1997 Canadian federal election: Westmount—Ville-Marie
Party	Candidate	Votes	%	±%	Expenditures
Liberal	Lucienne Robillard	26,972	60.10	–	$50,294
Progressive Conservative	Tom Davis	7,802	17.39		$33,542
Bloc Québécois	Bernard Guité	5,078	11.32		$18,518
New Democratic	Chris Carter	2,566	5.72		$4,050
Independent	Roopnarine Singh	1,328	2.96		$13,246
Green	Brian Sarwer-Foner	751	1.67		$967
Natural Law	Allen Faguy	212	0.47		$0
Marxist–Leninist	Normand Chouinard	166	0.37		$0
Total valid votes		44,875	100.00		
Total rejected ballots		569			
Turnout		45,444	70.69		
Electors on the lists		64,289			
Sources: Official Results, Elections Canada and official contributions and expenses submitted by the candidates, provided by Elections Canada.

Canadian federal by-election, February 13, 1995: Saint-Henri—Westmount
Party	Candidate	Votes	%	Expenditures
Liberal	Lucienne Robillard	12,675	75.91	$50,775
Bloc Québécois	Anne Michèle Meggs	2,357	14.12	$8,819
Progressive Conservative	Jay Gould	545	3.26	$19,236
Reform	Gaetan Morency	468	2.80	$27,429
New Democratic	Ann Elbourne	296	1.77	$1,259
Green	Gerald Glass	213	1.28	$2,080
Libertarian	Rick Blatter	64	0.38	$2,178
Marxist–Leninist	Arnold August	47	0.28	$0
Natural Law	Allen Faguy	32	0.19	$0
Total valid votes		16,697	100.00	
Total rejected ballots		100		
Turnout		16,797	31.62	
Electors on the lists		53,121		

1994 Quebec general election
Party	Candidate	Votes	%
Parti Québécois	Louise Beaudoin	19,800	48.86
Liberal	Lucienne Robillard	19,393	47.86
Natural Law	Michael Larmand	519	1.28
Development	Camille Bolté	474	1.17
Sovereignty	Pierre Mondor	336	0.83
Total valid votes		40,522	97.29
Total rejected ballots		1,130	2.71
Turnout		41,652	87.47
Electors on the lists		47,620	–

1989 Quebec general election
Party	Candidate	Votes	%
Liberal	Lucienne Robillard	15,435	48.62
Parti Québécois	Monique Richer	12,939	40.76
Green	Jocelyne Décary	2,797	8.81
Parti indépendantiste	Henri Laflamme	572	1.80
Total valid votes		31,743	96.69
Total rejected ballots		1,087	3.31
Turnout		32,830	80.37
Electors on the lists		40,847	–

Party political offices
Preceded by Sheila Copps	Deputy Leader of the Liberal Party of Canada; 2006	Succeeded by Michael Ignatieff
Political offices
Preceded by Michel Pagé	Quebec Minister of Education; 1992–1994	Succeeded by Jacques Chagnon
27th Canadian Ministry (2003–2006) – Cabinet of Paul Martin
Cabinet posts (4)
Predecessor	Office	Successor
Pierre Pettigrew	Minister of Intergovernmental Affairs; 2004–2006	Michael Chong
Denis Coderre	President of the Queen's Privy Council for Canada; 2004–2006	Michael Chong
Joe Volpe	Minister of State; 2005 styled as Minister of Human Resources and Skills Development	Belinda Stronach
Allan Rock	Minister of Industry; 2003–2004	David Emerson
Special Cabinet Responsibilities
Predecessor	Title	Successor
vacant, previously Brian Tobin	Minister responsible for the Economic Development; Agency of Canada for the Regions of Quebec; 2003–2004	position abolished
26th Canadian Ministry (1993–2003) – Cabinet of Jean Chrétien
Cabinet posts (4)
Predecessor	Office	Successor
Marcel Massé	President of the Treasury Board; 1999–2003	Reg Alcock
Sergio Marchi	Minister of Citizenship and Immigration; 1996–1999	Elinor Caplan
Sergio Marchi	Secretary of State for Canada; 1996 styled as Minister of Citizenship and Immigration	position abolished
Lloyd Axworthy	Minister of Labour; 1995–1996	Alfonso Gagliano
