= A. Ross Webster =

Canadian politician

Ross Webster

Member of Parliament for Saint-Antoine—Westmount
- In office March 1958 – June 1962
- Preceded by: George Marler
- Succeeded by: Charles Drury

Personal details
- Born: Allan Ross Webster; 24 March 1903 Duluth, Minnesota, United States
- Died: 3 January 1988 (aged 84)
- Party: Progressive Conservative
- Profession: Importer, merchant

Allan Ross Webster (24 March 1903 – 3 January 1988) was a Canadian businessman and politician. Webster was a Progressive Conservative party member of the House of Commons of Canada. He was born in Duluth, Minnesota, United States and became an importer and merchant by career.

After an unsuccessful attempt to win the Saint-Antoine—Westmount riding in the 1957 general election, Webster won the riding in the following year's election. After completing his only federal term, the 24th Canadian Parliament, Webster left office and did not campaign for another federal election.
