= David Berger (Canadian politician) =

Canadian politician (born 1950)

Member of the Canadian Parliament for Laurier
- In office 1979–1988
- Preceded by: Fernand-E. Leblanc
- Succeeded by: District was abolished in 1987

Member of the Canadian Parliament for Saint-Henri—Westmount
- In office 1988–1994
- Preceded by: Don Johnston
- Succeeded by: Lucienne Robillard

Personal details
- Born: March 30, 1950 (age 76) Ottawa, Ontario
- Party: Liberal
- Relations: Sam Berger (father)

David Berger (born March 30, 1950) is a Canadian lawyer, politician, diplomat, and sports executive.

He was born in Ottawa, Ontario, the eldest son of Sam Berger. He attended Ashbury College before receiving a Bachelor of Arts degree in 1971 from the University of Toronto and a Bachelor of Civil Law in 1975 from McGill University. From 1975 to 1979, he was an Executive Vice-president for the Montreal Alouettes Football Club. From 1978 to 1979, he was President of the Canadian Football League. He was elected to the House of Commons of Canada for the riding of Laurier in the 1979 federal election. A Liberal, he was re-elected four more times in 1980, 1984, 1988, and 1993 (in the riding of Saint-Henri—Westmount). In 1982, he was the Parliamentary Secretary to the Minister of State (Small Businesses and Tourism). From 1982 to 1984, he was the Parliamentary Secretary to the Minister of Consumer and Corporate Affairs. He resigned in 1994 after being appointed the Canadian ambassador to Israel and was at the same time High Commissioner of Canada to Cyprus. Berger served until 1999 and was replaced by Michael Dougall Bell. He backed Stéphane Dion at the 2006 Liberal Party of Canada leadership convention.

== Electoral record (partial) ==
1993 Canadian federal election: Saint-Henri—Westmount
Party	Candidate	Votes	%	Expenditures
Liberal	David Berger	25,940	61.72	$46,505
Bloc Québécois	Eugenia Romain	7,950	18.92	$10,686
Progressive Conservative	Alain Perez	4,507	10.72	$43,910
New Democratic Party	Ann Elbourne	1,662	3.95	$2,453
National	Louise Pilon	581	1.38	$1,697
Natural Law	Allan Faguy	558	1.33	$20,006
Non-Affiliated	Mark E.A. Roper	259	0.62	$1,672
Commonwealth	Normand Bélanger	131	0.31	$0
Christian Heritage	Robert Adams	125	0.30	$38
Independent	Rudolph Scalzo	122	0.29	$1,282
Marxist–Leninist	Arnold August	114	0.27	$80
Abolitionist	Robert Carlisle	80	0.19	$0
Total valid votes		42,029	100.00	
Total rejected ballots		867		
Turnout		42,896	74.61	
Electors on the lists		57,491		
Source: Thirty-fifth General Election, 1993: Official Voting Results, Published by the Chief Electoral Officer of Canada. Financial figures taken from official contributions and expenses provided by Elections Canada.

1984 Canadian federal election: Laurier
Party	Candidate	Votes	%
Liberal	David Berger	9,302	34.58
Progressive Conservative	Roland Gagné	7,720	28.70
New Democratic	Jean-Pierre Juneau	4,595	17.08
Rhinoceros	François Yo Gourd	3,247	12.07
Parti nationaliste	Jean Saint-Amour	906	3.37
Green	Robert Silverman	751	2.79
Social Credit	Gilles Côté	194	0.72
Communist	Brian O'Keefe	130	0.48
Commonwealth of Canada	Jean Langevin	53	0.20
Total valid votes		26,898	100.00
Total rejected ballots		460	
Turnout		27,358	67.89
Electors on the lists		40,299	
Source: Report of the Chief Electoral Officer, Thirty-third General Election, 1984.

Diplomatic posts
Preceded by Norman Spector	Canadian Ambassador to Israel; 1995–1999	Succeeded by Michael Dougall Bell
