= Gary Richard Harman =

Canadian diplomat (1929–2012)

Canadian Ambassador Extraordinary and Plenipotentiary to Lebanon
- In office 14 May 1990 – 9 August 1990
- Monarch: Elizabeth II
- Prime Minister: Brian Mulroney
- Preceded by: Haig Edouard Sarafian (As Chargé d'Affaires)
- Succeeded by: David Martin Collacott

10th Canadian Ambassador Extraordinary and Plenipotentiary to Syria
- In office 13 July 1987 – 9 August 1990
- Monarch: Elizabeth II
- Prime Minister: Brian Mulroney
- Preceded by: Jacques Noiseux
- Succeeded by: David Martin Collacott

8th Canadian Ambassador Extraordinary and Plenipotentiary to Jordan
- In office 7 August 1985 – 9 July 1987
- Monarch: Elizabeth II
- Prime Minister: Brian Mulroney
- Preceded by: Keith William MacLellan
- Succeeded by: Michael Dougall Bell

Canadian Ambassador Extraordinary and Plenipotentiary to Cuba
- In office 14 July 1977 – 21 June 1981
- Monarch: Elizabeth II
- Prime Minister: Pierre Trudeau; Joe Clark; Pierre Trudeau
- Preceded by: James Edward Hyndman
- Succeeded by: James Karl Bartleman

Chargé d'Affaires at the Canadian Embassy in Egypt
- In office 29 December 1970 – 1 August 1971
- Monarch: Elizabeth II
- Preceded by: Thomas Lemesurier Carter (As Ambassador Extraordinary and Plenipotentiary)
- Succeeded by: David Stansfield (As Ambassador Extraordinary and Plenipotentiary)

Personal details
- Born: 14 April 1929 Winnipeg, Manitoba, Canada
- Died: 24 July 2012 (aged 83) Ottawa, Ontario, Canada
- Spouse: Margaret Siddall
- Children: 3
- Education: University of Manitoba
- Occupation: Diplomat

Gary Richard Harman (14 April 1929 – 24 July 2012) was a Canadian diplomat. Over a career in the Canadian Foreign Service, he represented Canada in various international postings, including ambassadorships to Cuba, Jordan, Syria, and Lebanon.

== Early life and education ==
Harman was born on 14 April 1929 in Winnipeg, Manitoba, to the owner of Harman's Drug Store, a community centre during the Great Depression.

He attended Gordon Bell High School, earning the Governor General's Medal upon graduation in 1947.

During his youth, he pursued music, obtaining an Associate of the Royal Schools of Music in 1946 and a Licentiate of the Royal Schools of Music in 1948.

Harman attended the University of Manitoba, where he earned a Bachelor of Arts (Honours) in History in 1950. His talent as a pianist led to recordings of works by Grieg, Debussy, Rachmaninoff, and Chopin between 1946 and 1962.

== Career ==
Harman began his professional career in the Department of Trade and Commerce before joining the United Nations International Intern Program in New York City in 1952. He married Margaret Siddall in 1954, and the couple started an international career in diplomacy.

From 1970 to 1971, Harman served as Chargé d'Affaires at the Canadian Embassy in Egypt. He later held the following positions:

- Ambassador to Cuba (1977–1981)
- Ambassador to Jordan (1985–1987)
- Ambassador to Syria (1987–1990)
- Ambassador to Lebanon (May–August 1990), concurrently accredited while resident in Syria.

Harman retired in 1993 and settled in Ottawa.

== Personal life ==
Harman was married to Margaret Siddall for 58 years. Together, they had three children: Lesley, Edward, and Katherine, as well as several grandchildren. Harman developed fluency in French, Russian, Polish, Czech, Arabic, Spanish, and German.

A lover of the arts, Harman supported opera, ballet, theatre, and orchestra. He was an active member of the United Church of Canada.

== Death ==
Gary Harman died of natural causes on 24 July 2012 in Ottawa at the age of 83. His funeral was held at MacKay United Church on 28 July 2012.
