= Lucie Edwards =

Canadian diplomat

- Born: 1954 (age 71–72); Ottawa, Ontario, Canada
- Occupations: diplomat, academic
- Known for: her mission's humanitarian work during the civil war in Rwanda;

Lucie Edwards is a Canadian diplomat, who worked in the Department of Foreign Affairs, Trade and Development from 1976 to 2009, as the high commissioner to India, South Africa, Kenya and permanent representative to the United Nations Environmental program. She founded the Global Issues Bureau and served as assistant deputy minister for Corporate Services in Ottawa.

Edwards received the Public Service Award of Excellence in 1995 for her humanitarian work during the Rwandan genocide and was awarded the Lifetime Achievement Award of Excellence from the Department of Foreign Affairs in 2009. Lucie Edwards has over 20 years of experience representing Canada at the United Nations and regional development agencies. Her interests include good governance, food security, poverty alleviation, primary health care and sustainable development. She was the Ashley Fellow 2011 at Trent University.

== Early life and education ==
Edwards was born in Ottawa, Ontario. She was a contestant on Reach for the Top and valedictorian of her graduating class at Laurentian High School in Ottawa, Ontario.

In recognition of exceptional academic and extracurricular achievement, she was a recipient of the prestigious Champlain Scholarship at Trent University in Peterborough, Ontario. She earned a Bachelor of Arts Economics and History Honours, from Trent University in 1976. She took the Foreign Affairs Officer's exam initially because she thought it would be good practice for the law school entrance exam. She accepted a job offer on the Middle East desk at the Department of External now Foreign Affairs in 1976. She earned a master's degree in Public Administration from Harvard Kennedy School. In 1984. Lucie Edwards married Thomas Roach (BA, Trent University, 1970) in 1979.

== Career ==
As a Canadian public servant and diplomat, Edwards has held various roles. In 1976, Lucie Edwards was one of five women who joined the Department of External Affairs (DEA), now the Department of Foreign Affairs and International Trade. Throughout her career, she has specialized on African and Middle Eastern affairs.

From 1977 to 1980, Edwards was assigned to the Middle East division at the embassy in Israel and helped develop a Canadian studies program in Israel. She was then transferred to the Lebanon desk from 1982 to 1984.

From 1989 to 1992, she became the chairperson of the Southern Africa Task Force and from 1992 to 1993, the director of the Middle East Relations Division.

Edwards became the High Commissioner to Kenya (with concurrent accreditation to Uganda, Rwanda, Burundi, Eritrea and Somalia) from 1993 to 1995 and was also the Permanent Representative to United Nations Environment Programme and United National Human Settlements Programme UN/Habitat. She also chaired the Donors' Development Group, in collaboration with the government of Kenya.

In 1995, Ewards was the Founding Director General of the Global Issues Bureau which provided policy direction on human rights, peace building, environment and human development.

From 1996 to 1999, she became the Assistant Deputy Minister, Corporate Services of the Department of Foreign Affairs.

From 1999 to 2003, Ewards was the High Commissioner of Canada to South Africa, with concurrent accreditation to Namibia, Lesotho, Swaziland and Mauritius. She was also the Chairperson of the World Agroforestry Centre (ICRAF) and served as an adviser on rural development for International Agricultural Research.

From 2003 to 2006, Ewards was the High Commissioner in the Republic of India, with concurrent accreditation as Ambassador to the Kingdom of Nepal and the Kingdom of Bhutan.

From 2007 to 2009, Ewards was the Internal Management Consultant, Chief Strategist and Head of the Office of Transformation, Department of Foreign Affairs with a mandate to "reinvent Canada’s foreign and trade ministry for the twenty-first century."

== Honours ==
Edwards was awarded the 2009 Award of Excellence—Lifetime Achievement Award for her career in the Foreign Service. In 1995, Edwards received the Public Service Award of Excellence, the Public Service's highest award, for her mission's humanitarian work during the civil war in Rwanda. She received the Merit Award, 1994 for consular operations in Rwanda, Department of Foreign Affairs.

She was awarded the Merit Award, 1989 for human rights work in South Africa, Department of Foreign Affairs.

She was the Ashley Fellow at Trent University 2011/12 where she served as a "diplomat in residence" and spoke to classes in Environmental Resource Science / Studies, International Development Studies, Politics, and Economics.

== Select publications ==
- "We are Dust: Human Security and the San People of Southern Africa" Human Security Conference University of Toronto/University of Waterloo December 2009.
- "Canadian Foreign Policy Towards Africa", South African Yearbook of International Affairs, South African Institute of International Affairs, 2001.
- "Day 58 of the Rwanda Crisis", Bout de Papier, Vol. 12, 1995.
- "Freedom is Rising", Musicworks, No. 43.
- "Resource Development in Labrador", Alternatives 1977.
