= Pietro Rizzuto =

Canadian politician

The Honourable Pietro Rizzuto

Senator for Repentigny, Quebec
- In office December 23, 1976 – August 3, 1997
- Appointed by: Pierre Trudeau
- Preceded by: J.-Eugène Lefrançois
- Succeeded by: Marisa Ferretti Barth

Personal details
- Born: March 18, 1934 Cattolica Eraclea, Sicily, Italy
- Died: August 3, 1997 (aged 63) Montreal, Quebec, Canada
- Party: Liberal

Pietro Rizzuto (Italian: [ˈpjɛːtro ritˈtsuːto]; March 18, 1934 – August 3, 1997) was an Italian-born Canadian politician.

Born in Cattolica Eraclea, Sicily, he came to Canada at the age of 20. In 1963, he founded Inter State Paving Inc., a construction company.

In 1976, he was appointed to the Senate of Canada by Pierre Trudeau representing the senatorial division of Repentigny, Quebec. He was the first Canadian of Italian origin to be appointed to the Senate.

He was made a Grand Official of the Order of Merit of the Italian Republic.

He was married to Pina and had three children: Melina, Alfonso, and Maria Christina. He died in Montreal in 1997.
