= Saint-Henri—Westmount =

Former federal electoral district in Quebec, Canada

Quebec electoral district

Defunct federal electoral district
- Legislature: House of Commons
- District created: 1966
- District abolished: 1996
- First contested: 1968
- Last contested: 1993

Saint-Henri—Westmount (formerly known as Westmount) was a federal electoral district in Quebec, Canada, that was represented in the House of Commons of Canada from 1968 to 1997.

"Saint-Henri" was created in 1966 from parts of Mount Royal, Notre-Dame-de-Grâce, Outremont—St-Jean, Saint-Antoine—Westmount, and St. Lawrence—St. George ridings.

In 1978, it was renamed "Saint-Henri—Westmount". In 1996, it was abolished when it was merged into LaSalle—Émard riding.

== Members of Parliament ==
This riding elected the following members of Parliament:

Parliament	Years	Member	Party
Westmount; Riding created from Mount Royal, Notre-Dame-de-Grâce, Outremont—St-Jean, Saint-Antoine—Westmount and St. Lawrence—St. George
28th	1968–1972	Charles Drury	Liberal
29th	1972–1974	Charles Drury	Liberal
30th	1974–1978	Charles Drury	Liberal
30th	1978–1979	Don Johnston	Liberal
Saint-Henri—Westmount
31st	1979–1980	Don Johnston	Liberal
32nd	1980–1984	Don Johnston	Liberal
33rd	1984–1988	Don Johnston	Liberal
34th	1988–1993	David Berger	Liberal
35th	1993–1994	David Berger	Liberal
35th	1995–1997	Lucienne Robillard	Liberal
Riding dissolved into LaSalle—Émard and Westmount—Ville-Marie

== Election results ==
=== Westmount ===
1968 Canadian federal election
Party	Candidate	Votes
Liberal	Charles Drury	31,104
Progressive Conservative	Murray G. Ballantyne	5,928
New Democratic	Jeff Adams	2,303

1972 Canadian federal election
Party	Candidate	Votes
Liberal	Charles Drury	24,049
Progressive Conservative	Michael Meighen	10,551
New Democratic	Bob Keaton	5,171
Not affiliated	Peter Foster	293

1974 Canadian federal election
Party	Candidate	Votes
Liberal	Charles Drury	20,816
Progressive Conservative	Michael Meighen	11,575
New Democratic	Peter P. Berlow	3,140
Social Credit	Joseph Ranger	412
Marxist–Leninist	Lawrence Tansey	190

Canadian federal by-election, October 16, 1978
Party	Candidate	Votes
Liberal	Don Johnston	17,214
Progressive Conservative	Bernard J. Finestone	9,391
New Democratic	Claude de Mestral	1,817
Independent	A. Léo Larocque	305

=== Saint-Henri—Westmount ===
1979 Canadian federal election
Party	Candidate	Votes
Liberal	Don Johnston	31,486
Progressive Conservative	Bernard Finestone	6,374
New Democratic	Claude Demestral	3,297
Social Credit	Henri C. Pomerleau	1,376
Rhinoceros	André Nono Martineau	957
Libertarian	William McDonald	185
Marxist–Leninist	Robert Couture	175
Union populaire	Robert Gervais	145

1980 Canadian federal election
Party	Candidate	Votes
Liberal	Don Johnston	24,907
Progressive Conservative	Claude Dupras	6,669
New Democratic	Claude de Mestral	3,766
Rhinoceros	Jean-Guy Montpetit	1,140
Libertarian	Robert Champlin	196
Marxist–Leninist	Robert Couture	114
Not affiliated	Benoît Michaudville	113

1984 Canadian federal election
Party	Candidate	Votes
Liberal	Don Johnston	18,244
Progressive Conservative	Bertrand Laforte	14,168
New Democratic	John H. Thompson	5,889
Rhinoceros	Laurent Arthur Alie	1,289
Parti nationaliste	Luc Richard	653
Commonwealth of Canada	Harold Quesnel	38

1988 Canadian federal election
Party	Candidate	Votes
Liberal	David Berger	16,600
Progressive Conservative	Keith MacLellan	15,673
New Democratic	Ruth Rose	5,235
Green	Brian McLoughlin	900
Rhinoceros	John McGill Jagiellowicz	671
Not affiliated	Frank Auf der Maur	402
Not affiliated	Pierre Chénier	184
Libertarian	Joyce Willert	170
Not affiliated	Richard H. Gaunt	60

1993 Canadian federal election
Party	Candidate	Votes
Liberal	David Berger	24,592
Bloc Québécois	Eugenia Romain	7,364
Progressive Conservative	Alain Perez	5,834
New Democratic	Ann Elbourne	1,607
National	Louise Pilon	565
Natural Law	Allan Faguy	535
Independent	Mark Edward Anderson Roper	245
Commonwealth of Canada	Normand Bélanger	126
Christian Heritage	Robert Adams	121
Independent	Rudolph Scalzo	118
Marxist–Leninist	Arnold August	105
Abolitionist	Robert Carlisle	76

By-election: Resignation of David Berger, 28 December 1994

By-election on 13 February 1995
Party	Candidate	Votes
Liberal	Lucienne Robillard	12,675
Bloc Québécois	Anne Michèle Meggs	2,357
Progressive Conservative	Jay Gould	545
Reform	Gaetan Morency	468
New Democratic	Ann Elbourne	296
Green	Gerald Glass	213
Libertarian	Rick Blatter	64
Marxist–Leninist	Arnold August	47
Natural Law	Allen Faguy	32

== See also ==
- List of Canadian electoral districts
- Historical federal electoral districts of Canada
