= Afghanistan–Canada relations =

- Afghanistan: Canada

Diplomatic mission
- Afghan Embassy, Ottawa: Afghanistan Unit at the Canadian Embassy Doha, Qatar

Envoy
- Ambassador Hassan Soroosh: Special Representative David Sproule

Afghanistan and Canada established diplomatic relations in 1968. In 2003, Canada opened its embassy in Kabul and appointed its first resident ambassador. Afghanistan appointed its first resident ambassador to Canada in 2002. In August 2021, Canada closed its embassy in Kabul with the return of the Taliban to power in Afghanistan. Since the 2021 Taliban takeover, the Islamic Republic of Afghanistan's embassy in Ottawa continues to be served by diplomats representing the former government.

== History ==
=== Beginning ===
Official relations between Afghanistan and Canada did not occur immediately, but developed over time. Canadians involvement in Afghanistan dates back to the 1960s, with the creation of the first Canadian development assistance program to Afghanistan. As the need for greater coordination of efforts by development agencies working there grew, the Government of Canada decided to establish full diplomatic relations with Afghanistan in 1968.

In 1971, Canadian aid to Afghanistan included 257,000 bushels of wheat, after drought had reduced production of cereal crops in the Central Asian country.

=== Soviet–Afghan War ===
The Soviet–Afghan War in 1979 and the installation of an authoritarian regime in Afghanistan led Canada to sever diplomatic ties. Even after the Soviet withdrawal from Afghanistan in 1989, the two countries did not re-establish full diplomatic relations, and contact was minimal despite humanitarian aid efforts by Canada in the 1990s.

=== Taliban period ===
The Taliban took control of Afghanistan in 1996. Canada became an outspoken critic of the Taliban's human rights abuses against the citizens of Afghanistan. Canada continued to provide humanitarian aid to the country despite Taliban restrictions on aid agencies.

=== War in Afghanistan ===
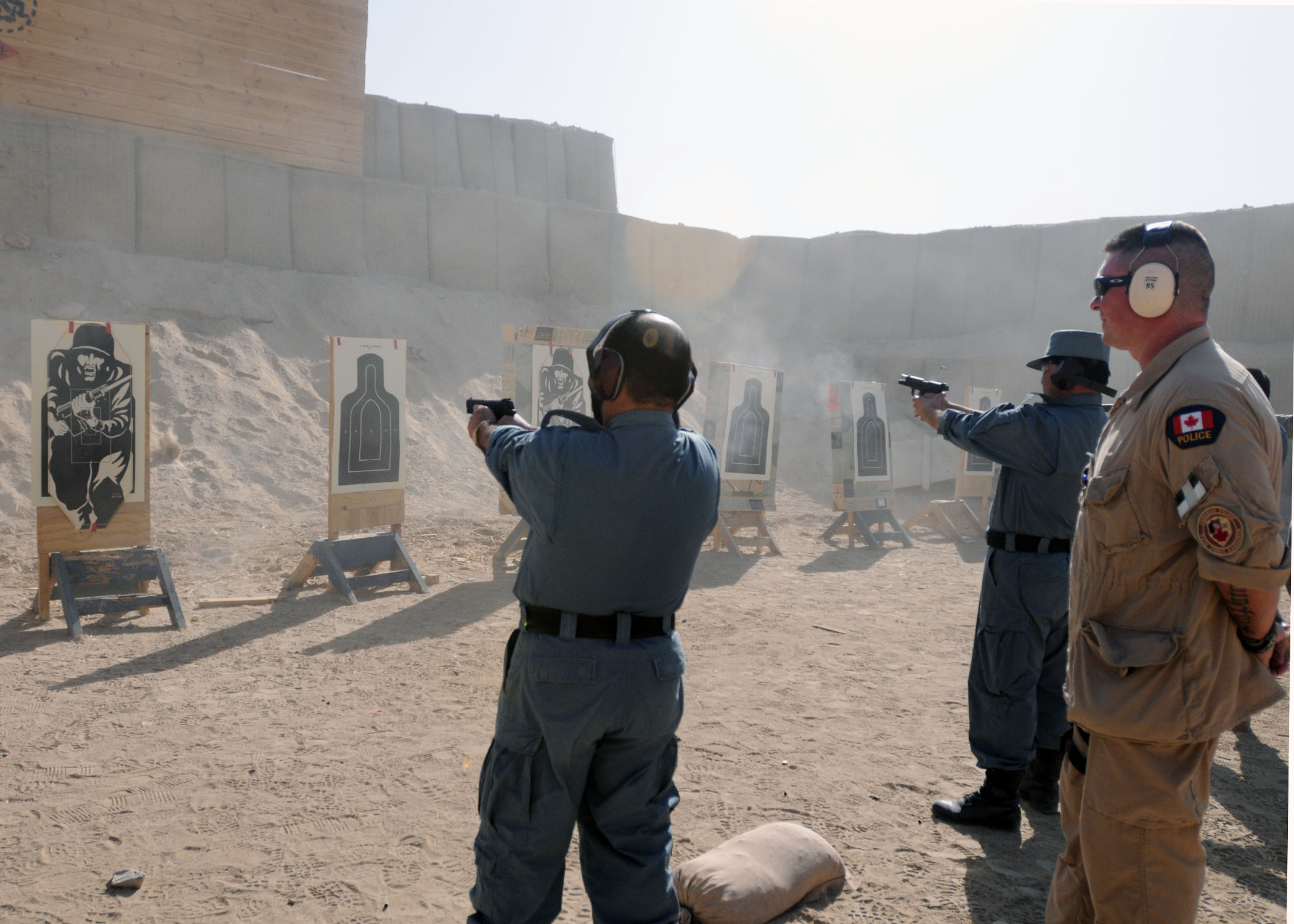
Constable Lorant Haged, Royal Canadian Mounted Police and instructor at the leadership and management course, observes ANP as they shot at targets on a 9mm familiarization range Dec. 3. The ANP are attending a six-month Leadership and Management course that will focus on teaching them to run more efficient police sub-stations.

The September 11, 2001 terrorist attacks prompted Canada to re-evaluate its policies toward Afghanistan. The Minister of National Defence Art Eggleton authorized more than 100 Canadian Forces (CF) members serving on military exchange programs in the United States and other countries to participate in the War in Afghanistan. On October 7, Prime Minister Jean Chrétien announced that Canada had launched Operation Apollo, contributing expanded CF personnel and equipment to the international force being formed to conduct a campaign against terrorism. The Canadian commitment was originally planned to last to October 2003.

Canada re-established diplomatic relations with Afghanistan on January 25, 2002.

== Diplomatic relationships ==
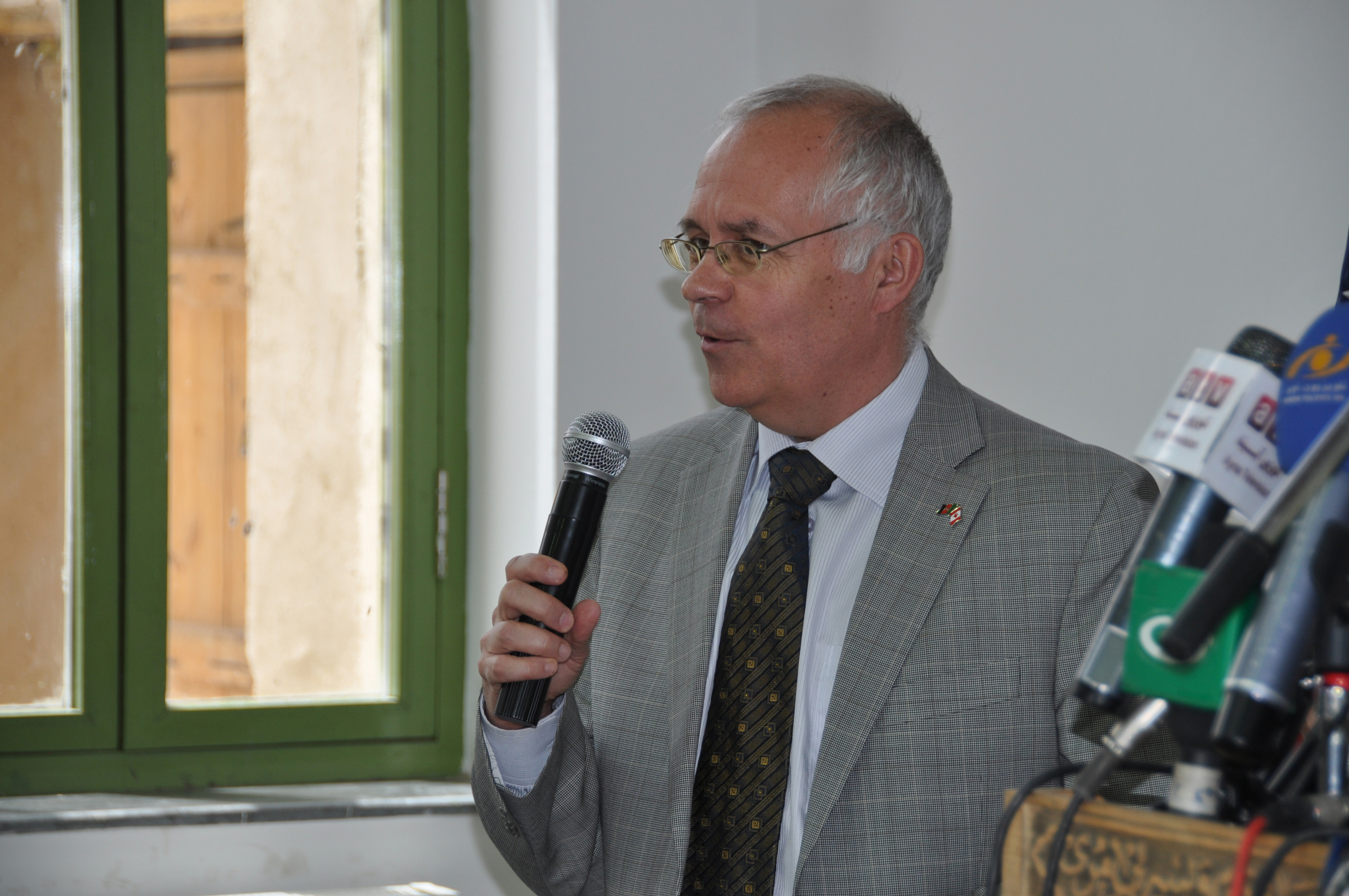
Former Canadian Ambassador William Crosbie makes remarks during the opening of the refurbished Turquoise Mountain Foundation in Kabul on May 9, 2011.

Canada has an embassy in Kabul. In July 2009, an agreement on handing over of eight acre land by the Afghan government to Canadian embassy was signed in Kabul by the Afghan Minister of Foreign Affairs (Rangeen Dadfar Spanta) and the Canadian ambassador (Ron Hoffmann). As of 2024, the last Canadian ambassador appointed to the Canadian Embassy in Kabul was Reid Sirrs, who left in late 2020 when the embassy temporarily suspended operations due to safety concerns in the lead-up to the Taliban breaching of the capital in 2021. In October 2022, Canada resumed a level of diplomatic operations when David Sproule was appointed Special Representative of Canada in Afghanistan.

The Islamic Republic of Afghanistan has an embassy in Ottawa and a consulate in Toronto. Ambassador Jawed Ludin completed his assignment in Ottawa in December 2010 and the position was filled by Barna Karimi in March 2012. The current ambassador, representing the former government of the Islamic Republic of Afghanistan, is career diplomat Hassan Soroosh; the embassy in Canada, like the few others still operating on behalf of the former republic, are operating on a significantly reduced budget, funded by the limited revenue from fees for providing consular services.

== Resident diplomatic missions ==
=== Embassy of Afghanistan, Ottawa ===
Embassy of Afghanistan in Ottawa
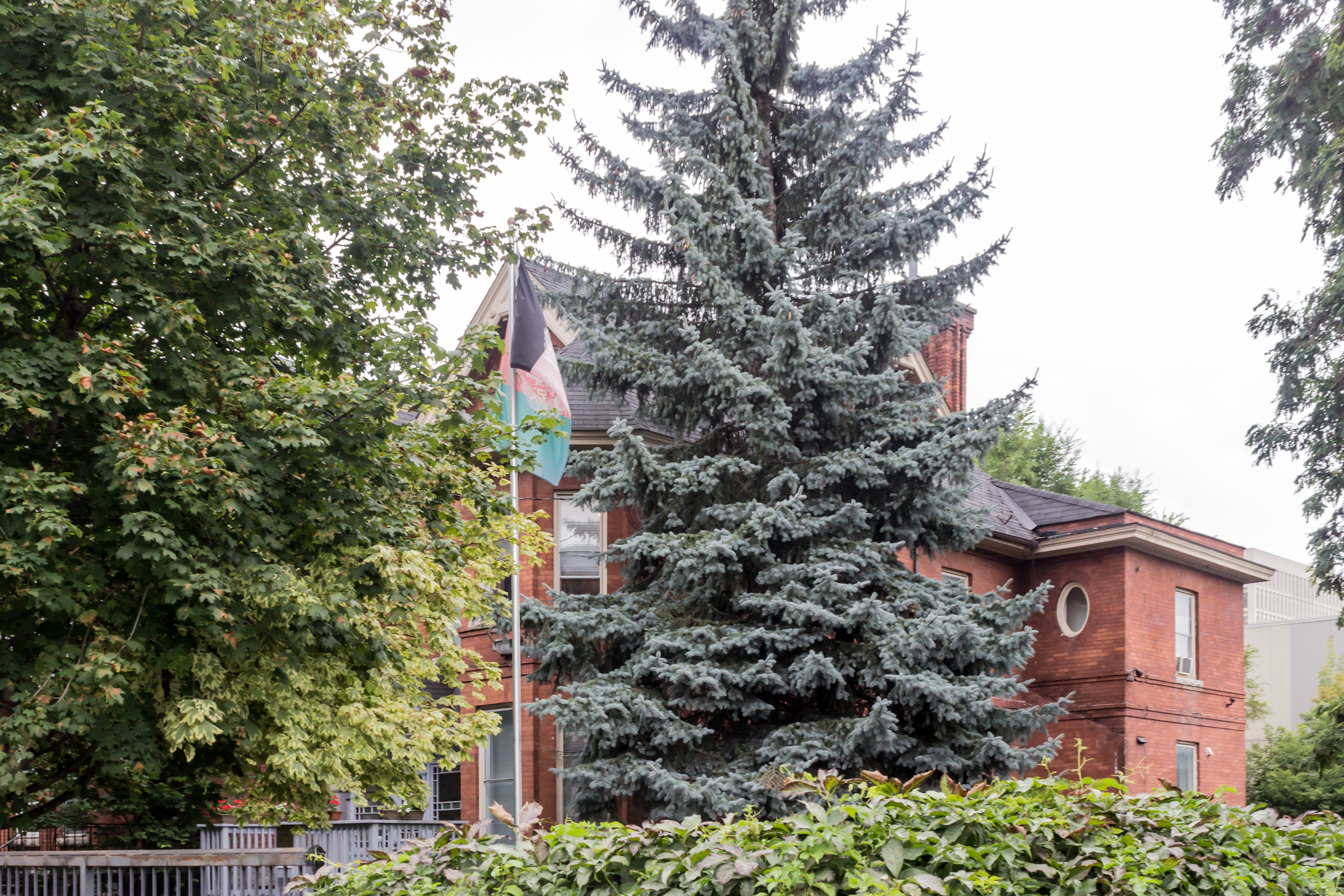
- Location: Ottawa
- Address: 240 Argyle Ave K2P 1B9
- Ambassador: Hassan Soroosh

The Embassy of Afghanistan is the Islamic Republic of Afghanistan's embassy in Ottawa. It is located at 240 Argyle Avenue in Ottawa, Ontario, Canada.

The embassy also provides consular services to those in the U.S. through an informal arrangement with the U.S. State Department since the U.S. closed the Embassy of Afghanistan, Washington, D.C. in 2022. Since the Taliban takeover, the Islamic Republic of Afghanistan's embassy in Ottawa is staffed by diplomats representing the former government, with Hassan Soroosh serving as ambassador. Since 2024, documents issued by the embassy are not recognized in Afghanistan. Those in Afghanistan already on a visa issued in Canada will be allowed to stay, however, will not be eligible for re-entry.

=== Embassy of Canada, Kabul ===
Embassy of Canada in Kabul
- Location: Kabul
- Address: House No. 256، Street No. 15, Kabul 1001
- Ambassador: David Sproule (Special Representative)

The Embassy of Canada is Canada's embassy in Kabul. It is located at House No. 256، Street No. 15, Kabul 1001 in Kabul, Afghanistan .

=== Afghan Ambassador to Canada ===
List of Afghan Representatives in Ottawa since 2002:

- M. Sharif Ghalib April 2002 – Minister Counsellor, Chargé d'Affaires
- Abdul Jalil Jamily October 2002 – November 2003
- M. Sharif Ghalib November 2003 – September 2004 – Minister Counsellor, Chargé d'Affaires
- Omar Samad September 2004 – June 2009
- Jawed Ludin June 2009 – February 2011
- Ershad Ahmadi February 2011 – March 2012 – Minister Counsellor, Chargé d'Affaires
- Barna Karimi March 2012 – 2013
- Shaam Lal Patija 2013–2014
- none appointed 2014–2016
- Shinkai Karokhel 2016–2018
- none appointed 2018–2023
- Hassan Soroosh – as of April 2023

=== Canadian Ambassador to Afghanistan ===
- Ron Hoffmann 2007–2010
- William Crosbie 2010–2012
- Glenn V. Davidson 2012–2013
- Deborah Lyons 2013–2016
- Kenneth Neufeld 2016–2017
- Francois Rivest 2017–2018
- David Metcalfe 2018–2020
- Reid Sirrs 2020
- embassy suspended operations 2020–2022
- David Sproule 2022–present – Special Representative of Canada
