= Jawed Ludin =

Afghan diplomat and minister

Jawed Ludin جاوید لودین

Deputy Minister from Ninistry of Foreign Affairs
- Incumbent
- Assumed office 2011
- President: Hamid Karzai
- Preceded by: Omar Samad

Personal details
- Born: March 16, 1973 Kabul, Afghanistan
- Education: Kabul University; University of London
- Occupation: Ambassador, politician

Jawed Ludin (Pashto: جاوید لودین) is a former Deputy Foreign Minister on Political Affairs of Afghanistan. He was appointed on 2011, by President Hamid Karzai. He was Ambassador of Afghanistan in Canada from 2009 to 2012, and had been spokesperson and later chief of staff to President Karzai.

== Early life and education ==
Jawed Ludin was born on March 16, 1973, in Kabul, Afghanistan. He completed his primary and secondary education in Kabul. In 1990, he was admitted to the Faculty of Medical Sciences of Kabul University where he studied general medicine until the summer of 1992 when the university was shut down due to the civil war. Jawed Ludin resumed his studies when he went to exile in London, United Kingdom, in 1998, studying politics and sociology. In 2002, he earned a Master of Science degree in Political Theory from the University of London. He is a candidate for an LLM degree in Public International Law from the University of Oslo.

== Work life ==
Since 1994 Ludin has been involved in humanitarian and development work, conflict resolution, management, media and public relations and politics.

Ludin has worked for a number of international NGOs based in Afghanistan, Pakistan and the United Kingdom. From 1994 to 1998, he worked with the Agency Co-ordinating Body for Afghan Relief (ACBAR). While he was in the UK, he worked with the British Agencies Afghanistan Group from 1999 until 2001 and British Overseas NGOs for Development from 2001 until 2003.

Ludin's political career started in November 2001 when he took part in organization of the United Nations-sponsored Bonn Conference that laid out the democratic framework for the post-Taliban Afghanistan. In early 2003, he gave up his doctorate studies at the University of London and returned to Afghanistan to take up his first political post as Presidential Spokesman and Director of Communications for President Hamid Karzai's government. He also was spokesperson of Karzai during the 2004 presidential election campaign On June 29, 2005, Ludin was appointed Chief of Staff of President Hamid Karzai, with responsibility for overall management of the President's Office and its various organs, and remained in that post until January 2007 when he was replaced by Omar Daudzai. The replacement came as Karzai was criticised for not taking strong action against corruption and drug trafficking. The resignation of Ludin was due to political infighting within Karzai's government said senior officials. Much of the blame for Karzai's poor performance has been blamed by Afghans on his staff and cabinet ministers and Ludin appears to have become a victim of the blame game. According to The Times Ludin was forced to resign after attempts to defend Britain led to accusations that he was a British spy. Some of Karzai's closest advisers had accused Britain of conspiring with Pakistan to hand over southern Afghanistan. Ludin submitted his resignation after Karzai had accused Ludin and Afghan Education Minister Hanif Atmar, who both had studied in Britain, of conspiring against him, although Karzai apologized later.

After his resignation, first there was speculation that Ludin would be appointed Ambassador to Egypt, but instead he was appointed as the Ambassador of Afghanistan to Norway, also accredited to Sweden, Denmark, Finland and Iceland. On June 3, 2009, Ludin replaced Omar Samad as the Ambassador of Afghanistan to Canada. It is reported that in December 2010 Ludin resigned as ambassador of Canada and went back to Afghanistan.

== Academic life ==
Ludin has written extensively on Afghanistan, the region as well as on conflict and development issues, including co-authoring a book on conflict management strategies (Zed Books UK, 2002) and articles and commentary in international publications, notably the Guardian in the UK.

Ludin is fluent in Pashto, Persian and English, and also speaks some French and Hindi.

== Personal life ==
Ludin has four daughters, Annahita, Arianne, Avesta and India. In an interview in 2003 he called his work for the Afghan government his "reason for existence," "Somehow I am being useful in my own little corner. I can have a meaningful life in London, but there is no way I can get rid of being an Afghan."

== Political views ==
=== Northern alliance ===
During the beginning of the War in Afghanistan in 2001, in a series of opinion articles in The Guardian Ludin was critical of the Northern Alliance, stating that it's hard to imagine that the Northern Alliance can be trusted to deliver the country to peace. He stressed the need for the UK and the US to focus on a political strategy, and not only a military strategy. At that time he called a leadership under the former king, Zahir Shah, promising option. A few years later, when he was President Karzai's chief of staff, Ludin defended the appointment of 13 warlords in high positions in the Afghan police: "This is not rearming militias. We would like to strengthen the police presence in districts in the south where there has been a rise in terrorism. Building institutions should not be seen as sidelining any sector of society, especially the mujahideen," he said.

=== Pakistan ===
As spokesperson of Karzai he urged Pakistan to do more about Taliban and terrorist in the Afghan Pakistan border region and criticised the Pakistani government of beïng soft on terrorism. In the months before the 2005 Parliamentary elections, he warned that the Taliban and Al Qaeda have chosen this time to set a plot in motion and he called for cooperation from Afghanistan's neighbors "Foreign enemies have been creating problems for Afghanistan over the past 30 years and terrorists come from across the border," said Ludin a week later.

On 23 June 2005, following the arrest of three Pakistani's suspected of planning to murder US ambassador Zalmay Khalilzad, Ludin attacked Pakistan for not helping enough with the fight against terrorism. He said the plot is just one example of recent violence by Pakistanis or Arab foreigners within Afghanistan. Militants involved in the current battle were trained at camps in Pakistan, Ludin claimed. He demanded immediate action from Islamabad against key leaders of the ousted Taliban regime sheltering in Pakistan and demanded that Pakistan close off its border to prevent the routed militants from fleeing back to a safe haven in Pakistan once again. A few hours later Pakistan President Pervez Musharraf telephoned his Karzai to defuse tensions.

In May 2006 Ludin repeated his allegations. He accused the Pakistani security forces of allowing militants to operate openly in cities such as Quetta, Karachi and Peshawar, as well as the tribal territories. "We have evidence that suicide bombings, roadside bombs and other terrorist actions taking place in Afghanistan emanate from Pakistan and that some Pakistani circles actually provide support for these activities," Ludin said. When the Indian engineer Suryanarayan was killed, Ludin said "There are common enemies who India and Afghanistan have who do not want India here. And when a Taliban commander claimed that the Pakistani secret service ISI had a hand in the killing of Suryanarayan, Ludin was quick to ask an explanation from Islamabad. In 2007 Ludin said again that Afghanistan had long maintained that the Islamic militants operated from within Pakistan.

While being Ambassador in the Nordic countries, Lundin wrote an opinion article in the Guardian in 2008 titled "Take this war into Pakistan." In this article Ludin states that the army of Pakistan has sought to undermine the international effort to stabilise Afghanistan and that it is in Pakistan that terrorism must be defeated. A supreme commander should be appointed to devise and implement an effective counter-terrorism strategy for operations on both sides of the Durand line that separates the two countries.

Towards Iran Ludin has been more kindly in his words. In an article about Iran seeking more influence in Afghanistan Ludin said: "History may prove that overly optimistic, but it is in our interests today to trust our Iranian neighbors and expect the same in return."

=== Taliban ===
According to Ludin the Karzai government was willing to let former Taliban members play a role in post-war Afghanistan, unless they have blood on their hands. In that case they will be captured as terrorists. But Ludin said that no more than 100 Taliban members worked as terrorist with Al Qaida, and that the Taliban no longer existed as a movement. "People associated with the former Communist regime are back. So are former mujahideen," said Ludin "Therefore, nothing should really stop the Taliban rank and file from taking part in the national life of the country." When Russia said the dividing into 'good' and 'bad' Taliban factions was unacceptable for them, Ludin responded moderate, saying he was hoping that Moscow would clarify its official position. Ludin stated in June 2005 that the terrorist threat in Afghanistan was fragile: "(The guerrillas) are very small compared with the increasing capability of our own forces, compared with the combined capability of the international community that's there to help us and compared to the will of the Afghan people."

In the end of 2009 Ludin stated as Ambassador to Canada that it is "very realistic" to expect a military victory over the Taliban by 2011 when the United States troops pull out of Afghanistan. But that will depend on how many resources to be put in training the Afghan national forces and preparing the Afghan institutions, he added.

=== Warlords ===
As spokesperson of President Karzai, Ludin repeatedly warned Afghan warlords that they will be facing sanctions they don't co-operate with the central government. In March 2004 Ludin announced the resignation of Afghan Planning Minister Mohammad Mohaqeq. He claimed that Mohaqeq expressed his desire to be out of the cabinet, but according to Mohaqeq he was illegally dismissed by president Karzai. In April 2004 Ludin said strong words to another important Afghan ethnic leader, Abdul Rashid Dostum. Ludin warned Dostum that, although Dostum was a Karzai adviser, if government investigation showed Dostum had anything to do with the uprising against Faryab Governor Anayatullah Anayat it would be deemed as an unlawful act. However, Ludin wasn't willing to speculate on any action against Dostum. Also other militia leaders who are not working with the Disarmament, Demobilisation and Reintegration programme will be brought to Justice, said Ludin.

In July 2004, when army commanders Ata Mohammad, Hazrat Ali and Khan Mohammed Khan were placed in civilian and police post it was, according to Ludin, to ensure that the upcoming presidential election was conducted freely and fairly, though the replacements were a result of careful negotiations. In August 2004 he spoke strong words when warlord Amanullah Khan (militia leader) fought his way to within sight of the outskirts of Herat, against troops of Herat Governor Ismail Khan: "whoever is responsible for this breakdown and breach of security will be brought to justice," Ludin said. When in December 2004 president Kaarzai appointed a new cabinet and ousted some high-profile warlords like Mohammed Fahim, Sayed Hussain Anwari and Gul Agha Sherzai, Ludin said this takes Afghanistan to a new era in which people come to the Cabinet because they are capable of serving the Afghan people and because they are educated. But when controversial Afghan warlord Abdul Rashid Dostum was given a post within the government as Chief of Staff of the High Command of the Armed Forces, Ludin called this "a good thing, a positive one." On allegations of war crimes of Dostum Ludin said: "Let's not talk about that because that's a completely different issue."

=== Corruption ===
Also on corruption, Ludin has taken a tough stand. When two deputy ministers were sent to prison because of corruption, Lundin said: "It is an important decision and warning to those who want to misuse and misappropriate their official position." Lundin has acknowledged that criminals in national police ranks get cover from senior government officials.

=== Hostages ===
While working as press secretary in Kabul, Lundin helped interim-president Karzai with his first elections. "God willing he will hold onto (the predicted lead)" said Ludin to reporters in October 2004. When two UN aid workers were taken hostage Ludin informed the press of negotiations, saying, two weeks before they were released, that "a lot of progress has been made" and that, although the captors demanded the release of 26 prisoners, the government was prepared to do anything to ensure the safety of the United Nations staff members, who had been working on the Afghan presidential election. When a few months later Timoor Shah claimed he killed another hostage, Clementina Cantoni, because the government didn't meet his demands, Ludin dismissed the claim saying: "He is lying. He makes such comments in order to put pressure on the government." Three weeks later it turned out Ludin was right, when Cantoni was released by the criminal gang who captured her.

=== Drugs ===
As spokesperson Ludin said that the drug war was a top priority for the government, "perhaps more important than terrorism," but that he opposed aerial spraying of poppy fields by troops of the international community. In May 2005 US Officials warned that the American financed poppy eradication program was ineffective, in part because Karzai was unwilling to assert strong leadership. Ludin responded that any progress in reducing poppy cultivation was a result of Karzais efforts and that foreign donors had failed to follow up on promises with helping Afghan farmers to find other sources of income. When Afghan Interior Minister Ali Ahmad Jalali resigned from his post, Ludin denied rumours that it was because he had disagreements with President Karzai about fighting narcotics.

=== United States ===
Ludin also expressed concern over the condition of Afghan prisoners in the prisons of the coalition forces. When in June 2005 17 Afghan civilians died in a U.S. airstrike, Ludin criticised US behaviour a rare rebuff: "There is no way the killing of civilians can be justified. It's the terrorists we are fighting. It's not our people who should suffer." When US Senator John McCain called for a permanent US base in Afghanistan, Ludin said that a long-term strategic partnership will be "for the benefit of Afghanistan," although the issue was sensitive in Afghanistan and the new parliament should decide on it After a Loya Jirga backing the plans, Ludin said: people of Afghanistan consider it necessary to have a long-term presence of foreign troops in the country until Afghan security forces are able to stand on their own feet. Opposition-leader Yunus Qanuni said that the information provided by Ludin was a distortion of the conclusions that Karzai drew at the end of the meeting.

When the US reached the 200 fatal casualties in 2005, Ludin said: "Two hundred lives is a big price to pay, but those lives have not been lost in fain.

In November 2006, right before the US midterm elections Ludin said he was not worried relations would change significantly after Democratic takeover of the House and Senate since Afghanistan has received bipartisan support from U.S. politicians. "I think the people of the United States have been with Afghanistan, and that's all that matters for our people," said Ludin. Ludin also expressed sadness about the abrupt departure of US Defense Secretary Donald Rumsfeld, saying that Afghanistan was "very pleased and very grateful" for his support.

=== Newsweek ===
When in May 2005 Newsweek made an erroneous report, saying interrogators desecrated the Koran at a U.S. military detention center for suspected terrorists, causing violent demonstrations in several Afghan Provinces killing 15 people, Lundin showed "in strongest terms his disapproval" that the low journalistic standard that this sensitive issue has been dealt with irresponsibly: "We are really angry that the principles of journalism have not been followed correctly," he said. Ludin also said that the government suspected elements from within and outside Afghanistan, hinting to Pakistan, had helped turn the peaceful protests violent, seeking to spread unrest while Mr Karzai was in Europe.

=== Accountability ===
In November 2005 President Karzai introduced Accountability Week. Each of the government's 34 ministers was given 20 minutes on national television to summarise successes and failures. "This is not just a ceremonial event or propaganda," promised Jawed Ludin, the presidential chief of staff. "This is a moment of truth, so that the government understands that it is serving the nation and must answer to the nation. The people must realise that they have the right to call the government to account." As showcase of the cabinet's competence, it failed, according to Economics professor Saifuddin Saihoo "The journalists knew more than some of the ministers."

=== Government ===
Ludin has acknowledged that not all the foreign aid money that came to Afghanistan after the fall of the Taliban has been spent wisely. "This golden period has also been this massive waste period," said Ludin,"The efficiency has to be increased." When in May 2006 during an anti-American protest some police officers had taken off their uniforms and joined the demonstrators and looters. "The reaction of our police was really shameful," Ludin responded to this, "What we learned from yesterday is that we have to strengthen our police." In September 2006 Ludin had to acknowledge another shortcoming of the government. "It's not that the Taliban were strong, it's that the government was weak. They have moved into a vacuum [in the south]" said Karzai after growing insecurity in Afghanistan.

=== Defending Karzai ===
As chief of staff he publicly had to defend his president in the summer of 2006: "People forget this is the president they are talking about. It's his responsibility to do his best for the people," Ludin said. "At the end of the day, he understands the politics of this country. I don't think anybody would argue about his sincerity." A few months later he said that people "still trust" Karzai and "still think he can lead them."

In 2009 Ludin stated that it is unfair to blame all of Afghanistan's troubles on a single individual [Karzai] who was denied the resources he needed from the start. "In the early days the international community did not have any coherent strategy and the question of governance was never raised," said Jawed Ludin. "In the beginning Donald Rumsfeld barged in with a purely military strategy. They did nothing to stop drug production and they hired militias who perpetuated a lot of atrocities."

In 2010 his support for Karzai became even less strong. In reactions to question if it was correct that Karzai had stated that if foreign pressure on him continues, Karzai could ally himself with the Taliban, Ludin dismissed this but added: "Even if he said something like that, it would be just a turn of phrase. And I know him; he has some turns of phrase"

In the end of 2010 leaked diplomatic cables revealed that William Crosbie, Canada's ambassador to Afghanistan, had strongly criticised Karzai in front of his US colleague. Ludin said this should not affect relations between the two countries: "Relations between Canada and Afghanistan go beyond people. Diplomats in Kabul quite often have fallen in traps of some common misperceptions" On Canadian television he added: "Canada has done so much for this country and that shouldn't be jeopardized by the reckless comments of an ambassador."

=== Cluster bombs ===
As ambassador to Norway Ludin helped persuade his government to change its stance and join nearly 100 nations in signing a treaty Wednesday banning the disputed weapons. Afghanistan was initially reluctant to join the pact but agreed to after lobbying by victims maimed by cluster munitions. After speaking with Soraj Ghulan Habib, a 17-year-old Afghan who was injured by a cluster bomb and rendered unable to walk, Ludin called Afghan President Hamid Karzai, who agreed to change his stance on the treaty. Ludin said his country's reversal was made possible by an article in the treaty that permits signatory nations to engage in military operations with nonsignatory nations like the United States.

=== Canadian effort in Afghanistan ===
In an interview with the Canwest News Service in 2009, Ludin said the international community should not be frustrated by the pace of progress in Afghanistan because his country has made significant gains in the eight years since the fall of its Taliban rulers despite the Western shortfalls in troops and meeting financial aid commitments. Ludin also expressed hope that Canada would still make a military contribution to his country after the 2011 deadline for withdrawal from Kandahar. Ludin said his country is deeply grateful for Canada's military sacrifice "really a heavy cost with lives."

After Liberal Leader Michael Ignatieff he suggested that Canadian aid money shouldn't be going to "crooks" or "warlords" running Afghanistan's government Ludin issued a statement rebuking Ignatieff for his "unjustified" characterization of the Afghan government as corrupt and illegitimate. Ludin said Ignatieff's blanket criticism is unfair to the "many selfless, dedicated Afghans in the government" and added that 80 per cent of all foreign aid in Afghanistan is spent directly by donor-nations, bypassing the Afghan government altogether.

In April 2010, Ludin said at an Afghan Canadian political panel: When things go rough, "the critical thing, the honourable thing, is to stay committed." Yes, he conceded, Canada has suffered, but you can't leave because things have got hard. "Canada has been a friend to Afghanistan in good times; we need Canada to be a friend in bad times.".

Around the same time, Ludin said that Canada's continued discussion of the treatment of Afghan detainees is a waste of time. Ludin said that security forces in his country has come a long way in recent years and that "the positive steps are being overshadowed by a debate that makes them look like a bunch of torturers," but that "if there weren't any problems in Afghanistan, if there wasn't human-rights violations, if our police and prisons were perfect, why did we need your help?". In the same interview Ludin said that Afghans would accept an end to Canada's combat mission but leaving entirely would baffle them. "We would like to believe that you are really serious about success in Afghanistan, that this wasn't just an exercise for your military to get some experience on the battlefield. We would like to believe you were actually there for us, which I believe is the case," he said. "It's a bit difficult to understand why some people now question whether you should be there. It's a bit of an insult, to be honest, to all the sacrifices that have been made."

In May 2010, Ludin warned that Afghanistan without western aid and military assistance could be more dangerous than just a failed state. "Not succeeding in Afghanistan is going to strengthen the forces opposing us in ways you cannot imagine. The war in Afghanistan is a war against a new enemy and if you don't fight it in Afghanistan you will fight it on your own doorstep." Therefore, Ludin asked Canada to stay active in Afghanistan to help build op the Afghan forces before the international troops leave in 2014. If you're asking whether today we would be able to take over responsibility for our own security, I would say no. But that's exactly why yesterday's decision was essentially a timeframe, 2014, and I'm confident it's a doable timeframe," Ludin told CTV's Canada AM. After the Canadian government said it was sending 1.000 Canadian troops into Afghanistan after their combat mission ends in 2011, Ludin said: "This is extremely welcome news for Afghanistan and very much in line with what my country needs at the present juncture."

=== Afghan presidential elections ===
Two weeks after the Afghan Presidential Election of August 2009, Ludin wrote an article in The Toronto Star In defence of the Afghan Elections. Ludin wrote "Like most Afghans, I did not expect a perfect election but I am very worried now about the growing negative, somewhat dismissive, tone of the post-election evaluations. The post-election negativity is casting a long shadow over a landmark day that otherwise would have counted as a major historical achievement for the country." Ludin wrote that the fact the election campaign was not primarily ethnic-based but also issue-based was a sign of the emergence of a modern political culture. The right response would be, according to Ludin, to maintain confidence in the integrity of the institutions in Afghanistan and support wholeheartedly whoever becomes the next president of Afghanistan. Later, Ludin claimed that the extent of fraud was exaggerated by the media and defended Karzai who was accused of stuffing ballots. Ludin said he personally witnessed stuffed ballot boxes during Afghanistan's parliamentary elections in 2005. "It was in our interest (then) to move on because the important thing was to maintain the integrity of the whole process and if there were problems, they were understandable. Now, for some reason, this time there was not much of an understanding for our problems,"

When two months it looked like there would be a run-off election, Ludin asked the international media to expect fraud again but nevertheless support the effort, saying the process may not be up to Western standards, but it is the best Afghanistan can do. He dismissed a third election-round or a coalition-government as illegal. Ludin suggested that if one candidate stepped down, he could find himself with a job in a future government. But he stressed that didn't mean a coalition government had been formed. The editorial of the Toronto Sun attacked Ludin for his statements that it was naïve to expect fair elections in Afghanistan.

Eventually the situation ended with one of the candidates, Abdullah Abdullah stepping down, resulting in a second term for incumbent president Hamid Karzai. Ludin denied that as a result of this the legitimacy of Karzai will be in question.

Diplomatic posts
Preceded by Omar Samad	Ambassador of Afghanistan to Canada; 2009-2011	Succeeded by Ershad Ahmadi as Minister Counsellor, Chargé d'Affaires; Barna Karimi
