= Robert David Jackson =

Canadian diplomat (1934–2021)

David Jackson

Canadian Ambassador Extraordinary and Plenipotentiary to Lebanon
- In office 22 September 1982 – 1984
- Monarch: Elizabeth II
- Prime Minister: Pierre Trudeau
- Preceded by: Théodore Jean Arcand
- Succeeded by: Jacques Noiseux

7th Canadian Ambassador Extraordinary and Plenipotentiary to Syria
- In office 22 September 1982 – 1984
- Monarch: Elizabeth II
- Prime Minister: Pierre Trudeau
- Preceded by: Théodore Jean Arcand
- Succeeded by: Keith William MacLellan

10th Canadian Commissioner in ICSC for Laos
- In office 1 September 1972 – 22 May 1973
- Monarch: Elizabeth II
- Prime Minister: Pierre Trudeau
- Preceded by: Albert Frederick Hart
- Succeeded by: André S. Simard

14th Canadian Commissioner in ICSC for Vietnam
- In office 28 June 1971 – 22 May 1973
- Monarch: Elizabeth II
- Prime Minister: Pierre Trudeau
- Preceded by: Albert Frederick Hart
- Succeeded by: Office abolished

Personal details
- Born: Robert David Jackson; 26 December 1934 London, United Kingdom
- Died: 9 May 2021 (aged 86) Blacks Harbour, New Brunswick, Canada
- Education: University of British Columbia, London School of Economics
- Occupation: Diplomat

Robert David Jackson (26 December 1934 – 9 May 2021) was a Canadian diplomat who served in various international roles, including as Canadian Ambassador to Syria and Lebanon from 1982 to 1984.

== Early life and education ==
Jackson was born in London, United Kingdom, on 26 December 1934. As a child, he survived the London Blitz during World War II. After the war, he emigrated to Canada with his mother and sister, settling in Vancouver, British Columbia. Jackson attended Lord Byng Secondary School, graduating as valedictorian in 1952. He pursued studies in international and political science at the University of British Columbia from 1952 to 1956 and later attended Hamburg University in 1955 and the London School of Economics from 1956 to 1960.

Jackson was a recipient of the IODE War Memorial Scholarship in 1958, an award granted for academic excellence in his field.

== Diplomatic career ==
Jackson joined the Canadian Department of External Affairs in 1960 and began a diplomatic career representing Canada abroad. His early assignments included postings in Germany, Hong Kong, Vietnam, and Laos. In 1982, he was appointed the Canadian Ambassador to Lebanon and Syria. Jackson was one of the last embassy members to remain in Beirut during the 1984 international evacuation.

== Later life and legacy ==
Following his retirement in 1997, Jackson returned to Canada, settling in Seeley Cove, New Brunswick. He spent his final years at the Fundy Nursing Home in Blacks Harbour, New Brunswick, where he died peacefully on 9 May 2021 at the age of 86.

== Personal life ==
Jackson was predeceased by his parents, Mary Louise Jackson and Geoffrey Cecil Roberts Jackson, as well as his sister, Valerie Rosemary Walker.

== See also ==
- List of Canadian diplomats
- Canada–Lebanon relations
- Canada–Syria relations
