= List of ambassadors of Canada to Afghanistan =

Ambassador of Canada to Afghanistan
- Incumbent; David Sproule (special representative) since October 7, 2022
- Seat: Doha, Qatar
- Nominator: Prime Minister of Canada
- Appointer: Governor General of Canada
- Term length: At His Majesty's pleasure
- Inaugural holder: Charles Eustace McGaughey
- Formation: March 21, 1968; 58 years ago

The ambassador of Canada to Afghanistan is the official representative of the Canadian government to the government of Afghanistan. The official title for the ambassador is Ambassador Extraordinary and Plenipotentiary of Canada to the Islamic Republic of Afghanistan. The current senior Canadian diplomat titled as the Special Representative of Canada to the Islamic Republic of Afghanistan is David Sproule who was appointed on the advice of Prime Minister Justin Trudeau on October 7, 2022.

The Embassy of Canada is located at Street No. 15, House No. 256, Wazir Akbar Khan in Kabul, Afghanistan.

== History of diplomatic relations ==
Diplomatic relations between Canada and Afghanistan were established in 1968, with the first ambassador, Charles Eustace McGaughey, appointed on the advice of Prime Minister Lester B. Pearson on March 21, 1968. Diplomatic relations were severed in December 1979 the change in government resulting from the Soviet–Afghan War. Diplomatic relations were restored between Canada and Afghanistan on January 22, 2002, following the 2001 Bonn Conference and the appointment of Hamid Karzai as Chairman of the Afghan Interim Administration. Relations between Canada and Afghanistan were suspended on following the fall of Kabul, and the taliban take over. The most recent Ambassador was Reid Sirrs.

== List of Canadian ambassadors to Afghanistan ==
No.	Name	Term of office			Career	Prime Minister nominated by	Ref.
No.	Name	Start Date	PoC.	End Date	Career	Prime Minister nominated by	Ref.
1	Charles Eustace McGaughey	March 21, 1968	September 17, 1968	July 10, 1969	Career	Lester B. Pearson (1963-1968)	
2	Charles John Small	July 15, 1969	October 12, 1969	August 19, 1972	Career	Pierre Elliott Trudeau (1968-1979)	
3	John Gaylard Hadwen	May 23, 1972	July 20, 1974	1974	Career	Pierre Elliott Trudeau (1968-1979)	
4	Keith William MacLellan	June 10, 1974	October 14, 1974	July 12, 1977	Career	Pierre Elliott Trudeau (1968-1979)	
5	William Frank Stone	June 30, 1977	September 25, 1977	August 25, 1978	Career	Pierre Elliott Trudeau (1968-1979)	
6	Albert Douglas Small	November 23, 1978	November 8, 1979	1979	Career	Pierre Elliott Trudeau (1968-1979)	
—	1979 – January 22, 2002, Diplomatic relations severed as the Canadian government refused to recognize the Afghanistan government						
7	Konrad Sigurdson	January 24, 2002		2003	Career	Jean Chrétien (1993-2003)	
8	Christopher Alexander	July 31, 2003	September 3, 2003	2005	Career	Jean Chrétien (1993-2003)	
9	David Sproule	October 5, 2005	December 2005	April 2007	Career	Paul Martin (2003-2006)	
10	Arif Lalani	April 24, 2007		August 2008	Career	Stephen Harper (2006-2015)	
11	Ron Hoffmann	September 2, 2008		July 2009	Career	Stephen Harper (2006-2015)	
12	William Crosbie	June 9, 2009		September 2011	Career	Stephen Harper (2006-2015)	
—	Shelley Whiting (Chargé d'affaires)	November 21, 2011		May 20, 2012	Career	Stephen Harper (2006-2015)	
13	Glenn V. Davidson	August 8, 2011	June 2, 2012	July 2013	Non-Career	Stephen Harper (2006-2015)	
—	James Hill (Chargé d'affaires)	July 24, 2013		September 28, 2013	Career	Stephen Harper (2006-2015)	
—	David Collins (Chargé d'affaires)	August 20, 2013		September 15, 2013	Career	Stephen Harper (2006-2015)	
14	Deborah Lyons	July 10, 2013	October 16, 2013	August 2016	Career	Stephen Harper (2006-2015)	
15	Kenneth Neufeld	June 1, 2016	September 4, 2016	August 2017	Career	Justin Trudeau (2015–Present)	
16	François Rivest	August 17, 2017	August 28, 2017	August 2018	Career	Justin Trudeau (2015–Present)	
17	David Metcalfe	September 4, 2018	October 8, 2018	October 2020	Career	Justin Trudeau (2015–Present)	
18	Reid Sirrs	October 14, 2020	December 29, 2020		Career	Justin Trudeau (2015–Present)	
—	David Sproule; Special Representative of Canada	October 7, 2022		Present	Career	Justin Trudeau (2015–Present)	

== See also ==
- Afghanistan–Canada relations
- List of ambassadors of Afghanistan to Canada
