= Mark Bailey (diplomat) =

Canadian diplomat (1951–2021)

Mark Edward Rachid Bailey
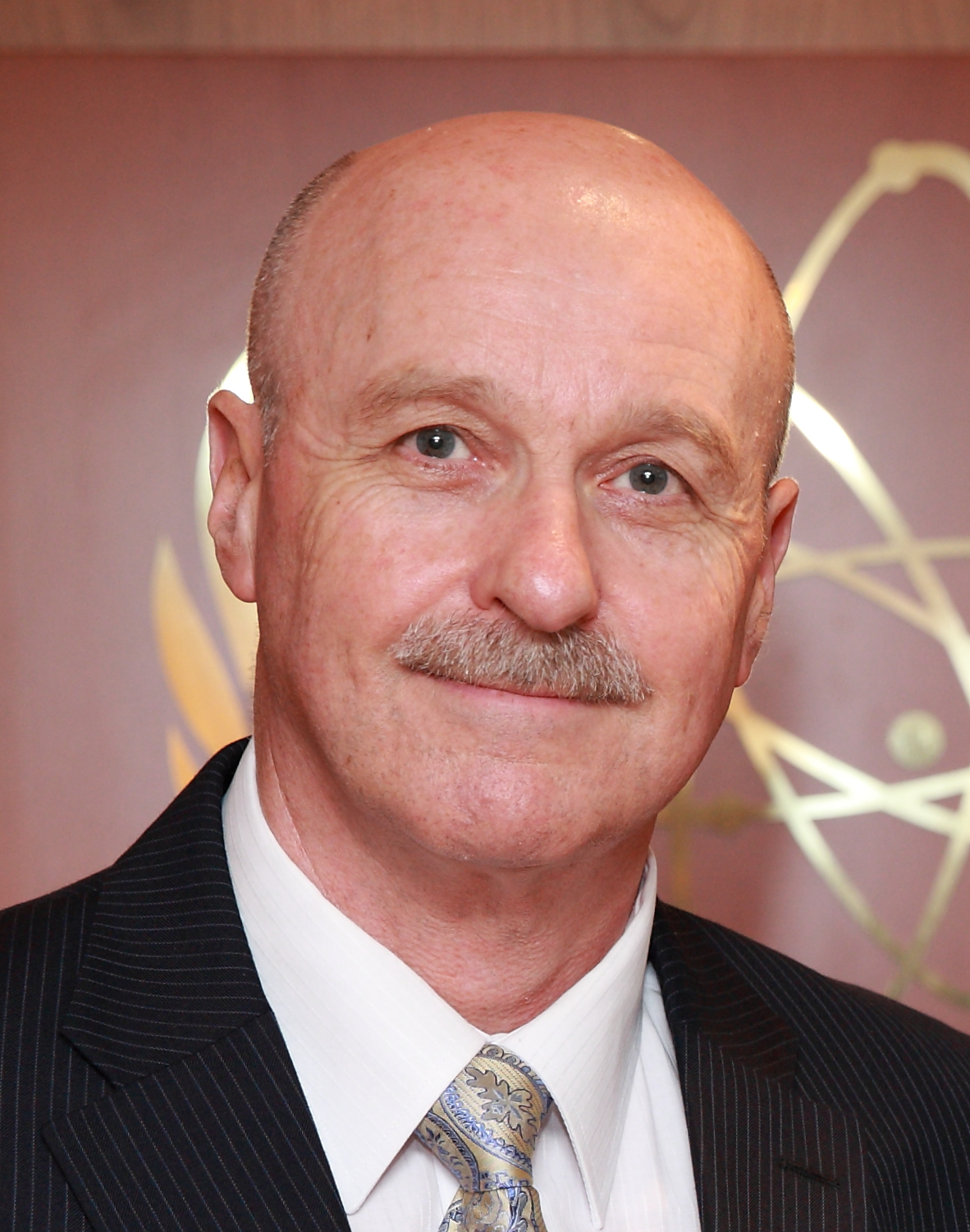

9th Canadian Ambassador Extraordinary and Plenipotentiary to Slovakia
- In office 17 January 2014 – July 2017
- Monarch: Elizabeth II
- Prime Minister: Stephen Harper; Justin Trudeau
- Preceded by: John Barrett
- Succeeded by: Heidi Hulan

Canadian Ambassador Extraordinary and Plenipotentiary to Austria
- In office 17 September 2013 – July 2017
- Monarch: Elizabeth II
- Prime Minister: Stephen Harper; Justin Trudeau
- Preceded by: John Barrett
- Succeeded by: Heidi Hulan

5th Canadian Ambassador and Permanent Representative to the International Organizations in Vienna, Austria
- In office 17 September 2013 – July 2017
- Monarch: Elizabeth II
- Prime Minister: Stephen Harper; Justin Trudeau
- Preceded by: John Barrett
- Succeeded by: Heidi Hulan

Canadian Ambassador Extraordinary and Plenipotentiary to Turkmenistan
- In office 22 July 2008 – 2011
- Monarch: Elizabeth II
- Prime Minister: Stephen Harper
- Preceded by: Yves Brodeur
- Succeeded by: John T. Holmes

Canadian Ambassador Extraordinary and Plenipotentiary to Turkey
- In office 22 July 2008 – 2011
- Monarch: Elizabeth II
- Prime Minister: Stephen Harper
- Preceded by: Yves Brodeur
- Succeeded by: John T. Holmes

8th Canadian Ambassador Extraordinary and Plenipotentiary to Azerbaijan
- In office 22 July 2008 – 2011
- Monarch: Elizabeth II
- Prime Minister: Stephen Harper
- Preceded by: Yves Brodeur
- Succeeded by: John T. Holmes

16th Canadian Ambassador Extraordinary and Plenipotentiary to Syria
- In office 14 June 2006 – 2008
- Monarch: Elizabeth II
- Prime Minister: Stephen Harper
- Preceded by: Brian Davis
- Succeeded by: Glenn Davidson

13th Canadian Ambassador Extraordinary and Plenipotentiary to Morocco
- In office 15 July 1998 – August 2001
- Monarch: Elizabeth II
- Prime Minister: Jean Chrétien
- Preceded by: Jean-Guy Joseph Bernard Saint-Martin
- Succeeded by: Yves Gagnon

Personal details
- Born: August 20, 1951 Victoria, British Columbia, Canada
- Died: August 22, 2021 (aged 70)
- Children: 3
- Occupation: Diplomat

Mark Edward Bailey (20 August 1951 – 22 August 2021) was a Canadian diplomat who held office as Canadian ambassador to many countries during his years of service.

== Education and early career ==
Bailey graduated with a Bachelor of Arts Honours in Political Science from the University of Victoria in 1973. That same year, he joined the Canadian Department of External Affairs.

== Diplomatic career ==
Throughout his career, Bailey held several notable positions both in Canada and abroad. His assignments included:

- Serving in the Personnel Operations Division in Ottawa
- Desk officer for the Organisation for Economic Co-operation and Development
- Deputy director of investment policy and financial affairs
- Director of the International Financial and Investment Affairs Division
- Director of the Maghreb and Arabian Peninsula Division
- Director of the Assignments Division
- Director general of the Middle East and North Africa Bureau

Bailey also held several postings abroad:

- New York City, United States
- Abidjan, Côte d'Ivoire
- Jeddah, Saudi Arabia
- Geneva, Switzerland
- Washington, D.C., United States

He served as ambassador to various countries:

- Ambassador to Morocco
- Ambassador to Syria
- Ambassador to Turkey, with non-resident accreditation to Azerbaijan, Georgia, and Turkmenistan

In January 2012, Bailey was named Special Adviser on Iran and Syria. He later served as Director General of the Middle East Bureau.

== Death ==
Bailey died on 22 August 2021.

== See also ==
- List of ambassadors and high commissioners of Canada
  - List of ambassadors of Canada to Austria
  - List of ambassadors of Canada to Syria
