= Joseph Gilles André Couvrette =

Canadian diplomat (1934–2020)

Canadian Ambassador Extraordinary and Plenipotentiary to Greece
- In office 29 March 1985 – 16 August 1989
- Monarch: Elizabeth II
- Prime Minister: Brian Mulroney
- Preceded by: Edward Henry Woodford (As Chargé d'Affaires)
- Succeeded by: Ernest Hébert

Canadian Ambassador Extraordinary and Plenipotentiary to Sweden
- In office 5 February 1981 – 9 December 1983
- Monarch: Elizabeth II
- Prime Minister: Pierre Trudeau
- Preceded by: Kenneth Charles Brown
- Succeeded by: William Thomas Delworth

5th Canadian Ambassador Extraordinary and Plenipotentiary to Jordan
- In office 31 August 1977 – 1 December 1978
- Monarch: Elizabeth II
- Prime Minister: Pierre Trudeau
- Preceded by: Howard Barham Singleton (As Chargé d'Affaires)
- Succeeded by: Théodore Jean Arcand

Canadian Ambassador Extraordinary and Plenipotentiary to Lebanon
- In office 31 August 1977 – 27 September 1978
- Monarch: Elizabeth II
- Prime Minister: Pierre Trudeau
- Preceded by: Howard Barham Singleton (As Chargé d'Affaires)
- Succeeded by: Théodore Jean Arcand

5th Canadian Ambassador Extraordinary and Plenipotentiary to Syria
- In office 31 August 1977 – 27 September 1978
- Monarch: Elizabeth II
- Prime Minister: Pierre Trudeau
- Preceded by: Howard Barham Singleton (As Chargé d'Affaires)
- Succeeded by: Théodore Jean Arcand

1st Canadian Ambassador Extraordinary and Plenipotentiary to Cabo Verde
- In office 20 July 1976 – 23 July 1977
- Monarch: Elizabeth II
- Prime Minister: Pierre Trudeau
- Preceded by: Office established
- Succeeded by: Jacques J.A. Asselin

1st Canadian Ambassador Extraordinary and Plenipotentiary to Guinea-Bissau
- In office 24 April 1975 – 23 July 1977
- Monarch: Elizabeth II
- Prime Minister: Pierre Trudeau
- Preceded by: Office established
- Succeeded by: Jacques J.A. Asselin

5th Canadian High Commissioner to The Gambia
- In office 10 June 1974 – 1977
- Monarch: Elizabeth II
- Prime Minister: Pierre Trudeau
- Preceded by: Raoul Jean Grenier
- Succeeded by: Jacques J.A. Asselin

8th Canadian Ambassador Extraordinary and Plenipotentiary to Guinea
- In office 10 June 1974 – 1977
- Monarch: Elizabeth II
- Prime Minister: Pierre Trudeau
- Preceded by: Raoul Jean Grenier
- Succeeded by: Jacques J.A. Asselin

4th Canadian Ambassador Extraordinary and Plenipotentiary to Mali
- In office 10 June 1974 – 16 June 1976
- Monarch: Elizabeth II
- Prime Minister: Pierre Trudeau
- Preceded by: Raoul Jean Grenier
- Succeeded by: Michel de Goumois

4th Canadian Ambassador Extraordinary and Plenipotentiary to Mauritania
- In office 10 June 1974 – 23 July 1977
- Monarch: Elizabeth II
- Prime Minister: Pierre Trudeau
- Preceded by: Raoul Jean Grenier
- Succeeded by: Jacques J.A. Asselin

6th Canadian Ambassador Extraordinary and Plenipotentiary to Senegal
- In office 10 June 1974 – 23 July 1977
- Monarch: Elizabeth II
- Prime Minister: Pierre Trudeau
- Preceded by: Raoul Jean Grenier
- Succeeded by: Gabriel-Marie Frédéric Lessard (As Chargé d'Affaires)

Personal details
- Born: 15 January 1934 Outremont, Quebec, Canada
- Died: 31 December 2020 (aged 86) Ottawa, Ontario, Canada
- Spouse: Micheline Couvrette
- Children: 4
- Occupation: Diplomat

Joseph Gilles André Couvrette (15 January 1934 – 31 December 2020) was a Canadian diplomat who held several international postings.

He served as Canada’s Ambassador Extraordinary and Plenipotentiary to various countries, as well as High Commissioner to The Gambia.

== Early life and family ==
Couvrette was born on 15 January 1934 in Outremont, Quebec, Canada, to businessman and former mayor of Outremont, Bernard Couvrette, and Myrielle Chartrand. He later married Micheline Couvrette, with whom he had four children: Louis, Michel, Anne-Marie, and Philippe.

== Career ==
Couvrette’s diplomatic career began in 1959 with his first posting to Rome, Italy, where he served until 1962. He subsequently held assignments in Lagos, Nigeria (1965–1967), and Paris, France (1967–1968). His first ambassadorship was in Dakar, Senegal, where he was accredited to multiple countries, including Guinea, Mali, Mauritania, Cape Verde, and Guinea-Bissau. He was then appointed Ambassador to Beirut, Lebanon, concurrently serving as ambassador to Jordan and Syria. Later assignments included ambassadorial roles in Stockholm, Sweden, and Athens, Greece, marking the end of his international career.

In Canada, Couvrette held prominent roles, including Chief of Protocol and Assistant Under Secretary of State for External Affairs, where he oversaw diplomatic protocols and international relations.

== Death ==
Couvrette died on 31 December 2020, at the age of 86, at the Hôpital Élizabeth-Bruyère in Ottawa. His family held a visitation at the Complexe Alfred Dallaire Memoria on 8 January 2021, with a funeral at St-Viateur d'Outremont Church on a later date.

== See also ==
- List of ambassadors and high commissioners of Canada
