= Jacques Noiseux =

Canadian diplomat (1936–2016)

14th Canadian Ambassador Extraordinary and Plenipotentiary to Algeria
- In office 3 May 1995 – 25 August 1997
- Monarch: Elizabeth II
- Prime Minister: Jean Chrétien
- Preceded by: Michel Perrault
- Succeeded by: Franco D. Pillarella

9th Canadian Ambassador Extraordinary and Plenipotentiary to Syria
- In office 28 August 1985 – 7 July 1987
- Monarch: Elizabeth II
- Prime Minister: Brian Mulroney
- Preceded by: Keith William MacLellan
- Succeeded by: Gary Richard Harman

Canadian Ambassador Extraordinary and Plenipotentiary to Lebanon
- In office 31 August 1984 – 7 July 1987
- Monarch: Elizabeth II
- Prime Minister: Brian Mulroney
- Preceded by: Robert David Jackson
- Succeeded by: Ian Ferguson (As Chargé d'Affaires)

Personal details
- Born: 8 December 1936
- Died: 24 February 2016 (aged 79) Montreal, Quebec, Canada
- Occupation: Diplomat

Jacques Noiseux (8 December 1936 – 24 February 2016) was a Canadian diplomat who served in several prominent foreign service positions from 1965 to 1998.

He represented Canada as Ambassador to Lebanon, Syria, and Algeria and held numerous diplomatic posts around the world.

== Life ==
Noiseux was born on 8 December 1936, the son of Fortunat Noiseux and Marguerite Hébert. He was predeceased by his sister Louise and brother Jean.

== Diplomatic career ==
Noiseux's career in the Canadian Foreign Service began in 1965 and spanned over three decades. He held various significant diplomatic postings, including Ambassador to Lebanon, Syria, and Algeria. He was also appointed to key roles in the British Commonwealth, including as Assistant to the Queen's Equerry at Buckingham Palace and as Assistant to the Secretary to the Governor General of Canada.

Throughout his career, Noiseux served in several diplomatic missions, including at Canada's embassies in Kinshasa, Dakar, Paris, Nairobi, and New York, where he worked at the Consulate-General.

=== Withdrawal from Syria and Lebanon ===
In 1985, amidst the volatile situation in Lebanon, Noiseux was involved in Canada's diplomatic efforts during the Lebanese Civil War. On 15 June 1985, following increasing risks to the safety of Canadian diplomats, the Canadian government ordered the closure of its embassy in Beirut. Noiseux, along with embassy staff and their families, was evacuated to Amman, Jordan.

Canada's withdrawal of its ambassador to Syria was in support of Britain’s decision to sever diplomatic ties with Damascus following a bomb plot linked to the Syrian government. The Canadian government supported the action taken by Britain in light of the events surrounding the bombing attempt on an El Al passenger jet in April 1986.

== Death ==
Noiseux died on 24 February 2016 at the age of 79 at St. Mary’s Hospital in Montreal after a short illness. His funeral was held at the Chapelle de la Résurrection in Montreal on 3 March 2016. In lieu of flowers, donations in his memory were requested for St. Mary’s Hospital Foundation and the Montreal Neurological Institute.

== See also ==
- List of Canadian diplomats
- List of Canadian ambassadors to Syria
- List of Canadian ambassadors to Algeria
