= Howard Barham Singleton =

Canadian diplomat (1927–2020)

Canadian Ambassador Extraordinary and Plenipotentiary to Haiti
- In office 10 July 1980 – 1983
- Monarch: Elizabeth II
- Prime Minister: Pierre Trudeau
- Preceded by: Pierre Robert Garceau
- Succeeded by: Joseph Anthony Malone

Chargé d'Affaires at the Canadian Embassy in Lebanon
- In office 4 September 1976 – 1 October 1977
- Monarch: Elizabeth II
- Prime Minister: Pierre Trudeau
- Preceded by: Alan William Sullivan
- Succeeded by: Joseph Gilles André Couvrette (As Ambassador Extraordinary and Plenipotentiary)

Chargé d'Affaires at the Canadian Embassy in Syria
- In office September 1976 – 1 October 1977
- Monarch: Elizabeth II
- Prime Minister: Pierre Trudeau
- Preceded by: Alan William Sullivan
- Succeeded by: Joseph Gilles André Couvrette (As Ambassador Extraordinary and Plenipotentiary)

Chargé d'Affaires at the Canadian Embassy in Jordan
- In office September 1976 – 10 October 1977
- Monarch: Elizabeth II
- Prime Minister: Pierre Trudeau
- Preceded by: Alan William Sullivan
- Succeeded by: Joseph Gilles André Couvrette (As Ambassador Extraordinary and Plenipotentiary)

Personal details
- Born: 7 September 1927 Edmonton, Alberta, Canada
- Died: 14 March 2020 (aged 92) London, United Kingdom
- Education: University of Alberta, Christ Church, Oxford
- Occupation: Diplomat

Howard Barham Singleton (7 September 1927 – 14 March 2020) was a Canadian diplomat who served in numerous capacities, including as Canadian Ambassador to Haiti.

== Early life and education ==
Singleton was born on 7 September 1927 in Edmonton, Alberta, Canada. He studied at the University of Alberta before receiving an Imperial Order Daughters of the Empire scholarship, which enabled him to attend Christ Church, Oxford.

== Diplomatic career ==
Singleton pursued a long career as a Canadian diplomat. His service included postings in Finland, the United States, Vietnam, Lebanon, and various other countries. Notably, he served as the Canadian Ambassador to Haiti from 1980 to 1983.

== Later life and death ==
After retiring from his diplomatic career, Singleton moved to London, United Kingdom, at the age of 70.

Singleton died on 14 March 2020 in London at the age of 91. He was survived by his adoptive sons Sean and Colin McAdam and their children. A memorial service was held in Ottawa, with his ashes being laid to rest alongside his parents in Edmonton.

== See also ==
- List of ambassadors and high commissioners of Canada
- Canada–Haiti relations
