= Brian Davis (diplomat) =

Canadian diplomat (died 2017)

Brian John Davis

15th Canadian Ambassador Extraordinary and Plenipotentiary to Syria
- In office 31 July 2003 – 2006
- Monarch: Elizabeth II
- Prime Minister: Paul Martin
- Preceded by: Franco D. Pillarella
- Succeeded by: Mark Bailey

Personal details
- Died: 20 February 2017 Ottawa, Ontario, Canada
- Spouse: Beverley Davis (née Roche)
- Children: 2

Brian John Davis (died 20 February 2017) was a Canadian diplomat who served as the Ambassador to Syria from 2003 to 2006.

He was a senior officer with Canada's Department of Employment and Immigration, where he held various roles before his ambassadorial appointment.

== Early life ==
Brian Davis was the son of Brian E. Davis of Quebec City and Drusilla Davis (née Hewitt). He grew up in a large family, with six siblings.

== Career ==
Davis spent much of his career in Canada's Department of Employment and Immigration. His tenure culminated in his appointment as the Canadian Ambassador to Syria, a position he held from 2003 to 2006.

== Personal life ==
Brian Davis was married to Beverley Davis (née Roche) for 45 years. The couple had two daughters, Kelly and Jennifer.

He was predeceased by his father and survived by his mother and his siblings.

== Death and legacy ==
Brian Davis died peacefully at home on 20 February 2017. A memorial service was held at the Kelly Funeral Home and Chapel in Ottawa on 4 March 2017.

In his memory, his family established the Brian Davis Memorial Fund to support the Ottawa Regional Cancer Foundation.

== See also ==
- List of ambassadors and high commissioners of Canada
  - List of ambassadors of Canada to Syria
