= Embassy of Canada, Kabul =

Diplomatic mission of Canada in Afghanistan 2003–21

Embassy of Canada in Afghanistan
- Location: Wazir Akbar Khan, Kabul
- Address: Street No. 15, House No. 256
- Coordinates: 34.533136°N 69.183751°E
- Ambassador: Reid Sirrs

The Embassy of Canada in Afghanistan (Persian: سفارت کانادا در کابل) was the diplomatic mission of the Canadian government located in the Afghan capital city of Kabul. It was responsible for bilateral relations between Canada and Afghanistan. Diplomatic relations between the two countries were re-established on September 5, 2003. The relations were suspended in light of the fall of Kabul, and the Taliban takeover. The most recent Ambassador was Reid Sirrs.

== History ==
On 20 June 2016, guards at the embassy were attacked by a suicide bomber belonging to either the Taliban or the Islamic State of Iraq and the Levant. At least 14 to 16 people were killed, not including the suicide bomber. Nine people were injured.

=== Closure ===
As the 2021 withdrawal of American forces from Afghanistan led to a powerful Taliban offensive, Canada deployed special forces to evacuate the staff inside, and closed the embassy later in August 2021. Operations were relocated to the Canadian Embassy in Doha, Qatar.

== See also ==
- Afghanistan–Canada relations
- Canada in the War in Afghanistan
