= Davidson Black =

Canadian anthropologist

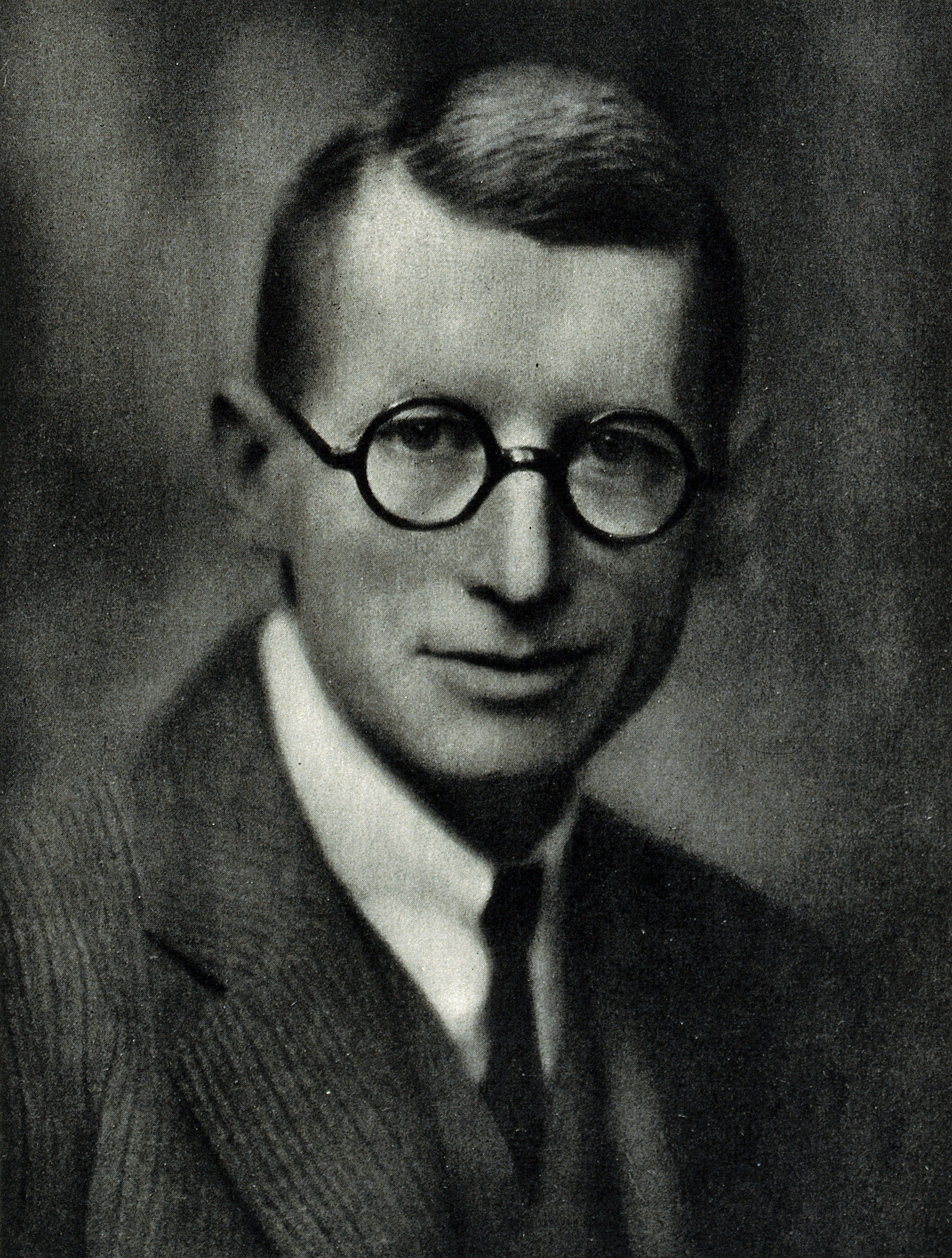
- Davidson Black
- Born: July 25, 1884; Toronto, Ontario, Canada
- Died: March 15, 1934 (aged 49); Beijing, China
- Known for: Homo erectus pekinensis
- Awards: Daniel Giraud Elliot Medal (1931); Fellow of the Royal Society
- Scientific career
- Fields: paleoanthropology

Davidson Black (July 25, 1884 – March 15, 1934) was a Canadian paleoanthropologist, best known for his naming of Sinanthropus pekinensis (now Homo erectus pekinensis). He was Chairman of the Geological Survey of China and a Fellow of the Royal Society. He was known as 步達生 (pinyin: Bù Dáshēng) in China.

== Early years, family and education ==
Black was born in 1884, in Toronto, Ontario, Canada. When he was a child, he would spend many summers near or on the Kawartha lakes. As a teenager, he would carry heavy loads of supplies for the Hudson's Bay Company. He also enjoyed collecting fossils along the banks of the Don River. He also became friends with First Nations people, and learned one First Nations language. Black also searched unsuccessfully for gold along the Kawartha lakes.

Black showed an interest in biology at an early age, despite being born to a family associated with the legal profession.

In 1906, Black earned a degree in medical science at the University of Toronto. He continued in school, studying comparative anatomy.

== Career ==
In 1909, Black became an anatomy instructor. He spent half a year in 1914 working under a neuroanatomist Grafton Elliot Smith, in Manchester, England. Smith was studying Piltdown Man during this time. This began an interest for Black in human evolution.

In 1917 he joined the Royal Canadian Army Medical Corps, where he treated injured returning Canadian soldiers.

In 1919, after his discharge from the Canadian Army Medical Corps, he went to China to work at Peking Union Medical College. Starting as Professor of Neurology and Embryology, he would be promoted to head of the anatomy department in 1924. He planned to search for human fossils in 1926, though the College encouraged him to concentrate on teaching. During this period Johan Gunnar Andersson, who had done excavations near Dragon Bone Hill (Zhoukoudian) in 1921, learned in Sweden of Black's fossils examination. He gave Black two human-similar molars to examine. The following year, with a grant from the Rockefeller Foundation, Black began his search around Zhoukoudian. During this time, though military unrest involving the National Revolutionary Army caused many western Scientists to leave China, Davidson Black and his family stayed.

Black then launched a large scale investigation at the site. He was appointed primary coordinator. As such, he appointed both Western and Chinese scientists. In summer 1926, two molars were discovered by Otto Zdansky, who headed the excavations and who described them in 1927 (Bulletin of the Geolocical Survey, China) as fossils of genus Homo. Black thought they belonged to a new human species and named them Sinanthropus pekinensis. He carried this tooth in a small copper case lined with velvet attached to his belt.

Later, he presented the tooth to the Rockefeller Foundation, which wanted more specimens before further grants would be given.

During November 1928, a lower jaw and several teeth and skull fragments were discovered. His find expanded the knowledge of human evolution. Black presented this to the foundation, which granted him $80,000 ($1.5 million in 2025). This grant continued the investigation, and, with it, Black established the Cenozoic Research Laboratory .

Later, another excavator found a skull. More specimens were found. Black would frequently examine these late into the night.

Most of the original bones were lost in the process of shipping them out of China for safe-keeping during the beginning of World War II. The Japanese gained control of the Peking Union Medical Center during the war, where the laboratory containing all the fossils was ransacked and all the remaining specimens were confiscated. To this day, the fossils have not been found and no one is sure if they were stolen or legitimately lost. Only the plaster imprints remained, one at the PUMC, one at the Smithsonian in Washington, and one in London.

He was a member of the American Association for Anatomy.

== Asia hypothesis ==
Paleotontologists who believed human origins were to be found in Asia included Johan Gunnar Andersson, Otto Zdansky and Walter W. Granger. All three of these scientists were known for visiting China and for their work and discoveries by excavating the sites at Zhoukoudian that yielded the Peking Man (Homo erectus pekinensis). Further funding for the excavations was carried out by Davidson Black, a key proponent of the Asia hypothesis. Because of the finds in Zhoukoudian, such as Peking man, the focus of paleoanthropological research moved entirely to Asia, up until 1930.

Black wrote a paper in 1925, Asia and the dispersal of primates, which claimed that the origins of man were to be found in Tibet, British India, the Yung-Ling and the Tarim Basin of China. His last paper, published in 1934, argued for human origins in an Eastern Asian context.

== Honors and awards ==
In 1931, Black was awarded the Daniel Giraud Elliot Medal from the National Academy of Sciences.

The extinct genus Gigantopithecus blacki, first found in 1935, was named in his honour.

== Personal life ==
Davidson Black married Adena Nevitt in 1913. She accompanied him on his travels. They had two children: a son, Davidson (b. 1921, d. 1988), and a daughter, Nevitt (b. 1925, d. 2020). Both were born in Beijing.

The elder Davidson died of heart failure in 1934. G.E. Smith, the neuroanatomist he worked under, wrote his obituary.

Their son Davidson became a physician, earning his medical degree in 1946. Davidson married Lynne Sunderland in 1964 and had a son, Davidson (b. 1969, d. 2011), who died exactly 77 years after his grandfather died. Davidson died on 31 August 1988 aged 67.

Nevitt married John Maybee, a Canadian naval lieutenant on 4 August 1945. They had five children: John, Maylanne, Brenda, Chris Ryerson and Alan. Nevitt died on 1 February 2020 aged 94 and was survived by her children, twelve grandchildren and six great-grandchildren.

== Publications ==
- Black, D. (November 1932). "Skeletal Remains of Sinanthropus Other than Skull Parts*". Bulletin of the Geological Society of China. 11 (4): 365–374. doi:10.1111/j.1755-6724.1932.mp11004002.x.
- Black, D. (June 1932). "Evidences of the use of Fire by Sinanthropus*". Bulletin of the Geological Society of China. 11 (2): 107–108. doi:10.1111/j.1755-6724.1932.mp11002002.x.
- Black, D. (March 1931). "Palæogeography and Polar Shift. A Study of Hypothetical Projections". Bulletin of the Geological Society of China. 10 (1). Peiping. doi:10.1111/j.1755-6724.1931.mp10001006.x.
- Black, D. (June 1930). "Notice of the Recovery of a Second Adult Sinanthropus Skull Specimen". Bulletin of the Geological Society of China. 9 (2). Peiping: 97–100. doi:10.1111/j.1755-6724.1930.mp9002002.x.
- Black, D. (March 1930). "Interim Report on the Skull of Sinanthropus". Bulletin of the Geological Society of China. 9 (1): 7–10. doi:10.1111/j.1755-6724.1930.mp9001002.x.
- "Preliminary Notice of the Discovery of an Adult Sinanthropus Skull at Chou Kou Tien." Bulletin of the Geological Society of China, Vol. VIII, No. 3, 1929.
- Black, D. (March 1929). "Preliminary Note on Additional Sinanthropus Material Discovered in Chou Kou Tien During 1928". Bulletin of the Geological Society of China. 8 (1): 15–20. doi:10.1111/j.1755-6724.1929.mp8001003.x.
- "The Aeneolithic Yang Shao People of North China." Reprinted from the Transactions of the 6th Congress of the Far Eastern Association of Tropical Medicine. Tokyo, Japan, 1925.
- "Asia and the Dispersal of Primates." Reprinted From the Bulletin of the Geological Society of China, Vol. IV, No. 2., 1925.
- "A Note of the Physical Characters of the Prehistoric Kansu Race." from Memoirs of the Geological Survey of China, Series A, No. 5, June, 1925.
