= John Ryerson Maybee =

Canadian diplomat (1918–2009)

8th High Commissioner of Canada to India
- In office 13 June 1974 – 31 May 1977
- Monarch: Elizabeth II
- Prime Minister: Pierre Trudeau
- Preceded by: Bruce MacGillivray Williams
- Succeeded by: Robert Louis Rogers

4th High Commissioner of Canada to Nepal
- In office 13 June 1974 – 31 May 1977
- Monarch: Elizabeth II
- Prime Minister: Pierre Trudeau
- Preceded by: Bruce MacGillivray Williams
- Succeeded by: Robert Louis Rogers

1st Canadian Ambassador Extraordinary and Plenipotentiary to Syria
- In office 29 April 1965 – 1 August 1967
- Monarch: Elizabeth II
- Prime Minister: Lester B. Pearson
- Preceded by: Office established
- Succeeded by: Christian Hardy

1st Canadian Ambassador Extraordinary and Plenipotentiary to Jordan
- In office 2 December 1964 – 1 August 1967
- Monarch: Elizabeth II
- Prime Minister: Lester B. Pearson
- Preceded by: Office established
- Succeeded by: Christian Hardy

Canadian Ambassador Extraordinary and Plenipotentiary to Lebanon
- In office 11 June 1964 – 1 August 1967
- Monarch: Elizabeth II
- Prime Minister: Lester B. Pearson
- Preceded by: Paul André Beaulieu
- Succeeded by: Christian Hardy

Personal details
- Born: 29 August 1918 Moose Jaw, Saskatchewan, Canada
- Died: 20 May 2009 (aged 90)
- Resting place: National Military Cemetery, Beechwood, Canada
- Spouse: Nevitt Maybee (née Black)
- Children: 5
- Occupation: Diplomat, Royal Canadian Navy officer

John Ryerson Maybee (29 August 1918 – 20 May 2009) was a Canadian diplomat and Royal Canadian Navy officer.

Over his diplomatic career, he served as the Canadian ambassador to several countries, contributing to Canada’s foreign relations during the period following the Second World war.

== Early life and education ==
John Ryerson Maybee was born in Moose Jaw, Saskatchewan, and educated in Alberta, British Columbia, and at the University of Toronto. He later attended Princeton University, where he received his Ph.D. in Letters in 1942.

He married Nevitt Black, daughter of Davidson Black, on 4 August 1945 and had 5 children with her.

== Military service ==
Following his graduation, Maybee joined the Royal Canadian Navy during the Second World War, serving as a navigation officer on the North Atlantic.

The Battle of the Atlantic (1939–1945) marked the longest continuous battle of the war, with Allied and Axis forces contesting control over vital shipping routes. Canada played a role in escorting convoys across the Atlantic, and Maybee was among the Canadians who participated to ensure the safe passage of essential supplies to Europe.

== Diplomatic career ==
After the war, Maybee transitioned to a career in diplomacy, joining Canada’s Department of Foreign Affairs.

His career included postings in China, Australia and the United States.

His work as a diplomat extended to the Middle East and South Asia, where he served as Canada’s Ambassador Extraordinary and Plenipotentiary to Lebanon, Jordan, and Syria, as well as Canada's High Commissioner to India and Nepal.

== Later life and contributions ==
Upon retiring from his diplomatic career in 1978, Maybee studied journalism at Carleton University before becoming editor of Crosstalk, the newspaper of the Anglican Diocese of Ottawa. He remained active within his church, serving as a chorister, warden, and Sunday school teacher.

== Death and legacy ==
John Ryerson Maybee died on 20 May 2009, and was laid to rest in the National Military Cemetery at Beechwood.

== See also ==
- List of ambassadors and high commissioners of Canada
  - List of ambassadors of Canada to Syria
  - List of high commissioners of Canada to India
