= List of high commissioners of Canada to India =

High Commissioner for Canada in India
- Incumbent; Christopher Cooter since August 28, 2025
- Style: His Excellency
- Seat: High Commission of Canada, New Delhi
- Appointer: Governor in Council; on the advice of the minister of foreign affairs
- Term length: At His Majesty's pleasure
- Inaugural holder: John Doherty Kearney
- Formation: December 23, 1946
- Website: www.international.gc.ca/country-pays/india-inde/new_delhi.aspx?lang=eng

The high commissioner for Canada in the Republic of India is the official representative of the Government of Canada to the Government of India.

The current Canadian high commissioner is Christopher Cooter, who was appointed on the advice of Prime Minister Mark Carney on August 28, 2025. As members of the Commonwealth of Nations, diplomatic relations between Canada and India are at governmental level, rather than between heads of state. Thus, the countries exchange high commissioners, rather than ambassadors.

The High Commission of Canada is located at 7/8 Shantipath, Chanakyapuri, New Delhi 110 021, India.

== History of diplomatic relations ==
Diplomatic relations between Canada and India were established on April 6, 1945. John Doherty Kearney was appointed as Canada's first high commissioner in India on December 23, 1946, and presented his credentials on April 27, 1947.

== List of heads of mission ==
| No. | Name | Term of office | | | Career | Prime Minister nominated by | Ref. |
| No. | Name | Start Date | PoC. | End Date | Career | Prime Minister nominated by | Ref. |
|---|---|---|---|---|---|---|---|
| 1 | John Doherty Kearney | December 23, 1946 | April 27, 1947 | | Non-Career | W. L. Mackenzie King (1935–1948) | |
| 2 | Warwick Fielding Chipman | March 31, 1949 | December 16, 1949 | | Non-Career | Louis St. Laurent (1948–1957) | |
| 3 | Escott Meredith Reid | July 31, 1952 | November 21, 1952 | May 4, 1957 | Career | Louis St. Laurent (1948–1957) | |
| 4 | Chester Alvin Ronning | March 7, 1957 | | 1964 | Career | Louis St. Laurent (1948–1957) | |
| – | Edward Rose Rettie (Acting High Commissioner) | 1964 | | September 7, 1964 | Career | Lester B. Pearson (1963–1968) | |
| 5 | Daniel Roland Michener | July 9, 1964 | September 7, 1964 | April 12, 1967 | Non-Career | Lester B. Pearson (1963–1968) | |
| – | Douglas Barcham Hicks (Acting High Commissioner) | April 12, 1967 | | October 21, 1967 | Career | Lester B. Pearson (1963–1968) | |
| 6 | James George | July 17, 1967 | October 21, 1967 | August 20, 1972 | Career | Lester B. Pearson (1963–1968) | |
| 7 | Bruce MacGillivray Williams | June 8, 1972 | September 23, 1972 | July 2, 1974 | Career | Pierre Elliott Trudeau (1968–1979 & 1980–1984) | |
| 8 | John Ryerson Maybee | June 13, 1974 | September 26, 1974 | May 31, 1977 | Career | Pierre Elliott Trudeau (1968–1979 & 1980–1984) | |
| 9 | Robert Louis Rogers | July 14, 1977 | September 24, 1977 | August 23, 1979 | Career | Pierre Elliott Trudeau (1968–1979 & 1980–1984) | |
| 10 | John Gaylard Hadwen | April 4, 1979 | October 26, 1979 | August 25, 1973 | Career | Pierre Elliott Trudeau (1968–1979 & 1980–1984) | |
| 11 | William Thomas Warden | October 13, 1983 | | August 1986 | Career | Pierre Elliott Trudeau (1968–1979 & 1980–1984) | |
| 12 | James Gordon Harris | July 23, 1986 | October 9, 1986 | October 7, 1991 | Career | Brian Mulroney (1984–1993) | |
| 13 | John Lawrence Paynter | January 3, 1991 | | | Career | Brian Mulroney (1984–1993) | |
| 14 | Stanley Edward Gooch | August 16, 1994 | October 4, 1994 | September 1997 | Career | Jean Chrétien (1993–2003) | |
| 15 | Peter F. Walker | October 30, 1997 | November 27, 1997 | August 22, 2000 | Career | Jean Chrétien (1993–2003) | |
| 16 | Peter Sutherland | September 22, 2000 | October 23, 2000 | August 31, 2003 | Career | Jean Chrétien (1993–2003) | |
| 17 | Lucie Geneviève Edwards | July 31, 2003 | November 24, 2003 | August 2, 2006 | Career | Jean Chrétien (1993–2003) | |
| – | Ping M. Kitnikone (Consul General) | May 19, 2004 | | April 18, 2005 | Career | Paul Martin (2003–2006) | |
| 18 | David M. Malone | July 13, 2006 | September 12, 2006 | June 28, 2008 | Career | Stephen Harper (2006–2015) | |
| 19 | Joseph Caron | September 2, 2008 | November 10, 2008 | June 11, 2010 | Career | Stephen Harper (2006–2015) | |
| 20 | Stewart Beck | September 20, 2010 | December 8, 2010 | July 13, 2014 | Career | Stephen Harper (2006–2015) | |
| 21 | Nadir Patel | October 3, 2014 | January 16, 2015 | June 10, 2021 | Career | Stephen Harper (2006–2015) | |
| 22 | Cameron MacKay | December 20, 2021 | March 16, 2022 | | Career | Justin Trudeau (2015–2025) | |
| 23 | Christopher Cooter | August 28, 2025 | | | Career | Mark Carney (2025–) | |
