= List of ambassadors of Canada to Syria =

The ambassador of Canada to Syria, who holds the title of ambassador extraordinary and plenipotentiary, is Canada's foremost diplomatic representative in Syria, and in charge of Canada's diplomatic mission in the Syrian Arab Republic.

== List of heads of mission ==
List:

No.	Name	Term of office		
No.	Name	Appointment Date	PoC.	End Date
1	John Ryerson Maybee	29 April 1965	27 May 1965	1 August 1967
2	Christian Hardy	26 July 1967	6 November 1967	30 August 1969
3	Jacques Gilles Bruno Gignac	14 January 1970	23 February 1970	28 August 1974
4	Léopold Henri Amyot	10 June 1974	11 November 1974	7 January 1976
- (Chargé d'Affaires a.i.)	Alan William Sullivan (Note: In March 1976, Canada withdrew its diplomatic personnel, including the Chargé d’Affaires a.i., from its embassy in Beirut due to escalating instability in Lebanon. Despite the evacuation, diplomatic ties with Lebanon remained in place and were managed through the Canadian Embassy in Amman, Jordan, which was concurrently responsible for relations with both Jordan and Syria. From 4 September 1976 to 3 August 1977, Mr. Singleton was stationed in Amman. The Canadian Embassy in Beirut resumed operations in August 1977 under the leadership of a Chargé d’Affaires a.i., and in October of the same year, Mr. Couvrette was appointed ambassador.)	January 1976	-	September 1976
- (Chargé d'Affaires a.i.)	Howard Barham Singleton	September 1976	-	1 October 1977
5	Joseph Gilles André Couvrette	31 August 1977	29 December 1977	27 September 1978
6	Théodore Jean Arcand	21 December 1978	7 May 1979	7 August 1982
7	Robert David Jackson	22 September 1982	4 October 1983	1984
8	Keith William MacLellan (Note: As of 16 September 1984, the responsibility for Canadian diplomatic accreditation to Syria was officially transferred from the embassy in Lebanon to the one in Jordan. This shift came as part of a broader reorganization of Canada’s diplomatic missions in both countries, which included bolstering staff levels at the Jordanian post. Following this change, Keith William MacLellan, serving as Ambassador to Jordan, was also accredited to Syria while remaining based in Amman.)	18 October 1984		1985
9	Jacques Noiseux (Note: Canada established its embassy in Damascus in 1985, appointing Jacques Noiseux as its first resident ambassador to Syria. On 24 October 1986, the Canadian government announced the temporary recall of its ambassador, aligning with the United Kingdom's response and signaling disapproval of Syria's suspected involvement in terrorism. However, on 17 February 1987, it was confirmed that the ambassador would return to Damascus to resume diplomatic duties.)	28 August 1985	29 October 1985	7 July 1987
10	Gary Richard Harman	13 July 1987	4 January 1988	9 August 1990
11	David Martin Collacott	15 September 1990	18 December 1990	1993
12	John A. McNee	15 December 1993	22 December 1994	14 July 1997
13	Alexandra Bugailiskis	10 July 1997	30 May 1999	4 August 2000
14	Franco D. Pillarella	26 July 2000	23 November 2000	2003
15	Brian Davis	31 July 2003		2006
16	Mark Bailey	14 June 2006	3 October 2006	2008
17	Glenn Davidson	2 September 2008		5 March 2012
-	Vacant (Note: Canada closed its Embassy and Counsulate in Syria and severed diplomatic ties in 2012 with the onset of the Syrian Civil War. Shortly after the fall of the Assad regime, Canada started building back relations with Syria.)	5 March 2012	-	March 2025
18	Stefanie McCollum (Note: Resident in Lebanon.)	March 2025		Incumbent

== See also ==
- Canada–Syria relations
