= Sharif Ghalib =

Afghan diplomat (born 1961)

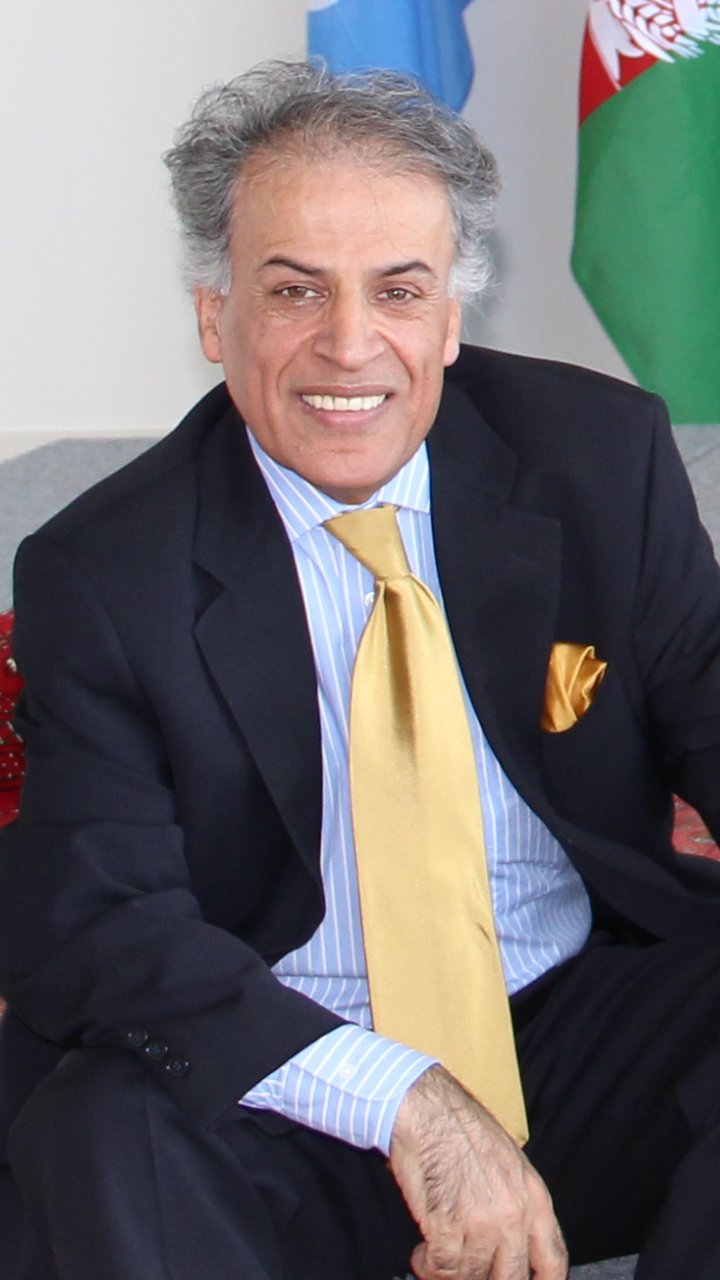
Sharif Ghalib

Sharif Ghalib is the executive director of the Ottawa Consultative Process (OCP) based in Ottawa, Canada. He has previously served as Chief Policy Advisor to the Minister of Foreign Affairs of Afghanistan. He formerly served as Deputy Chief of Mission (DCM) and Chargé d'affaires of the Embassy of Afghanistan in Ottawa, Canada. Prior to the posting, he served as Deputy Permanent Representative (DPR) and Chargé d'affaires to the United Nations Office in Geneva (UNOG) and Chargé d'affaires at the Embassy of Afghanistan in Bern, Switzerland.

Ghalib is the first Afghan diplomat to have represented Afghanistan in Canada.

== Education ==
Sharif Ghalib received his B.A. in Law and Political Science from Kabul University. He earned a master's degree in International Relations from Virginia Theological University (VTU) in 1997, and is currently pursuing an MBA in business and management at Laurentian University. Ghalib came to the United States under the USIA Internship and Exchange Program in 1990, where he completed an international intensive career development program in Broadcast Journalism conducted by the Center for Foreign Journalists in Reston, Virginia.

Sharif Ghalib was a participant in the senior Afghan leadership workshop organized by the Geneva Center for Security Policy (GCSP) in November 2011. He was also awarded a certificate for completion of a special workshop on charisma and leadership conducted by the United Nations Institute for Training and Research (UNITAR) in Switzerland in February 2012.

== Journalism ==
In the 1990s, Ghalib established and hosted Free Afghanistan Broadcasting, a multi-featured community TV show in New York. He was its executive producer for the subsequent three years, during which he earned a certificate in production and editing from Queens Public Television. He was a broadcaster and news anchor on national radio and television network prior to leaving Afghanistan.

== Representative to the UN ==
Sharif Ghalib joined the Afghan Foreign Service in 1994, and his diplomatic career started at the United Nations. He served for three consecutive terms at the Permanent Mission of Afghanistan to the United Nations as Second Secretary, First Secretary, and Counsellor from 1994 to 2002. Ghalib had been a member of the UNGA Drafting Committee of the annual resolutions on Afghanistan until 2001.

Ghalib has represented Afghanistan in numerous bilateral, regional and international meetings, conferences, and fora as head of delegation or as a member including the 50th UN Commemorative Meeting, the UN Millennium Summit, NAM Summit (Durban, South Africa), NAM Ministerial Conference (Cartagena-Colombia), FAO Summit (Rome-Italy), OIC Summit (Tehran, Iran), OIC Ministerial Conference (New York), ECO Ministerial Conference (Baku, Azerbaijan), G-77 Conference (Havana, Cuba), World Economic Forum Special Session (New York), and ICAO Ministerial Conference (Montreal, Canada), as well as seven UNGA regular sessions in New York. He was also a participant in the United Nations Human Rights Council considerations at its regular and special sessions and a member of Afghanistan's delegation on the country's bid for accession to the World Trade Organization during service in Geneva.

A member of the Intra-Afghan London Conference, Sharif Ghalib attended its successive deliberations on accentuating the national struggle through greater participation of Afghanistan's intelligentsia worldwide, convened in the United Kingdom, and was a participant in the U.S. Senate Foreign Relations Committee hearing on Afghanistan in Washington, D.C., in 1996.

He was also part of the UN-sponsored arrangements for transition to the post-Bonn Interim Authority in Afghanistan in 2001.

== Representative to Canada ==
In April 2002, Sharif Ghalib was appointed by the Afghan Interim Administration formed following the Bonn Agreement as Afghanistan's only representative and chief negotiator on the establishment of full bilateral diplomatic and consular relations between Afghanistan and Canada at the resident-embassy level.

The Embassy of Afghanistan was officially inaugurated on 29 October 2002 in Ottawa, where Ghalib served as chargé d'affaires ad interim and later Deputy Chief of Mission and Minister-counsellor until 2005.

In June 2003, Sharif Ghalib addressed the first Canadian military contingent at its Garrison Petawawa headquarters to be deployed to Afghanistan as part of the International Security Assistance Force (ISAF).

Drawing upon a successful initiative, the first of its kind, in late 2004, Sharif Ghalib signed an agreement with the Quebec-based Health Partners International of Canada and oversaw the shipment to Afghanistan of more than $2.1 million worth of medicine and medical supplies donated by 14 Canadian drug makers and medical supply manufacturers, which was later fostered as a multi-year program.

== Personal ==
Sharif Ghalib is a guest writer for the Asia Times Online and has written extensively on Afghanistan, the region, and world affairs with particular reference to the situation in Afghanistan and its implications for global peace and security. Co-founded and served as the President of the Toronto-based Canadian Afghan Council (CAC), Ghalib is an Honored member of Strathmore's Who's Who 2009 - 2010.

He and his wife have a daughter and a son.
