= Omar Samad =

Afghan diplomat

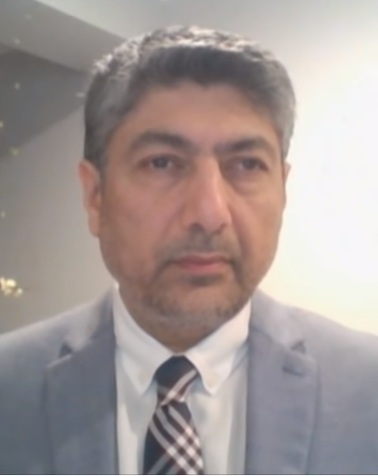
- Omar Samad on BBC Persian, 28 February 2019
- Education: American University; Tufts University
- Occupation: Diplomat
- Spouse: Khorshied Samad
- Children: 2

Omar Samad is the former Senior Advisor to Abdullah Abdullah, the former Chief Executive of Afghanistan from 2014 to 2020. He served as the Afghan Ambassador to Canada from 2004 to 2009, and to France from 2009 to 2011. He was a Senior Central Asia Fellow at the New America Foundation in Washington, D.C. 2013-14, after working as Senior Afghan Expert at the United States Institute of Peace in Washington D.C. 2012-13.

== Early life ==
Samad graduated from American University in Washington D.C., where he received a Bachelor of Arts degree in Communications and International Affairs in 1991. He received a Master's degree in International Relations (GMAP) from The Fletcher School of Law and Diplomacy at Tufts University in Massachusetts in 2006.

== Career ==
Samad worked in the IT private sector field in the US between 1981 and 2001 with corporations such as Datacrown Inc, Electronic Data Systems (EDS) and Washington Metropolitan Area Transit Authority (WMATA). Throughout the 1980s and 1990s, he advocated for freedom and democracy in Afghanistan. In 1996, he launched Azadi Afghan Radio and its website as part of the Afghanistan Information Center, based in Virginia. Following the September 11th attacks, he worked as a commentator and analyst for CNN during the Bonn Accords on Afghanistan.

He served as the Afghan Ambassador to Canada from October 2004 to June 2009, and to Ambassador to France from June 2009 to July 2011. He was accredited as the first Afghan non-resident Ambassador to the Chile (2008) and Principality of Monaco (2010). During his diplomatic career (2001 to 2011), he was a member of Afghan delegations to the UN, NAM, Islamic Conferences and specialized conferences on Afghanistan, including the Tokyo (2002) and Berlin (2004) reconstruction conferences. He represented the Foreign Ministry on the Tripartite Security Commission with Afghanistan-US-Pakistan. He was Afghanistan Senior Expert in residence at the United States Institute of Peace in Washington, D.C. from January 2012 till January 2013.

He was the spokesperson for the Ministry of Foreign Affairs in Kabul from December 2001 to September 2004 and Director General of the Information and Media Division, during which he also served as an advisor, speech-writer and member of the Ministry's reform committee.

He was a Senior Central Asia Fellow at the New America Foundation in Washington, D.C. and President of Silkroad Consulting LLC. before being appointed as Senior Advisor to the Chief Executive of Afghanistan in the National Unity Government formed after elections in 2014.

== Personal life ==
Samad is divorced from Khorshied Nusratty with whom he has two children, Soleiman and Arman.
