= Théodore Arcand =

Canadian diplomat (1934–2005)

Théodore Jean Arcand

Head of the Canadian Mission to the Holy See
- In office 24 August 1989 – 1993 (As 6th Ambassador Extraordinary and Plenipotentiary)
- Monarch: Elizabeth II
- Prime Minister: Brian Mulroney
- Preceded by: Eldon Pattyson Black
- Succeeded by: Léonard Hilarion Joseph Legault
- In office 9 April 1973 – 20 October 1973 (As Chargé d'Affaires)
- Monarch: Elizabeth II
- Prime Minister: Pierre Trudeau
- Preceded by: John Everett Robbins (As Ambassador Extraordinary and Plenipotentiary)
- Succeeded by: Paul Tremblay (As Ambassador Extraordinary and Plenipotentiary)

7th Canadian Ambassador Extraordinary and Plenipotentiary to Hungary
- In office 22 September 1982 – October 1985
- Monarch: Elizabeth II
- Prime Minister: Pierre Trudeau; John Turner; Brian Mulroney
- Preceded by: Dorothy Jane Armstrong
- Succeeded by: Robert L. Elliott

Canadian Ambassador Extraordinary and Plenipotentiary to Lebanon
- In office 21 December 1978 – 7 August 1982
- Monarch: Elizabeth II
- Prime Minister: Pierre Trudeau; Joe Clark; Pierre Trudeau
- Preceded by: Joseph Gilles André Couvrette
- Succeeded by: Robert David Jackson

6th Canadian Ambassador Extraordinary and Plenipotentiary to Syria
- In office 21 December 1978 – 7 August 1982
- Monarch: Elizabeth II
- Prime Minister: Pierre Trudeau; Joe Clark; Pierre Trudeau
- Preceded by: Joseph Gilles André Couvrette
- Succeeded by: Robert David Jackson

6th Canadian Ambassador Extraordinary and Plenipotentiary to Jordan
- In office 21 December 1978 – 7 August 1982
- Monarch: Elizabeth II
- Prime Minister: Pierre Trudeau; Joe Clark; Pierre Trudeau
- Preceded by: Joseph Gilles André Couvrette
- Succeeded by: Keith William MacLellan

Personal details
- Born: 25 June 1934 Bonnyville, Alberta, Canada
- Died: 16 April 2005 (aged 70) Montreal, Quebec, Canada
- Awards: Order of Knight Commander of St. Gregory The Great

Théodore Jean "Ted" Arcand (25 June 1934 – 16 April 2005) was a Canadian diplomat. He was Canada's Ambassador Extraordinary and Plenipotentiary to Lebanon, Syria, Jordan, Hungary, and the Holy See.

== Early life and career ==
Théodore Jean Arcand was born on 25 June 1934 in the town of Bonnyville, Alberta, Canada. He attended Université Laval in Quebec City from 1955 to 1956, then McMaster University in Hamilton, Ontario, in 1957. From 1957 to 1958, he worked in the Department of Citizenship and Immigration.

== Diplomacy career ==
His foreign policy career began in 1958 in the Department of External Affairs, now Global Affairs Canada. Over the course of the following two decades, he assumed various roles in several Canadian embassies in Africa and Europe.

In 1979, he was appointed as the Canadian ambassador to Lebanon, Syria and Jordan. In the 1982 Lebanon War, during the Israeli siege of Beirut, the Canadian embassy headed by Arcand became the only Western embassy still operating in west Beirut. For this reason, the embassy played an important role in receiving information from the Palestine Liberation Organization and sharing it with other Western nations, such as the United States, the United Kingdom, France and West Germany. On 28 July, a unanimous resolution at the House of Commons of Canada commended Arcand and his staff for their commitment. After Arcand's apartment was bombed by Israeli jets, the embassy was finally evacuated on 2 August.

In 1982 and 1983, Arcand was Canadian ambassador to Hungary. From 1989 to 1993, he was the ambassador to the Holy See. He received the Order of Knight Commander of St. Gregory The Great from Pope John Paul II. Arcand died on 16 April 2005 in Montreal, Quebec, Canada, at the age of 70.

== Personal life ==
Arcand was married to Jennifer Marjorie Garner-Ashmore. They had a son, Jean-Louis.

A polyglot, Arcand had studied Czech, Danish, Swahili, Italian, Arabic, and Hungarian.
