= Agency Co-ordinating Body for Afghan Relief =

Non-governmental organization

The Agency Coordinating Body for Afghan Relief - ACBAR - (Pashto: د افغانانو د پاره د مرستو د انسجام اداره / Persian: اداره هماهنگی کمک ها برای افغان ها) is a non-governmental organization (NGO) which was created to coordinate NGOs involved with humanitarian assistance in Afghanistan and for Afghan refugees in Pakistan.

== Background ==
ACBAR was created in August 1988, in response to the demand from the many aid agencies and their international donors for a coordinated approach to humanitarian assistance in Afghanistan and for Afghan refugees in Pakistan. The organization was originally based in Peshawar, Pakistan, where its main focus was coordinating NGOs' humanitarian response. Since it moved to Afghanistan, ACBAR provides the framework within which NGOs, the Afghan Government, the UN and bilateral donors can exchange information, share expertise and establish guidelines for a more coordinated, efficient and effective use of resources for aid to the Afghan people.
