= Keith MacLellan =

Canadian diplomat (1920–1998)

Keith William MacLellan
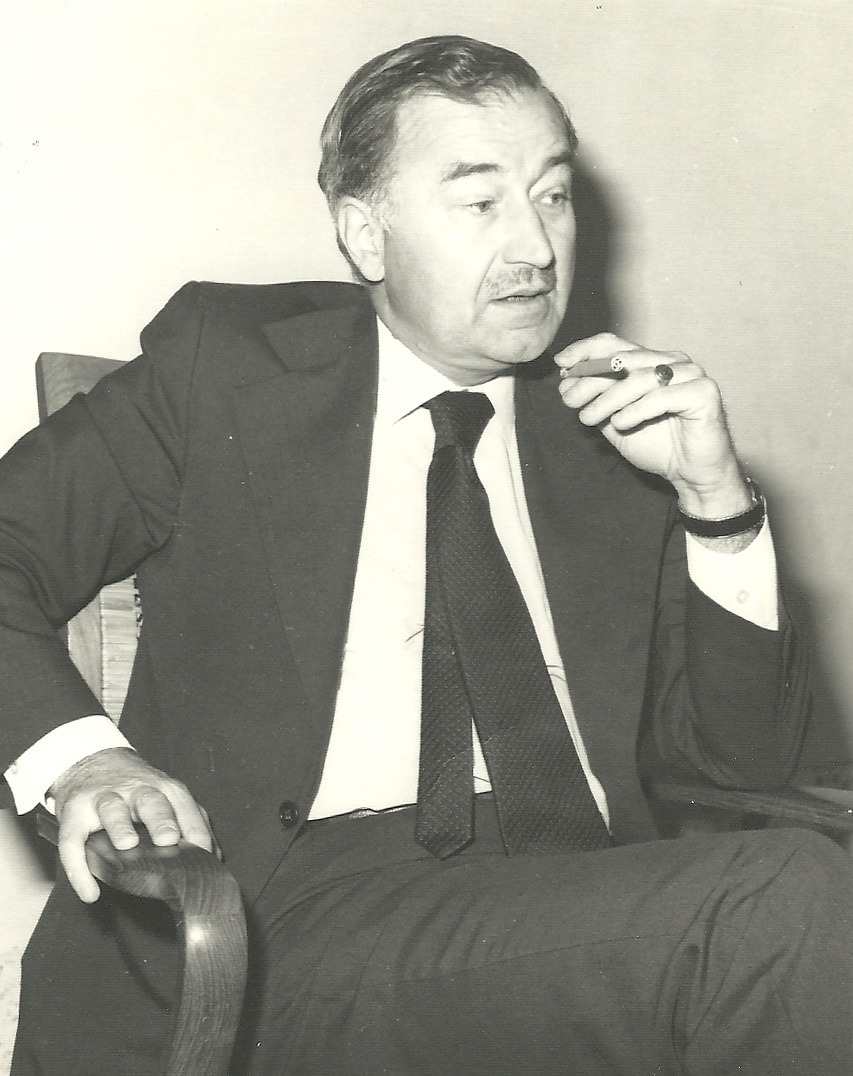
- Keith William MacLellan on a diplomatic mission

4th Canadian Ambassador Extraordinary and Plenipotentiary to Afghanistan
- In office 10 June 1974 – 12 July 1977
- Monarch: Elizabeth II
- Prime Minister: Pierre Trudeau
- Preceded by: John Gaylard Hadwen
- Succeeded by: William Frank Stone

Canadian Ambassador Extraordinary and Plenipotentiary to Pakistan
- In office 10 June 1974 – 12 July 1977
- Monarch: Elizabeth II
- Prime Minister: Pierre Trudeau
- Preceded by: John Gaylard Hadwen
- Succeeded by: William Frank Stone

Canadian Ambassador Extraordinary and Plenipotentiary to Yugoslavia
- In office 26 June 1977 – 10 June 1979
- Monarch: Elizabeth II
- Prime Minister: Pierre Trudeau; Joe Clark
- Preceded by: Robert Parke Cameron
- Succeeded by: James Gordon Harris

Canadian Ambassador Extraordinary and Plenipotentiary to Bulgaria
- In office 26 June 1977 – 10 June 1979
- Monarch: Elizabeth II
- Prime Minister: Pierre Trudeau; Joe Clark
- Preceded by: Robert Parke Cameron
- Succeeded by: James Gordon Harris

7th Canadian Ambassador Extraordinary and Plenipotentiary to Jordan
- In office 22 September 1982 – 1985
- Monarch: Elizabeth II
- Prime Minister: Pierre Trudeau; John Turner; Brian Mulroney
- Preceded by: Théodore Jean Arcand
- Succeeded by: Gary Richard Harman

8th Canadian Ambassador Extraordinary and Plenipotentiary to Syria
- In office 10 October 1984 – 1985
- Monarch: Elizabeth II
- Prime Minister: Brian Mulroney
- Preceded by: Robert David Jackson
- Succeeded by: Jacques Noiseux

Personal details
- Born: 30 November 1920 Aylmer, Quebec
- Died: 29 September 1998 (aged 77) Ottawa, Ontario

Keith William MacLellan (30 November 1920 – 29 September 1998) was a Canadian soldier, scholar, and diplomat who championed the cause of a federal, united Canada. He served as Ambassador to Pakistan and Afghanistan, Yugoslavia and Bulgaria, Jordan, and Syria.

== Personal life and education ==
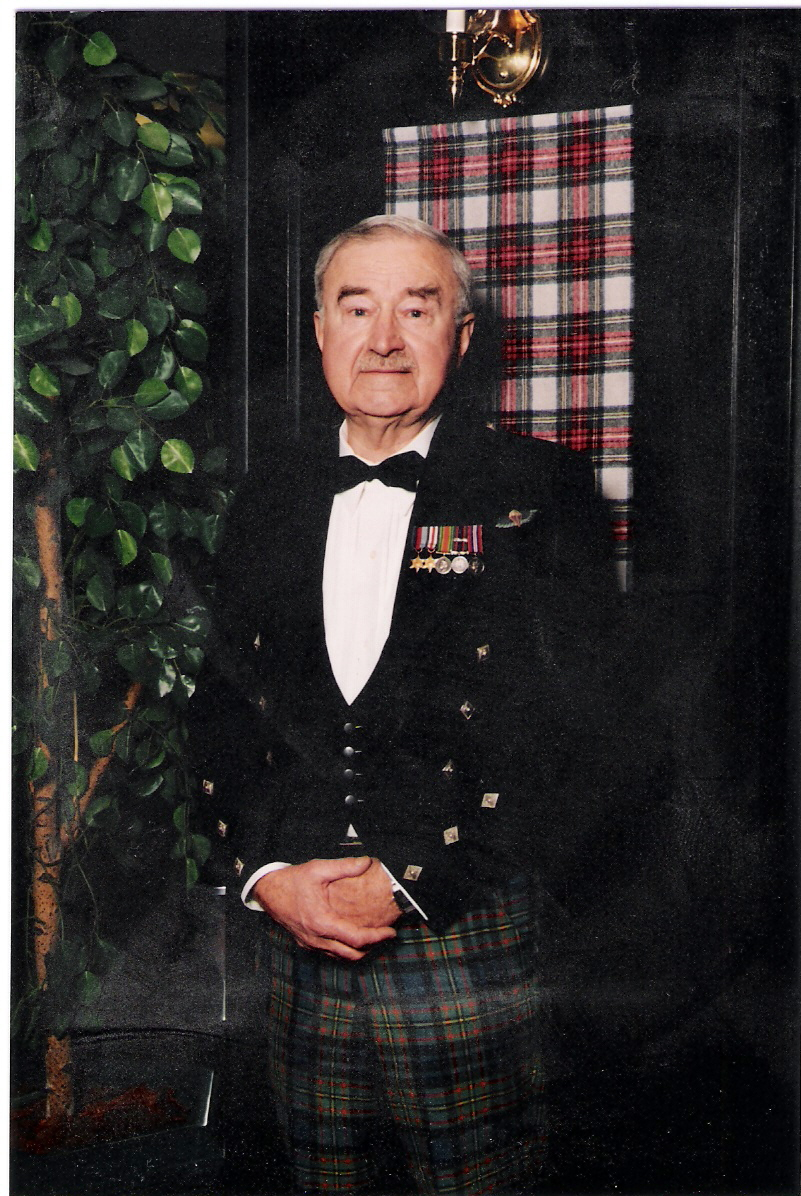
MacLellan in official outfit

MacLellan was born on 30 November 1920 in Aylmer, Quebec, the son of William David MacLellan and Edith Olmsted.

MacLellan grew up in Montreal, Quebec, where he studied political science and pre-law at McGill University. During his time as a student, he joined the Canadian Officers' Training Corps. In 1942, he helped John Sutherland and his sister found the First Statement, a Canadian literary magazine.

In 1942 MacLellan put his studies on hold to join the army, and shortly after he was sent overseas to the United Kingdom. During his deployment in Belgium in 1944 he met Countess Marie Antoinette LeGrelle, whom he married on 11 September 1946. Marie Antoinette belonged to the Le Grelle family, a line of nobles from Antwerp, Belgium. She was the daughter of Count Adelin Le Grelle and Rosalie de Swert; the niece of Count Jacques Legrelle, who helped organise the Comet Line.

Post-war, MacLellan studied philosophy, politics and economics at New College, Oxford, obtaining a Master's of Arts in 1947.

He joined Canada's Department of External Affairs in 1950.

== War years ==
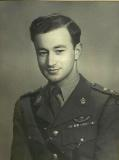
MacLellan in his Special Air Service uniform

Like many of his generation, his studies were interrupted by the war and he joined the Royal Montreal Regiment, with whom he trained, was commissioned as an officer and was sent to the United Kingdom. It was in the United Kingdom that he transferred to the 1st Special Air Service (1st SAS), becoming one of only two Canadians serving in the 1st SAS during the war. In this time, he was part of small jeep mounted units that operated behind enemy lines in Belgium, the Netherlands, Germany and Norway.

Although the precise details of MacLellan's operational service are not fully documented, he joined "A" Squadron, 1st Special Air Service, in 1944. He participated in operations behind German lines in Belgium, the Netherlands and Germany, and later served with the SAS in Norway following the German surrender.

It is also known that he was part of the SAS detachment that first liberated the Bergen Belsen concentration camp, which his unit discovered while operating ahead of the allied armies after the Rhine crossing.

It was during the liberation of Antwerp in 1944, that he first met Comtesse Marie Antoinette LeGrelle whom he married after the war as a student at Oxford.

== External Affairs ==
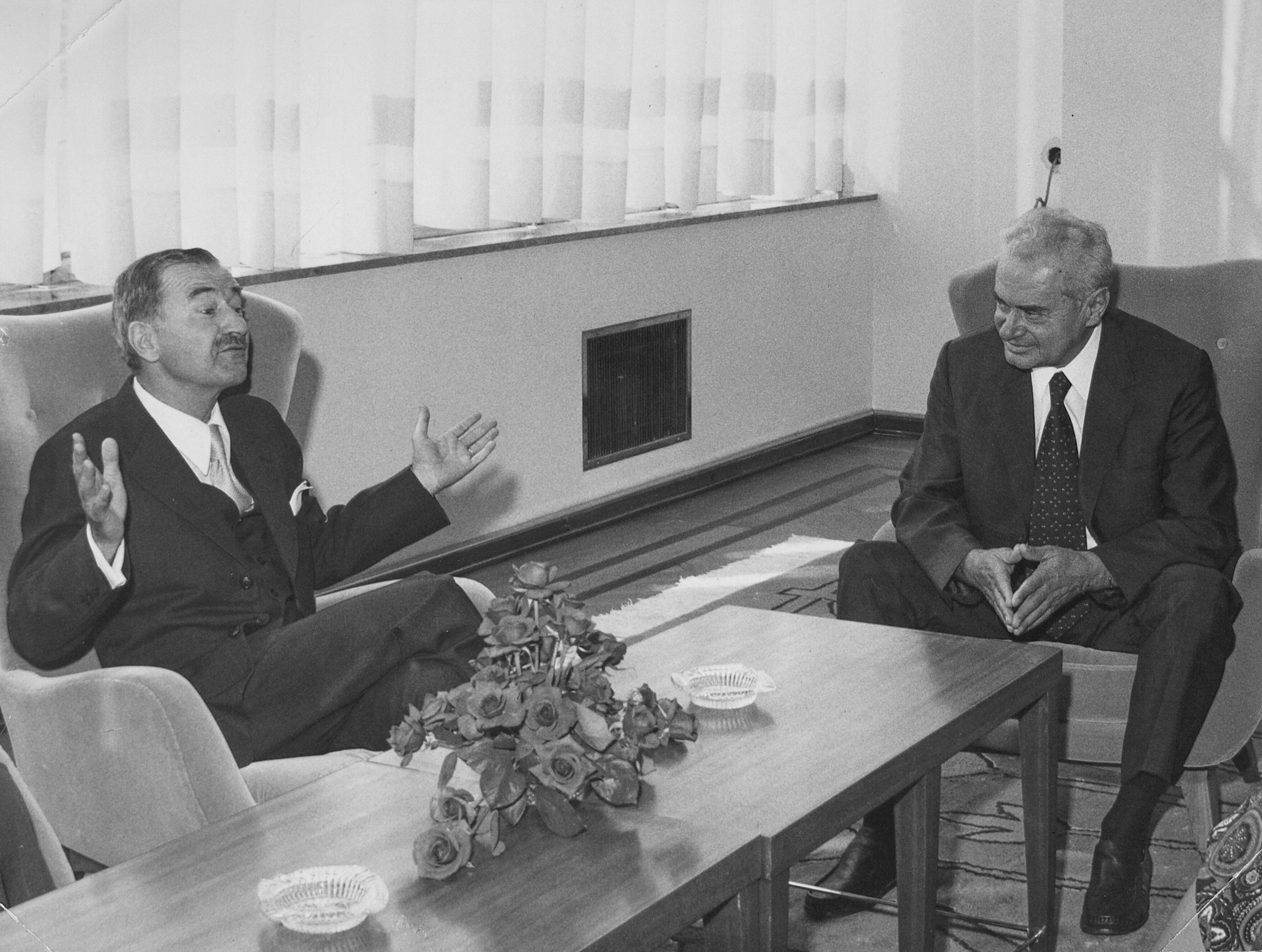
Keith W. MacLellan as ambassador to Yugoslavia between 1977 and 1979

Keith MacLellan joined the Department of External Affairs in 1950, and began a career in the Canadian Foreign Service that included diplomatic postings in Europe, Asia and the Middle East. He was part of a group of Canadian Foreign Service officers who helped shape Canada's post-war diplomatic efforts and policy.

The group represented a Canadian identity on the world stage that was, within the constraints of the Cold War, both allied with, yet independent from, the existing American and British identities. The group's ethos of "multilateralism" successfully defined Canada's separate identity while enabling it to exert influence through institutions such as the United Nations and the World Health Organization.

MacLellan's diplomatic career included postings in several countries experiencing significant political instability. From 1965 to 1966, he served as Canada's Commissioner to the International Commission for Supervision and Control in Laos. From 1974 to 1977, he served as Canada's ambassador to Pakistan and Afghanistan. He was subsequently ambassador to Yugoslavia and Bulgaria from 1977 to 1979.

== Negotiating a nuclear non-proliferation treaty with Pakistan ==
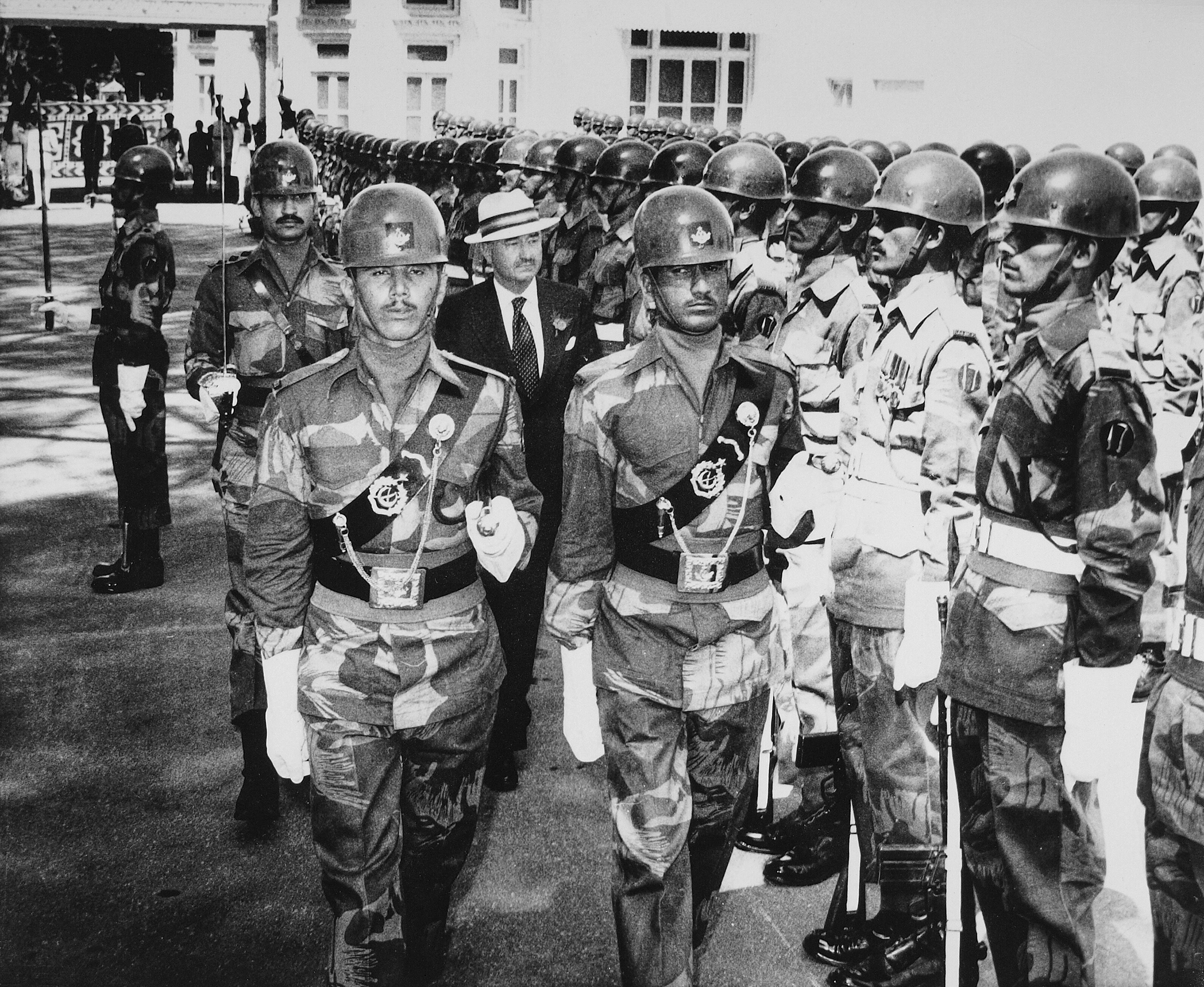
Keith William MacLellan as the ambassador of Canada in Pakistan

It was in Pakistan that Keith MacLellan faced his greatest diplomatic challenge, namely to try to get Pakistan and its then Prime Minister Zulfikar Ali Bhutto to sign up to the Nuclear Non-Proliferation Treaty and abandon its aim of manufacturing a nuclear bomb in response to India having exploded their own device, Smiling Buddha, on 18 May 1974.

Canada had what was believed at the time to be a trump card in the international effort to curb Pakistan's ambitions; namely the supply of uranium and technical support to Pakistan's Canadian manufactured KANUPP nuclear power plant. KANUPP was believed at the time to be Pakistan's only source of fissile material from which a bomb could be made. At the same time, matters were complicated by France agreeing to sell Pakistan a nuclear fuel reprocessing plant and technical expertise which would have the capability of turning the "spent fuel" from KANUPP into large quantities of weapons grade plutonium.

The task of bringing Prime Minister Bhutto to the negotiating table and obtaining an agreement fell on Keith MacLellan as Canada's representative in Pakistan.

Unfortunately, both Canada and the West had seriously underestimated Bhutto's determination to develop Pakistan's own bomb and the sacrifices that it was prepared to pay in order to do so. In fact, unknown to them, Bhutto had formally launched Pakistan's nuclear programme within 3 months of being elected Prime Minister in 1972 and subsequently accelerated the programme in 1974 by launching Project-706, which was later described by Time Magazine as "Pakistan's equivalent of the U.S.'s Manhattan Project". Part of this project involved developing the technology and expertise to produce and refine uranium from other sources than Canada.

As a result, the threat of Canadian sanctions on the KANNUP reactor were less of an ultimate deterrent than was believed at the time. Consequently, negotiations between Keith MacLellan and Prime Minister Bhutto finally broke down in 1976 and despite a State Visit to Ottawa by Bhutto, Canada withdrew its support for the reactor. This action however only resulted in a delay rather than a cessation of Pakistan's nuclear programme.

While accounts vary as to the length of the delay before Canadian uranium and expertise were replaced by domestic product, with some sources stating that the impact as little as two years, prior to the sanction Pakistan had initially projected having a working device by the early-mid 1980s, whereas it actually only detonated its first device in 1998.

== Postings abroad ==
MacLellan represented Canada in the following roles:

Duration	Location	Position
1953–1957	Berne, Switzerland	3rd Secretary
1958	Los Angeles, USA	Counsellor
1959–1963	Rome, Italy	First Secretary
1965–1966	Vientiane, Laos	Canadian Commissioner at the International Commission for Supervision and Control (ICSC/ICC)
1966–1967	London, England	1st Secretary / Interim High Commissioner
1967-1971?	Brussels, Belgium	1st Secretary/Charge D'Affaires
1974–1977	Pakistan and Afghanistan	Ambassador
1977–1979	Yugoslavia and Bulgaria	Ambassador
1982–1985	Jordan	Ambassador
1984–1985	Syria	Ambassador

== Politics ==
In 1979, MacLellan requested a leave of absence from the Department of External Affairs in order to run for Parliament and contribute to the federalist cause during the 1980 Quebec Referendum. When his request was denied, he resigned.

He returned to his hometown of Montreal to stand as the Progressive Conservative candidate for the riding of Lasalle in the 1979 federal election. MacLellan was defeated by Liberal incumbent John Campbell by a wide margin, receiving only 9.59% of the vote.

He subsequently rejoined the Department of External Affairs, where he was posted as Ambassador first to Jordan and then to Syria. MacLellan formally retired from the department in 1985.

In 1988, he ran for parliament once again in Saint-Henri—Westmount, however he was not successful. MacLellan received 39.29% of the vote, losing narrowly to Liberal candidate David Berger, who received 41.61%.

Despite not being elected to parliament, MacLellan continued to be involved in politics, devoting his later years to Canadian-Quebecois unity and the Scottish Clan MacLellan history. He was first elected as President of the St. Andrew's Society of Montreal, and later President of the St Andrew's Society of Ottawa. He also stood as the director of Clan MacLellan of America, and a convenor of the Franco-Scottish Society of Québec.

== Death ==
He passed away on 29 September 1998. He was survived by his four children, Dr. Keith MacLellan, Dr. Anne-Marie MacLellan, Janet MacLellan, and Andrew MacLellan.
