= Canada–Syria relations =

Bilateral relations

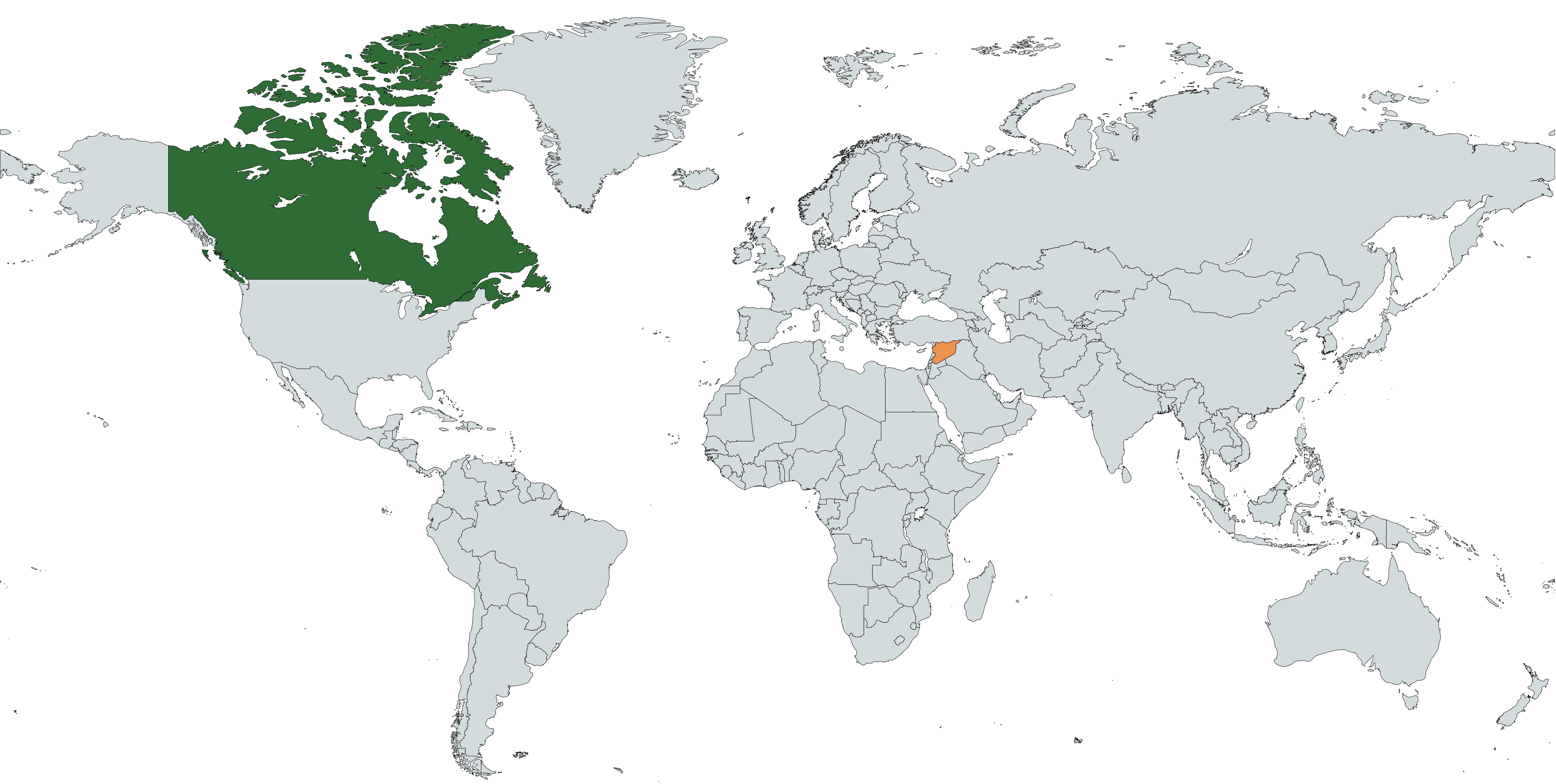

- Canada: Syria

Diplomatic mission
- Embassy, Damascus (Closed); Consulate, Aleppo (Closed): Embassy, Ottawa (Closed); Honorary Consulate, Montreal (Closed); Honorary Consulate, Vancouver (Note: Also responsible for Syrian interests in the United States.)

Envoy
- Stefanie McCollum (Note: Resident in Lebanon.): Abdulkader Husrieh

Canada–Syria relations were established on 20 May 1965, but were significantly affected by the Syrian Civil War. Post-war relations have begun to improve in alignment with other western nations.

== History ==
=== Ba'athist Syria ===
Canada and Ba'athist Syria opened embassies in each other's countries following the establishment of diplomatic relations in 1965. Relations became strained due to Ba'athist Syria's human rights issues and involvement in regional conflicts, and Canada's diplomatic stance shifted further with the outbreak of the Syrian civil war.

Canada closed its embassy in Damascus on 5 March 2012 and suspended formal diplomatic relations, while Syria's embassy in Ottawa was closed on 29 May 2012. For political reasons, the Syrian consulate in Montreal was closed in 2016.

As of November 2024, Syria still has an honorary consulate in Vancouver.

=== Post-Assad ===
After the collapse of the Ba'athist rule in Syria in December 2024, Canada welcomed the end of the Assad regime, and Syrian exiles across Canada celebrated its fall.

In March 2025, Canada has officially suspended economic sanctions against Syria and has appointed the ambassador to Lebanon, Stefanie McCollum, to be its non-resident ambassador to Syria.

In December 2025, Canada removed Syria from its list of foreign state supporters of terrorism and revoked the terrorist designation of Hay'at Tahrir al-Sham, while maintaining targeted sanctions on former regime officials.

== Humanitarian aid ==
Canada has been an active humanitarian donor during the Syrian crisis, contributing funds for Syrian refugees and internally displaced persons. Canada is one of the largest resettlement countries for Syrian refugees, admitting tens of thousands since the beginning of the war.

== Political positions ==
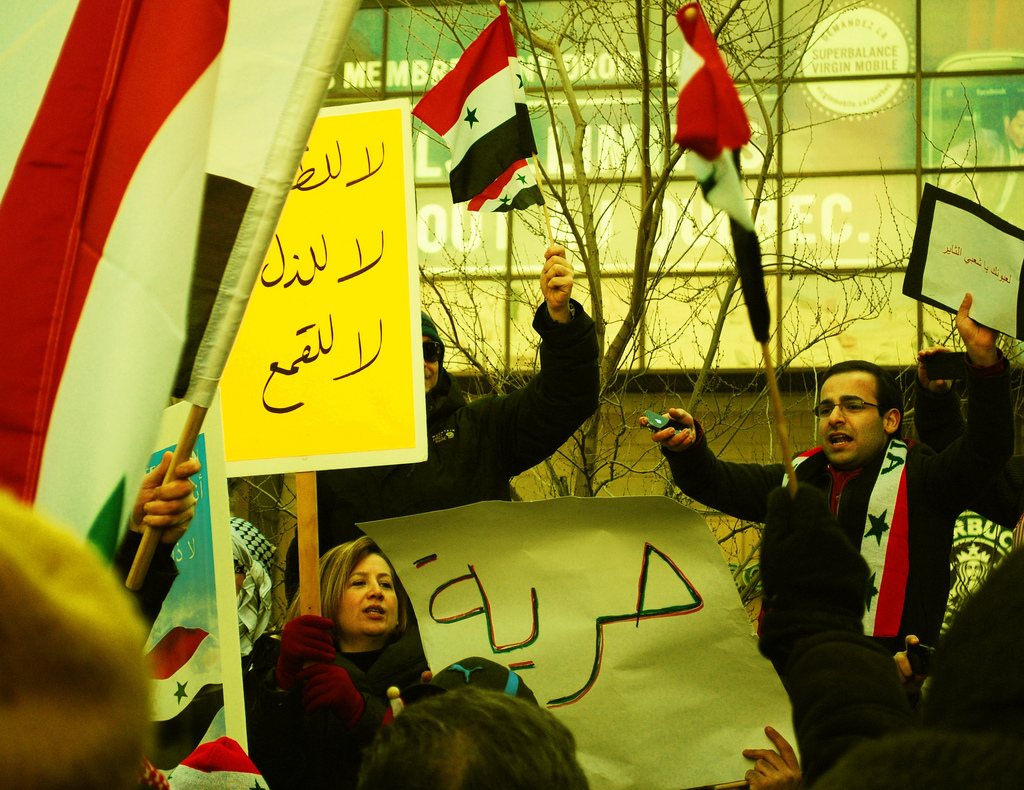
Syrian solidarity demonstration in Montreal, March 2011.

Canada imposed sanctions on Assad regime officials and institutions in response to human rights abuses. It has also supported international efforts to seek accountability for war crimes in the Syrian Civil War.

== See also ==
- List of ambassadors of Canada to Syria
- Syrian Canadians
- Foreign relations of Canada
- Foreign relations of Syria
