= Glenn V. Davidson =

Canadian admiral (born 1952)

Glenn Victor Davidson
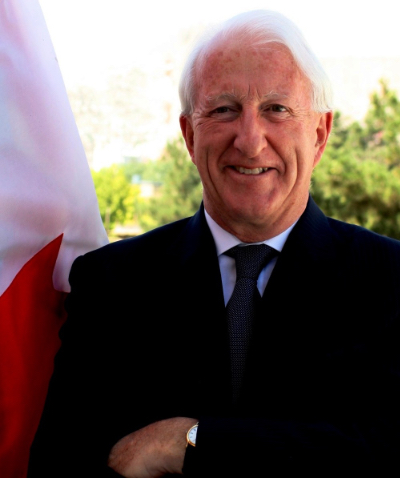
- Davidson in 2013
- Born: 1952 (age 73–74); Truro, Nova Scotia
- Military career
- Allegiance: Canada
- Branch: Royal Canadian Navy
- Service years: 1970–2008
- Rank: Vice Admiral
- Commands: HMCS Kootenay; Maritime Operations Group Two; Maritime Forces Atlantic
- Awards: Commander of the Order of Military Merit; Canadian Forces' Decoration
- Other work: Canadian Military Representative to NATO 2004–2008

Vice-Admiral Glenn Victor Davidson CMM CD (born 1952) is a retired senior naval officer who served in the Canadian Forces.

== Military career ==
Davidson joined the Naval Reserve in 1970 and transferred to the regular force in 1974 after completing his studies at the University of King's College in Halifax. Specialising in navigation and air control, Davidson saw service in the Atlantic Ocean|Atlantic and Pacific Oceans, as well as undertaking various staff and headquarters appointments before taking command of HMCS Kootenay (DDE 258) in 1989.

Davidson remained in command of Kootenay until 1991. After a posting to the Canadian Embassy in Tokyo, Japan as defence attache from 1992 to 1995 he was appointed Commander of Maritime Operations Group Two in the Pacific, which included seven frigates and destroyers and an operational support ship. In 1997 he was promoted to commodore and took up the post of Direct General Naval Personnel in Ottawa. He was promoted to rear admiral in 2000 and became Chief of Staff Human Resources Military. In both positions he was deeply involved in military quality of life, recruiting, retention, military health and veterans' care issues. He was appointed Commander of the Order of Military Merit in 2002.

Between 2002 and 2004 Davidson commanded Maritime Forces Atlantic, which encompassed some 10,000 sea-going and shore-based naval and civilian personnel. He was named citizen of the year by the Halifax Chamber of Commerce in 2003 and received the DM/CDS innovation award for his personal launch of the civilian workforce renewal initiative in 2004. In 2004 he was appointed the Canadian Military Representative to the NATO Military Committee in NATO Headquarters Brussels. He held this post until 2008.

== Diplomatic career ==
From September 2008 to March 2012, Davidson served as Ambassador of Canada to the Syrian Arab Republic, a period which included Syria's descent into civil war.

He closed the Canadian Embassy in Damascus in March 2012. In May 2012 he was appointed as Ambassador of Canada to the Islamic Republic of Afghanistan and remained in that position until July 2013 when he returned to Canada.

== Awards and decorations ==
Davidson's personal awards and decorations include the following:

Ribbon	Description	Notes
	Order of Military Merit (CMM)	Appointed Commander (CMM) on 3 October 2001
	Queen Elizabeth II Silver Jubilee Medal	Decoration awarded in 1977; Canadian version
	Queen Elizabeth II Golden Jubilee Medal	Decoration awarded in 2002; Canadian version
	Canadian Forces' Decoration (CD)	with two Clasp for 32 years of services

== Arms ==
Coat of arms of Glenn V. Davidson
Notes The arms of Glenn V. Davidson consist of: Crest Issuant from a naval coronet Or a demi lion Vert holding a sprig of three maple leaves Or. Helm In modern Canadian heraldry, helmets have no fixed meaning, though the Canadian Heraldic Authority avoids using helmets that imply rank in other heraldic traditions. Thus, the all steel helmet in profile is purely stylistic. Escutcheon Vert a chevron embowed between three escallops Or. Supporters Two griffins Vert beaked, winged and membered Or. Compartment A bed of mayflowers proper. Motto Revereor Praeterita Paro Futura (Latin for 'Respect the past; prepare for the future') Orders Order of Military Merit: OFFICIUM ANTE COMMODUM (Latin for 'Service before self')
