= Canada–Israel relations =

Bilateral relations between Canada and Israel

- Canada: Israel

Diplomatic mission
- Embassy of Canada, Tel Aviv: Embassy of Israel, Ottawa

Envoy
- Ambassador Leslie Scanlon: Ambassador Iddo Moed

Canada and Israel share bilateral diplomatic, commercial, and cultural ties. Canada recognised Israel on 11 May 1949, three days before the first anniversary of the Israeli Declaration of Independence, and currently maintains an embassy in Tel Aviv; Israel maintains an embassy in Ottawa, at 50 O'Connor Street, and regional consulates in Montreal and Toronto.

== Early history ==
In the 1930s, as tensions rose between the Arab and Jewish populations of Mandatory Palestine, restrictions were placed by the British authorities on Jewish immigration to the region. During this time, Canadian prime minister Mackenzie King, who has been accused of harbouring latent anti-Semitism during his lifetime, passively accepted the British anti-immigration policies in the Mandate. In general, the immigration of Jews to the Holy Land was not met with opposition or concern in Canada; however, institutions and groups such as the Roman Catholic Church in Quebec expressed hostility toward Jews and Zionism, largely on the basis of existing theological prejudices.

In 1947, as a representative on the United Nations Special Committee on Palestine (UNSCOP), Canada was among the 33 countries that voted in favour of the Partition Plan for Palestine, which aimed to split the British Mandate into an Arab state and a Jewish state with an internationalised Jerusalem. Despite heavy pressure from the United Kingdom on the Commonwealth of Nations to abstain during the vote, the Partition Plan was adopted by the United Nations General Assembly with a majority of the representatives in favour. While the Partition Plan could not be implemented as intended due to the outbreak of a civil war in the territory, the State of Israel emerged with an agreed border by 1949.

Canada granted de facto recognition to Israel in December 1948 and full de jure recognition on 11 May 1949 after the Jewish state was admitted into the United Nations as a member state. One week later, Avraham Harman was appointed as Israel's first Consul-General to Canada. In September 1953, a Canadian embassy was opened in Tel Aviv, and Michael Comay was appointed as the Israeli ambassador to Canada; a Canadian ambassador to Israel was appointed in 1958.

== Diplomatic relations in the 20th century ==
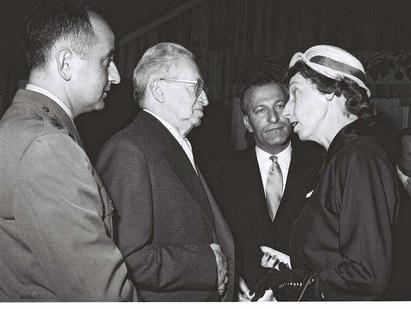
Margaret Meagher, Canadian ambassador to Israel, 1959

In May 1961, David Ben-Gurion was the first Israeli Prime Minister to make an official visit to Canada. Since then, officials from both countries have made frequent trips. Members of Parliament, Cabinet Ministers and Justices of the Supreme Court of Canada have visited, Israel demonstrating the ever strengthening relationship and cooperation. In addition, the premiers of Manitoba, Prince Edward Island, Ontario and Alberta and cabinet ministers from other provinces, have led successful commercial and cultural missions to Israel. A number of Canadian municipalities are twinning with Israeli cities. In 1957, after the Sinai Campaign, Lester Pearson, the Secretary of State for External Affairs, received the Nobel Peace Prize for successfully leading the process by which UN peace keeping troops were stationed along the border between Israel and Egypt. Canadian troops also played a central role in the United Nations Emergency Force (UNEF). This role is part of the wider Canadian commitment to efforts designed to end the Arab-Israel conflict. Later, in the late 1970s, Canada encouraged the peace negotiations between Israeli Prime Minister Menachem Begin and Egyptian President Anwar Sadat, and Begin stopped in Canada and met with Prime Minister Pierre Trudeau in 1977.

In general, while diplomatic relations were cordial, they were not particularly close during this period. A number of Canadian diplomats, like their European counterparts, tended to support the Arab positions against Israel in the United Nations and other frameworks. The Canadian Arabists, such as Ambassador Michael D. Bell, sought to align policy with the Arab states in order to promote commercial interests, and to gain Arab support for Canadian candidates and positions, in the United Nations. These positions generated considerable friction with Israel.

In the 1970s, the issue of Canadian complicity in the Arab economic warfare against Israel became an issue, particularly as cooperation with the boycott was illegal in the U.S., and was inconsistent with Canada's declaratory role as a global peace-maker. Ontario and Manitoba adopted anti-boycott policies, leading Prime Minister Pierre Trudeau to consider federal legislation to prohibit Canadians and Canadian companies from cooperating with the Arab economic boycott of Israel. When corporate interests dealing with Arab and Muslim opposed the legislation, fearing a backlash, Trudeau allowed the legislation to die.

During Brian Mulroney's time in office, Canada's support for Israel received strong public endorsement during the Gulf War, during which Iraqi missiles were fired into Israel from occupied Kuwait. Canadian forces were part of the United States-led coalition against Ba'athist Iraq during this time.

In the multilateral negotiations that took place after the 1991 Madrid Conference, Canada agreed to head the multilateral working group on Palestinian refugee issues. Although a number of meetings were held and different options were discussed, no agreements were reached. In 1995, the multilateral talks reached an impasse.

Since 1995, Palestine has had a diplomatic delegation, the Palestinian General Delegation to Canada, in Ottawa. This flowed from the decision of the Jean Chretien government in support of the Oslo Accords.

== Diplomatic relations in the 21st century ==
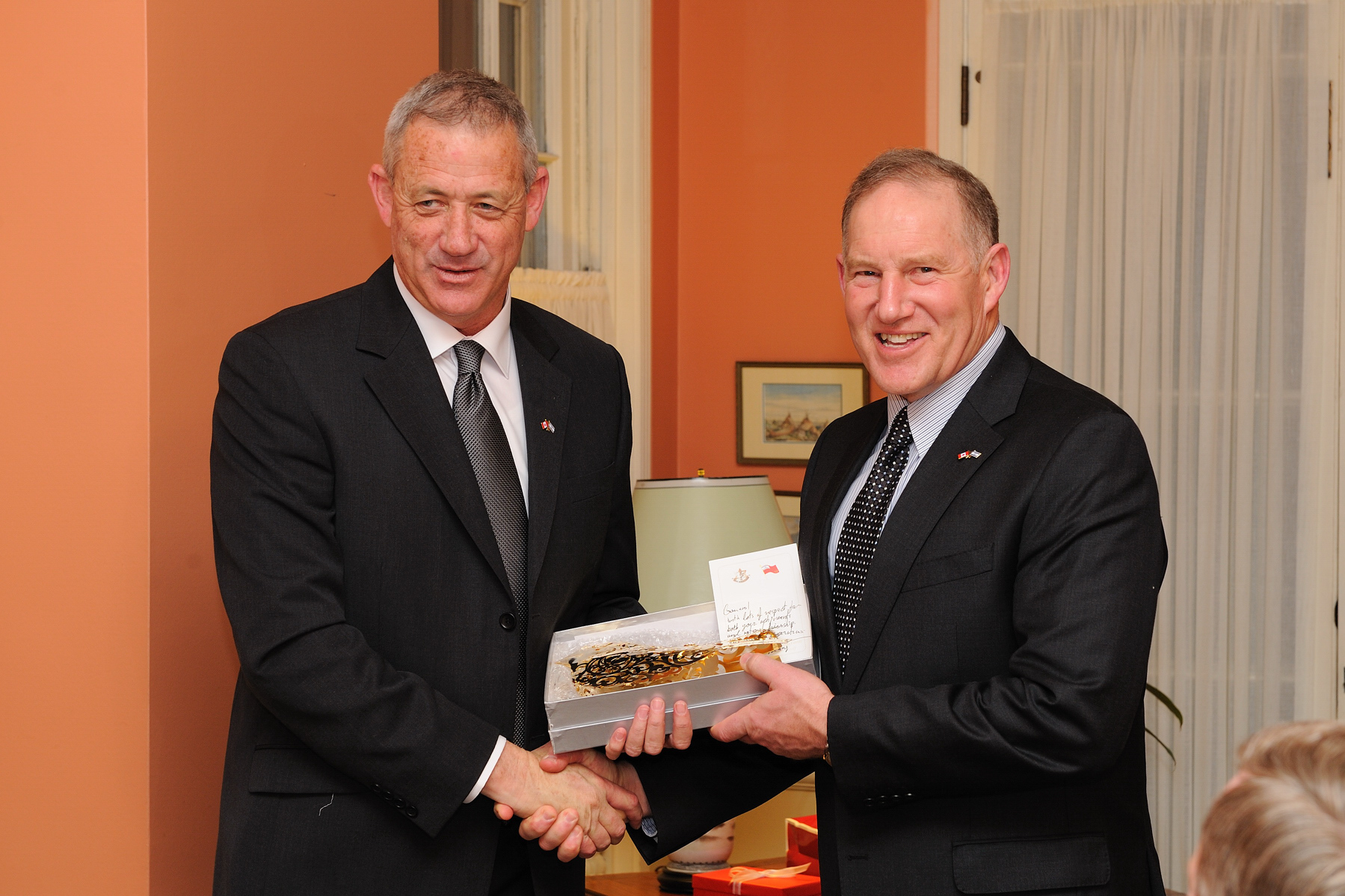
Former Israeli Chief of General Staff Benny Gantz with former Canadian Chief of Defense Staff Walter Natynczyk, 2012

The Harper government played a direct role in forming policy for the region, seeking to adjust the positions to be in conformity with the principles of the Conservative majority. Consequently, diplomats who promoted anti-Israel or Arabist policies lost influence.

As anti-Israel political movements spread to Canada, including at university campuses through events such as Israeli Apartheid Week (IAW), Canadian government officials and members of parliament from different parties expressed opposition. In 2010, Conservative MP Tim Uppal introduced a motion in the Canadian House of Commons that condemned IAW "for seeking to delegitimize the State of Israel by equating it with the racist South African apartheid regime." NDP and Bloc Québécois members refused to agree to its unanimous passage. The Bloc submitted its own motion, which also criticised use of the word "apartheid" but added a clause, stating not every criticism of Israel is anti-Semitic. The result was that all parties, with the exception of some NDP members, denounced Israeli Apartheid Week.

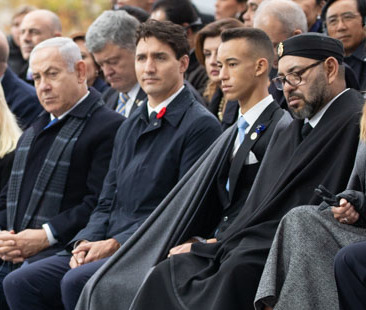
Canadian Prime Minister Justin Trudeau, Israeli Prime Minister Benjamin Netanyahu and King Mohammed VI of Morocco, 11 November 2018

On 29 April 2009, to mark the 61st anniversary of the State of Israel, PM Stephen Harper said "We count ourselves among Israel's closest partners. Since its founding, Canada has supported Israel and its right to live in peace and security with its neighbours. We value this relationship and look forward to continued friendship and collaboration."

In a magazine interview published 12 February 2010, Environment Minister Peter Kent said: "Prime Minister Harper has made it quite clear for some time now and has regularly stated that an attack on Israel would be considered an attack on Canada."

Following the return of the Liberal Party to power under Prime Minister Justin Trudeau in 2015, relations between Canada and Israel remained largely unchanged. In September 2016, Trudeau headed the Canadian delegation to the state funeral of Israeli leader Shimon Peres, and in his condolence message, stated: "Mr. Peres was an internationally-respected statesman and a great friend to Canada. He visited our country often, and helped build relations that remain strong to this day."

On 7 October 2023 occurred the Hamas-led attack on Israel. The day after the Hamas-led attack on Israel, Trudeau issued a statement condemning Hamas’ attack and affirming Israel’s right to defend itself while maintaining international law. On 24 October 2023, Trudeau rejected calls for a ceasefire in the Gaza War but said he supported "humanitarian pauses" to deliver aid to the people of the Gaza Strip. However, on 14 November 2023, Trudeau urged Israel to stop "this killing of women, of children, of babies" in the Gaza Strip. His statements were subsequently criticized by Israeli Prime Minister Benjamin Netanyahu. Over the course of the war, Canada implemented an arms embargo on Israel and issued sanctions against several Israeli settlers and organizations, citing West Bank violence. Trudeau neither endorsed nor rejected South Africa's genocide case against Israel. In 2024, Trudeau stated that Canada would "abide" by the International Criminal Court (ICC) investigation in Palestine's issuing of an arrest warrant for Netanyahu if he entered the country.

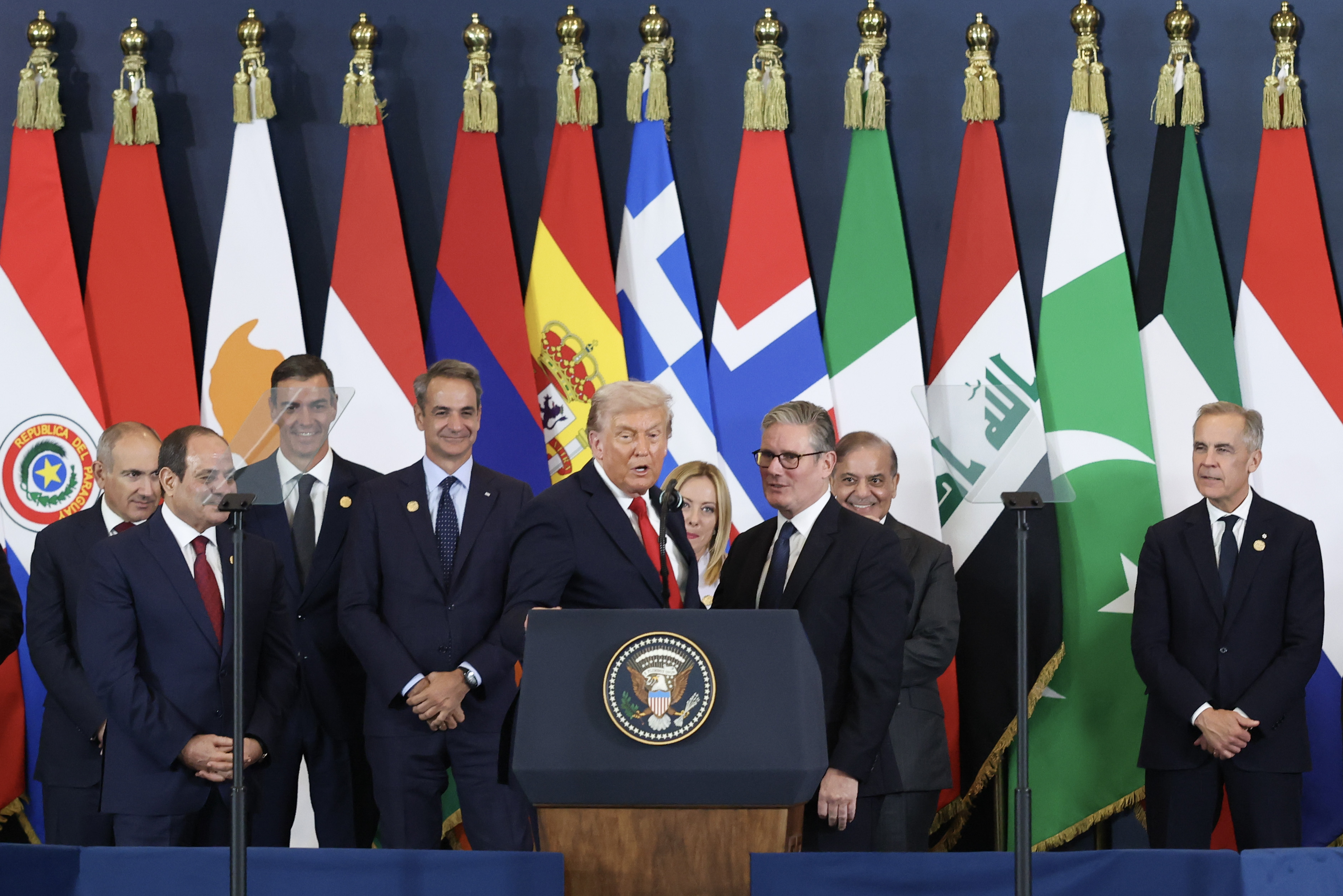
Prime Minister Mark Carney (right) at the Gaza peace summit in Sharm El Sheikh, Egypt on 13 October 2025

In February 2025, Israeli Defense Minister Israel Katz suggested that some Palestinians from Gaza should immigrate to Canada because Canada has a "structured immigration program". In April 2025, Prime Minister Mark Carney disagreed with the accusation that Israel was committing genocide in Gaza.

In May 2025, Canada summoned the Israeli ambassador to Canada Iddo Moed after Israeli forces fired warning shots towards a diplomatic delegation that included four Canadians, during a visit in Jenin. In an interview with CBC News, Moed claimed that the diplomats may have been "led astray." In an interview with Global News, he stated that Canada–Israel relations were in a "new atmosphere." Prime Minister Carney described the shooting as "totally unacceptable: it's one of many things that are totally unacceptable going on in the region.", with political commentators viewing the relationship between the two countries as breaking down. On 19 May 2025, Canada, along with Britain and France, issued a joint statement condemning Israel's "egregious" actions in Gaza. They warned of the possibility of "further concrete actions" if Israel continued its military offensive and failed to lift restrictions on humanitarian aid. In June 2025, Carney compared the Israeli invasion of the Gaza Strip and occupation of the West Bank to the Russian invasion of Ukraine.

In October 2025, Carney confirmed that Canada would fulfill its commitments to the International Criminal Court (ICC) and stated that, should Israeli Prime Minister Benjamin Netanyahu enter Canadian territory, he would be detained.

In May 2026, the Israeli ambassador to Canada stated that Canada-Israel relations were "the worst it’s ever been". The Canadian government had warned Israel against an invasion of Lebanon and sharply criticized the governments treatment of activists on a humanitarian aid flotilla bound for Gaza. The following month, the Canadian Ministry of Foreign Affairs announced further sanctions against what it described as facilitators of "extremist settler violence" in the West Bank.

== Israeli foreign interference in Canada ==
Israeli agents working for the Mossad are widely believed to be responsible for the assassination of Gerald Bull, a Canadian engineer, in Brussels, Belgium in 1990.. Allegations of an Israeli disinformation campaign in Canada using Artificial Intelligence to influence the public in supporting Israel's war in Gaza emerged in 2024. Chrystia Freeland, the deputy Prime Minister, described the actions as 'not acceptable.' In 2026, it was reported that Israel was sponsoring an anti-BDS lawfare program that involved Canadian lawyers. This program was reported to be in violation of Canadian foreign interference laws.

== Canada, Israel, and the United Nations ==
Canada's activities and policies in the United Nations arena are generally a major expression of and component of its foreign policy, and the issues surrounding Israel receive disproportionate attention in the UN, due largely to the hostility of the Arab League and the Organisation of Islamic Cooperation, which form the largest voting bloc in the international body. In 1947, Canada was represented on the United Nations Special Committee on Palestine (UNSCOP), and was among the 33 countries that voted in favour of the 1947 UN partition resolution, which led to the establishment of the State of Israel.

In 1956 the Secretary of State for External Affairs of Canada Lester B. Pearson was instrumental in forming the United Nations Emergency Force in the First Emergency Special Session of the United Nations General Assembly. These peacekeepers were the first of their kind, and directed against the French, British and Israeli forces who sought to maintain the status quo in the Suez Crisis.

In order to avoid conflict and criticism from the oil-rich Arab countries, and reflecting the advice of the Arabists among the Canadian diplomatic corps, such as Michael D Bell for many years, Canada either abstained or joined in voting against the numerous anti-Israel resolutions, in contrast to the United States, which voted with Israel. For many In the 1990s, the friction between Canada and Israel increased over this issue.

This policy changed under the Harper government, which voted more on the basis of support for and identification with Israeli democracy. On many anti-Israel resolutions introduced annually in the UN, Canada began to vote with Israel, the US, and Australia, and not with the Arab and Islamic blocs. For example, in the 2011 General Assembly Canada voted against a series of one-sided and strictly political resolution promoting "solidarity" with the Palestinians.^{[12]}

In October 2010, Canada lost to Portugal in a vote for a seat at the Security Council, which has been attributed by some to the Arab and Islamic bloc's effort to punish Ottawa for not supporting anti-Israel agendas at the UN. At a conference on combating anti-Semitism in Ottawa, 8 November 2010, Canadian PM Harper said, "I know, by the way, because I have the bruises to show for it, that whether it is at the United Nations, or any other international forum, the easiest thing to do is simply to just get along and go along with this anti-Israeli rhetoric […] There are, after all, a lot more votes — a lot more — in being anti-Israeli than in taking a stand. But, as long as I am prime minister, whether it is at the UN or the Francophonie or anywhere else, Canada will take that stand, whatever the cost."

In 2016, Prime Minister Justin Trudeau announced that in 2020, Canada would seek election to the Security Council, raising concerns that in order to get support from the 57-nation Organization of Islamic Cooperation bloc, Ottawa would return to policies and votes for resolutions that targeted Israel.

In May 2024, Canada abstained from a vote for recognition of Palestinian statehood at the UN.

== Trade relations ==
Canada exports agricultural products and raw materials to Israel, which, in turn, exports diamonds, textiles, clothing, and food products to Canada. On 31 July 1996, Canada and Israel signed a free trade agreement, called the Canada-Israel Free Trade Agreement (CIFTA). It came into effect on 1 January 1997. Bilateral trade subsequently increased to $1.24 billion by 2005.

In 2012, Joe Oliver, Canadian Minister of Natural Resources, and Uzi Landau, the former Israeli Minister of Energy and Water Resources, announced the creation of the Canada-Israel Energy Science and Technology Fund to spur the development of energy technologies and processes for the development of unconventional oil and gas resources. The Fund is expected to generate $20 to $40 million in collaborative research and development over a period of three years. Two Canadian R & D workshops took place in March 2013, bringing together leading Canadian and Israeli stakeholders.

In September 2019, following four years of negotiations, the updated version of CIFTA entered into force, following ratification by both governments. The new agreement included Israeli access to Canada for the sales of produce and grain products, as well as wines. Israel agreed to tariff exemptions for Canadian companies in the realm of agricultural, agri-food and fisheries products. Clauses on women's rights and gender equality in trade were also included. The volume of bilateral trade between Israel and Canada in 2018 was $1.1 billion, consisting primarily of chemical and machinery-related products, as well as medical or optical instruments.

=== Arms trade ===
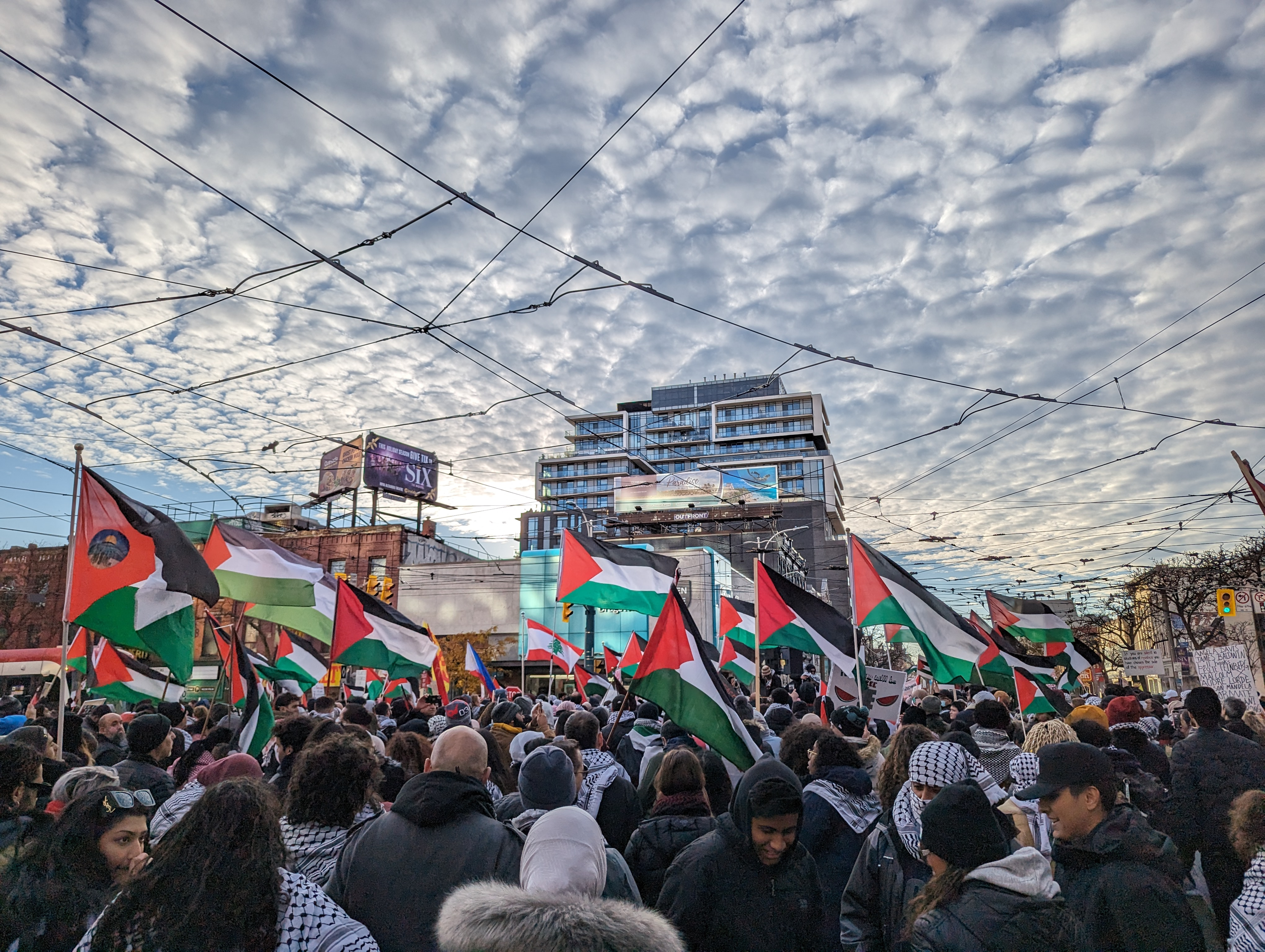
Toronto rally for Palestine on 18 November 2023

Israel was among Canada's top twelve non-US export destinations for military equipment in 2021 and 2022. Canada exported $26.1 million worth of military goods and technology to Israel in 2021, and $21.3 million worth in 2022.

On 19 March 2024, Melanie Joly announced that Canada would halt future arms deals to Israel, due to alleged Israeli failure to do enough to protect civilians in Gaza during the war. Canada "had already reduced its weapons shipments to Israel to non-lethal equipment such as radios" at some point "following the October 7 Hamas attack." Parliament "passed a non-binding resolution calling for the international community to work toward a two-state solution between Israel and the Palestinians" that week, but three of the Trudeau government's members voted against the motion. The vote was 204-117 with the support of Liberal Party of Canada, the New Democratic Party, the Bloc Québécois and the Green Party of Canada also called on Canada to work "towards the establishment of the state of Palestine". It came to light then that Joly had not approved an arms export permit since 8 January, and that Joly said "There are no open permits for exports of lethal goods to Israel". Israel Katz, Israel's Foreign Minister, responded by saying: "History will judge Canada’s current action harshly." Industry executives such as represented by the Canadian Association of Defence and Security Industries were baffled and dismayed, while trade unions such as the Canadian Union of Postal Workers (CUPW), the Canadian Union of Public Employees (CUPE) and the Public Service Alliance of Canada thought it right and proper. The Canadians for Justice and Peace in the Middle East thought the NDP measure didn't go far enough.

On 10 September 2024 Joly blocked the shipment of Quebec-manufactured ammunition from a subsidiary of General Dynamics to the US that was bound for Israel. Joly "was adamant Canada must end any arms shipments to the conflict in Gaza." Since 7 October 2023 she had also suspended 30 arms export permits towards Israel. It was said at the time that this measure "is also adversely affecting Canadian jobs and preventing Canadian Forces from accessing essential equipment like the pilot helmets produced in partnership between Israeli and Canadian suppliers." The National Council of Canadian Muslims urged this course on Joly. It was noticed in Israel that Joly had suspended from 7 October to date 30 arms export permits. In May 2025, the Investigative Journalism Foundation reported that Israel's largest arms manufacturer Elbit Systems had offered to sell Ontario drones to combat forest fires.

In July 2025, data uncovered from entries in the database of the Israel Tax Authority showed that Canadian goods continued to enter Israel, described by the Israeli government as military weapon parts and ammunition. Details of 2025 imports from Canadian companies included bullets and other military hardware of a kind that the Canadian government previously stated could not be shipped to Israel under the current arms ban.

== Public opinion polls ==
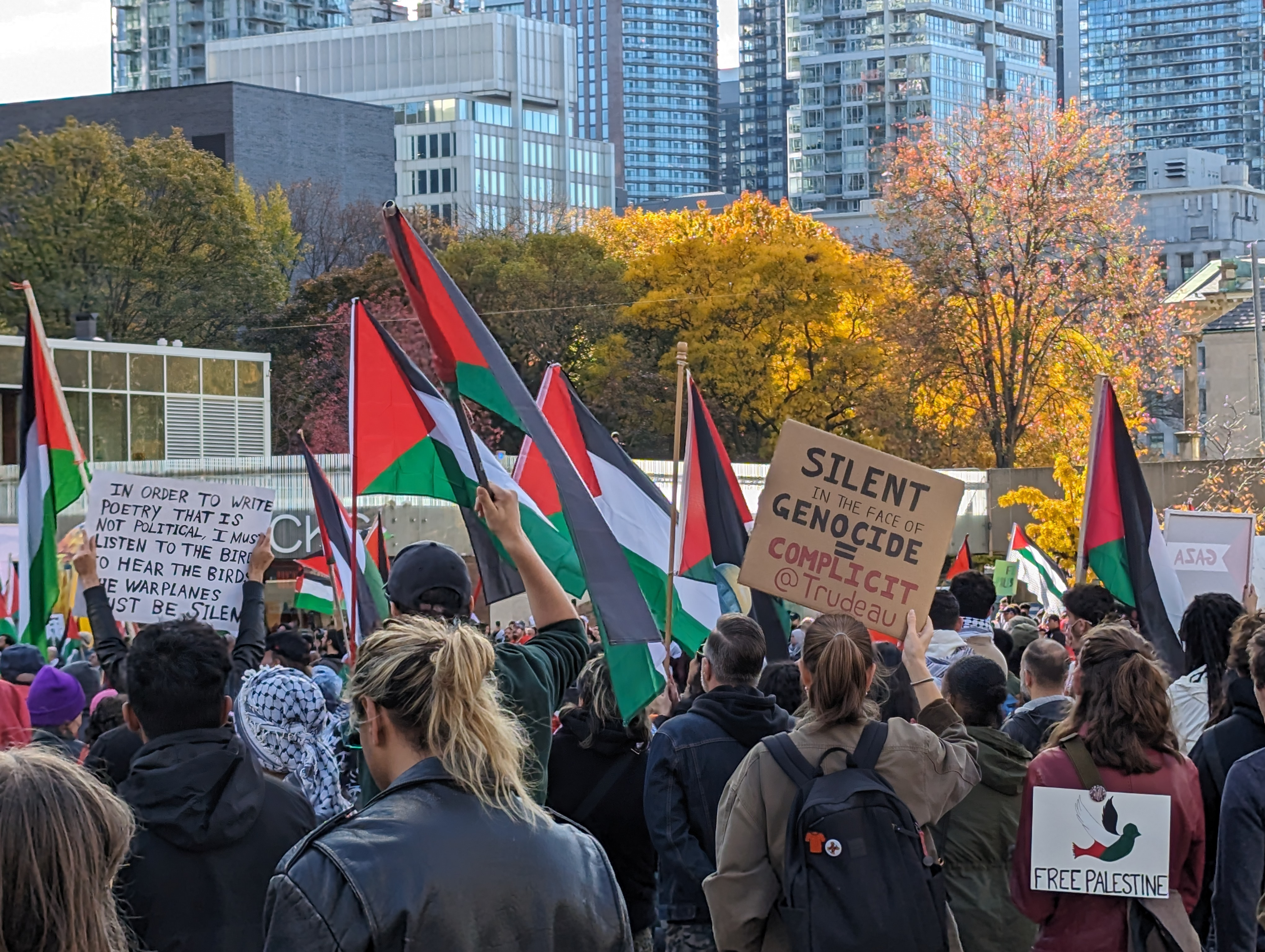
Pro-Palestinian protest in Toronto on 28 October 2023

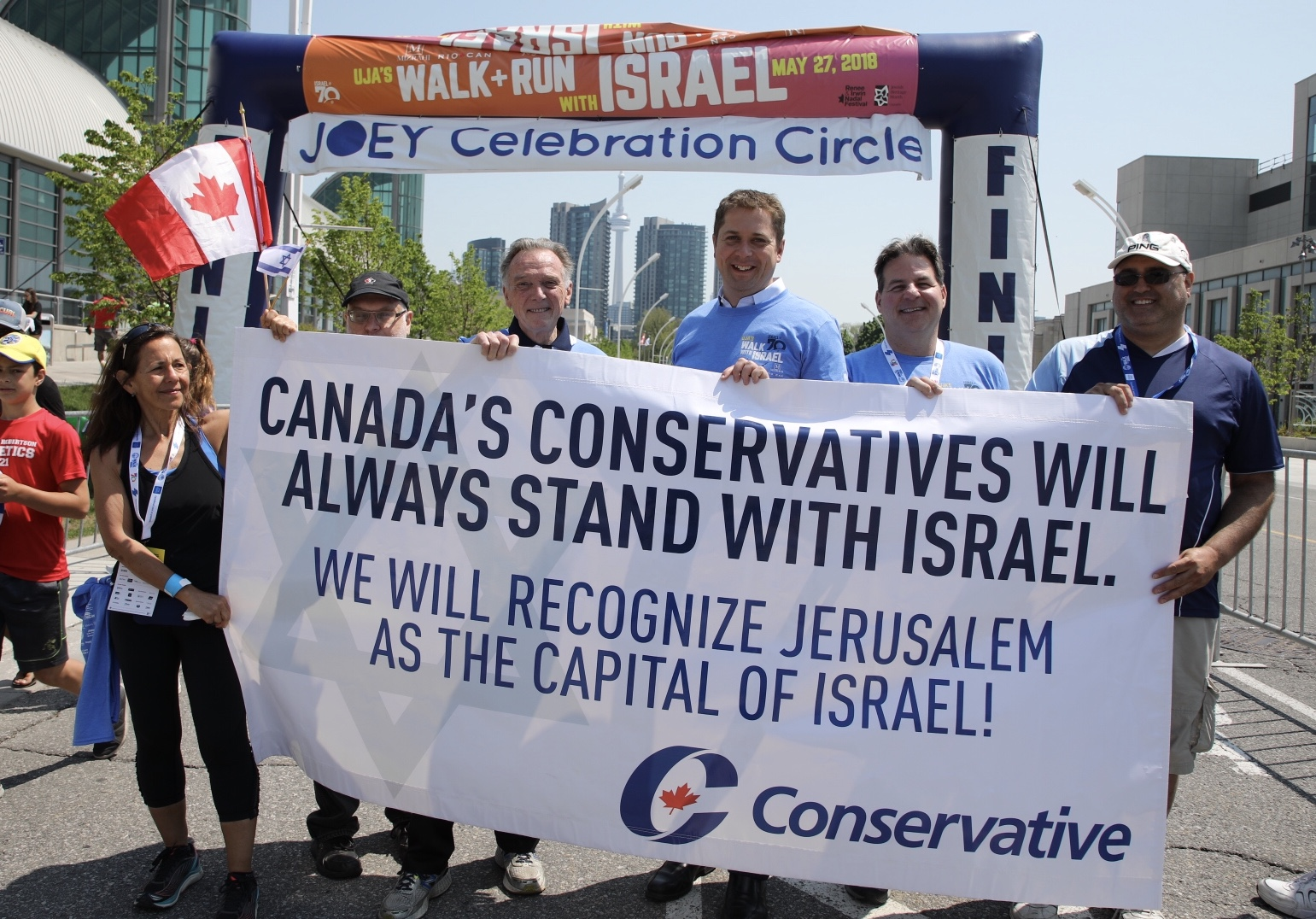
The Conservative Party of Canada announced in 2018 that if elected, they would recognise Jerusalem as the capital of Israel following the lead of President Trump's U.S. Embassy move

A 2005 Gallup Poll of Canadian views on the Arab-Israeli conflict found that 34% sympathised most with Israel, 30% sympathised most with Palestinian Arabs, and 36% said they did not have sympathy for either party or had no opinion.

According to a COMPAS poll during the 2006 Lebanon War, the majority of Canadians believed Israel has a right to self-defense and Iran and Syria should not be sheltering Hezbollah, which is classified as a terrorist organisation in Canada. 45% of Canadians opposed Harper's pro-Israeli stance. According to the COMPAS poll, 38 per cent of those polled believed Hezbollah started the war, and 35 per cent believe Israel started the war.

According to a 2013 BBC World Service Poll, 25% of Canadians view Israel as having a positive influence. An online poll, by Canada's Sun News in 2014, indicated that 72% would support Israel in a war with Iran.

In another poll conducted in 2012, 48% of Canadians supported their government favouring neither the Israelis nor the Palestinians.

A poll conducted by Canada's Forum Research after the 2014 Israel–Gaza conflict, found that 26% of Canadians support Israel, while 17% support Palestinians. Despite Canadians' support for Israel, they still remain critical of Israel's policies, as 49% believed the attack on Gaza during that summer was not justified (against 30% who think it was), 42% agreed that Israel's use of force was out of proportion, and 41% disagreed that Hamas is the only one responsible for the deaths of innocent Gazans. However, a large majority of 73% believed Hamas' rocket attacks on Israel are unjustified.

An EKOS poll conducted in September 2023 found that 48% of Canadians aged 18 to 34 saw Israel as "a state with segregation similar to apartheid", compared to 29% of Canadians aged 55 to 64. A Mainstreet Research poll conducted in early November 2023 found that 59% of Canadians approved of Canada's support for Israel in the Gaza war, while 18% disapproved. On the subject of Palestinian genocide accusations, an Angus Reid poll conducted in early February 2024 found that 41% of Canadians believed Israel is committing genocide, while 32% rejected the accusation.

An early summer 2025 poll revealed that approximately half of Canadians believe Israel is committing genocide in Gaza. Only one in five disagrees, with this disbelief being more prevalent among conservatives. Over 60% of supporters from the Liberal, NDP, Green Party, and Bloc Québécois agreed that Israel’s actions constitute genocide.

According to a 2025 Pew Research Center survey, 33% of people in Canada had a favorable view of Israel, while 60% had an unfavorable view; 26% had confidence in Israeli Prime Minister Benjamin Netanyahu, while 66% did not.

== Controversies ==
- In September 1997, Mossad agents were apprehended by Jordanian authorities after attempting to assassinate Khaled Mashal, a senior Hamas member. They were found to have used Canadian passports as part of the assassination attempt. Canada recalled its Ambassador to Israel in protest over the misuse of Canadian passports.
- In 2008, Israeli Ambassador to Canada, Alan Baker, said he feared Canadian Muslims might impact Canada's foreign policy. He said that the Canadian Muslims might push their values onto Canadians, which "wouldn't gel with Canadian values of mutual respect." He also criticised a Muslim Member of Parliament, Omar Alghabra and said that "Muslim activists" had prevented him from speaking. Bob Rae of the Liberal party called the comments inappropriate and inaccurate and Alghabra described them as "generalizing" and "divisive." The Canadian Arab Federation accused Baker of sowing division amongst Canadians. An editorial in the Toronto Star asserted that Israeli diplomats should not "interfere in Canadian affairs".
- In 2026, approximately 200 former senior Canadian diplomats signed an open letter calling on the Government of Canada to impose “robust” sanctions on Israel, citing restrictions on humanitarian aid and journalists’ access to Gaza, settler violence in the West Bank, and concerns over civilian casualties and alleged violations of international law in the occupied Palestinian territories and Lebanon.

== Resident diplomatic missions ==
Embassy of Israel in Ottawa
- Location: Ottawa
- Address: 50 O'Connor St., suite 1005
- Ambassador: Iddo Moed

Embassy of Canada to Israel in Tel Aviv
- Location: Tel Aviv
- Address: Canada House, 3/5 Nirim Street, 4th Floor, Tel Aviv 6706038, Israel
- Ambassador: Leslie Scanlon

The Embassy of Israel in Ottawa is Israel's embassy in Canada. It is located at 50 O'Connor Street, suite 1005, in Ottawa, the Canadian capital. Israel also operates Canadian regional consulates in Montreal and Toronto. In May 2011, it was vandalised with a spray painted message which read "Embassy of War Crimes".

It was reported in October 2022 that the RCMP had downgraded security for the Embassy of Israel in Ottawa and Israeli head of mission shortly after Nimrod Barkan, the former ambassador of Israel to Canada, retired in November 2019. Officials at the Embassy of Israel in Ottawa have stated that in the current climate there is a feeling of being at risk of violence after nearly three years of pushing Global Affairs Canada to increase its security.

=== Ambassadors ===
In 2013, Vivian Bercovici from Toronto was appointed as the Canadian Ambassador to Israel, and she served until June 2016. Currently, Leslie Scanlon is the Canadian Ambassador to Israel. She has served since February 2025, taking over from Lisa Stadelbauer.

== See also ==
- Jewish Canadians
  - Israeli Canadians
- List of ambassadors of Canada to Israel
- List of ambassadors of Israel to Canada
- International recognition of Israel
- Foreign relations of Canada
- Foreign relations of Israel
