= List of ambassadors of Canada to Israel =

List of ambassadors

Ambassador of Canada to Israel
- Incumbent; Leslie Scanlon since February 22, 2025
- Seat: Embassy of Canada, Tel Aviv
- Nominator: Prime Minister of Canada
- Appointer: Governor General of Canada
- Term length: At His Majesty's pleasure
- Inaugural holder: Terence MacDermot
- Formation: November 18, 1954

The ambassador of Canada to Israel is the official representative of the Canadian government to the government of Israel. The official title for the ambassador is Ambassador Extraordinary and Plenipotentiary of Canada to the State of Israel. The ambassador of Canada to Israel is Leslie Scanlon, who was appointed on the advice of Prime Minister Justin Trudeau on February 21st, 2025.

The Embassy of Canada is located at Canada House, 3/5 Nirim Street, 4th Floor, Tel Aviv 6706038, Israel.

== History of diplomatic relations ==
De facto recognition of Israel occurred on December 24, 1948, and de jure recognition came on May 11, 1949. Diplomatic relations between Canada and Israel was established on July 28, 1954. George Pirkis Kidd was appointed as Chargé d’affaires on October 18, 1954. Terence MacDermot was appointed as ambassador with residence in Greece on November 18, 1954. The first ambassador of Canada with residence in Israel came in 1958.

== List of ambassadors of Canada to Israel ==
No.	Name	Term of office			Career	Prime Minister nominated by	Ref.
No.	Name	Start Date	PoC.	End Date	Career	Prime Minister nominated by	Ref.
–	George Pirkis Kidd (Chargé d'Affaires)	October 18, 1954		April 17, 1957	Career	Louis St. Laurent (1948–1957)	
1	Terence MacDermot	November 18, 1954	November 23, 1954		Career	Louis St. Laurent (1948–1957)	
2	Edgar D'Arcy McGreer	March 14, 1957	September 18, 1957	October 28, 1958	Career	Louis St. Laurent (1948–1957)	
–	Blanche Margaret Meagher (Chargé d'Affaires)	April 17, 1957		October 28, 1958	Career	Louis St. Laurent (1948–1957)	
3	Blanche Margaret Meagher	October 22, 1958	October 28, 1958	December 1, 1961	Career	John G. Diefenbaker (1957–1963)	(Note: First resident ambassador of Canada)
–	Jean-Marie Gaétan Déry (Chargé d'Affaires)	December 1, 1961		August 1962	Career	John G. Diefenbaker (1957–1963)	
4	Arthur Julian Andrew	May 28, 1962	August 13, 1962	July 10, 1965	Career	John G. Diefenbaker (1957–1963)	
–	William McKenzie Wood (Chargé d'Affaires)	March 1965		October 4, 1965	Career	Lester B. Pearson (1963–1968)	
5	Robert Louis Rogers	April 7, 1965	October 4, 1965	October 2, 1969	Career	Lester B. Pearson (1963–1968)	
6	Charles Eustace McGaughey	June 9, 1969	October 13, 1969	June 30, 1972	Career	Pierre Elliott Trudeau (1968–1979 & 1980–1984)	
7	Thomas Paul Malone	May 23, 1972	August 15, 1972	September 2, 1975	Career	Pierre Elliott Trudeau (1968–1979 & 1980–1984)	
8	Edward Graham Lee	July 29, 1975	September 24, 1975	July 3, 1979	Career	Pierre Elliott Trudeau (1968–1979 & 1980–1984)	
9	Joseph Stephen Stanford	April 4, 1979	August 31, 1979	September 13, 1982	Career	Pierre Elliott Trudeau (1968–1979 & 1980–1984)	
10	Vernon George Turner	September 22, 1982	October 14, 1982		Career	Pierre Elliott Trudeau (1968–1979 & 1980–1984)	
11	James Bartleman	January 10, 1986	January 29, 1986	November 2, 1990	Career	Brian Mulroney (1984–1993)	
12	Michael Dougall Bell	November 15, 1990	December 11, 1990	January 21, 1992	Career	Brian Mulroney (1984–1993)	
13	Norman Spector	February 1, 1992		August 2, 1995	Career	Brian Mulroney (1984–1993)	
14	David Berger	July 4, 1995	September 12, 1995	August 29, 1999	Non-Career	Jean Chrétien (1993–2003)	
15	Michael Dougall Bell	August 11, 1999			Career	Jean Chrétien (1993–2003)	
16	Donald Sinclair	July 31, 2003	November 2003		Career	Jean Chrétien (1993–2003)	
17	Jon Allen	June 14, 2006	October 18, 2006	August 17, 2010	Career	Stephen Harper (2006–2015)	
18	Paul Hunt	August 10, 2010	October 5, 2010	June 20, 2013	Career	Stephen Harper (2006–2015)	
19	Vivian Bercovici	January 2, 2014	June 11, 2014	June 2016	Non-Career	Stephen Harper (2006–2015)	
20	Deborah Lyons	July 18, 2016	December 12, 2016	March 2020	Career	Justin Trudeau (2015–2025)	
21	Lisa Stadelbauer	March 25, 2021	June 21, 2021	February 21, 2025	Career	Justin Trudeau (2015–2025)	
22	Leslie Scanlon	February 22, 2025			Career	Justin Trudeau (2015–2025)	

== See also ==
- Canada–Israel relations
- List of diplomatic missions in Israel
- List of diplomatic missions of Canada
- Embassy of Canada to Israel
