= Deborah Lyons =

Canadian diplomat

Special Representative for Afghanistan
- In office 24 March 2020 – 16 June 2022
- Secretary-General: António Guterres
- Preceded by: Tadamichi Yamamoto
- Succeeded by: Roza Otunbayeva

Canadian Ambassador to Israel
- In office 19 July 2016 – 2020
- Monarch: Elizabeth II
- Prime Minister: Justin Trudeau
- Preceded by: Vivian Bercovici
- Succeeded by: Lisa Stadelbauer

Canadian Ambassador to Afghanistan
- In office 10 July 2013 – August 2016
- Monarch: Elizabeth II
- Prime Minister: Stephen Harper; Justin Trudeau
- Preceded by: Glenn V. Davidson
- Succeeded by: Kenneth Neufeld

Personal details
- Born: Miramichi, New Brunswick, Canada
- Education: BA University of New Brunswick, 1971

Deborah Lyons is a Canadian diplomat. She served as Special Representative of the Secretary-General of the United Nations for Afghanistan and Head of the United Nations Assistance Mission in Afghanistan (UNAMA) during 2020 to 2022. Prior to her United Nations posting, she was Canada's ambassador to Israel (2016–2020) and to the Islamic Republic of Afghanistan (2013–2016). In October 2023, she was appointed by Prime Minister Justin Trudeau to replace Irwin Cotler as Canada's Special Envoy on Holocaust Remembrance and Combating Antisemitism.

== Early life and education ==
Lyons grew up in the Chatham neighborhood of Miramichi, New Brunswick, Canada as one of nine siblings. She earned a Bachelor of Arts degree from the University of New Brunswick in 1971, graduating as the first female valedictorian in the university's history, and earned certification from the International Studies Program at the Canadian National Defence College in 1993.

Lyons owned and managed a hunting and fishing lodge on the Miramichi River and an energy and environment consulting firm prior to becoming involved in government.

Despite her roles as Canada's Special Envoy on Holocaust Remembrance and Combating Antisemitism and Canadian Ambassador to Israel, Lyons is not Jewish. Lyons has stated that “at first, as a non-Jew, I was concerned if I was the right person. Then, it became very clear to me it’s not Jews who created antisemitism, which is enacted by non-Jews. How ridiculous to think it’s only Jews who should lead the fight against antisemitism. It’s the non-Jews who have to stand up for this battle.”

== Career ==
Lyons was appointed Canada's ambassador to Afghanistan by Prime Minister Stephen Harper on 10 July 2013. She was the only female ambassador in Kabul during her first two years in role, until being joined by ambassador of the United Kingdom to Afghanistan, Dame Karen Pierce, in 2015. During Lyons' tenure, the Canadian Embassy in Kabul moved to the forefront of women's issues in Afghanistan. In regard to her role as the highest ranking female diplomat in Kabul and the impact of her position, Lyons said in 2015, "One thing I know it has done is it has helped the Afghan women’s groups — it has helped validate them, and it has helped them believe that they have got a strong champion for their issues and for their work."

On 19 July 2016, she was appointed ambassador to Israel by Stéphane Dion, Foreign Affairs Minister of the Trudeau Cabinet. She replaced Vivian Bercovici, a controversial appointee. Lyons' appointment was welcomed by the Canadian diplomatic corps and Ferry de Kerckhove, a former Canadian envoy to Indonesia and Egypt, noted that the selection of an experienced and intelligent diplomat "underscores the importance that Canada attaches to Israel."

She helped unveil a monument for guards at her embassy who were killed during the Kabul attack on Canadian Embassy guards.

In October of 2023, she was appointed by Prime Minister Justin Trudeau as Special Envoy on Holocaust Remembrance and Combatting Antisemitism. As part of that role she serves as Canada's representative to the International Holocaust Remembrance Alliance (IHRA). In a statement in response to the appointment, Lyons wrote, "I am proud to accept this role and responsibility and I am committed to working with all levels of government, institutions and stakeholders to promote Holocaust awareness and combat antisemitism here in Canada and abroad." In July 2025, she announced that she was leaving the appointment three months before the end of her term, citing exhaustion. The office was abolished by the Carney government in February 2026 in favour of a new Advisory Council on Rights, Equality and Inclusion.

== Awards and achievements ==
- Honorary Doctor of Letters, University of New Brunswick, 2015
- Order of New Brunswick, 2016
