= Edward Graham Lee =

Canadian lawyer and diplomat (1931–2020)

Personal details
- Born: November 21, 1931 Vancouver, British Columbia, Canada
- Died: April 8, 2020 (aged 88) Ottawa, Ontario, Canada
- Education: University of British Columbia
- Occupation: Diplomat, lawyer

Edward Graham Lee (November 21, 1931 – April 8, 2020), also known as Ted Lee, was a Canadian lawyer and diplomat.

== Early life ==
Edward Graham Lee was born in Vancouver, British Columbia on November 21, 1931. He attended the University of British Columbia Faculty of Law (Class of 1955). His interest in international law was sparked by UBC's founding dean George F. Curtis. His 39-year career in Foreign Affairs were a result of the Dean's encouragement. He spent a year practising domestic law with Nathaniel Nemetz and Jack Austin in Vancouver, British Columbia. He found the scope of work in domestic law boring, and returned to Ottawa to continue work in international law.

== Diplomatic career ==
While involved with the United Nations Human Rights Commission, Lee helped draft the convention against racial discrimination. Although there human rights had previously existed, this was significant because it was hard law that the state would have to comply with. He was an ambassador to South Africa when apartheid was at its worst, but also when changes were being brought about. During this time, Canada provided support, both in statesmanship and funding to help the Black community set up infrastructure. He was able to help Winnie Mandela build a kindergarten and with the fostering of good relations with Archbishop Desmond Tutu and Helen Suzman.

== Diplomatic posts ==
His career as a diplomat involved the "Legal Division, Department of External Affairs, Ottawa, 1956. Second Secretary to Jakarta, Indonesia, 1959. Deputy Chief of Protocol, 1961. Head of the United Nations Economic and Social Affairs Section, 1961. Counsellor to London, 1965. Director of Legal Operations, 1969-71, and of Personnel Operations, 1971-73. Legal Advisor and Director General of the Bureau of Legal Affairs, 1973-75. Ambassador to Israel and High Commissioner to Cyprus, 1975. Assistant Under-Secretary for United States Affairs, 1979-82. Ambassador to South Africa and High Commissioner to Lesotho and Swaziland, and Canadian Representative to Namibia, 1982-86. Legal Advisor and Assistant Deputy Minister for Legal, Consular and Immigration Affairs, 1986-90. Ambassador to Austria, Governor of Canada to the International Atomic Energy Agency, Permanent Representative to the United Nations in Vienna and to the United Nations Industrial Development Organization, 1990-93".

== Retirement and death ==
After officially retiring from his diplomatic career, he became an adjunct professor of international law at the University of Ottawa, and the president of the Canadian Council on International Law.

Lee died on April 8, 2020, at the age of 88.
