= Tadamichi Yamamoto =

Japanese diplomat

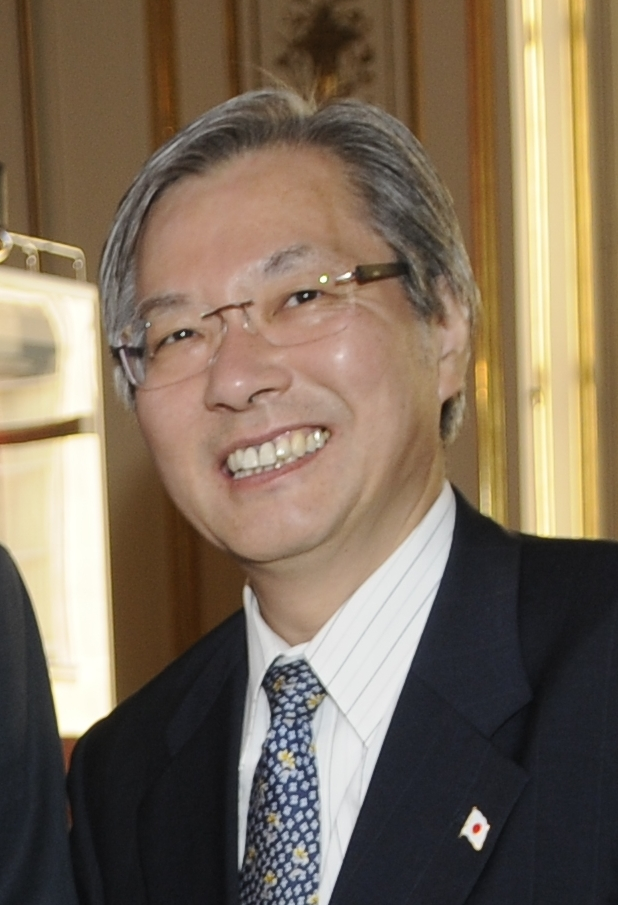
- Yamamoto in 2011

Special Representative of the Secretary-General for Afghanistan
- In office March 2016 – March 2020
- Secretary-General: Ban Ki-moon; António Guterres
- Preceded by: Nicholas Haysom
- Succeeded by: Deborah Lyons

Ambassador of Japan to Hungary
- In office 2010–2012

Personal details
- Born: 1950 (age 75–76) Hatsukaichi, Hiroshima, Japan
- Education: Tokyo Institute of Technology; University of Oxford

Tadamichi Yamamoto (山本 忠通, Yamamoto Tadamichi; born 1950) is a diplomat, who served as UN Secretary-General's Special Representative for Afghanistan and head of the UN Assistance Mission in Afghanistan (UNAMA) until replaced by Deborah Lyons in March 2020.

Previously, he served as the Secretary-General's Deputy Special Representative for Afghanistan dating back to November 2014. He also served as Ambassador of Japan to Hungary in 2012 and was the special representative of the Government of Japan for Pakistan and Afghanistan from 2010 to 2012. Yamamoto also coordinated a ministerial-level international conference on Afghan development, which was held in Tokyo, Japan in July 2012.

He completed his Bachelor of Science degree in engineering from the Tokyo Institute of Technology and a bachelor's degree from the University of Oxford.
