= Lisa Stadelbauer =

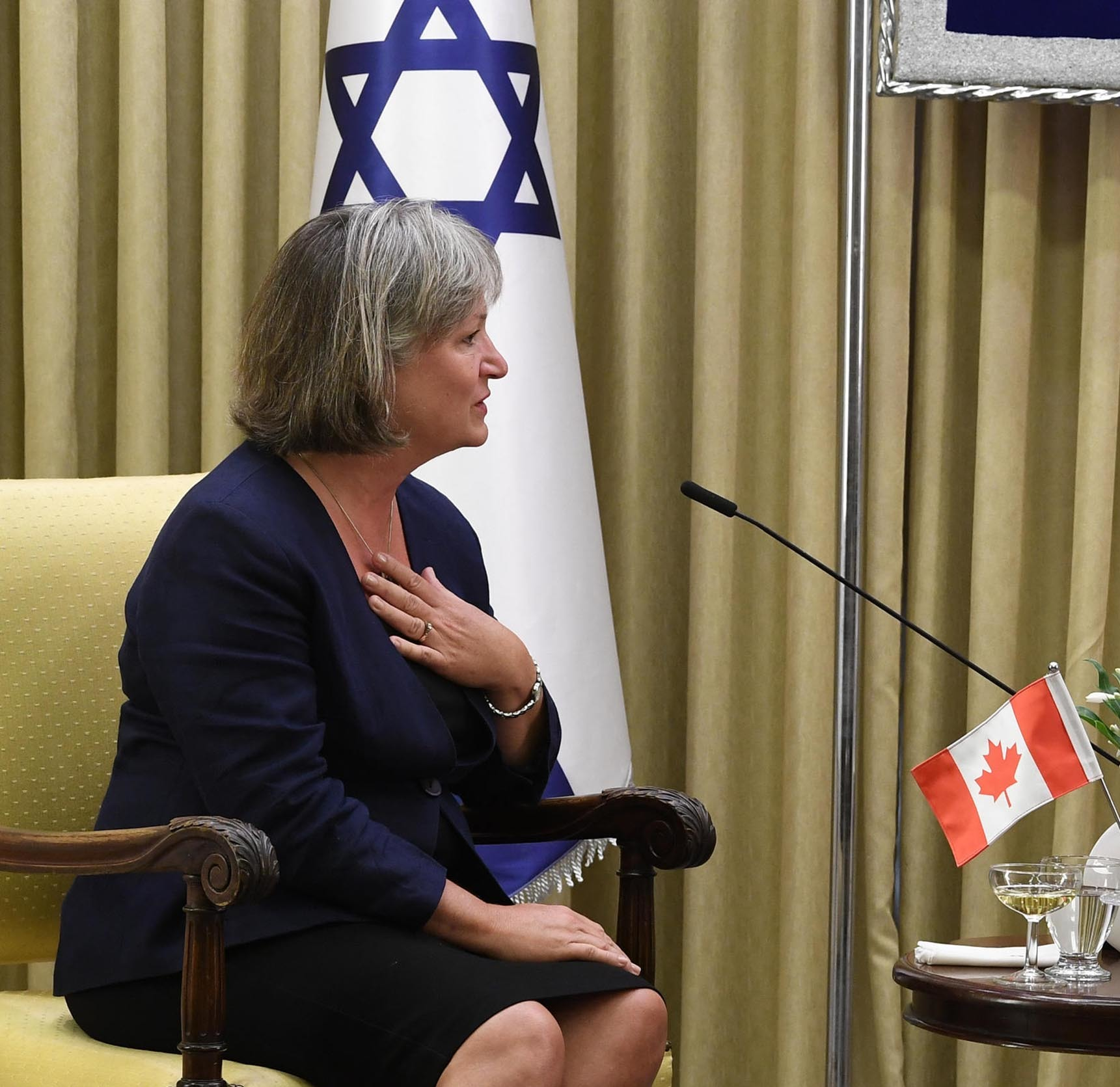

Canadian ambassador to Israel
- In office June 17, 2021 – February 26, 2025
- Appointed by: Administrator of the Government of Canada; On the advice of the Minister of Foreign Affairs
- Monarchs: Elizabeth II; Charles III
- Prime Minister: Justin Trudeau
- Preceded by: Deborah Lyons
- Succeeded by: Leslie Scanlon

Personal details
- Education: University of Western Ontario

Lisa Stadelbauer is a Canadian diplomat who most recently served as Canadian ambassador to Israel until 2025. Her past duties in Canada's Foreign Service include the posts of the High Commissioner to Kenya and Ambassador and Permanent Representative to the United Nations Environment Programme (UNEP) and to the United Nations Habitat Programme. As High Commissioner to Kenya, she was ex officio the non-resident High Commissioner to Rwanda and Uganda and Ambassador to Somalia and Burundi.

A 1988 graduate of the University of Western Ontario with a BA in Administrative and Commercial Studies, Stadelbauer joined External Affairs and International Trade Canada in 1990. From 2011 to 2015, she served as ambassador to Zimbabwe and Angola and high commissioner in Botswana. Stadelbauer was appointed Canada's High Commissioner to Kenya in October 2018 and presented her credentials to President Uhuru Kenyatta on Wednesday, December 5, 2018.
