= Arabist (political) =

Political term

As used in modern, mainly American (or historically British Imperial), political discourse, the term Arabist generally refers to a non-Arab observer with experience or specialization in Arabic language and culture, who is perceived to be excessively sympathetic towards Arab League political views, especially in relation to the Arab–Israeli conflict. Accusations of bias, and the term's use as a pejorative arose in the United States where "Arabists" in public service, largely in the State Department, were perceived as being "pro-Arab" by pro-Zionist and Jewish organizations and commentators following World War II and in the run-up to the partition of Palestine.

Rafael Medoff, in describing how the Jewish American community emerged from obscurity to play a role in behind-the-scenes power politics before coming to center stage, writes of the period: "Much of the Jewish political struggle in the United States during the late 1940s was a battle between American Zionists and State Department Arabists, for the hearts and minds of the White House, Congress, and the American public. Through the press, the Zionists waged a critical battle to create a conventional wisdom." A similar time frame for the emergence of such a politically charged connotation was provided by Joseph Kraft in 1971, when he wrote that the term Arabist originally referred to anyone who was trained in the Arabic language and made the study of the Middle East his or her life's work. Over the last four decades, however, it has been used in a more specific and derogatory manner to refer to those government Middle East specialists, most with Arabic-language training, who have spent extensive time in the Middle East and are seen to identify with the Arab cause or generally be "pro-Arab."

State Department Arabists have long been a favorite target of Washington neoconservatives, precisely because the latter's support for the hawkish Likud line in Israeli politics makes them hostile to any effort in Washington to balance U.S. foreign policy between support for Israel and recognition of Arab interests.

More recently, in describing the development of American foreign policy in the Middle East, Matthew Jacobs avoids using the term Arabist altogether, "as it suggests language skills that few professional observers of the Middle East possessed prior to the mid-1950s and because it has become a contentious and even derogatory term, with significant political implications since the early 1970s."
