= Vivian Bercovici =

Canadian politician

Canadian Ambassador to Israel
- In office January 2, 2014 – June 2016
- Monarch: Elizabeth II
- Prime Minister: Stephen Harper; Justin Trudeau
- Preceded by: Paul Hunt
- Succeeded by: Deborah Lyons

Personal details
- Born: 1961 (age 64–65)
- Citizenship: Canada, Israel
- Party: Conservative
- Children: 2
- Education: University of Toronto (LLB); York University (BA); Hebrew University of Jerusalem

Vivian Bercovici is a Canadian-Israeli lawyer and diplomat. She practiced law in Toronto and was briefly an adjunct professor at the University of Toronto Faculty of Law, was a member of the CBC's board of directors, and worked for the Israeli intelligence firm Black Cube.

In 2014, she was appointed as the Ambassador of Canada to Israel, and was replaced by career diplomat Deborah Lyons on July 19, 2016. In 2021 the CBC reported that Bercovici was employed by Israeli intelligence firm Black Cube after the end of her ambassadorship.

== Early life and education ==
A dual citizen of Canada and Israel, Bercovici was born to Jewish parents in 1961.

Bercovici studied at the Hebrew University of Jerusalem from 1981 to 1982 before going to York University, where she received a BA in English and political science in 1984. She received a diploma in international relations from the London School of Economics in 1985, and her LLB from University of Toronto in 1988.

== Career ==
Bercovici practised law in Toronto for 24 years focusing on media defence and financial regulatory work, as well as representing Canada in negotiations with various First Nations. In the 1990s, she worked for two years as a senior policy adviser in Ontario’s financial ministry. She also wrote a column about Israel-related issues in The Toronto Star and briefly taught a law course at the University of Toronto.

Bercovici was a member of the Board of Directors of CBC News/Radio-Canada from 2013 to 2018, and a board member of the Canadian Journalism Foundation. She is a regular contributor to the Jerusalem Post, National Post and The Hub.

Stephen Harper appointed Bercovici Canadian Ambassador to Israel in 2014. The Globe and Mail reported that her appointment was viewed negatively in the Canadian foreign service due to her strong pro-Israel stances, lack of diplomatic experience, and ideological ties to Likud. Foreign Affairs Minister John Baird and other media sources argued that her pro-Israel stances were in line with the Harper government's foreign policy and that her long career as a Toronto lawyer demonstrated that she was qualified for the position.

She was dismissed by Justin Trudeau and Foreign Affairs Minister Stéphane Dion in 2016. She was dismissed with a slew of other diplomatic appointees deemed "controversial". She sued the Canadian government for $10 million following her dismissal; the suit was settled out of court.

Bercovici remained in Israel after her dismissal and as of 2021 resided in Tel Aviv. She is the institutor and head editor of State of Tel Aviv, a weekly bulletin and podcast in Israel. She is a senior fellow at the Jewish People Policy Institute in Jerusalem, an Executive Fellow with the University of Calgary School of Public Policy. She is the Managing Director of Nuuvera Israel, a cannabis company. She continued to write about Israel issues, including pieces critical of Netanyahu.

=== Connection to Black Cube ===
A 2021 investigation by CBC News/Radio-Canada learned that Bercovici worked for the Israeli intelligence firm Black Cube after the end of her diplomatic assignment. The CBC was given messages in which Bercovici told prospective clients that Black Cube services include "undercover surveillance, finding hidden information about third parties' personal lives and tracing bank accounts and assets", and that "she would be one of the people personally supervising all operational matters".

Bercovici, Senator Linda Frum, the Anti-Defamation League, the Jewish Federations of Canada and B’nai B’rith Canada, accused the CBC of the antisemitic dual loyalty trope in its reports about her time as ambassador.

== See also ==
- List of ambassadors of Canada to Israel
