= Terence MacDermot =

Canadian diplomat and academic

Terence William Leighton MacDermot
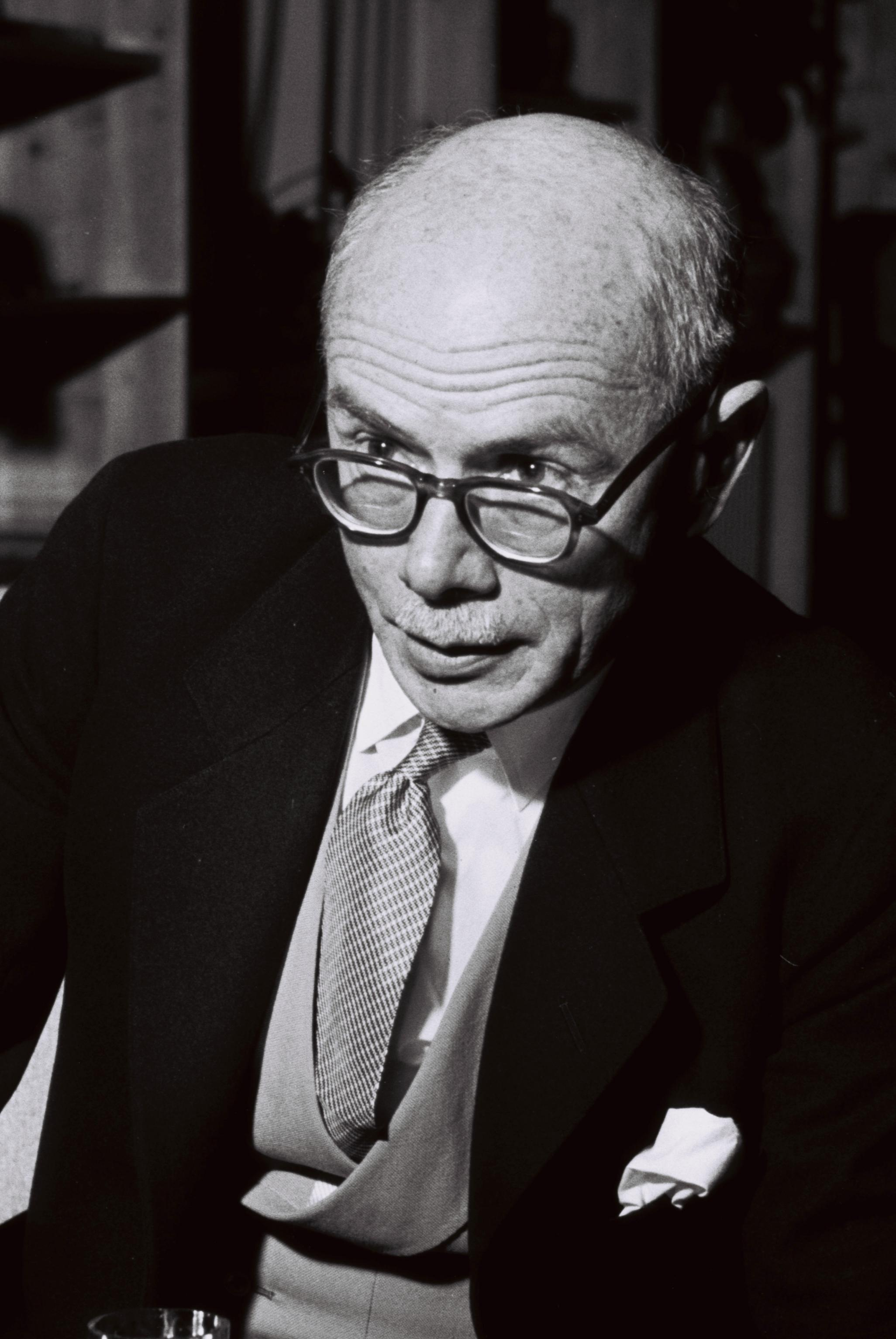
- Born: September 13, 1896; Ropley, Gordon Town, Colony of Jamaica (now Gordon Town, Saint Andrew Parish, Jamaica)
- Died: April 29, 1966 (aged 69); Sherbrooke, Quebec
- Burial place: Mount Royal Cemetery
- Education: McGill University, New College, Oxford
- Known for: Diplomat and academic
- Spouse: Elizabeth Savage
- Children: Galt MacDermot

Terence William Leighton MacDermot (September 13, 1896 – April 29, 1966) was a Canadian diplomat and academic.

== Early years ==
Born in Saint Andrew Parish, Colony of Jamaica to Henry Myles Fleetwood MacDermot and Mary Emily MacDermot (Langdon), MacDermot immigrated with family to Canada and grew up in Montreal, Quebec.

== McGill and Service During World War I ==
He attended McGill University from 1913 to 1916 and received a Bachelor of Arts degree in 1917 while serving in the 7th Canadian (McGill) Siege Battery during World War I. As member of the 7th Canadian Siege Battery he was involved in the Battle of Vimy Ridge under the 44th Heavy Artillery Group of the 1st Canadian Division of the Canadian Expeditionary Force.

== Post War, Rhodes Scholar and academic career ==
A Rhodes scholar, he received his Bachelor of Arts and Master of Arts degree in 1922 from New College, Oxford. From 1922 to 1923, he taught at Hotchkiss School in Connecticut. He returned to Montreal in 1923 where he taught at Lower Canada College and in McGill's history department. In 1929, he was appointed assistant professor. From 1925 to 1930, he was editor of the McGill News.

In 1934, he was appointed national secretary of the League of Nations Society in Canada. In 1935, he was appointed principal of Upper Canada College.

== Service in World War II ==
During World War II, he served for the War Service Department, a major in the Canadian Intelligence Corps and then as a chief army examiner for the Military District 2 in Toronto. MacDermot retired from active duty in 1945 as lieutenant colonel.

== Diplomatic career ==
In 1944, he joined the Department of External Affairs and later served in various overseas posts:

- Canadian High Commissioner to South Africa from 1950 to 1954
- Canadian Ambassador to Greece and Israel from 1954 to 1957
- Canadian High Commissioner to Australia from 1957 to 1961

== Return to academia ==
He taught political science at Bishop's University from 1961 to 1966.

He was given an honorary LL.D. degree from McGill in 1957.

== Death ==
MacDermot died in Sherbrooke, Quebec on April 29, 1966, aged 69, and was interred at Mount Royal Cemetery.
