= George Kidd (diplomat) =

George Pirkis Kidd (June 6, 1917 – July 22, 2004) was a Scottish-Canadian diplomat. He was the first Canadian ambassador to Israel in 1954 and was the ambassador to Cuba at the time of the Cuban Missile Crisis in 1962.

He was born in Glasgow, Scotland and later moved to Canada with his parents. He was wounded in action at the Battle of Normandy during World War II.

Kidd was posted as Ambassador Extraordinary and Plenipotentiary to the Canadian embassy in Havana a few months after the American embassy closed in early 1961. A few days after the John F. Kennedy assassination, he expressed the opinion in a confidential memo (released in 1999) that, although he considered it unlikely, Cuban involvement in the killing could not be ruled out. He served in the same role for Haiti starting in 1962.

He was deputy director of the Canadian International Development Agency from 1967 to 1971. He served as High Commissioner to Nigeria and Sierra Leone from 1974 to 1977. After he retired in 1977, he served on the board of trustees of the Art Gallery of Greater Victoria and the board of governors of the University of Victoria.

He died at the age of 87 from complications after hip surgery.
