= Embassy of Canada to Israel =

Embassy of Canada to Israel, in Tel Aviv
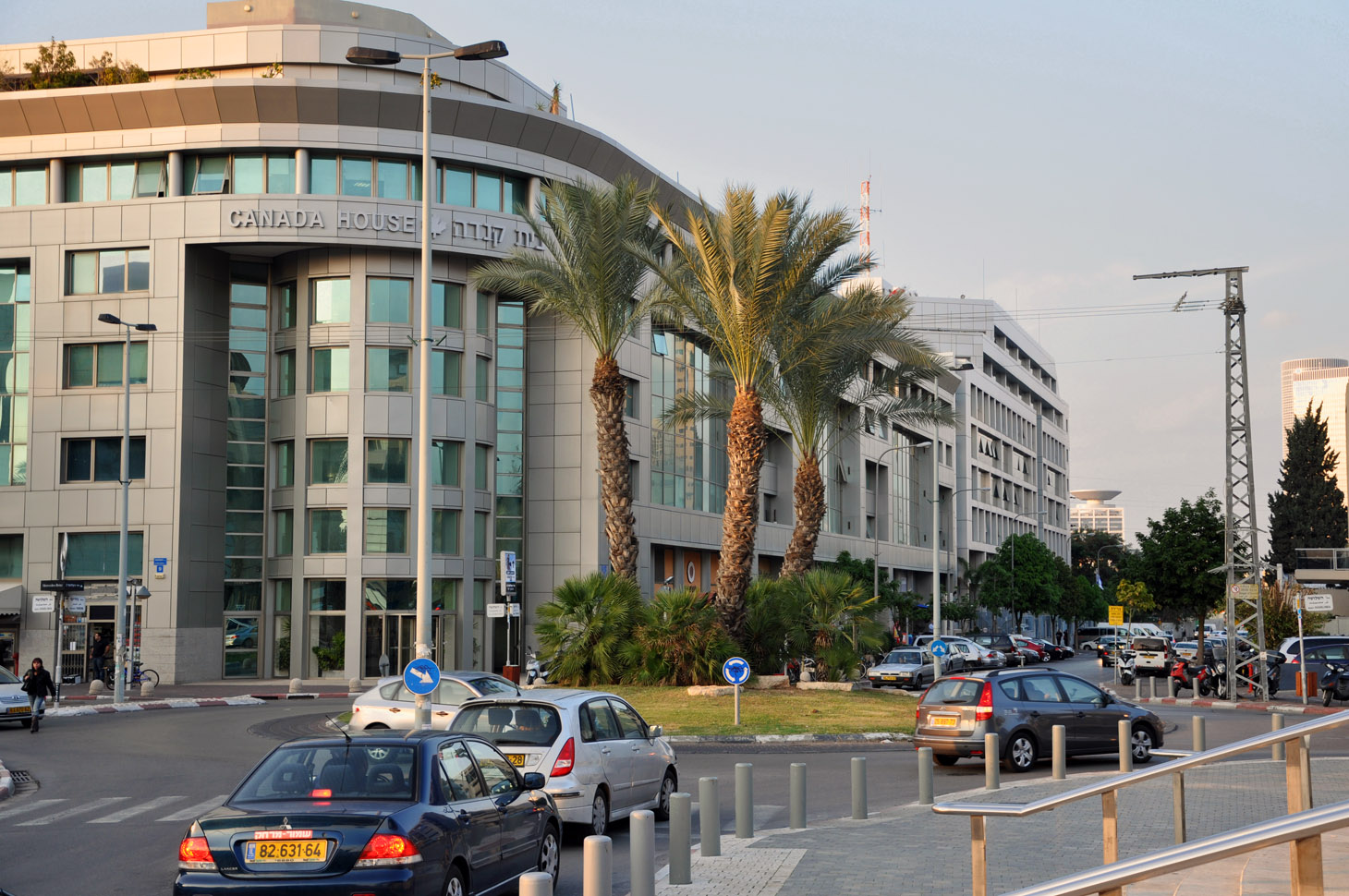
- Location: Canada House
- Address: 3/5 Nirim Street, 4th Floor, Tel Aviv, Israel
- Coordinates: 32°03′46″N 34°47′26″E
- Opening: September 1953
- Ambassador: Leslie Scanlon
- Jurisdiction: Israel
- Website: Global Affairs Canada

The Embassy of Canada to Israel in Tel Aviv (colloquially referred to as Canada House) is the diplomatic mission of the Canadian government to Israel. It was opened in 1953, five years following Israel's sovereignty proclamation of 1948.

In the 1970s, Joe Clark's government promised to move the embassy to Jerusalem, but did not follow through due to fears of economic backlash from Arab states.
