= Economic impact of the Gaza war =

The Gaza war has significant economic implications. The number of Palestinians living in poverty has surged dramatically, with an additional 300,000 people falling into poverty by November 2023. The war caused a severe economic downturn, with employment in the Gaza Strip plummeting by 61% and the West Bank by 24% between October and November 2023. By March 2024, unemployment in the Palestinian Territories had soared to 57%, resulting in 500,000 job losses.

Gaza's infrastructure and economy were struggling before the conflict, with 61% of the population living below the poverty line. The war exacerbated these conditions, causing extensive damage to homes, hospitals, schools, water and sanitation systems, and food security. The United Nations Development Programme (UNDP) reported that the conflict had set back human development in Gaza and the West Bank by 11–16 years. By the end of December 2023, the Palestinian economy had lost $1.5 billion, with Gaza's economy shrinking by 80% in the fourth quarter. In May 2024, it was reported that $50 billion in investments had been wiped out, plunging 1.8 million people into poverty.

Following the October 7 attacks, the Israeli government restricted 100,000 Palestinian laborers from entering Israel for work, severely impacting their incomes. The increased Israeli military presence and settler violence further hindered mobility and economic activity. The situation was further exacerbated by Israel's withholding of tax revenues, affecting the pay of about 143,000 workers between October and December 2023. The economic impact was particularly severe in Hebron's Old City, where 80% of businesses closed due to curfews and restrictions imposed by the Israel Defense Forces (IDF). The conflict and economic measures have had devastating effects on the livelihoods and stability of Palestinians in both Gaza and the West Bank.

== Palestine ==
According to the director of the UN Development Programme (UNDP) Regional Bureau for Arab States, Abdallah Al Dardari the number of Palestinians living in poverty has risen by 300,000 in November 2023. Between October and November 2023, it was reported that the war had caused a 61% drop in employment in Gaza and a 24% drop in the West Bank. The Palestinian GDP was expected to have fallen about 4.2% between the same time, compared with prior estimates with a loss of about $857 million. It was expected the figure to increase to about $1.7 billion if the war continued through December 2023. In March 2024, the International Labour Organization stated unemployment had risen to 57 percent in the first quarter of 2024, with 507,000 job losses in the Palestinian Territories. Gaza experienced a severe financial crisis as a result of Israel's attacks, with access to cash severely limited. Around 85% of the workforce in Gaza is currently without a job, resulting in a significant slowdown in economic activities. As a result, the region is functioning at a mere 16% of its full capacity, resulting in a severe economic downturn as described by the World Bank.

=== Gaza's infrastructure and economy ===
Poverty in Gaza was already characterized as severe before the war due to the ongoing Israel blockade, with 61% of the population considered below the poverty line according to the World Bank. After only one month of fighting the percentage has increased by about 20% with the number expected to increase by about 34% in the second month of the war. After one year, the UN Trade and Development body stated that the economy of Gaza was in "utter ruin" and that it would take 350 years to return to pre-conflict levels.

The war has caused devastating damage to Gaza's infrastructure and economy. The war has resulted in upheaval and destruction on a scale never before seen in the enclave. The United Nations Office for the Coordination of Humanitarian Affairs (OCHA) reported that over 41,000 homes were destroyed and over 222,000 were damaged. The war also badly affected hospitals, schools, water and sanitation systems, and food security. The UNDP has reported a predicted 11 to 16-year setback in the human development index across Gaza and the West Bank, with the amounts expected to grow during the war.

By the end of December 2023, the Palestinian Central Bureau of Statistics estimated that the Palestinian economy had lost a total of US$1.5 billion since the start of the conflict. In February 2024, the World Bank reported that Gaza's economy had shrunk by 80 percent in the fourth quarter of 2023. In May 2024, the United Nations Development Program stated $50 billion in investments had been wiped out and 1.8 million people had fallen into poverty. In August 2024, Gaza underwent a cash crisis as all banks ceased operations.

=== Employment in Gaza ===
The war caused significant job losses in Gaza. As the war reached its one-month mark, 61 percent of employment in Gaza, equivalent to 182,000 jobs, was estimated to have been lost. By June 2024, the International Labour Organization stated unemployment was at 80 percent.

=== West Bank ===
Shortly after the 7 October attacks, Israel had restricted about 100,000 Palestinians laborers living in the West Bank from crossing into Israel for work, per reported security concerns. These cross-border laborers accounted for about $5.5 billion, or about one third of the combined economy of the West Bank and Gaza according to the World Bank. Other Palestinians have also become hesitant to move around due to an increase in Israeli military movement and Israeli settler violence within the West Bank. According to then U.S. Treasury Secretary Janet Yellen, speaking in February 2024, "Blocking West Bank residents from working in Israel, it has a very significant negative effect on incomes in the West Bank." The International Labour Organization has estimated that as of December 2023 about 32% of employment or 276,000 jobs were lost in the West Bank since the start of the war with a loss of $500 million in October and November 2023.

In February 2024, B'Tselem reported that Israel had restricted Palestinians in the West Bank from harvesting their olive trees, stating, "The 2023 harvest was especially important this year as the Palestinian economy is already struggling due to the war in Gaza – particularly because of the prohibition on labourers entering Israel".

The West Bank was also severely impacted by the Israeli decision to withhold the tax revenues. Prior to the outbreak of the war, Israel and the Palestinian Authority had been in dispute over tax money that Israel collects for the West Bank and Gaza, causing the pay of about 143,000 workers to be affected between October and December 2023. The director of the Hebron Reconstruction Committee stated that 80 percent of businesses in Hebron's Old City were closed due to the IDF's curfews and closures.

In May 2024, the Palestinian Authority stated the Israeli finance ministry was withholding tax revenues, and as a result, public sector salaries could only be partially paid. U.S. Treasury Secretary Janet Yellen stated she was concerned about the reports. In July 2024, the government of Brazil announced it was adopting a free trade policy with the Palestinian Authority.

== Israel ==
The economic toll of the war may cost Israel an estimated $400 billion in lost economic activity over the next decade – threatens Israel's economic future. For Israel, 90% of the economic shock will come from indirect effects: reduced investment, slowing productivity growth and labor market disruption. According to the Bank of Israel, Israel’s war-related costs from 2023 to 2025 could end up amounting to $55.6 billion, thereby costing Israel 10% of its economy.

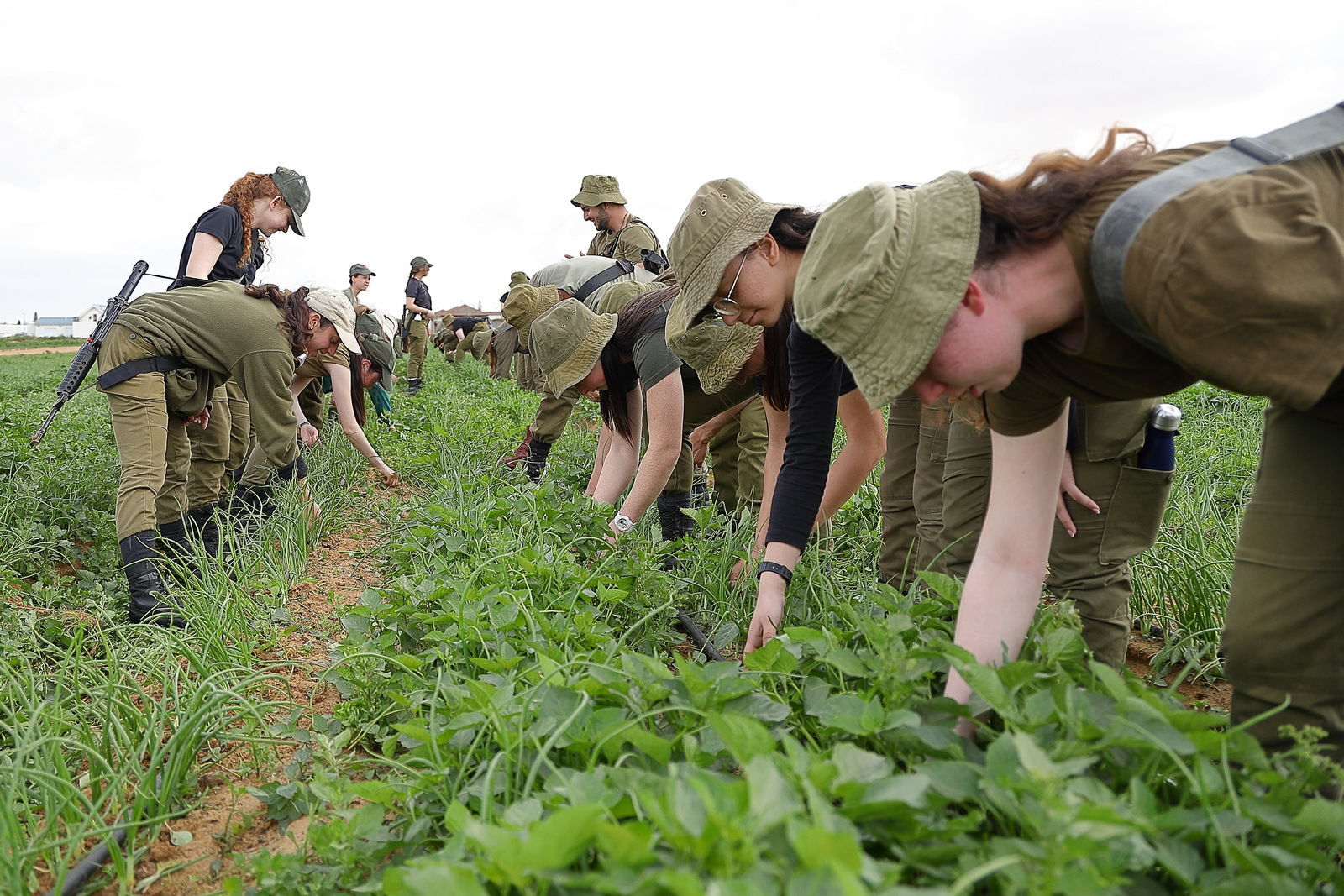
Female members of the Israel Defense Forces working in fields, replacing lost foreign labour - March 2024

Due to Israel suspending Palestinian work permits, it recruited workers from India and Sri Lanka to fill the gaps. In the final quarter of 2023, the Israeli economy shrank by 20% caused due to labour shortages in construction and from the mobilization of 300,000 reservists. While Israel did still see economic growth of 2%, this was down from 6.5% growth in the year before the war. Further consequences of the war were that consumer spending declined 27%, imports declined by 42% and exports were reported to decline by 18%.

Israel's economy experienced a more significant decline than anticipated by market analysts, signifying the largest contraction in nearly four years, as reported by Israel's Central Bureau of Statistics' initial assessment. This downturn can be attributed in part to a decrease in business operations caused by the mobilization of workers for military service and the restriction of entry for Palestinian employees into Israel. Private consumption was the primary factor behind the economic contraction, experiencing a significant decline of 26.9%. Additionally, business investment plummeted by 67.8%, while exports and imports decreased by 18.3% and 42% respectively. However, government spending partially offset these losses by increasing by 88.1%, primarily due to war expenses. According to the statistics office, Israel's economy in 2023 witnessed a modest growth of 2%, but it was lower compared to the previous year's figure of 6.5%.

Israel has committed to covering both direct and indirect damages resulting from the 7 October attack near Ashkelon, where numerous missiles launched by Hamas hit. This includes compensating businesses for lost turnover and ensuring salary payments for affected employees. To support this effort, the government has established a loan fund of ILS10bn (USD2.7bn) and is providing grants to businesses experiencing a sharp decline in sales. Predicting the overall financial impact of the conflict is difficult, given the uncertainty surrounding its duration. However, it is evident that Israel and the broader region will face tough economic times ahead. Its central bank has revised its growth forecast for 2024 from 3% to 2% and anticipates that GDP recovery to pre-war levels will take over a year. Despite these challenges, spending needs persist. The government recently increased the national budget by approximately USD19bn and projected a 6.6% deficit for the current year, largely due to war-related expenses. In response to these economic pressures, major credit-rating agencies such as Fitch Ratings, Moody’s, and S&P Global are evaluating Israel's A+ rating for a potential downgrade. In August 2024, Fitch Ratings downgraded Israel's credit rating.

9,855 Thai workers in the agricultural sector, 4,331 workers in the construction sector and 2,997 in the nursing sector left Israel following al-Aqsa Flood. In addition, the prevention of 85,000 Palestinian workers from entering Israel created a shortage of about 100,000 foreign and Palestinian workers.

Israel will experience a significant economic shock, with 90 percent of its impact stemming from indirect consequences such as decreased investment, a disrupted labor market, and hindered productivity growth.

By 10 July 2024, 46,000 businesses in Israel were forced to close down due to the economic impact of the war, affecting almost every sector of the economy. Furthermore, on 12 July the port of Eilat declared bankruptcy resulting in it seeing no economic activity or revenue for eight months.

=== European investigations ===
On 7 March 2024, the EU's top diplomat Josep Borrell announced that the European Union would be investigating Israel's compliance with the human rights clauses stipulated in its trade deal, the EU-Israel Association Agreement. In October 2024, Spanish Prime Minister Pedro Sanchez called on the EU to suspend its free trade agreement with Israel due to apparent violations of human rights clauses in the EU-Israel Association Agreement.

=== Military expenses ===
The war is costing the Israeli economy $600M a week due to work absences, according to the Bank of Israel. This is equivalent to about 6% of the weekly GDP. The bank also stated that the estimate does not reflect total damage and did not include damages caused by the absence of Palestinian and foreign workers. On the other hand, Israel's treasury minister said the daily direct cost of the Gaza war to her country is about 246 million. Between October 7, 2023 and January 2025, military expenses cost Israel 170 billion shekels (US$46 billion). Due to war spending the Israeli government's budget deficit reached 7% of gross domestic product and the debt-to-GDP ratio increased to 69% by 2024.

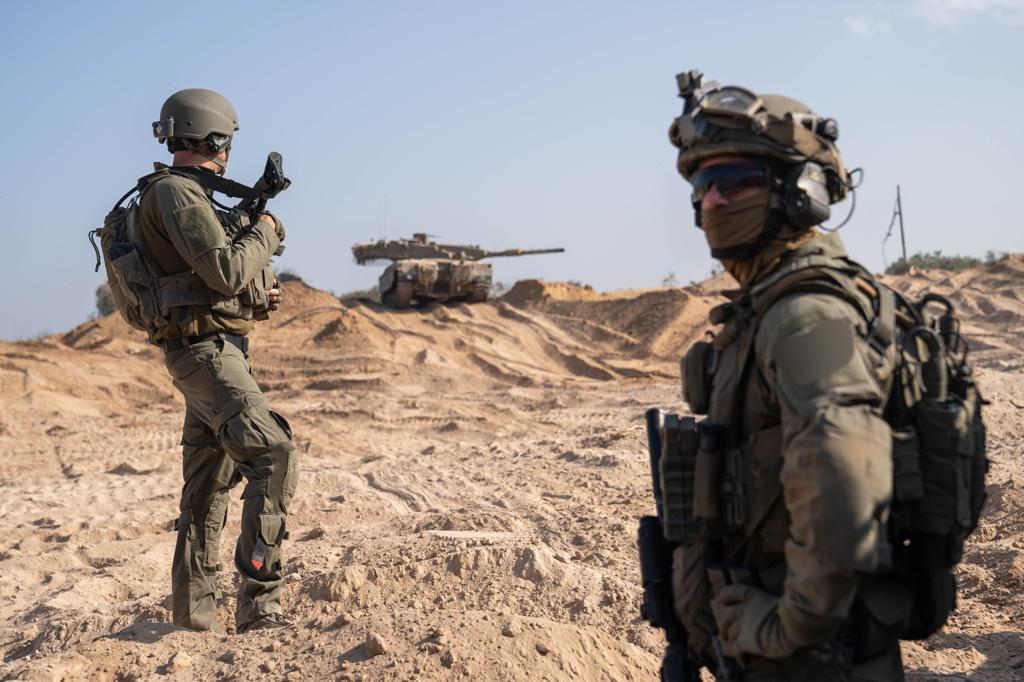
Israel Defense Forces troops stationed in the Gaza Strip during the early months of the Gaza war - November 2023

In November, the Bank of Israel projected that the war would incur a total expense of approximately USD53 billion until 2025. This estimation was based on forecasts of increased defense and other expenditures, coupled with a decline in tax revenue. The magnitude of military activity witnessed by Israel in terms of duration, intensity, and cost has not been observed in recent times. The 2014 Gaza War, also known as Operation Protective Edge by the Israel Defense Forces (IDF), lasted for over a month and had a significant impact on the Israeli economy. It resulted in an estimated loss of ILS7bn (USD1.96bn), excluding reservist pay and air force weaponry expenses. To restore financial stability, the government implemented a budget cut of ILS2bn (USD559m) across all ministries, except defense.

Funding of the military during the war in Israel ballooned, going from $1.8 Billion to $4.7 billion by the end of 2023.

Funding for Operation Gideon's Chariot was estimated at costing the Israeli taxpayer 1.2 billion shekels a month.

=== Sanctions & divestment ===
==== Sanctions and embargoes ====
On 30 January United States President Joe Biden signed an executive order which allowed the US to impose sanctions on Israeli settlers, with potential inclusion of Israeli politicians and government officials that were found to be involved with violent attack against Palestinians. Biden had earlier ordered the secretaries of state and treasury to prepare for the potential sanctions against Israeli individuals or entities that were involved in the violence against Palestinians in the West Bank. Israeli Finance Minister Bezalel Smotrich responded to Biden's order, saying it was based on "an antisemitic lie". Smotrich later stated, "We will not stand aside in the face of this injustice" and called for settlements to be "entrenched." Israel's National Security Minister Itamar Ben-Gvir praised the sanctioned settlers, calling them "heroic". Netanyahu criticized the sanctions and called them unnecessary. Following the U.S. sanctions, online fundraisers collected hundreds of thousands for the settlers. In March 2024, the U.S. sanctioned three additional settlers and two settler outposts.

On 4 February 2024, Canadian foreign minister Melanie Joly stated that her government was preparing to issue sanctions against extremist settlers. On 16 May, Canada sanctioned four West Bank settlers. On 27 June 2024, Canada sanctioned another seven settlers. The UK also issued sanctions on the four settlers and a second round of sanctions in May 2024. On 13 February, France stated that it was imposing sanctions on 28 settlers who have used violence against Palestinians in the West Bank. Spanish Foreign Minister José Manuel Albares said that Spain would implement settler sanctions if the European Union does not come to an agreement. Spain later announced sanctions on 12 violent Israeli settlers. On 18 March, the EU unanimously agreed to sanction violent Israeli settlers.

In July 2024, the U.S. announced sanctions against three Israeli individuals, four settler outposts, and a violent extremist organization in the West Bank. Soon after, the EU announced sanctions on five Israeli individuals and three for "serious and systematic human rights abuses".

Turkey began to impose export restrictions on Israel on 9 April 2024 on 54 different goods, including iron, marble, steel, cement, aluminium, brick, fertilizer, construction equipment and products, and aviation fuel. On 2 May 2024, Turkish officials stated that Turkey would halt all exports and imports to and from Israel. In May 2024, France banned Israeli defence firms from exhibiting at the Eurosatory 2024 arms show, preventing 74 Israeli firms from appearing. The same month, European Union foreign ministers met to discuss placing sanctions on Israel for violating international humanitarian law. In June 2024, Colombia which is Israel's largest supplier of coal, barred all coal exports to Israel's war in Gaza. The same month, the United States sanctioned Tzav 9 for attacking humanitarian aid distribution.

In October 2024, the U.K. announced sanctions against West Bank settlements and organizations responsible for violence against Palestinians. The same month, the Australian Council for International Development called on Australia to implement sanctions on Israel for violating the Geneva Conventions, due to the state's obligation to "prevent the crimes of starvation and forcible transfer". Irish prime minister Simon Harris announced in mid-October 2024 that Ireland was exploring restricting trade with Israel.

Foreign Direct Investment in Israel fell by 29% in 2023. Furthermore, Israel's bond yields by the end of 2024 had reached the highest in 13 years which reflects investors’ decreasing confidence in Israel’s economic stability, and Israel’s aim to compensate for military spending.

Israel’s high-tech sector constitutes the largest share of its GDP. The war however led to dramatic losses for it due to a drop in foreign and domestic investments. According to Israeli Research Centre IVC, there was a 42% decline in the number of transactions between Israeli companies and foreign investors in 2024 compared to 2023. Samsung also closed down operations in Israel and in June, Intel cancelled the construction of a $25 billion factory. Furthermore, a survey by Start-Up Nation Central, an NGO that investigates Israel’s 7,500 high-tech companies and 500 multinational companies, found that 49% of Israel's 7,500 high-tech companies and 500 multinational companies had cancelled investments, while 70% express concern about their ability to gain profits in the coming year, and 40% were planning to relocate operations outside of Israel. 24% have already relocated at least part of their operations abroad, and 44% have reported making workforce cuts.

==== Israeli claims of Chinese sanctions ====
Israel's high-tech factories reported on 25 December that they had been having trouble with electronic imports from China due to recent bureaucratic obstacles, leading to higher import costs and delayed delivery times. Israeli officials also reported that China had refused to send workers to their country during the war against the backdrop of a worker shortage in Israel's construction and farming sectors. China's actions were described as a de facto sanction.

==== Divestment ====
On April 28, Portland State University (PSU) announced it was pausing its financial ties with Boeing, including gifts and grants, over its ties to Israel. PSU President Ann Cudd wrote in a campus-wide letter, "the passion with which these demands are being repeatedly expressed by some in our community motivates". On May 6, Trinity College Dublin in Ireland agreed to end its investments in Israeli companies that are listed on the United Nations Human Rights Council "blacklist" after an encampment on Fellows' Square was erected. This included three of the 13 Israeli companies the university's endowment fund had invested in.

The University of Helsinki in Finland suspended student exchanges with Israeli universities on May 21 after two weeks of campus protests. On May 28, the University of Copenhagen in Denmark announced it would cease investing in companies that operate in the occupied West Bank, divesting US$145,810 worth of holdings from Airbnb, Booking.com, and EDreams the next day. Three days later, Ghent University in Belgium cut ties with Israeli universities and research institutions, referencing "concerns regarding connections between Israeli academic institutions and the Israeli government, military, or security services". The university had severed ties with three Israeli institutions two weeks earlier, citing incompatibility with Israel's human rights policy. On June 11, the University of Waterloo in Ontario, Canada, agreed to protesters' demands to factor human rights into its investment decisions.

In late August 2024, San Francisco State University began the divestment process from four weapons manufacturers involved with the war. The next month, the MIT Coalition for Palestine announced that MIT would discontinue its MIT-Lockheed Martin Seed Fund, a program that financed collaboration between MIT and Israeli universities. The Coalition said this was "the first known American-Israeli weapons manufacturer partnership to end at an American university since the war on Gaza began". Three months later, the Institut d'études politiques de Strasbourg said it would break ties with Reichman University in Israel due to its "warmongering" stance on Gaza.

Samsung Next, the venture capital arm of Samsung Electronics, announced in April 2024 that it was closing operations in Israel after a decade of investment amid declining business conditions in the country. The BDS movement called it "yet another strong indicator of the dramatically declining confidence in the Israeli economy". In June 2024, the Norwegian pension fund divested $69 million from Caterpillar Inc. due to its alleged ties to Israel's human rights violations in Gaza and the West Bank. In August 2024, the Universities Superannuation Scheme, the UK's largest pension fund, reduced its exposure to Israeli assets by £80mn.

=== Tourism ===
Tourism after the 7 October attacks slumped in Israel, with most international airlines suspending flights to Israel. The country saw about 58,000 tourists in January 2024 compared to the 257,400 that had come in January 2023, marking an about 80% decrease in numbers. The Israeli Central Bureau of Statistics reported that there had been a 96% decrease between the months in single day visits, with only 500 counted in 2024 compared to 14,000. Israelis are also limiting their travel abroad, with about a 50% decrease between the years.

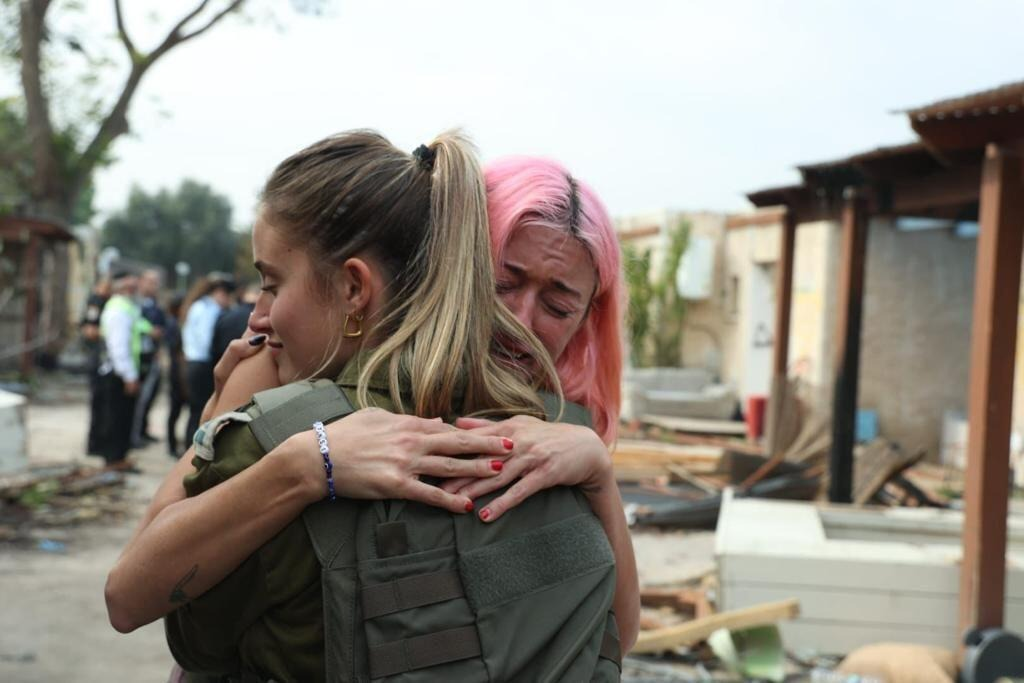
Caroline D'Amore overcome with emotion while visiting Kfar Aza kibbutz in November 2023

Many evacuees from attacked kibbutz's were settled in tourism based areas, causing many towns like Eilat to adjust to supporting evacuees and little to no tourists for their businesses. Business owners have reported having to lay off employees as evacuees mostly do not have the money to spend, and tourists find the space depressing due to the evacuees. The Israeli government announced in January 2024 that there would be an aid package for Eilat that included about 50 million shekels to help with business.

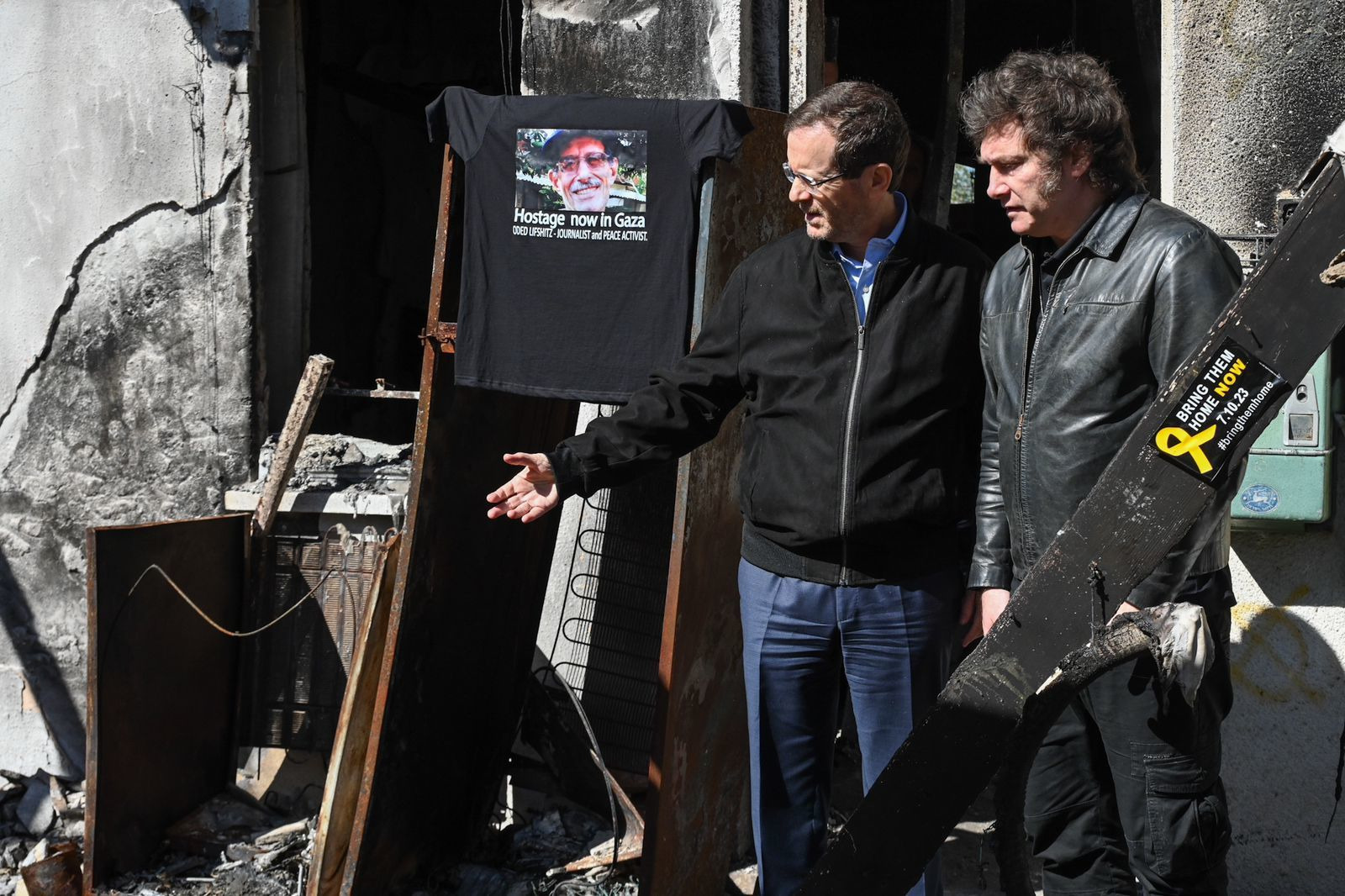
Argentine president Javier Milei being toured through the Nir Oz kibbutz in February 2024

In February 2024 it was reported that a thriving sector of touring the sites of the 7 October attacks had been created shortly after the attacks. While some called the tours insensitive and uncomfortable, others feel it is akin to touring Holocaust sites such as Auschwitz to bear witness. People from across the globe have partaken in tours that cost reportedly between $85 and $100 per person. Some of the tours are led by residents of the kibbutz's who feel that there is a need to return to prove they are stronger than the attack, and to tell the stories of the 7 October attacks, although some areas are closed military zones. Many visitors are part of solidarity mission participants from Jewish communities in the United States, celebrities and social media influencers. Some notable visitors have included politicians, the former Miss Iraq Sarah Idan, Elon Musk, Debra Messing and Douglas Murray, who have used their platforms to document their experiences and spread information about their trips, emotions and beliefs.

== Global economy ==
The conflict has the potential to plunge the global economy into recession. War could have significant repercussions on Europe’s economic landscape, impacting it through reduced regional commerce, stricter financial regulations, escalated energy costs, and diminished consumer assurance. Goldman Sachs underscored that the most crucial and potentially impactful method that strain could permeate the European economy was via the petroleum and natural gas markets. On October 30, 2023, the World Bank issued a concerning report warning that the conflict could trigger a substantial "shock" to the global economy, with potential consequences including an increase in the price of oil to as high as $150 per barrel; this would have severe implications on the worldwide economy, including an increase in food prices, potentially plunging millions into food insecurity. The report drew parallels to the 1973 war, during which Arab members of OPEC, imposed an oil embargo on the allies of Israel, including the United States.

=== Houthi attacks ===
At the onset of the war, the Yemen based Houthis initiated guided missile attacks initially targeting merchant ships with Israeli connections and later expanding to include assets from the U.S. and Europe. These attacks greatly disrupted global supply chains and caused transit through the Red Sea, including the Suez Canal to plummet. It is anticipated that these attacks will intensify if Israel proceeds with its invasion of Rafah in Gaza, with potential threats to undersea cables. According to experts, the destruction of these cables in the Red Sea could severely disrupt data and financial communications between Europe and Asia. The Houthi attacks on Red Sea bound

=== Impact on Egypt ===
The war in Gaza, unfolding along its border with the Sinai Peninsula, has brought the economy of Egypt to the verge of crisis. Prior to the outbreak of the conflict, Egypt was already a nation grappling with a vulnerable economy with the war threatening the viability of the country's tourism sector and impeding the importation of natural gas. The country's economy, which is currently being sustained by external aid, is grappling with mounting public debt exceeding 90 percent of its GDP, capital outflows, and a depreciating currency against the US dollar.

Since November, Egypt has been facing the economic repercussions of Houthi missile and drone attacks on commercial vessels in the Red Sea, carried out in response to Israel's conflict with Gaza. As a result, many shipping companies have chosen to redirect their vessels around the Cape of Good Hope, bypassing the shortest trade route connecting Asia to Europe through the Suez Canal. This has had a significant impact on Egypt's revenue from the Suez Canal, which amounted to $9.4bn in the 2022-23 fiscal year. However, in the first 11 days of this year, the revenue from the Suez Canal has experienced a drastic decline of 40 percent compared to the same period in the previous year.

=== India ===
Indian experts are expressing their apprehension about the ongoing conflict, as they fear it may have adverse effects on the Indian economy. The escalating oil prices are expected to raise import costs, consequently leading to an increase in prices for commodities and food items. This situation poses a significant challenge for the Indian economy.

=== Lebanon ===
The olive trade in southern Lebanon, which is the main source of income for many, was halted as farmers stopped their harvests in fear of the active shelling. According to the Minister of Agriculture, 40,000 olive trees were burned down by fires caused by IDF shelling. The Institute of International Finance predicted that Lebanon's GDP could decline by one percent by the end of the year and by 30 percent in 2024 in the event of further spillover of the war.

=== United States ===
The United States House of Representatives has endorsed the Republican proposal, which designates $14.5 billion in military support for Israel. Furthermore, Israel has been the recipient of the largest sum of military aid from the US in comparison to any other country since the conclusion of World War II, with assistance surpassing $124 billion.

=== Brand boycotts ===
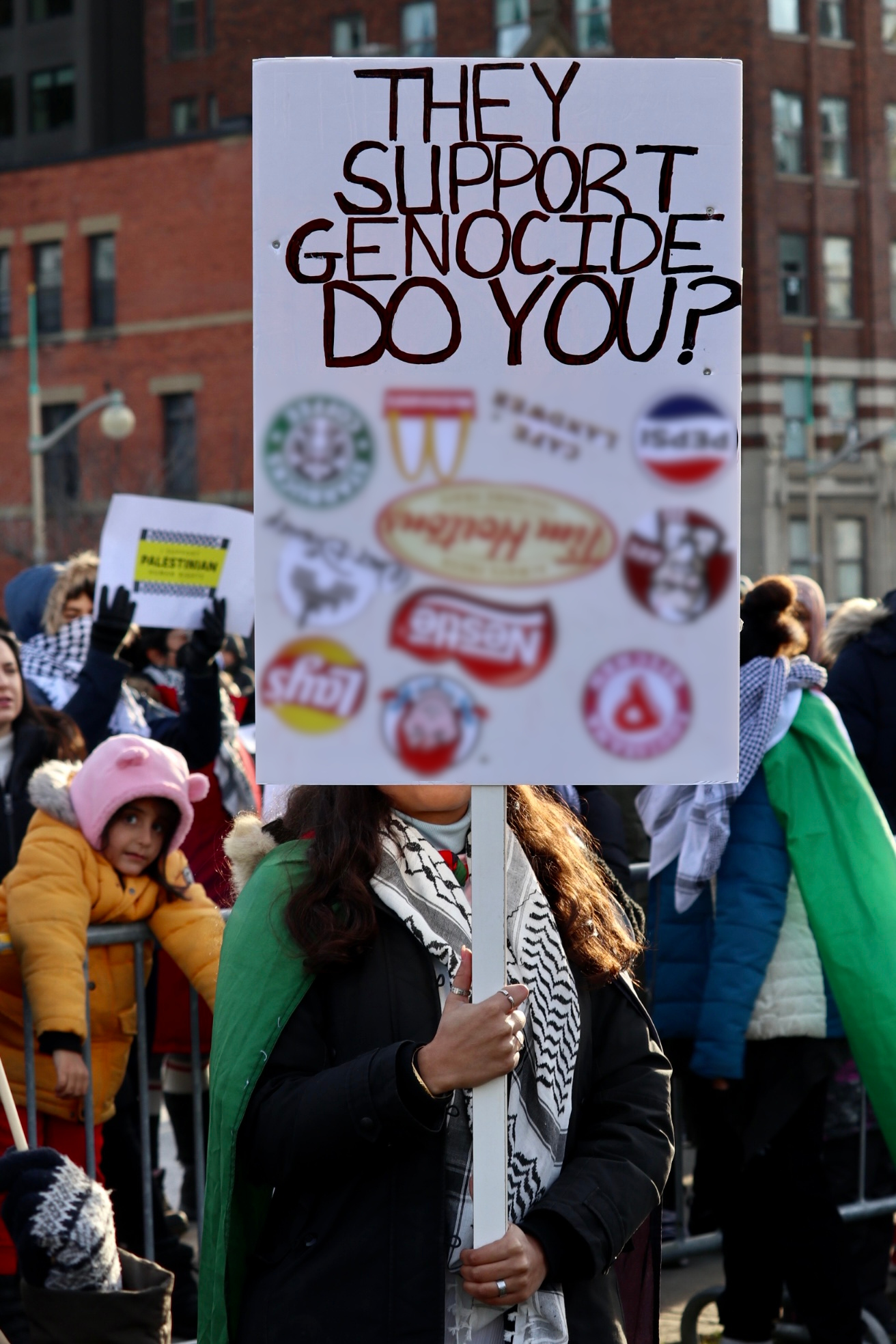
Pro-Palestinian protest in Ottawa, Canada, 23 Nov 2023

The brand boycott was a notable aspect of the war's economic implications. Brands such as McDonald's, Coca-Cola and Starbucks faced consumer boycotts over their support of Israel; reflecting anger at Western governments' support for Israel.

Campaigners in Derry, Northern Ireland persuaded O'Neills to remove Puma products due to the sports brand's sponsoring of the Israeli Football Association. Starbucks was targeted in Keighley, West Yorkshire, with protesters smashing the shop's windows, following the corporation's decision to sue the Starbuck Workers United union after the labour organisation posted on social media support for Palestine.

Direct action was taken at arms factories in the United States and the United Kingdom that supplied arms to Israel, such as Lockheed Martin, General Dynamics, Textron, Boeing, L3Harris, Raytheon Technologies and Northrop Grumman. For instance, on 10 November 2023, trade unionists in Rochester, Kent, blocked the entrances to a BAE Systems factory, stating the facility manufactured military aircraft components used to bomb Gaza; and on 16 November, Palestine Action occupied a Leonardo factory in Southampton, stopping production. ZIM was barred from entering ports in Malaysia.

On April 4, 2024, McDonald's Corporation announced that it would buy Alyonal from its CEO, Omri Padan, which would make the Israeli McDonald's franchise corporate-owned, pending regulatory approval. The announcement was after a boycott was called in Muslim-majority countries after Padan had offered free meals to IDF troops after the start of the Gaza war.

In March 2024, Michael Fakhri, the UN special rapporteur on the right to food, and Balakrishnan Rajagopal, the UN special rapporteur on the right to adequate housing, called on BP, Chevron, and Exxon to cease providing oil to Israel, with Rajagopal stating, "Corporations should cease and desist or face potential liability tomorrow."

== International Monetary Fund ==
The growth forecast for the entire Middle East-North Africa (MENA) region has recently been revised downwards by the International Monetary Fund. According to the IMF, the region is expected to experience a 0.5 percent decline in growth, which is a cause for concern. The IMF attributes this contraction to various factors, including a decrease in oil production and a significant decline in tourism, particularly in countries like Egypt and Jordan, where tourism plays a crucial role in their economies.

Furthermore, the disruptive impact of Iran-backed Houthi attacks on shipping is exacerbating the situation. Describing the aggression in the Red Sea as a significant maritime chokehold, Hamaizia highlights that approximately 30 percent of global shipping has been affected. This has resulted in a 43 percent decrease in traffic through the Suez Canal and a 60 percent increase in traffic around the Cape of Good Hope, a longer and considerably more expensive route.

== See also ==
- Impacts of the Gaza war
- International reactions to the Gaza war
