= List of resolutions at the sixty-sixth session of the United Nations General Assembly =

This is a list of United Nations General Assembly resolutions at the sixty-sixth session of the United Nations General Assembly.

== Resolutions ==
Resolution	Plenary or Committee	Item number	Date	Topic	Approve/Reject/Abstain	Notes	Resolution document
A/RES/66/1 A	Plenary	3 (b)	16 September 2011	APPROVED Credentials of representatives to the sixty-sixth session of the General Assembly	114/17/15	Debate over the inclusion of the National Transitional Council as Libya's representativeto the UN, passed with support from Chad, Egypt, Equatorial Guinea, Gabon, Iran and Senegal, after doubts were raised by Angola, Bolivia, Cuba, Kenya, Nicaragua, Venezuela and Zambia.	
A/RES/66/1 B	Plenary	3 (b)	26 October 2011	APPROVED Credentials of representatives to the sixty-sixth session of the General Assembly	without vote	Introduced by Panama as head of the Credentials Committee.	
A/RES/66/2	Plenary	117	19 September 2011	APPROVED Political declaration of the High-level Meeting of the General Assembly on the Prevention and Control of Non-communicable Diseases	without vote		
A/RES/66/3	Plenary	67 (b)	22 September 2011	APPROVED United against racism, racial discrimination, xenophobia and related intolerance	without vote	In commemoration of the Durban Conference.	
A/RES/66/4	Committee 5 (Administrative and Budgetary)	138	11 October 2011	APPROVED Scale of assessments for the apportionment of the expenses of the United Nations: requests under Article 19 of the Charter.	without vote	Failure of the Central African Republic, Comoros, Guinea-Bissau, Liberia, São Tomé and Príncipe and Somalia to pay minimum dues but they were allowed to vote in the session as there were circumstances beyond their control.	
A/RES/66/5	Plenary	11 (a)	17 October 2011	APPROVED Building a peaceful and better world through sport and the Olympic ideal	without vote	Introduced by Sebastian Coe of London 2012.	
A/RES/66/6	Plenary	41	25 October 2011	APPROVED Necessity of ending the economic, commercial and financial embargo imposed by the United States of America against Cuba	186/2/3	Proposed by Cuban Foreign Minister Bruno Eduardo Rodríguez Parrilla who said the United States had an "hostile and aggressive" for the last 50 years and had instead strengthened its "siege" in a "cruel and opportunistic" way against the principal of non-intervention.	
A/RES/66/7	Plenary	86	2 November	APPROVED Report of the International Atomic Energy Agency	without vote	Discussion was partaken by South Korea, Egypt, Nigeria, Iran, Sudan, Indonesia, Peru, Norway, Ethiopia, Libya, Syria and Malaysia; with the Right of Reply counter discussion by North Korea, South Korea and Japan.	
A/RES/66/8	Committee 5 (Administrative and Budgetary)	135	11 November 2011	APPROVED Programme planning.	without vote	Also filled vacancies on the Board of Auditors, Advisory Committee on Administrative and Budgetary Questions, the Committee on Contributions, the Investments Committee, the Independent Audit Advisory Committee and United Nations Staff Pension Committee.	
A/RES/66/9	Plenary	70 (a)	11 November 2011	APPROVED Emergency humanitarian assistance for the rehabilitation and reconstruction of Belize, Costa Rica, El Salvador, Guatemala, Honduras, Nicaragua and Panama.	without vote	Introduced by El Salvador.	
A/RES/66/10	Plenary	118	18 November 2011	APPROVED United Nations Counter-Terrorism Centre.	without vote	Based at the UN headquarters and funded by Saudi Arabia, who introduced the measure, for three years; however, Syria then withdrew its support. Venezuela also spoke. It would operate under the secretary-general's auspices and within the Counter‑Terrorism Implementation Task Force, while funding would be voluntary. Syria retracted its support for the initiative that had been suggested by Saudi Arabia. The resolution established the centre to be based at the UN itself and under the direction of the secretary-general. Saudi Arabia would fund the institution for three years and it would be reviewed at the sixty-eighth session of the United Nations General Assembly.	
A/RES/66/11	Plenary	120	18 November 2011	APPROVED Restoration of the rights of membership of Libya in the Human Rights Council.	123/4/6	The motion was rejected by Bolivia, Ecuador, Nicaragua and Venezuela, with abstentions from Antigua and Barbuda, Bahamas, Barbados, Botswana, Cuba and Vietnam. Over 50 states were absent for the vote.	
A/RES/66/12	Plenary	118	18 November 2011	REJECTED Terrorist attacks on internationally protected persons.	11/96/43	In regards to the 2011 alleged Iran assassination plot, Saudi Arabia, supported by the U.S., enacted a motion explicitly condemning Iran's alleged involvement in the plot. Iran proposed two separate amendments that would remove six paragraphs in reference to explicit reference to Iran and would amend one paragraph that would ensure the resolution does not consider issues between parties that acceded to the 1973 Convention on Prevention and Punishment of Crimes against Internationally Protected Persons as being outside the jurisdiction of the General Assembly. The first motion was supported by: Bolivia, Chad, Cuba, Democratic People’s Republic of Korea, Ecuador, El Salvador, Iran, Nicaragua, Somalia, Syria, Venezuela.	
A/RES/66/12	Plenary	118	18 November 2011	REJECTED Terrorist attacks on internationally protected persons.	12/94/45	(See above); The second motion was supported by: Belarus, Bolivia, Cuba, Democratic People’s Republic of Korea, Ecuador, El Salvador, Indonesia, Iran, Nicaragua, Somalia, Syria, Venezuela.	
A/RES/66/12	Plenary	118	18 November 2011	APPROVED Terrorist attacks on internationally protected persons.	106/9/40	The draft that passed called upon Iran, as obliged by the convention, to bring to justice those "planning, sponsoring, organis[ing]" the plot. Armenia, Bolivia, Cuba, Ecuador, Iran, North Korea, Nicaragua, Venezuela and Zambia voted against the resolution.	
A/RES/66/13	Plenary	38	21 November 2011	APPROVED The situation in Afghanistan.	without vote	The draft was introduced by Germany. This annual version since the War in Afghanistan featured: transition in the field of security, which were taking place "progressively" with Afghan control of 25% of the population and the hope of half the population soon after; a need for proper training for Afghan security forces, especially operational capabilities; empowerment of the Afghan people and its institutions, especially the role of women and civil society participation, with the goal of better employment prospects so as to reduce poverty; call for justice and the fight against impunity and corruption in order to further developmental objectives; illicit drugs undermined development of a format economic sector and result in funding for "terrorism;" welcomed the UNSC's decision to delineate differences between Al-Qaeda and the Taliban from its sanctions regime; the UN's role in the "Afghan-led peace and reconciliation process;" an emphasis on the regional role in stabilising Afghanistan, particularly in light of the Istanbul Conference; and the humanitarian situation's need for international attention and support, especially the burden of Afghanistan's neighbours, Iran and Pakistan, in hosting an innumerable number of refugees.	
A/RES/66/14	Plenary	37	30 November 2011	APPROVED Committee on the Exercise of the Inalienable Rights of the Palestinian People.	115/8/53	In the context of the International Court of Justice's advisory opinion on the "Legal Consequences of the Construction of a Wall in the Occupied Palestinian Territory" the assembly passed a motion calling on the committee "exert all efforts to promote the realization of the inalienable rights of the Palestinian people, including their right to self-determination, to support the Middle East peace process for the achievement of the two-State solution on the basis of the pre-1967 borders and the just resolution of all final status issues and to mobilize international support for and assistance to the Palestinian people." It also called for the committee to keep reviewing the situation in Palestine, to "continue to extend its cooperation and support to Palestinian and other civil society organizations," requests other UN organs to work with the committee, calls on all governments and organisation to work with the committee to realise its mandate and requests the secretary-general to circulate the committee's report to all the UN's organs, urging them to take action where appropriate and to continue providing the committee the facilities required to carry out its mandate. The motion was rejected by: Australia, Canada, Israel, Marshall Islands, Micronesia (Federated States of), Nauru, Palau, United States.	
A/RES/66/15	Plenary	37	30 November 2011	APPROVED Division for Palestinian Rights of the Secretariat	114/9/54	The motion recognised the work of the Division for Palestinian Rights of the Secretariat as "useful and constructive [in][ raising international awareness of the question of Palestine." It also requests the secretary-general to provide the necessary facilities for the division, calls on the division to continue to monitor the situation in regards to the Question of Palestine, calls on all governments and organisation to work with the division and "as part of the observance of the International Day of Solidarity with the Palestinian People on 29 November, to continue to organize, under the guidance of the Committee on the Exercise of the Inalienable Rights of the Palestinian People, an annual exhibit on Palestinian rights or a cultural event in cooperation with the Permanent Observer Mission of Palestine." The motion was rejected by: Australia, Canada, Israel, Marshall Islands, Micronesia, Nauru, New Zealand Palau and the United States.	
A/RES/66/16	Plenary	37	30 November 2011	APPROVED Special information programme on the question of Palestine of the Department of Public Information of the Secretariat	168/8/3	In the context of the ICJ advisory opinion and mutual recognition of the PA and Israel the resolution called the programme's work integral in that it affords awareness on the Palestinian question. It called on the department to coordinate with the aforementioned committee, to disseminate information on its workings throughout the UN system, to "issue, update[, expand] and modernize publications" on the issue, to further raise general awareness of the issue, to foster media development within Palestinian society and "to formulate ways for the media and representatives of civil society to engage in open and positive discussions to explore means for encouraging people-to-people dialogue and promoting peace and mutual understanding in the region. The motion was rejected by: Australia, Canada, Israel, Marshall Islands, Micronesia, Nauru, Palau and the United States); there were also three abstentions: Cameroon, Honduras and Tonga.	
A/RES/66/17	Plenary	37	30 November 2011	APPROVED Peaceful settlement of the question of Palestine	167/7/4	In the context of the ICJ opinion and the UN's responsibility to see the conflict resolved in a peaceful nature, the resolution also expressed concern for the wall being constructed in the West Bank by the "occupying power" and the Judaization of Jerusalem "including settlement construction and expansion, home demolitions, evictions of Palestinian residents, excavations in and around religious and historic sites, and all other unilateral measures aimed at altering the character, status and demographic composition." It also, notably, expressed "deep concern about the continuing Israeli policy of closures and severe restrictions on the movement of persons and goods, including medical and humanitarian" and the situation as a result of the blockade of the Gaza Strip; while it also supported the "principles for bilateral negotiations, as affirmed by the parties in the Israeli-Palestinian Joint Understanding reached at the international conference held in Annapolis." It hoped for reconciliation between Palestinian factions and called for a peaceful resolution to the conflict and Israel's withdrawal from the territories occupied since 1967. During the debate on the issue, Australia said it chose to abstain instead of rejecting the motion on the premise that it has previously supported the peaceful settlement and supported the reference to the recommendations of the Quartet, the Road Map and the Arab Peace Initiative as "reflect[ing] the will of the international community for a peaceful solution. Such a solution should be based on the 1967 lines and the mutually agreed land swaps." However, it added that the resolution did not sufficiently recognize "Israel’s legitimate security concerns...[as] weapons continued to be smuggled through Gaza, and rockets to be fired into Israel." The U.S. said that it was "troubled by the repetitive, disproportionate and one‑sided annual General Assembly resolutions condemning Israel." Singapore added that it had supported the motion on the "Committee on the Exercise of the Inalienable Rights of the Palestinian People" on the basis of the text "achievement of the two‑State solution on the basis of pre‑1967 borders" being interpreted similarly to that of this resolution, which reads: "...two‑State solution of Israel and Palestine, living side by side in peace and security within recognized borders, based on the pre‑1967 borders." The motion was rejected by: Canada, Israel, Marshall Islands, Micronesia, Nauru, Palau and the United States; while there were four abstentions: Australia, Cameroon, Côte d'Ivoire and Tonga.	
A/RES/66/18	Plenary	36	30 November 2011	APPROVED Jerusalem	164/7/5	The motion was introduced by Egypt, who also thanked Iceland for its recognition of Palestine the previous day, and also sought to "reiterate that any Israeli actions to impose its laws, jurisdiction and administration on Jerusalem were illegal and therefore null and void, as was its decision to occupy the Syrian Golan." The resolution that "any actions taken by Israel, the occupying Power, to impose its laws, jurisdiction and administration on the Holy City of Jerusalem are illegal and therefore null and void and have no validity whatsoever, and calls upon Israel to immediately cease all such illegal and unilateral measures;" as well as any comprehensive and just solution to the management of the city as a whole "should take into account the legitimate concerns of both the Palestinian and Israeli sides and should include internationally guaranteed provisions to ensure the freedom of religion and of conscience of its inhabitants, as well as permanent, free and unhindered access to the holy places by the people of all religions and nationalities;" and it also requested the secretary-general to report to the General Assembly in the next session on the implementation of the resolution.	
A/RES/66/19	Plenary	36	30 November 2011	APPROVED The Syrian Golan	119/7/53	The motion was introduced by Egypt, who sought the same measure as the introduction to the previous resolution. The resolution declared Israel's failure to comply with United Nations Security Council Resolution 497 and that Israel's 14 December 1981 decision to "impose its laws, jurisdiction and administration on the occupied Syrian Golan is null and void" and called on Israel to rescind it; it also asserted that the provisions of the Hague Convention IV of 1907 and the Geneva Convention's "Protection of Civilian Persons in Time of War" apply in this case and should be respected. It concluded: "[The] de facto annexation constitute[s] a stumbling block in the way of achieving a just, comprehensive and lasting peace in the region," while calling on Israel to resume talks on both the Golan Heights and the Shebaa farms, while withdraw from all "occupied Syrian Golan to the line of 4 June 1967." The resolution was rejected by: Canada, Israel, Marshall Islands, Micronesia, Nauru, Palau and the United States. After the votes, there were other delegation that spoke. Argentina, speaking for Brazil as well, said the two states supported the resolution on the premise that it sought to emphasise the illegality of the acquisition of the land by force, though it did not prejudge paragraph six, which demanded Israel withdraw from all of the Golan Heights as per the demarcated boundaries prior to 4 June 1967 and in accord with prior relevant UNSC resolutions. They also called on the need to seek a resolution to the impasse and called on Israel and Syria to resume negotiations on a permanent settlement in accordance with the principle of "land for peace." Iran then said it supported this resolution and that of Jerusalem but insisted on expressing reservations on any part of the resolution that could be read as recognition of Israel; it also added that references to the "peace process" and a "two‑State solution" would only occur "through justice, an end to discrimination, an end to the occupation of all Palestinian territories, the return of all refugees, a resort to democratic means in establishing the wishes of the Palestinian people, and the establishment of an independent, democratic Palestinian State, with Jerusalem as its capital." Syria then thanked all those who voted in favour of the resolution, also noting its consistent approval since 1981, that those who supported it stood up for "right, justice and law," its adoption indicated adherence to the UN Charter and "sent a clear message to Israel that killing, foreign occupation, forcible land annexation, racial discrimination, settlement construction and repression were to be rejected." Palestine then said the resolutions adopted on the day were "consistent with the objectives of peace — the two‑State solution and upholding international law." Speaking during the Right of Reply at the end of the day, Syria said it was "truly concerned and surprised" by attempts from Australia and Japan to stimulate internal tensions in Syria, and more so when the day discussed issues pertaining to Palestine and the "suffering of the Palestinian people." It thus concluded that their objectives were to "divert attention away from the occupation, and the practices that contravened the simplest norms of international law and international humanitarian law. Syria issued strong condemnation of Australia's "far from using diplomatic language" in attacking a symbol of Syria's sovereignty, its Head of State, as "an irresponsible incitement to violence and sent a negative message that supported armed terrorist groups." The delegate also noted Australia's talk about Syria, Yemen, Iran, Egypt, Tunisia and Libya yet refusing to discuss the matter on hand. Iran then spoke to clarify an issue in regards to the violation of the British embassy in Iran in that it had regretted the incidence and previously reiterated a commitment to the Vienna Convention on Consular Relations; it added that a judicial investigation had been undertaken into the incident and who perpetrated it.	
