= Leslie Scanlon =

Canadian Ambassador to Israel

Canadian Ambassador to Israel

Ambassador Extraordinary and Plenipotentiary of Canada to the State of Israel
- Appointed by: Governor General of Canada; On the advice of the Minister of Foreign Affairs
- Monarch: Charles III of Canada
- Governors-General: Mary Simon; Louise Arbour
- Preceded by: Lisa Stadelbauer

High Commissioner of Canada to Pakistan
- In office 2022 to 2025
- Preceded by: Wendy Gilmour
- Succeeded by: Tarik Khan

Ambassador of Canada to Poland
- In office 2018 to 2022
- Preceded by: Stephen de Boer
- Succeeded by: Catherine Godin

Personal details
- Citizenship: Canada
- Education: Carleton University

Leslie Scanlon is a career foreign service official who is the current Canadian Ambassador to Israel. She presented her credentials to Israeli President Herzog in April 2025. Previously she has served as a diplomat in France, High Commissioner of Canada to Pakistan, and Ambassador to Poland.

== Diplomatic work ==
Scanlon met with indigenous filmmaker Crystal Lavallee on an indigenous led trip to Israel organized by the Israeli Embassy in Canada and the International Christian Embassy Jerusalem in 2025. She attended the "People’s Peace Summit" in 2026 along with ambassadors from the EU and France.

== Personal life ==
In her personal life, she enjoys hiking, canoeing, and cycling, and views art as a medium for promoting environmental stewardship.

She was married to reporter Peter O'Neil, and has a daughter who coaches hockey and works in the Canadian government. She also has a son who is attending post secondary school in Toronto.
