= Credibility gap =

Journalistic term

Credibility gap is a term that came into wide use with journalism, political and public discourse in the United States during the 1960s and 1970s. At the time, it was most frequently used to describe public skepticism about the Lyndon B. Johnson administration's statements and policies on the Vietnam War. It was used in journalism as a euphemism for recognized lies told to the public by politicians. Today, it is used more generally to describe almost any "gap" between an actual situation and what politicians and government agencies say about it.

== History ==
The term "credibility gap" came against a background of the use of the term "missile gap", which the Oxford English Dictionary lists as first being used by then-Senator John F. Kennedy on 14 August 1958, when he stated: "Our Nation could have afforded, and can afford now, the steps necessary to close the missile gap." "Doomsday gap" and "mineshaft gap" were the imagined post-apocalyptic continuations of this paranoia in the 1964 Cold War satire Dr. Strangelove.

The term "credibility gap" was widely in use as early as 1963, according to Timetables of History. Prior to its association with the Vietnam War, in December 1962, at the annual meeting of the U.S. Inter-American Council, Republican US Senator for New York Kenneth B. Keating praised President John F. Kennedy's prompt action in the Cuban Missile Crisis, but he said there was an urgent need for the United States to plug the "credibility gap" in U.S. policy on Cuba. It was popularized in 1966 by J. William Fulbright, a Democratic Senator from Arkansas, when he could not get a straight answer from President Johnson's Administration regarding the war in Vietnam.

"Credibility gap" was first used in association with the Vietnam War in the New York Herald Tribune in March 1965, to describe then-president Lyndon Johnson's handling of the escalation of American involvement in the war. A number of events—particularly the 1968 surprise Tet Offensive, and later the 1971 release of the Pentagon Papers—helped to confirm public suspicion that there was a significant "gap" between the administration's declarations of controlled military and political resolution, and the reality. These were viewed as examples of Johnson's and later Richard Nixon's duplicity. Throughout the war, Johnson worked with his officials to ensure that his public addresses would only disclose bare details of the war to the American public. During the war the country grew more and more aware of the credibility gap, especially after Johnson's speech at Johns Hopkins University in April 1965. An example of public opinion appeared in The New York Times concerning the war. "The time has come to call a spade a bloody shovel. This country is in an undeclared and unexplained war in Vietnam. Our masters have a lot of long and fancy names for it, like escalation and retaliation, but it is a war just the same."

The advent of the presence of television journalists allowed by the military to report and photograph events of the war within hours or days of their actual occurrence in an uncensored manner drove the discrepancy widely referred to as "the credibility gap".

== Later usage ==
After the Vietnam War, the term "credibility gap" came to be used by political opponents in cases where an actual, perceived or implied discrepancy existed between a politician's public pronouncements and the actual, perceived or implied reality. For example, in the 1970s the term was applied to Nixon's own handling of the Vietnam War and subsequently to the discrepancy between evidence of Richard Nixon's complicity in the Watergate break-in and his repeated claims of innocence.

Since 2017, the term has been used to describe the Trump administration, particularly in relation to the use of what White House Counsel Kellyanne Conway called alternative facts.

== See also ==
- Denial and deception
- Disinformation
- Knowledge falsification
- Noble lie
- Truthiness
- Tacitus Trap
