= Criticism of Huawei =

The Chinese multinational information technology and consumer electronics company Huawei has faced numerous criticisms for various aspects of its operations, particularly in regards to cybersecurity, intellectual property, and human rights violations.

Huawei has faced allegations, primarily from the United States and its allies, that its wireless networking equipment could contain backdoors enabling surveillance by the Chinese government. Huawei has stated that its products posed "no greater cybersecurity risk" than those of any other vendor, and that there was no evidence of the U.S. espionage claims. The company had also partnered with British officials to establish a laboratory to audit its products.

These concerns intensified with Huawei's involvement in the development of 5G wireless networks, and have led to some countries implementing or contemplating restrictions on the use of Chinese-made hardware in these networks. In March 2019, Huawei sued the U.S. government over a military spending bill that restricted the purchase of equipment from Huawei or ZTE by the government, citing that it had been refused due process. Huawei exited the U.S. market due to these concerns, which had also made U.S. wireless carriers reluctant to sell its products.

Huawei has also faced allegations that it has engaged in corporate espionage to steal competitors' intellectual property, and in 2019, was restricted from performing commerce with U.S. companies, over allegations that it willfully exported technology of U.S. origin to Iran in violation of U.S. sanctions. The company has also been accused of assisting in the mass-detention of Uyghurs in re-education camps, and employing forced Uyghur labour in its supply chain.

== Intellectual property and theft ==
=== Cisco patent lawsuit ===
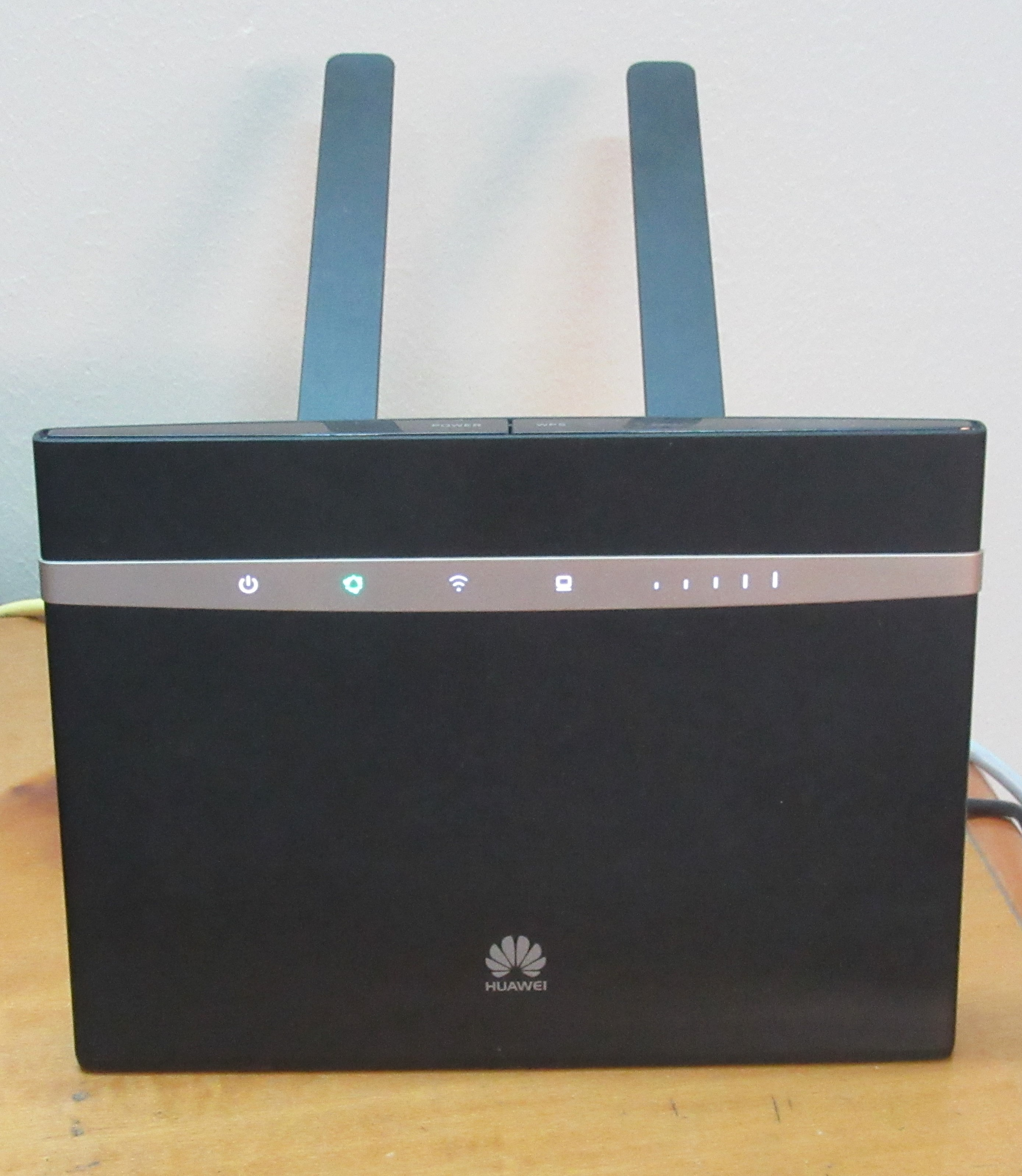
Huawei Dual Band LTE Wi-Fi modem

In 2003 Cisco General Counsel Mark Chandler traveled to Shenzhen to confront Huawei founder Ren Zhengfei with evidence of Huawei's theft of Cisco IP. The evidence included typos from Cisco's technical manuals that also appeared in Huawei's, after being presented with the evidence Ren replied "coincidence".

Huawei said that its U.S. subsidiary Futurewei had withdrawn its Quidway routers from the market in January 2003 and that it subsequently stopped selling other routers using the same software code worldwide. In February 2003, Cisco Systems sued Huawei Technologies for allegedly infringing on its patents and illegally copying source code used in its routers and switches. According to a statement by Cisco, by July 2004 Huawei removed the contested code, manuals and command-line interfaces and the case was subsequently settled out of court. As part of the settlement Huawei admitted that it had copied some of Cisco's router software. Both sides claimed success—with Cisco asserting that "completion of lawsuit marks a victory for the protection of intellectual property rights", and Huawei's partner 3Com (which was not a part of lawsuit) noting that court order prevented Cisco from bringing another case against Huawei asserting the same or substantially similar claims.

Following the settlement between Cisco and Huawei, Cisco, Huawei and 3Com filed a stipulation and order of dismissal with prejudice in the U.S. District Court for the Eastern District of Texas, Marshall Division, under which Cisco's claims against Huawei were dismissed.

Huawei's chief representative in the U.S. subsequently claimed that Huawei had been vindicated in the case, breaking a confidentiality clause of Huawei's settlement with Cisco. In response, Cisco revealed parts of the independent expert's report produced for the case which proved that Huawei had stolen Cisco code and directly copied it into their products. In a company blog post Cisco's Mark Chandler stated that the settled case had included allegations of "direct, verbatim copying of our source code, to say nothing of our command line interface, our help screens, our copyrighted manuals and other elements of our products" by Huawei and provided additional information to support those allegations. Prior to Cisco providing conclusive proof in 2012 the story of Huawei's blatant plagiarism had obtained the status of folklore within the routing and switching community.

=== T-Mobile smartphone testing robot ===
In September 2014, Huawei faced a lawsuit from T-Mobile US, which alleged that Huawei stole technology from its Bellevue, Washington, headquarters. T-Mobile claimed that Huawei's employees snuck into a T-Mobile lab during the period of 2012–2013 and stole parts of its robot Tappy used for testing smartphones. It alleged that the employees then copied the operating software and design details, and Huawei is now using the data to build its own testing robot. Huawei said that it had developed its own testing robot with T-Mobile's knowledge, and that the actions were taken in order to resolve "technical discrepancies" between the two companies' robots. A Huawei spokesman stated to The New York Times that there is some truth to the complaint, but that the two employees involved have been fired. T-Mobile has since stopped using Huawei as a supplier, which T-Mobile says could cost it tens of millions of dollars as it moves away from its handsets.

In May 2017, a jury found that Huawei had misappropriated T-Mobile's trade secrets, but the conduct was not "willful and malicious." It awarded T-Mobile $4.8 million for breach of contract and no damages on the trade-secret claim. Huawei contended that the Tappy robot's secrets had already been publicly disclosed by T-Mobile in 2012. A limited inspection of Huawei's robotics facilities by a third-party expert turned out inconclusively.

=== Motorola patent lawsuit ===
In July 2010, Motorola filed an amended complaint that named Huawei as a co-defendant in its case against Lemko for alleged theft of trade secrets.

=== Motorola–Nokia Siemens Networks sales dispute ===
In January 2011, Huawei filed a lawsuit against Motorola to prevent its intellectual property from being illegally transferred to Nokia Siemens Networks ("NSN") as part of NSN's US$1.2 billion acquisition of Motorola's wireless network business. In April 2011, Motorola and Huawei entered into an agreement to settle all pending litigation, with Motorola paying an undisclosed sum to Huawei for the intellectual property that would be part of the sale to NSN.

=== ZTE patent lawsuit ===
In a further move to protect its intellectual property, Huawei filed lawsuits in Germany, France and Hungary in April 2011 against ZTE for patent and trademark infringement. The following day, ZTE countersued Huawei for patent infringement in China.

=== Nortel ===
Brian Shields, former chief security officer at Nortel, said that his company was compromised in 2004 by China-based hackers; executive credentials were accessed remotely, and entire computers were taken over. Nortel's own specialist did not find any abnormality. In 2008, Shields decided to approach an outside expert, who reported finding sophisticated malware in the company's machines and activities traced to Chinese IP addresses and discussions on a Mandarin Internet forum. Shields had been trying to escalate the issue within the company, but senior staff members did not take any action. A former CSIS official said the agency approached the company but was rebuffed.

Cybersecurity experts have some doubts about a hack of such magnitude as described by Shields, calling it "unlikely". Shields does not think Huawei was directly involved, but industry insiders, including him, believe that Huawei was a beneficiary.

=== Circuit boards ===
In June 2004, a Huawei employee was caught after-hours taking photographs of a piece of Fujitsu networking equipment at the SuperComm trade show. His memory card and hand-drawn diagrams were subsequently confiscated. The employee said he did not know taking photographs were forbidden. Huawei said his action was not authorized and either terminated the employee or reduced his pay, according to various reports. The employee denied the accusation, but was later dismissed.

=== Akhan Semiconductor diamond glass ===
Huawei was under investigation by FBI in the United States for sending some diamond glass samples developed by the company Akhan Semiconductor to China without authorization to test and destroy the product in order to steal intellectual property.

=== CNEX Labs ===
CNEX Labs claims that a Huawei executive, with the help of a Chinese university, attempted to steal CNEX's solid-state drive computer storage technology. In December 2017, Huawei and its subsidiary Futurewei sued CNEX Labs and its co-founder Yiren "Ronnie" Huang, a former Huawei employee for alleged trade secret misappropriation and employee poaching. CNEX counterclaimed that Huawei had tried to steal its solid-state drive storage technology. In June 2019, the jury rejected Huawei's misappropriation claims, found that Huawei had misappropriated one of CNEX's trade secrets and Huang had breached his employment agreement. No damages was awarded to either side.

== Espionage and security concerns ==
=== 2000s ===
In the U.S., officials and politicians within the federal government have raised concerns that Huawei-made telecommunications equipment may be designed to allow unauthorised access by the Chinese government and the Chinese People's Liberation Army, given that Ren Zhengfei, the founder of the company, served as an engineer in the army in the early 1980s. The Committee on Foreign Investment in the United States scrutinized a deal by Bain Capital to acquire 3Com with Huawei as a minority investor, and an attempt to acquire the virtualization firm 3Leaf Systems, both due to security concerns (with concerns that China could gain access to U.S. military-grade technology in the case of the former). Both deals fell through. In 2010, Sprint Nextel blocked bids by Huawei on a supply contract, after the company was contacted by the Secretary of Commerce.

In the United Kingdom, the Conservative Party raised concerns about security over Huawei's bid for Marconi in 2005, and the company's equipment was mentioned as an alleged potential threat in a 2009 government briefing by Alex Allan, chairman of the Joint Intelligence Committee. In November 2010, Huawei agreed to proactively allow local officials to perform cybersecurity examinations of its products, resulting in the opening of the Huawei Cyber Security Evaluation Centre (HCSEC). Its oversight board includes members of the National Cyber Security Centre and GCHQ.

In October 2009, the Indian Department of Telecommunications reportedly requested national telecom operators to "self-regulate" the use of all equipment from European, U.S. and Chinese telecoms manufacturers following security concerns. Earlier, in 2005, Huawei was blocked from supplying equipment to India's Bharat Sanchar Nigam Limited (BSNL) cellular phone service provider. In 2010, the Indian Central Bureau of Investigation (CBI) insisted on cancelling the rest of the Huawei contract with BSNL and pressed charges against several top BSNL officers regarding their "doubtful integrity and dubious links with Chinese firms". In June 2010, an interim solution was introduced that would allow the import of Chinese-made telecoms equipment to India if pre-certified by international security agencies such as Canada's Electronic Warfare Associates, U.S.-based Infoguard, and Israel's ALTAL Security Consulting.

=== Early 2010s ===
In a 2011 open letter, Huawei stated that the security concerns are "unfounded and unproven" and called on the U.S. government to investigate any aspect of its business. The U.S.-based non-profit organisation Asia Society carried out a review of Chinese companies trying to invest in the U.S., including Huawei. The organisation found that only a few investment deals were blocked following unfavorable findings by the CFIUS or had been given a recommendation not to apply. However, all large transactions had been politicised by groups including the U.S. media, members of Congress and the security community. However, another article unrelated to the report published by the Asia Society reported that, "fear that the P.R.C. government could strongarm private or unaffiliated Chinese groups into giving up cyber-secrets is reflected in the U.S. government's treatment of Chinese telecom company Huawei."

In December 2011, Bloomberg reported that the U.S. is invoking Cold War-era national security powers to force telecommunication companies including AT&T Inc. and Verizon Communications Inc. to divulge confidential information about their networks in a hunt for Chinese cyber-spying. The U.S. House Intelligence Committee had said on 18 November that it would investigate foreign companies, and a spokesman for Huawei said that the company conducts its businesses according to normal business practices and actually welcomed the investigation. On 8 October 2012, the Committee issued a report concluding Huawei and ZTE were a "national security threat". However, a 2012 White House-ordered review found no concrete evidence to support the House report's espionage allegations.

In March 2012, Australian media sources reported that the Australian government had excluded Huawei from tendering for contracts with NBN Co, a government-owned corporation that is managing the construction of the National Broadband Network, following advice from the Australian Security Intelligence Organisation regarding security concerns. The Attorney-General's Department stated in response to these reports that the National Broadband Network is "a strategic and significant government investment, [and] we have a responsibility to do our utmost to protect its integrity and that of the information carried on it."

On 9 October 2012, a spokesperson for prime minister Stephen Harper indicated that the Canadian government invoked a national security exception to exclude Huawei from its plans to build a secure government communications network.

On 19 July 2013, Michael Hayden, former head of the U.S. National Security Agency and director of Motorola Solutions, claimed that he has seen hard evidence of backdoors in Huawei's networking equipment and that the company engaged in espionage and shared intimate knowledge of the foreign telecommunications systems with the Chinese government. Huawei and Motorola Solutions had previously been engaged in intellectual property disputes for a number of years. Huawei's global cybersecurity officer, John Suffolk, described the comments made by Hayden as "tired, unsubstantiated, defamatory remarks" and challenged him and other critics to present any evidence publicly.

In 2014, The New York Times reported, based upon documents leaked by Edward Snowden, that the U.S. National Security Agency has since 2007 been operating a covert program against Huawei. This involved breaking into Huawei's internal networks, including headquarters networks and founder Ren Zhengfei's communications. In 2014, Huawei reached a sponsorship deal with the NFL's Washington Redskins to install free public Wi-Fi at FedExField, but the agreement was abruptly shelved weeks after it was announced due to unofficial action by a U.S. government advisor.

In 2016, Canada's immigration department said it planned to deny permanent resident visas to three Chinese citizens who worked for Huawei over concerns the applicants are involved in espionage, terrorism, and government subversion.

=== Late 2010s ===
In 2018, an investigation by French newspaper Le Monde alleged that China had engaged in hacking the African Union headquarters in Ethiopia from 2012 to 2017. The building was built by Chinese contractors, including Huawei, and Huawei equipment has been linked to these hacks. The Chinese government denied that they bugged the building, stating that the accusations were "utterly groundless and ridiculous." Ethiopian Prime Minister Hailemariam Desalegn rejected the French media report. Moussa Faki Mahamat, head of the African Union Commission, said the allegations in the Le Monde report were false. "These are totally false allegations and I believe that we are completely disregarding them."

On 17 April 2018, the Federal Communications Commission (FCC) held a preliminary, 5–0 vote on rules forbidding the use of government subsidies to purchase telecom equipment from companies deemed to be a risk to national security. A draft of the policy specifically named Huawei and ZTE as examples. The same day, the company revealed plans to downplay the U.S. market as part of its future business plans, citing the government scrutiny as having impeded its business there.

In August 2018, U.S. president Donald Trump signed the National Defense Authorization Act for Fiscal Year 2019, which contains a provision barring the U.S. government from purchasing hardware from Huawei or ZTE, under cybersecurity ground. In retaliation for the aforementioned campaigns and legislation targeting the company, Huawei sued the U.S. government in March 2019, alleging that it has "repeatedly failed to produce any evidence to support its restrictions", and that Congress failed to provide it due process.

In March 2019, the HCSEC Oversight Board published a report stating that it had "continued to identify concerning issues in Huawei's approach to software development bringing significantly increased risk to UK operators", and that it had "not yet seen anything to give it confidence in Huawei's capacity to successfully complete the elements of its transformation programme that it has proposed as a means of addressing these underlying defects". The report cited, in particular, use of outdated versions of VxWorks in its networking equipment and inconsistent checksums between OS images, and during a visit to a Huawei development centre in Shanghai, it was found that Huawei had been using an "unmanageable number" of OpenSSL revisions between individual products.

On 30 April 2019, Bloomberg News published a report alleging that between 2009 and 2011, Vodafone Italy had discovered several security vulnerabilities in its Huawei fixed-line network equipment, including unspecified backdoors in optical nodes and broadband gateways, and unsecured telnet on its home routers that could give Huawei access to Vodafone's network. The report claimed that despite having claimed to have patched them, some of them had persisted through 2012, and that the same vulnerabilities could be found in Huawei equipment used by other regional Vodafone subsidiaries. Both Huawei and Vodafone disputed Bloomberg's allegations: Huawei stated that the alleged security vulnerabilities had been patched after they were discovered and reported, and described the alleged "backdoors" as "technical mistakes" that had been "put right". Historically telnet has been commonly used in the industry for remote operation. It is a standard text based interface to a remote host. Vodafone stated that the interface would not have been accessible from the internet, that it was "nothing more than a failure to remove a diagnostic function after development", and there was no evidence of any actual breaches.

On 15 May 2019, Trump issued the Executive Order on Securing the Information and Communications Technology and Services Supply Chain, which gives the government power to restrict any transactions with "foreign adversaries" that involve information and communications technology. The same day, also citing violations of economic sanctions against Iran, the U.S. Department of Commerce added Huawei and its affiliates to its Entity List under the Export Administration Regulations. This restricts U.S. companies from doing business with Huawei without government permission. On 19 May 2019, Reuters reported that Google had suspended Huawei's ability to use the Android operating system on its devices with licensed Google Mobile Services, due to these restrictions. The next day, it was reported that Intel, Qualcomm, and Xilinx had stopped supplying components to Huawei.

On 16 May 2019, Dutch newspaper de Volkskrant said Dutch intelligence agency AIVD had received a report about backdoors on Huawei equipment belonging to a Dutch carrier and was determining whether or not the situation allowed espionage by the Chinese government. Huawei denied allegations of spying. Dutch telecom operator KPN said the report was compiled for risk management and no supplier had unlimited access to its networks.

In 2019, a report commissioned by the Papua New Guinea (PNG) National Cyber Security Centre, funded by the Australian government, alleged that a data center built by Huawei for the PNG government contained exploitable security flaws. "It is assessed with high confidence that data flows could be easily intercepted," said the 2019 report on PNG's National Data Centre. The report noted the layout of the data centre did not match the intended design, opening up major security gaps. The project was part of a US$147 million digital support package from China to PNG which is also funding a national broadband network. Huawei told the AFR that the data centre project "conforms to appropriate industry standards and customer requirements". The AFR says that the firewalls had already reached their end of life in 2016—two years before the centre became operational. The paper quotes the security report as saying: "The main switches are not behind the firewalls. This means that remote access would not be detected by the security settings within the appliances." Huawei responded that the project "complies with appropriate industry standards and the requirements of the customer." The Government of Papua New Guinea has called the data centre a 'failed investment' and attempted to have the loan cancelled.

=== 2020s ===
In June 2020, the head of France's cybersecurity agency, the Agence nationale de la sécurité des systèmes d'information, stated that he would encourage telecom operators not to use Huawei equipment while not outright banning Huawei.

On 28 August 2020, President Emmanuel Macron said, France will not formally exclude Chinese telecom giant Huawei for its upcoming 5G telecommunication networks, but favored European providers for security reasons. However all Huawei components used in 5G networks would have to be phased out by 2028 placing a de facto ban on Huawei.

On 15 April 2021, the Romanian government approved a law that aims to exclude Chinese group Huawei from the future 5G mobile network. According to the draft proposals, telecommunications companies may not be considered in Romania because of "risks, threats or vulnerabilities to national security".

On 15 August 2021, according to Engadget, Huawei was accused of pressuring a U.S. firm to install a data backdoor for a law enforcement safer-cities project in Lahore, Pakistan. The system supposedly gave Huawei access to a database that helped it collect sensitive citizen and government data "important to Pakistan's national security."

=== Chinese law requirement ===
In December 2018, Arne Schönbohm, head of Germany's Federal Office for Information Security (BSI), stated that the country had not seen evidence that Huawei used its equipment to conduct espionage on behalf of China. That month, it was also reported that the Japanese government had ceased future procurement of Huawei and ZTE products.

The Czech Republic's cybersecurity agency issued a warning against Huawei and ZTE products, arguing that Chinese law required companies to "cooperate with intelligence services, therefore introducing them into the key state systems might present a threat". Huawei refuted the arguments, stating that it is not required to include backdoors in its products, nor has the company ever received any requests to do so. Shortly afterward, prime minister Andrej Babiš ordered that government offices cease using Huawei and ZTE products. However, the ban was reversed after the agency's claims were found to be without basis.

Huawei commissioned attorneys of the London-based law firm Clifford Chance and Beijing-based law firm Zhong Lun to review two Chinese bills commonly cited in these allegations (the 2017 National Intelligence Law, and the 2014 Counter-Espionage Law). The review concluded that there was no such requirement in Chinese law for backdoors to be included in telecom equipment, and that the laws were directed more towards the actual operators of telecom services, and not extraterritorial. The review was published in a Wired opinion piece by Zhou Hanhua. While Huawei has claimed the Clifford Chance review as "independent legal opinions", the review contains an explicit disclaimer from Clifford Chance that the material "should not be construed as constituting a legal opinion on the application of PRC law". Follow up reporting from Wired cast doubt on these findings, particularly because the Chinese "government doesn't limit itself to what the law explicitly allows" when it comes to national security. "All Chinese citizens and organisations are obliged to cooperate upon request with PRC intelligence operations—and also maintain the secrecy of such operations", as explicitly stipulated in Article 7 of the 2017 PRC national intelligence-gathering activities law.

=== 5G networks ===
Four members of the Five Eyes international intelligence alliance—Australia, New Zealand, the United Kingdom and the U.S.—have declared the use of Huawei telecommunications equipment, particularly in 5G networks, poses "significant security risks", while Canada is carrying out its own security review; only Britain is permitting the company to participate in the rollout of the new technology. In late November 2018, the New Zealand signals intelligence agency Government Communications Security Bureau blocked telecommunications company Spark from using Huawei equipment in its planned 5G upgrade, claiming that it posed a "significant network security risk." The NZ ban followed a similar ban in Australia in August 2018.

In October 2018, BT Group announced that it had been phasing out Huawei equipment from "core" components of its wireless infrastructure (excluding parts such as phone mast antennas), including its 5G services, and the Emergency Services Network project.

In December 2018, Gavin Williamson, the UK's Defence Secretary, expressed "grave" and "very deep concerns" about the company providing technology to upgrade Britain's services to 5G. He accused Beijing of acting "sometimes in a malign way". Alex Younger, the former head of MI6, also raised questions about Huawei's role.

On 11 January 2019, Poland announced that two people working on a 5G Huawei network had been arrested: Wang Weijing (a Huawei executive), and Piotr Durbajło, a consultant having worked for Polish domestic security, but currently working for Orange on 5G network testing.

In November 2019, the Chinese ambassador to Denmark, in meetings with high-ranking Faroese politicians, directly linked Huawei's 5G expansion with Chinese trade, according to a sound recording obtained by Kringvarp Føroya. According to Berlingske, the ambassador threatened with dropping a planned trade deal with the Faroe Islands, if the Faroese telecom company Føroya Tele did not let Huawei build the national 5G network. Huawei said they did not know about the meetings.

In March 2019, the $200 million bid by TDC to install the 5G network in Denmark came down to Ericsson and Huawei. Huawei resubmitted their "final offer" that came in suspiciously below Ericsson's bid, which spurred investigators to look for a leak. They found suspicious behavior by a TDC mechanical engineer, long-range microphones installed in their company boardroom, a denial-of-service attack on their corporate network, surveillance of company employees, a break-in at a TDC executive's vacation home, and drones spying on meetings.

=== Consumer electronics ===
In 2015, German cybersecurity company G Data Software alleged that phones from Huawei and several other Chinese manufacturers had been shipped with malware via infected versions of legitimate apps, that could record phone calls, access user data, and send premium SMS messages. A Huawei spokesperson told G Data these breaches were likely to have taken place further down the supply chain, outside the manufacturing process. In January 2018, with the proposal of the Defending US Government Communications Act (which would ban the use of Huawei and ZTE products and equipment by U.S. government entities), calls for the FCC to investigate the company, as well as government pressure, it was reported that U.S. carrier AT&T had abruptly pulled out of an agreement to offer its Mate 10 Pro smartphone, while Verizon Communications had declined to carry any future Huawei products.

On 14 February 2018, heads of six U.S. intelligence agencies testified to the Senate Select Committee on Intelligence against the use of Chinese telecom products by U.S. citizens, such as those of Huawei and ZTE. Christopher A. Wray, director of the FBI, stated that they were "deeply concerned about the risks of allowing any company or entity that is beholden to foreign governments that don't share our values to gain positions of power inside our telecommunications networks". Huawei responded to the allegations, arguing that its products "[pose] no greater cybersecurity risk than any ICT vendor, sharing as we do common global supply chains and production capabilities," and that it was "aware of a range of U.S. government activities seemingly aimed at inhibiting Huawei's business in the U.S. market". In March 2018, it was reported that Best Buy, the country's largest electronics store chain, would no longer sell Huawei products.

In May 2019 a Huawei Mediapad M5 belonging to a Canadian IT engineer living in Taiwan was found to be sending data to servers in China despite never being authorized to do so. The apps could not be disabled and continued to send sensitive data even after appearing to be deleted.

=== Security exploits ===
In July 2012, Felix Lindner and Gregor Kopf gave a conference at Defcon to announce that they uncovered several critical vulnerabilities in Huawei routers (models AR18 and AR29) which could be used to get remote access to the device. The researchers said that Huawei "doesn't have a security contact for reporting vulnerabilities, doesn't put out security advisories and doesn't say what bugs have been fixed in its firmware updates", and as a result, the vulnerabilities have not been publicly disclosed. Huawei replied that they were investigating the claims.

In January 2019, Huawei patched a security flaw that was discovered by Microsoft in the "PCManager" software bundled on its laptops, after detecting that the software used a driver with behavior similar to the DoublePulsar exploit.

In March 2019, the Oversight Board of the UK government's Huawei Cyber Security Evaluation Centre found "serious and systematic defects" in Huawei software engineering and their cyber security competence, and cast doubt on Huawei's ability and competence to fix security problems that have been found, although they do not believe these flaws are caused by Chinese government interference.

In October 2019 a person named John Wu presented details regarding Huawei's Undocumented APIs which can poses security risk for Huawei clients (for example it let apps with Admin privileges install new system apps on the Mate 30). Those permissions are used by the "LZPlay" app to install the Google framework and services. Huawei has denied any involvement with the app or the "LZPlay" site.

In February 2020, The Wall Street Journal reported that Huawei has had the ability to covertly exploit backdoors intended for law enforcement officials since 2009. These backdoors are found on carrier equipment like antennas and routers. Huawei's equipment is widely used around the world due to its low cost.

== U.S. business restrictions ==
In August 2018, the National Defense Authorization Act for Fiscal Year 2019 (NDAA 2019) was signed into law, containing a provision that banned Huawei and ZTE equipment from being used by the U.S. federal government, citing security concerns. Huawei filed a lawsuit over the act in March 2019, alleging it to be unconstitutional because it specifically targeted Huawei without granting it a chance to provide a rebuttal or due process.

On 15 May 2019, the Department of Commerce added Huawei and 70 foreign subsidiaries and "affiliates" to its entity list under the Export Administration Regulations, citing the company having been indicted for "knowingly and willfully causing the export, re-export, sale and supply, directly and indirectly, of goods, technology and services (banking and other financial services) from the United States to Iran and the government of Iran without obtaining a license from the Department of Treasury's Office of Foreign Assets Control (OFAC)". This restricts U.S. companies from doing business with Huawei without a government license.

Various U.S.-based companies immediately froze their business with Huawei to comply with the regulation, including Google—which removes its ability to certify future devices and updates for the Android operating system with licensed Google Mobile Services (GMS) such as Google Play Store, as well as Broadcom, Intel, Qualcomm, Microsoft, Xilinx and Western Digital. The German chipmaker Infineon Technologies also voluntarily suspended its business with Huawei, pending "assessments". It was reported that Huawei did have a limited "stockpile" of U.S.-sourced parts, obtained prior to the sanctions.

On 17 May 2019, Huawei voluntarily suspended its membership to JEDEC, as a temporary measure, "until the restrictions imposed by the U.S. government are removed". Speaking to Chinese media, Huawei founder Ren Zhengfei accused U.S. politicians of underestimating the company's strength, and explained that "in terms of 5G technologies, others won't be able to catch up with Huawei in two or three years. We have sacrificed ourselves and our families for our ideal, to stand on top of the world. To reach this ideal, sooner or later there will be conflict with the US."

Kevin Wolf, an international trade lawyer and former assistant secretary of commerce for export administration during the Obama administration, argued that Huawei could not even use the open source Android Open Source Project (AOSP) code, as it could fall under U.S. trade regulations as technology of U.S. origin because Google is the majority developer. In China, it is normal for Android phones (including those of Huawei) to not include Google Play Store or GMS, as Google does not do business in the region. Phones are typically bundled with an AOSP-based distribution built around an OEM's own software suite, including either a first-party app store run by the OEM (such as Huawei's own AppGallery) or a third-party service.

Google issued a statement assuring that user access to Google Play on existing Huawei devices would not be disrupted. Huawei made a similar pledge of continued support for existing devices, including security patches, but did not make any statements regarding the availability of future Android versions (such as Android 10). On 19 May 2019, the Department of Commerce granted Huawei a temporary, three-month license to continue doing business with U.S. companies for the purposes of maintaining its existing smartphone and telecom products without interruption, whilst long-term solutions are determined.

On 22 May 2019, Arm Holdings also suspended its business with Huawei, including all "active contracts, support entitlements, and any pending engagements". Although it is a Japanese-owned company based in the UK, Arm cited that its intellectual property contained technologies of U.S. origin that it believed were covered under the Department of Commerce order. This prevents Huawei from manufacturing chips that use the ARM architecture. It was also reported that several Asian wireless carriers, including Japan's SoftBank and KDDI, and Taiwan's Chunghwa Telecom and Taiwan Mobile, had suspended the sale of upcoming Huawei devices such as the P30 Lite, citing uncertainties over the effects of the U.S. sanctions on the availability of the Android platform. NTT docomo similarly suspended pre-orders of new Huawei phones, without citing any reasoning.

On 23 May 2019, it was reported that the SD Association had removed Huawei from its list of members—implicating a revocation of its membership to the association. The same day, Toshiba briefly suspended all shipments to Huawei, as a temporary measure while determining whether or not they were selling U.S. made components or technologies to Huawei. Panasonic also stated that it had determined its business relationship to be in compliance with U.S. law, and would not suspend it. The next day, the Wi-Fi Alliance also "temporarily restricted" Huawei's membership.

On 24 May 2019, Huawei told Reuters that FedEx attempted to divert two packages sent from Japan and addressed to Huawei in China to the United States, and tried to divert two more packages sent from Vietnam to Huawei offices elsewhere in Asia, all without their authorization. At first, FedEx China claimed that "media reports are not true". On May 28, however, they apologized on their Chinese social media account for the fact that "a small number of Huawei shipments were misrouted", and claimed that "there are no external parties that require FedEx to ship these shipments".

On 29 May 2019, it was reported that Huawei was once again listed as member of JEDEC, the SD Association, and Wi-Fi Alliance. In addition, while the science organization IEEE had initially banned Huawei employees from peer-reviewing papers or handling papers as editors on 30 May 2019, citing legal concerns, that ban was also revoked on 3 June 2019.

On 31 May 2019, it was reported that Huawei had temporarily stopped its smartphone production lines. On 17 June 2019, it was reported that Huawei was preparing for a sales drop of US$30 Billion, selling 40 million to 60 million smartphones less than last year in overseas markets.

On 29 June 2019 at the G20 summit, Trump and Chinese president and general secretary Xi Jinping agreed to resume trade negotiations. Trump made statements implicating plans to ease the restrictions on U.S. companies doing business with Huawei, explaining that they had sold a "tremendous amount of products" to the company, that they "were not exactly happy that they couldn't sell", and that he was referring to "equipment where there's no great national security problem with it." BBC News considered this move to be a "significant concession".

On 25 October 2019, Arm Holdings stated that it would continue to allow Huawei to license its technology, as it determined that its recent architectures were sufficiently considered to be of British origin and not subject to the sanctions.

On 15 May 2020, the U.S. Department of Commerce extended its export restrictions to bar Huawei from producing semiconductors derived from technology or software of U.S. origin, even if the manufacturing is performed overseas.

=== Replacement operating systems ===
During the sanctions, it was noted that Huawei had been working on its own in-house operating system codenamed "HongMeng OS": in an interview with Die Welt, executive Richard Yu stated that an in-house OS could be used as a "plan B" if it were prevented from using Android or Windows as the result of U.S. action, but that he would "prefer to work with the ecosystems of Google and Microsoft". Efforts to develop an in-house OS at Huawei date back as far as 2012. Huawei filed trademarks for the names "Ark", "Ark OS", and "Harmony" in Europe, which were speculated to be connected to this OS.

In June 2019, Huawei communications VP Andrew Williamson told Reuters that the company was testing HongMeng in China, and that it could be ready "in months". However, in July 2019, chairman Liang Hua and senior vice president Catherine Chen stated that Hongmeng OS was not actually intended as a mobile operating system for smartphones, and was actually an embedded operating system designed for Internet of things (IoT) hardware.

On 19 August 2019, the BIS added 46 "non-U.S. affiliates of Huawei to the Entity List because they also pose a significant risk of involvement in activities contrary to the national security or foreign policy interests of the United States."

In September 2019, Huawei began offering the Chinese Linux distribution Deepin as an optional pre-loaded operating system on selected Matebook models in China, as an alternative to Windows.

=== Support for Huawei from business partners ===
In September 2019, Microsoft's top lawyer and president Brad Smith expressed concern about the continued U.S. ban of Huawei products and services. In an interview with Bloomberg Businessweek, he remarked that the ban should not be imposed without a "sound basis in fact, logic, and the rule of law". Microsoft Corporation, which supplies Windows 10 for Huawei PCs, says the allegations by the Trump administration that Huawei is a genuine national security threat to the U.S. are not supported by any evidence.

== Human rights abuses ==
Huawei has been alleged to play a role in the Chinese government's persecution of the Uyghur population in Xinjiang and other ethnic and religious groups. It is also alleged to have forced labour by Uyghurs in its supply chain.

On 15 June 2020, U.S. Secretary of State Mike Pompeo announced that the country will impose VISA restrictions on Huawei employees as the Chinese company Huawei, provides material support to the Chinese government in carrying human rights abuses.

In December 2020, it was reported that Huawei assisted in creating facial recognition software for identifying Uyghurs. Later in the same month, French footballer Antoine Griezmann formally cut ties with the company, citing "strong suspicions that Huawei has contributed to the development of a 'Uighur alert'". In response to this criticism, Huawei did not deny the existence of Uyghur recognition, instead referring to such software as "a test" that had "not seen real-world application." These claims have been contested however, as they rely solely on a single line in one of Huawei's patents, which due to the nature of Mandarin can be ambiguously translated. The patent reads "持离线文件维族告警", one possible translation of which is "support offline file Uyghur alert". However, as the line is found in a section of the patent detailing exception handling and file processing, another possible and potentially more accurate translation is "support exception handling for offline file grouping", wherein "维族" (Uighurs) is read separately as "维" (maintain) and "族" (ethnic group).

== Opaque ownership ==
Huawei claims to be a privately held, employee-owned company: founder Ren Zhengfei retains approximately 1 percent of the shares of Huawei's holding company, Huawei Investment & Holding, with the remainder of the shares held by a trade union committee that also provides services for its staff. This is also due to a limitation in Chinese law preventing limited liability companies from having more than 50 shareholders (the employees' interest is treated as a single share via the union). Although employee shareholders receive dividends, their shares do not entitle them to any direct influence in management decisions. Ren has the power to veto any decision made by the board of directors.

A 2019 research paper published by Donald Clarke of George Washington University and Christopher Balding of Fulbright University Vietnam accused Huawei of being "effectively state-owned" due to this structure "if the trade union and its committee function as trade unions generally function in China" (being required to be associated with a labor federation tied to the Chinese Communist Party). They also claimed that the arrangement was only a profit-sharing arrangement and not actual ownership. Chief secretary of the board Jiang Xisheng disputed the paper, stating that its authors had "an incomplete understanding of Huawei's corporate policies and a limited knowledge of its ownership structure". Spalding defended the research, telling The Nikkei that "believing Huawei would defy Beijing defies credibility. With the Communist Party actively overseeing and enforcing regulations and state interests abroad, it simply does not match the facts of Chinese interest in promoting companies and interests abroad that Huawei could refuse to assist if asked."

Some Huawei employees initiated legal challenges against the company regarding the employee stock for the year 2003 on a Chinese court, however both the Shenzhen city Intermediate people's court and the Guangdong province High people's court ruled that their stock ownership are for reference only and there are no legal basis to employees' claims on their ownership of Huawei's stock.

On 7 October 2020, the U.K. Parliament's Defence Committee released a report claiming that there was evidence of collusion between Huawei and Chinese state and the Chinese Communist Party. The U.K. Parliament's Defence Committee said that the conclusion was evidenced by Huawei's ownership model and government subsidies it had received.

== Treatment of workforce and customers ==
A United States Army Strategic Studies Institute report on Argentina published in September 2007 describes Huawei as "known to bribe and trap clients". The report details unfair business practices, such as customers framed by "full-paid trips" to China and monetary "presents" offered and later used by Huawei as "a form of extortion".

According to a WikiLeaks cable, in 2006, Michael Joseph, then-CEO of Safaricom Ltd, allegedly struggled to cancel a contract with Huawei due to poor after-sales experience, after which the Kenyan government pressured him to reinstate the contract. When questioned regarding this incident, Joseph replied, "It [the cable] is not a reflection of the truth as evidenced by Safaricom being a major purchaser of Huawei products including all 3G, switching and the recent OCS billing system upgraded over the weekend."

In May 2010, it was reported in The Times of India, that security agencies in India became suspicious of Chinese Huawei employees after learning that Indian employees allegedly did not have access to part of Huawei's Bangalore research and development (R&D) office building. Huawei responded that the company employs over 2,000 Indian engineers and just 30 Chinese engineers in the R&D center in Bangalore, and "both Indian and Chinese staff have equal access rights to all our information assets and facilities". According to The Times of India, the intelligence agencies also noted that Chinese employees of Huawei had extended their stay in Bangalore for many months. Huawei stated that many of these employees were on one-and-a-half-year international assignments to serve as a technical bridge between in-market teams and China, and that "all the Chinese employees had valid visas and did not overstay".

In October 2007, 7,000 Huawei employees resigned and were then rehired on short-term contracts, thereby apparently avoiding the unlimited contract provisions of the Labour Contract Law of the People's Republic of China. The company denied it was exploiting loopholes in the law, while the move was condemned by local government and trade unions.

Huawei's treatment of its workforce in Guangdong, Southern China, also triggered a media outcry after a 25-year-old software engineer, Hu Xinyu, died in May 2006 from bacterial encephalitis, as a result of what is believed to have been work-related fatigue.

In its 2010 Corporate Social Responsibility report, Huawei highlighted the importance of employee health and safety. In 2010, Huawei provided annual health checks to all full-time employees and performed 3,200 checks to employees exposed to occupational health risks.

In early 2018, Li Hongyuan was urged to resign by Huawei's HR in Shenzhen. Li asked for compensation based on the Labor Law of China. In late 2018, Huawei's HR transferred 300,000 yuan to Li via a personal account. Then Huawei reported to the police for racketeering and blackmailing because Huawei asserted that Li threatened to "report business fraud" as a condition of resignation. The police then detained Li on 16 December 2018 and arrested him on 22 January 2019. According to a secret recording tape provided by Li's wife, the two-hour negotiation between Li and Huawei's HR did not mention any Huawei's allegations. Li was released after 251 days in prison. In December 2019, The Guardian reported that police are commonly deployed against former employees, thereby raising questions on Huawei's links to the state. Reports and trending hashtags about the detentions have been censored in China, and the Communist Youth League of China posted an article online claiming that protesters in Hong Kong had passed information about Li's case to destabilise China after The Guardian reported the case.

== State subsidy and dumping ==
According to a report, Huawei have been working closely with the China Development Bank in foreign markets since 2004.

Huawei has been reported to be a key recipient of Chinese state subsidies, having acquired land for facilities and employee housing at significantly below-market prices, receiving state grants for its R&D activities and being a key recipient of export financing with state loans being granted to overseas customers to fund their purchases of Huawei equipment. The Central Intelligence Agency has claimed that it is in possession of unreleased evidence that confirms that Huawei has been funded by China's military and intelligence agencies.

In year 2011, the U.S. Export-Import Bank President Fred Hochberg alleged the China Development Bank credit as one of the main reason behind Huawei's rapid growth, however Huawei rejected the claim as "fundamentally incorrect" despite admitting the existence of those credits.

In 2012, Huawei president Ren Zhengfei have stated that, "without government protection, Huawei would no longer be alive."

In 2013, European Union found that Huawei and ZTE have violated EU's anti-dumping and anti-subsidy guidelines, however Huawei denied the finding and claim they are always playing fairly.

In 2016, The Indian government found that Chinese telecommunication equipment makers including Huawei have been continually dumping equipment into the Indian market and causing injury to local companies. As a result, the Indian government applied an anti-dumping duty to equipment imported from Chinese equipment makers, including Huawei. The duties applied to Huawei were levied at a rate of 37.73%.

== Alleged violation of economic sanctions and technology theft ==
=== Iran ===
On 25 October 2012, the Reuters news agency published a report, based on documents and interviews, alleging an Iranian-based seller of Huawei (Soda Gostar Persian Vista) tried to sell embargoed American antenna equipment (made by American company Andrew LLC) to an Iranian firm (MTN Irancell). Specifically, the Andrew antennas were part of a large order for Huawei telecommunications gear that MTN Irancell had placed through Soda Gostar, but the MTN Irancell says it cancelled the deal with Huawei when it learned the items were subject to sanctions and before any equipment was delivered. Vic Guyang, a Huawei spokesman, acknowledged that MTN Irancell had cancelled the order; Rick Aspan, a spokesman for CommScope, said the company was not aware of the aborted transaction.

In December 2012, Reuters reported the "deep links" existed as early as 2010 between Huawei through Meng Wanzhou (who was then CFO of the firm) and an Iranian telecom importer named Skycom. At least 1.3 million Euros worth of embargoed Hewlett-Packard computer equipment was sold to "Iran's largest mobile-phone operator in late 2010". The next month, Reuters detailed more Huawei behaviour, including direct governance by Meng of Skycom. Meanwhile, the U.S. had long-standing sanctions on Iran, including against the importation of U.S. technology goods into Iran. At some point in 2018, the U.S. Attorney-General filed charges in court against Huawei and, in particular, Meng.

In April 2018, it was reported that the U.S. Justice Department had joined the U.S. Treasury Department's Office of Foreign Assets Control, or OFAC, and the Department of Commerce, to investigate possible violations of economic sanctions by Huawei for its provision of equipment in Iran, North Korea, Syria, and Venezuela. The U.S. inquiry stems from an earlier sanctions-violation probe that ultimately led to penalties against ZTE.

On 1 December 2018, Huawei vice-chairwoman and CFO Meng Wanzhou, daughter of company founder Ren Zhengfei, was arrested in Canada at the request of U.S. authorities. She faces extradition to the United States on charges of violating sanctions against Iran. 22 August 2018 arrest warrant was issued by the U.S. District Court for the Eastern District of New York. Meng is "charged with conspiracy to defraud multiple international institutions", according to the prosecutor. The warrant was based on allegations of a conspiracy to defraud banks which were clearing money that was claimed to be for Huawei, but was actually for Skycom, an entity claimed to be entirely controlled by Huawei, which was said to be dealing in Iran, contrary to sanctions. None of the allegations have been proven in court. On 11 December 2018, Meng Wanzhou was released on bail.

On 28 January 2019, U.S. federal prosecutors formally indicted Meng Wanzhou and Huawei with thirteen counts of bank and wire fraud, obstruction of justice, and misappropriating trade secrets. The department also filed a formal extradition request for Meng with Canadian authorities that same day. Huawei responded to the charges and that it "denies that it or its subsidiary or affiliate have committed any of the asserted violations", as well as asserted Meng was similarly innocent. The China Ministry of Industry and Information Technology believed the charges brought on by the United States were "unfair".

In May 2019, Chinese authorities arrested Canadian former diplomat Michael Kovrig and consultant Michael Spavor on charges of espionage. This was widely seen as a retaliatory move from the Chinese authorities, and other subsequent arrests were also questioned. These arrests have been viewed as hostage diplomacy, as has the subsequent arrest of Australian Yang Hengjun.

In November 2019, Huawei announced that it will pay RMB2 billion (US$286 million) in bonuses to its staff, and double their October salaries, as a reward for their efforts to counter the effect of recent U.S. trade sanctions on their supply chain.

"Canada is not the only one grappling with the Gordian knot of national security, global alliance and competitive market issues that Huawei represents," wrote the Financial Post in December 2019, noting that Australia and New Zealand have banned Huawei equipment, Britain is weighing its options, and the situation in the United States is "complicated".

On 27 May 2020, Meng lost her bid for freedom in the B.C. Supreme Court of Heather Holmes. She remained held in Vancouver on the extradition matter while her file was processed. The B.C. Supreme Court judge ruling that extradition proceedings against the Huawei executive should proceed, denying the claim of double criminality brought by Meng's defense team. It was noted that Meng could appeal to the Supreme Court of Canada and then finally to the Minister of Justice.

In June 2020, it came to light that more paper trail existed between Meng and Skycom, the Iranian importer of sanctioned U.S. technology. The paper trail purported to show how Meng attempted to insulate Huawei and herself by fig-leaf from clearly violating the sanctions regime. The charges against Meng include that she met the deputy head at HSBC of global banking for the Asia-Pacific region and that she made "numerous misrepresentations regarding Huawei's ownership and control of Skycom."

On 24 September 2021, the Department of Justice announced it had suspended its charges against Meng Wanzhou after she entered into a deferred prosecution agreement with them in which she conceded she helped misrepresent the relationship between Huawei and its subsidiary Skycom to HSBC in order to transact business with Iran, but did not have to plead guilty to the fraud charges. The Department of Justice will move to withdraw all the charges against Meng when the deferral period ends on 21 December 2022, on the condition that she is not charged with a crime before then.

=== Iraq ===
According to a report by Iraqi officials Huawei supplied "optic fibre and switching equipment" to the Iraqi military in 2001–2002 during the Ba'athist period when the country was ruled by Saddam Hussein, this was in violation of sanctions imposed by the United Nation on Iraq in 1991. Huawei denied the claims.

=== Syria ===
In 2019, Reuters reported that Huawei was linked to a suspicious front company in Mauritius which has conducted operations in Syria - despite Huawei's claim that they are unrelated.

=== Taliban ===
See #Taliban_2 section.

=== North Korea ===
In 2019, The Washington Post reported that Huawei was linked to a suspicious Chinese state-owned firm which has conducted operations in North Korea.

== Link to surveillance program ==
=== China ===
Huawei have been reported as one of the key suppliers for China's Great Firewall of China internet censorship program. Huawei is also reported to have worked closely with the Chinese Communist Party to enable surveillance of Uyghurs in Xinjiang. In 2018, Huawei signed an agreement with the Xinjiang public security bureau for the creation of an "intelligent security industry" hub. In January 2021, it was reported that Huawei previously filed a patent with the China National Intellectual Property Administration for a technology to identify Uyghur pedestrians.

=== Iran ===
In October 2011, The Wall Street Journal reported that Huawei had become Iran's leading provider of telecommunications equipment, including monitoring technologies that could be used for surveillance. Huawei responded with a statement claiming the story misrepresented the company's involvement: "We have never been involved and do not provide any services relating to monitoring or filtering technologies and equipment anywhere in the world".

=== Russia ===
According to report, Russian telecom equipment manufacturer Bulat was in talk with Huawei to acquire technology to store user data when they are using the network.

=== Taliban ===
In 2001, it was alleged that Huawei Technologies India had developed telecommunications surveillance equipment for the Taliban in Afghanistan, and newspapers reported that the Indian government had launched a probe into the firm's operations. Huawei responded, stating that the company did not have "any link with the Taliban", as its only customers are telecommunications carriers and its facilities "always operate according to U.N. rules and the local laws of each country". On 15 December 2001, the Indian authorities announced that they had not found any evidence that Huawei India had any connection to the Taliban, although the U.S. remains suspicious.

== Misleading marketing ==
=== Benchmark cheating ===
In September 2018, AnandTech reported that recent Huawei and Honor phones, including the Huawei P20 and Honor Play, had been configured to activate a high-performance mode when certain benchmarking software was detected, causing increased frame rates at the expense of efficiency and battery life. A Huawei executive admitted that the company was attempting to compete with domestic vendors, including one it accused of providing "unrealistic" scores. However, he also expressed an opinion that manufacturers should evaluate their phones on benchmarks that more accurately reflect real-world use, and that the company would vet its benchmark scores via third-parties before publishing them as promotional material.

After confirming the behavior with a version of its software that could not be easily detected, 3DMark delisted scores for several Huawei and Honor devices from its database. Huawei subsequently announced that it would add a "Performance Mode" feature to its EMUI 9 software, allowing users to enable this state on-demand to improve performance of apps such as games.

=== Cameras ===
On several occasions, Huawei has issued promotional materials promoting the camera capabilities on its smartphones, that were later found to have actually used professional DSLR cameras instead. In 2015, Huawei posted a promotional photo on Google+ featuring Ella Woodward bathed in a sunrise, asking readers to share their own photos of the sunrise taken with the Huawei P9—as aided by its low-light capabilities. It was pointed out that Exif metadata on the photo identified it as having been taken with a Canon EOS 5D Mark III, and the wording and intent of the post could potentially mislead readers into believing that the photo itself was also taken with a P9. Huawei pulled the post and apologized, stating that it was meant to "inspire our community", and that the caption should have been more clear.

In 2018, behind-the-scenes photos from the filming of a Nova 3 commercial by Huawei's Egyptian branch revealed that a DSLR had been used for certain scenes, implied to have been taken with the phone itself during the commercial. An actor was seen miming the taking of a selfie, without actually having a phone in his hand. It is not explicitly disclaimed in the ad.

In its promotion of the Huawei P30, the company was caught using stock photos on promotional posts for the device on Sina Weibo. The posts were later amended with fine print stating that they were for "reference" purposes only.

A new AI mode on the P30 is designed for taking photos of the moon, and states that it can "adequately capture the beauty of the moon along with fine details like moonbeams and shadows". However, it was later discovered that this mode merely composes existing imagery of the moon into the photo.

== National politics ==
=== China ===
==== Huawei Mate 10 Islamic feature dispute ====
In November 2017, Chinese users discovered the Salah (Islamic prayer) notification feature in Huawei Mate 10 phone, on the company's website for mainland China. It was viewed as an unjustified promotion of Islam given that Muslims are a minority religious group in mainland China that make up only about 1–2% of the population. Significant backlash has formed on the Chinese internet and some have even tried to boycott Huawei phones for including such feature, and make fun of the phone by calling it "the first phone with a Halal prayer feature" and describe the event as the "Islamic conversion of Huawei".

Later, Huawei published an official statement via Sina Weibo, stating that the feature was only a personalized notification service designed for "certain overseas regions" that was not available in China. Netizens questioned why promotion of that feature was available on the company's Chinese website in the first place if that was not the intended area but those comments were deleted before getting any response. A Taoist priest commented that the mosque-finding service on the device was also available in mainland China, inconsistent with the official explanation about these religious features. After Huawei published the official statement, many news reports and discussions made on Chinese online media or Chinese discussion platforms were made inaccessible or removed from the internet.

==== Chou Tzu-yu Republic of China flag incident ====
In January 2016, people found out that Chou Tzu-yu, a Taiwanese artist performing in South Korea and endorsed the Huawei Y6 in advertisement beforehand, was displaying the flag of Republic of China in a Korean entertainment show and accused the artist's behavior as supporting Taiwanese independence. As a response to the discovery, Huawei announced on the official forum that the arrangement was decided by their South Korean carrier partner LG U+ and they have already told LG U+ to terminate their cooperation with Chou Tzu-yu and her agency company. However LG U+ rejected the statement and claim their contract with the artist are still valid despite disputes. Chinese netizens have called for boycotting Huawei phones as a form of protest.

==== P-series phones listing Taiwan as a separate country ====
In August 2019 Chinese netizens criticized Huawei because their P-series phones listed Taiwan as a separate country when set to use traditional Chinese characters. Chinese netizens called for a boycott of Huawei using the Weibo hashtag #HuaweiGetoutofChina (华为滚出中国) and accused the company of supporting separatism.

== See also ==
- Communications security
- Information security
- Secure communication
