= Infrastructure policy of Donald Trump =

During his first term in office as President of the United States, the infrastructure policy of Donald Trump included promoting fossil fuel production and exports, safeguarding the cybersecurity of the national power grid and other critical infrastructure, locking China out of the U.S. fifth-generation Internet market, and rolling back regulations to ease the process of planning and construction. While there were no major infrastructure spending packages, some individual policies and projects were advanced piecemeal, especially in rural areas.

During his first presidential campaign, Trump touted a potential major infrastructure initiative. Although both sides of the political aisle recognized the need to upgrade American hard infrastructure, no major infrastructure bill was passed due to disagreements over the details of such a spending package, namely, what to spend on, how much to spend, and how to pay for it. In general, the aim of the Trump administration was to revitalize the national economy and enhance national security, despite the tendency of the Republican Party to oppose large federal expenditures and tax hikes. In contrast, members of the Democratic Party typically favored investing in renewable energy and new infrastructure that could begin to combat climate change.

During his second term, President Trump seeks to throttle the development of renewable energy, to facilitate the growth of nuclear power, to expand the production of fossil fuels, and to curb spending on public transit.

== Views, vision, and standards ==
As early as May 2015, one month before launching his presidential campaign, Donald Trump expressed his desire to fix America's aging infrastructure, and make it "second to none". He expressed concern about the state of American infrastructure on multiple occasions, drawing comparisons with other countries. For example, he stated that American passenger trains were slow compared to those in China, and American airports were dirty and dilapidated compared to their counterparts in China, Saudi Arabia, and Qatar. He acknowledged that modernizing American infrastructure was going to be expensive but argued that in the end, such an investment would pay for itself. In this regard, his position is in line with that of the Democratic Party. President Barack Obama and Vice President Joe Biden had themselves been advocating for more federal infrastructure spending. Ultimately, he was unable to sign into law a major infrastructure spending bill during his first term in office.

On January 31, 2019, Trump issued an executive order encouraging the purchase of U.S.-made construction materials for public infrastructure projects, especially those that need funding from the federal government. This followed his 2017 "Buy American, Hire American" executive order restricting the hiring of foreign workers and tightening standards for federal acquisitions. As of February 2019, Canadian officials were negotiating an exemption for their country.

In August 2020, amid the COVID-19 pandemic, the Trump administration issued guidelines on what it considered to be "critical infrastructure workers." Such individuals include those in the communications, energy, transportation, and water management sectors.

== Environmental reviews of infrastructure projects ==
In April 2019, President Trump signed two executive orders intended to accelerate energy infrastructure projects. The first makes it harder for oil pipelines and other energy projects to be delayed due to environmental concerns. The second modernizes the approval process for projects crossing international borders. Speaking in front of union workers from the energy industry, the President stated that blocking energy projects "does not just hurt families and workers like you, it undermines our independence and national security".

In early January 2020, the Trump administration proposed revisions of the National Environmental Policy Act (NEPA) that would relax environmental regulations on infrastructure constructions in order to speed them up. Federal agencies would no longer have to take climate change into account when assessing major infrastructure projects and would have to complete their comprehensive environmental reviews in two years. Infrastructure projects that require federal permits but little federal funding are exempt from such reviews. Nor would new projects have to account for "cumulative" effects.

If the proposed revisions survived their legal challenges, environmental activists would no longer be able to halt pipeline construction by litigation, a key tool they have been using since the middle of the Obama administration. While there have been examples of bureaucracy being burdensome on building projects in the past, such a drastic change would likely invite even more lawsuits. After 60 days of public hearing, a final regulation can be expected, probably before the 2020 Presidential election. In July 2020, the President announced the changes at a UPS hub in Atlanta, Georgia. He chose this location specifically because the revisions will expedite the expansion of the Interstate 75, frequently used by truck drivers and often congested. Previously, the State of Georgia announced it would create two additional lanes just for commercial trucks, and in the Fall of 2019, before Trump announced his revisions, said it was shifting the date of completion to 2028.

In June 2020, the President signed an executive order providing federal agencies with the emergency power to fast-track infrastructure projects, including energy and highway construction, by overriding environmental regulations. The Departments of Agriculture, the Interior, and Defense were to accelerate projects on federal lands. The White House claimed this was to help the U.S. economy recover from the downturn due to the COVID-19 pandemic. In March, the Environmental Protection Agency invoked the pandemic to ease regulations of power and industrial plants.

== Funding efforts ==
=== 2017-19 ===
More infrastructure spending was Trump's most popular promise in his presidential campaign, with approval from two thirds of Americans. In his first speech as President-elect, Trump vowed to "begin the urgent task of rebuilding" the United States of America.

In his first week as President, Trump's staff compiled a list of what they perceived as the 50 most urgent infrastructure projects, costing $137.5 billion altogether, intended to be funded by private capital.

Trump presented an infrastructure plan to Congress in February 2018, with $200 billion in federal funding and projected it would result in $1.5 trillion of investments from the private sector. Democrats opposed this plan because of its emphasis on state and local funding and private investments. Lawmakers from both sides of the aisle also questioned where the money would come from. By September 2019, as signs of a possible recession appear over the horizon, Donald Trump could use, among other things, infrastructure spending to tackle the problem like his predecessors did, albeit at the cost of more public debt as tax hikes are generally unpopular. However, because interest rates are low, public debt is not as troublesome, especially if additional debt is used to finance investments that could boost growth, such as in infrastructure.

In his 2019 State of the Union address, Trump again called for investments in infrastructure, but offered very few specifics. Moreover, his vision made little headway because despite bipartisan agreement that American infrastructure is in a state of poor repair and needs upgrading, members of Congress have not been able to reach a consensus on how to pay for it. The problem of aging infrastructure cannot be addressed by the individual states because the costs are too high, meaning the federal government has to be involved. The federal tax on fuels, a major source of revenue for infrastructure spending, remains the same as it was in 1993, at $0.183 (~$0.00 in 2025) per gallon ($0.048 per liter). In addition, the Highway Trust Fund is losing its effectiveness thanks to improving energy efficiency and the arrival of alternative-fuel vehicles whose owners do not pay the gas tax. Although people who attended a meeting with Trump in February 2018 suggested that the President was open to the idea of raising the gas tax to $0.25 per gallon ($0.066 per liter), the White House downplayed possibilities of such a tax hike. According to the Chamber of Commerce, which backs the proposal, it would generate about $375 billion over ten years.

President Trump held a meeting with the top Democrats in Congress, Nancy Pelosi and Chuck Schumer, on April 30, 2019, but failed to strike a deal. He wanted Congress to first pass the United States–Mexico–Canada Agreement (USMCA), the newly negotiated version of the North American Free Trade Agreement (NAFTA), to stop investigating him, and to remove the threat of impeachment. He also wanted a package with automatic re-authorization of highway and transit funding rather than a broader plan with money for a variety of items from hospitals to broadband Internet.

=== 2020 ===
While Republicans have generally been skeptical of Democrats' proposals to finance massive infrastructure programs by debt, in late March 2020, as lawmakers ponder how to alleviate the severe economic downturn induced by the COVID-19 pandemic in the United States, they seem to have coalesced around the need to upgrade American infrastructure and create jobs. President Trump publicly endorsed this possible deal as the next phase of the federal response to the pandemic. Secretary of the Treasury Steven Mnuchin told CNBC the President would like to take advantage of low interest rates to finance this potential bill. The Democrats' infrastructure plan includes funds for passenger rail transportation – with money for Amtrak's stations and services –, ports and harbors, climate-change resiliency, greenhouse gas emissions reduction, and expanding access to broadband Internet. A different plan passed the Senate Environment and Public Works Committee unanimously in July 2019; it would allocate $287 billion over five years, $259 billion of which to maintain and repair roads and bridges. President Trump mentioned this second plan in his 2020 State of the Union Address.

Trump indicated he would like to go further than this Senate plan. In late March, he voiced his support for a potential "Phase 4" stimulus package worth two trillion dollars of infrastructure spending. He called it "Phase 4" because three previous stimulus bills aimed at mitigating the effects of the pandemic. Earlier in the year, Secretary of the Treasury Steven Mnuchin discussed a possible infrastructure plans with House Ways and Means Committee Chairman Richard E. Neal, but their talks were derailed as the pandemic continued to spread across the United States. In order for such a spending package to be passed, lawmakers from across the political spectrum would need to be able to overcome long-standing disputes over what to spend on, how much money to spend, and where the money comes from, because the term 'infrastructure' is quite broad and means different things specifically to different people. Senate Majority Leader Mitch McConnell and House Minority Leader Kevin McCarthy both expressed skepticism of the need for a fourth stimulus package in a row, saying they would like to wait and see the effects of the three packages already passed first.

== Disaster relief ==
In early June 2019, President Trump signed a disaster relief and recovery bill worth $19 billion (~$23.6 billion in 2025). The Additional Supplemental Appropriations for Disaster Relief Act of 2019 includes $3 billion (~$3.72 billion in 2025) for the U.S. Army Corps of Engineers to repair damages inflicted by natural disasters in the previous three years and to invest in resiliency and flood protection, unlocks $8.9 billion in disaster relief for Puerto Rico and offers an additional $900 million to help the territory recover from Hurricane Maria. This bill also provides additional resources to the U.S. Forest Service for wildfire suppression activities. Some $1.6 billion is allocated to repairing roads and bridges post-disaster through the Federal Highway Administration's Emergency Relief Fund.

The Act also provides financial assistance to the U.S. Marine Corps base Camp Lejeune in North Carolina, which sustained $3 billion worth of damages by Hurricane Florence.

In early July 2020, President Trump approved federal aid going to Missouri after the state was battered by severe storms in early May. Preliminary estimates suggest repairing all the infrastructure damage could cost $9.3 million. Missouri Governor Mike Parson said federal money would fund the repairs and replacements of electrical power equipment, roads, bridges, and other public works.

== Energy ==
=== Electrical power grid ===
In late June 2017, about a week after cybersecurity experts realized that a piece of malware used to attack Ukraine's power grid the previous year could, with modifications, be used against the United States, President Trump met with cabinet officials, leaders from the energy sector, cybersecurity experts to discuss the threat. The federal government identifies energy infrastructure, mostly owned and operated by the private sector, as critical, and the Department of Homeland Security cooperates with the private sector to ensure its security. Using an executive order issued in May 2017, President Trump ordered, among other things, an investigation on America's preparedness against a cyber attack resulting in prolonged power outages.

In late April 2020, President Trump signed an executive order aimed at protecting the U.S. national power grid against foreign cyber attacks. "A successful attack on our bulk-power system would present significant risks to our economy, human health and safety, and would render the United States less capable of acting in defense of itself and its allies," he wrote. This executive order bans the purchase and installation of equipment manufactured outside the United States. In addition, it tasks the Secretary of Energy, Dan Brouillette at the time of its issuing, with creating a list of safe vendors, identifying any vulnerable components of the grid and replacing them. In 2018, then Secretary of Energy Rick Perry created the Office of Cybersecurity, Energy Security, and Emergency Response (CESER) to combat cybersecurity threats to the U.S. power supply. While the U.S. has not witnessed any destructive cyber attacks on its power grid yet, foreign actors have conducted reconnaissance operations on this infrastructure. In January 2020, the FBI notified grid operators about the vulnerabilities in their software supply chain.

=== Energy independence ===
President Donald Trump's position with regards to energy independence is similar to that of his predecessors dating back to the 1970s. His Energy Secretary, Rick Perry, argued that "An energy dominant America means self-reliant. It means a secure nation, free from the geopolitical turmoil of other nations who seek to use energy as an economic weapon."

=== Fossil fuels ===
Shortly after taking office in 2017, President Donald Trump announced the U.S. was withdrawing from the 2015 Paris Climate Agreement, thereby fulfilling a campaign promise. He said he wanted a "fair" deal that would not undermine American workers and businesses, or compromise American national sovereignty. President Trump formally announced withdrawal of the United States from the Paris Agreement on June 1, 2017, in addition to rolling back other Obama-era environmental regulations such as the Clean Power Plan.

In January 2017, President Trump signed an executive order reviving the Dakota Access Pipeline, bringing oil from shale reserves in North Dakota to refineries in Illinois along a route 1,172 miles (1,887 km) long.

On February 14, 2017, Trump signed a bill that revoked a rule requiring oil, gas and mining firms to disclose how much they paid foreign governments.

In March 2017, the Trump administration approved the construction of the Keystone XL Pipeline, reversing a decision by the Obama administration and fulfilling a campaign promise.

In January 2018, the Interior Department announced plans to allow drilling in nearly all U.S. waters. This was the largest expansion of offshore oil and gas leasing ever proposed, and included regions that were long off-limits to development.

In late May 2019, the Department of Energy rebranded natural gas as "molecules of freedom" which it sought to export worldwide. The announcement was made during the expansion of a facility in Quintana Island, Texas, that produces liquefied natural gas. This expansion was expected to bring 3,000 jobs to the area. In general, there was no difference between the export policy of the Trump administration for liquefied natural gas and that of the Obama administration.

At an event in Salt Lake City, Utah, Energy Secretary Rick Perry announced that rather than imposing "draconian" regulations on the fossil fuel industry, the Trump administration was committed to making them cleaner. He said his administration wanted to develop ways to reduce emissions as demand for coal dropped and natural gas rose. Perry pointed to efforts underway to replace old and inefficient coal power plants and to use more liquefied natural gas. According to the Environmental Protection Agency (EPA), U.S. emissions fell by 13% between 2005 and 2017.

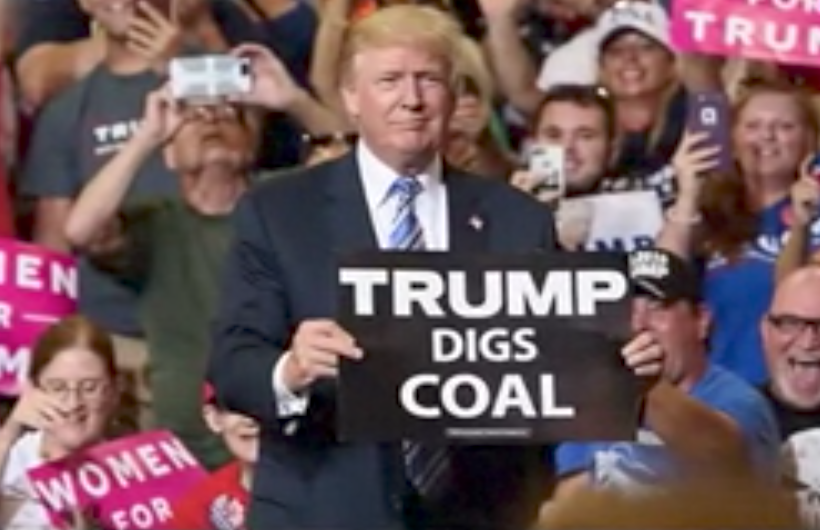
Donald Trump at a rally in Harrisburg, Pennsylvania, in 2017.

In June 2019, the Trump administration introduced a new rule on coal power plant emissions, requiring electric utilities to cut their emissions to 35% below 2005 levels by 2030. It authorized the creation of targets for improving efficiency by state regulators and did not require the switching from coal to other energy sources. This new rule replaced the Obama-era Clean Power Plan, which established specific carbon-emissions reduction target for each state. However, according to the International Energy Agency, the U.S. electricity sector needed to reduce its emissions by 74% below 2005 levels over the same period in order to prevent the global average temperature from rising by more than 2 °C. Nevertheless, utilities were already moving away from coal as the costs of alternatives had become increasingly competitive.

The Trump administration was selling leases in Alaska's Arctic National Wildlife Refuge to oil companies for drilling. Although environmentalists opposed the project on the grounds that it damaged the landscape and harmed the animals that migrated there, some native Alaskans living in the area supported the move. While infrastructure there was limited, residents received their paychecks from the oil industry drilling in Prudhoe Bay, which also paid for a full-time fire department and a basketball gym. They also had flush toilets, which do not exist in villages outside the Refuge. However, after a lease sale, an oil company would need to first drill some test wells to see if a significant amount of oil in the area could be found, and if there was, then environmental reviews and permits would be needed before extraction could proceed.

Cheap and abundant energy has fueled the revival of American manufacturing. However, steel tariffs from the Trump administration's trade war with China also increased the cost of pipeline construction and other equipment.

Trump oversaw the largest increase in oil production during a single presidential term even after the COVID-19 pandemic in the United States hit in mid 2020. Just before the pandemic, American oil production reached 13.2 million barrels a day, the highest in American history and an increase of nearly 4.1 million barrels from Trump's inaugural month.

During his second term, President Trump again withdrew the United States from the Paris climate agreement, and reversed many environmental regulations from the prior administration. Trump continues to promote fossil fuel production and exports. Between 2016 and 2025, American oil production grew 70 percent, making the United States one of the top producer and exporter in the world. America is also a leader in export of liquefied natural gas (LNG).

In late April 2026, President Trump approved the Bridger Pipeline, carrying crude oil from the border with Canada to Wyoming.

=== Nuclear energy ===
In 2017, President Trump announced his administration was launching a "complete review" of ways to revive and expand the nuclear power industry. Energy Secretary Rick Perry also noted the importance increasing the use of nuclear energy, calling it "a very important part" of the Trump administration's energy strategy.

During his second term, President Trump signed into law the One Big Beautiful Bill Act in 2025, which offers tax credits to the nuclear industry. His administration also sought to reactivated dormant nuclear power plants to meet rising demand for electricity from manufacturing facilities and data centers for artificial intelligence.

=== Renewable energy ===
==== Background ====
The Trump administration prefers fossil fuels to renewable energy. In particular, Trump's enthusiastic support for the coal meant that his electoral victory in 2016 was widely celebrated by the coal mining community.

==== Hydro ====
In November 2017, the Northern Pass transmission line project, proposed by utilities company Eversource to carry hydroelectricity from Quebec to New England, received a presidential permit. For years, New England has been shedding its coal power plants, and the process continues under President Trump. However, in July 2019, the New Hampshire Supreme Court unanimously upheld the state's Site Evaluation Committee rejection, citing concerns over the land use, environmental and economic impacts of the 192-mile (307-km) transmission line.

In January 2018, President Trump said he would like the United States to harness more hydropower. However, it is not clear whether he would like to increase hydropower generation or he was unaware of how much hydroelectric dams contribute to the national grid. In any case, while the Energy Information Administration does not expect U.S. hydroelectricity generation to increase in the upcoming years, it is possible to upgrade the turbines of existing facilities as the average U.S. hydroelectric unit has been operating for 64 years. In addition, most dams in the U.S. are not for power generation, but can be fitted with turbines.

==== Solar ====
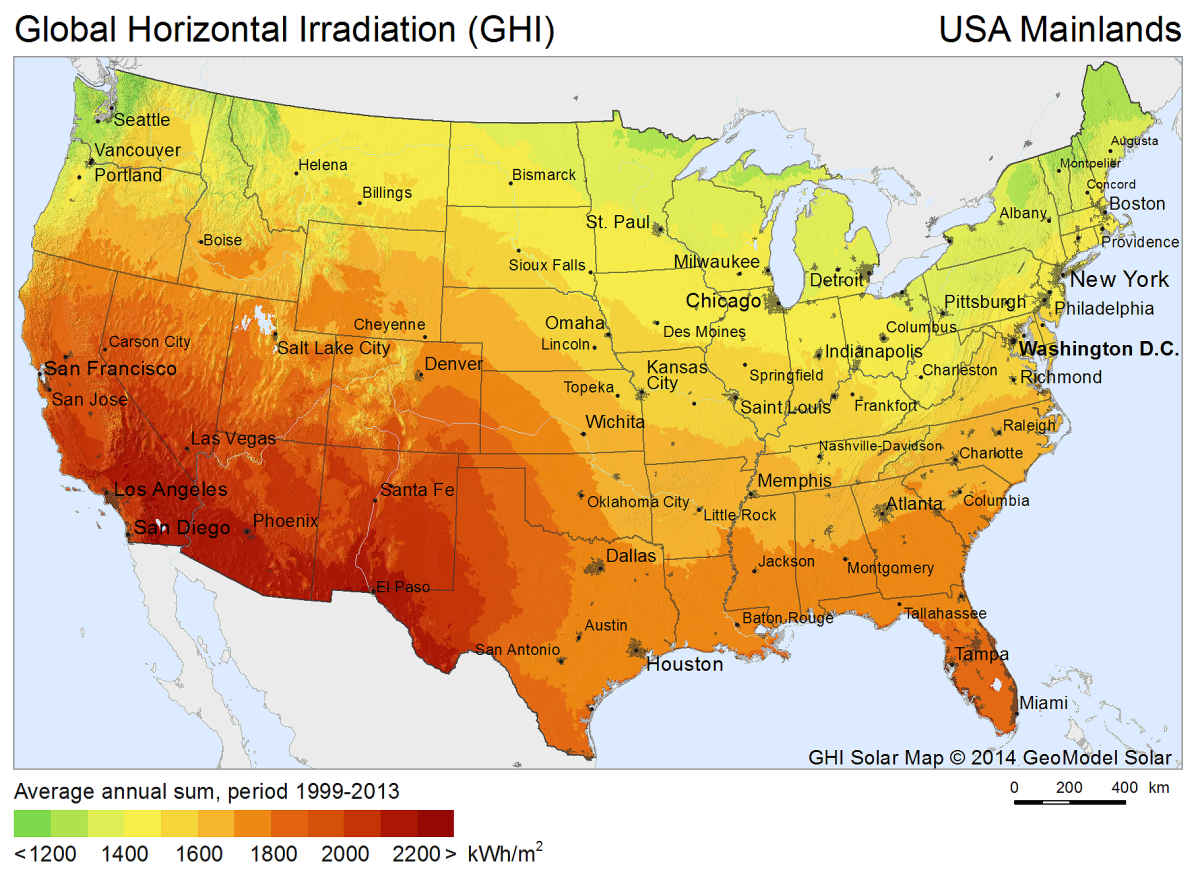
Solar irradiation map of the U.S. mainland in kWh/m^{2} in 2014.

Even though President Trump holds critical views of renewable energy in general and solar in particular, his appointees in the Department of the Interior have been facilitating the development of multiple renewable energy projects in public lands. In May 2020, the Trump administration gave final approval to the Gemini Solar Farm project in Nevada. Worth a billion dollars, it includes 690 MW of power-generating capacity and 380 MW of four-hour lithium-ion batteries. It is enough to power 260,000 households and offset the greenhouse-gas emissions of 86,000 cars. Secretary of the Interior David Bernhardt said it would also create 2,000 jobs, directly and indirectly, and pump $712.5 million into the economy. Gemini, scheduled to enter service by the end of 2023, is the largest solar farm project ever approved in the United States and one of the largest in the world. Opponents argued that the project puts a number of endangered species, such as the Mojave desert tortoise, at risk. Previously, two solar farms on public lands were approved: the Sweetwater Project (80 MW) in Wyoming and the Palen Project (500 MW) in California.

In 2018, as part of the ongoing trade war between the U.S. and China, Trump imposed tariffs on imported solar cells. The push for tariffs to protect American manufacturing and jobs in the solar power industry began in April 2017, when a bankrupt Georgia-based solar cell maker filed a trade complaint that a flood of cheap imports put them at a severe disadvantage. In response, the President imposed 30% tariffs of solar imports in January 2018. The solar industry is currently one of the fastest growing in the United States, employing more than 250,000 people as of 2018. On one hand, these tariffs forced the cancellation or scaling down of many projects and restrict the ability of companies to recruit more workers. On the other hand, they have the intended effect of incentivizing domestic manufacturing. Many solar power companies are transitioning toward automation and consequently will become less dependent on imports, especially from China. Analysts believe Trump's tariffs have made a clear impact. Without them, the manufacturing capacity for solar cells in the United States would likely not have increased significantly, from 1.8 gigawatts in 2017 to at least 3.4 gigawatts in 2018, they argue. However, because of the increasing reliance on automation, not that many new jobs will be created, while profits will flow to other countries, as many firms are foreign. By 2019, the solar power industry has recovered from the initial setbacks due to Trump's tariffs, thanks to initiatives from various states, such as California. Moreover, it is receiving considerable support from the Department of Energy. The National Renewable Energy Laboratory (NREL) launched the American-made Solar Prize competition in June 2018 and has handed out tens to hundreds of thousands of dollars in cash prizes for the most promising solar cell designs. Prices of solar cells continue to decline. At the same time, the cost of installation has fallen by 70% between 2009 and 2019. Solar power can now go head to head against even natural gas. (A federal tax credit from 2006 has also been helpful.) Thanks to economic forces, the United States is now the second largest market for solar power, after China, and utility-scale projects are booming across the American Southeast.

==== Wind ====
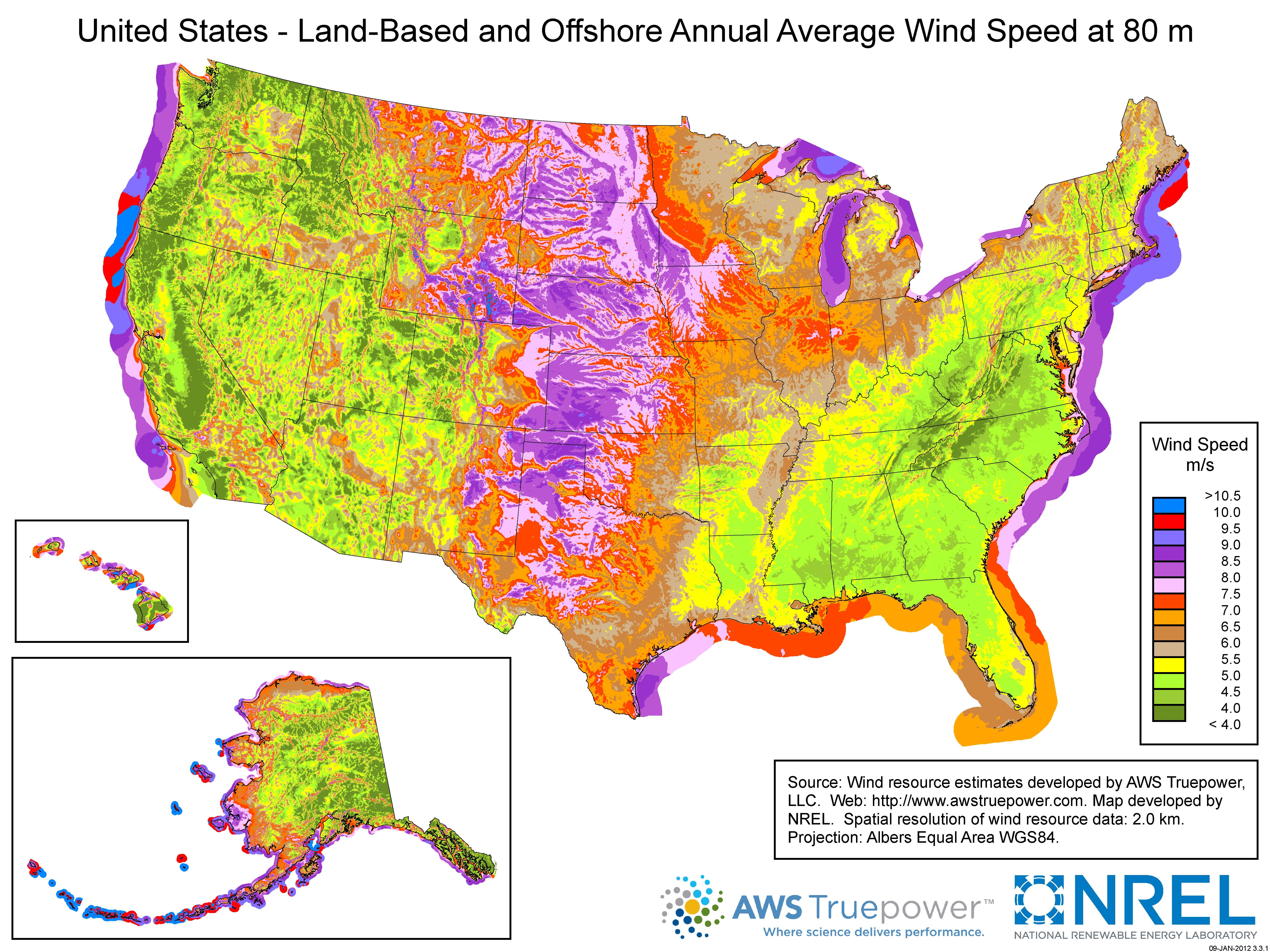
Map of average annual wind speed in m/s at 80 m in the U.S. both on and offshore (NREL). Blue, red and purple mean more; yellow and green mean less.

Despite Trump's fondness for coal, his administration was not entirely hostile to renewable energy. Interior Secretary Ryan Zinke wrote in an op-ed for the Boston Globe that he wanted to provide "an equal opportunity for all sources of responsible energy development, from fossil fuels to the full range of renewables." He added that "wind energy—particularly offshore wind—will play a greater role in sustaining American energy dominance." Zinke wanted to assist developers by allowing them to postpone decisions on detailed designs during the planning process so that they could take advantage of newer technologies.

During his second term, however, President Trump signed executive orders that froze federal permits and loans for both offshore and onshore wind farms. He also ended the leasing of federal lands and waters to wind power projects.

== Federal public buildings ==
In February 2020, President Trump proposed an executive order mandating "classical" architecture—including Gothic, Romanesque, Spanish, Mediterranean and other traditional styles—for all federal public buildings in the District of Columbia. Trump, the National Civic Art Society, a driving force behind the proposed executive order, and Utah Senator Mike Lee hold a dim view of more modern architectural styles, such as Brutalism, which proved popular during the 1950s but has largely fallen out of favor. These styles have been used in most federal buildings from the 1950s onward. However, the draft executive order singled out the Federal Courthouse in Tuscaloosa, Alabama, completed in 2011, for praise. On the other hand, the American Institute of Architects opposed it. Although they agreed that classical styles are "beautiful", they argued that modern building designs must take into account security, new technology, and efficiency. He signed Executive Order on Promoting Beautiful Federal Civic Architecture in December 2020 that would only apply to federal courthouses, agency headquarters, and other government buildings in the National Capital Region, plus any other federal buildings costing more than $50 million in 2020 values. President Joe Biden repealed it in February 2021.

== Telecommunications ==
=== Cybersecurity of critical infrastructure ===
In May 2017, President Trump signed an executive order urging federal agencies to upgrade their antiquated information technology (IT) infrastructure, to draw up plans for coordinated defense, and to comply with cybersecurity standards introduced by the National Institute of Standards and Technology (NIST). The order also tackles workforce training in order to provide the United States with a "long-term cybersecurity advantage." For his administration, cybersecurity is a priority because a cyber attack on critical infrastructure could inflict "catastrophic regional or national effects on public health or safety, economic security, or national security." Addressing cybersecurity was a 2016 campaign promise from Trump. However, given that three quarters of the federal budget for IT goes to the operating and maintaining legacy systems, additional funding might be necessary.

=== High-speed Internet ===
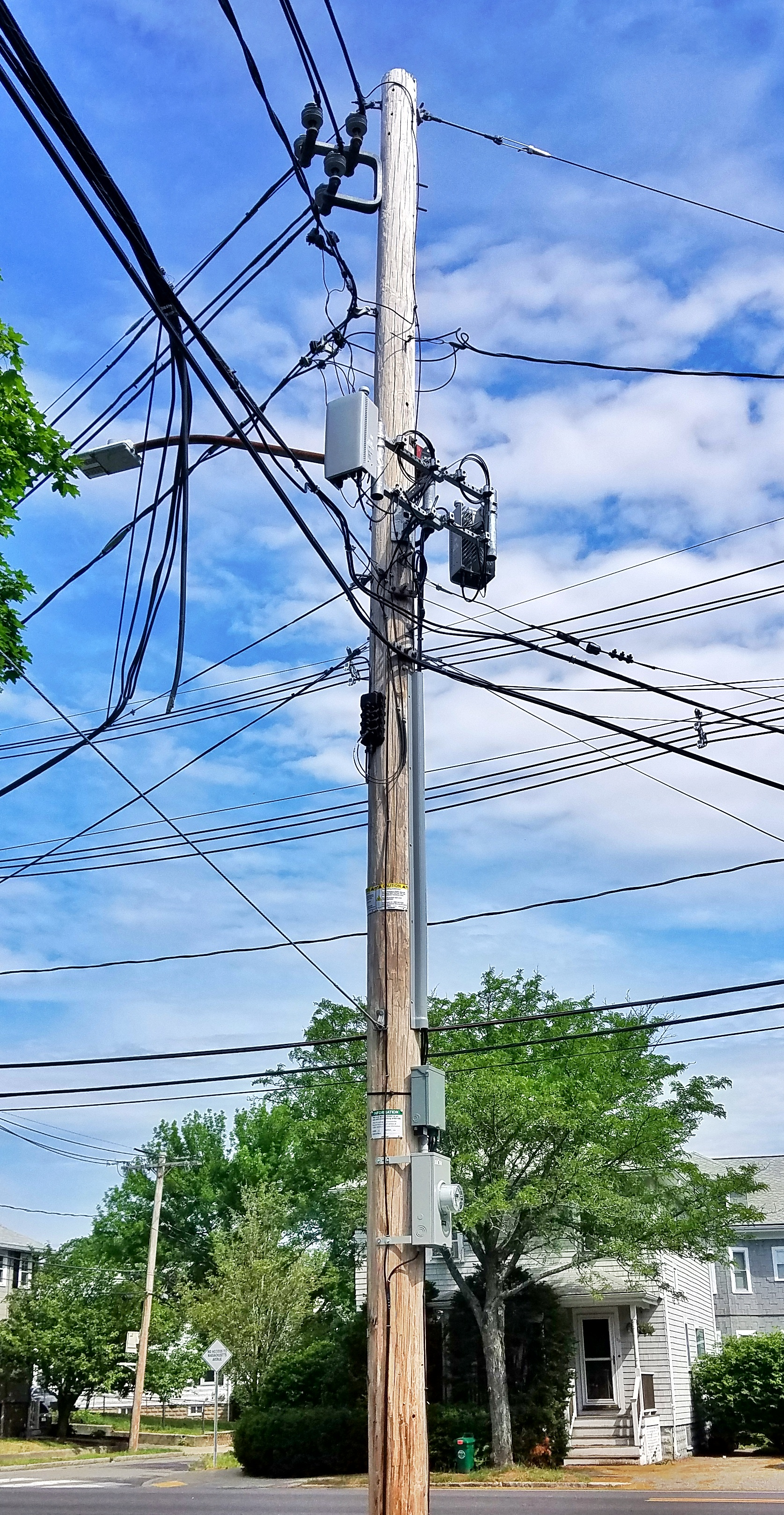
Utility pole with Verizon 5G millimeter-wave antennas, Arlington, Massachusetts (2021)

After thinking for a year, President Donald Trump came out against having nationalized fifth-generation wireless internet infrastructure (5G). Federal Communications Commission (FCC) Chairman Ajit Pai said this sent an "important signal" to private companies that were investing billions of dollars in 5G. Pai also proposed spending $20.4 billion over a decade on rural broadband Internet services. Since November 2018, the FCC has been auctioning megahertz of spectrum to commercial wireless internet service providers offering 5G connectivity. FCC Commissioner Jessica Rosenworcel said this was a step in the right direction and suggested that the Commission should not leave out "mid-band" spectrum lest the U.S. falls behind other countries. While previous generations of wireless internet offer the ability to send texts, static images, voice, and video through the Internet, 5G is considerably faster, allowing for high-quality video streaming, driverless cars, automated ports, remotely-controlled industrial robots, among other things. South Korea and the United States won the global 5G race when they began rolling out their services in early April 2019. Verizon Communications Inc, AT&T Corp, Sprint Corp, and T Mobile US Inc have already begun implementing 5G equipment in a number of American cities with plans to gradually expand service as 5G-compatible phones become more widely available. However, a combination of the high capital costs and high debt levels of leading U.S. telecommunications firm could result in a slow deployment of 5G networks, allowing subsidized Chinese equipment to penetrate markets in Asia and Europe.

President Trump made the above announcement as he was considering banning Chinese telecommunications giant Huawei from the U.S. market. His administration had already been discouraging U.S. allies from purchasing Huawei's 5G technology out of security concerns. His administration believed that Huawei equipment puts intelligence sharing at risk. Since March 2018, the FCC has considered barring the use of federal funds to purchase equipment from companies that could pose a threat to national security. By law, companies operating on Chinese soil must "support, cooperate with and collaborate in national intelligence work."

Founded in 1987, Huawei has since become a leading telecommunications firm, spending 14% of its revenue on research and development each year between 2016 and 2018. However, it has been mired in multiple controversies involving alleged intellectual property theft and espionage. After an 11-month investigation, the U.S. House Intelligence Committee found in 2012 that Huawei and ZTE, another Chinese firm, were threats to national security and recommended that U.S. companies refrain from doing business with them. Under Donald Trump, the U.S. government has been trying to dissuade companies and other governments from around the world from using Huawei's technologies. In May 2019, the Trump administration added Huawei to the "entity list", which prevents it from acquiring technology from American firms without approval from the U.S. government. In October 2019, President Trump met with his Finnish counterpart, Sauli Niinisto, to discuss alternatives to 5G technology from Huawei. Finland's technology giant Nokia has developed some 5G capabilities of its own, and is one of Huawei's chief competitors, alongside Sweden's Ericsson. In December 2017, telecommunications firms from around the world agreed upon a set of global standards for 5G so that the technology can be easily implemented. The race was on for the various equipment manufacturers for global dominance, including Huawei and ZTE from China, Nokia, Ericsson, Qualcomm and Intel (both from the U.S.). 5G is a key part of the geopolitical fault lines created by Donald Trump's desire to "make America great again" and China's stated goal of becoming a global hegemony in artificial intelligence by 2030; this technological race is a part of the U.S.-China trade war.

In June 2020, the Trump administration formally announced its opposition to the construction of a new undersea Internet cable connecting Hong Kong with the United States, citing national security concerns. U.S. government officials worried that such a connection would allow Chinese intelligence direct access to U.S. data, boosting their capabilities at a time when China is making no secret of its global ambitions. Adam Hickey, a senior official from the Department of Justice on telecommunications, told Politico, "It has the potential to establish Hong Kong as the center of gravity for U.S. data connectivity in Asia, offering unprecedented opportunities for collection by the Chinese intelligence services." While it is ultimately the FCC that will decide whether to approve the project, it frequently defers to an inter-governmental agency called Team Telecom. In a report, Team Telecom officials wrote, "By combining personnel data with travel records, health records and credit information, [China’s] intelligence services may have the capability to create in just a few years a database more detailed than any nation has ever possessed about one of its rivals." According to Google, the Hong Kong-U.S. data link will be 12,800 km (8,000 miles) long and will be able to accommodate 80 million teleconference calls between Hong Kong and Los Angeles. It is part of the wider Pacific Light Cable Network project—backed by Google itself, Facebook, and other companies. Pacific Light also has portions connecting the U.S. with Taiwan and the Philippines, both of which received the green light from Team Telecom. This development occurs in the backdrop of deteriorating Sino-American trade relations, with President Trump vocally criticizing China for unfair trade practices and intellectual property theft, China's imposition of a new national security law in Hong Kong, viewed by the U.S. as a threat to the Special Administrative Region's autonomy, and the COVID-19 global pandemic, which began in China and has fueled anti-Chinese sentiments among the American public.

=== Telehealth ===
In late March 2020, President Trump signed into law a stimulus package worth around two trillion dollars, the biggest in American history, in order to alleviate the economic downturn due to the COVID-19 pandemic in the United States. Besides cash infusion for front-line hospitals, loans for struggling industries, aid for farmers, enhanced unemployment benefits, relief for married couples with young children, and tax cuts for retailers, it included $200 million for telemedicine. This would help doctors examine their patients remotely, using video-conferencing technology. At present, the FCC operates a rural healthcare program that subsidizes the use of telecommunications technology. FCC Chairman Ajit Pai personally requested this aid in early March. Early that month, the President signed a bipartisan bill that extended Medicare coverage to include telemedicine in outbreak areas. Previously, it was restricted to rural residents who had to take long trips to see a doctor. Telemedicine reduces the need for travel, and therefore chances of vulnerable senior citizens catching COVID-19.

== Transportation ==
In early February 2025, during President Trump's second term in office, his Secretary of Transportation, Sean Duffy, circulated a memo instructing his Department to prioritize funding for counties with marriage and birth rates higher than the national average.

=== Canals, ports, and harbors ===
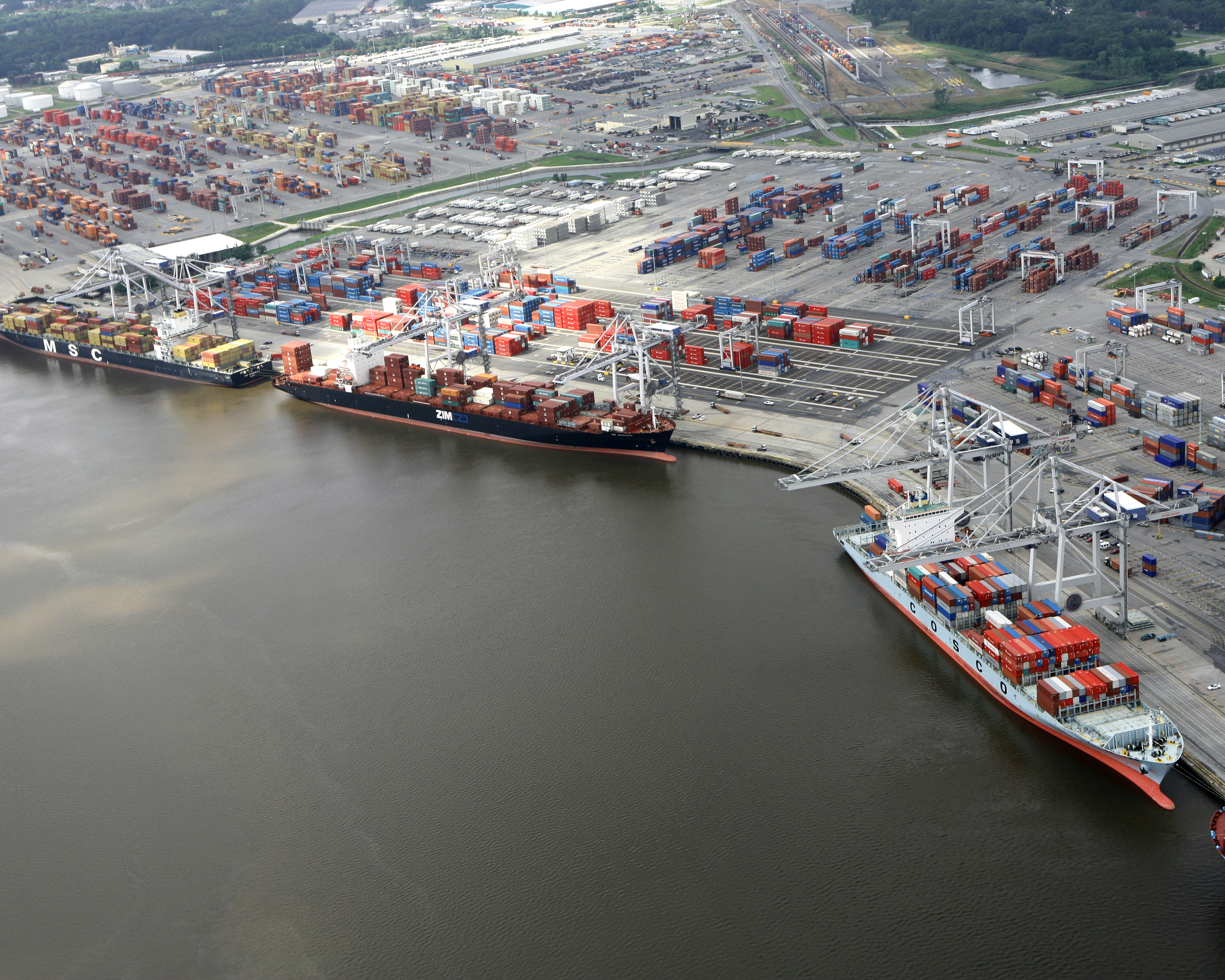
Port of Savannah with intermodal yard at the top (February 2016)

Charleston Harbor, South Carolina, regularly hosts ships traveling through the recently expanded Panama Canal. South Carolina is also home to many manufacturing plants belonging to various multinational corporations, such as the automaker BMW, the tire maker Michelin, and many others. Works to deepen it to 52 feet (15.8 m) has been ongoing since 2011 but had never been on a federal budget proposed by the President till 2018, when a new cost-benefit analysis conducted by the U.S. Army Corps of Engineers made it suitable for consideration. President Trump allocated $138 million (~$171 million in 2025) to the project in his budget in 2019. Dredging started in 2018, and the State Ports Authority, which operates Charleston Harbor, said it planned to complete the project by 2021, in time for a new container terminal to open. Upon completion, it will be the deepest shipping channel in the East Coast of the United States.

The America's Water Infrastructure Act, signed into law by President Trump in October 2018 authorizes $6 billion (~$7.57 billion in 2025) in spending. Potential recipients for federal funding include the Houston-Galveston Navigation Channel Extension ($15.6 million), and the Ala Wai Canal project in Hawaii ($306.5 million). This bill includes a five-year "Buy American" provision, which requires the use of American-made construction materials used by projects funded by the Act.

The Port of Savannah, Georgia, is a busy shipping channel and the fourth largest in the United States. Worth almost a billion dollars, work has been underway since 2016 to deepen the harbor from 42 feet (12.8 m) to 47 feet (14.3 m) in order to accommodate heavier cargo ships taking advantage of the expanded Panama Canal to travel to and from the Eastern United States. At present, such ships are already visiting the Port, but they cannot carry their full loads at low tide. Cargo volumes to the Port of Savannah reached four million containers in 2017. If work goes one as scheduled, the deepening project is expected to be largely finished in 2022. As of 2020, the State of Georgia has already committed $300 million (~$367 million in 2025) to the project, but federal funding is needed. Although President Trump's budget proposals are unlikely to make much headway in a divided Congress that must sign off federal spending packages, due to a ban on earmarks to prevent lawmakers from adding pet projects to federal budgets, anything supervised by the Army Corps of Engineers is usually funded at the level requested in budget proposals. In 2019, despite funding cuts to the Corps, the Port of Savannah received the full $130.3 million requested by Trump while In 2018, it received $186 million. For his 2020 federal budget proposal, President Trump requested $86 million (~$105 million in 2025) for the project.

=== Civil aviation ===
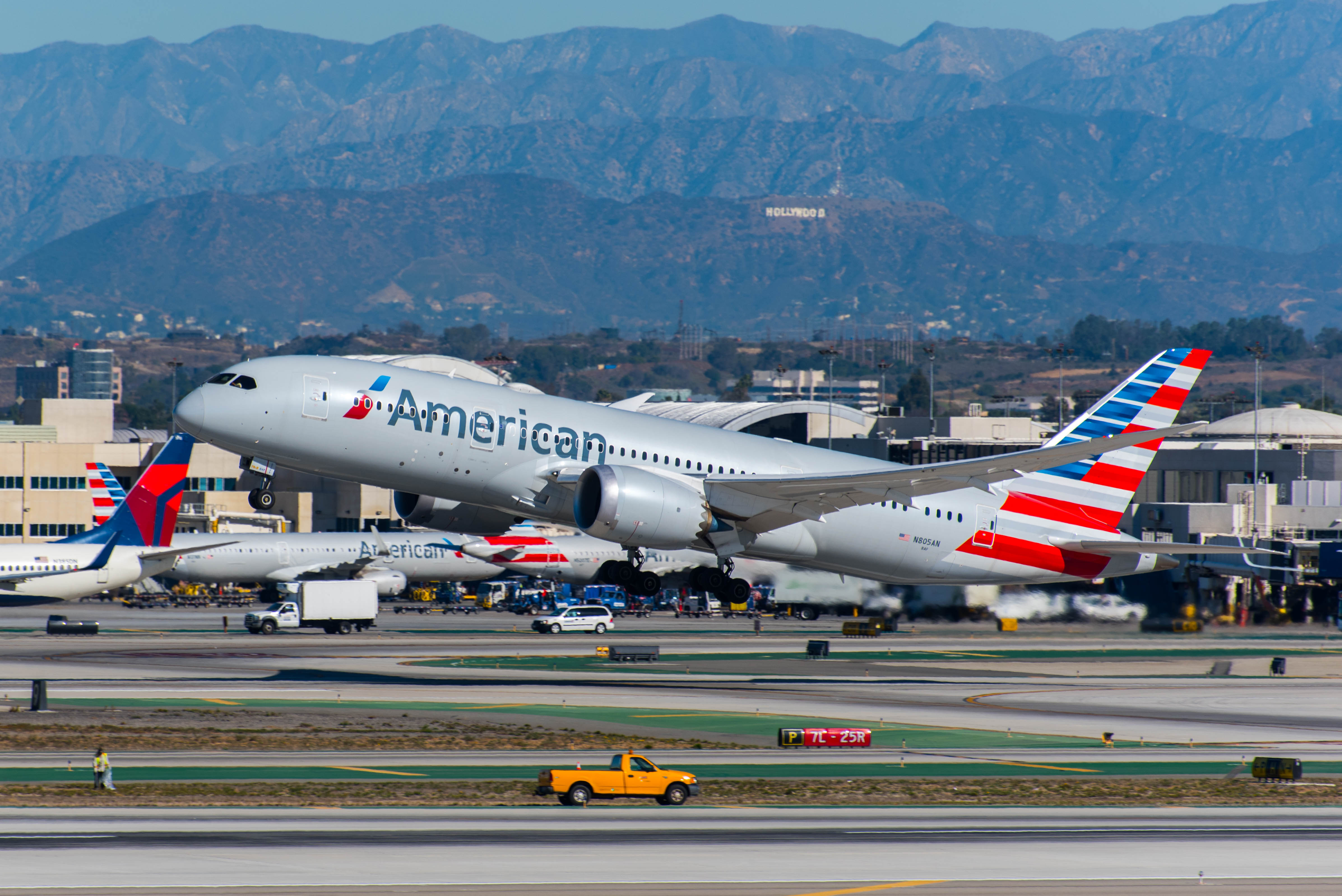
Some airlines are spending their own money on airport facilities. Pictured: An American Airlines Boeing 787-8 Dreamliner at LAX.

Shortly after taking office in 2017, Donald Trump unveiled an infrastructure plan worth a trillion dollars that includes a $2.4 (~$3.1 billion in 2025)-billion cut to federal transportation programs. This plan would eliminate subsidies for long-distance trains and commercial flights to rural communities with limited transportation options, including those that helped Trump win the presidency. He wanted to relieve the Federal Aviation Administration (FAA) of air traffic control and to turn it into a private nonprofit corporation.

In June 2019, the FAA announced it was giving out $840 million in grants for improving airport facilities and President Trump proposed $17.1 billion in funding for the FAA. Trump's proposal made it through the House Appropriations Committee with $614 million more than requested. Therefore, the FAA had $17.7 billion to spend. Airport Improvement Programs (AIP) funds will go to over 380 airports in 47 states. One of the biggest grants is worth $29 million, which goes to runway reconstruction at Ted Stevens Anchorage International Airport in Alaska. In addition, the House Appropriations Committee announced $3.3 billion in AIP grants to be handed out in 2020, plus $500 million for discretionary airport infrastructure spending.

Some airliners themselves have been financing airport capital projects on their own. For example, American Airlines and Delta have committed $1.6 billion and $1.8 billion, respectively, to modernize the facilities they use at the Los Angeles International Airport (LAX). Delta allocated another four billion dollars to the construction of a new terminal at the LaGuardia International Airport in New York City. At the same time, a number of airports are willing to spend money on their own facilities in order to reap the long-term economic benefits. In May 2019, the Dallas-Fort Worth International Airport (DFW) announced it would spend some $3.5 billion on a new terminal and on renovating an existing terminal for American Airlines, which uses the airport as one of its main hubs in the U.S.

In early 2020, American airports saw their passenger numbers plummet due to the COVID-19 global pandemic. To help them cope with the crisis, the Trump administration provided $10 billion in financial aid with Congressional approval.

=== Public transportation ===
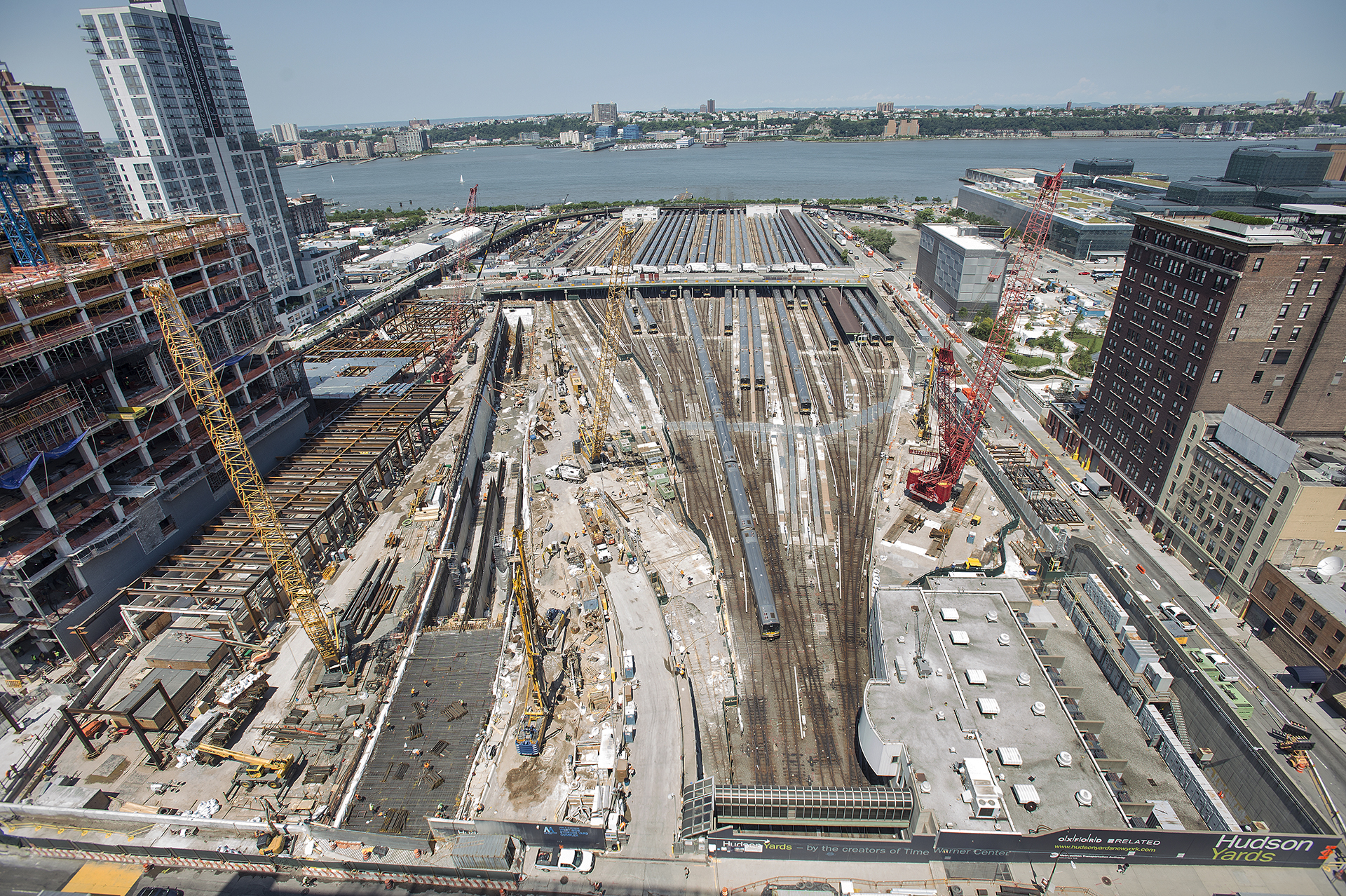
Construction at Hudson Yards, Manhattan, New York City.

In 2017, in its presidential budget proposal, the Trump administration suggested eliminating long-distance services by Amtrak, the national inter-city passenger rail company, due to its unprofitability. But this was rejected by Congress.

In 2018, the Trump administration rolled out an infrastructure plan that allocates one quarter of the money available to rural areas, even though only 14% of Americans live there. This spells trouble for numerous large-scale urban projects and undermines aging transit networks in large established cities such as Chicago or New York City, which need significant funds for repairs, maintenance, and modernization, because it favors new construction. (Note: This does not mean such cities have no need or plans for transit expansions. See, for example, the Chicago "L" Red Line Extension.)

The Gateway Program is a plan to modernize railroad infrastructure between New York and New Jersey and to double the number of trains passing between those two states. This plan includes repairs to the old North River Tunnels, and the construction of the new rail tunnel beneath the Hudson River.

Although he was initially in favor of the Gateway Project, Trump later turned against it and urged fellow Republicans to cut funding for it. Moreover, he dismissed the project as a local one that lacks national importance and a potential boondoggle. He subsequently cut money from the funds for the Gateway Program. While supporters of the Gateway Project argue that it is one of the nation's most pressing infrastructure needs, opponents are wary of additional federal spending and the fact that money will be taken away from smaller projects for their districts. Funding was subsequently restored to the "point of no return" by the Biden administration in 2024, with $12 billion allocated.

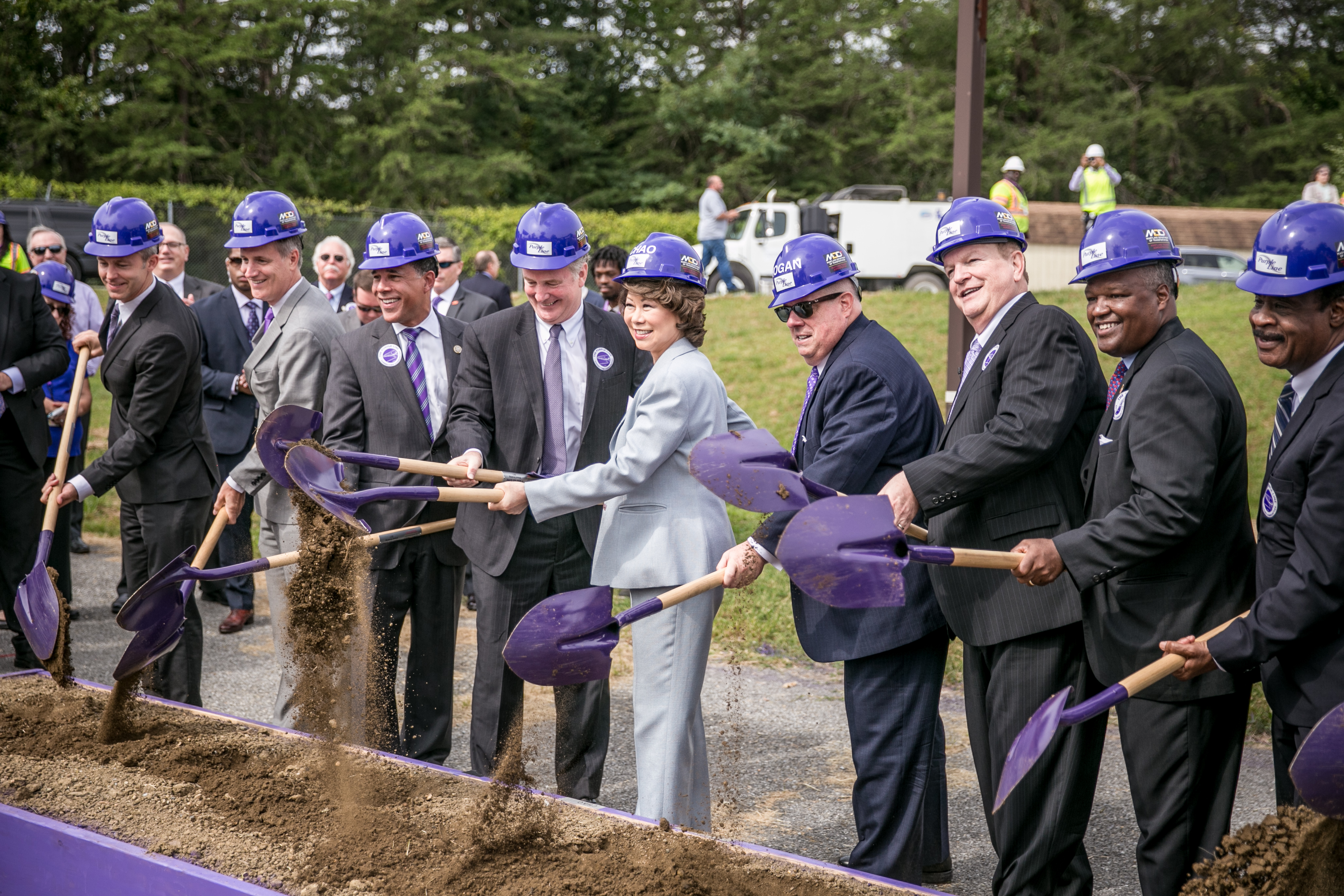
Groundbreaking ceremony for Maryland's Purple Line in August 2017.

Federal funding for smaller projects, such as $900 million for the Washington Metro's Purple Line, was approved. However, Trump's infrastructure spending plan stalled due to from Democrats who took issue with the fact that Trump preferred private funding and highways to federal funding and public transit. Of the projected $1.5 trillion, the federal government would spend only $200 billion. Under the Obama administration, funding for transit on one hand and for highways and bridges on the other hand were roughly equal. Under the Trump administration, some 70% of the funding would go to highways and bridges and only about 11% to transit.

In February 2019, Governor Gavin Newsom reduced the scale of the California High-Speed Rail project, from 520 miles (840 km) linking Los Angeles to San Francisco down to 119 miles (192 km) between Merced and Bakersfield, in response to spiraling costs. The State of California estimated the cost of Phase I of the project to be $77 billion, up $13 billion, but warned that the total cost could reach $100 billion. In fact, the project has been mired in cost overruns and delays. Moreover, even though it was initially planned to have one third of the funding from the private sector, the project failed to raise any funds from that source. In May 2019, the Trump administration cancels $929 million (~$1.15 billion in 2025) in funding for the construction of the railway, whose trains could travel at speeds of up to 200 miles per hour (320 km/h). In a statement, the Federal Railroad Administration (FRA) wrote that the California High-speed Rail Authority (CHSRA) "has failed to make reasonable progress on the Project" and "has abandoned its original vision of a high-speed passenger rail service connecting San Francisco and Los Angeles, which was essential to its applications for FRA grant funding." As of June 2019, the project found itself under investigation for financial malpractice. However, in July 2019, the Trump administration authorized the State of California to assume responsibility for ensuring the project is in compliance with federal environmental protection regulations, thereby lifting a major hurdle. But the Trump administration also removed a $929-million grant for this project; the money was subsequently restored by the Biden administration.

In June 2019, the FRA announced $326 million (~$404 million in 2025) in funding for rail infrastructure upgrades for 45 projects in 29 states. These grants come under the Consolidated Rail Infrastructure and Safety Improvement (CRISI) Program, authorized by Fixing America's Surface Transportation Act, and the Special Transportation Circumstances Program. One third of that amount will go to rural areas.

In early April 2020, the Trump administration issued $25 billion (~$30.6 billion in 2025) in emergency funding for public transportation networks across the United States facing a precipitous drop in ridership due to the COVID-19 pandemic. Approved a week prior by Congress, the money would go primarily to densely populated urban areas, including $5.4 billion for New York City, $1.2 billion for Los Angeles, $1.02 billion for the District of Columbia, $883 million for Boston, $879 million for Philadelphia, $820 million for San Francisco and $520 million for Seattle. Meanwhile, some $2.2 billion would go to rural areas, the FTA announced. Amtrak received a billion dollars.

In 2025, the second Trump administration reportedly forced Amtrak CEO Stephen Gardner to resign. Elon Musk, head of the Department of Government Efficiency, suggested that Amtrak be privatized. Trump also sought to freeze federal funding for major public transit projects such as the aforementioned Hudson River tunnel and the Chicago Transit Authority's Red Line Extension.

== Water management ==
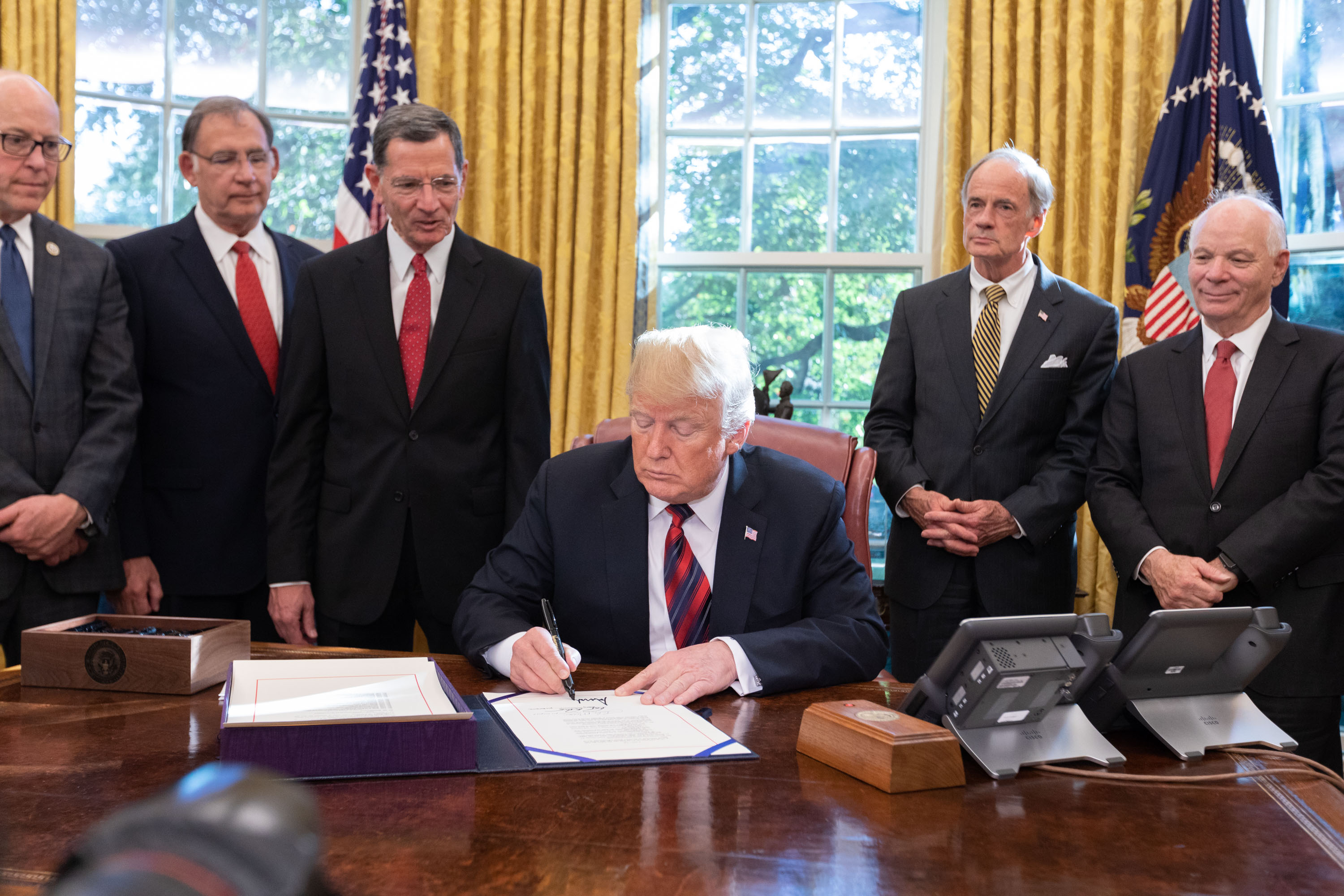
President Donald Trump signs into law the America's Water Infrastructure Act of 2018.

In October 2018, President Trump signed into law the America's Water Infrastructure Act of 2018, allocating more than $6 billion (~$7.57 billion in 2025) on water infrastructure spending of all kinds. This bipartisan bill authorizes the U.S. Army Corps of Engineers to manage water resource projects and policies nationwide. It also authorizes federal funding for various water infrastructure projects, including the expansion of water storage capabilities, and upgrades to wastewater, drinking and irrigation systems. This bill includes some $2.2 billion (~$2.73 billion in 2025) for a coastal barrier in Texas, protecting it from flood in the future. The coastal barrier includes not just flood walls and sea walls but also pumping stations, drainage facilities, and floodgates for highways and railroads. The money may also be used for ecosystem repair, upgrades to port and inland waterways, flood control, dam renovations, and enhancing drinking water facilities. Moreover, the Act reauthorizes the Water Infrastructure Finance and Innovation Act loan program.

In April 2019, after signing two executive orders on energy infrastructure projects, President Trump said he would order the Environmental Protection Agency to issue guidelines for state compliance with the Clean Water Act.

In May 2019, the Environmental Protection Agency (EPA) made $2.6 billion available for water infrastructure improvement across the United States. According to the Agency's own estimates, some $743 billion is needed, and the State Resolving Funds (SRFs), which require states to match federal funding and repay loans and interests, have provided $170 billion.

During his second term, while Congress opted to preserve much of the infrastructure funding President Trump sought to cut, he succeeded in eliminating money for projects involving DEI.

== See also ==
- Infrastructure Investment and Jobs Act of 2021
- Build Back Better Plan
