= Li Hongyuan incident =

Detention and arrest without indictment of Li Hongyuan

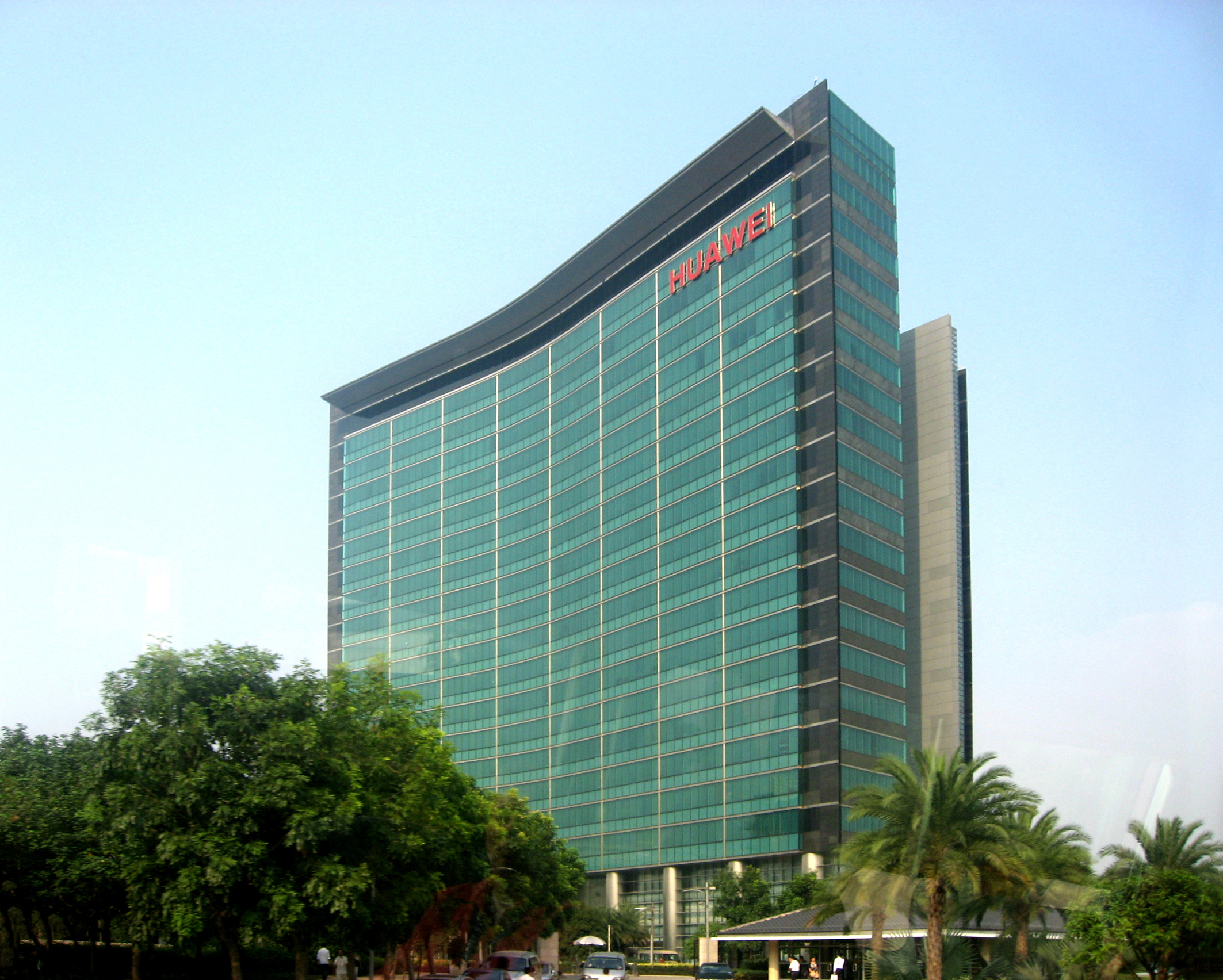
Huawei headquarters in Shenzhen, China

The Li Hongyuan Incident, or commonly cited as "Huawei 251" on the Chinese internet, refers to the 251-day detention and arrest without indictment of Li Hongyuan, a former employee of Huawei. Li had a labor dispute with Huawei and was detained for investigations on embezzlement, breach of confidentiality, and coercion from 16 December 2018 to 23 August 2019 due to the accusations by Huawei. Details of the detention were revealed in late November 2019, leading to criticism of Huawei and Chinese law enforcement authorities, while the Communist Youth League of China and Chinese left-wing nationalists blamed the incident on the United States.

== Incident details ==
=== Background ===
Li Hongyuan joined Huawei's Hangzhou branch in October 2005 after he left Zhejiang Juhua Co., Ltd., a chemical industry company in Quzhou, China. Huawei dismissed him in 2017 by refusing renewal of his labour contract. Before the dismissal, Li was a group leader for solar power inverter when he asked for a meeting with Huawei's founding CEO Ren Zhengfei to report claimed misconducts and fraud activities in his department he found out in November 2016.

Chinese Labour Contract Law requires the employer to sign a permanent contract with the employee if the employee is hired for longer than 10 years, consecutively. Neverthelss, Huawei tries to bypass the law by a firing-and-rehiring loophole to break the consecutiveness.

On the other hand, Chinese Criminal Procedure Law favors law enforcement with prosecution time limit. After initial detention, the police have three days before they request the public prosecutorate for arrest warrant, while the prosecutors have seven days to make the decision on arrest. The police then have two months for investigation after the arrest before the case is presented to the prosecutors. The prosecutors have another month to decide whether they will indict the suspects or not. All of the time limits can be extended.

=== Labor dispute ===
Li filed a claim to Huawei for a dismissal financial compensation as if he signed the permanent labour contract with Huawei. The difference of his compensation for 12-year employment between the fix-term and permanent contracts is 304,742.98 Chinese yuan.

Huawei eventually agreed with Li. The agreement was signed on 31 January 2018 between Li and Huawei represented by a human resource manager He. On 8 March Li travelled to Huawei's headquarter in Shenzhen to pick up the payment, which was transferred from a private bank account of the manager He's secretary Zhou. Some concerns were raised immediately about the private transfer and the related income tax issue. Huawei assured Li that its human resource department would handle things properly.

Li later found out that Huawei did not pay the annual bonus of 2017, which was around 200 thousand yuan. Huawei claimed the bonus was not paid due to Li's inefficient behavior. On 7 November 2018 Li sued Huawei for the annual bonus.

=== Detention ===
On 16 December 2018 the local police department in Shenzhen compulsorily summoned Li for an investigation on embezzlement as a result of Huawei's complaint reports. Li was detained in his sleep and his house was searched in the evening. Li said the police officers then questioned him on some issues of breach of confidenciality when he was detained for the criminal investigations. The Public Prosecutorate of Longgang, Shenzhen approved the arrest warrant on 22 January 2019.

The Public Security Bureau of Shenzhen Municipality eventually accused Li of coercing the human resource manager He for the payment of 300 thousand yuan. On 21 March, Shenzhen PSB transferred the case to the Public Prosecutorate of Longgang, Shenzhen for review and requested an indictment. Li said he and the other six former Huawei employees were not informed about the coecion case until 16 April. The very next day, Li asked his lawyer to fetch a recording of his conversation with manager He from Li's wife, who later presented the recording to the public prosecutor. Then on 19 April, the public prosecutor sent back the case to Shenzhen PSB for supplemental investigation.

The local police department resubmitted the case with supplemental reports on 17 May. However, the public prosecutor sent them back again on 19 June. Then again for the third time, the case was resubmitted on 12 July. It was said that the manager He retracted his testimony on the "coercion" in July. The Public Prosecutorate extended the time limit of the third review for 15 days on 13 August. And lastly, a decision of non-prosecution was made on 23 August for lack of evidence. Li Hongyuan was finally released after detaintion and arrest for 251 days.

=== Aftermath ===
Li's grandfather died while Li was detained. On 25 November 2019 a state compensation of CN¥107,055.94 was offered by the Public Prosecutorate of Longgang, Shenzhen. The Prosecutorate also sent letters to Huawei and Zhejiang Juhua, Li's former employers, for clarification. Li shared the letters with other former Huawei employees who also had labor disputes with Huawei. A post titled "an open letter to Ren Zhengfei from Li Hongyuan" was uploaded onto Huawei's internal forum. The letters were reposted on the Internet and caused huge attention and criticism.

Li said during interviews on 2 December that his intention was not to create a public-relations storm but to have a dialogue with Huawei, who had refused to talk with him since his release. He called on Huawei to offer a formal apology. Nevertheless, the interviews were taken down after the following statement from Huawei:

It is the company's right and duty to report any suspected illegal activities to the law enforcing authorities. Huawei respects the decisions made by the authorities, including the Public Security Bureau, the Prosecutorate, and the Court of Law. If Li Hongyuan believed his rights and privileges were offended, Huawei supports him to use the legal weapons to protect himself, including suing Huawei. This reflects the spirit of rule of law, where everyone is equal before the law.

— Huawei

Guangdong Yiben Law Firm, who represented Li, then issued a statement saying the "open letter" was not written by Li himself because he had already lost the access for posting on the internal forum. Li commented that the incident and its aftermath had been out of control, so he decided to leave Shenzhen. As a reply to Huawei's statement,

Let's take a look first, and I will follow the opinions from the people.

— Li Hongyuan

Later, Li expressed his reluctance to sue Huawei because he still felt emotional connections. Li said Huawei is a big company and is the hope of the future in China. Nonetheless, Li believed the company could not grow healthy on the current path so he wanted a conversation with Ren Zhengfei.

On 5 December Huawei CLO Song Liuping thanked the public attention on Huawei but claimed that the incident was not a labor dispute but a report on suspected illegal activities. On 9 December Li Hongyuan claimed on Weibo that the Public Prosecutorate of Shenzhen Municipality was building a case against the false accusation, perjury, dereliction of duty, and malfeasance in the incident. But the Prosecutorate denied the claim.

Six months later on 3 June 2020 Li Hongyuan filed an arbitration request to the Labour-Dispute Arbitration Commission of Longgang, Shenzhen for resuming the labour contract between him and Huawei, and requesting for the salaries, bonuses, and social benefits as if he had not been dismissed. The commission overruled the request in August. Then Li sued Huawei for misleading him on the dismissal agreement. The Court of Law of Longgang, Shenzhen ruled on 10 January 2022 that:

* In view of the collection of dismissal financial compensation by Li Hongyuan, without further evidence, the request to void the dismissal agreement shall not be supported.

- Huawei's claim that the supervising manager He agreeing privately to pay extra financial compensation was a break of Huawei's guideline and did not represent Huawei's true intention, shall not accepted by this Court of Law.

— People's Court of Law of Longgang, Shenzhen, (2020)粤0307民初31798号判决

== Criticism ==
=== Of Huawei and the authorities ===
The Paper, a digital news outlet in Shanghai commented in an editorial that "Huawei Wolf" and "996" working hours represent the culture of efficiency first which is no longer suitable for the era. Huawei's inhumane cruel treatment toward its former employees breachs the trust of its partners and customers. Later, the chief commentator Shen Bin said Huawei's refusal of apology terrifies the people. The development of an enterprise must respect the other's dignities.

Qianjiang Evening News in Hangzhou criticised on Huawei's statement that Huawei shows no respect to the law at all. Huawei is bullying and suppressing its dissidents with strength. The people are eager for the rule of law more than the progress of technology. The article was deleted on 4 December.

The New York Times pointed out on 5 December that Huawei is losing the people's support during this incident. The middle-class Chinese mainlanders are expressing their angers in the fear of that the same incident might have happened on themselves.

The Financial Times in London quoted a labour lawyer Pang Kun that the authorities are paying much more attention on Huawei instead of the employees due to its great strength and influence. He said it was quite common in Shenzhen that the local police detained dozens of people who had in dispute with Huawei every year. In an editorial on the Southern Metropolis Daily in Guangzhou, the law enforcing authorities were criticised that had the false accusations by Huawei not been investigated properly, the public power would lose its credits day by day,

=== Of Huawei's competitors and the United States ===
Chinese left-wing nationalists blamed Huawei's global competitors and the United States of America for using this incident as an excuse for attack.

Hu Xijin, the chief editor of nationalist Global Times supported Huawei's statement. He said although this incident exposed the internal managing issues in Huawei, Huawei is doing well on sticking to its original attitude towards suspected illegal activities. He believed after the report of crime, Huawei had no power to interfere or control the legal process. He suggested that Huawei should not settle this incident with Li Hongyuan in private but must go to the Court of Law. Xu Zhouyang, an anchor on the state media CCTV, satirized Hu saying if the reader does not know the details but only read Hu's comment, he or she might find that it must be Huawei who had been framed for 251 days in jail.

On 4 December, Huawei's Customer CEO Yu Chengdong repost an article by Zhidao Xuegong entitled as "The Black Public Relation Carnival against Huawei". The article believed this incident is a result of paid cyber attacks from the United States and Huawei's competitors including Zhihu. The cost should be around tens of billions. Huawei's Senior Vice President Chen Lifang defended Yu in her speech at Tsinghua University that the criminal report by Huawei strictly followed the law. Yu had to repost the article because he could no longer stand the grievance. She asked the audience to be patient and the truth of Li Hongyuan's crime would be revealed soon.

The Communist Youth League of China also reposted an article by Housha on 6 December entitled "VOICE: Huawei had been bombarded by thousands of guns overnight, but the attacker's fox tails were exposed immediately”. The article called on the people who care about “Li X-yuan” to have patience and not to be misled by American spies and news outlets.

Later on 11 December 2019, Ren Zhengfei responded in an interview

Huawei had been as "red as purple" for a while. If the people throw some black dirts on Huawei, Huawei will turn gray, which our true color should be rather than "red as purple". Even when the society believed Huawei was doing well, there were so many difficulties inside Huawei.

— Ren Zhengfei

== Similar cases ==
In 2002 former Huawei employees Wang Zhijun, Liu Ning, and Qin Xuejun were reported by Huawei and detained for 2 years under suspect of breaching confidentiality.

In 2018 Zeng Meng, a former worker in Huawei Wireless department was also detained for 90 days.

Apart from Li and Zeng, in December 2018 at least three other former Huawei employees having labor disputes were detained for breaching confidentiality. One of them pleaded guilty, one was still under detention, and the third one had been released after 30-day detention.
