= 2018 China–African Union espionage allegations =

Scandal involving the AU headquarters building

In January 2018, French newspaper Le Monde Afrique published a story alleging that the headquarters of the African Union in Addis Ababa was being spied on by the Chinese government. The surveillance was believed to have begun in 2012, when the headquarters of the African Union was opened, and was conducted via bugging equipment and digital backdoors installed in the building's electronics during construction.

Both the equipment manufacturer Huawei and the Chinese government denied the allegations. The African Union also publicly denied that such an incident had occurred, although one African Union official later stated that there were "many issues with the building that are still being resolved with the Chinese. It's not just cyber security." The African Union continued to partner with Huawei.

== Background ==
The AU Conference Centre and Office Complex, pictured in 2015

On November 5, 2006, during the 2006 Forum on China–Africa Cooperation in Beijing, the Chinese government announced the funding of a new building to house the headquarters of the African Union, the African Union Conference Center and Office Complex. The entire project, estimated to have cost US$200 million, was entirely funded by China. Construction began in 2009, and was carried out by both Chinese and African workers. The complex was completed and opened in 2012.

China's funding of the African Union headquarters was part of a larger project to invest in African development, which also included the establishment of a China-Africa Development Fund, US$3 billion in loans for debt relief and development, and US$2 billion in export buyer's credit.

== Le Monde allegations ==
According to Le Monde Afrique, in January 2017, the African Union's IT department noticed that their server traffic was unusually full between midnight and 2 a.m. local time, when few people were working. Upon further investigation, the department discovered that data was being collected and transferred to servers in Shanghai, and that this had been occurring since 2012. Microphones and listening devices were also subsequently found to have been planted throughout the building. The allegations received coverage from other news organizations and led to an official statement by China's foreign affairs ministry. Spokespeople for the African Union declined to comment.

The African Union replaced its server and communications technology – previously supplied by Chinese conglomerate Huawei – with its own, allegedly refusing a Chinese government offer to configure the new equipment. The AU stopped using Ethio telecom, and the encryption of communications was strengthened. The new security system was tested during the July 2017 AU summit, with Algerian and Ethiopian cybersecurity experts inspecting the building.

== Reactions ==
After publication, African Union and Chinese officials denied the allegations, including the head of the African Union Commission, Moussa Faki. In February 2018, Faki described the allegations as "all lies" and stated that "no maneuvers could distract and divert us from our mission" of strengthening ties between the AU and China. Rwandan President and then-chairman of the AU, Paul Kagame, stated that he was not worried by the discovery, but expressed regret for the African Union not self-funding its headquarters, and instead relying on the Chinese government. An unnamed African Union official told the Financial Times that there were "many issues with the building that are still being resolved with the Chinese", and one African diplomat attending an AU conference was later quoted in the publication as stating that there "would be a lot of anger over [the situation]".

The Chinese ambassador to the African Union, Kuang Weilin, called the allegations "absurd" and "preposterous" and claimed they were intended to put pressure on Sino-African relations. China's ministry of foreign affairs also issued a statement, labelling the allegations "baseless" and "complete nonsense".

In June 2019, the African Union Commission and Huawei signed a memorandum of understanding to further increase IT cooperation in areas include broadband, the Internet of Things, cloud computing, 5G, AI, and the training of African IT personnel. Huawei's vice president for North Africa, Philippe Wang, stated that the agreement demonstrated AU's continuing trust in Huawei. Wang stated that the agreement should end rumors of data leakage and that "AU has totally audited their IT system for the whole organization and nothing corroborates what was said in media reports one year ago."

In 2020, Japan's Computer Emergency Response Team (CERT) reported that a suspected Chinese hacking organization dubbed "Bronze President" had hacked and extracted footage from the AU Headquarters' security cameras.

Writing in 2024, academics Christopher Foster et al. note that the allegations generated more interest in the global north countries than in Africa.

== See also ==
- Chinese intelligence activity abroad
- Internet censorship and surveillance in Africa
- Sino-African relations
- AU Conference Center and Office Complex
