= Tacitus Trap =

Political theory named after Tacitus

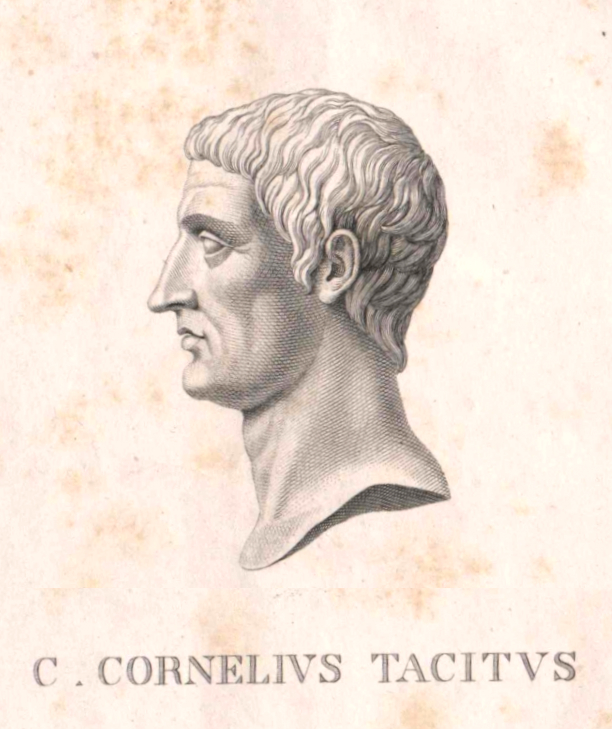
The Roman historian Tacitus

Tacitus Trap is a political theory named after Roman historian Tacitus, which describes a situation where an unpopular government is hated no matter what it does and whether it is right or wrong. The theory was brought up in a 2007 book by Professor Pan Zhichang from the School of Journalism and Communication at Nanjing University. In the book, he quoted Tacitus' remark on Galba, an unpopular emperor of Rome, to explain the recurrent declines of Chinese dynasties throughout history: "When a government is unpopular, either good policies or bad policies tell against the government itself." Since China’s top leader and General Secretary of the Chinese Communist Party Xi Jinping's use of the term in 2014, it has become increasingly popular in journalism and academia in China. State-run media in China, such as People's Daily online, noted Xi Jinping's worries about the Tacitus Trap, Thucydides Trap and the middle-income trap.

== Etymology ==
Tacitus is a Roman politician and historian famous for his book Histories, where he also included his moral judgements over historical events he experienced in person. In 69 AD, when Nero fled Rome amid a revolution against him, the civil and military authorities disconnected from him elected Galba, the then governor of Hispania Tarraconensis who supported and led the revolt, as the new emperor, which was challenged by Clodius Macer and Fonteius Capito, two loyal generals of Nero, who cut off the food supply to Rome. However, when Galba executed the two generals, the executions were not positively received among Roman citizens, on which Tacitus comments in Histories, "indeed, when a ruler once becomes unpopular, all his acts, be they good or bad, tell against him."

In the 2007 book Who Robbed Our Aestheticism, the author Pan Zhichang, a Chinese aesthetician from the School of Journalism and Communication at Nanjing University, analyses the etiology of historical political chaos during 220–280 AD, which inspired the stories in the Chinese classic Romance of the Three Kingdoms. He describes the government of Imperial China as a totalitarian regime with unlimited power and therefore unlimited desires for wealth. As the emperor taxed more on the people, the country would be more corrupted by its officials, which in turn led to more taxation and even more corruption, eventually causing a societal collapse due to the unlimited desires of the ruling class. This also means the regime had fallen into the Tacitus trap.

Chinese writer Chen Xubin quotes Zigong in The Analects, "Zhou's wickedness was not so great as that name implies. Therefore, the superior man hates to dwell in a low-lying situation, where all the evil of the world will flow in upon him," and reasons that "Zigong's trap" may be a more proper name for the theory and that famous Chinese politicians, such as Empress Cixi and H. H. Kung, all fell into the trap.

== Popular uses in Chinese politics ==
In 2014, General Secretary Xi Jinping of the Chinese Communist Party mentioned the term "Tacitus Trap" when he attended the meeting of the Party's Lankao County Committee. He then added, "if we lose the viewpoints of the people, fail to stand with the people, the people will not have you in their eyes." Since then, the term had become popular across China, especially in news media and academia. According to Dr Mi Siru at Nanjing University, as of 5 November 2017, there had been 328,000 results and 284 news articles containing the term when searching it with Baidu, along with many scholarly articles containing the term within their titles in CNKI database.

In 2016, state-run media in China, such as People's Daily online, summarised that since the 18th National Congress of the Chinese Communist Party, Party general secretary Xi Jinping has described three traps that China might fall into, that is, Tacitus Trap, Thucydides's Trap and middle-income trap. When Hong Kong tycoon Lo Wing Hung commented on this summary in his newspaper Bastille Post, he concluded that CY Leung, the then Hong Kong Chief Executive, had fallen into the trap. Another article in Hong Kong's Apple Daily also made a similar conclusion based on the theory.
