= Canada–North Korea relations =

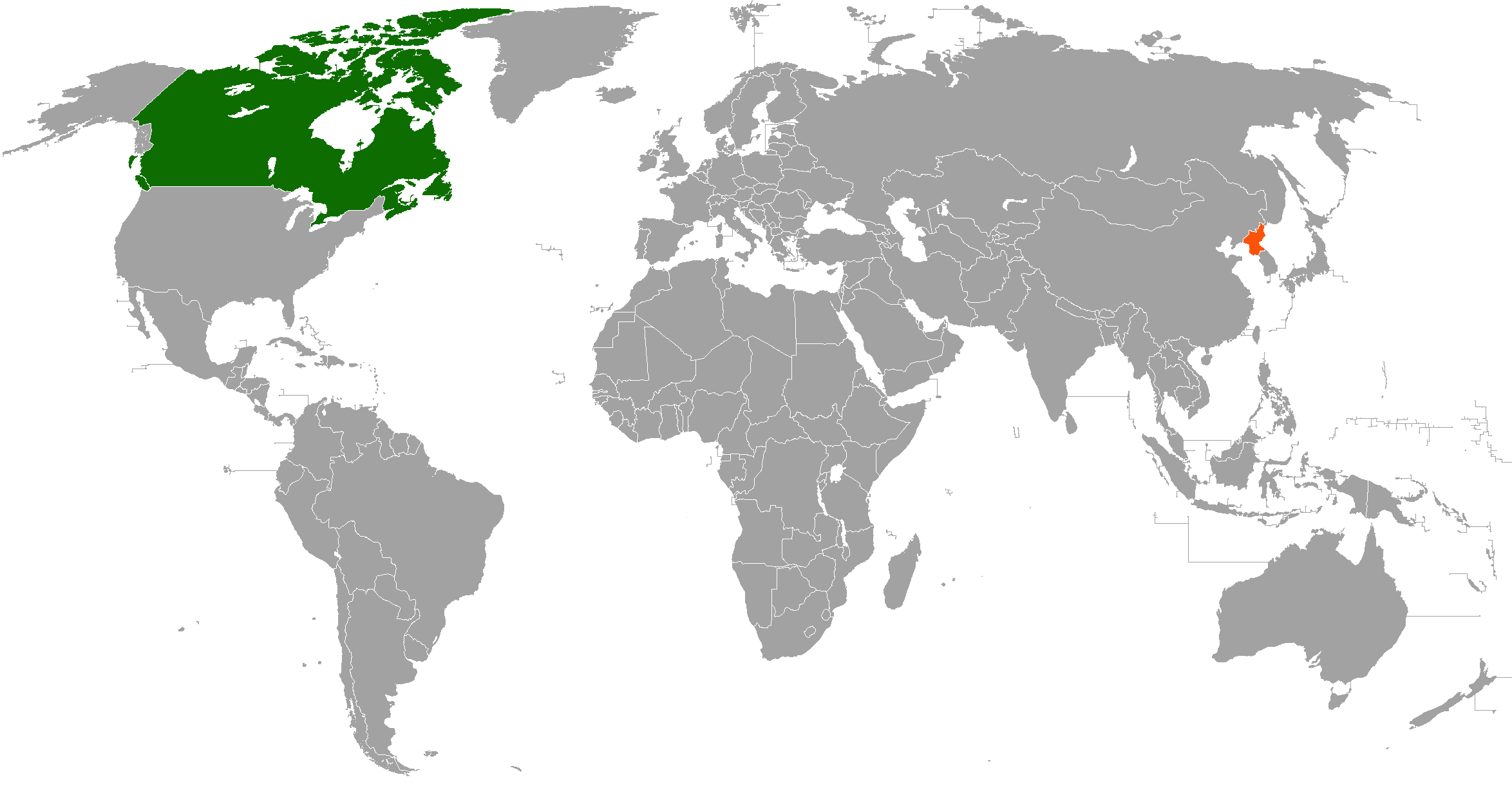

- Canada: North Korea

Relations between Canada and the Democratic People's Republic of Korea (commonly known as North Korea) are very limited. However, Canada recognized North Korea in 2000 and established diplomatic relations with North Korea in 2001. Canada suspended full diplomatic relations in 2010 over North Korea's destabilizing nuclear activity. Travel and commerce with North Korea are discouraged by the Canadian government and there is very little trade or diplomatic contact due to Canada's perspective that North Korea plays a destabilizing role in the Asia Pacific region.

Canada has staunch opposition to North Korea's nuclear ambitions and programs, and as a result, contact between them has been limited. Consequently, there has never been an official embassy built in either of the two nations. This is replaced by a Controlled Engagement Policy limiting official bilateral contact to specific topics. Canada is officially represented by the Ambassador of Canada to Korea resident in the South Korean capital Seoul, and North Korea is represented through their permanent representative to the United Nations in New York. Sweden acts as the protecting power for Canadian citizens that travel to North Korea. North Korea has requested for an ambassador and mission to be created, but Canada has declined.

According to a 2013 BBC World Service Poll, only 7% of Canadians view North Korea's influence positively, with 79% expressing a negative view.

== History ==
Contact between Canada and Korea dates back to the 19th century, when Canadians were among the first Westerners to arrive on the Korean Peninsula. Most of them were Christian missionaries, though they branched out into other fields of work such as education, healthcare, and agriculture. One of them was the reverend James Scarth Gale (1863-1937). He was the first Canadian missionary in Korea. Arriving in Busan, Korea, in 1888, Gale provided more than evangelizing but was "responsible for introducing Western ideas to the Korean people, for he wrote in their own language". Gale's well-known achievements in Korea included his Korean-English Dictionary, and the translation of The Pilgrim's Progress, and both the Old and New Testament in the Bible. His Korean-English Dictionary became the first and most essential tool for the scholarly study of Korean in the West: "Gale's dictionaries were the third large-scale Korean-Westerner language dictionary". His translation of the Bible into Korean constituted the foundation of Korean Christianity. In addition, he not only translated English literature into Korean but also translated Korean works into English. For example, Korean literature Gale translated into English include, Chunhyangjeon (The Tale of Chunhyang), Sim Cheong jeon, Sugyeong jeon, and Hong Gil-dong jeon, and many more.

Another well-known Canadian missionary who arrived in Korea was Dr. Oliver R. Avison (1860–1956), who "founded the Severance Hospital and Severance Medical College," which were the first medical college and general hospital in Korea. Avison introduced Western medical techniques as he became the "founder of Westernized, modern medicine in Korea". Avison believes that spiritual well-being and good health are interconnected, suggesting that prayer and scientific methods can work together harmoniously, emphasizing that Christian spirituality and medical excellence complement each other while emphasizing the importance of balancing body, mind, and spirit for effective missionary work and overall development. Today, the Sererance Hospital "is the most reputable hospital in Korea". He did not only contribute to the dissemination of the word of God but also further improved the development in the medical and education sector in Korea.

Malcolm Fenwick (1865–1935) is another key figure in the legacy of Canadian-Korean relations. Fenwick settled in Wôsan, North Korea, where he went beyond spreading Christianity, as he also introduced Western farming methods and made suggestions for improvements in their farming techniques. There, he bought a plot of land, constructed a house, and began to cultivate the land, starting a garden that he tended to. He named his land "Brookhill," or "Kalmay" in Korean, where he planted apple trees and celery as his primary sources of income, since, upon his arrival in Korea, he had not received any funding to support his endeavors. Moreover, Fenwick "contributed greatly to the formation of the Korean Baptist Church and the establishment of an indigenous and self supporting Baptist Church in Korea". He had discovered the "power and influence of native Korean Christians' own testimonies in spreading the good news in Korea"; therefore, he found that to effectively communicate the gospel to Korean people, it would have to come from Korean people themselves. These early Canadian missionaries, through their contributions to education, healthcare, and agriculture, laid a foundation of cooperation between the two nations.

Official contact began in 1947 when Canada participated in the United Nations Commission overseeing election in Korea. Canada formally recognized the Republic of Korea in 1949 and the Democratic People's Republic in 2000.

When the war broke out between North and South Korea in 1950, Canada sent 26,971 military personnel to Korea as part of United Nations Command, the third largest contingent behind the United States and the United Kingdom; 516 Canadians died in the war.

On 25 May 2010, Canada suspended diplomatic relations with North Korea over its alleged role in the sinking of ROKS Cheonan.

In December 2018, Michael Spavor, a Canadian consultant who worked with North Korea was arrested for alleged espionage in China. Michael Spavor had strong personal ties with North Korean leader Kim Jong Un. Michael Spavor founded a non-profit organization facilitating cooperation and cross-cultural exchange with North Korea. The reasoning as to why China would go after Spavor, a friend of North Korea, is unclear despite China's and North Korea's allegiance. However, Meng Wanzhou, a chief financial officer of Huawei and the daughter of the CEO of Huawei, was arrested in Canada for fraudulently violating sanctions that prohibited trade with Iran. The South Korean news outlet that tracks North Korea said that both "Spavor and Kovrig are being detained arbitrarily and vowed to continue to call for their immediate release."

== Canadian NGOs ==
CanKor is one organization contributing to the dialogue over Canada's role with DPR Korea., as well as Michael Spavor's Peaktu Cultural Exchange with North Korea. The only known source is Michael Spavor's LinkedIn page, which posts opportunities for business and cultural exchange. However, there are no current postings.

=== Humanitarian aid ===
There are a small number of organizations providing aid to DPR Korea. First Steps is a Vancouver-based Christian development organization.

Canadian Foodgrains Bank is a partnership of Canadian churches and church-based agencies.

Mennonite Central Committee is also an organization that provides aid to the impoverished Korean nation.

=== Refugee resettlement ===
Canada has played a significant role in resettling North Korean defectors, though the process has faced challenges. One of the challenges is that North Korean refugees typically travel to South Korea before seeking asylum in other countries. Many North Korean refugees passing through South Korea are automatically granted South Korean citizenship. This automatic citizenship creates administrative difficulties when they apply for refugee status in Canada. Since South Korean citizens are not generally considered in need of asylum, Canada has often rejected North Korean refugee claims and, in some cases, deported individuals back to South Korea.

Between 2008 and 2012, the acceptance rate for North Korean refugee claimants in Canada fell from 90% to 0%, largely due to claimants' failure to disclose their South Korean citizenship. Many claimants were unaware of how South Korean citizenship impacted their asylum applications or feared that disclosing it would harm their chances of being accepted. This failure to disclose triggered deportation processes. While Canada has legal obligations not to return refugees to face persecution, this does not extend to cases of discrimination.

In 2021, Canada launched a pilot program in collaboration with HanVoice to facilitate the private sponsorship of North Korean refugees. The initiative prioritizes vulnerable individuals, particularly women and children. A key feature of this program is its involvement of the Korean diaspora in Canada. Private organizations, including HanVoice and various Korean church communities, have been enabled to sponsor North Korean refugees. This approach has created an alternative pathway for entry into Canada, accommodating the unique citizenship challenges faced by North Korean refugees traveling through South Korea.

By allowing the Korean diaspora in Canada to play a significant role in the resettlement process, this program has also enhanced the integration of North Korean refugees into Canadian society. Korean Christian communities, which have a strong presence in Canada, provide vital support through language programs, workshops, financial assistance, and cultural festivals. These church communities offer a sense of belonging and help preserve cultural identity among North Korean refugees.

Faith-based organizations in Canada not only offer practical assistance but also highlight the country's commitment to religious freedom and cultural diversity. Many North Korean refugees experience discrimination in South Korea and fear for their safety due to potential threats from North Korean operatives. For these refugees, Canada offers a safe haven, far removed from the geopolitical tensions of the Korean Peninsula.

=== Advocacy organizations ===
HanVoice is a Canadian non-profit organization that was first established to support the resettlement of DPR Korean refugees in Canada and has grown over the years to become the largest Canadian organization advocating for improved human rights in North Korea.

== Canadian academic institutions ==
UBC's Institute of Asian Research houses the Centre for Korean Research. In 1993, the center was established as a constituent part of the Institute of Asian Research. It was established to facilitate multidisciplinary research on Korea.

York University provides a focus on North Korea through its York Centre for Asian Research, Korean Studies Group. This group brings the study of South Korea, DPR Korea, and the Korean diaspora together, investigating the formation of the national division and shifting boundaries of the nation. Drawing scholars together from different disciplines, it seeks to develop a comparative perspective that places Korean affairs in dialogue with historical, global and theoretical changes.

The University of Toronto houses the Centre for the Study of Korea, Asian Institute, Munk School of Global Affairs. The centre was established in the fall of 2006 with the goal of promoting critical approaches to the research of Korea.

== Friendship organizations ==
The Korean Friendship Association is also active in Canada, hosting events such as leafleting, movies, educational, and other projects to help show the DPRK and promote solidarity.

== Travel advisories ==
The Canadian government strongly advises against all travel to North Korea due to significant risks, including arbitrary detention and uncertain security situation stemming from its nuclear weapons development program and highly repressive regime. Additionally, there is no resident Canadian government office in North Korea, and the ability of Canadian officials to provide consular assistance is extremely limited.

== Notable detentions -- Pastor Hyeon Soo Lim ==
=== Background ===
Pastor Hyeon Soo Lim, a South Korean-born Canadian citizen, led the Light Korea Presbyterian Church in Toronto and had visited North Korea over 100 times for humanitarian missions, such as to schools, nursing homes, and orphanages. His goal was to reduce the suffering of North Korean people through these missions.

=== Arrest and charges ===
In February 2015, Lim was on a humanitarian mission in Rajin, and was detained by North Korean authorities.
