= Claws of the Panda =

2019 non-fiction book by Jonathan Manthorpe

Claws of the Panda: Beijing's Campaign of Influence and Intimidation in Canada
- Author: Jonathan Manthorpe
- Language: English
- Subject: Chinese Communist Party, Canada–China relations, Chinese Canadians, Chinese dissidents
- Genre: Non-fiction
- Set in: Canada and the People's Republic of China
- Publisher: Cormorant Books
- Publication date: 5 January 2019
- Publication place: Canada
- Pages: 336
- ISBN: 9781770865396 (Paperback)

Claws of the Panda: Beijing's Campaign of Influence and Intimidation in Canada is a 2019 book by Jonathan Manthorpe about Canada's foreign relations with the People's Republic of China (PRC) and the influence of the Chinese Communist Party in Canada. Manthorpe argues that Canada and the PRC have a clash of values and that Canada has been a victim of multiple abuses by Beijing including spying, abductions, human rights abuses, intellectual property theft, monitoring and intimidating Chinese Canadians and Chinese dissidents, and other attempts to influence Canadian policy. His thesis is that the PRC has been able to implement such policies for a number of years due to naivete by Canadian policy makers. In the book, Manthorpe advocates for a change in Canadian foreign policy towards the PRC.

It was published around the same time as a period of strained relations between the two countries following the arrest of Huawei's deputy chair and CFO Meng Wanzhou in Canada in December 2018 and two subsequent arrests of Canadian citizens (Michael Kovrig and Michael Spavor) in the PRC. Canada accused the PRC of arresting Kovrig and Spavor in retaliation for the Meng arrest.

Manthorpe has clarified that the book is "not a book about Canadians of Chinese heritage" and was concerned about the book being used to provoke sentiment against Chinese Canadians. He also mentioned that it was "wrong, and ultimately dangerous, to view the CCP's infiltration of Canada as racial".

== See also ==
- Wilful Blindness
