= The Michaels =

The Michaels may be

- Michael Leshner and Michael Stark, the men who in 2003 entered into the first legal same-sex marriage in Canada.
- Michael Kovrig and Michael Spavor, Canadians formerly detained in China.
- The Michaels Companies
