= Huawei the Beautiful =

2019 children's song praising Huawei

Huawei the Beautiful (also translated Huawei is Beautiful, Huawei Beauty, Huawei is Beauty, Chinese: 华为美; pinyin: Huáwéi Měi) is a children's song about Huawei mobile phones and Chinese patriotism, written by Li Yourong and Zang Sijia and composed by Zheng Lengheng. The song was first released as a music video on 25 February 2019 on one of the WeChat public accounts of Zhuhai Children's Choir, and then became popular on the Internet.

== Background ==
In July 2018, the United States, Australia, Canada, New Zealand, the United Kingdom, and other countries restricted Huawei's products due to alleged cybersecurity risks. On 1 December 2018, Meng Wanzhou, Huawei's vice chairperson and chief financial officer then, was arrested by Canadian police.

== Content ==
Which phone is the best in the world?
Everybody says it is Huawei.
The battery is long-lasting, the phone looks good,
Chinese microchips are the most precious!
Huawei is good, oh Huawei is beautiful,
Huawei adds wisdom to me!
Teacher tells me to love the motherland
and Chinese-made smartphones, love Huawei!
(Chinese: 天下手机谁最美？大家都说是华为！电池耐用形色好，中国芯片最珍贵！华为好呀华为美，华为给我增智慧！老师教我爱祖国，国产手机爱华为！)

— The first section of the lyrics

In the lyrics, the song praised the advantages of Huawei's mobile phones and the meaning of Huawei's name, and said that children should set lofty ambitions from an early age and contribute to the motherland like Huawei when they grow up.

The main location of the music video was the square at the entrance of the Zhuhai Grand Theatre, and 29 children from Mainland China, Hong Kong and Macau participated in the performance and singing, wearing T-shirts with bilingual words "China" printed.

== Reception ==
=== Official response ===
Huawei's official Weibo account Huawei Fans Club said that the song was not officially produced by Huawei, but by lovers who like Huawei, and they were not aware of it before; They also expressed their gratitude to the users who supported Huawei and promised to continue to make Huawei's products better to repay consumers' trust and support.

=== Positive ===
Global Times, an outlet of China's state media People's Daily, claimed on its official Twitter that this video shows how Chinese people are supporting the telecom giant.

Some online posts said that the melody of the song is beautiful; the lyrics and composition are older old artists, who can love the works produced in China so much, which is worthy of admiration. Some netizens also said that the song reflects the strength of China and they are proud of it.

=== Negative ===
Some Weibo users said that the lyrics were unnatural and sounded embarrassing. Many comments likened the style to North Korean propaganda and questioned the authenticity of China's self-developed chips mentioned in it. Some people also accused the music video of using an iPhone to take a selfie in a video meant to praise Huawei. Others said that the song may have a counterproductive negative effect. Some described it as a "suicide marketing campaign". One Weibo user questioned that the song may "push Huawei into the fire".
