= Extradition case of Meng Wanzhou =

Canadian legal dispute

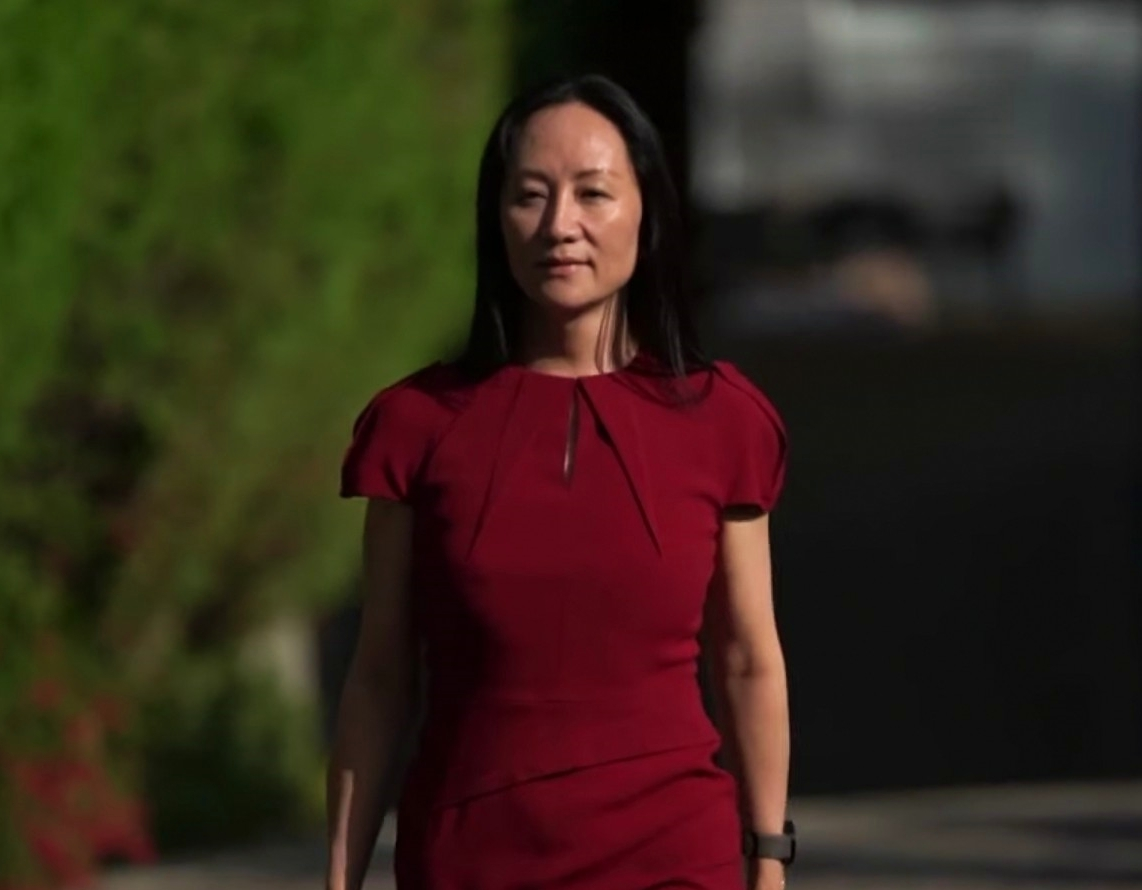
Meng Wanzhou during her house arrest in Vancouver in 2021

On December 1, 2018, Meng Wanzhou, the board deputy chairperson and daughter of the founder of the Chinese multinational technology corporation Huawei, was detained upon arrival at Vancouver International Airport by Canada Border Services Agency (CBSA) officers for questioning, which lasted three hours. The Royal Canadian Mounted Police subsequently arrested her on a provisional U.S. extradition request for fraud and conspiracy to commit fraud in order to circumvent U.S. sanctions against Iran. On January 28, 2019, the United States Department of Justice formally announced financial fraud charges against Meng. The first stage of the extradition hearing for Meng began Monday, January 20, 2020, and concluded on May 27, 2020, when the Supreme Court of British Columbia ordered the extradition to proceed.

During the extradition courtroom proceedings, Meng's lawyers made several allegations against the prosecution, including allegations of unlawful detention of Meng, unlawful search and seizure, extradition law violations, misrepresentation, international law violation, and fabricated testimonies by the CBSA, each of which were responded to by the prosecution. In August 2021, the extradition judge questioned the regularity of the case and expressed great difficulty in understanding how the Record of Case (ROC) presented by the US supported their allegation of criminality.

On September 24, 2021, the Department of Justice announced it had reached a deal with Meng to resolve the case through a deferred prosecution agreement. As part of the deal, Meng agreed to a statement of facts that said she had made untrue statements to HSBC to enable transactions in the United States, at least some of which supported Huawei's work in Iran in violation of U.S. sanctions, but did not have to pay a fine nor plead guilty to her key charges. The Department of Justice said it would move to dismiss all charges against Meng when the deferral period ends on 21 December 2022, on the condition that Meng is not charged with a crime before then. Meng was released from house arrest and left Canada for China on September 24, 2021; hours after news of the deal, Michael Spavor and Michael Kovrig, two Canadian citizens whose arrest in mainland China were widely seen as retaliation for Meng's arrest in Canada, were released from detention in China and flown back to Canada. On December 2, 2022, the presiding judge dismissed the charges against Meng following the United States government's request.

== Detention ==
=== Arrest and allegations ===
On December 1, 2018, while transferring planes at Vancouver International Airport en route to Mexico from Hong Kong, Meng was arrested by the Royal Canadian Mounted Police (RCMP) at the request of the United States, pursuant to the extradition treaty between Canada and the United States. On December 7, it was revealed that an arrest warrant had been issued on August 22, 2018, by the United States District Court for the Eastern District of New York. According to Crown counsel in Canadian court, Meng was "charged with conspiracy to defraud multiple international institutions." The warrant was based on allegations that Wanzhou had cleared money that was claimed to be for Huawei, but was actually for Skycom, an entity claimed to be entirely controlled by Huawei, which was said to be dealing with Iran, contrary to sanctions. According to the defence lawyer, the bank involved in the dealings was HSBC. The allegations were rejected by Meng's defence lawyer, who claimed she did not break any U.S. or Canadian laws, and that the US had deliberately omitted key information on two PowerPoint slides that showed that Meng was upfront to HSBC about the true nature of the Skycom/Huawei relationship. The Crown counsel said that the case against Meng stemmed from a 2013 Reuters report about the company's close ties to Hong Kong-based Skycom Tech, which attempted to sell U.S. equipment to Iran, despite U.S. and European Union bans.

=== Bail ===
From December 7 to 11, Meng attended a bail hearing in Vancouver. She was released on a $10 million bail that was granted with conditions, including electronic surveillance. She was required to hand over her passports, of which seven were listed in her court records. Of the seven, 4 were from China, and 3 were from Hong Kong. A further Chinese passport whose serial number begins with "P" was not listed but was later discovered; these passports are normally issued to employees of the Chinese government for travel related to public affairs. The Hong Kong government stated that "Any holder, therefore, shall be not in possession of more than one valid HKSAR passport at any time." However, Mr Justice William Ehrcke dismissed suggestions that Meng held multiple valid travel documents from the city. Only two legitimate passports were in her possession – one issued by mainland China and one from Hong Kong – he said on Wednesday morning Hong Kong time.

=== Formal extradition request ===
Under Canada's Extradition Act, the deadline for the U.S. to request extradition was January 30, 2019 (60 days after an arrest); on January 28, the Department of Justice Canada confirmed that the U.S. had formally requested Meng's extradition. The Canadian government had until March 1, 2019, to decide whether to authorize an extradition hearing.

Also on January 28, U.S. Homeland Security Secretary Kirstjen Nielsen and other officials released a redacted version of an indictment filed January 24, 2019, against Meng personally as well as three corporate entities (including Huawei) and at least one other person whose name was redacted. Meng was charged with bank fraud, wire fraud, and conspiracies to commit bank and wire fraud. The same day, the U.S. government announced a different indictment against Huawei relating to theft of trade secrets; but that does not pertain to Meng personally.

=== Formal commencement of extradition process ===
On March 1, 2019, the Department of Justice Canada issued an Authority to Proceed, which formally commenced an extradition process in the case.

On March 3, 2019, Meng's lawyers announced that they had filed a lawsuit against the Canadian federal government, the RCMP, and the Canada Border Services Agency (CBSA). The suit, filed in the British Columbia Supreme Court, alleges that Meng had been detained, searched, and interrogated by CBSA agents before being informed that she was under arrest. The civil claim, which names three "John Doe" CBSA officers, an RCMP constable, and the Attorney General of Canada as defendants, was issued on March 1, 2019.

On March 6, 2019, Meng had a brief appearance in court where one of her lawyers, Richard Peck, claimed that the defence would be making a number of interlocutory applications to be heard before the hearing could begin. There was heavy interest in the Vancouver court appearance, with a long line of people unable to get in to the small, packed courtroom. The court's media accreditation committee was inundated with requests from reporters around the world. Outside the courthouse, protestors demonstrating against the Chinese government showed photographs of Michael Spavor and Michael Kovrig, two Canadians detained in China, and one protestor burned a Chinese flag.

On May 8, 2019, Meng appeared before court. Her legal team claimed the Canadian government is withholding key evidence relevant to how and why Meng was arrested at Vancouver International Airport, which may have been in violation of her constitutional rights at the outset of an American extradition process. During the session, Meng's defence argued "her case should be tossed anyway because: her arrest was an abuse of process; the fraud charge she is facing in the United States is for a crime that doesn't exist in Canada; and the U.S. government's extradition request represents an 'abuse of power.'" Defence lawyer Scott Fenton described U.S. President Donald Trump's comments suggesting Meng could be part of a trade deal with China as "intimidating and corrosive of the rule of law." The court ruled that Crown prosecutors must defend the level of evidence that they have so far disclosed relating to Meng's initial detention by the CBSA and subsequent arrest by the RCMP, and that Meng may move to her second Vancouver property. Her next court appearance was scheduled for September 23, 2019.

On June 10, 2019, months of appearances and submission deadlines were agreed to at a management hearing which Meng did not attend. Meng's lawyers argued that the alleged fraud levelled against Meng does not meet the requirements of double criminality, since it is based on a breach of U.S. sanctions on Iran that do not apply in Canada. Crown prosecutor John Gibb-Carsley argued against an early ruling on the issue of double criminality, saying it was wrong to separate it from the overall extradition ruling. Associate Chief Justice Heather Holmes questioned the rationale behind delaying settling the double criminality issue. Holmes set aside an early portion of the committal proceedings specifically to address the issue of double criminality.

== Courtroom arguments and proceedings ==
=== Weighing of Responsibility ===
In August 2021, Associate Chief Justice Holmes at an extradition hearing, asked whether it was reasonable for HSBC, a large bank with risk committees to rely on a single individual's assurance about companies that are not under its control. She expressed skepticism that HSBC bank could have been put at risk by Meng's PowerPoint presentation when the bank had already been well aware of the Reuters reports. She stated that in order for fraud to occur, the bank needs to be first put at risk from a misrepresentation.

=== Allegations of unlawful detention ===
Meng's defence team alleged that the process of detention of Meng Wanzhou was an unlawful conspiracy between the two agencies. Her defence team claimed that the RCMP and CBSA colluded to detain her under an immigration check without immediately informing her of her arrest, and subsequently arresting her three hours later, which amounted to a conspiracy. The defence claimed this manner of arrest was unlawful as the warrant called for her immediate arrest, and had violated Section 10 of the Charter requiring Meng to be immediately informed of her charges upon arrest. The defence argues that questions asked during the three hour period, which included her business dealings with Iran, and the CBSA officers omitting to take notes during certain sections of the questioning are evidence of a conspiracy and an unlawful arrest. The Crown Attorney responded that there was nothing unlawful or sinister about the customs detention for questioning and subsequent formal arrest, and that this process did not violate Section 10 rules.

The Attorney General offered to return the devices seized from Meng on the condition that her defence accepts the assertion that neither the Mounties or the CBSA searched them. If her defence does not accept the offer, they will have to seek a court order to have the devices forensically analyzed to determine if they were searched or not. Forensic analysis of the devices shows they were not searched; according to defence lawyer Scott Fenton, the evidence showed several of them were turned on and at least one was connected to the internet.

The Crown prosecutors described the defence's argument of a conspiracy and unlawful detention as a "fishing" expedition, and that the CBSA was only going through proper processing of Meng's entry into Canada, which was not a foregone conclusion. Defence lawyer Scott Fenton described this as "absurd," since "she was never going to be returned to Hong Kong or not allowed into Canada," adding that "in no universe of possibilities was Ms. Meng going to be turned away."

Crown lawyer Robert Frater said there is "nothing to" the allegations that the RCMP and CBSA ignored their legal obligations and that their actions during the arrest of Meng were "not at all sinister." He described the defence's allegations as a non-existent conspiracy. Meng's lawyers questioned why Meng was questioned about business in Iran by the CBSA, to which Frater responded that they must question about a traveller's alleged criminal behavior. Justice Heather Holmes asked what would have happened had Meng admitted to criminality during the interview. Frater replied, "He would make a decision about admissibility," The defence added that the CBSA did not finish Meng's admissibility examination before it was suspended and the RCMP arrested her. Crown lawyer Diba Majzub notes that even if a traveller were deemed inadmissible, the RCMP could still execute an arrest on the person while in detention or released with conditions pending a hearing.

==== Allegations of unlawful search and seizure ====
The defence also argued that Meng Wanzhou's Section 8 rights protecting against unreasonable search and seizure were violated. During the three hour period of Meng's detainment, Meng's luggage was searched and her electronic devices as well as their passcodes were taken from her. The CBSA officer who took the pass codes to Meng's phones received a 17-second phone call minutes earlier which is not accounted for in the documents. According to an email from the RCMP, her luggage was only searched for immigration and customs purposes and the RCMP officers acted "lawfully and in good faith at all times." However, the notes show the RCMP asked the FBI if they were interested in Meng's luggage. Documents released also include a correspondence between Crown lawyer John Gibb-Carsley and defence lawyer David Martin stating that the U.S. no longer seeks the electronic devices seized from Meng. The RCMP and CBSA did not immediately respond to requests for comment on the documents. Defence lawyer Richard Peck cites an affidavit from the RCMP mentioning seizing "any electronic devices ... to preserve evidence as there will be a request from the FBI." According to Peck, law enforcement and the FBI made it a priority to seize devices, and this was done without question by Canada. The CBSA responded saying there was no evidence of this.

==== CBSA hands over passcodes to RCMP ====
On October 1, 2019, Crown lawyers argued that the CBSA handed over Meng's passcodes to the RCMP by mistake and took steps to remedy this error. Crown prosecutor Diba Majzub described this as "not a deliberate action but an error" and provided an email by a CBSA officer describing it as such. The email sent from CBSA agent Nicole Goodman to Crown prosecutor John Gibb-Carsley, says:

I became aware the passcodes for the phone were provided in error to the RCMP at the time of the transfer of Ms Meng and her belongings. ... I advised the RCMP the passcodes should not have been provided by CBSA as the passcodes were CBSA information obtained during the CBSA examination, and the passcodes could not be used to access the devices nor shared with a third party (ie: other law enforcement agency).

The CBSA asked for the passcodes to be returned but the RCMP refused, stating that this was impossible as they had already become part of the court record of Meng's case. The next day, Gibb-Carsley argued that there is no evidence the RCMP ever requested or used the passcodes while there is evidence they were given by the CBSA in error. Justice Holmes questioned CBSA's use of Mylar bags (anti-tampering equipment) to contain the seized devices and their association with the U.S. extradition request. Notes by the RCMP from the morning of December 1 say the CBSA will locate Meng's phones as requested by the FBI and put them in Mylar bags at their suggestion. Gibb-Carsley said the CBSA had "legitimate purpose" to bag them.

==== Allegations of extradition law violations ====
The defence attorney for Meng Wanzhou asserted that the arresting RCMP officers had violated Canadian extradition laws by allegedly sharing information with the FBI. On October 3, 2019, the defence asserted that an RCMP officer's notes say a staff sergeant emailed to the FBI the serial numbers, SIM card numbers, and international mobile equipment identity (IMEI) numbers of Meng's devices. An email between two RCMP officers on December 4 references sending serial numbers and other information about Meng's devices to a "legat," an FBI legal attaché office outside the US. Crown lawyer Robert Frater produced two emails by the staff sergeant saying he did not provide the information to the FBI, and offered to produce documents from five other RCMP officers on the topic. Crown lawyer Robert Frater filed an application to remove a report, written by a technology expert, from the abuse of process proceedings expected to begin in March 2021. The report details how an electronic device's serial number can be used to obtain information on its individual user.

All affidavits from six police officers claim they did not share the electronic identifying numbers of Meng's devices. However, Staff Sergeant Peter Lea, now retired, did discuss sharing the information with the FBI's legal attaché, John Sgroi. He said Sgroi would first have to make a formal request under the Canada-U.S. Legal Assistance Treaty. A note made by Sergeant Janice Vander Graaf also said that "Constable Gurvinder Dhaliwal told her that Staff Sergeant Ben Chang provided the [electronic serial number] information to FBI Legat Sgroi." Vander Graaf admits she wrote the note but asserts that she has "no independent knowledge or recollection" of the information that her notes indicated the other officer had given her. Dhaliwal says he does not recall anyone telling him technical information had been shared or sharing such information with Vander Graaf. A search of Chang's RCMP external email log shows that on December 2, 2018, an email titled "Re: Arrest at YVR" was sent to Sherri Onks of the FBI. An RCMP officer tasked with searching Chang's emails to Onks writes that Chang's email account was deleted when he retired in July 2019. Meng's defence questioned why neither Vander Graaf or Dhaliwal could recall their conversation and asked for more documents to be released due to inconsistencies in the RCMP's emails and notes. Associate Chief Justice Heather Holmes granted the defence's request for the release of more documents, citing "notable gaps" in the evidence provided by the attorney general, which was "strategic in its character yet impoverished in its substance." The disclosure of documents is not required by the order.

==== RCMP and CBSA testimonies ====
Court hearings on the RCMP began on October 26. Constable Winston Yep, the RCMP officer who arrested Meng, said there was nothing unusual about the arrest. According to Yep, he did not board the plane to arrest Meng because the airport was within the CBSA's jurisdiction, so it was decided that the CBSA would do its work first. Yep said “there was no concern” about this process and added that other passengers on the plane created a potential risk of violence should the arrest occur on the airplane. Yep said that safety concerns and "what she was capable of", that she might "put up a fight", aided in deciding not to arrest her on the plane. He understood the arrest warrant's direction to arrest her immediately "as soon as practical," which meant taking into account police safety, such as the possibility that Meng had bodyguards since the FBI said she was travelling with a female companion. When asked if this was just something that "popped into your head today?” by defence lawyer Peck, Yep responded: "You can never assume; there could be another person. It's just like somebody with a knife. You can't assume a person has only one knife. They might have two. Maybe three. You have to always be on guard.” However, one of Yep's superior's emails to another officer described "no officer safety concerns" prior to the arrest. Yep responded saying he cannot know why he wrote that or what he meant by it. Staff Sergeant Peter Lea's email described the RCMP boarding the plane to arrest Meng, which Yep said was a suggestion. The defence said he could have easily arrested Meng once she got off the plane, or during the 13 minute window when she was waiting in a screening room, but Yep disagreed, saying that it was the CBSA's jurisdiction and safety had to be taken into account. He did not think the three-hour delay was unreasonable. When asked if his supervisor was concerned about the CBSA investigating before the RCMP, Yep said no, adding that his supervisor's concern was that Meng would elude the CBSA and escape the airport. Yep did not inform the Department of Justice of the CBSA questioning. Peck said the concern about violence was disingenuous and described Yep's notes from the day as "very sparse". Nowhere in his notes did he write down his concerns about safety. Yep admitted he failed to correct an affidavit prepared for him to sign, which said that Meng had no ties to Canada, after he learned that she had two homes in Canada.

CBSA officer Scott Kirkland admitted he had concerns about the impact of delaying Meng's rights and that possible Charter right issues might come up at court, but said that "we also have a job to do." However, he did not raise issues about the Charter nor did anyone among the RCMP and CBSA. According to Kirkland, section 107 of the Customs Act was brought up in a meeting prior to Meng's plane landing, in the context of how the RCMP could legally obtain information from the CBSA's examination, should they obtain information worth sharing. Kirkland claims he did not lead Meng to believe she was required to share the passcodes to her phone. He said Meng asked why he needed them and he explained that they were needed for the customs and immigration examination at Vancouver's airport. Kirkland said, "I did not say she had no choice." Kirkland had Meng's phones put in clear bags provided by the FBI and placed the paper with her phone's passcodes alongside her electronic devices. According to the Crown, they were later passed to the RCMP by mistake. Kirkland said he would have taken them back if he could and that it was a Privacy Act violation. He denied that the error was only discovered after inquiries were made in January, but acknowledged that he did not add his mistaken sharing of the passcodes when he wrote a new statutory declaration on December 20, correcting some of the time codes he had provided earlier as part of his notes.

Bryce McRae, a superintendent of the CBSA, received a one to two minute phone call from the FBI that was described as out of the ordinary. The FBI employee asked for the phone number of the supervisor on duty. McRae responded that he would be on duty and gave the employee his number. According to McRae, he attempted to determine if Meng was a permanent resident of Canada on December 1, 2018. He could not determine the subject's status and sought help from Ottawa. An internal CBSA email from June 28, 2018, which does not mention McRae, determined that Meng was a permanent resident since her surrender of PR status in 2002 occurred under redundant rules, and was therefore not legally valid. McRae said he contacted the border agency's national security unit for guidance on questioning Meng and the specialist suggested asking if she had homes around the world. The defence asked if there was an explanation for why this question was asked, and McRae responded no. The defence accused McRae's testimony on the specialist's advice of being a fabrication, suggesting that the specialist instead told him to stop the examination.

Superintendent Sanjit Dhillon, one of the officers who questioned Meng, claims he learned about controversies surrounding espionage and sanctions allegations prior to Meng's arrival by conducting an open source search. The open source was Huawei's Wikipedia page. Dhillon asked Meng why Huawei did not sell its products in the U.S., which Meng said she did not know. He told her he found that hard to believe and she responded that it was due to security reasons. Dhillon also asked Meng questions about Huawei's activities in Iran. The defence accused Dhillon of falsifying his report, pointing out that he did not ask Meng about controversies surrounding other countries on the Wikipedia page such as North Korea, Venezuela and Syria. Dhillon also did not ask questions specifically about doing espionage in Canada and only asked about Huawei's activities in the U.S. and Iran. According to Dhillon, he never directly questioned Meng about the extradition arrest warrant or the U.S. charges, but said he would have gotten to it if the interview had lasted longer. Instead, an officer told him the examination was over and Meng was arrested.

Sowmith Katragadda told his superiors he was ready to adjourn the exam after conducting a basic customs and immigration exam, which included examining Meng's luggage and asking questions about her plans in Canada. His superiors wanted to consult with CBSA's national security unit first, which caused delay because it was difficult to reach them. His superiors then shared the questions from the unit to Katragadda. Katragadda said he does not recall what the exact questions were but that he relayed the answers to his CBSA supervisor; however, the defence pointed out that the timeline did not match up. Katragadda's notes say he asked Meng extra questions at 1:09 pm while his superior, Bryce McRae, wrote that he only reached the security unit at 1:35 pm. The defence accused Katragadda of falsifying the account. He then radioed Kirkland and asked him to obtain Meng's passcodes. Katragadda said that he does not recall who came up with the idea to take the passcodes and that it was "absolutely not" his intention that the police later obtained them. Katragadda said that in deciding to take Meng's cellphones, they would have been used for immigration assessment, but admitted that the RCMP and FBI request for the devices was part of the reason. Katragadda admitted that he did not take notes of the meeting with police the morning of the arrest, the collection of electronic devices, potential threats to national security, or that the RCMP was waiting to arrest Meng after his examination was complete. He denied that these were intentional omissions or that they were a concern to higher officials.

Constable Gurvinder Dhaliwal, the RCMP officer who took Meng's electronic devices into police custody, said he did not share technical information about the devices with the FBI or recall ever saying his colleagues did. He denied telling any of his colleagues the information had been sent to the FBI. He said that he recorded the technical details and sent them to the RCMP's file co-ordinator and no one else. Notes by Dhaliwal's superior, Sergeant Janice Vander Graaf, in December 2018 say that Dhaliwal told Graaf that Sergeant Ben Chang provided the FBI with the electronic serial numbers of the devices. Dhaliwal also contradicted CBSA officer Scott Kirkland, who said that he left a scrap of paper with Meng's passcodes with her luggage and it mistakenly ended up in RCMP custody. According to Dhaliwal, the officer handed him the paper with the codes. Dhaliwal said he did not take the time to read the exact wording of the one-page document for Meng's arrest. He said his partner was in charge of making the arrest while he was responsible for the electronic devices. Dhaliwal said he could not see why Meng could not have been arrested as she walked off the plane and had the CBSA examination once she had been cautioned of her rights.

Ben Chang, a retired RCMP staff sergeant involved in email conversations with Sherri Onks, the legal attaché in Vancouver for the FBI, refused to testify at Meng's extradition hearing after seeking council from a lawyer. According to RCMP staff sergeant Janelle Shoihet, Ben Chang was not legally required to attend the proceedings. In an affidavit, Chang said he believes the FBI requested "identifying information from the electronic devices seized from Ms Meng" but also added that "[as] I was never asked for the identifying information by [any] member of the FBI, or any other member of any other United States authorities, this information was never shared." The defence called this a "boilerplate denial" and said Chang never explained where his initial belief in the FBI request came from. Chang also received a call from a "Chinese minister" following Meng's arrest, according to the defence. On June 5, the Justice Department asserted various privileges over documents it was refusing to hand over, including a document described as "Summary/Notes of phone call between Kerry Swift and Ben Chang." Swift is a Justice Department colleague of John Gibb-Carsley, a Justice Department lawyer. The "specified public interest" reason for the refusal to turn over the notes of Chang's conversation with Swift was "Witness safety." The government agreed to turn over the Chang-Swift documents to the defence, however they are withheld from the public and media. Chang now works at Galaxy Macau, a casino and luxury hotel. Former deputy RCMP commissioner Pierre-Yves Bourduas said it was highly unusual for a former Mountie to refuse to testify and suggested it may have to do with his new job and pressure from China. Two of Chang's former colleagues said they were baffled by Chang's refusal to testify. They have chosen to remain anonymous. One of Chang's former superior officers said former Chinese security officials approached Chang after Meng's arrest and sought information on who might be involved in the arrest as well as security details. Jayson Allen, an RCMP IT worker, was tasked with searching through Ben Chang's police emails. He found an email by Chang sent to "fbi.gov", but could not be sure if Chang sent other emails to the FBI by addressing the recipients in the “BCC” (blind carbon copy) field. He also did not search Chang's private Gmail account.

According to Sergeant Janice Vander Graaf, the original plan was to arrest Meng on the plane as discussed with her supervisor, acting Inspector Peter Lea. Her officers agreed instead to intercept her once she got off the plane and then take her to an immigration admissibility examination. Vander Graaf thought this was a reasonable and safe course of action. She described Lea's idea to arrest Meng on the plane as a "strong" suggestion. When questioned why the original plan was not executed, Vander Graaf said there were safety concerns. Vander Graaf read the arrest warrant the morning it occurred and understood the "immediate" part of the arrest to be "as soon as practicable." Vander Graaf said that emails from Dhaliwal were inconsistent with what was initially told to her, that Chang had shared electronic device information with the FBI, and she understood the emails to mean that Chang would go through legal channels for authorization of sharing the devices with U.S. officials. Vander Graaf described a conversation she had with Dhaliwal that Chang had sent the electronic device information to the FBI. The defence questioned why her affidavit in 2019 said she had "no independent recollection" of the conversation or the email, but she does now. The defence accused her of covering for Dhaliwal and Chang.

Sergeant Ross Lundie testified that the arresting officers phoned him the night before to ask for advice, and that's when he heard of the plan to arrest Meng on the plane. The defence suggested that this was impossible since Vander Graaf phoned them later that night after speaking with her own superior, who was the source of the plan to arrest Meng on the plane. Phone records show Lundie had a three-minute call with a national security Mountie in Ottawa that night, but Lundie said he has no memory of the call. He also received a call from the FBI asking him to provide information on the handling of Meng's case, which he said he rejected. Lundie said that Meng posed no risk according to his knowledge, but planes are tight spaces and could be dangerous. Lundie said he took no notes because he was at dinner and that he wish he had. Lundie overheard an officer talking to CBSA about passwords, which he thought did not make sense, and he had "no idea why passcodes to phones and all that would be obtained by anybody."

Nicole Goodman, the CBSA Vancouver airport chief, testified that she remembered the reaction Kirkland had when he realized he did not know where the paper with Meng's password was. According to Goodman, it was an honest mistake. In the days following Meng's arrest, the FBI contacted her seeking records of Meng's customs examination and travel records prior to the bail hearing. She claims the FBI legal attache, John Sgroi, was very persistent and called her multiple times for the results of the customs examination and Meng's travel records. The FBI legal attaché claimed he had authority under a memorandum of understanding that governs information sharing between agencies. Goodman said she needed to check with the CBSA and worried that he would get the information elsewhere. In a correspondence with a senior RCMP officer, Sgroi said he got the information he needed from the CBSA. According to Goodman, she wanted to create a summary of events and "lessons learned" in the agency's role in the arrest, but CBSA's then-director general for the Pacific Region, Roslyn MacVicar, warned her not to. There was a discussion that it was a bad idea because evidence would be used in court. No physical notes of her involvement in the Meng case exist. Goodman said she found interactions involving the CBSA, RCMP and FBI to be routine, so she did not take any notes. The defence asked if it was routine for the FBI to try to coordinate the Richmond RCMP detachment and the RCMP's Federal and Serious Organised Crime unit. Goodman answered that the RCMP was not her concern. On December 10, 2020, it was revealed that Goodman breached the judge's instructions not to discuss her testimony with anyone by approaching a government lawyer with questions about her testimony. Goodman admitted that she had given incomplete evidence in her previous testimony and worried that it had involved privileged information. The defence asked Goodman if her testimony had been “incomplete to the point you have misled”, but the Crown objected to the line of questioning based on "litigation privilege".

Roslyn MacVicar, former Pacific chief of the CBSA, denied that she instructed her staff on the Meng case not to create notes out of fear that they would be disclosed. The defence pointed to notes by a CBSA aide in a meeting about Meng, attended by MacVicar in Ottawa on January 7, 2019, which said “Start gathering but don't create.” MacVicar said she "would never say that... and it's inconsistent with anything I’ve ever said in my capacity as a public servant." A statement of facts on December 14, 2020, including recollections of the CBSA's director of operations at Vancouver's airport, John Linde, contradicted MacVicar. According to Linde, MacVicar mentioned at a meeting not to create additional notes, which may have to do with access to information (ATIP) requests. Linde assumed the comment was directed at Goodman, who was more involved in the Meng case. The defence questioned her about an email she wrote in response to questions by CBSA bosses in Ottawa, about how the CBSA knew Meng was on her way to Canada, and why one of her officers asked Meng about Huawei's business in Iran. MacVicar said she composed the email after receiving information from senior CBSA staff at the airport, but she had no record of how this was conveyed to her.

=== Double criminality ===
On January 10, 2020, Canadian Crown prosecutors argued that the court did not need to consider U.S. sanctions law because Meng's conduct amounts to fraud under Canadian law. Earlier in November, Meng's defence argued that Meng could not be extradited because her conduct was not illegal in Canada, since Canada did not have the same sanctions against Iran at the time Canadian officials authorized the extradition proceedings. According to the defence, this is "a case of U.S. sanctions enforcement masquerading as Canadian fraud," and not only are banks in Canada allowed to do business with Iran-based entities, they are encouraged to do so.

On January 20, 2020, Meng's extradition hearing began. Justice Heather Holmes asked the defence if domestic prosecution would be viable had Meng's alleged conduct occurred in Canada. Meng's defence answered no, because the bank would face no liability for the alleged fraud. Holmes questioned whether or not all financial loss to the bank must occur in Canada for the fraud to be prosecuted and suggested that the bank may suffer reputational risk regardless of the location. According to the attorney general, the matter is not complex; lying to a bank is fraud. Crown counsel Robert Frater argued that sanctions law need not be considered to understand the reputational risk Meng's conduct posed to HSBC. However, defence lawyer Scott Fenton countered, stating that "there must be actual risk posed to the economic interests of the victim" in a fraud case. He took issue with Frater's argument and called it an "oxymoron" as "No possibility of risk means no loss at all." Meng's lawyer Richard Peck also invoked Canada's status as a sovereign state to reject what he considered the attempted application of U.S. laws to Meng's case.

On May 27, 2020, Justice Heather Holmes ruled that the requirement of double criminality is capable of being met under both Canadian and US criminal law statutes.

=== Restricted documents ===
Canadian officials have asked court to prevent Meng's legal team from disclosing a document that contains "sensitive information that would injure national security if disclosed."

==== U.S. documents ====
The U.S. government has asked court to limit Huawei's ability to share information gained in their court cases in the U.S. with Meng. US prosecutors handling Meng's case said Huawei should not be allowed to share evidence with Meng Wanzhou because the evidence would be misused.

Huawei is suing multiple U.S. government agencies for the release of documents relevant to Meng's case. Huawei made 12 requests more than a year ago under the U.S. Freedom of Information Act and received almost nothing back, despite "express requirement that agencies generally must act within 20 business days."

U.S. prosecutors accused Huawei of improperly sharing information disclosed against the company with Meng. U.S. District Judge Ann Donnelly found that this did not violate court order, but warned Huawei lawyers to be careful with their filings.

==== CSIS and FBI involvement ====
Around 2013, border agents at John F. Kennedy International Airport searched Meng's electronics during transit and recovered a text file of her talking points on Iran. Federal investigators later probed the issue in 2017–2018 in secret and kept it under seal until Meng landed in Canada.

A redacted two-page CSIS report was released on June 12, 2020, which revealed Canadian Security Intelligence Service and FBI involvement in Meng's arrest. According to the document, the CSIS received notice of the issued arrest warrant from the FBI a day before Meng's arrest. The CSIS report notes that the RCMP FPNS (federal policing national security unit) considered the arrest to be "highly political" in nature and "the arrest is likely to send shockwaves around the world." The CSIS expected Meng to be arrested at 4 PM even though her plane landed at 11:30 AM. According to Meng's lawyers, this shows that the CSIS was aware of the planned multi-hour delay during which Meng was questioned, had her devices taken from her before she was informed of her arrest, and her charter rights were violated. The CSIS report also says the RCMP would likely receive assistance from the CBSA in arresting Meng, which Meng's lawyers argue is evidence of collusion because it is not part of the border service's mandate to provide the RCMP with assistance in gathering evidence. The CSIS also noted that the FBI would not be present in an effort to avoid the "perception of involvement." CSIS spokesman John Townsend said in an email that he is unable to comment on the specifics of the proceedings, as the matter is before the court. The redacted report is part of an application for a representative to participate in proceedings behind closed doors on secret documents that would, according to the attorney general, hurt international relations, national defence or national security. The lawyer Anil Kapoor will have access to further confidential information but cannot share contents with Meng and her team. The court ordered the Crown to release 400 documents (1,200 to 1,500 pages) in February, however, the Crown wishes to redact all or half of them. Information included in the documents state that the FBI requested the RCMP to monitor Meng should she be released on bail, and in response the RCMP said that they would not be able to provide 24/7 surveillance.

Global Affairs Canada official David Hartman and CSIS officer Michel Guay both filed affidavits arguing that Meng's lawyers should not get access to the unredacted documents. The reason being that it would cause further damage to China-Canada relations should the content be revealed. According to Guy, the redacted material might also negatively impact national security by identifying informants and relationships with other intelligence agencies.

On August 21, Judge Catherine Kane deemed the CSIS documents irrelevant to Meng's case and refused Meng's request for their release, but added that even if they had been relevant, she would likely still have refused to order their release due to their injurious nature.

On October 9, 2020, Meng's team was denied access to most of the documents they requested due to issues related to solicitor-client privilege.

=== Allegation of misrepresentation ===
Meng accused the U.S. of misrepresenting her case by omitting key information in the evidence filed against her. The team alleged that the PowerPoint deck presented by the US prosecutors was incomplete and the omitted slides would have shown “highly relevant information” and that she had been transparent with HSBC. According to her legal team, the U.S. omitted slides No.6 and No.16 of the PowerPoint used as evidence against Meng, which show she was far more transparent to HSBC than suggested. The slides contain a statement that Huawei worked with Skycom in Iran and that they had normal and controllable business cooperation with each other. And that leaving out the slides, leaves the impression that the tech executive had never disclosed to HSBC that Skycom did business with Huawei in Iran, or that Huawei and Skycom had an ongoing business relationship. HSBC documents revealed that an HSBC employee said that Huawei had tried to comply with all sanctions and that he was "pretty much reassured on the issue." The documents make clear that "HSBC Witness B," a managing director, and "HSBC Employee 7", HSBC's deputy head of global banking in China, had been aware of the relationship between Huawei and Skycom for quite some time before Witness B met Meng in 2013. Employee 7 signed off on four favourable risk assessment reports that were accepted by committees weighing the bank's relationship with Huawei. Associate Chief Justice Heather Holmes ruled that these documents cannot be used in the extradition case.

The new court filings contend that since HSBC was aware that Huawei and Skycom were operating in Iran, they would have known they could not process Skycom funds through U.S. banks without violating U.S. sanctions law. Additionally, Meng's legal team argued there was no need to clear U.S. dollar transactions through U.S. banks as HSBC could have used the Clearing House Automated Transfer System (CHATS) in Hong Kong for clearing Skycom transactions, which would not have involved risk of violating U.S. sanctions law.

On 28 October 2020, a ruling was published online in which Holmes ruled that there was an “air of reality" to Meng's allegations of abuse of process in regards to US Department of Justice's conduct and that she would allow two statements from the missing PowerPoint slides to be used as evidence in the extradition case.

New evidence filed by Meng's lawyers include an affidavit from John Bellinger, a former senior associate counsel to the George W. Bush White House, saying that "Any assertion that Ms. Meng would have put the bank in legal jeopardy ... is not supported by past U.S. government practice." According to Bellinger, the U.S. record of the case for prosecution left out the fact that Meng clearly stated to the bank that Huawei worked with Skycom in Iran, and that HSBC was processing Skycom transactions through the U.S. for three years prior to the meeting with Meng. Crown lawyers responded that Associate Chief Justice Heather Holmes has the responsibility to "keep these proceedings on the straight and narrow" and to "stop this application here and now." In October 2020, a judge blocked an attempt by Canada's attorney general to dismiss parts of the extradition case, allowing arguments for the misrepresentation of Meng's case to move forward.

=== Allegation of international law violation ===
Meng's lawyers claimed that Canada would be complicit in breaching international law if it sent Meng to the U.S. due to extraterritorial actions.

=== Allegation of fabricated testimonies by CBSA ===
The defence accused CBSA officer Scott Kirkland of completely fabricating his testimony in October 2020, when he said the passcodes to Meng's electronic devices accidentally ended up in RCMP possession. Tony Paisana noted that nowhere is the mistake recorded by the CBSA. Another lawyer, Mona Duckett, described the Canadian officers' testimonies as reckless and deliberately false. For example, it was beyond conceivable that officers would “single-handedly” discover evidence of espionage by Meng. The defence accused the border agents of violations including the seizure of Meng's electronic devices, compelling her to turn over their passcodes, and questioning her about Huawei's activities in relation to US fraud charges against her. The defence also characterized the CBSA's questions for Meng as being irrelevant to Canada and only valuable to a US audience, while Constable Winston Yep's testimony that he had safety concerns about arresting Meng on the plane was completely made up. The Crown responded that border officers had legitimate interest in conducting the examination because of concerns about Canadian security and possible criminality.

The defence challenged Staff Sgt. Ben Chang's written claims that he did not share information taken from her electronic devices with the FBI. Chang has since retired from the RCMP, after which all his emails and texts were destroyed, and now lives in Macau. He refused to testify and has hired a lawyer. The Crown said it was up to the defence to compel Chang to testify and said they did not because his testimony would hurt their case.

=== Judicial Comment ===
On 12 August 2021, Associate Chief Justice Heather Holmes, presiding over the extradition proceedings, posed the question, "Isn't it unusual that one would see a fraud case with no actual harm many years later and one in which the alleged victim, a large institution, appears to have numerous people within the institution who had all that facts that are now said to have been misrepresented?" Holmes also had difficulty understanding U.S. explanations for what constituted business that did or did not comply with sanctions on Iran. The records provided by the prosecution did not define legal commercial activity in Iran. The prosecution explained that there was good and bad business as far as the U.S. sanctions law was concerned and that it was Meng's job to know the difference. The prosecution suggested that Meng implied to HSBC that she knew where the line was and that HSBC would be safe from crossing it. On 13 August 2021, Associate Chief Justice Heather Holmes expressed great difficulty in understanding how the Record of Case (ROC) presented by the US to the Canadian authorities in support of their extradition request showed a clear factual or contextual basis to support their allegation of criminality.

== Deal with U.S. prosecutors and release ==
In December 2020, The Wall Street Journal reported, relying on unnamed sources, that the United States Department of Justice was talking to Meng's representatives about a possible deferred prosecution deal, where she will be set free if she admits to criminal wrongdoing.

On 18 September 2021, the Globe and Mail, citing Canadian sources, reported that the United States Department of Justice had been in a talk with Huawei and Meng's lawyers for weeks, and had made an offer to end the extradition request and criminal proceedings if Meng both pleaded "guilty" to the charges and paid a hefty fine.

On 24 September 2021, the Department of Justice under President Joe Biden announced it had suspended its charges and withdrew its extradition request against Meng Wanzhou after she entered into a deferred prosecution agreement with them, in which she conceded she helped misrepresent the relationship between Huawei and its subsidiary Skycom to HSBC in order to transact business with Iran, but was allowed to not enter a guilty plea to the fraud charges nor have to pay a fine. Meng left Canada on 24 September 2021.

On December 2, 2022, the presiding judge dismissed the charges against Meng following the United States government's request.

== Repatriation ==
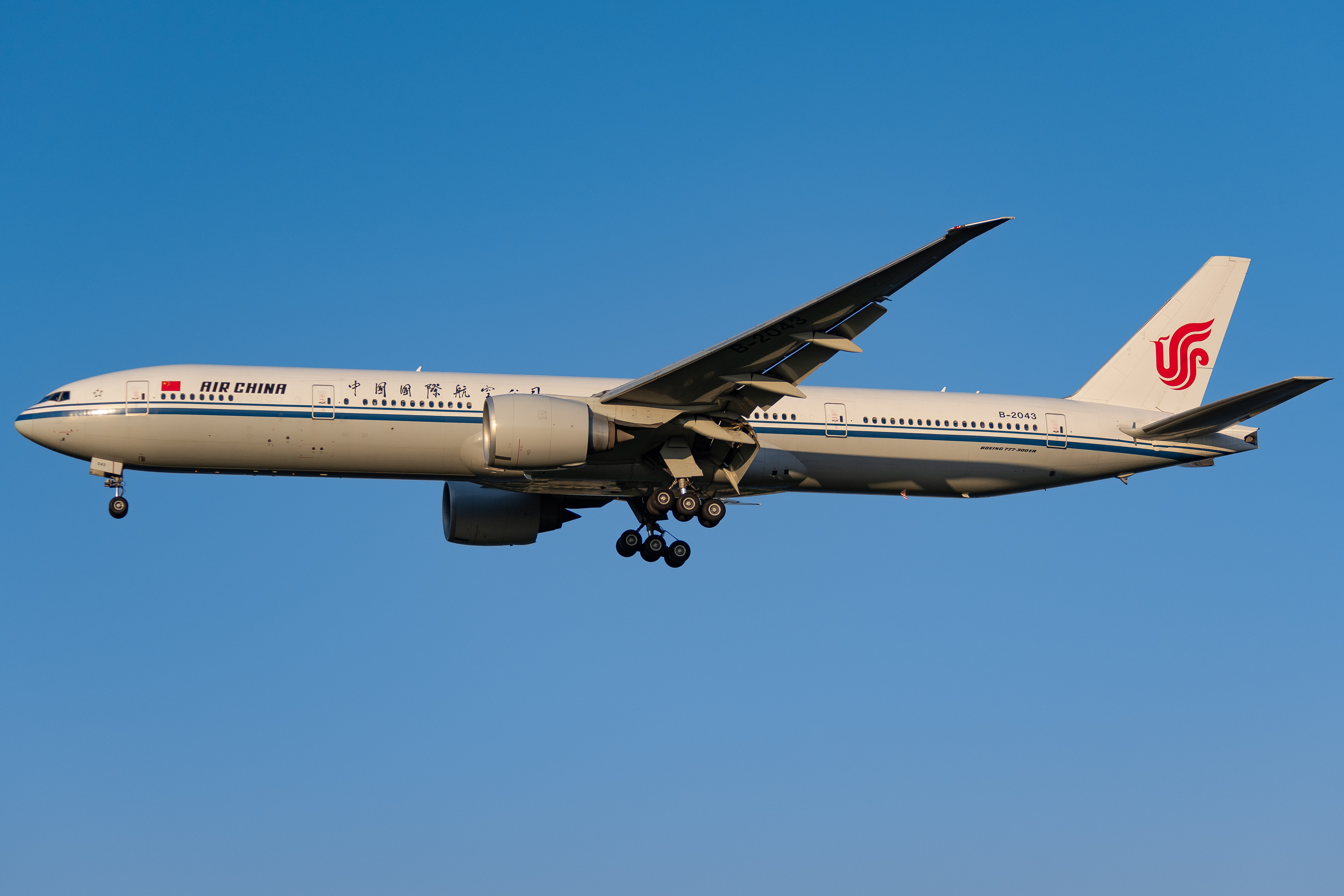
The aircraft used in Meng's repatriation pictured in July 2020

On 24 September 2021, Chinese ambassador to Canada Cong Peiwu and staff from the Chinese embassy accompanied Meng to Vancouver International Airport to send her off where she departed aboard a Chinese government-arranged Air China charter flight bound for Shenzhen, Guangdong, China after spending more than 1,000 days under house arrest in the city as part of her bail condition.

She arrived and was greeted with a hero's welcome at the Shenzhen Bao'an International Airport the following day on 25 September 2021. Meng gave a speech thanking the leadership of the Chinese Communist Party for its leadership and the "strong motherland". She stated, "[W]here there is a Chinese flag, there is a beacon of faith. If faith has a color, it must be China Red." This statement became a popular slogan.

== Reactions to arrest ==
=== Domestic ===
Canadian Prime Minister Justin Trudeau said that the federal government was aware of the intended arrest, but had no involvement in the process due to the judicial independence of the Public Prosecution Service of Canada. According to David MacNaughton, Canada's former ambassador to the United States, the extradition request was made very suddenly on November 30, with no discussion between U.S. and Canadian officials. However, MacNaughton also says the U.S. has several agendas in going after Huawei, one of which is that it wants its allies to ban it. A close adviser of Justin Trudeau says the view inside the Canadian government is that John Bolton was the driving force behind the arrest of Meng. Trudeau was informed of Meng's arrest at the G20 summit in Buenos Aires, and according to one source, was caught off guard.

Canada's Minister of Foreign Affairs, Chrystia Freeland, rejected China's demand that the Canadian Government should block the extradition, despite China's decision to block imports of Canadian canola seed (an important foreign export revenue earner), and warned Beijing that "It would be a very dangerous precedent indeed for Canada to alter its behavior when it comes to honouring an extradition treaty in response to external pressure." She added that to do so could make Canadians around the world less safe.

Canada's Ambassador to China, John McCallum said, "From Canada's point of view, if (the U.S.) drops the extradition request, that would be great for Canada." On January 26, 2019, McCallum resigned as Canada's ambassador to China at the request of Prime Minister Justin Trudeau.

In January 2020, protesters outside the court demanding justice for Meng were revealed to have been paid by unknown sources. Some stated that they were actors and had been told they would be background extras.

Canada's Minister of Public Safety and Emergency Preparedness, Ralph Goodale, says the arrests of Canadians in China are an "arbitrary action", and that Canada will continue to demand that the detainees are treated fairly. Goodale says that China has produced no evidence to indicate any validity to the criminal allegations against them. The aforementioned former Canadian ambassador to China, Guy Saint-Jacques, says that leveraging international support for Canada, particularly from the US, will be necessary, that an anticipated Canada–China free trade deal should be taken off the table, that inspections of Chinese goods entering Canada should be increased, and that Canada should lodge a complaint against China at the World Trade Organization (WTO), over its decision to ban the importation of Canadian canola seed.

Following the ruling by the BC Supreme Court, the new Minister of Foreign Affairs, François-Philippe Champagne, stated the government will respect the independence of the judiciary's decision in ordering the extradition to proceed.

Former Prime Minister of Canada, Jean Chrétien, has suggested cancelling Meng's extradition case to unfreeze relations with China. Chrétien has said privately that "the United States played a trick on Canada by forcing Ottawa to arrest Ms. Meng, and called the extradition request an unacceptable move by the United States at the expense of Canada and its farmers and pork producers."

Former Minister of Foreign Affairs, John Manley, has stated that Canadian allies such as Germany have let Canada down in their support of Canada: "Where have the Germans been? Have they said we're not talking to you, China, until you talk to Canada—no. What about our other so-called progressive friends?" According to Manley, the simplest way out of the Meng affair would be for the U.S. to simply withdraw the extradition request. However, Manley believes the key to this is convincing Donald Trump, which is unlikely.

Nineteen prominent former politicians and diplomats signed a letter calling for the release of Meng. Included among them are former Liberal foreign affairs minister Lloyd Axworthy, former Conservative foreign affairs minister Lawrence Cannon, former Conservative senator Hugh Segal, former New Democratic Party leader Ed Broadbent, former Supreme Court justice Louise Arbour, former ambassador to the U.S. Derek Burney. Prime Minister Trudeau rejected the call saying, "We will continue to remain steadfast and strong and say very clearly in our actions and in our words that randomly arresting Canadians doesn't give you leverage over the government of Canada anywhere in the world." Vina Nadjibulla, the wife of Michael Kovrig, who is one of the arrests in China linked to Meng's case, says she fully supports the letter calling for Meng's release in exchange for the Michaels. According to Nadjibulla, the alternative is to essentially let the Michaels stay in jail for many more years.

On 15 July 2020, the Green Party of Canada's foreign affairs critic, Paul Manly, argued that U.S. President Donald Trump's comments made clear that Meng's case is political in nature. According to Manly, the Trump administration abused the extradition treaty for political purposes, and "Canada cannot continue to be used as a pawn in a trade dispute between the United States and China." The Green Party's parliamentary leader, Elizabeth May, also proposed for the "Canadian government to stand up to the U.S. administration and demands that it drops the criminal charges."

On 15 September 2020, over 100 former diplomats called on Prime Minister Justin Trudeau to negotiate a swap of Meng for the Michaels. Aside from Henry Garfield Pardy, former director general of consular affairs, who organized the letter to Trudeau, the ex-diplomats have chosen to remain anonymous.

On 7 October 2020, the Canadian defence minister, Harjit Sajjan, described the detention of the two Michaels as hostage diplomacy.

NDP and Green Party MPs Paul Manly and Niki Ashton spoke in an online panel discussion on 24 November 2020, in favour of releasing Meng in exchange for the Michaels.

Meng Wanzhou received multiple death threats while under house arrest. In June and July 2020, five or six threatening letters, one of which contained bullets, were delivered to her residence.

=== International ===
==== China ====
Four hours after Meng Wanzhou was detained, she called Song Liuping, Huawei's chief legal officer and a member of the board of directors. Song relayed her arrest to Beijing, where Chinese Communist Party general secretary Xi Jinping found out after the post-summit dinner with Donald Trump. According to Chinese and Huawei sources, Xi was furious that he learned of this from his officials rather than the Canadians. A Canadian foreign-affairs official claims the federal government reached out to Chinese diplomats as soon as Meng was arrested, who had consular access to Meng within a few hours. However, the Chinese embassy in Ottawa says they learned of her arrest from Beijing, not from the Canadian government. The Chinese consulate in Vancouver says "it had not been informed by Canadian foreign affairs officials about the arrest of Ms. Meng Wanzhou."

The Chinese embassy in Ottawa issued a strong statement condemning her arrest and the Chinese Foreign Ministry summoned the Canadian and American ambassadors in protest over the detention. Chinese media have alleged that the arrest is part of an attempt by the U.S. to stifle Huawei and its other tech companies. According to David MacNaughton, the Chinese believe the arrest was coordinated at the highest levels by Canadian and U.S. authorities.

On December 9, 2018, the government of China told Canadian ambassador John McCallum that Meng's arrest "severely violated the Chinese citizen's legal and legitimate rights and interests, it is lawless, reasonless and ruthless, and it is extremely vicious" and warned of "serious consequences" unless Meng was released. The subsequent arrest of former diplomat Michael Kovrig in Beijing may be part of those consequences, according to former Canadian ambassador Guy Saint-Jacques. Shortly afterwards, China detained businessman Michael Spavor, another Canadian national, in an escalating diplomatic row. Their arrests were made under the National Security Law that came into effect in 2015, a comprehensive piece of legislation that gives Chinese authorities broad powers. The detention of the Canadians is widely regarded as an act of Hostage diplomacy. The 2019 arrest of Australian Yang Hengjun is seen by many to be a continuation of the hostage diplomacy strategy and to be direct retaliation for the Australian government strongly condemning the arrest of the Canadians.

China's ambassador to Canada, Lu Shaye, wrote in a Hill Times op-ed on January 9, accusing Canada of "Western egotism and white supremacy". He warned on January 17 that he believed there would be "repercussions" from China if Canada were to choose to exclude Huawei from supplying equipment for its future 5G networks.

Global Times editor Hu Xijin denounced Canada's 2018 arrest of Meng Wanzhou and stated, "I want to tell America that while you cannot beat Huawei in the market, do not use despicable means and play dirty."

On November 6, 2019, Geng Shuang, China's Foreign Ministry spokesperson urged the re-elected Canadian government to release Meng Wanzhou to move the bilateral relationship between China and Canada "onto the right track".

Meng Wanzhou's father and Huawei's founder, Ren Zhengfei, says she should be proud to be a bargaining chip between China and the United States. He says the experience of hardship and suffering is good for Meng, who now calls him much more than in the past, when she might not even text him for an entire year. Ren states that when Meng returns to Huawei, she will keep her old job, because the company would lose its competitive edge if led by someone without strategic acumen.

==== United States ====
A White House official stated that "President Donald Trump did not know about a U.S. request for her extradition from Canada before he met Chinese President Xi Jinping and agreed to a 90-day truce in the brewing trade war", while U.S. National Security Advisor John R. Bolton said that he knew in advance of Meng's arrest.

U.S. trade representative Robert Lighthizer said that Meng Wanzhou's arrest was "a criminal justice matter" that should have no impact on the trade talks between both countries, but Trump said he could intervene, in order to get a good trade deal with China. U.S. Secretary of State Mike Pompeo added, foreign policy must be taken into consideration in this case, and the mission is "America First." The remarks were criticized for politicizing the situation. Pompeo later rejected any connection between the arrest of the two Michaels in China and Meng Wanzhou.

The United States House of Representatives passed a bill praising Canada for the detention of Meng Wanzhou.

Former national security adviser to President Donald Trump, John Bolton, said Meng's case is not politically motivated at all and that he would be happy to testify under oath in Canadian court.

==== Legal commentary ====
Criminal defence lawyer Gary Botting, who has provided some legal advice to Meng's defence team, and is one of the country's leading authorities on extradition law, described Meng's extradition case as "silly" and obviously a "political type of enterprise that the United States is engaged in." According to Botting, section 23 of the Extradition Act specifically gives the Minister of Justice and Attorney General of Canada the statutory authority to terminate any extradition case, even though the Attorney General, David Lametti, claimed that to do so would violate the rule of law. Botting says that "It's really silliness for him to say he has to obey the rule of law because it's before the courts. No. What (the law) says is that he can stop the whole process and the courts must comply with whatever he decides." Botting believes Meng should be discharged based on the issue of double criminality which should be a "fairly open and shut case" for her.

According to Joseph Bellinger, a former legal adviser and senior associate counsel to the George W. Bush administration, he is not aware of the U.S. ever having prosecuted someone for the conduct which Meng is being indicted. He further adds that the charges levelled against Meng "go well beyond any set of criminal charges related to violations of U.S. sanctions in Iran of which I am aware."

Eric Lewis, a U.S. lawyer specializing in international fraud and corruption cases, says, "in a case like this one, where Ms. Meng is in all likelihood executing corporate policy, one would expect individuals not to be charged and the corporation would be fined." For example, in June 2018, Ericsson reached a settlement with the U.S. government, agreeing to pay more than US$145,000 for breaching sanctions against Sudan. Lewis speculates that the U.S. picked Canada to arrest Meng and not other countries it has extradition treaties with, because South American countries are more formal and extradition could take longer, and European countries might be less willing to cooperate on prosecutions of a political or strategic character.

On June 23, 2020, former Supreme Court justice Louise Arbour called for the justice minister to end the extradition process, citing Canada's interests and lack of Canadian sanctions on Iran similar to that of the U.S. Former Justice Minister Allan Rock also called for the release of Meng, describing the government's insistence on the rule of law as "formulaic, robotic incantations."

Former Liberal attorney general and justice minister, Anne McLellan, supported Trudeau's position not to release Meng in exchange for the Michaels due to the dangerous precedent that would set for other Canadians. However, Michael Kovrig's wife Vina Nadjibulla disagreed, citing the similar response by China with the detention of the Garratts in 2014.

University of British Columbia political science & international law professor Michael Byers said that it was clear to him the CBSA was asking Meng questions during the three-hour examination based on discussions with American authorities, although he added that "That's not necessarily improper."

According to former San Francisco County Superior Court judge Julie M. Tang, extradition judge Heather Holmes used convoluted and deceptive language so that "it could have gone either way" but "she chose to go down the way to find for extradition."

==== Other commentary ====
Economist Jeffrey Sachs stated that the United States rarely arrests senior businesspeople for their companies' crimes and that "to start this practice with a leading Chinese business person — rather than the dozens of culpable American CEOs and CFEOs — is a stunning provocation to the Chinese government, business community, and public".

== See also ==
- The arrest and imprisonment of Frédéric Pierucci, the former international sales executive of the French multinational manufacturer Alstom, during General Electric's purchase of Alstom's energy sector.
