= Geng Shuang =

Chinese politician

- 耿爽
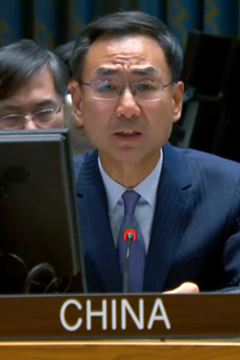
- Geng in 2024

Deputy Permanent Representative of China to the United Nations
- Incumbent
- Assumed office 5 June 2020 Serving with Dai Bing
- Permanent Representative: Zhang Jun; Fu Cong
- Preceded by: Wu Haitao

Deputy Director of the Information Department of the Ministry of Foreign Affairs
- In office September 2016 – 7 July 2020
- Director: Lu Kang; Hua Chunying
- Preceded by: Hong Lei
- Succeeded by: Zhao Lijian

Personal details
- Born: April 1973 (age 53) Beijing, China
- Party: Chinese Communist Party
- Children: 1
- Education: China Foreign Affairs University (BA); Tufts University (MA)

Geng Shuang (Chinese: 耿爽; pinyin: Gěng Shuǎng; born April 1973) is a Chinese politician serving as China's Deputy Permanent Representative to the United Nations. He formerly served as the deputy director of the Information Department of the Ministry of Foreign Affairs.

== Biography ==
Geng was born in Beijing in April 1973. He received a Bachelor of Arts in English language from China Foreign Affairs University in 1995 and a Master of Arts in international relations from Tufts University in 2006.

Beginning in 1995, he served in several posts in the Foreign Ministry, including staff member, secretary, counsellor, and division director.

He was counsellor of the Chinese Embassy in the United States from 2011 to 2015.

In 2015, he returned to Beijing and was appointed the counsellor of the Foreign Ministry's International Economic Division.

He was elevated to deputy director of the Foreign Ministry Information Department in 2016. On September 26, 2016, he became a spokesperson for the Ministry of Foreign Affairs of the People's Republic of China.

During a routine press conference on 5 June 2020, Geng Shuang announced that he would no longer be holding the position of spokesperson for China's Foreign Ministry. He was succeeded by Zhao Lijian. On July 7, he presented his credentials to the United Nations Secretariat as China's new Deputy Permanent Representative and Ambassador.

Geng's assertive style resulted in popularity among some Chinese internet users who characterise Geng among as one of the "Super Band of Chinese Diplomats".

== Business ==
On May 31, 2019, Geng Shuang issued a statement to Canada: "We hope that the Canadian side can have a clear understanding of the consequences of endangering itself for the gains of the U.S. and take immediate actions to correct its mistakes so as to spare itself the suffering from growing damage." The statement was in response to China's detention of Michael Kovrig and Michael Spavor in response to the house arrest and extradition case of China-based Huawei's Chief Financial Officer, Meng Wanzhou. When publicly asked by the German envoy to the UN security council to release the men being held in prison without trial, Geng expressed his happiness that the envoy was leaving his post.

== Personal life ==
Geng is married and has a daughter.

Government offices
Preceded by Hong Lei	Deputy Director of Foreign Ministry Information Department of the People's Republic of China; 2016–2020	Succeeded by Zhao Lijian
Preceded by Wu Haitao	Deputy Permanent Representative of China to the United Nations; 2020–present	Incumbent
