= Bankrupt (band) =

Hungarian punk rock band

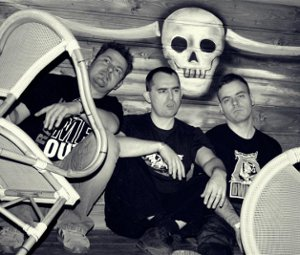
- Bankrupt in December 2011. From left to right: William, Shorty, Rocco

Background information
- Origin: Budapest, Hungary
- Genres: punk rock pop punk punkabilly melodic hardcore
- Years active: 1996–present
- Label: PiaRRecords
- Members: Rocco; William; Shorty
- Past members: Michael K, Crow, Tibor, Black Peter
- Website: http://www.bankrupt.hu

Bankrupt is a Hungarian punk rock band from Budapest, Hungary. They are one of the best-known Hungarian bands outside Hungary in their genre, having received coverage in UK, US, and Canadian online magazines.

Since their formation in 1996, the band has released three albums and three CD-EPs. The title song of one of their most recent releases, Rewound, was played in rotation by Hungarian Radio's music channel MR2 Petőfi and the music video of its Hungarian version "Retro" was played in rotation by MTV Hungary. The band plays melodic punk rock incorporating elements of pop punk, surf rock, britpop, melodic hardcore and punkabilly. They have played about 350 concerts in nine countries, and their releases have been reviewed by various punk rock related publications around the world. The current lineup consists of bassist/vocalist/lyricist Rocco, guitarist/vocalist William, and drummer Shorty.

== History ==
=== Origins ===
The band was formed by Rocco and William in March 1996 in Budapest. The original line-up included Canadian expatriate singer Michael K and drummer Black Peter. Following Michael K's departure in 1999, the vocalist duties were shared by Rocco and William. Present drummer Shorty joined the band in November 2000 after a succession of drummers.

=== Releases and touring ===
The band gained momentum after Shorty had joined the band in November 2000. With their first full-length release Listen under their belts, they started playing concerts more frequently in Hungary, and nearby countries like Austria, the Czech Republic, Germany, Croatia, Slovenia, Italy, Serbia, and Slovakia. Touring highlights included the support slot for the sold out Oct 2004 Budapest gig of veteran English punk rock band Toy Dolls, and several festival appearances. The second album Bad Hair Day came out in December 2004, and it was followed by Shorter Than Danny DeVito in August 2006. Since then they have released three CD-EPs: Rocket To Riot City (2008), Razor Wires And Neon Lights (2009), and Rewound (2011).

=== Recent activity ===
The band contributed tracks to compilation albums released by Cleopatra Records: Punk Rock Halloween - Loud, Fast & Scary (October 13, 2017) and Punk Rock Christmas (October 30, 2015). The band's latest release, the digital-only single, "Come Back Joe Strummer", came out on August 14, 2019.

On July 15, 2021, Bankrupt released the song "Pekingi nyár" (Beijing Summer) and its English-language version "The Plane To Toronto", in protest of the detention of former singer Michael Kovrig. From 1996 to 1999, Kovrig worked as a journalist and editor in Budapest and was the singer of the band. His stage name was Michael K., a reference to Kafka's novel The Trial, which is one of the books he requested when he was granted a virtual visit from the Canadian ambassador while in detention in China. The band announced that all proceeds from the song were to be donated to Hostage International, at the request of Kovrig's family.

== Music style and influences ==
The band's sound is a blend of first wave and contemporary punk rock, and they cite bands like the Ramones, The Clash, the Buzzcocks, The Stranglers, as well as the Descendents, NOFX, and The Dwarves as their main influences. Their lyrics deal with social and political issues as well as less serious subjects, always using an ironic approach.

== Personnel ==
=== Current menbers ===
- Rocco - vocal, bass
- William - vocal, guitar
- Alex - guitar
- Dani - drums

=== Past members ===
- Michael K - vocals
- Crow - drums
- Tibor - drums
- Black Peter - drums
- Shorty - drums
- Salvatore - guitar

== Discography ==
=== Studio albums ===
- Listen (2000)
- Bad Hair Day (2004)
- Shorter Than Danny DeVito (2006)
- Rocket to Riot City (2008)
- Razor Wires and Neon Lights (2009)
- Rewound (2011)
- Goodbye Blue Monday (2013)
- Outsiders (2016)
- Kívülállók (2016) (Outsiders LP with Hungarian lyrics)
- Trolls in Suits (2020)
- Illiberal Holiday (2023)
- Blacklist (2024)
