= Richard Peck (lawyer) =

Richard C.C. Peck, KC (born 1948) is a British Columbia lawyer who has been counsel in many significant criminal cases at all judicial levels including the Supreme Court of Canada and has been appointed by provincial governments to serve as a special prosecutor.

He graduated from the University of British Columbia Faculty of Law in 1974, was called to the Bar of British Columbia in 1975 and is also a former member of the Yukon bar. He was appointed Queen's Counsel in 1987.

He is a founding partner of the Vancouver law firm Peck and Company.

Peck served as a member of the Attorney General's Task Force on Public Legal Services in British Columbia in 1984 and as Special Counsel to B.C. Police Commission for Study and Report to the Attorney General on the Use of Video Equipment by Police Forces in British Columbia in 1986.

== Notable cases ==
In 2001, Peck represented accused child pornographer John Robin Sharpe before the Supreme Court of Canada in R. v. Sharpe. In 2005, he successfully represented accused Air India bombing suspect Ajaib Singh Bagri.

On June 6, 2007, the province of British Columbia announced the appointment of Peck as a special prosecutor to review the results of a police investigation into possible polygamous activity or other offences by members of the community of Bountiful, British Columbia. On August 1, 2007, Peck concluded that there was not enough evidence to charge the group with sexual abuse or exploitation charges as it has been extraordinarily difficult to find victims willing to testify and the defendants are likely to claim "religious freedom" as a defense.

In 2008 and 2009, Peck was retained by the City of Vancouver to review the city's policies and procedures relating to the handling of confidential information following a leak to media prior to the 2008 municipal election regarding a $100 million loan to the builder of the Olympic Village

In 2009, Peck represented lawyer Martin Wirick who was sentenced to seven years in prison for perpetrating what media described as the largest legal fraud in Canadian history.

In 2009, he was appointed special prosecutor by the Ontario Ministry of Attorney General in the case of former Attorney General Michael Bryant who was being charged in the death of cyclist, Darcy Allan Sheppard.

In 2019 he led Meng Wanzhou's defence team during her extradition case.

In 2021, he represented Doug McCallum in his public mischief case, which resulted in a not guilty verdict in November 2022.
