= Michael Kovrig =

Canadian prisoner in China from 2018 to 2021

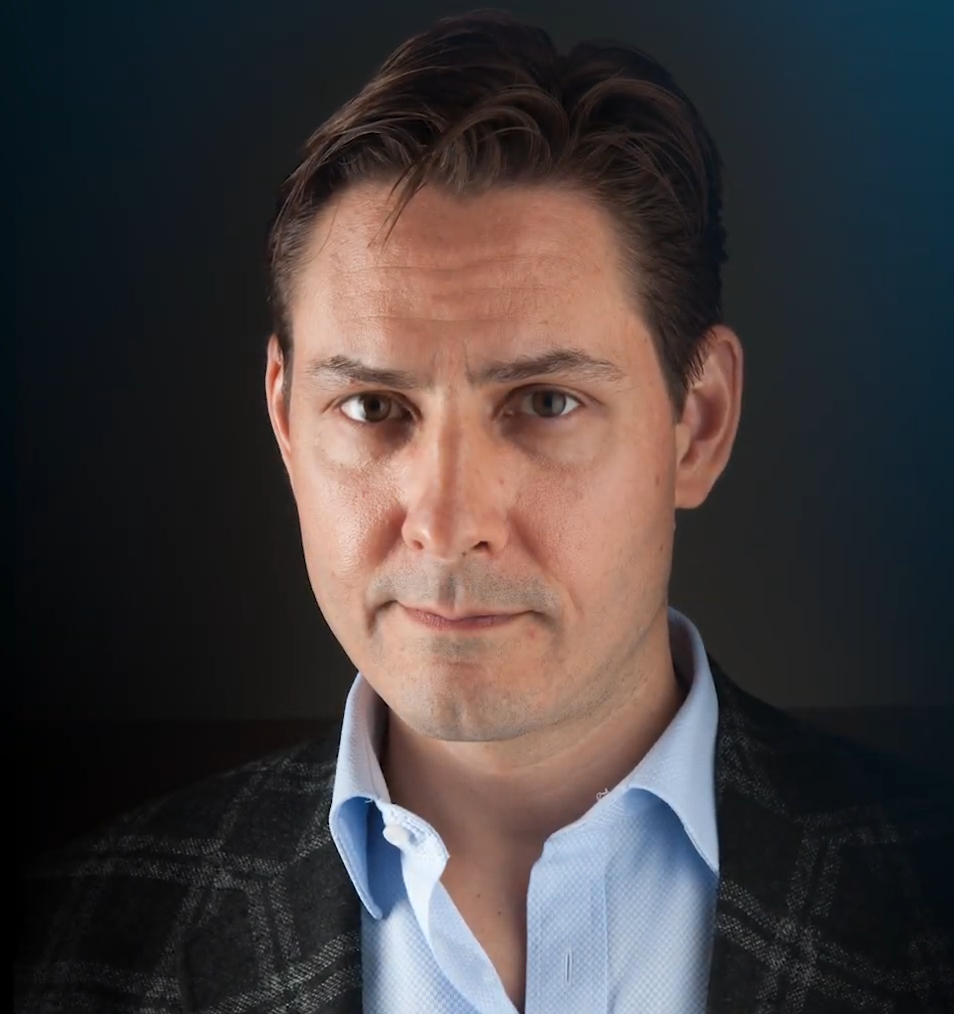
- Kovrig in 2019
- Born: February 3, 1972 (age 54); Toronto, Ontario, Canada
- Education: University of Toronto (BA); Columbia University (MIA)
- Occupations: Geopolitical advisor; writer
- Employer: International Crisis Group
- Known for: Detention in China with Michael Spavor; Former vocalist of Bankrupt

Michael Kovrig (born February 3, 1972) is a Canadian geopolitical advisor, analyst, writer, and former diplomat. In December 2018, he was detained in Beijing by Chinese authorities alongside Michael Spavor and held for 1,019 days on following the arrest of Huawei executive Meng Wanzhou in what was widely considered to be a retaliatory act. On September 24, 2021, Kovrig and Spavor released and returned to Canada after the United States reached a deferred prosecution agreement with Meng. Following their release, Kovrig was alleged to be an intelligence asset for Canada by Spavor and a source for The Globe and Mail. Global Affairs Canada denied that Kovrig was involved in espionage.

Currently, Kovrig works for the International Crisis Group (ICG) as a Senior Advisor specializing in Asia-Pacific affairs and Chinese foreign policy.

== Early life and education ==
Born in Toronto, Canada, Kovrig attended Royal St. George's College and later graduated from the University of Toronto with a Bachelor of Arts in English Literature in 1994. He then attended Columbia University and earned a Master’s in International Affairs in 2003.

== Career ==
After graduating from the University of Toronto, Kovrig lived in Budapest, Hungary in the 1990s, working as an editor for Budapest Week, reporter for the Budapest Business Journal and as a radio news announcer for Magyar Rádió.

From 1996 to 1999, Kovrig was a vocalist in the Hungarian punk rock band Bankrupt. His stage name was Michael K., a reference to Kafka's novel The Trial, which is one of the books he requested when he was granted a virtual visit from the Canadian ambassador while in detention in China.

In 2003, Kovrig began working as a researcher for the firm that later became Rhodium Group. From 2003 to 2007, he worked for the Permanent Mission of Canada to the United Nations as a Media and Communications Officer. He then transitioned to the United Nations Development Programme as a strategic communications specialist for three years, beginning in 2007.

In 2010, he joined the Canadian Foreign Service, and served at Global Affairs Canada’s headquarters in Ottawa as a senior desk officer in the international security branch. Kovrig was posted through Canada’s Global Security Reporting Program (GSRP) as a diplomat to the Embassy of Canada to China from 2014 to 2016, where he served as a First Secretary in the political section. In 2016, he briefly served as Consul at the Consulate General of Canada in Hong Kong.

Since 2017, he has worked for the International Crisis Group, a transnational non-profit focused on preventing and resolving deadly conflict through research and advocacy, as a Senior Adviser.

He has written and advocated on various geopolitical issues, including China’s politics and international relations, the North Korean nuclear crisis, and maritime disputes in the Western Pacific. He is a published contributor to The Globe & Mail, the South China Morning Post, Asia Times, Politico, The Diplomat, Mail & Guardian, and ChinaFile.

In January 2026, Kovrig issued several warnings regarding Prime Minister Mark Carney's diplomatic mission to China. He emphasized the risk of economic coercion and advised Carney to prioritize the release of remaining political prisoners during his meetings with President Xi Jinping.

== Detention in China ==
From December 2018 to September 2021, Kovrig, along with Michael Spavor, was detained by the Beijing State Security Bureau and held prisoner in an attempt to pressure the Government of Canada into releasing the Chief Financial Officer of Huawei, Meng Wanzhou. The Chinese government accused Kovrig of “spying into state secrets and internal information” and put him on trial in March 2021. The proceedings were widely criticized as a show trial, and the court never announced a verdict or sentence for Kovrig.

On July 15, 2021, Bankrupt released the song “Pekingi nyár” (Beijing Summer) and its English-language version “The Plane To Toronto” in protest of his detention. The band announced that all proceeds from the song were to be donated to Hostage International, at the request of Kovrig’s family.

On September 24, 2021, hours after the United States reached a deferred prosecution agreement with Meng and she was released from house arrest in Vancouver, Kovrig was released on bail without being sentenced, deported from China and flown back to Canada.

In a 2024 interview, Kovrig said that he was subjected to “total isolation and relentless interrogation for six to nine hours every day” and “spent his first five months of detainment in solitary confinement with blackout blinds over the windows. Kovrig also stated that “Chinese officials used a ‘whole host of psychological manipulation techniques’ to try to coerce a confession out of him, including cutting his food rations”.

=== Allegations of intelligence sharing ===
According to a report by The Globe and Mail in November 2023, Spavor sought a multimillion-dollar settlement against the federal government for involving him in espionage activities without his knowledge. Spavor alleged that he provided Michael Kovrig with intelligence on North Korea, which Kovrig then secretly gave to the Canadian government and its Five Eyes allies without Spavor's permission, leading to their arrest and detention. According to the report, a "highly placed source" told The Globe that Kovrig was "considered an intelligence asset, as a diplomatic officer at the Global Security Reporting Program (GSRP) within the Canadian embassy in Beijing, and later when based in Hong Kong at International Crisis Group."

A watchdog report criticized the GSRP operating in a "distinctly grey zone", putting its officers and their contacts at risk and might breach global diplomatic conventions.

In December 2023, The Globe and Mail reported that the Canadian government has offered CA$3 million each to Kovrig and Spavor, while Spavor's lawyer is seeking $10.5 million. Spavor reached a $7 million settlement deal with the Canadian government in March 2024.

==== Reactions ====
In a statement, Global Affairs Canada denied that Kovrig was involved in espionage. Kerry Buck, a retired diplomat and senior fellow at the University of Ottawa's Graduate School of Public and International Affairs, also rejected claims of espionage, saying that "GSRP diplomats write diplomatic reports. As with all diplomatic reports, they are read by people in Ottawa, including the CSIS. [...] In no world does this make GSRP diplomats 'spies'."

In response to the report, Chinese foreign ministry spokesperson Wang Wenbin argued that the Canadian position on the Michaels detention being arbitrary had been "debunked by facts over time" and that the allegations were "a complete distortion of facts and blame-shifting".

== Personal life ==
He was previously married to Vina Nadjibulla. Kovrig is fluent in English, French, and Mandarin Chinese.
