= Frédéric Pierucci =

French businessman and author (born 1968)

- Born: 14 January 1968 (age 58)
- Education: ISAE-ENSMA, INSEAD, Columbia University
- Occupation: International sales executive
- Employer: Alstom

Frédéric Pierucci (French pronunciation: [fʁedeʁik pjəʁutʃi]; born 14 January 1968) is a French business manager and a former senior executive for Alstom, who was accused of willful blindness to corporate corruption by the United States Department of Justice and was arrested and detained in the United States from 2013 to 2014. He is the author of the book The American Trap: My Battle to Expose America's Secret Economic War Against the Rest of the World, an autobiography that chronicles his experience throughout the legal ordeal.

Pierucci's judiciary story is considered in France as an example of the hostage diplomacy and economic warfare waged by the United States government, including against its purported allies. Indeed, Pierucci's arrest and imprisonment without bail in a maximum security prison in Rhode Island occurred while the American multinational conglomerate General Electric was negotiating to purchase Alstom's energy section, and he was released within a week of the settlement of the purchase. The resulting transaction gave an American company significant control over France's nuclear reactors and energy security.

== Education and career ==
Pierucci graduated from ISAE-ENSMA and INSEAD, and received an MBA from Columbia University.

During the 2000s, he became marketing and sales director in the boiler division of Alstom, a large French transportation and energy company.

== Imprisonment in the United States ==
Alstom attracted US jurisdiction by virtue of the fact that it was a US "Issuer" (basically, that it had some involvement as an issuer on US securities markets). Pierucci was subject to the Foreign Corrupt Practices Act (FCPA) because he was vice-president of Global Sales at a Connecticut-based subsidiary of Alstom.

In 2010, the DOJ opened an investigation into Alstom's commercial practices, focusing, in particular, on a 2003 deal in Indonesia worth US$118 million. Alstom initially seemed to cooperate with the DOJ proceedings, but later refused to cooperate for several years.

On 13 April 2013, Frédéric Pierucci was arrested and accused of bribery of foreign public officials and conspiracy to bribe. More specifically, he was accused of being instrumental in hiring consultants who were used to channel bribes to members of the Indonesian parliament and to officials of the state-owned electricity company in order to obtain a contract to provide power-related services.

Immediately upon his arrest, he was invited to become an FBI informant inside Alstom, an offer which he refused. He was subsequently kept in custody and denied release on bail.

After pleading guilty to multiple charges on 29 July 2013, he was subsequently fired from Alstom on 20 September 2013.

He spent 14 months in high-security prison facilities while awaiting trial. He was eventually able to secure bail after American friends provided guarantees. In September 2017, a Connecticut court condemned Pierucci to two years and a half in jail, including time spent awaiting trial. He was released in September 2018.

== Aftermath ==
In April 2014, Pierucci learned that the energy section of Alstom was sold to the American company General Electric. This led him to conclude that his arrest, denial of bail, and continued imprisonment were part of a strategy of economic warfare and hostage diplomacy. He described himself as an "economic hostage". He eventually co-wrote a book about his experience, The American Trap. France Inter adapted the book as a radio show and podcast.

The government of France had initially blocked General Electric's acquisition of Alstom. But after Arnaud Montebourg's resignation as Minister of Economy, Industrial Renewal and Digital Affairs, he was replaced by Emmanuel Macron, who relented and approved the sale. Pierucci was released on bail during the same week as the purchase.

Media organisations in France reported that the sequence of events corresponded to a successful use of hostage diplomacy by the United States against France. The satirical French newspaper Le Canard enchaîné asked why the same case was not handled by France's law enforcement authorities, since the criminal acts at issue are also illegal there.

In 2020, Frédéric Pierucci tried to organise French investors to buy back Alstom's former nuclear energy assets from General Electric. Arnaud Montebourg suggests the French government should lead the effort for strategic reasons.

== See also ==
- Extradition case of Meng Wanzhou, a similar arrest of foreign senior manager in Canada requested by extradition law in the United States, on the background of economic warfare by the United States.

== Publications ==
- Pierucci, Frédéric; Aron, Matthieu (2019). The American Trap. London: Hodder & Stoughton. ISBN 978-1-5293-2686-4.
