= Michael Spavor =

Canadian consultant (born 1976)

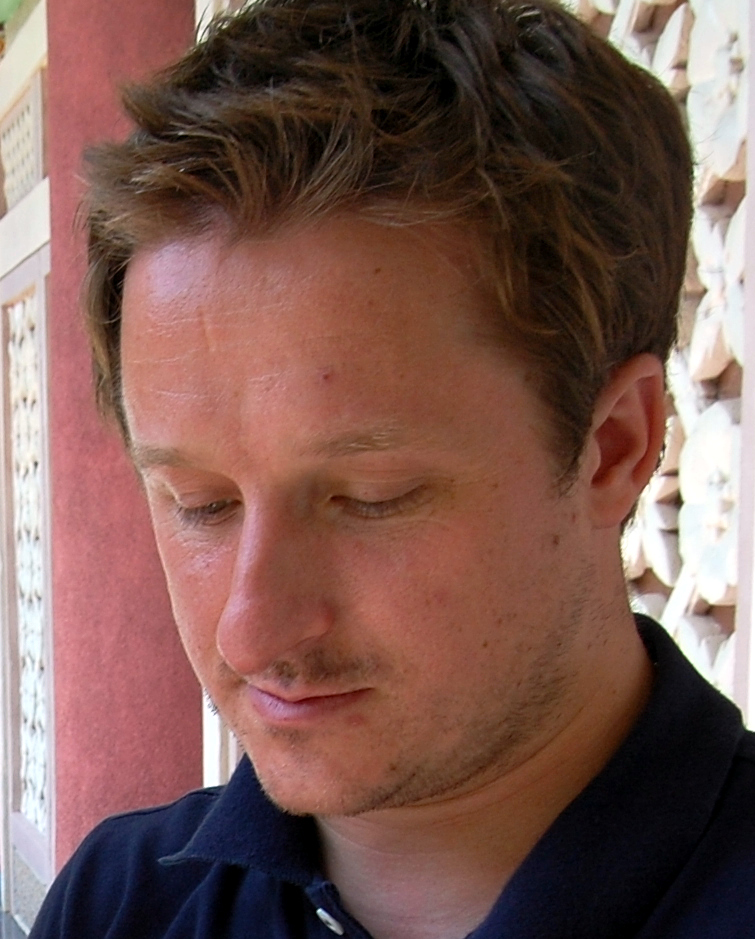
- Spavor in August 2010
- Born: Michael Peter Todd Spavor; 1976 (age 49–50); Toronto, Ontario, Canada
- Occupations: Consultant; director
- Website: paektuculturalexchange.org (until 2020)

Michael Peter Todd Spavor (born 1976) is a Canadian consultant who has worked extensively in North Korea. He is the director and founding member of Paektu Cultural Exchange, an NGO that facilitates sports, cultural, tourism and business exchanges involving North Korea.

In December 2018, while he was living and working in Dandong on the Chinese side of the China–North Korea border, Spavor was taken into custody, along with Michael Kovrig, by Chinese officials. The arrest was widely interpreted as retaliation for Canada's arrest of Huawei executive Meng Wanzhou. On August 10, 2021, Spavor was sentenced to 11 years in prison for espionage. On September 24, 2021, Spavor was released after the dropping of Meng Wanzhou's extradition request as part of her deferred prosecution agreement with the U.S. Department of Justice. Canadian officials initially claimed the espionage charges were "unfounded". However, in 2023, Spavor alleged that he may have unwittingly been used by Michael Kovrig for espionage, saying Kovrig had passed on information relating to North Korea from Spavor to Canadian intelligence agencies. In 2024, Spavor received 7 million dollars from the Canadian government in a settlement over his detention in China.

== Early life and education ==
Michael Spavor was born in Toronto, Ontario. He has a degree from the University of Calgary in international relations, focusing on the Korean Peninsula and East Asian Studies, and has studied International Trade and Political Science at Kangwon National University in South Korea. Spavor is fluent in Korean, including the North Korean dialect, and French.

== Career ==
Spavor's ties with North Korea go back to at least 2001, when he first visited the country. In 2005, he became the managing director of a Vancouver-based NGO and spent six months working as a teacher at an affiliated school in Pyongyang. In the same year, he met American defector James Joseph Dresnok in Pyongyang. Spavor is friends with Kenji Fujimoto, Kim Jong-il's Japanese former sushi chef, whom he first met in Japan in early 2016 and again in April 2016.

In South Korea, Spavor attended Kangwon National University and worked for the Korea Tourism Organization and Seoul Tourism Organization. He also was a council member of the Royal Asiatic Society Korea Branch from 2010 to 2013, giving lectures and leading cultural excursions. He gained attention for restoring and living in a hanok in Bugahyeon-dong in western Seoul, and appeared in a music video for the K-pop group SES.

From 2010 to 2013, Spavor worked for the Pyongyang Project, a Canadian non-profit that organized educational exchanges in North Koreans and provided scholarships for North Korean students overseas, and in 2015 he founded Paektu Cultural Exchange.

Spavor has strong personal ties with North Korean leader Kim Jong-un. In September 2013, Spavor facilitated the second visit of Dennis Rodman to North Korea and became one of the few Westerners to have met Kim while in the city of Wonsan. Spavor later organized Rodman's 2014 visit. Spavor has been involved in the financial development of Wonsan, which is a high priority for Kim Jong-un, who has invested at least $150 million into the city.

In January 2016, Spavor and Paektu Cultural Exchange sought a European Order for Payment against the betting company Paddy Power for failing to fulfill their contractual obligations after they pulled sponsorship for a basketball event to be held in North Korea.

In March 2016, Spavor organized the Pyongyang International Friendship Ice Hockey Exhibition (PIFIHE), bringing around 20 foreign hockey players to North Korea, including two Canadian residents of South Korea, for a series of games and other workshop events.

In 2017, during a qualifying match between the North and South Korean women's ice hockey teams for the 2018 Winter Olympics, Spavor was assaulted by South Korean security officials as he tried to display the North Korean flag.

Outside of sports exchanges, Spavor also played a role in the restoration of the Ryongwang Pavilion in Pyongyang, spending four years on the project alongside the Prince Claus Fund and North Korea's National Administration for the Protection of Cultural Heritage.

Spavor is often consulted by analysts and journalists for insights into North Korea. He has, however, been reluctant to comment on politics and human rights in North Korea.

== Detention in China ==
In December 2018, China detained Spavor and Michael Kovrig, another Canadian national, on charges of endangering state security. The arrests came shortly after Canada had arrested Meng Wanzhou, the chief financial officer of Huawei, in what turned into an escalating diplomatic row between the two countries.

Spavor and Kovrig were reportedly held in isolation without being allowed outdoors, kept under lighting and surveillance 24 hours a day, with 6 to 8 hours of interrogations per day. China allowed three consular visits as of February 1, 2019. During Spavor's detention, his friends noticed suspicious activity on his social media accounts, leading them to believe Chinese interrogators were accessing his accounts.

In mid-December 2018, a GoFundMe campaign was started to raise funds for Spavor to help with any legal and travel costs following his release, but three weeks later on January 7, 2019, the crowdfunding platform terminated the campaign. Though the campaign had raised CA$14,000 before being terminated, GoFundMe gave less than $500 to the designated beneficiary (Spavor's brother). Though GoFundMe did not give an explanation, Spavor's friend speculated the reason might be Spavor's past promotion of tourism in North Korea, a country under US sanctions.

Andrei Lankov, an expert on North Korea, expressed surprise over Spavor's arrest in this "hostage game", saying that Spavor "is from very humble origins [and] definitely not the son of a CEO of a major Canadian company". Friends describe Spavor as "only pursuing his love for Korea" and "not really interested in politics... more passionate about things on a smaller scale – people-to-people interactions, and friendship among citizens of different countries, regardless of geopolitical climate or issues".

In the lead-up to the first high-level diplomatic talks between Chinese officials and American officials working for Joe Biden, Spavor's trial date was announced. On March 19, 2021, a two-hour closed court hearing for Spavor ended with no immediate verdict and Dandong Intermediate people's court stating that it would set a date to release a decision later. Because the case involved Chinese national security law, the chargé d'affaires at the Canadian Embassy in China was denied entry to provide consular assistance. Diplomats from the United States, the Netherlands, the United Kingdom, France, Denmark, Australia, Sweden and Germany also sought access but were denied.

On August 10, 2021, a Chinese court sentenced Spavor to 11 years in prison and said that he would be deported, though it was unclear when. With Meng Wanzhou's case dropped, Spavor was released shortly after on September 24, 2021 and returned to Canada.

=== Government settlement and allegations of intelligence sharing ===
According to a report by The Globe and Mail in November 2023, Spavor sought a multimillion-dollar settlement against the federal government for involving him in espionage activities without his knowledge. Spavor alleged that he provided Michael Kovrig with intelligence on North Korea, which Kovrig then secretly gave to the Canadian government and its Five Eyes allies without Spavor's permission, leading to their arrest and detention. According to the report, a "highly placed source" told The Globe that Kovrig was "considered an intelligence asset, as a diplomatic officer at the Global Security Reporting Program (GSRP) within the Canadian embassy in Beijing, and later when based in Hong Kong at International Crisis Group."

A watchdog report criticized the GSRP operating in a "distinctly grey zone", putting its officers and their contacts at risk and might breach global diplomatic conventions.

In December 2023, The Globe and Mail reported that the Canadian government has offered CA$3 million each to Kovrig and Spavor, while Spavor's lawyer is seeking $10.5 million. Spavor reached a $7 million settlement deal with the Canadian government in March 2024.

==== Reactions ====
In a statement, Global Affairs Canada denied that Kovrig was involved in espionage. Kerry Buck, a retired diplomat and senior fellow at the University of Ottawa's Graduate School of Public and International Affairs, also rejected claims of espionage, saying that "GSRP diplomats write diplomatic reports. As with all diplomatic reports, they are read by people in Ottawa, including the CSIS. [...] In no world does this make GSRP diplomats 'spies'."

In response to the report, Chinese foreign ministry spokesperson Wang Wenbin argued that the Canadian position on the Michaels detention being arbitrary had been "debunked by facts over time" and that the allegations were "a complete distortion of facts and blame-shifting".
