= Budapest Week =

English-language newspaper in Budapest

- Type: Weekly periodical newspaper
- Owner: Peter Freed (1992—2000)
- Founder: Rick Bruner, Steve Carlson, Richard W. Bruner, Tibor Szendrei, and Blake Steinberg
- Founded: March 1991; 35 years ago
- Ceased publication: 2000; 26 years ago
- Language: English
- Website: thebudapestweek.com

Budapest Week was the first independent English-language newspaper in Budapest, Hungary, founded in March 1991. The weekly periodical served the expatriate population and larger English-speaking population in Hungary.

== History ==
In March 1991, the paper was founded by Rick Bruner, Steve Carlson, Richard W. Bruner, Tibor Szendrei, and Blake Steinberg. It began as a 16-page paper and expanded to 32 pages by 2003. Canadian and journalist Michael Kovrig formerly served as managing editor.

Budapest Week was Hungary's first independent English language newspaper after the fall of Communism in Eastern Europe. It was followed by competitors, notably The Budapest Sun and The Budapest Business Journal. There was a newspaper that resembled Budapest Week and its role in the social movement of the expatriate scene there at the time in the popular novel Prague by Arthur Phillips.

In 1992, Peter Freed backed the paper financially and remained its owner until the paper ceased printing in 2000.
