= HanVoice =

Canadian rights group for North Koreans

- Formation: 2007
- Type: NGO
- Headquarters: Toronto, Ontario, Canada
- Members: 6-member board, 30 directors, 15 chapters, over 300 active members, and over 2,000 alum
- Executive Director: David Vella
- Website: www.hanvoice.ca

HanVoice is a national organization in Canada focused on improved human rights in North Korea and Canada's engagement in the Korean Peninsula.

In 2021, HanVoice reached an agreement with the Government of Canada to allow private Canadian citizens to sponsor North Korean refugees in transit countries. The Private Sponsorship of Refugees Program pilot seeks to resettle five North Korean refugee families in a two-year period. Among the candidates in transit countries, the program targets North Korean women and their children, who currently make up 80% of refugees and are at significant risk of violence against women. "North Koreans who have managed to flee their country have very few options of settling safely without risk of immigration detention or repatriation," Executive Director, Sean Chung said. "Canada is now a safe pathway. We hope this can be the spark that opens new doors around the world for North Korean refugees."
