= Detention of Michael Spavor and Michael Kovrig =

2018–2021 detention of Canadians in China

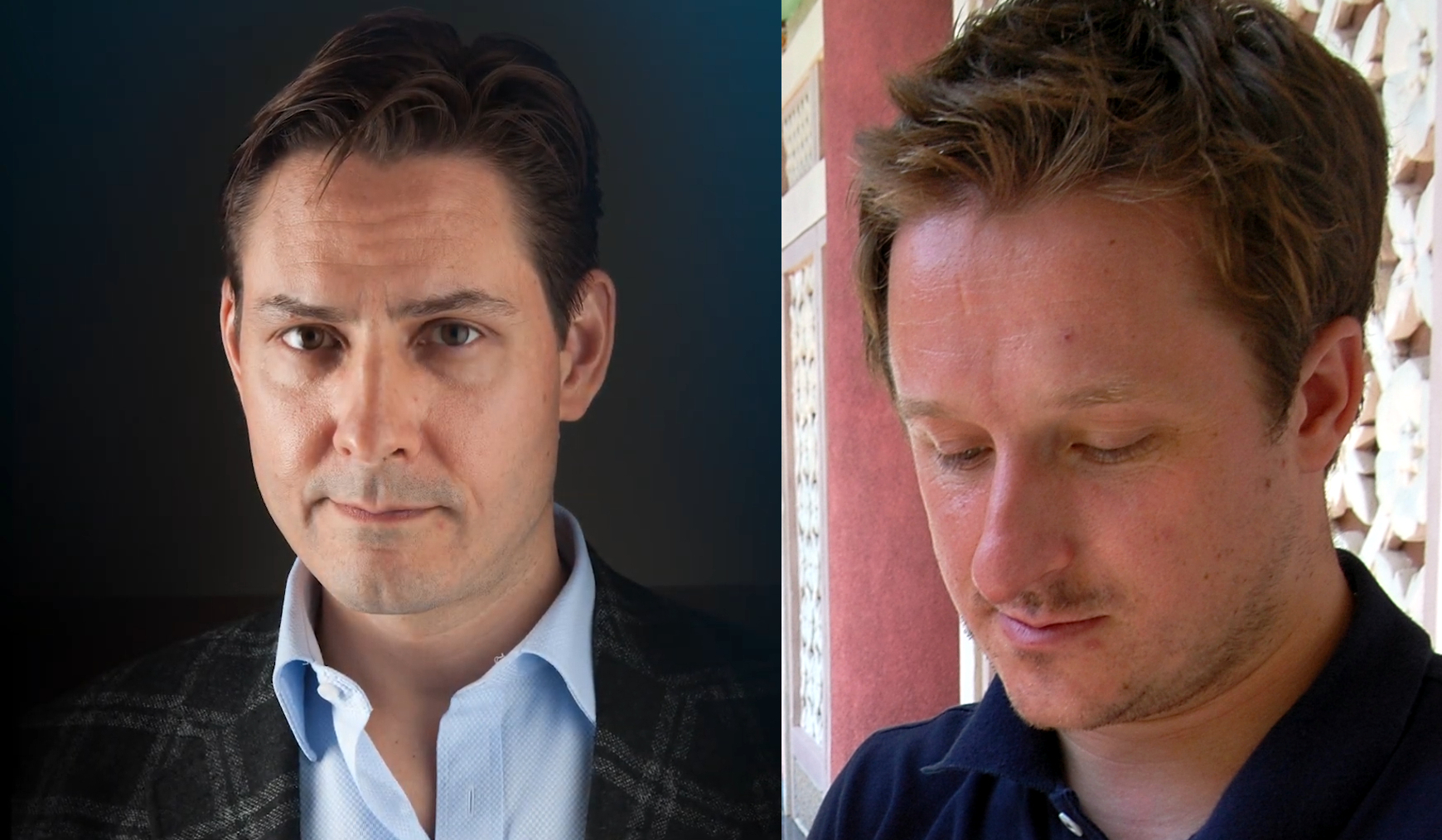
Michael Kovrig (left) and Michael Spavor (right)

In December 2018, Canadian nationals Michael Spavor and Michael Kovrig were taken into custody in China. It appeared that their detention on December 10 and subsequent indictment under the state secrets law were linked to the arrest of Huawei's chief financial officer, Meng Wanzhou, in Canada on December 1. In English-language media, the pair are frequently and colloquially referred to as the Two Michaels.

Prior to his detention and arrest, Kovrig was working for the International Crisis Group out of its Hong Kong office. He previously worked for the United Nations and as a Canadian diplomat. Spavor had been a consultant and the director of Paektu Cultural Exchange, an organization that promotes investment and tourism in North Korea.

On September 24, 2021, Canadian Prime Minister Justin Trudeau announced that Kovrig and Spavor had been released from detention in China after 1,019 days, shortly after Meng was released from house arrest in Canada. In 2023, Spavor accused Kovrig of using him for espionage without his knowledge, resulting in him unwittingly passing on information relating to North Korea to Canadian intelligence agencies. In November 2023, Spavor sought a multimillion-dollar settlement against the federal government for involving him in espionage activities without his knowledge. Michael Spavor reached a $7 million settlement deal with the Canadian government in March 2024.

== Background ==
=== Michael Spavor ===
Michael Spavor is a consultant who worked in North Korea. He is a founding member and director of Paektu Cultural Exchange, an NGO that facilitates sports, cultural, tourism and business exchanges with the Democratic People's Republic of Korea (North Korea).

=== Michael Kovrig ===
Michael Kovrig (born February 3, 1972) is a Canadian former diplomat and geopolitical analyst and advisor working for the International Crisis Group, a transnational, independent, non-governmental organization focused on preventing and resolving deadly conflict through research and advocacy. He wrote about geopolitical issues including China's military in Africa in addition to the North Korea nuclear crisis.

Previously, Kovrig had worked for Canada's Foreign Affairs department internationally and domestically for about a decade, was posted in Beijing between 2014 and 2016 as first secretary and vice consul and consul in Hong Kong. Kovrig was considered an intelligence asset, as a diplomatic officer at the Global Security Reporting Program (GSRP) within the Canadian embassy in Beijing, and later when based in Hong Kong at International Crisis Group, according to a 2023 report.

He also worked for the United Nations Development Programme in New York City as a strategic communications specialist, and as a researcher for the firm that later became Rhodium Group.

After being detained in December 2018, he was accused of "Spying on State Secrets or Intelligence for Parties Outside the Territory of China" by the Chinese government in May 2019. His arrest was widely considered to be political retaliation for the arrest of Meng, though the Chinese government has denied any connection between the two cases. Kovrig, Crisis Group and the Canadian government all insisted that he was innocent of all charges and US President Joe Biden declared that he and Spavor were being used as "bartering chips".

=== Arrest of Meng Wanzhou ===
The detention of Michael Kovrig and Michael Spavor followed the arrest of Meng Wanzhou by Canadian authorities. Meng was the chief financial officer of the Chinese telecom giant Huawei, founded by her father Ren Zhengfei. She was arrested at the Vancouver International Airport by the Royal Canadian Mounted Police (RCMP) at the request of the United States, pursuant to the extradition treaty between Canada and the United States. On January 28, 2019, the U.S. Department of Justice (DOJ) announced financial fraud charges against Meng. If proven guilty, Meng potentially faced up to 10 years' imprisonment per 18 U.S.C. § 1832.

== Arrest and detention ==
Kovrig joined the International Crisis Group in February 2017 as a senior adviser for North East Asia. On December 10, 2018, Michael Kovrig was detained in Beijing around the same time as Michael Spavor, a Canadian consultant with a personal relationship with Kim Jong-un and a history of working with North Korea. Following their detention, the men were transferred to detention facilities where they were interrogated for up to eight hours a day. The lights in their cells were reportedly left on 24 hours a day, and they were denied access to consular officials and to their lawyers. The prosecutors of China later charged the two Canadians with espionage endangering China's national security. If proven, such a crime may result in life sentences or more, to ensure the nondisclosure of illegally gathered intelligence. Canadian Prime Minister Justin Trudeau called their arrest "arbitrary".

In March 2020, amidst the COVID-19 pandemic, Kovrig was permitted by the Chinese government to have a telephone conversation with his sick father.

=== Chinese legal proceedings ===
On June 19, 2020, the men were formally charged with spying on national secrets and providing state secrets to entities outside of China.

In the lead-up to the first high-level diplomatic talks between Chinese officials and American officials working for Joe Biden, Spavor and Kovrig's trial dates were announced. On March 19, 2021, a two-hour closed court hearing for Spavor ended with no immediate verdict and Dandong Intermediate people's court stating that it would set a date to release a decision later. Because the case involved Chinese national security law, the chargé d'affaires at the Canadian Embassy in China was denied entry to provide consular assistance. Diplomats from the United States, the Netherlands, the United Kingdom, France, Denmark, Australia, Sweden and Germany also sought access but were denied. Kovrig's trial was scheduled for March 22. It ended with the identical statement - that the verdict will be announced at an unspecified later date.

On August 10, 2021, the Dandong Intermediate People's Court found Michael Spavor guilty of espionage. The evidence presented at the trial was not made public. Spavor was sentenced to eleven years in prison, in addition to the confiscation of ¥50,000, and his deportation. The statement released by the court did not specify when the deportation would take place, but China typically deports convicted foreigners after the completion of their prison sentence.

Canada's Ambassador to China, Dominic Barton, accused the Chinese government of timing Spavor's verdict, as well as that of Robert Schellenberg one day prior, to coincide with that of Meng, which was occurring simultaneously in Canada.

Michael Kovrig was tried on March 22, 2021; the verdict was to be announced at an unspecified later date. The trials were held in closed sessions in accordance with China's rules of criminal procedure for national security cases. As of August 11, 2021, the verdict was still unknown to the Canadian Foreign Affairs Minister Marc Garneau.

== International response ==
Their arrest became a subsequent point of contention for Canada–China relations.

On January 21, 2019, more than 220 political and academic individuals signed a letter calling on China to release Kovrig and Spavor.

On April 23, 2020, the 500th day of Kovrig's detention, Trudeau said consular visits for the detained Canadians were being blocked on account of the coronavirus lockdown.

On September 5, 2021, a "March for the Michaels" was held in Ottawa to mark the thousandth day of Spavor and Kovrig's detention. Organized and attended by the families of the two Michaels, about 150 people gathered to walk 7000 steps, meant to replicate the number of steps Kovrig took daily to maintain fitness in his prison cell.

== Release and aftermath ==
On September 24, 2021, Canadian Prime Minister Justin Trudeau announced that the two Michaels were released and returning to Canada on a plane with Canadian Ambassador to China, Dominic Barton. Their release came on the same day that Meng was released after the dropping of her extradition request as part of her deferred prosecution agreement with the US Department of Justice. Kovrig and Spavor arrived at Calgary International Airport the next morning, where they were greeted by Trudeau and Foreign Affairs Minister Marc Garneau. Spavor remained in Calgary, while Kovrig flew to Toronto Pearson International Airport to meet his family.

At a press conference held on September 27, China Ministry of Foreign Affairs spokesperson Hua Chunying maintained that the cases of Meng and the two Michaels were separate, stating that the two had "applied for release on bail for medical reasons".

A 2023 Global News investigation claimed that then-Liberal MP Han Dong privately advised a senior Chinese diplomat to hold off freeing Kovrig and Spavor in 2021. In a statement, Dong said that although he had spoken to the consul-general, he had not initiated it, and he had not suggested delaying the release of the Spavor and Kovrig, instead calling for their release. Following his review into allegations of Chinese government interference in the 2019 and 2021 Canadian federal elections, Special Rapporteur David Johnston said that allegations that Dong had told Chinese officials to extend the detention of Kovrig and Spavor were false.

=== Government settlement and allegations of intelligence sharing ===
According to a report by The Globe and Mail in November 2023, Spavor sought a multimillion-dollar settlement against the federal government for involving him in espionage activities without his knowledge. Spavor alleged that he provided Michael Kovrig with intelligence on North Korea, which Kovrig then secretly gave to the Canadian government and its Five Eyes allies without Spavor's permission, leading to their arrest and detention. According to the report, a "highly placed source" told The Globe that Kovrig was "considered an intelligence asset, as a diplomatic officer at the Global Security Reporting Program (GSRP) within the Canadian embassy in Beijing, and later when based in Hong Kong at International Crisis Group."

A watchdog report criticized the GSRP operating in a "distinctly grey zone", putting its officers and their contacts at risk and might breach global diplomatic conventions.

In December 2023, The Globe and Mail reported that the Canadian government offered CA$3 million each to Kovrig and Spavor, while Spavor's lawyer was seeking $10.5 million. Spavor reached a $7 million settlement deal with the Canadian government in March 2024.

==== Reactions ====
In a statement, Global Affairs Canada denied that Kovrig was involved in espionage. Kerry Buck, a retired diplomat and senior fellow at the University of Ottawa's Graduate School of Public and International Affairs, also rejected claims of espionage, saying that "GSRP diplomats write diplomatic reports. As with all diplomatic reports, they are read by people in Ottawa, including the CSIS. [...] In no world does this make GSRP diplomats 'spies'."

In response to the report, Chinese foreign ministry spokesperson Wang Wenbin argued that the Canadian position on the Michaels detention being arbitrary had been "debunked by facts over time" and that the allegations were "a complete distortion of facts and blame-shifting".
