= Kerry Buck =

Canadian diplomat

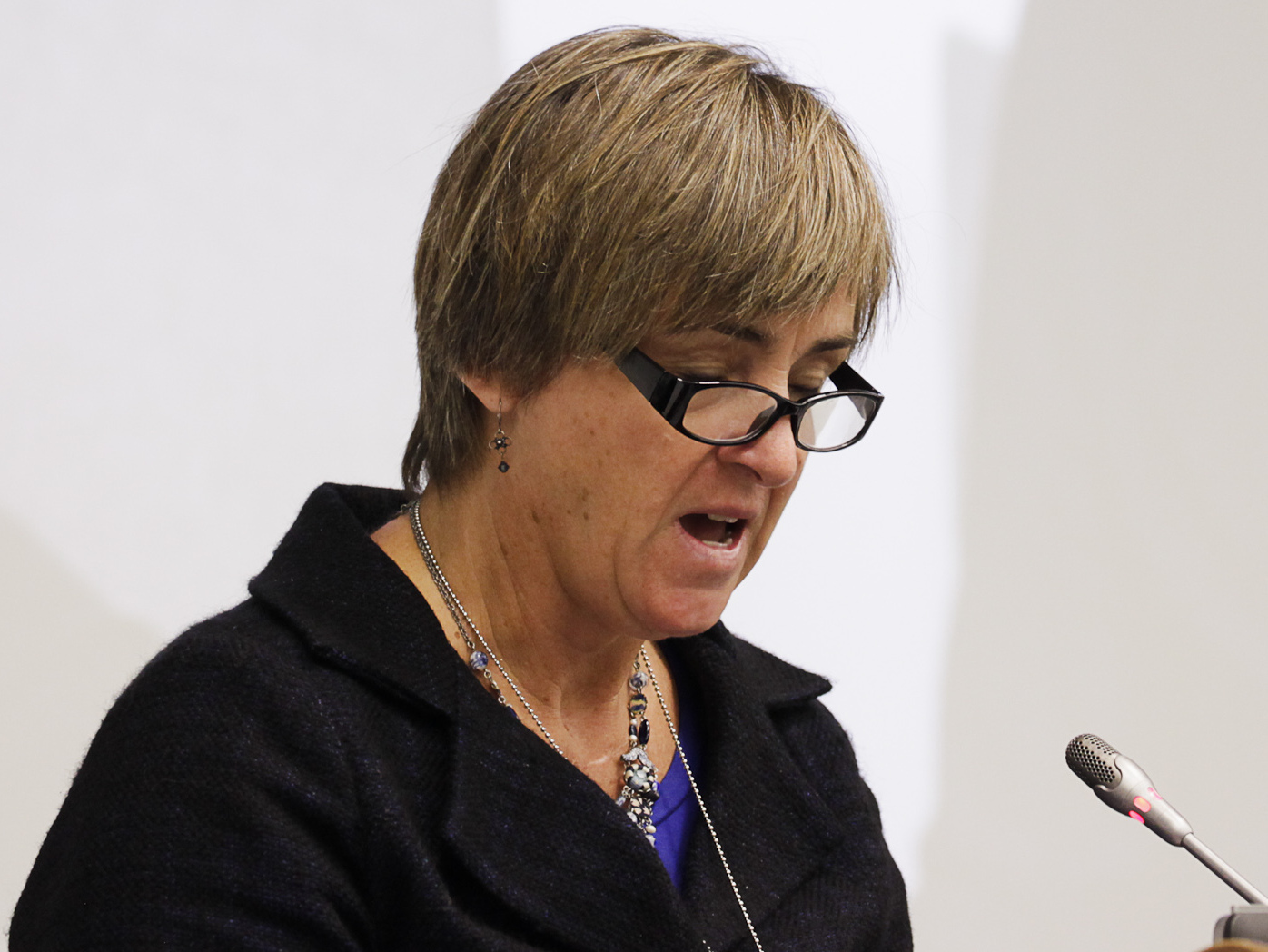
New York Assistant Deputy Minister, Department of Foreign Affairs of Canada, Kerry Buck on 23 September, 2011 at the Conference on Facilitating the Entry into Force of the CTBT

Kerry Buck is a Canadian diplomat; she was the Permanent Representative and Ambassador to NATO from 2015 until 2019. Buck joined Global Affairs Canada in 1991. Buck is a Senior Fellow at University of Ottawa's Graduate School of Public and International Affairs.

== Education ==
Buck earned her undergraduate political science degree from the University of Western Ontario, a Bachelor of Laws and Bachelor of Civil Law in civil and common law from McGill University Faculty of Law.

== Career ==
From 2011 until 2015, she was Political Director and Assistant Deputy Minister for International Security and Political Affairs.

After serving at NATO, Buck was the Treasury Board of Canada Secretariat Assistant Secretary, Economic Sector from 2018 until 2021.
