= Asset (intelligence) =

Informants for spies

In intelligence, assets are persons within organizations or countries being spied upon who provide information for an outside spy. They are sometimes referred to as agents, and in law enforcement parlance, as confidential informants, or "CIs" for short.

There are different categories of assets, including people who:

- Willingly work for a foreign government for ideological reasons such as being against their own government, but live in a country that doesn't allow political opposition. They may elect to work with a foreign power to change their own country because there are few other ways available.
- Work in intergovernmental relations for a different part of their government but relay information to their country's intelligence agency. They often obtain useful information in the course of their other work and are sometimes tasked with seeking it out.
- Work for monetary gain. Intelligence services often pay good wages to people in important positions that are willing to betray secrets.
- Have been blackmailed and are forced into their role.
- Do not even know they are being used (so called "useful idiots"). Assets can be loyal to their country, but may still provide a foreign agent with information through failures in information safety, such as using insecure computers or not following proper OPSEC procedures during day-to-day chatting.
