= University of Ottawa's Graduate School of Public and International Affairs =

Public policy school of the University of Ottawa

Coordinates: 45.42405°N 75.68731°W

University of Ottawa’s Graduate School of Public and International Affairs
- Established: 2007
- Director: Roland Paris
- Academic staff: 30
- Postgraduates: 120-150
- Location: Ottawa, Ontario, Canada
- Website: https://www.uottawa.ca/faculty-social-sciences/public-international-affairs

University of Ottawa’s Graduate School of Public and International Affairs (GSPIA) (or l'École supérieure d'affaires publiques et internationales de l'Université d'Ottawa (ESAPI)) is a professional public and international policy school at the Faculty of Social Sciences at the University of Ottawa in Ottawa, Ontario, Canada.

== Degree Programs ==
GSPIA offers a multidisciplinary master’s program (Master of Arts) with three fields of concentration:

- public policy
- international affairs
- development studies

The program, which is only offered on a full-time basis, also offers a coop option and internship opportunities in Canadian missions abroad.

== History ==
Founded in 2007, the Graduate School of Public and International Affairs is one of two bilingual schools of public and international affairs in Canada, where courses are taught in Canada's two official languages, French and English.

In addition to a faculty complement of more than 30 professors, students benefit from the presence of a number of Senior Fellows including former Canadian diplomats Robert Fowler and Claude Laverdure, as well as respected journalist Jeffrey Simpson.

== See also ==
- Public policy school
- Carleton University's School of Public Policy and Administration
