= Meng Wanzhou =

Chinese business executive

- 孟晚舟
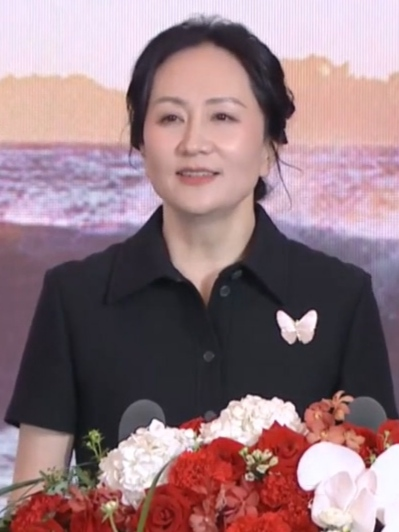
- Meng in 2022
- Born: Ren Wanzhou; 13 February 1972 (age 54); Chengdu, Sichuan, China
- Other name: Cathy Meng
- Education: Huazhong University of Science and Technology
- Occupation: Businesswoman
- Years active: 1993–present
- Title: Deputy chairwoman and CFO, Huawei
- Political party: Chinese Communist Party
- Criminal charges: Bank fraud, wire fraud, conspiracies to commit bank and wire fraud (dropped)
- Spouses: Zheng Qize (divorced); Liu Xiaozong (m. 2007)
- Children: 4
- Father: Ren Zhengfei

Chinese name
- Chinese: 孟晚舟
Transcriptions
Standard Mandarin
- Hanyu Pinyin: Mèng Wǎnzhōu
- Wade–Giles: Mêng^{4} Wan^{3}-chou^{1}
- IPA: [mə̂ŋ wànʈʂóʊ]
Southern Min
- Hokkien POJ: Bēng Boán-chiu

Meng Wanzhou (Chinese: 孟晚舟; born 13 February 1972), also known as Cathy Meng and Sabrina Meng, also informally known in China as the "Princess of Huawei", is a Chinese business executive. She is the deputy chair of the board and chief financial officer (CFO) of Huawei, which was founded by her father Ren Zhengfei.

On 1 December 2018, Meng was detained and interrogated at Vancouver International Airport by the Canada Border Services Agency and subsequently placed under house arrest on extradition request by United States Department of Justice under the indictment of bank and wire fraud regarding financial transactions in violation of U.S. sanctions against Iran by Skycom, which had functioned as Huawei's Iran-based subsidiary. On 24 September 2021, the DOJ announced it had reached a plea bargain with Meng to resolve the case through a deferred prosecution agreement, and it would move to dismiss all charges against Meng when the deferral period ended on 21 December 2022, on the condition that Meng was not charged with any other crime before then. Meng was released from house arrest and left Canada for China on 24 September 2021. On 1 December 2022, the prosecution asked a judge to dismiss bank fraud and other charges against her and the judge dismissed the charges the next day.

== Early life and education ==
Meng Wanzhou was born Ren Wanzhou on 13 February 1972 in Chengdu, Sichuan province. She is the daughter of Ren Zhengfei and his first wife, Meng Jun, who is the daughter of Meng Dongbo, a former deputy secretary of East China Military and Administrative Committees and deputy provincial governor of Sichuan. She has a younger brother Ren Ping (formerly Meng Ping), who also works for Huawei. After her parents divorced when she was 16, she adopted her mother's surname Meng.

After divorcing Meng Jun, Ren Zhengfei married Yao Ling, with whom he had another daughter, Annabel Yao. The half-sister is 25 years younger than Meng Wanzhou, and made a high-profile debut at Le Bal des Débutantes in Paris in November 2018.

After graduating from college in 1992, Meng worked for China Construction Bank for a year before joining Huawei, then a startup company founded by her father, as a secretary. She attended graduate school in 1997 and earned a master's degree in accounting from the Huazhong University of Science and Technology.

== Career ==
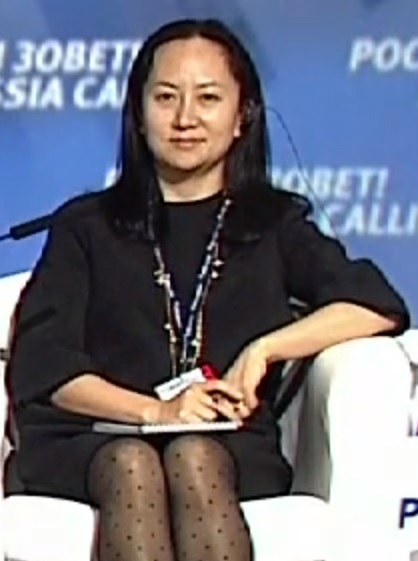
Meng at the Russia Calling! Investment Forum in 2014

In an interview with the Chinese newspaper 21st Century Business Herald, she said her career took off after she returned to Huawei in 1998 to work in the finance department. She held positions including head of international accounting, chief financial officer (CFO) of Huawei Hong Kong, and director of the Accounting Management Department.

When Huawei first published the names of its top executives in 2011, Meng was already listed as its CFO. In March 2018, she was appointed as one of the four vice chairpersons of the board, fueling speculation that she was being groomed to eventually succeed her father. However, Ren has denied such claims, telling Sina Tech that "none of my family members possess [suitable] qualities" and "will never be included in the sequence of successors."

As of December 2018, Meng was the deputy chairwoman and CFO of Huawei, China's largest privately held company, with 180,000 employees. In 2017, Forbes ranked Meng 8th in its list of Outstanding Businesswomen of China, while Huawei chairwoman Sun Yafang (who stepped down in March 2018) was ranked 2nd.

On 25 October 2021, video clips showing Meng being welcomed back by Huawei employees at the Shenzhen headquarters circulated prompting confirmation that Meng had resumed work after completing a compulsory 21-day COVID-19 quarantine. She also celebrated her father's 77th birthday on the same day.

== Extradition case ==
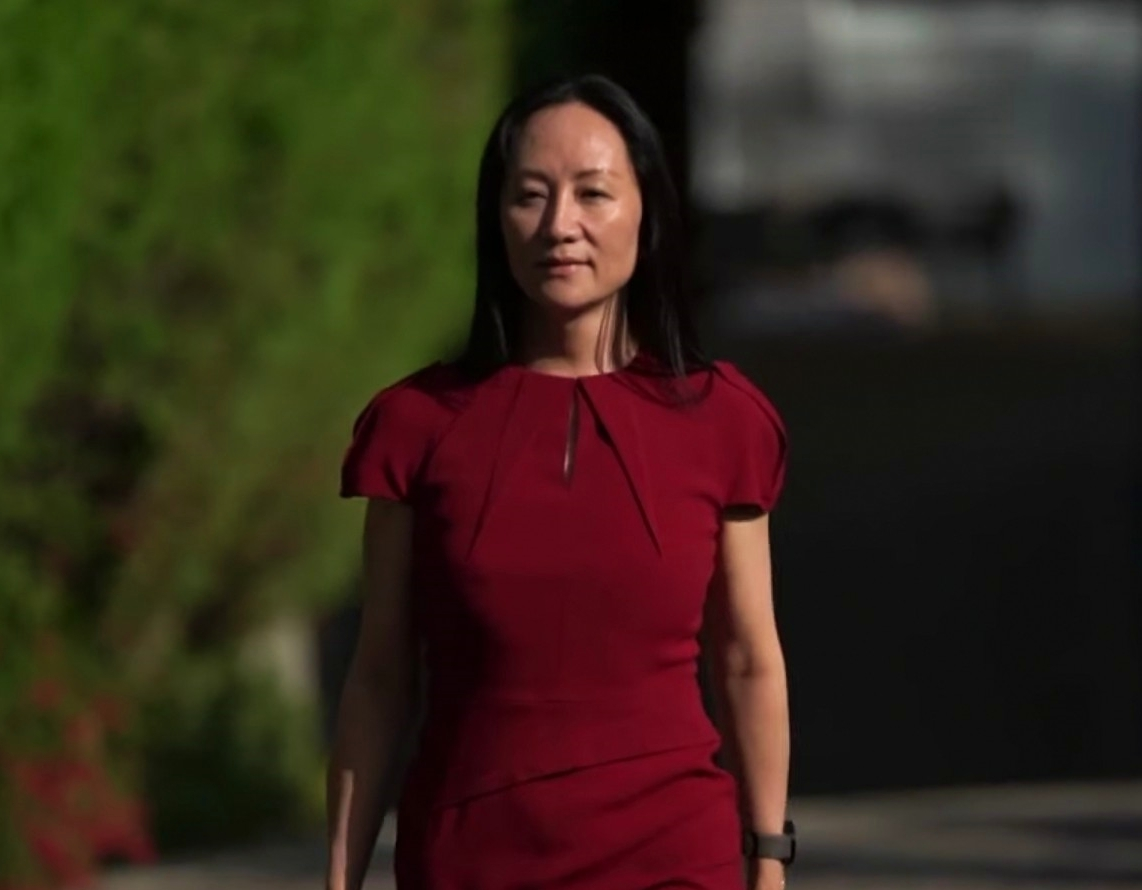
Meng during her time under house arrest in Vancouver in 2021

On 1 December 2018, Meng was detained upon arrival at Vancouver International Airport by Canada Border Services Agency officers for questioning, which lasted three hours. The Royal Canadian Mounted Police subsequently arrested her on a provisional U.S. extradition request for fraud and conspiracy to commit fraud in order to circumvent U.S. sanctions against Iran.

On 28 January 2019, the U.S. Department of Justice formally announced financial fraud charges against Meng. The first stage of the extradition hearing for Meng began Monday 20 January 2020 and concluded on 27 May 2020 when a BC Court ordered the extradition to proceed. On 13 February 2020, Meng was personally indicted by the U.S. Department of Justice on charges of trade secrets theft.

During the extradition courtroom proceedings, Meng's lawyers made several allegations against the prosecution, including allegations of unlawful detention of Meng, unlawful search and seizure, extradition law violations, misrepresentation, international law violation, and fabricated testimonies by the CBSA, each of which were responded to by the prosecution. In August 2021, the extradition judge questioned the regularity of the case and expressed great difficulty in understanding how the Record of Case (ROC) presented by the US supported their allegation of criminality.

On 18 September 2021, The Globe and Mail, citing Canadian sources, reported that the U.S. Department of Justice had a talk with Huawei and the lawyers representing Meng and had offered to end the extradition request and criminal proceedings if Meng pleaded "guilty" to the charges and paid a large fine.

On 24 September 2021, the Department of Justice announced it had reached a deal with Meng to resolve their case against her by deferring their criminal charges and withdrawing their extradition request after she entered into a deferred prosecution agreement with them. As part of the deal, Meng agreed to a statement of facts, admitting she had made untrue statements about Huawei concealing its link to Skycom and operating it in violation of US sanctions against Iran, but was allowed to formally deny her key charges and did not have to pay a fine. The Department of Justice said it would move to dismiss all the charges against Meng when the deferral period ends on 21 December 2022, on the condition that Meng is not charged with a crime before then. Meng left Vancouver on the same day aboard a Chinese government-arranged Air China charter flight bound for Shenzhen, Guangdong, China after spending more than 1000 days under house arrest in the city as part of her bail condition. She arrived and was greeted to a hero's welcome at the Shenzhen Bao'an International Airport on 25 September 2021.

On 1 December 2022, the prosecution asked a judge to dismiss bank fraud and other charges against her, and the judge dismissed the charges.

== Personal life ==
Meng moved to Vancouver, British Columbia, Canada, and obtained permanent residency in 2001. She also has had Hong Kong permanent residence since at least 2011.

In 2007, Meng married businessman Liu Xiaozong (刘晓棕), who formerly worked for Huawei for ten years. The couple have a daughter, and own two multimillion-dollar residences in Vancouver. Meng also has three sons from a previous marriage.

According to media reports, Meng has high blood pressure, sleep apnea and hyperthyroidism. It was reported that in May 2018, she had an operation to remove her thyroid gland.

== See also ==
- Detention of Michael Spavor and Michael Kovrig
- Sanctions against Iran
