= Canada–China relations =

- Canada: China

Diplomatic mission
- Canadian Embassy, Beijing: Embassy of China, Ottawa

Envoy
- Ambassador Jennifer May: Ambassador Wang Di

Diplomatic relations between Canada and China officially date back to when Canada first established a foreign ministry on January 9, 1909, at which point Canada was still part of the British Empire and China was ruled by the Qing dynasty. By 1942, Canada sent an ambassador to the Republic of China (ROC). The Chinese Communist Party (CCP)'s victory in the Chinese Civil War and subsequent proclamation of the People's Republic of China (PRC) in 1949 did not break the relations with the Republic of China until 1970, when Canadian Prime Minister Pierre Trudeau became one of the first Western leaders to recognize the PRC.

Relations between the Canadian and Chinese governments had deteriorated significantly after the detention of Huawei CFO Meng Wanzhou by Canada in 2018 and the subsequent detention of Michael Spavor and Michael Kovrig by China. According to Canadian intelligence, China made efforts to interfere in the 2019 and 2021 elections. Relations between Canada and China improved under Prime Minister Mark Carney, subsequent to the deterioration of Canada–United States relations. In 2024, China was Canada's second largest export and import partner after the United States.

== History ==
=== Prior to 1949 ===
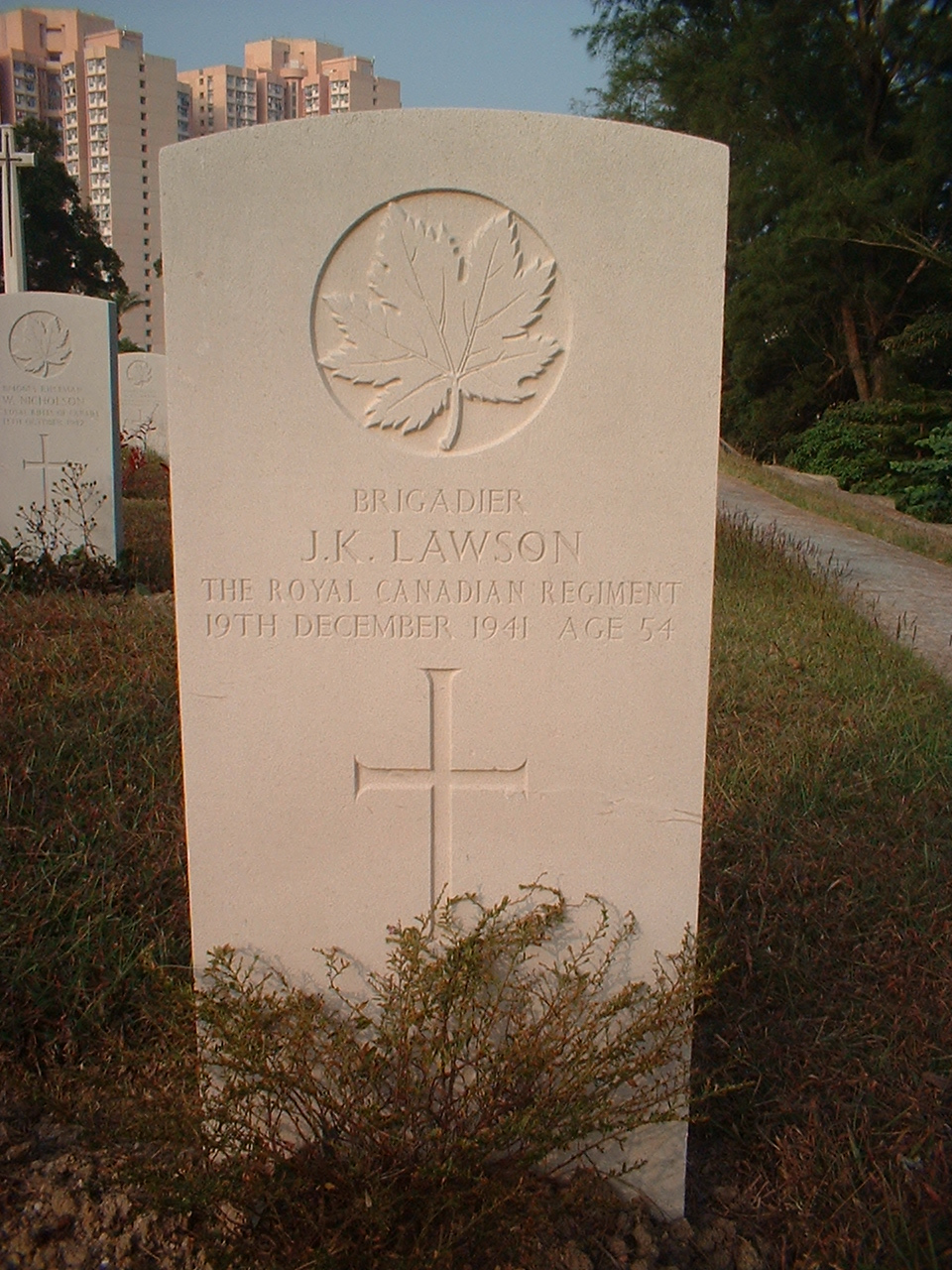
The headstone of Brigadier John K. Lawson at Hong Kong's Sai Wan War Cemetery

As part of the British Empire and later the Commonwealth of Nations, Canada did not establish a foreign ministry (External Affairs) until 1909 and developed an independent foreign policy only after passage of the Statute of Westminster 1931. Canada posted one third of six battalions to Hong Kong before the Battle of Hong Kong, which was lost to the Japanese Imperial Army, from 25 December 1941 to 16 September 1945, more than a month after the atomic bombings of Hiroshima and Nagasaki. Canada established embassies overseas only in the 1940s, and in 1942, Canada posted its first ambassador in the ROC's wartime capital of Chongqing. The embassy was moved to Nanjing in 1946.

=== Establishment of the People's Republic of China ===
Canada faced a dilemma following the Communist victory in the Chinese Civil War in 1949. On many issues, Canada followed the lead of British and the United States, but those two governments followed different policies on China. The United Kingdom, under the control of a socialist government, extended diplomatic recognition to the Communist Chinese, but the United States refused to recognize the Communist government. After the Liberal victory in the Canadian federal election of 1949 and more discussion, Canada followed the British approach. The Canadian embassy in Nanjing was kept open, and Canada posted a chargé d'affaires. By 23 June 1950, the Canadian Department of External Affairs had prepared instructions for the chargé to open negotiations with the Chinese government for an exchange of ambassadors.

=== Korean War ===
However, the Korean War began two days later, on 25 June 1950. With Canadian troops fighting for the United Nations forces, which opposed Communist Chinese troops, the continuation of diplomatic relations became untenable. After Canada voted in favour of a UN resolution that branded PRC an aggressor, the Chinese government asked the Canadian chargé d'affaires to leave. The Canadian embassy in Nanjing was closed on 26 February 1951. Thereafter, Canada maintained diplomatic relations with the Republic of China, whose government had evacuated to Taiwan after losing to the Communists. However, Canada did not send an ambassador to the new capital of Taipei. Instead, relations were maintained through the ROC ambassador to Canada.

=== Early Cultural Revolution (1966-1968) ===
Canada's inclination to establish relations with the PRC was motivated by the intent to end China's isolation, which Prime Minister Lester Pearson saw as a threat to "world peace and the integrity of the post-war collective security system embodied in the UN." During Pearson's prime ministership, a multilateral approach was taken, intending to see the PRC recognized in the United Nations under a possible two-China policy. Still, Pearson and his cabinet were sensitive to U.S. and with Republic of China (ROC) officials' opinions, not intending to antagonize either state needlessly. Pearson saw Canada as reaping most of the benefits of PRC relations without recognition, as trade continued between the two states unhindered. The Liberal Party of Canada, however, in October 1966 internally approved a resolution "calling for immediate recognition of Peking and its admission to the United Nations."

In November 1966, Canada's Secretary of State for External Affairs, Paul Martin Sr., voted "absention" on the annual Albanian Resolution to change the "China seat" from the present ROC government in Taiwan to the PRC, breaking with their U.S. ally. A milder than expected U.S. reaction shocked Canadian officials and the object rejection of an interim solution of dual representation for the ROC in Taiwan and the PRC in the UN, proposed by Paul Martin Sr., pushed him to pursue a bilateral approach. The outbreak of the Cultural Revolution, however, resulted in foreign officials working in China to be attacked and stalled efforts towards recognition.

On the outbreak of the revolution, all but one of the PRC’s ambassadors would be recalled in order to participate in the Cultural Revolution. In October 1966, PRC embassies would be instructed by the CCP that "the dissemination of Mao Zedong Thought was the first and foremost task," ultimately causing tensions between the PRC and numerous countries, including formerly friendly states Nepal, Burma and Cambodia. In February 1967, The PRC's Ministry of Foreign Affairs (MFA) would fall under the control of the Central Cultural Revolution Group, as it became the main centre of decision-making. In August 1967, "MFA radical rebels in cooperation with the Red Guards from Beijing’s Foreign Languages Institute seized power in the Department of Political Affairs of the [MFA]." An attack on a British mission a week later, in response to the suppression of left-wing agitators in Hong Kong, would shock PRC leaders Mao Zedong and Zhou Enlai, who would be eager "to restore normality to the MFA and China’s diplomacy."

=== Pierre Trudeau Era and the Late Cultural Revolution (1968-1976) ===
The PRC's eagerness to end its isolation opened doors for newly elected Prime Minister Pierre Trudeau to push for a more committed PRC recognition policy. Pierre Trudeau, who campaigned on recognizing the PRC "as soon as possible," saw Canadian politics as underemphasizing its Pacific connections. His own experience visiting Mainland China on two occasions, once in 1949 and again in 1960, made him the first Canadian prime minister to have meaningful experiences within China prior to entering office. Trudeau's efforts to recognize the PRC were possible as Canada "had no strategic commitment to Taiwan or Vietnam, no anti-PRC lobby, and no urgent pressure to contain the Chinese communism."

Still, opposition arose from critics who accused Trudeau "of being soft on socialism and communism and holding leftist sympathies for Cuba, China, and the Soviet Union." Additionally, the Catholic Church in Quebec "adamantly opposed opening relations with China." Chinese officials had paid attention to Trudeau's positive stance on PRC recognition and saw Canada as a useful partner to reengaging in international relations, primarily as the country was "close to the United States, "somewhat independent" of the United States, and interested in more than commercial relations."

Chinese and Canadian officials discussed the technicalities of formal recognition at the Stockholm Conference, which pushed into 1970. The confounding factor was the ROC government in Taiwan, which the two states held opposing views on. Canada formally recognized the PRC as representatives of China on 13 October 1970 and established formal diplomatic ties, leaving the question of the ROC government unresolved. U.S. officials reacted with less concern as the transition to a more sympathetic Nixon administration occurred in 1968. In 1971, following the PRC's establishment of diplomatic ties with 10 other nations, the Albanian resolution was passed with Canadian support, passing the 'China seat' from the ROC government to the PRC.

During the remainder of the Cultural Revolution, the two countries continued to increase favourable relations. An official Canadian trade exhibition opened in Beijing in 1972 produced a windfall for Canadian business and for bilateral relations. Additionally, Canadian wheat markets continued to be supported by Chinese demand. The two nations also agreed "to exchange engineers and scientists as part of a foreign exchange programme." In October 1973, Pierre Trudeau became the first Canadian Prime Minister to pay an official visit to the PRC, meeting Chairman of the Chinese Communist Party Mao Zedong. In that year, the trade balance was heavily weighted in Canada's favour. Upon Trudeau's return, he remarked on "his own empathy for China's revolution and some of the accomplishments of its Communist leaders."

Another development came in 1973, when Canada and China agreed on a bilateral "family reunification agreement" which sought to allow multinational families split between Canada and China to reunify. The agreement followed a 1972 change in PRC policy, by which authorities would "assist, rather than deter, people who desired to emigrate." Both governments were highly conducive towards the agreement, demonstrated by "Beijing's surprising initiative in pursuing the accord" and Canadian officials willingness to accept PRC migrants.

The Canadian government was optimistic about the PRC's market-oriented reforms of the 1970s and 1980s, but it was difficult to see much substantial improvement as the Cultural Revolution raged.

=== Late Pierre Trudeau and Brian Mulroney Era ===
In October 1983, the Foreign Minister of the PRC Wu Xueqian visited Canada and signed the Agreement on Developing Cooperation between China and Canada.

In 1984, Chinese Premier Zhao Ziyang visited the second Trudeau government six months before it fell, and became the first Chinese Communist Party senior leader to address Parliament of Canada. Zhao signed the Agreement on the Protection of Investment between China and Canada. Zhao would later be subject to 15 years of house arrest until his death, because he opposed the Tiananmen Square crackdown in 1989.

In May 1986, the Mulroney government in China signed with Zhao the Agreement on Prevention of Double Taxation and Tax Evasions between China and Canada.

=== The Chretien era ===
Early in their tenures under Jean Chretien, Ministers Allan Rock and André Ouellet felt it beneficial to sign a treaty with China that gave the Chinese access to the powers of the Mutual Legal Assistance in Criminal Matters Act (Canada), and in fact it was signed in Beijing by the latter in July 1994.

Chretien accompanied to China about 300 business leaders on a trade mission in November 1994 who returned with an order book of $9 billion. Senior figures in government like International Trade Minister Roy MacLaren were convinced that Canada needed to diversify away from the United States and so adopted a "Four Pillars Policy." Canada believed that to engage the Chinese in more open trade and to support China's accession to World Trade Organization accession would help Canada's goals. In fact, Chrétien strongly endorsed Chinese accession: "With China's accession to the WTO, tariffs will drop and access by Chinese consumers and business to our products and services will increase.... WTO accession is part of China's broad agenda of developing the rule of law, to ensure fair and equal treatment before the courts for both people and companies.... Human rights are good for business." Always a mug, Chrétien told the "Chinese they would have to clean up their image if they expected to do business on the world stage."

In November 1997, the Chretien government signed with the government of CCP General Secretary Jiang Zemin: the Consular Agreement between the Chinese and Canadian Governments, the Memorandum of Understanding between the Chinese National Tourism Administration and the Canadian Tourism Commission on the Cooperation on Tourism, three Memorandums of Understanding on development assistance, and an exchange of letters between China and Canada on the mutual establishment of more consulates-general.

In April 1999, the two countries signed: a plan of action on environmental cooperation between the Chinese and Canadian Governments, the memorandum of understanding between the Chinese and Canadian Governments on cooperation in the crackdown on crimes and three protocols on China's import of animal products from Canada.

The Chinese finally acceded to the World Trade Organization in 2001, and the Canadians sent another trade mission to celebrate and to ink more deals. As MacLaren said in 2019:

To get China into the WTO was fundamental to our trade policy. For China to be a partner, accepting the disciplines of a rules-based trade organization was immensely important as a first step. We [believed that] deepening trade and investment relations with China, not only through the Team Canada mission but the far more important question of getting China into the WTO, would lead – in my view and in Jean Chretien's view – to human-rights advances. As the Chinese economy expanded and liberalized, China would be drawn into the liberal international order. I have no doubt that the China strategy was the right one. In my view, it worked.

=== Harper era ===
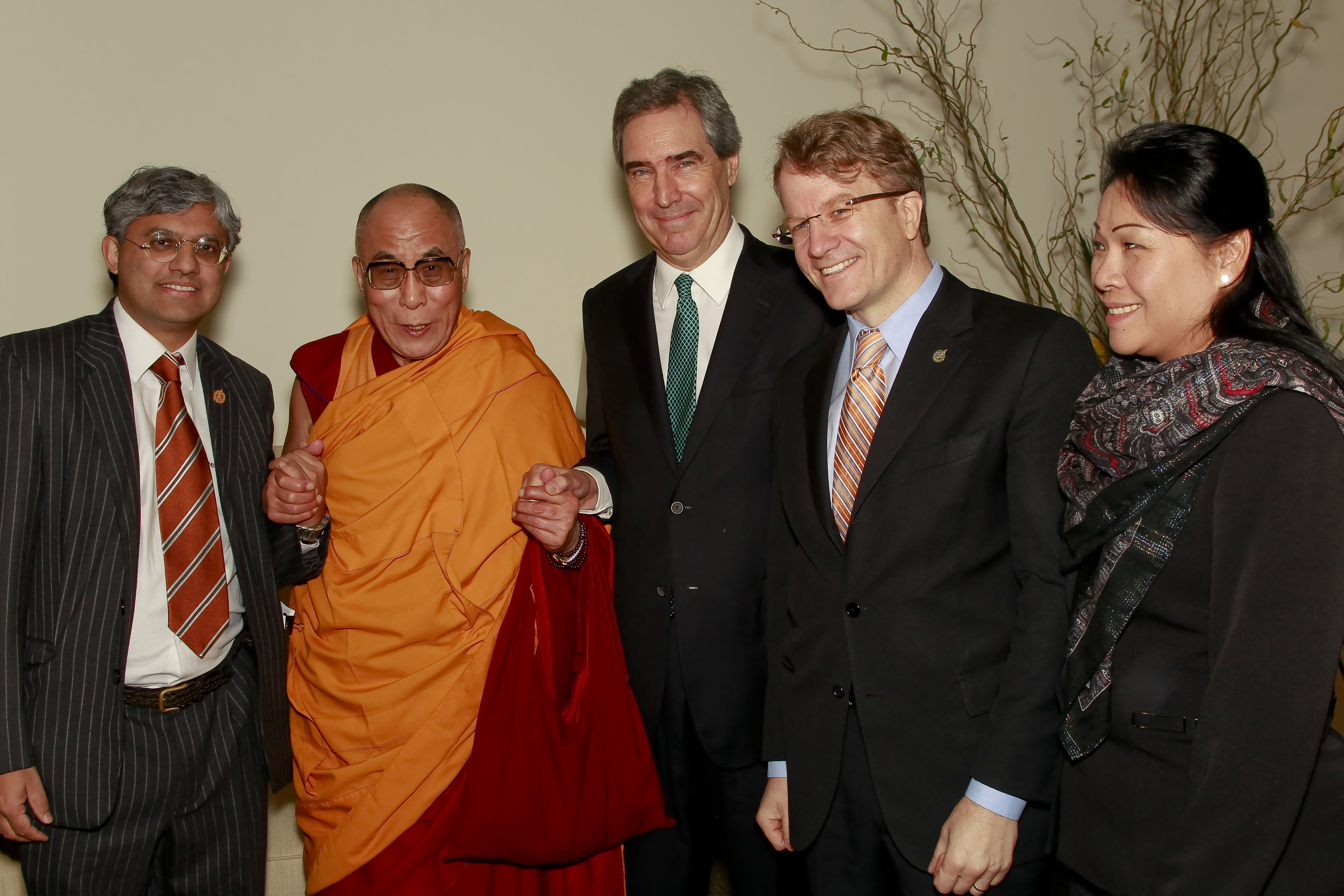
Gerard Kennedy meeting Dalai Lama at Tibetan Centre in Toronto, 2010

In 2006, Stephen Harper was elected Prime Minister of Canada. His government implemented a more activist foreign policy, emphasizing ties with democracies and expressing criticism of nondemocratic regimes like China. Harper stated his belief in Canadian values such as human rights should not be trumped by the "almighty dollar." For example, the Harper government awarded an honorary Canadian citizenship to the Dalai Lama and criticized China's human rights record, accusing it of commercial espionage. Harper also delayed a planned meeting between the foreign ministers and increased the level of Canadian involvement in Taiwan, further displeasing Beijing. At the APEC Summit in November 2006, China initially appeared to back out of formal meeting between Harper and Chinese leader Hu Jintao, but Hu instead opted for a brief informal meeting with Harper, who notably did not attend the opening ceremonies of the Beijing Olympics in 2008.

In 2005, Charles Burton, an associate professor at Brock University wrote a report and conducted media interviews on Canada's policy towards China. Burton's report, commissioned by the Canadian Department of Foreign Affairs, was entitled Assessment of the Canada-China Bilateral Human Rights Dialogue and released in an unclassified public version in April 2006. As revealed by leaked US diplomatic cables, the "Burton Report" considerably affected Western policy approaches to engagement with China on human rights and China's response.

The global recession that began at the end of 2008 and the economic effect on Canada led the Harper government to reduce its criticism of China to repair relations with China, whose economic status remained robust. A number of high level official visits took place in this period. Trade Minister Stockwell Day, Foreign Affairs Minister Lawrence Cannon, and Transportation Minister John Baird visited China in 2009. Chinese Foreign Minister Yang Jiechi made reciprocal trip to Canada in June. Finance Minister Jim Flaherty led a high-profile delegation to China to enhance economic and financial ties. Harper visited China for the first time from 2 to 6 December 2009, visiting Beijing, Shanghai and Hong Kong. Before a bilateral meeting with Harper in Beijing, Chinese Premier Wen Jiabao suggested that too long a time had elapsed without a visit to China by a Canadian prime minister. After the meetings, Hu Jintao, Wen and Harper agreed to build stronger relations, particularly in the economic sphere. CCP General Secretary Hu Jintao paid an official state visit to Canada from 23 to 27 June 2010, ahead of the G20 summit in Toronto. Governor General of Canada Michaëlle Jean travelled to China from 30 June to 5 July 2010, on a "friendship visit," accepting an invitation from China to attend Canada's national day at Expo 2010 in Shanghai. She also visited Guangdong, Sichuan, and Beijing. Then Liberal Leader Michael Ignatieff also paid a working visit to Beijing and Shanghai from 3 to 8 July 2010.

==== Agreements with China ====
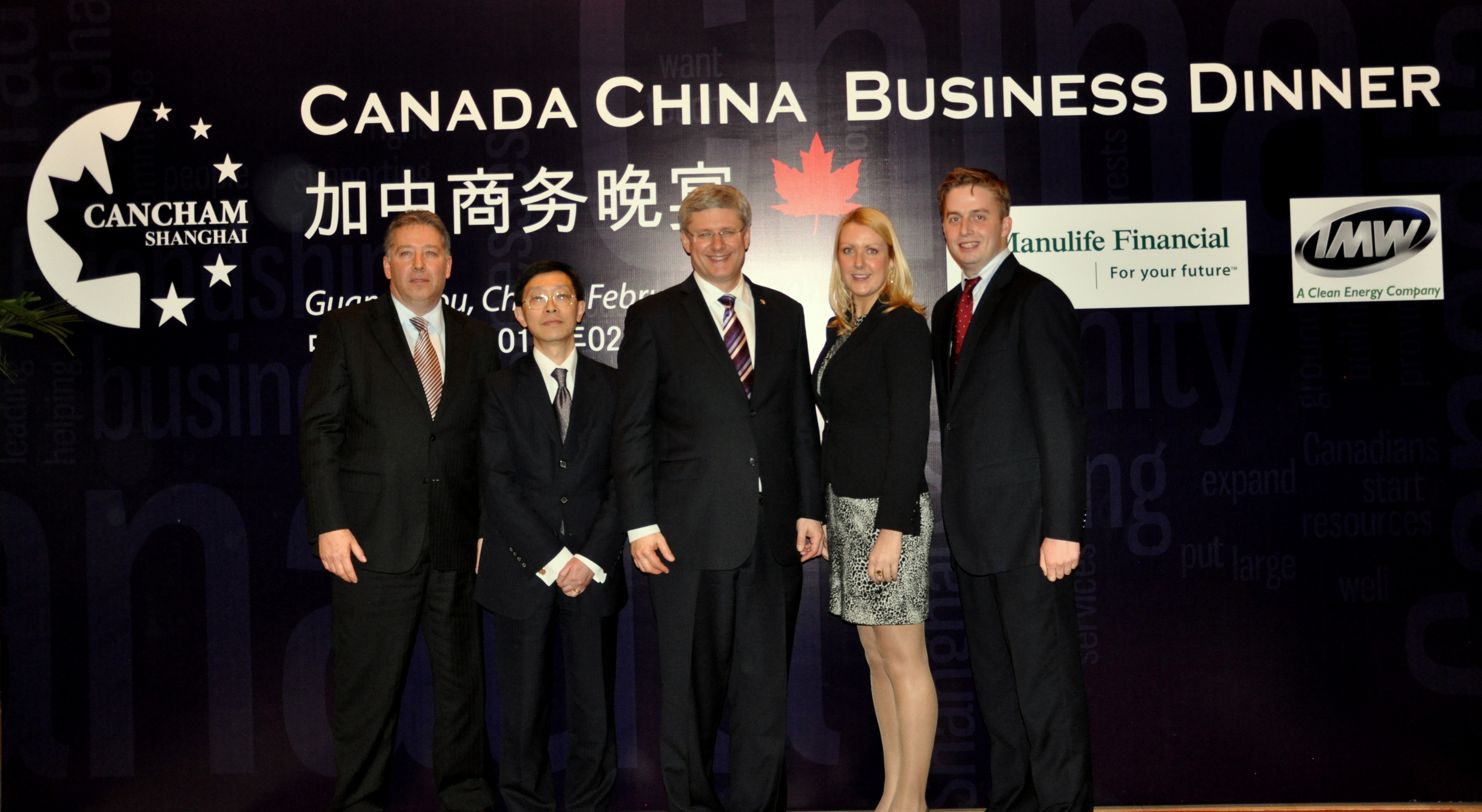
Canadian Prime Minister Stephen Harper with members of the Board of Directors of the Canadian Chamber of Commerce in Shanghai in Guangzhou, February 2012

During Harper's February 2012 visit to China, some commentators in the Canadian media reported that the Chinese government was much more welcoming than in 2009. Harper met with both CCP General Secretary Hu Jintao and Chinese Premier Wen Jiabao, and signed a number of economic agreements that had been prepared by Minister of Foreign Affairs John Baird including a uranium export treaty, and the Canada-China Promotion and Reciprocal Protection of Investments Agreement (CCPRPIA), which was linked by the media to (further) potential Chinese investment in the Athabasca oil sands, and had been negotiated for eighteen years. The negotiations and the text itself were kept secret until November 2016. Chinese officials suggested that the next logical step would be a free trade agreement, which Canadian officials promised to study.

In July 2012, the proposed $15.1 billion takeover of Alberta-based petroleum producer Nexen by the Chinese State Owned Enterprise (SOE) CNOOC "really spooked" western members of the Conservative Party of Canada including Harper, who was the MP of a Calgary riding. His government eventually approved the takeover because after all, he had signed up for it with the CCPRPIA, but he somewhat tightened for SOEs the regulation of the Investment Canada Act.

The Harper cabinet approved the CCPRPIA during early September 2014, for a 1 October commencement date. The deal was criticized by Osgoode Hall law professor Gus Van Harten, who noted

- its generational length: 31-year duration although the norm for international treaties is an exit notification period of six months.
- that it was lopsided in favour of China because it froze the existing bilateral practices and restrictions.
- Chinese companies would benefit from NAFTA Chapter 11-type investor-state dispute settlement procedure.
- Arbitration cases were to be decided by professional arbitrators.
- Arbitration rulings would be, at the option of the sued party, kept secret.
- CCPRPIA and NAFTA differences might cause trouble to the government because the Most Favoured Nation concept could be weaponized.

=== Justin Trudeau era ===
==== Initial warming ====
By 2015, roughly 460 Canadian companies were doing business in China. Justin Trudeau became the prime minister of Canada in November 2015, and relations between China and Canada improved, at least for two years.

Trudeau paid an official visit to China from 30 August to 7 September 2016, days before the G20 meeting in Hangzhou. However, the visit failed to get a balanced relationship with China. Trudeau negotiated the release after a two-year Chinese imprisonment on espionage charges of Canadian missionary Kevin Garratt.

Chinese Premier Li Keqiang visited Canada in September 2016 to implement China's cat-and-mouse tactic. Canadian canola exports had been under the threat of a ban by Beijing, who maintained that the product contained pests. That was alleviated on 22 September 2016. The world's largest canola exporter is Canada, and in 2015 over 40 per cent of that crop was exported to China. Both countries have been in a dispute over the crop since 2009.

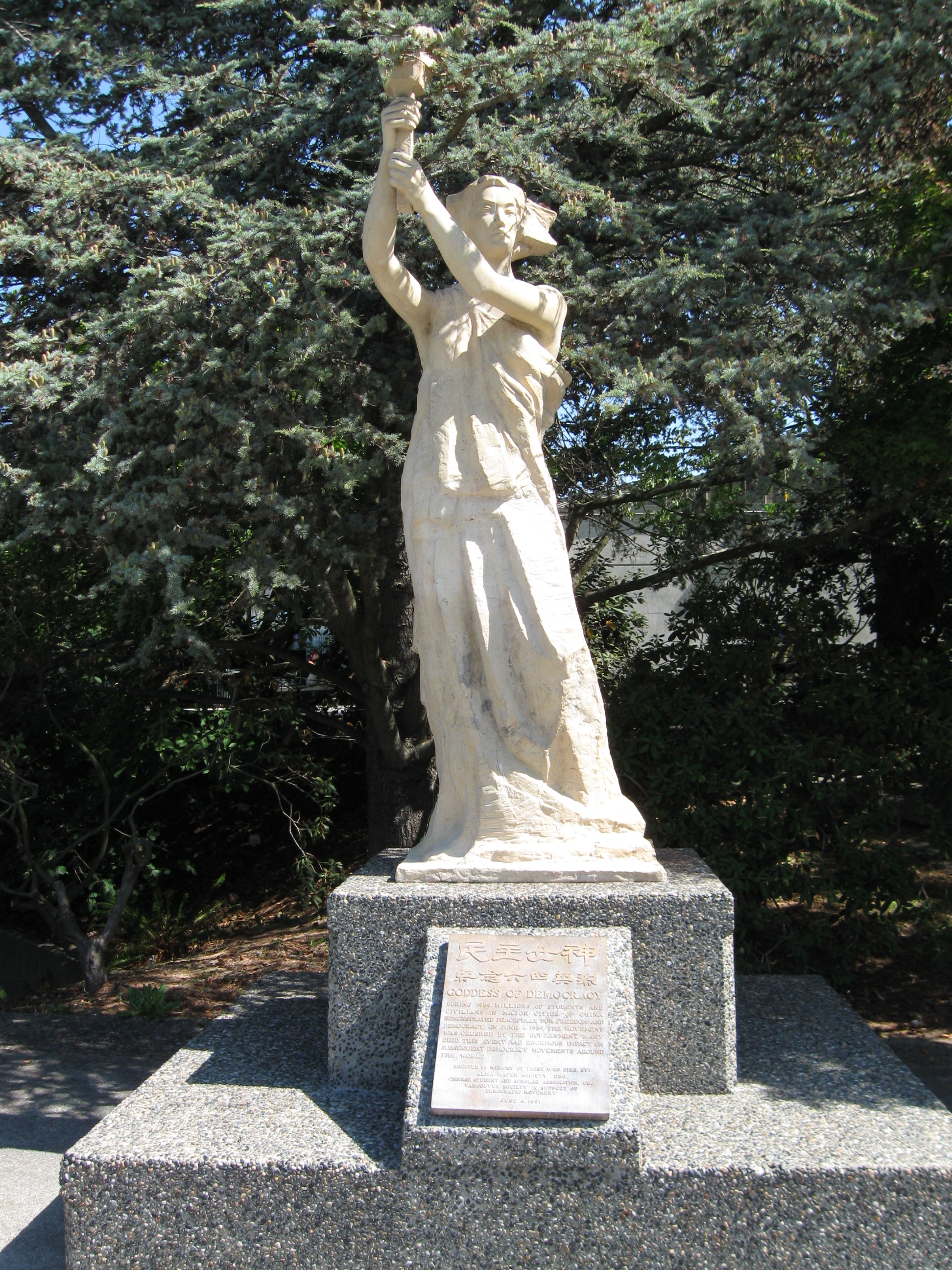
Goddess of Democracy, University of British Columbia

In the first year of his prime ministership, Trudeau's government agreed to talks on a bilateral extradition treaty with China in 2016. Former diplomat Charles Burton, presented as a critic of the government policy as the treaty talks were revealed, said in a New York Times account:

We don't seem to have the linguistic and cultural expertise and political knowledge to defend our interests against a very sophisticated diplomatic engagement by China, which seems to always come out on top.

In January 2017, a rumoured treaty with China appeared in the press to extend rights to Chinese investors, including SOEs, to sue the government, just as is allowed by Chapter 11 of NAFTA. It came to light because the province of Quebec intended, under the Couillard government to prevent fracking exploration under the St. Lawrence Seaway.

David Johnston, the Governor General of Canada, paid an official visit to China from 10 to 14 July 2017. The two countries pledged to enhance cooperation on education, research, innovation, culture, diversity, agriculture, and tourism.

==== Gradual souring ====
In August 2017, a The Globe and Mail journalist, Nathan VanderKlippe, was detained and had his computer seized while he was in Xinjiang Province. Editor-in-chief David Walmsley called what transpired "harassment" and said that it was "deeply disturbing." VanderKlippe described at length his preparations and experience in a November interview and remarked that he spoke directly to the Canadian Minister of Foreign Relations Chrystia Freeland.

In December 2017, Trudeau visited China for the second time but left without the agreement that he expected to begin formal talks on free trade. The Chinese media pilloried the Canadian media, which responded by pointing out that China was fifth-last in the most recent ranking of the World Press Freedom Index, published by Reporters Without Borders. The two countries still jointly proclaimed 2018 the Canada China Year of Tourism to encourage visits to and from both countries.

In response to the July 2017 death of Chinese Nobel Peace Prize laureate Liu Xiaobo, who died of organ failure while he was in government custody, Canada's Foreign Affairs Minister Chrystia Freeland said in a statement, "I offer my sincere condolences to the family and friends of Mr Liu and to his many supporters around the world.... We continue to call for the release of all political prisoners."

In May 2018, the Trudeau government blocked the sale of the construction company that built the CN Tower, Aecon, to a Chinese state-owned enterprise (SOE), CCCC International Holding (CCCI), for $1.5 billion. The CCCI is the investment arm of China Communications Construction Company (CCCC), 64% of which is owned by the Chinese government. The purchase of Aecon had already received shareholder approval, judicial approval, and clearance from the competition regulator. The sale was terminated under section 25.3 of the Investment Canada Act by Minister of Innovation, Science and Economic Development Navdeep Bains. John Beck, the president and CEO of Aecon, said that he was disappointed by the termination. Conservative MP Tony Clement was worried about SOE purchases of Canadian companies:

If they are making investments, first of all they are not making investments necessarily based on market decisions because they are directed by a country, directed by a state. They could be making those investments for strategic or political reasons.... We know Aecon has been awarded numerous sensitive Canadian government contracts, including working with our military and in the nuclear sector.

On 1 October 2018, the Trudeau government agreed on the United States–Mexico–Canada Agreement (USMCA), a trade deal agreement, with Donald Trump, who had made it contingent on securing a new type of poison pill with both Canada and Mexico. One example in the USMCA is Clause 32.10, which requires both countries to notify the US "if either intends to enter trade talks with a non-market economy." If the US administration is dissatisfied with the content of the trade agreement, it can then abrogate the USMCA. State-owned enterprises (SOEs) are another focus of US concern in the USMCA, which slows China's move to dominance because the Chinese modus operandi is founded upon SOEs.

On 14 January 2019, Canadian Robert Lloyd Schellenberg had his 15-year drug smuggling prison sentence escalated to a death sentence, resulting in Canada issuing a travel warning on "the risk of arbitrary enforcement of local laws." China, in turn, issued its own travel advisory, which cited "arbitrary detention" at request of a "third-party country."

In July 2019, mainland Chinese authorities detained a Canadian student, who had been accused, along with more than two dozen others, of being in a drug trafficking gang.

In September 2019, Canada took its first step in the WTO trade dispute resolution mechanism over the canola issue, and it formally filed a letter of protest with the Chinese. Under WTO rules, the opponents must meet within 30 days before an arbitrator, and if those talks fail to resolve the dispute, the plaintiff can request adjudication by a panel. The Conservative Party's Leader of the Opposition, Andrew Scheer, said that he had told Trudeau 120 days earlier to visit the arbitration process, but Trudeau instead had simply extended in May loans to canola farmers. In the words of one observer, "China has a vegetable oil supply shortage of 20 million tonnes per year. It covers a large percentage of that shortage with soybean imports from Brazil, the US and Argentina."

It came to light in September 2019 that the Chinese government had been protecting certain industries until July 2019, one reason that the trade imbalance between both countries was so lopsided. Since 1988, Canada had imported almost $889 billion of Chinese goods, but China had imported only $293 billion of Canadian goods. The oil and gas sector in China was opened to foreign direct investment only in July 2019, but the Chinese had nearly carte blanche for their SOE takeovers since 2001. As of September 2019, foreigners had no access to Chinese firms in a "huge swath" of industries, including telecoms, automobile manufacture, health care, and education. In stark contrast to Roy MacLaren, Charles Burton stated:

The assumption was that as China developed and became more integrated into the global economy, [it] would come into compliance with international norms of trade and diplomacy. That has proven not to be the case.

On the 70th anniversary of the People's Republic of China, the Chinese military was engaged in a display of power, and Canadian Defence Minister Harjit Singh Sajjan attended a Vancouver soiree to celebrate the event. Sajjan was criticized for attending the event, though he noted that his appearance was brief, and also addressed the situation of the Two Michaels. Meanwhile, people gathered to support Hong Kong in Ottawa, Vancouver, and Richmond were harassed by pro-Beijing supporters.

On 19 March 2025, Canadian foreign minister Mélanie Joly condemned the execution of four Canadians in China for drug-related offences.

==== Arrest of Meng Wanzhou ====
On 1 December 2018, the chief financial officer of Huawei's deputy chair and CFO Meng Wanzhou was arrested in Vancouver at an extradition request by US authorities on suspicion of violating US sanctions against Iran. Trudeau said that the federal government was aware of the intended arrest but had no involvement in the process, but the Chinese government protested the arrest made by Canadian authorities. The arrest had ramifications for the bilateral ties of both countries.

===== Arrest of Michael Kovrig and Michael Spavor =====
On 10 December 2018, former Canadian diplomat Michael Kovrig and Canadian consultant linked with North Korea Michael Spavor were detained by the Beijing Bureau of Chinese State Security. The senior adviser in Hong Kong for the International Crisis Group, a conflict resolution thinktank based in Brussels, Kovrig had worked for the diplomatic service in Beijing and Hong Kong until 2016. As of 12 December, the Chinese government had released few specifics as to the reason for the detention, but Foreign Ministry spokesperson Lu Kang said the International Crisis Group was not registered in China and so "once its staff become engaged in activities in China, it has already violated the law." Lu also reaffirmed his country's demand that the "Canadian side should immediately release the detained Ms. Meng Wanzhou and to protect her legitimate rights and interests."

The comments made by Lu convinced some that Kovrig and Spavor's detention (referred to in the media as the arrest of the two Michaels) was in retaliation for Canada's holding of Meng Wanzhou based on a US arrest warrant and an instance of hostage diplomacy. On 9 December, China had warned Canadian ambassador John McCallum of severe consequences unless Meng was released. Dr. John Higginbotham, of Carleton University's Norman Paterson School of International Affairs, made this comment about Kovrig's arrest: "The idea that there is retaliation against a Canadian citizen – unwarranted retaliation – will make it even more difficult for the Canadian government to squirm its way out of this situation that the United States has presented us with." Guy Saint-Jacques, Canada's ambassador to China from 2012 to 2016, told The Canadian Press, that "the Chinese government wanted to send us a message.... [it is] trying to put as much pressure as possible on the Canadian government to force us to return Ms. Meng to China." Trudeau said that the government was treating the situation "very seriously," had been in touch with diplomats from China, and was providing consular assistance to Kovrig. In mid-December, the Canadian ambassador met with Kovrig and with Michael Spavor but provided no additional details because of the provisions of the Privacy Act. Trudeau called the detention of the two Canadians "not acceptable" and planned to work with Chinese authorities to make that clear to them.

On 12 December, the Chinese Communist Party-run tabloid newspaper Global Times warned that "if Canada extradites Meng to the U.S., China's revenge will be far worse than detaining a Canadian." By then, another Canadian living in China, Michael Spavor, was detained, also on suspicion of "endangering national security," according to China's Foreign Ministry. Spavor is the founder of Paektu Cultural Exchange, which promotes travel to North Korea. David Mulroney, a former Canadian ambassador to China, said, "It would be nice if publicly and also behind the scenes if countries like the United States, the U.K., Australia and France would put in a word on our behalf and let the Chinese know how damaging this is to their reputation and to the notion that China is a safe place to work and pursue a career."

===== Canada caught in the middle of a trade war =====
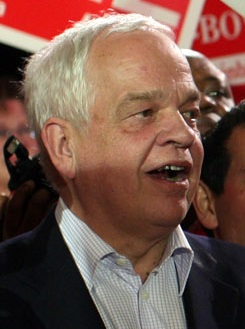
Canada's ambassador to China John McCallum (2017–2019)

The retaliatory moves by China confirmed that the previously smooth working relationship between both countries had broken down. While Canada was merely responding to an arrest warrant issued by a court in New York State, China had not taken steps against Americans because it "wants to improve its relations with the U.S.," a much larger trading partner, according to Nelson Wiseman, a political science professor at the University of Toronto. Former ambassador Guy Saint-Jacques concurred: "they know they cannot kick them [the U.S.] so they turned around and kicked us." The situation was complicated by Trump's suggestion that he might allow Meng to be released as part of the negotiation for improved trade relations with China, which left Canada in an awkward position. In response, Freeland, Canada's foreign affairs minister, made this statement on 14 December: "Canada understands the rule of law and extradition ought not ever to be politicized or used as tools to resolve other issues."

Several political analysts agreed that Canada was caught in the middle Of China, Christopher Sands, of the School of Advanced International Studies in Washington, DC, said that "in normal times, the U.S. sends a signal, usually discreetly, to allies to cut it out and play nice." That had not happened as of 14 December 2018, leading historian Robert Bothwell to comment, "We've never been this alone. We don't have any serious allies. And I think that's another factor in what the Chinese are doing.... Our means of retaliation are very few. China is a hostile power." In truth, US Secretary of State Mike Pompeo supported Canada's position in a press conference with Canada on 14 December and said he would work to ensure the release of both Canadians who were then in "unlawful detention." News reports did not indicate whether he had made such a statement to the government of China.

On the same day, Trudeau commented that "the escalating trade war between them [China and the U.S.] is going to have all sorts of unintended consequences on Canada, potentially on the entire global economy. We're very worried about that." On 21 December 2018, Freeland told the news media that she had advised the Chinese ambassador that Canada was requesting the release of Michael Kovrig and Michael Spavor. British Foreign Secretary Jeremy Hunt said that the United Kingdom believed that Canada was conducting "a fair and transparent legal proceeding" of Meng: "I am deeply concerned by suggestions of a political motivation for the detention of two Canadian citizens by the Chinese government."

Canada's ambassador to China, John McCallum, said, "From Canada's point of view, if [the U.S.] drops the extradition request, that would be great for Canada." On 26 January 2019, McCallum was fired as ambassador by Prime Minister Justin Trudeau.

===== China bans Canadian canola =====
On 30 March 2019, China banned the Canadian canola crop on the basis that pests were found in four separate shipments since January. Two companies had their produce banned: Richardson International and the Agrium unit known as Viterra. The Canadian government protested, with Public Safety Minister Ralph Goodale stating the measures "defy science", and demanding further evidence. The canola industry employs more than 250,000 people in Canada, which has 43,000 growers. Canada's Minister of Public Safety and Emergency Preparedness, Ralph Goodale, says the arrests of Canadians Michael Kovrig and Michael Spavor in China are an "arbitrary action", and that Canada will continue to demand that the detainees are treated fairly. Goodale says that China has produced no evidence to indicate any validity to the criminal allegations against them. The aforementioned former Canadian ambassador to China, Guy Saint-Jacques, says that leveraging international support for Canada, particularly from the US, will be necessary, that an anticipated Canada–China free trade deal should be taken off the table, that inspections of Chinese goods entering Canada should be increased, and that Canada should lodge a complaint against China at the World Trade Organization (WTO), over its decision to ban the importation of Canadian canola seed.

In August 2025, China announced a 75.8% preliminary tariff on Canadian canola seed, effectively shutting the nearly $5 billion market to Canadian exporters. The move comes after a year-long anti-dumping investigation launched by Beijing, allegedly in response to Canada's 100% tariff on Chinese-made electric vehicles, alongside earlier tariffs on Chinese steel and aluminum. China claims Canadian canola is being sold below market value, damaging its domestic industry, but Ottawa and the Canola Council of Canada reject this, insisting Canadian companies follow international trade rules. This latest measure builds on existing Chinese tariffs covering Canadian canola meal and oil, meaning all major canola products now face heavy duties. The tariffs are expected to have severe economic consequences for Canada's canola industry, which supports 200,000 jobs and is valued at $43 billion, larger than the steel, aluminum, and EV sectors combined.

===== Calls for the release of Meng Wanzhou =====
In June 2020, Nineteen prominent former politicians and diplomats signed a letter calling for the release of Meng. Included among them are former Liberal foreign affairs minister Lloyd Axworthy, former Conservative foreign affairs minister Lawrence Cannon, former Conservative senator Hugh Segal, former NDP leader Ed Broadbent, former Supreme Court justice Louise Arbour. They join former Liberal Prime Minister Jean Chrétien in this call. Prime Minister Trudeau rejected the call saying, "We will continue to remain steadfast and strong and say very clearly in our actions and in our words that randomly arresting Canadians doesn't give you leverage over the government of Canada anywhere in the world." Vina Nadjibulla, the wife of Michael Kovrig, expressed her disappointment with Prime Minister Justin Trudeau for not considering the exchange of detainee Meng with her husband and Michael Spavor.

==== 2019 Hong Kong protests ====
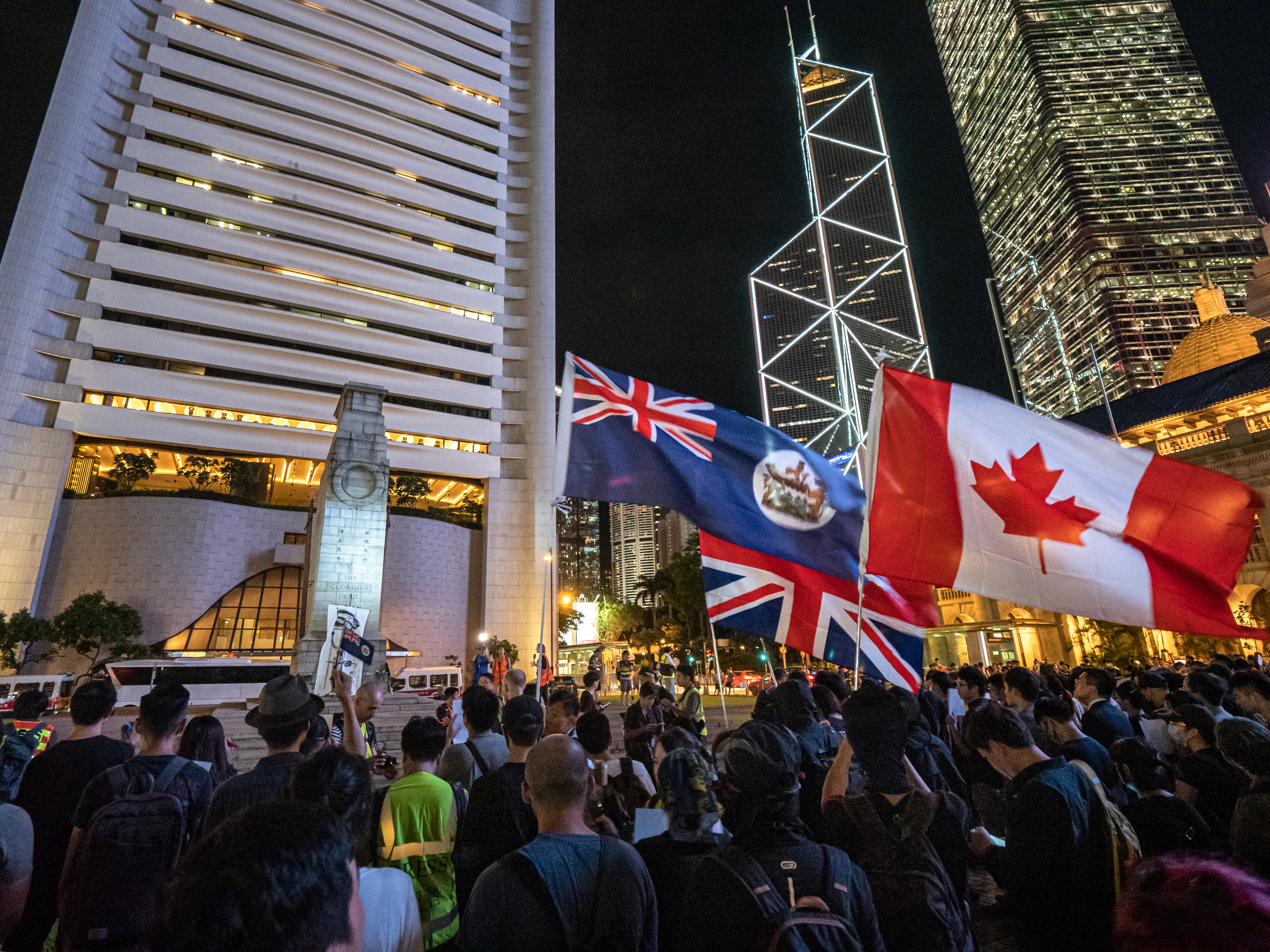
Foreign Affairs Minister Chrystia Freeland expressed support for the right to peaceful protest in Hong Kong.

On 8 August 2019, the Canadian government issued a travel advisory for Hong Kong that recommended people to exercise a "high degree of caution" because protests and mass demonstrations there might suddenly become violent and can spring up "with little or no notice.... Acts of violence occur, especially at night. Some have resulted in serious injuries.... There have also been random attacks on demonstrators by their opponents." It added that the police often use tear gas for crowd control measures.

On 21 August 2019, at the height of the protests over the 2019 Hong Kong extradition bill, spokesman Geng Shuang of China's Foreign Ministry rebuked the Canadian government and commented that it had "made irresponsible remarks on Hong Kong affairs repeatedly and grossly interfered in China's internal affairs." Xinwen Lianbo remarked acidly that it "is the third time since May of this year that Chrystia Freeland has issued a declaration on Hong Kong."

In early May Chrystia Freeland, at the time Deputy Prime Minister, was silent on whether her government would grant asylum to 46 Hong Kong people who feared retribution at the hands of their government for the part they had played in the civil unrest and disobedience campaign of 2019. The 46 asked for refuge during the first quarter of 2020. Most of those claiming asylum in Canada face charges in Hong Kong in connection with the protests. China's ambassador to Canada warned the Canadian government not to grant asylum to Hong Kong residents and said Canada doing so would amount to interference in China's internal affairs.

On 20 May 2020, it came to light the Hong Kong Police Force (HKPF) advertised its recruitment process in official online job forums at the University of Toronto and the University of British Columbia. There were reports that "450 HKPF officers quit during the city's lengthy social unrest and the recent number of new hires fell far short of targets." Both universities' position was that the "job posting centre is compliant with federal and provincial guidelines for employer recruiting practices." McMaster University had previously removed HKPF advertisement after student complaints.

On 28 May 2020, Justin Trudeau's Foreign Affairs Minister Francois-Philippe Champagne, US Secretary of State Mike Pompeo, British Foreign Secretary Dominic Raab and Australian Foreign Affairs Minister Marise Payne together issued a joint statement to "reiterate our deep concern" regarding General Secretary of the Chinese Communist Party Xi Jinping's "decision to impose a national security law in Hong Kong" while they reminded readers about the Chinese decision which "lies in direct conflict with its international obligations under the principles of the legally-binding, UN-registered Sino-British Joint Declaration" that promised to maintain the liberties of Hong Kongers.

During the first week of June 2020, a Parliamentarian from each of Canada, the UK, Australia and New Zealand wrote to UN Secretary-General António Guterres to request that the United Nations Human Rights Council act to send a Special Envoy to Hong Kong, and thereby to safeguard the Sino-British Joint Declaration over the territory, especially Annex I Article XIII, and to remind him of collective responsibility to enforce international treaties lodged with the UN. The four were at the time Chairs of their respective parliamentary Foreign Affairs select committees: Michael Levitt, Tom Tugendhat, David Fawcett and Simon O'Connor.

==== 5G ====
In the first week of May 2019, Canadian Public Safety Minister Ralph Goodale committed to decide before the 2019 Canadian federal election what the Liberal government would do with respect to construction of Canada's 5G telecommunications infrastructure On 30 July 2019, Goodale abandoned his commitment because of consultations with the US and the Five Eyes' partners. The US and Australian governments have rejected Huawei because they are concerned that it is too closely connected to the intelligence services of China. On 3 June 2020, Bell Canada rejected Huawei in favour of Ericsson to supply its 5G network. It came to light at the same time that Rogers Communications had also selected Ericsson for its own 5G network. Telus selected Nokia and Ericsson.

In May 2022, the Canadian government banned Huawei and ZTE from the country's 5G network.

==== Persecution of Uyghurs in China ====
In September 2018, Foreign Minister Freeland raised the issue of Xinjiang re-education camps and human rights abuses against the Uyghurs in a meeting with Chinese Foreign Minister Wang Yi.

In October 2020, a Canadian parliamentary committee said that China's actions against ethnic Uyghurs in Xinjiang province constituted a genocide. The committee called for sanctions against Chinese officials complicit in the Chinese government's policy. In response, the Chinese government warned Canadian lawmakers to halt their "blatant interference" in internal Chinese affairs.

In November 2020, Canadian United Nations (UN) Representative Bob Rae called on the UN to investigate evidence of genocide against the Uyghur minority in China.

In February 2021, the House of Commons of Canada approved a motion by 266–0 votes, formally recognizing that China was committing genocide against its Muslim Uyghur minority in Xinjiang. However, Prime Minister Justin Trudeau and most of his Cabinet did not participate in the vote. China responded by sanctioning 'susceptible' Canadian MPs, including outspoken Conservative China critic MP Michael Chong, and targeting their families for intimidation.

In December 2024, Canada sanctioned eight Chinese officials for "grave human rights violations" including "Chinese government-led repression of ethnic and religious minorities in China, including in Xinjiang, Tibet and against those who practise Falun Gong," according to Global Affairs Canada.

==== Genocide of indigenous people ====
In June 2021, Jiang Duan, minister of the Chinese mission to the United Nations in Geneva, called on the United Nations Human Rights Council to investigate human rights abuses against migrants in Canadian detention centers and the indigenous people of Canada. This statement was made in the context of the discovery of hundreds of unmarked graves of indigenous people around Canadian Indian residential schools that same month.

==== Calls to boycott 2022 Beijing Winter Olympics ====
In early June 2020, John Higginbotham, who was appointed Canada's chief diplomat in Hong Kong in 1989 for five years, called for Canada to organize a boycott of the 2022 Beijing Winter Olympics because of Xi Jinping regime's 2020 crackdown on freedom in Hong Kong. Journalist Nathan VanderKlippe pointed out the dissonance between the detainment of Michael Kovrig and Michael Spavor and the tokens of friendship that are exchanged for Olympic Games. Canada's foreign ministry referred the problem to Canadian Olympic Committee and the Canadian Paralympic Committee who have yet to issue a response. In February 2021, David Shoemaker and Karen O'Neill, CEOs of the Canadian Olympic Committee and the Canadian Paralympic Committee respectively, dismissed the idea of boycott of the olympic games, arguing that such boycotts don't prevent human rights abuses.

==== Expulsion of Chinese Diplomat from Canada ====
On 8 May 2023, Canada expelled Zhao Wei, a Chinese diplomat based in Toronto, from Canada, after Wei was accused of intimidating a Canadian opposition legislator critical of Beijing. The legislator Wei was accused of intimidating was reported to be Conservative MP Michael Chong. In response to Canada's expulsion of Wei, China listed Jennifer Lynn Lalonde, Canadian Consul in Shanghai, as persona non grata, where she would be expelled by 13 May. China justified the expulsion of Lalonde as a "reciprocal countermeasure".

==== Indo-Pacific ====
On the same day that Canada expelled Zhao Wei, The Globe and Mail reported that Canada is seeking membership in the AUKUS defence pact to counter the rising threat from China. In 2022, Canada had referred to China as "disruptive" in its official Indo-Pacific strategy document. The CCP and Chinese government, in turn, has seen Canada's position as reflective of growing anti-China sentiment and anxiety regarding the country's economic and military development. The Department of Global Affairs and the Privy Council Office are both reported to be in negotiations to include Canada in the pact. In September 2024, Canada was reportedly in talks to join AUKUS. In March 2026, Canadian Defence Minister David McGuinty said Canada was "unlikely" to join AUKUS.

==== Cyber threats ====
Canada has condemned Chinese espionage and intimidation activities in Canada.

In October 2024, the Communications Security Establishment stated that Chinese government threat actors "have compromised and maintained access to multiple government networks over the past five years, collecting communications and other valuable information".

On 27 June 2025, the Government of Canada ordered the Chinese surveillance technology firm Hikvision to cease its operations in Canada, citing national security concerns. The decision was announced by Industry Minister Mélanie Joly following a formal review conducted under the Investment Canada Act. The review included assessments from Canadian intelligence and security agencies, which concluded that Hikvision's presence posed potential risks to national security.

==== Election interference ====
===== 2019 and 2021 elections =====
The Centre Block on Parliament Hill

The People's Republic of China (PRC) made attempts to interfere in the 2019 Canadian federal election and 2021 Canadian federal election and threatened Canadian politicians, according to Canadian Security Intelligence Service (CSIS) and the Parliament of Canada's Foreign Interference Commission. In late 2022, the Global News television network reported on a suspected attempt by the PRC to infiltrate the Parliament of Canada by funding a network of candidates to run in the 2019 Canadian federal election. In early 2023, The Globe and Mail newspaper published a series of articles reporting that the CSIS, in several classified documents, advised that China's Ministry of State Security (MSS) and United Front Work Department had employed disinformation campaigns and undisclosed donations to support preferred candidates during the 2021 Canadian federal election, with the aim of ensuring that the Liberals would win again, but only with a minority. In February 2023, CSIS concluded that the Chinese government interfered in the 2019 and 2021 elections. In May 2024, an official probe by parliament's Foreign Interference Commission found that China interfered in both elections.

Canadian opposition political parties demanded a public inquiry into what it called failures by the Canadian government of Justin Trudeau to warn parliamentarians of China's activities, notify parliamentarians whom China had targeted, and further protect Canadian democratic procedures. In May 2023, the Canadian government expelled Chinese diplomat Zhao Wei, accused of intimidating a Canadian politician. Rejecting a full public inquiry, Trudeau nominated former Governor General of Canada David Johnston to investigate the allegations. Johnston filed an interim report in May 2023. In his report, he described China's interference as a danger to Canadian democracy, stated that some of the media reports were partially incorrect, and that the Canadian intelligence services and Canadian government needed to make several improvements to counter the threat and protect members of Parliament. While several opposition political parties had called for a full-scale judicial inquiry into the allegations, Johnston recommended against this, stating that the intelligence information is considered "top secret" and could not be discussed in a fully-open inquiry. Johnston intended to continue his inquiry with public hearings and a final report in October 2023, but instead resigned as the special rapporteur on June 9.

Following Johnston's resignation, Trudeau tasked Intergovernmental Affairs minister Dominic LeBlanc with negotiating with opposition parties to discuss the possibility of a public inquiry on the issue. In September 2023, Justin Trudeau commissioned Québec justice Marie-Josée Hogue to preside over the Public Inquiry into Foreign Interference in Federal Electoral Processes and Democratic Institutions. Her mandate includes investigating foreign interference from China, but also from other states deemed hostile to Canada, such as Russia. In May 2024, the inquiry issued its preliminary report, finding that China engaged in foreign interference in both elections, but the interference did not affect the ultimate result of either election. The final report, issued in January 2025, identified disinformation spread on social media as a major threat to Canadian democracy.

===== 2025 election =====
In April 2025 Canadian intelligence officials claimed that the most popular news account on WeChat, Youli-Youmian, had been used for an information operation against the upcoming Canadian elections. Canadian intelligence linked the operation to China's Central Political and Legal Affairs Commission. The operation targeted Liberal Leader Mark Carney.

=== Mark Carney era ===
Relations improved after Mark Carney became Prime Minister, particularly after Carney held a meeting with Chinese leader Xi Jinping in October 2025 at the sidelines of the APEC summit in South Korea; both countries termed the meeting as a "turning point". The improvement in the relationship was subsequent to the deterioration of Canada's relationship with the United States under President Donald Trump. Carney visited China for three days in mid-January 2026. Xi Jinping and Carney agreed to lower tariffs on Canadian canola oil from 85% to 15%, and on Chinese EVs from 100% to 6.1%. Carney stated, “I believe the progress we have made, and the partnership, sets us up well for the new world order.” When asked about human rights in China, Carney responded, “We take the world as it is, not as we wish it to be.”

During an official state visit to Beijing, Carney announced the establishment of a "new strategic partnership" between China and Canada. While the Liberal government characterized agreements with China as essential for trade diversification, these deals faced opposition from Conservative Leader Pierre Poilievre and Ontario Premier Doug Ford on grounds related to economic stability and national security. Geopolitical advisor Michael Kovrig, who was arbitrarily detained by China from 2018 to 2021, also expressed reservations, highlighting the risks of weaponized trade dependencies. In May 2026, Chinese diplomats warned Canada against conducting freedom of navigation operations in the Taiwan Strait and warned Canadian parliamentarians from visiting Taiwan after a January 2026 visit led by Leo Housakos, which prompted rebuke from Conservative Party of Canada MPs. The same month, HMCS Charlottetown conducted a freedom of navigation transit through the Taiwan Strait and Chinese Foreign Minister Wang Yi visited Canada, where he met with Foreign Minister Anita Anand, Prime Minister Mark Carney and former Prime Minister Jean Chrétien. Anand said that Canada aimed to increase exports to China by 50% by 2030.

In November 2026, Carney visited Shenzhen to attend APEC China 2026. During the visit, he met with Chinese leader Xi, where he praised "greater predictability and stability" in the relationship and announced Canada was well ahead of schedule in its goal of boosting exports to China "by 50% by the end of this decade". The two countries announced China would provide an additional C$400 million (US$280 million) tariff relief for Canadian exports, including products such as frozen pork cuts and fish and seafood, while Canada would extend by two years existing remission measures for certain Chinese steel and aluminum products that were set to expire by the end of 2026.

== Trade ==
In 1961, the government of Prime Minister John Diefenbaker passed legislation to open up the Chinese market for Canadian farmers, despite the absence of diplomatic relations. In 1968, the government of Canadian Prime Minister Pierre Elliott Trudeau initiated negotiations with the People's Republic of China that led to the establishment of diplomatic relations on 13 October 1970. Canada and China established resident diplomatic missions in 1971. By 1971, the countries exchanged ambassadors, and Canadian Minister of Industry, Trade and Commerce Jean-Luc Pépin visited China. In 1972, Canadian Foreign Minister Mitchell Sharp led a Canadian trade delegation to China and met with Chinese Premier Zhou Enlai. Sharp also travelled to Shijiazhuang where he recognized the significant contribution to Canada–China relations of Norman Bethune.

In 1973, Pierre Trudeau became the first Canadian Prime Minister to pay an official visit to the PRC, and in 1984 Chinese Premier Zhao Ziyang visited Canada, becoming the first Chinese Communist Party senior leader to address Parliament. Governor General of Canada Jeanne Sauvé also conducted a state visit to China during her tenure. In 1985 as part of a growing concern for relations with China and Japan the Canadian Parliament passed an Act to create the Asia Pacific Foundation of Canada, a think-tank focusing on Canada–Asia relations.

In 1976, Trudeau refused to permit Taiwan to participate in the Olympic games held that year in Montreal unless they were willing to give up the name "Republic of China," which they refused to do. Canada thereby became the first host country to breach its obligation to admit all teams recognized by the International Olympic Committee.

By 1990, two-way trade exceeded CA$3 billion, and in 1992, CA$4.6 billion. In 1994 Canada established its four-pillar policy on China: economic partnership; sustainable development; human rights, good governance and the rule of law; and peace and security. That same year Prime Minister Jean Chrétien visited Beijing and Shanghai with Team Canada: two ministers, nine provincial premiers, the territorial leaders and the head of the Federation of Canadian Municipalities. Chrétien and Chinese Premier Li Peng signed a nuclear co-operation agreement and a letter of intent on six development projects in China. The following year Premier Li Peng visited Canada to commemorate the 25th anniversary of bilateral relations and attended Canada-China Business Council annual general meeting in Montreal.

Prime Minister Jean Chrétien, Minister of International Trade Art Eggleton and Secretary of State (Asia Pacific) Raymond Chan visited Shanghai again in 1996 to attend the annual general meeting of the Canada-China Business Council, and Chrétien, Minister of International Trade Sergio Marchi, and Secretary of State (Asia Pacific) Raymond Chan visited Beijing and Lanzhou returned once more in 1998. In 1999, Chinese Premier Zhu Rongji visited Canada.

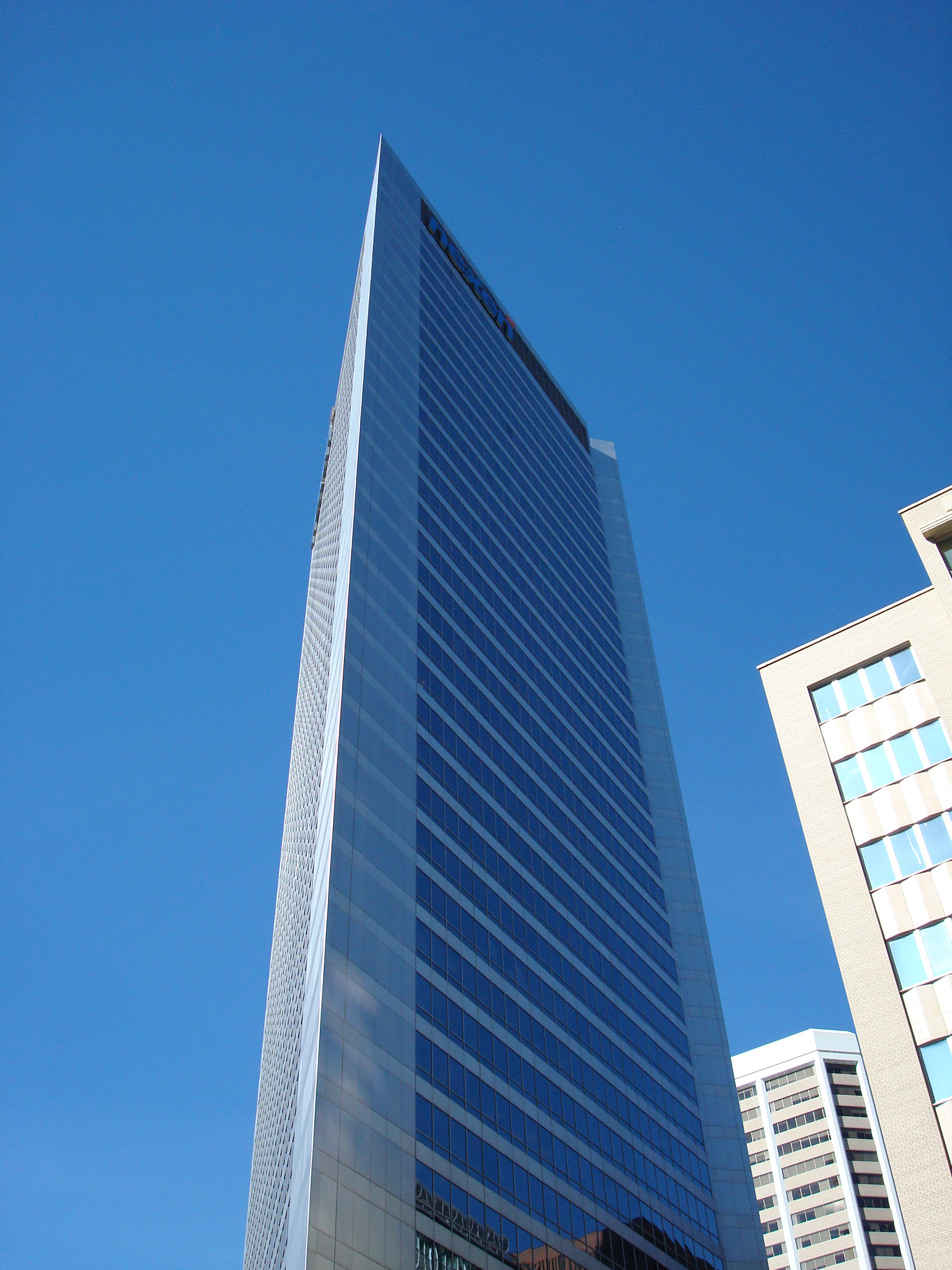
The Nexen Building in Calgary. Canadian oil and gas company Nexen was acquired in 2013 by China's state-controlled China National Offshore Oil Corporation (CNOOC).

In 2001 Team Canada visited Beijing, Shanghai and Hong Kong. It was the largest trade mission in Canadian history to that point. Chrétien was accompanied by close to 600 business participants, eight provincial premiers, three territorial leaders, Minister for International Trade Pierre Pettigrew and Secretary of State (Asia-Pacific) Rey Pagtakhan. In 2003, Premier Wen Jiabao visited Canada. CCP General Secretary Hu Jintao visited Canada in 2005 and met with Prime Minister Paul Martin. The two leaders announced a "strategic partnership" and said they would double trade within five years. Martin said he had discussions about human rights with Hu.

Since 2003, China has been Canada's second largest trading partner, passing Britain and Japan. China now accounts for about 6% of Canada's total world trade (imports and exports combined). Between 1998 and 2007, imports from China grew by almost 400%.

According to a study by the Fraser Institute think tank, China replaced Japan as Canada's third-largest export market in 2007, with CA$9.3 billion flowing into China. Between 1998 and 2007, exports to China grew by 272 per cent, but only represented about 1.1 per cent of China's total imports. In 2007, Canadian imports of Chinese products totalled CA$38.3 billion.

Leading commodities in the trade between Canada and China include chemicals, metals, industrial and agricultural machinery and equipment, wood products, and fish products.

According to the China Goes Global survey conducted by the Asia Pacific Foundation of Canada in 2013, Canada was poised to accept more trade and investment from China as it is viewed by Chinese companies as being one of the most open countries to their investment.

In 2013, Canadian oil and gas company Nexen became a wholly owned subsidiary of Hong Kong-based CNOOC Limited. The Reuters reported that the "deal gave CNOOC access to acreage in the Gulf of Mexico, the UK North Sea and off the coast of Western Africa". According to the Maclean's, "The CNOOC-Nexen deal touched off a great deal of controversy about what degree foreign state-owned control of Canadian resources is acceptable. That the deal came from a Chinese company, in particular, raised concerns in some quarters about doing business with a non-democratic state."

Canada had a major trade imbalance with China (nearly CA$36 billion in 2017), leading Trudeau to strive to increase exports, primarily agricultural products. On 15 October 2018, he stated: "Obviously, China is the world's second-largest economy and growing, and will remain an important place to do business and to look for opportunity ... We will continue to look (at increasing trade), but we will continue to do it in the way Canada always has, mindful of the challenges, both of scale and of different approaches to business, in a way that is thoughtful about drawing benefit and protections for Canada." About a month later, Chinese premier Li Keqiang called for more trade with Canada and hinted that China was open to discussing the free-trade agreement that Canada had suggested.

The negotiations were continuing, although the relationship between Canada and China was somewhat strained because of concerns about the latter's record on human rights and various trade issues. This was exacerbated in December 2018 by Canada's arrest of Huawei Technologies' Chief Financial Officer, Meng Wanzhou, based on a warrant issued by a court in New York state and the subsequent detention of two Canadians living in China. The effect on trade between China and Canada was not yet apparent as of mid December, but some effect was likely, based on China's warning of "grave consequences" if Meng was not released. By 18 December, the free-trade discussions between the countries had been halted, however.

The political tensions were unlikely to lead to a major, long-term disruption of trade between the two countries, according to Fraser Johnson, a professor at the Western University's Ivey School of Business. He stated, "I really can't imagine it happening. There's just too much at stake. I don't think either country wants to damage (the relationship)."

China's Foreign Minister Wang Yi urged Canada to normalize relations and build a strategic partnership during talks with Canadian Foreign Minister Mélanie Joly. Relations have been strained since 2018 due to the arrest of Huawei CFO Meng Wanzhou and China's subsequent detention of two Canadians. Joly expressed Canada's commitment to the one-China policy and willingness to enhance cooperation in various sectors.

China's importation of Canadian oil increased following the completion of the TMX Trans-Mountain Pipeline expansion in May 2024, and increased further after China decreased oil imports from the United States following the 2025 tariffs imposed by Donald Trump.

== Cultural relations ==
=== Sports ===
China has sought to learn from Canada's experience in ice hockey to become better in the Olympics, and has recruited Canadian players for its own teams.

== Public opinion ==
A major BBC World Service poll from 2017 found that only 37% of Canadians viewed China's world influence positively, with 51% expressing a negative view. A survey conducted in May 2020 by Angus Reid found that 76% of Canadians say human rights and rule of law should be more important than trade opportunities with China, only 24% of respondents said that Canada should develop closer trade ties with China, down from 40% in 2015. The survey also corroborated the Pew poll, saying that 81% of Canadians held a negative view of China. An October 2017 survey by UBC indicated that close to 70% of Canadians supported a free trade agreement with China, in spite of concerns about the latter's growing world power and China's record on human rights. Some negative effect on trade between was likely however, subsequent to increased tension between the two countries in December 2018 after arrests in both Canada and China.

Only 14% of Canadians view the country favourably, according to polling conducted in early 2021. Moreover, according to a 2021 poll by Maru Public Opinion, 52% of Canadians view China as the nation's "biggest foreign threat" and believe a Second Cold War between the United States and China has already begun. Canadian opinions of China improved in 2025 with the election of Donald Trump; a survey carried out in September 2025 by the Angus Reid Institute found that 27% of Canadians viewed China favorably, up from 16% earlier this year. A survey published in 2026 by the Pew Research Center found that 51% of Canadian people had an unfavorable view of China, while 44% had a favorable view. It also found that 61% of Canadian people in the 18-35 age group had positive opinions of China.

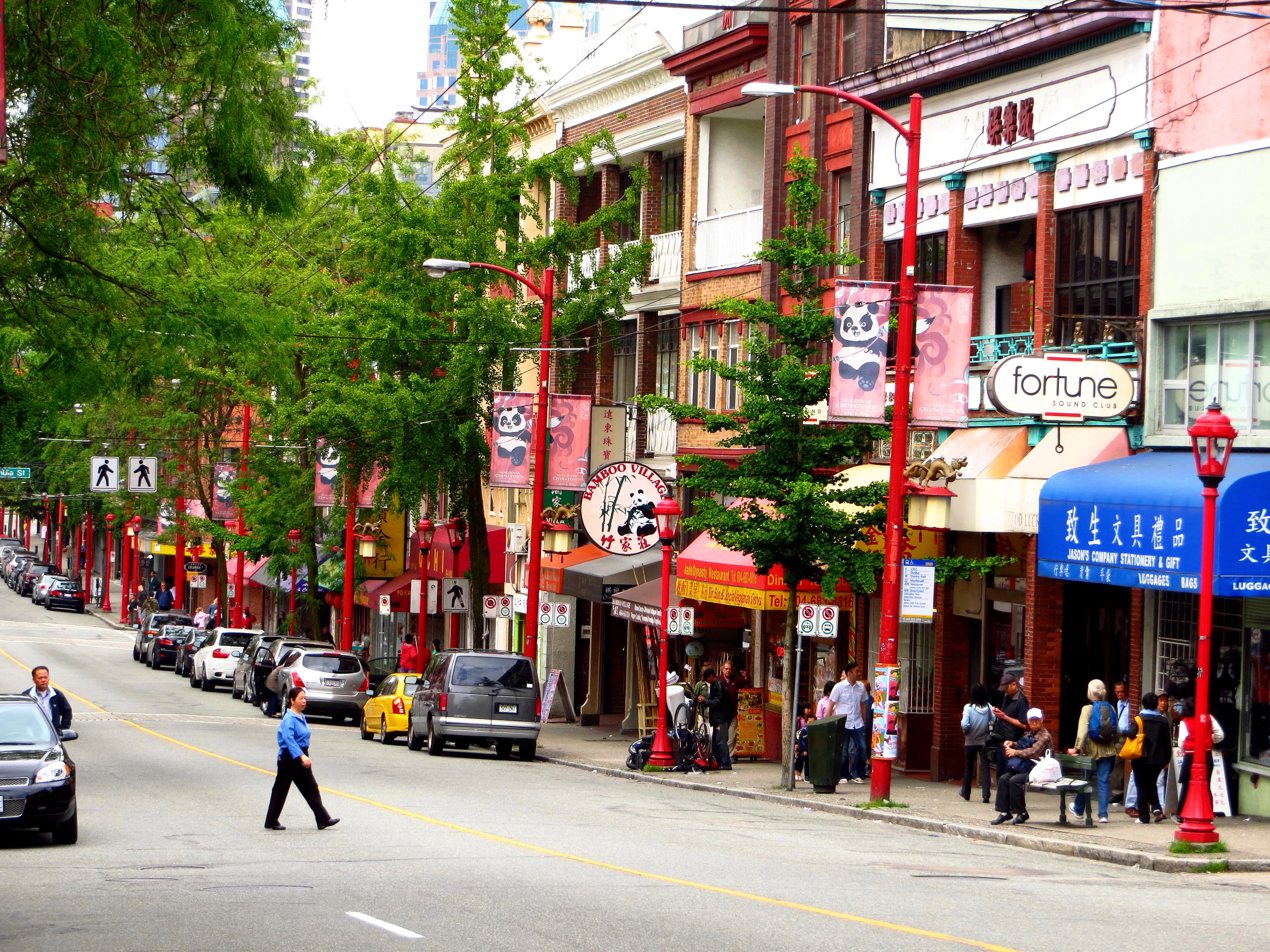
Vancouver's Chinatown. In 2016, people of Chinese origin made up 27% of all Vancouver residents.

== Migration ==
Canada is home to a large Chinese diaspora. Chinese Canadians are one of Canada's largest ethnic groups, after Europeans and First Nations population.

According to Jonathan Manthorpe, the Chinese government has engaged in actions of monitoring and intimidation against Chinese Canadians.

== Education ==
Canada and PRC have at least one pair of schools twinned with each other:

- (Ontario) Dr Norman Bethune Collegiate Institute, Scarborough – twinned with (China) Beijing No. 15 Middle School, Beijing

== Resident diplomatic missions ==
of Canada in China

- Beijing (Embassy)
- Chongqing (Consulate-General)
- Guangzhou (Consulate-General)
- Hong Kong (Consulate-General)
- Shanghai (Consulate-General)

of China in Canada

- Ottawa (Embassy)
- Calgary (Consulate-General)
- Montreal (Consulate-General)
- Toronto (Consulate-General)
- Vancouver (Consulate-General)

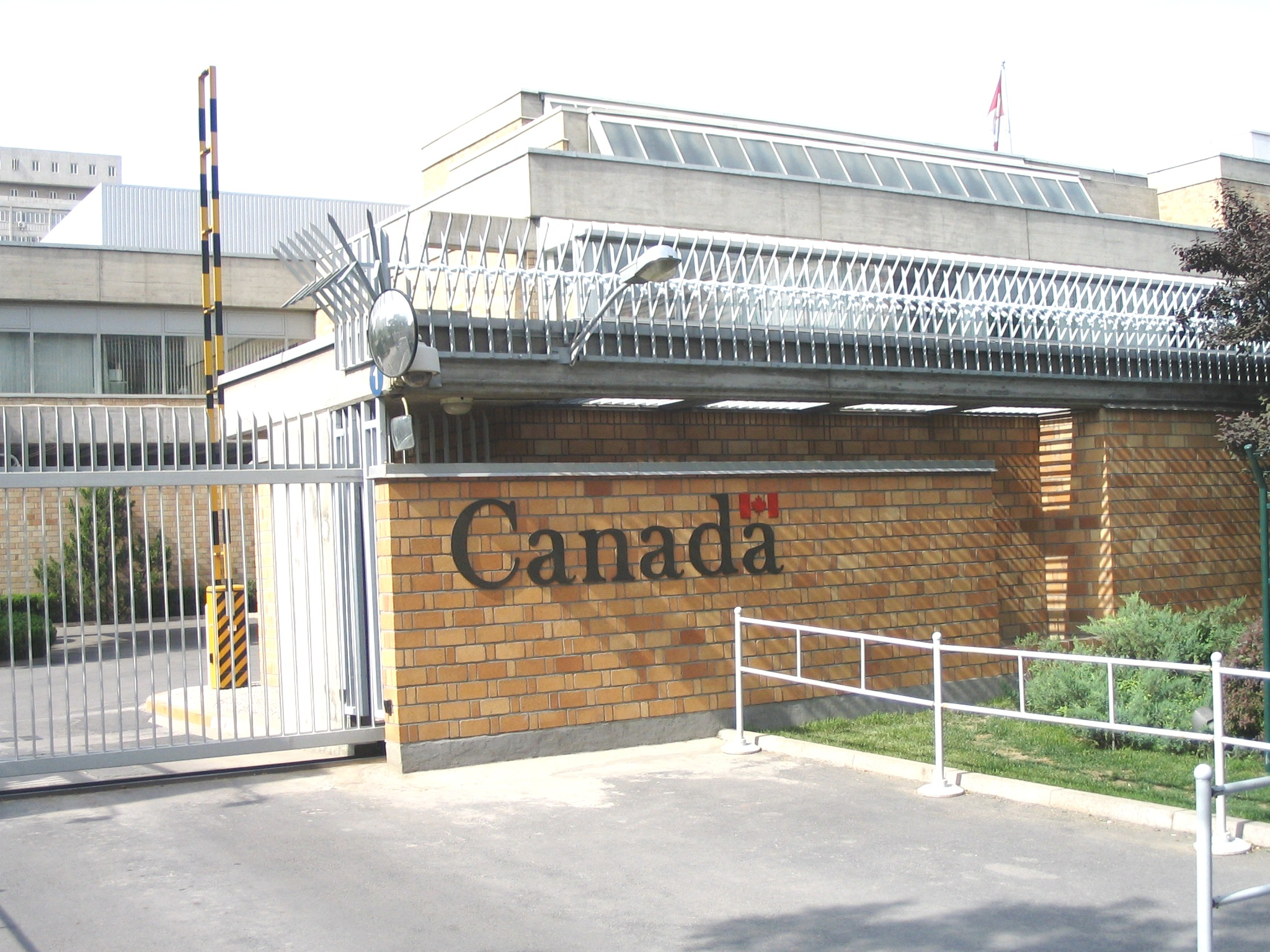
Embassy of Canada in Beijing

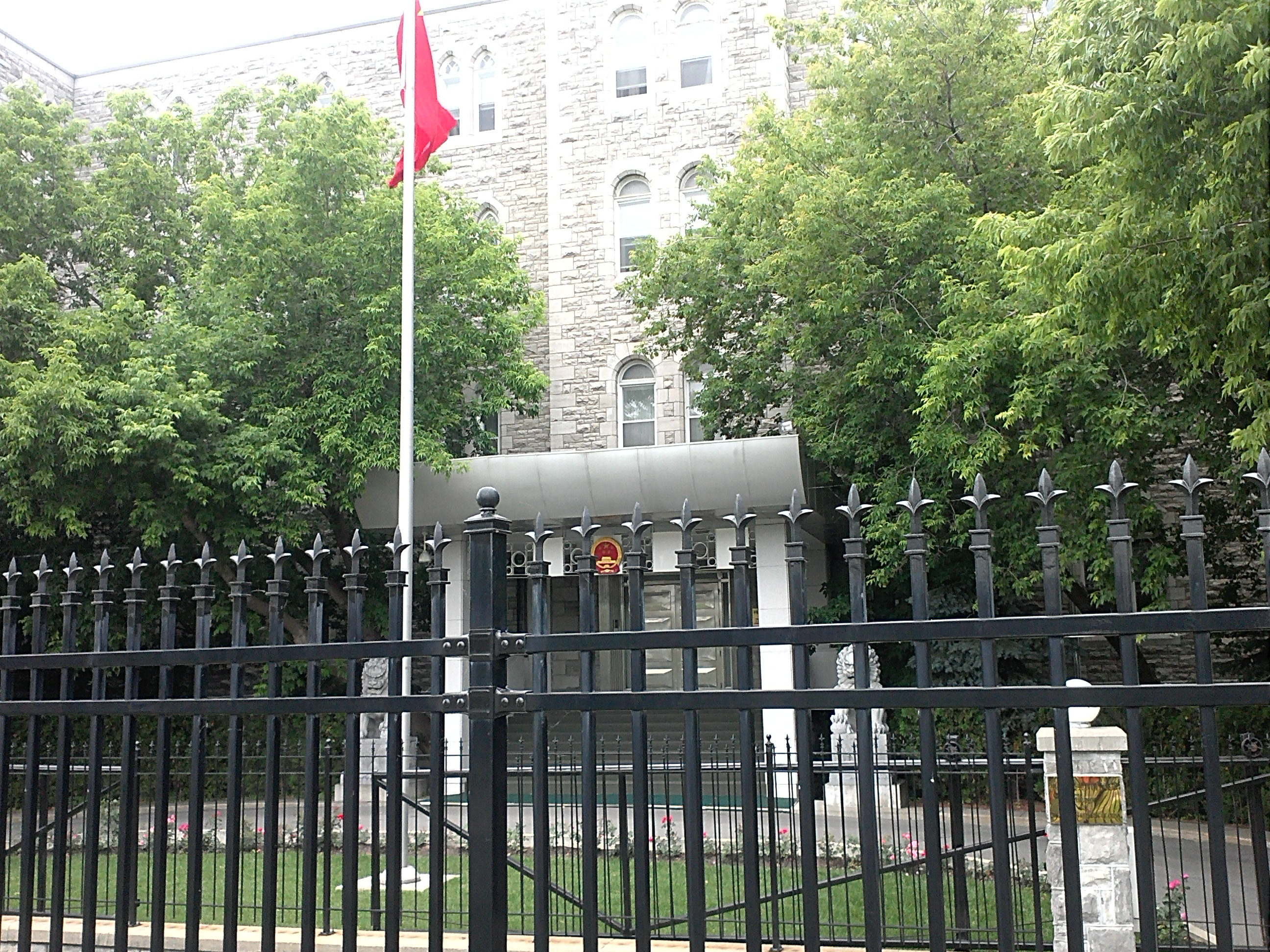
Embassy of China in Ottawa

== See also ==
- Canadians in China
- Chinese Canadian
- Embassy of China, Ottawa
- List of Canadian ambassadors to the People's Republic of China
- Canada–Taiwan relations
- Canada–Hong Kong relations
- Foreign relations of Canada
- Foreign relations of China
