= Invest in Canada =

Canadian governmental organisation

- Invest in Canada's logo since 2018

Agency overview
- Formed: 12 March 2018
- Headquarters: Ottawa, Ontario
- Minister responsible: Maninder Sidhu, Minister of International Trade
- Agency executives: Karl Tabbakh, Board Chair; Laurel Broten, CEO
- Parent department: Global Affairs Canada
- Key document: Investment Canada Act
- Website: investcanada.ca

Invest in Canada is an arms-length Government of Canada organization that promotes and attracts foreign direct investment into Canada. It was created through the Investment Canada Act and launched on March 12, 2018 as a departmental corporation.

== History ==
Before the Invest in Canada agency was created, a division within the federal department Global Affairs Canada led the promotion of investment into Canada. In 1985, the Government implemented the Investment Canada Act to govern foreign direct investment. The Harper government used to limit foreign investment to no more than 50% share, through a policy designed by Nigel S. Wright during his time at the PMO.

Foreign direct investment (FDI) by country and by industry are tracked by Statistics Canada; the total in 2012 of FDI was CA$634 bn. New FDI inflow to Canada in 2011 was CA$40.8 bn. Canada was host to CA$33 bn in state-owned enterprise investment over the period between 2005 and 2012. Over the same period, the net FDI increased by CA$236.1 bn, so that SOE FDI was almost 14% of the total. Conversely, Canadian SOEs limit themselves to domestic affairs. The SOE of Canada are not aggressive in this manner: Canadian SOEs have no foreign investments.

The Canadian government is planning to raise to CA$1 bn the amount of foreign money that can go into a Canadian company before the investment is reviewed. As of 2012, an investment or takeover of a Canadian business by a WTO investor worth CA$330 mn or more triggers a federal review under the Investment Canada Act. The WTO was implemented in Canada by the World Trade Organization Agreement Implementation Act in 1994. Innovation, Science and Economic Development Canada provides a helpful webpage with this information and explains that WTO members are eligible for CA$344 mn review-free investment as of 12 January 2013. The WTO maintains a membership list. The information on the WTO "amount" permitted by the discretion of the Minister of Industry under subsection 14.1(2) of the Investment Canada Act is published annually in January in the Canada Gazette. The government investigates whether the investment is of "net benefit" to Canada, which brings into play a nebulous political definition. Amounts inferior to this limit do not incur political oversight under the Investment Canada Act, so that the foreign investor is treated like any other Canadian investor. This means effectively, that Canada is open to reverse takeover by stealth. Prime Minister Harper clarified this FDI policy area in Toronto on 7 November 2013 when he said that a little wiggle room was needed on foreign takeover rules.

== Bonds ==
On 5 November 2013, British Columbia finance minister Mike de Jong reported a successful placement of Chinese RMB$2.5bn in dim sum bonds. The issue was five times oversubscribed.

== Investments ==
=== 2004–05 ===
- On 8 March 2004, The J.M. Smucker Company bought International Multifoods Corporation for cash US$500M and considerations of $340M. This included Robin Hood Flour, Red River Cereal, Bick's Pickles and Monarch Flour, among a dozen other brands.
- On 21 August 2005,TUI AG unit Hapag-Lloyd agreed to acquire CP Ships Limited, including its Port of Montreal transshipment wharf, for €1.7bn (US$2bn) in cash. It has now made the combined fleet the fifth largest by capacity in the worldwide container shipping market. In 2006 the CP Ships name disappeared for good. TUI AG plans to divest of Hapag-Lloyd, which is a 37% German SOE.

=== 2006 ===
- In January, ArcelorMittal took over Dofasco, for CA$5.5 bn.
- In August, Xstrata (subsequently delisted) CA$16 bn purchased for US$22.5bn Falconbridge Ltd. (subsequently delisted)
- In October, Vale purchased 86% of INCO (subsequently delisted) for CA$15 bn
- In 2006 and 2007, Sinopec Shanghai Engineering Co. Ltd.'s Canadian subsidiary named SSEC Canada Ltd was hired by Canadian Natural Resources to build a structure on their Horizon Oil Sands project. On 24 April 2007, two Chinese temporary foreign workers were killed and five other Chinese temporary foreign workers were injured. SSEC was fined in October 2012 CA$1.5 mn for the incident. Investigations later determined that 132 SSEC workers had been unpaid since the start of their employment with SSEC. SSEC fled the country and the government was unable for a number of years to serve it legal documents.

=== 2007 ===
- In January, Bowater merged with Abitibi Consolidated to form a 52-48 joint venture called AbitibiBowater.
- In April, Algoma Steel was purchased by India's Essar Group for US$1.63 billion, continuing operations as a subsidiary known as Essar Steel Algoma Inc.
- In May, a deal to acquire IPSCO steel (of Saskatchewan) for $7.7 billion was announced by SSAB Swedish Steel AB.
- In June, the ED Smith Income Fund accepted a takeover for CA$217 mn from TreeHouse Foods of Chicago.
- In July, Rio Tinto acquired Alcan, in a US$38 billion deal. Rio Tinto Alcan subsequently divested itself of Alcan Engineered Products (to a consortium) and Alcan Packaging (to Amcor, announced in August 2009). In January 2013 the CEO in charge of the Alcan deal, Tom Albanese, stepped down in favour of Sam Walsh because he had overpaid.
- In 2007, the UK Tate & Lyle conglomerate announced the sale of its Redpath Sugar refining business to American Sugar Refining
- In 2007, US Steel's CA$1.9 bn took over the bankrupt Stelco works (largely in Hamilton), subsequently idled in 2010 and finally shutdown in October 2013.

=== 2008–12 ===
- In spring 2009, China Investment Corporation purchased a CA$1.7 bn 17% share ownership of Teck Resources.
- IPIC, which is wholly owned by the government of the Emirate of Abu Dhabi, 100% purchase of Nova Chemicals (subsequently delisted)
- On 12 April 2010, ConocoPhillips agreed to sell its 9% share in Syncrude to Sinopec, a Chinese SOE oil company. The sale, for $4.65 billion, was completed on June 25, 2010.
- Also in April 2010, Merit Mining Corp. was taken over by Tianjin Huakan Group Co. Ltd. in a CA$15.5 mn deal, and in December 2010 subsequently renamed to Huakan International Mining Inc. The transaction was funded by Hong Kong Huakan Investment Corp., an opaque Chinese investor located at Unit 1105, 11/F, Tower 1, Lippo Centre No. 89 Queensway, Admiralty, Hong Kong.
- The Norwegian SOE, Statoil, formed a 65-35 joint venture with Husky Energy, which is controlled in Hong Kong by Li Ka Shing.
- In 2011, Pohang Iron and Steel Company joint venture with Fortune Minerals, a $768mn project
- Also in 2011, HD Mining International was taken over by Huiyong Holdings (BC) (55%) and Canadian Dehua Lvliang Ltd. (40%) to operate the Murray River project. Huiyong Holdings (BC) is 100% owned by Huiyong Holdings China, an opaque Chinese investor.
- In October 2012, TransCanada Corporation and Phoenix Energy Holdings (aka PetroChina SOE) formed a 50-50 joint-venture CA$3 bn Grand Rapids Pipeline project in Northern Alberta (operated by Brion Energy Corp.).
- Athabasca Oil Corp. and Phoenix Energy Holdings (aka PetroChina SOE) 40-60 joint-venture in Dover oil sands project.
- In December 2012, Malay SOE, Petroliam Nasional, purchased for CA$6 bn Progress Energy (since delisted).
- Also in December 2012, Baffinland was formed, now a Nunavut Iron/ArcelorMittal 50-50 joint venture, with the latter as Project Operator

=== 2013 ===
- On 14 January, JSC «Atomredmetzoloto», a unit of ARMZ Uranium Holding, which in turn is controlled by Russian SOE, Rosatom, bid US$1.3bn for the 49% stake it didn't already own in Uranium One, a Canadian miner with holdings in Kazakhstan.
- On 29 January, AltaGas and Idemitsu Kosan formed a 50-50 joint venture named Triton LNG Limited Partnership, to export Alberta LNG to Japan.
- In February, ExxonMobil took over Celtic Exploration Ltd. in a deal valued at CA$3.1 bn because of holdings in the Duvernay Formation.
- Also in February, CNOOC (a Chinese SOE) purchased for CA$15.1 bn Nexen Canada
- In June, the H. J. Heinz Company was sold to Berkshire Hathaway and 3G Capital of Brazil for CA$28 bn. The deal had been agreed in February of that year. Included in this deal was the Heinz tomato ketchup plant in Leamington, which later was closed in November 2013, after the October announcement by McDonald's that they would stop serving Heinz products in their restaurants, because the CEO hired by Heinz, Bernardo Hees, was then vice-chairman of Burger King, which was at the time owned by 3G Capital.
- In November, Talisman Energy sold 75% of its Montney Formation gas holdings to Petronas SOE for CA$1.5 bn. The transaction involves 127,000 acres.
- Also in November, Petronas SOE 90% subsidiary Pacific Northwest LNG announced its plans to build a CA$11 bn LNG terminal on Lelu Island. The plant is still in its early design phases; only 25 employees have been hired.
- On December 16, it was announced that Reynolds Consumer Products Inc., subsidiary of Rank Group Ltd. of New Zealand, planned to purchase aluminum products manufacturer Novelis, subsidiary of Hindalco of India for CA$35 mn.
- On December 24, Sherritt International divested itself of Alberta and Saskatchewan coal properties valued at CA$465 mn to the benefit of Colorado-based Westmoreland Coal
- Also in December, EnCana (now Ovintiv) and PetroChina SOE formed a 50.1-49.9 joint venture (total CA$4.4 bn) to develop the Duvernay Formation in Alberta.

=== 2014 ===
- On January 31, Norwegian SOE Statoil and Thailand SOE PTTEP announced their plan to split their 60-40 joint-venture in the Kai Kos Dehseh oilsands project, so that they would each control 100% of their own leasehold properties. PTTEP spent $2.3bn on the joint venture in 2011. PTTEP got the "Thornbury", "Hangingstone" and "South Leismer" leases, while Statoil obtained the "Leismer" and "Corner" properties and was to pay $200mn to PTTEP. However, in September, Statoil postponed its investment in the "Corner" project.
- On February 12, Mexican baker Grupo Bimbo announced a $1.83bn takeover of Canada Bread, a publicly traded corporation which had been controlled by Maple Leaf Foods. Canada Bread sales in 2013 were estimated at $1.6bn, and its employees numbered 5,400. By contrast, Bimbo employs 126,000 people at 144 plants in 19 countries, including Mexico, Latin and South America, the United States, Europe and Asia.
- Canada's fifth-largest independent oil producer, Talisman Energy, was purchased by Repsol, the Spanish oil major, for $8.3 billion plus the assumption of $4.7 billion of Talisman's debt.

The oil sands in Alberta cover a vast area, and the pipelines needed to ferry their output to the BC coastline, where it will be transported by ship to Asian markets, span a wide range of investments. Many joint venture projects with foreign firms exist because Canadian capital is insufficient. Examples of news articles that have yet to be harvested for this wiki are a CBC article, and the BC regulator, as well as p. 13 of a report from Ernst and Young.

=== 2015 ===
- On 16 April, the Saudi Agricultural and Livestock Investment Co. (SALIC) partnered with U.S. agribusiness giant Bunge Limited to form Global Grain Group (G3), which will be the majority owner of Winnipeg-based Canadian Wheat Board with an investment valued at $250-million. As the principal was less than the government-regulated threshold, the investment incurred no review.

=== 2016 ===
- Thalmic Labs, a wearable computing start-up, invested US$158 Million
- Real Matters, a property valuation services, received US$100 Million
- Buildscale, a video marketing platform, received US$49 Million
- BlueRock Therapeutics, operating in regenerative medicine, received US$295 Million by Versant Ventures
- Dal Cor Pharmaceuticals received US$126 Million by Sanderling Ventures
- Zymeworks, operating in antibody and Protein Therapeutics, received US$87.8 from BDC Capital

=== 2017 ===
- One large investment in 2017 was the purchase by Hong Kong's Li Ka-Shing, who purchased Reliance Home Comfort—a water heater and air conditioning firm—for $2.82 billion.
- In March, Teutech Industries—a Guelph, Ontario, based manufacturer of precision machined and heat treated powertrain components—was acquired by Indian auto component manufacturer Hi-Tech Gears at US$44 million investment
- A Chinese consortium purchased privately held Valiant-TMS which designs and builds automated production systems.
