= Mitch Garber =

Canadian businessman (born 1964)

Mitch Garber CM
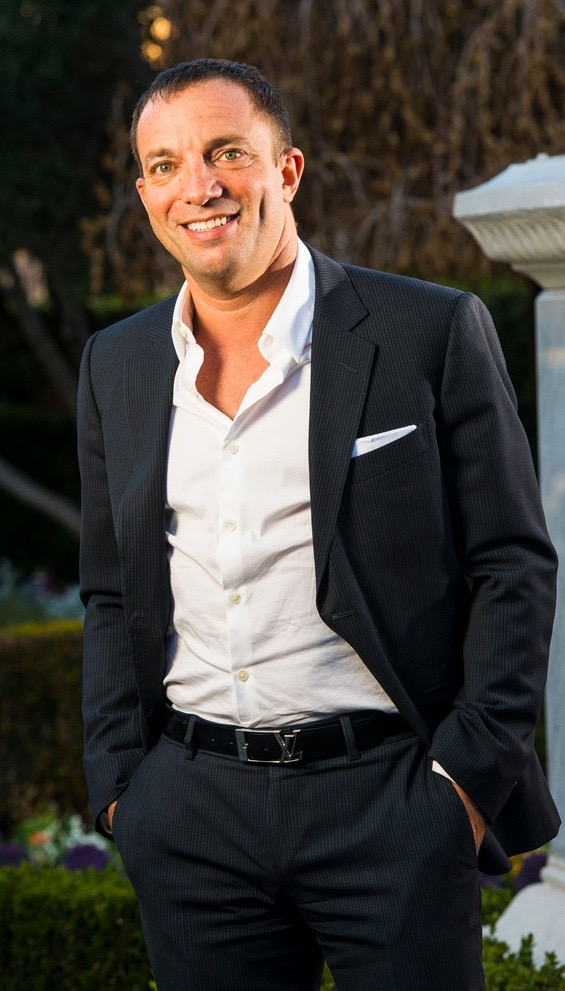
- Born: September 5, 1964 (age 62); Montreal, Quebec
- Education: McGill BA 1986, U of Ottawa Law 1989, Honorary Doctorates U of Ottawa and U of montreal
- Occupations: Investor, lawyer
- Awards: Order of Canada
- Website: www.mitchgarberinvestments.com

Mitch Garber CM (born September 5, 1964) is a Canadian lawyer, investor and business executive. He was awarded the Order of Canada in 2019, that country's highest civilian honour.

== Career ==
Mitch Garber is a member of the Executive Advisory Council of Apollo Global Management, Inc., Executive Committee member and minority owner of the NHL Seattle Kraken, and board member and co-investor at Rackspace Technology, Shutterfly, and private music royalty acquirer Xposuremusic.com .

He practiced law from 1990–1999, and was a co-founder of Paysafe (then SureFire Commerce), where he was CEO from 2003–2006. He was CEO of Bwin.Party Digital Entertainment (then PartyGaming Plc) from 2006–2008, and left to create Caesars Interactive Entertainment with TPG Inc. and Apollo Global Management.

He left Caesars Acquisition Co. (CACQ) on October 6, 2017 after overseeing the sale of Playtika and the merger of CACQ and Caesars Entertainment.

He was the inaugural Chairman of Invest In Canada (Investment Canada), the Canadian government agency responsible for attracting and facilitating foreign direct investment (FDI) into Canada from 2018–2022.

He was the chairman of Cirque Du Soleil from 2015–2020.

== Philanthropy ==
He has led the annual campaign for Montreal's United Way (Centraide), Montreal's Combined Jewish Appeal, and has presided over and chaired events and campaigns raising in excess of 200 million dollars. He currently sits on the Foundation Board of the Montreal Children's Hospital.
