= Trade mission =

Trade mission is a tool for governments to promote and market exports. It is smaller in scale compared to trade fairs and can be useful when firms are trying to enter a foreign market.

== Considerations ==
Several factors are needed to be considered whenever a business executive is trying to join a trade mission. Clearly stating the goal of trade mission before the departure is important. Choosing the target industry and the participants is a crucial aspect. Executives have to analyze the costs and possible future benefits of trade mission. Careful evaluation of the agenda is required. Target audience should be decided upon actual trade mission.

== Controversy regarding Trade Mission ==
Trade missions are supposed to be about developing trade opportunities. However, when government agency is involved, there is controversy regarding international politics being involved. Trade mission might not be conducted targeting particular industry or actual companies which won't be about developing international trade but international politics.

== Canada ==
In Canada, trade missions which include both the federal and provincial governments working together (perhaps also with cities and private businesses) are called "Team Canada Missions"

Canada has conducted regular trade missions since 1994, often led by the Prime Minister. The Canadian government claims these missions generate tens of billions of dollars in business deals. While Canadian exports and imports are higher than average to countries with which it has trade missions, the missions do not seem to have caused the increase and have negative or mainly insignificant effects.

== UK ==
UK sends British High commissions to India for trade missions. UK's continuous efforts with India in having trade missions in both countries have brought huge economic benefits.

== See also ==
- Globalization
- International trade
- International business
- International politics
