= Investment Canada Act =

Canadian federal law

The Investment Canada Act (ICA; French: Loi sur Investissement Canada, LIC) is a Canadian federal law governing foreign direct investment in Canada. The ICA was one of the first acts of Brian Mulroney's newly elected Progressive Conservative government, receiving royal assent on 20 June 1985. It has been amended at various times, including recently through Bill C-34, An Act to amend the Investment Canada Act, which received Royal Assent in 2024. Pertinent regulations include the Investment Canada Regulations, SOR/85-611 and the National Security Review of Investments Regulations, SOR/2009-271.

The ICA allows the government to review foreign investments of any size for national security risks, including minority investments and greenfield investments. The ICA also allows the government to review foreign acquisitions of control above a certain dollar threshold to determine whether it is of "net benefit" to Canada. The ICA is largely administered by Innovation, Science and Economic Development Canada (ISED). The Minister of Industry, in consultation with the Minister of Public Safety, is responsible for conducting national security reviews and coordinating with investigative bodies. For investments related to cultural industries, the Department of Canadian Heritage is responsible for the act's administration.

The dollar threshold for net benefit review is updated yearly based on Canada's Gross Domestic Product, and varies depending on whether the investment is a private sector Trade Agreement investment, private sector World Trade Organization (WTO) investment, state-owned-enterprise WTO investment, and non-WTO investment or investment in the cultural sector. As of 2026, the thresholds are as follow:

- Private sector Trade Agreement investments is $2.179 billion in enterprise for direct acquisitions of control;
- Private sector WTO investments is $1.452 billion in enterprise value for direct acquisitions of control;
- State-owned enterprise WTO investments is $578 million in asset value for direct acquisitions of control; and
- Non-WTO investments and investments in cultural business is $5 million in asset value for direct investments, and $50 million in asset value for indirect transactions.

== History ==
The Act was intended to signal Canada's openness to foreign investment and coincided with a narrowed mandate of the Foreign Investment Review Agency (FIRA), which was renamed Investment Canada. FIRA had been set up by Pierre Trudeau's Liberal government to limit increasing US ownership of Canadian business. Canadian nationalists criticized FIRA's effectiveness, noting that in practice it was rarely used to actually forbid an investment. The business community and opposition Progressive Conservative Party criticized FIRA for its activism, saying it had stifled investment from the emerging global economy.

== Effects ==
All transactions that are acquisitions of a Canadian business by non-Canadians must be "notified" (ICA ss. 11-12), but only those above a 5 million dollar threshold (or 50 million dollars for indirect investments, such as shares) are reviewable (ICA s. 14). If the investor is a WTO member, the threshold was 320 million in 2012.

World Trade Organization membership shown in dark green.

The Act empowers a Director of Investments which is also the Deputy Minister of Industry , to produce decisions, and reports of decisions. The thresholds, for valuations above which the ICA is to be invoked, are (according to the legislation) several and hinge on whether or not the investors are part of the World Trade Organization.

While the ICA gives Investment Canada the power to restrict investment, its mandate is only to "review...significant investments...in a manner that encourages investment, economic growth and employment opportunities" unless proposed investments specifically injure national security. According to labour economist Jim Stanford, the Mulroney government never invoked the Act to deter a foreign investment, nor did its successors, the Chrétien and Martin Liberal governments.

Foreign investment in Canada rose significantly in the wake of the ICA, from approximately $100 billion in 1985 to over $550 billion in 2006.

The ICA was invoked for the first time when in 2008 the Conservative government of Stephen Harper blocked the sale of the space division of MacDonald, Dettwiler & Associates, a Vancouver-area technology company, to US-based Alliant Techsystems. As of November 2010, the federal government had reviewed 1,637 takeovers since 1985 and rejected only one, that of MDA.

On 3 November 2010, then-Minister of Industry Tony Clement imposed conditions for approval of the hostile takeover for over $38bn of PotashCorp by Australia-based mining conglomerate BHP Billiton. On 15 November 2010, BHP-Billiton withdrew its bid, saying the conditions had proved too onerous.

== Criticism ==
While the Act was not used to formally block takeover bids and investments, its presence and vague mandate enables diplomats, public representatives and civil servants to informally dissuade investors, and creates a sense of government risk amongst foreign investment analysts. The scale of impact is difficult to measure and has not been widely studied.

Nationalist critics believe the Act is too narrow and, as a matter of policy, should more heavily restrict foreign investment.

Critics note that Canada's share of world direct investment fell significantly after 1985. Some of this is due to large increases in emerging economies' receipt of FDI, but Canada's share has fallen even amongst developed countries, and in the late 2000s Canada became a net investor in the world.

Some critics note that the Harper government's use of the ICA has seemed unpredictable, resulting in a "chilling" effect on foreign investment in Canadian companies. This hidden effect, if it exists, could suppress the value of Canadian shares and companies by deterring potential investors from even considering Canada as a market or destination. In response to this criticism, on 15 November 2010 the Harper government signalled its intention to provide clear guidelines for its use of the ICA.
