= Gus Van Harten =

Canadian legal scholar

Gus Van Harten is a professor of Administrative Law at York University's Osgoode Hall in Toronto, Ontario, Canada. He is co-editor of the journal Administrative Law — Cases and Materials. He has a particular focus on investor-state dispute settlement (ISDS).

== Early years ==
Van Harten clerked in the Ontario Court of Appeal and later worked on the Walkerton Inquiry over the two years from 2000, and then the Arar Inquiry for two years from 2004.

== In academia ==
Van Harten was a faculty member in the Law Department of the London School of Economics, prior to his appointment at Osgoode Hall in 2008.

Van Harten is a critic of the Canada-China Foreign Investment Promotion and Protection Agreement.

== Learned texts ==
- Investment Treaty Arbitration and Public Law. OUP. 2007.
- Sovereign Choices and Sovereign Constraints. OUP. 2013.
- Sold Down the Yangtze: Canada's Lopsided Investment Deal with China. Lorimer. 2015.
