= Proteon Therapeutics =

American pharmaceutical company

- Company type: Public
- Traded as: Nasdaq: PRTO; Russell Microcap Index component
- Industry: Pharmaceuticals
- Founded: 1 January 2001
- Headquarters: Waltham, United States
- Website: www.proteontherapeutics.com

Proteon Therapeutics, Inc. is a developer of pharmaceuticals with offices in Waltham, Massachusetts and Kansas City, Missouri.

== Company History ==
Proteon was founded by Dr. F. Nicholas Franano based on technology created at Johns Hopkins University. Major investors in the company include MPM Capital, Rockhill Partners, TVM Capital, Skyline Ventures, Prism VentureWorks, Vectis Life Sciences and Intersouth Partners. They have invested over $72 million in the company.

The company is led by Timothy Noyes, CEO; Steven Burke, CMO; George Eldridge, CFO; and Scott Toner, director of marketing.

On March 5, 2009, the company announced that it had raised $32 million from its existing investors plus MPM Capital and Vectis Life Sciences. Proteon also announced that it had entered into an option agreement to be acquired by Novartis for up to $550 million. The company went public in 2014.

In September 2019, Proteon Therapeutics merged with ArTara Therapeutics.

== PRT-201 ==
Proteon is developing PRT-201 (vonapanitase), a drug to improve blood flow following vascular surgery procedures, and, more broadly, is interested in vascular access for hemodialysis and peripheral arterial disease (PAD). PRT-201 is a recombinant human elastase manufactured for Proteon by Lonza.

In September 2008, the company announced that the Food and Drug Administration had granted fast track status to PRT-201. In December 2016, they announced that the phase III trial of PRT-201 hadn't reached its primary endpoint, causing Proteon's stock price to drop more than 75%.
