= Team Canada Mission =

Team Canada Missions (TCTMs) are Canadian government international trade missions led by the Prime Minister of Canada, the Minister of International Trade along with the leaders of the provinces and territories of Canada.

The first Team Canada Mission was made in 1994, and led by PM Jean Chrétien. The missions are cited as a significant legacy of his Prime Ministership.

As of March 2025, a Canadian government website listed the description of Team Canada Trade Missions (TCTMs) as "large-scale, minister-led trade missions to the Indo-Pacific region." The same website stated the missions "prioritize innovation sectors where Canada has a competitive advantage. Delivered by Canada's Trade Commissioner Service, TCTMs are also a key initiative under the Indo-Pacific Strategy."

== History ==
Chrétien would make a total of four Team Canada trade missions to China. Writing in The Globe and Mail, April Fong noted that a group of "nearly 500 Canadian political and business representatives (...) made a splash" during the inaugural Team Canada visit to China in November 1994. The visit was "the largest delegation of any kind to China following the Tiananmen Square massacre in 1989." In the same article, then president and CEO of the Asia Pacific Foundation of Canada, Yuen Pau Woo was quoted as saying "that while the Team Canada model was creative and successful 10 to 15 years ago, that isn't the case today", citing increased global interest in the Chinese market.

In 2004, U.S. think tank The Wilson Center hosted Joel Sokolsky, Professor of Political Science at the Royal Military College of Canada, to discuss the legacy of Chrétien's foreign and defence policy. Sokolsky argued that despite Canadian peacekeeping efforts of the time, Chrétien's government made "prosperity and employment for Canadians its top foreign policy priority", primarily through the establishment of Team Canada trade missions.

In a 2014 iPolitics piece, then Liberal trade critic Chrystia Freeland remarked that she saw PM Harper’s trip to China as a ‘tacit acknowledgement’ of the worth of Team Canada missions. The article noted that Harper had previously criticized "the Chrétien-era delegations as an ineffective trade promotion tool".

A Globe and Mail article from September 2023 noted that the then federal Trade Minister, Mary Ng, had announced a postponement of a "‘Team Canada’ trade mission to India amid strained relations." In a 2025 video report, Global News reported that B.C. Premier David Eby was in Washington, D.C. as part of a Team Canada Mission to discuss Donald Trump's trade tariffs and tariff threats with U.S. lawmakers.

== Previous missions (1994–2002) ==
The Canadian Trade Commissioner Service lists the following as having been "Team Canada" mission (led by the Prime Minister):

- January 2002: Russia and Germany (Moscow, Berlin, Munich), Focus Sector(s): Multi-sector
- November 2001: Team Canada West (Dallas, Los Angeles), Focus Sector(s): Multi-sector
- May 2001: Team Canada Atlantic (Atlanta), Focus Sector(s): Multi-sector
- February 2001: China (Beijing, Shanghai, Hong Kong), Focus Sector(s): Multi-sector
- May 2000: Team Canada Atlantic (Boston), Focus Sector(s): Multi-sector
- September 1999 Japan (Tokyo, Osaka), Focus Sector(s): Multi-sector
- January 1998 Mexico, Brazil, Argentina, Chile (Mexico City, São Paulo, Buenos Aires, Santiago), Focus Sector(s): Multi-sector
- 1997: South Korea, the Philippines and Thailand
- 1996: India, Pakistan, Indonesia and Malaysia
- 1994: China
