= Government risk =

Government risk manifests when the actions of government increase uncertainty with respect to an organisation, project or activity.

Government risk is considered a general risk categorisation primarily used to describe the potential impact of changes in legislation or policies of the executive branch within existing legislation, uncertainty due to electoral factors or demonstrated behaviour of a government or jurisdiction that increases likelihood of instability and therefore uncertainty of decision making. Managing government risk exposure can be achieved through existing internal risk management processes, adherence to ISO standards via custom tools or through third party expertise.

Unlike broader and well accepted definitions for related issues such as political risk, government risk has a more micro focus on specific risk issues or indicators that may be unique to a project, reform or investment such as regulatory issues or poor reputation of actors in question due to previous compliance failures which elevate the government risk profile for that specific matter (and in the latter case, the reputational risk of the actor in question is a leading indicator of potential elevated government risk).

An example of government risk is when poor behaviour of an industry or sector leads to a government policy or regulatory response, such as the range of reforms to the Australian financial services sector arising out of the 2017-2019 Australian Royal Commission into Misconduct in the Banking, Superannuation and Financial Services Industry including a specific targeting of the financial advice sector.

This specificity of issues and indicators means government risk can be assessed at a subnational level such as a province or state government jurisdiction or even at local government level.

In an investment context, it is typically referenced as distinct from other forms of risk, such as market risk, credit risk, price risk, and natural risk when assessing the viability of an investment project.

== Distinction from Country Risk ==
It is often confused with the term "country risk" when assessing investments in foreign countries, but government risk is in fact a subset of country risk. Specifically, government risk refers only to interactions with government, but not the following elements of country risk:

- crime and property security
- currency risk
- different cultural norms around business ethics
- monopolies or business conglomerate power within in-country markets
