= Nathan VanderKlippe =

Canadian Journalist

Nathan VanderKlippe is a Canadian reporter native to West Lincoln, Ontario. He works currently as a foreign correspondent for The Globe and Mail and is based in the United States. He has previously worked as the newspaper's Asia correspondent, during which time he was based in Beijing. VanderKlippe is a recipient of numerous journalistic awards, including the Gold National Magazine Award for his work at The Walrus and a Norman Webster Award for International Reporting for his reporting on China's abuses of Uyghurs in Xinjiang.

In 2017, VanderKlippe was briefly detained by the Chinese government while attempting to conduct interviews in Xinjiang. . VanderKlippe lived in China with his family since 2013, but returned to Canada in 2020. In addition to English, he is a fluent speaker of French and Mandarin.
