= Red River Cereal =

Flax-based hot breakfast cereal

Red River Cereal is a porridge, or hot cereal, made with a blend of cracked wheat, rye, and brown flaxseeds that was first created in 1924 in Manitoba, Canada and patented in 1929. In July 2022, Arva Flour Mill announced it had acquired the brand from a subsidiary of J.M. Smucker Co.

== History ==
=== 1924-2009 ===
Created in 1924, it was initially manufactured by the Red River Grain Co. In 1928, manufacturing was taken over by Maple Leaf Milling Co. The cereal takes its name from the Red River of the North, more specifically the valley surrounding Winnipeg. The Red River brand name was acquired in 1995 by Robin Hood Multifoods, Inc. of Markham, Ontario, part of the Smucker Foods of Canada Co.

Smucker's, the new owner of the brand, then made a decision to withdraw Red River Cereal from the US retail market, making Red River available in the United States only through mail order and internet sales.

=== 2010-2019 ===
On 24 September 2011, the Canadian Food Inspection Agency issued an allergy alert that the 1.35 kg size of the product sold in Canada contained undisclosed soy, one of the nine most common food allergens.

Voluntarily, the manufacturer temporarily removed the product from the marketplace. The packaging was altered to include a warning about the presence of soy.

On 18 November 2014, following the recall of the product, the recipe was altered and the ingredients list became: "Steel-cut Wheat, steel-cut Rye, cracked and whole Flax. May contain Barley, Mustard, Oat, Sesame seed, Soybean, and Triticale ingredients".

Imported by Smucker Foods of Canada Corp., Red River cereal was re-labelled as a product of the United States.

=== 2020-present ===
Then in mid-2020, near the beginning of the CoViD-19 pandemic, Red River Cereal was no longer distributed in Canada, but was rumoured to be available by November 2020 after packaging changes were made. However, in March 2021, Smucker's announced that production of Red River Cereal had ceased entirely.

On July 19, 2022, it was announced Arva Flour Mills, North America’s oldest continuously operating commercial flour mill based in Arva, Ontario, was acquiring the Red River Cereal brand (RRC) from Smucker Foods of Canada Corp., a subsidiary of The J.M. Smucker Co. Officially acquiring the historic cereal brand on June 1, 2022, it plans to launch RRC later this month at their onsite retail store and their website. Further plans to distribute the brand into other retail locations are projected for later in 2022.
