= Canada-China Promotion and Reciprocal Protection of Investments Agreement =

2014 treaty

Canada China FIPA
Canada-China Promotion and Reciprocal Protection of Investments Agreement
- Signed: 2012
- Effective: 2014

The Canada-China Promotion and Reciprocal Protection of Investments Agreement or Canada China FIPA is a bilateral investment treaty between Canada and China which came into force on 1 October 2014. The Foreign Investment Protection Agreement (FIPA) or Foreign Investment Protection and Promotion Agreement (FIPPA) are Canadian names for BITs.

== Nomenclature ==
The short name of the Agreement Between the Government of Canada and the Government of the People's Republic of China for the Promotion and Reciprocal Protection of Investments used by Global Affairs Canada is the Canada-China Promotion and Reciprocal Protection of Investments Agreement. McCarthy Tétrault referred to the agreement as the China-Canada BIT. In Canada, the name for Bilateral Investment Treaties is Foreign Investment Protection Agreement (FIPA) or Foreign Investment Protection and Promotion Agreement (FIPA). (Note: According to McCarthy Tétrault, Canada entered into Foreign Investment Promotion and Protection agreements with Argentina on 29 April 1993, Ecuador on 6 June 1997, Venezuela on 28 January 1998, Uruguay on 2 June 1999, and Peru on 20 June 2007.) Corporations that engage in bilateral trade can use FIPAs to protect against public policies that interfere with their operation's revenue. (Note: Chapter 11 in North American Free Trade Agreement (NAFTA) represented Canada's first FIPA. according to the Council of Canadians.)

The Council of Canadians referred to the agreement as the Canada-China FIPA. Hupacasath First Nation and other First Nations organizations referred to it as the Canada China FIPPA.

== Notable obligations and clauses ==
The Canada China FIPA ties Canada "to the terms of the agreement for a minimum of 31 years."

The three core Canada China FIPA substantive obligations include "non-discriminatory treatment", "fair and equitable treatment", and "compensation for expropriation". According to a 2012 Foreign Investment Law Journal article, Canada's 2012 FIPPA model, links "fair and equitable treatment" to "The Minimum Standard of Treatment" customary in international law. This ensures "fair and equitable treatment and full protection and security in accordance with the principles of customary international law."

Concerns were raised regarding the provision for national treatment in Article 6 because the CCPRPIA did not provide for pre-establishment national treatment (a right of entry into the Canadian or Chinese markets for investors of the other country). This could disproportionately favour Chinese investors in Canada because China places more onerous requirements on foreign investors for the registration and approval of new enterprises than does Canada, and because government screening in China involves numerous levels of bureaucracy for new companies.

=== Investor-State Dispute Settlement ===
Article 15 provides that investors of one country are permitted to sue the government of the other country through an international tribunal. Corporations from either country can sue if the country in which they have their operations has public policies, even those intended on protecting the environment, health, or safety, that the corporation says "interferes with the corporation’s profitability". Canada's risk of such lawsuits is much greater than China's, since "China's foreign direct investment in Canada is much higher than Canada's in China." By 2015, Chinese foreign direct investment in Canada was roughly three times the amount of Canadian investment in China.

According to a 2014 article published by Osler, the Agreement provides safeguards to Canadian investors in the Chinese economy. The article also said that the agreement was one of China's first investment treaties with such comprehensive dispute settlement provisions. (Note: As per Article 22 of the CCPRPIA, investors may submit claims either to UNCITRAL or to ICSID.) (Note: The CCPRPIA is the first of China's investment treaties to provide for full post-establishment National Treatment (subject to any regulations and practices which were already in place, as per Article 8.2(a)(i)).) (Note: China's investment agreement with Seychelles included full post-establishment national treatment prior to the CCPRPIA, but it has not yet entered into force.)

== Background ==
The Harper government concluded negotiations on the treaty in 2012, amid concerns surrounding human rights abuses in China.

FIPA was signed by Harper in Vladivostok, Russia in 2012.

On 18 January 2013, the Hupacasath First Nation of British Columbia filed a court application to stop the Harper administration from ratifying the Canada China FIPA until consultations with First Nations on potential impacts of the FIPA took place. First Nations were concerned about the FIPA's Investor State Arbitration (ISA) clause.

While Canadian trade officials said in 2014 that FIPA was "unremarkable" and that it was a continuation of "Canada's past foreign investment promotion and protection practice, a 2014 Canadian Yearbook of International Law article described FIPPA as "novel" as it was "non-reciprocal in favour of China". The Yearbook article said that FIPPA provides a "general right of market access by Chinese investors to Canada but not by Canadian investors to China." China was given a "wider scope for investment screening" than Canada. The agreement did not include a "long-standing Canadian reservation for performance requirements that favour Aboriginal peoples". It diluted "Canada's established position on transparency in investor-state arbitration". These and other textual aspects of the China FIPPA are highlighted in comparison to other trade and investment treaties, especially those to which Canada is a party, that provide for investor state arbitration.

Elizabeth May said that the FIPA posed a threat to Canadian sovereignty. May described the negotiations as "secretive". The terms of the agreement were not released until after the Harper government fell. Critics said that some of the terms were considered unfavourable to Canadian investors and citizens.

The Canada China FIPA has been in force since 1 October 2014.

By 2017, the Canada China FIPA remained unfamiliar to most Canadians, even investors, according to the Canada China Business Council Rotman Institute for International Business. The Rotman Institute said that the agreement provided considerable certainty for those investors who are familiar with it.

The CCPRPIA was mentioned by Elizabeth May in the second French leadership debate of the 2019 Canadian federal election on 10 October.
