= Canada in the world wars and interwar period =

Canadian history

World wars and interwar era
- 1914–1947
Post-Confederation era	Cold war era
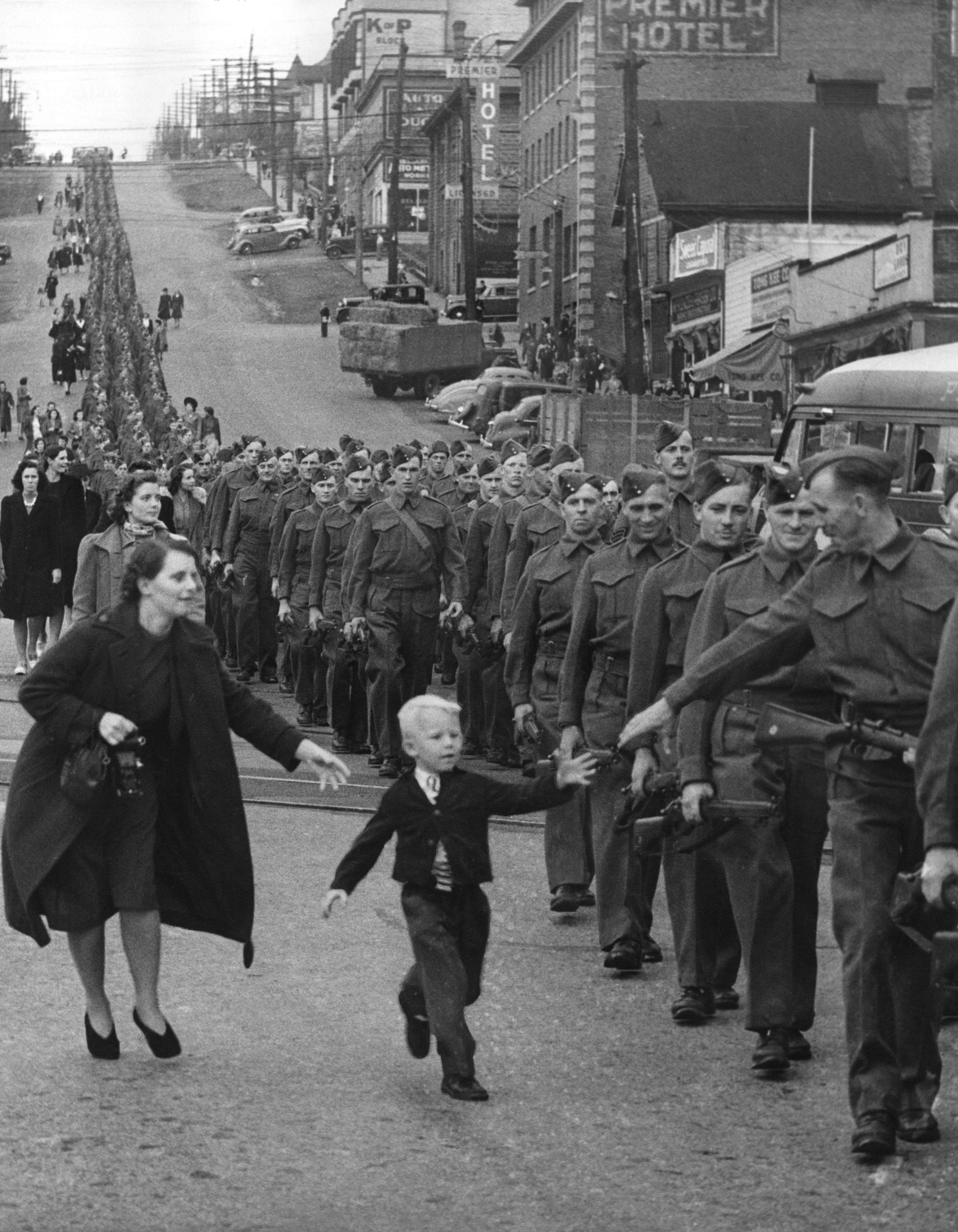
- Wait for Me, Daddy by Claude P. Dettloff, 1940
- Leader(s): Robert Borden; William Lyon Mackenzie King

During the world wars and interwar period, 1914–1947, Canada experienced economic gain, more freedom for women, and new technological advancements. There were severe political tensions over issues of war and ethnicity, and heavy military casualties. The Great Depression hit Canada hard, especially in export-oriented mining and farming communities, and in urban factory districts.

== World War I ==
The July Crisis was a series of interrelated diplomatic and military escalations among the major powers of Europe in the summer of 1914, which led to the unexpected outbreak of World War I (1914–1918). At the time, Canadians were more concerned with events within their own country than European affairs. The summer of 1914 brought a second year of drought turning wheat fields into parched deserts while the two new transcontinental railways the Grand Trunk Pacific and the Canadian Northern fell further into debt, sending the thousands of men who had helped build them into unemployment. Canada was facing its worst depression since the 1890s. Canadians hoped the Great Powers of Europe could keep the peace as they had done many times before in earlier disputes of the century. Besides, so far Britain had no reason to join in the squabble forming on the main continent, leaving no obligation for Canada to join if war did break out between Russia and France on one side and Germany and Austria-Hungary on the other. News of war did not make a stir in Canada until Germany invaded neutral Belgium, and the British delivered an ultimatum to withdraw from Belgium by August 4 or Britain would be at a state of war with Germany.

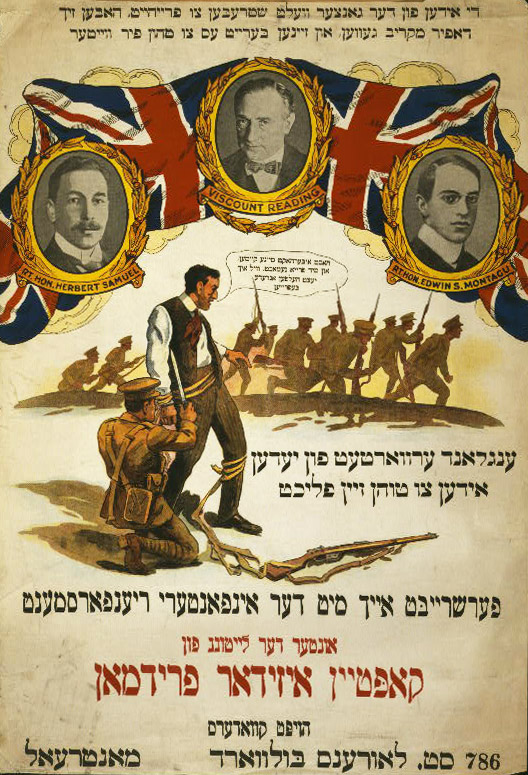
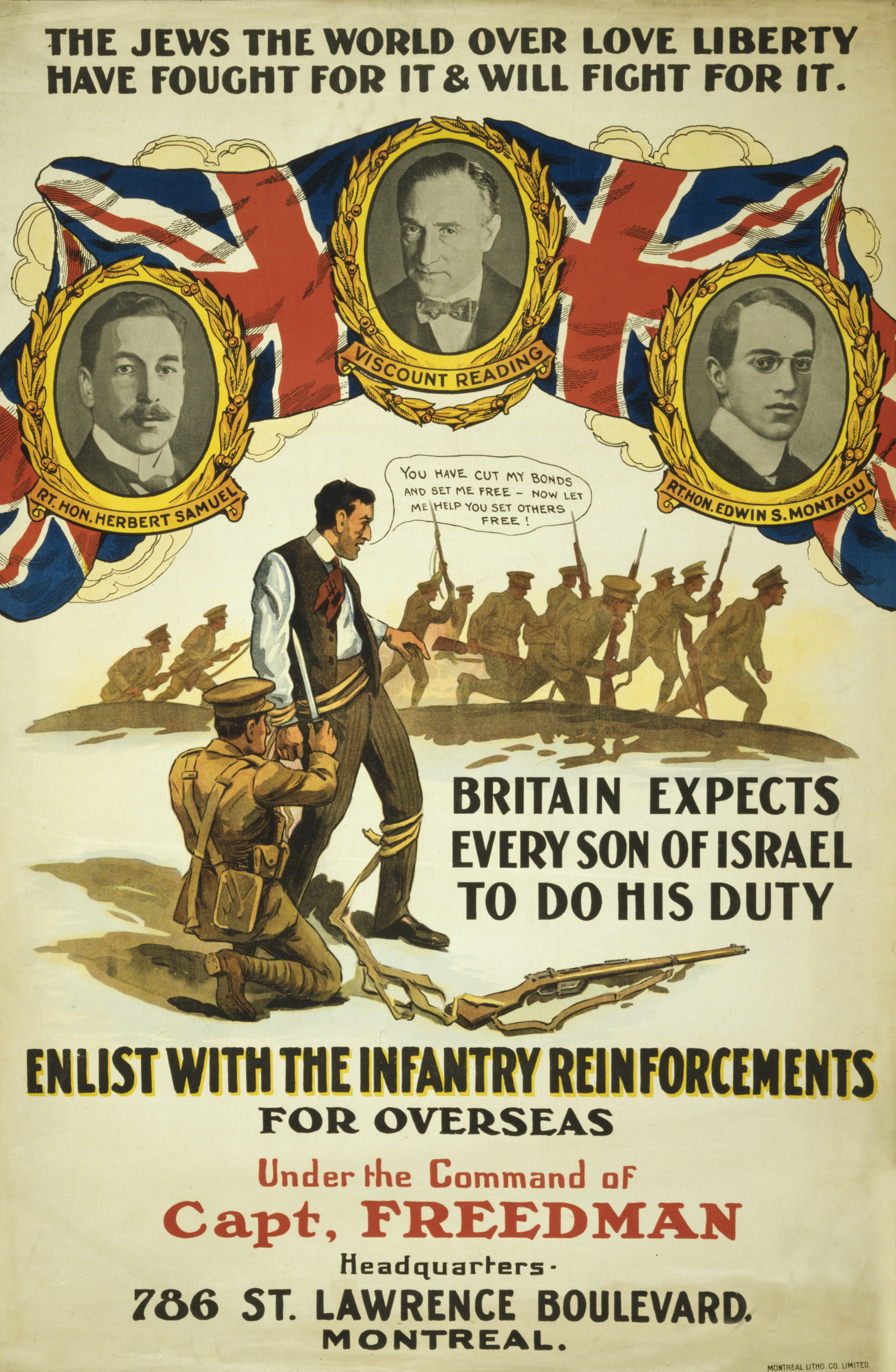
Yiddish (top) and English versions of World War I recruitment posters directed at Canadian Jews.

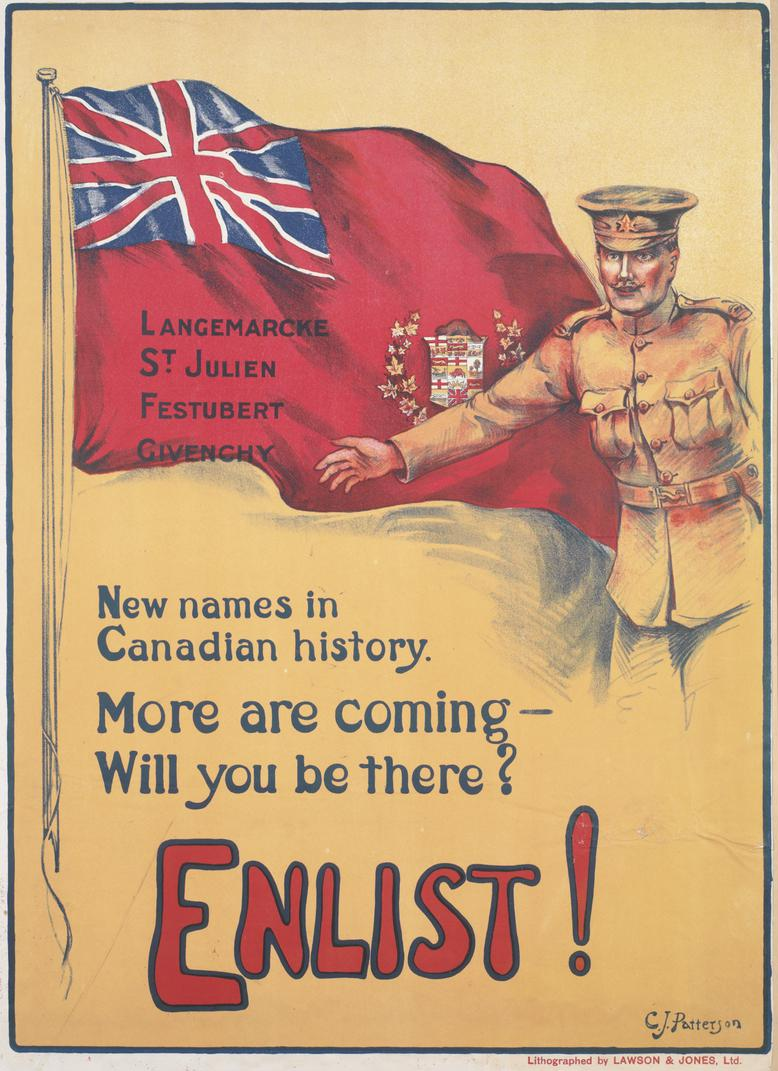
A Canadian World War I recruiting poster

On July 29, 1914, Britain warned its colonies to take precautions in case of war. Most recent wars had begun with surprise attacks such as the Russo-Japanese War. Soldiers and Canada's few sailors manned Halifax fortifications and brought guns to command the St. Lawrence river. In Victoria, British Columbia Premier Richard McBride signed a cheque for $1,150,000 and bought two submarines from a Seattle shipyard, so at least British Columbia's coast was not completely defenceless. On August 2 armed militia mounted guard on bridges, canals, tunnels and railway stations in preparation. In Ottawa, the Minister of Militia, Sam Hughes, had dreamed for years of leading Canadians to war and had for a long time preached and prepared for war with Germany and now had only to wait on London to make the first move, much to his irritation, but was persuaded by the quartermaster general Major-General Donald Alexander Macdonald to be patient. On August 4, 8:55 P.M., Canada got the news and Hughes was ecstatic: Britain was at war with Germany.

Canada was then automatically at war, as she did not yet have control over her foreign policy — not that there were many dissenters. The war was initially popular even among French Canadians, including Henri Bourassa, who historically looked afoul at the British Empire. Liberal leader Wilfrid Laurier created a 'party truce' for as long as Canada was in danger and had those dissenters in the liberal caucus hold their tongues. When asked what Canada 'must do' by the press, Laurier responded "When the call comes, our answer goes at once, and it goes in the classical language of the British answer to the call of duty, 'Ready, aye, ready!'" Prime Minister Robert Borden called a meeting of Parliament on August 18, and without division or significant debate, MPs approved an overseas contingent of 25,000 men with Canada bearing the full cost: a war appropriation of $50 million and a Canadian Patriotic Fund to support the families of men who would fight in Europe. The Cabinet spent many hours trying to devise adequate emergency legislation, resulting in the War Measures Act, decreeing the Cabinet would have the authority to do whatever it deemed necessary for the security, defence, peace, order and welfare of Canada.

In no way was Canada prepared for this scale of war. Its economy could not support it for more than a few months before being hit hard by its cost, as was with other participants. No one expected it to last longer than a few months though, many claiming it would be over by Christmas. Mass recruiting for the war effort began on August 6 with hundreds of telegrams notifying Militia colonel to begin recruiting men between the ages of 18 and 45. Hordes of British immigrants and the unemployed answered the call. Ontario, hard hit by the depression, accounted for third of the recruits, while two thirds of the recruits were British born. Few recruits came from the Maritimes and just over 1,000 were French. The cities of Toronto, Winnipeg and Montreal sent enough men each for two battalions. By September 4 there were 32,000 men and 8,000 horses in camp, far more than had been expected. There was an immediate demand for equipment, uniforms and weapons. The Ross Rifle Company worked overtime as did the textile mills and clothing factories. With a force of 32,000 equipped and ready, it soon became apparent that Embarkation from the docks would be a nightmare. Extra ships had to be chartered to carry the additional men. Battalions were marched on to ships only to be marched back off when they didn't fit. Units ignored orders and schedules and crowded the docks not wishing to wait. When it was all done, the last of 30 ships had cleared the harbour, leaving 863 horses, 4,512 tons of baggage, vehicles and ammunition behind, for which another ship had to be called in to pick up.

The first Canadian casualties of the war occurred before these troops arrived in Europe. Christopher Cradock's squadron was sunk at the Battle of Coronel off the coast of Chile, claiming four midshipmen who became Canada's first war dead. By the time that the First Contingent reached England on October 14 it became apparent the war would not be over by Christmas. Germany's initial rapid successes in Belgium and France had come to halt and both sides were starting to dig into their positions.

Canadians fought at Ypres, the Somme, Passchendaele, and other important battles, originally under British command, but eventually under a unified Canadian command. From a Canadian point of view the most important battle of the war was the Battle of Vimy Ridge in 1917, during which Canadian troops captured a fortified German hill that had eluded both the British and French. Vimy, as well as the success of the Canadian flying ace Billy Bishop, helped give Canada a new sense of identity. With mounting costs at home, Minister of Finance Thomas White introduced the first income tax in Canada as a "temporary" measure. The lowest bracket was 4% and highest was 25%.

The 620,000 men in service were most remembered for combat in the trenches of the Western Front; there were 67,000 war dead and 173,000 wounded. This total does not include the 2,000 deaths and 9,000 injuries in December 1917 when a munitions ship exploded in Halifax.

=== The conscription crisis of 1917 ===
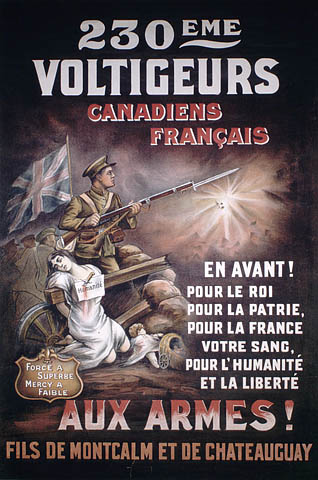
Recruitment poster for the Voltigeurs (Quebec City) invoking duty to the British Empire and to Canada, assistance to France, and French-Canadian military achievements

After three years of a war that was supposed to have been over in three months, Canada was suffering from a shortage of volunteers. Prime Minister Robert Borden had originally promised not to introduce conscription, but now believed it was necessary to win the war. The Military Service Act was passed in July, but there was fierce opposition, mostly from French Canadians (led not only by Bourassa, but also by Wilfrid Laurier), as well as Quakers, Mennonites, and other pacifists. Borden's government almost collapsed, but he was able to form a Union government with the Liberal opposition (although Laurier did not join the new government). In the 1917 election, the Union government was re-elected, but with no support from Quebec. Over the next year, the war finally ended, with very few Canadian conscripts actually participating.

=== Halifax Explosion ===
Halifax, Nova Scotia, was the main staging point for convoys making trans-Atlantic crossings. On December 6, 1917, a Belgian relief ship collided with the SS Mont-Blanc, a French munitions ship in Halifax harbour. The crash set the Mont-Blanc on fire; its holds were full of benzol, picric acid, and TNT. Twenty minutes later it exploded with a force stronger than any man-made explosion before it, destroying most of Halifax and the surrounding towns. Out of a population of 50,000, 1600 people were killed and over 9,000 injured; hundreds were blinded by flying glass. The city was evacuated and dropped out of the war effort, focusing primarily on economic survival.

== Post-war society ==
During the war, the woman's suffrage movement gained support. The provinces began extending voting rights to women in 1916, and women were finally allowed to vote in federal elections in 1918. Canada was also faced with the return of thousands of soldiers, with few jobs waiting for them at home. They also brought back with them the Spanish flu, which killed over 50,000 people by 1919, almost the same number that had been killed in the war.

=== Labour conflicts ===
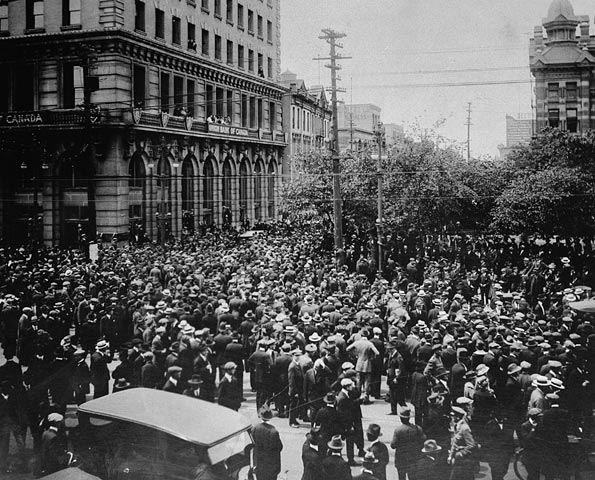
Crowd gathered outside old City Hall during the Winnipeg General Strike, June 21, 1919

The move from a wartime to a peacetime economy, combined with the unwillingness of returned soldiers to accept pre-war working conditions, led to another crisis. In 1919, the One Big Union was formed by trade union syndicalists with the intent of improving conditions for all workers, not just in a single workplace, industry, or sector. The OBU had some influence on the Winnipeg General Strike of 1919, which business and political leaders saw as an outbreak of Bolshevism, especially since the Soviet Union had recently been formed. The army was sent in to break the strike and the entire Winnipeg police force was fired and replaced with a much larger and better paid force of armed special constables. Although the Winnipeg strike is the best known, it was part of a larger strike wave that swept the country between 1919 and 1925. Special constables, vigilante "citizens" organizations, and replacement workers were mobilized in strikebreaking throughout the country in this period.

=== Politics ===
Meanwhile, in western Canada, and to some extent in the Maritimes, populist reformers were pushing for increased provincial rights and a focus on agriculture, rather than the industrial focus of Central Canada. They formed the Progressive Party of Canada, which supported Mackenzie King when the Liberals had a minority government in 1925–26. King eventually lost support, however, because of the trade tariffs issue, as well as a liquor smuggling scandal. When his request that parliament be dissolved was rejected by the Governor General of Canada (see King-Byng Affair), he was forced to resign in 1926, but was re-appointed after his party won the election later that year, after which, at an Imperial Conference, King advocated the redefining of the role of the Governor General and the gain of increased independence for Canada in the Balfour Declaration of 1926.

=== Radio ===
The history of broadcasting in Canada begins in the early 1920s, as Canadians were swept up in the radio craze and built crystal sets to listen to American stations. Main themes in the history include the development of the engineering technology; the construction of stations across the country and the building of networks; the widespread purchase and use of radio and television sets by the general public; debates regarding state versus private ownership of stations; financing of the broadcasts media through the government, licence fees, and advertising; the changing content of the programming; the impact of the programming on Canadian identity; the media's influence on shaping audience responses to music, sports and politics; the role of the Québec government; Francophone versus Anglophone cultural tastes; the role of other ethnic groups and First Nations; and fears of American cultural imperialism via the airwaves. In the late 20th century, Radio was largely overwhelmed by television, but still maintained a niche. In the 21st century, the central question is the impact of the Internet and smartphones on traditional broadcasting media.

Most Canadian-owned stations had weak signals compared with American stations. In the 1930s there were 60 Canadian stations but 40% of Canadians could only tune in American stations. Many stations simply rebroadcast American radio shows. Little funding was available for Canadian content. The most notable exceptions were religious radio shows, such as "Back to the Bible Hour," produced by Alberta's premier, William Aberhart, and the increasingly popularity of broadcast hockey games.

Pressure from Graham Spry and the Canadian Radio League encouraged Mackenzie King to request a Royal Commission on Radio Broadcasting. Its report called for a national radio network to encourage national sentiment. In 1932, the government of R.B. Bennett established the Canadian Radio Broadcasting Commission, transformed into the Canadian Broadcasting Corporation in 1936. CBC set up a French language network in Quebec and adjacent Francophone areas. Although the French language service had little competition from American stations, it proved quite conservative in technology and programming. It was closely aligned with powerful newspaper and Church interests and became a propaganda forum for the traditional elites of Quebec. It did not promote separatism or a sense of Québec nationalism.

== The Great Depression ==
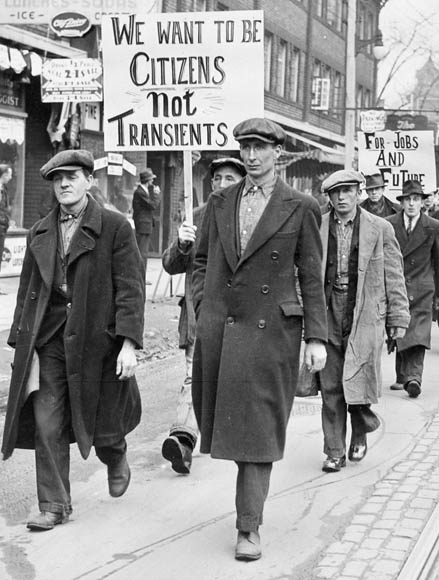
The Single Men's Unemployed Association parading to Bathurst Street United Church in Toronto

Canada was hard hit by the worldwide Great Depression that began in 1929. Between 1929 and 1933, the gross national product dropped 40% (compared to 37% in the US). Unemployment reached 27% at the depth of the Depression in 1933. Many businesses closed, as corporate profits of $396 million in 1929 turned into losses of $98 million in 1933. Canadian exports shrank by 50% from 1929 to 1933. Construction all but stopped (down 82%, 1929–33), and wholesale prices dropped 30%. Wheat prices plunged from 78c per bushel (1928 crop) to 29c in 1932.

Worst hit were areas dependent on primary industries such as farming, mining and logging, as prices fell and there were few alternative jobs. Most families had moderate losses and little hardship, though they too became pessimistic and their debts become heavier as prices fell. Some families saw most or all of their assets disappear, and suffered severely.

While the decline started in the United States, it quickly spread to Canada. The first industry affected was wheat farming, which saw a collapse in prices. This impoverished the economies of the Prairie provinces, but as wheat was then Canada's largest export it also hurt the rest of the country. With the collapse of the construction industry, lumbering was even worse hit, as there were few alternative jobs in the lumbering region. This was soon followed by a deep recession in manufacturing, first caused by a drop-off in demand in the United States, and then by Canadians also not buying more than bare essentials. The auto industry that prospered so greatly in the 1920s was badly hit. Construction came to a halt. People who lost jobs because of layoffs and closures had a very hard time finding a new ones—especially older men and teenagers. Unemployment rose to 25 per cent.

=== Government reaction ===
In 1930 in the first stage of the long depression, Prime Minister Mackenzie King believed that the crisis was a temporary swing of the business cycle and that the economy would soon recover without government intervention. He refused to provide unemployment relief or federal aid to the provinces, saying that if Conservative provincial governments demanded federal dollars he would not give them "a five cent piece." His blunt wisecrack was used to defeat the Liberals in the 1930 election. The main issue was the rapid deterioration in the economy and whether the prime minister was out of touch with the hardships of ordinary people. The winner of the 1930 election was Richard Bedford Bennett and the Conservatives. Bennett, a successful Western businessman, campaigned on high tariffs and large scale spending, but as deficits increased he became wary and cut back severely on Federal spending. With falling support and the depression only getting worse Bennett attempted to introduce policies based on the New Deal of President Franklin D. Roosevelt (FDR) in the United States, but this was largely unsuccessful. The government became a focus of popular discontent, even though its policies were largely the same as those of other Western governments. Canadian car owners who could no longer afford gasoline reverted to having their vehicles pulled by horses and dubbed them Bennett Buggies. Bennett's perceived failures during the Great Depression led to the re-election of Mackenzie King's Liberals in the 1935 election.

Although the United States began to see rapid improvements as a result of FDR's policies, Canada saw far less growth. Nevertheless, by 1936 the worst of the Depression was over. Mackenzie King implemented some relief programs such as the National Housing Act and National Employment Commission, and also established the Canadian Broadcasting Corporation (1936) and Trans-Canada Airlines (1937, the precursor to Air Canada). However, it took until 1939 and the outbreak of war for the Canadian economy to return to 1929 levels.

=== New parties ===
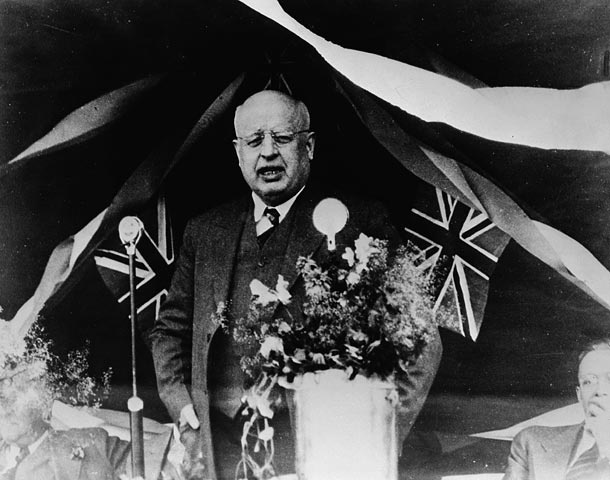
William Aberhart addresses a rally (1937)

The Progressive and United Farmers Parties had achieved some success in the 1920s, but during the 1930s, their members generally joined other parties, like the Social Credit movement and the Cooperative Commonwealth Federation.

In Alberta, a Christian radio broadcaster named William "Bible Bill" Aberhart became interested in politics partly because the Great Depression had been especially harsh on Albertan farmers. Particularly, he was drawn to the "social credit" theories of Major C. H. Douglas, a Scottish engineer. From 1932 to 1935, Aberhart lobbied for the governing political party, the United Farmers of Alberta, to adopt these theories. The basis of social credit is that the difference in production cost and individuals' purchasing power should be supplemented through government grants. When these efforts failed, Aberhart helped found the Social Credit Party of Alberta, which won the 1935 provincial election by a landslide with over 54% of the popular vote.

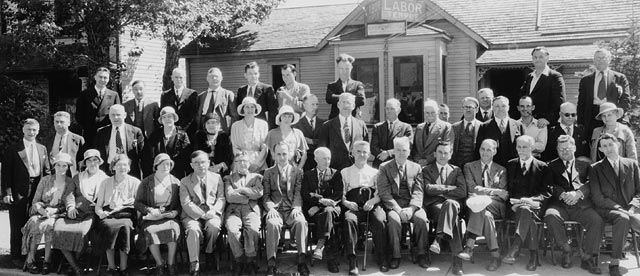
CCF founding meeting, Calgary, 1932

The Co-operative Commonwealth Federation (CCF) was founded in 1932 in Calgary, Alberta, by a number of socialist, farm, co-operative and labour groups, and the League for Social Reconstruction. The CCF aimed to alleviate the suffering of the Great Depression through economic reform and public "co-operation". Many of the party's first Members of Parliament (MPs) were former members of the Ginger Group of left-wing Progressive and Labour MPs. In its first election in 1935, seven CCF MPs were elected to the House of Commons of Canada. Eight were elected in the following election in 1940.

The period also saw the rise of the openly fascist National Unity Party (NUP) and the Communist Party of Canada, which was declared illegal under Section 98 of the Criminal Code from 1931 to 1936. The party continued to exist, but was under the constant threat of legal harassment, and was for all intents and purposes an underground organization until 1936. The party greatly contributed in the mobilization of volunteers to fight in the Spanish Civil War. The NUP and, again, the Communist Party were banned in 1940.

=== On to Ottawa Trek ===
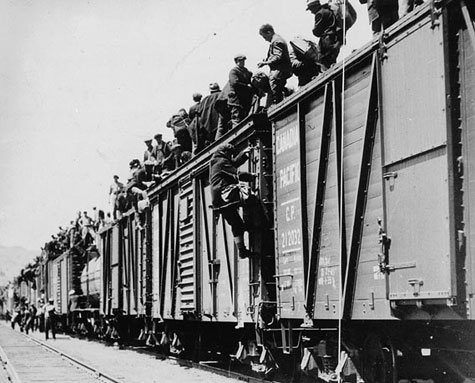
Strikers from unemployment relief camps climbing on boxcars in Kamloops, British Columbia

The depression had crippled the economy and left one in nine Canadians on relief. Nor did relief come free; the Bennett government had asked the Canadian Department of National Defense to organize work camps where the labour of unemployed single men was used to construct roads and other public works with little remuneration. The poor working conditions in the camps led to serious unrest, including a major strike in Vancouver in April 1935. The strikers' demands included adequate first aid equipment in the camps, the extension of the Workmen's Compensation Act to include camp workers, and that workers in camps be granted the right to vote in Federal elections. Public support was enormous, and the action snowballed into a bigger movement when the men decided to take their grievances to the federal government. In June 1935, hundreds of men boarded boxcars headed East in what would come to be known as the "On to Ottawa Trek".

The protest was halted, however, before it could reach the capital. In Regina, the Royal Canadian Mounted Police (RCMP) confined the protesters in a local stadium. Only the eight leaders of the protest were actually allowed to proceed to Ottawa, where they were granted a meeting with Prime Minister R.B. Bennett. Bennett attacked the group as radicals, and eventually had the delegation hustled out of his office. Upon returning to Regina to unite with the rest of the protesters, they organized large public rallies, which broke out into riots when the Federal government deployed police to break up the rallies and arrest the leaders. Two people were killed as a result of the riot and many more injured. When the trek was over the government provided free transportation back to the camps. These camps were soon abolished following Bennett's electoral defeat, and new, less extensive, relief work schemes were devised on farms and in forestry camps in conjunction with provincial governments, and pay rates changed from twenty-cents a day to five dollars a month.

== Canadian foreign policy in the Interwar Years ==
Canada played a limited role in world affairs before 1945, typically as a passive follower of British policies. From 1920 Canada was a founding member of the League of Nations and was granted full membership. But the Borden and King governments made it clear that "Canada lived 'in a fireproof house far from flammable materials' and felt no automatic obligation to the principle of collective security". Very much like the United States, after the Great War, Canada turned away from international politics. Instead, King focused his attention on good relations with the United States and on greater independence from Great Britain, moving into a position of near isolation. Thus, in 1922 King refused to support the British to enforce a peace settlement during the Chanak Crisis, when revolutionary Turkey attacked and drove out the Greeks in Asia Minor. At an Imperial Conference in 1923 it was agreed that no resolution was binding unless approved by each dominion parliament. Canada then for the first time signed a treaty (the 1923 Halibut Treaty with the US) without British participation, and it proceeded to establish its own embassy in Washington. Further steps to independence were the Balfour Declaration of 1926 and the Statute of Westminster in 1931.

Canadians were all the more preoccupied with domestic economic problems and chose to remain neutral throughout the 1930s. Japan's 1931 invasion of Manchuria raised little concern in Canada, as did Hitler's rise to power in 1933 or Italy's invasion of Ethiopia in 1935. The Canadian government declared its neutrality on the outbreak of the Spanish Civil War in 1936 where Francisco Franco lead a military uprising, supported with military hardware and tens of thousands of troops by Nazi Germany and Fascist Italy against the leftist Spanish government. Nevertheless, many Canadians volunteered to fight against Franco on behalf of the Spanish Republic in the International Brigades and couldn't be deterred by the Foreign Enlistment Act of 1937, outlawing participation by Canadians in foreign wars. Eventually, 1,546 Canadians participated, mainly in the Mackenzie-Papineau Battalion (also called "Mac-Paps") of which 721 were killed. Except for France, no other country gave as great a proportion of its population as volunteers in Spain than Canada.

Despite its expressed neutrality, in 1936, Canada began a modest program of rearmament and in 1937, King let Britain know that Canada would support the Empire in case of a war in Europe. He visited Germany in June 1937 and met with Adolf Hitler. Like many other political leaders of the time, King was seduced by Hitler's charm and rehearsed simplicity and he supported the policy of "appeasement" of Germany. King and other leaders remained quiet when Hitler annexed Austria in 1938 and Bohemia in 1939.

With the rise of anti-Semitism in Germany and the growing trickle of refugees arriving in the country, Canada began to actively restrict Jewish immigration by 1938. Frederick Charles Blair, the country's top immigration bureaucrat, raised the amount of money immigrants had to possess to come to Canada from $5,000 to $15,000. In addition, immigrants now had to prove they were farmers, which very few Jews coming from central Europe were. Senator Cairine Wilson was one of the country's leading voices against fascism and one of the few non-Jews lobbying for the refugees but she was unable to get Mackenzie King to intervene. For King himself shared the anti-Semitism of many Canadians; in his diary he wrote: "We must seek to keep this part of the continent free from unrest and from too great an intermixture of foreign strains of blood." "Through government inaction and Blair's bureaucratic anti-Semitism, Canada emerged from the war with one of the worst records of Jewish refugee resettlement in the world. Between 1933 and 1939, Canada accepted only 4,000 of the 800,000 Jews who had escaped from Nazi-controlled Europe."

== World War II ==
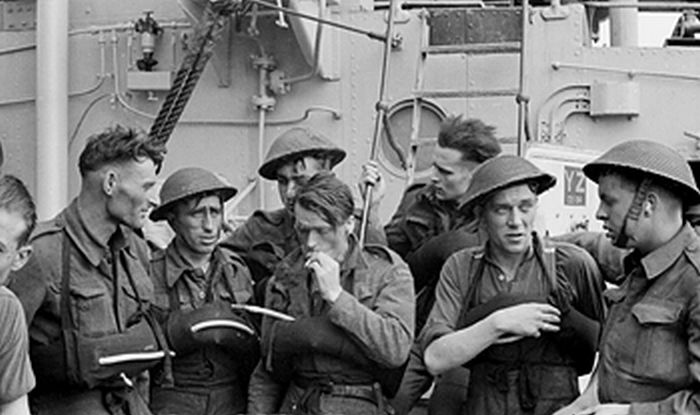
Canadian troops resting on board a destroyer after the Combined Operations daylight raid on Dieppe during World War II.

The Canadian economy, like the economies of many other countries, improved in an unexpected way with the outbreak of the Second World War. When Hitler invaded Poland on September 1, 1939, Mackenzie King was finally convinced that military action would be necessary, but advised George VI, King of Canada, to wait until September 10, after parliament had debated the matter, to declare war (unlike World War I, when Canada was automatically at war as soon as Britain was). Ultimately, more than one million Canadians served in armed forces.

=== Military accomplishments ===
One of Canada's major contributions to the war was the British Commonwealth Air Training Plan, in which over 140,000 Allied pilots and air crews received training at bases in Canada. Canada is widely recognized for its key role in the Battle of the Atlantic. The first major land actions of the war, at Hong Kong and Dieppe, were unsuccessful. The bulk of Canadian land forces remained undeployed until the landings in Sicily and Italy in 1943. In 1944, Canadian forces successfully captured Juno Beach during the Battle of Normandy, and by the autumn, an entire field army under Canadian command was instrumental in liberating the Netherlands, for which many Dutch still fondly remember Canadians today.

=== Women ===
Women began to play a more significant part in war efforts, joining the armed forces for the first time (aside from nursing) by means of the Canadian Women's Army Corps, the Royal Canadian Air Force Women's Division, and the Royal Canadian Naval Women's Service (Wrens). Although women were still not allowed to enter combat, they performed a number of other roles in clerical, administrative, and communications divisions. A total of 45,423 women enlisted during the course of the war, and one in nine served overseas.

With over a million Canadians serving in the Armed Forces during the war, enormous new employment opportunities appeared for women in workplaces previously unknown to them. To encourage women to work in factories, machine shops, and other heavy industries, the Canadian government offered free child-care and tax breaks. Elsie MacGill, an aeronautical engineer who supervised the production of Hawker Hurricane aircraft for the Canada Car and Foundry Company became a celebrated war hero known as "Queen of the Hurricanes."

=== Aid to the United Kingdom ===
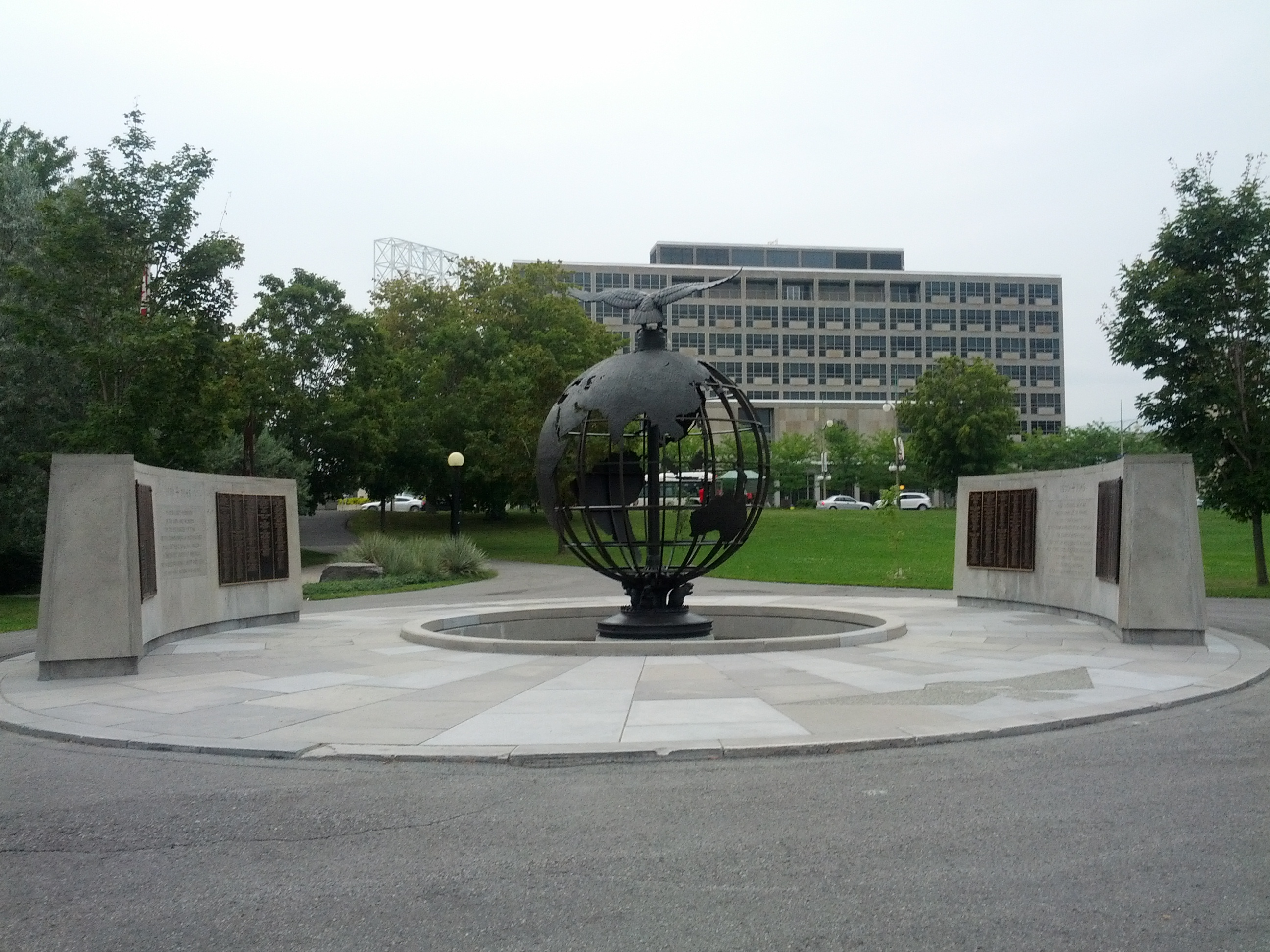
Monument to the Canadian soldiers who fought in World War II, in Ottawa.

The Gander Air Base now known as Gander International Airport built in 1936 in the Dominion of Newfoundland was leased by the UK to Canada for 99 years because of its urgent need for the movement of fighter and bomber aircraft to the UK. Canada gave the United Kingdom gifts totalling $3.5 billion during the war; the UK used it to buy Canadian food and war supplies.

=== The conscription crisis of 1944 ===
As in World War I, the number of volunteers began to run dry as the war dragged on. Mackenzie King had promised, like Borden, not to introduce conscription, though his position was somewhat ambiguous: as he declared to the House of Commons on June 10, 1942: "Not necessarily conscription but conscription if necessary."

With rising pressure from the people, on June 21, 1940, King passed the National Resources Mobilization Act (NRMA) which gave the government the power to "call out every man in Canada for military training for the defence of Canada", and only Canada. Conscripts could not be sent overseas to fight. English Canadians, expectedly, were displeased and took to calling these soldiers "zombies" who they stereotyped as French Canadians who were "sitting comfortably" while their countrymen died.

On April 27, 1942, Mackenzie King held a national plebiscite to decide on the issue, having made campaign promises to avoid conscription (and, it is thought, winning the election on that very point). The majority of English Canadians voted in favour of the conscription, while the majority of French Canadians did not. Nevertheless, the final result was a yes, which granted King the permission to bring in a conscription law if he wanted. However, the issue was put off for another two years, until November 1944 when King decided on a levy of NRMA troops for overseas service. There were riots in Quebec and a mutiny by conscripts based in Terrace, British Columbia. An aged Henri Bourassa also spoke out against the decision.

Some 13,000 NRMA men eventually left Canada, but only 2,463 reached units in the field before the end of the fighting. 69 died in battle.

=== Japanese internment ===
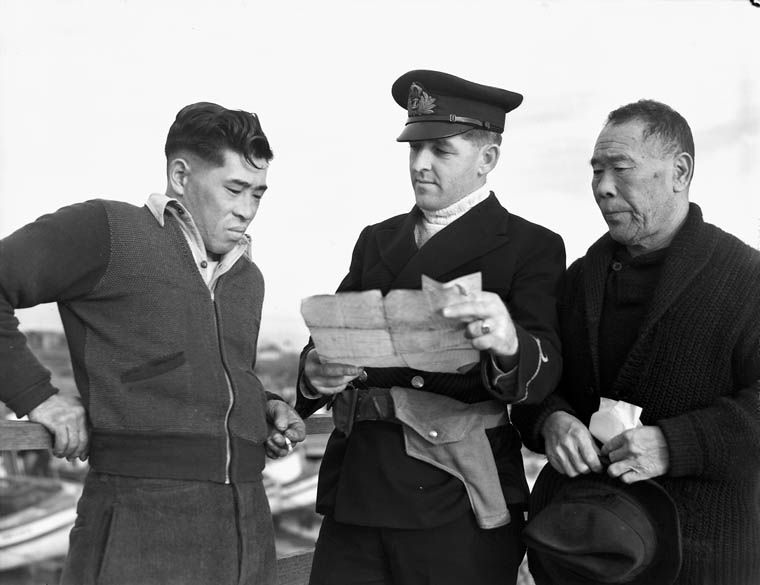
A R.C.N. officer questions Japanese-Canadian fisherman while confiscating their boat.

When Canada declared war on Japan in December 1941, members of the non-Japanese population of British Columbia, including municipal government offices, local newspapers and businesses called for the internment of the Japanese. In British Columbia, some claimed that Japanese residents who worked in the fishing industry were charting the coastline for the Japanese navy, and many of their boats were confiscated. The pressure from the public was so great that early in 1942 the government gave in to the pressure and began the internment of both Japanese nationals and Japanese Canadian citizens. Most of the nearly 22,000 people of Japanese descent who lived in Canada were naturalized or native-born citizens. Those unwilling to live in internment camps faced the possibility of deportation to Japan.

Unlike Japanese American internment, where families were generally kept together, Canada initially sent its male evacuees to road camps in the British Columbian interior, to sugar beet projects on the Prairies, or to internment in a POW camp in Ontario, while women and children were moved to six inland British Columbia towns. There, the living conditions were so poor that the citizens of wartime Japan even sent supplemental food shipments through the Red Cross. During the period of detention, the Canadian government spent one-third the per capita amount expended by the U.S. on Japanese American evacuees.

== See also ==
- History of Canadian foreign policy
- Heritage Minutes
- History of Canada
- History of the Canadian Army
- Military history of Canada

== Bibliography ==
- Allen, Ralph. Ordeal by Fire: Canada, 1910–1945 (1961), 492pp; popular history
- Bothwell, Robert, Ian Drummond, and John English. Canada 1900-1945. University of Toronto Press, 1987, textbook
- Encyclopædia Britannica (12th ed. 1922) comprises the 11th edition plus three new volumes 30-31-32 that cover events since 1911 with very thorough coverage of the war as well as every country and colony. Included also in 13th edition (1926) partly online
  - full text of vol 30 ABBE to ENGLISH HISTORY online free
- Stacey, C. P. Canada and the Age of Conflict: Volume 2: 1921-1948, The Mackenzie King Era (U of Toronto Press, 1981), scholarly history of foreign policy. online

=== War years ===
- Armstrong, Elizabeth H. The Crisis of Quebec, 1914-1918 (1937)
- Barker, Stacey, Krista Cooke, and Molly McCullough, eds Material Traces of War: Stories of Canadian Women and Conflict, 1914—1945 (University of Ottawa Press, 2021).
- Broad, Graham. A Small Price to Pay: Consumer Culture on the Canadian Home Front, 1939–45 (2013)
- Broadfoot, Barry. Six War Years 1939-1945: Memories of Canadians at Home and Abroad (1974)
- Bryce, Robert Broughton (2005). Canada and the cost of World War II. McGill-Queen's University Press. ISBN 978-0-7735-2938-0.
- Chartrand, René; Volstad, Ronald (2001). Canadian Forces in World War II. Osprey Publishing. ISBN 1-84176-302-0.
- Ciment, James; Thaddeus Russell (2007). The Home Front Encyclopedia: United States, Britain, and Canada in World Wars I and II. ABC-CLIO. ISBN 9781576078495.
- Cook, Tim. Warlords: Borden, Mackenzie King, and Canada's World Wars (2012) online
- Cook, Tim (1999). No Place to Run: The Canadian Corps and Gas Warfare in the First World War. UBC Press. ISBN 0-7748-0739-3.
- Cook, Tim. "Canada and the Great War." The RUSI Journal (2014) 159#4 pp: 56–64.
- Dickson, Paul. A Thoroughly Canadian General: A Biography of General H.D.G. Crerar (2007)
- Dunmore, Spencer. Wings for Victory: The Remarkable Story of the British Commonwealth Air Training Plan in Canada (McClelland & Stewart, 1994), World War II.
- Freeman, Bill; Richard Nielsen (1998). Far from home: Canadians in the First World War. McGraw-Hill Ryerson. ISBN 0-07-086118-8.
- Granatstein, J. L. Canada's War: The Politics of the Mackenzie King Government, 1939-1945 (1990) online
- Granatstein; J. L. The Generals: The Canadian Army's Senior Commanders in the Second World War (University of Calgary Press, 2005) online
- Hayes, Geoffrey, Mike Bechthold and Matt Symes. Canada and the Second World War: Essays in Honour of Terry Copp (2014)
- Henderson, Jarett, and Jeff Keshen. "Introduction: Canadian Perspectives on the First World War." Histoire sociale/Social history (2014) 47#4 pp: 283–290.
- MacKenzie, David, ed. Canada and the First World War (2005), 16 essays by leading scholars
- Moore, Christopher. "1914 in 2014: What We Commemorate When We Commemorate the First World War." Canadian Historical Review (2014) 95#3 pp: 427–432.
- Pierson, Ruth Roach. 'They're still women after all': the Second World War and Canadian Womanhood (1986)
- Perrun, Jody. The Patriotic Consensus: Unity, Morale, and the Second World War in Winnipeg (2014)
- Rickard, John. Politics of Command: Lieutenant-General A.G.L. McNaughton and the Canadian Army, 1939-1943 (2009)
- Stacey, C. P. Arms, Men and Governments: The War Policies of Canada 1939–1945 (1970), the standard scholarly history of WWII policies; online free
- Tennyson, Brian Douglas. Canada's Great War, 1914-1918: How Canada Helped Save the British Empire and Became a North American Nation (2014).

=== Interwar years ===
- Archibald, W. Peter. "Distress, dissent and alienation: Hamilton workers in the Great Depression." Urban History Review 21.1 (1992): 3-32. online
- Armstrong, Alex, and Frank D. Lewis. "Transatlantic wage gaps and the migration decision: Europe-Canada in the 1920s." Cliometrica 11.2 (2017): 153+.
- Berton, Pierre. The Great Depression: 1929-1939 (2001) ISBN 0-385-65843-5; popular history; online
- Campbell, Lara A. Respectable Citizens: Gender, Family, and Unemployment in Ontario's Great Depression (U of Toronto Press, 2009).
- Choudhri, Ehsan U., and Lawrence Schembri. "A tale of two countries and two booms, Canada and the United States in the 1920s and the 2000s: The roles of monetary and financial stability policies." International Review of Economics and Finance Working Paper 44_13, (Rimini Centre for Economic Analysis, 2013) online).
- Cotter, Charis. Toronto Between the Wars: Life in the City 1919-1939 (Firefly Books, 2012).
- Graham, Sean. As Canadian as Possible: The Canadian Broadcasting Corporation, 1936-1939 (2014).
- Guard, Julie. "A mighty power against the cost of living: Canadian housewives organize in the 1930s." International Labor and Working-Class History 77.1 (2010): 27-47. online
- Horn, Michiel. The great depression of the 1930s in Canada (Canadian Historical Association, 1984), 22pp overview online
- Horn, Michiel. The Dirty Thirties (1972) documentary overview.
- Huberman, Michael, and Denise Young. "Hope against hope: strike activity in Canada, 1920–1939." Explorations in Economic History 39.3 (2002): 315-354. online
- Light, Beth, and Ruth Roach Pierson, eds. No easy road: Women in Canada 1920s to 1960s (New Hogtown Press, 1990).
- Linteau, Paul-André, et al. Quebec since 1930 (James Lorimer & Company, 1991).
- Mchenry, Dean E. "Saskatchewan Under CCF Rule." in The Third Force in Canada (U of California Press, 2020 pp. 206-264.
- Menkis, Richard, and Harold Troper. More than just games: Canada and the 1936 Olympics (U of Toronto Press, 2015).
- Neatby, H. Blair. The Politics of Chaos: Canada in the Thirties (1972) online broad scholarly survey
- Nicholas, Jane. The Modern Girl: Feminine Modernities, the Body, and Commodities in the 1920s (University of Toronto Press, 2015).
- Safarian, A.E. The Canadian Economy in the Great Depression (1959), a standard history online
- Sandemose, Aksel. Aksel Sandemose and Canada: a Scandinavian writer's perception of the Canadian Prairies in the 1920s (2005) online
- Siegfried, André. Canada (1937) wide ranging survey of politics, economics and society. online
- Srigley, Katrina. Breadwinning Daughters: Young Working Women in a Depression-era City, 1929-1939 (U of Toronto Press, 2010).
- Strong-Boag, Veronica. "Pulling in double harness or hauling a double load: Women, work and feminism on the Canadian prairie." Journal of Canadian Studies 21.3 (1986): 32-52.
- Struthers, James. No Fault of Their Own: Unemployment and the Canadian Welfare State, 1914–1941 (U of Toronto Press, 1983).
- Tarr, E. J. "Canada in World Affairs," International Affairs (1937) 16#5 pp. 676–697 in JSTOR
- Taschereau, Sylvie, and Yvan Rousseau. "The Hidden Face of Consumption: Extending Credit to the Urban Masses in Montreal (1920s–40s)." Canadian Historical Review 100.4 (2019): 509-539.
- Vigod, Bernard L. "The Quebec Government and Social Legislation during the 1930s: A Study in Political Self-Destruction." Journal of Canadian Studies 14.1 (1979): 59-69
- Vipond, Mary. "Canadian Nationalism and the Plight of Canadian Magazines in the 1920s." Canadian Historical Review 58.1 (1977): 43-65.

=== Historiography and memory ===
- Cook, Tim. "Battles of the Imagined Past: Canada's Great War and Memory." Canadian Historical Review (2014) 95#3 pp: 417–426.
- Granatstein, J.L. "'What is to be Done?' The Future of Canadian Second World War History" Canadian Military Journal (2011) 11+
- Mason, Jody. Writing Unemployment: Worklessness, Mobility, and Citizenship in Twentieth-Century Canadian Literatures (University of Toronto Press, 2017).
- Shaw, Amy. "Expanding the Narrative: A First World War with Women, Children, and Grief," Canadian Historical Review (2014) 95#3 pp 398–406. online
