= History of Canadian foreign policy =

The foreign policies of Canada and its predecessor colonies were under British control until the 20th century. This included wars with the United States in 1775-1783 and 1812–1815. Economic ties with the U.S. were always close. Political tensions arose in the 19th century from anti-British sentiment in the U.S in the 1860s. Boundary issues caused diplomatic disputes resolved in the 1840s over the Maine boundary and in the early 20th century over the Alaska boundary. There is ongoing discussion regarding the Arctic.

Canada participated in Britain's wars, especially the Boer war, World War I and World War II. However, there was a bitter dispute between Francophone and Anglophone Canada during the First World War. Canada had its own seat in the League of Nations but played a small role in world affairs until the 1940s.

The "golden age of Canadian diplomacy" refers to a period in Canadian history, typically considered to be the mid-twentieth century, when Canada experienced a high level of success in its foreign relations and diplomatic efforts. In the early Cold-War years, Canada served as a mediator in international conflicts, and has since fostered a very positive reputation on the world stage, widely viewed as a responsible and ethical country.

== History ==
=== Colonial era to 1867 ===
The British North American colonies which today constitute modern Canada had no control over their foreign affairs until the achievement of responsible government in the late 1840s. Up to that time, negotiations were carried out by the governors appointed by the British government to encourage immigration, settle local disputes and to promote trade.

==== Disputes with the United States ====
===== American Revolution =====
The Treaty of Paris in 1783 formally ended the war. Britain made several concessions to the United States at the expense of the North American colonies. Notably, the borders between Canada and the United States were officially demarcated; all land south of the Great Lakes, which was formerly a part of the Province of Quebec and included modern-day Michigan, Illinois and Ohio, was ceded to the Americans as the Northwest Territory. Fishing rights were also granted to the United States in the Gulf of St. Lawrence and on the coast of Newfoundland and the Grand Banks.

Britain ignored part of the treaty and maintained their military outposts in the Great Lakes areas it had ceded to the U.S., and they continued to supply their Native American allies with munitions. The British evacuated the outposts with the Jay Treaty of 1795, but the continued supply of munitions irritated the Americans in the run-up to the War of 1812.

===== Other interactions =====
Notable interactions from the colonial period include the Nootka Convention, the War of 1812, the Rush–Bagot Treaty, the Treaty of 1818, the Webster–Ashburton Treaty, and the Oregon Treaty. Before the granting of responsible government, British diplomats handled foreign affairs and had the goal of achieving British goals, especially peace with the United States; domestic Canadian interests were secondary. The Canadian–American Reciprocity Treaty of 1854 signalled an important change in relations between Britain and its North American colonies. In this treaty, the Canadas were allowed to impose tariff duties more favourable to a foreign country (the U.S.) than to Britain, a precedent that was extended by new tariffs in 1859, 1879 and 1887, despite angry demands on the part of British industrialists that these tariffs be disallowed by London.

On a much smaller scale, Irish activists called Fenians based in the United States launched several tiny raids into Canada, in 1866-1871. All were quickly repulsed. One factor leading to confederation was the greatly exaggerated fear in Canada that the U.S. might seize Canada after winning the American Civil War.

=== Dominion of Canada: 1867-1914 ===
Soon after Canadian Confederation, the first prime minister Sir John A. Macdonald appointed Sir John Rose as his lobbyist in London. When Alexander Mackenzie became prime minister, he sent George Brown to represent Canada in Washington during British-American trade talks. After the Conservative Party came back to power in 1878, the government sent Alexander Galt to London, as well as to France and Spain. Although the British government was concerned about this nascent Canadian diplomacy, it finally consented to giving Galt the formal title of High Commissioner in 1880. A trade commissioner was appointed to Australia in 1894. As High Commissioner, Charles Tupper helped negotiate an agreement with France in 1893 but it was countersigned by the British ambassador as the Queen's official representative to France. Meanwhile, in 1882 the province of Quebec made its first of many forays into the international community by sending a representative, Hector Fabre to Paris in 1882.

Canada's responses to international events elsewhere were limited at this time. During 1878 tensions between Britain and Russia, for example, Canada constructed a few limited defences but did little else. By the time of the British campaign in Sudan of 1884–85, however, Canada was expected to contribute troops. Since Ottawa was reluctant to become involved, the Governor General of Canada privately raised 386 voyageurs at Britain's expense to help British forces on the Nile river. By 1885, many Canadians offered to volunteer as part of a potential Canadian force, however the government declined to act. This stood in sharp contrast to Australia (New South Wales), which raised and paid for its own troops.

According to Carman Miller, Canada took a strong interest in the Second Boer War, 1899–1902, when the British with great difficulty suppressed the Boer movement in South Africa. Support for the war was strong in the Anglophone community, as thousands of ambitious young men volunteered and fought. However, there was resistance in rural Canada, the labor movement, non-Anglican clergyman, and the large Irish Catholic community, as well as the smaller Dutch and German communities. Supporters saw an opportunity to assert that Canadian national identity was compatible with ties with the mother country. That alliance, they felt, would help protect them from American threats. Other supporters identified strongly with the pan-Britannic theme, cheering for "Queen and country!" The French Canadian community realized how different it was from Britannia, and began launching separatist movements.

The first Canadian commercial representative abroad was John Short Larke. Larke became Canada's first trade commissioner following a successful trade delegation to Australia led by Canada's first Minister of Trade and Commerce, Mackenzie Bowell.

The Alaska boundary dispute, simmering since the US purchased Alaska from Russia of 1867, became critical when gold was discovered in the Canadian Yukon during the late 1890s. Alaska controlled all the possible ports of entry. Canada argued its boundary included the port of Skagway, held by the U.S.. The dispute went to arbitration in 1903, but the British delegate sided with the Americans, angering Canadians who felt the British had betrayed Canadian interests to curry favour with the U.S.

In 1909, Prime Minister Wilfrid Laurier reluctantly established a Department of External Affairs and the positions of Secretary and Under-Secretary of State for External Affairs, largely at the urging of the Governor-General Earl Grey and James Bryce, the British ambassador in Washington, who estimated that three-quarters of his embassy's time was devoted to Canadian-American matters.

Laurier signed a reciprocity treaty with the U.S. that would lower tariffs in both directions. Conservatives under Robert Borden denounced it, saying it would integrate Canada's economy into that of the U.S. and loosen ties with Britain. The Conservative party won the 1911 Canadian federal election.

=== 1914-1929 ===
==== First World War ====
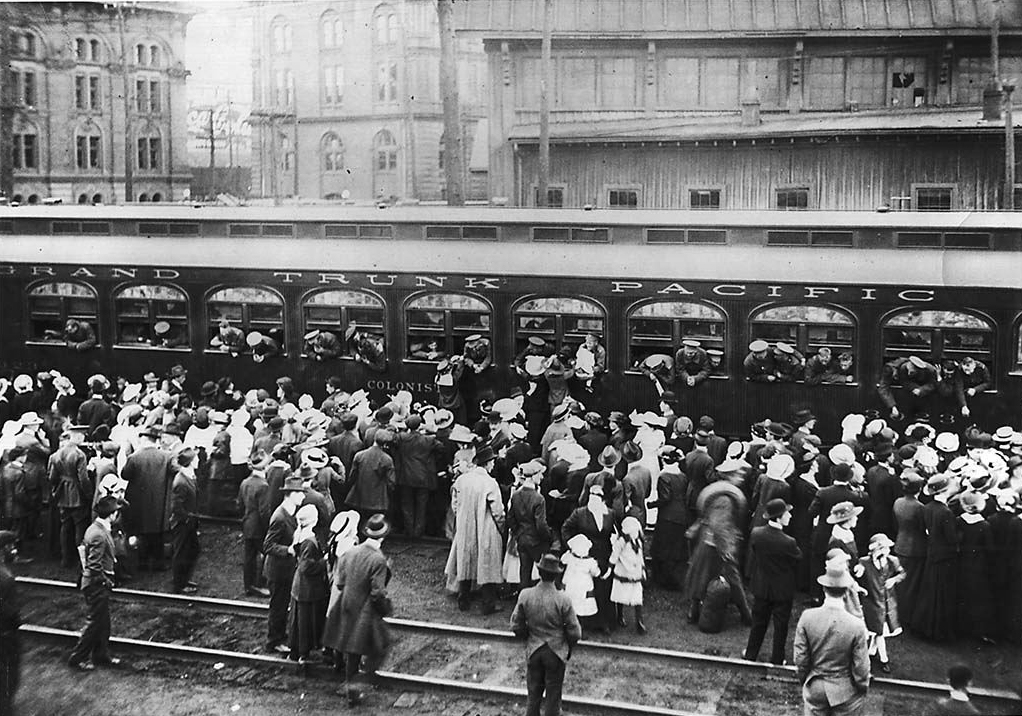
Civilians hail a trainload of soldiers departing from Toronto shortly after war began in August 1914

The Canadian Forces and civilian participation in the First World War helped to foster a sense of British-Canadian nationhood. The British-oriented population was empowered, and everyone else was marginalized, especially the French, Irish Catholic, and East European elements. The famous military achievements came during the Somme, Vimy, Passchendaele battles and what later became known as "Canada's Hundred Days". The costs were high: 67,000 killed and 173,000.

British Canadians were annoyed in 1914-16 when Washington insisted on neutrality and seemed to profit heavily while Canada was sacrificing its wealth and its youth. However, when the US finally declared war on Germany in April 1917, there was swift cooperation and friendly coordination, as one historian report:

Official co-operation between Canada and the United States—the pooling of grain, fuel, power, and transportation resources, the underwriting of a Canadian loan by bankers of New York—produced a good effect on the public mind. Canadian recruiting detachments were welcomed in the United States, while a reciprocal agreement was ratified to facilitate the return of draft-evaders. A Canadian War Mission was established at Washington, and many other ways the activities of the two countries were coordinated for efficiency. Immigration regulations were relaxed and thousands of American farmhands crossed the border to assist in harvesting the Canadian crops. Officially and publicly, at least, the two nations were on better terms than ever before in their history, and on the American side this attitude extended through almost all classes of society.

Support for Britain caused a major political crisis over conscription, as Francophones, especially in Quebec, rejected national policies. The Austro-Hungarian Empire was an enemy in the war. Large numbers of its emigrants had settled in the Prairie Provinces. Some 8,000 were classified as enemy aliens, and were interred in camps. Another 80,000 had to report regularly to the local police.

The Liberal party was deeply split, with most of its Anglophone leaders joining the unionist government headed by Prime Minister Robert Borden, the leader of the Conservative party. The Liberals regained their influence after the war under the leadership of William Lyon Mackenzie King, who served as prime minister with three separate terms between 1921 and 1949.

As its reward for significant contributions to the victory, Prime Minister Sir Robert Borden won London's approval that Canada be treated as a separate signatory to the Treaty of Versailles.

==== 1920s ====
After Canada shared in victory in the First World War, there were two alternative strategies for Canada's foreign policy, according to C.P. Stacey. The Conservative Party, under prime ministers Robert Borden and Arthur Meighen, called for close cooperation with London as part of the British Empire. This carried on the wartime coalition built on pro-British elements. However the Liberal Party, under its new leader Mackenzie King, sought a nationalistic and isolationist approach of the sort that appealed to the French Canadian element, as well as other non-British ethnic groups. King, acting as his own Foreign Minister, achieved his goal by close cooperation with his Under-Secretary of State for External Affairs, Oscar D. Skelton, and with Clifford Sifton, the influential newspaperman from Manitoba.

In January 1920 Canada was a founding member of the League of Nations and was granted full membership. It acted independently of London. It was elected to the League Council (governing board) in 1927. It did not play a leading role, and generally opposed sanctions or military action by the League. The League was virtually defunct by 1939. Both the Borden and King governments made it clear that "Canada lived 'in a fireproof house far from flammable materials' and felt no automatic obligation to the principle of collective security". Very much like the United States, Canada turned away from international politics. Instead, King focused his attention on good relations with the United States and on greater independence from Great Britain, moving into a position of near isolation. Thus, in 1922 King refused to support the British to enforce a peace settlement during the Chanak Crisis, when the revolutionary Government of the Grand National Assembly attacked and drove out the Greeks in Turkey.

The government operated a Canadian War Mission in Washington, 1918 to 1921, but it was not until King became Prime Minister in 1921 that Canada seriously pursued an independent foreign policy. At an Imperial Conference in 1923 it was agreed that no resolution was binding unless approved by each dominion parliament. Canada then for the first time signed a treaty (the 1923 Halibut Treaty with the US) without British participation, and it proceeded to establish its own embassy in Washington. Further steps to external sovereignty were the Balfour Declaration of 1926 and the Statute of Westminster in 1931. In 1923, Canada independently signed the Halibut Treaty with the United States at Mackenzie King's insistence – the first time Canada signed a treaty without the British also signing it. In 1925, the government appointed a permanent diplomat to Geneva to deal with the League of Nations and International Labour Organization. Following the Balfour Declaration of 1926, King appointed Vincent Massey as the first Canadian minister plenipotentiary in Washington (1926), raised the office in Paris to legation status under Philippe Roy (1928), and opened a legation in Tokyo with Herbert Marler as envoy (1929). Canada finally achieved legislative independence with the enactment of the Statute of Westminster in 1931, although British diplomatic missions continued to represent Canada in most countries throughout the 1930s.

=== 1930s ===
Canada was pulled into the Great Depression in 1929 by the economic recession in the U.S. There was a tariff war with Washington and foreign trade dried up while unemployment soared. The economy shrank by 40% in terms of gross domestic product. Canadians were all the more preoccupied with domestic economic problems. With little dissent Canada chose to remain neutral throughout the 1930s. Japan's invasion of Manchuria raised little concern in Canada, nor did Hitler's rise to power in 1933 or Italy's invasion of Ethiopia in 1935.

The government declared its neutrality on the outbreak of the Spanish Civil War in 1936 where Francisco Franco led a military uprising, supported with military hardware and tens of thousands of troops by Nazi Germany and Fascist Italy against the Second Spanish Republic. The insurgents won the civil war in 1939. The Communist Party of Canada encouraged young men to volunteer to fight for the Spanish Republic in the International Brigades. They were not deterred by the Foreign Enlistment Act of 1937, outlawing participation by Canadians in foreign wars. Eventually, 1,546 Canadians participated, mainly in the Mackenzie-Papineau Battalion (also called "Mac-Paps") of whom 721 were killed. Except for France, no other country gave as great a proportion of its population as volunteers in Spain than Canada.

Despite its expressed neutrality, in 1936, Canada began a modest program of rearmament and in 1937, King let Britain know that Canada would support it in case of a war in Europe. He visited Germany in June 1937 and met with Adolf Hitler. Like many other political leaders of the time, King was seduced by Hitler's charm and rehearsed simplicity. He supported the policy of "appeasement" of Germany. King and other leaders remained quiet when Hitler annexed Austria in 1938 and Bohemia in 1939.

With the rise of anti-Semitism in Germany and the growing trickle of refugees arriving in the country, Canada began to actively restrict Jewish immigration by 1938. Frederick Charles Blair, the country's top immigration official, raised the amount of money immigrants had to possess to come to Canada from $5,000 to $15,000. King himself shared the anti-Semitism of many Canadians; in his diary he wrote: "We must seek to keep this part of the continent free from unrest and from too great an intermixture of foreign strains of blood."

"Through government inaction and Blair's bureaucratic anti-Semitism, Canada emerged from the war with one of the worst records of Jewish refugee resettlement in the world. Between 1933 and 1939, Canada accepted only 4,000 of the 800,000 Jews who had escaped from Nazi-controlled Europe."

=== World War II 1939-1945 ===
In 1939, the King government began to abandon its support of appeasement and publicly warned that it would support Britain in the event of a war. After the outbreak of World War II in September 1939, Canada rapidly expanded its army, navy and air forces.

Ugly rumours of Japanese spies and saboteurs, combined with long-standing hostility toward Japanese Canadians, led to the internment in inland camps of 21,000 Japanese.

To re-arm Canada, King built the Royal Canadian Air Force as a viable military power, while at the same time keeping it separate from Britain's Royal Air Force. He was instrumental in obtaining the British Commonwealth Air Training Plan Agreement, which was signed in Ottawa in December 1939, binding Canada, Britain, New Zealand and Australia to a program that eventually trained half the airmen from those four nations in the Second World War.

King linked Canada more and more closely to the United States, signing an agreement with Roosevelt at Ogdensburg, New York, in August 1940 that provided for the close cooperation of Canadian and American forces, despite the fact that the U.S. remained officially neutral until the bombing of Pearl Harbor on December 7, 1941. During the war the Americans took virtual control of the Yukon in building the Alaska Highway, and major airbases in Newfoundland, at that time under British governance.

In designing the strategy for victory in World War Two, Canada was largely ignored by British Prime Minister Winston Churchill and President Franklin D Roosevelt. Nevertheless, Canada did play an important role in mobilizing and training troops and munitions, and in supplying food. to Britain. and money

Its military roles included the training airmen for the Commonwealth, guarding the western half of the North Atlantic Ocean against German U-boats, and providing combat troops for the invasions of Italy, France and Germany in 1943–45.

Canada proved highly successful in mobilizing its economy for war, with impressive results in industrial and agricultural output. The depression ended, prosperity returned, and Canada's economy expanded significantly.

During the war, Canada rapidly expanded its diplomatic missions abroad. While Canada hosted two major Allied conferences in Quebec in 1943 and 1944, neither King nor his senior diplomats, generals and admirals were invited to take part in any of the discussions.

=== 1945 to 1957 ===
The Canadian Institute of International Affairs (CIIA) has long been the intellectual centre of foreign policy thinking. Its current name is the "Canadian International Council". Under businessman Edgar Tarr, 1931 to 1950, the CIIA went beyond the original neutral and apolitical research role. Instead it championed Canadian national autonomy and sought to enlarge the nation's international role, while challenging British imperialism. Numerous diplomats attended its conferences and supported its new mission. Canada's foreign policy moved away from classical imperialism and toward the modern approach by the United States. CIIA leaders and Canadian officials worked to encouraged nationalist forces in India, China, and Southeast Asia that sought to reject colonial rule and Western dominance.

According to Hector Mackenzie, the myth of a glorious postwar era in Canada's international relations is common in memoirs and biographies of Canadian diplomats, journalism and popular commentary. It sometimes appears in scholarly studies. This story is used as evidence of Canada's exceptionalism, its special world mission and its supposed deeply felt internationalism. It is easy to take this myth as a standard against which recent history is judged. Mackenzie argues the myth is deeply mistaken especially regarding Canadian motives and achievements in world affairs during 1939 to 1957. Diplomats reminiscing about the postwar era stress the outsized role of Lester B. Pearson; they fondly call the 1940s and 1950s a "golden era" of Canadian foreign policy. It is matched against the isolationism of the 1930s, which James Eayrs called a low, dishonest decade." However, the Golden Era tag has been challenged as a romantic exaggeration. Prime Minister William Lyon Mackenzie King, working closely with his Foreign Minister Louis St. Laurent, handled foreign relations 1945–48 in cautious fashion. Canada lent and donated over $2 billion to Britain to help it rebuild (by purchasing Canadian exports). It was elected to the UN Security Council. It helped design NATO. However, Mackenzie King rejected free trade with the United States, and decided not to play a role in the Berlin airlift. Canada had been actively involved in the League of Nations, primarily because it could act separately from Britain. It played a modest role in the postwar formation of the United Nations, as well as the International Monetary Fund. It played a somewhat larger role in 1947 in designing the General Agreement on Tariffs and Trade. Ties with Great Britain gradually weakened, especially in 1956 when Canada refused to support the British and French invasion of Egypt in order to seize the Suez Canal. Liberal Lester B. Pearson as External Affairs Minister (foreign minister) won the Nobel Peace Prize for organizing the United Nations Emergency Force in 1956 to resolve the Suez Canal Crisis.

From 1939 to 1968, foreign policy was based on close relationships with the United States, especially in trade and defence policy, with Canada an active member of NATO as well as a bilateral partner with the United States in forming a northern defence against Soviet Air Force strategic bombers. In 1950–53, Canada sent troops to the Korean War in defence of South Korea.

For Lester Pearson, cultural differences, Francophone versus Anglophone, could perhaps be narrowed by involvement in world affairs. Canadians could gain a broader, more cosmopolitan, more liberal outlook. A sense of national identity, built on the middle size nation thesis, was possible. Perhaps international commitment would produce a sense of purpose and thereby unite Canadians.

There were voices on both left and right that warned against being too close to the United States. Few Canadians listened before 1957. Instead, there was wide consensus on Canadian foreign and defence policies 1948 to 1957. Bothwell, Drummond and English state:

That support was remarkably uniform geographically and racially, both coast to coast and among French and English. From the CCF on the left to the Social Credit on the right, the political parties agreed that NATO was a good thing, and communism a bad thing, that a close association with Europe was desirable, and that the Commonwealth embodied a glorious past.

However the consensus did not last. By 1957 the Suez crisis alienated Canada from both Britain and France; politicians distrusted American leadership, businessmen questioned American financial investments; and intellectuals ridiculed the values of American television and Hollywood offerings that all Canadians watched. "Public support for Canada's foreign policy big came unstuck. Foreign-policy, from being a winning issue for the Liberals, was fast becoming a losing one."

=== 1957 to 2006 ===
The general pattern in the 20th century, for the Liberal Party, especially when it controlled the government under Laurier (1896–1911) and Mackenzie King (1921–1930, 1935–1948), to favour closer ties with the United States, often at the expense of Great Britain and the British Commonwealth. The Conservative party, on the other hand, with its voting base in the British element, took the opposite position. Thus the Conservatives defeated the 1911 reciprocity treaty with the United States, and took the lead in supporting Britain in the First World War, wild working feverishly to suppress anti-British sentiment in Québec and the Prairie provinces. However John Diefenbaker, the conservative Prime Minister 1957–1963, was shocked to discover that the British were serious about entry into the Common Market. The Conservatives saw this as a betrayal of the Commonwealth ideal, and led the opposition to London's plans. French President Charles de Gaulle vetoed London's application, but it finally joined in 1975, with the result of weakening ties to Canada and the Commonwealth.

==== Peacekeeping ====
The success of the Suez peacekeeping mission led Canadians to embrace peacekeeping as a suitable role for a middle-sized country, looking for a role, and having high regards for the United Nations. Canada's role in the development of peacekeeping during the late 20th century led to the reputation as a prominent player in world affairs. Canada's commitment to multilateralism has been closely related to peacekeeping efforts. Canadian Nobel Peace Prize laureate Lester B. Pearson was the father of modern United Nations Peacekeeping. Prior to Canada's role in the Suez Canal Crisis, Canada was viewed by many as insignificant in issues of the world's traditional powers. Canada's successful role in the conflict gave Canada credibility and established it as a nation fighting for the common good of all the world's nations and not just their allies.

Canada sent a peacekeeping force to Cyprus in 1964, when two NATO members, Greece and Turkey, were at swords' point over ethnic violence between Greeks and Turks in the historic British colony. The Canadians left in 1993 after 28 were killed and many wounded in the operation. Peacekeeping help was needed in the Belgian Congo in 1960–64, after Belgium pulled out. There were numerous other small interventions. Canada took a central role in the International Control Commission (ICC), which tried to broker peace in the Vietnam War in the 1960s.

In 1993 violent misbehavior by Canadian peacekeeping forces in Somalia shocked the nation.

Since 1995, Canadian direct participation in United Nations peacekeeping efforts has greatly declined. That number decreased largely because Canada began to direct its participation to UN-sanctioned military operations through NATO, rather than through the UN. In July 2006, for instance, Canada ranked 51st on the list of UN peacekeepers, contributing 130 peacekeepers out of a total UN deployment of over 70,000; whereas in November 1990 Canada had 1,002 troops out of a total UN deployment of 10,304.

==== Relations with US and others ====
US President Dwight D. Eisenhower took pains to foster good relations with Progressive Conservative John Diefenbaker (1957–1963) . That led to approval of plans to join together in NORAD, an integrated air defence system, in mid-1957. Relations with President John F. Kennedy were much less cordial. Diefenbaker opposed apartheid in the South Africa and helped force it out of the Commonwealth of Nations. His indecision on whether to accept Bomarc nuclear missiles from the United States led to his government's downfall.

The Vietnam War (1964–1975) was very unpopular in Canada, which provided only minimal diplomatic support and no military participation. Liberal Lester B. Pearson as Prime Minister (1963–1968) avoided any involvement in Vietnam. Foreign affairs was not high on his agenda, as he concentrated on complex internal political problems.

Under Liberal Prime Minister Pierre Trudeau (1968–1979 and 1980–1984) foreign policy was much less important than internal unity. There were multiple new approaches, some of which involved standing apart from the United States. Trudeau recognized the People's Republic of China shortly before the United States did, improved relationships with the Soviet Union, and cut back on contributions to NATO. While not cutting back on trade with the United States, he did emphasize improved trade with Europe and Asia. By his third year in office, however, Trudeau launched a new initiative, emphasizing Canada's role as a middle power with the ability to engage in active peacekeeping operations under the auspices of the United Nations. Foreign aid was expanded, especially to the non-white Commonwealth. Canada joined most of NATO in imposing sanctions on the Soviet Union for its invasion of Afghanistan in 1979–80. President Ronald Reagan took office in Washington in 1981, and relationships cooled. However, when Iraq invaded Kuwait in 1990, Canada joined most of NATO and sending troops to the Persian Gulf war. Although Canada remained part of NATO, a strong military presence was considered unnecessary by 1964, and funding was diverted into peacekeeping missions. Only 20,000 soldiers were left. In 2006, Andrew Richter called this, "Forty years of neglect, indifference, and apathy."

Québec started operating its own foreign policy in the 1960s, so that in key countries Canada had two separate missions with diverging priorities.

=== 2006 to present ===
==== Stephen Harper ====
The Conservative Party Government of Canada led by Prime Minister Stephen Harper has been characterized as a great break from the previous 70 years of post-war Canadian diplomacy. Indeed, Harper moved away from the multilateral and internationalist policies of the Liberal Party, and reduced Canada's emphasis on the United Nations, peacekeeping, conflict resolution, and multilateralism. Harper's foreign policy has been described as "ideological", incoherent" and "diaspora-driven".

Harper sought to strengthen cooperation with the United States, particularly in their War on terror. As part of this policy, his government continued and expanded Canada's participation in the US-led War in Afghanistan. Harper also led Canada in the Libyan civil war and the Syrian civil war. In parallel, Harper showed relentless support for Israel throughout his whole premiership.

==== Justin Trudeau ====
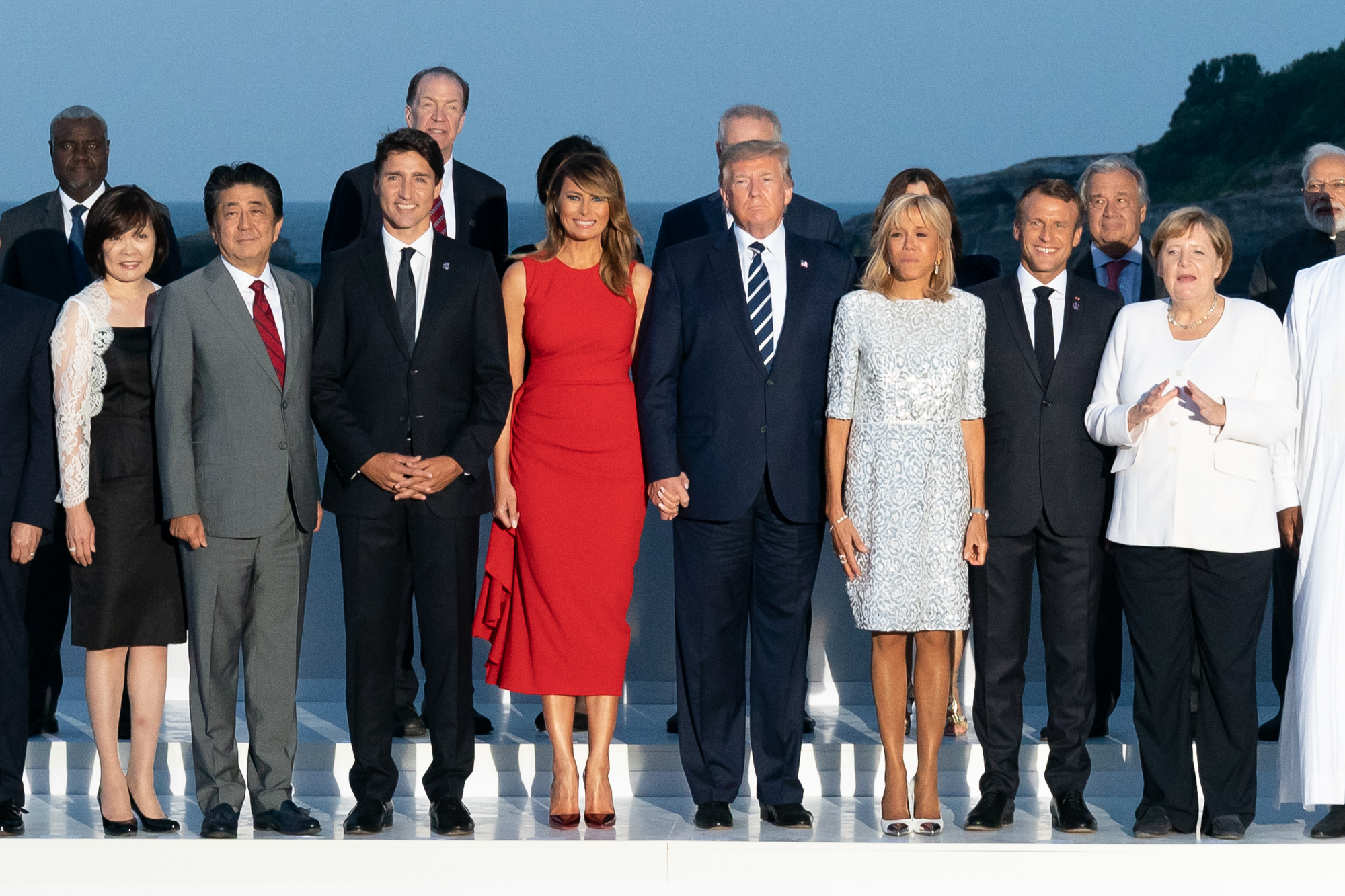
Trudeau with Emmanuel Macron, Shinzo Abe, Angela Merkel, Donald Trump, and other leaders at the 45th G7 summit in Biarritz, France

Trudeau enjoyed good relations with the like-minded United States President Barack Obama, despite Trudeau's support for the Keystone Pipeline which was rejected by the Democratic President. Trudeau's first foreign policy challenges included respecting his campaign promise to withdraw Canadian air support from the Syrian civil war and to welcome 25,000 Syrian war refugees.

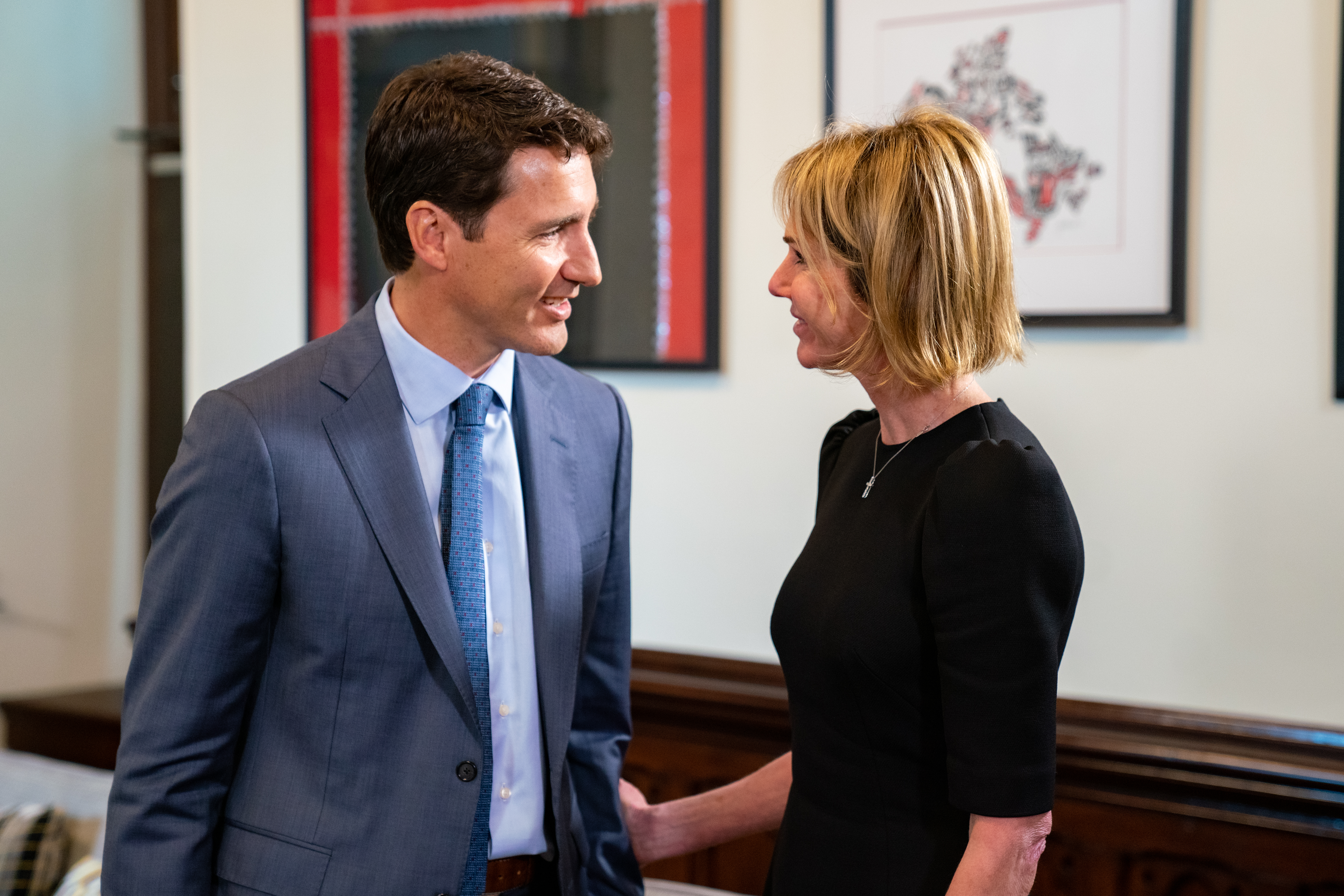
Prime Minister Justin Trudeau and US Ambassador to Canada Kelly Craft, 2019.

Trudeau had a much frostier relationship with Obama's successor, Donald Trump. The Trump administration forced the renegotiation of NAFTA to create the CUSMA (known as USMCA in the US), in which Canada made significant concessions in allowing increased imports of American milk, weakening Canada's dairy supply management system. Trump also implemented tariffs on Canadian steel and aluminum, to which Trudeau retaliated by imposing tariffs on American steel, aluminum and a variety of other American products. At the 2018 G7 summit, Trump called Trudeau "very dishonest and weak" in response to comments that Trudeau had made in a press conference, regarding Trump's tariffs. Trudeau again drew Trump's ire at the 2019 NATO summit when he was seen on video gossiping with his British and Dutch counterparts, Boris Johnson and Mark Rutte, as well as French president Emmanuel Macron, about a press conference that Trump had held earlier that day. Trump responded by calling Trudeau "two-faced" when asked by a reporter about the incident.

After Joe Biden was elected to succeed Trump in 2020, Trudeau was the first foreign leader to speak with Biden directly as president-elect. Trudeau was also the first leader to speak with Biden once he assumed office, and Biden's first formal bilateral meeting was with Trudeau, though it was held virtually due to the COVID-19 pandemic.

Canada's relationship with China has deteriorated under Trudeau's leadership, chiefly as a result of the Meng Wanzhou affair. Since Wanzhou's arrest at the Vancouver airport in December 2018, two Canadians (Michael Spavor and Michael Kovrig) have been held in custody in China. Both countries have requested the release of their nationals, which they see as political prisoners. Trudeau claims he does not have the authority to free Wanzhou, as his policy is to respect Canada's extradition treaty with the United States.

In a similar fashion, Canada's relationship with Saudi Arabia has deteriorated during Trudeau's premiership, as human rights groups called on Trudeau to stop selling military equipment to that country under a deal struck by his predecessor. In 2018, Saudi Arabia recalled its Canadian ambassador and froze trade with the country after Canada had called on the Saudis to release opposition blogger Raif Badawi. However, in 2019, Canada doubled its weapons sales to Saudi Arabia, despite a "moratorium on export permits following the killing of the Saudi journalist Jamal Khashoggi and mounting civilian deaths from the Saudi Arabian-led intervention in Yemen."

India's intelligence agencies, Research and Analysis Wing (RAW) and the Indian Intelligence Bureau, have been accused of trying to "covertly influence" Canadian politicians into supporting the Indian interests. According to the Norman Paterson School of International Affairs expert, "To my mind, this is one of the first public examples of evidence of clandestine foreign influence targeted at Canadian politicians."

In 2020, Canada lost its bid to join the United Nations Security Council. This was the second time Canada failed in an attempt to join the Security Council, the first time being in 2009 under Trudeau's predecessor Stephen Harper.

== See also ==
- Global Affairs Canada, current name for the department handling foreign affairs
  - Minister of Foreign Affairs (Canada)
  - Canada–China relations
  - Canada–France relations
  - Canada–Germany relations
  - Canada–Russia relations
  - Canada–United Kingdom relations
  - Canada–United States relations
- Military history of Canada
  - Military history of Canada during World War I
  - Canada in World War II
- List of Canadian peacekeeping missions
- Notable Canadian diplomats
  - Robert Borden
  - Hugh Llewellyn Keenleyside
  - William Lyon Mackenzie King
  - Vincent Massey
  - Lester B. Pearson
  - Oscar D. Skelton
  - Pierre Trudeau
  - Hume Wrong
