= Frederick Blair =

Canadian immigration official (1874–1959)

Frederick Charles Blair, ISO (October 1874 – May 28, 1959) was the director of the Government of Canada's Immigration Branch of the Department of Mines and Resources from 1936 to 1943. Blair developed and rigorously enforced strict immigration policies based on race and is most remembered for his successful effort to keep Jewish refugees from Nazi Germany out of Canada during the 1930s and the war years that followed. Between 1933 and 1939, Blair's office allowed fewer than 5,000 Jews into Canada, in comparison to over 200,000 allowed into the United States, and 20,000 into Mexico. After the war, between 1945 and 1948, the Immigration Branch accepted only 8,000 Jewish Holocaust survivors. "That record is arguably the worst of all possible refugee-receiving states", wrote Abella and Troper. Blair's rigorous enforcement of antisemitic immigration policies sealed the fate of thousands of European Jews who would have escaped death had Canada not turned them away.

== Biography ==
Frederick Blair was born 1874 in Carlisle, Ontario, the son of Scottish parents. In 1903 he joined the Department of Agriculture and in 1905 he became an immigration officer. In 1924 he became assistant deputy minister of immigration and in 1936 became the director of the Immigration Branch. He was a church elder and a dedicated civil servant who oversaw every aspect of Canadian immigration. He ruled the Immigration Branch with an iron fist. "He was the single most difficult individual I have had to deal with. ... He was a holy terror", James Gibson, an official in the Department of External Affairs told Abella and Troper. Blair was antisemitic, as were many among the Canadian elite of the time. Though he couched his public statements and policies in generalized, protectionist language, Blair's letters and private conversations, quoted extensively in None Is Too Many, reveal his distaste for Jews.

Blair was the policy's architect and staunch champion for Canada's closed-door policy with the full support of the Liberal Party of Canada government of Prime Minister William Lyon Mackenzie King. In September 1938, in a letter to the prime minister, Blair wrote, "Pressure by Jewish people to get into Canada has never been greater than it is now, and I am glad to be able to add that, after 35 years of experience here, that it has never been so carefully controlled".

Representative of Blair's xenophobic and antisemitic "careful control" was Canada's refusal in June 1939 to allow the MS St. Louis, the so-called "Voyage of the Damned" to dock in Halifax with 907 Jewish emigrants aboard. After Canada's rejection (following refusals from Cuba and the United States), the St. Louis was forced to return to Europe where, according to the United States Holocaust Memorial Museum, 254 of the passengers perished at the hands of the Nazis. There is now an exhibit, entitled The Wheel of Conscience in the Canadian Museum of Immigration at Pier 21, Halifax Regional Municipality, Nova Scotia, as a reminder of that event.

In his 1941 annual report, Blair wrote "Canada, in accordance with generally accepted practice, places greater emphasis on race than upon citizenship". When he retired in 1943, Frederick Blair was named a Companion of the Imperial Service Order.

Blair died on May 28, 1959, at age 84.
