= List of Canadian diplomats =

== Canadian Heads of Posts Abroad from 1880 ==
=== A ===
- Adam, David
- Ahmad, Daniel
- Alexander, Christopher
- Allard, Hector
- Allard-Gomez, Stéphanie
- Amyot, Léopold Henri
- Anderson, Allan Cunningham
- Anderson, Admiral John R.
- Andrew, Arthur Julian
- Andreychuk, A. Raynell
- Andrigo, Robert
- Angell, David
- April, Serge
- Archibald, Ruth
- Armstrong, Dorothy Jane
- Arnould, Derek Clement
- Asselin, Pierre Léon Gérard

=== B ===
- Bailey, Mark
- Baillargeon, Claude
- Balloch, Howard
- Barban, Gaston
- Barker, James Rollins
- Barrette, Antonio
- Bartleman, James Karl
- Barton, William Hickson
- Bassett, Charles Philip
- Baudouin, Daniel Georges Marc
- Bauer, William Edward
- Beauchemin, Marie-Andrée
- Beaulieu, Paul André
- Beaulne, Joseph Charles Léonard Yvon
- Beck, Stefanie
- Bédard, Charles Michel (1924-2013)
- Beesley, John Alan
- Belcher, J.R.
- Bélec, Jacques
- Bell, John Peter
- Bell, Michael Dougall
- Bell, Michael Richard
- Bell, Roderick
- Bellemare, Edward Ritchie
- Belliveau, Richard
- Benson, Hon. Edgar J.
- Bergbusch, Eric John
- Berger, David
- Norman Berlis
- Marie Bernard-Meunier
- Bernier, Gilles
- Best, James Calbert
- Bezanson, Keith Arthur
- Bild, M. Fred
- Pat Binns
- Biolik, Anna
- Birkett, Charles Blair
- Bissett, James Byron
- Bissonnet, Alfred Pike
- Bissonnette, Pierre-André
- Black, Eldon Pattyson
- Blackwell, Adam
- Blake, Roy William
- Blanchette, Arthur Edward
- Blouin, Georges-Henri
- Bobiash, Donald
- Bobinski, Edward Lucien
- Boehm, Peter
- Jean-Pierre Bolduc
- Bones, Alan
- Charles Steven Booth
- Bouchard, Hon. Benoît
- Bouchard, Lucien
- Anne-Marie Bourcier
- Bow, Malcolm Norman
- Bower, Richard Plant
- Bowker, Alan
- Boyd, Alan Robb
- Philip Francis Brady
- Sean Brady
- Brault, Marc
- Briand, Denis
- Bridle, Paul Augustus
- Britton, James Clelland
- Broadbridge, Arthur Frederick
- Brodeur, Yves
- Brossard, Jacques Edmond
- Brown, Harry Leslie
- Brown, Kenneth Charles
- Browne, Dean John
- Browne, Dennis Brian
- Bruce, Geoffrey Franklin
- Bruce, Hon. Robert Randolph
- Bruchési, Jean
- Buckley-Jones, Martha Dilys
- Bugailiskis, Alexandra
- Glen Buick
- Marius Jean Bujold
- Bull, Roger Anthony
- Bull, William Frederick
- Burbridge, Kenneth Joseph
- Burchell, Charles Jost
- Burney, Derek Hudson
- Bursey, Morley Byron
- Butler, Esmond Unwin

=== C ===
- Joseph Alphonse Léo Cadieux
- Marcel Cadieux
- Michel Cadieux
- Michael Calcott
- Perry Calderwood
- Cameron, Robert Parke
- Arthur Grant Campbell
- Donald Wilfred Campbell
- Gerald K. Campbell
- Peter George Raoul Campbell
- Campbell, Ross
- Campeau, Arthur
- Cappe, Mel
- Careau, Michel Antonin
- Carin, Barry
- Caron, Joseph
- Carruthers, Clive Alexander
- Carter, Harry Havilland
- Carter, Thomas Lemesurier (-2005)
- Cartwright, Susan M.W.
- Cavell, Reginald George
- Chapdelaine, Joseph Marc Antoine Jean
- Charland, Claude Talbot
- Margaret Anne Charles
- Pierre Edgar Joseph Charpentier
- Charpentier, Wilfrid Joseph Georges
- Châtillon, Claude Charles-Edouard
- Cheney, Donald Harry
- Chevrier, Hon. Lionel
- Chipman, Warwick Fielding
- Chistoff, Oleg Alec
- Choquette, Robert
- Chowdhury, Sanjeev
- Chrétien, Raymond A.J.
- Christie, Keith
- Christie, Loring Cheney
- Clark, Frank Borden
- Clark, Graeme C.
- Clark, Ian C.
- Clark, Lorne Sheldon
- Clark, Merrill G.
- Clark, Robert G.
- Clark, Robert Wilfred
- Clark, Robert William
- Clarke, William L.
- Clement, Sherine W
- Cleveland, John Harrison
- Cole, Douglas Seaman
- Coleman, Ephraim Herbert
- Colfer, Terence
- Collacott, David Martin
- Collett, Wilmer James
- Collette, Robert
- Collin, Paul-André
- Collins, David
- Collins, Ralph Edgar
- Comeau, Denis
- Cook, Geoffrey Cassels
- Cook, James Murray
- Cook, Kenneth Murray
- Cooper, James Edward
- Cooper, Percy Stewart
- Copithorne, Maurice D.
- Cornett, Donald Macalister
- Cosgrave, Col. Lawrence Moore
- Côté, Ernest Adolphe
- Côté, Joseph Jean Martial
- Couillard, Joseph Louis Eugène
- Court, Charles
- Couvrette, Joseph Gilles André
- Cousineau, Jacques Charles Joseph
- Cowan, Hector
- Cox, Gordon Edwin
- Crean, Gordon Gale
- Crête, Jacques
- Croft, Carman Millward
- Cruden, Heather
- Culham, Allan
- Cullen, Thomas George
- Cupples, Colleen Leora
- Curling, Alvin

=== D ===
- Louis-Robert Daigle
- Matthew Robert Macgowan Dale
- Abina Dann
- Russell H. Davidson
- Davis, Brian
- Chester Alvin Davis
- Davis, Hon. Thomas Clayton
- Stephen C. de Boer
- John G.D. de Chastelain
- Michel de Goumois
- Ferry de Kerckhove
- Louis de Lorimier
- Michel de Salaberry
- Gitane De Silva
- Délisle, Jean-Louis
- Delouya, Ariel
- Delvoie, Louis André
- Delworth, William Thomas
- Demers, Clovis
- Demers, Jacques
- Denault, Jacques D.E.
- Déry, Jean-Marie Gaétan
- des Rivières, Geneviève
- De Silva, Gitane
- Desjardins, Robert
- Desloges, Christine
- Després, Arsène A.
- Désy, Jean
- Deyell, John
- Dickenson, Lawrence T.
- Dier, Ormond Wilson
- Dingledine, Paul S.
- Adèle Dion
- Donald King Doherty
- Donaghy, John
- Donohue, Laughton
- Doré, Victor
- Dorrett, Reginald Hardy
- Dougan, John Alpine
- Doyle, Anne-Marie
- Drake, Earl Gordon
- Drapeau, Jean
- Drew, Hon. George Alexander
- Dubé, Roxanne
- Dubois, Andrée
- Dubois, Paul
- Duder, Rudolf
- Dudoit, Alain
- Duguay, Gilles Horace J.
- Duhamel, Roger
- Dumas, Pierre
- Dupuis, Jacques Jean Couillard
- Dupuy, Michel
- Dupuy, Pierre
- Durand, Paul D.
- Dussault, Bernard
- Dussault, Martin
- Duval, Jean-Marc
- Michel Duval
- William A. Dymond

=== E ===
- Fredrick S. Eaton
- Christopher Campbell Eberts
- Verona Edelstein
- Edmonds, Robert Bradford
- Leonard J. Edwards
- Edwards, Lucie
- Elliott, Colin Fraser
- Elliott, Robert L.
- Entwistle, Mark
- Erichson-Brown, John Price
- Etheridge, Nicholas
- Eyton, Anthony Tudor
- Elliott, James Angus

=== F ===
- Fabre, Hon. Hector
- Marc Faguy
- Fairweather, William M.M.
- Feaver, Herbert Frederick Brooks-Hill
- Ferguson, Hon. George Howard
- Ferguson, Ian
- Filleul, Francis Miles
- Fiorita, D.M.
- Fogerty, Charles Douglass
- Ford, Robert Arthur Douglass
- Fortier, d'Iberville
- Fortier, L. Yves
- Fortier, Patricia
- Fortin, Louise
- Fournier, Jean T.
- Fowler, Robert
- Fox, James
- Francis, Hon. Cyril Lloyd
- Francis, James Ross
- Fraser, Derek
- Fraser, Hon. John Allen
- Fraser, John MacLeod
- Fraser, Scott
- Frazer, Paul D.
- Fréchette, Louise
- Freifeld, Sidney Allan
- Frenette, Réjean
- Friedlaender, Lorenz
- Frith, Hon. Royce
- Frost, Evan Rimmer Clavell
- Fulford, Dwight Wilder

=== G ===
- Gagliano, Hon. Alfonso
- Gagnon, Jean-Louis
- Yves Gagnon
- Bernard Arthur Gagosz
- Charles Reid Gallow
- Galt, Hon. Sir Alexander Tilloch
- Garceau, Pierre Robert
- Garland, Edward Joseph
- Garneau, René
- Gaudefroy, Henri
- Gauvin, Michel
- Gauvreau, Émile
- Gayner, Robert Harold
- Gayowsky, Nestor E.
- George, James
- Gervais-Vidricaire, Marie
- Gherson, A. Randolph A.
- Gibson, John Edward Guy
- Gignac, Jacques Gilles Bruno
- Giguère, Pierre
- Gilbert, Roger Paul
- Gill, Evan William Thistle
- Gilmour, Eric Herbert
- Girard, Raphaël
- Giroux, Bernard
- Glasgow, Laurette
- Glass, Lester Smith
- Glover, Clive Edward
- Jack F. Godsell
- Goldschlag, Klaus
- Gooch, Stanley Edward
- Goodleaf, Dan E.
- Gordon, Sir Charles Blair
- Gorham, Richard Vessot
- Gotlieb, Allan Ezra
- Goulet, Roland
- Gourdeau, Henri
- Graham, Arnold Kingsley
- Graham, Janet
- Graham, John Ware
- Grande, Campbell
- Grande, George Kinnear
- Grant, Stewart T.
- Green, Graham
- Greene, Kenneth Alfred
- Gregg, Brig. the Hon. Milton Fowler
- Gregory, Fredericka
- Grenier, Raoul Jean
- Grenon, Jean-Yves
- Grey, Saul
- Grinius, Marius
- Grondin, Gilles
- Guay, Louis
- Gusen, William
- Guy, Henry W.

=== H ===
- John Gaylard Hadwen
- Robert Hage
- Ingrid Marianne Hall
- Halpin, Ronald
- Halstead, John Gelder Horler
- Louis Hamel
- Hammond, Thomas Charles
- Hammond, Wayne N.
- Hampson, Harold George
- Hancock, Peter Julian Arthur
- Hanson, Samuel
- Hardy, Christian
- Hardy, Joseph Evremond Ghislain
- Hare, Ewan Nigel
- Harman, Gary Richard
- Harper, Susan
- Harrington, John Maurice
- James Gordon Harris
- Lloyd Harris
- Albert Frederick Hart
- Hay, Harry Stewart
- Haynal, George
- Hearn, Godfrey Lewis
- Heasman, George Robert Cawdron
- Hébert, Charles Pierre
- Hébert, Ernest
- Heeney, Arnold Danford Patrick
- Heeney, Stephen
- Heinbecker, Paul
- Herran-Lima, José
- Herridge, Maj. the Hon. William Duncan
- Hewlett-Jobes, Kathryn
- Hicks, Arthur John
- Hicks, Douglas Barcham
- Higginbotham, John P.
- Higham, Kenneth Robert
- Hill, James
- Hillman, Kirsten
- Himelfarb, Alexander
- Phillipe Hirsch
- Hobson, Daniel Edward
- Ron Hoffmann
- Holmes, John T.
- Holmes, John Wendell
- Hooper, Cleeve Francis Wilfrid
- Hooton, Frank Geoffrey
- Hornby, Ross
- Houde, Joseph François Xavier
- Hradecky, Sara
- Huber, Margaret
- Hubert, Jean-Paul
- Hughes, Gerald Francis George
- Hunt, Paul
- Hurley, James Joseph
- Hurtubise, Suzanne
- Hutchings, David
- Hutton, David
- Hyndman, James Edward
- Hynes, Ross

=== I ===
- Ignatieff, George
- Bissett Irwin
- John Arnold Irwin
- Irwin, Rodney
- Irwin, Ron
- Irwin, William Arthur

=== J ===
- Frank T. Jackman
- Jackson, Robert David
- George T. Jacoby
- Leslie Alexander Keir James
- Jamieson, Hon. Donald Campbell
- Jarvis, William Esmond
- Jay, Raymond Harry
- Jenkins, William John
- Jennings, Peter Rowley
- Jobin, Stéphane
- Johansen, Karl
- Johnson, David Moffat
- Johnson, Irene Elizabeth
- Johnston, Peter Arthur Edward
- Johnstone, Robert
- Jones, Terence Stanford Ellis
- Jones, William
- Joubert, Pierre
- Joyce, Robert K.
- Juneau, Jean-Pierre
- Jutzi, Bruce

=== K ===
- Norbert Kalisch
- Karsgaard, David Andrew
- Kearney, John Doherty
- Keenleyside, Hugh Llewellyn
- Kelly, John Hall
- Kergin, Michael F.
- Kidd, George Pirkis
- Kilpatrick, Robert Allen
- Kingsley, Denis
- Kinsman, Jeremy K.B.
- Kirkwood, Kenneth Porter
- John Kneale
- Richard Kohler
- Kutz, Gwyneth

=== L ===
- Laberge, Paul-Eugène
- Laflèche, Maj.-Gen. the Hon. Léo Richer
- Laguë, Mario
- Lalande, Joseph Ernest Gilles
- Lalani, Arif
- Lambert, Garrett Christopher Michael
- Lambert, James
- Lamontagne, Yves
- Lamoureux, Hon. Lucien
- Langan-Torell, Patricia
- Langille, Gilbert Craig
- Langley, James Coningsby
- Lapointe, Christian
- Lapointe, Paul André
- Lapointe, Paul-Henri
- Laporte, Suzanne
- Larkin, Hon. Peter Charles
- Latour, Cécile
- Latulippe, Alain
- Lau, Paul S.H.
- Laughton, David Benson
- Laureys, Jean François Léon Henri
- Laurin, Gilbert
- Laverdure, Claude
- Lavertu, Gaétan
- Lavigne, Joseph Walter Lorne Hunter
- Lavoie, Jean-Pierre
- Leach, James Darrell
- Leahy, Anne
- Lecoq, Richard
- Lederman, Lawrence
- Lee, Edward Graham
- Lefebvre, Jean-Pierre
- Legault, Léonard Hilarion Joseph
- Léger, Jules
- Léger, Louise
- Leir, Michael
- Lemieux, Hubert Edmond
- Lemieux, Marc C.
- Lessard, Gabriel-Marie Frédéric
- Lett, Brig. Sherwood
- Lever, Allan Norman
- Lévesque, Michèle
- Levin, Matthew
- Bruce Alexander Levy
- Lewis, Stephen H.
- Licari, Wilfrid-Guy
- Licharson, John Andrew
- Lipman, Ted
- Livermore, Daniel
- Livingston, Frederick Griffiths
- Lloyd, Peter
- Logie, Robert R.M.
- Longmuir, D. Gordon
- Loranger, Julie
- Lortie, Marc Robert
- Lotto, Victor George
- Lundy, Anne Christine

=== M ===
- Elizabeth Pauline MacCallum
- MacDermot, Terence William Leighton
- Craig Thomas MacDonald
- MacDonald, Hon. David S.H.
- Macdonald, Hon. Donald Stovel
- Macdonald, James Scott
- MacDonald, Melvyn
- MacDonald, Thomas
- Macdonnell, Ronald Macalister
- Mace, Michael T.
- Macgillivray, John Charles
- MacKay, Robert Alexander
- MacKinnon, Philip
- MacLachlan, John R.
- MacLaren, Hon. Roy
- MacLean, Ronald Stuart
- MacLellan, Keith William
- Macpherson, Marion Adams
- Maddick, Harold Morton
- Magann, George Loranger
- Magee, William Edward
- Mahoney, Merchant M.
- Mailhot, Normand
- Main, J.R.K.
- Malone, David
- Malone, Joseph Anthony
- Malone, Thomas Paul
- Mank, Randolph
- Richard Mann
- Marchand, Daniel
- Marchand, de Montigny
- Marchand, Louise R.
- Marchi, Hon. Sergio
- Marcoux, Serge
- Marler, Hon. Sir Herbert Meredith
- Marr, Thomas
- Marsden-Dole, Patricia M.
- Marshall, Charles Jordan
- Martin, Hon. Joseph James Guillaume Paul
- Massey, Hon. Vincent
- Massip, Marie Isabelle
- Matheson, Angus James
- Gilles Mathieu
- Mathys, François Antoine
- Matthews, Wilmot Donald
- Mawhinney, Barry Michael
- Maybee, John Ryerson
- Mayhew, Hon. Robert Wellington
- Mayrand, Léon
- McAlister, Andrew
- McArthur, Archibald Duncan
- McAskie, Carolyn M.
- McCallion, Kathryn Elizabeth
- McCardell, Sandra
- McCardle, James Joachim
- McCarthy, Hon. Leighton
- McCloskey, Jean
- McCordick, John Alexander
- McCoy, Susan
- McCracken, David Stewart
- McCue, Douglas
- McCullough, Wilfrid Bertram
- MacDermot, Terrence William Leighton
- McDermott, Dennis
- McDougall, Pamela Ann
- McDougall, Robert
- McDowall, Stuart B.
- McGaughey, Charles Eustace
- McGill, Allan Sydney
- McGreer, Edgar D'Arcy
- McIlwraith, Kenneth Douglas
- McInnes, Graham Campbell
- McKellar, Peter
- McKenna, Frank J.
- McKinney, James Russell
- McLaine, Alan Pittman
- McLane, Paul Vernon
- McLaren, Robert Wallace
- McLennan, Donald P.
- McMaster, Donald
- McMurtry, Hon. Roland Roy
- McNaughton, Gen. Andrew George Latta
- McNee, John A.
- McPhail, Donald Sutherland
- McQueen, Jennifer R.
- McRae, Robert
- Meagher, Blanche Margaret
- Meech, Frederick Martyn
- Menzies, Arthur Redpath
- Meunier, Marie-Bernard
- Meyer, Paul
- Michener, Hon. Daniel Roland
- Middleton, Robert Morrice
- Midwinter, James Robert
- Miller, David Miles
- Mitchell, Robert Henry Graham
- Moher, Mark
- Molgat, Daniel Albert Bernard
- Molloy, Michael J.
- Montgomery, William Harp
- Moore, Victor Campbell
- Moran, Herbert Owen
- Morantz, Aubrey Lawrence
- Moreau, Martine
- Morin, Jean
- Morin, Marie-Lucie
- Mosser, Mary
- Mukhopadhyay, Audri
- Mullin, Scott J.
- Mulroney, David
- Mundy, John
- Munro, Donald Wallace
- Murison, Michael William
- Murray, Rosaline

=== N ===
- Jean Nadeau
- John Howard Nelson
- Theodore Francis Moorhouse Newton
- Noble, John
- Noble, Kenneth Frederick
- Noble, Robert
- Noiseux, Jacques
- Norman, Egerton Herbert
- Norman, Henry Gordon
- Normandin, Henri-Paul
- Northgrave, Brian
- Nutt, Jim Sutcliffe
- Nutting, Sinclair Holmes

=== O ===
- Brian Oak
- Odlum, Maj.-Gen. Victor Wentworth
- Olivier, William George Marcel
- O'Neill, Jacqueline
- Ouellette, J. André
- Ouimet, Louise

=== P ===
- Pacaud, Lucien Turcotte
- Martial Pagé
- Frederic Herbert Palmer
- Panneton, Philippe
- Pardy, Henry G.
- Parent, Hon. Gilbert
- Parisot, Patrick
- Patterson, George Sutton
- Payne, Julian H.
- Pearson, Geoffrey A.H.
- Pearson, Lester Bowles
- Peck, Robert
- Pedersen, Robert E.
- Peel, Hugh David
- Pelletier, Hon. Gérard
- Perley, Hon. Sir George Halsey
- Perrault, Michel
- Perron, Arthur C.
- Perron, Marc
- Pflanz, Benno Theodore
- Phillips, Michael B.
- Picard, Bruno
- Picard, Louis Phillippe
- Pick, Alfred John
- Pierce, Sydney David
- Pillarella, Franco
- Pinnacle, Trevor John
- Poisson, Louis
- Poole, J. Christopher
- Pope, Lt.-Gen. Maurice Arthur
- Pope, Thomas Maurice du Monceau
- Pottie, Donica
- Potvin, André Réal
- Poulin, Claire
- Pouliot, François P.
- Power, Noble Edward Charles
- Preston, David
- Puxley, Evelyn

=== R ===
- Rae, Saul Forbes
- Rankin, Bruce Irving
- Gerald Anthony Rau
- Raymond, Valerie
- Paul Reading
- David Chalmer Reece
- Neil Reeder
- Reid, Escott Meredith
- Renaud, Paul Émile
- Rettie, Edward Rose
- Reynolds, Ralph Edward
- Rezek, Gustav Gad
- Richardson, Barbara
- Riddell, Gordon George
- Riddell, Robert Gerald
- Riddell, Walter Alexander
- Rioux, Georges
- Rishchynski, Guillermo
- Ritchie, Albert Edgar
- Ritchie, Charles Stewart Almon
- Rive, Alfred
- Robbins, John Everett
- Roberts, James Alan
- Roberts, Peter McLaren
- Robertson, Angus Waldron John
- Robertson, Norman Alexander
- Robinson, Andrew
- Robinson, John
- Rochon, Robert J.
- Rock, Allan
- Roger, Allan Barclay
- Rogers, Evan Benjamin
- Rogers, Robert Louis
- Rohringer, Leslie Andrew Michael
- Ronning, Chester Alvin
- Rose, John David Logan
- Ross, Andrew Donald
- Ross, C. William
- Rousseau, Charles Odilon Roger
- Rousseau, Hugues
- Roy, Isabelle
- Roy, Jacques Silva
- Roy, Joseph Raymond
- Roy, Lionel Victor Joseph
- Roy, Michel
- Roy, Hon. Philippe
- Rufelds, Carl Ernest
- Russel, Colin

=== S ===
- Jean-Guy Joseph Bernard Saint-Martin
- Claude Jean Saint-Pierre
- Haig Edouard Sarafian
- Jules Savaria
- John Pontoppidan Schioler
- John Schram
- Edward Richard Schreyer
- Brian Schumacher
- Schwarzmann, Maurice
- Schemmer, Darren
- Schwenger, Carl
- Scott, Harry Albert
- Scott, Jon J.
- Scott, Seaman Morley
- Scrimshaw, Sandelle D.
- Seaborn, James Blair
- Serafini, Shirley
- Seymour, George Wesley
- Shaikh, Zaib
- Shannon, George James
- Shannon, Gerald Edward
- Sheehan, Terrence Bernard
- Shenstone, Michael
- Sherwood, Arthur Percy
- Shortliffe, Glen Scott
- Sigurdson, Konrad
- Sigvaldason, John Peter
- Simard, André S.
- Simard, Jacques T.
- Simard-Andujar, Hélène
- Simon, Mary
- Sinclair, Donald
- Jill Sinclair
- Sinclair, William E.
- Singleton, Howard Barham
- Sirrs, Robert Douglas
- Skinner, Gerald R.
- Skok, Margaret
- Small, Albert Douglas
- Small, Charles John
- Small, Michael
- Smith, Arnold Cantwell
- Smith, Donald W.
- Smith, Gary J.
- Smith, Gordon Scott
- Smith, Lawrence Austin Hayne
- Smith, Robert Guy Carrington
- Smith, Baron Strathcona and Mount Royal, Hon. Sir Donald Alexander
- Snider, Dennis
- Somerville, Philip
- Southam, Gordon Hamilton
- Spector, Norman
- Sproule, David
- St. Jacques, Guy
- Stanford, Joseph Stephen
- Stansfield, David
- Starnes, John Kennett
- Steers, Barry Connell
- Steidle, Doreen
- Stephens, Llewellyn Aikins Douglas
- Stephenson, Donald
- Stewart, Allan
- Stewart, Gavin Hugh
- Stiles, John Alexander
- Stiles, Nancy M.
- Stirk, Jillian
- Stockwell, David M.
- Stone, James Howard
- Stone, Thomas Archibald
- Stone, William Frank
- Stovel, Jeanette
- Strauss, Howard
- Strong, James Alexander
- Sullivan, Alan William
- Summers, David
- Summers, George Bernard
- Sunquist, Kenneth
- Sutherland, Peter
- Swords, Colleen
- Jon-Michel Sullivan
- Sylvain, Carmen

=== T ===
- Tait, Richard Marcus
- Tanguay, J. Fernand
- Tanguay, Pierre
- Taylor, James Hutchings
- Taylor, Kenneth D.
- Lewis James Taylor
- Teakles, John McLaurin
- Michael Charles Temple
- Richard Têtu
- Paul Arthur Théberge
- Theodore, Nadia
- Denis Thibault
- Thibault, J.E.
- John Maldwyn Turner Thomas
- Christopher Thomson
- Robert Key Thomson
- John Timmerman
- Touchette, Jean-Marcel
- Tovell, Freeman Massey
- Towe, Peter Milburn
- Tregaskes, Stuart Gerald
- Treleaven, John
- Tremblay, Paul
- Tremblay, Pierre
- Trottier, Pierre L.
- Tupper, Bart., Hon. Sir Charles Hibbert
- Turcotte, Edmond
- Turgeon, Hon. William Ferdinand Alphonse
- Turner, Vernon George

=== V ===
- Vaillancourt, Joseph Jacques Janvier Émile
- Valaskakis, Kimon
- George Douglas Valentine
- Claudio Valle
- Duane van Beselaere
- Clarence Joseph Van Tighem
- Mary Elizabeth Vandenhoff
- Robert Vanderloo
- George Philias Vanier
- Venner, Gordon E.
- Vincent, Anthony
- Virtue, Alan
- Viveash, David
- von Finckenstein, Ottfried
- von Nostitz, Manfred Gustav

=== W ===
- Wadds, Jean Casselman
- Wade, Simon
- Wadsworth, Michael A.
- Wainman-Wood, Thomas Blake Burrill
- Wales, Robert L.
- Walker, Peter F.
- Wall, James
- Wang, Erik Benkestock
- Warden, William Thomas
- Wardroper, Wilfrid Kenneth
- Warren, Jack Hamilton
- Watkins, John Benjamin Clark
- Webster, Clifford Johnston
- Weekes, John
- Welsh, Michael
- Wershof, Max Hirsch
- Westdal, Christopher William
- Weynerowski, Witold Maciej
- Wheeler, Stewart
- Whiting, Shelley
- Whittleton, Jack Alexander
- Wielgosz, Renata
- Wilgress, Leolyn Dana
- Williams, Bruce MacGillivray (-2005)
- Williams, Timothy Angus
- Williamson, Kenneth Bryce
- Wilson, Gardiner
- Wilson, Michael
- Winfield, David John Sydney
- Wood, Francis Ian
- Wood, William McKenzie
- Woodford, Edward Henry
- Woodsworth, Charles James
- Woolham, Robert Gordon
- Wright, Arthur Robert
- Wright, David
- Wright, James R.
- Wright, Robert A.
- Wright, Robert G.
- Wrong, Humphrey Hume

=== Y ===
- Yalden, Maxwell Freeman

=== Z ===
- Zawisza, John M.A.
- Zukowsky, Janet P.
