= List of ambassadors of Canada to Belarus =

Ambassador of Canada to Belarus
- Seat: Embassy of Canada, Warsaw
- Nominator: Prime Minister of Canada
- Appointer: Governor General of Canada
- Term length: At His Majesty's pleasure
- Inaugural holder: Michael Richard Bell
- Formation: May 21, 1992

The Ambassador of Canada to Belarus is the official representative of the Canadian government to the government of Belarus. The official title for the ambassador is Ambassador Extraordinary and Plenipotentiary of Canada to the Republic of Belarus. There is no current Canadian government office in Belarus.

== History of diplomatic relations ==
Diplomatic relations between Canada and Belarus was established on May 21, 1992. Michael Richard Bell was appointed as Canada's first Ambassador in Belarus in 1992.

== List of heads of mission ==
No.	Name	Term of office			Career	Prime Minister nominated by	Ref.
No.	Name	Start date	PoC.	End date	Career	Prime Minister nominated by	Ref.
1	Michael Richard Bell	1992		December 17, 1992	Career	Brian Mulroney (1984–1993)	
2	Jeremy K.B. Kinsman	November 25, 1994		1996	Career	Jean Chrétien (1993–2003)	
3	Anne Leahy	September 11, 1996	February 13, 1997	1999	Career	Jean Chrétien (1993–2003)	
4	Donald P. McLennan	August 11, 1999	December 1, 1999		Career	Jean Chrétien (1993–2003)	
5	Ralph Lysyshyn	October 31, 2002	March 12, 2003		Career	Jean Chrétien (1993–2003)	
6	Stephen de Boer	December 5, 2016	December 13, 2016	August 2017	Career	Justin Trudeau (2015–2025)	
7	Leslie Scanlon	October 25, 2018	January 21, 2019		Career	Justin Trudeau (2015–2025)	
