= List of ambassadors of Canada to Armenia =

Ambassador of Canada to Armenia
- Incumbent; Julie Crowley since 2026
- Seat: Consulate of Canada, Yerevan
- Nominator: Prime Minister of Canada
- Appointer: Governor General of Canada
- Term length: At His Majesty's pleasure
- Inaugural holder: Michael Richard Bell
- Formation: May 1, 1980

The ambassador of Canada to Armenia is the official representative of the Canadian government to the government of Armenia. The official title for the ambassador is Ambassador Extraordinary and Plenipotentiary of Canada to the Republic of Armenia. The current Canadian ambassador is Julie Crowley who was appointed on the advice of Prime Minister Mark Carney on July 31, 2026.

The Consulate of Canada is located at 129 Armenakyan Str., 0047 Yerevan, Armenia.

== History of diplomatic relations ==
Diplomatic relations between Canada and Armenia was established on January 31, 1992. Michael Richard Bell was appointed as Canada's first Ambassador to Armenia in 1992. Canada official opened a consulate in Armenia on December 15, 2022, in recognition of the 30th anniversary of the establishment of diplomatic relations between the two countries.

== List of ambassadors ==
No.	Name	Term of office			Career	Prime Minister nominated by	Ref.
No.	Name	Start Date	PoC.	End Date	Career	Prime Minister nominated by	Ref.
1	Michael Richard Bell	1992		December 17, 1992	Career	Brian Mulroney (1984–1993)	
2	Jeremy K.B. Kinsman	November 25, 1994		1996	Career	Jean Chrétien (1993–2003)	
3	Anne Leahy	September 11, 1996	March 24, 1997	1999	Career	Jean Chrétien (1993–2003)	
4	Rodney Irwin	August 11, 1999	April 4, 2000	August 1, 2003	Career	Jean Chrétien (1993–2003)	
5	Chris Westdal	September 15, 2003	December 13, 2003	July 28, 2006	Career	Jean Chrétien (1993–2003)	
6	Ralph Lysyshyn	June 14, 2006	November 21, 2006	August 21, 2010	Career	Stephen Harper (2006–2015)	
7	John Sloan	August 25, 2010	November 2, 2010	September 20, 2013	Career	Stephen Harper (2006–2015)	
8	John Kur	August 16, 2013	January 24, 2014	August 18, 2018	Career	Stephen Harper (2006–2015)	
9	Alison LeClaire	November 19, 2019	November 17, 2020	November 30, 2023	Career	Justin Trudeau (2015–2025)	
10	Andrew Turner	September 20, 2023	October 20, 2023	August 24, 2026	Career	Justin Trudeau (2015–2025)	
11	Julie Crowley	July 31, 2026	October 7, 2026		Career	Mark Carney (2025–Present)	
