= List of ambassadors of Canada to Algeria =

Ambassador of Canada to Algeria
- Incumbent; Vacant
- Seat: Embassy of Canada, Algiers
- Nominator: Prime Minister of Canada
- Appointer: Governor General of Canada
- Term length: At His Majesty's pleasure
- Inaugural holder: Ross Campbell
- Formation: October 18, 1965

The ambassador of Canada to Algeria is the official representative of the Canadian government to the government of Algeria. The official title for the ambassador is Ambassador Extraordinary and Plenipotentiary of Canada to the People’s Democratic Republic of Algeria. The current Canadian ambassador is Michael Callan who was appointed on the advice of Prime Minister Justin Trudeau on December 20, 2021.

The Embassy of Canada is located at 18 Mustapha Khalef Street, Ben Aknoun, Algiers, Algeria.

== History of diplomatic relations ==
Diplomatic relations between Canada and Algeria was established on July 3, 1962. Ross Campbell was appointed as Canada's first Ambassador to Yugoslavia, concurrently accredited as Ambassador to Algeria and resident in Yugoslavia on October 18, 1965. Canada's embassy was established in Yugoslavia in November 1965, and established an embassy in Algeria on November 26, 1971.

== List of Canadian ambassadors to Algeria ==
No.	Name	Term of office			Career	Prime Minister nominated by	Ref.
No.	Name	Start Date	PoC.	End Date	Career	Prime Minister nominated by	Ref.
1	Ross Campbell	October 18, 1965	November 12, 1965	February 10, 1967	Career	Lester B. Pearson (1963–1968)	
2	René Garneau	December 8, 1966	February 10, 1967	May 10, 1968	Career	Lester B. Pearson (1963–1968)	(Note: Mr. Garneau's appointment marked the change in residency of the Canadian Ambassador from Yugoslavia to Switzerland. Henceforth, the Ambassador to Switzerland was concurrently accredited as Ambassador to Algeria, resident in Switzerland.)
3	James Alan Roberts	October 31, 1968	February 21, 1969	November 26, 1971	Non-Career	Pierre Elliott Trudeau (1968–1979 & 1980–1984)	
4	Christian Hardy	July 8, 1971	November 26, 1971	August 13, 1973	Career	Pierre Elliott Trudeau (1968–1979 & 1980–1984)	(Note: An Embassy was established in Algeria in November 1971. Mr. Hardy became the first resident Ambassador to Algeria)
5	Robert L. Elliott	July 12, 1973	August 24, 1973	July 12, 1976	Career	Pierre Elliott Trudeau (1968–1979 & 1980–1984)	
6	Pierre Edgar Joseph Charpentier	September 8, 1976	October 27, 1976	July 5, 1978	Career	Pierre Elliott Trudeau (1968–1979 & 1980–1984)	
7	Joseph Raymond Roy	June 15, 1978	January 17, 1979	July 31, 1980	Career	Pierre Elliott Trudeau (1968–1979 & 1980–1984)	
8	Louis André Delvoie	July 10, 1980	October 22, 1980		Career	Pierre Elliott Trudeau (1968–1979 & 1980–1984)	
9	Paul-Eugène Laberge	September 22, 1982	August 22, 1982	August 1985	Career	Pierre Elliott Trudeau (1968–1979 & 1980–1984)	
10	François P. Pouliot	June 27, 1985	October 27, 1985	September 30, 1987	Career	Brian Mulroney (1984–1993)	
11	Gilles Mathieu	November 26, 1987	February 3, 1988	June 7, 1990	Career	Brian Mulroney (1984–1993)	
12	Marc C. Lemieux	September 12, 1990	October 30, 1990	August 12, 1993	Career	Brian Mulroney (1984–1993)	
13	Michel Perrault	December 15, 1993	November 29, 1993	April 28, 1995	Career	Jean Chrétien (1993–2003)	
14	Jacques Noiseux	May 3, 1995	July 30, 1995	August 25, 1997	Career	Jean Chrétien (1993–2003)	
15	Franco Pillarella	July 10, 1997			Career	Jean Chrétien (1993–2003)	
16	Richard Belliveau	July 26, 2000	November 28, 2000		Career	Jean Chrétien (1993–2003)	
17	Robert W. Peck	August 9, 2004			Career	Paul Martin (2003–2006)	
18	Patrick Parisot	December 21, 2007	January 26, 2008	September 2010	Career	Stephen Harper (2006–2015)	
19	Geneviève des Rivières	July 19, 2011	September 13, 2011		Career	Stephen Harper (2006–2015)	
20	Isabelle Roy	January 8, 2015	March 29, 2015	August 2017	Career	Stephen Harper (2006–2015)	
21	Patricia McCullagh	August 17, 2017	May 30, 2019	August 2019	Career	Justin Trudeau (2015–2025)	
22	Christopher Wilkie	October 21, 2019	December 2, 2019	December 2, 2019	Career	Justin Trudeau (2015–2025)	
23	Michael Callan	December 20, 2021	February 10, 2022	February 10, 2022	Career	Justin Trudeau (2015–2025)	
