= List of ambassadors of Canada to the European Union =

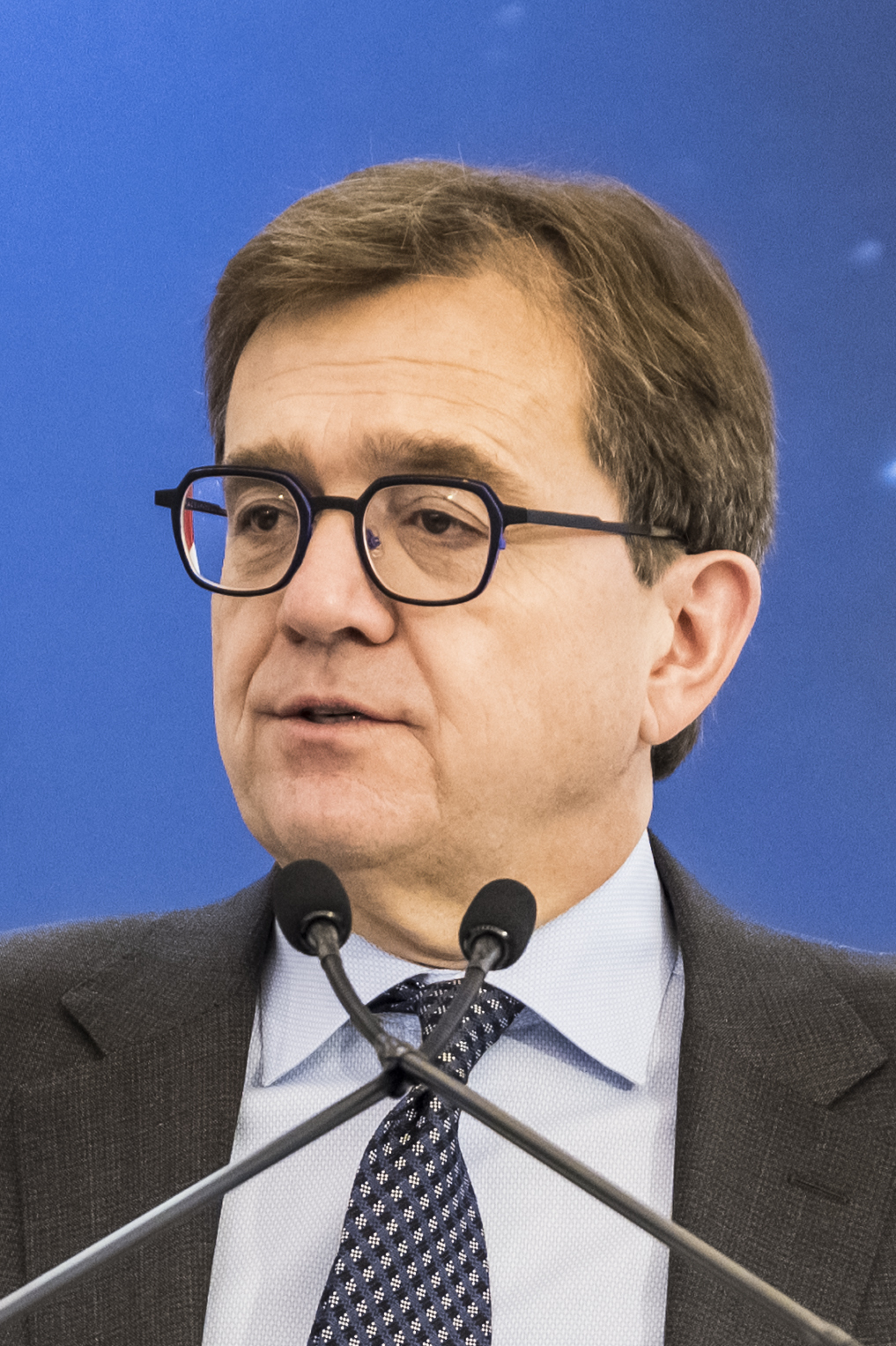
Jonathan Wilkinson has been the Canadian ambassador to the EU since June 22, 2026.

The ambassador of Canada to the European Union is the head of the Mission of Canada to the European Union, which represents Canada and its interests in the European Union.

== Description ==
With offices at Avenue des Arts 58 in Brussels, Belgium (like the Canadian embassy), the mission employs representatives from Global Affairs Canada, Agriculture and Agri-Food Canada, Immigration, Refugees and Citizenship Canada, the Canada Border Services Agency, the Canadian Food Inspection Agency and the Department of Justice.

It used to include the European Economic Community, the European Atomic Energy Community, and the European Coal and Steel Community. On December 29, 1959, Cabinet decided to seek the agreement of the three bodies to have Sydney David Pierce accredited to them at the ambassadorial level. Pierce was already Canada's Ambassador to Belgium.

== Ambassadors ==
List of Canadian ambassadors to the European Union with the rank and status of Head of Mission:

Ambassador	Start of term	End of term
Sydney David Pierce	March 17, 1960	October 31, 1965
Paul Tremblay	May 13, 1966	February 16, 1970
Randolph Gherson	February 17, 1970	January 28, 1971
James Coningsby Langley	December 10, 1970	June 28, 1975
Marcel Cadieux	March 27, 1975	September 8, 1978
Richard Marcus Tait	October 12, 1978	September 9, 1982
Jacques Gignac	September 22, 1982	-
Robert K. Joyce	November 15, 1985	-
Craig Thomas MacDonald	October 1986	-
Daniel Molgat	January 22, 1987	September 23, 1991
Gordon Scott Smith	1991	August 12, 1994
Jacques Roy	August 30, 1994	July 1996
Jean-Pierre Juneau	September 11, 1996	-
James Bartleman	July 26, 2000	-
Jeremy Kinsman	August 1, 2002	June 16, 2006
Ross Hornby	June 16, 2006	July 22, 2011
H. David Plunkett	July 22, 2011	August 14, 2015
Daniel J. Costello	August 14, 2015	
Christopher Cooter, Chargé d'affaires		
Ailish Campbell	November 30, 2020	September 1, 2025
Jonathan Wilkinson	June 22, 2026	present

== Special Envoys ==
Created by Prime Minister Justin Trudeau in 2017.

Ambassador	Start of term	End of term
Stéphane Dion	1 May 2017	1 October 2025
John Hannaford	1 October 2025	
