= Walter Riddell =

Walter Riddell may refer to:

- Walter Alexander Riddell, Canadian civil servant, diplomat, and academic
- Sir Walter Riddell, 12th Baronet, British academic
