= Brodeur =

Brodeur is a French-Canadian surname. Notable people with the surname include:

- Bernard Brodeur (born 1956), Canadian politician
- Christopher X. Brodeur, musician and cartoonist
- Denis Brodeur (1930–2013), Canadian photographer
- Francine Claire Brodeur, American illustrator and author
- Edmond Brodeur (1898–1988), Canadian politician
- Louis-Philippe Brodeur (1862–1924), Canadian politician and Supreme Court judge
- Martin Brodeur (born 1972), Canadian ice hockey player
- Mike Brodeur (born 1983), Canadian ice hockey player
- Mylène Brodeur (born 1987), Canadian figure skater
- Paul Brodeur (1931–2023), American author and science writer
- Richard Brodeur (born 1952), Canadian ice hockey player
- Yves Brodeur (born 1953), Canadian diplomat
