= Jacques Roy =

Jacques Roy is the name of:

- Jacques Roy (diplomat) (1934–2024), Canadian diplomat and ambassador
- Jacques Roy (mayor) (born 1970), American mayor of Alexandria, Louisiana
