= List of ambassadors of Canada to China =

Ambassador of Canada to the People's Republic of China
- Incumbent; Jennifer May since September 23, 2022
- Global Affairs Canada
- Reports to: Minister of Foreign Affairs
- Seat: Embassy of Canada, Beijing
- Appointer: Governor General of Canada
- Formation: November 5, 1942
- First holder: Thomas Clayton Davis

The ambassador of Canada to China is the official representative of the Canadian government to the government of China. The official title for the ambassador is Ambassador Extraordinary and Plenipotentiary of Canada to the People's Republic of China. The current Ambassador of Canada is Jennifer May who was appointed on the advice of Prime Minister Justin Trudeau on September 22, 2022.

The Embassy of Canada is located at 19 Dongzhimenwai Dajie, Chaoyang District, 100600 Beijing 100600, China.

== History of diplomatic relations ==
Canada was originally represented in China by the British ambassador, who looked after the interests of the entire British Empire and later the British Commonwealth. Canadian participation in World War II made it desirable to establish separate representation in China. Diplomatic relations between Canada and China were established on November 6, 1941, with the first ambassador, Victor Wentworth Odlum, appointed on the advice of Prime Minister W.L. Mackenzie King on November 5, 1942. A Canadian Embassy was opened in the temporary capital of Chongqing. The embassy was then moved to the permanent Nationalist capital of Nanjing in 1946.

The Canadian ambassador remained in Nanjing after Communist troops took the city on April 23, 1949. Canada then maintained diplomatic relations with Communist China at the chargé level from July 1949 to February 1951, when the Korean War made it impossible for diplomatic relations to continue. Canada chose not to post an ambassador to the Nationalist capital of Taipei, maintaining relations through the Nationalist Chinese ambassador in Ottawa.

Canada recognized the People's Republic of China as the sole legitimate government of China on October 13, 1970, and a Canadian Embassy was opened in Beijing on June 10, 1971. In 1986, the Canadian Trade Office in Taipei was opened for unofficial diplomatic ties with Taiwan.

Ronning, Collins, Small and Menzies (born in Zhangde, Henan) were Chinese born diplomats who possessed significant Chinese cultural knowledge, and in the case of Ronning, near-native language skills. Paynter, Mulroney and Saint-Jacques had served as diplomats to China prior to being appointed ambassador.

John Lawrence Paynter died in Vancouver 10 months into his posting while still serving as Canada's Ambassador to China.

== List of Canadian ambassadors to China ==
| No. | Name | Term of office | | | Career | Prime Minister nominated by | Ref. |
| No. | Name | Start Date | PoC. | End Date | Career | Prime Minister nominated by | Ref. |
|---|---|---|---|---|---|---|---|
| 1 | Victor Wentworth Odlum | November 5, 1942 | May 11, 1943 | October 4, 1946 | Career | W. L. Mackenzie King (1935-1948) | |
| - | George Sutton Patterson (Chargé d'Affaires) | October 4, 1946 | | March 1945 | Career | W. L. Mackenzie King (1935-1948) | |
| 2 | Thomas Clayton Davis | October 24, 1946 | May 21, 1947 | April 1, 1949 | Non-Career | W. L. Mackenzie King (1935-1948) | |
| - | Chester Alvin Ronning (Chargé d'Affaires) | April 1, 1949 | | February 26, 1951 | Career | Louis St. Laurent (1948-1957) | |
| - | John MacLeod Fraser (Chargé d'Affaires) | January 11, 1971 | | June 10, 1971 | Career | Pierre Elliott Trudeau (1968-1979) | |
| 3 | Ralph Edgar Collins | April 8, 1971 | June 10, 1971 | September 17, 1972 | Career | Pierre Elliott Trudeau (1968-1979) | |
| 4 | Charles John Small | June 8, 1972 | October 27, 1972 | October 8, 1976 | Career | Pierre Elliott Trudeau (1968-1979) | |
| 5 | Arthur Redpath Menzies | June 29, 1976 | November 3, 1976 | September 23, 1980 | Career | Pierre Elliott Trudeau (1968-1979) | |
| 6 | Michel Gauvin | September 12, 1980 | November 14, 1980 | | Career | Pierre Elliott Trudeau (1968-1979) | |
| 7 | Richard Vessot Gorham | May 31, 1984 | September 5, 1984 | 1987 | Career | Pierre Elliott Trudeau (1968-1979) | |
| 8 | Earl Gordon Drake | September 10, 1987 | October 16, 1987 | October 5, 1990 | Career | Brian Mulroney (1984-1993) | |
| 9 | M. Fred Bild | September 12, 1990 | October 11, 1990 | December 4, 1994 | Career | Brian Mulroney (1984-1993) | |
| 10 | John Lawrence Paynter | December 23, 1994 | | October 31, 1995 | Career | Jean Chrétien (1993-2003) | |
| 11 | Howard Balloch | February 13, 1996 | | | Career | Jean Chrétien (1993-2003) | |
| 12 | Colin Russell (Consul - General) | July 10, 1997 | | | Career | Jean Chrétien (1993-2003) | |
| 13 | Stewart Beck (Consul - General) | June 10, 1999 | | | Career | Jean Chrétien (1993-2003) | |
| 14 | Joseph Caron | July 16, 2001 | September 6, 2001 | July 28, 2005 | Career | Jean Chrétien (1993-2003) | |
| 15 | Robert G. Wright | August 19, 2005 | August 29, 2005 | June 2009 | Career | Paul Martin (2003-2006) | |
| 16 | Doreen Steidle (Consul - General) | July 4, 2008 | | | Career | Stephen Harper (2006-2015) | |
| 17 | David Mulroney | May 27, 2009 | August 28, 2009 | Summer 2012 | Career | Stephen Harper (2006-2015) | |
| 18 | James Ian Burchett (Consul - General) | March 20, 2012 | | | Career | Stephen Harper (2006-2015) | |
| 19 | Guy Saint-Jacques | September 24, 2012 | December 17, 2012 | October 2016 | Career | Stephen Harper (2006-2015) | |
| 20 | John McCallum | March 7, 2017 | March 17, 2017 | January 26, 2019 | Non-Career | Justin Trudeau (2015-2025) | |
| – | Jim Nickel | January 27, 2019 | | September 4, 2019 | Career | Justin Trudeau (2015-2025) | |
| 21 | Dominic Barton | September 3, 2019 | November 22, 2019 | December 6, 2021 | Non-Career | Justin Trudeau (2015-2025) | |
| 22 | Jennifer May | September 22, 2022 | November 15, 2022 | | Career | Justin Trudeau (2015-2025) | |

== Embassy ==
The current embassy is located at 19 Dongzhimenwai Dajie in the Chaoyang District.

Official Address in English:
19 Dongzhimenwai Dajie,
Chaoyang District,
100600,
People's Republic of China

Official Address in Simplified Chinese:
中国 北京市 100600
朝阳区
东直门外大街19号

== See also ==
- Canada–China relations
- Canadian Consulate-General, Hong Kong for list of high commissioners and consul general to Hong Kong and Macau
- Canadian Consulate-General, Guangzhou – located at TaiKoo Hui
- Canadian Consulate-General, Chongqing – located at Metropolitan Tower
- Canadian Consulate-General, Shanghai – located at ECO City Building
