= List of high commissioners of Canada to New Zealand =

Ambassador of Canada to New Zealand
- Incumbent; Keith Smith since July 11, 2024
- Seat: Embassy of Canada, New Zealand
- Nominator: Prime Minister of Canada
- Appointer: Governor General of Canada
- Term length: At His Majesty's pleasure
- Inaugural holder: Walter Alexander Riddell
- Formation: February 1, 1940

The High Commissioner of Canada to New Zealand is the official representative of the Canadian government to the government of New Zealand. The official title for the ambassador is High Commissioner Canada in New Zealand. The current ambassador of Canada is Keith Smith who was appointed on the advice of Prime Minister Justin Trudeau on July 11, 2024.

The High Commission in Wellington also includes diplomatic ties to the Cook Islands and Niue as part of its region of responsibility but is not formally accredited to either.

== History of diplomatic relations ==
Diplomatic relations between Canada and New Zealand was established on September 11, 1939. Walter Alexander Riddell was appointed as Canada's first High Commissioner in New Zealand on February 1, 1940.

== List of heads of mission ==
No.	Name	Term of office			Career	Prime Minister nominated by	Ref.
No.	Name	Start date	PoC.	End date	Career	Prime Minister nominated by	Ref.
1	Walter Alexander Riddell	February 1, 1940	March 6, 1940	May 15, 1946	Career	W. L. Mackenzie King (1935–1948)	
2	Alfred Rive	June 16, 1946	August 21, 1946	August 1, 1952	Career	W. L. Mackenzie King (1935–1948)	
3	Egerton Herbert Norman	February 19, 1953	September 22, 1953	May 10, 1956	Career	Louis St. Laurent (1948–1957)	
4	Kenneth Porter Kirkwood	April 12, 1956	July 26, 1956	May 10, 1957	Career	Louis St. Laurent (1948–1957)	
5	Charles Eustace McGaughey	May 10, 1957		March 1958	Career	Louis St. Laurent (1948–1957)	
6	George Robert Cawdron Heasman	December 13, 1957	January 1958	March 9, 1963	Career	John G. Diefenbaker (1957–1963)	
7	Kenneth Joseph Burbridge	November 15, 1962	January 1963	January 20, 1967	Career	John G. Diefenbaker (1957–1963)	
8	Ronald Macalister Macdonnell	May 24, 1966	February 14, 1967	June 6, 1970	Career	Lester B. Pearson (1963–1968)	
9	John Alpine Dougan	June 11, 1970	August 31, 1970	August 1, 1974	Career	Pierre Elliott Trudeau (1968–1979) (1980–1984)	
10	Clive Edward Glover	June 10, 1974	October 8, 1974	June 16, 1978	Career	Pierre Elliott Trudeau (1968–1979) (1980–1984)	
11	Irene Elizabeth Johnson	June 8, 1978	October 11, 1978	June 12, 1981	Non-Career	Pierre Elliott Trudeau (1968–1979) (1980–1984)	
12	Charles Odilon Roger Rousseau	September 3, 1981	September 9, 1981	June 17, 1985	Career	Pierre Elliott Trudeau (1968–1979) (1980–1984)	
13	Albert Douglas Small	August 28, 1985	October 8, 1985	October 8, 1989	Career	Brian Mulroney (1984–1993)	
14	William Esmond Jarvis	October 4, 1990	January 23, 1991		Career	Brian Mulroney (1984–1993)	
15	Robert A. Wright	July 12, 1994	September 1, 1994	January 4, 1997	Career	Jean Chrétien (1993–2003)	
16	Joseph Anthony Malone	March 11, 1997		August 6, 1997	Career	Jean Chrétien (1993–2003)	
17	Valerie Raymond	July 10, 1997	September 3, 1997	August 6, 2001	Career	Jean Chrétien (1993–2003)	
18	John Donaghy	July 16, 2001	October 1, 2001	June 1, 2005	Career	Jean Chrétien (1993–2003)	
19	Penny Reedie	August 2, 2005	August 30, 2005	February 20, 2009	Non-Career	Paul Martin (2003–2006)	
20	Caroline Chrétien	May 14, 2009	September 7, 2009	June 26, 2015	Career	Stephen Harper (2006–2015)	
21	Mario Bot	March 31, 2015	July 15, 2015	August 31, 2019	Career	Stephen Harper (2006–2015)	
22	Joanne Lemay	April 14, 2021	August 3, 2021	August 24, 2024	Career	Justin Trudeau (2015–2025)	
23	Keith Smith	July 11, 2024	October 23, 2024		Career	Justin Trudeau (2015–2025)	
