= Robert Edmonds =

Robert Edmonds may refer to:

- Rob Edmonds (born 1962), Australian gymnast
- Robert Bradford Edmonds (died 2007), Canadian diplomat
- Lu Edmonds (Robert David Edmonds, born 1957), English rock and folk musician

== See also ==
- Robert Edmunds (disambiguation)
