= Robert Edmunds =

Robert Edmunds may refer to:

- Robert H. Edmunds Jr. (born 1949), North Carolina judge
- R. H. Edmunds (Robert Henry Edmunds, 1834–1917), surveyor, explorer and public servant in South Australia

== See also ==
- Robert Edmonds (disambiguation)
