= Howard Balloch =

Canadian diplomat

Howard Balloch is a former Canadian diplomat. He was Ambassador Extraordinary and Plenipotentiary to China, Mongolia and North Korea. Prior to his appointment as Ambassador, he served for two years in the Privy Council Office as Deputy Secretary to the Cabinet for National Unity, a key position in the federal government up to and during the Quebec referendum on sovereignty of 1995. He was appointed to that position shortly after the Liberal Party won the federal election of 1993, and up to that time had been serving as Assistant Deputy Minister for Asia Pacific in the Department of Foreign Affairs and International Trade and had served in Jakarta and Prague.

Balloch is from Newfoundland. At the end of the 19th century, his grandfather, a tea merchant, spent two decades residing in Fuzhou. Grandfather's paintings and photos sparked Balloch's interest in China. Balloch served as Canada's ambassador to China between 1996 and 2001, assuming the role after his predecessor, John Lawrence Paynter, died in office in 1995. He became the ambassador to North Korea in 2001 while retaining his China ambassadorship. In 2013, Balloch self-published his memoir Semi-Nomadic Anecdotes. With regard to the 1995 Quebec referendum, Paul Wells said the book provides "the most detailed account of the federal government’s actions during that historic campaign".

Following his retirement as ambassador in 2001, he founded The Balloch Group, a Beijing-based investment advisory and merchant banking firm. In Canada, reaction to the firm's founding was mixed, with people both praising his bravery and labeling him as "nuts". The firm's goal was to help Canadian businesses operate in China. Balloch was the president of the Canada China Business Council in 2005. After Canaccord Genuity purchased The Balloch Group, he became a company director and assumed the role of chairman of Canaccord Genuity Asia.

Diplomatic posts
Preceded by John Lawrence Paynter	Ambassador Extraordinary and Plenipotentiary to the People's Republic of China; 1996-	Succeeded by Joseph Caron
Preceded by John Lawrence Paynter	Ambassador Extraordinary and Plenipotentiary to the Mongolia; 1996-	Succeeded by Joseph Caron
Preceded by	Ambassador Extraordinary and Plenipotentiary to Democratic People's Republic of Korea; 2001-	Succeeded by Joseph Caron
