= Guy Saint-Jacques =

Canadian diplomat

Guy Saint-Jacques CM is a Canadian retired diplomat who served as Canada's ambassador to China from 26 September 2012 until 9 October 2016.

== Career ==
Saint-Jacques joined the Department of Foreign Affairs in 1977. He served in New York City, Mexico City, Kinshasa, Hong Kong, Washington and London.

Saint-Jacques was appointed Ambassador for Climate Change in 2010. He was appointed to Beijing by Stephen Harper in September 2012, and presented his credentials to Hu Jintao. He liaised in Beijing extensively with Cong Peiwu, while the latter was Director-General of the Chinese Department of North American and Oceanian Affairs.

Saint-Jacques retired after almost 40 years of service in October 2016, while Stephane Dion was Minister of Foreign Affairs and just short of one year after the Trudeau government came to power.

== Post-retirement ==
Saint-Jacques made the headlines in July 2019, when reports emerged that someone at the PMO had convinced Paul Thoppil, ADM for Asia-Pacific at Global Affairs Canada, to call him to ask him to not comment on China in the media. In response, Saint-Jacques suggested the PMO should call him directly if it has a problem with what he is saying. It was also reported that the PMO had employed similar tactics with another Ambassador, David Mulroney. Following the reports, Global Affairs Minister, Chrystia Freeland, called Saint-Jacques privately to apologize, while Liberal MPs quashed a motion for an investigation by a Parliamentary subcommittee into the affair. The treatment of the two Ambassadors was criticized by former diplomat Colin Robertson, who said, "The federal government looks committed to hearing no evil, seeing no evil and doing nothing on the China file, for fear of further upsetting Beijing. That is no policy for Canada."

In December 2024, Saint-Jacques was named a Member of the Order of Canada, Canadians deemed to have made extraordinary contributions to the nation. He lives in Saint-Lambert, Quebec.

== Positions ==
In March 2019, Saint-Jacques suggested that, in retaliation for China's suspension of canola imports from Canada, that Canada could expel Chinese athletes who were training in Canada for the 2022 Beijing Winter Games and could bring Beijing before the UN Security Council where it could level accusations of bad faith. He also suggested bringing the Chinese to the WTO process.

In early May 2020, Saint-Jacques expressed his support for Canada taking refugees from Hong Kong in light of the police crackdown on 2019–20 Hong Kong protests.
