= Edward Lucien Bobinski =

Canadian former diplomat

Edward Lucien Bobinski (born 3 October 1932) is a Canadian former diplomat. Bobinski was born in Montreal in 1932. In 1976 he was appointed concurrently as Ambassador Extraordinary and Plenipotentiary to Saudi Arabia, the Yemen Arab Republic and to the People's Republic of Yemen and later to Somalia then the Philippines.

After retirement Bobinski settled in Vancouver, British Columbia. He became an avid golfer.

Diplomatic posts
Preceded by Michael Shenstone	Ambassador Extraordinary and Plenipotentiary to Saudi Arabia; 1976-1979	Succeeded by William John Jenkins
Preceded by Michael Shenstone	Ambassador Extraordinary and Plenipotentiary to the Yemen Arab Republic; 1976-1979	Succeeded by William John Jenkins
Preceded by Michael Shenstone	Ambassador Extraordinary and Plenipotentiary to the People's Republic of Yemen; 1976-1979	Succeeded by William John Jenkins
Preceded by Robert Wallace McLaren	Ambassador Extraordinary and Plenipotentiary to Somalia; 1978-1979	Succeeded by William John Jenkins
Preceded by John Arnold Irwin	Ambassador Extraordinary and Plenipotentiary to the Philippines; 1979-1983	Succeeded by Reginald Hardy Dorrett
