= Margaret Skok =

Canadian diplomat

- Citizenship: Canadian
- Education: Carleton University
- Occupation: Diplomat
- Parent(s): Anatol and Elizabeth Skok (born Korolkiewicz)

Margaret Skok is a Canadian former diplomat and ambassador to the Republic of Kazakhstan, the Kyrgyz Republic and the Republic of Tajikistan serving from September 2006 to October 2009. She is also a Senior Fellow, at Carleton University, Norman Paterson School of International Affairs.

== Career ==
Her federal career began with the Royal Canadian Mounted Police, Canada Employment and Immigration, and Parks Canada, working in Ottawa and Montreal.

In 2006, she succeeded Anna Biolik as the Ambassador the Republic of Kazakhstan, the Kyrgyz Republic and the Republic of Tajikistan serving till October 2009.

She was a senior fellow at Centre for International Governance Innovation. She was involved in building cooperation to Kazakhstan

== Works ==
- Canada’s got a future on the modern Silk Road Centre for International Governance Innovation, December 16, 2015
