= Norman Berlis =

Canadian diplomat (1914–2003)

Norman Frederick Henderson Berlis (8 April 1914 – 10 May 2003) was a Canadian diplomat. He was Secretary and Officer-in-charge Permanent Delegation to the United Nations in Geneva then High Commissioner to Tanganyika, Tanzania then Uganda. He was also ambassador to Kenya and High Commissioner to Zanzibar and then the Ambassador Extraordinary and Plenipotentiary to Poland, Austria (where, since 1971, Canadian Ambassadors to Austria have been accredited to the Office of the United Nations at Vienna), and to the United Nations Industrial Development Organization then to Denmark. During his time as ambassador to Austria, on behalf of the Government of Canada he signed Canada's Comprehensive Safeguards Agreement under the Treaty on the Non-Proliferation of Nuclear Weapons with the International Atomic Energy Agency's Sigvard Eklund.

Diplomatic posts
Preceded by Leolyn Dana Wilgress	Secretary and Officer-in-charge Permanent Delegation to the United Nations in Geneva; 1948-1952	Succeeded by Paul Émile Renaud
Preceded by Position created	High Commissioner to Tanganyika; 1962-1964	Succeeded by Position abolished
Preceded by Position created	High Commissioner to Tanzania; 1962-1965	Succeeded by Allan Sydney McGill
Preceded by James Wall	High Commissioner to Uganda; 1962-1965	Succeeded by Karl Johansen
Preceded by Robert Wallace McLaren	High Commissioner to Uganda; 1963-	Succeeded by Allan Sydney McGill
Preceded by Alan Pittman McLaine	Ambassador to Kenya; 1964-1965	Succeeded by Allan Sydney McGill
Preceded by Position created	High Commissioner to Zanzibar; 1964-	Succeeded by Position abolished
Preceded by John Arnold Irwin	Ambassador Extraordinary and Plenipotentiary to Poland; 1965-1967	Succeeded by Pamela Ann McDougall
Preceded by John Alexander McCordick	Ambassador Extraordinary and Plenipotentiary to Austria; 1969-1973	Succeeded by John Alan Beesley
Preceded by Donald Macalister Cornett	Ambassador Extraordinary and Plenipotentiary to Denmark; 1975-1979	Succeeded by Marion Adams Macpherson
