= Fred Bild =

German-born Canadian holocaust survivor and retired diplomat (born 1935)

Canadian ambassador to Mongolia
- In office 1992 – December 4, 1994
- Preceded by: Michael Richard Bell
- Succeeded by: John Lawrence Paynter

Canadian ambassador to China
- In office October 11, 1990 – December 4, 1994
- Preceded by: Earl Gordon Drake
- Succeeded by: John Lawrence Paynter

Canadian ambassador to Vietnam
- In office September 19, 1979 – August 13, 1983
- Preceded by: Arthur Redpath Menzies
- Succeeded by: John Lawrence Paynter

Canadian ambassador to Thailand
- In office August 24, 1979 – August 13, 1983
- Preceded by: William Edward Bauer
- Succeeded by: John Lawrence Paynter

Canadian ambassador to Laos
- In office November 17, 1979 – August 13, 1983
- Preceded by: William Edward Bauer
- Succeeded by: John Lawrence Paynter

Canadian ambassador to Myanmar
- In office 1979 – August 13, 1983
- Preceded by: William Edward Bauer
- Succeeded by: John Lawrence Paynter

Personal details
- Born: M. Fred Bild; August 7, 1935 (age 91) Leipzig, Germany
- Spouse: Eva Bild
- Education: University College London

M. Fred Bild (born August 7, 1935) is a German-born Canadian retired diplomat who served within Global Affairs Canada, the foreign ministry of Canada. During his 34-year diplomatic career, he served as the Canadian ambassador to China (1990–1994), Mongolia (1992–1994), and to Thailand, Vietnam, Myanmar, and Laos (1979–1983).

Born to a Jewish family in Leipzig, Germany, Bild and his family fled to Belgium after the Nazi Kristallnacht pogrom in late 1938. From 1943 until the end of World War II, Bild and his brother were hidden with the help of the Committee for the Defence of Jews within the Belgian Resistance. After the war, the Bilds immigrated to Montreal, Canada, in 1948.

== Early life ==
=== Life in Germany ===
Fred Bild was born in Leipzig, Germany, on August 7, 1935, to Joseph and Ida. Joseph worked as a furrier. His mother was from Bavaria. The father of Henry Kissinger, future U.S. Secretary of State, was the Jewish teacher of Bild's mother.

The Kristallnacht pogrom on November 9–10, 1938 accelerated the family's efforts to emigrate from the increasingly lethal antisemitism in Nazi Germany. By late 1938, the Bild family had successfully arrived in Antwerp, Belgium. They settled in the Marneffe refugee camp, which the Belgians had set up to handle the large influx of Jewish refugees fleeing Nazi persecution.

=== Escape to and hiding in Belgium ===
The Bilds were in Marneffe when the Germans invaded Belgium in May 1940. They travelled over 3 weeks to the French border, only to discover the Nazis had already invaded France as well. The family then returned to Marneffe, which was by then under Nazi occupation.

Bild's father was ordered to do forced labour in Limburg in the Netherlands. After he returned, the family moved to Brussels in mid-1941. To support the family, Bild's mother would periodically travel from Brussels to Antwerp to sell clothes and stockings. On one occasion, she was arrested in Antwerp and imprisoned for six weeks.

In September 1942, Fred's father Joseph was arrested on the street and deported to Auschwitz, where he was murdered. At the time, Ida was pregnant with the couple's second child. After the birth of Fred's brother Jack in March 1943, Bild's mother was in contact with the Belgian Resistance, who smuggled food and money to the family to help them survive. Fred's mother asked the Committee for the Defence of Jews for help with finding hiding places for her two young sons.

After the beginning of the Allied invasion of Sicily in September 1943, Fred travelled with 18-year-old Martín Aguirre y Otegui, a refugee from Spain and activist in the Catholic Church's rescue network, to Louvain, then to the home of the Archbishop of Malines in Malines. From there, Aguirre y Otegui helped to smuggle Fred to a nunnery and finally to a farm in the village of Lubbeek. Fred would spend the remainder of the war here, with the Robberechts family, one of only two families in the region to shelter Jewish children during the war. In June 1945, the Bild family, except for Joseph Bild, reunited in Brussels.

In 2011, Yad Vashem recognized Martín Aguirre y Otegui and the Robberechts as Righteous Among Nations for facilitating Fred's safety during the war.

=== Post-war ===
Bild lived with his mother in Brussels until 1948, when they immigrated to Montreal, Canada. Because Bild was a Jew, he was not allowed to attend French school, which admitted only Catholics. Instead, he enrolled in a Protestant school in Côte-des-Neiges. At this school, he met his future wife Eva.

As a teenager, Bild attended a B'nai B'rith camp where future actor William Shatner was a counselor. Over six weeks at the camp, Shatner helped Bild learn English.

Bild reunited with Eva when they were students at Concordia University. The couple moved to London, where they married soon after arrival, and where Fred earned a degree from University College London. He applied for the Canadian foreign service exam in London, and was accepted to the foreign service in 1961.

== Diplomatic career ==
Bild's diplomatic career included stints in Japan, Laos, and Paris. In 1979, he became the ambassador to Thailand. He then served as minister-councillor at the Canadian Embassy in Paris. In 1990, he was appointed as Canadian ambassador to China and to Mongolia.

== Later career ==
After retirement from the foreign service, Bild taught at the Centre of East Asian Studies at the University of Montreal.

== Personal ==
Bild speaks German, French, and English.

== See also ==
- Kristallnacht in Leipzig

== Sources ==
- Clarkson, Adrienne (2011). Room for All of Us: Surprising Stories Of Loss And Transformation. Toronto: Allen Lane Canada. ISBN 978-0670065479.
