= Ken Burbridge =

Canadian diplomat (1911–2000)

Canadian High Commissioner to New Zealand
- In office 1963–1967
- Preceded by: George Heasman
- Succeeded by: Ronald Macdonnell

Personal details
- Born: Kenneth Joseph Burbridge; July 2, 1911 Bathurst, New Brunswick, Canada
- Died: June 25, 2000 (aged 88) Ottawa, Ontario, Canada
- Spouse: Marion Catherine Smith (m. 1943; died 1999)
- Children: 2
- Occupation: Civil servant; diplomat

Academic background
- Education: University of Ottawa
- Thesis: The co-operative movement (1943)

Kenneth Joseph Burbridge (July 2, 1911 – June 25, 2000) was a Canadian diplomat. He was the high commissioner of Canada to New Zealand between 1963 and 1967.

== Early life and education ==
Born in Bathurst, New Brunswick on July 2, 1911, Burbridge was the son of Elizabeth Burbridge (née Foley) and Harry Burbridge, a fireman.

Burbridge earned Bachelor of Civil Law and Master of Arts degrees at the University of New Brunswick and St. Francis Xavier University, before completing a PhD in political science at the University of Ottawa in 1943. The title of his doctoral thesis was The co-operative movement.

On November 20, 1943, Burbridge married Marion Catherine Smith at St George's Church in Ottawa West.

== Career ==
During World War II, Burbridge was a legal adviser in the Civil Service of Canada. In 1947, he joined the Department of External Affairs, based in Ottawa, as a legal adviser. In 1954, he was appointed Canadian deputy permanent representative to the North Atlantic Council and the Organisation for European Economic Co-operation in Paris. He served in that role until 1957 when he became the Canadian consul-general in Seattle.

Burbridge was named as the Canadian high commissioner to New Zealand in November 1962, and took up the post in March 1963. In January 1967, shortly before relinquishing the role of high commissioner, Burbridge presented a trophy, the Canada Cup, to the Wellington Ice Hockey League, to be contested annually among senior teams in the league.

== Later life and death ==
Burbridge was predeceased by his wife, Marion, in 1999. He died in Ottawa on June 25, 2000, at the age of 88.

Diplomatic posts
| Preceded by George Heasman | High Commissioner of Canada to New Zealand; 1963–1967 | Succeeded by Ronald Macdonnell |
