= Susan Harper (diplomat) =

Canadian diplomat

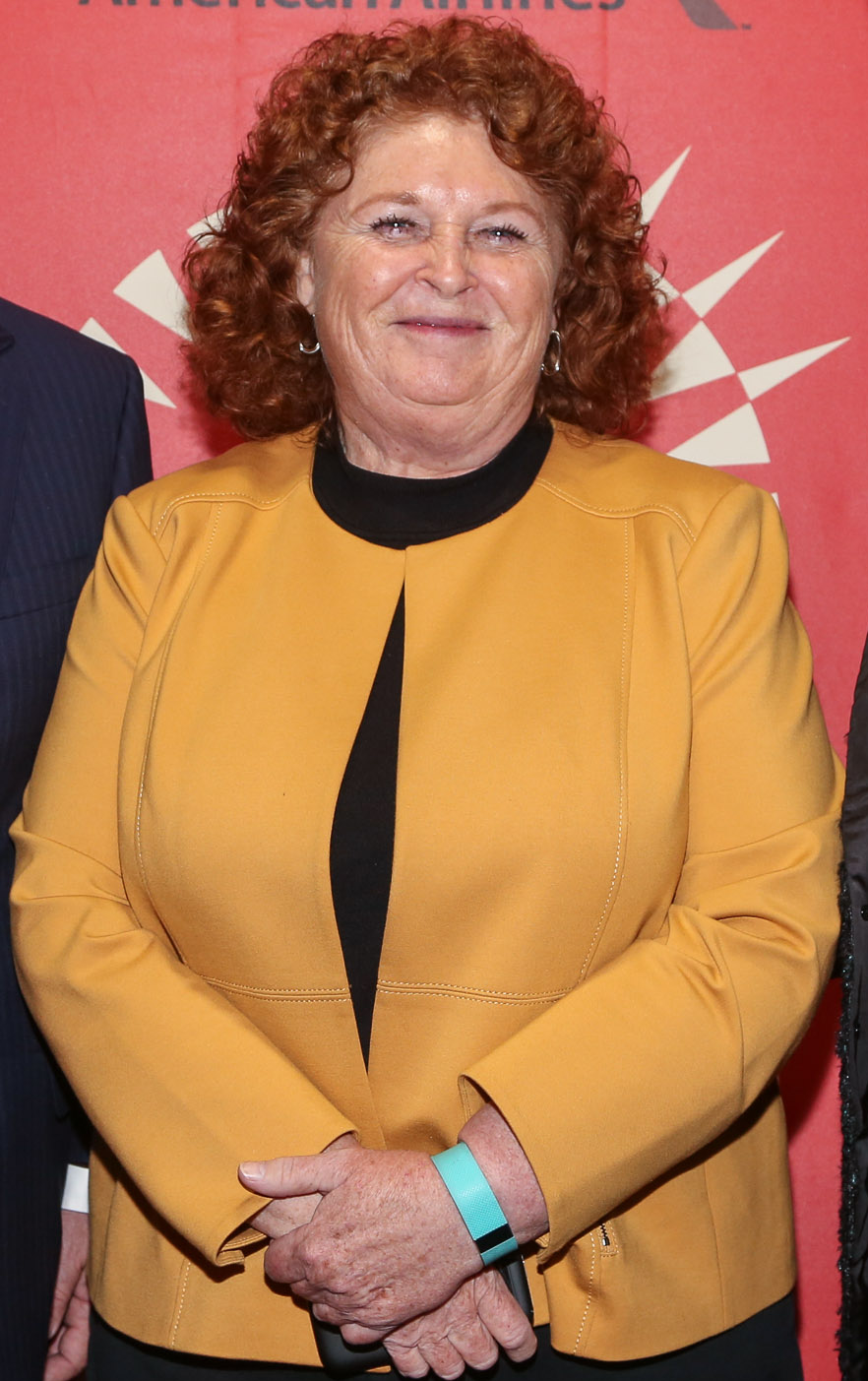
- Harper at the 2017 Miami International Film Festival
- Born: 1953 (age 72–73); Toronto, Ontario

Susan Harper (born 1953 in Toronto, Ontario) is a senior Canadian diplomat with the Ministry of Foreign Affairs. She served as Canadian Ambassador to Uruguay from 2001 to 2004. She served as Chair of the Arctic Council from 2014 – 2015.

Harper joined Foreign Affairs Canada in 1983. She has been on posting to Yaoundé, Paris, Washington D.C., and Buenos Aires. She served as President of the Professional Association of Foreign Service Officers, the organization that represents Canada's professional diplomats.

Harper is an alumna of Queen's University and Ivey School of Business at University of Western Ontario, where she obtained an MBA in 1983. She is a polyglot and speaks English, French, and Spanish.

From January 2016 to October 2022, Harper served as Consul General of Canada in Miami, Florida. In November 2022, she was appointed as Consul General of the Consulate General of Canada in Dallas, Texas, and the Consulate of Canada in Houston, Texas.
