= John Andrew Licharson =

Canadian diplomat

John Licharson was a Canadian diplomat and career civil servant. He joined the Department of External Affairs on June 9, 1969.

In 1971–1973, he served as third/second secretary, Canadian High Commission, Dar es Salaam, Tanzania (concurrently accredited to Mauritius and Mozambique). He returned to Ottawa, where he served in the African Affairs (Anglophone) Division 1974–1976. He was posted as first secretary (economic), at the Canadian embassy, Seoul, Korea, 1976–78. In 1978, he was posted as first secretary in the Canadian High Commission, Lusaka, Zambia (concurrently accredited to Malawi and, from 1980 to Zimbabwe), where in his last six months he also served as chargé d'affaires.

He served as counsellor at the Canadian High Commission, Kingston, Jamaica (concurrently accredited to The Bahamas and Belize) 1983–1985 and was Chef de Mission at the Canadian liaison office, Nassau, Bahamas in 1985.

From 1986 to 1988, he was deputy director, Economic Relations with Developing Countries Division, where he represented Canada at numerous meetings at UNCTAD (United Nations Conference on Trade and Development in Geneva and at the UN (United Nations) headquarters in New York.

After two years in the Trade Policy Bureau as deputy director in the General Agreement on Tariffs and Trade Division, where he was deputy chief negotiator in negotiations on alcoholic beverages trade with the European Commission, he resigned from DFAIT in 1990.

He served as senior advisor on Internal Trade Issues in Industry Canada from 1990 to 1998. During that time, he was the principal drafter of the 1991 Intergovernmental Agreement on Beer Marketing Practices and, as deputy of the Internal Trade Negotiations Secretariat, of several sections of the 1995 Internal Trade Agreement.

He joined the Privy Council Office in 1998 and retired as Director, Economic and Regional Development Policy in July, 2002.

From 2007 to 2017, he served on the (volunteer) board of directors of the Prince Edward-Lennox & Addington Community Futures Development Corporation. He was chairman of the board from 2009 to 2011 and chairman of its investment review committee from 2011 to 2013.

In addition to his professional career, he owned and operated TLA Custom Models, a railway-oriented custom modelling service and hobby supply company from 1991 to 2020. He has written articles for several print and on-line publications (Model Railroader, NMRA Magazine, The Interchange). His wildlife (bird) photography has been used in several on-line bird resource apps and sites (Birdseye, All about Birds).
