= Martha Buckley-Jones =

Canadian diplomat

Martha Dilys Buckley-Jones is a former Canadian diplomat. She was appointed Chargé d'Affaires a.i. to Guatemala then as High Commissioner to Trinidad and Tobago then concurrently to Zambia and Malawi.

Her work in multiple countries has been cited in the news. In the late 1960s, while Buckley-Jones worked at the Canadian embassy in Lima, Peru, her work centered on providing visas and information for the Canadian citizens living in Peru. In 1984, The Globe and Mail noted she was called "a tower of strength in Canada's External Affairs Department" as she helped Canadians leave Nicaragua during political crisis in Latin America.

In 1985, Buckley-Jones worked at the embassy in Lebanon when the staff of the Canadian embassy moved from Lebanon to Beirut due to safety concerns, and discussed the presence of Canadian citizens in Iran during the 1985 departure of foreigners from Iran. She discussed Canada's support of the United States and Great Britain in interactions with the Soviet Union, and smooths diplomatic incidents such as Jim Karygiannis's issues when he visited Trinidad in 1991.

In 1990, Buckley-Jones was named as official at the rank of ambassador to Guatemala, which was controversial given the human rights abuses in Guatemala. In her work in the Canadian External Affairs department, Buckley-Jones is widely cited, including discussions on recovery of hostages from southern Sudan, issues surrounding the appointment of Bryce Mackasey as ambassador to Portugal, and relations between Canada and the Vatican the United States and Mexico.

She has provided advice for Canadians traveling overseas, and worked to help Canadians encountering legal difficulties while they are overseas.

Diplomatic posts
Preceded by Mary Mosser	High Commissioner to Zambia; 1997–	Succeeded by Michael B. Phillips
Preceded by Mary Mosser	High Commissioner to Malawi; 1997–	Succeeded by David M. Stockwell
Preceded by Rodney Irwin	High Commissioner to Trinidad and Tobago; 1990–	Succeeded by Jean Nadeau
Preceded by Raymond Chrétien	Chargé d'Affaires a.i. to Guatemala; 1987–1990	Succeeded by David John Sydney Winfield
