= Ross Hornby =

Canadian lawyer, public servant and diplomat

Ross Hornby is a Canadian lawyer, public servant and diplomat who was Canada's Ambassador to the European Union in Brussels, from June 2006 to July 2011. Prior to that, he had many posts including the Foreign Service Legal Bureau and Canada Permanent Mission at the United Nations in Geneva, senior counsel at the Canadian Department of Justice, general counsel at the Canadian Department of Finance, and Head of Legal Services at the Treasury Board Secretariat of Canada.

Hornby received a Bachelor of Arts at the University of British Columbia in 1975, a Master of Arts at the University of Toronto in 1976 and a Bachelor of Laws at Osgoode Hall Law School in 1980.

Diplomatic posts
Preceded by Jeremy Kinsman	Canadian Ambassador to the European Union; 2006–2011	Succeeded by H. David Plunkett
