= Anna Biolik =

Canadian diplomat

Anna Biolik is a Canadian diplomat. She is the Regional Director of the Department of Foreign Affairs and International Trade's Vancouver Regional Office. She was Canada's first Ambassador to Mongolia. She has been head of Canada's mission in St Petersburg in the Russian Federation, Kazakhstan, Kyrgyzstan and Tajikistan.

== Life ==
Biolik's parents emigrated to Canada from Poland after World War 2. Her roots in Poland are reflected in her coat of arms which was granted to her in 2003.

Biolik was Canada's Consul General to Saint Petersburg, Russian Federation from 2001 to 2004. She is fluent in Russian and she encouraged sustainable development as a likely area for cooperation between Canada and Russia as they share a similar interest in the frozen north.

Biolik was Ambassador Extraordinary and Plenipotentiary to Kazakhstan from 2004 to 2006, with concurrent accreditation to the Republic of Kyrgyzstan and the Republic of Tajikistan. In 2006 she outlined Canada's concerns about drug smuggling. She was briefed by Tajikistan ’s Drug Control Agency about their work. She wanted to ensure that Afghanistan's neighbours were aware as she saw that country's stability as key to the region. She was replaced in 2006 by Margaret Skok.

Biolik was Canada's first Ambassador to Mongolia in 2008. Canada is the second largest investor in Mongolia after Russia - where she had previously been head of mission. She was thanked by Prime Minister Sükhbaataryn Batbold when she left. She was succeeded by J. Gregory Goldhawk.

In 2011, she was appointed as the Regional Director of the Department of Foreign Affairs and International Trade's Vancouver Regional Office.

Diplomatic posts
Preceded by	Consul General, St. Petersburg, Russian Federation; 2001-2004	Succeeded by
Preceded by Hector Cowan	Ambassador Extraordinary and Plenipotentiary to Kazakhstan; 2004-2006	Succeeded by Margaret Skok
Preceded by Gerald R. Skinner	Ambassador Extraordinary and Plenipotentiary to the Republic of Kyrgyzstan; 2004-2006	Succeeded by Margaret Skok
Preceded by Gerald R. Skinner	Ambassador Extraordinary and Plenipotentiary to the Republic of Tajikistan; 2004-2006	Succeeded by Margaret Skok
Preceded by	Ambassador Extraordinary and Plenipotentiary to Mongolia; 2008-	Succeeded by Greg Goldhawk
