= Roy William Blake =

Canadian diplomat (1906–1994)

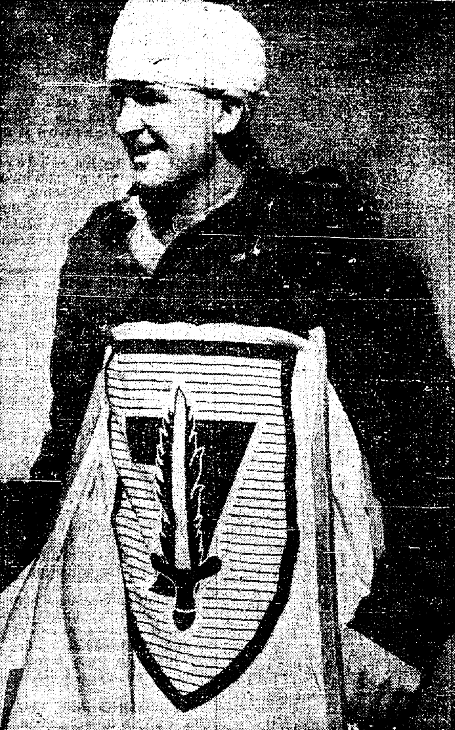
Captain Roy Blake promoting Victory Loans in 1944.

Roy William Blake (7 March 1906 – 11 July 1994) was a Canadian diplomat. Born near London, Ontario, Blake was a graduate of the University of Saskatchewan. During World War II Blake served as a captain in the Saskatoon Light Infantry. While serving in Italy he suffered an injury which permanently crippled him.

In 1954 Blake was the Canadian Trade Commissioner to Australia. That year, Blake, his wife, and their two sons embarked on a five-month world tour which was described as part business trip and part holiday. Blake toured industrial centres in Canada to discuss trade with Australia.

Blake stayed in Australia until at least 1956 but by 1957 had moved to Port of Spain, Trinidad where he was Trade Commissioner to the Caribbean countries. That year Blake published a report in the Canadian Foreign Trade journal reporting that subsidised flour from the United States was hurting Canadian wheat and flour sales to that region.

In 1960, as an assistant director of the Department of Trade and Commerce, Blake led a trade mission to Britain. Later, Blake and his family spent two and a half years in Kingston, Jamaica, where he was again commercial counselor. For some months in 1962 Blake was acting High Commissioner to Jamaica until he was replaced by the permanent appointee to that post, Graham Campbell McInnes.

In 1964 Blake was appointed Consul General to West Germany. From 1967 until 1969 Blake was Consul General to Italy.

Diplomatic posts
Preceded by Established	Acting High Commissioner to Jamaica; 1962-1962	Succeeded by Graham Campbell McInnes
Preceded by	Consul General to the Federal Republic of Germany; 1964-	Succeeded by
Preceded by	Consul General to Italy; 1967-1969	Succeeded by
