= Jacques Edmond Brossard =

Canadian diplomat (1933–2010)

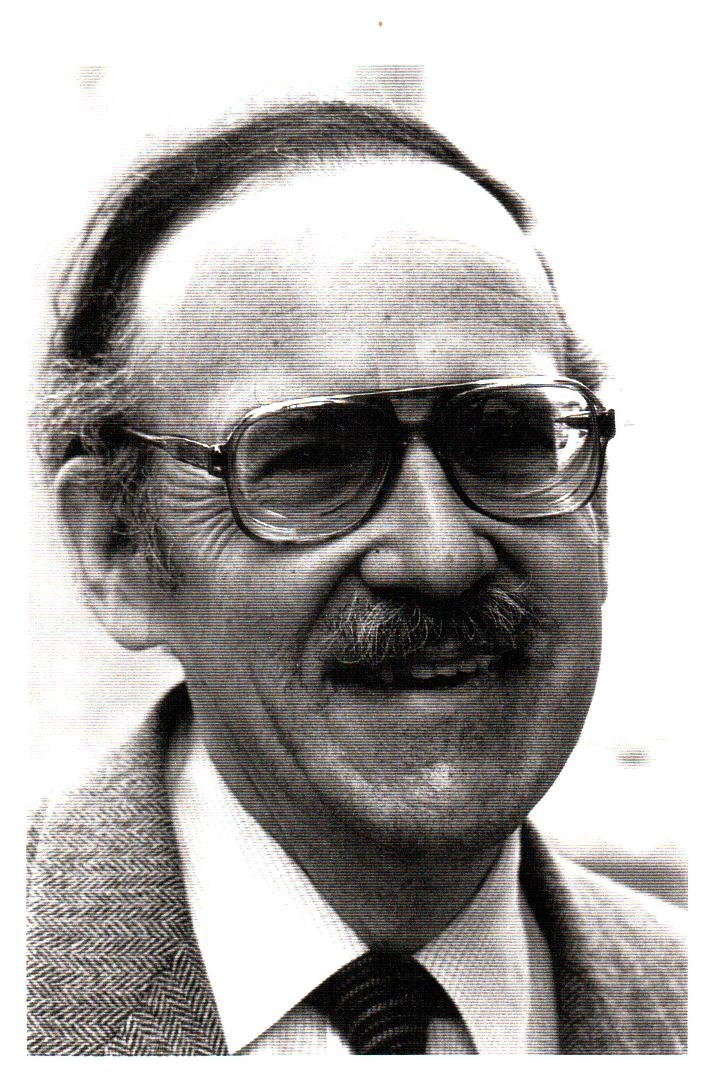
- Picture of Jacques Edmond Brossard

Canadian Chargé d'affaires a.i. to Haiti
- In office June 1, 1960 – May 1, 1961
- Preceded by: Allan Cunningham Anderson (Ambassador)
- Succeeded by: Peter Rowley Jennings

Personal details
- Born: April 24, 1933
- Died: August 5, 2010 (aged 77)
- Education: Collège Sainte-Marie de Montréal (B.A.); Université de Montréal (L ès L); University of Oxford
- Occupation: Civil servant, author

Jacques Edmond Brossard (April 24, 1933–August 5, 2010) was a Canadian diplomat and author. He was Chargé d'affaires a.i. to Haiti.

== Early life ==
Brossard was born in Montreal. He graduated from the Collège Sainte-Marie de Montréal, the Université de Montréal, and the University of Oxford.

== Career ==
=== Diplomatic career ===
After his graduation from Oxford, Brossard joined the Canadian foreign service in 1957. He was assigned to the Colombo Plan and then to NATO. Brossard was posted as Canada's vice consul to Colombia and consul to Haiti. He also served as chargé d'affaires in both countries, eventually becoming executive assistant to the foreign minister.

=== Post-diplomatic career ===
In 1964, Brossard left the diplomatic corps to research constitutional issues at the Université de Montréal. Five years later, the Quebec government appointed him as an advisor on these matters. His writings as a civil servant helped fuel the rise of the sovereigntist movement.

Brossard also became a prominent author of short stories and novels. Science fiction was his genre of choice. In 1990, the Canadian Science Fiction and Fantasy Association awarded him with the Aurora Award for his novel Lés années d'apprentissage. Jean-Louis Trudel labelled the work one of the top ten works of French Canadian science fiction. Brossard later expanded on this novel into a five-volume set known as L'oiseau de feu. Other awards won by Brossard include the Prix Boréal and the Prix Duvernay.

== Legacy ==
The Grand Prix de la Science-fiction et du fantastique québécois was renamed the Prix Jacques Brossard in his honor. Brossard had won the award for his novel Lés années d'apprentissage.

Diplomatic posts
Preceded by Allan Cunningham Anderson	Chargé d'affaires a.i. to Haiti; 1960–1961	Succeeded by Peter Rowley Jennings
