= Elizabeth Pauline MacCallum =

Canadian diplomat (1895–1985)

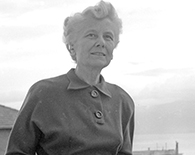
MacCallum as chargé d’affaires in Beirut.

Elizabeth Pauline MacCallum (June 20, 1895 – June 12, 1985) was a Canadian adviser, diplomat, and leading Middle East expert and research analyst for Canada in the 1940s and 1950s. Born in the Ottoman Empire to Canadian parents, she immigrated to Canada as a teenager to pursue her secondary and higher educations while working part-time as a teacher to fund her studies. She began her postgraduate career as an assistant editor and secretary of the Social Service Council of Canada, before joining the New York Foreign Policy Association as a writer-researcher. With time, she became an expert in Middle Eastern affairs, and she contributed to Canadian diplomacy with the Israeli-Palestinian conflict, including Canada's involvement in the United Nations Special Committee on Palestine (UNSCOP) and the Majority Plan for the partition of Palestine. In her late career, MacCallum served in Athens in place of an absent ambassador, and when she was chargé d’affaires in Beirut, she was the first Canadian woman to lead an official foreign post. She was later inducted into the Order of Canada in 1967 in recognition of her work for the country.

== Early life and education ==
Elizabeth Pauline MacCallum was born on June 20, 1895, in Marash—present day Kahramanmaraş, Turkey—in the Ottoman Empire to Canadian Presbyterian missionaries. There she learned Arabic and Turkish and was homeschooled. Upon being awarded the Sir Sanford Fleming scholarship for mathematics, MacCallum moved to Canada to attend the Kingston Collegiate Institute.

After completing her secondary education at Kingston, MacCallum attained her teacher's certificate and taught in Alberta prairie schools for two years. With the money she earned from teaching, and a Watkins scholarship awarded for her work at Kingston, MacCallum went on to complete her master's degree in English and History, additionally earning gold medals in History, at Queen's University in 1919.

MacCallum returned to teaching for several more years in Yukon before resuming her postgraduate studies in European history and political science at Columbia University in 1921. In 1922, she paused her studies to work as assistant editor position with Social Welfare journal and as assistant secretary of the Social Service Council of Canada. She returned briefly to Columbia University once more in 1924, from which she was referred to join the New York Foreign Policy Association (FPA) by her professors.

== Interwar career ==
In 1925, MacCallum was brought to work at the FPA by James McDonald, then FPA chairman and later first American ambassador to Israel. She worked there for over 6 years as a writer-researcher, producing more than twenty publications. She resigned in 1931 due to a hearing disability, though later acquired a hearing aid.

Her work addressed a variety of topics, such as Australian and Balkan affairs, but most of her works were about the Middle East, including her first book, which became a “standard university text, The Nationalist Crusade in Syria".

Following her work with the FPA, she moved to southern Ontario to a two-acre farm for four years. There, she grew most of her own food and continued studying trends in the Middle East. In that time, she also met George Antonious, the author of The Arab Awakening, on a lecture tour.

In 1935, commissioned by the World Peace Foundation, she wrote Rivalries in Ethiopia about British, French, and Italian interests in Ethiopia. She gave lectures and radio talks for 50 dollars each about Ethiopian affairs and other international subjects at the invitation of the World Peace Foundation, the League of Nations Association in the United States, the League of Nations Society in Canada, and the Canadian Institute of International Affairs. Then from 1936 to 1941, she served as the Head of Literature Services at the League of Nations Society in Canada.

In this position, she was responsible for communicating information about international affairs to the Canadian public, as well as public servants and school teachers. She also briefly communicated with Antonious about her 1939 review of The Arab Awakening in the Canadian Forum and shared that she intended to help with the “setting up of Jewish agricultural communities near Montreal.”

She eventually left for the Canadian Legion Educational Services when the Literature Services workload declined significantly. MacCallum began working as CEO of the educational services, but she resigned when the professional recommendations of the Legion's librarians were dismissed in favor of a reading list curated by the director.

== Department of External Affairs ==
=== Early work ===
In July 1942, MacCallum started working for the Civil Service Commission (CSC) after she applied with references from H.M. Tory, former President of the League of Nations Society in Canada; J.E. Robbins, former director of the Canadian Legion Educational Services; and Raymond Leslie Bell, former President of the FPA. Her salary was low relative to that at the FPA, and women were legally limited to clerical positions only, however the head clerk to the undersecretary ensured MacCallum had roles in researching weekly summaries and special reports on developing international affairs.

In 1943, along with a pay raise, the Canadian Prime Minister gave MacCallum the responsibility of analyzing the 1939 British White Paper and the Palestinian conflict, research which would then be used to inform correspondence with the Zionist Organization of Canada. Her research was used with no changes as part of the Prime Minister's exchanges with the Organization.

MacCallum continued to work for the Prime Minister, once again conducting a formal analysis of the 1939 British White Paper, this time in reference to the Canadian Palestine Committee in 1944. This analysis was completed without the inclusion of policy recommendations, though her later work would expand to include such responsibilities.

=== Service at the San Francisco Conference ===
MacCallum attended the 1945 United Nations conference in San Francisco, where she was one of only six women delegates. As a technical advisor for the Canadian delegation on International Trusteeship, she was in attendance to share her expertise about Middle East affairs and League of Nations Mandate System with Canadian delegates to committees. The Mandate System was ostensibly being replaced with a new International Trusteeship system at the conference.

Ultimately, the final terms of the Trusteeship system were negotiated and set primarily by the Great Powers—the United States, Great Britain, France, Russia, and China. The overarching perspective of the Canadian delegation was that the Great Powers were fundamental to a functional United Nations, so any actions that might antagonize them were deliberately minimized and MacCallum was left with little opportunity to provide her perspective.

=== Work concerning the Anglo-American Committee of Inquiry ===
In late 1945, growing differences between Great Britain and the United States in their views for long term management of the Palestine Mandate inspired the formation of the Anglo-American Committee of Inquiry. Ostensibly, the joint committee would work to find a long-term plan acceptable to both nations, and the United States agreed under the conditions that the committee work no longer than 120 days and that its scope be limited to Palestine alone.

The American emphasis on speedy action concerned Canadian officials already worried by Anglo-American tensions. The Canadian ambassador to Washington, Lester Pearson, turned to the Department of External Affairs for insight, and MacCallum prepared analytical memos. In the very first, she identified the stark divide between Great Britain and the United States over their understandings of the Palestine Mandate and the Jewish refugee crisis. Great Britain envisioned some Jewish refugees settling in Palestine while others returned to their countries of origin; the United States believed that settlement in Palestine alone was an appropriate solution for the refugee crisis.

In July 1946, the British high commissioner to Canada shared with Canadian officials a summary of findings by the recently concluded Anglo-American Committee of Inquiry. The high commissioner also asked that Canada accept Jewish refugees and issue an official statement in support of all UN member states accepting refugees. In response, MacCallum wrote “Statement on Displaced Persons and Palestine,” a working paper requested by the acting undersecretary of state for external affairs. She emphasized the efforts of the Canadian government up to that point in support of Jewish refugees and its support for a resolution of the Palestine Mandate respecting both Arab and Jewish communities.

One month later, MacCallum wrote "Background of Discussions on Palestine” for presentation to the acting undersecretary and the prime minister. She studied recommendations from the Anglo-American Committee and affirmed the danger in diverging perspectives between the United States and Great Britain. She highlighted with most concern the recommendation that 100,000 Jewish refugees be accepted into Palestine. In her view, it was emblematic of the strong differences in Anglo-American attitude and would cause major regional disorder if implemented.

In mid-August 1946, MacCallum drafted an official reply to the British high commissioner to Canada using her working papers. The high commissioner received her reply from the acting undersecretary without revision or modification; it was also used shortly thereafter by Canada's acting high commissioner to Britain.

=== Foreign Service Officer role and additional UN work ===
Following her years authoring memos and acting as an unofficial informant to the Canadian Prime Minister, MacCallum was appointed to the position of Foreign Service Officer in 1947. As the official department expert on Middle East affairs and UN special advisor on Palestine, she represented Canadian interest in a series of British conferences that were intended to settle the terms of the Palestine Mandate. Her role included prepping memos and advising the committees on preferred outcomes. Her recommendations were based on reserving a national homeland for the Jewish community without displacing or disrupting pre-established Arab communities on the land.

During the second session of the UN General Assembly in 1947, the Ad Hoc Political Committee was instated to continue towards a settlement of the Palestine Mandate. MacCallum acted as an advisor to the Canadian representative within this committee, emphasizing a belief that Palestine was not the only option for resettling Jewish refugees, and strongly urging against the UNSCOP majority agreement in favor of partitioning the land.

MacCallum worked directly with the Prime Minister towards addressing concern that using the land as a landing for refugees would antagonize the Arab communities already inhabiting the land, causing unnecessary tensions for all parties involved. She drafted a memo recommending a path wherein Palestine would be placed under trusteeship by the UN instead. Ultimately, her recommendations were not implemented by the committee, and the UN Partition Plan for Palestine advanced forth, eventually being passed as a resolution in November of that year.

== Retirement ==
Following her work in the Department of External Affairs, MacCallum floated between different international posts as a representative of Canada. She was briefly stationed in Athens in 1951 to alleviate the absence of an ambassador, as well as in Beirut in 1954 as chargé d’affaires. She spent her final working years in Turkey, where she participated in community development, hospice care, and aiding those with hearing loss. MacCallum retired in 1977.

== Death and legacy ==
MacCallum died on June 12, 1985. Though she never was given the title of ambassador, she was the first woman to lead an official foreign post as a representative of Canada, and was awarded an honorary doctorate in Law by Queen's University in 1952. In 1967, MacCallum was appointed an Officer of the Order of Canada, which is the highest civilian honor granted for recognition of one's service for the country.
