= Stewart Wheeler =

Canadian diplomat

Stewart Wheeler is a Canadian diplomat, and served as Chief of Protocol of Canada until September 2023.

== Education ==
Wheeler graduated from Trent University in 1992 and attended Universidad de Granada in Spain

== Career ==
He began his career in the public service in 1993, working in the Public Information Office at the House of Commons. In 1994, he joined External Affairs and International Trade Canada. He served abroad in Washington, D.C., as second secretary, covering congressional relations and energy trade policy; Bogotá, as political counsellor; London, as head of the public affairs team at High Commission; and Kabul, as political program manager at the Canadian embassy in Afghanistan (2010 to 2011). He also served as parliamentary relations officer, departmental spokesperson in the Press Office, deputy director of Mexico Relations, deputy director of corporate and internal communications, and, director of Cabinet relations.

He earned the Minister's Award for Foreign Policy Excellence as a member of a Canadian foreign ministry task force set up during the conflict in Kosovo in 1999.

From 1999 to 2004, Wheeler served as press secretary to the Governor General of Canada, Adrienne Clarkson, and in that capacity accompanied her on her State Visit to Iceland in 2003.

He was awarded the Queen Elizabeth II Golden Jubilee Medal in 2002.

From 2012 to 2016, he served as Canadian Ambassador to Iceland.

From July 2016 to December 2018, he served in the Ontario Public Service as the Assistant Deputy Minister of International Relations and Chief of Protocol in the Cabinet Office – Ministry of Intergovernmental Affairs.

He was appointed Chief of Protocol of Canada in January 2019.

He served as the Deputy High Commissioner in India after Chief of Protocol.

He currently serves as Canada's ambassador to Argentina.

Diplomatic posts
Preceded by Alan Bones	Ambassador to the Republic of Iceland; 2012-2016	Succeeded by Anne-Tamara Lorre
