= Julie Loranger =

Canadian lawyer and former ambassador

Julie Loranger (born 1937) is a Canadian lawyer and former Ambassador to Spain and to Cuba (1992–1993).

== Early life and education ==
Born in 1937 in Montreal, Quebec, Loranger hails from a family of lawyers. She earned a civil law degree from the McGill University Faculty of Law in 1959, where she described being one of the few women in her class: "The fellows laughed at us all year but stopped at the end when we came out with the top marks." Shortly after she was admitted to the Bar of Quebec, in 1960, she sailed to France to continue her academic pursuits. She earned a BA from the University of Paris, an MA in international law from Institut des Hautes Etudes Internationales, and a doctorate in the philosophy of education from the University of Navarra in Spain.

== Career ==
Loranger said that after returning from her studies in Europe in 1965, she felt Quebec was experiencing a "cultural revolution" and therefore "felt it very important that I play a role in the social change", and so she was led to join the Department of Education to work on education legislation. Later at the Privy Council Office in Ottawa, she worked with the constitutional review team. When she started working with External Affairs in 1972 as a desk officer in the United States relations office, Loranger's work focused on the boundary waters from the Columbia River to the Great Lakes. At the time, trans-border bridges were an issue and Loranger earned the nickname "Miss Bridges." After a stint in the Department of Communications, in 1976, she became co-ordinator of the Office of the Status of Women, recently established as a "follow-up" to the government's activities for International Women's Year. Independent from the Privy Council Office, it reported directed to Marc Lalonde, the Minister responsible for the Status of Women, and Loranger's position was equivalent to deputy minister.

Maureen O'Neil replaced her at the Office of the Status of Women in 1978 after Loranger became Canada's second consul general to Strasbourg, a post she would hold for four years. The Toronto Star wrote that Loranger had kept her work at the Office of the Status of Women low profile and the office free of controversy, leaving a "trail of muffled criticism". She also served with the Canadian delegation to the United Nations in various capacities including in 1977, 1979, and 1981. By 1984, she was again working in External Affairs, then as director of Western European affairs. She later served as the Ambassador to Spain in the 1980s and to Cuba from 1992 to 1993, when she announced her retirement.
