= Morley Byron Bursey =

Morley Byron Bursey (January 1, 1912 – April 21, 2013) was a Canadian diplomat. Born in the Dominion of Newfoundland, he attended McGill University and was involved in the fish-exporting business prior to joining the Commission of Government in 1938. He served abroad until Newfoundland joined the Canadian Federation in 1949. He remained involved in the Canadian foreign service and was posted to several international positions, most notably as Chargé d'Affaires a.i. to the Dominican Republic from 1955 through 1957. He retired from government work in 1976, but then spent many years as the Executive Director of the Automotive Parts Manufacturers' Association and helped develop the automotive section of the North American Free Trade Agreement. He died in April 2013 at the age of 101.

== Early life ==
Bursey was born on January 1, 1912, in Old Perlican, Newfoundland and Labrador (then the Dominion of Newfoundland), the son of William James and Lillian Bursey (née Hudson). After receiving his primary education in St. John's, he attended McGill University, where he was a member of their McGill Redmen hockey team. He graduated in 1932 with a degree in commerce. His first job out of university was with the Aluminum Company of Canada, and he later took up an executive position with a fish-exporting business.

== Career ==
Bursey began working for Newfoundland's Commission of Government in 1938, beginning with a post in Jamaica as a Fisheries Board trade representative. In May 1943 he came back to Newfoundland, remained involved with the Fisheries Board, and served as a representative for Britain at the Allied Food Commission. In 1946 was sent to New York City in the role of Trade Commissioner. When Newfoundland joined the Canadian Federation in 1949, he became a member the Canadian foreign service and held numerous postings around the world, most notably as Chargé d'Affaires a.i. to the Dominican Republic from November 9, 1955, through October 26, 1957. After the Dominican Republic, he was sent to Accra, Ghana, where he held a position as a commercial counsellor. He was transferred to Oslo, Norway in 1959, Buenos Aires, Argentina in 1963, Athens, Greece in 1967, and Stockholm, Sweden in 1969 to perform similar roles. He returned to the United States in 1971 as a senior trade commissioner in Chicago. One year later, his post shifted to Detroit.

== Later life ==
After his retirement from the government in 1976, Bursey took up a role as a representative for Canada's automotive industry by becoming executive director of the Automotive Parts Manufacturers' Association. Among his contributions in this role, he was "heavily involved" in the development of the automotive portion of the North American Free Trade Agreement. He retired a second time in 1990, but remained active as an honorary director of the organization. He turned 100 in January 2012 and died on April 21, 2013, in St. John's at the age of 101.

Diplomatic posts
Preceded by Harry Albert Scott	Chargé d'Affaires a.i. to the Dominican Republic; 1955–1957	Succeeded by Hector Allard
