= Allan Cunningham Anderson =

Canadian newspaperman and diplomat

Allan Cunningham Anderson (August 1896 – 16 April 1986) was a Scottish-born Canadian newspaperman and diplomat. In 1959, he was appointed Ambassador Extraordinary and Plenipotentiary to Cuba and Haiti.

Anderson was born in Scotland, emigrating to Canada in 1912. He died in Calgary on 16 April 1986 at the age of 89.

Diplomatic posts
Preceded by Hector Allard	Ambassador Extraordinary and Plenipotentiary to Cuba; 1959–1961	Succeeded by George Pirkis Kidd
Preceded by Fulgence Charpentier	Ambassador Extraordinary and Plenipotentiary to Haiti; 1959–1961	Succeeded by Jacques Edmond Brossard
