= Jacques Roy (diplomat) =

Canadian diplomat (1934–2024)

Jacques Roy (9 December 1934 – 2 October 2024) was a Canadian lawyer and diplomat.

== Early life and education ==
Born in Sainte-Anne-des-Monts, Québec, Roy studied at Laval University, where he obtained a B.A. in 1955 and an LL.L. in 1958. He was admitted to the Bar of Quebec in 1959. He then attended the London School of Economics and returned to Canada in 1960 to work for the Department of External Affairs.

== Career ==
Between 1962 and 1975, he worked overseas holding various positions in Canadian delegations and embassies in Czechoslovakia, Cuba, Belgium and at the NATO headquarters in Brussels, Belgium.

Roy held four ambassador positions during his career. From 1981 to 1982, he was ambassador to Saudi Arabia (where he was also accredited to the neighboring Oman, Somalia, North Yemen and South Yemen). From 1982 to 1986, Roy occupied important diplomatic positions in Washington, D.C. He was named ambassador to Switzerland in 1990 and left in 1994 to become Ambassador of Canada to the European Union, a post he held until 1996. He then became Ambassador of Canada to France from 1996 to 2000.

In Canada, Roy held various posts in the Department of External Affairs (which was renamed the Department of Foreign Affairs and International Trade in 1993) and notably served in the Privy Council Office as assistant secretary to the Cabinet for foreign and defence policy.

Roy received the Chevalier de la Légion d'honneur award in 2005.

In 2009, Roy was one of 23 former ambassadors of Canada to sign an open letter to protest what they perceived as unfair treatment of Richard Colvin.
