= William Edward Bauer =

Canadian diplomat (1926–2023)

William Edward Bauer (23 May 1926 – 1 August 2023) was a Canadian diplomat. He was concurrently appointed Ambassador Extraordinary and Plenipotentiary to Laos and Thailand then Myanmar. He was later appointed ambassador to Korea.

== Education ==
Bauer graduated from Queen's University, Kingston, Ontario with an Honours B.A. in Political Science and Philosophy and an M.A. in International Relations and Public Administration.

== Early career ==
Bauer joined the Canadian foreign service in 1952, and after a year in the Far Eastern Division, was posted to Warsaw, Poland in 1953. During the next two years, he was in charge of the political section of the Embassy, and was chargé d'affaires during various periods.

In 1955, he was assigned to Hanoi, as political advisor to the Canadian Commissioner to the International Commission for Supervision and Control in Vietnam, which had been established by the 1954 Geneva Conference to supervise the Cease-Fire Agreement between the French High Command and the People's Army of Vietnam. After two tours of duty in Hanoi, he returned in 1957 to Ottawa, where he was in charge of the Indochina section of the Far Eastern Division until 1959, when he was posted to Rome, where he was Consul of Canada, and also responsible for reporting on Italian political affairs.

Following two years in Rome, Bauer was transferred to Geneva, to act as political advisor on the Canadian delegation to the 14-nation International Conference on the Settlement of the Laotian Question, which had been convened in order to resolve the crisis which had arisen in Southeast Asia. From 1962 to 1964, following the conclusion of the Laos conference, he was a member of Canada's Permanent Delegation to the European Office of the United Nations, with special responsibility for the World Health Organization, the International Labour Office, the World Meteorological Organization, and the Intergovernmental Committee for European Migration.

He returned to Ottawa in 1964, and was again responsible for Indochina affairs at headquarters, with special responsibility for Cambodia and Laos. In 1965, Bauer initiated the organization of the Canadian diplomatic service into the Professional Association of Foreign Service Officers, and was elected as the first president of that organization, which then negotiated its first collective agreement with the government. During the 1966-67 academic year, he taught a course in Asian politics at Carleton University. In 1967, he was assigned to the Canadian Embassy in Washington, where his primary responsibilities related to Vietnam, Laos, and Cambodia, Eastern Europe, and United States domestic affairs.

In 1970, Bauer was appointed director of Staff Relations and Compensation at headquarters, and in 1972 attended the University of Alberta's Banff School of Advanced Management, where he was elected class president. In 1974, he became Director of Pacific Division, dealing with Canada's relations with Japan, Korea, Australia, New Zealand, and the member countries of the Association of Southeast Asian Nations (ASEAN).

In 1975, he was appointed ambassador to Thailand, and concurrently ambassador to Burma and to Laos. During this assignment, because there were no longer Canadian missions in Vietnam and Cambodia, he was also responsible for following developments in those countries, and was heavily involved in Canada's Indochina refugee programme. He travelled extensively throughout the region, and was involved in a wide range of aid projects. He was a member of the Board of Directors of the Asian Institute of Technology from 1975 to 1979.

After four years in Southeast Asia, he returned to Ottawa in 1979 where, as coordinator of Energy Studies during the oil crisis, he dealt with the relationship between Canadian foreign policy and energy policy.

Bauer assumed his duties as Ambassador to the Republic of Korea in February 1981. He remained in Seoul until July 1984, when he returned to Canada to carry out a special project in the field of Federal-Provincial Relations. During the 1984-85 term, he was a Foreign Service Visitor at Carleton University, where he lectured on a variety of subjects, conducted seminars, and carried on research.

In 1985, the Canadian Government appointed Bauer as Co-ordinator and Ambassador-at-Large to the Conference on Security and Co-operation in Europe (CSCE), the precursor of the OSCE. In addition to his overall responsibilities for CSCE activities, he headed the Canadian Delegation to the CSCE Human Contacts Expert Meeting in Berne (April/May 1986). In September 1986, he became Head of the Canadian Delegation to the Vienna Follow-up Meeting of the CSCE, which concluded in January 1989.

In March 1989, Bauer returned to Ottawa to resume his work as head of the Office of CSCE Affairs and as Ambassador-at-Large for the CSCE. He led the Canadian delegations to the CSCE London Information Forum (April/May 1989) and the CSCE Conference on the Human Dimension in Paris (May/June 1989).

Bauer left the foreign service in the fall of 1989, to work as a writer and commentator on current affairs.

== Later career ==
In August 1990, he was appointed to the Immigration and Refugee Board, where he was a Member in the Convention Refugee Determination Division, in Toronto. He heard hundreds of refugee claims, and added to his knowledge of human rights and refugee law, as well as human rights problems throughout the world. Following his second term on the Board, he left in March 1994, and resumed writing and research in the field of foreign affairs and immigration. He has appeared on a number of TV and radio programmes, testified before parliamentary committees, and was writing a book on the refugee determination system in Canada and its relationship to human rights, security, immigration and world migration trends.

== Death ==
William Edward Bauer died on August 1, 2023, at the age of 97.

Diplomatic posts
Preceded by Godfrey Lewis Hearn	Ambassador Extraordinary and Plenipotentiary to the Laos; 1975–1979	Succeeded by M. Fred Bild
Preceded by Godfrey Lewis Hearn	Ambassador Extraordinary and Plenipotentiary to Thailand; 1975–1979	Succeeded by M. Fred Bild
Preceded by David Stansfield	Ambassador Extraordinary and Plenipotentiary to Myanmar; 1976–1979	Succeeded by M. Fred Bild
Preceded by Derek Hudson Burney	Ambassador Extraordinary and Plenipotentiary to Korea; 1981–1984	Succeeded by Donald Wilfred Campbell
