= Marion Adams Macpherson =

Canadian diplomat

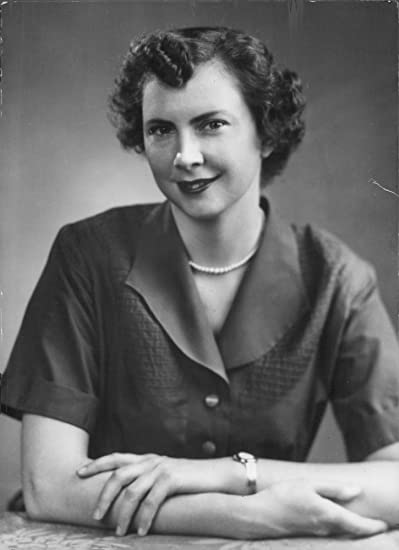
Marion Adams Macpherson Portrait

Marion Macpherson (May 16, 1924 – October 30, 1998) was a Canadian diplomat.

== Early life ==
MacPherson was the first child of Penelope (Annie) Adams and John MacPherson and grew up in Moosomin, Saskatchewan. Her father was a second-generation Scottish Canadian whose parents left their home in the Outer Hebrides (South Uist, Northern Isles) to settle in the Moosomin area of south east Saskatchewan. Her mother was from the same Hebridean region but had attended the University of Glasgow, from which she received a Master of Arts degree in the early 20th century before continuing on to a teaching career. Marion had two younger siblings: Joanne MacPherson of Regina and CWE MacPherson, the Managing and Associate Editor of the Ottawa Citizen.

== Education and career ==
After studies at the University of Saskatchewan (B.A.) and the University of Toronto (M.A.), Macpherson joined the Department of External Affairs of the Government of Canada. Initially, she worked in Washington, D.C., Ottawa and New York City before accepting a post as Third Secretary to the Canadian Permanent Mission to the United Nations from 1963–1968, High Commissioner to Sri Lanka from 1973 to 1976, Ambassador to Denmark from 1979 to 1983, Deputy Commandant of the National Defense College from 1983 to 1985, and High Commissioner to Zambia from 1985 to 1987. Macpherson retired in Ottawa, where she died in 1998. She was only the third woman in Canada to hold the post of Ambassador (High Commissioner) at the time of her appointment as High Commissioner to Sri Lanka in 1973, and the first to do so as a career diplomat. She was among the first women to take the examination for the Canadian foreign service, in the mid- to late- 1940s, and the first woman to pass and gain entrance to External Affairs on the basis of merit. She was a lifelong learner who continued to study piano and Spanish into her 60s. Of all the countries she lived in or visited, Spain remained one of her fondest; she once said that the greatest moment in her professional life was the day democracy was re-established in Spain.

Diplomatic posts
Preceded by Norman Berlis	Ambassador Extraordinary and Plenipotentiary to Denmark; 1979-1983	Succeeded by Erik Benkestock Wang
