= Kenneth Sunquist =

Canadian diplomat

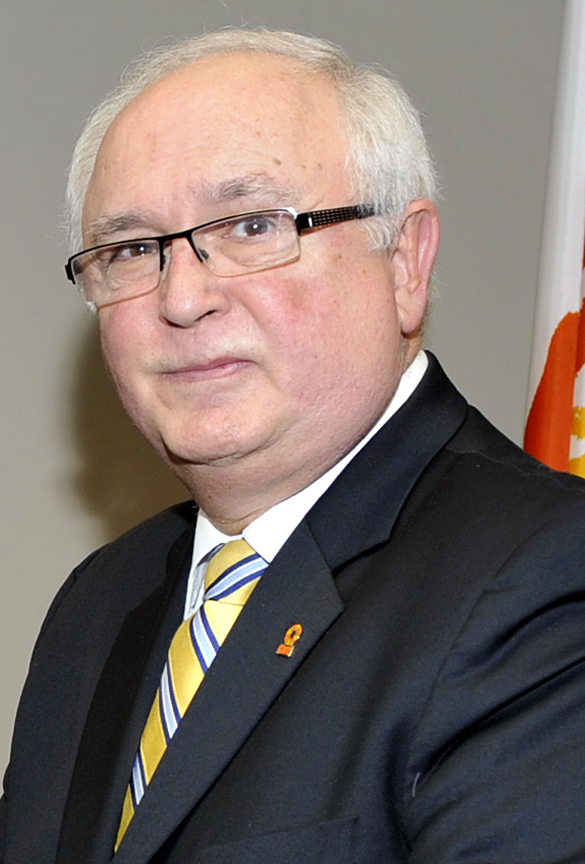
Sunquist in 2013

Kenneth Sunquist is a Canadian diplomat. He was the Assistant Deputy Minister of the Global Operations Branch and Chief Trade Commissioner at Foreign Affairs and International Trade Canada. Sunquist previously served as the Canadian ambassador to Indonesia. He was born in Regina, Saskatchewan, and graduated from the University of Saskatchewan in 1970 with a bachelor's degree in business administration. Sunquist is on the board of directors of the Canadian Commercial Corporation, and serves on its Human Resources Board Committee.

== Foreign assignments ==
- Jakarta, Indonesia
- Beijing, China
- Seoul, South Korea.
- Belgrade, Serbia
- San Francisco, United States
- Kingston, Jamaica

== Domestic assignments ==
- Assistant Deputy Minister, Global Operations Branch & Chief Trade Commissioner
- Assistant Deputy Minister, World Markets Branch
- Assistant Deputy Minister, International Business and Chief Trade Commissioner
- Director General, Trade Commissioner Service Operations and Services
- Co-ordinator of the Trade Development Policy Secretariat
- Director of the Trade Development Liaison and Special Projects Division
- Acting Director General of the Trade Communications Bureau
