= Robert W. Peck =

Canadian diplomat

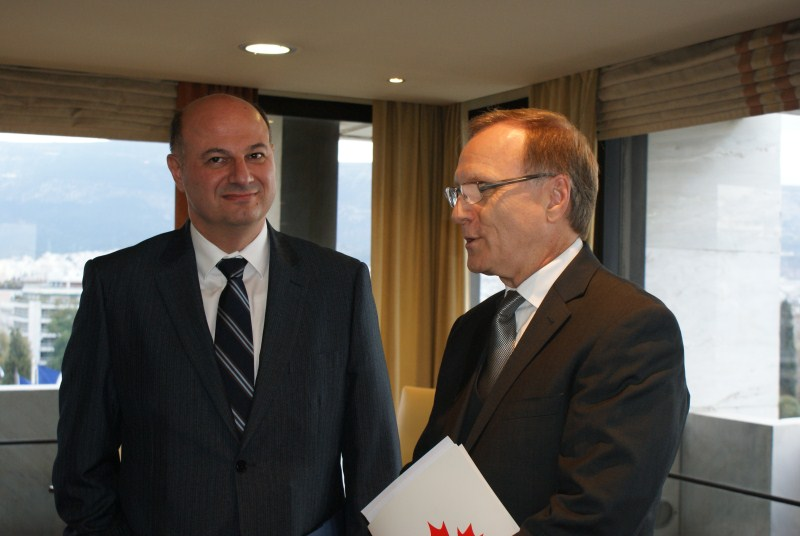
Robert Peck (right) with deputy Foreign Minister of Greece Konstantinos Tsiaras

Robert William Peck is Canada's former Ambassador Extraordinary and Plenipotentiary to Algeria. He is serving as Canada's chief of protocol.

== Biography ==
August 9, 2004 he appointed Canada's Ambassador to the People's Democratic Republic of Algeria, where he served until October 2007.

From October 2007 to December 2010 he was Chief of Protocol of Canada Foreign Affairs and International Trade Canada.

From October 2011 to October 2015 he served Ambassador of Canada to the Hellenic Republic and High Commissioner to the Republic of Cyprus Foreign Affairs, Trade and Development Canada.

Since November 2015 he served Senior Advisor, EX Career Transition & former Head of Mission/mentor in residence Global Affairs Canada.

Preceded by Richard Belliveau	Canadian Ambassador to Algeria; 2004–2007	Succeeded by Patrick Parisot
