= Pamela Ann McDougall =

Pamela Ann McDougall (9 May 1925 – 4 October 2015) was a Canadian diplomat.

McDougall attended Glebe Collegiate in Ottawa and went on to earn a Bachelor of Science degree in chemistry from Mount Allison University and a graduate degree from the University of Toronto. McDougall elected not to pursue a career in chemistry, accepting, instead, a position as a grade 3 clerk in the Department of External Affairs. McDougall rose through the ranks of the department, becoming a grade 1 foreign service officer in 1952.

In 1958 and 1959 McDougall represented Canada on the trilateral International Control Commission for Vietnam (the other members being India and Poland). Her rapport with these two countries served her well in her subsequent appointments. Between 1961 and 1963 she served as first secretary and later counselor at the Canadian High Commission in India. In 1968, she was appointed ambassador to Poland, becoming the second Canadian woman to serve as an ambassador. Her tenure in Warsaw coincided with a number of crises in the Middle East, including the Six Day War and crises in the Eastern Bloc, including the Warsaw Pact invasion of Czechoslovakia.

McDougall returned to Ottawa in 1971, joining the Privy Council as an assistant secretary. In 1974, she returned to External Affairs as a bureau director general. She then served as Chair of the Tariff Board from 1976 to 1979. In 1979 she was appointed deputy minister the Department of National Health and Welfare by Prime Minister Joe Clark.

In 1980, McDougall reached the peak of her career in the civil service when Prime Minister Pierre Trudeau picked her to lead the Royal Commission on Conditions of Foreign Service. Trudeau specifically directed McDougall to consider "the aspirations of women in Canadian society". In writing her report, McDougall traveled around the world and interviewed sixty percent of the Canadian foreign service and their spouses.

After presenting her report in 1981, McDougall retired from public service. She served for some years on the boards of Carleton University and the Royal Ottawa Hospital. In 1987, she married Paul Mayer, a retired Lieutenant Colonel whom she had met in Vietnam three decades earlier.

Diplomatic posts
Preceded by Norman Berlis	Ambassador Extraordinary and Plenipotentiary to Poland; 1968-1971	Succeeded by John Alexander McCordick
