= Hector Allard =

Canadian diplomat

Marie Joseph Hector Allard (May 11, 1902 – March 24, 1984) was a Canadian diplomat. He was the Permanent Delegate to the United Nations and in 1957, appointed Ambassador Extraordinary and Plenipotentiary to Cuba, Dominican Republic, and Haiti, and in 1960, Ambassador Extraordinary and Plenipotentiary to Denmark.

He was born in St. Laurent, Manitoba and was a Rhodes Scholar at Oxford University.

== Sources ==
- "Highlighted in the News". Lethbridge Herald. January 4, 1954.
- The Canadian Who's who. (1983)

Diplomatic posts
Preceded by Bruce MacGillivray Williams	Permanent Delegate to the United Nations (Geneva); 1953–1957	Succeeded by Max Hirsch Wershof
Preceded by Harry Albert Scott	Ambassador Extraordinary and Plenipotentiary to Cuba; 1957–1959	Succeeded by Allan Cunningham Anderson
Preceded by Morley Byron Bursey	Ambassador Extraordinary and Plenipotentiary to Dominican Republic; 1957–1959	Succeeded by Wilfrid Bertram McCullough
Preceded by Harry Albert Scott	Ambassador Extraordinary and Plenipotentiary to Haiti; 1957–1959	Succeeded by Fulgence Charpentier
Preceded by John Benjamin Clark Watkins	Ambassador Extraordinary and Plenipotentiary to Denmark; 1960–1967	Succeeded by Max Hirsch Wershof
