= John Alan Beesley =

Canadian diplomat and civil servant

John Alan Beesley OC QC
- Born: August 17, 1927; Smithers, British Columbia, Canada
- Died: January 22, 2009 (aged 81); Victoria, British Columbia, Canada
- Education: University of British Columbia
- Occupations: Lawyer; civil servant; diplomat
- Spouses: Margaret Stevens (m. 1954; died 1991); Ruth Lechner (m. 2002)

John Alan Beesley OC QC (1927–2009) was a Canadian diplomat and civil servant.

== Early life ==
Beesley was born in Smithers, British Columbia, on August 17, 1927. He was one of five children of Jack and Margaret Beesley. He had two brothers, Dr. Bernard Beesley and Flight Officer Terry Beesley (who died on D-Day). He had two sisters, Noreen Burvill and Elizabeth Beesley.

He spent his early years in Williams Lake, Penticton and Kamloops. He graduated from Kamloops High School in 1945.

He attended the University of British Columbia, graduating with a Bachelor of Arts and Law degree in 1950. While attending UBC he was a founding member of the Jokers Club. He also became a member of the Sigma Chi fraternity.

After graduating, Beesley practised law at Crease and Company in Victoria, BC, for six years, prior to joining the federal Department of External Affairs in 1956.

== Diplomatic career ==
Beesley began work with the Department of External Affairs in 1956. His early postings included Israel in 1958 and the Canadian permanent mission to the United Nations Geneva, from 1964 to 1967. He was assistant under-secretary and legal adviser to External Affairs from 1972 to 1973 and the Canadian delegate to the legal committee of the Stockholm Environmental Conference in 1972.

Beesley received his first ambassadorial appointment in 1973. He was made ambassador to Austria, the International Atomic Energy Agency and UNIDO from 1973 to 1976. He served as High Commissioner to Australia from 1977 to 1980. From 1980 to 1982 he was Canada's first ambassador for disarmament in New York. From 1983 to 1987 he was ambassador to the United Nations in Geneva and GATT. Beesley was a member of the International Law Commission from 1986 to 1991.

From 1967 to 1983, Beesley was instrumental in shaping the law of the sea as Canada's ambassador to the Law of the Sea Conference, Canadian head of delegation and chair of the conference drafting committee.

In 1987 to 1988, he took a years sabbatical as a visiting professor at the UBC faculty of law. He ended his diplomatic career as ambassador for marine conservation and special environmental adviser to Canada's Foreign Minister from 1989 to 1991.

Throughout his career Beesley was involved in protecting the environment and promoting peace. He was involved in major bilateral and multinational treaty negotiations in many subjects, including: outer space; the law of the atmosphere; aerial hijacking; international trade; the International Atomic Energy Agency peaceful nuclear regime; environmental law; human rights law; the law of the arctic; humanitarian law; laws of war; climate change; aboriginal law; refugee law; and international crimes.

Beesley was also an active human rights advocate in the World Health Organization (on apartheid) and led the delegation that negotiated the anti-hijacking agreement with Cuba.

== Other ==
Beesley was on the board of directors of the Sierra Legal Defence Fund.

== Awards and recognition ==
Beesley was made a Queen's Counsel in 1974. In about 1978 he was recognized as a Significant Sig by the Sigma Chi fraternity.

Beesley was awarded the Prime Minister's Outstanding Public Service Award in 1983. In 1983 he was made an officer of the Order of Canada for his work on the law of the sea and the environment.

In 1993, Beesley was awarded the Admiral's Medal for contributions to Canadian maritime affairs. In 1995, he received the United Nations Association in Canada medal of honour. In 1998 he was awarded the Red Cross's Human Rights Medal of Honour, the Freie und Hansestadt Hamburg Medal, and the Human Rights Medal of Honour from the Vancouver Island Human Rights Coalition.

Beesley received an honorary doctor of environmental studies from the University of Waterloo in 1984 and an honorary doctor of laws from Dalhousie University in 1994.

== Personal life ==
In 1954, Beesley married Margaret Ruth Stevens. They had two children, a daughter, Terry Beesley Phipps, and a son, S. Alan Beesley.

His first wife died in 1991. He remarried in 2002 to Ruth Lechner. He died in Victoria, B.C., on January 22, 2009.

Diplomatic posts
Preceded by Norman Frederick Henderson Berlis	Ambassador Extraordinary and Plenipotentiary to Austria; 1973–1976	Succeeded by Thomas Lemesurier Carter
Preceded by James Joachim McCardle	High Commissioner to Papua New Guinea; 1977–1980	Succeeded by Raymond Cecil Anderson
Preceded by James Joachim McCardle	High Commissioner to Australia; 1977–1980	Succeeded by Raymond Cecil Anderson
Preceded by Established	High Commissioner to the Solomon Islands; 1978–1980	Succeeded by Raymond Cecil Anderson
Preceded by Established	High Commissioner to Vanuatu; 1980–1980	Succeeded by Raymond Cecil Anderson
Preceded by Donald Sutherland McPhail	Ambassador and Permanent Representative to the United Nations (Geneva); 1983–1987	Succeeded by de Montigny Marchand
