= Yves Brodeur =

Canadian diplomat

Yves Brodeur (born 1953) is a Canadian diplomat. He was Ambassador Extraordinary and Plenipotentiary to Turkey and ambassador to Azerbaijan, Turkmenistan and Georgia from August 2005 to October 2007.

In 2011, Brodeur became Canada's permanent representative to the North Atlantic Treaty Organization (NATO).

Diplomatic posts
| Preceded by Michael Leir | Ambassador Extraordinary and Plenipotentiary to Turkey | Succeeded by {{{after}}} |
