= Michael Shenstone =

Canadian diplomat (1928–2019)

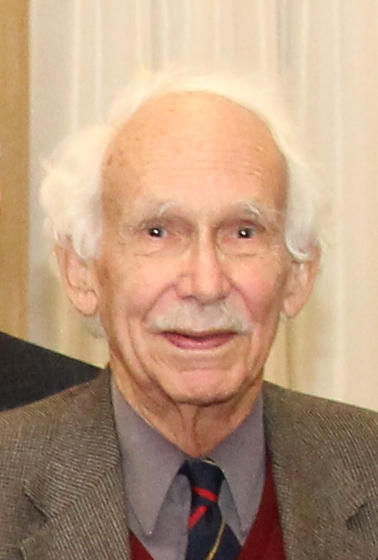
- Shenstone in 2012
- Born: June 25, 1928; Toronto, Ontario, Canada
- Died: September 9, 2019 (aged 91); Toronto, Ontario
- Occupation: Diplomat
- Known for: Playing a role in the rescue of American diplomats in Iran

Michael Shenstone (June 25, 1928 – September 9, 2019) was a Canadian diplomat.

He served in a variety of senior diplomatic posts, including as Canada′s ambassador to Saudi Arabia; Canada′s ambassador to Austria; Canada′s representative to NATO - Warsaw Pact disarmament negotiations, and was the Department of Foreign Affairs director-general of African and Middle Eastern Affairs. He also played a role in the rescue of six American diplomats who managed to evade being taken hostage during the 1979 Iranian revolution.

In 1981, when he was an assistant under-secretary of state for external affairs, the Calgary Herald called him a bruised defender of Canadian Middle East Policy, quoting him from a conference on the Middle East.

Israel and its partisans refuse to recognize or to feel in their bones the appalling historical experience of the Palestinian people, one of the tragedies of our time, especially since they too are a dispossessed people. Or perhaps they don't want to feel it. ... It is also regrettable that many Arabs don't recognize the appalling weight of history for the Jewish people, centuries of persecution, not just the holocaust, that generates an understandable obsession with the security of their state.

In July 1986, Shenstone′s attendance at Kurt Waldheim′s inauguration as President of Austria, stirred controversy. An editorial in the Ottawa Citizen reminded readers that Canada followed the British model of diplomatic relations, and ″Unlike the U.S., we do not use such events to express our approval or disapproval of the person or government concerned.″

On November 15, 2012, Shenstone and American diplomat Robert Anders, compared their experiences with events of the ″Canadian caper″, with how those events were portrayed in the recent feature film Argo.

Shenstone died peacefully at Sunnybrook Health Sciences Centre in Toronto on September 9, 2019.
