= Ross Campbell (diplomat) =

Canadian diplomat

Ross Campbell, OC, DSC (November 4, 1918 – August 15, 2007) was a Canadian lawyer, soldier and diplomat Campbell held diplomatic posts throughout the world including Norway, Denmark, and Turkey, and served as Canada's Ambassador to Yugoslavia, Algeria, Korea, and Japan. Between 1967 and 1972, Campbell served as ambassador to NATO. Upon finishing diplomatic service Campbell was appointed chairman of Atomic Energy of Canada Limited.

== Education and Second World War ==
Campbell studied Law at the University of Toronto, upon graduation he volunteered for military service. He served with the Royal Canadian Navy from 1940 to 1945. He was awarded the Distinguished Service Cross by King George VI in 1944 for his work in Motor Torpedo Boats. During his tour of duty Campbell took park in two North African invasions and others in Italy, Greece and Normandy. Campbell ended the war as a lieutenant commander. Soon after the end of the Second World War Campbell married Penelope "Pippa" Grantham-Hill in England.

== Foreign Service ==
Campbell began his career with External Affairs with postings in Norway, Denmark, and Turkey. During postings in Ottawa he served as a special assistant, the head of the Middle East division, and the assistant under-secretary of state for External Affairs. He was a member of the Canadian delegation to the General Assembly during the Suez Crisis in 1956. Campbell was appointed as Canada's first Ambassador to Yugoslavia, concurrently being accredited as Ambassador to Algeria while residing in Yugoslavia.

In 1967 Campbell was appointed as the Canadian ambassador to NATO. As part of his appointment he served as a Canada's representative on NATO's Nuclear Planning Group. He was known as a blunt-spoken diplomat who believed in the Cold War realities of NATO. This came at a time when the Liberal cabinet led by Pierre Trudeau questioned the value of NATO and contemplated revoking membership within the alliance. Campbell was firm in his view that without NATO, the Soviet Union would have opportunity to overthrow the countries of Western Europe. Campbell held that NATO existed to preserve European territorial integrity, security, and social and economic well-being. Further, Campbell argued that NATO acted as Canada's admission card to the negotiating tables of the Western Alliance. After his NATO assignment ended in 1972, Campbell was appointed as the ambassador to Japan.

== Post Foreign Service ==
Upon his retirement from Canadian diplomatic corps, Campbell was appointed chairman of Atomic Energy of Canada Limited. His appointment came at a time when charges were being laid against the company for corruption. Campbell's primary responsibility with Atomic Energy of Canada Limited was to sell CANDU reactor's to foreign governments. Upon finishing work with AECL Campbell in 1983 founded, and became a partner of InterCon Consultants along with retired General Frederick Ralph Sharp. Despite his retirement from government Campbell remained outspoken over his views of NATO. In 2007, he was made an Officer of the Order of Canada OC.

== Archives ==
There is a Ross Campbell fond at Library and Archives Canada. The archival reference number is R13629. The fond covers the date ranges 1945 to 2007. It consists of 4.19 meters of textual records, 365 photographs and 1 medal.
