= Patrick Parisot =

Canadian diplomat

Patrick Parisot was a former Canadian diplomat. He was Ambassador Extraordinary and Plenipotentiary to Norway, Cuba, Algeria, Portugal and previously to Chile.

In 2010, Parisot resigned as Ambassador to Algeria to become Principal Secretary to then-Liberal Leader Michael Ignatieff.

Parisot is a former Special Policy Advisor and Press Secretary for then-Prime Minister Jean Chrétien .

A graduate of UdeM, UQAM, Parisot was as a broadcaster with Radio-Canada and TQS.

Diplomatic posts
Preceded by Robert W. Peck	Ambassador to the People’s Democratic Republic of Algeria; 2007–2010	Succeeded by Chargé d'Affaires a.i. André Dubois
Preceded by Robert Vanderloo	Ambassador Extraordinary to Portugal; 2003–2007	Succeeded by Anne-Marie Bourcier
Preceded by Paul D. Durand	Ambassador Extraordinary and Plenipotentiary to Chile; 2001–2003	Succeeded by Bernard Giroux
