= Robert Bradford Edmonds =

Canadian diplomat

Robert Bradford Edmonds (May 8, 1928 – March 4, 2007) was a Canadian diplomat active from the early 1950s to the late 1980s.

== Education ==
Raised in China by missionary parents, Edmonds was educated at the West China School and University of Toronto Schools. He earned degrees from Victoria University, Toronto and Harvard University, Edmonds spoke fluent English, French and Mandarin Chinese.

== Career ==
His postings included Indonesia, New Zealand, the International Control Commission in Laos (for which he was later awarded Canada's International Peacekeeping Service medal), Sweden, Hungary, the Headquarters of the United Nations, the Vatican City and Italy. Edmonds was part of the early negotiations between Canada and the People's Republic of China which led to Canada eventually becoming the first major western country to formally extend diplomatic recognition to the PRC in 1970. In 1972, Edmonds opened Canada's first official embassy to Hungary and served there as head of mission until 1975.

From 1975 to 1979, he served at Canada's Mission to the United Nations working on law of the sea, outer space and other key strategic negotiations. From 1979 to 1983 he was Canada's Minister Plenipotentiary to the Vatican during the early years of Pope John Paul II's pontificate and the Church's increasing interventionist activities in the political workings of Poland, Eastern Europe and Central and South America.

He served as Canadian vice-consul in Indonesia in the 1950s and as Chargé d'affaires in Hungary (1972–75).

== Personal life ==
Edmonds married Shirley Johns in 1955 in Melbourne. The couple had a son Michael and a daughter Meghan. Edmonds died in March 2007 in Toronto, Ontario.
