= Michael Richard Bell =

Canadian former diplomat

Michael Richard Bell (January 1939 – November 2021) was a Canadian diplomat. He was appointed Ambassador Extraordinary and Plenipotentiary to Peru, then to Bolivia and then to Mongolia. Bell was later appointed to Mongolia and to the Union of Soviet Socialist Republics. He was then concurrently appointed to the Netherlands, Tajikistan, Georgia, Kyrgyzstan, Azerbaijan and Belarus.

Diplomatic posts
Preceded by Jean-Yves Grenon	Ambassador Extraordinary and Plenipotentiary to Peru; 1981-	Succeeded by Keith Arthur Bezanson
Preceded by Jean-Yves Grenon	Ambassador Extraordinary and Plenipotentiary to Bolivia; 1982-	Succeeded by Keith Arthur Bezanson
Preceded by Vernon George Turner	Ambassador Extraordinary and Plenipotentiary to Mongolia; 1990-	Succeeded by M. Fred Bild
Preceded by Vernon George Turner	Ambassador Extraordinary and Plenipotentiary to the Union of Soviet Socialist Republics; 1990-1992	Succeeded by dissolution of the Soviet Union
Preceded by Jacques Gilles Bruno Gignac	Ambassador Extraordinary and Plenipotentiary to the Netherlands; 1992-1996	Succeeded by Marie Bernard-Meunier
Preceded by dissolution of the Soviet Union	Ambassador Extraordinary and Plenipotentiary to the Republic of Tajikistan; 1992-1992	Succeeded by Jeremy Kinsman
Preceded by James Bartleman	Ambassador Extraordinary and Plenipotentiary to the Republic of Georgia; 1992-1992	Succeeded by Peter Julian Arthur Hancock
Preceded by dissolution of the Soviet Union	Ambassador Extraordinary and Plenipotentiary to the Republic of Kyrgyzstan; 1992-1992	Succeeded by James Bartleman
Preceded by Jeremy Kinsman	Ambassador Extraordinary and Plenipotentiary to the Republic of Azerbaijan; 1992-1992	Succeeded by Peter Julian Arthur Hancock
Preceded by dissolution of the Soviet Union	Ambassador Extraordinary and Plenipotentiary to Republic of Belarus; 1992-1992	Succeeded by Jeremy Kinsman
