= Sydney David Pierce =

Canadian hurdler and diplomat

- Born: March 30, 1901; Montreal, Quebec, Canada
- Died: May 17, 1992 (aged 91)
- Occupation: diplomat

Sydney David Pierce (March 30, 1901 – May 17, 1992) was a Canadian Olympic hurdler and career diplomat. He was Canada's first Jewish ambassador.

== Life and career ==
Born in Montreal, Quebec, he competed in track and field while attending McGill University and in the 110-metres hurdles at 1924 Summer Olympics in Paris. He received a Bachelor of Arts degree in 1922, a Bachelor of Civil Law degree in 1925 and an honorary Doctorate of Law in 1956. After graduating, he became a reporter for the Montreal Gazette. He then lectured at Dalhousie University in political science and later worked for the Associated Press.

He joined federal Department of Munitions and Supply in 1940 and later became chief of the economic division of the Department of External Affairs. In 1947, he was appointed Canada's ambassador to Mexico. From 1950 to 1951, he was Canada's representative to the OECD. He was also Canada's ambassador to Brazil, Belgium, and Luxembourg. He was Canada's chief negotiator at the "Kennedy" General Agreement on Tariffs and Trade negotiations from 1964 to 1967.

In 2004, he was inducted into the McGill University Sports Hall of Fame.
