= Walter Alexander Riddell =

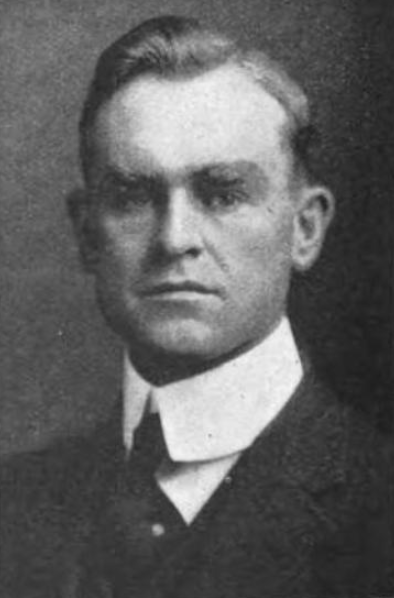
- Born: 5 August 1881; Stratford, Ontario, Canada
- Died: 27 July 1963 (aged 81); Toronto, Ontario, Canada
- Occupation: Diplomat
- Known for: Proposing sanctions against Mussolini

Walter Alexander Riddell (5 August 1881 – 27 July 1963) was a Canadian civil servant, diplomat, and academic. He was the Canadian Advisory Officer to the League of Nations from 1924 to 1937.

Born in Stratford, Ontario, to a single working parent, Riddell was the deputy minister of the Department of Labour for the Government of Ontario. From 1920 to 1925, he was the Canadian delegate to the International Labour Organization in Geneva. From 1924 to 1937, he was the Canadian Advisory Officer to the League of Nations. From 1940 to 1946, he was the Canadian High Commissioner to New Zealand. He later taught International Relations at the University of Toronto.

At the League of Nations, he is responsible for what is known as The Riddell Incident, where he tried, oblivious to the desires of Mackenzie King, to place sanctions on Italy led by Benito Mussolini. The sanctions came to be known in the international press as the Canadian proposal, whereupon the government blanched because they were unready to occupy the centre of the world diplomatic stage, and Mackenzie King feared that sanctions on Italy would offend voters in Quebec, where Mussolini was popular with the right-wing Catholic intelligentsia. He ultimately failed when the Mackenzie King government decided to repudiate the sanctions that he had proposed. The Minister of Justice, Ernest Lapointe, reported to Parliament on 2 December 1935 that:

[Riddell] represented only his personal opinion, and his views as a member of the committee and not the views of the Canadian government.

Later that month, the Hoare–Laval Pact damaged the image of the League. Mussolini finished the conquest of Ethiopia.

In 1936, King all but declared the death of the League, after Emperor Haile Selassie's plea for help from foreign nations in his 7 June 1936 address to League of Nations.

The British later evicted the Italians during the East African campaign of World War II to protect their position in Egypt.

== Sources ==
- Bothwell, Robert (2 December 2007). "Walter Alexander Riddell". The Canadian Encyclopedia.
- Creighton, Donald (1970). Canada's First Century. Macmillan of Canada.
- Morton, Desmond (1999). A Military History of Canada. McCllelland & Stewart.
- In Defence of Canada: Appeasement and Rearmament, James Eayrs
- Walter Alexander Riddell fonds

Diplomatic posts
Preceded by None	Canadian Advisory Officer to the League of Nations; 1924–1937	Succeeded by Humphrey Hume Wrong
Preceded by None	Canadian High Commissioner to New Zealand; 1940–1946	Succeeded by Alfred Rive
