= Joseph Caron =

Canadian diplomat

Joseph Caron (born 1947) is a Canadian diplomat. He served as the former Canadian high commissioner to India and former Canadian ambassador to China and Japan.

Born and raised in the small francophone agricultural village of Pain Court in South-western Ontario (Canada), Caron attended the University of Ottawa (B.A. Honours Political Science, 1970).

He joined the Canadian Trade Commissioner Service in 1972 and served abroad in Saigon (Vietnam) and Ankara (Turkey). Caron began Japanese language studies in 1975, and subsequently served three times at the Canadian Embassy in Tokyo, including as minister and head of chancery. During the 1980s, he undertook private-sector assignments involving China, Hong Kong, Korea and Taiwan. In Ottawa, he has held several positions related to Asian and international economic affairs, including G7 summitry.

In 1998, he became Assistant Deputy Minister for Asia Pacific and Africa (Canadian Department of Foreign Affairs), and served as Canada's senior official for Asia-Pacific Economic Cooperation.

Caron served as Canada's ambassador to China (2001 to 2005), with concurrent accreditation to North Korea and Mongolia, and was ambassador to Japan until the fall of 2008 when he was appointed High Commissioner to India with concurrent accreditation as Ambassador to Nepal and Bhutan.

In 2008, Caron was awarded an honorary doctorate from the Meiji Gakuin University.

He is married to Kumru Caron and they have three children.

In June 2010, Caron was appointed Distinguished Fellow at the Asia Pacific Foundation of Canada and in July 2010, Caron joined the Institute of Asian Research at The University of British Columbia as an Honorary Professor.

On October 12, 2010, Caron was appointed to the Board of Directors of Manulife Financial, located in Toronto, Ontario.

== Honors ==
- Order of the Rising Sun, 2nd Class, Gold and Silver Star (2017)
