= Anne Leahy =

Anne Leahy is a Canadian educator and former diplomat.

She was born in Quebec City, Quebec and received a BA in economics from Queen's University and a MA in economics from the University of Toronto.

From 1974 to 1976, she was posted to the Mission of Canada to the European Community in Brussels. From 1982 to 1986, she was Counsellor and Representative to the Development Assistance Committee for the Organisation for Economic Co-operation and Development in Paris. From 1989 to 1992, she was ambassador to Cameroon, Chad and the Central African Republic. From 1993 to 1996, she was ambassador to Poland and, from 1996 to 1999, to Russia, Armenia, Uzbekistan and Belarus. Leahy was Federal Coordinator for World Youth Day 2002. From 2004 to 2007, she was ambassador to the Great Lakes Region of Africa. She was co-chair of the Group of Friends of the Great Lakes of the International Conference for Peace, Stability and Development in the Great Lakes Region. From 2008 to 2012, she was Ambassador of Canada to the Holy See in Rome. After retiring, she was named Papal Transition Coordinator for Canada's Department of Foreign Affairs in 2013.

From 1999 to 2000, Leahy was diplomat in residence at York University. In 2002, she became the founding director for the Institut d'études internationales de Montréal at the Université du Québec à Montréal. She is adjunct professor at the School of Religious Studies at McGill University.
