= Jeremy Kinsman =

Canadian diplomat

Jeremy K.B. Kinsman

Canadian Ambassador to the European Union
- In office August 1, 2002 – June 16, 2006
- Prime Minister: Jean Chrétien; Paul Martin; Stephen Harper
- Preceded by: James Bartleman
- Succeeded by: Ross Hornby

Canadian High Commissioner to the United Kingdom
- In office 2000–2002
- Prime Minister: Jean Chrétien
- Preceded by: Roy MacLaren
- Succeeded by: Mel Cappe

Personal details
- Born: January 28, 1942 (age 84) Montreal, Quebec

Jeremy Kenneth Bell Kinsman (born January 28, 1942) is a Canadian former diplomat. He was the Canadian Ambassador to Russia and various former Soviet Republics (Armenia, Belarus, Kyrgyzstan, Kazakhstan, Uzbekistan, Tajikistan) (1992-1996), Ambassador to Italy and Albania and High Commissioner to Malta (1996-2000), High Commissioner to the United Kingdom (2000-2002) and Ambassador to the European Union (2002-2006).

== Life and career ==
Born in Montreal, Quebec, Kinsman graduated from Princeton University in 1963 and the Institut d'études politiques de Paris in 1965. He joined the Department of External Affairs in 1966.Born in Montreal, Quebec, Kinsman graduated from Princeton University in 1963 and the Institut d'études politiques de Paris in 1965. He joined the Department of External Affairs in 1966.

He served abroad in Brussels, Algiers and at the United Nations in New York where he became Minister and Deputy Permanent Representative (1979-1980), and in Washington as Minister (Political) 1981 to 1985. In Ottawa, he was Chairman of Policy Planning, Assistant Deputy Minister (Cultural Affairs and Broadcasting) in the Department of Communications (1985-1989), and Political Director and Assistant Deputy Minister (International Security and Organizations) (1989-1992). He resigned from the Public Service in 2006.In Ottawa, he was Chairman of Policy Planning, Assistant Deputy Minister (Cultural Affairs and Broadcasting) in the Department of Communications (1985–1989), and Political Director and Assistant Deputy Minister (International Security and Organizations) (1989–1992). He left the Canadian foreign service in 2006.

In 2007, he was named Diplomat-in-Residence at the Woodrow Wilson School of Princeton University. The School partnered in the democracy support project Kinsman headed under the Community of Democracies that researched, and produced a field guide for democracy support, "A Diplomat's Handbook for Democracy Development Support", now in a Third Edition, published by CIGI (Centre for International Governance Innovation) in 2013.

In 2009–2010, Kinsman was appointed Regents' Lecturer at the University of California, Berkeley, and joined Berkeley's Institute of Governmental Studies as Resident International Scholar. From 2011 to 2017, he was concurrently Distinguished Diplomatic Visitor at Ryerson University, Toronto. He has been a member of the Foreign Affairs Council of Justin Trudeau.

Kinsman is a regular contributor to print media and TV, notably as lead foreign affairs writer for Policy Magazine. He was co-panelist on the CTV News program "Diplomatic Community" (2017-2023). He is co-host of the Red Passport Podcast. He is a Distinguished Fellow of the Canadian International Council. Kinsman was an independent Director on the Board of Dundee Precious Metals, Inc. (2007-2022).

In 2024, Kinsman was awarded the King Charles III Coronation Medal and was invested as Member of the Order of British Columbia in 2025.

Kinsman lives in British Columbia.
