= John Watkins (diplomat) =

Canadian diplomat (1902–1964)

John Benjamin Clark Watkins (3 December 1902 – 12 October 1964) was a Canadian diplomat and scholar who served as Canadian ambassador to the Soviet Union from 1954 to 1956. Describing Watkins as "sophisticated, erudite and fluent in Russian", Michael Dobbs of The Washington Post wrote that he was the "perfect ambassador" to Moscow. He is credited with organizing a historic meeting between Soviet Premier Nikita Khrushchev and Canadian External Affairs Minister Lester B. Pearson.

== Early life ==
Born in Norval, Ontario, Watkins was the first child of John Watkins and Jane Clark. He had two sisters, Elizabeth and Isabel.

Watkins studied French, German, and Latin at the University of Toronto, and earned a master's degree by 1927. In a trip to Europe in the late 1920s, he was a guide and companion to Heywood Hale Broun in France, Holland, and Denmark. He left Europe for the United States in 1930, where he attended Columbia University and joined the staff of the American-Scandinavian Foundation in New York City. After Columbia, Watkins attended Cornell University in 1942 and earned a PhD there in 1944; his thesis was about the Danish writer Gustav Wied. During World War II, he returned to Canada to teach at Queen's University at Kingston, then Guelph Agricultural College. Watkins became an associate professor of English at the University of Manitoba in 1944. In 1946, Watkins translated the complete works of Honoré de Balzac into English.

Upon an invitation by Humphrey Hume Wrong, Watkins reluctantly agreed to take the Canadian Foreign Service Examination. He was offered a position as a Foreign Service officer and left the University of Manitoba to join the Department of External Affairs (DEA). Watkins rapidly advanced from first secretary of the European Division to head of section to chargé d'affaires in Moscow.

== Diplomatic career ==
=== First post in the Soviet Union: chargé d'affaires ===
On 1 September 1948, Watkins officially replaced John Wendell Holmes as the chargé d'affaires ad interim. He knew some Russian prior to arriving in Moscow, and set himself apart from other Western diplomats in the city by becoming fluent in the language. There, Watkins befriended George Costakis, the long-time head of personnel at the Canadian embassy and collector of Soviet art. While Stalin led the Soviet Union, there was limited opportunity for foreign diplomats like Watkins to travel and interact with Soviet society. Near the end of his post in Moscow, Watkins began to develop health issues – heart and circulatory weaknesses that were not diagnosed at his medical examination upon entering the DEA – that would affect him for the remainder of his life. The DEA announced in January 1951 that he was to return to Ottawa on sick leave, and he was replaced by Robert Ford.

=== Norway ===
By the end of 1951, Watkins was appointed to serve a diplomatic post in Oslo, Norway. Canadian government records list him as envoy to Iceland and Norway from the summer of 1952 to 1954. In February 1954, it was reported that Chester Ronning would replace Watkins as the minister to Norway.

=== Second post in the Soviet Union: ambassador ===
After the death of Joseph Stalin in 1953, Georgy Malenkov expressed a willingness to resolve issues of conflict between the East and the West, and there was an apparent easing of tensions within Canada–Soviet Union relations when Dmitri Chuvakhin was appointed Soviet ambassador to Canada. In response, Watkins was officially made Canada's first peacetime ambassador to the Soviet Union on 1 January 1954. (Note: According to Global Affairs Canada, Watkins officially became the Canadian Ambassador to the Soviet Union on 14 January 1954 and held the post until 15 April 1956.) Watkins found that the Soviet Union was more open under the leadership of First Secretary of the Communist Party of the Soviet Union Nikita Khrushchev, and he had a fondness for befriending Soviet officials and was able to develop a large number of contacts. To his detriment, this would prove costly and allow him to become a target of Soviet espionage.

In the fourth quarter of 1954, Watkins met a young man named Kamahl in a Muslim area of one of the southern republics of the Soviet Union and invited him back to his hotel room. The hotel staff likely observed the pair entering Watkins' room. A few months later, Watkins received a postcard from Kamahl who stated he would be visiting Moscow. Watkins entertained Kamahl in Moscow, and the two men engaged in a brief romantic affair consummated in the younger man's hotel room. As he did with every other encounter, Watkins dutifully reported to Quebec his encounters with Kamahl and described him as a young man who had doubts about the Soviet system. The only thing he failed to report was the homosexual aspect of their relationship. Unbeknownst to Watkins, Kamahl's visit was staged by the KGB and the two men were photographed together in Kamahl's room. The KGB sought to exploit Watkins' indiscretion not by blackmailing him, but rather by manipulating him to become an agent of influence by enveloping him in a "debt of gratitude". In contrast to his first post in Moscow, he found himself enjoying access to top officials within the Ministry of Foreign Affairs and invitations to social events that other Western Bloc ambassadors could not get. All of this was planned by the KGB.

In April 1955, Watkins met then befriended "Aloysha", who introduced himself as Alexei Mikhailovich Gorbunov, a historian and consultant to the Soviet foreign ministry. Watkins also described him as his best Soviet informant. Watkins also met Anatoly Nitkin, who introduced himself as a professor of history at the Moscow Academy of History. Watkins did not know that "Aloysha" was actually KGB officer Oleg Mikhailovich Gribanov – the second-highest-ranking official within the Second Directorate and the mastermind of the entrapment operation against Watkins involving Kamahl – and Nitkin was Anatoly Gorsky, a KGB official senior to Gribanov and a former handler of Kim Philby. The three spent much time together, including a weekend at "Aloysha's" dacha in the Crimea in June. "Aloysha" would soon play an important role in Secretary of State for External Affairs Lester Pearson's visit to the Soviet Union.

After a meeting in San Francisco that same month, Pearson was invited by Soviet foreign minister Vyacheslav Molotov to visit the Soviet Union. Pearson had expressed his interest in visiting the USSR to Watkins the previous November, and it is likely that Watkins had relayed that to Soviet officials with whom he had established close contact. (Note: Robert Ford, who became Chargé d'affaires ad interim after Watkins' first post in Moscow, also claimed to have made the overtures that made the meeting possible.) Watkins reported in July that "Aloysha" had close contacts with Molotov, Khrushchev, and Nikolai Bulganin, and by August he was Watkins' main informant on the Soviet's views of the visit pending with Pearson. In planning the meeting, Pearson advised Watkins not to show the Soviets too much enthusiasm for their interest in a trade agreement. The official Canadian delegation included Pearson, Holmes, Watkins, George Ignatieff, Mitchell Sharp, and Raymond Crépault; Pearson's wife, Maryon, and journalists René Lévesque and Richard J. Needham accompanied them. On 5 October 1955, Molotov led the Soviet dignitaries in meeting the Canadians arriving at the Moscow airport. What has been described as the most memorable event of the trip is a drinking party that occurred when Pearson, Watkins, Ignatieff, and Crépault visited Khrushchev and Nikolai Bulganin at the Yusupov Palace in Yalta on 11 October. "Aloysha"/Gribanov also attended the party and was understood by the other Canadians to be Watkins' friend; Ignatieff apparently believed him to be a MVD official. It is at this party that Khrushchev was alleged by a KGB defector Yuri Nosenko to have taunted Watkins about his homosexuality during a toast. In his memoirs, Pearson noted that Watkins looked "less and less happy" as the evening progressed; however, Ignatieff, who understood Russian, denied that he heard the remark and Watkins' account of the meeting expressed no concerns.

Watson's writings show that he held a view of the Soviet Union was that more trustful and generous than that of Pearson or Ignatieff. He continued to meet with "Aloysha" and wrote the DEA to explain his importance to Khrushchev; Watkins even suggested that "Aloysha" wrote parts of the Soviet leader's speeches at the 20th Congress of the Communist Party of the Soviet Union. Pearson remained unconvinced about Soviet aims and told the House of Commons in January 1956 that "not a single basic objective of Soviet policy was changed". In February, Watkins sent Pearson a lengthy dispatch reiterating a meeting in which "Aloysha" voiced the Soviet's displeasure with Pearson over his continued skepticism of Soviet intentions. Pearson fired back: "My visit did not reassure me in regard to the peaceful aims of that policy, but certainly did convince me that the people themselves, whatever might be the views of their rulers, did sincerely desire peace. You might tell your friend Aloysha one day that if he wants to convince me of the pacific intentions of his Politburo friends, he should explain why they find it necessary to have 400 modern submarines." Watkins was recalled from the Soviet Union shortly afterwards.

More than a year after his affair with Kamahl and just before he was to return to Ottawa, Watkins was invited by "Aloysha" to his office. The Soviet official acted troubled and stated he had gained custody of the KGB material compromising to Watkins, but would do what he could to prevent the KGB from exploiting him. Watkins, understanding that his career depended upon the goodwill of the Soviets, had skilfully been placed into "Aloysha's" debt. Following through on the plan to get the ambassador to become an agent of influence steering Canadian policy away from the United States and towards the Soviet Union, "Aloysha" implied that Watkins could return the favour when he returned to Ottawa.

On 3 April 1956, Watkins was recalled to Ottawa to become assistant under-secretary of state for External Affairs. David Chalmer Reece, a former colleague of Watkins in the Canadian diplomatic corps who had also been one of his students at the University of Manitoba, recalled that Watkins "seemed much the same in Ottawa, gentle and charming, but a little melancholy and bothered by ill health".

=== Denmark ===
Watkins officially became the Canadian ambassador to Denmark on 30 August 1958. Having developed diabetes, his health continued to decline and he spent Christmas 1959 hospitalized in Copenhagen with a continuous nosebleed. Unwell and taking heart medications regularly, Watkins again returned to Ottawa in 1960 where he was an assistant undersecretary with External Affairs. After lengthy medical leaves, Watkins officially retired from the Department of External Affairs on 25 July 1963.

== Retirement ==
In retirement, Watkins prepared his move to France by donating his valuable collection of Russian and Scandinavian books to various Canadian universities. His collection of paintings by Pablo Picasso and Russian avant-garde artists, including Marc Chagall, were distributed to friends for safe-keeping. Watkins retired to Paris, where he lived at the Hôtel Lenox on the Left Bank. He was a frequent dinner guest of the Canadian ambassador to France, Jules Léger, and his wife Gabrielle, and Basil Rákóczi was among the many unknown artists he befriended. After entertaining his cousins in Paris and a road trip around Europe in May 1964, Watkins suffered a heart attack that summer. In September, he moved to an apartment in Montparnasse.

== Soviet defections, Operation Rock Bottom and death ==
In April 1962, two British officers from MI5 and MI6 who had assisted the United States Central Intelligence Agency in the debriefing of Soviet defector Anatoliy Golitsyn travelled to Ottawa to update the Security Service. The two officers reported that Golitsyn had brought with him a collection of leads into operations that the Soviet Second Directorate had directed against the Canadian Embassy, including an operation to blackmail a gay Canadian ambassador who had been caught in a sex trap. Golitsyn could only narrow the time frame to the 1950s and was unable to identify the ambassador or whether he had been swayed or controlled by the trap. In an effort to identify the unnamed ambassador, the Canadian Security Service launched Operation Rock Bottom. (Note: According to upi.com, Brandes testified during the inquest into Watkins death that "Rock Bottom" begain in September 1964 and was "the code name for the Watkins investigation".) Security Service officers Charles Sweeny and Leslie James Bennett – considered to be the RCMP's counterespionage guru – wanted to question Golitsyn for further details but were told they had to wait in line behind the Americans, British, French, Germans, and Dutch. While waiting for their turn, Sweeny and Bennett attempted to match up clues by scouring almost 500 files at External Affairs. In August 1962, they finally had their opportunity to question Golitsyn at a safehouse in Washington, D.C., but were unable to discover any new leads. The investigation initially focused on David Johnson, the Canadian ambassador to the Soviet Union from 1956 to 1960, who resigned his position after a previous investigation forced him to admit his homosexuality. Although Johnson had been an ambassador in the 1950s, other details from Golitsyn's leads did not match up. Additional review suggested that the unidentified ambassador could be Watkins, but the investigation stalled with no firm evidence against either him or Johnson.

In September 1963 in London, Soviet writer Yuri Krotkov defected to the West. Krotkov revealed that he had cooperated with the KGB years earlier in a seduction/compromise operation against Maurice Dejean, the French ambassador to the USSR, and his wife, and stated he had learned of a similar entrapment operation against a homosexual Canadian ambassador. Like Golitsyn, Krotkov said he did not know the ambassador's name, but he confirmed that the diplomat had fallen into the trap and the timeline he presented seemed to overlap with Watkins' post in Moscow. Although their suspicions had been pushed in the direction of Watkins, the Security Service felt they did not have enough evidence to interrogate the former ambassador. In February 1964, Yuri Nosenko, a KGB captain who had served in the Second Directorate, defected while in Geneva and in debriefing with the CIA identified the Canadian ambassador as Watkins. Given that the CIA suspected that Nosenko was a KGB plant sent to undermine Golitsyn, the information was not passed on to the Security Service until August 1964. The Canadians were not allowed to interview Nosenko. At this juncture, the Security Service had gone through Watkins' dispatches looking for evidence that he had attempted to influence Canadian policy in favour of the Soviets but were so overwhelmed by the vast number of files that they were unable to find any firm evidence. The RCMP determined that they would need to go to Paris and directly approach Watkins.

Bennett was the obvious choice to lead the investigation, and William Higgitt selected corporal Harry Brandes over veterans Lloyd Libke and Murray Sexsmith as the interrogator to back him up. The two members of the Royal Canadian Mounted Police's Soviet counterespionage unit flew to Paris where they immediately met with Ambassador Jules Léger at the Canadian Embassy to brief him on the reason for their trip and the allegations against Watkins. Watkins was a friend of Léger and was frequently invited to the embassy and Léger's home, so the two investigators hoped Léger could help them get Watkins to cooperate. Léger was skeptical of the allegations and initially reluctant to assist the investigators in approaching Watkins. He cautioned Bennett and Brandes that Watkins' had a recent heart attack and was not well. Understanding that Bennett and Brandes could approach Watkins without his help, Léger eventually agreed to assist the following day. That evening at an already scheduled dinner party at the embassy, Léger led the frail-looking Watkins into his office where he was introduced to Bennett and Brandes, the purpose of their visit from Canada described to him as a matter of national importance. Watkins, reportedly understanding the purpose of their visit even before it was explained to him, agreed to help. Watkins was told by Bennett that he could consult with Léger or anyone else, but he declined, stating that the ambassador would be hurt by the details.

Watkins was picked up at his apartment the following morning and taken to a CIA safehouse where he admitted to having a liaison with someone apparently under KGB control and failing to report it. He denied that he was blackmailed or did anything in conflict with Canadian interests. Bennett told Watkins that they preferred not to question him in France, and that the Canadian government would pay for him to travel to Ottawa. Watkins declined for fear of inadvertently running into old friends there, but he did agree to Bennett's suggestion of going to London, where the debriefing continued at an MI5 safehouse. In London, Watkins met with John Wendell Holmes, his close friend and confidant who preceded him as chargé d'affaires in Moscow, and told him that he was being investigated as a possible security risk. After a week, Bennett and Brandes convinced Watkins to allow them to move the questioning to Montreal. There, the interrogation continued at the Holiday Inn Chateaubriand on Côte-de-Liesse Road. Each day, more details emerged as Watkins' revealed the story of his homosexuality, meeting Kamahl, and the Soviet's attempt to pressure him. After verifying Watkins' statements with the lengthy dispatches he had written in Moscow nearly ten years earlier, Bennett and Brandes were convinced that the former ambassador had been truthful and that the KGB attempt to blackmail him had failed.

On the evening of 12 October 1964, the interrogation was essentially finished when Watkins, while reminiscing about his diplomatic career, suffered a heart attack and died instantly. After feeling no pulse and attempting chest compressions, Bennett and Brandes telephoned for help. Two police officers from Saint-Laurent, Quebec, Remy Martin and Pierre Lemire, and two ambulance attendants responded to their call. (Note: According to John Sawatsky, Bennett and Brandes were met by two plainclothes detectives from Saint-Laurent.) Gus Begalki, the RCMP Security Service's senior non-commissioned officer, then convinced the Saint-Laurent police chief to keep the matter quiet out of concern that publicity regarding Watkins' death might allow the KGB to take countermeasures for the intelligence the Security Service had acquired regarding their operating methods.

Coroner Marcel Trahan ruled that Watkins had an "unforeseeable" death due to heart attack, and his report stated that Watkins died in the company of "friends" awaiting a flight to England. The report listed Brandes as the only witness and said he should be considered "a friend of the deceased". Brandes was not identified as a member of the RCMP and Bennett's name was not mentioned.

Watkins' death certificate was signed by pathologist Iona Kerner. Kerner only externally examined the body and observed no unusual markings, and an investigative report stated "coronary thrombosis in an unexpected, sudden, and accidental death". No autopsy was performed.

== Investigation of death ==
In 1980, the circumstances of Watkins' death started to become public when David Martin's Wilderness of Mirrors revealed that the KGB, using a honey trap, had targeted Watkins for blackmail because of his homosexuality. Chapman Pincher's March 1981 book Their Trade is Treachery was reported to have caused a "sensation in the press" with the claim that Watkins died while being questioned in a Montreal hotel room. In April 1981, for the second edition of S – Portrait of a Spy, Ian Adams found that the Quebec coroner who had signed Watkins' death certificate in 1964 had not realized he was a former ambassador nor was he aware of the true circumstances of his death. Additional details of Watkins' entrapment emerged in John Sawatsky's two-part series published in June 1981.

In September 1981, Quebec Minister of Justice Marc-André Bédard ordered an inquest into the death of Watkins. Solicitor General Robert Kaplan criticized the inquest as "unnecessary and a witch hunt", but said he would cooperate with the investigation. A few weeks prior, Dery stated that he wanted to interview Bennett and that he was considering plans to take the inquest to Australia, where the former Mountie had retired, or bring him to the inquest in Canada.

Twenty-one witnesses testified at the inquest, including many police officers whose testimony was often contradictory. Martin, one of the constables who responded to the Chateaubriand Holiday Inn, said that he received the impression from a telephone call made by Lemire that Watkins' body was taken to the morgue over the objections of Bennett and Brandes; however, Lemire, his partner, said the only telephone calls he made were to verify the identities of Bennett and Brandes. The person to whom Lemire's call was allegedly made was also found not to have been on duty that night. Written testimony from Watkins' only known living relatives stated that his health had declined in the six months prior to his death.

On 22 December 1981, Brandes, then chief superintendent of the RCMP, also testified that Watkins' health was failing, so they let him dictate the pace of the questioning. He said that the former diplomat was not held against his will, and that he voluntarily cooperated with the investigation. Bennett stated that he and Bennett were in constant contact with Watkins, including visits to the theatre, watching television, and going for walks together, and that the interrogations typically occurred once each day for about three hours. He testified that on the day Watkins died, he was questioned for four hours in a session focused on recapping information about events already obtained from him. Bennett stated that Watkins was reminiscing about his time in the diplomatic corps when he suddenly collapsed and died. Although he had known Watkins for only a month, Brandes stood by his statement that appeared in the coroner's report that noted he was his friend. He testified: "We spent a great deal of time together under very close relations and, yes, I considered him a friend." Brandes testified that he and Bennett sought to avoid publicity of the former ambassador's death "for the protection of operational national matters that had international ramifications" and only asked the police investigators to avoid making his death a cause célèbre. Brandes had not mentioned that he was an RCMP officer and said that had not thought it was important to notify Montreal authorities that Watkins was a former diplomat.

Kerner, the pathologist, said she would have "most certainly" conducted an autopsy had she known that Watkins was a former diplomat having died in the presence of RCMP officers. After a two-week recess in the proceedings, John Wendell Holmes testified that he initially "took it as a joke of some sort" when Watkins told him in London that he was being investigated by the RCMP as a security risk. Holmes stated that Watkins behaved as someone "who felt he didn't have much longer to live, because of his heart attack", but believed him to be on good terms with those interrogating him. Alex Capon, a physician called to see Watkins a few days prior to his death, told the inquest: "It came as no surprise to me to learn of his death." During a break in the interrogation, Capon had advised Watkins to enter the hospital immediately; however, Watkins refused. In May 1982, Bennett was interviewed in Australia by two Quebec Police Force officers. On 23 June 1982, the inquest concluded when Dery ruled that Watkins died from natural causes unrelated to intensive police questioning. The RCMP was completely exonerated in the role of Watkins' death.

== Legacy ==
Endowed by Watkins' estate, two awards are bestowed by the Canada Council for the Arts in his name: the J.B.C. Watkins Award for Architecture and J.B.C. Watkins Award for Music and Theatre.

In his 1999 book Agent of Influence, Adams suggested that the CIA had schemed to destroy Pearson, who had become prime minister, and had tried to get Watkins to implicate him. In 2002, the book was made into a television movie with the same title, starring Christopher Plummer as Watkins. It was released in 2003 and distributed by the Movie Network Encore in 2018.

Watkins and his friend, fellow diplomat Herbert Norman, were the inspiration for "Harry Raymond", the central character in Timothy Findley's play The Stillborn Lover (1993).

== See also ==
- Agent of influence
- Sexpionage

== Note ==
Diplomatic posts
Preceded by Herbert Feaver	Ambassador Extraordinary and Plenipotentiary to Denmark; 1958–1960	Succeeded by Hector Allard
