= List of ambassadors of Canada to Russia =

Ambassador of Canada to Russia
- Incumbent; Sarah Taylor since November 9, 2023
- Seat: Embassy of Canada
- Nominator: Prime Minister of Canada
- Appointer: Governor General of Canada
- Term length: At His Majesty's pleasure
- Inaugural holder: L. Dana Wilgress
- Formation: October 5, 1942

The ambassador of Canada to Russia is the official representative of the Canadian government to the government of Russia. The official title for the ambassador is the Ambassador Extraordinary and Plenipotentiary of Canada to the Russian Federation. The ambassador of Canada to Russia is Sarah Taylor who was appointed on the advice of Prime Minister Justin Trudeau on November 9, 2023.

The Embassy of Canada is located at Starokonyushennyy Pereulok, 23, Moscow, Russia, 119002.

== History of diplomatic relations ==
Canada and the USSR had de facto diplonmatic recognition on July 3, 1992, and de jure diplomatic recornition on March 4, 1924. Diplomatic relations between Canada and the Union of Soviet Socialist Republics (USSR) was established on June 12, 1942. L. Dana Wilgress was appointed as Canada's first Envoy on October 5, 1942, and first ambassador on December 9, 1943.

The USSR was dissolved on December 26, 1991, and Canada recognized the Russian Federation as the continuation of the USSR. Michael Richard Bell continued in the role of Ambassador until his replacement with Jeremy K.B. Kinsman on August 27, 1992.

== Ambassadors of Canada to Russia ==
| No. | Name | Term of office | | | Career | Prime Minister nominated by | Ref. |
| No. | Name | Start Date | PoC. | End Date | Career | Prime Minister nominated by | Ref. |
|---|---|---|---|---|---|---|---|
| 1 | Michael Richard Bell | September 12, 1990 | | December 17, 1992 | Career | Brian Mulroney (1984–1993) | |
| 2 | Jeremy K.B. Kinsman | August 27, 1992 | | 1996 | Career | Brian Mulroney (1984–1993) | |
| 3 | Anne Leahy | June 3, 1996 | September 26, 1996 | 1999 | Career | Jean Chrétien (1993–2003) | |
| 4 | Rodney Irwin | August 11, 1999 | December 16, 1999 | August 1, 2003 | Career | Jean Chrétien (1993–2003) | |
| 5 | Chris Westdal | July 15, 2003 | October 13, 2003 | July 28, 2006 | Career | Jean Chrétien (1993–2003) | |
| 6 | Ralph Lysyshyn | June 14, 2006 | November 16, 2006 | August 21, 2010 | Career | Stephen Harper (2006–2015) | |
| 7 | John Sloan | August 25, 2010 | October 18, 2010 | September 20, 2013 | Career | Stephen Harper (2006–2015) | |
| 8 | John Kur | August 16, 2013 | January 16, 2014 | August 18, 2018 | Career | Stephen Harper (2006–2015) | |
| | Stéphane Jobin (Chargé) | August 18, 2018 | October 15, 2019 | October 2020 | Career | | |
| 9 | Alison LeClaire | October 15, 2019 | February 5, 2020 | November 30, 2023 | Career | Justin Trudeau (2015–2025) | |
| 10 | Sarah Taylor | November 9, 2023 | November 5, 2024 | | Career | Justin Trudeau (2015–2025) | |

== Ambassadors of Canada to the Soviet Union (1944–1992) ==
| No. | Name | Term of office | | | Career | Prime Minister nominated by | Ref. |
| No. | Name | Start Date | PoC. | End Date | Career | Prime Minister nominated by | Ref. |
|---|---|---|---|---|---|---|---|
| – | Leolyn Dana Wilgress | October 5, 1942 | March 28, 1943 | February 29, 1944 | Career | W. L. Mackenzie King (1935–1948) | |
| 1 | Leolyn Dana Wilgress | December 9, 1943 | February 29, 1944 | April 8, 1947 | Career | W. L. Mackenzie King (1935–1948) | |
| – | Léon Mayrand (Chargé d'Affaires) | April 1945 | | March 1947 | Career | W. L. Mackenzie King (1935–1948) | |
| – | Robert Arthur Douglass Ford (Chargé d'Affaires) | April 8, 1947 | | November 4, 1947 | Career | W. L. Mackenzie King (1935–1948) | |
| – | John Wendell Holmes (Chargé d'Affaires) | November 4, 1947 | | August 31, 1948 | Career | W. L. Mackenzie King (1935–1948) | |
| – | John Watkins (Chargé d'Affaires) | September 1, 1948 | | February 15, 1951 | Career | W. L. Mackenzie King (1935–1948) | |
| – | Robert Arthur Douglass Ford (Chargé d'Affaires) | February 15, 1951 | | April 12, 1954 | Career | Louis St. Laurent (1948–1957) | |
| 2 | John Watkins | January 14, 1954 | | April 15, 1956 | Career | Louis St. Laurent (1948–1957) | |
| 3 | David Moffat Johnson | April 4, 1956 | July 27, 1956 | | Career | Louis St. Laurent (1948–1957) | |
| 4 | Arnold Cantwell Smith | October 14, 1960 | February 25, 1961 | August 30, 1963 | Career | John G. Diefenbaker (1957–1963) | |
| 5 | Robert Arthur Douglass Ford | January 10, 1964 | January 23, 1964 | September 1, 1980 | Career | Lester B. Pearson (1963–1968) | |
| 6 | Geoffrey Pearson | July 10, 1980 | October 29, 1980 | | Career | Pierre Elliott Trudeau (1968–1979) (1980–1984) | |
| 7 | Peter McLaren Roberts | October 13, 1983 | October 26, 1983 | | Career | Pierre Elliott Trudeau (1968–1979) (1980–1984) | |
| 8 | Vernon George Turner | December 5, 1985 | February 19, 1986 | 1990 | Career | Brian Mulroney (1984–1993) | |
| 9 | Michael Richard Bell | September 12, 1990 | November 5, 1990 | December 17, 1992 | Career | Brian Mulroney (1984–1993) | |

== See also ==
- Canada–Russia relations
- Embassy of Canada in Moscow
