= Josaphat Brunet =

Canadian police officer (1902–1974)

- Born: 1902; Quebec
- Died: 1974 (aged 71–72)
- Other names: J.J. Brunet
- Occupation: Police officer
- Known for: A former counter-intelligence official whose son became a KGB mole

Josaphat Brunet (1902-1974) was a Canadian police officer.

He was director of the RCMP Security Service before being promoted to Deputy Commissioner of the Royal Canadian Mounted Police in 1958. Following this, he briefly became Director of Security for the National Bank of Canada. In 1960, he was appointed Director General of the Sûreté du Québec, a post he held for five years.

Brunet's son, Gilles Brunet, followed his father into the RCMP Security Service, but was fired from the RCMP in 1973, due to ties to organized crime figures. Western intelligence agencies would later learn that Gilles had become a double agent for the Soviet Union and had been paid to betray Canada and its allies. Another man, Leslie James Bennett, had been fired due to CIA suspicions that he was the mole within the RCMP.
