= Permanent Representative of Canada to the United Nations =

Ambassador and Permanent Representative of Canada to the United Nations
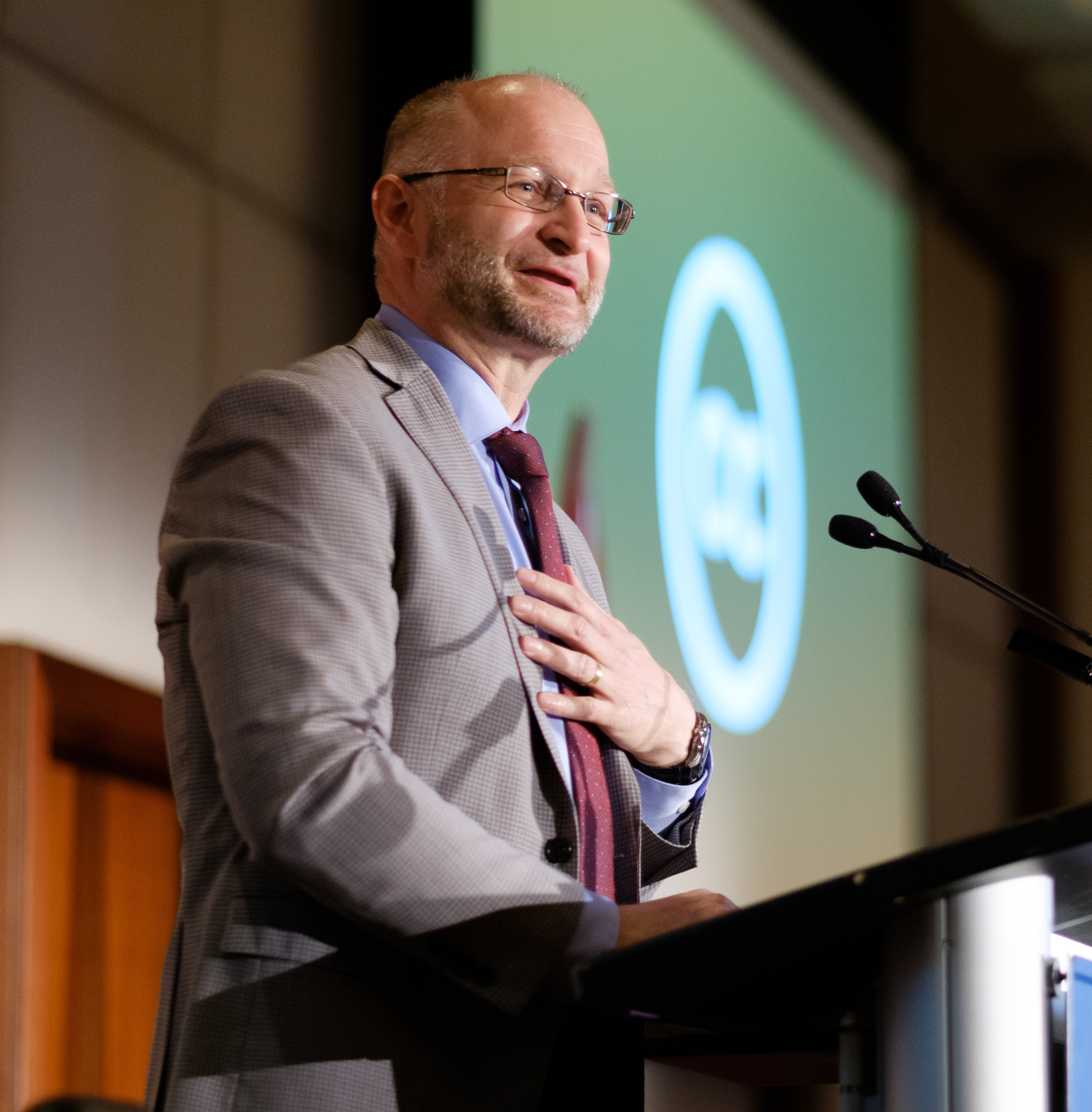
- Incumbent; David Lametti since November 17, 2025
- Global Affairs Canada
- Style: Mr. Ambassador (informal); His Excellency (diplomatic)
- Seat: 466 Lexington Ave., 20th floor New York, New York, U.S.
- Term length: No fixed term
- Precursor: Chief of Delegation to the League of Nations
- Formation: 1946
- First holder: Andrew McNaughton
- Deputy: Deputy Permanent Representative
- Website: international.gc.ca/un

The Ambassador and Permanent Representative of Canada to the United Nations (French: Ambassadeur et Représentant permanent du Canada auprès des Nations unies), known unofficially as the Canadian Ambassador to the United Nations (French: Ambassadeur du Canada aux Nations unies), is the Permanent Representative of Canada to the United Nations. The position was established in 1946 and is based at the Permanent Mission of Canada to the United Nations, which is located at 466 Lexington Avenue (20th floor) in New York City.

== Permanent missions of Canada ==
=== New York ===
The Permanent Mission of Canada to the United Nations in New York City, where the main headquarters of the United Nations is located, is responsible for the multilateral foreign policy priorities of Canada, facilitating Canada's interests in international development, peace, security and human rights.

=== Geneva ===
The Permanent Mission of Canada to the World Trade Organization, the United Nations and the Conference on Disarmament in Geneva is the primary avenue for diplomatic relations between the Government of Canada and international organizations based in Geneva, Switzerland, mainly the World Trade Organization (WTO), the United Nations Office at Geneva (UNOG), the Conference on Disarmament and the World Intellectual Property Organization (WIPO).

Canada's Permanent Representative to the UN and the Conference on Disarmament in Geneva is Ambassador Leslie E. Norton. Canada's Permanent Representative to the WTO is Ambassador Stephen de Boer. In addition to local personnel, the mission is composed of staff from various Canadian federal departments and agencies.

== List of permanent representatives ==
Image	Name	Start of term	End of term
	General Andrew McNaughton	January 1948	December 1949
	John Wendell Holmes	January 1950	June 1950
	Robert Gerald Riddell	June 1950	March 16, 1951
	David Moffat Johnson	November 1951	August 1955
	Robert Alexander MacKay	August 1955	November 1957
	Frank Exton Lennard	November 1957	January 1958
	Charles S.A. Ritchie	January 1958	February 1962
	Paul Tremblay	July 1962	June 1966
	George Ignatieff	July 1966	February 1969
	Yvon Beaulne	February 1969	June 1972
	Saul F. Rae	July 1972	July 1976
	William H. Barton	August 1976	April 1980
	Michel Dupuy	April 1980	May 1981
	Gérard Pelletier	May 1981	August 1984
	Stephen Lewis	1984	August 1988
	Yves Fortier	August 1988	December 1991
	Louise Fréchette	January 1992	December 1994
	Robert Fowler	January 1995	August 2000
	Paul Heinbecker	August 2000	January 2004
	Allan Rock	January 2004	June 2006
	John McNee	July 2006	July 2011
	Guillermo Rishchynski	August 2011	January 2016
	Marc-André Blanchard	April 1, 2016	July 31, 2020
	Bob Rae	August 1, 2020	November 17, 2025
	David Lametti	November 17, 2025	Incumbent

== Chiefs of Delegation to the League of Nations ==
Prior to 1946, Canada sent representatives, called 'Chiefs of Delegation', to the League of Nations. On three occasions, the Chief of Delegation was the Prime Minister of Canada:

- 1928 – William Lyon Mackenzie King
- 1934 – Richard Bedford Bennett
- 1936 – William Lyon Mackenzie King

== See also ==
- List of ambassadors and high commissioners of Canada
- Mission of Canada to the European Union
