= Hunt for Justice =

2005 television film

- Genre: Drama
- Written by: Ian Adams; Riley Adams; Michelle Lovretta
- Directed by: Charles Binamé
- Starring: Wendy Crewson; John Corbett; Stipe Erceg
- Theme music composer: Michel Cusson
- Country of origin: Canada
- Original language: English

Production
- Producer: Francine Allaire
- Cinematography: Georges Archambault
- Editor: Dominique Fortin
- Running time: 85 minutes
- Production companies: Galafilm; TATfilm

Original release
- Network: FIFM
- Release: September 25, 2005
- Network: CTV
- Release: March 25, 2006

Hunt for Justice, also known as Hunt for Justice: The Louise Arbour Story, is a television film, directed by Charles Binamé and released in 2005. A co-production of companies from Canada and Germany, the film stars Wendy Crewson as Louise Arbour, the Canadian human rights lawyer turned Supreme Court of Canada justice, as she fights, in her capacity as chief prosecutor for the International Criminal Tribunal for the former Yugoslavia in the late 1990s, to secure an indictment of Yugoslavian president Slobodan Milošević on war crimes charges.

The cast also includes John Corbett as military captain John Tanner and Stipe Erceg as Bosnian translator Pasko Odzak, as well as Heino Ferch, William Hurt, Leslie Hope, Claudia Ferri, Jacques Godin, Michael Murphy and Elina Löwensohn in supporting roles.

== Production and distribution ==
Shot in 2004, the film premiered theatrically at the 2005 Festival International de Films de Montréal, and received special screenings in Ottawa in October, and at the United Nations in December.

It was planned for broadcast on CTV in the 2005–06 season, but had not yet had a confirmed broadcast date as of Milošević's death on March 11, 2006, which prompted the network to schedule its broadcast for March 25 that year.

== Awards ==
Award	Date of ceremony	Category	Nominees	Result	Reference
Gemini Awards	21st Gemini Awards	Best Television Movie or Miniseries November 4, 2006	Arnie Gelbart, Francine Allaire, Randy Holleschau, Anne Marie La Traverse, Christine Ruppert	Won	
Gemini Awards	21st Gemini Awards	Best Writing in a Dramatic Program or Miniseries	Ian Adams, Riley Adams, Michelle Lovretta	Nominated	
Gemini Awards	21st Gemini Awards	Best Picture Editing in a Dramatic Program or Series	Dominique Fortin	Nominated	
Gemini Awards	21st Gemini Awards	Best Sound in a Dramatic Program	Claude Beaugrand, Claude La Haye, Bernard Gariépy Strobl	Nominated	
