= Robert Alexander MacKay =

Canadian political scientist and diplomat

Canadian Ambassador to the United Nations
- In office August 1955 – November 1957
- Preceded by: David Johnson
- Succeeded by: Frank Exton Lennard

Personal details
- Born: 2 January 1894
- Died: 25 November 1979 (aged 85)

Robert Alexander MacKay (January 2, 1894 – November 25, 1979) was a Canadian political scientist and diplomat.

== Background ==
After serving in the First World War and studying at the University of Toronto and Princeton University, MacKay taught at Dalhousie University from 1927 to 1947. He was a member of the Rowell–Sirois Commission. During the Second World War, MacKay worked for the Department of External Affairs.

After the Second World War, MacKay rejoined the Department of External Affairs in 1947. He was Canada's Permanent Representative to the United Nations from 1955 to 1958 and Canadian Ambassador to Norway from 1958 to 1961. He then taught at Carleton University from 1961 to 1972.

He was the father of William Andrew MacKay.
