= Landon Pearson =

Canadian politician, author, and children's rights advocate (1930–2023)

The Honourable Landon Pearson OC

Canadian Senator from Ontario
- In office 15 September 1994 – 16 November 2005
- Appointed by: Jean Chrétien

Personal details
- Born: 16 November 1930 Toronto, Ontario, Canada
- Died: 28 January 2023 (aged 92) Ottawa, Ontario, Canada
- Party: Liberal
- Spouse: Geoffrey Pearson (m. 1951; died 2008)
- Children: 5, including Patricia
- Education: Trinity College, Toronto; University of Ottawa
- Profession: Author; Children’s Rights Advocate

Landon Carter "Lucy" Pearson OC (née Mackenzie; 16 November 1930 – 28 January 2023) was a Canadian Senator and a children's rights advocate. She was the daughter-in-law of former Prime Minister Lester B. Pearson, through her marriage to his son Geoffrey Pearson.

Pearson was appointed to the Senate of Canada on 15 September 1994 by then Prime Minister Jean Chrétien and sat with the Liberal caucus. She retired from the Senate on 16 November 2005 upon reaching the mandatory retirement age of 75.

== Career ==
Her book, Children of Glasnost (1990) described growing up in the Soviet Union, and how that changed as Russian society became more open. A second book, Letters from Moscow, a selection of her personal correspondence while living in Moscow while her husband was the Canadian ambassador to the Soviet Union, was published in 2003. Most recently in 2010, in collaboration with Judy Finlay PhD, Pearson published Tibacimowin: A Gathering of Stories, which gathered and translated oral history stories from members of some Ontario First Nations elders peoples.

She was also served as a board member for the First Nations Child and Family Caring Society advocating for culturally based equity for First Nations children and reconciliation based education for all children in Canada.

== Activism ==
In 1974 she cofounded Children Learning for Living, a prevention program in children's mental health. It operated for 23 years through the Ottawa Board of Education until 1998.

Pearson was a school trustee in both Canada and India; and has been involved in community-based programs such as Mobile Creches for Working Mothers' Children, a child care service for the children of nomadic construction workers in New Delhi and Bombay.

In 1979, she was Vice-Chairperson of the Canadian Commission for the International Year of the Child and edited the Commission's report, For Canada's Children: National Agenda for Action. Among her recommendations were

- increased financial support for battered women's shelters
- funding for unwed mothers seeking to continue their education
- amendments to the Income Tax Act to allow a greater deduction for child care costs
- laws requiring car seat restraints for infants.
- legislation to return Indian rights to Native women who married non-Indian men.

Many of these recommendations have been carried out.

From 1984 to 1990 she was President, then Chairperson of the Canadian Council on Children and Youth. She was a founding member and Chairperson of the Canadian Coalition for the Rights of Children in 1989 until she was appointed to the Senate, September 1994.

Pearson was a director of the Centre for the Study of Children at Risk at McMaster University; a delegate to the Fourth World Conference on Women in Beijing, September 1995; a delegate to the First World Congress against Commercial Sexual Exploitation of Children in Stockholm, August 1996; the alternate head of the Canadian delegation to the International Child Labour Conference in Oslo, October 1997; the co-chair of Out From the Shadows: International Summit of Sexually Exploited Youth in Victoria, British Columbia, March 1998; and the co-chair of the Special Joint Committee on Child Custody and Access which drafted the report entitled For the Sake of the Children, 1998.

In May 1996, Senator Pearson was named Advisor on Children’s Rights to the Minister of Foreign Affairs. She provided advice to the Minister, on a regular basis, concerning children's issues in the foreign policy context and on the impact of domestic policies for children on our international commitments, notably the Convention on the Rights of the Child. In June 1999, she was named Personal Representative of Prime Minister Jean Chrétien to the 2002 Special Session on Children of the United Nations General Assembly.

On 3 November 2006, Pearson announced the opening of The Landon Pearson Resource Centre for the Study of Childhood and Children's Rights. The Centre’s mandate is to promote activities that address issues relating to children, childhood and communities, to make the resources available to students and faculty at Carleton University, to host events and speakers, and to secure the resources required to promote these activities. The Centre opened on 2 June 2006, International Children's Day. In 2010 Pearson retired as Director of the Resource Centre, but it continues to run in affiliation with Carleton University in Ottawa. The centre is connected to the Child Rights Information Network (CRIN).

== Honours ==
Senator Pearson graduated from King's Hall, Compton in Quebec and Trinity College in the University of Toronto in 1951 with a B.A. in Philosophy and English and from the University of Ottawa in 1978 with a M.Ed. in psychopedagogy. She received an honorary Doctor of Laws from Wilfrid Laurier University in May 1995, an honorary Doctor of Laws from the University of Victoria in November 2001, a Doctor of University (D.U.) from the University of Ottawa in June 2002, and an honorary Doctors of Law from Carleton University in June 2003 for her work on children's rights.

Pearson was honoured for her work on behalf of children from the United Way of Ottawa-Carleton, and through receipt of the Canadian Volunteer Award and the Norma V. Bowen Humanitarian Award of the Ontario Psychological Foundation. In 2008, she was made an Officer of the Order of Canada.

== Personal life ==
Pearson was married to Canadian diplomat Geoffrey Pearson, the son of former Prime Minister Lester B. Pearson and Maryon Pearson, until his death on 18 March 2008. Their daughter, Patricia Pearson, is a notable Canadian writer.

Pearson and her husband had five children and twelve grandchildren. As the wife of a former Canadian diplomat, she raised their five children in Canada, France, Mexico, India and the Soviet Union.

== Death ==
Pearson died in Ottawa on 28 January 2023, at the age of 92.

== See also ==
- List of Ontario senators
