= 1956 Governor General's Awards =

Canadian literary award

In Canada, the 1956 Governor General's Awards for Literary Merit were the twentieth such awards. The awards in this period had no monetary prize but were an honour for the authors.

== Winners ==
- Fiction: Adele Wiseman, The Sacrifice.
- Poetry or Drama: Robert A.D. Ford, A Window on the North.
- Non-Fiction: Pierre Berton, The Mysterious North.
- Non-Fiction: Joseph Lister Rutledge, Century of Conflict.
- Juvenile: Farley Mowat, Lost in the Barrens.
