= Robert Gerald Riddell =

Canadian diplomat (1908–1951)

Canadian Ambassador to the United Nations
- In office June 1950 – March 16, 1951
- Preceded by: John Wendell Holmes
- Succeeded by: David Johnson

Personal details
- Born: 4 May 1908 Edmonton, Alberta Canada
- Died: 16 March 1951 (aged 42) Virginia Beach, Virginia, U.S.

Robert Gerald (Gerry) Riddell (May 4, 1908 — March 16, 1951) was a Canadian diplomat and historian. At the time of his death, he was the Permanent Representative of Canada to the United Nations. Riddell was born in Edmonton, Alberta and moved to Manitoba when his father, John Henry Riddell, became principal of Wesley College in 1917.

== Background ==
Riddell earned his BA from the University of Manitoba in 1930 and his Masters of Arts from the University of Toronto before earning a degree at Oxford in 1934.

He taught history at the University of Toronto from 1934 until 1942 when he joined the Department of External Affairs in Ottawa. In 1946 he became head of the department's United Nations desk and then special assistant and speech writer for Secretary of State for External Affairs Lester Pearson. He was appointed Canadian ambassador to the United Nations in June 1950 and served until he died of a heart attack while on holiday in Virginia on March 16, 1951, at the age of 42.

His widow, Kay Riddell, founded the International Students' Centre at the University of Toronto (now the Centre for International Experience).

His son, John Riddell, would become a Marxist writer and editor and leader of the League for Socialist Action.
