= Bower Featherstone =

Canadian civil servant

- Born: 1940; Ottawa, Canada
- Died: 2017 (aged 76–77); Ottawa, Canada
- Other name: Bower Edward Featherstone
- Occupation: civil servant
- Known for: Convicted of being a GRU mole in 1966

Bower Featherstone was a Canadian civil servant who was convicted of espionage in 1966.

Featherstone was a lithographer who worked for the Department of Energy, Mines and Resources.

A promising young officer in the RCMP Security Service, Gilles G. Brunet, played a significant role in his conviction, work for which he won a promotion. His handler was Eugen Kourianov. According to Nigel West, Kourianov was suddenly recalled to the Soviet Union, suggesting a mole had tipped off the Soviets. Decades later western intelligence learned that Brunet, the young officer who won promotion for his work in convicting Featherstone, had also been a mole.

The main document he was convicted of handing over to the Soviets was a confidential chart of two shipwrecks southeast of Newfoundland. Although he was convicted of violating Canada's Official Secrets Act none of the documents he passed on was actually secret. Featherstone was the first individual to be convicted under the Official Secrets Act since the trials that followed the defection of Igor Gouzenko in the late 1940s.

Featherstone received a 30-month sentence, and served 10 months—2 months in the maximum security Collins Bay Institution, and 8 months at a minimum security forestry camp, before he was paroled.
