= Patricia Pearson =

Canadian writer and journalist

- Born: April 7, 1964 (age 62); Mexico City, Mexico
- Education: Trinity College, Toronto; University of Chicago; Columbia School of Journalism
- Occupations: Journalist, writer
- Children: 2
- Parent(s): Geoffrey Pearson; Landon Pearson
- Relatives: Lester B. Pearson (grandfather); Maryon Pearson (grandmother)

Patricia Pearson (born April 7, 1964) is a Canadian writer and journalist. She has published two novels and several works of nonfiction.

== Life and work ==
Born in Mexico City, Pearson is one of five children of Canadian diplomat Geoffrey Pearson and former Ontario Senator Landon Pearson, and the granddaughter of former Prime Minister Lester Pearson. She was educated at Netherwood School in Rothesay, New Brunswick; Trinity College, Toronto; the University of Chicago; and Columbia School of Journalism in New York.

Pearson has written for magazines such as The New Yorker, Toronto Life, Reader's Digest and Business Week. Her newspaper work has appeared in The Globe and Mail, The Toronto Star, The New York Times, National Post, The Guardian, and The Daily Telegraph. She's also written for CBC Television, The History Channel and TVOntario.

Pearson resigned her weekly column at the National Post in 2003 to protest that newspaper's support for the Bush administration in the lead-up to the Iraq war. Her subsequent satirical writing has been hailed as "hysterically funny" by the Los Angeles Times and “highly amusing” by the New York Times.

Pearson has lived in New York City, Delhi and Moscow, and now resides in Toronto, Ontario with her husband and two children.

== Bibliography ==
=== Novels ===
- Playing House (Random House of Canada, 2003)
- Believe Me (Random House of Canada, 2005)

=== Non-fiction ===
- When She Was Bad: How and Why Women Get Away with Murder (1998) Viking USA, Virago UK, Random House Canada
- Area Woman Blows Gasket: Tales from the Domestic Frontier (2005) Vintage Canada
- A Brief History of Anxiety (Yours & Mine) (Bloomsbury, 2008)
- Opening Heaven's Door: What the Dying May Be Trying to Tell Us About Where They're Going (Random House, 2014) ISBN 9780307360137 (reprinted as Opening Heaven's Door: What the Dying Are Trying to Say about Where They're Going)
- Looks Can Kill: A Doctor's Journey Through Steroids, Addiction and Online Fitness Culture (with Riam Shaamaa) (Random House Canada, 2020) ISBN 9780735277472
- Wish You Were Here: A Murdered Girl, a Brother's Quest and the Hunt for a Serial Killer (with John Allore) (Random House, 2020) ISBN 9780735277168

=== Articles ===
- Pearson, Patricia (17 October 2011). "Shouts & Murmurs: History: The Customer Reviews". The New Yorker.

== Awards ==
- 1994 National Magazine Award (Honourable mention, Science, Health and Medicine category, for "Murder on her Mind")
- 1995 National Magazine Award (Gold, Essay category, for "Behind Every Successful Psychopath")
- 1998 National Magazine Award (Gold, One-of-a-kind Articles category, for "Death Becomes Her")
- 1996 National Author's Award
- 1997 Arthur Ellis Award for best non-fiction crime book
- 2004 Stephen Leacock Memorial Medal for Humour, finalist
