= Ian Adams =

Canadian writer (1937–2021)

- Adams in 1981
- Born: July 22, 1937; Tabora, Tanganyika Territory
- Died: November 7, 2021 (aged 84); Peterborough, Ontario
- Citizenship: Canadian
- Occupations: Novelist, photographer, investigative reporter
- Children: Shane and Riley Adams
- Website: www.ian-adams.com

Ian Adams (July 22, 1937 — November 7, 2021) was a Canadian author of fiction and non-fiction novels, television, and movies. Originally a journalist, he later authored the novels S – Portrait of a Spy and Agent of Influence.

== Early life and education ==
Adams was born in present-day Tanzania to Lillian and Richard Adams, Irish lay missionaries who were administering a medical clinic in the former Belgian Congo. According to family lore, a pregnant Lillian singlehandedly canoed across a narrow stretch of Lake Tanganyika so that Adams would be born in what was then the British colony of Tanganyika rather than in the Belgian colony his parents were working in. He grew up in Central and East Africa.

During World War II, both of Adams's parents joined the British Army. His mother as an ambulance driver and his father as an engineer, while three-year old Ian was sent to boarding school. Adams resented his parents for abandoning him at a young age. The entire family later moved to North America, but Adams did so separately as a teenager, living on his own in Winnipeg, where he studied fine arts at the University of Manitoba.

== Career ==
=== Maclean's ===
Adams served as investigative journalist for five years at Maclean's, Canada's national news magazine, where he covered national stories, including "The Lonely Death of Charlie Wenjack" (Volume 80, February 1967), reprinted under the title "Why did Charlie Wenjack Die?" in The Poverty Wall in 1970.

Chanie Wenjack was an Indigenous First Nations child who ran away from a residential school in northern Ontario in an attempt to reach his father, 650 kilometres away. The child was found beside a CNR track, poorly dressed and dead of hunger and cold. In the Maclean's article, Adams wrote: "Under the heading The Lonely Death of Charlie Wenjack, he wrote, "It's not so unusual that Indian children run away from the residential schools they are sent to. They do it all the time, and they lose their fingers and toes to frostbite. Sometimes they lose a leg or an arm trying to climb aboard freight trains. Occasionally, one of them dies. And perhaps because they are Indians, no one seems to care very much. So this, then, is the story of how a little boy met a terrible and lonely death, of the handful of people who became involved, and of a town that hardly noticed."

=== Freelance writing ===
The story resulted in a series of complaints to the magazine by readers, including the CEO of the magazine's publisher, Maclean-Hunter, who wrote Adams telling him that he did not think that sort of writing belonged in the magazine. Adams quit the publication and pursued a freelance career. In September 2012 Adams was interviewed about the Charlie Wenjack story as part of the CBC documentary "Dying For An Education". Gord Downie, lead singer of the Canadian band The Tragically Hip, cited Adams' Maclean's article as the source for his 2016 multimedia work, "Secret Path".

=== Globe and Mail ===
Adams' reported for the Globe and Mail and other media, and covered international events, including the Vietnam War and the coup d'état, which overthrew Allende in Chile.

=== Novelist ===
During the 1970s and 1980s, Adams lived, worked, and traveled extensively in South and Central America, where he covered the so-called "dirty wars" of the late 20th century, leading to his novel Becoming Tania, published by McClelland and Stewart, a love story of Che Guevara and his compañera Tania who was killed with Che Guevara in the jungle of Bolivia. Adams' screenplay adaptation of the novel, Tango Duro, was nominated for the Jim Burt Prize in 2005, the Writers Guild of Canada's Best Unproduced Screenplay.

His novel, S – Portrait of a Spy, published in 1977, resulted in a libel suit in which a former RCMP Security Service officer Leslie James Bennett claimed the central character, a Soviet mole who penetrated the RCMP, was modelled after him. The publisher stopped distribution of the book despite the fact that 12,000 copies had already been sold and a deal to turn the book into a movie was cancelled as a result. The case was settled out of court with Adams paying Bennett $30,000 and agreeing to add a disclaimer to the book. The novel was adapted into a play, in 1984 by Adams and Rick Salutin.

==== Film adaptations ====
Adams and his writing partner and son, Riley Adams, have turned several of his seven published novels into movies. S – Portrait of a Spy, was scheduled for production as a feature film (by Alberta Filmworks) in spring 2006.

The Adams team with Riley as the lead writer have written screenplays for CTV, including Hunt for Justice; the original screenplay, The Clark Todd Story, (ImagiNation Films and Box Films, UK), was filmed in 2006.

His 1999 novel, Agent of Influence, based on the true story of Canadian diplomat John Watkins who died while under Royal Canadian Mounted Police interrogation, was adapted by the Adams team and aired on the CTV in 2003 and 2004. Produced by Alberta-based FilmWorks and Gala Films, Agent of Influence starred Christopher Plummer. The film was sold by Alliance-Atlantis to TV networks in 132 countries, and in 2003 was recognized by the European Screenplay Writers' association as the best foreign television screenplay.

The Adams partnership created the screenplay for the full-length feature, Bad Faith, adapted from Adams' novel of the same name and filmed in Calgary and Montreal in 2000 by Alberta FilmWorks and has been distributed globally by Oasis under the title, Cold Blooded.

Adams has written many hours of produced television for Canadian and U.S. shows.

== Bibliography ==
=== Novels ===
- The Trudeau Papers (1971) ISBN 0-7710-0052-9
- S: Portrait of a Spy (1977)
- Endgame in Paris (1979)
- Bad Faith (1983) ISBN 0-920053-12-2
- Becoming Tania (1990)
- Agent of Influence (1999) ISBN 0-7737-3123-7

=== Nonfiction ===
- The Poverty Wall (1970) (includes "Why Did Charlie Wenjack Die?") ISBN 0-7710-0051-0
- The Real Poverty Report (1971)
- Power of the Wheel - The Falun Gong Revolution (1999)

=== Plays ===
- S: Portrait of a Spy (with Rick Salutin) (1984)

== Awards ==
Adams' work Agent of Influence has received the following awards:

- Best Foreign Television Screenplay Award — given by the Les 16e Rencontres Internationales de Télévision: The Euro International Film and Television Festival held March 16–23, 2003 in Reims, France.
- Nominated for best screenplay in the Writers' Guild of Canada's 2004 MOW category.
- Nominated for best screenplay 2003 Geminis. Agent of Influence garnered five other Gemini nominations and one Gemini — Ted Whitall best supporting actor.
- Awarded a HUGOS "Certificate of Merit" in the Feature-Length Telefilm Drama category at the Chicago International Television Awards, March 2003.
