= A Brief History of Anxiety (Yours & Mine) =

2008 book by Patricia Pearson

- Author: Patricia Pearson
- Subject: Anxiety
- Publisher: Random House
- Publication date: 2008
- ISBN: 978-0-679-31498-1
- Dewey Decimal: 152.46
- LC Class: BF575.A6

A Brief History of Anxiety (Yours & Mine) (ISBN 978-0-679-31498-1) is a 2008 nonfiction book by Canadian journalist and author Patricia Pearson. It is a combination of autobiography, medical history, and social activism that discusses the author's experience with diagnosed anxiety, treatment thereof, the history of mental health treatment in general, and a veteran patient's possible objections to the nature of mental health treatment today.

== Background ==
In 2001, while working as a columnist for Canada's The National Post newspaper, Pearson was diagnosed with anxiety disorder and prescribed the anxiolytic Effexor. Pearson claims that she became addicted to this substance until missing even one dose caused her to feel "like [she] was trapped in a disco club on acid with the strobe light at maximum pulse". In a National Post column written around that time, Pearson described running out of medication at night when the pharmacy was closed and lifting up the refrigerator to see if she had dropped a tablet under there. Her psychiatrist was reportedly unsympathetic, and Pearson began to question the conventional wisdom about mental health treatment that is common among non-patients. Further setbacks in her personal life and career led her to do extensive research on mental health treatment not only today but over the past few centuries. The result was her book, published by Random House in 2008.

== Synopsis ==
The book consists of nine chapters and a section of endnotes. All of the chapters combine narrative, personal reflection, historiography, and social commentary. Pearson's style is evident in the beginning to the eighth chapter, "2001: A Drugs Odyssey":

When reason is the ultimate virtue—more prized than honor or courage or faith—there are few places that make one feel quite as deviant as a psychiatrist's waiting room. I am struck by this every time I visit the Centre for Addiction and Mental Health in downtown Toronto, housed in a stern high-rise building next to the University of Toronto campus where I earned my undergraduate history degree. Customarily, I take the elevator up to the fifth floor, and there, in addition to my psychiatrist's spacious office filled with art, is a locked ward full of humans who cannot be trusted to behave rationally. The narrow corridor that leads from the ward at the east end to Dr. K. and his colleagues at the west is a limnal space, where I move between worlds. The doctors become noble and elegant and I grow...less so. They wear their proverbial white coats, and I metaphorically sport a hospital gown with my bum showing. I can feel the balance of power shift from street level to the fifth floor as if it were a palpable change in air pressure.

— Pearson, A Brief History of Anxiety. pp.139-140

In this book, Pearson frequently challenges generally accepted layman views about mental health and mental health treatment. "The idea that people need antidepressants because they have a 'chemical imbalance' in their brains," she says at one point, "has evolved into a sort of urban legend". She states that "[t]he trouble with this soothing explanation...is that serotonin deficiency is an unsupportable claim". Pearson also challenges conventional medical wisdom: at one point, she states that, although some psychoactive medications target dopamine in the brain, over 85 percent of the body's dopamine is found outside the brain, and the medications' effect on those other tissues is almost completely unresearched.

The Notes section contains 172 references ranging from scholarly articles to the poetry of William James and the philosophical writings of Søren Kierkegaard.

== Reviews ==
The Toronto Star review writes that Pearson's psychiatrist "chose the pills carefully; she was prescribed the ones he happened to have samples of in his office". It rates the book as "excellent".

A review on the webzine More.ca, describes the book as "Part memoir, part cautionary tale, and part an investigation into the history and geography of anxiety" and states that it is "soothing".

A review in Metapsychology Online Reviews writes that the book is "a vibrant and interesting introduction to the problem of anxiety" and states that "[Pearson's] struggle with pharmacological treatments makes for sober reading".
