= For the Sake of the Children =

For The Sake Of The Children was a report issued in December, 1998, by a Special Joint Committee of The Senate and The House of Commons of Canada, addressing issues relating to parental custody of and access to children after a relationship breakdown. The report was notable for its principal recommendation that shared parenting be presumed, at first instance, to be the appropriate relationship between a child and his or her parents after a relationship breakdown. The Joint Committee was co-chaired by Senator Landon Pearson and Member of Parliament Roger Gallaway.

== See also ==
- Child custody
- Shared parenting
