= Embassy of Canada, Moscow =

Diplomatic mission of Canada to Russia

Embassy of Canada to Russia
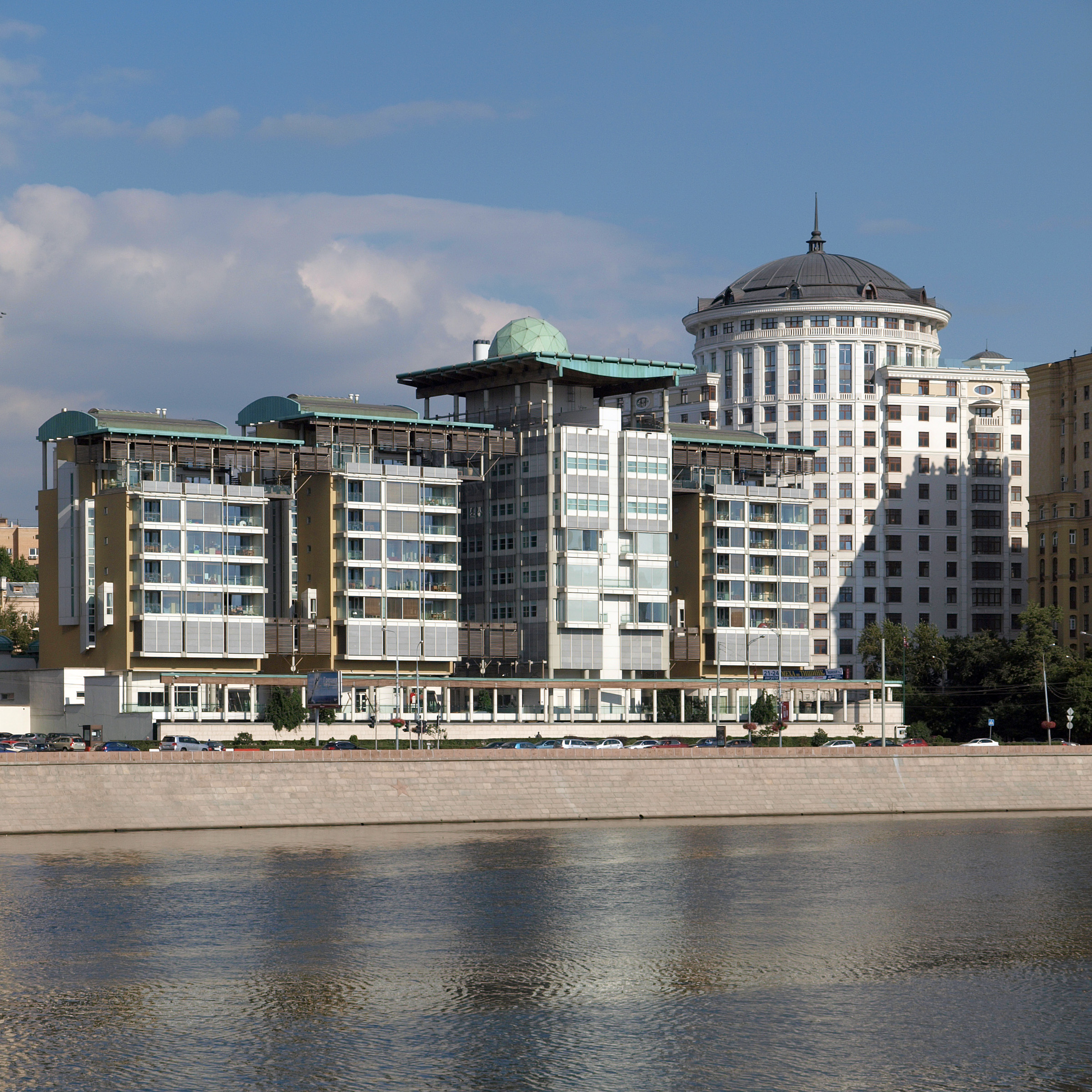
- The Canadian Embassy in Moscow
- Location: Moscow, Russia
- Address: Smolenskaya Naberezhnaya 10
- Coordinates: 55°45′01″N 37°34′37″E
- Ambassador: Robert Brookfield
- Website: Official website

The Embassy of Canada to Russia in Moscow is the diplomatic mission of Canada to Russia.

As of June 2018, to service such a vast area, the mission was staffed with 30 Canadian diplomats who were supported by 70 locally engaged personnel and a fleet of 8 vehicles. From Moscow, Canada also supports an honorary consulate in Vladivostok. A consulate general in St. Petersburg was closed in March 2007.

Previously located at 23 Starokonyushenny Pereulok (Russian: Староконюшенный переулок, 23) in the Khamovniki District of Moscow, the three-storey yellow and white Art Nouveau style chancery was decommissioned in 2020 by the Canadian government due to major structural issues of the building. As a temporary solution, the Canadian embassy will move with the British embassy at Smolenskaya Naberezhnaya 10 in Moscow.

== See also ==
- Canada–Russia relations
- List of diplomatic missions in Russia
- List of ambassadors of Canada to Russia
