= Gilles G. Brunet =

Canadian police officer

Gilles Germain Brunet
- Born: 1934
- Died: April 9, 1984 (50 years old); Montreal
- Occupation: Police officer
- Known for: After his death, Soviet officials asserted he had been a KGB mole

Sergeant Gilles G. Brunet was a career officer in Canada's Royal Canadian Mounted Police. He was born on September 20, 1934, in Rimouski. Commenced Saint Aloysisus School. He also attended A school at Côtes des Neiges and St-Nicolas School in Montreal. He attended D'Arcy McGee High School. He left school in June 1951. In Ottawa he continued school at Grade 13th at Nepean High school. In 1972 American suspicions had triggered one of Brunet's colleagues, Leslie James Bennett, to lose his security clearance, leading to his dismissal. A year after Brunet's death, a Soviet defector named Vitaly Sergeyevich Yurchenko would clear Bennett, and assert that Brunet was the mole.

Brunet was the son of Josaphat Brunet, the first director of the RCMP Security Service. According to The Fifth Estate, Gilles Brunet lived beyond his means, and made frequent trips to Mexico. His father would rise to the rank of Deputy Commissioner.

Brunet joined the RCMP Security Service in the early 1960s, and at first, seemed to show promise that would merit holding greater positions of trust. He was offered Russian Language training, and did well. He played a significant role in the conviction of Bower Featherstone, and won a promotion in 1966.

But Brunet was drinking too much, and his marriage was in trouble because his wife believed, correctly, that he was sexually unfaithful to her.

According to Secret Service: Political Policing in Canada -- from the Fenians to Fortress America, Brunet enlisted as a Soviet informant in January 1968. Later in 1968, his wife, looking for traces of his infidelities, found a $2,000 payment from the Soviets in his car. She reported the suspicious funds to the RCMP, and her report was dismissed because Brunet had warned colleagues that his jealous wife would say anything to bring him down.

Brunet betrayed Nikolai Artamonov, a Soviet who had found political asylum in the USA. After making his way to the USA, and seeking asylum, Artamonov started working with the Defense Intelligence Agency. Soviet agent Igor Kochnov approached Artamonov, and invited him to return home. While Artamonov pretended to agree, and to meet someone to handle his extraction, in Montreal, he informed his FBI handler. Because the meet was in Canada, the RCMP Security Service became involved, and Brunet told his handlers that Artamonov's negotiations to return home were a trap. No one was captured in Montreal, but the Soviets caught up with Artamonov two years later in Vienna, where he died of a drug overdose when they tried to abduct, drug and repatriate him.

Brunet was still receiving glowing performance reviews as late as 1972. In 1973, however, he and colleague Donald McCreery were fired, because it was believed they had ties to organized crime figures in Montreal. After they were fired, Brunet and McCreery founded a private security firm.

In 1977 Brunet and McCreery were key witnesses before the Royal Commission of Inquiry into Certain Activities of the RCMP. According to Crimes by the Capitalist State, the pair testified about "barn burning, the theft of documents, and 'participation and assistance to the CIA in offensive activities in Canada.'"

According to the Historical Dictionary of Air Intelligence, Brunet still had knowledge of the handling of Soviet defectors in 1978 [sic]. The book asserts Brunet told his handlers that Vladimir Vetrov had not been emphatic in rejecting recruitment efforts by the RCMP, which triggered an investigation into Vetrov's loyalty to the Soviet Union, that, in turn, triggered hard feelings that led him to leak secrets about how the Soviets covertly copied western military and technology projects to French agents.

According to Moles, Defectors, and Deceptions: James Angleton and CIA Counterintelligence, Brunet died of a heart attack shortly before the RCMP was going to interview him about whether he was a mole. In Enquêtes sur les services secrets, Normand Lester writes that he died on April 9, 1984, while he was manager of the Centennial Memorial Gardens cemetery (now Rideau Memorial Gardens) in Dollars-des-Ormeaux, a Montreal suburb.

Nigel West, in a book profiling the directors of Britain's MI6, asserted that the RCMP didn't begin investigating Brunet until their suspicions were confirmed by MI6. West claimed "SIS's contribution greatly enhanced the Service's standing across the Atlantic..."
