= Geoffrey Pearson =

Canadian diplomat

Geoffrey Pearson OC
- Pearson in 2001

4th Canadian Ambassador to the Soviet Union
- In office 1980–1983
- Prime Minister: Pierre Trudeau
- Preceded by: Robert Arthur Douglas Ford
- Succeeded by: Vernon George Turner

Canadian Ambassador to Mongolia
- In office 1980–1981
- Prime Minister: Pierre Trudeau
- Preceded by: Robert Arthur Douglas Ford

Personal details
- Born: Geoffrey Arthur Holland Pearson; December 24, 1927 Toronto, Ontario, Canada
- Died: March 18, 2008 (aged 80) Ottawa, Ontario, Canada
- Spouse: Lucy Landon Carter Mackenzie (m. 1951)
- Children: 5, including Patricia Pearson
- Parent(s): Lester B. Pearson; Maryon Moody
- Education: University of Toronto; University of Oxford
- Profession: Diplomat; author

Geoffrey Arthur Holland Pearson OC (December 24, 1927 – March 18, 2008) was a Canadian diplomat and author. He was the son of former Prime Minister of Canada Lester B. Pearson and Maryon Pearson.

== Biography ==
Born in Toronto, Pearson was educated at Trinity College School in Port Hope, Ontario, the University of Toronto, and the University of Oxford.

Pearson joined the Department of External Affairs (now called Global Affairs Canada) in 1952, being the second of three members of his family to serve in Canada's diplomatic service. His father was Secretary of State for External Affairs and his son, Michael, would be a senior civil servant.

He held diplomatic appointments at the Canadian embassies in Paris and Mexico City, and at the High Commission in New Delhi. From 1980 to 1983, he served as Canada's ambassador to the Soviet Union. He was also Ambassador to Mongolia from 1980 to 1981.

In late 1983, Pearson was appointed as a special representative for arms control to then-Prime Minister Pierre Trudeau, and in 1984 he was seconded to the Canadian Institute of International Affairs. In January 1985, he was appointed as the first executive director of the Canadian Institute for International Peace and Security, where he served for six years. In 1996, his book Seize the Day was published, chronicling his father's diplomatic legacy. Pearson was a past president of the United Nations Association in Canada. In 2000, he was made an Officer of the Order of Canada.

Pearson died in Ottawa, Ontario, on March 18, 2008. He was survived by his wife, Senator Landon Pearson (served 1994–2005), and their five children—Patricia, Michael (former diplomat and official with Fisheries and Oceans Canada), Hilary, Anne, and Katherine.

== Published works ==
- Pearson, Geoffrey A.H. (1993). Seize the Day: Lester B. Pearson and Crisis Diplomacy. Carleton University Press. ISBN 978-0886292171.
