= Canada–Russia relations =

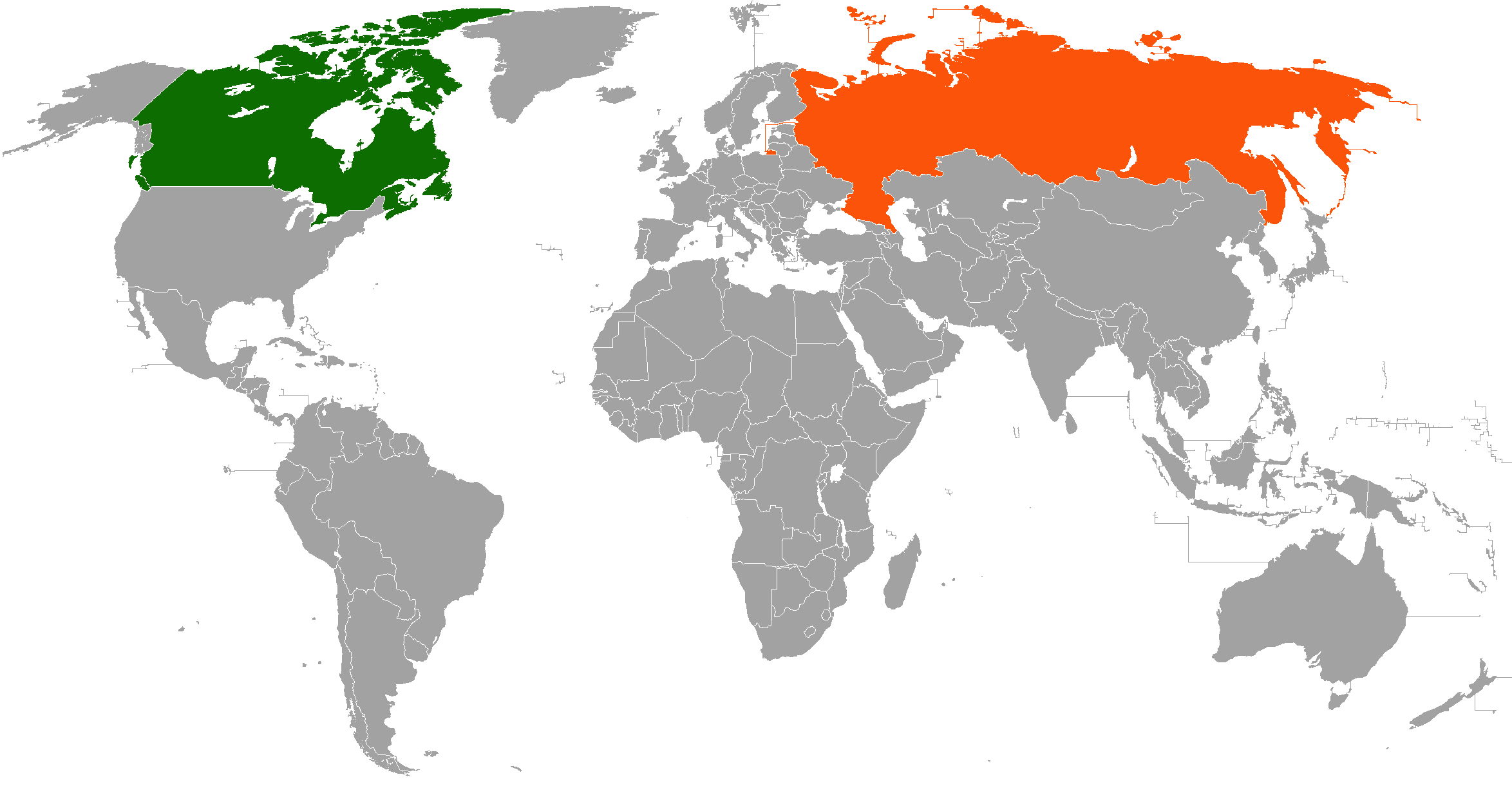

- Canada: Russia

Diplomatic mission
- Canadian Embassy, Moscow: Russian Embassy, Ottawa

Envoy
- Ambassador of Canada to Russia Sarah Taylor: Ambassador of Russia to Canada Oleg Stepanov

Canada and Russia have longstanding bilateral relations (previously between Canada and the Soviet Union). As vast northern countries, Canada and Russia share some interests and cooperative policies. However, the open and democratic political system of Canada contrasts with the closed Russian system, as was the case during the communist era of the Soviet Union (USSR).

Under the Presidency of Vladimir Putin, the Canadian government has routinely criticized the erosion of Russian democracy, persistent human rights abuses, and hostile foreign policy towards Canada and its NATO allies. In 2014, relations significantly deteriorated as a result of the Russian annexation of Crimea and Russian involvement in the War in Donbas. Relations between Russia and Canada reached a state of near-total collapse after the 2022 Russian invasion of Ukraine.

Some commentators argue that Russia-Canada relations since 2014 are more hostile and confrontational than at any point during the Cold War.

== History ==
=== Background ===
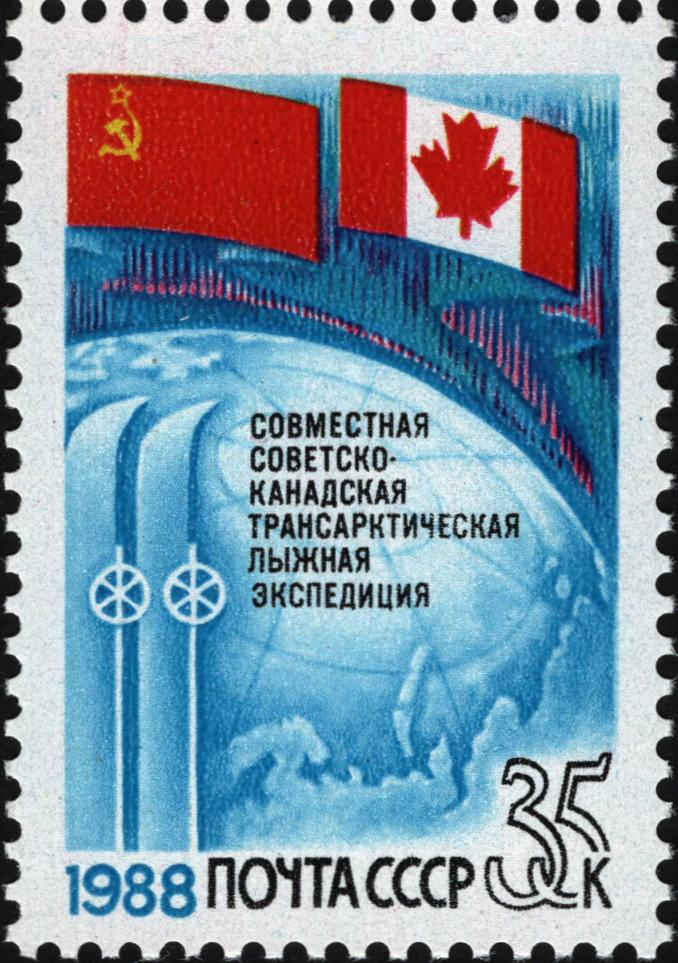
A 1988 Soviet stamp commemorating the Soviet–Canadian polar expedition

As part of the British Empire, Canada did not establish a foreign ministry (External Affairs) until 1909 and developed an independent foreign policy only after the Bolshevik Revolution of 1917 and the creation of the USSR.

In 1931, Canada imposed an embargo on certain Soviet goods. The embargo was a response to the fact that the Soviet government had previously cut trade relations with Canada. This trade war between the USSR and Canada lasted until 1936.

Diplomatic relations between the two countries were finally established on June 12, 1942, during World War II, when Canada joined the United Kingdom and other Western democratic countries in alliance with the Soviet Union against the Axis powers following the German invasion of the Soviet Union. During the Cold War, Canada was part of the democratic Western bloc and NATO in opposition to the Soviet-led Warsaw Pact.

Compared to the United States and the United Kingdom, Canadian policy towards the Soviet Union was less confrontational, in part because Canada was not a nuclear power (without on-land nuclear warheads). In 1991, Canada was the first major Western country to recognize the independence of the Baltic states and Ukraine, which helped to cement their international legitimacy and formalize the end of the Soviet Union. Canada and post-Soviet Russia established relations in 1992.

=== Relations since 1991 Soviet dissolution ===
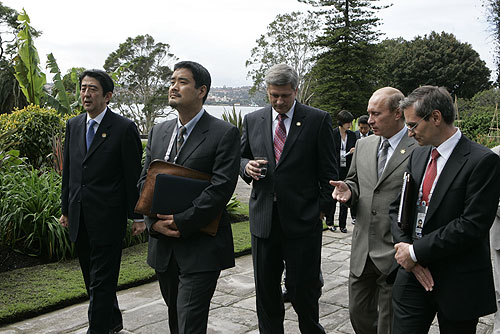
Canadian prime minister Stephen Harper and Russian president Vladimir Putin with other APEC dignitaries, September 2007

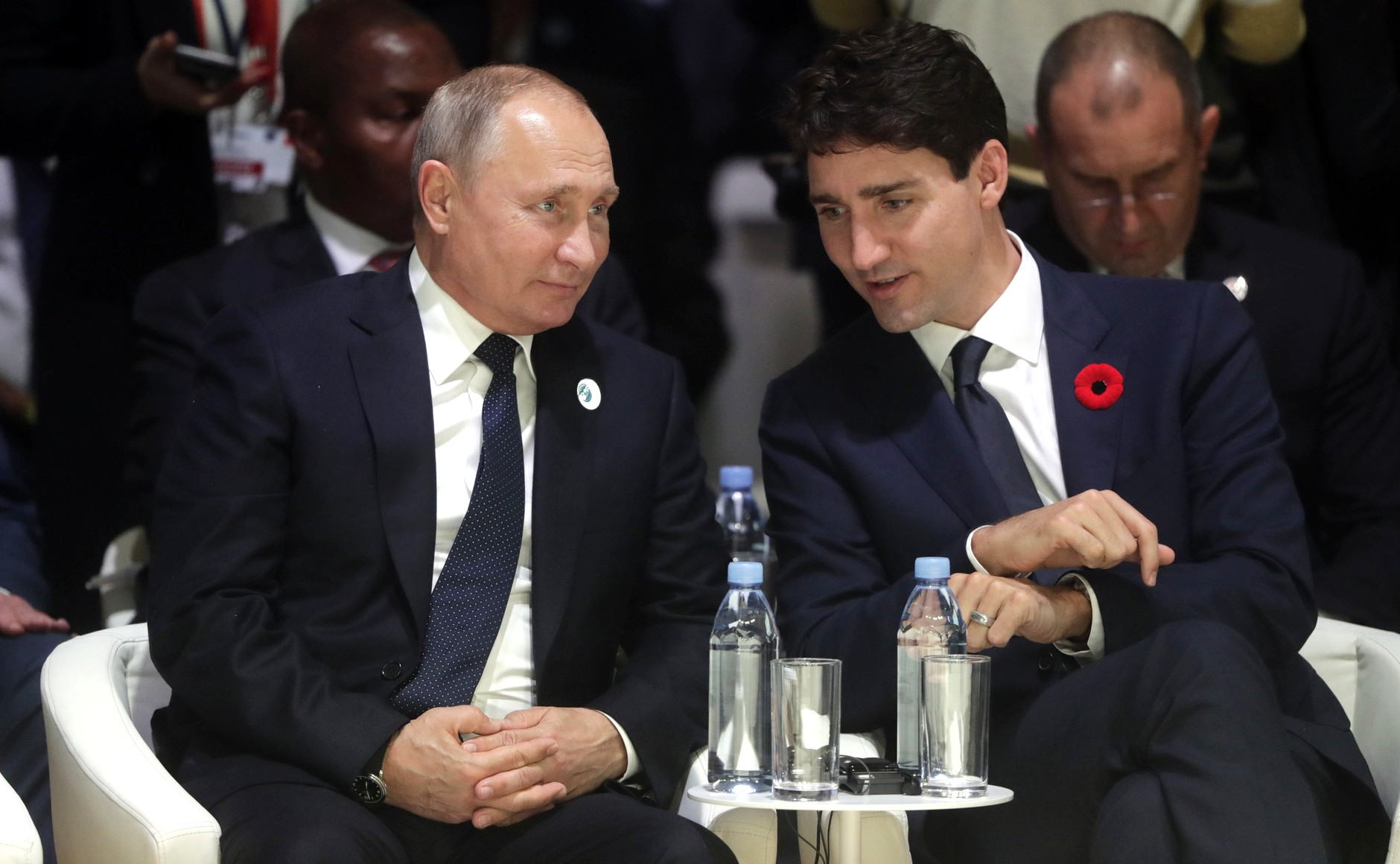
Canadian prime minister Justin Trudeau and Russian president Putin at the 2018 Paris Peace Forum

Meetings between Canadian and Russian representatives regularly occur at the highest levels. Prime Minister Stephen Harper and President Vladimir Putin met for the second time at the G8 Summit in Heiligendamm. They first met at the G8 Summit in St. Petersburg in 2006 in which they issued joint statements on Canada-Russia Relations and Canada-Russia Energy Cooperation.

Canada and Russia maintain regular political dialogue on security, counter-terrorism and global issues. This dialogue has been incorporated into the Global Security Talks, which allow high-level officials to share concerns and solutions on non-proliferation, regional issues and defence relations. Canada's major security undertaking with Russia is the leading role in the Global Partnership Against the Spread of Weapons and Materials of Mass Destruction, a G8 initiative first proposed at Kananaskis. This programme had a budget of up to $25 billion over twenty years.

On 12 June 2007, Canada and Russia marked the 65th anniversary of the establishment of diplomatic relations.

=== Deterioration since Russo-Ukrainian conflict ===
Canada is on Russia's "Unfriendly Countries List" (red). Countries and territories on the list have imposed or joined sanctions against Russia.

Relations between Canada and Russia deteriorated rapidly after the 2014 annexation of Crimea by the Russian Federation. In response to the annexation, Canada imposed sanctions on Russian officials. On March 3, 2014, the Canadian House of Commons passed a unanimous motion condemning Russia's intervention in Crimea.

According to a 2017 Pew Global Attitudes Project survey, 27% of Canadians have a favourable view of Russia, with 59% expressing an unfavourable view.

As of December 2020, Canadian public opinion on Vladimir Putin and Russia remains highly negative, with 62% of Canadians holding an unfavourable view of Russia.

On 1 February 2022 rumours of open conflict were thick and a helpful list of Canadian sanctions tools was provided by consultant attorneys. There were then three pieces of secondary legislation that collectively formed the "Sanctions Regime", under the Special Economic Measures Act:

- Special Economic Measures (Russia) Regulations (SEMRR)
- Special Economic Measures (Ukraine) Regulations (SEMUR)
- Freezing Assets of Corrupt Foreign Officials (Ukraine) Regulations (FACFOUR)

Relations remained frosty until February 24, 2022, when they turned openly hostile after the 2022 Russian invasion of Ukraine. Canada's government condemned the invasion, imposed punitive sanctions on Russian officials, banned Russian aircraft from its airspace, and imposed a total ban on Russian oil imports in response to the invasion.

On 27 April 2022, Canadian lawmakers in the House of Commons voted to recognize Russia's actions in Ukraine as genocide. In response to the sanctions from Canada, Russia banned many Canadian officials from entering the country, including Prime Minister Justin Trudeau and several provincial premiers.

On May 8, Russia placed Canada on a list of "unfriendly countries", along with Taiwan, South Korea, Japan, Singapore, the United States, European Union members, NATO members (except Turkey), Australia, New Zealand, Switzerland, Micronesia and Ukraine.

The Canadian authorities do not intend to develop cooperation with Russia in the Arctic. This was announced on March 28, 2025, by newly inaugurated Canadian Prime Minister Mark Carney during a conversation with reporters in Montreal.

On 16 June 2026, Russia imposed entry bans on 103 Canadian citizens in response to new Canadian sanctions against Russia. The Russian Foreign Ministry said those banned included members of parliament and other officials, and accused them of activities aimed at undermining Russia’s constitutional system and foreign policy. Earlier the same day, Canada had announced sanctions targeting Russia’s shadow fleet, energy revenues, defense sector, and entities linked to disinformation.

== Cultural relations ==
Culture has a high profile in Russia, where a rapidly developing market presents new opportunities for Canadian cultural goods and services. Specialized film festivals, book fairs, cultural expos, performances and exhibitions are widely attended and are seen as a conduit of social values. Canada's cultural relations with Russia are increasingly vibrant, particularly following former Governor General Adrienne Clarkson's state visit to Russia in the fall of 2003, when a delegation of prominent Canadians in the cultural field established lasting contacts with their Russian counterparts.

Music of Russian romantic composers - notably Tchaikovsky, Mussorgsky, Rachmaninoff and, to a lesser degree, Glinka, Borodin, Rimsky-Korsakov, Scriabin, and Glazunov - has been extremely popular with Canadian audiences in the 20th century. The expatriate Stravinsky has been the dominant figure of Russian music after 1900, but several Soviet composers - notably Prokofiev, Shostakovich, and, less often, Kabalevsky - have been represented steadily on Canadian programs. Kabalevsky visited Canada in 1978 (and several times previously), but by that year neither early nor recent works of Canadian composers had been adopted into the Soviet repertoire, though Canadian artists occasionally had performed such works on visits to the USSR. Overtures have been made. In the fall of 1977, the composer Harry Somers and the Canadian Music Centre's John Peter Lee Roberts spent two weeks in the USSR meeting members of the Union of Soviet Composers, performers, and critics, and playing for them recordings of Canadian works. In 1978, in exchange, the Soviet composer and the pianist Andrei Eshpai visited the CMCentre.

In 2004, the State Hermitage Museum in St. Petersburg hosted works by Tom Thomson, the first exhibition devoted to a Canadian artist at the Hermitage. The Hermitage also had a very successful Jean-Paul Riopelle exhibit in the summer of 2006. In 2007 artist Jeff Wall exhibited at the Moscow Art Biennale in February; and over 40 nights of Canadian theatrical performances in Russia were staged by Robert Lepage, Compagnie Marie Chouinard, Cirque Eloize and Theatre Smith-Gilmour at the Chekhov Theatre Festival. The year 2007 also marks the 50th anniversary of Glenn Gould's tour of the Soviet Union in 1957.

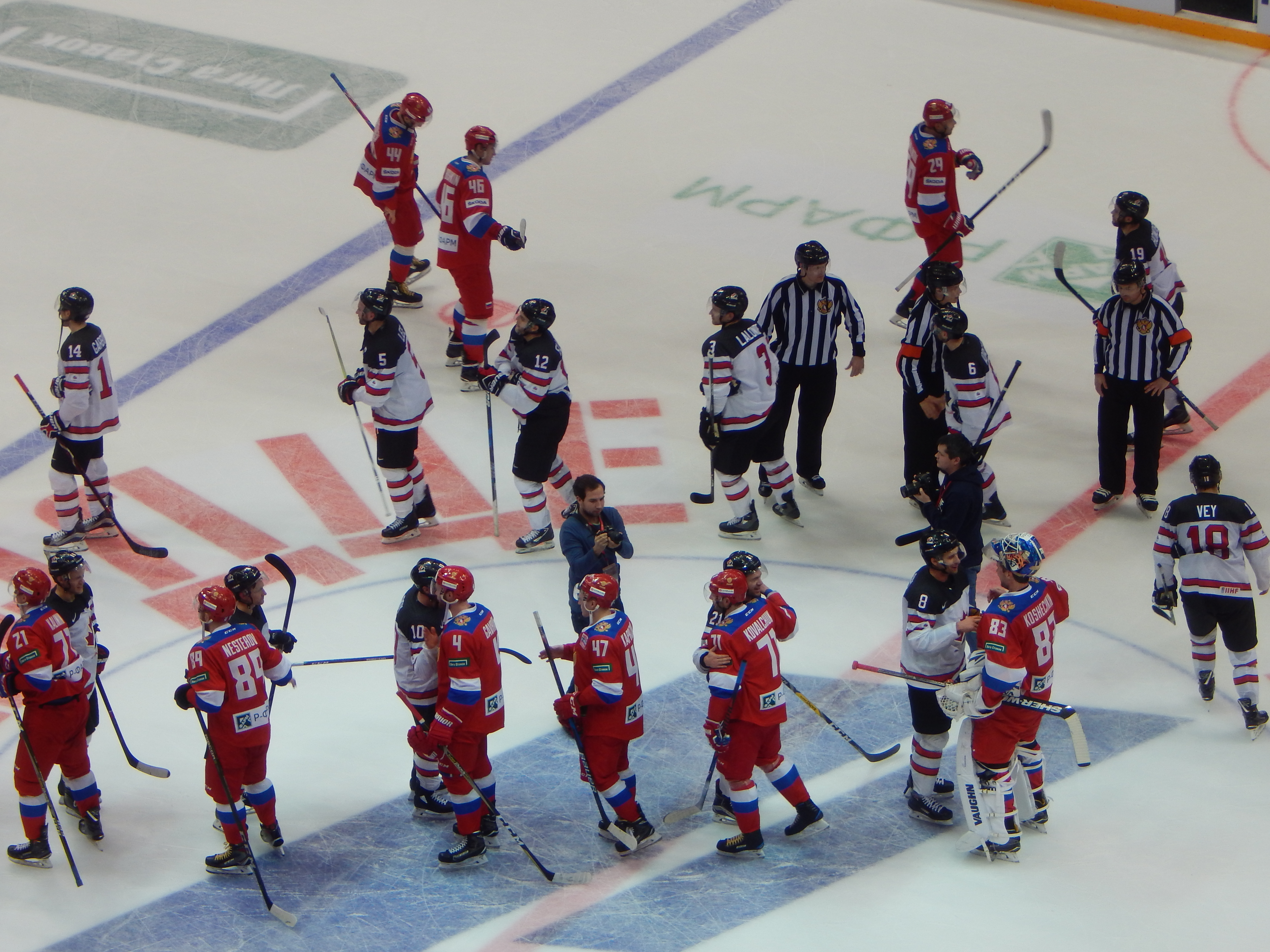
Canadian and Russian ice hockey players shake hands after a game for the 2017 Channel One Cup

Canada and Russia share an ice hockey rivalry, resulting in a number of events played between their national ice hockey teams; including the 1972 Summit Series, and the 1974 Summit Series. The CHL Canada/Russia Series, a junior ice hockey tournament between players of the Canadian Hockey League and a select team from Russia, has been played annually since 2003.

== Economic relations ==
Growing domestic demand combined with vast natural resource wealth had made Russia a prime destination for the export of Canadian goods and services and for new Canadian foreign direct investment. To help facilitate closer economic ties between Canada and Russia, the governments of both countries participated in the Canada-Russia Intergovernmental Economic Commission (IEC). Working groups were active year-round in the areas of agri-food and agriculture, fuel and energy, construction and housing, mining, and the Arctic and North. This all changed when on 24 February 2022 Russia invaded Ukraine. Since then "Canada has suspended [its] bilateral cooperation with Russia, and maintains only limited engagement with Russia in multilateral forums".

=== Pre-invasion ===
The first-ever Canada-Russia Business Summit, organized jointly by Canada Eurasia Russia Business Association (CERBA) and the Russian Union of Industrialists and Entrepreneurs (RSPP), was held March 26–27, 2007, in Ottawa. This event successfully combined the 6th session of the Canada-Russia IEC, co-chaired by Minister Emerson and Russian Agriculture Minister Alexey Gordeyev, and the second meeting of the Canada-Russia Business Council (CRBC). Interest and attendance from both sides were high with over 300 participants including special guest Vladislav Tretiak, the famed Russian ice hockey goalie in the 1972 Summit Series, then a Duma member and co-chair of the Canada Russia Parliamentary Friendship Group.

A Canada-Russia Business Summit was organized in Ottawa on 1 June 2011 by CERBA, in coordination with the Government of Canada and the Government of Russia. The event was co-chaired on the government level by the Russian First Deputy Prime Minister Viktor Zubkov and the Canadian Minister of International Trade Edward Fast. The event brought together CEOs from major Canadian players in the Russian market as well as shareholders and top management from their leading Russian partners, who discussed bilateral trade and investment issues. June 1 was a prelude to the meetings of the Intergovernmental Economic Commission (IEC) on June 2. From the Russian side, among participants in the council were: H.E. Georgiy Mamedov, Ambassador of the Russian Federation to Canada; O. Betin, Head of the Tambov Oblast Administration; A. Krasnov, Executive Vice-president of the Organizing Committee of the Olympic Games "Sochi 2014"; A. Dzhordzhadze, Deputy CEO, "2018 FIFA World Cup in Russia"; A. Tikhonov, First Deputy Chairman of the Board Vnesheconombank; A. Varichev, General Director of Holding Company METALLOINVEST JSC; Y. Kotliarov, General Manager, Moscow Branch Office, SNC-Lavalin; A. Sitnikov, SKOLKOVO; M. Lachinov, "Russian Venture Company"; D. Akhanov, RUSNANO and other representatives of government authorities and business circles. Among participants from Canada were: Joan Sloan, the Canadian Ambassador to the Russian Federation; Edward Fast, Minister of International Trade; Gerry Ritz, Minister of Agricultural; Nathan Hunt, Chairman of the National Board CERBA; David Paterson, vice-president of RIM-Blackberry; Chris Erickson, Partner of the Pangaea Ventures Ltd.; Andrew Cranston, Managing Partner KPMG; David Aylen, Managing Partner of the Gowlings International Inc.; Isabelle Des Chenes, vice-president of the Forest Products Association of Canada; Michael McAdoo, vice-president of the Bombardier Inc. and other representatives of government authorities and business circles. A significant number of positive developments occurred on both June 1 and 2 including partnerships and perspective agreements in the nanotechnology industry, aerospace, energy efficiency, construction, innovation and sports infrastructure.

=== Post-invasion ===
As of June 2022, due to Russia invading Ukraine on the 24th of February 2022, Canada has imposed economic sanctions on Russia that will ban Canada from exporting services related to Russia's oil, gas, and chemical industries. These sanctions will act to have pressure to vacate territory that Canada recognizes as Ukrainian and occupied by Russian forces.

== Diplomatic relations ==
=== Membership in international organizations ===
Both countries cooperate in a number of bilateral and multilateral programs including the UN, APEC, and NATO-Russia Council. Active bilateral cooperation between the two countries began more than 35 years ago. Through the Arctic and North Working Group of the Canada-Russia IEC, both countries work together to develop a forward-looking agenda on northern cooperation. The Canadian International Development Agency's Russia Program, established in 1991, is a concrete demonstration of Canada's long-term commitment to assist the process of reform and transition in Russia. The overall goal of the programme is to support the establishment of a stable, prosperous and democratic Russia with a well-developed market economy and efficient, responsive institutions. Yes.

Both countries are also members of the Organization for Security and Co-operation in Europe and the International Ice Hockey Federation in which both states enjoyed a rivalry in ice hockey.

== Russian intelligence operations in Canada ==
Operations that have been documented include:

- According to Christopher Andrew's and Vasili Mitrokhin's book based on the Mitrokhin archive, the USSR's KGB probably established contact with Canadian terrorist group Front de libération du Québec (FLQ). John Barron also mentions an agreement between KGB and Cuba, referring to the FLQ in April 1970.

Hugh Hambleton was established in Quebec in 1964 when Quebec established closer relations with France.

- The KGB was concerned that FLQ's terrorist attacks could be linked to the Soviet Union. It designed a disinformation campaign and forged documents to portray FLQ as a CIA false flag operation. A photocopy of the forged "CIA document" was "leaked" to Montreal Star in September 1971. The operation was so successful that Canada's Prime Minister believed that the CIA had conducted operations in Canada. The story was still quoted in the 1990s, even among academic authors.
- Russian government agents have a record of using Canadian passports and identities (either genuine, or false), as, in recent history, evidenced by the cases of Elena Miller, 'Paul Hampel' (2006) and some members of the group of Russian sleeper agents ("Illegals Program") arrested in the US June 2010. One of the best-known Soviet 'illegals' to have used a stolen Canadian identity as his cover for conducting espionage in the UK was Konon Molody (Gordon Arnold Lonsdale; 1922–1970).

== Resident diplomatic missions ==
of Canada in Russia

- Moscow (Embassy)

of Russia in Canada

- Ottawa (Embassy)
- Montreal (Consulate-General)
- Toronto (Consulate-General)

Building hosting the Embassy of Canada in Moscow

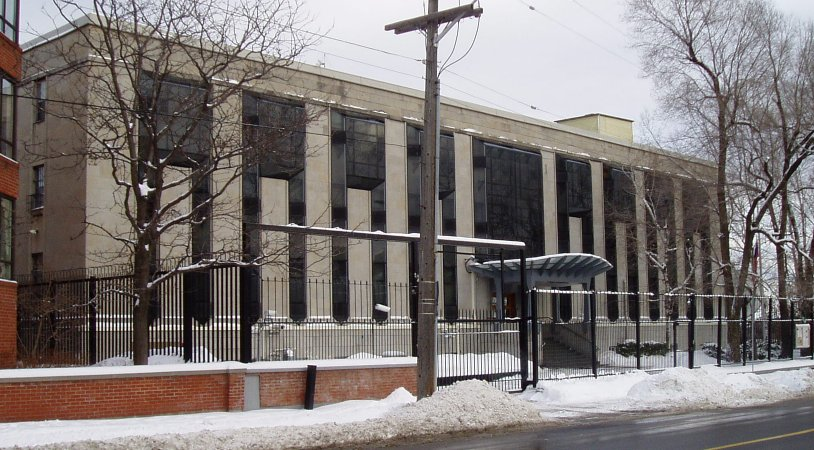
Embassy of Russia in Ottawa

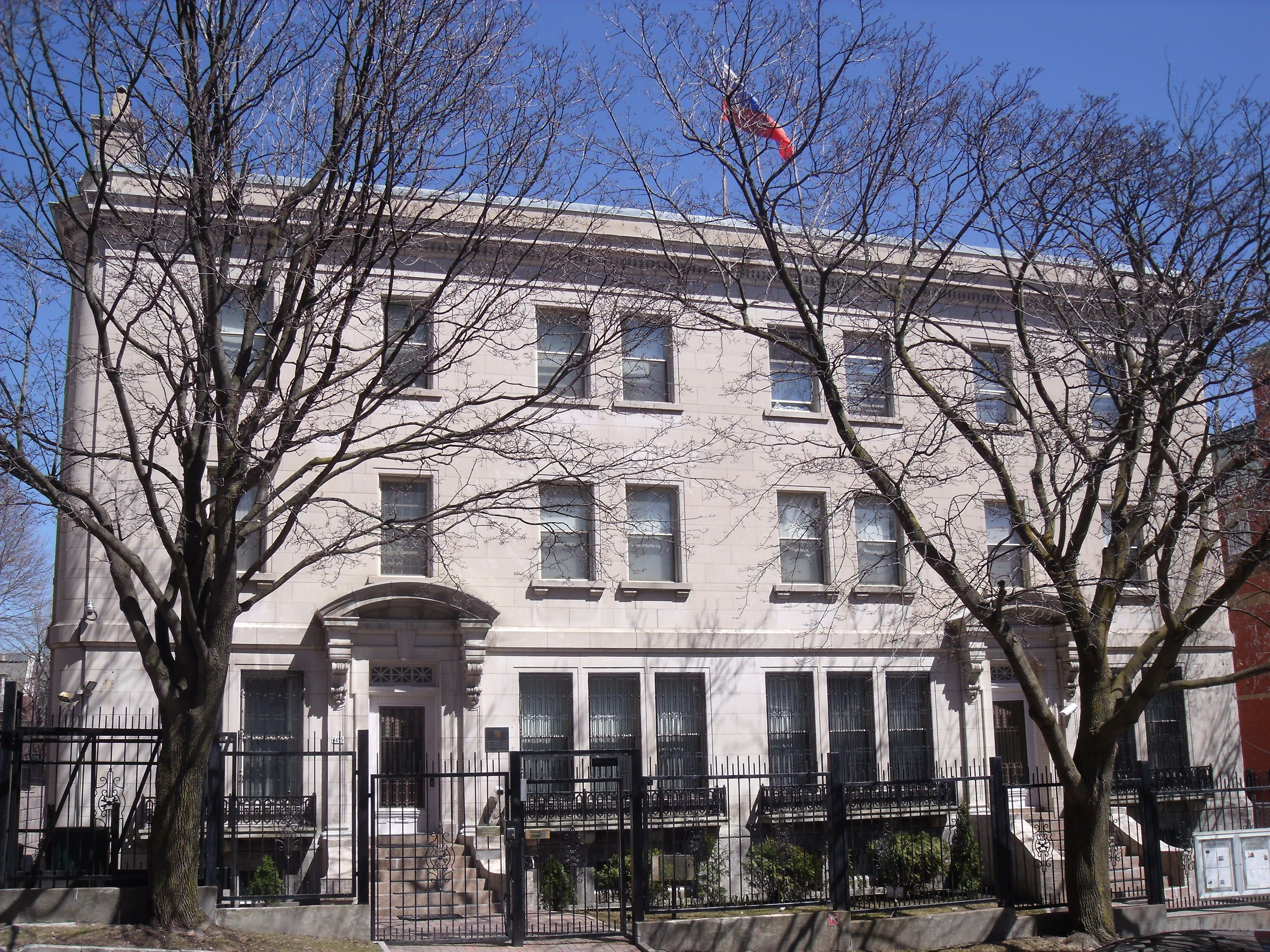
Consulate-General of Russia in Montreal

== See also ==
- Foreign relations of Canada
- Foreign relations of Russia
- Russian Canadians
- Canada–Soviet Union relations
