= Maryon Pearson =

Canadian political spouse (1901–1989)

- Maryon Pearson in 1964
- Born: Maryon Elspeth Moody; December 13, 1901; Winnipeg, Manitoba, Canada
- Died: December 26, 1989 (aged 88); Toronto, Ontario, Canada
- Known for: Spouse of the Prime Minister of Canada
- Spouse: Lester B. Pearson (m. 1925; died 1972)
- Children: 2, including Geoffrey Pearson

Maryon Elspeth Pearson (née Moody; December 13, 1901 – December 26, 1989) was the wife of Lester B. Pearson, the 14th Prime Minister of Canada.

== Life ==
Maryon Elspeth Moody was born in Winnipeg, Manitoba, on December 13, 1901. Her father was a doctor and her mother was superintendent of nurses at a hospital.

Maryon and Lester Pearson met at the University of Toronto, where he was a teacher and she was a student. The two married on August 22, 1925.

They had one son, Geoffrey, and one daughter, Patricia. Geoffrey was married to former Canadian Senator Landon Pearson. Geoffrey and Landon's daughter is USA Today journalist Patricia Pearson (not to be confused with her aunt, of the same name, who did not maintain a public career).

== Reputation ==
Maryon Pearson was best known for her sharp-tongued wit, developing a reputation as an outspoken figure who freely spoke her mind and had little use for the demure and quiet image fostered by many wives of previous prime ministers.

It was reportedly also at Maryon Pearson's behest that the practice of curtseying to the Governor General and his consort was discontinued—apparently because Pearson refused to act deferentially toward her longtime friend Norah Michener.

Among her most famous quotations:

"Behind every successful man, there stands a surprised woman."

"We lost everything. We even won our own constituency."

"The big problem is to find suitable hats. I don't care for them all that much, but you have to wear them in politics."

On the retired former prime minister's greater time at home: "I married him for better or worse. I didn't marry him for lunch."

On being asked during an election campaign by a reporter, "Is there anything you'd like to bring up, Mrs. Pearson?": "Yes, three doughnuts and six cups of coffee."

On being asked for her opinion of a speech given by Lester: "You missed several opportunities to sit down."

== See also ==
- Spouse of the prime minister of Canada
