= John Wendell Holmes =

Canadian diplomat and academic

John Holmes OC FRSC

Canadian Ambassador to the United Nations
- In office January 1950 – June 1950
- Preceded by: Andrew McNaughton
- Succeeded by: Robert Gerald Riddell

Personal details
- Born: 18 June 1910 London, Ontario, Canada
- Died: 13 August 1988 (aged 78) London, Ontario, Canada

John Wendell Holmes OC FRSC (18 June 1910 – 13 August 1988) was a Canadian diplomat and academic.

== Background ==
Born in London, Ontario, Holmes attended the University of Western Ontario and received a Master of Arts degree from the University of Toronto. From 1933 to 1938, he was a master of English at Pickering College. From 1938 to 1940, he attended the University of London. He joined the Department of External Affairs in 1943 as a temporary wartime assistant.

From 1947 to 1948, he was the Canadian Chargé d'Affaires ad interim to the Soviet Union. In 1950, he was appointed Acting Permanent Delegate to the United Nations. He became Assistant Under-Secretary of State for External Affairs in 1953 where he remained until he was forced to resign from the department, in 1960, after admitting to being a homosexual. From 1960 to 1973, Holmes was president (later called director-general) of the Canadian Institute of International Affairs, a non-partisan, non-profit, and non-governmental organization for the discussion and analysis of international affairs.

Holmes was among hundreds of federal civil servants who were targeted in an RCMP homosexual witch hunt that intensified in 1958 and continued through to the mid-1990s, destroying lives, careers and families.

From 1971 to 1981, he was a professor of international relations at York University, Glendon College. From 1967 until his death, he was a visiting professor of international relations at the University of Toronto. He was also a visiting professor of history at the University of Leeds in 1979 and 1985.

He was the author of Life with Uncle: the Canadian-American Relationship (1981) and The Shaping of Peace: Canada and the Search for World Order 1943-1957 (2 volumes, 1979 and 1982). In 1986, he was awarded the Royal Society of Canada's J. B. Tyrrell Historical Medal in recognition of these volumes.

In 1969, he was made an Officer of the Order of Canada. He was a Fellow of the Royal Society of Canada and the recipient of 10 honorary doctorates.
