= Leslie E. Norton =

Canadian diplomat

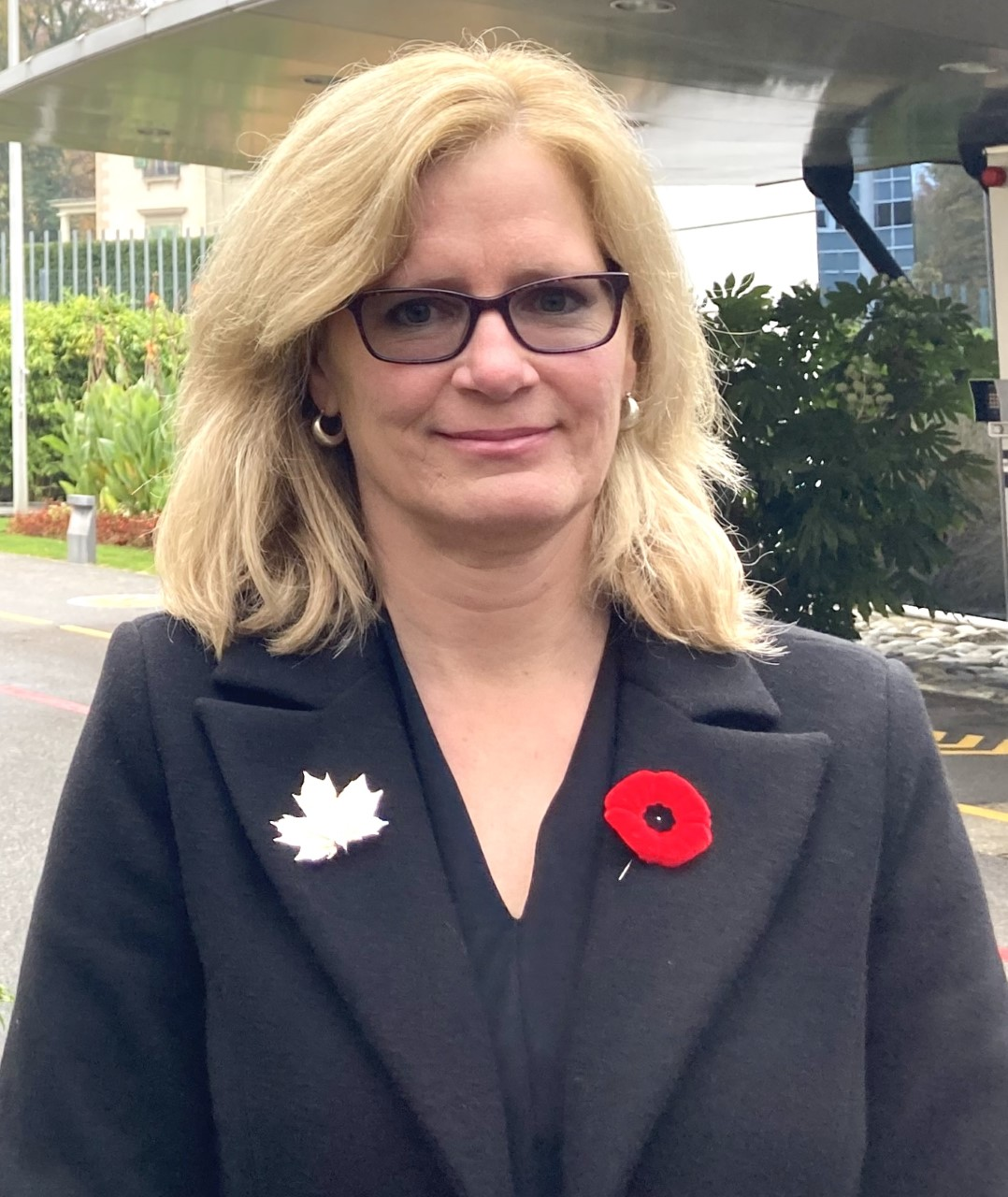

Leslie E. Norton is the former Permanent Representative of Canada to the United Nations and the Conference on Disarmament in Geneva, Switzerland having presented her credentials on October 9, 2019. She succeeded Rosemary McCarney in the role, and was replaced by Peter MacDougall in 2024.

== Life ==
Norton earned a master's degree in international relations from Laval University (1992); a bachelor's degree in English and French literature from the University of Western Ontario (1988); and a diploma in civilization and literature from Aix-Marseille III University (1985).

Norton began her career in the Department of Foreign Affairs and International Trade (DFAIT) and then worked for many years at the Canadian International Development Agency (CIDA) in Africa, Asia and Multilateral branches She worked in Bangladesh and at the Permanent Mission of Canada in Geneva. At CIDA's Headquarters in Ottawa, she was the director of the International Humanitarian Assistance and Food Aid unit from 2006. In 2008 she was the director of the Humanitarian Affairs and Disaster Response Group at DFAIT until 2009.

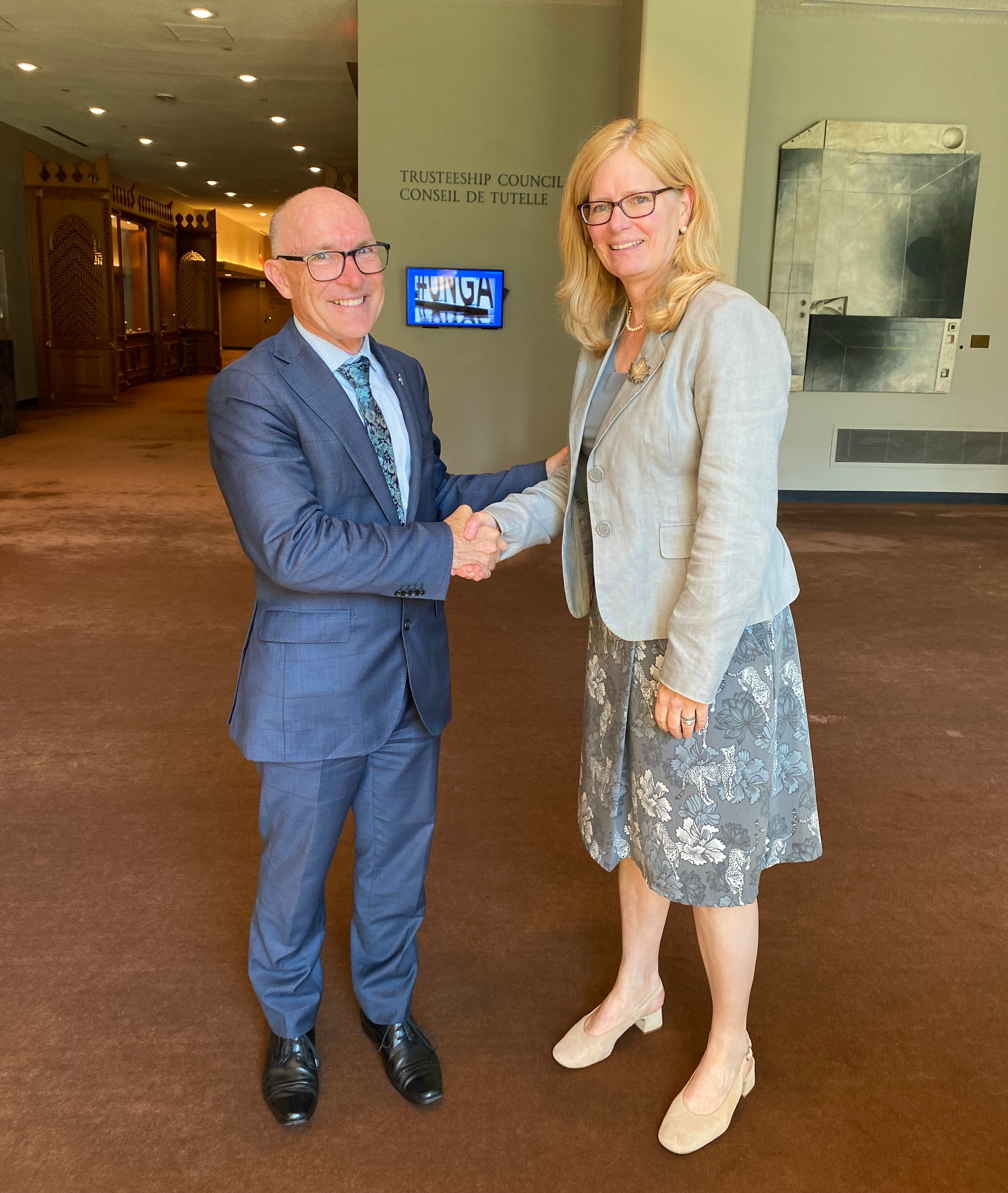
CTBTO Executive Secretary Robert Floyd and Leslie E. Norton in 2022

She served as director general of the International Humanitarian Assistance Bureau from 2009 until she became the director general of the Southern and Eastern Africa Bureau in 2015. In the following year she became the assistant deputy minister of Sub-Saharan Africa Branch which she did until August 2019 when she became the Permanent Representative of Canada to the United Nations and the Conference on Disarmament in Geneva.

In June 2021 she presented a plea to the United Nations Human Rights Council for China to be open about the state of Uyghur Muslims living in the north west of China. It was signed by the representatives of over forty nations including the United States.
