= S – Portrait of a Spy =

1978 spy novel

S: Portrait of a Spy is a controversial 1978 spy novel by Canadian writer Ian Adams. Adams was sued by a former counter-intelligence official on the grounds the novel's main character bore too close a resemblance to his own life. Former Minister of National Defence Paul Hellyer wrote that information in the novel seemed sufficiently credible to alter the mandate of a high-profile inquiry into wrongdoing by the RCMP Security Service.

== Synopsis ==
In the novel S is employed as the Royal Canadian Mounted Police's official in charge of countering attempts by the Soviet Union to spy on Canada. In the novel S is a triple agent—a Soviet mole who has been recruited by the United States's Central Intelligence Agency. S has a long run, decades, as a successful spy. When his run does come to an end, he manages to evade Canadian authorities, and leave Canada.

== Peter Worthington and James Leslie Bennett ==
Shortly after the novel was written Peter Worthington, a founding editor of the Toronto Sun, wrote to Leslie James Bennett, that he thought Bennett should consider suing Adams, as the novel too closely paralleled his own life. Worthington told Bennett that the character of the publisher of a tabloid newspaper had enough parallels that he could sue Adams. He told Bennett his lawyer, Julian Porter, thought Bennett had grounds to sue.

Bennett did sue Adams. According to the Windsor Star Bennett was surprised to learn that it was a column by Worthington himself which first suggested the character of S was based on Bennett.

== Paul Hellyer's review ==
In a 1977 review Paul Hellyer, a former Minister of National Defence, suggested other characters were strongly based on John Starnes, Bennett's boss, Solicitor General Jean-Pierre Goyer, Karl Kristian Ring, who he identifies as an arms dealer. Hellyer suggested he may have been the model for another character, Hellyer suggested the information in the novel was so explosive that the mandate of the MacDonald Commission that was then investigating wrongdoing on the part of the RCMP Security Service should be expanded to confirm or refute whether clandestine wrongdoing described in the novel actually took place.

== Play and film ==
Rick Salutin would later write an essay on the trial, which was published together with the novel in a second edition. In 1984 Adams and Salutin collaborated on a play based on the novel. A script for a feature film based on the book is in development.
