= Canada–Soviet Union relations =

Canada-Soviet Union relations
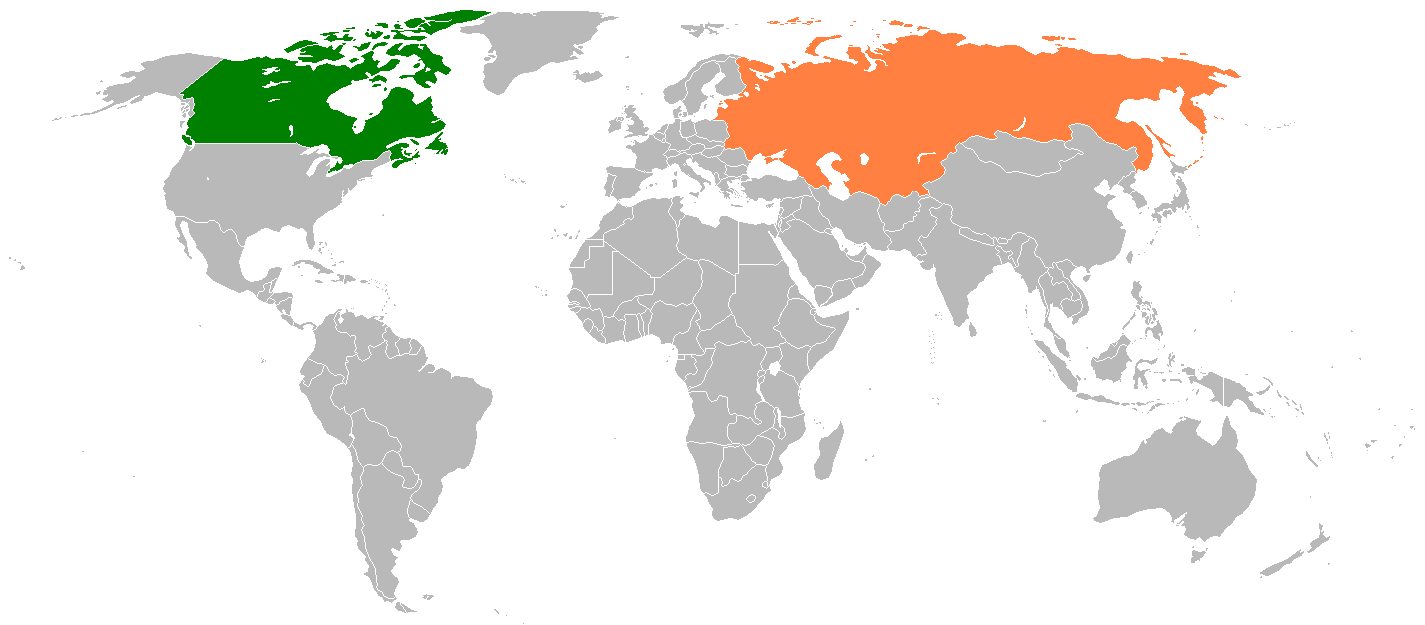

- Canada: Soviet Union

Canada and the Union of Soviet Socialist Republics (USSR or Soviet Union) had diplomatic relations from 1923 to 1927 and from 1941 until the USSR's dissolution in 1991. The relationship was often tense, owing to the Cold War and Canada's membership in NATO.

== Diplomatic history ==
=== Early phase ===
Early Canada-Soviet relations proved to be tumultuous. Canada had participated in the Allied intervention in the Russian Civil War, and in general mirrored the hostility towards the Soviet Union demonstrated from Washington and London. Canadian authorities suspected Soviet involvement in Canadian labour disturbances such as the Winnipeg General Strike of 1919. Nevertheless, Canada adhered to the Anglo-Soviet Trade Agreement of 1921, which meant de facto recognition of the Soviet Union. Two years later, the Soviet Union sent its first trade representative to Canada. Relations were severed after the Arcos Affair in 1927. Limited relations were restored in 1929.

The Canadian government suspected Soviet involvement in the Regina Riot of 1935, while Canada was the subject of unflattering propaganda in the Soviet Union, and subject to the popular front policy. Besides this, Canada had limited powers over her own foreign affairs until the Statute of Westminster 1931.

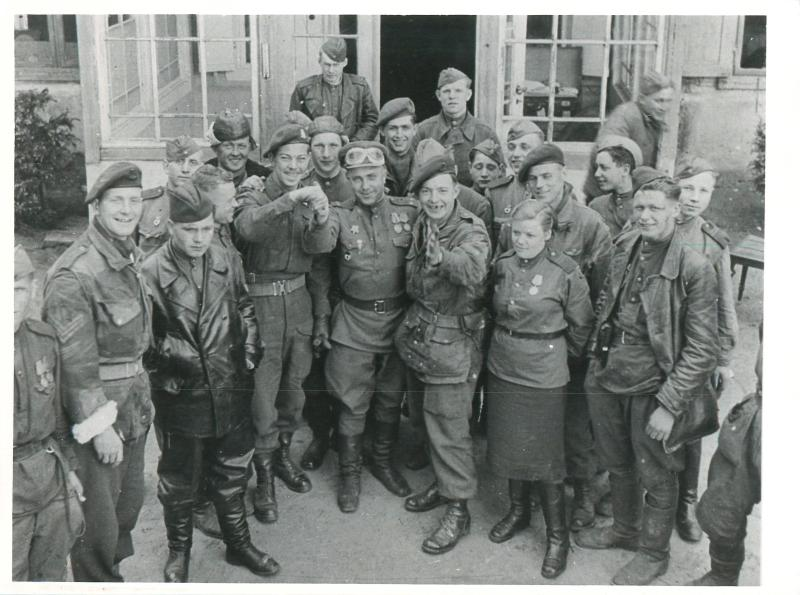
Canadian paratroopers and Soviet soldiers in Wismar, Germany, May 1945

Shortly after the Soviet Union joined the Second World War, diplomatic relations were restored. The German invasion of the Soviet Union forced the Soviets and the Western Allies to work together. In late August and early September 1941, a Canadian-led Expeditionary Force evacuated about 2,000 Soviet miners in the course of the Operation Gauntlet from Spitsbergen and shipped them to Arkhangelsk. The Soviet Union's first ambassador to Canada was Georgy Zarubin. He arrived in Canada in 1944. During the Second World War, aid and arms were relayed through Canada and Alaska to the Soviets, and relations improved considerably.

However, the wartime relationship ended abruptly with the Gouzenko Affair in 1945 and 1946. Igor Gouzenko was a clerk at the Soviet embassy in Ottawa who defected to Canada with evidence of Soviet spying in the West. This was combined with the general East-West tension leading up to the early Cold War, led Canada back to an anti-Soviet stance. By 1947 Canadian foreign policy analysts were advocating the creation of a Western Alliance outside of the United Nations. Soon after in 1949, Canada joined the North Atlantic Treaty Organization (NATO). In 1950 Canada joined with the United Nations forces in the Korean War against the Soviet-allied North. Once the Soviet Union acquired the nuclear bomb, it became obvious that any Soviet attack on the US would go through Canadian airspace. This led to the construction of a series of linked radar stations across Canada, including the Distant Early Warning Line, and Canada's entry in the North American Aerospace Defense agreement (NORAD) with the US.

=== Later relations ===
After the death of Soviet leader Joseph Stalin, Canada hoped tensions would ease, and then Secretary of State for External Affairs Lester Pearson traveled to the Soviet Union for talks with Nikita Khrushchev in 1955, the first NATO foreign minister to do so. However, tension arose again over the Hungarian Revolution and Suez Crisis in 1956. In 1962 the Tory Prime Minister John Diefenbaker caused a crisis of his own by refusing to put Canadian forces on alert during the Cuban Missile Crisis, and by agreeing to acquire nuclear-equipped interceptor aircraft and Bomarc missiles from the US to use against Soviet bombers.

After Pierre Trudeau came to power in Canada, Canadian policy changed dramatically. Trudeau was more sympathetic to socialist nations than other heads of government. Trudeau wanted to lessen Canada's reliance on the United States by forging closer ties with other countries and breaking out of the Cold War straitjacket. During a trip to the Soviet Union in 1971, he identified the United States as a bigger threat to Canada than the remote Soviet Union. The Americans, he said, are "a danger to our national identity from a cultural, economic and perhaps even military point of view." Near the end of his tenure, when he believed that tension between the US and Soviet Union was on the rise, he launched a peace mission to Moscow which the Americans did not approve of. Tensions between the US and the Soviet Union eased soon afterwards.

The government of Progressive Conservative Brian Mulroney cast a much more critical eye on the Soviet Union, despite the changes produced in that country by Mikhail Gorbachev's perestroika and glasnost reforms. As late as January 1989, foreign minister Joe Clark still identified the Soviets as a threat to the West. By May however, he spoke approvingly of Gorbachev's reforms. Canada's changed position was fully shown in November 1989, when Prime Minister Mulroney visited the Soviet Union, accompanied by more than 200 representatives of Canadian business. Numerous agreements were signed during the visit, the most important of which was a Political Declaration calling for Canadian-Soviet cooperation in such areas as the environment, the Arctic, terrorism, and the drug trade. Canadian-Soviet relations were now on friendly terms, until January 1991, when Gorbachev cracked down on independence-seeking Lithuania and Latvia, prompting Canada to suspend credit and technical aid to the Soviet Union. During the 1991 Soviet coup d'état attempt new foreign affairs minister Barbara McDougall, evoked much criticism by indicating that Canada could work with the plotters, a position that was particularly embarrassing when Gorbachev was quickly returned to office.

As the Soviet Union fell apart, Canada moved speedily to establish full relations with Lithuania, Latvia, and Estonia. It acted even before the United States, and in December 1991, Canada was the first Western country to recognize the independence of Ukraine, due to its large population of Ukrainian immigrants. With Gorbachev's resignation that month, the Soviet Union ceased to exist, prompting Canada to recognize Russia as an independent state.

== Cultural relations ==
Both countries competed in the sport of ice hockey such as the 1972 Summit Series and its sequel in 1974. The Soviet Union competed in the Rendez-vous '87 against the NHL All-star team only to win Game 2 5-3. The Punch-up in Piestany was a bench-clearing brawl between the Canadian and Soviet national junior teams during the final game of the 1987 World Junior Ice Hockey Championships in Piešťany, Czechoslovakia (now Slovakia), on January 4, 1987.

== Relations between the Post-Soviet states and Canada ==
- Armenia
- Azerbaijan
- Belarus
- Estonia
- (Georgia (country)) Georgia
- Kazakhstan
- Kyrgyzstan
- Latvia
- Lithuania
- Moldova
- Russia
- Tajikistan
- Turkmenistan
- Ukraine
- Uzbekistan

== See also ==
- Cold War
- Canada in the Cold War
- Canada–Russia relations
