= Leslie James Bennett =

- Born: 1920; South Wales
- Died: 2003 (aged 82–83); Melbourne, Australia
- Occupations: counter-intelligence official in the United Kingdom and Canada
- Known for: accused of being a KGB mole

Leslie James Bennett (1920 – October 18, 2003) was a British/Canadian citizen who spent most of his working life as a counter-intelligence official, first for Britain's GCHQ, and later for the Royal Canadian Mounted Police (RCMP) Security Service. He took an early retirement and moved to Australia.

== Biography ==
Bennett was born in Wales, served with the British signals intelligence organization GCHQ during World War II. According to the Encyclopedia of Cold War Espionage, Spies, and Secret Operations, Bennett met Kim Philby during World War II, when they were both stationed in Turkey.

While living in Australia in 1950 Bennett married an Australian woman. Later that year he and his wife moved to Canada when he began his 22-year employment as a civilian employee of the RCMP.

According to the Encyclopedia of Cold War Espionage, Spies, and Secret Operations in 1962 the Central Intelligence Agency's chief of counter-intelligence James Jesus Angleton trusted Bennett to interview a key Soviet defector Anatol Golitsyn. However, Angleton, who was known for being highly suspicious, began to suspect that Bennett might himself be a mole. Angleton opened a dossier on Bennett in 1967. By 1970 Angleton's suspicions grew to the point the RCMP had to conduct an investigation into Bennett. They put him under surveillance, tapped his phone, and bugged his house—including his bedroom. This operation, codenamed "Operation Gridiron" culminated in taking Bennett to a safehouse for a humiliating five-day interrogation. During his interrogation his interrogators asked Bennett embarrassing personal questions about his sex life based on comments captured from the bug in his bedroom. The investigation did not find any evidence that Bennett was a double agent, but his clearance to have access to top secret information was withdrawn, to satisfy American concerns. According to the Encyclopedia of Cold War Espionage, Spies, and Secret Operations, when Angleton was removed in 1974, it turned out he never had any real evidence Bennett had ever been disloyal.

After he left the RCMP his wife left him, and returned to Australia with their two daughters. The Encyclopedia of Cold War Espionage, Spies, and Secret Operations asserted that he was only able to get menial work.

In 1977 Ian Adams published a short novel entitled S: Portrait of a Spy, about a senior RCMP security official who was a mole. Other commentators would assert that many of the novel's character seemed to be thinly veiled descriptions of real individuals—starting with "S", the titular character, who Paul Hellyer and Peter Worthington would identify as Bennett.

Worthington contacted Bennett, strongly encouraging him to sue Adams. During the civil suit the judge required Adams to name his sources, but allowed Bennett to refuse to testify on the grounds that doing so might reveal secrets that would put national security at risk. Adams and Bennett reached an out of court settlement. Bennett was paid $30,000—reported to be barely enough to pay his legal expenses.

In 1982 John Sawatsky published For Services Rendered: Leslie James Bennett and the RCMP Security Service, which he presented as a more thorough, professional examination of Bennett's career.

In 1985 another Soviet defector, Vitali Sergeyevich Yurchenko confirmed there was a Soviet mole in the RCMP, but identified him as another official. According to the Encyclopedia of Cold War Espionage, Spies, and Secret Operations the actual mole was Sergeant Gilles G. Brunet. In 1993 The Fifth Estate, an investigative journalism television program from the Canadian Broadcasting Corporation, profiled Bennett, and interviewed a former KGB director of foreign counter-intelligence, General Oleg Kalugin, who also confirmed another RCMP official was the mole, and that he had never heard of Bennett. The Fifth Estate also identified the mole as Gilles G. Brunet.

According to Dan Mulvenna, a colleague of Bennett, in 1993, after The Fifth Estate profiled Bennett, the then Solicitor General "exonerated" Bennett, and he was given a $100,000 payment. Bennett had been a civilian employee of the RCMP, he was not officially a Mountie, but, according to Mulvenna, due to his long service and the respect felt for him, the organization of retired Mounties made him an honorary member.
