= Robert Ford (Canadian diplomat) =

Canadian poet, translator and diplomat (1915–1998)

Canadian Ambassador to Colombia
- In office 1957–1958
- Preceded by: Wilfrid Bertram McCullough (Chargé d'Affaires)
- Succeeded by: Jean Morin

Canadian Ambassador to Yugoslavia
- In office 1958–1961
- Preceded by: George Ignatieff
- Succeeded by: Gordon Gale Crean

Canadian Ambassador to Egypt
- In office 1961–1964
- Preceded by: Arnold Cantwell Smith
- Succeeded by: Jean Chapdelaine

Canadian Ambassador to Sudan
- In office 1961–1964
- Succeeded by: Jean Chapdelaine

Canadian Ambassador to the Soviet Union
- In office 1964–1980
- Preceded by: Arnold Cantwell Smith
- Succeeded by: Geoffrey Pearson

Canadian Ambassador to Mongolia
- In office 1974–1980
- Succeeded by: Geoffrey Pearson

Personal details
- Born: Robert Arthur Douglas Ford; January 8, 1915 Ottawa, Ontario, Canada
- Died: April 12, 1998 (aged 83) Vichy, France
- Occupation: Diplomat, translator, poet

Robert Arthur Douglas Ford, CC (January 8, 1915 – April 12, 1998) was a Canadian poet, translator and diplomat.

Born in Ottawa, Ontario, the son of former London Free Press editor-in-chief and University of Western Ontario chancellor Arthur Ford, he received his B.A. in history and English in 1937 from the University of Western Ontario and a M.A. in history in 1940 from Cornell University. He joined the Department of External Affairs in 1940 and was ambassador to Colombia (1957–1959), Yugoslavia (1959–1961), United Arab Republic (1961–1963), to the USSR (1964–1980) and Mongolia (1974–1980). Ford served as a special representative of Canada at the 1st Summit of the Non-Aligned Movement in Belgrade.

In 1971 he was made a Companion of the Order of Canada.

== Bibliography ==
- Window on the North, Toronto: The Ryerson Press (1956), winner of the 1956 Governor General's Award for Poetry or Drama
- The Solitary City, Toronto : McClelland & Stewart (1969)
- Holes in Space, Toronto : Hounslow Press (1979)
- Needle in the Eye, Oakville, Ontario : Mosaic Press (1983)
- Doors, Words, and Silence, Oakville, Ontario : Mosaic Press (1985)
- Russian Poetry: A Personal Anthology, Oakville, Ont.: Mosaic Press (1984)
- Dostoevsky and Other Poems, Oakville, Ont., Mosaic Press (1988)
- Our Man in Moscow, Toronto: U of Toronto P (1989)
- Diplomate et Poète à Moscou trans. SHERR, Robert (text) France: Ed. François-Luc Collignon, 1990.
- Coming from Afar, Toronto : McClelland & Stewart, 1990.
