= David Johnson (Canadian runner) =

Canadian track runner (1902–1973)

Canadian Ambassador to the United Nations
- In office November 1951 – August 1955
- Preceded by: Robert Gerald Riddell
- Succeeded by: Robert Alexander MacKay

Personal details
- Born: 30 April 1902 Lachine, Québec, Canada
- Died: 3 January 1973 (aged 70)

David Moffat Johnson (April 30, 1902 – January 3, 1973) was a Canadian athlete and diplomat.

== Early life ==
David Johnson was born in 1902 in Lachine, Quebec. He studied at McGill and after graduating with an arts degree in 1923, he became the first McGill athlete to earn a Rhodes scholarship to the University of Oxford in England, where he studied at Balliol College, Oxford.

== Track career ==
Johnson was a star athlete at McGill University in Montreal, where he led the varsity track and field team to four consecutive championships in the 1920s.

He was also an Olympian, as Canada's top track runner at the Olympic Games of 1924 in Paris. He finished fourth in two events, including the 400-metre race that was won by Scotland's Eric Liddell. The race was immortalised in the film Chariots of Fire and was recorded in contemporary newsreel: Johnson's maple-leaf emblem standing out clearly on the inside lane. In October, 2007, he was posthumously inducted into the McGill Sports Hall of Fame.

== Diplomatic career ==
David Johnson had a successful diplomatic career, being posted to: Ireland, Pakistan, New York, Vietnam and the USSR. In New York, Johnson was Canada's Ambassador and Permanent Representative to the United Nations (UN). In Vietnam, Johnson was the Canadian Commissioner and Permanent Representative for the International Control Commission (ICC).

Johnson was the Canadian Ambassador to the Soviet Union from 1956 to 1960. He resigned his position after an investigation forced him to admit his homosexuality.

== Death ==
Johnson died in 1973.
