= Robert G. Wright =

Canadian diplomat (active 1971– )

Robert G. Wright is a Canadian former diplomat.

He first worked for the Canadian federal government in 1971, as a policy analyst in the Department of Industry, Trade and Commerce. By 1995, he had risen to the position of Deputy Minister of International Trade, where he served until Prime Minister Jean Chrétien appointed him Canadian Ambassador to Japan in 2001. He served in this position until 2005, when Prime Minister Paul Martin appointed him Ambassador to People's Republic of China, a position he held until 2009, under Prime Mister Stephen Harper. While in China, he was also accredited as Canadian Ambassador to Mongolia.

Born in Montreal, he is the brother of James R. Wright and David Wright, who are both also retired diplomats. They served most recently as Canada's high commissioner to the United Kingdom from 2006 to 2011 and as Canada's permanent representative to the North Atlantic Treaty Organization from 1997 to 2003, respectively.

He sat on the advisory council of the Calgary-based Canadian Defence and Foreign Affairs Institute, starting sometime between November 2012 and January 2013, until sometime between June and September of 2020. He is a senior research fellow for the China Institute.

== See also ==
- List of ambassadors of Canada to China
- List of ambassadors of Canada to Japan
