= Embassy of Canada, Kyiv =

Diplomatic mission of Canada to Ukraine

Embassy of Canada to Ukraine
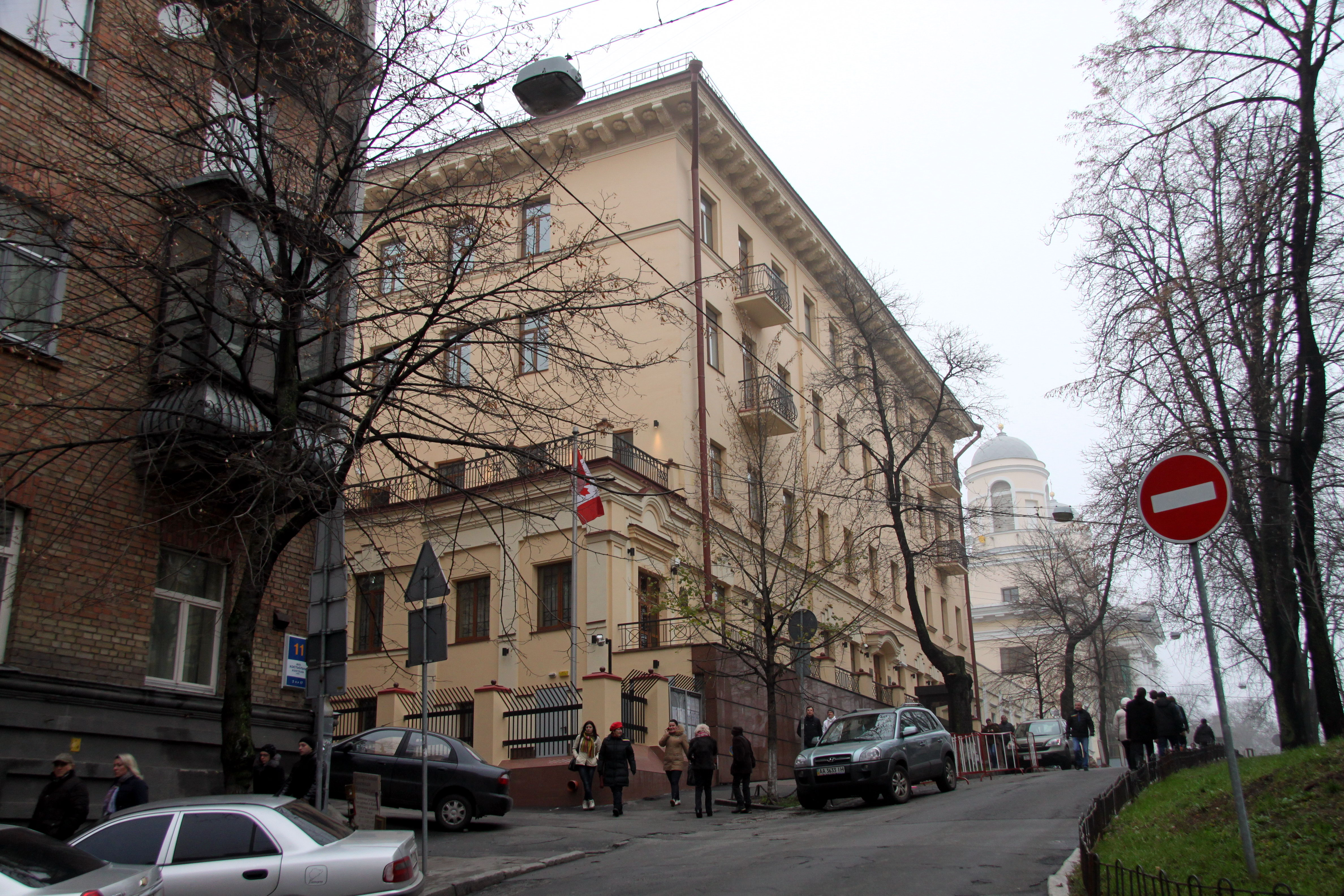
- Location: Kyiv, Ukraine
- Address: 13A Kostelna Street
- Coordinates: 50.4527°N 30.5243°E
- Ambassador: Natalka Cmoc
- Website: Official website

The Embassy of Canada to Ukraine in Kyiv is the diplomatic mission of Canada to Ukraine.

== History ==
Canada was the first western nation to recognize Ukraine's independence on December 2, 1991. The existence of a large Ukrainian-Canadian community has led to continued close relations between the two nations. The Embassy of Canada to Ukraine was established on May 3, 1992. The Consulate of Canada in Lviv provides services to western Ukraine.

The Canadian embassy in Kyiv provides essential services to both Canadians and Ukrainians. Canadian citizens can contact the Canadian embassy if they are in need of medical assistance, notarial services, legal services, passport services or citizenship applications, registration of Canadians residing in Ukraine, information about local regulations, emergency services, financial assistance, money transfers, marriage, divorce and death certificates, assistance for arrested or detained Canadians, information on the whereabouts and well-being of Canadians in Ukraine, and information about child abduction and custody.

Since 20 November 2014 the Australian Embassy to Ukraine has been co-located in the same building under an agreement with the Government of Canada.

On 1 February 2014, an embassy staffer's car was torched after she attended anti-government rallies in the city.

On 18 February 2014, Russian news agency TASS reported that Oleh Tatarov, the deputy head of Ukraine’s Interior Ministry main investigative department, told of attacks on the Canadian embassy in Kyiv by "a group of unidentified persons armed with sticks". It was later revealed that demonstrators had sought refuge at the embassy with a representative of Canada's Minister of Foreign Affairs stating that the protesters had been "peaceful".

The embassy was closed after authorities stormed a camp of activists which triggered clashes that killed at least 26 people. A recorded message on the embassy’s phone lines cited security reasons. It said that embassy staff would continue to provide consular services, and asked Canadians in the country to contact the department if in need of help.

On 12 February 2022, the embassy was temporarily relocated to Lviv, as fears mounted of a possible Russian invasion of Ukraine. Although the embassy was declared reopened on 8 May by Justin Trudeau during a visit to Kyiv, it was reported in July that it was still unstaffed, and that the Canadian ambassador did not return. The embassy remains closed as of March 2025.

== List of ambassadors ==
- François A. Mathys — Ambassador (September 1992 – August 1995)
- Christopher Westdal — Ambassador (January 1996 – August 1998)
- Derek Fraser — Ambassador (September 1998 – August 2001)
- Andrew Robinson — Ambassador (August 2001 – August 2005)
- Abaina M. Dann — Ambassador (September 2005 – August 2008)
- G. Daniel Caron — Ambassador (August 2008 – October 2011)
- Troy Lulashnyk — Ambassador (November 2011 – 2014)
- Roman Waschuk — Ambassador (2014 – 2019)
- Larisa Galadza — Ambassador (2019 – 2023)
- Natalka Cmoc — Ambassador (2023 – 2026)
- Tamara Mawhinney — Ambassador (2026 – present)

== See also ==
- Embassy of Ukraine, Ottawa
- Canada–Ukraine relations
- Diplomatic missions in Ukraine
