= David Wright (Canadian diplomat) =

Canadian diplomat

David S. Wright (born 1944) is a Canadian former diplomat. He served most recently as Canada's permanent representative to the North Atlantic Treaty Organization from 1997 to 2003.

== Education and family ==
He was born in Montreal, Quebec. He graduated from Lower Canada College in 1962. He studied economics and mathematics at McGill University and graduated in 1966. He received an MBA in international finance from Columbia University in 1968.

He is married to Ilze Skuja. They have one son, Julian, who served as a law clerk to Justice Rosalie Abella at the Supreme Court of Canada, as a lawyer at Sullivan and Cromwell's New York office and now as a lawyer at the Global Fund in Geneva. His brothers, James R. Wright and Robert G. Wright, are also a retired diplomats, serving most recently as Canada's high commissioner to the United Kingdom from 2006 to 2011 and ambassador to China from 2005 to 2009, respectively.

== Diplomatic career ==
He joined the Department of External Affairs in 1968 and went on his first overseas posting to Rome in 1969. Throughout the 1970s and 1980s, he alternated between overseas postings and positions in Ottawa. He served as director of the department's Policy Planning Bureau from 1982 to 1985, during which he helped draft the department's May 1985 green paper, Competitiveness and Security: Directions for Canada's International Relations.

He served as Assistant Deputy Minister for Europe in the recently renamed Department of Foreign Affairs and International Trade from 1990 to 1994, helping shape Canada's response to the downfall of the Soviet Union, the Gulf War and the outbreak of the Yugoslav Wars.

He became Canada's ambassador to Spain in 1994, serving during the Canadian-Spanish fishing dispute known as the Turbot War in 1995. He was named Canada's ambassador and permanent representative to the North Atlantic Treaty Organization in 1997, serving during the Kosovo War and the aftermath of the September 11th attacks, including the War in Afghanistan and the Iraq War. He was Dean of the North Atlantic Council from 2000 to 2003. He retired in 2003 after 35 years in the Canadian foreign service.

== Post-diplomatic career ==
He is currently the Kenneth and Patricia Taylor Distinguished Visiting Professor in Foreign Affairs, Victoria College, University of Toronto. He currently teaches a course on world affairs in Vic One, a seminar program for first year students; and a fourth year seminar course on contemporary issues in foreign policy.

He is also a special advisor to Dale & Lessmann LLP, a Canadian law firm, where he keeps clients abreast of developments in trade negotiations, particularly on the proposed Canada-European Union Comprehensive Economic and Trade Agreement.

Diplomatic posts
Preceded by	Monaco (Note: Up to the appointment of David Wright in 1989, the Consuls General in Marseille also served as Canada's official representatives to the Principality of Monaco. On his appointment to the embassy in Paris as Minister, David Wright and his successors were also appointed Canada's Consul General to Monaco.); 1989–1990	Succeeded by
Preceded by Jean-Pierre Juneau	Ambassador Extraordinary and Plenipotentiary to Spain; 1994–1997	Succeeded by Anthony Vincent
Preceded by None	Ambassador Extraordinary and Plenipotentiary to Andorra; 1996–1997	Succeeded by Anthony Vincent
Preceded by Admiral John R. Anderson	Ambassador and Permanent Representative to the North Atlantic Council; 1997–2003	Succeeded by Jean-Pierre Juneau
