= Larisa Galadza =

Canadian diplomat

Her Excellency Larisa Galadza
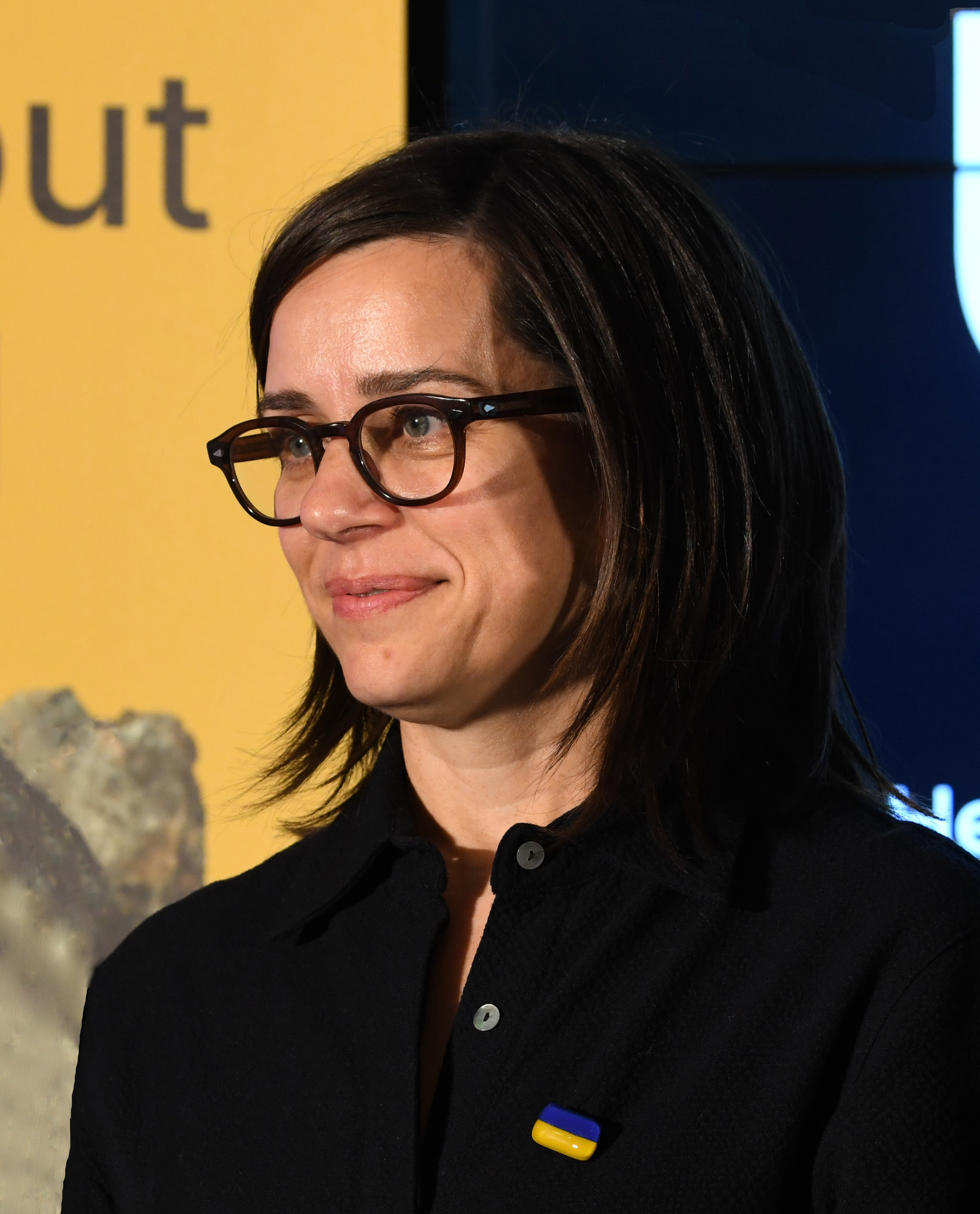

Canadian Ambassador to Ukraine
- In office November 4, 2019 – August 14, 2023
- Preceded by: Roman Waschuk
- Succeeded by: Natalka Cmoc

Personal details
- Born: May 19, 1971 (age 55)
- Education: Trinity College, Toronto (BA); Carleton University (MA)
- Occupation: Diplomat

Larisa Galadza (Ukrainian: Лариса Ґаладза; born May 19, 1971) is a Canadian diplomat who has served as Ambassador of Canada to Ukraine from 2019 to 2023.

== Early life and education ==
Galadza's grandparents, all born in Ukraine, immigrated to the United States in 1949. She was born in Welland, Ontario, to Roman Galadza, then pastor of St. Michael Ukrainian Church, and Irene (née Bishko), who had both immigrated to Canada in 1969 from Kerhonkson, New York. In 1975, when Galadza was three years old, her family moved to Brampton, Ontario.

Galadza received her BA Hons in Political Science and Ethics at Trinity College at the University of Toronto in 1994, and an MA in International Affairs at Carleton University in 1996.

== Career ==
In 1996, she joined the Department of National Defence. After working in policy-related positions at the Privy Council Office in 2001 and at the Treasury Board Secretariat from 2003 to 2006, she moved to Public Safety Canada, where she was Director of Strategic Policy and Research and then senior director for National Security Policy. From 2012 to 2014, she served at the Privy Council Office as director of operations for the Social Affairs Committee of Cabinet, and then, from 2014 to 2016, she was Director General of Admissibility at Citizenship and Immigration Canada. In 2016, she became director general of the Peace and Stabilization Operations Program at Global Affairs Canada.

On November 4, 2019, she became the Ambassador of Canada to Ukraine. She served in this role during the 2022 Russian invasion of Ukraine. Her ambassadorship ended August 14, 2023.

She served as Head of the Canada - US Engagement task force in February to August 2024 and then appointed Director General of the Cyber, Critical Technology and Democratic Resilience Bureau in the International Security and Political Affairs Branch of Global Affairs Canada.

She was appointed Associate Assistant Deputy Minister, International Security and Political Affairs in June 2025.

In February 2026 she took the role of Charge d'Affaires in Ankara, Turkey.

== See also ==
- Embassy of Canada in Kyiv
- Canada–Ukraine relations
