= Paul André Beaulieu =

Canadian diplomat (1904–2007)

Paul André Beaulieu (1904–2007) was a Canadian diplomat. He was appointed Chargé d'Affaires a.i. to Lebanon then succeeded as Ambassador Extraordinary and Plenipotentiary to Lebanon. He was later appointed as Ambassador Extraordinary and Plenipotentiary to Iraq then to Brazil. He was next appointed as Ambassador and Permanent Representative to the United Nations in New York City then as Ambassador Extraordinary and Plenipotentiary to France and then to Portugal.

Diplomatic posts
Preceded by Ronald Macalister Macdonnell	Chargé d'Affaires a.i. to Lebanon; 1958	Succeeded by Paul André Beaulieu (Ambassador Extraordinary and Plenipotentiary)
Preceded by Paul André Beaulieu (Ambassador Extraordinary and Plenipotentiary)	Ambassador Extraordinary and Plenipotentiary to Lebanon; 1958–1963	Succeeded by John Ryerson Maybee
Preceded by Established	Ambassador Extraordinary and Plenipotentiary to Iraq; 1961–1963	Succeeded by Thomas Paul Malone
Preceded by Joseph Marc Antoine Jean Chapdelaine	Ambassador Extraordinary and Plenipotentiary to Brazil; 1963–1967	Succeeded by Joseph Charles Léonard Yvon Beaulne
Preceded by George Ignatieff	Ambassador and Permanent Representative to the United Nations (New York); 1967–1968	Succeeded by Joseph Charles Léonard Yvon Beaulne
Preceded by Jules Léger	Ambassador Extraordinary and Plenipotentiary to France; 1968–1970	Succeeded by Hon. Joseph Alphonse Léo Cadieux
Preceded by Michel Gauvin	Ambassador Extraordinary and Plenipotentiary to Portugal; 1970–1972	Succeeded by Roger Duhamel
