= List of ambassadors of Canada to Myanmar =

Coordinates: 16.772989°N 96.158571°E

Ambassador of Canada to Myanmar
- Incumbent; Mark McDowell since August 14, 2013
- Inaugural holder: Arthur Redpath Menzies
- Formation: September 3, 1958

The Canadian Ambassador to Myanmar in Yangon is the official representative of the Government of Canada in Ottawa to the Government of Myanmar.

== History ==
Until August 14, 2013, the Canadian Ambassador to Thailand in Bangkok was accredited concurrently to the government in Naypyidaw.

== List of representatives ==
Diplomatic agreement/designated	Diplomatic accreditation	Ambassador	Observations	Prime Minister of Canada	List of presidents of Myanmar	Term end
July 1958	September 3, 1958	Arthur Redpath Menzies		John Diefenbaker	Win Maung	July 16, 1961
July 16, 1961		Pierre-André Bissonnette	Chargé d'Affaires concurrently as Canadian Ambassador to Malaysia	John Diefenbaker	Win Maung	January 1962
November 22, 1961		Charles Eustace McGaughey		John Diefenbaker	Win Maung	
March 25, 1965	November 6, 1965	Bertram Charles Butler		Lester Pearson	Ne Win	August 11, 1967
August 3, 1967	November 22, 1967	John Gaylard Hadwen		Lester Pearson	Ne Win	July 31, 1971
August 4, 1971		Edward Rose Rettie		Pierre Trudeau	Ne Win	
June 13, 1974		David Stansfield		Pierre Trudeau	Ne Win	
February 2, 1976	August 9, 1976	William Edward Bauer		Pierre Trudeau	Ne Win	June 4, 1979
April 4, 1979		M. Fred Bild		Joe Clark	Ne Win	
July 26, 1979	October 27, 1979	Arthur Robert Wright		Joe Clark	Ne Win	July 16, 1982
September 22, 1982		Christopher William Westdal		Pierre Trudeau	San Yu	
November 21, 1985	October 21, 1985	Anthony Vincent		Brian Mulroney	San Yu	September 2, 1988
December 7, 1988	May 29, 1989	Émile Gauvreau		Brian Mulroney	Saw Maung	August 5, 1992
1992		Arthur C. Perron		Brian Mulroney	Saw Maung	July 12, 1994
1994		Manfred Gustav von Nostitz		Jean Chrétien	Than Shwe	June 23, 1997
October 30, 1997		Bernard Giroux		Jean Chrétien	Than Shwe	
August 20, 2001	October 4, 2002	Andrew McAlister		Jean Chrétien	Than Shwe	
August 9, 2004	May 13, 2005	Denis Comeau		Paul Martin	Than Shwe	July 10, 2007
March 21, 2011		Ron Hoffmann		Stephen Harper	Thein Sein	
March 26, 2013	August 14, 2013	Mark McDowell		Stephen Harper	Thein Sein; Htin Kyaw	
August 10, 2016		MacArthur, Karen			Htin Kyaw; Win Myint	
