= Anthony Vincent (diplomat) =

Former Canadian ambassador to Peru (1939–1999)

Anthony Vincent (November 9, 1939 – October 29, 1999) was the Canadian ambassador to Peru from 1993 to 1997. He was a key player in the Japanese embassy hostage crisis of 1996, for which he was awarded the Meritorious Service Medal. He previously served as ambassador to Myanmar and high commissioner to Bangladesh from 1985 to 1988, and later served as ambassador to Spain from 1997 to 1999. Vincent died on October 29, 1999 in Montreal at the age of 59.

Vincent is the subject of the 2008 book The Ambassador's Word: Hostage Crisis in Peru 1996-97 by David J. Goldfield.

Diplomatic posts
Preceded by Chris Westdal	High Commissioner of Canada to Bangladesh; Ambassador of Canada to Burma; 1985-1988	Succeeded by Émile Gauvreau
Preceded by James Darrell Leach	Ambassador of Canada to Peru and Bolivia; 1993–1997	Succeeded by Graeme C. Clark
Preceded by David Wright	Ambassador of Canada to Spain and Andorra; 1997–1999	Succeeded by Alain Dudoit
