= Roman Waschuk =

Ukrainian diplomat

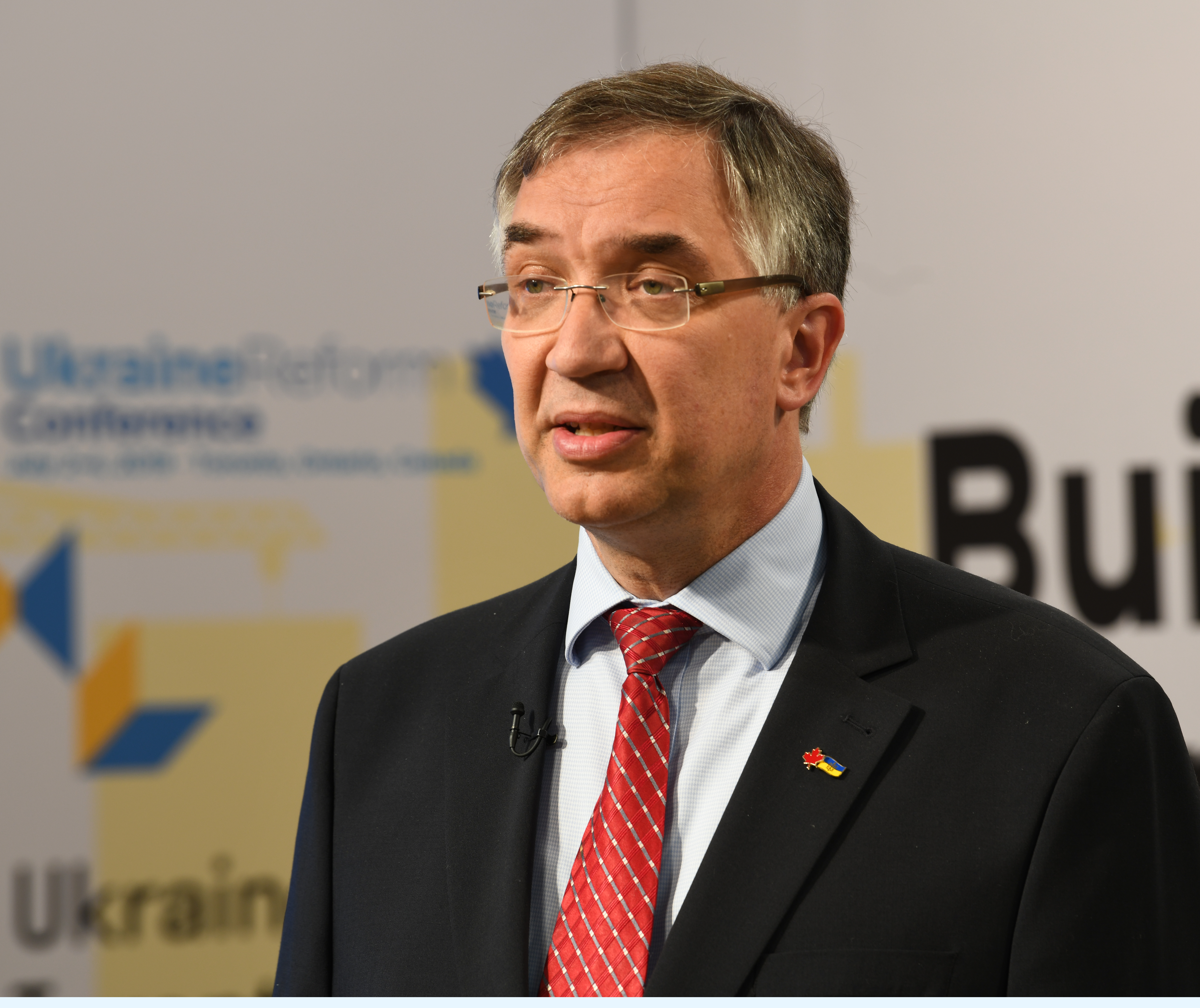
- Washcuk in 2019

Canadian Ambassador to Ukraine
- In office October 2014 – October 2019
- Preceded by: Troy Lulashnyk
- Succeeded by: Larisa Galadza

Personal details
- Born: 28 January 1962 (age 64)
- Education: University of Toronto (MA)
- Occupation: Diplomat

Roman Waschuk (also Roman Vashchuk; Ukrainian: Роман Ващук; born 28 January 1962) is a Canadian diplomat, who has served as Ukraine's Business Ombudsman since 1 January 2022. A retired diplomat of Ukrainian descent, he served as Ambassador of Canada to Ukraine from 2014 to 2019.

== Early life ==
Waschuk's parents immigrated to Canada from Western Ukraine after the Second World War. His father was born in present-day Ivano-Frankivsk Oblast, his mother born in Buchach. He studied history with focus on Central and Eastern Europe, also German and Russian, receiving 1985 a MA at University of Toronto. He worked for the Commission of Inquiry on War Criminals from July 1985 to December 1986, providing background information to investigators and counsel on WW2-era events in Central, Eastern and Southern Europe. He is fluent in English, French, German, Russian, Ukrainian, Polish, and Serbian. He was member of the Ukrainian Scouting organization "Plast" in Canada.

== Career ==
In 1987, he began his career in the diplomatic service of the Ministry of Foreign Affairs of Canada. First posted as second secretary for politics in the Canadian Embassy in Moscow, USSR. Then he subsequently served as political counsellor in Kyiv and minister-counsellor for (politics and economy in Berlin. 1991-1994 he worked on East European affairs in the Department of Foreign Affairs, Trade and Development of Canada. From 1994 to 1998, he was Advisor at the Canadian Embassy in Kyiv.

In Ottawa, Waschuk held the positions of a deputy director of the European Union Division, deputy director of the Policy Planning Division, director of the Global Partnership for Biological Non-Proliferation, Chemical Weapons Destruction and Redirection of Former Weapons Scientists Division, and director of the Stabilization and Reconstruction Programs Division.

From 2011 to September 2014, Waschuk served as ambassador to Serbia, with concurrent accreditation to the Republic of Macedonia and Montenegro.

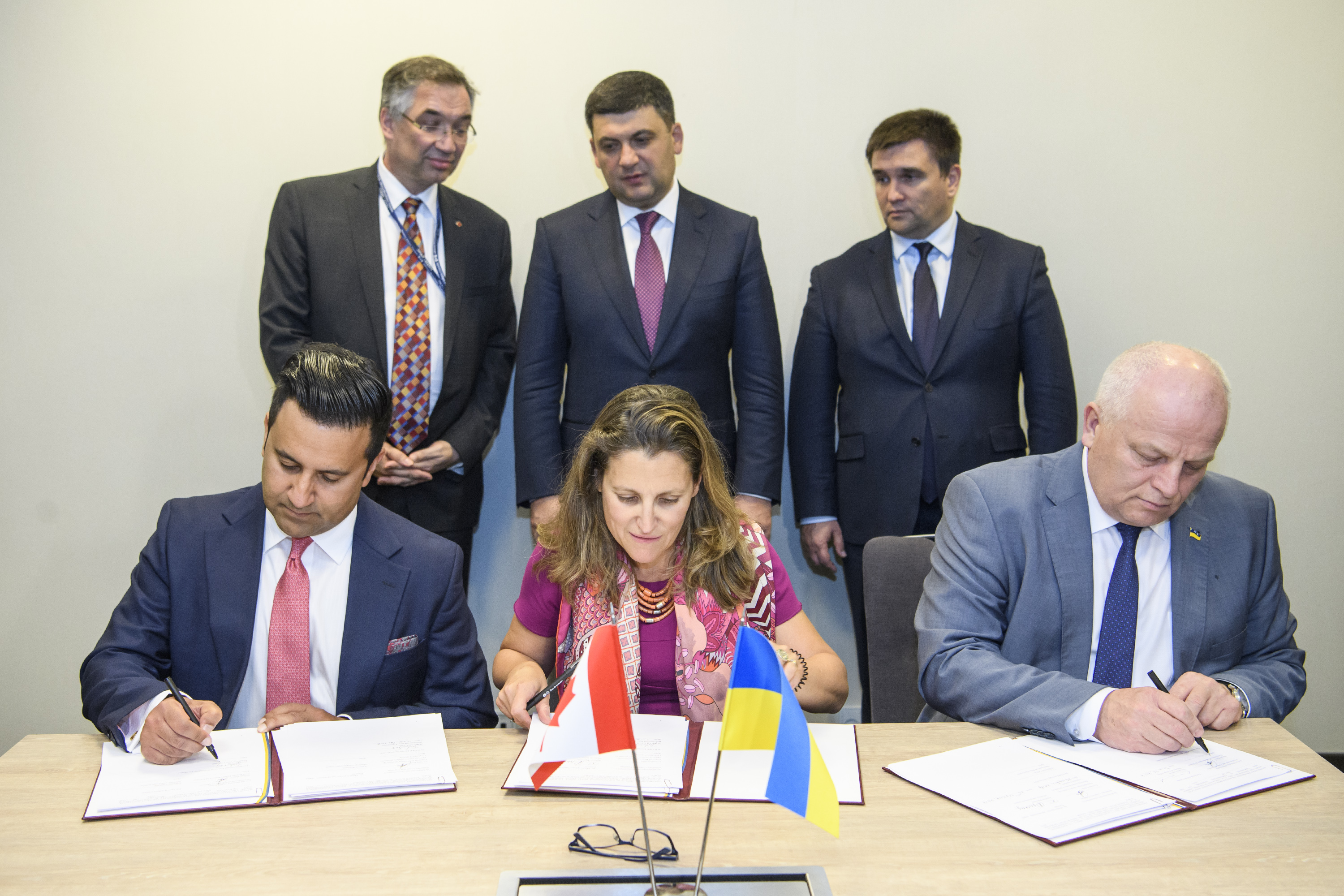
Waschuk in Copenhagen with Chrystia Freeland and Volodymyr Groysman in 2018

From October 2014 to October 2019, he was the Ambassador of Canada in Kyiv. He replaced Troy Lulashnyk, who was Ambassador to Ukraine from November 2011 to October 2014.

He has published papers on Central European history, human security, and Canada-EU defence relations. About his time in Berlin he held a lecture at Munk School, University Toronto, titled "A Canadian in Berlin – Reflections On A Foreign Service Career And A Bilateral Relationship".

In an interview with The Canadian Press, Washuk refused critics who complained that the Canadian embassy in Kyiv gave shelter to protesters during Ukraine uprising of February 2014, when his predecessor Lulashnyk was ambassador. He acknowledged the protesters were camped in the main lobby for at least a week. Waschuk also suggested no harm came of it. "From what I was told, it was several days and they left flowers on departure," he said. The opening of the doors was "a gesture designed to react and to reach out to the people suffering in the turmoil," Waschuk said.

He has served as Business Ombudsman in Ukraine since January 1, 2022.

== See also ==
- Canada's Ambassadors in Kyiv
- Canada–Ukraine relations
- Euromaidan
