= List of high commissioners of Canada to Bangladesh =

High Commissioner for Canada in Bangladesh
- Incumbent; Ajit Singh since September 16, 2024
- Seat: High Commission of Canada, Dhaka
- Nominator: Prime Minister of Canada
- Appointer: Governor General of Canada
- Term length: At His Majesty's pleasure
- Inaugural holder: Gordon Edwin Cox
- Formation: April 6, 1972

The High Commissioner of Canada to Bangladesh is the official representative of the Canadian government to the government of Bangladesh. The official title is High Commissioner for Canada in Bangladesh. The current Canadian High Commissioner is Ajit Singh who was appointed on the advice of Prime Minister Justin Trudeau on September 16, 2024.

The High Commission of Canada is located at United Nations Road, Baridhara, Dhaka, Bangladesh.

As fellow members of the Commonwealth of Nations, diplomatic relations between Canada and Bangladesh are at governmental level, rather than between heads of state. Thus, the countries exchange High Commissioners, rather than ambassadors.

== History of diplomatic relations ==
Diplomatic relations between Canada and Bangladesh was established on February 14, 1972. Gordon Edwin Cox was appointed as Canada's first High Commissioner in Bangladesh on April 6, 1972.

== List of heads of mission ==
| No. | Name | Term of office | | | Career | Prime Minister nominated by | Ref. |
| No. | Name | Start date | PoC. | End date | Career | Prime Minister nominated by | Ref. |
|---|---|---|---|---|---|---|---|
| 1 | Gordon Edwin Cox | April 6, 1972 | June 5, 1972 | August 26, 1972 | Career | Pierre Elliott Trudeau (1968–1979) (1980–1984) | |
| 2 | Gordon George Riddell | June 8, 1972 | October 30, 1972 | June 16, 1974 | Career | Pierre Elliott Trudeau (1968–1979) (1980–1984) | |
| 3 | Robert Wallace McLaren | July 24, 1973 | July 25, 1973 | August 1, 1975 | Career | Pierre Elliott Trudeau (1968–1979) (1980–1984) | |
| 4 | Jack F. Godsell | February 17, 1976 | February 28, 1976 | June 27, 1979 | Career | Pierre Elliott Trudeau (1968–1979) (1980–1984) | |
| 5 | Arthur Robert Wright | April 4, 1979 | July 22, 1979 | July 16, 1982 | Career | Pierre Elliott Trudeau (1968–1979) (1980–1984) | |
| 6 | Chris Westdal | September 22, 1982 | September 23, 1982 | | Career | Pierre Elliott Trudeau (1968–1979) (1980–1984) | |
| 7 | Anthony Vincent | July 4, 1985 | October 8, 1985 | September 2, 1988 | Career | Brian Mulroney (1984–1993) | |
| 8 | Émile Gauvreau | August 17, 1988 | October 29, 1988 | August 5, 1993 | Career | Brian Mulroney (1984–1993) | |
| 9 | Jon J. Scott | July 23, 1993 | September 12, 1993 | September 1996 | Career | Kim Campbell (1993) | |
| 10 | Nicholas Etheridge | September 11, 1996 | October 5, 1996 | August 4, 1999 | Career | Jean Chrétien (1993–2003) | |
| 11 | David Preston | August 11, 1999 | October 5, 1999 | July 12, 2002 | Career | Jean Chrétien (1993–2003) | |
| 12 | Gerald K. Campbell | August 1, 2002 | September 5, 2002 | | Career | Jean Chrétien (1993–2003) | |
| 13 | David Sproule | August 9, 2004 | September 5, 2004 | August 28, 2005 | Career | Paul Martin (2003–2006) | |
| 14 | Barbara Richardson | November 24, 2005 | December 22, 2005 | | Career | Paul Martin (2003–2006) | |
| 15 | Robert McDougall | September 2, 2008 | October 20, 2008 | September 21, 2011 | Career | Stephen Harper (2006–2015) | |
| 16 | Heather Cruden | September 21, 2011 | November 24, 2011 | December 16, 2014 | Career | Stephen Harper (2006–2015) | |
| 17 | Benoît-Pierre Laramée | November 20, 2014 | February 2, 2015 | August 17, 2017 | Career | Stephen Harper (2006–2015) | |
| 18 | Benoit Préfontaine | August 17, 2017 | October 5, 2017 | December 20, 2021 | Career | Justin Trudeau (2015–2025) | |
| 19 | Lilly Nicholls | December 20, 2021 | February 3, 2022 | September 13, 2024 | Career | Justin Trudeau (2015–2025) | |
| 20 | Ajit Singh | September 16, 2024 | November 20, 2024 | | Career | Justin Trudeau (2015–2025) | |
