= Canada–Ukraine authorization for emergency travel =

Former emergency visa offered by the Canadian government

The Canada–Ukraine authorization for emergency travel (CUAET; French: Autorisation de voyage d’urgence Canada–Ukraine, AVUCU) is a temporary travel visa introduced by the Canadian government in March 2022 following the Russian invasion of Ukraine. The program provides temporary status to Ukrainian nationals and their family members, allowing visa holders to travel, study, and work within Canada for up to three years. Canada also temporarily offered additional support to those arriving under CUAET. Applications were closed on 15 July 2023.

== Visa implementation ==
During the first session of the 44th Canadian Parliament, in direct response to the Russian invasion of Ukraine, the Standing Committee on Citizenship and Immigration submitted a report that recommended implementing visa-free travel from Ukraine to Canada by use of electronic travel authorization (eTA). Members of parliament agreed with the report and its suggestion. The CUAET visa was then introduced on 17 March 2022. It was provided free of charge with no limit on the number of applicants accepted. An online application process was made available for those overseas, allowing them to submit required biometric data (fingerprints and a photo) online. The online application took 14 days to process. A total of 1,189,320 applications were received, of which 962,612, or approximately 80.94%, were approved. As of 1 April 2024, 298,128 people arrived in Canada under CUAET. Applications were closed on 15 July 2023. 31 March 2024 was the last day to enter Canada under CUAET measures. Those entering after this date with a CUAET visa are not eligible for federal supports offered under CUAET and will need to meet general requirements to enter Canada. 31 March 2024 was also the last day to extend or change the temporary status in Canada under CUAET. Applicants who have experienced delays with their applications and received a positive decision on or after 4 February 2024 are eligible to arrive in Canada by 31 July 2024. Upon arrival, they can apply for an inland study permit and an open work permit at no cost.

== Visa holder status and benefits ==
Those approved would be permitted to stay in Canada for up to three years, as opposed to the six months of typical visitor visas, and are legally considered temporary residents rather than refugees. Unlike refugees, temporary residents are not provided permanent residency upon arrival or social support in some provinces, and will have to pay international student fees to attend post-secondary education. Provincial governments that provide social support include British Columbia and Ontario, providing Medical Services Plan (MSP) and Ontario Health Insurance Plan (OHIP), respectively, upon arrival. Manitoba covers the cost of medical examinations for arrivals under CUAET.

Aidan Strickland, press secretary for the Minister of Immigration, Refugees, and Citizenship Canada, clarified that CUAET visa holders were granted temporary residency, not refugee status, based on the Ukrainian community's preference for a temporary solution. Notably, refugees returning to their home country after settling in Canada would have their statuses revoked, and the refugee application process is typically lengthier.

== Additional support initiatives ==
On 11 May 2022, Canada announced it would provide three charter flights from Warsaw to Canada free of charge for people with CUAET. Arrivals would also be offered free accommodations for up to 14 nights. On 23 May 2022, Canada announced the Canada-Ukraine Transitional Assistance Initiative (CUTAI) to further support Ukrainians arriving in Canada under CUAET. All individuals in Canada under CUAET are eligible to receive one-time financial support under CUTAI, amounting to CA$3,000 per adult (18 years and older) and CA$1,500 per child (17 years and younger).

== See also ==
- Canada–Ukraine relations
- Ukrainian Canadians
- Ukrainian refugee crisis (2022–present)
