= Yvon Beaulne =

Canadian diplomat

Joseph Charles Léonard Yvon Beaulne (1919–1999) was a Canadian diplomat. He was Ambassador Extraordinary and Plenipotentiary to Venezuela, the Dominican Republic and Brazil. He then became the Ambassador and Permanent Representative to the United Nations in New York and shortly thereafter to UNESCO and then to the papal Holy See.

He was awarded The Order of Canada in 1992 for his contribution "to the promotion of human rights and freedoms, particularly through the creation of the Human Rights Research and Education Centre at the University of Ottawa and his considerable work with the United Nations Human Rights Commission."

Diplomatic posts
Preceded by Andrew Donald Ross	Ambassador Extraordinary and Plenipotentiary to Venezuela; 1961–1964	Succeeded by Bruce Irving Rankin
Preceded by Kenneth Frederick Noble	Ambassador Extraordinary and Plenipotentiary to the Dominican Republic; 1963–1964	Succeeded by Bruce Irving Rankin
Preceded by Paul André Beaulieu	Ambassador Extraordinary and Plenipotentiary to Brazil; 1967–1969	Succeeded by Clive Edward Glover
Preceded by George Ignatieff	Ambassador and Permanent Representative to the United Nations (New York); 1969–1972	Succeeded by Saul Forbes Rae
Preceded by Jean-Louis Gagnon	Ambassador and Permanent Delegate to the United Nations Educational, Scientific and Cultural Organization (UNESCO); 1976–1979	Succeeded by Pierre L. Trottier
Preceded by Jacques Bélec	Ambassador Extraordinary and Plenipotentiary to the Holy See; 1978–1984	Succeeded by Pierre Dumas
