= Jules Léger =

Governor General of Canada from 1974 to 1979

The Right Honourable Jules Léger PC CC CMM CD
- Léger in 1974

21st Governor General of Canada
- In office January 14, 1974 – January 22, 1979
- Monarch: Elizabeth II
- Prime Minister: Pierre Trudeau
- Preceded by: Roland Michener
- Succeeded by: Edward Schreyer

More...

Personal details
- Born: April 4, 1913 Saint-Anicet, Quebec, Canada
- Died: November 22, 1980 (aged 67) Ottawa, Ontario, Canada
- Spouse: Gabrielle Léger
- Profession: Diplomat

Joseph Jules Léger (French: [ʒyl leʒe]; April 4, 1913 – November 22, 1980) was a Canadian diplomat and statesman who served as the 21st governor general of Canada from 1974 to 1979.

Léger was born in Quebec and educated in Quebec and France prior to starting a career in the Canadian Department of External Affairs, and eventually served as ambassador to a number of countries. He was in 1973 appointed as governor general by Queen Elizabeth II, on the recommendation of Prime Minister of Canada Pierre Trudeau, to replace Roland Michener as viceroy, and he occupied the post until succeeded by Edward Schreyer in 1979. As the Queen's representative, Léger was credited for modernising the office and fostering Canadian unity.

On June 1, 1979, Léger was sworn into the Queen's Privy Council for Canada, giving him the accordant style of The Honourable. However, as a former Governor General of Canada, Léger was entitled to be styled for life with the superior form of The Right Honourable. He died on November 22, 1980.

== Early life and career ==
Born in Saint-Anicet, Quebec, to Ernest and Alda (née Beauvais), Léger, along with his brother (and future cardinal), Paul-Émile, was raised in a devoutly religious family. After completing high school, Léger went on to the Collège de Valleyfield and then the Université de Montréal, where he completed a law degree. Léger subsequently enrolled at the Sorbonne in Paris, from which he was awarded a doctorate in 1938, the same year that, on August 13, he married Gabrielle Carmel, whom he had met at the University of Paris. The couple together had two daughters, Francine and Helene.

When Léger returned to Canada at the end of 1938, he was hired as an associate editor of Le Droit in Ottawa, but remained there for only one year before he went on to become a professor of diplomatic history at the University of Ottawa until 1942. Simultaneously, Léger joined in 1940 the Department of External Affairs, and in just over 13 years received his first overseas diplomatic posting as Canada's ambassador to Mexico. After his retirement from that office on August 1, 1954, he returned to Ottawa to act as under-secretary of state for external affairs, until, on September 25, 1958, he was commissioned as ambassador and permanent representative to the North Atlantic Council, occupying that post until 5 July 1962, as well as the Canadian representative to the Organisation for European Economic Cooperation in Paris. Then, from 1962 to 1964, Léger held the commission of ambassador to Italy, and, from 1964 to 1968 was the ambassador to France. It was during this time, in July 1967, that French president Charles de Gaulle visited Canada to attend Expo 67, and in Montreal gave his Vive le Québec libre speech. This event caused a diplomatic chill for many years between Canada and France; however, Léger attracted admiration for his subsequent sensitive handling of de Gaulle's policy towards Quebec.

By 1968, Léger had returned to Canada's capital and was appointed as under-secretary of state, providing the administrative basis for Prime Minister Lester B. Pearson's foreign policy, and the policies on bilingualism and multiculturalism developed by the Cabinet chaired by Pearson's successor, Pierre Trudeau. Léger left that position in 1972, and briefly served as ambassador to Belgium and Luxembourg between March 1973 and January 1974. His daughter Francine died by suicide at the Canadian Embassy in 1968.

== Governor General of Canada ==
It was on October 5, 1973, that Queen Elizabeth II had, by commission under the royal sign-manual and Great Seal of Canada, appointed Pierre Trudeau's choice of Léger to succeed Roland Michener as the Queen's representative. He was subsequently sworn-in during a ceremony in the Senate chamber on January 14, of the following year.

Only six months later, just prior to a ceremony wherein he was to receive an honorary degree from the Université de Sherbrooke, Léger suffered a stroke, leaving him with impeded speech and a paralysed right arm. Though he returned to his viceregal duties not long after, presiding over an Order of Canada investiture in December 1974, his wife assisted him on many occasions, even reading parts of the Speech from the Throne in 1976 and 1978. Still, the Légers travelled across the country, encouraging Canadian unity at a time fraught with Quebec sovereignty disputes and perceived alienation by other regions, as well promoting the fine arts and artistic endeavours, aided at such by their friendships with painters such as Jean Paul Lemieux, Alfred Pellan, and Jean Dallaire. In 1978 Léger established the Jules Léger Prize for New Chamber Music. He also established an award for heritage conservation and the Jules Léger Scholarship to promote academic excellence in bilingual programs at the University of Regina. Léger was credited with greatly modernising the Office of the Governor General, having, among other things, eschewed the traditional court dress of the Windsor uniform in favour of morning dress at state functions, though he was also negatively criticised for the same, as well as for asking that decorations, particularly those from the Second World War, not be worn at certain state events. He was further critiqued for remaining in such an important office despite his incapacitation. Still, he remained focused on the person and institution he represented, and was known to write to the Queen on a monthly basis. His official portrait was a first for including the viceregal consort, done to recognise Gabrielle's contributions to her husband's service.

== Post viceregal life ==
After leaving Rideau Hall, the Légers continued to live in Ottawa. Léger died on November 22, 1980, and was survived by his wife and daughter.

== Honours ==
=== Ribbon bars of Jules Léger ===

Appointments

- June 19, 1973 – January 14, 1974: Companion of the Order of Canada (CC)
  - January 14, 1974 – January 22, 1979: Chancellor and Principal Companion of the Order of Canada (CC)
  - January 22, 1979 – November 22, 1980: Companion of the Order of Canada (CC)
- (Canada) January 14, 1974 – January 22, 1979: Chancellor and Commander of the Order of Military Merit (CMM)
  - January 22, 1979 – November 22, 1980: Commander of the Order of Military Merit (CMM)
- January 14, 1974 – January 22, 1979: Knight of Justice, Prior, and Chief Officer in Canada of the Most Venerable Order of the Hospital of Saint John of Jerusalem (KStJ)
  - January 22, 1979 – November 22, 1980: Knight of Justice of the Most Venerable Order of the Hospital of Saint John of Jerusalem (KStJ)
- January 14, 1974 – January 22, 1979: Chief Scout of Canada
- 1974 – November 22, 1980: Honorary Member of the Royal Military College of Canada Club
- June 1, 1979 – November 22, 1980: Member of the Queen's Privy Council for Canada (PC)

Medals

- (Canada) January 14, 1974: Canadian Forces' Decoration (CD)
- (Canada) 1977: Queen Elizabeth II Silver Jubilee Medal

=== Honorary military appointments ===
- (Canada) January 14, 1974 – January 22, 1979: Colonel of the Governor General's Horse Guards
- (Canada) January 14, 1974 – January 22, 1979: Colonel of the Governor General's Foot Guards
- (Canada) January 14, 1974 – January 22, 1979: Colonel of the Canadian Grenadier Guards

=== Honorary degrees ===
- 31 March 1974: University of British Columbia, Doctor of Laws (LLD)
- (Quebec) 8 June 1974: Université de Sherbrooke, Doctor of the University (DUniv)
- (Ontario) 7 February 1976: Royal Military College of Canada, Doctor of Laws (LLD)
- (Ontario) : University of Ottawa, Doctor of Laws (LLD)

=== Honorific eponyms ===
Awards

- Canada: Jules and Gabrielle Léger Fellowship
- Saskatchewan: Jules Léger Scholarship, University of Regina, Regina

=== Arms ===
Coat of arms of Jules Léger
Notes As Léger served as governor general prior to the establishment of the Canadian Heraldic Authority, he was not granted a coat of arms until 1988, when his surviving relatives petitioned the Chief Herald of Canada some eight years after Léger's death. The design is based on the seal created for Léger by Alex Colville in 1975; unlike the arms for subsequent governors general, Léger's is devoid of embellishment, including neither the ribbon and insignia of the Order of Canada, nor supporters, crest, compartment, or motto. Adopted June 4, 1988 Escutcheon Blue Céleste in chief an owl affronty hovering Argent in base a maple leaf ensigned by the Royal Crown both Or. Symbolism The maple leaf is symbolic of Canada, and the Crown of the Canadian sovereign that Léger represented as viceroy. The snowy owl evokes wisdom, and is also the official bird of Quebec, where Léger was born and raised.

== See also ==
- Diplomatic corps

Government offices
Preceded by Roland Michener	Governor General of Canada; 1974–1979	Succeeded by Edward Schreyer
Diplomatic posts
Preceded by James Coningsby Langley	Canadian Ambassador Extraordinary and Plenipotentiary to Belgium and Luxembourg; March 1, 1973 – January 8, 1974	Succeeded by Jean-Yves Grenon
Preceded by Pierre Dupuy	Canadian Ambassador Extraordinary and Plenipotentiary to France; February 20, 1964 – October 31, 1968	Succeeded by Paul André Beaulieu
Preceded by Léon Mayrand	Canadian Ambassador Extraordinary and Plenipotentiary to Italy; 28 May 1962 – April 17, 1964	Succeeded by Gordon Gale Crean
Preceded by L. Dana Wilgress	Canadian Ambassador and Permanent Representative to the North Atlantic Council; September 25, 1958 – July 5, 1962	Succeeded by George Ignatieff
Preceded by Charles Pierre Hébert	Canadian Ambassador Extraordinary and Plenipotentiary to Mexico; October 14, 1953 – July 8, 1954	Succeeded by Douglas Seaman Cole
