= Chris Westdal =

Canadian diplomat (born 1947)

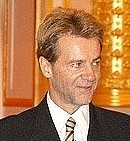
- Chris Westdal in 2003

Canadian Ambassador to Ireland
- In office September 20, 2006 – December 7, 2006

Canadian Ambassador to Russia
- In office July 15, 2003 – July 28, 2006

Canadian Ambassador to Ukraine
- In office August 1995 – August 1998

Canadian Ambassador to South Africa
- In office August 1991 – 1993

Canadian Ambassador to Burma and Bangladesh
- In office September 1982 – 1985

Personal details
- Born: September 13, 1947 (age 79) Swan River Valley, Manitoba
- Occupation: Diplomat

Christopher William Westdal (born September 13, 1947) is a Canadian former ambassador.

== Early life and education ==
Born in Swan River Valley, Manitoba, he obtained a bachelor's degree in political science from St. John's College in Winnipeg.

== Career ==
He is a former Ambassador to Ireland having served from September 2006 to December 2006, and Russia, from 2003 to 2006. Westdal served as Canadian Ambassador to the United Nations in Geneva from 1999 to 2003; He was the ambassador to Ukraine from January 1996 to August 1998.; South Africa from 1991 to 1993 and Bangladesh & Burma from 1982 to 1985. Westdal's assignments abroad included India and Nepal from 1973 to 1975, responsible for Canadian International Development Agency ("CIDA") programming and Tanzania from 1970 to 1973.

Westdal is a member of the Canada Eurasia Russia Business Association (CERBA). He was the board chair of Silver Bear, a Russian mining company, until he resigned due to the Russian invasion of Ukraine.

== Controversy ==
He is noted for having defended the reputation of Vladimir Putin prior to the Russian invasion of Ukraine, notably before the media and several parliamentary committees. He is quoted as having previously referred to Putin as one of the "finest leaders Russia’s had in centuries".
