= George Ignatieff =

Canadian diplomat (1913–1989)

Count George Ignatieff CC
- Георгий Игнатьев
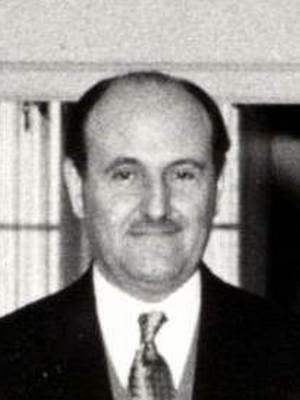

27th Chancellor of the University of Toronto
- In office 1980–1986
- President: James Milton Ham; David Strangway; George Connell
- Preceded by: Arthur B. B. Moore
- Succeeded by: John Black Aird

9th Provost of Trinity College, Toronto
- In office 1972–1978
- Chancellor: Howard Clark
- Preceded by: Derwyn R. G. Owen
- Succeeded by: Kenneth Hare

Canadian Ambassador to the United Nations
- In office July 1966 – February 1969
- Prime Minister: Lester B. Pearson; Pierre Trudeau
- Preceded by: Pierre Tremblay
- Succeeded by: Yvon Beaulne

Permanent Representative of Canada to the North Atlantic Treaty Organization
- In office 1962–1966
- Prime Minister: John Diefenbaker; Lester B. Pearson
- Preceded by: Jules Léger
- Succeeded by: Charles Ritchie

Personal details
- Born: Georgy Pavlovich Ignatieff; 16 December 1913 Saint Petersburg, Russian Empire
- Died: 10 August 1989 (aged 75) Toronto, Canada
- Citizenship: Canadian
- Spouse: Alison Grant
- Children: 2, including Michael
- Parent: Count Paul Ignatieff (father)
- Education: Trinity College, Toronto; Trinity College, Oxford
- Awards: Rhodes Scholarship (1936); Companion of the Order of Canada (1973); Pearson Medal of Peace (1984)

Count George Pavlovich Ignatieff CC (Russian: Георгий Павлович Игнатьев, romanized: Georgy Pavlovich Ignatyev; 16 December 1913 – 10 August 1989) was a Russian-born Canadian diplomat. His career spanned nearly five decades in World War II and the postwar period.

== Early life and education ==
Count Ignatieff was born in Saint Petersburg, Russian Empire, the youngest of five sons, to a distinguished Russian noble family. His mother was Princess Natalia Nikolayevna Meshcherskaya and his father was Count Pavel Ignatiev, a close advisor to Tsar Nicholas II, serving as his last minister of education. In 1918, the year after the Russian Revolution, his family fled to England, and later moved to Canada. George Ignatieff was educated at St Paul's School, London, Lower Canada College, and the University of Trinity College, University of Toronto, before being awarded a Rhodes Scholarship to study at Oxford University, receiving an M.A. in Slavic Studies in 1938.

== Wartime service and postwar diplomacy ==
With the advent of World War II, Ignatieff joined the Royal Artillery, where he worked in photographic intelligence. In 1940 he joined the Canadian Department of External Affairs. He became personal assistant to the Canadian High Commissioner in London, Vincent Massey, and during his London posting began a friendship with Lester Pearson, later Prime Minister of Canada. Ignatieff also served as the wartime Canadian delegate to the International Red Cross.

Ignatieff was a key figure in Canadian diplomacy and international relations through the postwar period. He was Ambassador to Yugoslavia (1956–1958), permanent representative to NATO (1963–1966), Canadian Ambassador to the United Nations (1966–1969) and president of the United Nations Security Council (1968–1969). In 1984 Ignatieff was appointed Ambassador for Disarmament by Prime Minister John Turner.

Ignatieff was unimpressed by the foreign policy of the Trudeau governments of the 1970s and 1980s, and was unafraid to provoke government functionaries. He advocated cautious realignment of Canadian defence policy, and a complete nuclear test ban. Like his mentor Pearson, Ignatieff believed in the interdependence of nations, and had an acute prescience for the impending threats of terror, economic breakdown, and environmental degradation.

Ignatieff served as Provost of the University of Trinity College from 1972 to 1979, and later as chancellor of the University of Toronto from 1980 to 1986. The University of Trinity College's theatre is named after Ignatieff, and is fondly known as the GIT (pronounced 'jit').

George Ignatieff has been described as the "best Governor General (Canada) never had". His autobiography, The Making of a Peacemonger, was published in 1985 by the University of Toronto Press.

== Personal life ==
Ignatieff married Alison Grant (the granddaughter of George Monro Grant and niece of Vincent Massey) in 1944, and had two sons, Michael and Andrew. The elder, Michael Ignatieff, was Leader of the Liberal Party of Canada and Leader of the Official Opposition from 2008 to 2011.

== Awards and honorary degrees ==
Ignatieff was made a Companion of the Order of Canada in 1973. He received the Pearson Medal of Peace for his work in international service in 1984. He received eight Honorary Degrees from Canadian universities.

- Brock University in St. Catharines, Ontario (LL.D) on 27 May 1969
- University of Saskatchewan in Saskatoon, Saskatchewan (LL.D) on 18 May 1973
- York University in Toronto, Ontario (LL.D) Fall 1975
- Mount Allison University in Sackville, New Brunswick (LL.D) in 1978
- University of Victoria in Victoria, British Columbia (LL.D) in June 1984
- Trent University in Peterborough, Ontario (LL.D) in Fall 1984

Diplomatic posts
Preceded by Pierre Tremblay	Canadian Ambassador to the United Nations; July 1966–February 1969	Succeeded by Yvon Beaulne
Academic offices
Preceded by Derwyn R. G. Owen	Provost of the University of Trinity College; 1972–1978	Succeeded by F. Kenneth Hare
Preceded by Arthur B. B. Moore	Chancellor of the University of Toronto; 1980–1986	Succeeded by John Black Aird
