= Mark McDowell =

Canadian diplomat

Mark Andrew McDowell (born October 8, 1962) is a Canadian diplomat and was the first resident Ambassador of Canada to the Union of the Republic of Myanmar. He is considered an Asia hand and is a specialist in the fields of public diplomacy and digital diplomacy. He has been characterized as "an unconventional diplomat".

In 2016, he took leave from the Canadian foreign service and later resigned. He joined the International Institute for Democracy and Electoral Assistance (IDEA) as the head of International IDEA's Myanmar office. IDEA became the key provider of training on constitutional issues to Myanmar's government, political parties, and the Constitutional Court. It maintained an office embedded in the Union Electoral Commission and offered technical assistance to the Commission. In 2019 IDEA opened an office embedded in Parliament where it offered technical assistance on public finance.

From September 2020 to March 2025 McDowell was The Asia Foundation Country Representative for Myanmar.

== Education ==
Attracted by its "counterculture atmosphere", McDowell attended Innis College at the University of Toronto. He received a MA from University of Toronto in East Asian Studies in 1990

While pursuing PhD studies in the early 1990s, McDowell's focus was on environmental policymaking and the interaction between environment, energy, and development. He published a number of articles on these issues relating to Southeast Asia Development and the Environment in ASEAN on JSTOR and China Energy Strategies and Environmental Constraints in China's Modernization.

In 2018 he attended the Kennedy School of Government as a Fulbright Scholar, earning a Master of Public Administration, and stayed on as a visiting Research Scholar at the Ash Institute for Democratic Governance and Innovation.

In 2021 he received a University of Toronto Arbor Award, given to outstanding alumnae. 2021 Arbor Award Recipients | University of Toronto Alumni.

== Public Diplomacy and E-diplomacy ==
McDowell is known as an innovator in public diplomacy and e-diplomacy. Canada's Globe and Mail credits him with "helping drag the Department of Foreign Affairs into the Internet age", and Canada's former Ambassador to China called him "among the most original of thinkers when it comes to using social media".

=== E-diplomacy ===
Ambassador McDowell is a frequent speaker and participant in e-diplomacy conferences, offering a practitioners perspective. In 2015 he spoke at events organized by the foreign ministries of Armenia and the Netherlands.

He is known for starting Canada's social media presence in China with "canadaweibo" on the Chinese Sina Weibo platform. Canadaweibo grew from zero to 400,000 followers within two years, becoming the second largest and most influential embassy site in China after the USA's. Similarly, he made social media a priority during his posting in Myanmar. In an interview with Mizzima News, he explains that social media was prioritized because the embassy was "starting late, and from scratch, with small budgets. The only way we could compete with other embassies for the attention of the Myanmar people was through cyberspace." By the time McDowell finished his term, the embassy's Facebook page had over 300,000 followers, making it by far the largest Canadian Embassy page in the world.

Since his term ended in September 2016, he started a new page to detail his post-diplomatic life `X-Ambassador to Myanmar, Mark McDowell'.

McDowell's work in e-government is longstanding. He gave the government of Canada's address to the United Nations World Summit on the Information Society in 2002. At that time he also took a leading role in initiatives in Canada related to getting Aboriginal communities online, and disseminating news about the international activities of Canadian Aboriginal peoples.

=== Public Diplomacy ===
McDowell has worked on public diplomacy throughout his diplomatic career, and was a Director of Public Diplomacy and Domestic Outreach in Canada’s Department of Foreign Affairs.

He wrote a brief primer on public diplomacy based on a talk he delivered at the 100th Anniversary Edward R. Murrow Memorial Conference at the Fletcher School for Law and Diplomacy (see www.fletcherforum.org/2012/07/26/32-3/). In a 2010 talk at the Fletcher School on the connection between domestic outreach and public diplomacy abroad, he coined the concept of "Total Diplomacy", engaging and partnering with segments of the domestic audience to achieve foreign policy goals. McDowell has been connected with "panda diplomacy" for his work in bringing a pair of Chinese pandas to Canada, and "sports diplomacy" for his public diplomacy in Myanmar connected with the traditional Burmese sport of chinlone.

A conversation with McDowell forms one of the chapters of Chinese public diplomacy thinker Zhao Qizheng's 2012 book "The Wisdom of Public Diplomacy: Cross-Border Dialogues".

== Diplomatic career ==
=== Myanmar ===
McDowell was named Canada's first ever resident ambassador to Myanmar in March 2013. Because of the long period of sanctions imposed by Canada on Myanmar, the relationship between the two countries was very limited and cold.

Since taking up his job in June 2013, relations warmed considerably, with Canada naming Myanmar a priority country for both trade and aid and opening a visa office. Ambassador McDowell focused much of his attention on supporting grassroots democracy and human rights organizations working on issues such as freedom of speech and voter and civic education. Canada has also started to cooperate on security related issues like border management and prevention of human trafficking.

He has staked out a leading role for Canada in the area of federalism and minority rights, and in the promotion of LGBTIQ rights in this laboratory for democracy. "Pride abroad Canada’s support of LGBTIQ activism in Asia" describes Canada's leading role in supporting the nascent LGBTIQ movement in Myanmar, and McDowell's high profile as a supportive Ambassador.

The Embassy of Canada has had success in rapidly raising Canada's public profile in Myanmar, through both traditional and social media. Its Facebook presence has over 300,000 followers on its Burmese, English, and French pages. The English language page has the highest following of any Canadian Embassy page in the world.

=== China ===
McDowell served in Beijing from 2010-2013. He led the negotiations and logistics of sending a pair of pandas to Canada in 2013.

=== Thailand ===
McDowell was head of the political section in Thailand from 2003-2007. He managed the Embassy throughout the Indian Ocean Tsunami crisis. During his term in Thailand, there was significant unrest in the south of the country, attributed to Muslim terrorism. McDowell led Canada's engagement in this region.

McDowell became known as a champion of LGBTIQ rights. and in Thailand spoke at the First International Asian Gay and Lesbian Studies Conference in Bangkok in 2005, on the topic of marriage equality.

=== Aboriginal Affairs ===
McDowell was deputy Director for Aboriginal Affairs in the Global Issues Bureau from 2001-2003 where he led the "Aboriginal Dimension of Foreign Policy", developing bilateral programs in areas such as education, culture, business, law, and governance linking Canadian Aboriginal peoples to their counterparts. He was in the Canadian delegation to the first two annual sessions of the UN Permanent Forum on Indigenous Issues.

=== Taiwan ===
McDowell served in Taipei from 1997-2001. He became known for his work on re-branding Canada, and as a pioneer of international Aboriginal relations.
