= List of permanent representatives of Canada to NATO =

Permanent Representative of Canada to the North Atlantic Council
- Flag of NATO
- Incumbent; Heidi Hulan since September 2024
- Style: His Excellency
- Member of: North Atlantic Council
- Reports to: Minister of Foreign Affairs; North Atlantic Council
- Nominator: Prime Minister of Canada
- Appointer: Governor General of Canada
- Term length: At His Majesty's pleasure
- Website: Canadian Joint Delegation to NATO

List of ambassadors and permanent representatives to the North Atlantic Treaty Organization (North Atlantic Council)

Ambassador	Start of term	End of term	Appointed by	On the advice of
Arnold Danford Patrick Heeney	1952	1952	Vincent Massey	Louis St. Laurent
Leolyn Wilgress	1953	1958	Vincent Massey	Louis St. Laurent
Jules Léger	1958	1962	Vincent Massey	John Diefenbaker
George Ignatieff	1962	1966	Georges Vanier	John Diefenbaker
Charles Ritchie	1966	1967	Roland Michener	Lester B. Pearson
Ross Campbell	1967	1972	Roland Michener	Lester B. Pearson
Arthur Menzies	1972	1976	Roland Michener	Pierre Trudeau
Joseph Hardy	1976	1980	Jules Léger	Pierre Trudeau
John Halstead	1980	1982	Edward Schreyer	Pierre Trudeau
James Taylor	1982	1985	Edward Schreyer	Pierre Trudeau
Gordon Smith	1985	1990	Jeanne Sauvé	Brian Mulroney
James Bartleman	1990	1994	Ray Hnatyshyn	Brian Mulroney
Admiral John R. Anderson	1994	1997	Ray Hnatyshyn	Jean Chrétien
David Wright	1997	2003	Roméo LeBlanc	Jean Chrétien
Jean-Pierre Juneau	2003	2007	Adrienne Clarkson	Jean Chrétien
Robert McRae	2007	2011	Michaëlle Jean	Stephen Harper
Yves Brodeur	2011	2015	David Johnston	Stephen Harper
Kerry Buck	2015	2019	David Johnston	
David Angell	2019	2024	Julie Payette	Justin Trudeau
Heidi Hulan	2024		Mary Simon	Justin Trudeau
