= James R. Wright =

Canadian diplomat

Canadian High Commissioner to the United Kingdom
- In office 2006–2011
- Prime Minister: Stephen Harper
- Preceded by: Mel Cappe
- Succeeded by: Gordon Campbell

Personal details
- Born: Montreal, Quebec
- Spouse: Donna Thomson
- Education: McGill University
- Occupation: consultant
- Profession: diplomat

James R. Wright is a Canadian retired diplomat, and was Canada's High Commissioner to the United Kingdom of Great Britain and Northern Ireland from August 27, 2006 to September 14, 2011.

Wright was born in Montreal and graduated from McGill University in 1973. He is married to Donna Thomson, and together they have two children, Nicholas and Natalie. He speaks fluent English, French and Russian. He is now a consultant in Ottawa.

== Career ==
- 1976: Joined the Canadian Department of Foreign Affairs, serving in Moscow (1978–1980); Washington DC (1983–1987); and London (1992–1996), where he served as Minister for Political and Public Affairs at the Canadian High Commission.
- 1996–2000: Director General for the Central, East and South Europe Bureau.
- 2000–2004: Political Director and Assistant Deputy Minister for the Global and Security Policy Branch.
- 2005–2006: Political Director and Assistant Deputy Minister for the International Security Branch, and Political Director.
- 2006–2011: Canada's High Commissioner to the UK.
