= Canada–Ukraine relations =

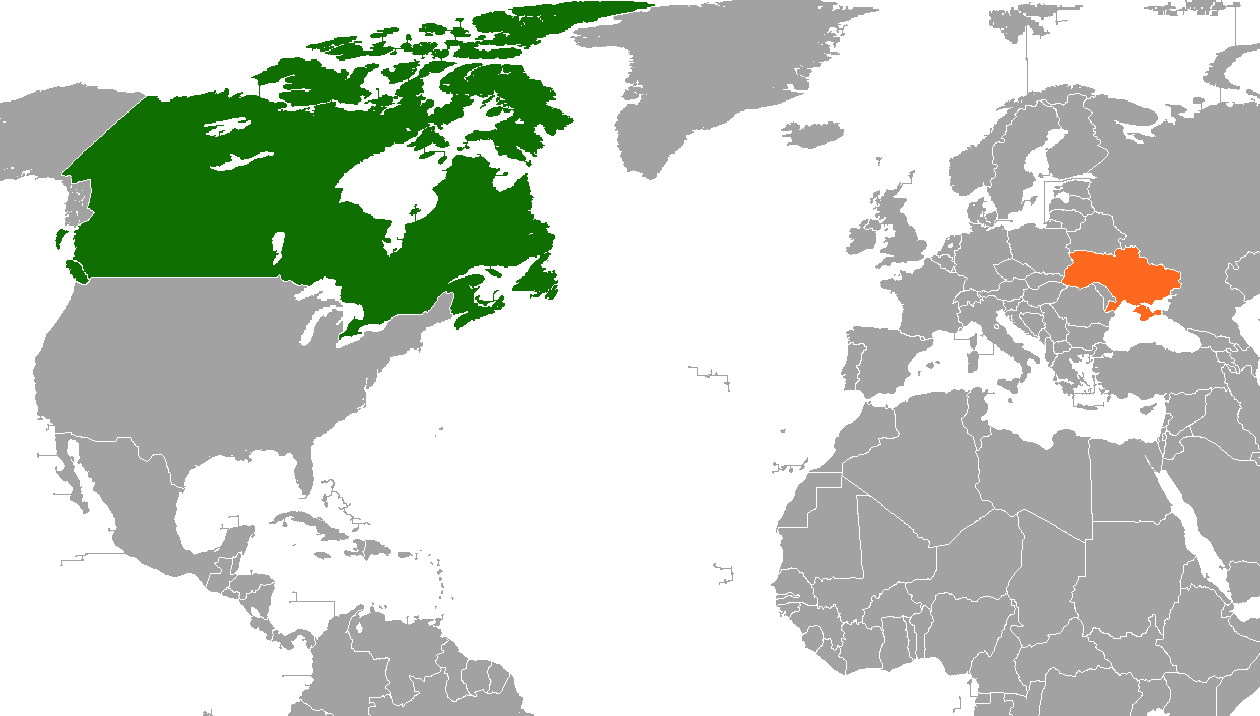

- Canada: Ukraine

Diplomatic relations between Canada and Ukraine were formally established in 1991, following Ukraine's independence from the Soviet Union. However, the two countries' relationship dates back further, due to the long history of Ukrainian immigration to Canada.

== History ==
=== Formal relations ===
Diplomatic relations were established between Canada and Ukraine on December 2, 1991. Canada was the first western nation to recognize Ukraine's independence from the USSR. Canada opened its embassy in Kyiv in April 1992, and the Embassy of Ukraine in Ottawa opened in October of that same year, paid for mostly by donations from the Ukrainian-Canadian community. Ukraine opened a consulate general in Toronto in 1993 and opened another in Edmonton in 2018.

The main bilateral agreement is the joint declaration of the "Special Partnership" between the two countries signed in 1994 and renewed in 2001.

Sales of Canadian military hardware to Ukraine were permitted by the Justin Trudeau government in December 2017 when Global Affairs Canada minister Chrystia Freeland lifted the prior restrictions.

=== Free-trade agreement ===
On September 22, 2009, talks began between Canada and Ukraine on a free trade agreement.

Ukrainian prime minister Arseniy Yatsenyuk and Canadian prime minister Stephen Harper in July 2015 announced the Canada-Ukraine Free Trade Agreement, and signed it in July 2016. It took effect on 1 August 2017.

=== High level visits ===
==== High-level visits from Canada to Ukraine ====
In 1992, the Governor General of Canada, Ramon Hnatyshyn, visited Ukraine—his ancestral homeland with which he closely identified—in his capacity as vice-regent. In 2005 Governor General Adrienne Clarkson made a formal state visit and in 2009 Governor General Michaëlle Jean made another. Canadian prime minister Jean Chrétien visited Ukraine in 1999.

The annexation of Crimea by the Russian Federation occurred in March 2014. In September 2014, Ukrainians visited Ottawa to plead for weapons, including anti-tank missiles, surveillance gear and armoured vehicles, to subdue the separatists on their eastern border. Defence Minister Jason Kenney refused. In March 2014, Canadian Prime Minister Stephen Harper travelled to Kyiv to meet with Ukrainian Prime Minister Arsenii Yatseniuk. He became the first G7 leader to visit the epicentre of Ukraine's recent divisive protests. In June 2014, Canadian Prime Minister Harper attended the inauguration of Ukrainian President Petro Poroshenko in Kyiv. During the visit, Harper met with Poroshenko to reaffirm Canada’s support for Ukraine amid the ongoing conflict in eastern Ukraine and expressed solidarity with Ukraine’s efforts to defend its sovereignty and pursue closer ties with Europe.

In June 2015, Canadian Prime Minister Harper travelled to Kyiv, where he met with President Petro Poroshenko and Prime Minister Arseniy Yatsenyuk amid renewed fighting in eastern Ukraine. During the visit, Harper reaffirmed Canada’s support for Ukraine and discussed international efforts to respond to Russian.

In July 2016, Canadian prime minister Justin Trudeau visited Canadian military trainers in western Ukraine. Petro Poroshenko thanked Canada for its contributions. The two signed a free-trade agreement.

In January 2022, Foreign Minister Mélanie Joly went to Ukraine and met the prime minister and the president amid tensions between Ukraine and Russia. She also visited to Canadian instructors who were training Ukrainians as part of Operation UNIFIER.

In May 2022, Trudeau visited Irpin travelled to Kyiv to meet with President Volodymyr Zelenskyy.

In June 2023, Trudeau travelled to Kyiv to meet with President Volodymyr Zelenskyy and Prime Minister Denys Shmyhal.

In February 2024, Trudeau made the unannounced visit to Kyiv to take part in a display of international solidarity to mark the second anniversary of the Russian invasion of Ukraine, together with European Commission President Ursula von der Leyen, Belgian Prime Minister Alexander De Croo, and Italian Prime Minister Giorgia Meloni.

In February 2025, Trudeau travelled to Kyiv to mark the third anniversary of the Russian invasion of Ukraine.

In August 2025, Prime Minister Mark Carney travelled to Kyiv to meet with President Volodymyr Zelenskyy and Prime Minister Yulia Svyrydenko.

==== High-level visits from Ukraine to Canada ====
Ukraine's President Leonid Kuchma also undertook a visit to Canada in 1994, his first state visit abroad. And in 2008, President Viktor Yushchenko travelled to Canada on a state visit. In Ottawa, he addressed a joint session of the Canadian Parliament's Senate and House of Commons, a rare privilege for foreign dignitaries.

In September 2014, President Petro Poroshenko met with Prime Minister of Canada Stephen Harper and Governor General of Canada David Johnston, took part in the joint session of the Parliament of Canada where he delivered a speech.

Arseniy Yatsenyuk, then former prime minister of Ukraine, visited Ottawa in May 2017 seeking weapons and met with Chrystia Freeland and Ralph Goodale.

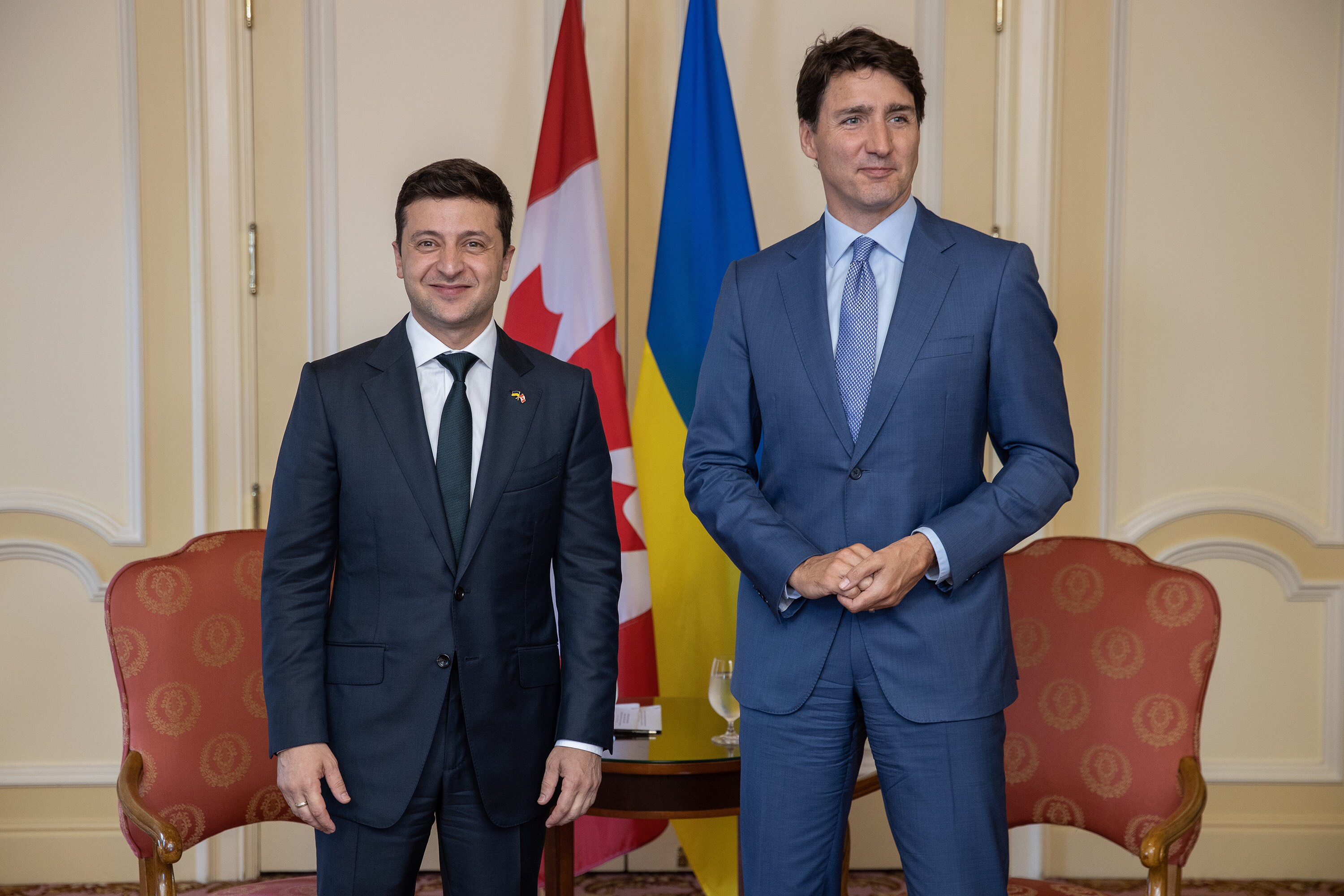
Ukraine President Volodymyr Zelenskyy meets Canadian Prime Minister Justin Trudeau during the Ukraine Reform Conference in Toronto.

In July 2019, the third Ukraine Reform Conference was held in Toronto for three days, where more than 800 people from 36 countries, as well as international finance organizations such as the IMF, took part. The theme was Euro-Atlantic integration of Ukraine. Newly inaugurated President Volodymyr Zelenskyy announced a new agreement for Canadian military hardware to be used as part of the effort to subdue the separatists in the east along the border with Russia. Justin Trudeau refused to sign the agreement. Trudeau and Zelenskyy "declared a mutual interest in improving student exchanges and youth work permits" but nothing was done, and money was found to "promote gender equality".

On September 22, 2023, Zelenskyy spoke to the Canadian Parliament. Zelenskyy joined Prime Minister Justin Trudeau and the rest of Parliament as they gave a standing ovation to Yaroslav Hunka, introduced by the speaker of the House of Commons, Anthony Rota, as a "veteran from the Second World War who fought for Ukrainian independence against the Russians." It was later discovered that Hunka did so in a Ukrainian Division of the SS, a Nazi-aligned unit. The incident made international news, receiving widespread criticism and condemnation. The speaker then resigned and Trudeau apologized on behalf of Parliament. In the aftermath, an endowment in Hunka's name at the University of Alberta's Canadian Institute of Ukrainian Studies shut down, and Jewish organizations called for open records on Nazi war criminals.

In June 2025, Zelenskyy travelled to Kananaskis to meet with Prime Minister Mark Carney and to attend the 51st G7 summit.

=== 2026 Partnership ===
On 10 September 2026 in Calgary, President Zelenskyy and Prime Minister Carney signed a “Canada-Ukraine declaration for a 100-year partnership“.

== Politics ==
Canada wants to promote democratic reform in Ukraine, encouraging Ukraine to engage and possibly join the EU and NATO, and distance itself from Russia. Reform are a delicate matter in Ukraine, because the East vs. West trajectory (Russia vs. Europe) of the country is a sensitive political issue in Ukraine. Direct involvement in reform efforts by Canadian officials would violate international protocol (seen as interference in Ukraine's internal affairs), and possibly undercut pro-Western efforts in the country. Many Canadians (including members of parliament, and former Prime Minister John Turner) were part of an international observer team that monitored Ukraine's 2004 presidential election. Canadian media were typically sympathetic to the Orange Revolution, with the national magazine Maclean's running a front-page story on the protests. Election irregularities documented by observer teams in 2004 led to a redo of the election, which resulted in the victory of pro-Western presidential candidate Viktor Yushchenko. Canadian Governor-General Adrienne Clarkson, Canada's head-of-state, attended Yushchenko's investiture wearing an orange scarf, the colour of the pro-Western movement.

Former Deputy Prime Minister Chrystia Freeland's maternal grandparents and mother emigrated from Ukraine. She was actively engaged with pro-democracy and pro-Western movements in Ukraine during the late 1980s. In 2017, allegations circulated in the Russian and Canadian press that Freeland's grandfather, whom she had described as a political exile "with a responsibility to keep alive the idea of an independent Ukraine," had been a Nazi propagandist, which her office denied and she implied were Russian disinformation. However, it was later proven that her grandfather had indeed been the editor of a Nazi newspaper in Poland, and that she had known this for at least twenty years.

== Sub-national ties ==
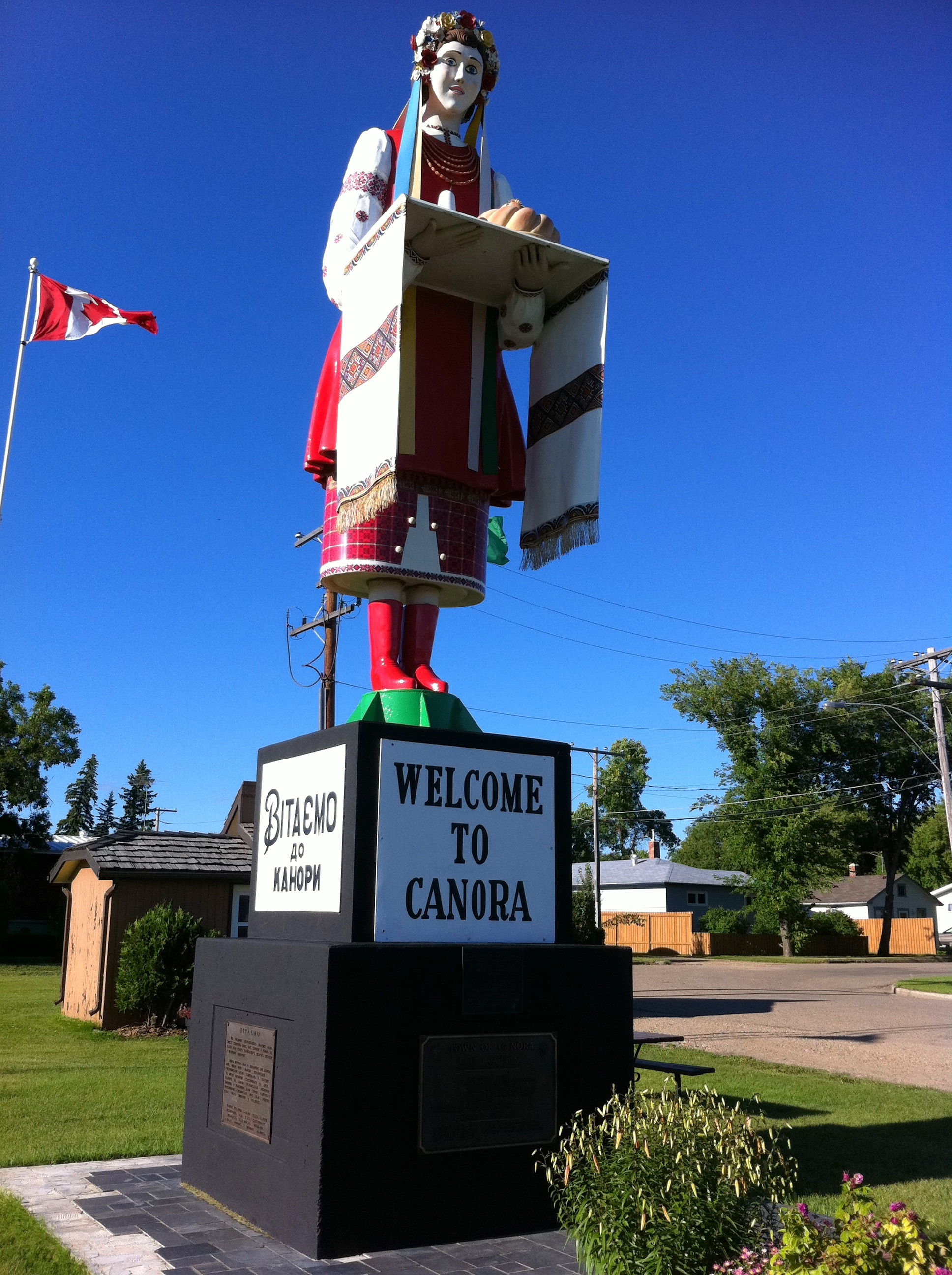
The "Welcome to Canora" statue, "Lesia"

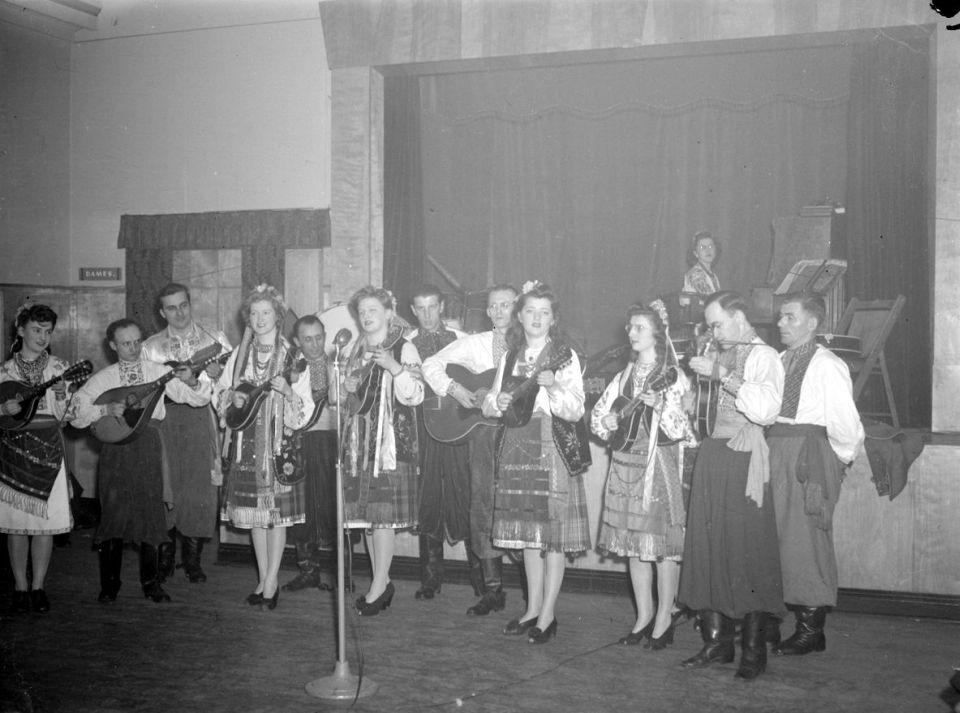
Ukrainian Mandolin Orchestra in May 1945

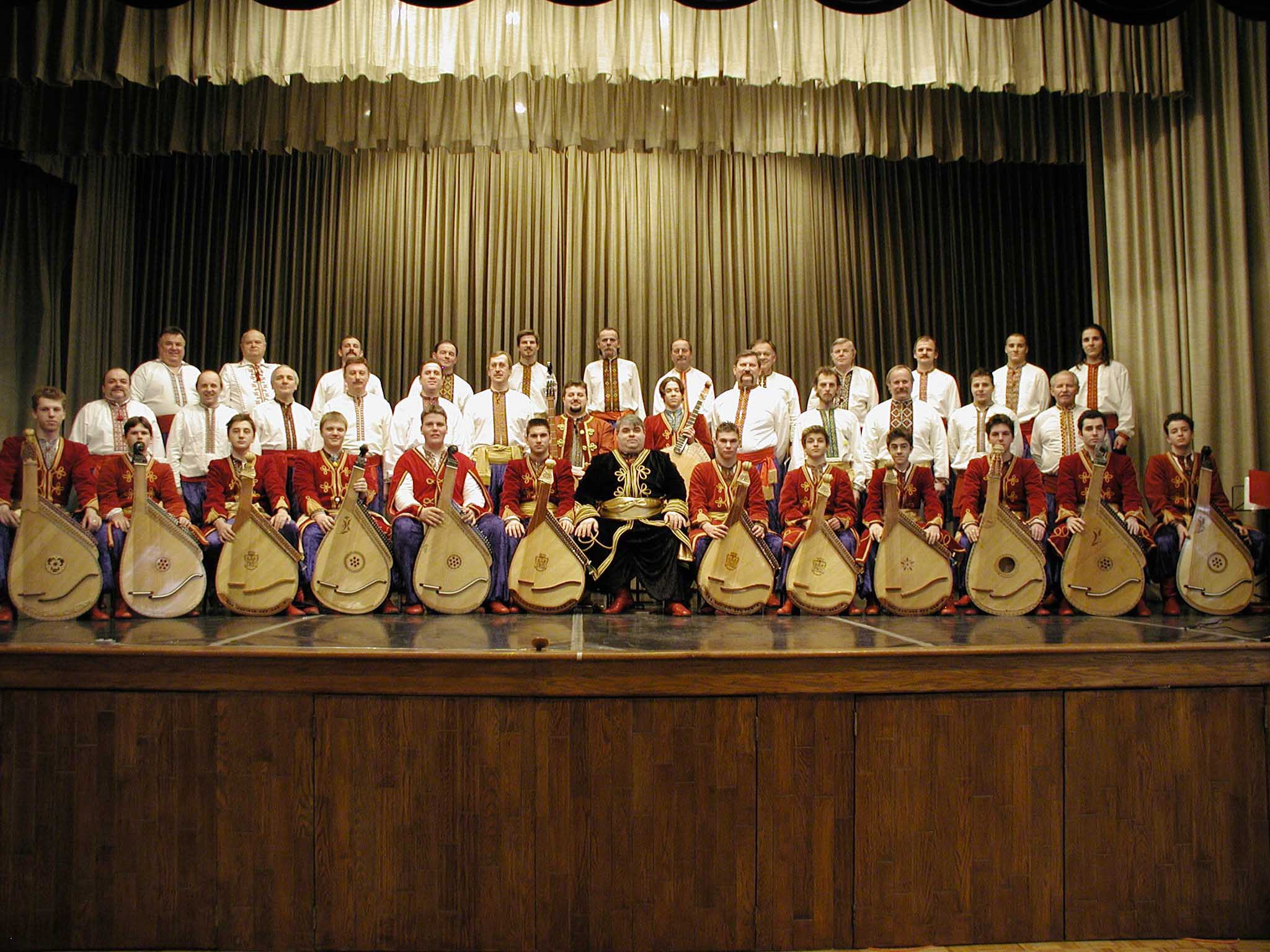
The Canadian Bandurist Capella in 2003

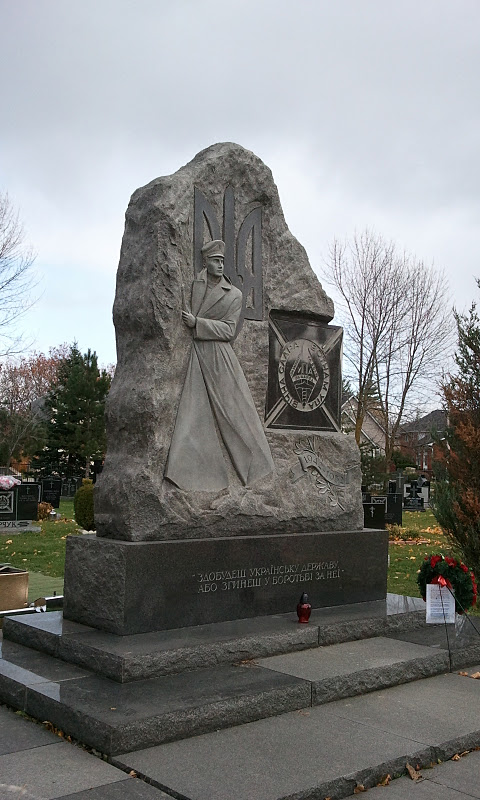
Monument to UPA veterans at St. Volodymyr Ukrainian Cemetery in Oakville, Ontario

Much of the relationship is based on the legacy of migration fo Canada. Ukrainians did not migrate to Canada equally from all parts of Ukraine, or settle equally everywhere in Canada. In the late nineteenth and early twentieth centuries Ukrainian immigrants settled in the Canadian prairies and account for the region's strong ties to Ukraine, especially Western Ukraine, from which most majority of them had come. Ontario also drew Ukrainian immigrants, especially in the immediate post-war period. Prevented during the Soviet period, migration to Canada from Ukraine resumed after its 1991 independence under provincial immigration programs. Migrants came to Saskatchewan and Manitoba after they set up these programs, having identified Ukraine as a potentially significant source of skilled workers.

Most Ukrainians who migrated to Alberta between 1893 and 1929 came from a few small districts in western Ukraine, many of them in the current Ivano-Frankivsk Oblast. Alberta premier Ralph Klein visited Ivano-Frankivsk in 2002, and governor of Ivano-Frankivsk Mykhailo Vyshyvaniuk reciprocated with a visit to Edmonton in which the two governments signed a trade and cooperation agreement. Alberta was expected to sign a similar agreement with neighbouring Lviv Oblast.

Premier Roy Romanow's also visited Ukraine in 1995 and invited Ukrainian president Leonid Kuchma to Saskatchewan in 2000. Delegations at the ministerial level to Ukraine from Alberta, Manitoba and Saskatchewan led to agreements and memoranda of understanding on culture, education and economic matters. The prairie provinces also established formal advisory committees:

- Saskatchewan-Ukraine Advisory Committee
- Manitoba-Ukraine Secretariat
- Advisory Council on Alberta-Ukraine Relations).

Beyond a number of regional twinning agreements, e.g. Saskatchewan-Chernivtsi oblast, a number of Canadian cities are also twinned with Ukrainian municipal counterparts at the local level, including Toronto/Kyiv, Winnipeg/Lviv, Vancouver/Odesa, and Saskatoon/Chernivtsi.

- (Ukraine) Kyiv and Toronto (Ontario)
- (Ukraine) Chernivtsi and Saskatoon (Saskatchewan)
- (Ukraine) Lviv and Winnipeg (Manitoba)
- (Ukraine) Odesa and Vancouver (British Columbia)
- (Ukraine) Uzhhorod and Hamilton (Ontario)
- (Ukraine) Dnipro and Durham Region (Ontario)
- (Ukraine) Kamianets-Podilskyi and Brantford (Ontario)
- (Ukraine) Sokal and North Grenville (Ontario)
- (Ukraine) Vashkivtsi and Sioux Lookout (Ontario)
- (Ukraine) Stryi and Vegreville (Alberta)

== Humanitarian and development aid to Ukraine ==
Canadian organizations, both governmental and non-governmental, are active in providing different kinds of aid to Ukraine. Canadian International Development Agency (CIDA) funded the establishment of Centre for Small Business and Economic Development (SBEDIF) in Ivano-Frankivsk. An additional CA$3.8 million was committed for a regional network project to support small business growth and economic development in five additional communities in the same oblast of Western Ukraine.

The Canada-Ukraine Chamber of Commerce (CUCC) plays an important role in promoting trade and business ties between the two countries.

In 2016, Global Affairs Canada established the Canada-Ukraine Trade and Investment Support (CUTIS) Project, which is budgeted for five years and was designed "to lower poverty in Ukraine through increasing exports from Ukraine to Canada and investment from Canada to Ukraine".

As recently as July 2016 Canadian non-governmental organizations also have substantially provided aid to the Ukrainian army and set up rehabilitation clinics for Ukrainian soldiers during the War in Donbas.

On 22 March 2022, Reuters News, which employed Freeland for a decade, had an article titled "On the Ukraine refugee crisis, watch Canada", and then in early April 2022 the Trudeau government cleared the immigration barriers for Ukrainian refugees.

Ukrainians approved under the CUAET were allowed to travel to Canada until March 31, 2024. Afterward, they were subject to the standard immigration measures available to others around the world. In 2024, Canada admitted only 6,780 new permanent residents from Ukraine. People coming to Canada from Ukraine under the CUAET scheme were legally considered to be temporary residents rather than refugees. They were granted the right to work or study in Canada for three years but do not get the right to automatic permanent residency like refugees from Syria or Afghanistan.

== Educational contacts ==
The longest standing educational partnership at the post-secondary level is that of between the University of Saskatchewan and Chernivtsi National University, in existence since 1977. The relationship, however, currently operates through the Ramon Hnatyshyn Canadian Studies Centre, a research and teaching unit created in 2003 and devoted to Canadian studies at Chernivtsi National University. The National University of Kyiv-Mohyla Academy also established a Canadian Studies Center in 2009 to foster greater contact and scholarly exchange.

Bilateral exchanges between Canadian and Ukrainian universities exist in the sciences, social sciences and humanities. Canadian universities and colleges with active exchange programs include: University of Alberta, University of Manitoba, University of Saskatchewan, University of Toronto, Queen's University, St. Thomas More College and MacEwan University.

In 1991, with the support of the Ukrainian Studies Foundation of Toronto, the Canada-Ukraine Parliamentary Program (CUPP) was created. CUPP has provided Ukrainian university students with an opportunity to learn how democracy functions in Canada by working closely with Canadian Members of Parliament of all parties. Ukrainian students are competitively selected from among 48 participating institutions of higher-learning in Ukraine.

== Response to the Russo-Ukrainian War ==
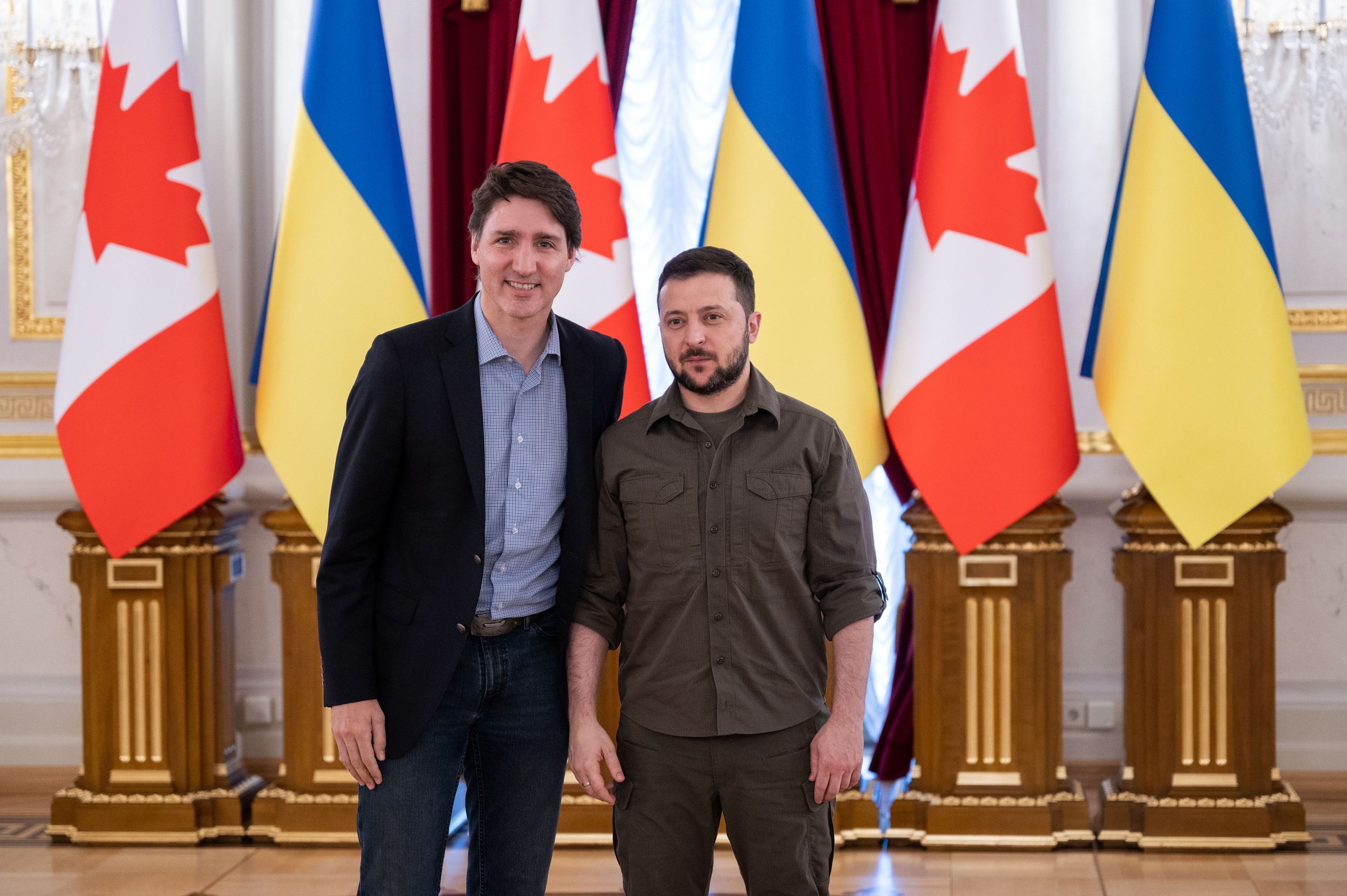
Zelenskyy and Trudeau in Kyiv, Ukraine on May 8, 2022

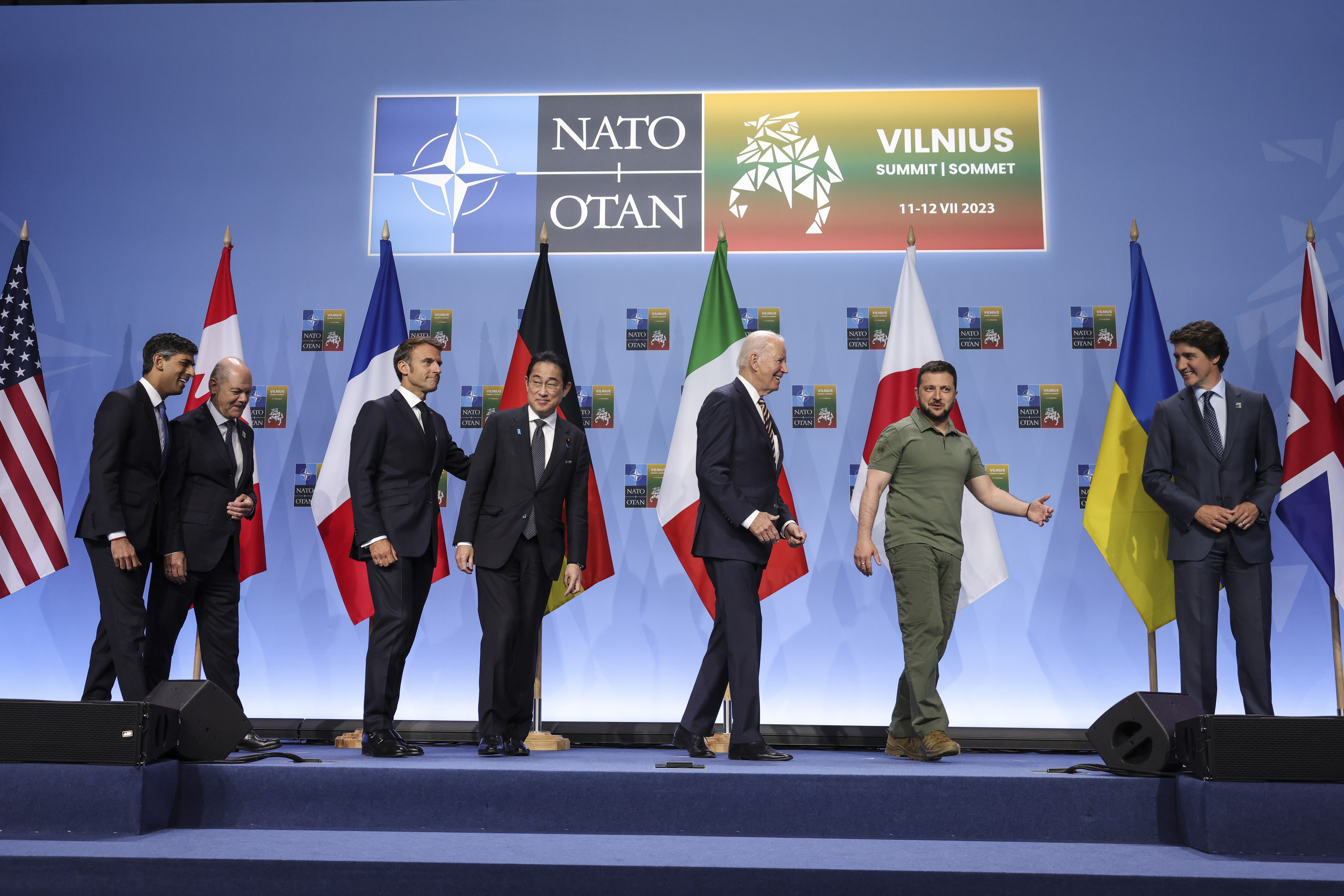
Zelenskyy and Trudeau at the NATO Summit in Vilnius on July 12, 2023

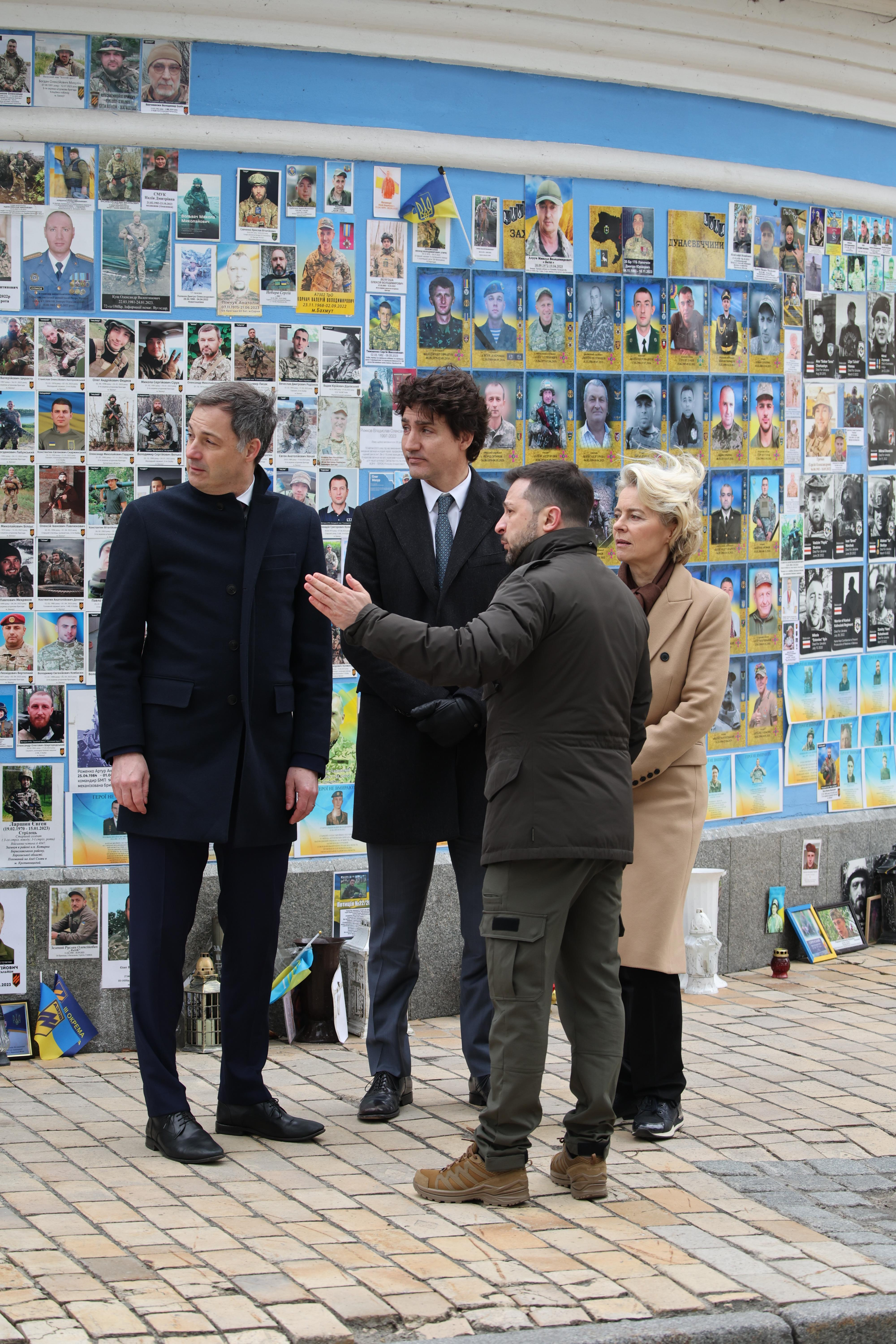
Zelenskyy, Trudeau and Ursula von der Leyen in Kyiv, Ukraine on February 24, 2024

Since the February 2014 annexation of Crimea by the Russian Federation, diplomatic relations between Russia and Ukraine have had a military dimension. Annexation occurred during the 41st Canadian Parliament, during which the country was governed by the Harper Ministry, with Rob Nicholson as Minister of Defence.

On 17 April 2014, the Canadian Armed Forces (CAF) offered assets and members to NATO and called this engagement Operation REASSURANCE. In September 2014 the Ukrainians visited Ottawa to plead for weapons, like anti-tank missiles, surveillance gear and armoured vehicles, with which to subdue the eastern separatists along the border with Russia. Their quest did not bear fruit.

At the Brussels NATO Ministerial conference in February 2015, Nicholson offered no weapons to Ukraine, agreeing with Ursula von der Leyen then the German Minister of Defense. "We've been very clear in our support for Ukraine. We've signed a defense cooperation agreement, and we have been sending considerable non-lethal aid to Ukraine over the last number of months, as well as assistance in other forms, and that's what we're going to continue." On 14 April 2015 the new Minister of National Defence, Jason Kenney, announced Canadian military personnel would instruct Ukrainian forces as part of a $700 million gift he called Operation UNIFIER.

It came to light in July 2015 while Stephen Harper was still in power, that more than 5,400 Eryx anti-tank missiles, 10 Husky VMMD and Buffalo (mine protected vehicle), four specialized landmine detection systems and 194 LAV-II Light Armoured Vehicles had been declared surplus by the Canadian military instead of being sent to aid the Ukrainians.

On 4 November 2015 Justin Trudeau inaugurated his 29th Canadian Ministry, having won a majority in elections for the 42nd Canadian Parliament. He appointed Harjit Sajjan as his first Minister of Defence. Sales of Canadian military hardware to Ukraine were permitted by the government of Trudeau in December 2017, as Global Affairs Canada minister Chrystia Freeland lifted restrictions.

Soon after the 2019 Canadian federal election was won by Trudeau, who had faced down Andrew Scheer, a supporter of sending Canadian peacekeepers to Ukraine, Ukrainian deputy foreign minister Vasyl Bodnar in the government of Volodymyr Zelenskyy revived the idea of sending Canadian peacekeepers to the war-torn Donbas territory of Ukraine.

Freeland was named Minister of Finance in August 2020 after the previous minister, Bill Morneau, refused to accede to Trudeau's request for more helicopter money and because he was lukewarm on the goals of the WEF. The position gave her command of such tools as FINTRAC. Freeland was accused by the KGB of promoting anti-Soviet sentiment in Kyiv in the late 1980s.

On 1 February 2022, rumours of open conflict were thick and a helpful list of Canadian sanctions tools was provided by consultant attorneys. There were then three pieces of secondary legislation that collectively formed the "Sanctions Regime":

- Special Economic Measures (Russia) Regulations (SEMRR)
- Special Economic Measures (Ukraine) Regulations (SEMUR)
- Freezing Assets of Corrupt Foreign Officials (Ukraine) Regulations (FACFOUR)

On 23 February, Canada announced first round of new economic sanctions on Russia over its build-up to its invasion of Ukraine. The United States, the European Union, Germany and Britain also announced financial punishments of Russia. Trudeau said his government "will ban Canadians from all financial dealings with the so-called" DPR and LPR. He was also to "ban Canadians from engaging in purchases of Russian sovereign debt." Trudeau promised to "sanction members of the Russian parliament who voted for the decision to recognize Donetsk and Luhansk as independent."

On 24 February Russia invaded Ukraine.

On 27 February, Omar Alghabra ordered Transport Canada to close Canadian airspace to Russian owned aircraft. The next day there was some confusion over "humanitarian" flights by Russian aircraft. On 3 March Freeland sanctioned Russian companies Rosneft and Gazprom. Canada had already banned Russian vessels from its waters. On 5 March Freeland removed Russia and Belarus from "most-favored nation status", which automatically places a mandatory 35% tariff on all imports from the two countries.

On 6 March, Transport Canada fined the owners of a plane that was chartered by Russians. Russians can still travel as passengers. On 7 March Canada imposed sanctions on 10 Russian individuals in connection with the invasion of Ukraine. On 12 March Transport Canada grounded a Volga Dnepr An-124 Russian airliner it had contracted, as it intended to enforce a Notice to Airmen drafted for the occasion. The regulator said it "will not hesitate to take further enforcement action should additional incidents of non-compliance with the regulations and restrictions be found." On 15 March 15 more Russian officials were sanctioned. More than 900 "individuals and entities" had been targeted by then. The Russians responded on 15 March and targeted 313 Canadian individuals. On 18 March a report documented the Russian seizure of Canadian (and other) flagged aircraft.

The L3 Harris Wescam gyro-compensated cameras were revealed to be the choice of the manufacturer of the Bayraktar UAV for their drones were pledged by the Trudeau government in late March.

On 24 March, it was revealed to a Parliamentary committee that the CAF had barred its active-duty service members from entering the Ukraine Foreign Legion.

Before 21 April, Canada had sent 4,500 M-72 rocket launchers and 100 Carl Gustaf anti-tank systems to Ukraine. On 22 April Canada sent from its warehouse of 37 units an unknown number of 155mm M777 Howitzers. On 26 April Canada pledged to send eight Rohsel light armoured vehicles to Ukraine.

On 8 May, Prime Minister Justin Trudeau made a surprise visit to Kyiv to meet with Ukrainian president Volodymyr Zelenskyy.

On 8 June, Foreign Minister Mélanie Joly announced a ban under the SEMRR on the export of 28 services vital for the operation of the oil, gas and chemical industries, including technical, management, accounting and advertising services.

On August 25, 2025, Prime Minister Mark Carney visited Kyiv, where he said he has not ruled out deploying Canadian troops to Ukraine as part of the Coalition of the Willing, at President Zelensky’s request for security guarantees against Russia. During the visit, Carney detailed Canada’s $2 billion aid package announced at the G7 Summit, including over $1 billion for drones, munitions, and armored vehicles, $680 million for NATO-prioritized equipment, and plans for joint production of drones in Ukraine. Senior Canadian cabinet minister Chrystia Freeland resigned from cabinet to be appointed as special representative for the reconstruction of Ukraine in 2025.

== Resident diplomatic missions ==
of Canada in Ukraine

- Kyiv (Embassy)

of Ukraine in Canada

- Ottawa (Embassy)
- Edmonton (Consulate-General)
- Toronto (Consulate-General)

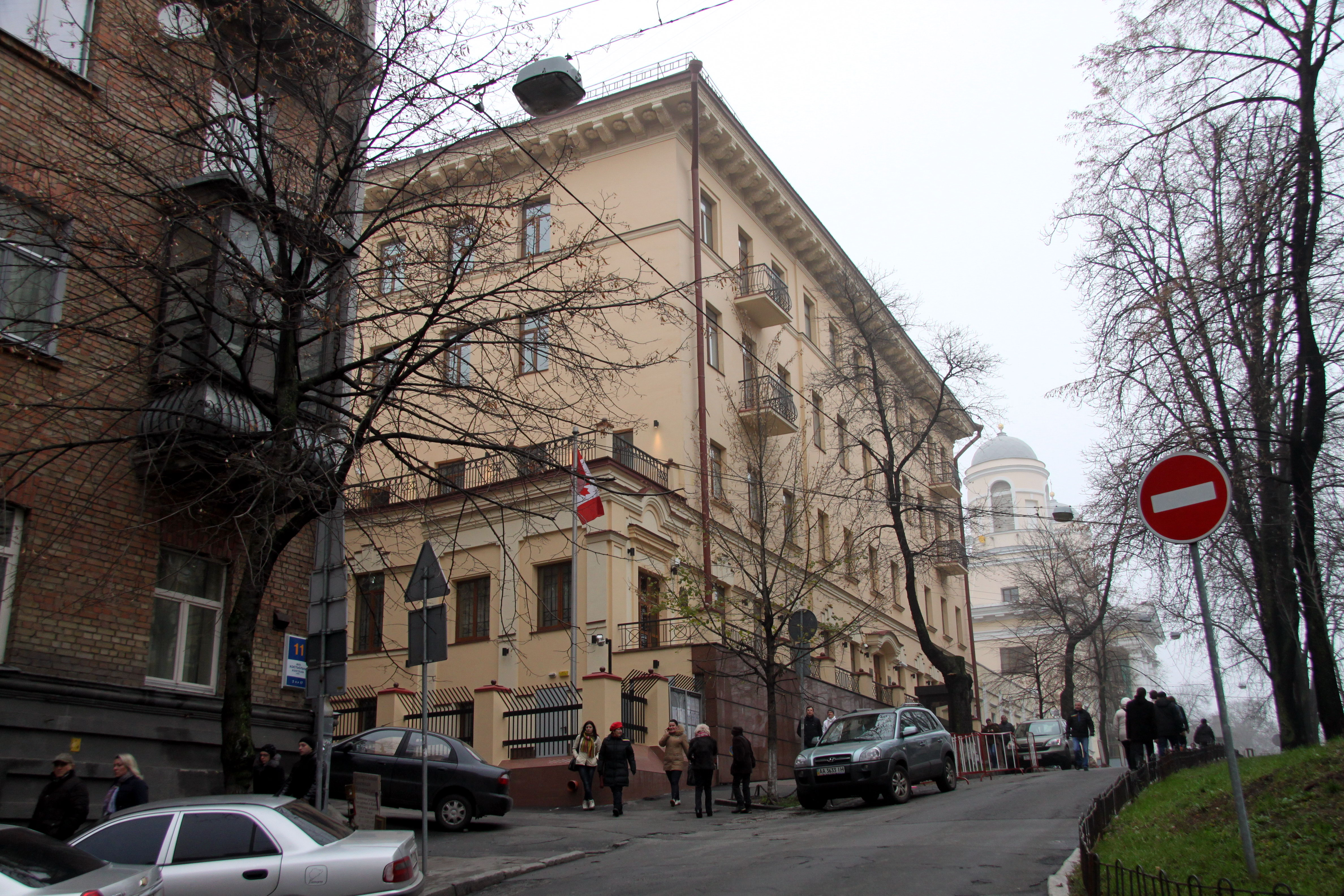
Embassy of Canada in Kyiv

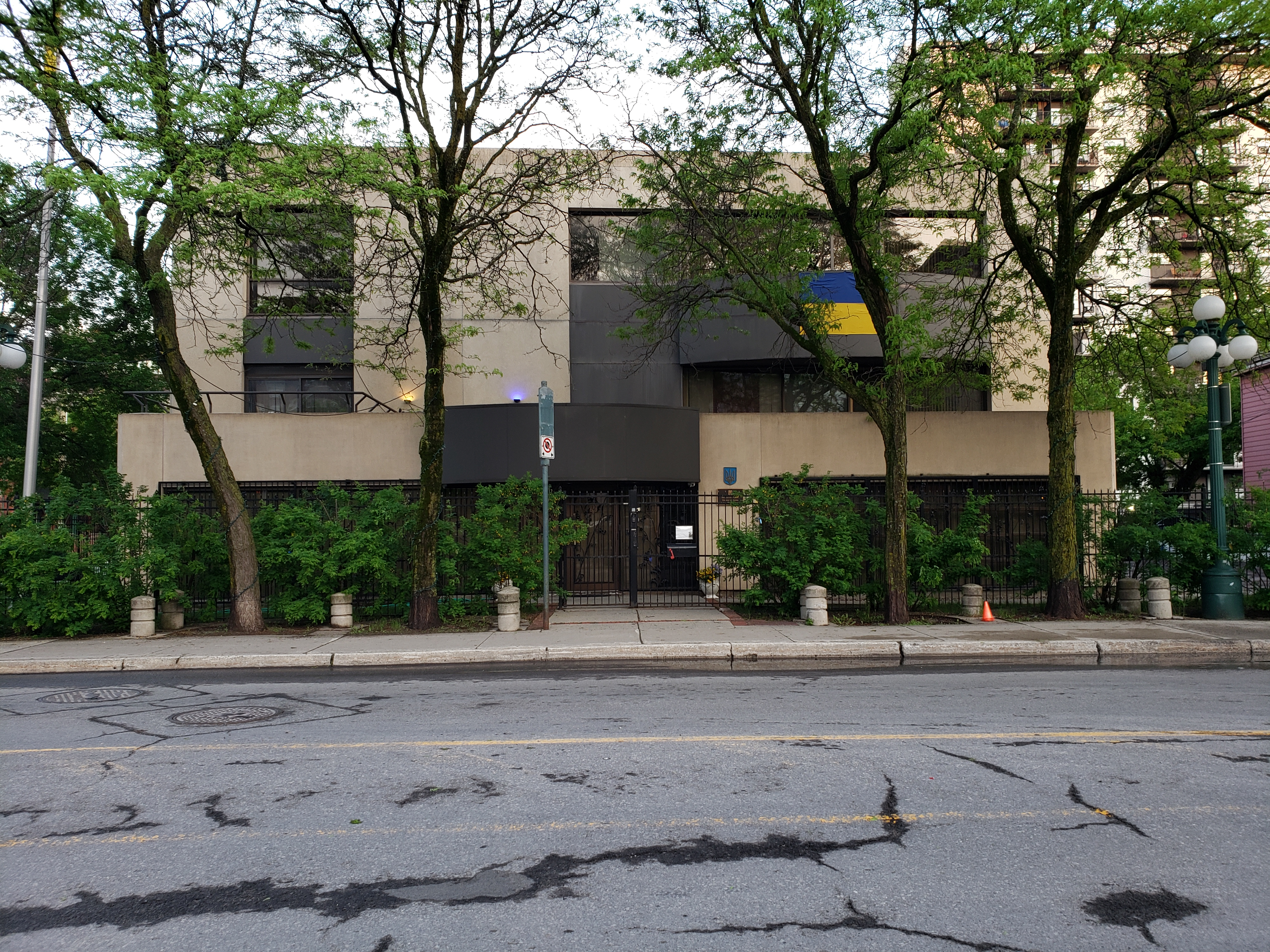
Embassy of Ukraine in Ottawa

Building hosting the Consulate-General of Ukraine in Edmonton

== See also ==
- Foreign relations of Canada
- Foreign relations of Ukraine
- Ukrainian Canadian
- Canadian Ukrainian
- Embassy of Ukraine, Ottawa
- Anti-Ukrainian sentiment in Canada
- Canada–Ukraine Free Trade Agreement (CUFTA)
- Cyclone-4M
