= Pearson =

Pearson may refer to:

== Organizations ==
=== Education ===
- Lester B. Pearson College, Victoria, British Columbia, Canada
- Pearson College (UK), London, owned by Pearson PLC
- Lester B. Pearson High School (disambiguation)

=== Companies ===
- Pearson plc, a British media conglomerate and book publisher
  - Pearson Education, the textbook division of Pearson PLC
    - Pearson-Longman, an imprint of Pearson Education
- Pearson Yachts

== Places ==
- Pearson, Georgia, a US city
- Pearson, Texas, an unincorporated community in the US
- Pearson, Victoria, a ghost town in Australia
- Pearson, Wisconsin, an unincorporated community in the US
- Toronto Pearson International Airport, in Toronto, Ontario, Canada
- Pearson Field, in Vancouver, Washington, US
- Pearson Island, an island in South Australia which is part of the Pearson Isles
- Pearson Isles, an island group in South Australia

== Other uses ==
- Pearson (surname)
- Pearson correlation coefficient, a statistical measure known as Pearson's r
- Pearson (motorcycle), a British motorcycle with an Ateliers de Construction Mecanique l'Aster engine
- Pearson (TV series), an American television series that is a spin-off of Suits

== See also ==
- Pearson's (disambiguation)
- Pearson Peacekeeping Centre, a Canadian NGO supporting international peace
- Pearson Air Museum
- Pearson v. Chung, $67 million lawsuit over a pair of pants
- Justice Pearson (disambiguation)
- Persson
