= Justin Pearson =

Justin Pearson may refer to:

- Justin Pearson (musician) (born 1975), American vocalist and bassist for The Locust, Dead Cross, etc.
- Justin Pearson (stuntman) (born 1971), English film stuntman and stunt coordinator
- Justin J. Pearson (born 1995), American politician and Tennessee state representative

== See also ==
- Justin Tanner Petersen (1960–2010), American hacker
- Justice Pearson (disambiguation)
