= Lester B. Pearson =

Prime Minister of Canada from 1963 to 1968

The Right Honourable Lester B. Pearson PC OM CC OBE
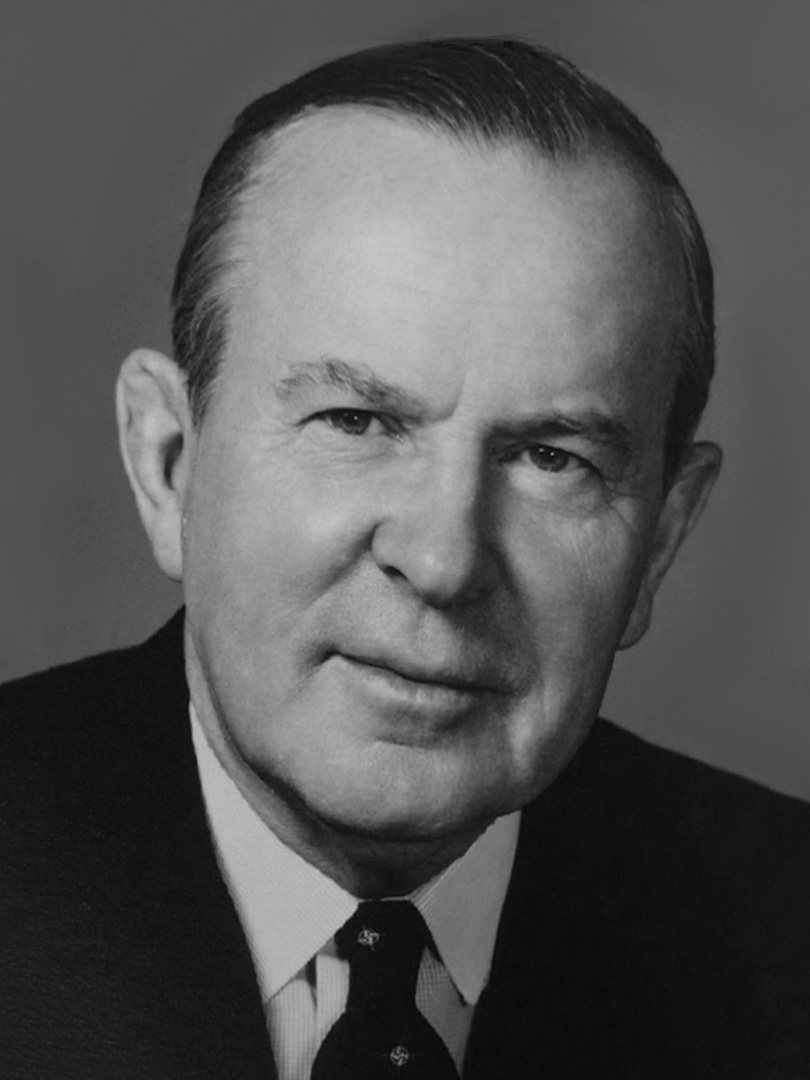
- Portrait, c. 1963

14th Prime Minister of Canada
- In office 22 April 1963 – 20 April 1968
- Monarch: Elizabeth II
- Governors General: Georges Vanier; Roland Michener
- Preceded by: John Diefenbaker
- Succeeded by: Pierre Trudeau

Leader of the Opposition
- In office 16 January 1958 – 22 April 1963
- Prime Minister: John Diefenbaker
- Preceded by: Louis St. Laurent
- Succeeded by: John Diefenbaker

Leader of the Liberal Party
- In office 16 January 1958 – 6 April 1968
- Preceded by: Louis St. Laurent
- Succeeded by: Pierre Trudeau

7th President of the United Nations General Assembly
- In office 14 October 1952 – 23 April 1953
- Preceded by: Luis Padilla Nervo
- Succeeded by: Vijaya Lakshmi Pandit

Secretary of State for External Affairs
- In office 10 September 1948 – 20 June 1957
- Prime Minister: W. L. Mackenzie King; Louis St. Laurent
- Preceded by: Louis St. Laurent
- Succeeded by: John Diefenbaker

Member of Parliament for Algoma East
- In office 25 October 1948 – 25 June 1968
- Preceded by: Thomas Farquhar
- Succeeded by: Riding dissolved

Canadian Ambassador to the United States
- In office July 1944 – September 1946
- Prime Minister: W. L. Mackenzie King
- Preceded by: Leighton McCarthy
- Succeeded by: H. H. Wrong

Personal details
- Born: Lester Bowles Pearson; 23 April 1897 Newtonbrook, York Township, Ontario, Canada
- Died: 27 December 1972 (aged 75) Ottawa, Ontario, Canada
- Resting place: Maclaren Cemetery, Wakefield, Quebec
- Party: Liberal
- Spouse: Maryon Moody (m. 1925)
- Children: 2, including Geoffrey
- Education: University of Toronto (BA); St John's College, Oxford (BA, MA)
- Profession: Politician; diplomat; historian; scholar
- Awards: Nobel Peace Prize (1957)
- Nickname: Mike

Military service
- Allegiance: Canada
- Branch/service: Canadian Expeditionary Force; Permanent Active Militia; Royal Flying Corps
- Years of service: 1915–1919
- Rank: Lieutenant; Flying Officer
- Battles/wars: World War I

Lester Bowles Pearson (23 April 1897 – 27 December 1972) was a Canadian politician, diplomat, and scholar who served as the 14th prime minister of Canada from 1963 to 1968. He also served as leader of the Liberal Party from 1958 to 1968 and as leader of the Official Opposition from 1958 to 1963.

Born in Newtonbrook, Ontario (now part of Toronto), Pearson pursued a career in the Department of External Affairs and went on to serve as the Canadian ambassador to the United States from 1944 to 1946. He entered politics in 1948 as Secretary of State for External Affairs, serving in that position until 1957 under William Lyon Mackenzie King and Louis St. Laurent. Pearson was the seventh president of the United Nations General Assembly from 1952 to 1953. In 1953, he was a candidate to become the secretary-general of the United Nations, but was vetoed by the Soviet Union. In 1957, Pearson won the Nobel Peace Prize for proposing the United Nations Emergency Force to resolve the Suez Crisis, for which he received worldwide attention. After the Liberal Party was defeated in the 1957 federal election, Pearson won the leadership of the party the following year. He suffered two consecutive defeats by prime minister John Diefenbaker of the Progressive Conservative Party in the 1958 and 1962 federal elections. He challenged Diefenbaker for a third time in the 1963 federal election, and won a minority government. Pearson led the Liberals to a second minority government in 1965.

During Pearson's tenure as prime minister, he introduced progressive policies including the Canada Student Loan Program, the Canada Pension Plan, the Canada Assistance Plan, the Canada Labour Code, and universal health care. He established royal commissions on bilingualism and biculturalism and the status of women, oversaw the creation of the Maple Leaf flag after the Great Canadian flag debate, and unified the Canadian Armed Forces. In 1967, Pearson presided over the Canadian Centennial celebrations. In foreign policy, Pearson's government signed the Auto Pact with the United States and kept Canada out of the Vietnam War. Under his leadership, Canada became the first country in the world to implement a points-based immigration system. After five years in power, Pearson resigned as prime minister and retired from politics.

With his government programs and policies, together with his groundbreaking work at the United Nations and in international diplomacy, which included his role in ending the Suez Crisis, Pearson is considered to be among the most influential Canadians of the 20th century. He is ranked as one of Canada's greatest prime ministers.

== Early life, family, and education ==
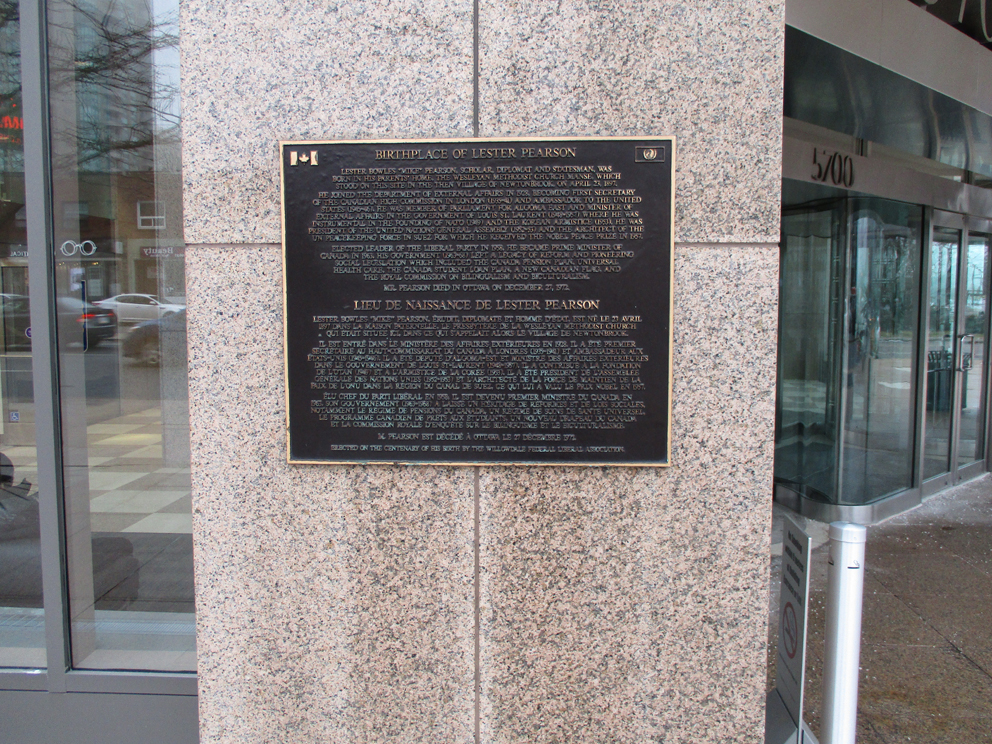
A memorial plaque on the location of his birthplace

Pearson was born in Newtonbrook (now a part of Toronto) in the township of York, Ontario, the son of Annie Sarah (née Bowles) and Edwin Arthur Pearson, a Methodist (later United Church of Canada) minister. Lester was the brother of Vaughan Whitier Pearson and Marmaduke "Duke" Pearson. Edwin Arthur was the son of Irish immigrant Marmaduke Louis Pearson and United Empire Loyalist descendant Hester Ann Marsh, while both of his maternal grandparents were children of Irish immigrants. When Pearson was one month old, his family moved to 1984 Yonge Street. Lester Pearson's father moved the young family north of Toronto to Aurora, Ontario in 1900, where he was the minister at Aurora Methodist Church on Yonge Street. Lester spent his early years in Aurora and attended the public school on Church Street. The family lived at 39 Catherine Avenue. Pearson was a member of the Aurora Rugby team. Pearson moved back to Toronto and lived at 697 Dovercourt Road from 1903 to 1907 when his father served at Centennial Methodist Church next door and attended Dewson Street Public School. From 1907 to 1910 Pearson lived in Peterborough on Water Street were he attended Central Public School until 1908 and Peterborough Collegiate Institute 1908 to 1910.

Pearson graduated from Hamilton Collegiate Institute in Hamilton, Ontario, in 1913 at the age of 16. Later that same year, he entered Victoria College at the University of Toronto, where he lived in residence in Gate House and shared a room with his brother Duke. He was later elected to the Pi Gamma Mu social sciences honour society's chapter at the University of Toronto for his outstanding scholastic performance in history and psychology. Just as Norman Jewison, E. J. Pratt, Northrop Frye and his student Margaret Atwood would, Pearson participated in the sophomore theatrical tradition of The Bob Comedy Revue. After Victoria College, Pearson won a scholarship to study at St John's College, Oxford, from 1921 to 1923.

=== Sporting interests ===
At the University of Toronto, Pearson became a noted athlete, excelling in rugby union and also playing basketball. He later also played for the Oxford University Ice Hockey Club while on a scholarship at the University of Oxford, a team that won the first Spengler Cup in 1923. Pearson also excelled in baseball and lacrosse as a youth. His baseball talents as an infielder were strong enough for a summer of semi-pro play with the Guelph Maple Leafs of the Ontario Intercounty Baseball League. Pearson toured North America with a combined Oxford and Cambridge Universities lacrosse team in 1923. After he joined the University of Toronto's History Department as an instructor, he helped to coach the U of T's football and ice hockey teams. He played golf and tennis to high standards as an adult.

== First World War ==
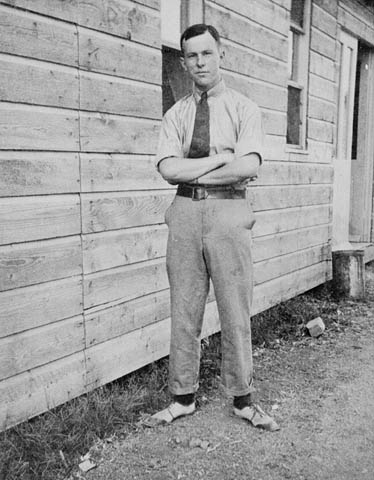
Pearson serving with the Canadian Army Medical Corps in World War I in Salonika

During World War I, Pearson volunteered for service as a medical orderly with the University of Toronto hospital unit. In 1915, he entered overseas service with the Canadian Army Medical Corps as a stretcher-bearer with the rank of private, and was subsequently promoted to corporal. During this period of service, he spent nearly two years in southern Europe, being shipped to Egypt and thereafter served on the Salonika front. He also served alongside the Serbian Army as a medical orderly. On 2 August 1917, Pearson was commissioned a temporary lieutenant. The Royal Canadian Air Force did not exist at that time, so Pearson transferred to Britain's Royal Flying Corps, where he served as a flying officer. As a pilot, he received the nickname of "Mike", given to him by a flight instructor who felt that "Lester" was too mild a name for an airman: "That’s a sissy’s name. You’re Mike," the instructor said. Thereafter, Pearson would use the name "Lester" on official documents and in public life, but was always addressed as Mike by friends and family.

Pearson learned to fly at an air training school in Hendon, England. He survived an airplane crash during his first flight. In 1918, Pearson was hit by a bus in London during a citywide blackout and was sent home to recuperate, being demobilised on 11 April 1919.

== Inter-war years ==
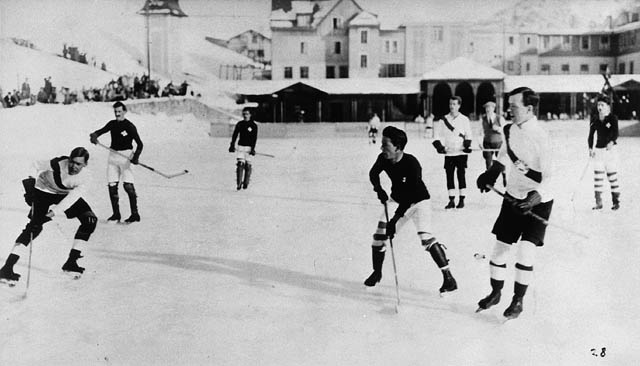
Ice hockey in Europe; Oxford University vs. Switzerland, 1922. Future Canadian prime minister Lester Pearson is at right front. His nickname from the Swiss was "Herr Zig-Zag".

After the war, he returned to school, receiving his Bachelor of Arts degree (BA) from the University of Toronto in 1919. He was able to complete his degree after one more term, under a ruling in force at the time, since he had served in the military during the war. He and his brother Duke then spent a year working in Hamilton, Ontario, and in Chicago, in the meat-packing industry at Armour and Company, which he did not enjoy (whose president at the time, Frank Edson White, was his uncle through marriage to Lillian Sophia Pearson White).),

=== Oxford ===
Upon receiving a scholarship from the Massey Foundation, he studied for two years at St John's College at the University of Oxford, where he received a BA degree with second-class honours in modern history in 1923, and the M.A. in 1925. After Oxford, he returned to Canada and taught history at the University of Toronto.

=== Marriage, family ===
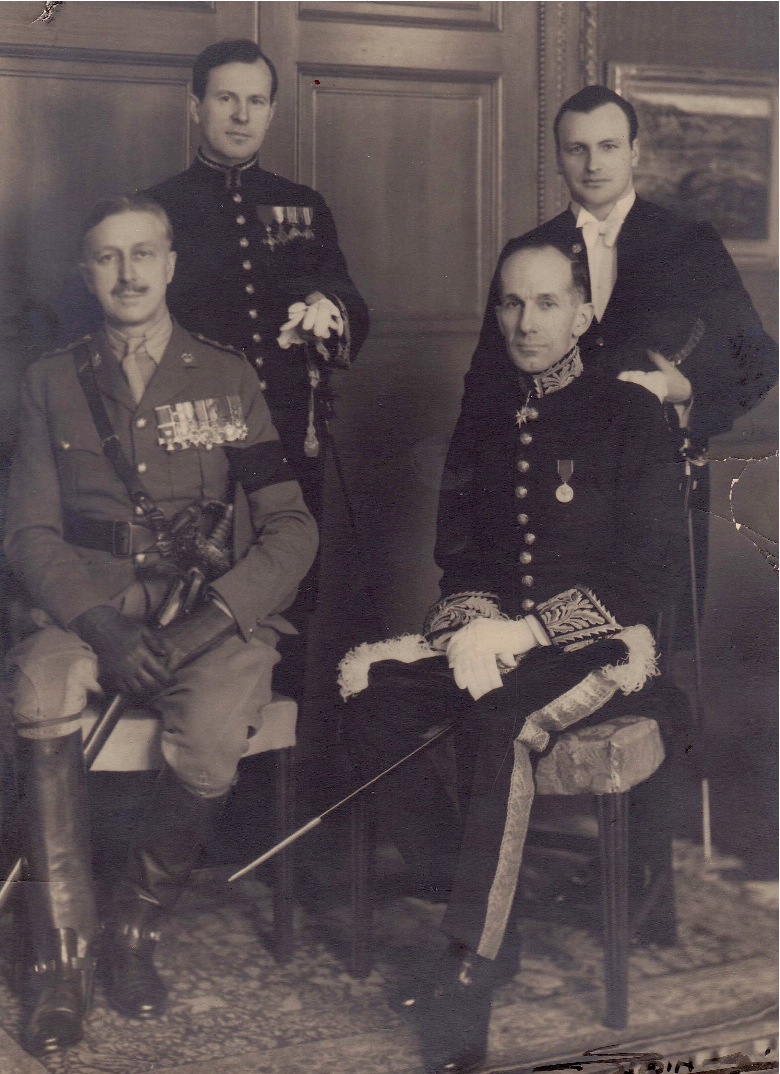
Pearson with John Ross McLean, Vincent Massey and Georges Vanier on 1 January 1938 at Canada House, London

In 1925, he married Maryon Moody, from Winnipeg, who had been one of his students at the University of Toronto. Together, they had one son, Geoffrey, and one daughter, Patricia. Maryon was confident and outspoken, supporting her husband in all his political endeavours.

=== Diplomat, public servant ===
In 1927, after scoring top marks on the Canadian foreign service entry exam, he then embarked on a career in the Department of External Affairs. Prime minister R. B. Bennett was a noted talent spotter. He took note of, and encouraged, the young Pearson in the early 1930s, and appointed Pearson to significant roles on two major government inquiries: the 1931 Royal Commission on Grain Futures, and the 1934 Royal Commission on Price Spreads. Bennett saw that Pearson was recognized with an OBE after he shone in that work, arranged a bonus of CA$1,800, and invited him to a London conference. Pearson was assigned to the High Commission of Canada in the United Kingdom in 1935.

== World War II and aftermath ==
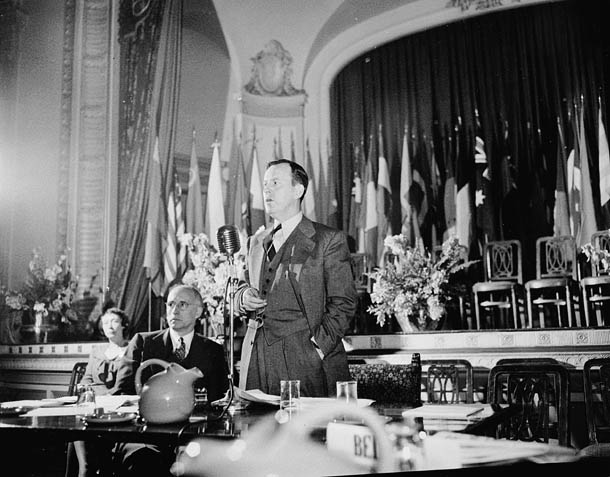
Pearson presiding at a plenary session of the founding conference of the United Nations Food and Agriculture Organization in 1945.

Pearson continued to serve at Canada House during World War II from 1939 through 1942 as the second-in-command, where he coordinated military supply and refugee problems, serving under high commissioner Vincent Massey.

Pearson returned to Ottawa for a few months, where he was an assistant under secretary from 1941 through 1942. In June 1942 he was posted to the Canadian embassy in Washington, D.C., as a ministerial counsellor. He served as second-in-command for nearly two years. Promoted minister plenipotentiary in 1944, he became the second Canadian ambassador to the United States on 1 January 1945. He remained in this position through September 1946.

Pearson had an important part in founding both the United Nations and the North Atlantic Treaty Organization (NATO).

Pearson nearly became the first secretary-general of the United Nations in 1946, but was vetoed by the Soviet Union. He was also the leading candidate for secretary-general in the 1953 selection of the Seventh session of the United Nations General Assembly, when the British conducted a vigorous campaign on his behalf. He placed first with 10 out of 11 votes in the Security Council, but the lone negative vote was another Soviet veto. The Security Council instead settled on Dag Hammarskjöld of Sweden; all UN secretaries-general would come from neutral countries for the rest of the Cold War.

The Canadian prime minister, Mackenzie King, tried to recruit Pearson into his government as the war wound down. Pearson felt honoured by King's approach, but resisted due to his personal dislike of King's poor personal style and political methods. Pearson did not make the move into politics until a few years later, after King had announced his retirement as prime minister.

== Secretary of State for External Affairs (1948–1957) ==
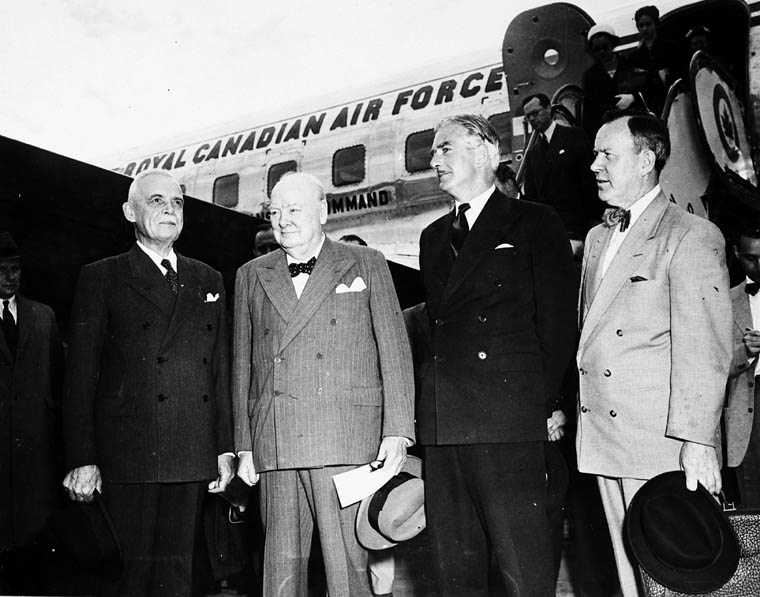
Prime minister Louis St. Laurent (far left) and Pearson (far right) welcome UK prime minister Sir Winston Churchill and foreign secretary Sir Anthony Eden at Rockcliffe Airport, Ottawa, on 29 June 1954.

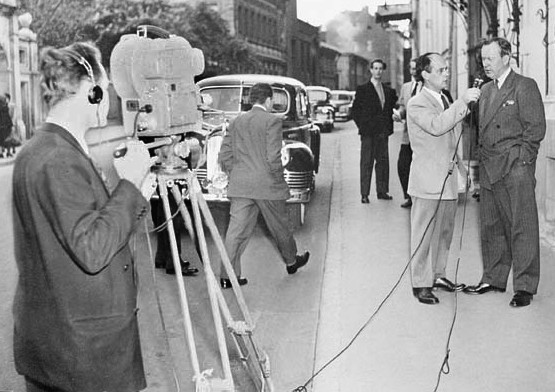
René Levesque interviews Pearson in Moscow, 1955

In 1948, before his retirement, prime minister King appointed Pearson Secretary of State for External Affairs in the Liberal government. Shortly afterward, Pearson won a seat in the House of Commons, for the federal riding of Algoma East in Northern Ontario. Pearson then served as Secretary of State for External Affairs for prime minister Louis St. Laurent, until the defeat of the St. Laurent government in 1957.

=== Vetoed by the Soviet Union ===
On 10 November 1952, Trygve Lie announced his resignation as secretary-general of the United Nations. Several months of negotiations ensued between the Western powers and the Soviet Union without reaching an agreement on his successor. On 13 and 19 March 1953, the Security Council voted on four candidates. This came one week after Stalin's death but before Khrushchev's rise to power. Pearson was the only candidate to receive the required majority, but he was vetoed by the Soviet Union.

=== Role in Suez crisis leads to Nobel Peace Prize ===
In 1957, for his role in resolving the Suez Crisis through the United Nations one year earlier, Pearson was awarded the Nobel Peace Prize. The selection committee argued that Pearson had "saved the world", but critics accused him of betraying the motherland and Canada's ties with the UK. Pearson and UN secretary-general Dag Hammarskjöld are considered the fathers of the modern concept of peacekeeping. Together, they organized the United Nations Emergency Force by way of a five-day fly-around in early November 1956 after the First emergency special session of the United Nations General Assembly. His Nobel medal was on permanent display in the front lobby of the Lester B. Pearson Building, the headquarters of Global Affairs Canada in Ottawa until 2017 when the medal was loaned to the Canadian Museum of History, to be displayed in the 'Canadian History Hall'.

== Opposition leader (1958–1963) ==
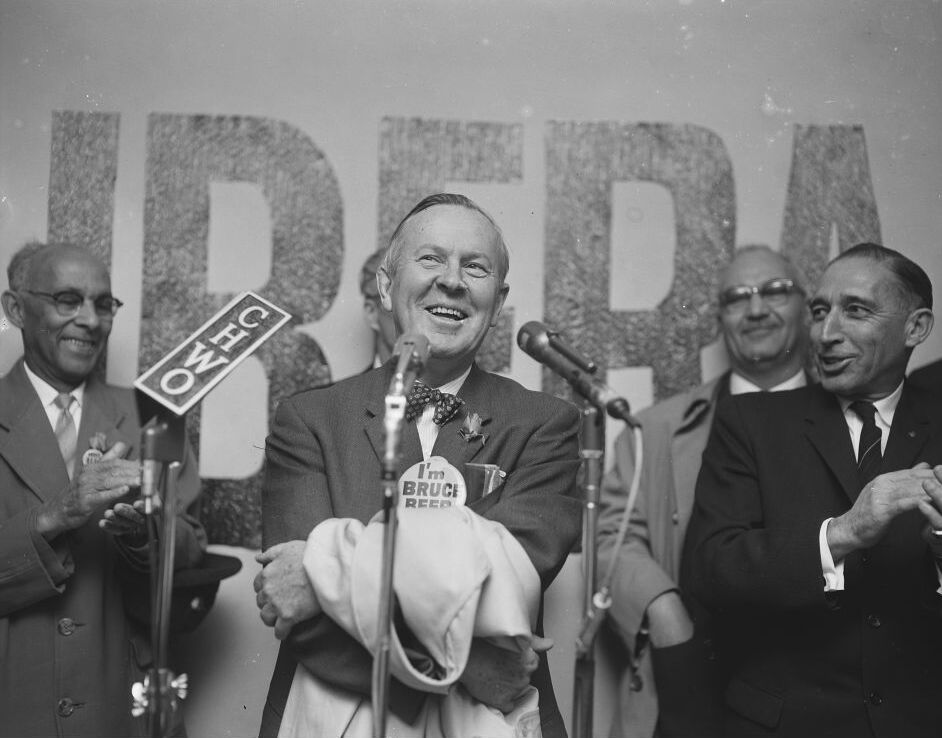
Pearson campaigning for Bruce Beer in Peel during the 1962 Federal election

St. Laurent was defeated by the Progressive Conservatives under John Diefenbaker in the election of 1957. After just a few months as Leader of the Opposition, St. Laurent retired, and he endorsed Pearson as his successor. Pearson was elected leader of the Liberal Party at its leadership convention of 1958, defeating his chief rival, former cabinet minister Paul Martin Sr.

At his first parliamentary session as opposition leader, Pearson asked Diefenbaker to give power back to the Liberals without an election, because of a recent economic downturn. This strategy backfired when Diefenbaker showed a classified Liberal document saying that the economy would face a downturn in that year. This contrasted heavily with the Liberal campaign promises of 1957.

Consequently, Pearson's party was routed in the federal election of 1958. Diefenbaker's Conservatives won the largest majority ever seen in Canada to that point (208 of 265 seats). The Liberals lost over half their seats and were cut down to only 48 seats, the fewest in their history at the time. Furthermore, the election cost the Liberals their stronghold in Quebec. This province had voted largely Liberal in federal elections since the Conscription Crisis of 1917, but Quebec had no favourite son leader, as it had had since 1948.

Pearson convened a significant "Thinkers' Conference" at Kingston, Ontario in 1960. This event developed many of the ideas later implemented when he became the prime minister.

In the federal election of 1962, the Liberals, led by Pearson, recovered much of what they had lost in their severe defeat four years earlier. Liberal gains and the surprise election of 30 Social Credit MPs deprived the Tories of their majority. As a consequence, Diefenbaker now had to preside over a minority government.

Not long after the election, Pearson capitalized on the Conservatives' indecision on accepting American nuclear warheads on Canadian BOMARC missiles. Defence minister Douglas Harkness resigned from Cabinet on 4 February 1963, because of Diefenbaker's opposition to accepting the warheads. On the next day, the government lost two non-confidence motions on the issue, forcing a national election for a House only a year old. The Liberals raced out to a large lead in opinion polling, and for a time the only question was how large Pearson's majority would be. However, Pearson was forced off the hustings for a time due to ill health. Additionally, when the United States Department of Defense leaked documents detailing the proposed missile defences, the Tories claimed a Liberal government would let Canada be a decoy in the event of a nuclear exchange with the Soviets.

By election day, the Liberals had recovered their momentum and took 129 seats to the Tories' 95. The Liberals won 41 percent of the vote, normally enough for a majority. However, their gains were heavily concentrated in Ontario, Quebec and the Atlantic. Winning only three seats in the Prairies, they were five short of a majority. After six Social Credit MPs from Quebec announced their support for the Liberals, Pearson was able to guarantee stable government to the governor general. Rather than face certain defeat in the Commons, Diefenbaker resigned, allowing Pearson to form a minority government. He was sworn in as prime minister on 22 April, a day before his 66th birthday. While the créditistes repudiated this statement days later, Pearson was able to stay in office with the support of the New Democratic Party.

== Prime minister (1963–1968) ==
Ternary plots of election results during Pearson premiership
1963

1965
Electoral districts identified by colours of winning parties

=== Domestic policy and events ===
Pearson campaigned during the 1963 election promising "60 Days of Decision" and supported the Bomarc surface-to-air missile program. Pearson never had a majority in the House of Commons, but he brought in many of Canada's major updated social programs, including universal health care (though that credit should be shared with Tommy Douglas, who as premier of Saskatchewan had introduced the country's first medicare system), the Canada Pension Plan, and Canada Student Loans. Pearson instituted a new national flag, the Maple Leaf flag, after a national debate known as the Great Canadian flag debate. He also instituted the 40-hour work week, two weeks vacation time, and a new minimum wage for workers in federally-regulated areas.

In hopes of winning an outright majority, Pearson called an election for November 1965, three years before it was due. Ultimately, the Liberals were only able to pick up three more seats, leaving them two short of a majority. As in 1963, the Liberals were almost nonexistent in the Prairies, winning only one seat there, that of Veterans Affairs minister Roger Teillet.

Pearson also started a number of royal commissions, including the Royal Commission on the Status of Women and the Royal Commission on Bilingualism and Biculturalism. These suggested changes that helped create legal equality for women and brought official bilingualism into being. After Pearson's term in office, French was made an official language, and the Canadian government provided services in both English and French. Pearson hoped to be the last unilingual prime minister of Canada, and fluency in both English and French became an unofficial requirement for candidates for prime minister after Pearson left office.

In 1966, the Canada Assistance Plan was introduced, under which the federal government supported provincial social assistance costs (including half the cost of various health services for those in need such as eyeglasses, dental services, and prescription drugs) and (as noted by one study) “required the provinces to provide assistance to those in need.”

In 1967, Pearson's government introduced a discrimination-free points-based system which encouraged immigration to Canada, the first country to do so.

Pearson oversaw Canada's centennial celebrations in 1967 before retiring. The Canadian news agency, The Canadian Press, named him "Newsmaker of the Year", citing his leadership during the centennial celebrations, which brought the Centennial Flame to Parliament Hill.

Several other reforms were carried out during Pearson's time as prime minister, affecting areas such as social security, housing, and agriculture

=== Foreign policy ===
Pearson, and three of his cabinet ministers who later became prime ministers. From left to right, Pierre Trudeau, John Turner, Jean Chrétien, and Pearson.

On 15 January 1964, Pearson became the first Canadian prime minister to make an official state visit to France.

In 1967, French president Charles de Gaulle made a visit to Quebec. A staunch advocate of Quebec separatism, de Gaulle went so far as to say that his procession in Montreal reminded him of his return to Paris after it was freed from the Nazis during the Second World War. President de Gaulle also gave his "Vive le Québec libre" speech during the visit. Given Canada's efforts in aiding France during both world wars, Pearson was enraged. He rebuked de Gaulle in a speech the following day, remarking that "Canadians do not need to be liberated", and made it clear that de Gaulle was no longer welcome in Canada.

Pearson signed the Canada–United States Automotive Agreement (or Auto Pact) in January 1965, and unemployment fell to its lowest rate in over a decade.

While in office, Pearson declined U.S. requests to send Canadian combat troops into the Vietnam War. Pearson spoke at Temple University in Philadelphia on 2 April 1965 and voiced his support for a pause in the American bombing of North Vietnam, so that a diplomatic solution to the crisis might unfold. To president Lyndon B. Johnson, this criticism of American foreign policy on American soil was intolerable. Before Pearson had finished his speech, he was invited to Camp David, Maryland, to meet with Johnson the next day. Johnson, who was notorious for his personal touch in politics, reportedly grabbed Pearson by the lapels and shouted, "You pissed on my rug!" Text of his Philadelphia speech, however, showed that Pearson in fact supported president Johnson's policy in Vietnam, even stating "The government and great majority of people of my country have supported wholeheartedly the US peacekeeping and peacemaking policies in Vietnam."

After this incident, Johnson and Pearson did have further contacts, including two more meetings together, both times in Canada. Canada's exported raw materials and resources helped fuel and sustain American efforts in the Vietnam War.

=== Military ===
Pearson's government endured significant controversy in Canada's military services throughout the mid-1960s, following the tabling of the White Paper on Defence in March 1964. This document laid out a plan to merge the Royal Canadian Navy, the Royal Canadian Air Force, and the Canadian Army to form a single service called the Canadian Forces. Military unification took effect on 1 February 1968, when The Canadian Forces Reorganization Act received royal assent.

=== Supreme Court appointments ===
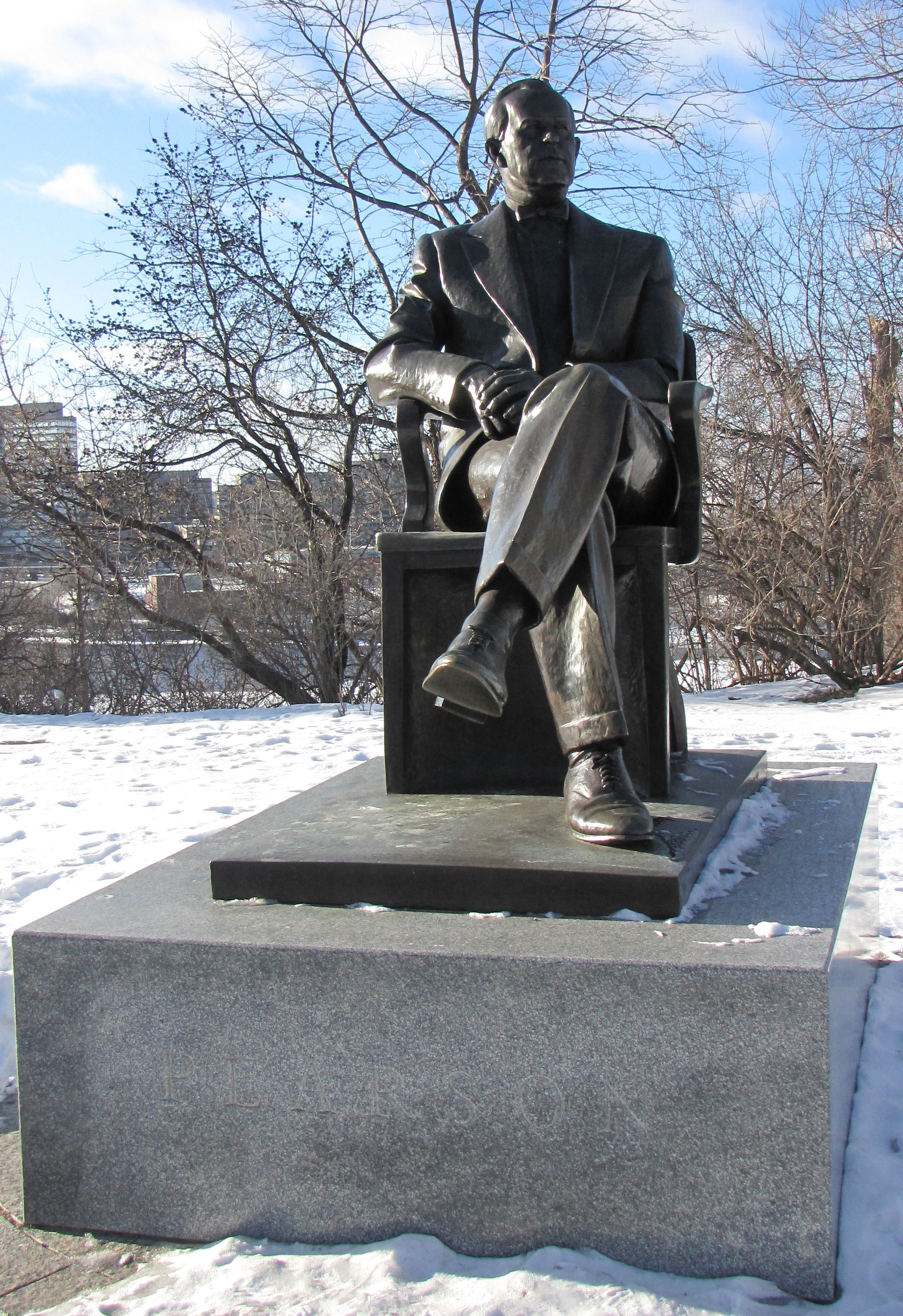
Statue on Parliament Hill grounds

Pearson chose the following jurists to be appointed as justices of the Supreme Court of Canada by the governor general:

- Robert Taschereau (as chief justice, 22 April 1963 – 1 September 1967; appointed a puisne justice under prime minister King, 9 February 1940)
- Wishart Flett Spence (30 May 1963 – 29 December 1978)
- John Robert Cartwright (as chief justice, 1 September 1967 – 23 March 1970; appointed a puisne justice under prime minister St. Laurent, 22 December 1949)
- Louis-Philippe Pigeon (21 September 1967 – 8 February 1980)

=== Retirement ===
After his 14 December 1967 announcement that he was retiring from politics, a leadership convention was held. Pearson's successor was Pierre Trudeau, whom Pearson had recruited and made justice minister in his cabinet. Two other cabinet ministers Pearson had recruited, John Turner and Jean Chrétien, served as prime ministers following Trudeau's retirement.

== After politics ==
From 1968 to 1969, Pearson served as chairman of the Pearson Commission on International Development, which was sponsored by the World Bank. Following his retirement, he lectured at Carleton University in Ottawa while writing his memoirs. From 1970 to 1972, he was the first chairman of the board of governors of the International Development Research Centre. From 1969 until his death in 1972, he was chancellor of Carleton University.

Pearson had planned to write a three-volume set of memoirs with the title "Mike: The Memoirs of the Rt. Hon. Lester B. Pearson". The first volume was published in 1972. The other two volumes were published posthumously in 1973 and 1975, but are tainted with the biases of their ghostwriters.

=== Illness and death ===
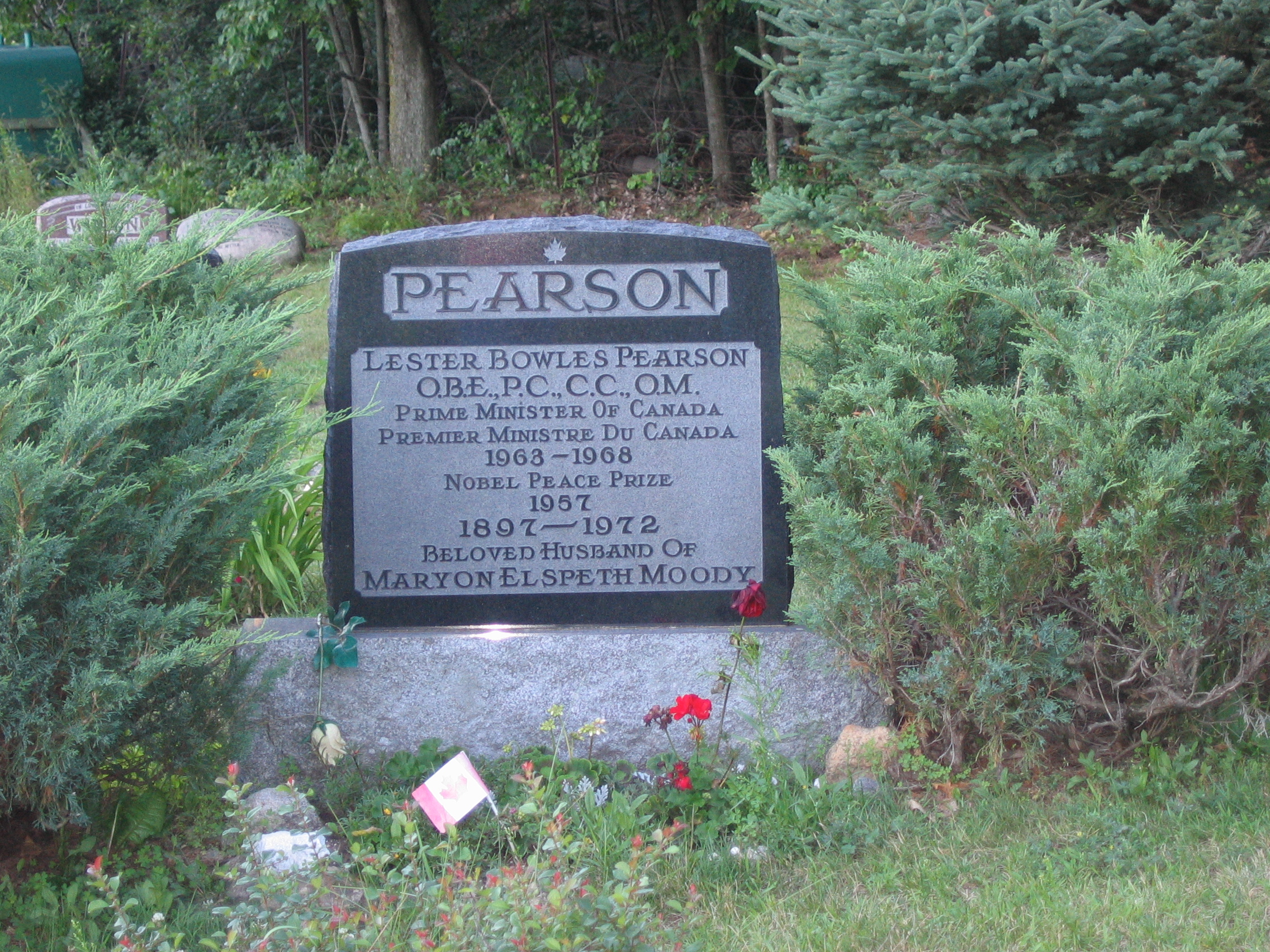
Pearson's gravestone in Wakefield, Quebec

In 1970, Pearson underwent surgery to have his right eye removed to remove a tumour in that area.

In November 1972, it was reported that he was admitted to the hospital for further unspecified treatment, but the prognosis was poor. He tried to write at this juncture the story of his prime ministerial career, but his condition, which was already precarious, deteriorated rapidly by Christmas Eve.

On 27 December 1972, it was announced that the cancer had spread to the liver and Pearson had lapsed into a coma. He died at 11:40 pm ET on 27 December 1972 in his Ottawa home.

Pearson is buried at Maclaren Cemetery in Wakefield, Quebec, next to his close External Affairs colleagues H. H. Wrong and Norman Robertson.

== Honours and awards ==
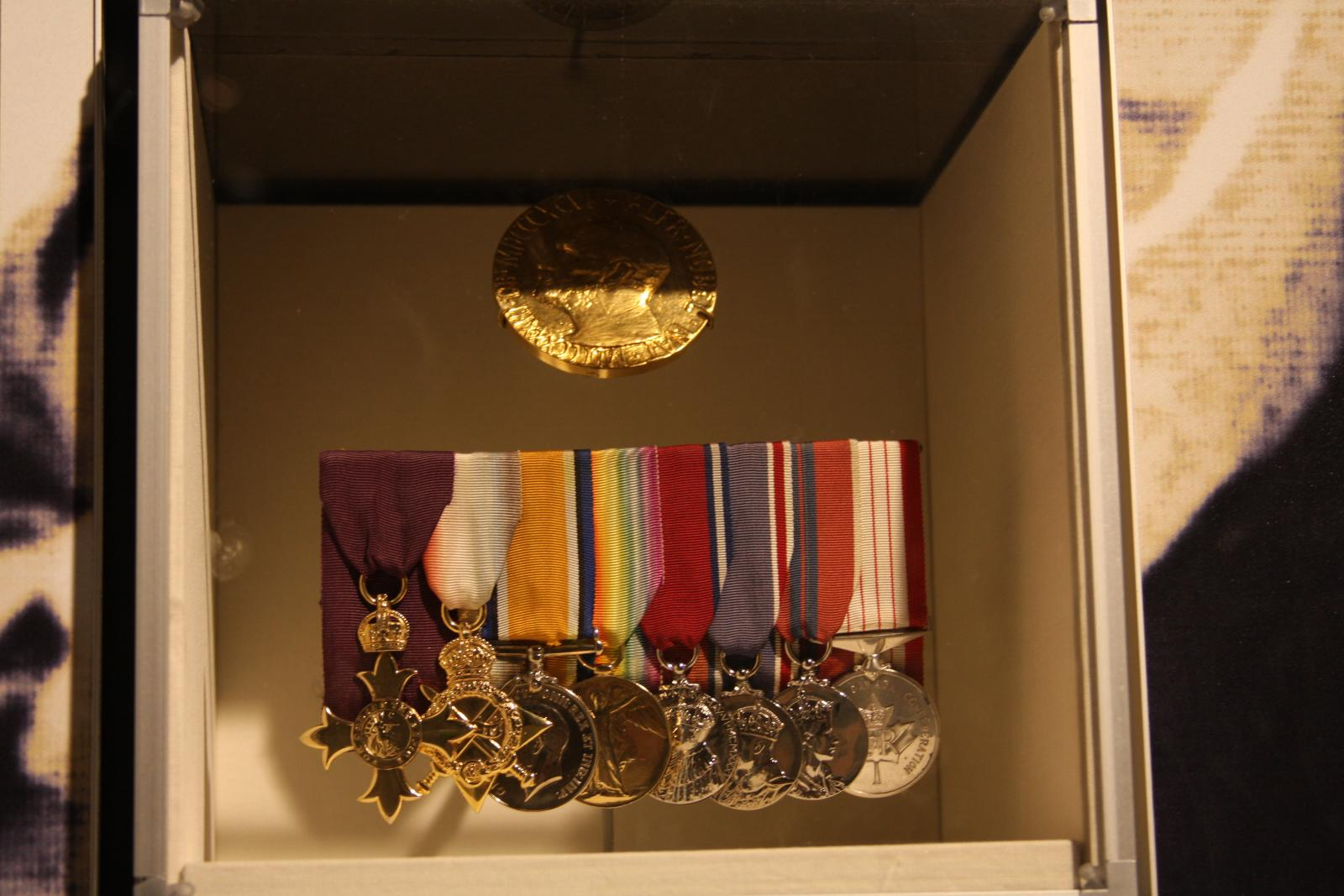
Pearson's medals

Ribbon	Description	Notes
	Order of Merit (OM)	Awarded on 28 May 1971
	Companion of the Order of Canada (CC)	Awarded on 28 June 1968.
	Officer of the Most Excellent Order of the British Empire (OBE)	During the brief revival of Imperial Honours during the premiership of the Right Honourable Richard Bedford Bennett between 1931 and 1935.
	1914–15 Star	As a member of the Canadian Armed Forces
	British War Medal	As a member of the Canadian Armed Forces
	Victory Medal (United Kingdom)	As a member of the Canadian Armed Forces
	Queen Elizabeth II Coronation Medal	1953; As a member of the Queen's Privy Council for Canada and an elected Member of the House of Commons of Canada, the then Honourable Lester B. Pearson, P.C., O.B.E., M.P., would be awarded the medal as a member of the Canadian order of precedence.
	Centennial Anniversary of the Confederation of Canada Medal	1967; As the Prime Minister of Canada and an elected Member of the House of Commons of Canada, the Right Honourable Lester B. Pearson would be awarded the medal as a member of the Canadian order of precedence.

- Elected a Foreign Honorary Member of the American Academy of Arts and Sciences in 1957.
- The Canadian Press named Pearson "Newsmaker of the Year" nine times, a record he held until his successor, Pierre Trudeau, surpassed it in 2000. He was also only one of two prime ministers to have received the honour both before and when prime minister (the other being Brian Mulroney).
- Pearson was inducted into the Canadian Peace Hall of Fame in 2000.
- The Pearson Medal of Peace, first awarded in 1979, is an award given out annually by the United Nations Association in Canada to recognize an individual Canadian's "contribution to international service".
- A plaque, placed by the Ontario Heritage Trust, is on the grounds of Newtonbrook United Church, the successor congregation to the one that owned the manse.
- In a survey by Canadian historians of the first 20 prime ministers through Jean Chrétien, Pearson ranked No. 6.
- In a 2003 survey by Canadian historians of the Canadian prime ministers who served after World War II, Pearson was ranked first "by a landslide".

=== Order of Canada Citation ===
Pearson was appointed a Companion of the Order of Canada on 28 June 1968. His citation reads:

"Former Prime Minister of Canada. For his services to Canada at home and abroad."

=== Educational and academic institutions ===
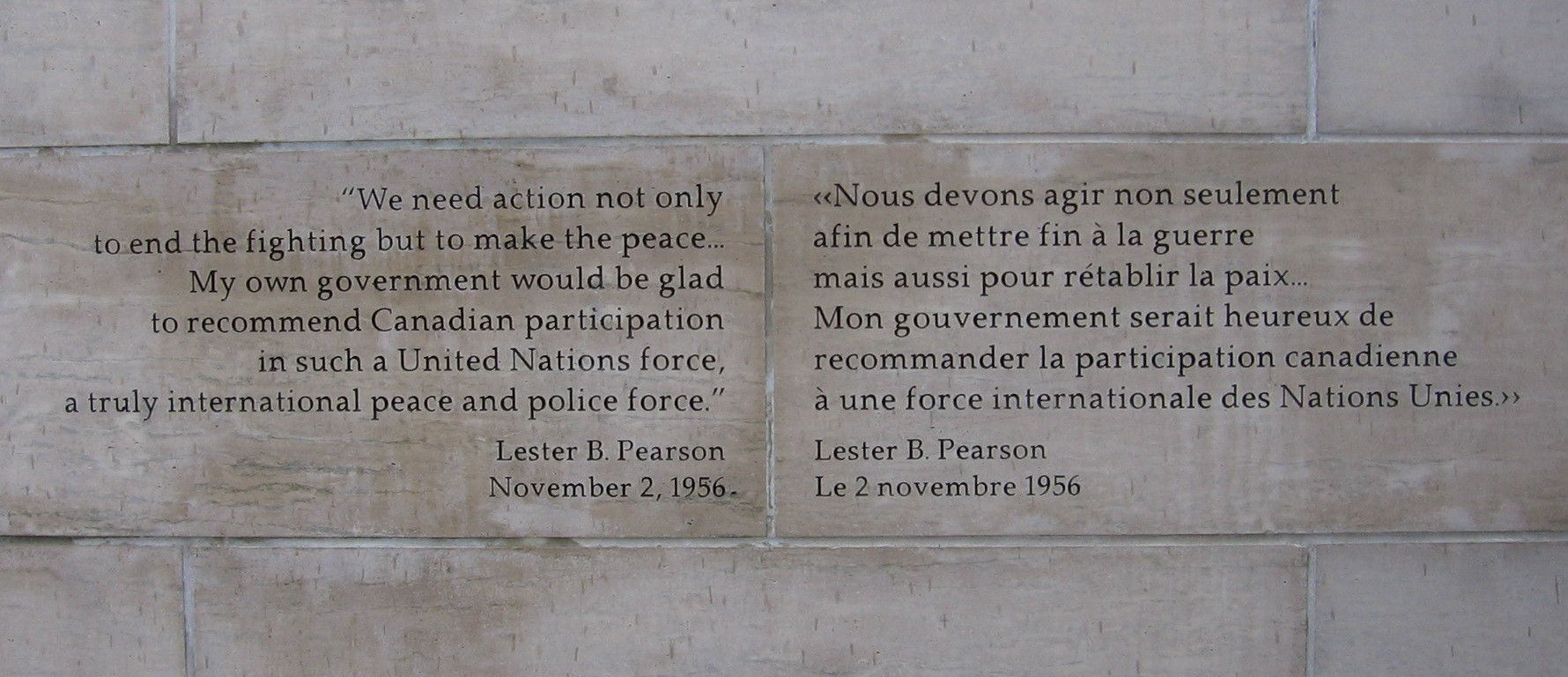
Lester B. Pearson quote on the Peacekeeping Monument

- The Lester B. Pearson United World College, opened in 1974 as the second United World College, near Victoria, British Columbia.
- The Pearson Peacekeeping Centre, established in 1994, is an independent not-for-profit institution providing research and training on all aspects of peace operations.
- The Lester B. Pearson School Board is the largest English-language school board in Quebec. The majority of the schools of the Lester B. Pearson School Board are located on the western half of the island of Montreal, while a few of its schools located off the island.
- Lester B. Pearson High School lists five so-named schools, in Burlington, Calgary, Montreal, Ottawa, and Toronto.
- There are Lester B. Pearson elementary schools in Ajax, Ontario; Aurora, Ontario; Brampton, Ontario; London, Ontario; Saskatoon, Saskatchewan; Waterloo, Ontario and Wesleyville, Newfoundland.
- Mike's Place, the Graduate Student Pub at Carleton University was named in 1973 in honour of Lester B. Pearson with permission of his estate.
- The Lester B. Pearson International Student Scholarship is the most prestigious scholarship for international students at the University of Toronto. It covers the tuition, books, incidental fees, and full residence support.

=== Civic and civil infrastructure ===
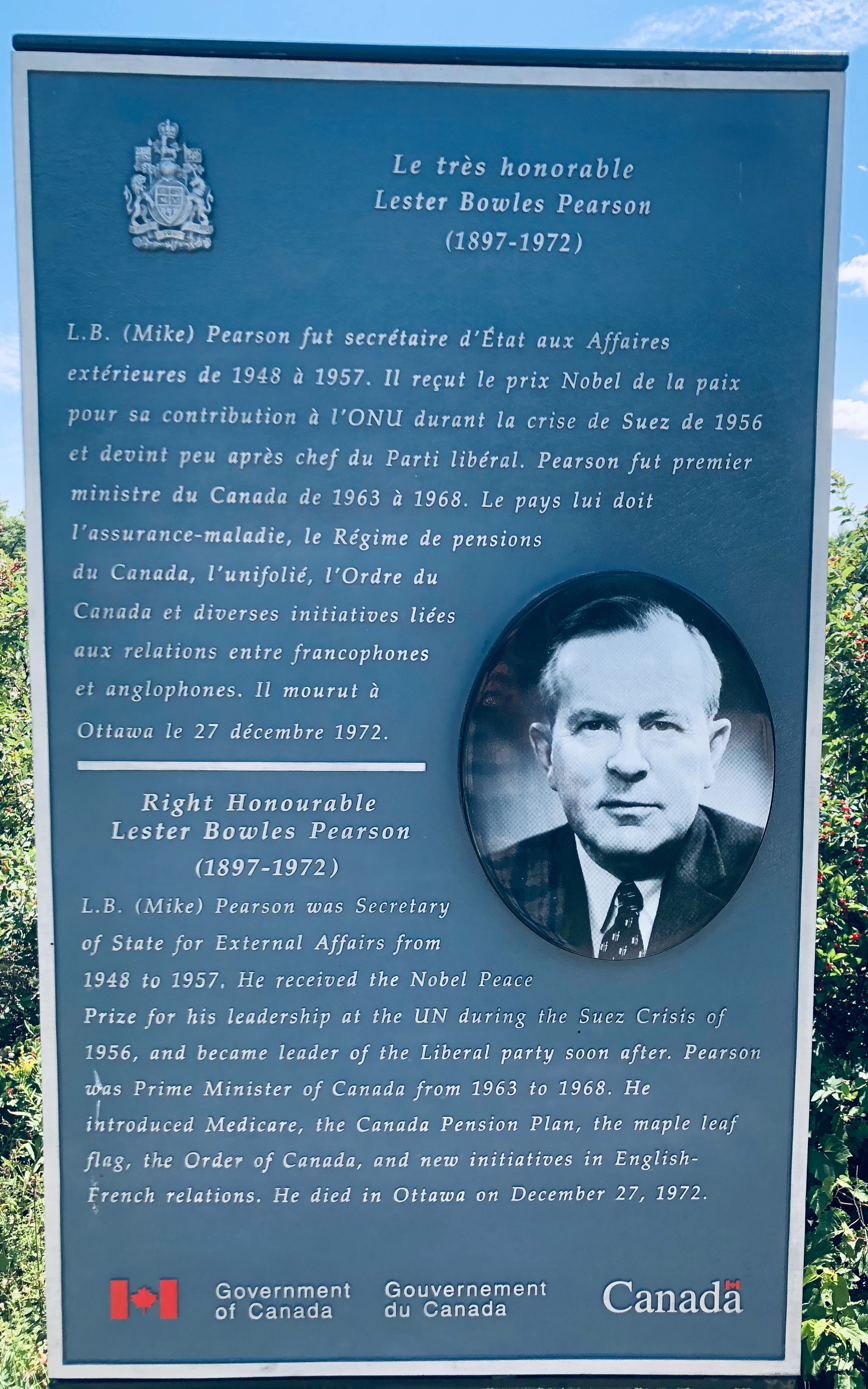
Tribute plaque to Lester Bowles Pearson

- Toronto Pearson International Airport, first opened in 1939 and renamed with its current name in 1984, is Canada's busiest airport.
- The Lester B. Pearson Building, completed in 1973, is the headquarters for the Department of Foreign Affairs and International Trade, a tribute to his service as external affairs minister.
- Lester B. Pearson Civic Centre in Elliot Lake, Ontario was heavily damaged in February 2019.
- Lester B. Pearson Garden for Peace and Understanding, E.J. Pratt Library in the University of Toronto, completed in 2004
- Lester B. Pearson Place, completed in 2006, is a four-storey affordable housing building in Newtonbrook, Toronto, near his place of birth, and adjacent to Newtonbrook United Church.
- Lester B. Pearson Park in St. Catharines, Ontario.
- Pearson Avenue is located near Highway 407 and Yonge Street in Richmond Hill, Ontario, Canada; less than five miles from his place of birth.
- Pearson Way is an arterial access road located in a new subdivision in Milton, Ontario; many ex-prime ministers are being honoured in this growing community, including prime ministers Pierre Trudeau and Wilfrid Laurier.
- Pearson Plaza, a mall being developed in Elliot Lake to replace the Algo Centre Mall.
- Pearson Park, a playground built in 2013 in Wesleyville, Newfoundland.

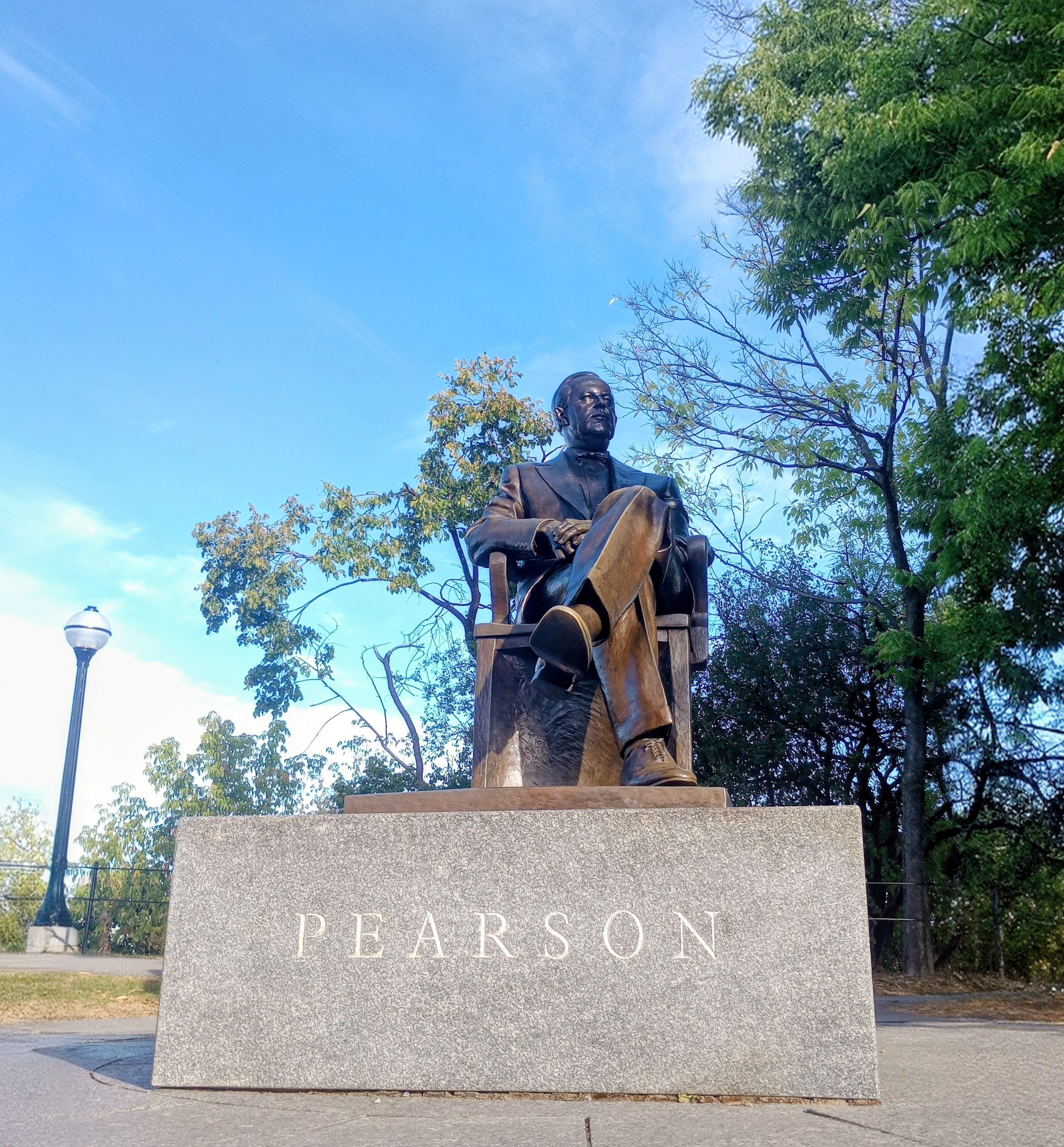
Statue of Pearson on Parliament Hill

=== Sports ===
- The award for the best National Hockey League player as voted by members of the National Hockey League Players' Association (NHLPA) was known as the Lester B. Pearson Award from its inception in 1971 to 2010, when its name was changed to the Ted Lindsay Award to honour one of the union's pioneers.
- Pearson was inducted into the Sports Hall of Fame at the University of Toronto in 1987.
- Pearson was inducted into the Canadian Baseball Hall of Fame in 1983.
- The Pearson Cup was a baseball competition between the Toronto Blue Jays and Montreal Expos. Pearson also served as Expo's Honorary Club President from 1969 to 1972.

=== Honorary degrees ===
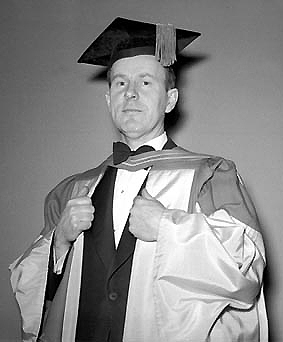
Lester B. Pearson, Canadian Ambassador to the United States, at University of Toronto convocation, 1945

Honorary Degrees

Location	Date	School	Degree
Ontario	1945	University of Toronto	Doctor of Laws (LL.D)
New York	1947	University of Rochester	Doctor of Laws (LL.D)
Ontario	May 1948	McMaster University	Doctor of Laws (LL.D)
Maine	1 June 1951	Bates College	Doctor of Laws (LL.D)
Massachusetts	1953	Harvard University	Doctor of Laws (LL.D)
New Jersey	1956	Princeton University	Doctor of Laws (LL.D)
British Columbia	25 September 1958	University of British Columbia	Doctor of Laws (LL.D)
Indiana	9 June 1963	University of Notre Dame	Doctor of Laws (LL.D)
Ontario	29 May 1964	University of Western Ontario	Doctor of Laws (LL.D)
Newfoundland and Labrador	September 1964	Memorial University of Newfoundland	Doctor of Laws (LL.D)
Ontario	December 1964	Waterloo Lutheran University	Doctor of Laws (LL.D)
Maryland	1964	Johns Hopkins University	Doctor of Laws (LL.D)
Ontario	1965	Laurentian University	Doctor of Laws (LL.D)
Saskatchewan	17 May 1965	University of Saskatchewan (Regina Campus)	Doctor of Civil Law (DCL)
Quebec	28 May 1965	McGill University	Doctor of Laws (LL.D)
Ontario	1965	Queen's University	Doctor of Laws (LL.D)
Nova Scotia	1967	Dalhousie University	Doctor of Laws (LL.D)
Alberta	29 March 1967	University of Calgary	
Prince Edward Island	1967	Prince of Wales College	
California	1967	University of California, Santa Barbara	
Ontario	1967	University of Ottawa	Doctor of Political Science
Ontario	22 May 1971	Royal Military College of Canada	Doctor of Laws (LL.D)
New York		Columbia University	
England		University of Oxford	Doctor of Civil Law (DCL)

==== Freedom of the City ====
- 1967: London

== Bibliography ==
Archives

Lester B. Pearson fonds at Library and Archives Canada

Works by Pearson

Pearson published one memoir in his lifetime. The other two were written after his death by ghostwriters and they lack authenticity.

- Pearson, Lester B. (1972). Mike: The Memoirs of the Rt. Hon. Lester B. Pearson. Vol. 1. University of Toronto Press.
- Pearson, Lester B.; Munro, John A.; Inglis, Alexander I. (1973). Mike: The Memoirs of the Rt. Hon. Lester B. Pearson: 1948–1957. Vol. 2. University of Toronto Press.
- Mike: The Memoirs of the Rt. Hon. Lester B. Pearson: 1957–1968 vol 3

Works about Pearson

- Bothwell, R. Pearson (1978)
- Canadian Encyclopedia. "Lester B. Pearson" (2015)online
- English, John. Shadow of heaven : the life of Lester Pearson: Volume 1 1897–1948 (1990) online free
- John English (2011). The Worldly Years: vol. 2: Life of Lester Pearson 1949–1972. Random House Digital, Inc. ISBN 978-0-307-37539-1.
- Ferguson, Will (1999). Bastards and Boneheads: Canada's Glorious Leaders, Past and Present. Vancouver: Douglas & McIntyre. ISBN 978-1-55054-737-5. OCLC 44883908.
- Pearson, Lester B; Fry, Michael G (1975). "Freedom and change" : essays in honour of Lester B. Pearson. Toronto: McClelland & Stewart. ISBN 978-0-7710-3187-8. OCLC 2692327. Also OCLC 463535217 and OCLC 300360332 online free.
- Hillmer, Norman; Granatstein, J L (1999). Prime ministers: ranking Canada's leaders. Toronto: HarperCollins. ISBN 978-0-00-200027-7. OCLC 41432030. Also ISBN 978-0-00-638563-9.
- Hutchison, Bruce (1964). Mr. Prime Minister 1867–1964. Don Mills, Ont: Longmans Canada. OCLC 5024890. Also OCLC 422290909.
- Lester Pearson's Peacekeeping: The Truth May Hurt by Yves Engler Publication Date: Feb 2012 Pages: 160
- Pearson, Geoffrey A.H. (1993). Seize the Day: Lester B. Pearson and Crisis Diplomacy. Ottawa: Carleton University Press. ISBN 9780773573840.

== See also ==
- Canada and the United Nations
- Canada and the Vietnam War
- Great Canadian Flag Debate – Debate in Canada from 1963 to 1964 over the design of a new national flag
- Landon Pearson – Canadian politician, author, and children's rights advocate (1930–2023)
- List of prime ministers of Canada

19th Canadian Ministry (1963–1968) – Cabinet of Lester B. Pearson
Cabinet post (1)
Predecessor	Office	Successor
John Diefenbaker	Prime Minister of Canada; 1963–1968	Pierre Trudeau
Diplomatic posts
Preceded by Leighton McCarthy	Canadian Ambassador to the United States of America; 1944–1946	Succeeded by H. H. Wrong
Preceded by Luis Padilla Nervo	President of the United Nations General Assembly; 1952–1953	Succeeded by Vijaya Lakshmi Pandit
Political offices
Preceded by Louis St. Laurent	Secretary of State for External Affairs; 1948–1957	Succeeded by John Diefenbaker
Preceded by Louis St. Laurent	Leader of the Opposition; 1957–1963	Succeeded by John Diefenbaker
Preceded by Thomas Farquhar	Member for Algoma East; 1948–1968	Succeeded by none (riding merged into Algoma)
Party political offices
Preceded by Louis St. Laurent	Leader of the Liberal Party; 1958–1968	Succeeded by Pierre Trudeau
Academic offices
Preceded by Jack Mackenzie	Chancellor of Carleton University; 1969–1972	Succeeded by Gerhard Herzberg
