= Seventh session of the United Nations General Assembly =

UN General Assembly session

- 14 October 1952 – 14 September 1953 7th session 7th general debate
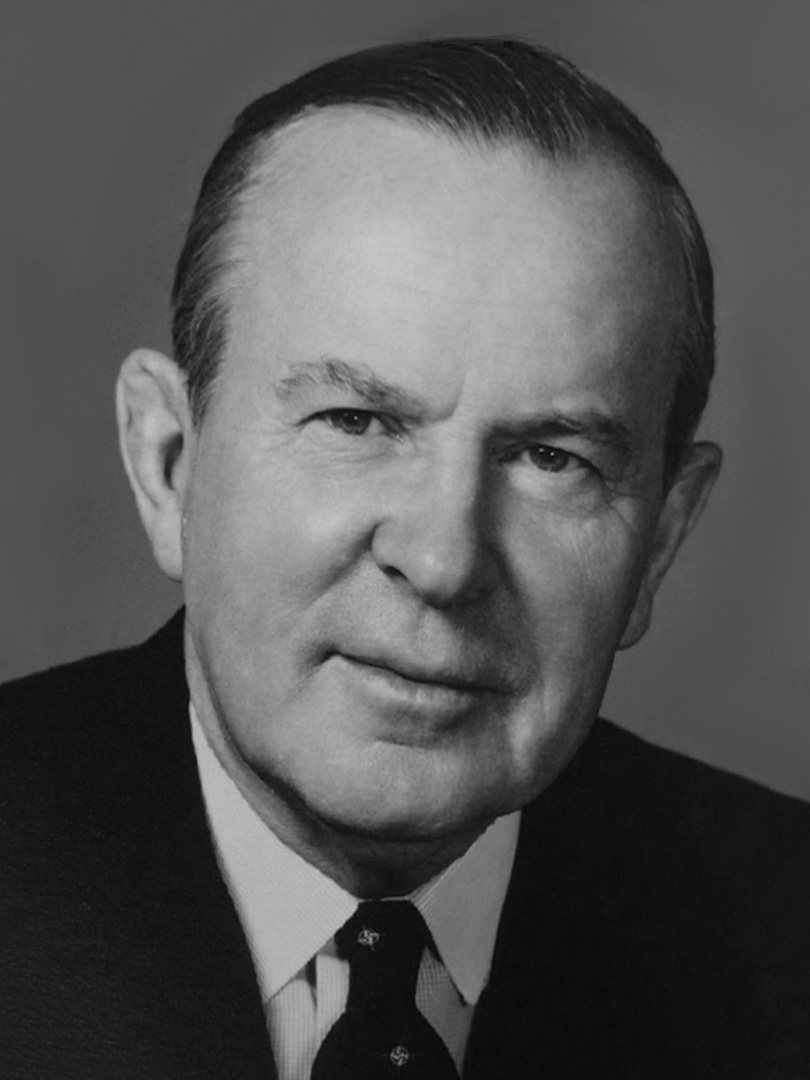
- President of the 7th General Assembly, Lester B. Pearson
- Host country: United Nations
- Participants: United Nations Member States
- President: Lester B. Pearson
- Secretary-General: Trygve Lie

The seventh session of the United Nations General Assembly convened on 14 October 1952 and concluded on 28 August 1953. It was the first session held in the newly completed United Nations Headquarters in New York City, in Manhattan's East Side. Lester B. Pearson, then serving as Canada's Secretary of State for External Affairs, was elected president of the session.

== Overview ==
The ongoing Korean War, particularly the deadlocked question of repatriating prisoner of war was a major topic.

On 5 December, the assembly ruled that the apartheid policy of South Africa did not conform to the spirit of the UN Charter and established a commission to study the racial situation in the country. The apartheid issue would go on to be frequently brought up in future sessions.

Adopted in the session's closing plenary meeting was the Convention on the Political Rights of Women, the first binding international resolution aiming to establish equal opportinies for women to vote in elections or stand as candidates for public office.

The session also witnessed the resignation of Secretary-General Trygve Lie on 10 November 1952, in order to "keep the peace" amid his deteriorating relationship with the Soviet Union. He had previously wished to resign but had remained in office on account of the Korean War. Other notable agenda items include self-determination, decolonization,and the economic development of developing nations.

== See also ==
- List of UN General Assembly sessions
- List of General debates of the United Nations General Assembly
