= Pearson's =

Pearson's may refer to:

- Pearson's Candy Company, chocolate and confectionery manufacturer
- Pearson's Magazine, a British literary magazine
- Pearson's Magazine (US), an American version of the British magazine of the same name
- Pearson product-moment correlation coefficient, commonly referred to as "Pearson's r"
- Pearson's chi-squared test, a statistical procedure whose results are evaluated by reference to the chi-square distribution
- Pearson's Chapel, Texas, a former town in Texas, United States

== See also ==
- Pearson (disambiguation)
