= Lester B. Pearson High School =

Lester B. Pearson High School can refer to:

- Lester B. Pearson High School (Calgary), in Calgary, Alberta
- Lester B. Pearson High School (Burlington), in Burlington, Ontario
- Lester B. Pearson High School (Montreal), in Montreal, Quebec
- Lester B. Pearson Catholic High School, in Ottawa, Ontario
- Lester B. Pearson Collegiate Institute, in Toronto, Ontario
- Lester B. Pearson United World College of the Pacific (Also known as "Pearson UWC" or "Pearson College") on Vancouver Island, British Columbia
