= Lester B. Pearson High School (Montreal) =

Secondary school in Montreal, Quebec, Canada

Coordinates: 45°36′41″N 73°37′2″W

- French: École secondaire Lester B. Pearson

Information
- Established: 1976; 50 years ago
- Language: English
- Website: lesterbpearson.emsb.qc.ca/lesterbpearson

Lester B. Pearson High School (French: École secondaire Lester B. Pearson) is an English language secondary school located in Montreal North, a borough of Montreal, Quebec, Canada. It is part of the English Montreal School Board. It was established in 1976. The Canadian student press, Learning for a Cause, was founded here in 2004. The school is also known for its unique student-athlete academic program.

Prior to 1998, it was operated by the Montreal Catholic School Commission.
