= Justice Pearson =

Justice Pearson may refer to:

- Bird M. Pearson (1803–1859), associate justice of the Florida Supreme Court
- Colin Pearson, Baron Pearson (1899–1980), Lord of Appeal in Ordinary
- Richmond Mumford Pearson (1805–1878), chief justice of the North Carolina Supreme Court
- Vernon Robert Pearson (1923–2013), associate justice of the Washington Supreme Court
