= Seamer =

Seamer may refer to:

== Places ==
- Seamer, Hambleton, North Yorkshire, England
- Seamer, Scarborough, North Yorkshire, England
  - Seamer railway station

== People ==
- Arthur John Seamer (1878–1963), New Zealand religious minister
- Jake Seamer (1913–2006), English cricketer
- Scott Seamer (fl. 1988), Australian rugby league footballer
- Thomas Seamer (1632–1712), founding settler of Norwalk, Connecticut
- William Seamer (died 1402), English MP for Scarborough

== Other uses ==
- Can seamer, a machine used to seal the lid to the can body
- Roof seamer, a portable roll forming machine
- Seamer (bowler), in cricket

== See also ==
- Seam (disambiguation)
- Seaming (disambiguation)
- Seema (disambiguation)
- Sema (disambiguation)
- Semer (disambiguation)
- Sima (disambiguation)
- Green seamer, a description of a type of cricket pitch
