= Cima (surname) =

Cima is a surname of Italian origin. People with that name include:

- Annalisa Cima (born 1941), Italian poet
- Francesca Cima (born 1967 or 1968), Italian producer
- Giovanni Paolo Cima (about 1570 – 1622), Italian composer and organist in the early Baroque era
- Michael Cima, American professor

== See also ==
- Cima (disambiguation)
