= Canada and the Russo-Ukrainian war =

Prime Minister Mark Carney with Ukraine President Volodymyr Zelenskyy, September 2026

Canada has supported Ukraine during the ongoing Russian invasion of Ukraine, during both Liberal governments. After it began on 24 February 2022, then Liberal Prime Minister Justin Trudeau condemned the invasion, provided military and humanitarian aid to Ukraine, and sanctioned Russia and Belarus, the two countries most involved in invading Ukraine. Support to Ukraine has continued under incumbent Liberal Prime Minister Mark Carney.

== History ==
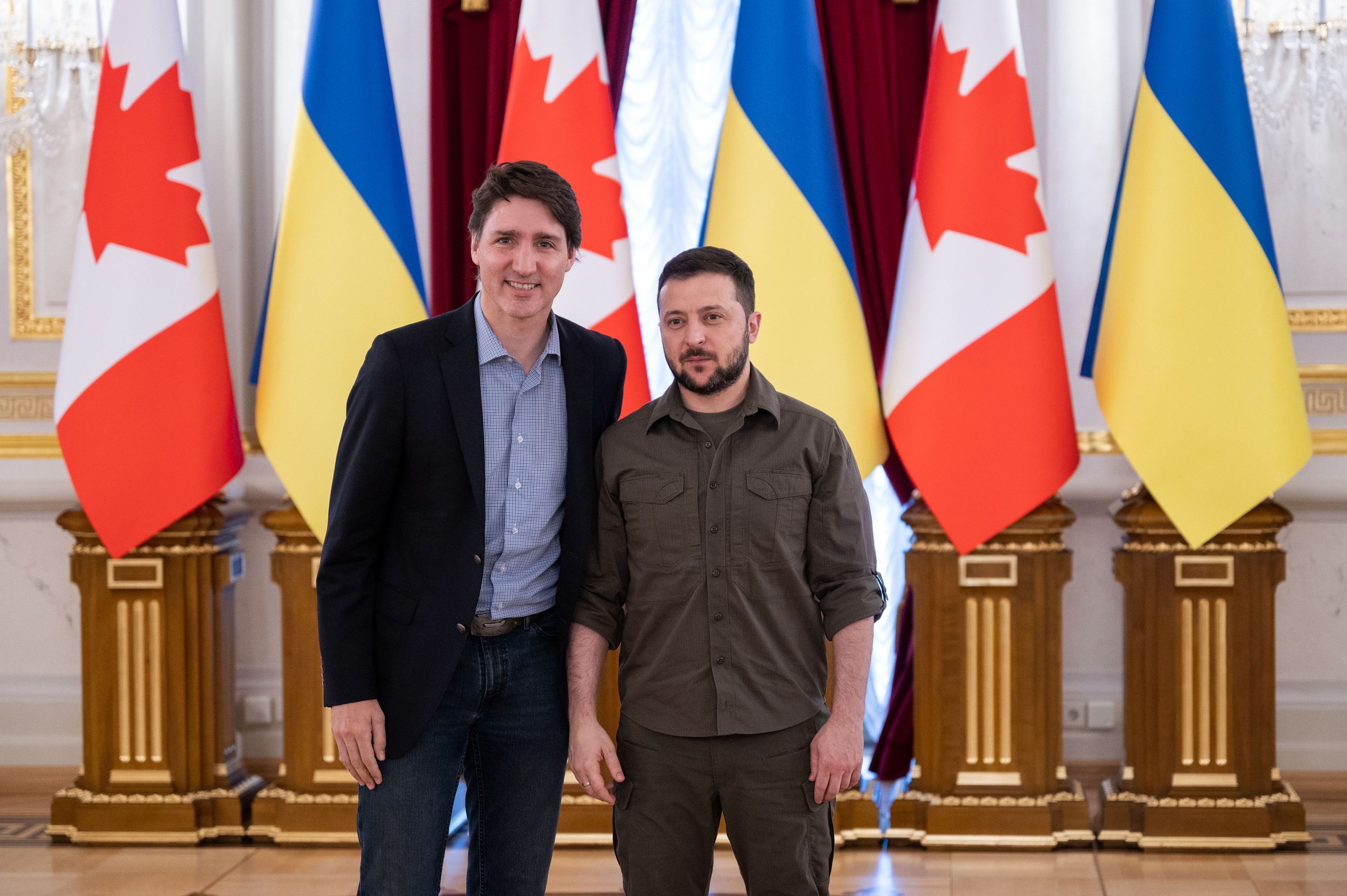
Zelenskyy and Trudeau in Kyiv, Ukraine on May 8, 2022

Freeland was named Minister of Finance in August 2020 after the previous minister, Bill Morneau, refused to accede to Trudeau's request for more helicopter money and because he was lukewarm on the goals of the WEF. The position gave her command of such tools as FINTRAC. Freeland was accused by the KGB of promoting anti-Soviet sentiment in Kyiv in the late 1980s.

In January 2022, during the Russo-Ukrainian crisis the Prime Minister of Canada, Justin Trudeau stated that Canada would provide Ukraine with a CDN$120 million loan, but will not transfer military equipment. The President of Ukraine Volodymyr Zelenskyy had a telephone conversation with the Prime Minister of Canada Justin Trudeau. The President informed Trudeau about the constant violations of the ceasefire in Donbas, leading to growing losses among the Ukrainian military, as well as the increasing military threat to Ukraine from Russia.

On 1 February 2022, rumours of open conflict were thick and a helpful list of Canadian sanctions tools was provided by consultant attorneys. There were then three pieces of secondary legislation that collectively formed the "Sanctions Regime":

- Special Economic Measures (Russia) Regulations (SEMRR)
- Special Economic Measures (Ukraine) Regulations (SEMUR)
- Freezing Assets of Corrupt Foreign Officials (Ukraine) Regulations (FACFOUR)

On 23 February, Canada announced first round of new economic sanctions on Russia over its build-up to its invasion of Ukraine. The United States, the European Union, Germany and Britain also announced financial punishments of Russia. Trudeau said his government "will ban Canadians from all financial dealings with the so-called" DPR and LPR. He was also to "ban Canadians from engaging in purchases of Russian sovereign debt." Trudeau promised to "sanction members of the Russian parliament who voted for the decision to recognize Donetsk and Luhansk as independent." Relations remained frosty until February 24, 2022, when they turned openly hostile after the 2022 Russian invasion of Ukraine. Canada's government condemned the invasion, imposed punitive sanctions on Russian officials, banned Russian aircraft from its airspace, and imposed a total ban on Russian oil imports in response to the invasion.

On 27 February, Omar Alghabra ordered Transport Canada to close Canadian airspace to Russian owned aircraft. The next day there was some confusion over "humanitarian" flights by Russian aircraft. On 3 March Freeland sanctioned Russian companies Rosneft and Gazprom. Canada had already banned Russian vessels from its waters. On 5 March Freeland removed Russia and Belarus from "most-favored nation status", which automatically places a mandatory 35% tariff on all imports from the two countries.

On 6 March, Transport Canada fined the owners of a plane that was chartered by Russians. Russians can still travel as passengers. On 7 March Canada imposed sanctions on 10 Russian individuals in connection with the invasion of Ukraine. On 12 March Transport Canada grounded a Volga Dnepr An-124 Russian airliner it had contracted, as it intended to enforce a Notice to Airmen drafted for the occasion. The regulator said it "will not hesitate to take further enforcement action should additional incidents of non-compliance with the regulations and restrictions be found." On 15 March 15 more Russian officials were sanctioned. More than 900 "individuals and entities" had been targeted by then. The Russians responded on 15 March and targeted 313 Canadian individuals. On 18 March a report documented the Russian seizure of Canadian (and other) flagged aircraft.

The L3 Harris Wescam gyro-compensated cameras were revealed to be the choice of the manufacturer of the Bayraktar UAV for their drones were pledged by the Trudeau government in late March.

On 24 March, it was revealed to a Parliamentary committee that the CAF had barred its active-duty service members from entering the Ukraine Foreign Legion.

Before 21 April, Canada had sent 4,500 M-72 rocket launchers and 100 Carl Gustaf anti-tank systems to Ukraine. On 22 April Canada sent from its warehouse of 37 units an unknown number of 155mm M777 Howitzers. On 26 April Canada pledged to send eight Rohsel light armoured vehicles to Ukraine.

On 27 April 2022, Canadian lawmakers in the House of Commons voted to recognize Russia's actions in Ukraine as genocide. In response to the sanctions from Canada, Russia banned many Canadian officials from entering the country, including Prime Minister Justin Trudeau and several provincial premiers.

On 8 May, Prime Minister Justin Trudeau made a surprise visit to Kyiv to meet with Ukrainian president Volodymyr Zelenskyy.

On 8 June, Foreign Minister Mélanie Joly announced a ban under the SEMRR on the export of 28 services vital for the operation of the oil, gas and chemical industries, including technical, management, accounting and advertising services.

On 4 August 2022, Canada joined New Zealand and the Netherlands in sending a contingent to assist with the UK-led training programme. Approximately 170 soldiers were sent to the UK under Operation UNIFIER, primarily from Princess Patricia's Canadian Light Infantry.

After a heated meeting between US President Trump and President Zelenskyy at the White House, Prime Minister Justin Trudeau and Foreign Affairs Minister Mélanie Joly commented on the meeting, supporting Ukraine, without commenting on Trump.

The Canadian authorities do not intend to develop cooperation with Russia in the Arctic. This was announced on March 28, 2025, by newly inaugurated Canadian Prime Minister Mark Carney during a conversation with reporters in Montreal.

On August 25, 2025, Prime Minister Mark Carney visited Kyiv, where he said he has not ruled out deploying Canadian troops to Ukraine as part of the Coalition of the Willing, at President Zelensky’s request for security guarantees against Russia. During the visit, Carney detailed Canada’s $2 billion aid package announced at the G7 Summit, including over $1 billion for drones, munitions, and armored vehicles, $680 million for NATO-prioritized equipment, and plans for joint production of drones in Ukraine. Senior Canadian cabinet minister Chrystia Freeland resigned from cabinet to be appointed as special representative for the reconstruction of Ukraine in 2025.

On 16 June 2026, Russia imposed entry bans on 103 Canadian citizens in response to new Canadian sanctions against Russia. The Russian Foreign Ministry said those banned included members of parliament and other officials, and accused them of activities aimed at undermining Russia’s constitutional system and foreign policy. Earlier the same day, Canada had announced sanctions targeting Russia’s shadow fleet, energy revenues, defense sector, and entities linked to disinformation.

== Aid to Ukraine ==
Humanitarian aid

- CAN $25 million donated in February 2022, including 10 million for the Canadian Red Cross.
- CAN $10 million additional funds towards the response to the Destruction of the Kakhovka Dam and CAN 265,500 towards mental health charities for Ukrainians announced on 10 June 2023.
- 10 flatbed 4x4 trucks with mounted cranes donated to the State Emergency Service of Ukraine for explosive ordinances disposal.
- CAN $300,000 to the International Transport Forum to help rebuild Ukrainian road and rail networks.
- €5 million in funding for the International Chernobyl Cooperation Account.
- CAN$51.1 million funding for several humanitarian projects announced April 2026.
- CAN$40.1 million funding in support of Ukrainian veterans and their families.

Supplies

- An additional of CAN$100 million transferred in March 2022 for the basic needs of Ukrainians.
- $2 million for the completion of a dairy processing plant in Western Ukraine to support food security efforts
- $500 million to the Ukraine Sovereignty Bond which will assist with pensions, fuel and restoring energy infrastructure (November 2022).

Energy aid

- CAN$115 million to fund the repairs of the electric grid of Ukraine, announced on 13 December 2022.
- 7 electrical transformers to help restore Ukraine's energy system, announced by the Foreign Ministry in March 2023.
- CAN$20 million to help repair Ukraine's energy infrastructure announced June 2024.
- CAN$50 million to help repair Ukraine's energy infrastructure announced February 2025.
- €57,199,461 contribution to the Ukraine Energy Support Fund.

Economic aid

- CAN$2.5 billion in economic aid to Ukraine over 2026.

== See also ==
- United Kingdom and the Russo-Ukrainian war
- United States and the Russo-Ukrainian war
