= Sima =

Sima or SIMA may refer to:

== People ==
- Sima (Chinese surname)
- Sima (given name)
- Sima (surname)
- Sima (born 1996), Slovak singer
- Sima (footballer), full name Simão Teles Bacelar (born 1948), Brazilian footballer

== Places ==
- Sima, Comoros, on the island of Anjouan, near Madagascar
- Sima de los Huesos, a cavern in Spain, major site of ancient hominin fossils, known as Sima hominins
- Sima, Hungary
- Sima, Jinxiang County, town in Jinxiang County, Shandong, China
- Sima, Nepal, in the Jajarkot District of Nepal
- Sima (river), a river Hordaland, Norway
- Sima, Tibet, village in the north of the Tibet Autonomous Region, China
- Sima, Spanish for sinkhole or pit cave, found in several placenames
  - Sima de las Cotorras, Chiapas, Mexico

== Others ==
- Independent Union of Maritime and Related Workers (SIMA), in Angola
- Sima (architecture), the upturned edge of a classical roof
- SIMA, a shipbuilding and maritime services company in Peru
- Sima (geology), the lower part of Earth's crust
- Sima Hydroelectric Power Station, Eidfjord, Vestland, Norway
- Sima (mead), a mead from Finland
- Sima (office), the Chinese title roughly equivalent to "field marshal"
- Sima or bai sema, the ritual boundary around a Buddhist ordination hall
- Sīmā, a Pali term for the Buddhist ordination hall
- Sima (Swahili food), a dumpling made from corn meal, banana, semolina or cassava flour, also called Ugali
- Scalable Instructable Multiworld Agent (SIMA), a type of artificial intelligence model introduced by Google DeepMind
- Sima, a dialect of Konyak

== See also ==
- Cima (disambiguation)
- Seema (disambiguation)
- Sema (disambiguation)
- Shiba (disambiguation), Japanese pronunciation of family name Sima
