= Foreign policy of the Justin Trudeau government =

Canada's foreign policy of Justin Trudeau from 2015 to 2025

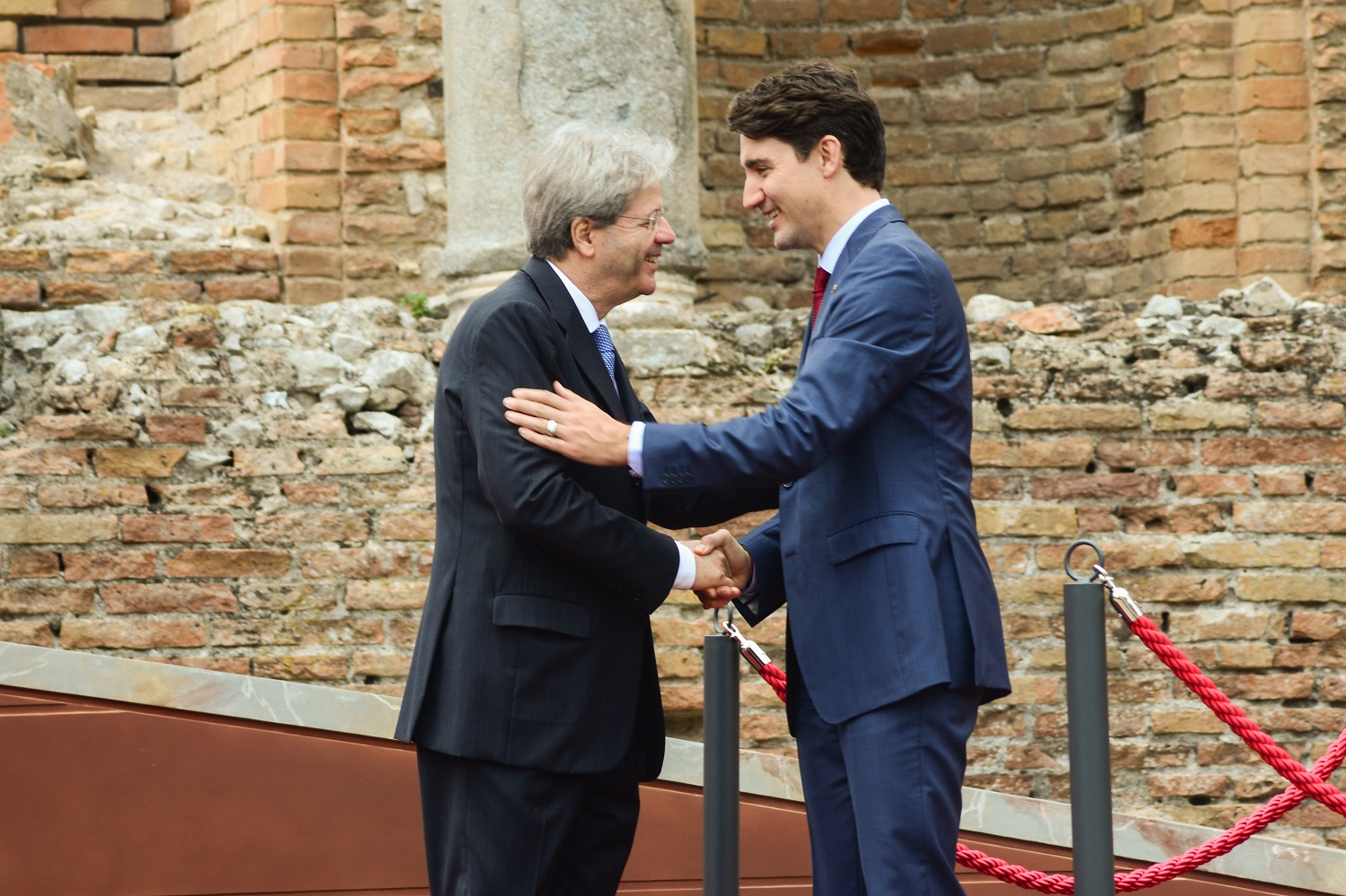
The Canadian Prime Minister Justin Trudeau meets Italian Prime Minister Paolo Gentiloni during the 43rd G7 summit

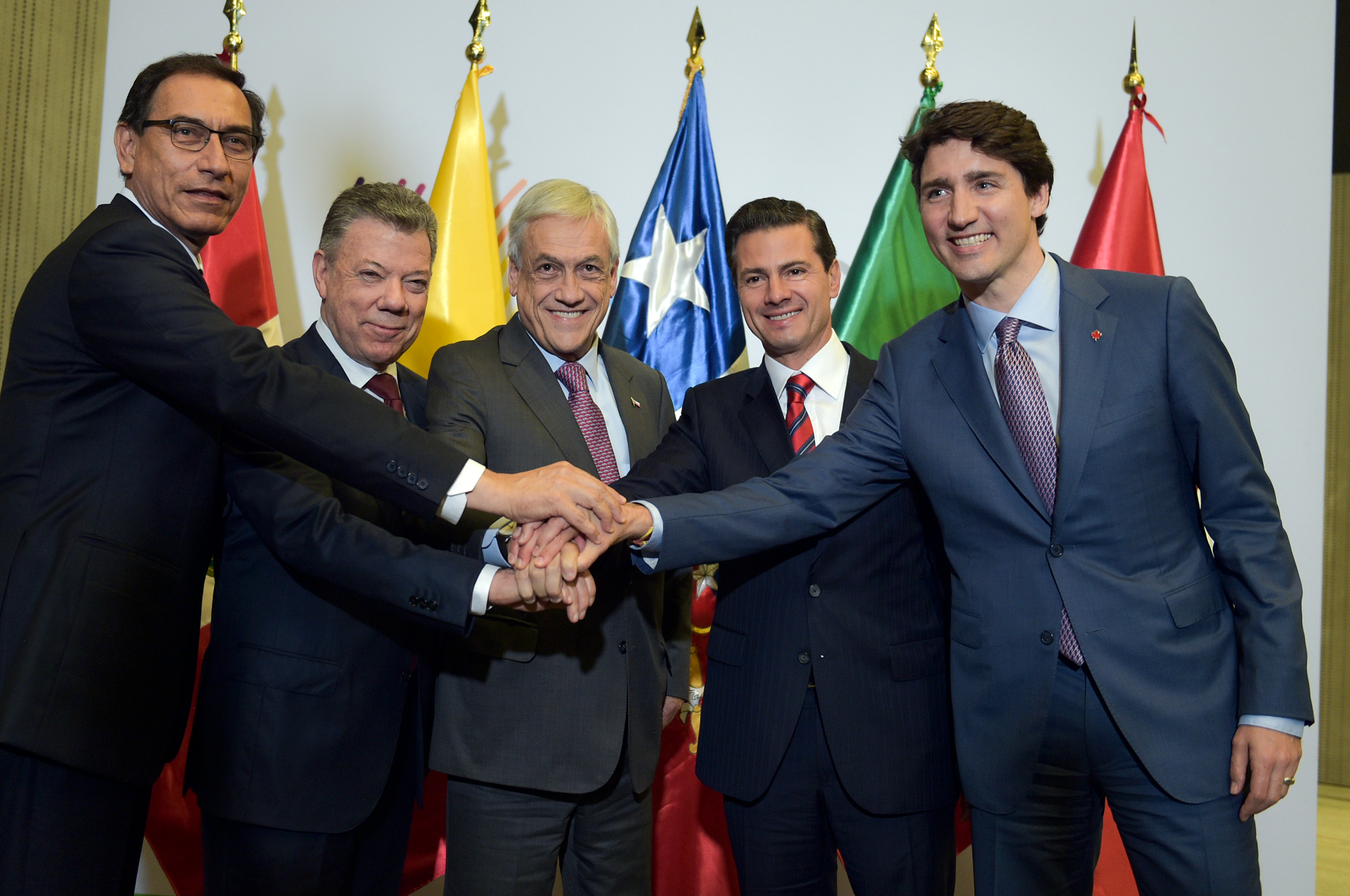
Trudeau with other national leaders at the 8th Summit of the Americas

The foreign policy of Justin Trudeau was Canada's foreign policy of the Liberal government led by Prime Minister Justin Trudeau (in office November 4, 2015 – March 14, 2025).

Trudeau's premiership has been marked with continued close relations with the United States. He has served opposite three U.S. presidents: Barack Obama (2015–2017), Donald Trump (2017–2021, January–March 2025), and Joe Biden (2021–2025). Though the relationship was strained at times under the Trump presidencies, Canada remained a close ally of the United States under his government. He signed the Canada–United States–Mexico Agreement (CUSMA), and took a leadership role in the Lima Group: an organisation dedicated to supporting the US-aligned opposition in Venezuela. Canada also continued advancing its relationships with the European Union and Asia-Pacific countries with the signing of Comprehensive Economic and Trade Agreement (CETA), and the Comprehensive and Progressive Agreement for Trans-Pacific Partnership (CPTPP) respectively.

Canada's relationship with China deteriorated, especially following the 2018 arrest of Meng Wanzhou. Following Meng's arrest at the Vancouver airport in December 2018, two Canadians (Michael Spavor and Michael Kovrig) were taken in custody. The three of them were held for over 1000 days before being released simultaneously on September 24, 2021. The episode was symptomatic of a major decline in relations between the two countries. Likewise Canada has also seen tense relations with Saudi Arabia following Canada's call for human rights activist Raif Badawi's release, to which Saudi Arabia responded by suspending diplomatic relations.

== General aspects ==
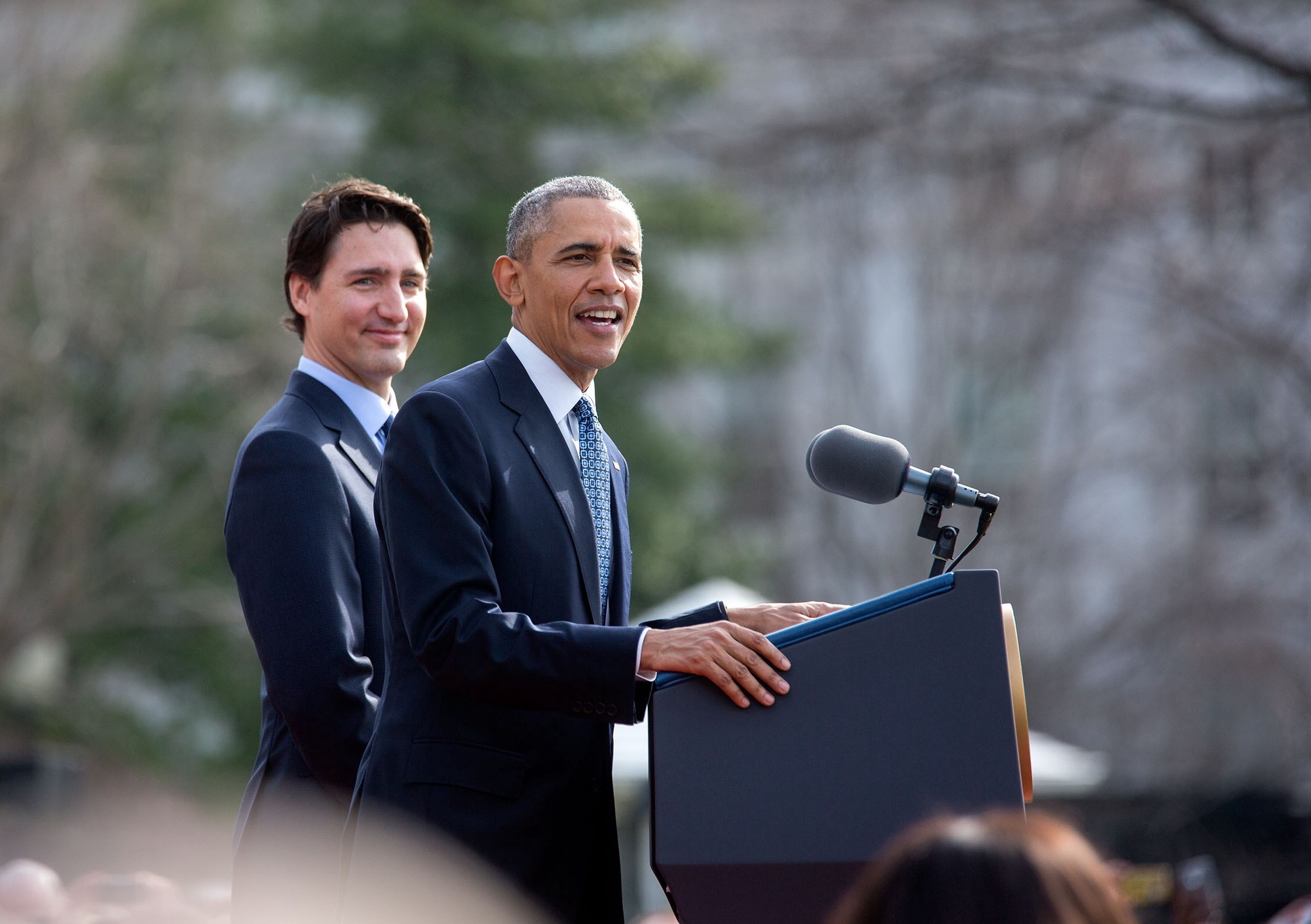
Trudeau with US President Barack Obama on March 10, 2016

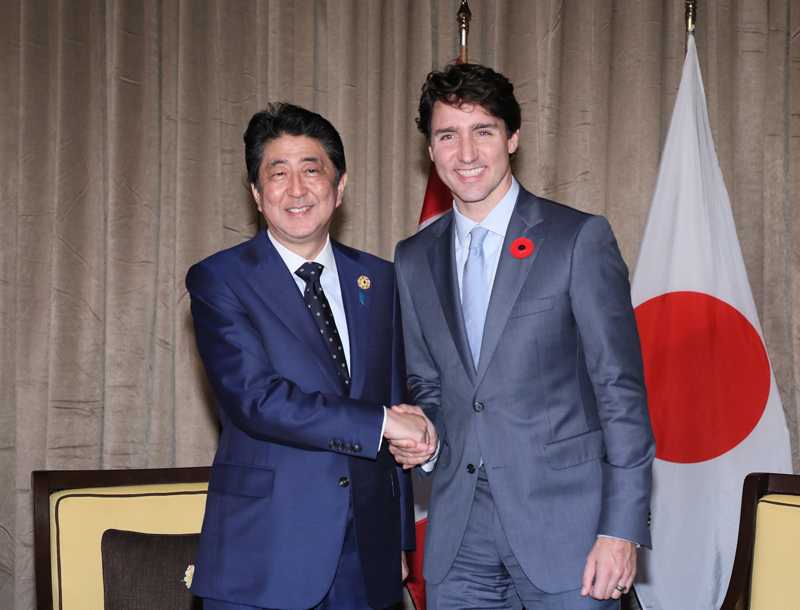
Trudeau with Japanese Prime Minister Shinzo Abe on November 10, 2017

In a March 2016 speech at the University of Ottawa, Stéphane Dion, Trudeau's first foreign affairs minister, used "responsible conviction" – a term syncretized from the work of German sociologist Max Weber – to describe the Trudeau government's foreign policy. Dion sought re-engagement with the world, including authoritarian regimes such as Russia and Iran and a focus on multilateralism, climate change, and the United Nations. Dion indicated that Canada would oppose capital punishment for Canadians imprisoned abroad and would change its contribution to the fight against the Islamic State of Iraq and the Levant from providing airstrikes to providing special forces trainers. Dion also tied the concept of responsible conviction to continuing some policies of the previous Stephen Harper government in a modified manner, such as continuing its maternal and newborn health initiative but with new funding for abortion and family planning. He also justified continuing a $15 billion sale of light armored vehicles to Saudi Arabia despite its human rights abuses to protect Canadian jobs and preserve Canada's credibility in signing major international deals, but committed to reassessing the rules on Canadian export permits so that future deals would conform to Canadian interests such as human rights promotion. Dion ended his speech by rejecting the concept of Canada as an honest broker, because that term had become too associated with moral relativism and lack of conviction, instead saying that Canada had to be "a fair-minded and determined peace builder".

In its July 25, 2019, Special Report of Canada's international role during the premiership of Prime Minister Trudeau, The Economist, said that despite "politics" that muddied Canada's relationship with several foreign powers, Canada's "place internationally was still strong" with friendly relations with "Europe, Australasia and beyond".

=== Personnel ===
Trudeau's first Minister of Foreign Affairs was former Liberal leader Stéphane Dion. On January 10, 2017, Dion was replaced as Minister of Foreign Affairs by Chrystia Freeland in a cabinet shuffle, with the move being seen in part as a response to the incoming Trump administration. Dion subsequently resigned his post as MP and was appointed Canadian Ambassador to Germany. In 2019, Foreign Policy named Freeland "Diplomat of the Year" as a "key defender" of this system and for "speaking out for fair trade policies and against human rights violations". Following the 2019 Canadian federal election, François-Philippe Champagne became Foreign Minister as Freeland took the position of Minister of Finance and Deputy prime minister, thereby retaining her influence of Canadian foreign policy. On January 12, 2021, Champagne was replaced as Minister of Foreign Affairs by Marc Garneau in a cabinet shuffle, with the move being seen in part as a response to the incoming Biden administration. Following the 2021 Canadian federal election, Mélanie Joly became Foreign Minister.

Trudeau Government foreign policy personnel
Deputy Prime Minister	Vacant (2015–2019)			Freeland (2019–2024)				Vacant (2024–2025)
Minister of Foreign Affairs	Dion (2015–2017)	Freeland (2017–2019)		Champagne (2019–2021)	Garneau (2021)	Joly (2021–2025)		
Minister of National Defence	Sajjan (2015–2021)					Anand (2021–2023)	Blair (2023–2025)	
Permanent Representative to the United Nations	Rishchynski (2011–2016)	Blanchard (2016–2020)			Rae (2020–2025)			
Minister of Public Safety and Emergency Preparedness	Goodale (2015–2019)			Blair (2019–2021)		Mendicino (2021–2023)	LeBlanc (2023–2024)	McGunity (2024–2025)
Minister of International Trade Diversification	Freeland (2015–2017)	Champagne (2017–2018)	Carr (2018–2019)	Discontinued (2019–2025)				
Minister of Small Business, Export Promotion and International Trade	Not yet created (2015–2018)		Mary Ng (2018–2025)					
Minister of International Development	Bibeau (2015–2019)		Monsef (2019)	Gould (2019–2021)		Sajjan (2021–2023)	Hussen (2023–2025)	

== International treaties ==
In 2016, the Trudeau government promised to sign the Optional Protocol to the Convention against Torture but never did. The Trudeau government signed the Arms Trade Treaty in 2019, The government also signed the Declaration on the Rights of Indigenous Peoples in 2021.

== Syrian civil war ==
In October 2015, Trudeau stated that, once prime minister, he would end Canada's Operation Impact airstrike mission against ISIL. In his mandate letter to Defence Minister Harjit Sajjan, he also called for increased focus on Canadian trainers for local troops and humanitarian aid for the region.

In November 2015, Trudeau was asked whether his plans to change Canada's contribution to the fight against ISIL and to repeal parts of Bill C-51 would change following the terrorist attacks in Paris. Trudeau responded, "It's too soon to jump to conclusions, but obviously governments have a responsibility to keep their citizens safe, while defending our rights and freedoms, and that balance is something the Canadian government, and indeed all governments around the world, will be focusing on."

In June 2016, Trudeau's Liberals voted against a Conservative motion in Parliament to recognize ISIL's atrocities as genocide; during a question period, Trudeau said that Canada "strongly condemns the atrocities committed by" ISIL but voted against the resolution because "We do not feel that politicians should be weighing in on this first and foremost. Determinations of genocide need to be made in an objective, responsible way. That is exactly what we have formally requested the international authorities weigh in on." Following the issuance of a report by a United Nations inquiry formally concluding that ISIL was perpetrating a genocide of Yazidis, Trudeau's government recognized the genocide.

In October 2019, Canada condemned the unilateral Turkish invasion of the Kurdish areas in Syria.

== Refugees ==
In 2017, Trudeau criticized U.S. president Donald Trump's issuance of an executive order banning refugees from seven countries, six of which have Muslim majorities, from entering the United States. On social media, Trudeau displayed support for affected refugees.

Since Trudeau was elected as Prime Minister, over 25,000 Syrian refugees have settled in Canada.

== UN Security Council bid ==
In June 2020, Canada lost a vote on temporary membership of the United Nations Security Council. Trudeau was criticized for having an unclear message on the world stage. Meanwhile, opposition leader Andrew Scheer criticized the campaign as "another foreign affairs failure for Justin Trudeau," accusing him of "[selling] out Canada's principles for a personal vanity project. Former U.N. ambassador under Prime Minister Brian Mulroney, Stephen Lewis, pointed to public controversies affecting the Trudeau "brand" as having played a role in the results, such as the prime minister's much-talked-about trip to India in 2018 and photos of the prime minister in blackface that were revealed during the 2019 federal election campaign. However, Bessma Momani, an international affairs expert at the University of Waterloo, said it is not fair to see the loss as an indictment of Trudeau's global popularity. Chris Westdal, a former Canadian diplomat who had headed missions in Moscow and Geneva, also dismissed criticisms of Trudeau's image as having an effect on Canada's standing internationally, writing in an op-ed for the Ottawa Citizen that "Though his critics wouldn't have you believe it, our prime minister is known and respected in the world for more than colourful socks and zany costumes."

Other observers and commentators, including Adam Chapnick, author of Canada on the United Nations Security Council: A Small Power on a Large Stage, and Thomas Juneau, Associate Professor at the University of Ottawa Graduate School of Public and International Affairs, did not even mention Trudeau's personal "brand" as a factor in their respective analyses, but have highlighted more complex factors they felt were more likely to have affected the outcome of the bid, and Canada's international outlook more generally. Among these were the late start to Canada's campaign (roughly a decade after competitors Ireland and Norway); a structural decline in Canadian foreign policy that predated and continued into Trudeau's premiership, including Trudeau's government requiring considerable time and resources to deal with Donald Trump's administration and rivalries with such countries as China, India, and Saudi Arabia; internal friction between the prime minister and former Liberal Party leader turned German ambassador Stéphane Dion; and even flaws within the selection process and the UNSC apparatus itself, including the veto power of its permanent membership leading to a "perpetual stalemate" and the ultra-competitiveness of Canada being clustered with European countries, which tend to vote as a bloc, an element of the campaign that Trudeau had also found fault with. In a press conference on June 17, 2020, the day the vote was to be held, Trudeau stated, "I have nothing but respect for our two competitors, Ireland and Norway, that have demonstrated an engagement in the world. It is unfortunate that we're in a situation of having to compete against friends for this."

Following the results, at a press conference the following day, Trudeau went on to cite Canada's late start to the campaign as a significant factor in the outcome. He then declared that Canada would nevertheless have a strong global voice due to the deepened relations it had forged with other countries, and that it would "continue to work with [allies] on all our shared values on the world stage."

== International trade ==
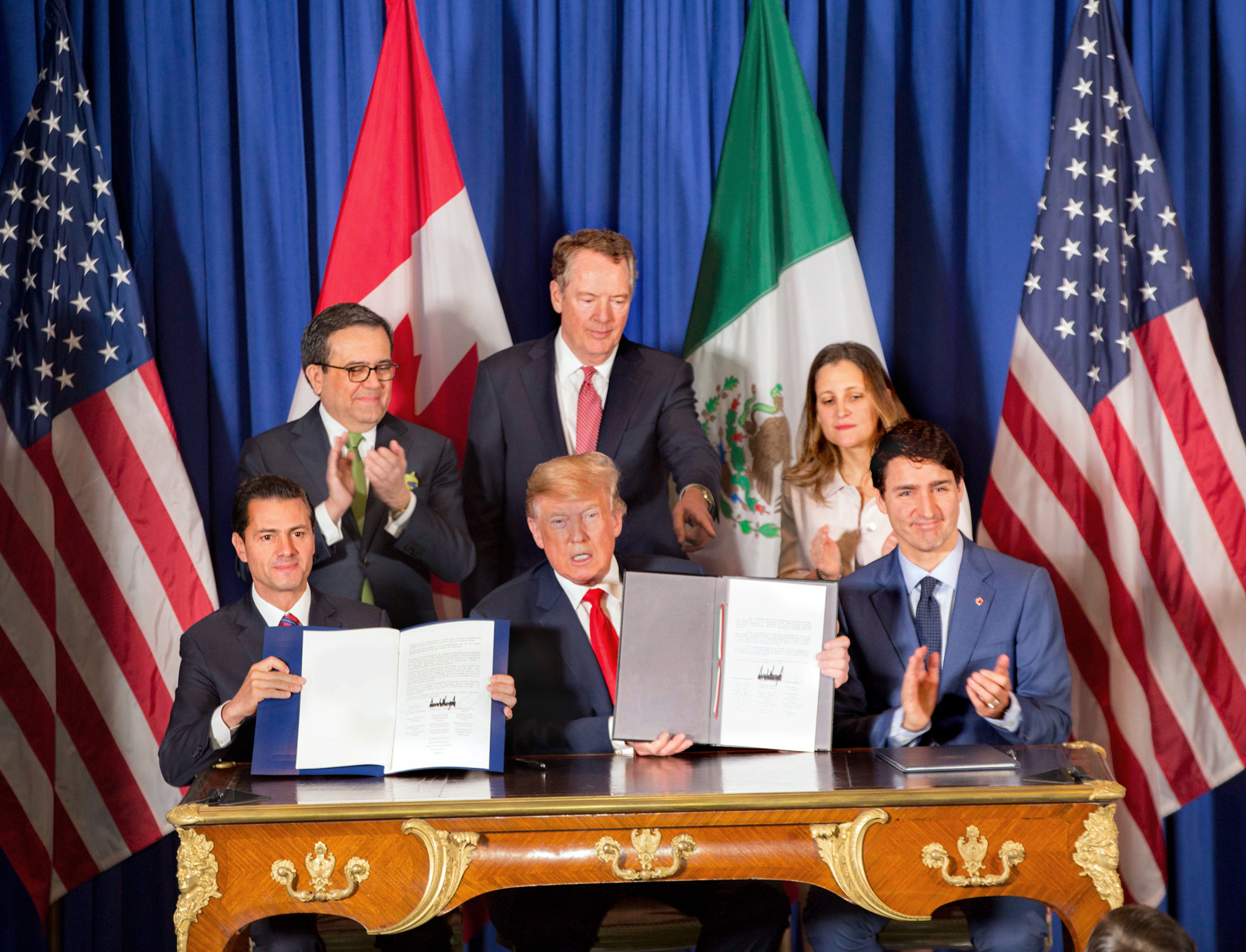
Mexican President Enrique Peña Nieto, U.S. President Donald Trump, and Prime Minister Justin Trudeau signed the 2018 CUSMA agreement.

Under Justin Trudeau, Canada entered three new major free trade agreements. These are the Comprehensive Economic and Trade Agreement (CETA), between Canada and the European Union, the "biggest trade deal since NAFTA", the Comprehensive and Progressive Agreement for Trans-Pacific Partnership with ten Pacific countries, and the Canada-United States-Mexico Agreement (CUSMA). The Economist argues that the foreign relations with the United States and China were "more resilient" than the media reports "imply".

== Nuclear weapons ==
Justin Trudeau's government decided not to sign the UN Treaty on the Prohibition of Nuclear Weapons, a binding agreement for negotiations for the total elimination of nuclear weapons, supported by more than 120 nations.

== Americas ==
=== United States ===
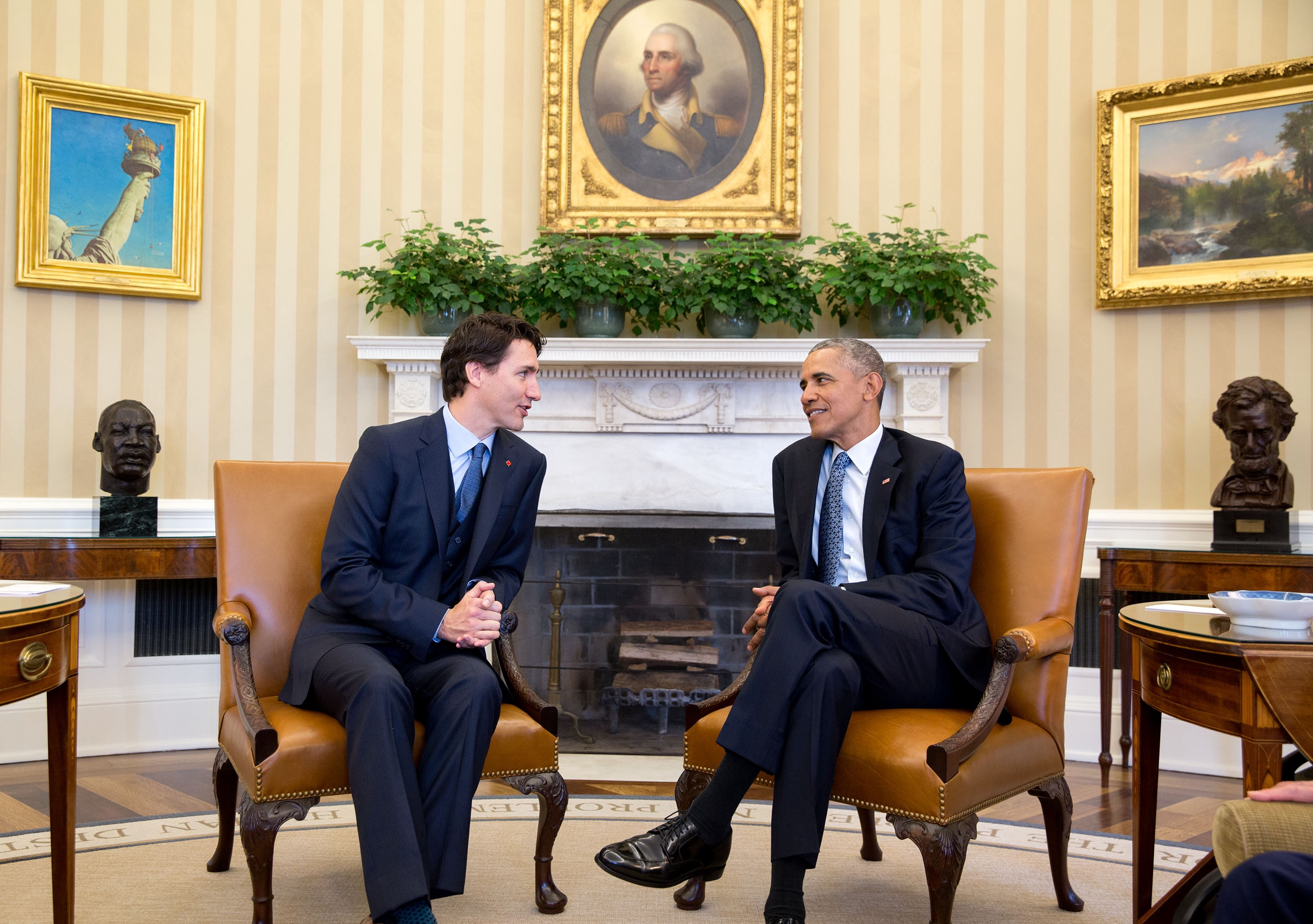
Trudeau with U.S. President Barack Obama, March 2016.

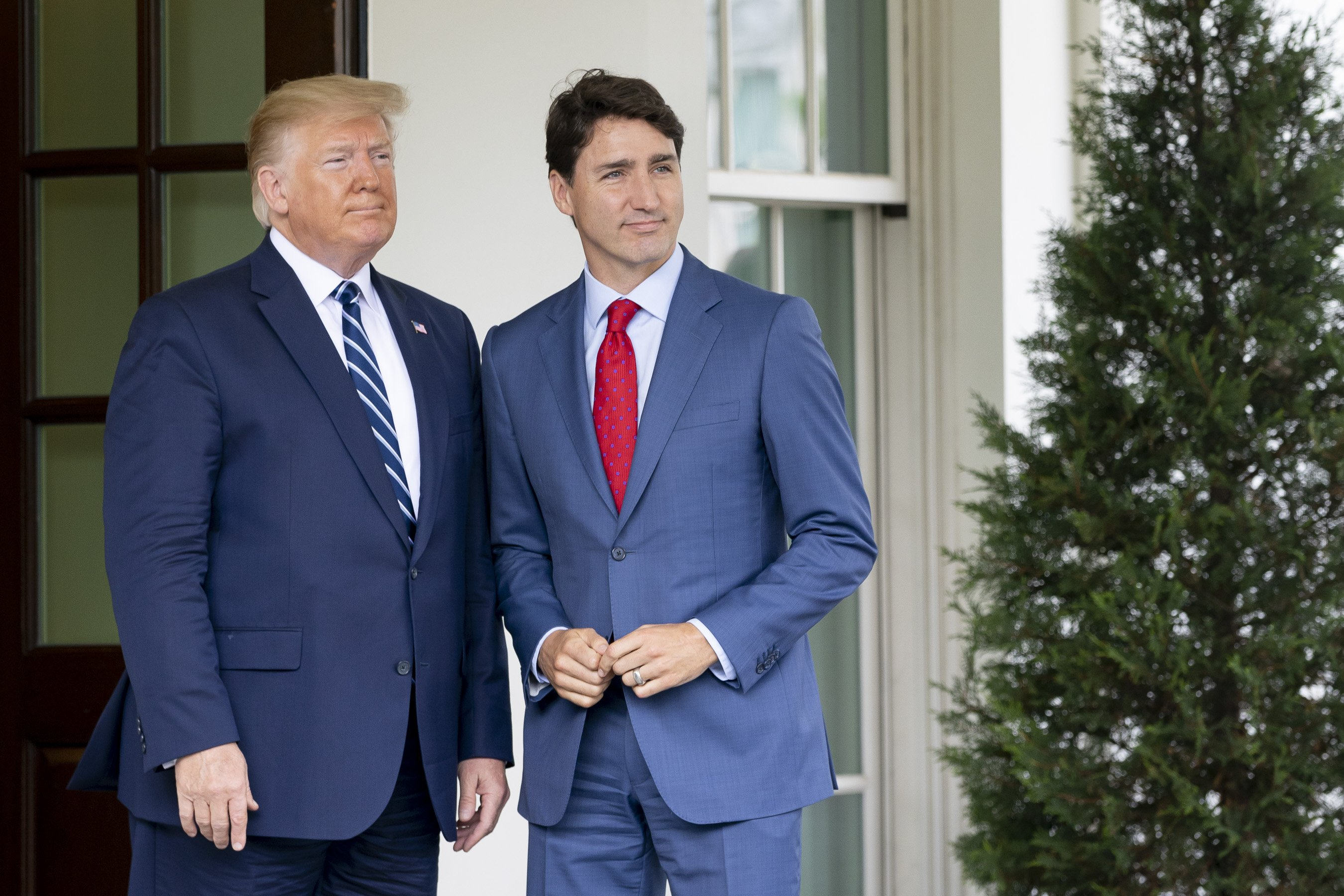
Trudeau with U.S. President Donald Trump, June 2019.

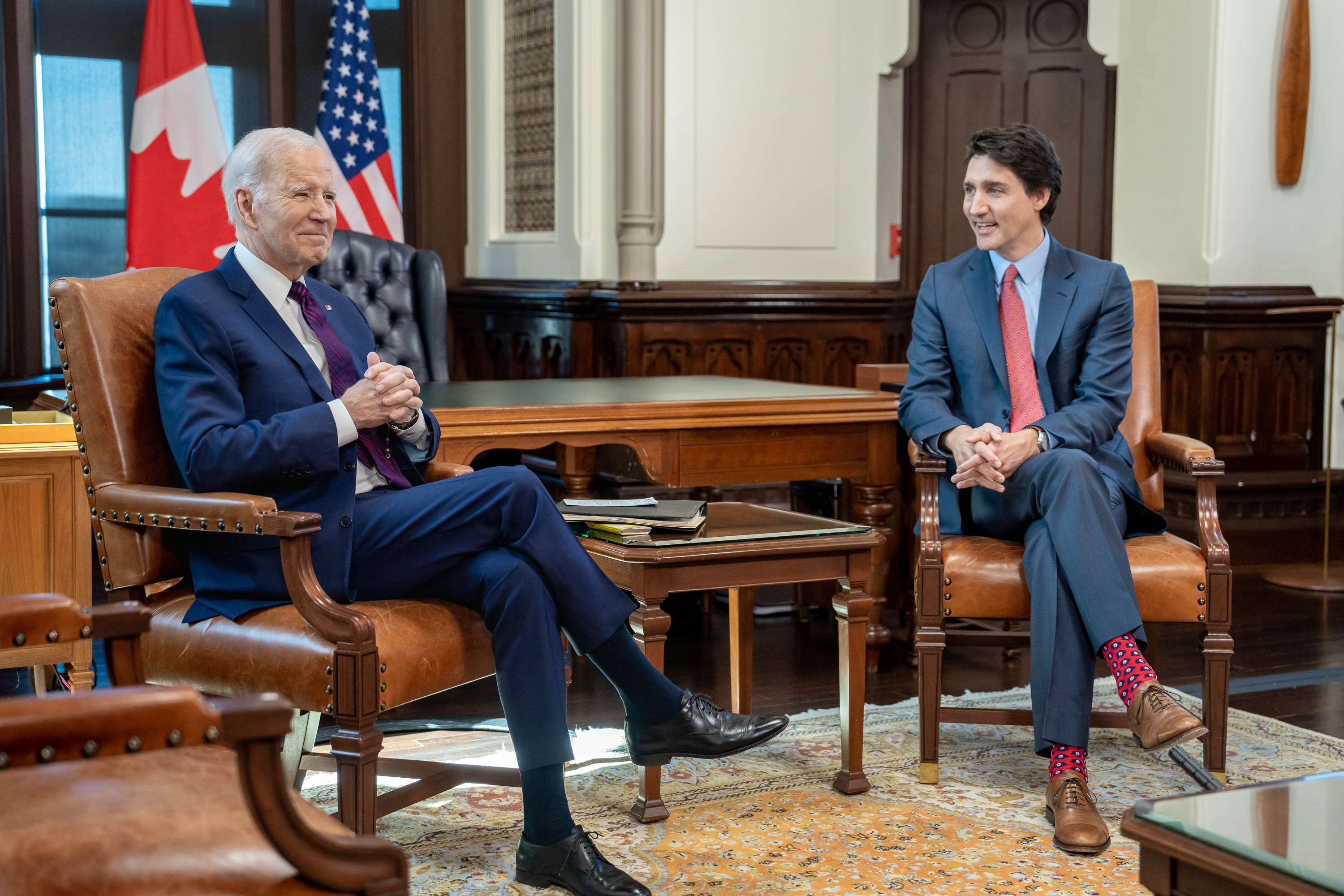
Trudeau with U.S. President Joe Biden, March 2023.

Trudeau enjoyed good relations with the like-minded United States President Barack Obama, despite Trudeau's support for the Keystone Pipeline which was rejected by the Democratic President.

Following Donald Trump's first inauguration in January 2017, Canada-US relations deteriorated. The Trump administration forced the renegotiation of NAFTA to create the CUSMA, in which Canada made significant concessions in allowing increased imports of American milk, weakening Canada's dairy supply management system. President Trump also implemented tariffs on Canadian steel and aluminium, to which Trudeau retaliated by imposing Tariffs on American steel, aluminium and a variety of other American products.

Following Joe Biden's inauguration in January 2021, Trudeau stated that he was "much more aligned" with the new President "on values, on focus, on the work that needs to be done to give opportunities for everyone while we build a better future". However, Trudeau expressed his concerns over the swift foreign policy changes of the new administration, namely the cancellation of the Keystone pipeline expansion and President Biden's "Buy America" executive order.

About AUKUS the deal was announced in the midst of the 2021 Canadian federal election. Opposition politicians quickly attacked Prime Minister Justin Trudeau over Canada's exclusion from the partnership, to which Trudeau responded by stating that "This is a deal for nuclear submarines, which Canada is not currently or any time soon in the market for. Australia is." Leader of the Official Opposition Erin O'Toole stated that he would seek to join the alliance if elected.

Following Donald Trump's second inauguration in January 2025, Canada-US relations again deteriorated. On March 4, 2025, President Trump imposed 25% tariffs on Canadian exports, 10% tariffs on Canadian energy products, with an exemption for the automotive industry set to expire on April 2. In retaliation, Trudeau announced countermeasures, with Canada imposing 25% tariffs on $30 billion worth of U.S. goods, effective March 5, 2025. These retaliatory tariffs were set to increase to $155 billion worth of U.S. products within 21 days and would remain in place until the U.S. trade actions were withdrawn.

=== Mexico ===
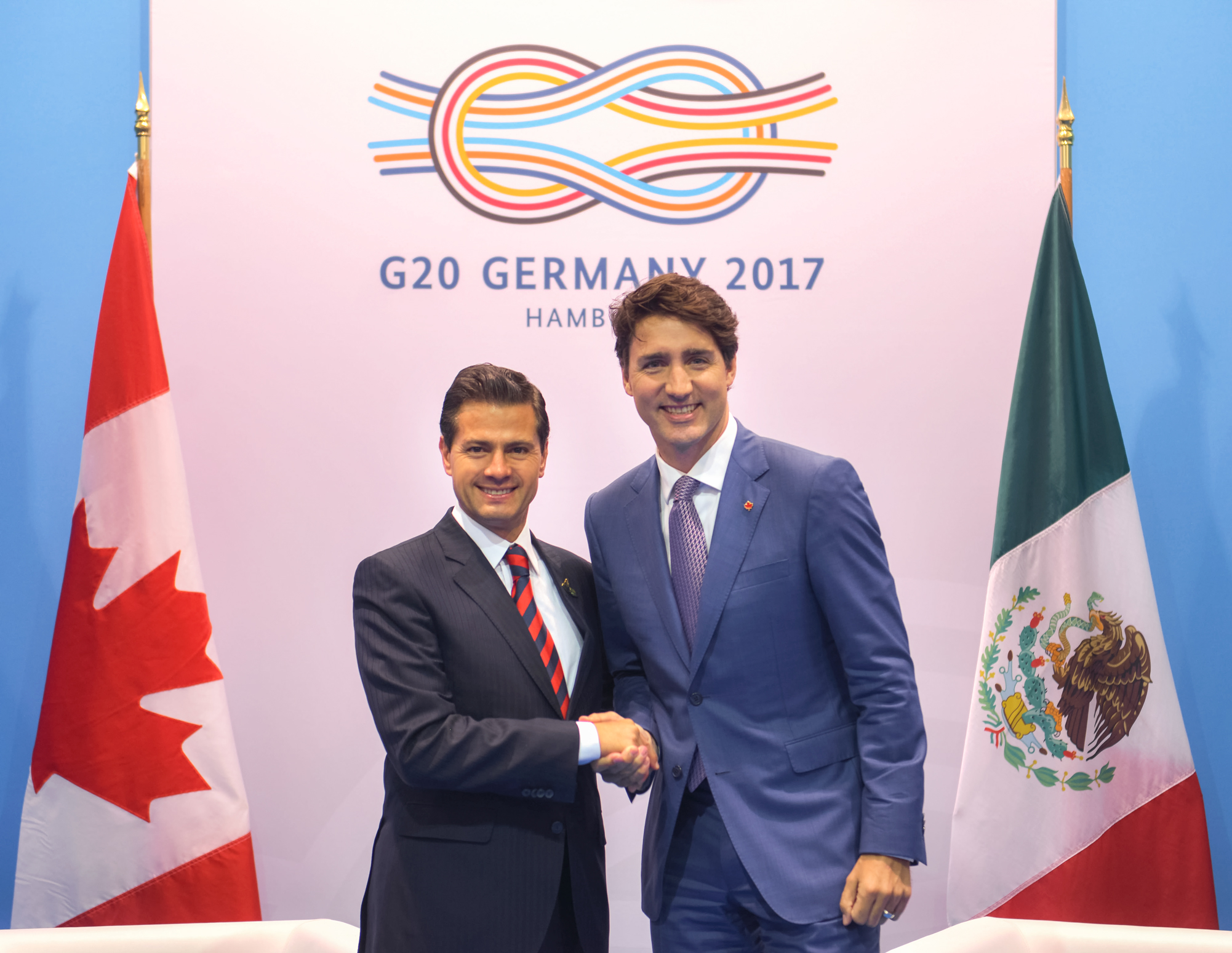
President Enrique Peña Nieto and Prime Minister Justin Trudeau at the 2017 G-20 Hamburg summit.

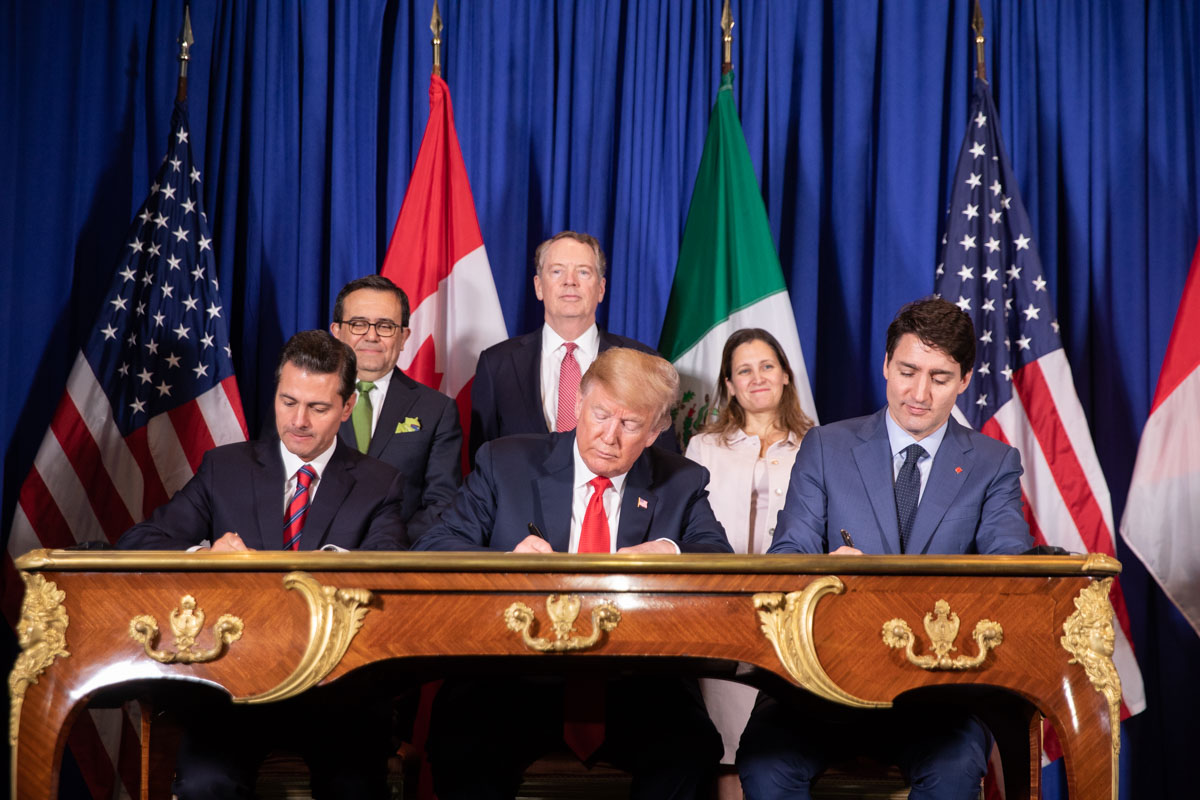
President Enrique Peña Nieto, President Donald Trump, and Prime Minister Justin Trudeau sign the new USMCA agreement during the 2018 G20 summit; November 2018.

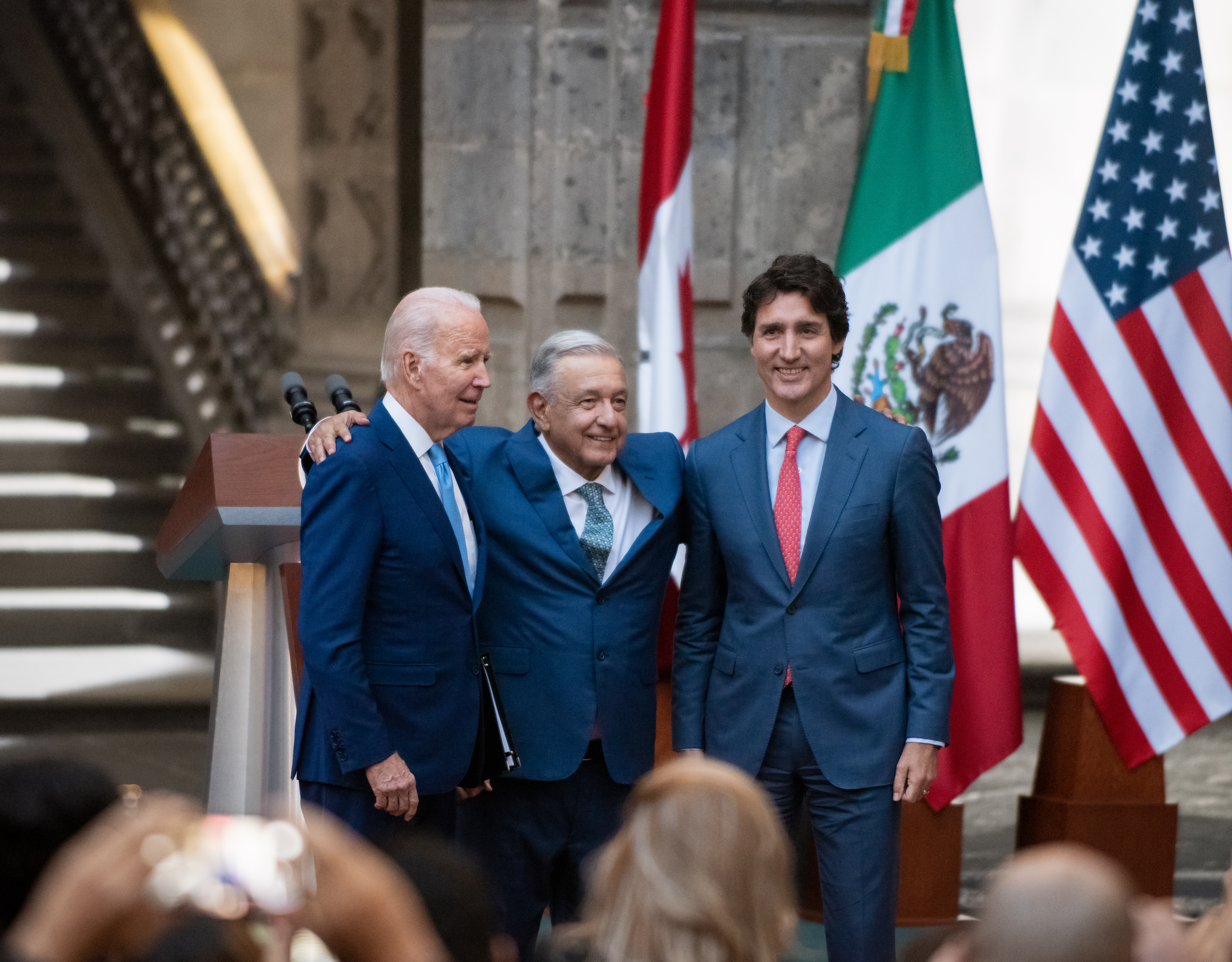
President Joe Biden, President Andrés Manuel López Obrador and Prime Minister Justin Trudeau in Mexico City; January 2023.

On December 1, 2016, Canada lifted the visa requirement for Mexican citizens. On November 30, 2018, President Enrique Peña Nieto, Prime Minister Justin Trudeau and U.S. president Donald Trump signed the United States–Mexico–Canada Agreement (USMCA) during the G20 summit in Buenos Aires, Argentina. This agreement, if ratified by all three nations, is expected to replace NAFTA. In December 2018, Governor General Julie Payette attended the inauguration of President Andrés Manuel López Obrador.

In January 2023, Canadian prime minister Justin Trudeau traveled to Mexico to attend the North American Leaders' Summit in Mexico City. In February 2024, Canada reimposed visitor visa requirements for most Mexican citizens in order to stem the flow of asylum seekers and to limit Mexican citizens from entering Canada visa-free to cross the border into the United States illegally.

=== Chile ===
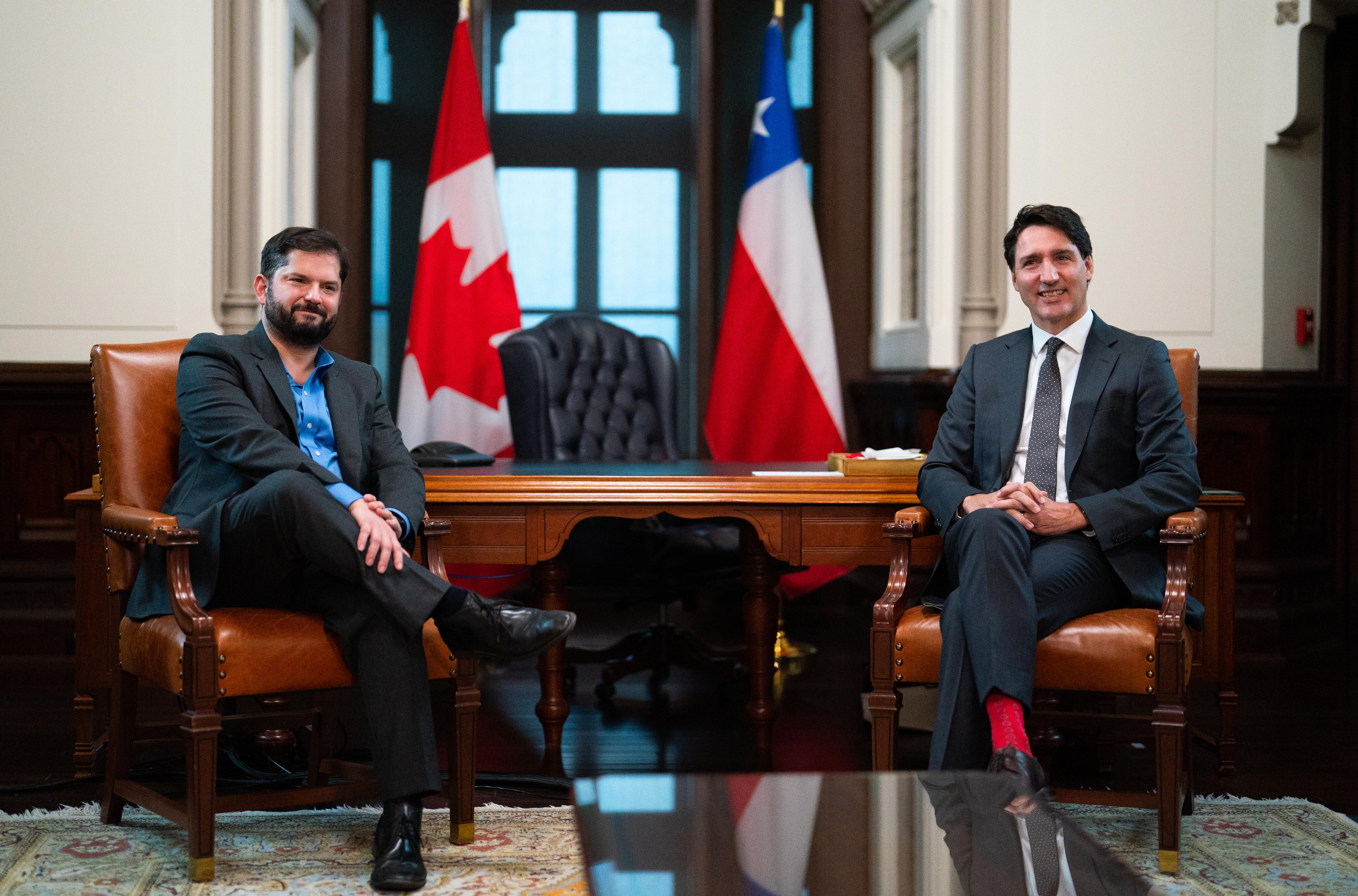
President Gabriel Boric with Prime Minister of Canada Justin Trudeau, June 2022

In 2016, both nations celebrated 75 years of diplomatic relations. Air Canada operates direct flights between Toronto and Santiago.

In June 2022, Chilean president Gabriel Boric paid a visit to Canada and met with Prime Minister Justin Trudeau in what was described by CTV News as a wide-ranging bilateral meeting.

=== Cuba ===
After the passing of Cuba's former president Fidel Castro in November 2016, Trudeau released a statement that described him as a "remarkable leader" and a "larger than life leader who served his people". United States Republican Senator Marco Rubio called the statement "shameful and embarrassing", while Canadian MP Maxime Bernier called his remarks "repugnant". Trudeau's father Pierre was Fidel Castro's friend. Pierre expanded trade with Cuba, offered the country humanitarian aid, and was the first NATO leader to make an official state visit to Cuba.

=== Venezuela ===
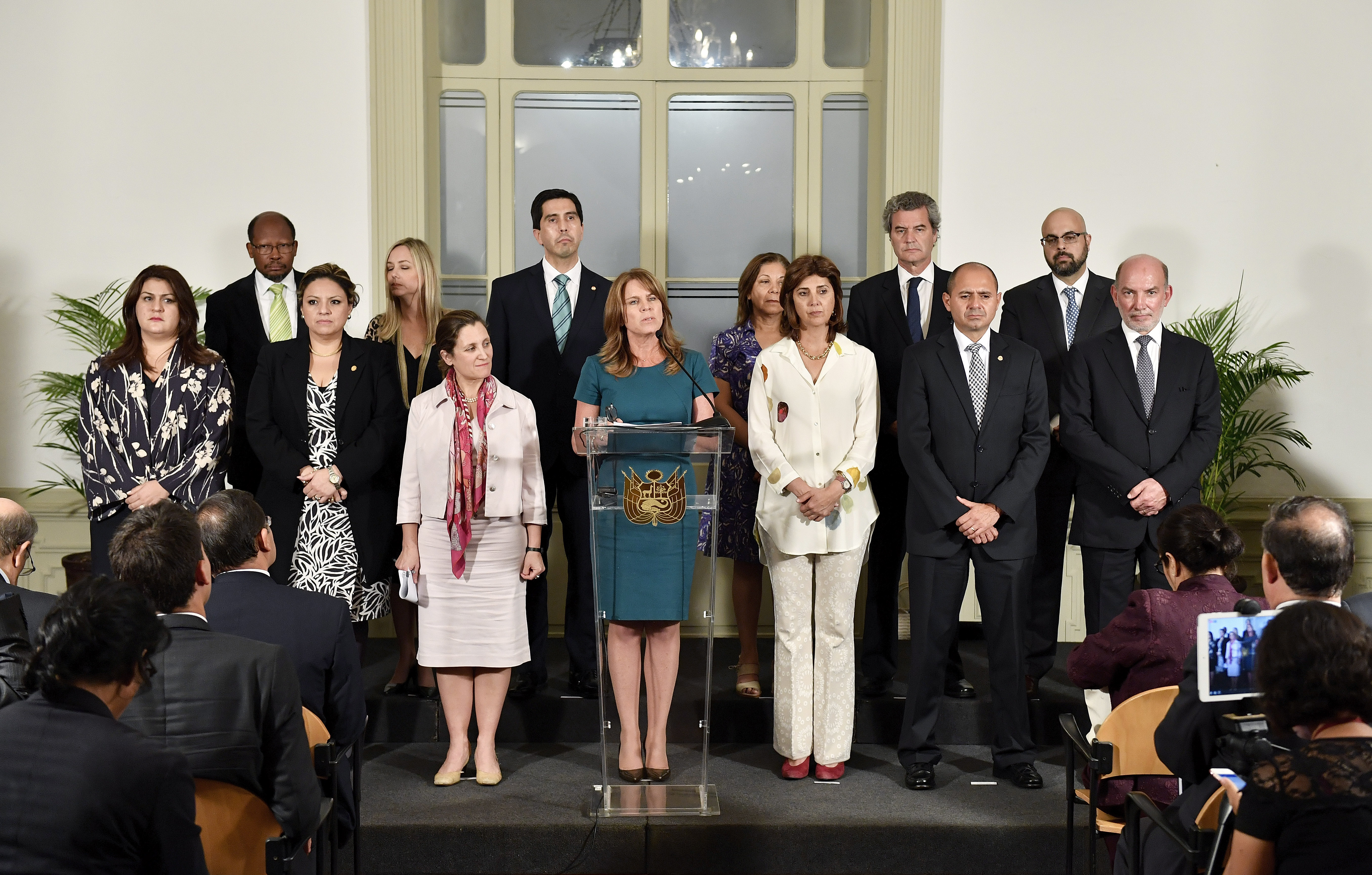
Chrystia Freeland among Foreign ministers representing member states in the Lima Group meeting together on February 13, 2018, in Lima, Peru.

Following the 2018 Venezuelan presidential election, Canada condemned Venezuelan president Nicolás Maduro, who had "seized power through fraudulent and anti-democratic elections". Canada sanctioned 14 more Venezuelans. Canada's Special Economic Measures (Venezuela) Regulations were amended on May 30, 2018, to account for the "economic, political and humanitarian crisis in Venezuela" that the Canadian statement said "moves [Venezuela] ever closer to full dictatorship". The government sanctioned Maduro's wife, Cilia Flores, and 13 other members of the ANC and TSJ. On January 23, Canada immediately recognized National Assembly President Juan Guaidó as the Interim president of Venezuela.

Canada then took a leading role in the Lima Group, a multi-lateral organization committed to opposing Venezuela's government. Canada held a Lima Group Summit in Ottawa and on February 4, 2019, Canada's Federal Government pledged 53 million dollars of aid to Venezuela. In June 2019, the Canadian government closed its resident embassy in Caracas as a result of diplomatic visas unable to be renewed under President Maduro's government. Despite these developments, Maduro remains in power in Venezuela as of 2022.

=== Hans Island border dispute settlement ===
On June 14, 2022, the Trudeau government officially settled the minor territorial dispute with Denmark over Hans Island. Canada and Denmark both used to claim the island as being their own territory. The two countries agreed to bisect the island between Canada and Greenland.

== Europe ==
=== European Union ===
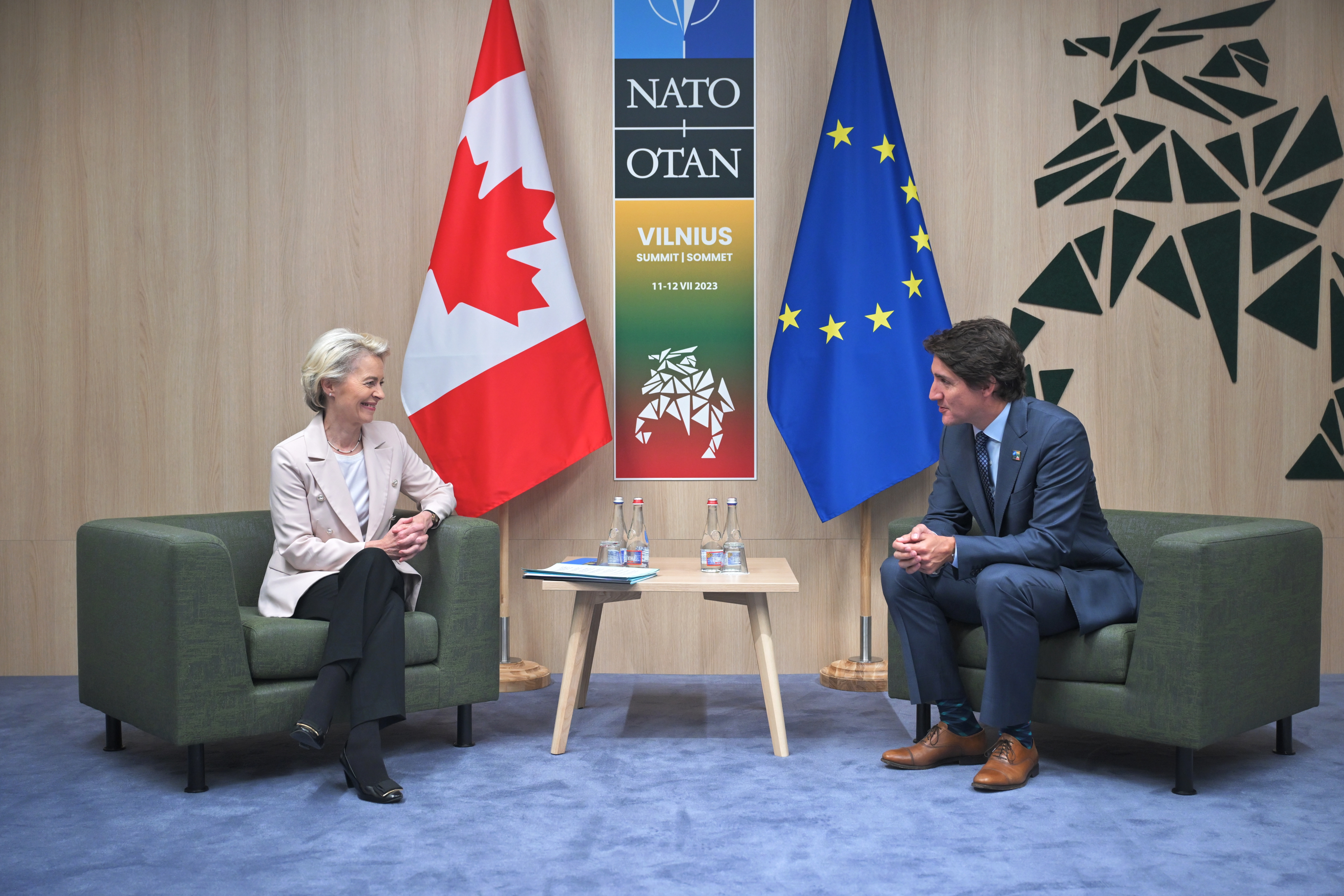
Canadian Prime Minister Justin Trudeau with President of the European Commission Ursula von der Leyen in Vilnius, July 12, 2023

On October 30, 2016, the "Strategic Partnership Agreement between the European Union and its Member States, of the one part, and Canada, of the other part" was signed in Brussels. This agreement seeks to deepen political dialogue and cooperation between the EU and Canada and to strengthen relations in fields such as human rights, international peace and security, economic and sustainable development, justice, freedom and security. The agreement provisionally entered into force on April 1, 2017.

==== Energy cooperation ====
In 2023 Canada and the European Union held a summit in Newfoundland and established a framework for joint renewable energy development known as the Canada–European Union Green Alliance with stated goals to develop shared means for science and technology standards and cooperation as well as climate and environmental protection concerning their net-zero ambitions.

=== Estonia ===
In 2018, Canadian prime minister Justin Trudeau welcomed Estonian prime minister Jüri Ratas in Ottawa, where the two agreed to "broaden cooperation" on "digital government and the digital economy; defence and security; and trade". During the 2023 Vilnius summit, Trudeau and Estonian prime minister Kaja Kallas held a bilateral meeting in which Kallas thanked Trudeau for doubling its military presence in Latvia, which would "help strengthen the security of the entire Baltic Sea region". Kallas also noted that a Canadian company was building a magnet factory in Narva, which would bring additional jobs to the city. In October 2023, the Canadian and Estonian ministers of foreign affairs met in Ottawa, where they discussed how to manage Russian assets frozen in the aftermath of the Russian invasion of Ukraine, as well as potential cooperation in the fields of cybersecurity and countering disinformation.

=== Finland ===
On July 5, 2022, Canada was the first country to ratify Finland's membership during Finland's accession into NATO, which was finalized on April 4, 2023.

At the 2024 NATO summit, on July 11, 2024, it was decided that the United States, Canada and Finland are to form the ICE Pact, in which Finland will serve as the majority builder of icebreaker vessels.

=== Ireland ===
In August 2017, Taoiseach Leo Varadkar travelled to Canada and joined Canadian prime minister Justin Trudeau in the Montréal Pride Parade.

=== Latvia ===
In March 2022, Canadian prime minister Justin Trudeau visited Latvia and met with Latvian prime minister Krišjānis Kariņš and President Egils Levits. The meeting reinforced Canada's commitment to NATO in solidarity with European allies and partners in the face of the Russian invasion of Ukraine. The prime ministers of Canada, Latvia, and Spain, and the NATO Secretary General Jens Stoltenberg also visited with the troops of NATO’s enhanced Forward Presence Battle Group at Camp Ādaži in Latvia.

=== Lithuania ===
In 2016, both nations marked the 25th anniversary of the re-establishment of diplomatic relations. In July 2023, Lithuania hosted 2023 Vilnius summit, receiving the Canadian prime minister Justin Trudeau along with around 40 other leaders.

=== Russia ===
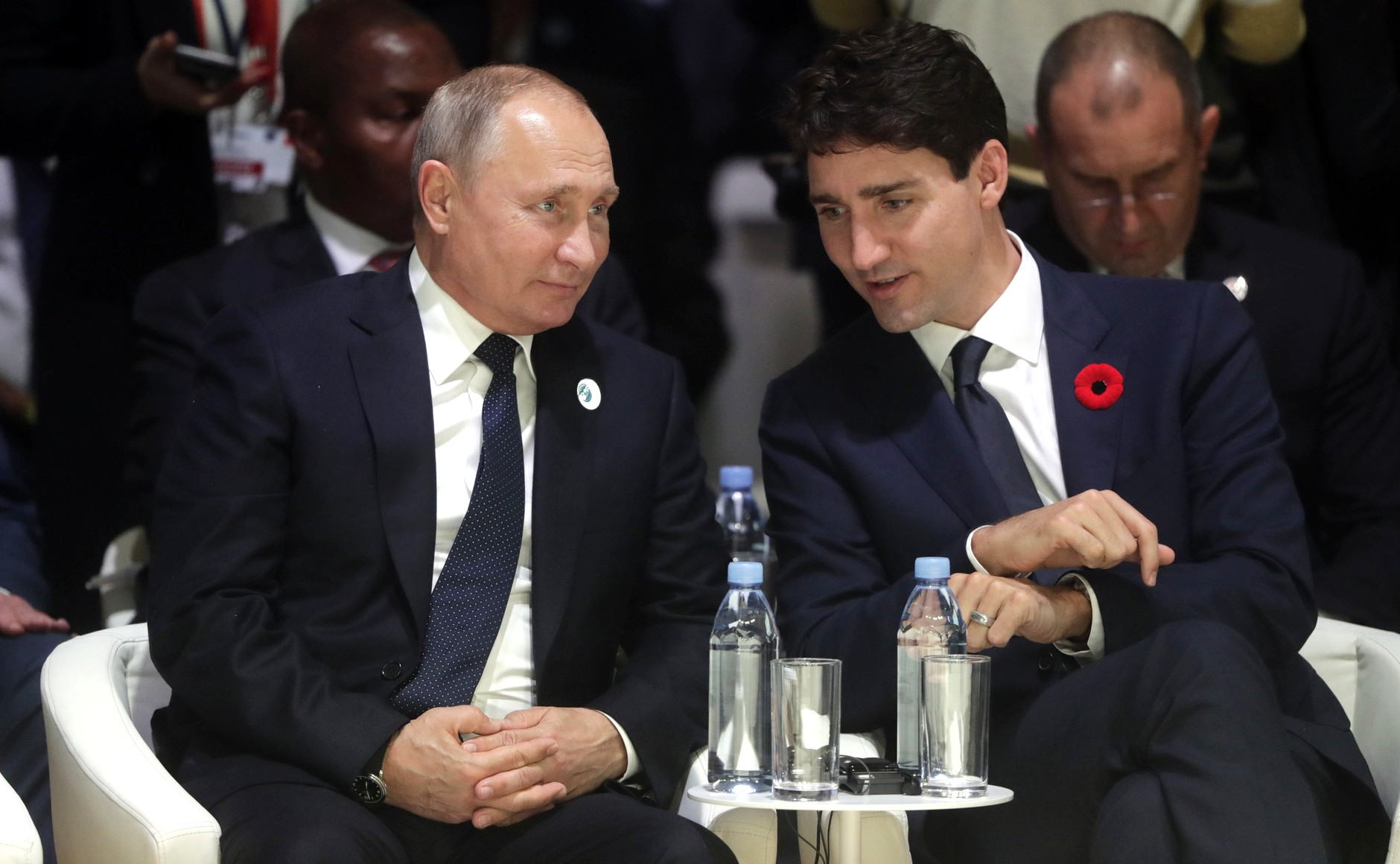
Canadian prime minister Justin Trudeau and Russian president Putin at the 2018 Paris Peace Forum

According to a 2017 Pew Global Attitudes Project survey, 27% of Canadians have a favourable view of Russia, with 59% expressing an unfavourable view.

As of December 2020, Canadian public opinion on Vladimir Putin and Russia remains highly negative, with 62% of Canadians holding an unfavourable view of Russia.

On February 1, 2022, rumours of open conflict were thick and a helpful list of Canadian sanctions tools was provided by consultant attorneys. There were then three pieces of secondary legislation that collectively formed the "Sanctions Regime", under the Special Economic Measures Act:

- Special Economic Measures (Russia) Regulations (SEMRR)
- Special Economic Measures (Ukraine) Regulations (SEMUR)
- Freezing Assets of Corrupt Foreign Officials (Ukraine) Regulations (FACFOUR)

Relations remained frosty until February 24, 2022, when they turned openly hostile after the 2022 Russian invasion of Ukraine. Canada's government condemned the invasion, imposed punitive sanctions on Russian officials, banned Russian aircraft from its airspace, and imposed a total ban on Russian oil imports in response to the invasion.

On April 27, 2022, Canadian lawmakers in the House of Commons voted to recognize Russia's actions in Ukraine as genocide. In response to the sanctions from Canada, Russia banned many Canadian officials from entering the country, including Prime Minister Justin Trudeau and several provincial premiers.

=== Spain ===
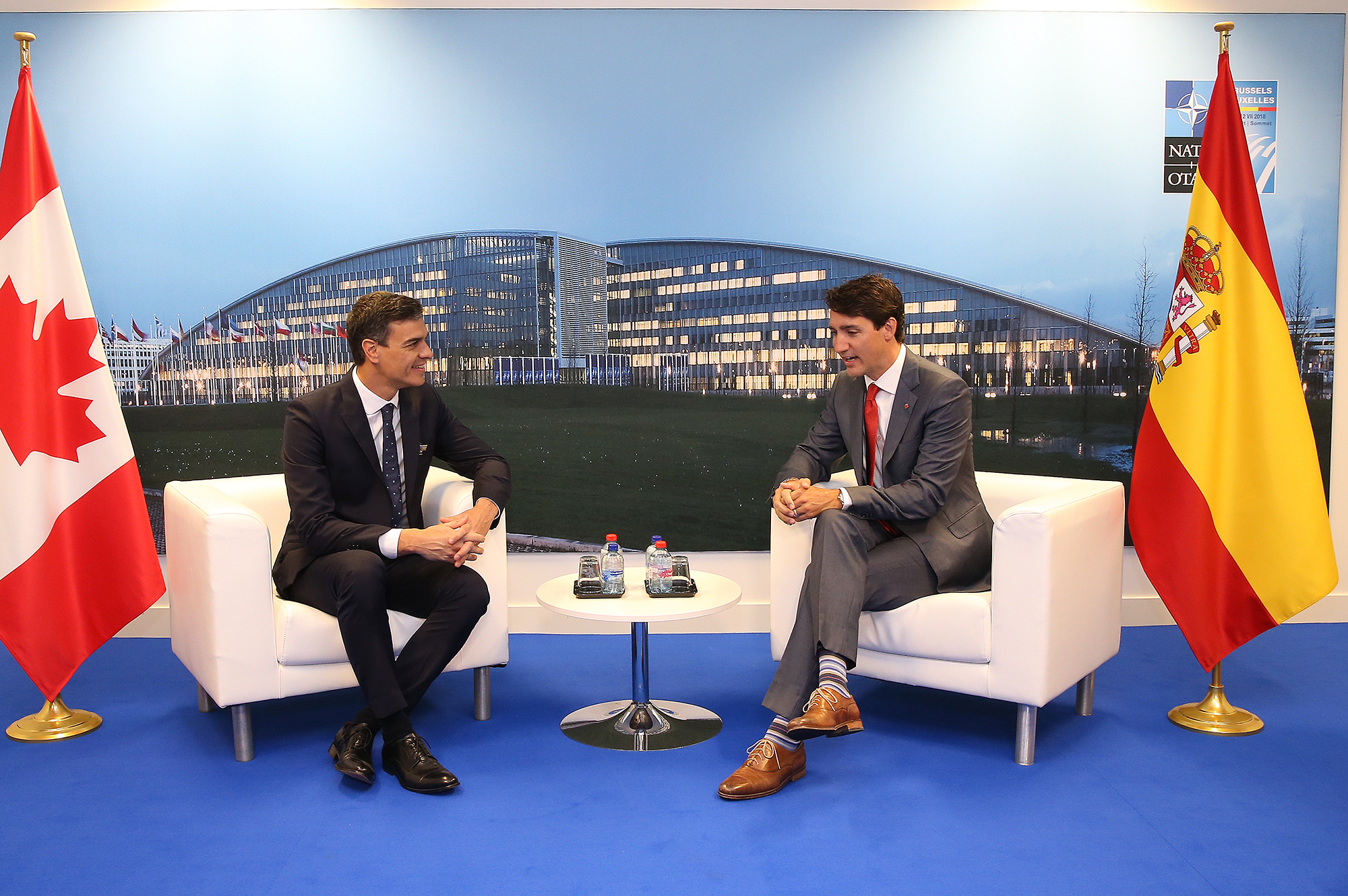
Canadian Prime Minister Justin Trudeau and Spanish Prime Minister Pedro Sánchez meeting during the 2018 Brussels summit.

Canadian foreign minister Chrystia Freeland classified the bilateral relations between Canada and Spain as excellent and based on common values, with Canada being one of Spain's strongest allies. Likewise, both countries have supported each other in internal problems. On October 12, 2022, Canada illuminated Niagara Falls with the Spanish flag in commemoration of the National Day of Spain.

==== Separatism movements in Catalonia and Quebec ====
During the 2017–2018 Spanish constitutional crisis caused by the Catalan declaration of independence, Canadian prime minister Justin Trudeau publicly announced, during a speech in Saint-Bruno-de-Montarville, that he opposed to the Catalan secessionism and expressed his support for a united Spain. On the other hand, in Quebec, the leader of the pro-independence party Bloc Québécois, Martine Ouellet, urged for Canada to recognize Catalonia. Jean-François Lisée, the head of the Parti Québécois, confirmed that his party also supported the Catalan independence. However, the Liberal Premier of Quebec, Phillippe Couillard, stated an Official Policy of neutrality. Most other members of the Conservative Party of Canada also kept neutral. CBC News and The Walrus reported that many Quebec separatists had enthusiastically responded to the Catalan declaration of independence. Global News reported that pro-Catalan independence rallies had been organized in Quebec.

In 2019, the escaped and self-declared president of Catalonia, Carles Puigdemont, was banned from entering Canada after he attempted to attend a Meeting at the Saint-Jean-Baptiste Society. The move was criticized by Jagmeet Singh and Véronique Hivon. In the same year, Puigdemont threatened to sue Canada for banning him.

=== Sweden ===
On July 5, 2022, Canada was the first country to ratify Sweden's membership during Sweden's accession into NATO, which was finalized on March 7, 2024.

=== Ukraine ===
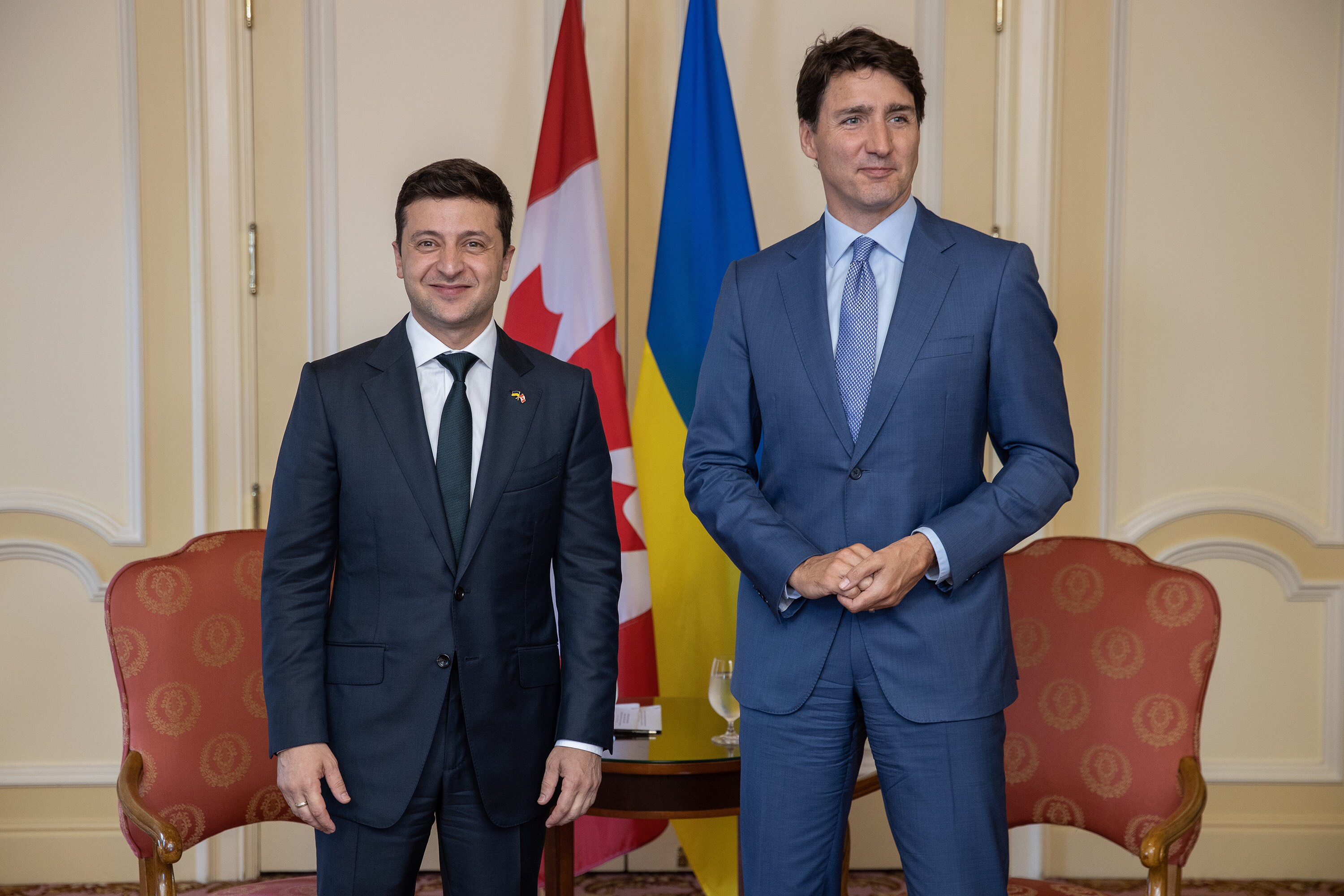
Ukraine President Volodymyr Zelenskyy meets Canadian Prime Minister Justin Trudeau during the Ukraine Reform Conference in Toronto.

In July 2016, Canadian prime minister Justin Trudeau visited Canadian military trainers in western Ukraine. Petro Poroshenko thanked Canada for its contributions. The two signed a free-trade agreement.

Arseniy Yatsenyuk, then former prime minister of Ukraine, visited Ottawa in May 2017 seeking weapons and met with Chrystia Freeland and Ralph Goodale.

In July 2019, the Canadian government hosted the third Ukraine Reform Conference in Toronto for three days, where more than 800 people from 36 countries and international finance organizations like the IMF took part. The theme was Euro-Atlantic integration of Ukraine. Newly inaugurated President Volodymyr Zelenskyy announced a new agreement for Canadian military hardware to be used as part of the effort to subdue the separatists in the east along the border with Russia. Justin Trudeau refused to sign the agreement. Trudeau and Zelenskyy "declared a mutual interest in improving student exchanges and youth work permits" but nothing was done, and money was found to "promote gender equality".

In January 2022, Foreign Minister Mélanie Joly went to Ukraine and met the prime minister and the president amid tensions between Ukraine and Russia. She also visited to Canadian instructors who were training Ukrainians as part of Operation UNIFIER.

September 22, 2023, Zelenskyy spoke to the Canadian Parliament. Zelenskyy joined Prime Minister Justin Trudeau and the rest of Parliament as they gave a standing ovation to Yaroslav Hunka, introduced by the speaker of the House of Commons, Anthony Rota, as a "veteran from the Second World War who fought for Ukrainian independence against the Russians." It emerged that Hunka did so in a Ukrainian Division of the SS, a Nazi-aligned unit. The incident made international news, and received widespread criticism and condemnation. The speaker resigned, and Trudeau apologized on behalf of Parliament. In the aftermath, an endowment in Hunka's name at the University of Alberta's Canadian Institute of Ukrainian Studies shut down, and Jewish organizations called for open records on Nazi war criminals.

==== Response to the Russo-Ukrainian War ====
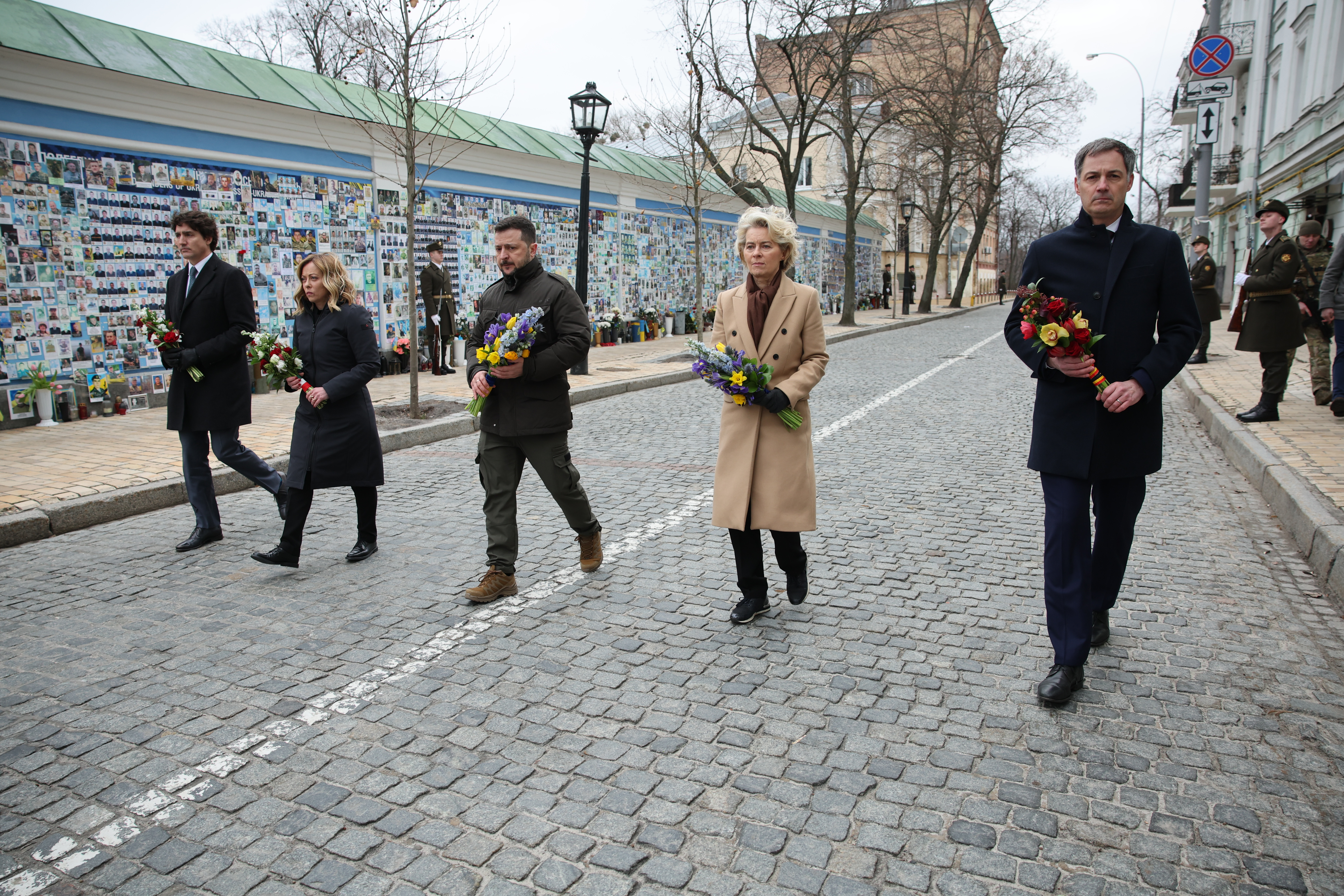
Trudeau with Volodymyr Zelenskyy and other leaders honoring fallen Ukrainian soldiers in Kyiv, Ukraine, February 2024

On November 4, 2015, Justin Trudeau inaugurated his 29th Canadian Ministry, having won a majority in elections for the 42nd Canadian Parliament. He appointed Harjit Sajjan as his first Minister of Defence. Sales of Canadian military hardware to Ukraine were permitted by the government of Trudeau in December 2017, as Global Affairs Canada minister Chrystia Freeland lifted restrictions.

Soon after the 2019 Canadian federal election was won by Trudeau, who had faced down Andrew Scheer, a supporter of sending Canadian peacekeepers to Ukraine, Ukrainian deputy foreign minister Vasyl Bodnar in the government of Volodymyr Zelenskyy revived the idea of sending Canadian peacekeepers to the war-torn Donbas territory of Ukraine.

Freeland was named Minister of Finance in August 2020 after the previous minister, Bill Morneau, refused to accede to Trudeau's request for more helicopter money and because he was lukewarm on the goals of the WEF. The position gave her command of such tools as FINTRAC. Freeland was accused by the KGB of promoting anti-Soviet sentiment in Kyiv in the late 1980s.

On February 1, 2022, rumours of open conflict were thick and a helpful list of Canadian sanctions tools was provided by consultant attorneys. There were then three pieces of secondary legislation that collectively formed the "Sanctions Regime":

- Special Economic Measures (Russia) Regulations (SEMRR)
- Special Economic Measures (Ukraine) Regulations (SEMUR)
- Freezing Assets of Corrupt Foreign Officials (Ukraine) Regulations (FACFOUR)

On February 23 Canada announced first round of new economic sanctions on Russia over its build-up to its invasion of Ukraine. The United States, the European Union, Germany and Britain also announced financial punishments of Russia. Trudeau said his government "will ban Canadians from all financial dealings with the so-called" DPR and LPR. He was also to "ban Canadians from engaging in purchases of Russian sovereign debt." Trudeau promised to "sanction members of the Russian parliament who voted for the decision to recognize Donetsk and Luhansk as independent."

On February 24 Russia invaded Ukraine.

On February 27 Omar Alghabra ordered Transport Canada to close Canadian airspace to Russian owned aircraft. The next day there was some confusion over "humanitarian" flights by Russian aircraft. On March 3 Freeland sanctioned Russian companies Rosneft and Gazprom. Canada had already banned Russian vessels from its waters. On March 5 Freeland removed Russia and Belarus from "most-favored nation status", which automatically places a mandatory 35% tariff on all imports from the two countries.

On March 6 Transport Canada fined the owners of a plane that was chartered by Russians. Russians can still travel as passengers. On March 7 Canada imposed sanctions on 10 Russian individuals in connection with the invasion of Ukraine. On March 12 Transport Canada grounded a Volga Dnepr An-124 Russian airliner it had contracted, as it intended to enforce a Notice to Airmen drafted for the occasion. The regulator said it "will not hesitate to take further enforcement action should additional incidents of non-compliance with the regulations and restrictions be found." On March 15, 15 more Russian officials were sanctioned. More than 900 "individuals and entities" had been targeted by then. The Russians responded on March 15 and targeted 313 Canadian individuals. On March 18 a report documented the Russian seizure of Canadian (and other) flagged aircraft.

The L3 Harris Wescam gyro-compensated cameras were revealed to be the choice of the manufacturer of the Bayraktar UAV for their drones were pledged by the Trudeau government in late March.

On March 24 it was revealed to a Parliamentary committee that the CAF had barred its active-duty service members from entering the Ukraine Foreign Legion.

Before April 21 Canada had sent 4,500 M-72 rocket launchers and 100 Carl Gustaf anti-tank systems to Ukraine. On April 22 Canada sent from its warehouse of 37 units an unknown number of 155mm M777 Howitzers. On April 26 Canada pledged to send eight Rohsel light armoured vehicles to Ukraine.

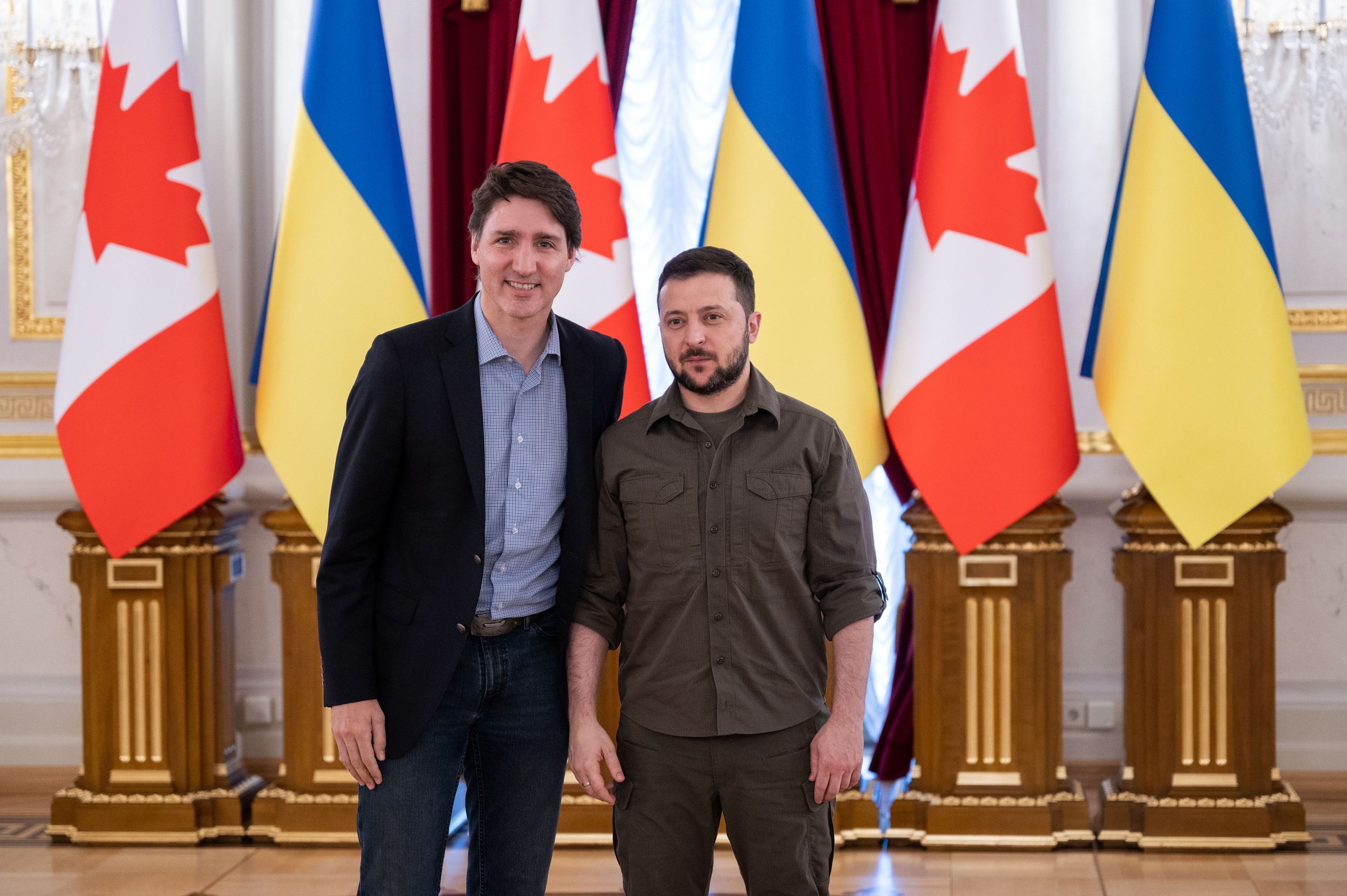
Ukrainian President Volodymyr Zelenskyy and Prime minister Justin Trudeau, May 2022

On May 8, Prime Minister Justin Trudeau made a surprise visit to Kyiv to meet with Ukrainian president Volodymyr Zelenskyy.

On June 8 Foreign Minister Mélanie Joly announced a ban under the SEMRR on the export of 28 services vital for the operation of the oil, gas and chemical industries, including technical, management, accounting and advertising services.

=== United Kingdom ===
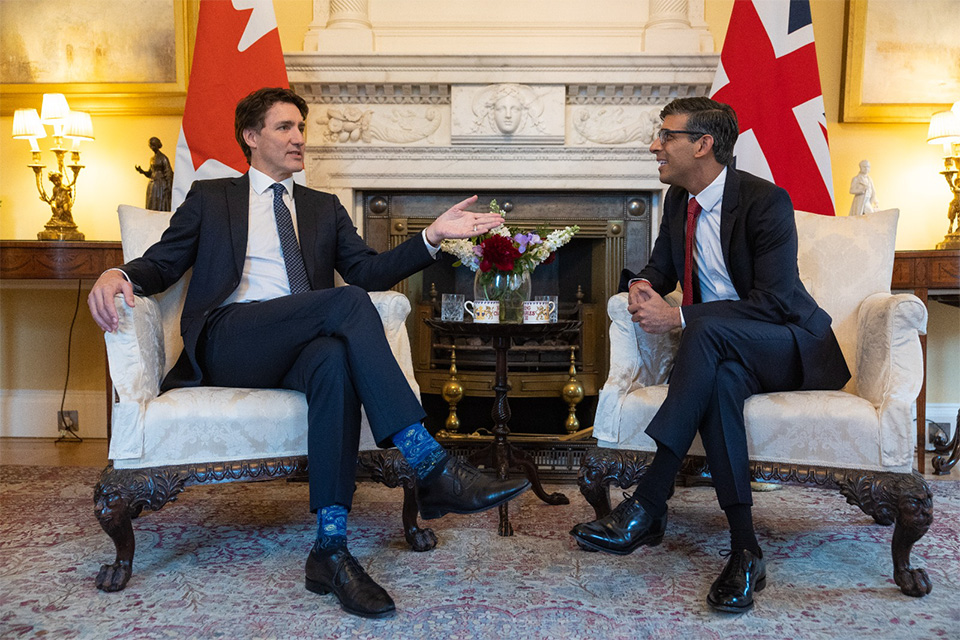
Trudeau with British Prime Minister Rishi Sunak, May 2023

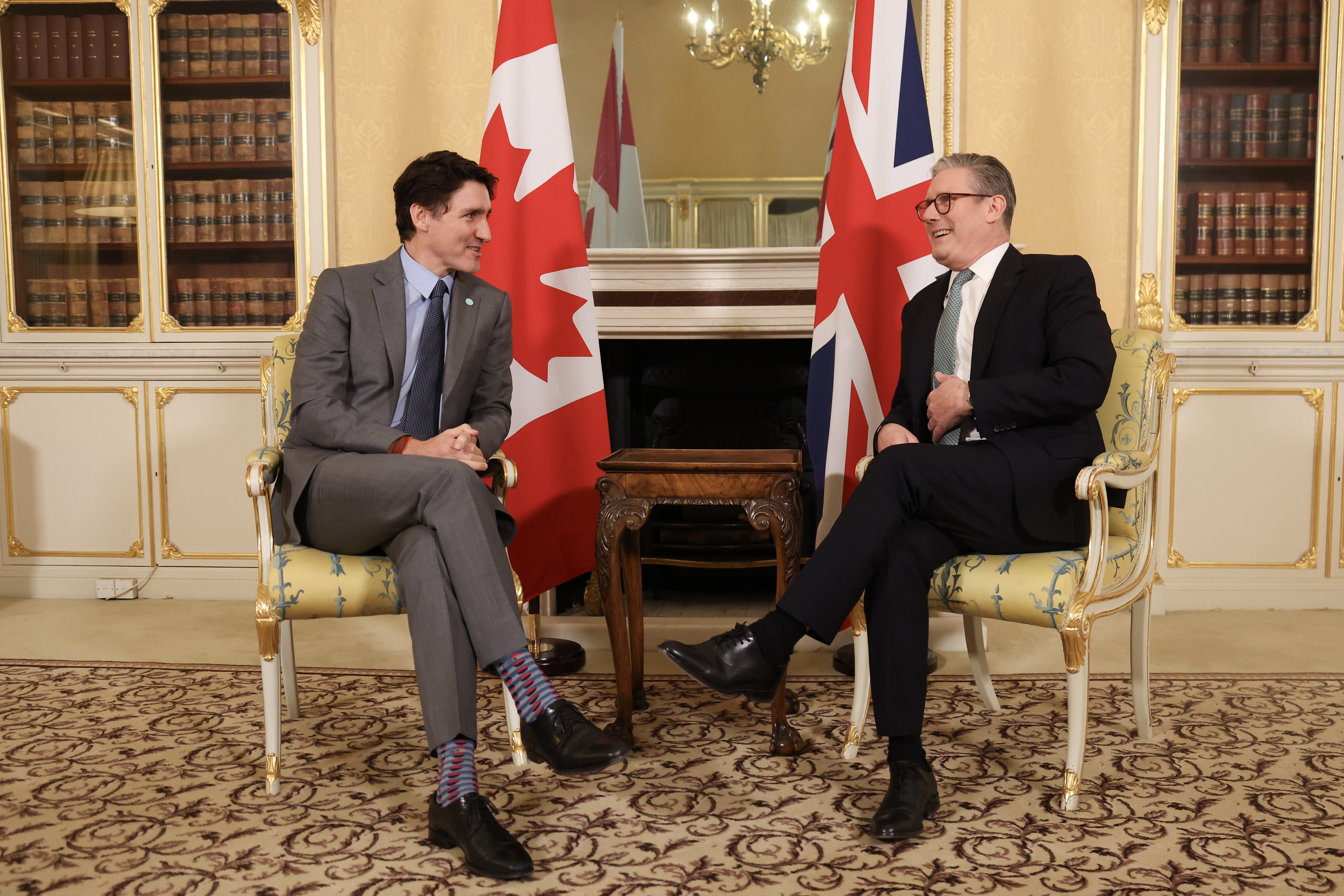
Trudeau with British Prime Minister Keir Starmer, March 2025

The UK left the European Union at the end of January 2020, but continued to participate in the EU's trade agreements during a transition period that ended on December 31, 2020. In November 2020, the UK and Canada signed a continuity agreement in order to apply the terms of the EU-CA agreement to their bilateral trade. On March 24, 2022, Canada and the UK opened negotiations for a deeper and more comprehensive free trade agreement. The negotiations were paused by the UK in January 2023 over disagreements regarding the trade of beef and cheese. In March 2023, the UK concluded negotiations to accede to the free-trading CPTPP of which Canada was already an active member.

== Asia ==
=== China ===
When Trudeau entered office in 2015, Canada had a good relationship with China, and the new Prime minister tried to strengthen Canada's ties with the middle kingdom. In 2016, Trudeau visited China and attended the G-20 summit in Hangzhou where he was affectionately nicknamed Xiao Tudou (小土豆), meaning "little potato" by the Chinese public. Trudeau visited China again in December 2017 to launch trade negotiations. However, relations between the two countries became tense again on the onset China–United States trade war. The turmoil lead to the Arrest of Meng Wanzhou at the Vancouver International Airport in December 2018 at the behest of the United States, and the arrest of Michael Spavor and Michael Kovrig in China 12 days later. As these three individuals were released at the exact same time in September 2021, many observers speculated they were exchanged as part of a deal between the United States and China.

During Justin Trudeau's second term in office, Canada voiced support for the 2019–2020 Hong Kong protests, and called for a U.N investigation into alleged evidence of Uyghur genocide. Meanwhile, China called for an U.N. investigation into the treatment of the indigenous peoples in Canada in the Canadian Indian residential school system, and into human rights abuses against migrants in Canadian detention centers.

=== Taiwan ===
In October 2023, it was announced that Canada and Taiwan has completed negotiations on a foreign investment promotion and protection arrangement.

In 2023, Taiwan became Canada's 15th largest trading partner. Top Canadian exports to Taiwan included financial services, intellectual property, research and development, travel and transport.

In 2024 British Columbia opened a trade office in Taiwan. Called the British Columbia Trade and Investment Representative Office it is located in Taipei.

In April 2024, Canada and Taiwan's representative offices signed a science and research arrangement to enable opportunities for commercial partnerships in high tech sectors.

=== South Korea ===
In May 16–18, 2023, Trudeau travelled to Seoul to meet with President Yoon Suk-yeol. In May 2023, Yoon showed his will to strengthen cooperation with Canada, saying that there is great potential for economic cooperation between South Korea and Canada in the fields of clean energy and future industries including semiconductors, batteries, and artificial intelligence.

In 2023, the two countries began their inaugural high-level economic security dialogue.

=== India ===
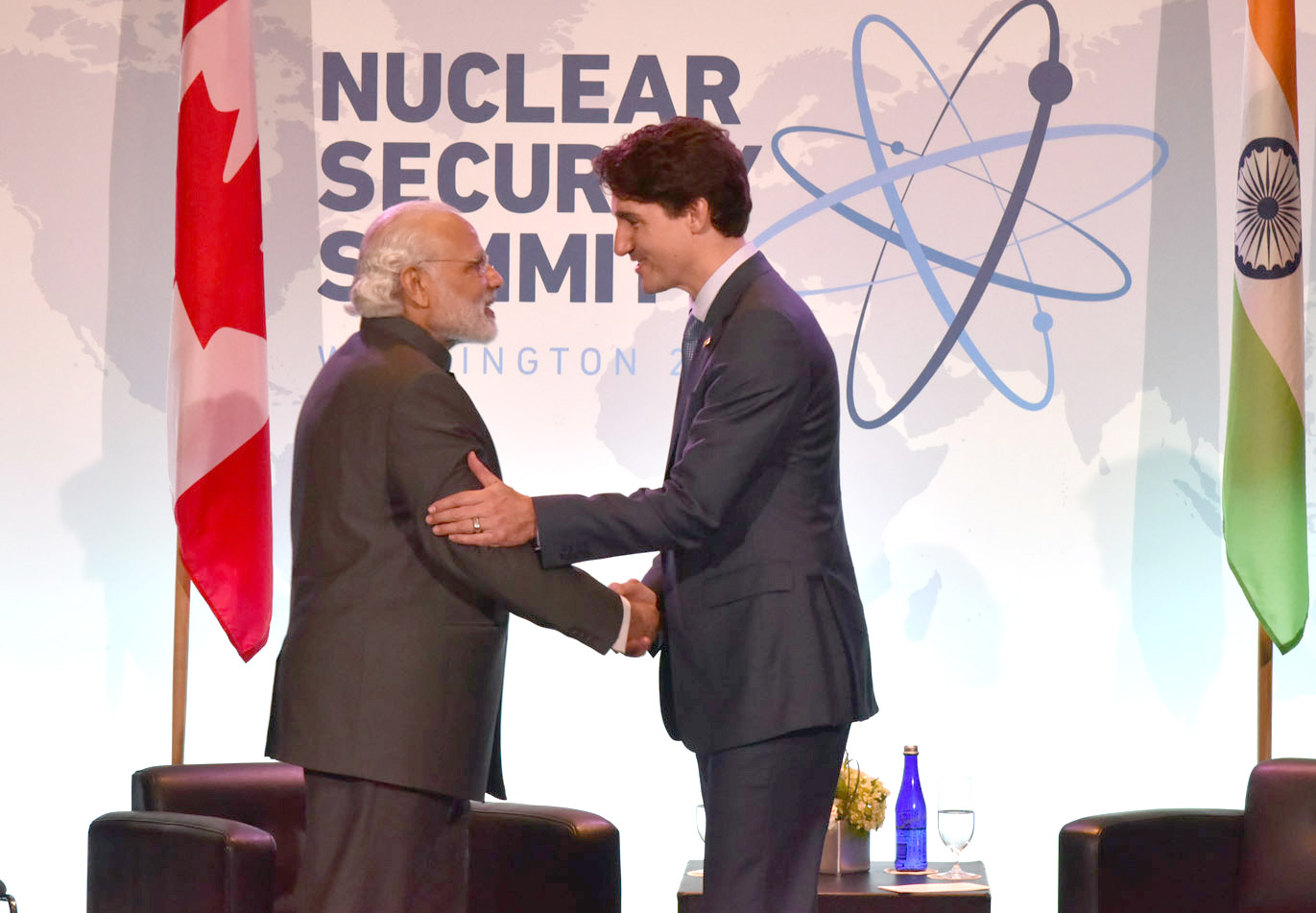
Trudeau and Indian Prime Minister Narendra Modi, Washington D.C., April 1, 2016

Trudeau drew criticism for his trip to India in February 2018, as the official schedule had few business meetings while having numerous photo ops at tourist stops. The BBC wrote that Trudeau was "jet-setting around the country to take part in what appears to be a series of photo ops cunningly designed to showcase his family's elaborate traditional wardrobe". In addition, Liberal MP Randeep Sarai originally invited convicted attempted murderer Jaspal Atwal to an event (Atwal posed with Sophie Gregoire Trudeau at an event in India), although the invite was later rescinded. The Atwal invite controversy also led to fears from Indian prime minister Narendra Modi that Trudeau was appealing to Sikh fundamentalists.

On December 1, 2020, Trudeau expressed concerns about the Indian government's handling of farmer protests. Trudeau stated that "Canada will always there to defend the right of peaceful protestors" and expressed support for "the process of dialogue". Following his remarks, the Government of India summoned Canada's High Commissioner to India, Nadir Patel, to register its protest against Trudeau's comments.

The Canada–India diplomatic row was a diplomatic dispute between Canada and India that started in September 2023, with periodic escalation throughout the following year. While the diplomatic row was initially triggered due to Canadian Prime Minister Justin Trudeau's allegations that the Indian government was involved in the assassination of the militant Hardeep Singh Nijjar, the ongoing tensions between India and Canada have been largely fuelled by disagreements over the Sikh separatist and militant Khalistan movement and its active supporters.

This led to a prolonged diplomatic stand-off between the countries. Both the countries expelled diplomatic staff, claiming interference in the other's internal affairs.

In 2023, both countries expelled members of each other's diplomatic staff and advised their citizens against traveling to the other; Canada closed three consulates in India. In October 2024, Canada expelled Sanjay Kumar Verma, the Indian High Commissioner to Canada, along with five other diplomats. India retaliated with six expulsions of its own.

Leaders of various nations released statements expressing concern on the stand-off. However, under Prime Minister Mark Carney, relations have improved and the two countries have restored diplomatic relations since 2025.

=== Israeli-Palestinian Conflict ===
Trudeau's policy regarding the Israeli–Palestinian conflict was initially a continuation of his predecessor's unwavering support for the state of Israel. In 2015, Trudeau's House of Commons voted for a resolution to condemn the Boycott, Divestment and Sanctions movement. Canada also voted against all resolutions to condemn Israel's violations of Palestinian rights at the United Nations until 2019, when it started to vote for them.

Canada welcomed Trump's peace agreement between Israel and the United Arab Emirates as a positive and historic step towards a peaceful and secure Middle East, adding Canada was gladdened by suspension of Israel's plans to annex parts of the Palestinian territories in the West Bank.

In October 2023, Trudeau condemned the Hamas-led attack on Israel and expressed his support to Israel and its right to self-defence. On October 24, he rejected calls for a ceasefire in the Gaza war but said he supported "humanitarian pauses" to deliver aid to the people of the Gaza Strip. On November 14, Trudeau urged Israel to stop "this killing of women, of children, of babies" and to "exercise maximum restraint" in the Gaza Strip. Israeli prime minister Benjamin Netanyahu rebuked Trudeau on X (formerly known as Twitter) for his remarks. On December 12, in a joint statement with the Prime Minister of Australia and the Prime Minister of New Zealand, Trudeau called for a "sustainable ceasefire" in the war.

Trudeau neither endorsed nor rejected South Africa's genocide case against Israel. Activists criticized Canada's defense trade with Israel and called for a complete arms embargo on Israel. On November 21, 2024, the International Criminal Court (ICC) issued arrest warrants for two senior Israeli officials, Benjamin Netanyahu, the Prime Minister of Israel, and Yoav Gallant, the former Minister of Defense of Israel, Prime Minister Justin Trudeau stated that Canada would "abide" by the International Criminal Court (ICC) investigation in Palestine's issuing of an arrest warrant for Netanyahu if he entered the country.

=== Japan ===
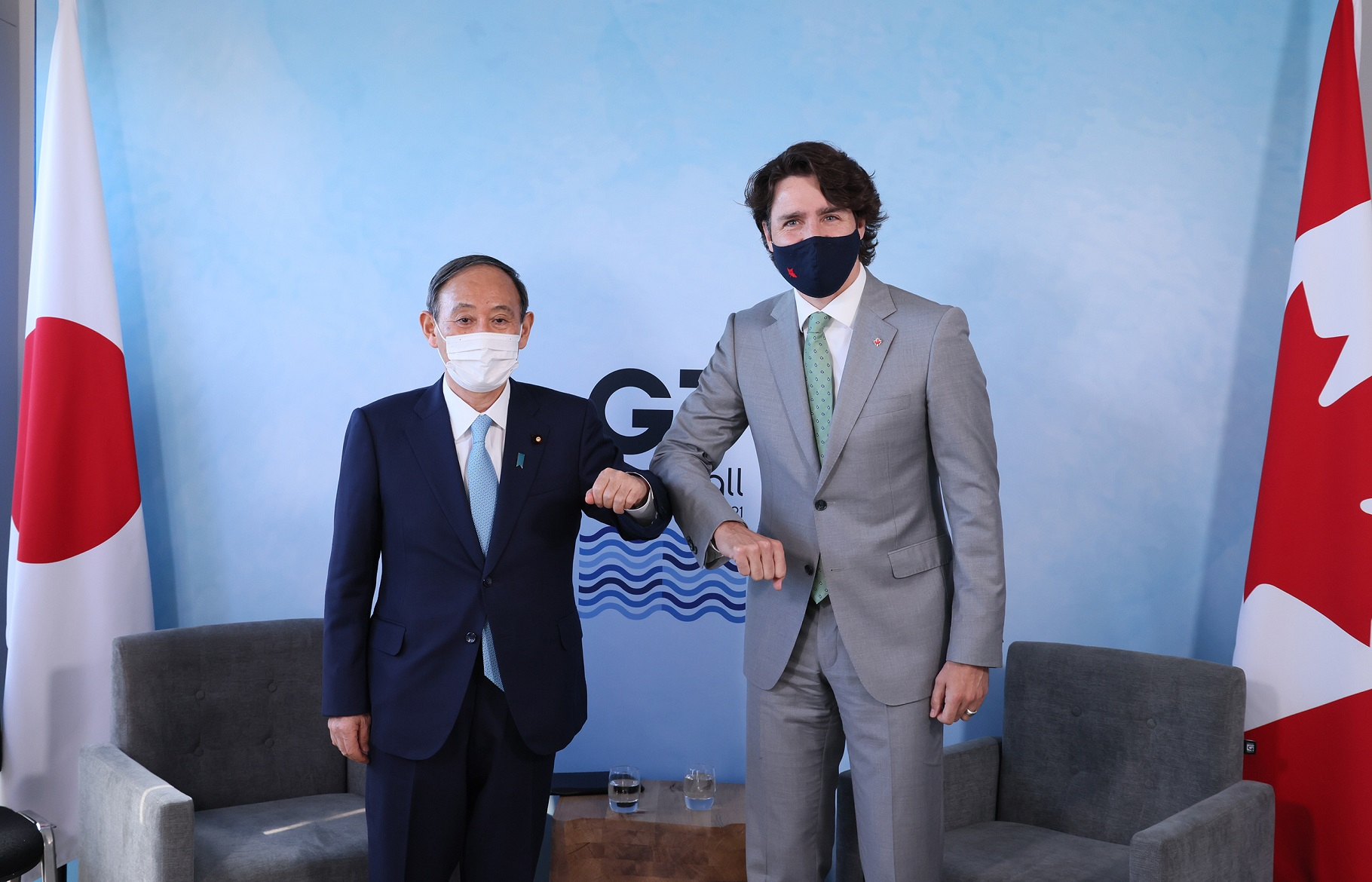
Yoshihide Suga with Canadian Prime Minister Justin Trudeau in June 2021

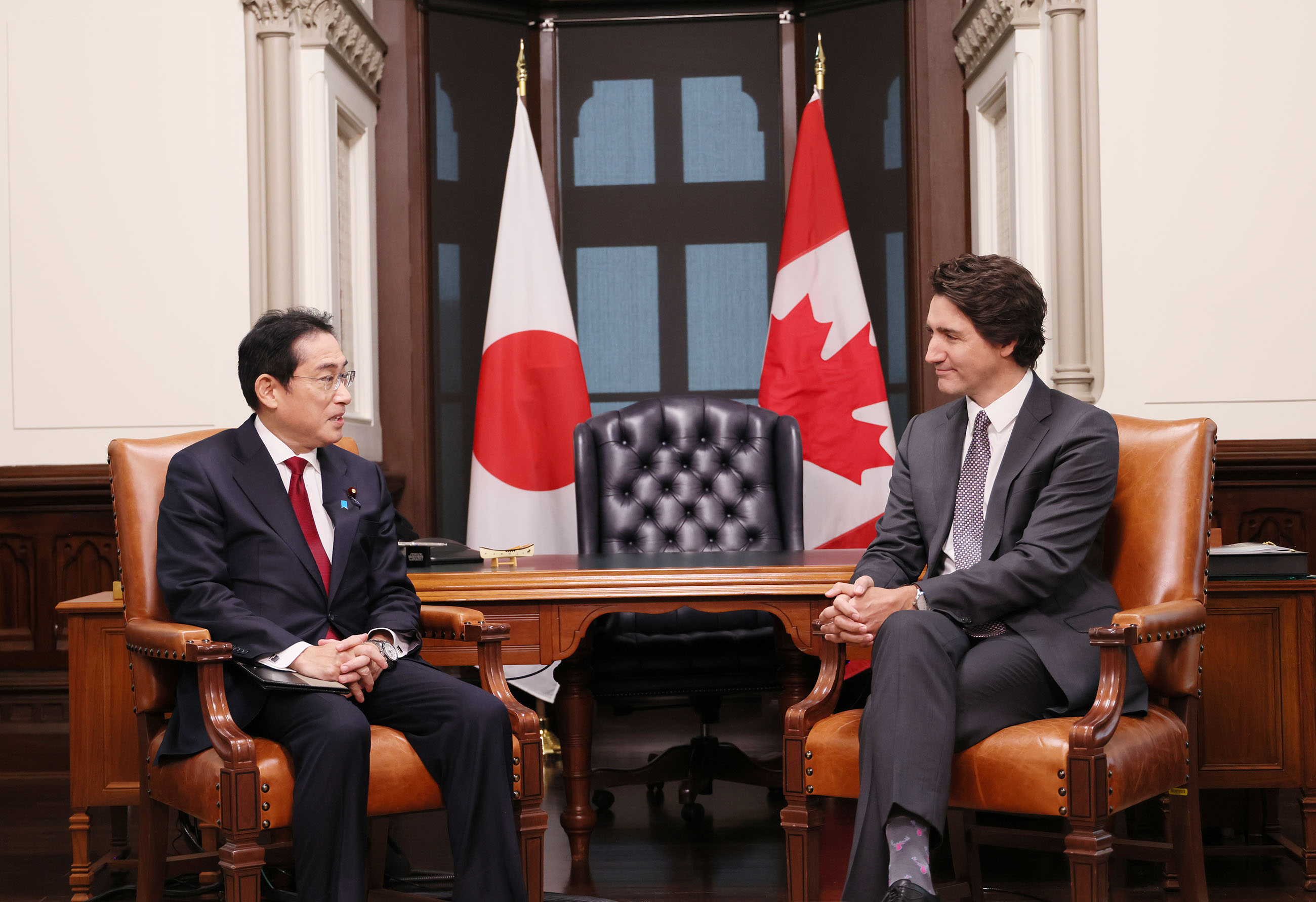
Fumio Kishida meets Canadian Prime Minister Justin Trudeau in Ottawa, January 2023.

Kishida sought on his visit to Canada in January 2023 to partner with what he saw as a resource-rich country but was rebuffed as Prime Minister Justin Trudeau had spent his entire tenure on a quest to "de-carbonize" the Canadian economy and saw political advantage in an excise tax on the substance of life. In September 2023, Japan signed an electric vehicle supply chain agreement and a PMC cooperation with Canada. When the two leaders met on the fringes of the APEC summit in November 2023, among other things they "reiterated their unwavering support for Ukraine in the face of Russia’s illegal and unjustifiable aggression and discussed next steps in providing assistance".

=== Myanmar ===
Foreign affairs minister Freeland condemned the persecution of Rohingya Muslims in Myanmar. She said the violence against the Rohingya "looks a lot like ethnic cleansing and that is not acceptable". Canada subsequently stripped Myanmar leader Aung San Suu Kyi of her honorary Canadian citizenship.

Following the 2021 Myanmar coup d'état, the Government of Canada condemned the violence perpetrated by the Tatmadaw against journalists and civilians protesting the coup. Canada's official declaration on the issue expresses "support the people of Myanmar in their quest for democracy, freedom, peace and prosperity".

=== Philippines ===
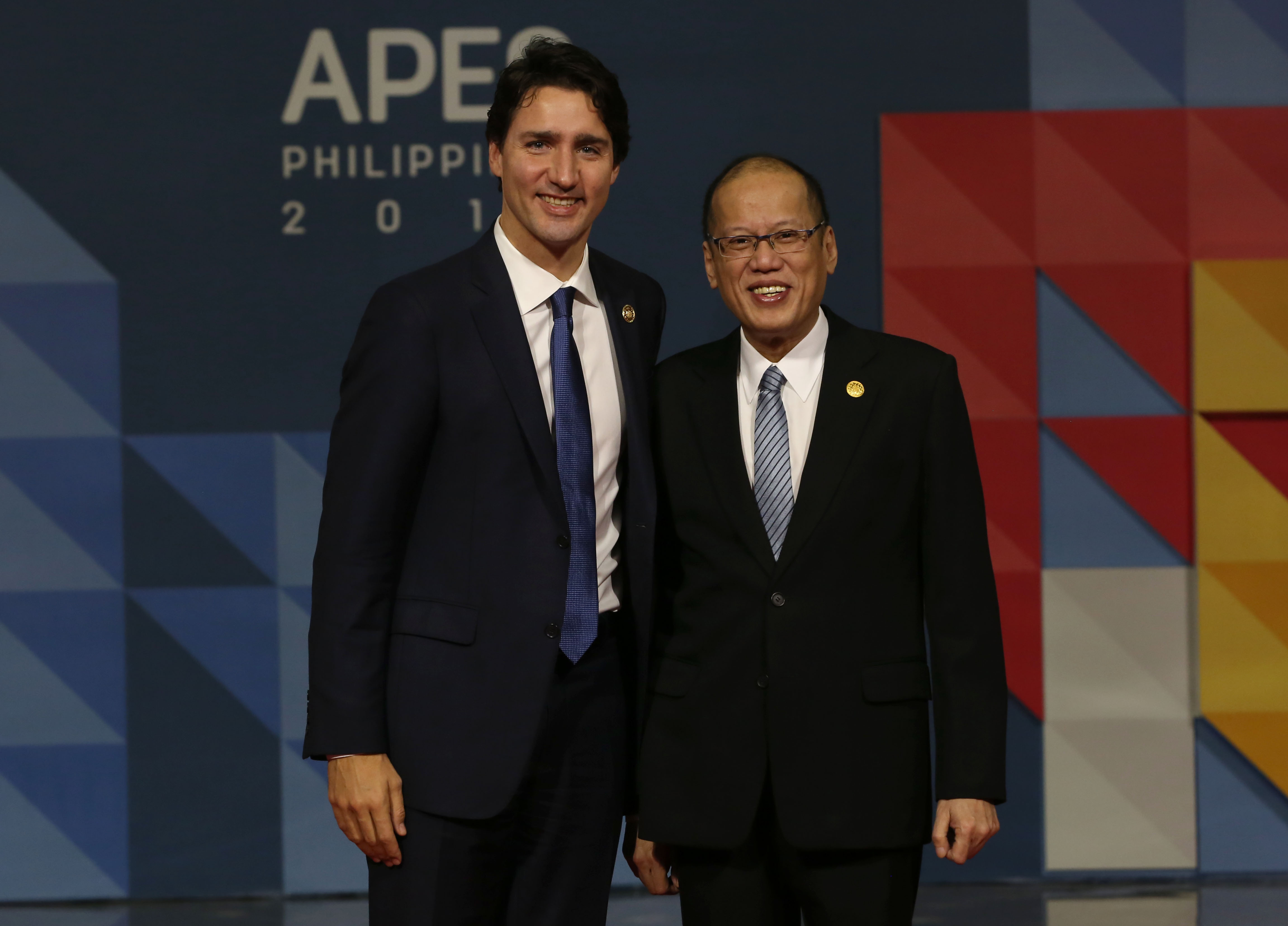
Justin Trudeau and Philippine President Benigno Aquino III at the APEC 2015 summit in Manila.

Justin Trudeau was Prime Minister during the most tense period of the Canada–Philippines waste dispute, an international row over mislabeled Canadian garbage shipped to Manila by a recycling company. The dispute started when 103 shipping containers left Vancouver in 2013–14 with what was labeled as recyclable plastics; but they instead contained household waste. Trudeau initially tried to convince the Philippines to dispose of the waste themselves, without success. In November 2017, Trudeau promised to solve the issue, but he did nothing until April 2019, when Philippine President Rodrigo Duterte sent an ultimatum to Canada to bring their trash home. On May 30, 2019, 69 containers of Canadian trash began their trip home.

==== Military relations ====
In March 2025, the Philippines and Canada announced plans to sign a Status of Visiting Forces Agreement to enhance defence cooperation and interoperability.

=== Saudi Arabia ===
One of Justin Trudeau 'first foreign policy statements included a call to diffuse Sunni-Shiite tensions in the aftermath of Nimr al-Nimr's execution in Saudi Arabia.

After taking office, Trudeau was urged by Human Rights groups to stop the $15 billion arms deal with Saudi Arabia – believed to be the largest arms sale in Canadian history. Human rights and arms control groups have repeatedly called upon Trudeau to halt the deal in light of Saudi Arabia's poor human rights record and the humanitarian crisis associated with the Saudi Arabian-led intervention in Yemen. Trudeau said he would abide by the deal negotiated by the previous administration as "a matter of principle", and that "It's important that people know that when they sign a deal with Canada, a change of government isn't going to lead to the contract being ripped up." In 2016, Trudeau's government approved export permits for the shipment of most of Canadian-made LAV III combat vehicles to Saudi Arabia under the deal, which is valued at $11.3 billion

In August 2018, Canada called for the immediate release of Saudi blogger Raif Badawi and his sister Samar. In response to Canada's criticism, Saudi Arabia expelled Canada's ambassador, and froze trade with Canada. Trudeau said that Canada will "continue to speak clearly and firmly on issues of human rights at home and abroad wherever we see the need".

In October 2018, Trudeau condemned the killing of Saudi dissident journalist Jamal Khashoggi at the Saudi consulate in Istanbul, promised "consequences"; later that month, following Khashoggi's killing and the continuation of the war in Yemen, Trudeau announced that his government was suspending the issuance of new arms export permits to Saudi Arabia pending a review. Despite this moratorium, Canada doubled its weapons sales to Saudi Arabia to $3.3 billion Canadian dollars in 2019.

In January 2019, at the request of the Office of the United Nations High Commissioner for Refugees, Canada granted asylum to 18-year-old Saudi teenager Rahaf Mohammed, who was fleeing her abusive family in Kuwait; Freeland personally greeted Mohammed at Toronto Pearson International Airport.

=== Yemen ===
In 2021, the Minister of International Development pledged a $69.9 million worth of humanitarian aid to Yemen.

== Oceania ==
=== Australia ===
In December 2017, Australian Defence Minister Marise Payne announced that eighteen F/A-18A Hornet aircraft would be sold to Canada after officials cancelled an F/A-18F Super Hornet order from the United States. The first two aircraft are expected to be handed over to the Royal Canadian Air Force in early 2019.
