= Sema (disambiguation) =

Sema or SEMA may refer to:

== Government ==
- Special Economic Measures Act, Canadian law used to sanction other countries

== Organizations ==
- Sema Group, an Anglo-French IT services company
- SEMA (association), Specialty Equipment Market Association for vehicles in the United States
- Seoul Museum of Arts, a museum located in Seoul, South Korea
- Storage Equipment Manufacturers Association, a professional association of storage equipment manufacturers in the United Kingdom

== People ==
- Sema (tribe), an Indian Naga tribe

Given name

- Sema Apak (born 1985), Turkish female sprinter
- Arzu Sema Canbul (born 1973), Turkish female footballer

Surname

- Ken Sema (born 1993), Swedish footballer for English Premier League side Watford F.C.
- Maic Sema (born 1988), Swedish footballer for GIF Sundsvall

== Places ==
- The ICAO airport code for José María Velasco Ibarra Airport in Macará, Ecuador

== Religion ==
- Sema, a Sufi ritual
- Bai Sema or Sema stone, boundary stones surrounding the ordination halls of Buddhist temples in Thailand

== Science ==
- The seema or the masu salmon (Oncorhynchus masou), a species of fish
- Sema domain, a protein domain

== See also ==
- SEMATECH (Semiconductor Manufacturing Technology Consortium)
- Cima (disambiguation)
- Sima (disambiguation)
- Seema (disambiguation)
- Simi (disambiguation)
