= Semer =

Semer may refer to:

== Places ==
- Semer, Suffolk, England
- Semer, Kızılcahamam, Turkey

== People ==
- John Semer Farnsworth (1893–1952), American navy officer
- Milton Semer (1919–2016), American lawyer

== See also ==
- Seamer (disambiguation)
