= Cima =

Cima may refer to:

== Acronyms ==
- The Center for International Media Assistance, a media development organization in Washington, DC
- Center for Italian Modern Art
- Centre International de la Mécanique d'Art (International centre for Art Mechanics), a museum in Switzerland
- Channel Industries Mutual Aid, a Houston emergency response organization
- Chartered Institute of Management Accountants (formed 1919)
- Costruzione Italiana Macchine Attrezzi (Italian Machine Tool Company), the gear and transmission manufacturing subsidiary of Coesia
- Chenille International Manufacturers Association

== People ==
- Cima da Conegliano (about 1459 – 1517), Italian renaissance painter
- Cima (wrestler) (born 1977), ring name of Japanese professional wrestler Nobuhiko Oshima

== Locations ==
- Estádio Ítalo del Cima (inaugurated 1960), football stadium in Campo Grande neighborhood, Rio de Janeiro, Brazil
- Fajã de Cima, parish in the district of Ponta Delgada in the Azores
- Ilhéu de Cima, islet in the Cape Verde Islands
- Cima, California, United States

== Other ==
- CIMA: The Enemy, console role-playing game
- Cima Garahau, character in the fictional Universal Century timeline of the Japanese Mobile Suit Gundam science fiction franchise
- Nissan Cima (launched 1988), automobile manufactured by Nissan
- CIMA (AM), a defunct radio station (1040 AM) located in Vancouver, British Columbia, Canada
- Cima (gastropod), a genus of marine snails in the family Cimidae

== See also ==
- Chima (disambiguation)
- Cima (surname)
- Seema (disambiguation)
- Sema (disambiguation)
- Sima (disambiguation)
