= Sima (surname) =

Sima is a surname. Notable people with the surname include:

- Gabriela Sima (1955–2016), Austrian opera singer
- Hans Sima (1918–2006), Austrian politician
- Horia Sima (1906–1993), Romanian fascist politician
- Jonas Sima (born 1937), Swedish filmmaker, journalist, writer and educator
- Josef Šíma (1891–1971), Czech painter
- Michel Sima (1912–1987), photographer and sculptor
- Oskar Sima (1896–1969), Austrian actor
- Raymond Ndong Sima, prime minister of Gabon
- Viorel Sima (born 1950), Romanian footballer

== See also ==
- Sima (Chinese surname)
- Sima (disambiguation)
