= Michael Cima =

American materials scientist and engineer

Michael J. Cima is an American materials scientist and engineer and the David H. Koch Professor at Massachusetts Institute of Technology

Cima was elected a member of the National Academy of Engineering in 2011 for innovations in rapid prototyping, high-temperature superconductors, and biomedical device technology.

His current research focuses on nano-based drugs, detection and monitoring, and personalized medicine.

Cima earned a B.S. in chemistry in 1982 (Phi Beta Kappa) and a Ph.D. in chemical engineering in 1986, both from the University of California, Berkeley.
