= Seema =

Seema may refer to:

== Films ==
- Seema (1955 film), a Bollywood film
- Seema (1963 film), a Pakistani film
- Seema (1971 film), a Bollywood film

== People ==
- Seema (given name), an Indian feminine name used in South Asia
  - Seema (actress) (born 1951), Indian actress
  - Seema (Meitei actress) (1970–2011), Indian actress
  - Seema (runner) (born 2001), Indian long-distance runner
- Lehlohonolo Seema (born 1980), football (soccer) player from Lesotho
- Seema Aissen Weatherwax (1905–2006), Ukrainian-born American photographer

== Other uses ==
- Seema or masu salmon, Oncorhynchus masou, a species of fish from Eastern Asia

== See also ==
- Sema (disambiguation)
- Sima (disambiguation)
- Cima (disambiguation)
