= Sima (footballer) =

Brazilian footballer

Personal information
- Full name: Simão Teles Bacelar
- Date of birth: 7 March 1948 (age 78)
- Place of birth: Miguel Alves, Piauí, Brazil
- Height: 1.70 m (5 ft 7 in)
- Position: Forward

Senior career*
Years	Team	Apps	(Gls)
1966–1971	Piauí		
1969	→ Sport Recife (loan)		
1970	→ Moto Club (loan)		
1971	→ Moto Club (loan)		
1971–1972	Bahia		
1973–1975	Tiradentes-PI		
1976	Rio Negro-AM		
1977–1981	Ríver		
1980	→ Leônico (loan)		
1981	Ferroviário-CE		
1982	Ríver		
1982	Flamengo-PI		
1982	Sergipe		
1983	Ríver		
1983–1984	Auto Esporte-PI		
1984–1986	Piauí		
1987	Ríver		
- * Club domestic league appearances and goals as of 7 November 2025

Simão Teles Bacelar (born 7 March 1948), better known as Sima, is a Brazilian former professional footballer who played as forward.

== Career ==
Born in Miguel Alves, the slender boy called Sima began to stand out in the state's intermunicipal tournaments, becoming the top scorer. He made his professional debut for Piauí EC in 1966 and from then on made history in the state's football, winning 10 state titles and being the top scorer on 11 occasions, with more than 265 goals scored. He earned the nickname "Pelé of the Northeast".

== Honours ==
Piauí

- Campeonato Piauiense: 1967, 1968, 1969, 1985
- Taça Estado do Piauí: 1968

Tiradentes

- Campeonato Piauiense: 1974, 1975

Ríver

- Campeonato Piauiense: 1977, 1978, 1980

Sergipe

- Campeonato Sergipano: 1982

Auto Esporte

- Campeonato Piauiense: 1983

Individual

- Campeonato Piauiense top scorer (11): 1968, 1969, 1970, 1971, 1974, 1975, 1977, 1978, 1979, 1983, 1987
