= Sima (given name) =

- Pronunciation: See-ma
- Gender: Female

Origin
- Origin: Arabic, Sanskrit
- Meaning: Face
- Region of origin: Indus Valley, Arabian Peninsula

Sima is a feminine given name in mostly Arabic, Aramaic, Hebrew Sanskrit, Persian and Turkish. Derived from the Arabic Sima'a (Arabic: سيماء), which means "sign," "characteristic," "appearance," "look," or "countenance".In Persian and Turkish it means face (and a beautiful face by implication). In India, it is usually transcribed “Seema” and also a feminine name. The meaning in Hindi is boundary. It is also a Greek and a Hebrew name. Among Jewish communities, the name Sima (סִימָה) can be from Hebrew and Aramaic, where it means treasure or precious, or as a nickname for someone named Simcha.

Notable people with one of these names:

- Sima Sami Bahous (born 1956), Jordanian Executive Director of UN Women
- Sima Bina (born 1945), Iranian musician
- Sima Abd Rabo (born 1976), Syrian activist
- Sima Samar (born 1957), Afghan political figure
- Sima Katić (d. 1832), Serbian revolutionary
- Sima Suso (born 2005), German footballer
