= Seaming =

Seaming may refer to:

- Seam types
- Seaming (metalworking), a metalworking process that creates a seam along an edge of sheet metal
