= Special Economic Measures Act =

Act of the Parliament of Canada

Parliament of Canada
- Long title: An Act to provide for the imposition of special economic measures
- Citation: Special Economic Measures Act (S.C. 1992, c. 17), last amended on 2023-06-22
- Enacted by: 33rd Canadian Parliament
- Assented to: 1992

The Special Economic Measures Act (French: Loi sur les mesures économiques spéciales) (S.C. 1992, c. 17) is a statute of the Parliament of Canada, passed in 1992 under the second Mulroney ministry in the 34th Canadian Parliament. The Government of Canada department responsible for enforcing the Act is the Minister of Foreign Affairs.

== History ==
In 2011 the Special Economic Measures (Syria) Regulations (SOR/2011-114) were passed.

In 2014 an Iranian plaintiff tried to have the Supreme Court of British Columbia overturn the Special Economic Measures (Iran) Regulations. They had been adopted in 2010, on the recommendation of United Nations Security Council (UNSC) Resolution 1737.

The Special Economic Measures (Ukraine) Regulations (SOR/2014-60) and the Special Economic Measures (Russia) Regulations, (SOR/2014-58) were passed, to the frustration of one Mr Portnov, who had formerly been employed in the Ukrainian administration headed by Viktor Yanukovych.

Upper-level management of the Iranian nuclear programme have repeatedly tried to infiltrate Canada and the SEMA has been used to stop them.

In September 2017 the Special Economic Measures (Venezuela) Regulations (SOR/2017-204) were passed.

On 1 February 2022 rumours of a Russian invasion were thick and a helpful list of Canadian sanctions tools was provided by consultant attorneys. There were then three pieces of secondary legislation that collectively formed the "Sanctions Regime", under the SEMA:

- Special Economic Measures (Russia) Regulations (SEMRR)
- Special Economic Measures (Ukraine) Regulations (SEMUR)
- Freezing Assets of Corrupt Foreign Officials (Ukraine) Regulations (FACFOUR)

In 2022, Roman Abramovich had some of his assets seized under this Act.
