= Simi =

Simi may refer to:

== Places ==
=== Greece ===
- Symi, also transliterated as Simi, a Greek island

=== California, United States ===
- Rancho Simi, a 1795 Spanish land grant
- Simi Valley
- Simi Hills, a mountain range
  - Simi Peak
- Arroyo Simi, sometimes called Simi Creek

== People ==
=== Given name ===
- Simi Bedford (fl. 1991–2007), Nigerian novelist based in Britain
- Simi Chahal (born 1992), Indian actress
- Simi Fehoko (born 1997), American football player
- Simi Garewal (born 1947), Indian actress
- Simi Hamilton (born 1987), American cross-country skier
- Simi Linton (born 1947), American author, consultant, and public speaker
- Seemi Raheel (born 1957), Pakistani senior actress working in Urdu television
- Simi Sara (active 2010), Canadian radio and television broadcaster
- Simi Sernaker (born 1979), American frontwoman of the rock band Suffrajett

=== Surname ===
- Carlo Simi (1924–2000), Italian architect, production designer and costume designer
- Filadelfo Simi (1849–1923), Italian painter and sculptor
- Leandro Simi (born 1977), Brazilian futsal player
- Nerina Simi (1890-1987), Italian artist and a teacher of painting and drawing

=== Nicknames ===
- Dr. Simi, a Mexican mascot
  - Also the nickname of Mexican politician Víctor González Torres (born 1947)
- Simi (singer), (born 1988), Nigerian singer and songwriter

=== Fictional characters ===
- Simi, protagonist of the young adult fantasy novel Skin of the Sea by Natasha Bowen
- Simi Roy, antagonist of the 2005 Indian film Kalyug, portrayed by Amrita Singh

== Languages ==
- Runa Simi, a Quechuan language family
- Simi or Sema language, spoken in Nagaland, India

== Other uses ==
- Simi Sinha, a fictional character in the 2018 Indian film Andhadhun, played by Tabu
- Simi Winery, in Ventura County, California, U.S.
- Actenodes simi, a species of metallic wood-boring beetle in the family Buprestidae
- Pleocoma simi, a species of rain beetle in the family Pleocomidae
- Simi (mixtape), 2018, by U.S. rapper BlocBoy JB
- Simi (weapon), an African short sword
- Students Islamic Movement of India, a banned Islamist student organisation formed in 1977

== See also ==
- Arroyo Simi Overhead, a bridge for State Route 118 in California, U.S.
- Seemi, a given name or surname
- Simmie (disambiguation)
- Sema (disambiguation)
- Simran (disambiguation), Indian given name, shortened to Simi
