= Seemi =

Seemi is both a given name and a surname. It may refer to:

- Farhat Seemi, Pakistani politician, Member of the Provincial Assembly of Sindh
- Seemi Aizdi, Pakistani politician and the member-elect of the Senate of Pakistan
- Seemi Pasha, Pakistani film and television actress
- Seemi Raheel, Pakistani senior actress working in Urdu television

== See also ==
- Simi (disambiguation)
- Symi
