= Diakidis =

Diakidis is a surname. Notable people with the surname include:

- Themistoklis Diakidis (1882–1944), Greek athlete
- Ioannis Diakidis (1867–1962), Greek writer
