= Actenodes mendax =

Scientific classification
- Domain: Eukaryota
- Kingdom: Animalia
- Phylum: Arthropoda
- Class: Insecta
- Order: Coleoptera
- Suborder: Polyphaga
- Infraorder: Elateriformia
- Family: Buprestidae
- Genus: Actenodes
- Species: A. mendax

Binomial name
- Actenodes mendax Horn, 1891

Species of beetle

Actenodes mendax is a species of metallic wood-boring beetle in the family Buprestidae. It is found in North America.

== See also ==
- Actenodes
