= Simmie =

Simmie or Simmy is a given name and a place name. Notable people and places with this name include:

== People ==
- Simmie Cobbs Jr. (born 1995), American football player
- Simeon Blind Simmie Dooley (1881–1961), American country blues singer and guitarist
- Simmie Hill (1946–2013), American basketball player
- Simmie Knox (born 1935), American painter
- Simeon Simmy Murch (1880–1939), American baseball player
- Neil Simpson (born 1961), Scottish footballer nicknamed "Simmie"
- Simmy Simmons, the female lead character in the 1933 film The Women in His Life
- Sigmar Vilhjálmsson (born 1977), Icelandic television host nicknamed "Simmi"
- Simmy, South African singer-songwriter

== Places ==
- Simmie, Queensland, a locality in the Maranoa Region, Australia
- Simmie, Saskatchewan, a hamlet in Canada
- Simmy Island, a townland in Killyleagh, Northern Ireland

== See also ==
- Simi (disambiguation)
