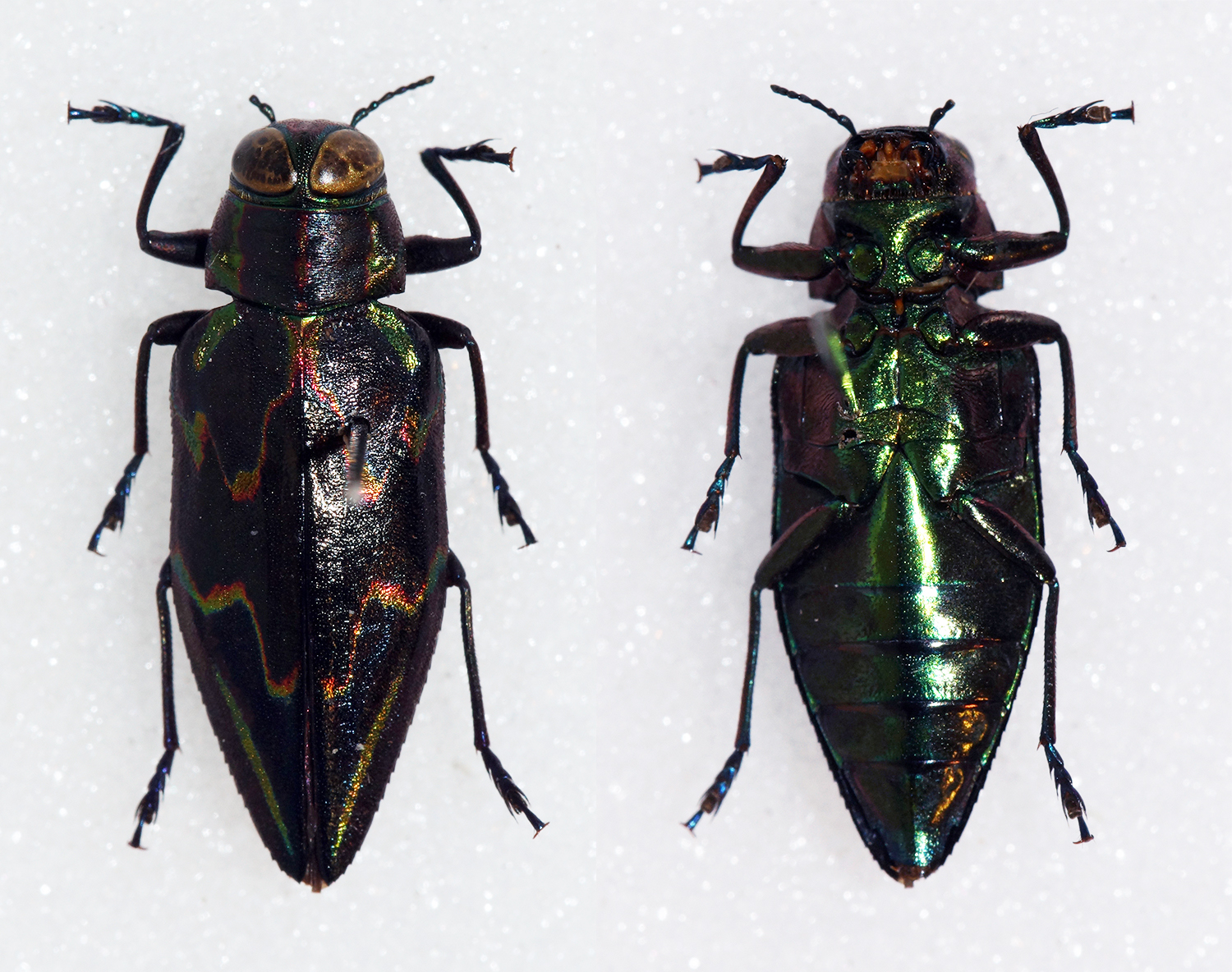
- Actenodes nobilis

Scientific classification
- Kingdom: Animalia
- Phylum: Arthropoda
- Class: Insecta
- Order: Coleoptera
- Suborder: Polyphaga
- Infraorder: Elateriformia
- Family: Buprestidae
- Tribe: Actenodini
- Genus: Actenodes; Dejean, 1833

= Actenodes =

Genus of beetles

Actenodes is a genus of beetles in the family Buprestidae, containing the following species:

- Actenodes acornis (Say, 1833)
- Actenodes acuminipennis (Gory, 1841)
- Actenodes admirabilis Obenberger, 1932
- Actenodes adonis (Gory & Laporte, 1837)
- Actenodes aeneus (Gory, 1841)
- Actenodes africanus Obenberger, 1922
- Actenodes albifrons Théry, 1905
- Actenodes alluaudi Kerremans, 1894
- Actenodes amazonicus Kerremans, 1897
- Actenodes aphrodite Bleuzen, 1989
- Actenodes arizonicus Knull, 1927
- Actenodes auronotatus (Gory & Laporte, 1837)
- Actenodes bellulus (Mannerheim, 1837)
- Actenodes biarti Bleuzen, 1989
- Actenodes bifasciatus Waterhouse, 1882
- Actenodes bourgini Descarpentries, 1950
- Actenodes brasiliensis Bleuzen, 1989
- Actenodes buquetii (Gory, 1841)
- Actenodes calcaratus (Chevrolat, 1835)
- Actenodes caray Zayas, 1988
- Actenodes chalybaeitarsis (Chevrolat, 1834)
- Actenodes circumdatus (Gory, 1841)
- Actenodes congolanus Kerremans, 1898
- Actenodes costipennis (Gory & Laporte, 1837)
- Actenodes curvipes (Gory, 1841)
- Actenodes davidi Nelson, 1979
- Actenodes delagoanus Obenberger, 1928
- Actenodes dilatatus (Gory, 1841)
- Actenodes durantonorum Bleuzen, 1989
- Actenodes embrikstrandi Obenberger, 1936
- Actenodes flexicaulis Schaeffer, 1904
- Actenodes florencae Bleuzen, 1989
- Actenodes frater Théry, 1905
- Actenodes fulminatus (Schönherr, 1817)
- Actenodes gabonicus Thomson, 1858
- Actenodes garieppi Bleuzen, 1989
- Actenodes goryi (Mannerheim, 1837)
- Actenodes griveaudi Descarpentries, 1958
- Actenodes hahneli Bleuzen, 1989
- Actenodes hermes Bleuzen, 1989
- Actenodes heros Théry, 1923
- Actenodes hilari (Gory & Laporte, 1837)
- Actenodes hopfneri (Gory, 1841)
- Actenodes humeralis Waterhouse, 1882
- Actenodes insignis (Gory, 1841)
- Actenodes intermedia (Gory & Laporte, 1837)
- Actenodes krantzi Kerremans, 1911
- Actenodes laevifrons Waterhouse, 1882
- Actenodes lemoulti Théry, 1912
- Actenodes lestradei Bleuzen, 1989
- Actenodes lukuledianus Obenberger, 1928
- Actenodes manni Fisher, 1925
- Actenodes marmoratus (Gory & Laporte, 1837)
- Actenodes mars Bleuzen, 1989
- Actenodes mathani Bleuzen, 1989
- Actenodes mendax Horn, 1891
- Actenodes metallicus Waterhouse, 1889
- Actenodes milloti Descarpentries, 1950
- Actenodes mimicus Knull, 1964
- Actenodes minutus Bleuzen, 1989
- Actenodes miribellus Hoscheck, 1927
- Actenodes mniszechi Bleuzen, 1989
- Actenodes mokrzeckii Obenberger, 1928
- Actenodes montezumus Obenberger, 1918
- Actenodes muhlei Bleuzen, 1989
- Actenodes nevermanni Théry, 1934
- Actenodes nigritus Théry, 1925
- Actenodes nigroviridis Cobos, 1990
- Actenodes nobilis (Linnaeus, 1758)
- Actenodes oberthuri Bleuzen, 1989
- Actenodes obscuripennis (Gory & Laporte, 1837)
- Actenodes ornaticollis Kerremans, 1893
- Actenodes orvoeni Bleuzen, 1989
- Actenodes parvicollis Kerremans, 1897
- Actenodes pauliani Descarpentries, 1958
- Actenodes peyrierasi Descarpentries, 1966
- Actenodes purpureus Théry, 1925
- Actenodes pyropygus Fairmaire, 1903
- Actenodes regularis (Gory & Laporte, 1837)
- Actenodes reichei Thomson, 1878
- Actenodes rugofrontalis Bleuzen, 1989
- Actenodes sallei Thomson, 1878
- Actenodes scabriusculus Quedenfeldt, 1886
- Actenodes signatus (Gory & Laporte, 1837)
- Actenodes simi Fisher, 1940
- Actenodes solisi Barries, 2007
- Actenodes staudingeri Bleuzen, 1989
- Actenodes strandi Obenberger, 1922
- Actenodes subobscurus Bleuzen, 1989
- Actenodes undulatus Waterhouse, 1882
- Actenodes uniformis Théry, 1905
- Actenodes venus Bleuzen, 1989
- Actenodes versicolor (Gory & Laporte, 1837)
- Actenodes viettei Descarpentries, 1955
- Actenodes vilhenai Descarpentries, 1960
- Actenodes violaceovirescens Cobos, 1990
- Actenodes viossati Descarpentries, 1974
- Actenodes viridicollis Kerremans, 1897
