= Actenodes mimicus =

Scientific classification
- Domain: Eukaryota
- Kingdom: Animalia
- Phylum: Arthropoda
- Class: Insecta
- Order: Coleoptera
- Suborder: Polyphaga
- Infraorder: Elateriformia
- Family: Buprestidae
- Genus: Actenodes
- Species: A. mimicus

Binomial name
- Actenodes mimicus Knull, 1964

Species of beetle

Actenodes mimicus is a species of metallic wood-boring beetle in the family Buprestidae. It is found in North America.

== See also ==
- Actenodes
