= Simran (disambiguation) =

Simran is a Punjabi word derived from Sanskrit, स्मरण (smaraṇa, "the act of remembrance, remembrance, reminiscence, recollection"). As a female first name, it may also refer to:

== People ==
- Simran (actress) (born 1976), Indian actress
- Simran Choudhary, Indian actress
- Simranjeet Kaur, Indian archer
- Simranjeet Singh, Indian field hockey player
- Simran Jeet Singh (born 1984), Indian-American educator, writer, and activist
- Simran Judge, Indian-American actor
- Simran Kaur Hundal, Indian television actress
- Simran Kaur Mundi (born 1988), Indian model and actress
- Simran Natekar (born 1997), Indian actress
- Simran Pareenja (born 1996), Indian television actress
- Simran Singh or Prabhsimran Singh (born 2000), Indian cricketer

== Other uses ==
- Simran (film), 2017 Indian film starring Kangana Ranaut
- Simran, fictional character portrayed by Ranaut in the 2006 Indian film Gangster
- Simran Singh, fictional character portrayed by Kajol in the 1995 Indian film Dilwale Dulhania Le Jayenge

== See also ==
- Simi (disambiguation), hypocorism of Simran
