= Ano Symi =

Town in Symi, Greece

Coordinates: 36°36′49.93″N 27°50′15.79″E

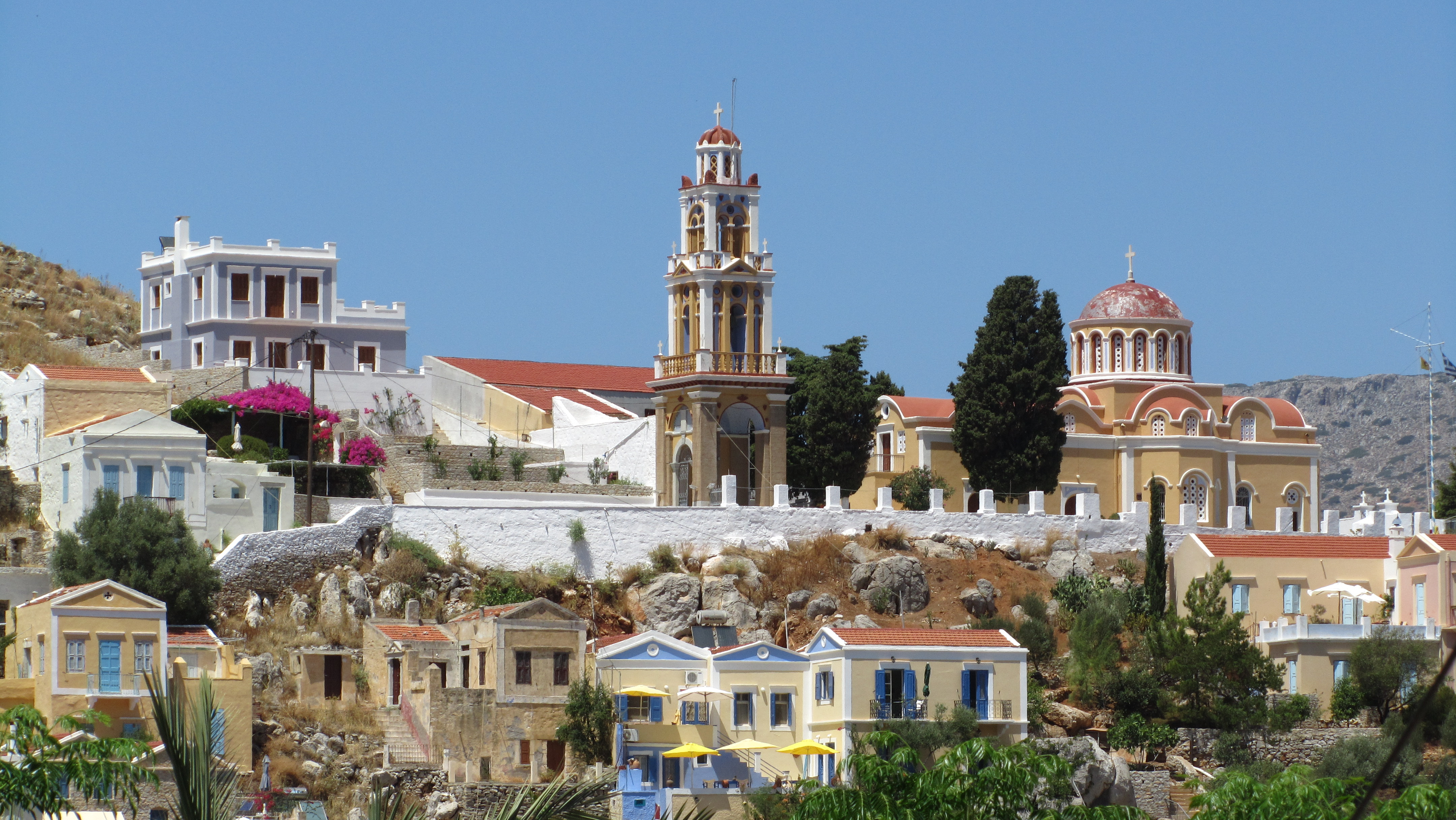
Ano Symi

Ano Symi, (Turkish: Ano Simi) also called Ano Simi, Epáno Sími (Greek: "Upper Symi"), or more commonly Horio or Chorio is the upper part of the main town of the island of Symi (generally referred to using the same name as the island), north-west of the island of Rhodes in Greece. Gialos, also called Yialos, is the lower part of the town, based around the harbor.

Ano Symi is situated on the slope of the hills, in one of the most picturesque areas of Symi, and was for many years largely abandoned by its people, though in recent years has seen some resurgence. It can be accessed via a 500 step stairway made of stone, called Kali Strata (Greek: "Good way").

There are many interesting churches in Ano Simi, with some dating from the Byzantine era: e.g. Aghios Georgios and Metamorfosis. There is also an archaeological museum and the Kastro, the Castle of the Knights of St. John.
