= Costas Valsamis =

Greek sculptor (1908–2003)

Kostas Valsamis
- Born: 6 June 1908; Symi, Ottoman Empire
- Died: 20 December 2003 (aged 95); Athens, Greece
- Occupation: Sculptor

Costas Valsamis (6 June 1908 – 20 December 2003) was a Greek sculptor. He was born on the island of Symi, Dodecanese, then in the Ottoman Empire and died in Athens. His work was part of the sculpture event in the art competition at the 1948 Summer Olympics.

== Career ==
In 1932 Valsamis entered the Athens School of Fine Arts where he studied under Costas Dimitriadis. Completing his studies in 1937, he worked as a sculptor in Athens until 1945, then was granted a scholarship by the French government.

Valsamis entered the Ecole des Beaux-Arts in Paris in the atelier of Marcel Gimond then, at the Académie de la Grande Chaumiere, he was a student of Ossip Zadkine.

== Awards ==
In 1979, he was nominated as a Knight in the Orders of Arts and Letters by the Ministry of Culture and Communication of the French Government.

In 1987, he became a member of the corresponding French Academy of Fine Arts.

== Personal life ==
Valsamis was married to Zoe Valsamis, a painter and graduate of the Ecole des Beaux-Arts in Paris.

== Creations ==
- Heroic Woman, plaster, Middelheimmuseum.
- The Purity, bronze, Parc Montsouris.
- The Mother in the occupation, bronze, the first cemetery of Athens.
- El Greco, bronze bust, Academias street, the square of the cultural center of Athens.
- The Little Fisherman, bronze, Symi.
- The Dove of Peace, Symi.
- C.P. Cavafy, bronze bust, near the Pedion tou Areos, Athens

== Bibliography ==
- Benezit, Dictionary of Artists.
- Dizionario Universale delle Belle Arti Comanducci.
