= Actenodes acornis =

Scientific classification
- Domain: Eukaryota
- Kingdom: Animalia
- Phylum: Arthropoda
- Class: Insecta
- Order: Coleoptera
- Suborder: Polyphaga
- Infraorder: Elateriformia
- Family: Buprestidae
- Genus: Actenodes
- Species: A. acornis

Binomial name
- Actenodes acornis (Say, 1833)

Synonyms
- Actenodes califonicus (Motschulsky, 1859); Actenodes punctatus (Melsheimer, 1845); Actenodes rugulosus (Gory, 1841)

Species of beetle

Actenodes acornis is a species of metallic wood-boring beetle in the family Buprestidae. It is found in North America.

== See also ==
- Actenodes
