= Ioannis Diakidis =

Greek writer

Ioannis Diakidis Ιωάννης Διακίδης
- Born: 1867; Symi, Ottoman Empire (now in Greece)
- Died: 1962 (aged 94–95); Patras, Greece
- Occupation: Writer

Ioannis Diakidis (Greek: Ιωάννης Διακίδης), 1867–1962) was a Greek writer. He was born on the island of Symi in the Dodecanese at the time was part of the Ottoman Empire. He was a soccer player at the Panachaikos with many wins in games. He constructed a mountainous refuge in the Panachaiko mountains, he gave to the government a residence at Korinthou Street and he donated the funds to build the School of People where it was named Diakideios (Greek: Διακίδειος) to honor him. He was the brother of Themistoklis Diakidis, olympic medal winner.
