= Symi =

Greek island in the Aegean Sea

Symi Σύμη
- Municipality
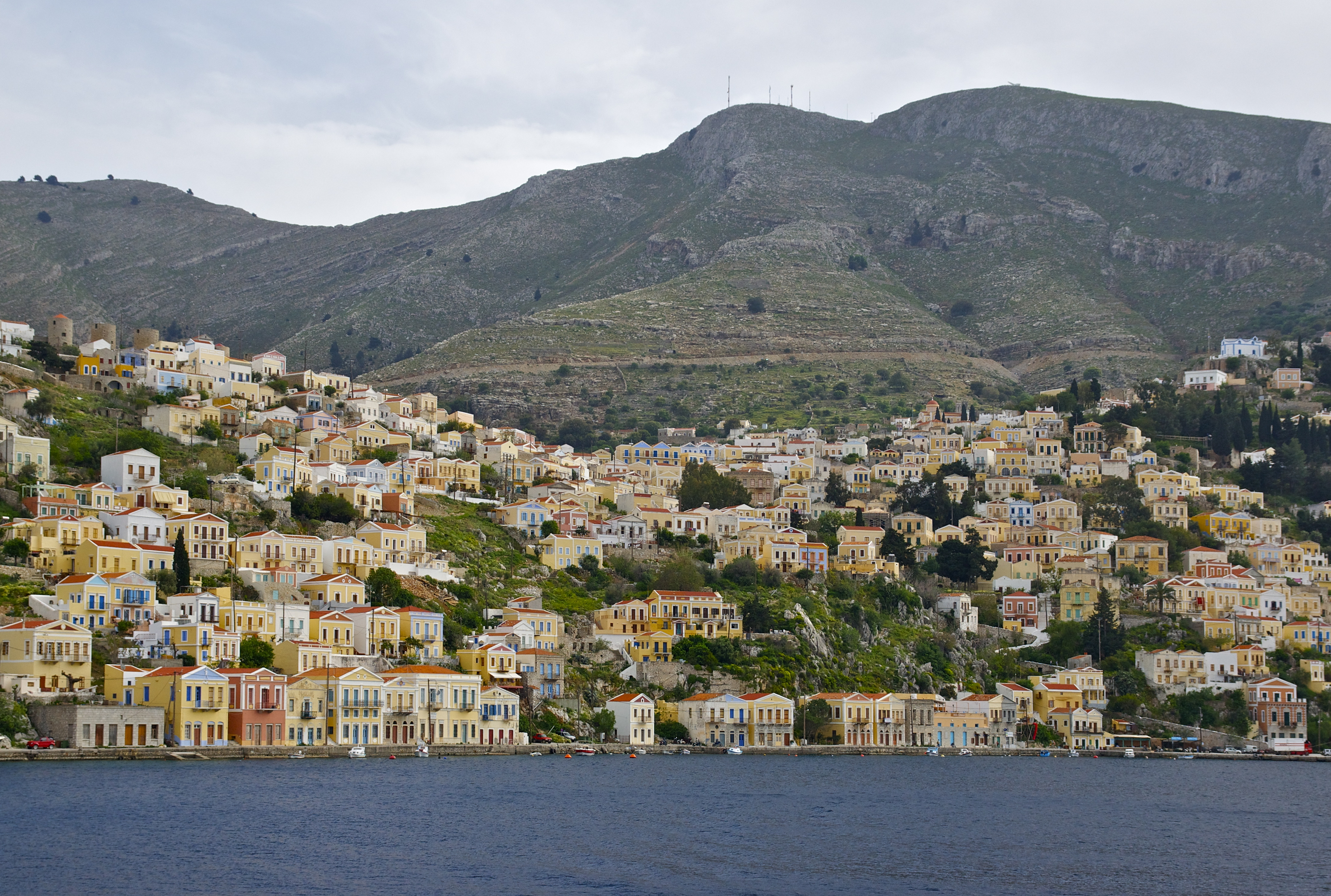
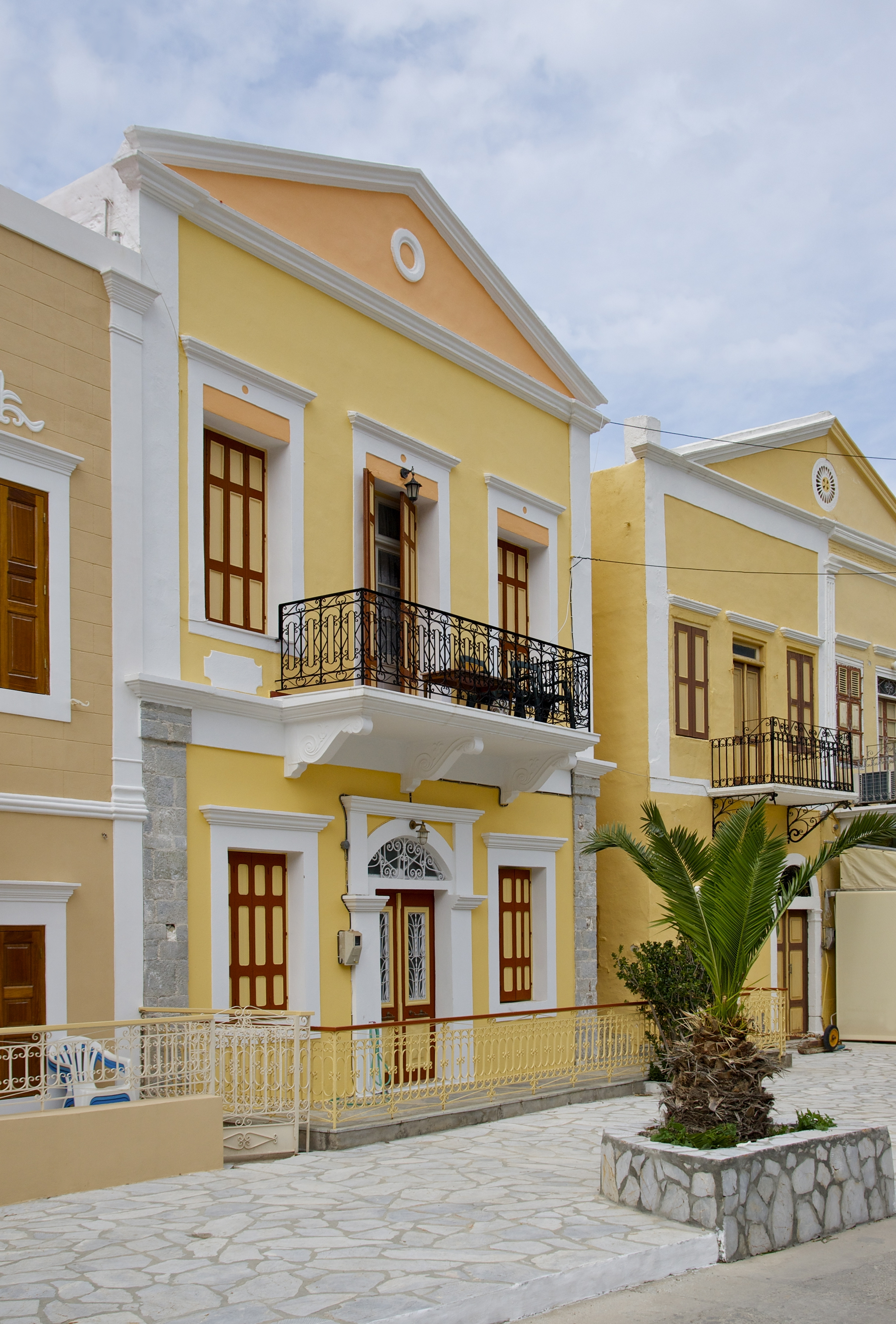
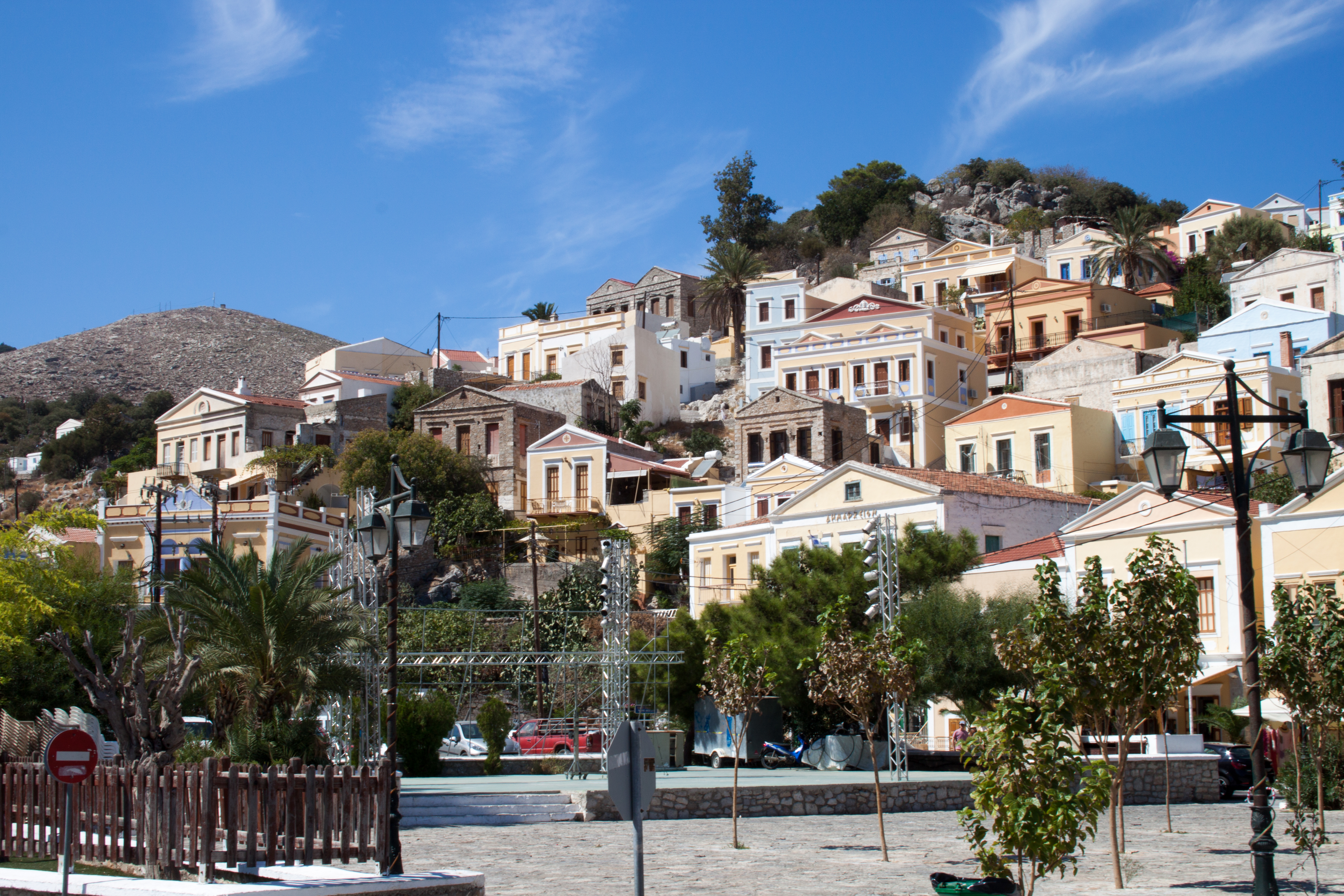
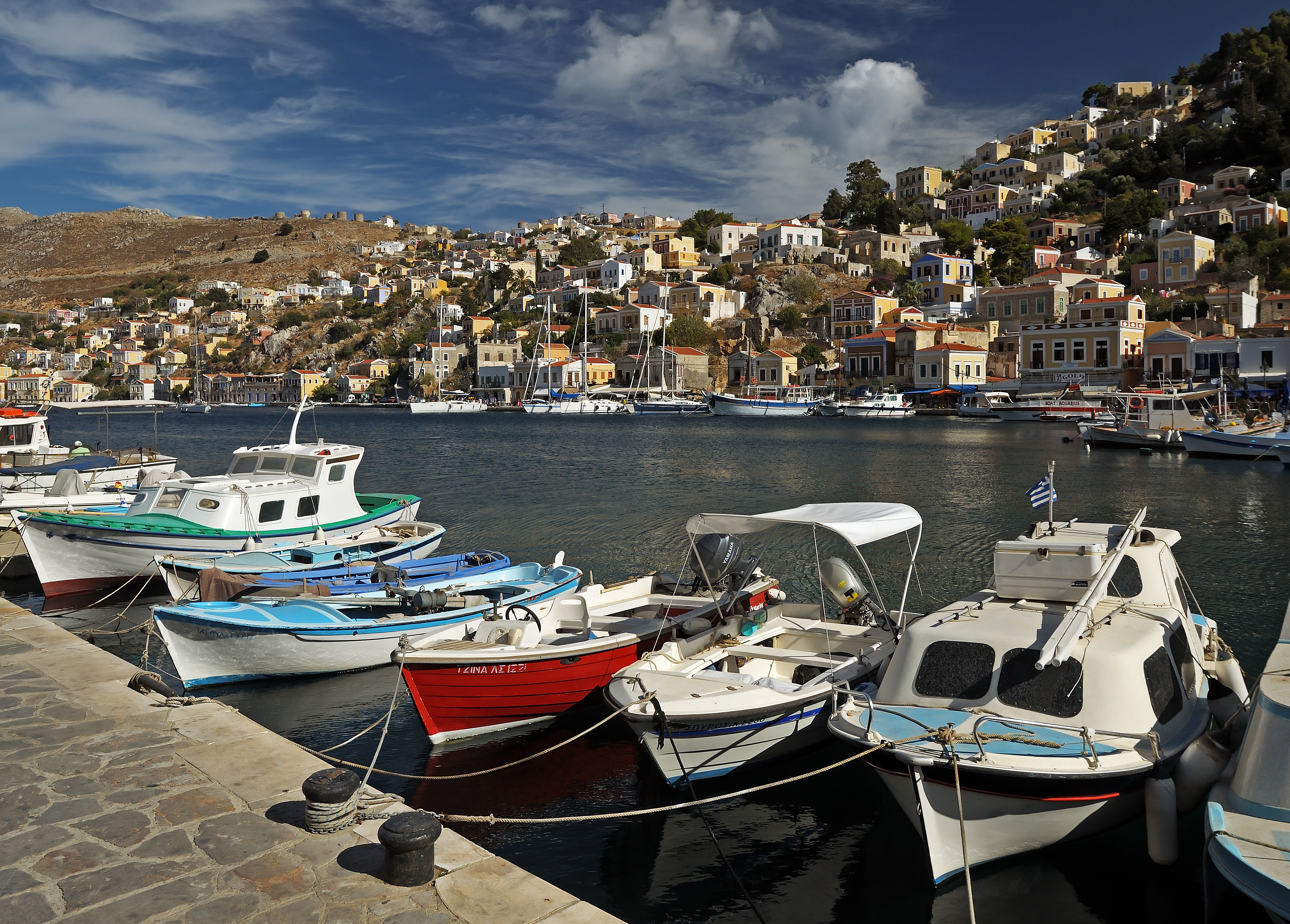
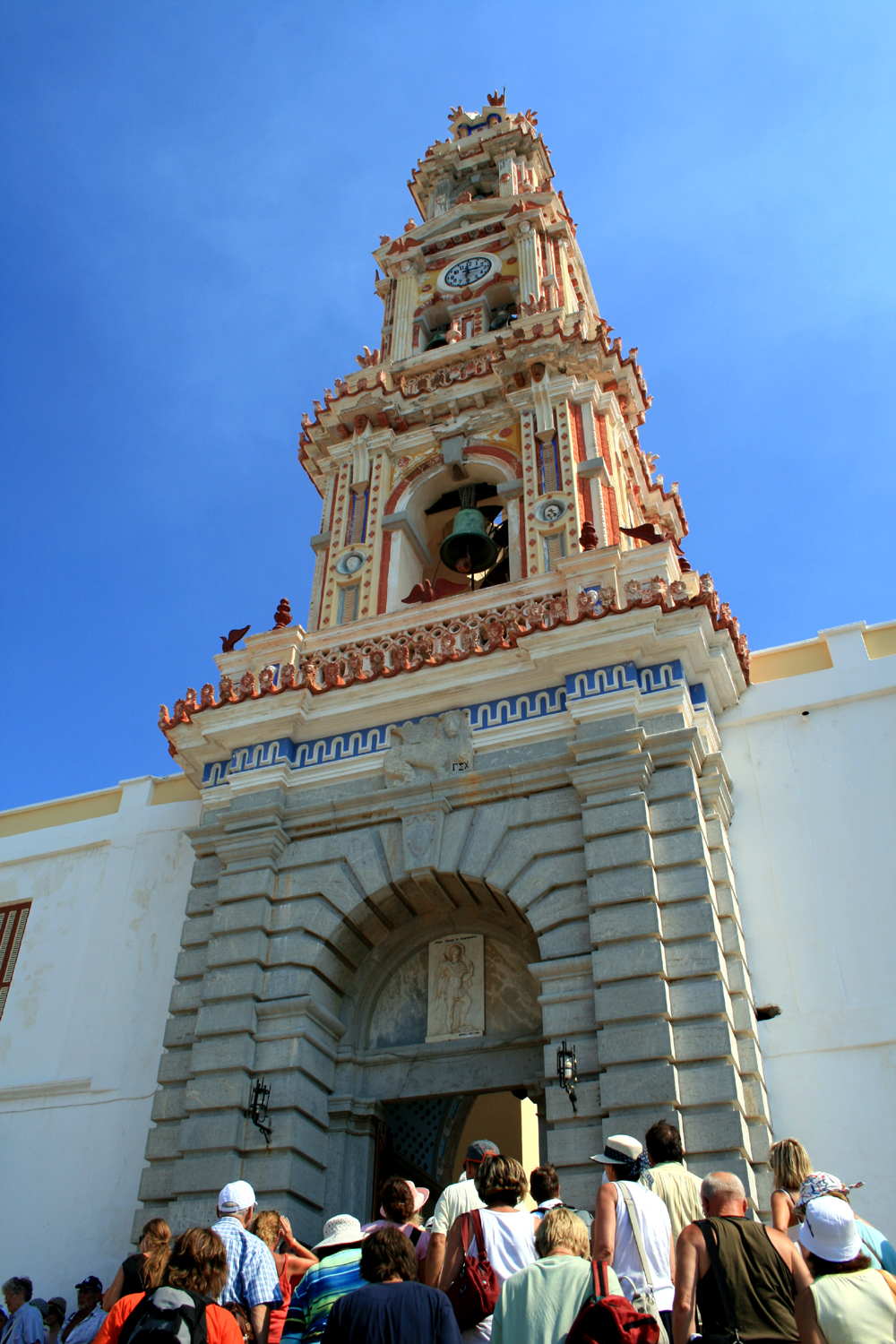
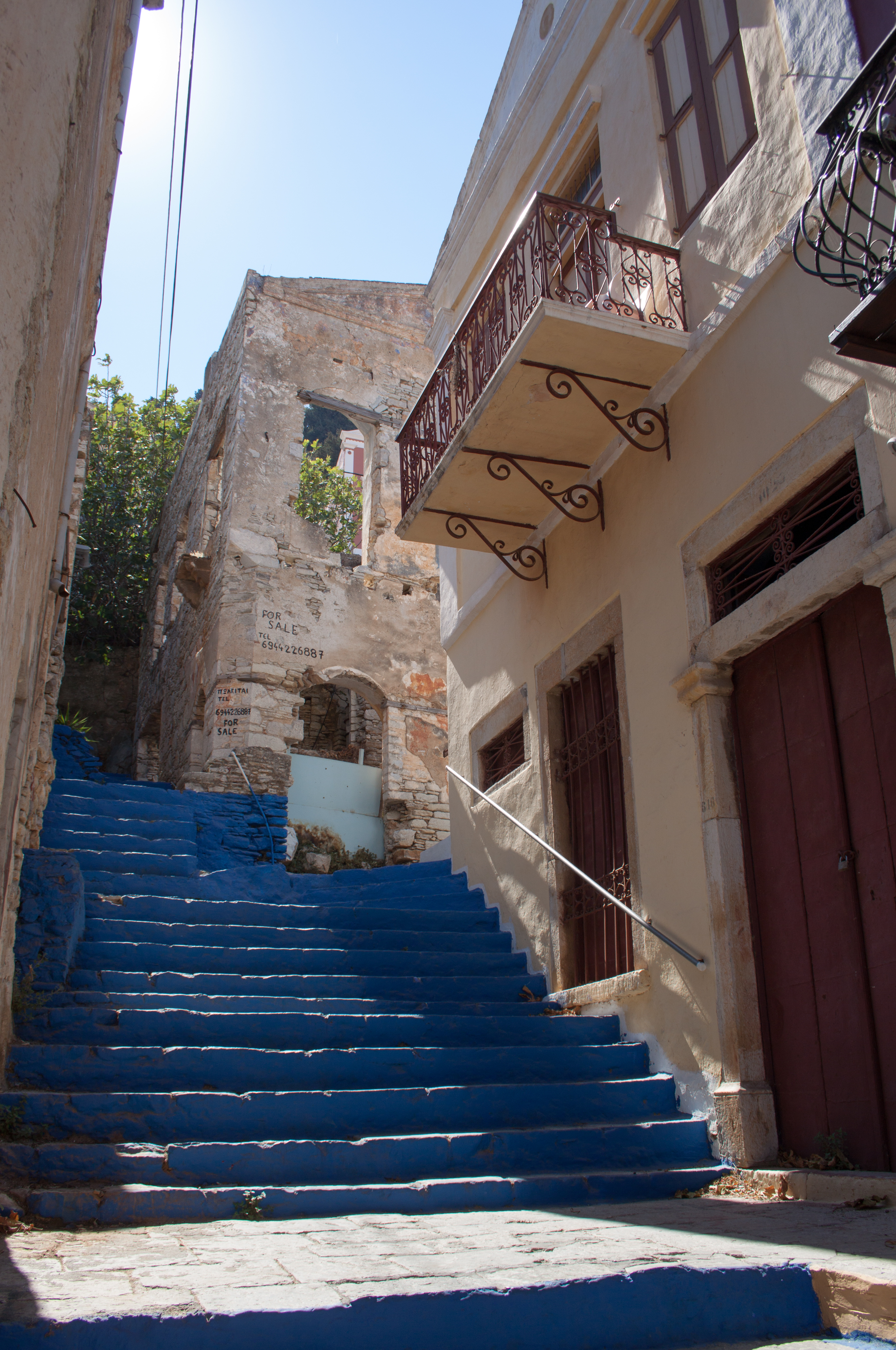
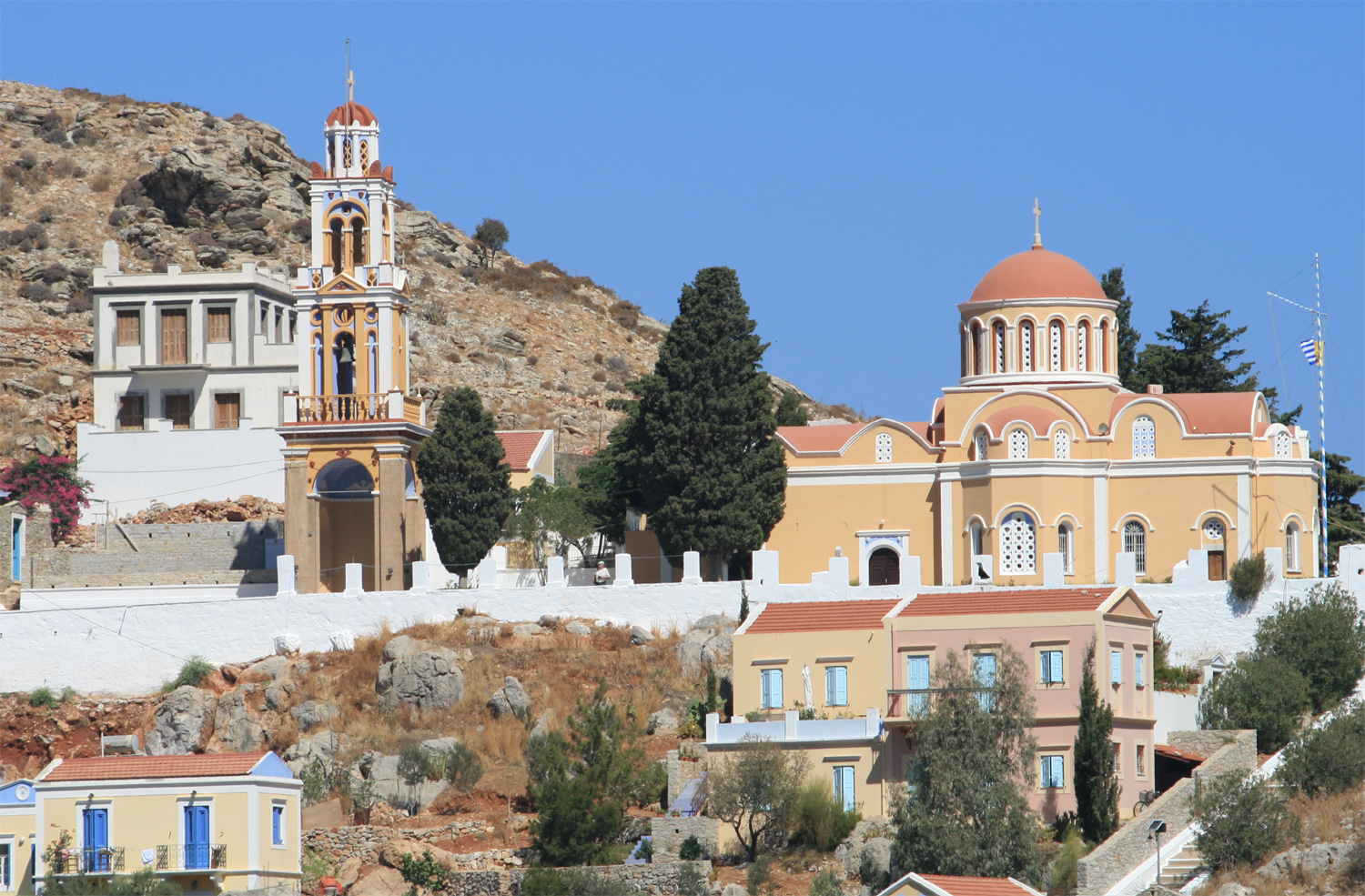
- Clockwise from top: A view of Ano Symi, Gyalou Square, the Monastery of the Archangel Michael Panormitis, Annunciation Church, stairs in Ano Symi, the Port of Symi, a traditional Neoclassical house

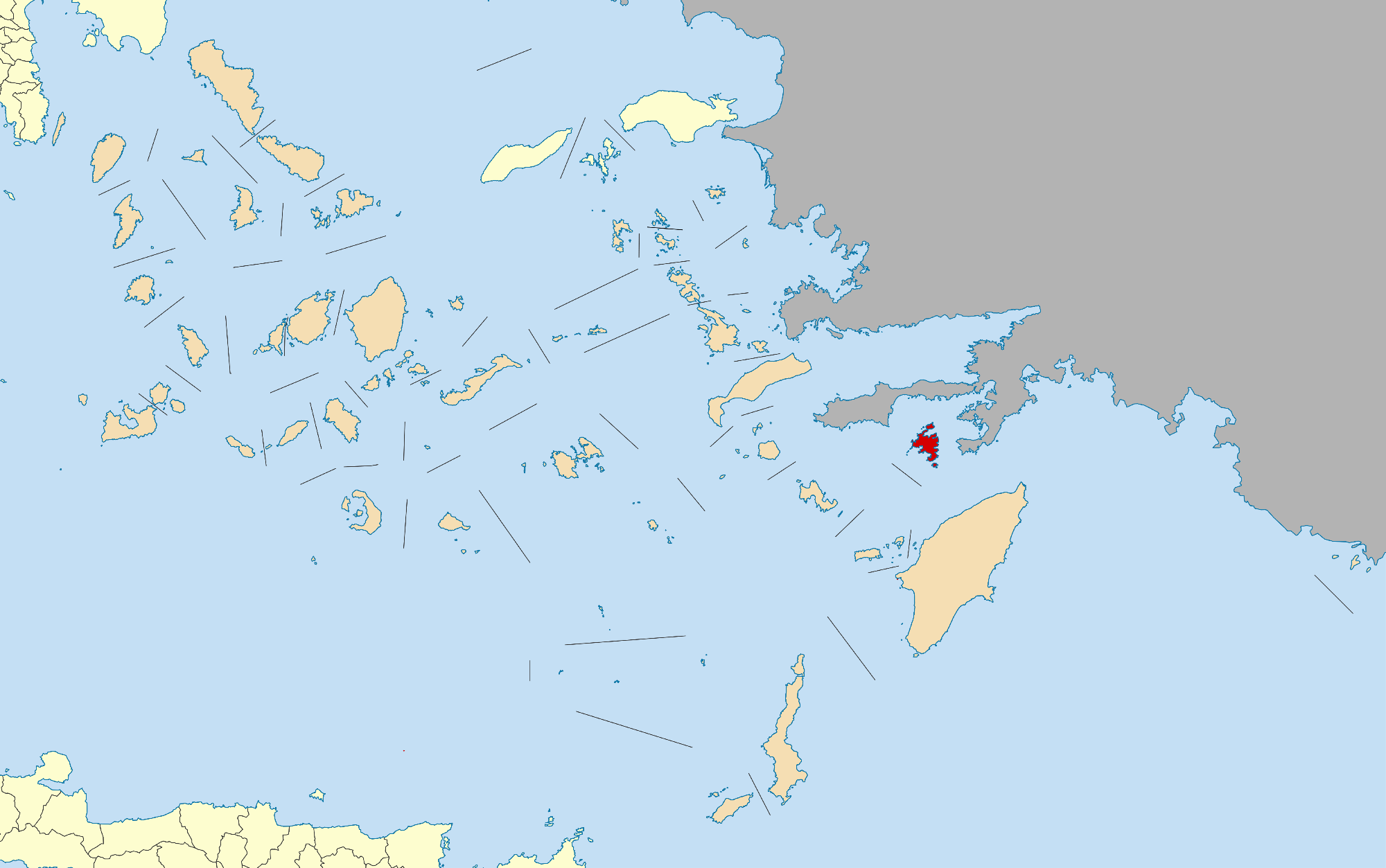

- Location within Greece
- Coordinates: 36°35′N 27°50′E
- Country: Greece
- Administrative region: South Aegean
- Regional unit: Rhodes

Government
  - Mayor: Eleftherios Papakalodoukas (since 2003)

Area
  - Municipality: 65.754 km^{2} (25.388 sq mi)
- Highest elevation: 617 m (2,024 ft)
- Lowest elevation: 0 m (0 ft)

Population (2021)
  - Municipality: 2,603
  - Density: 39.59/km^{2} (102.5/sq mi)
- Time zone: UTC+2 (EET)
  - Summer (DST): UTC+3 (EEST)
- Postal code: 856 00
- Area code: 22460
- Vehicle registration: ΚΧ, ΡΟ, ΡΚ
- Website: symi.gr

Symi, also transliterated as Syme or Simi (Greek: Σύμη), is a Greek island and municipality. It is mountainous and has the harbour town of Symi and its adjacent upper town Ano Symi, as well as several smaller population centres, beaches and areas of significance in history and mythology. Symi is part of the Rhodes regional unit.

The economy of Symi was traditionally based on the shipbuilding and sponge industries. The population peaked at approximately 22,500 during the 19th century. Symi's main industry is now tourism, and in 2021 its permanent population had declined to 2,603 with a larger population during the summer.

== Geography ==
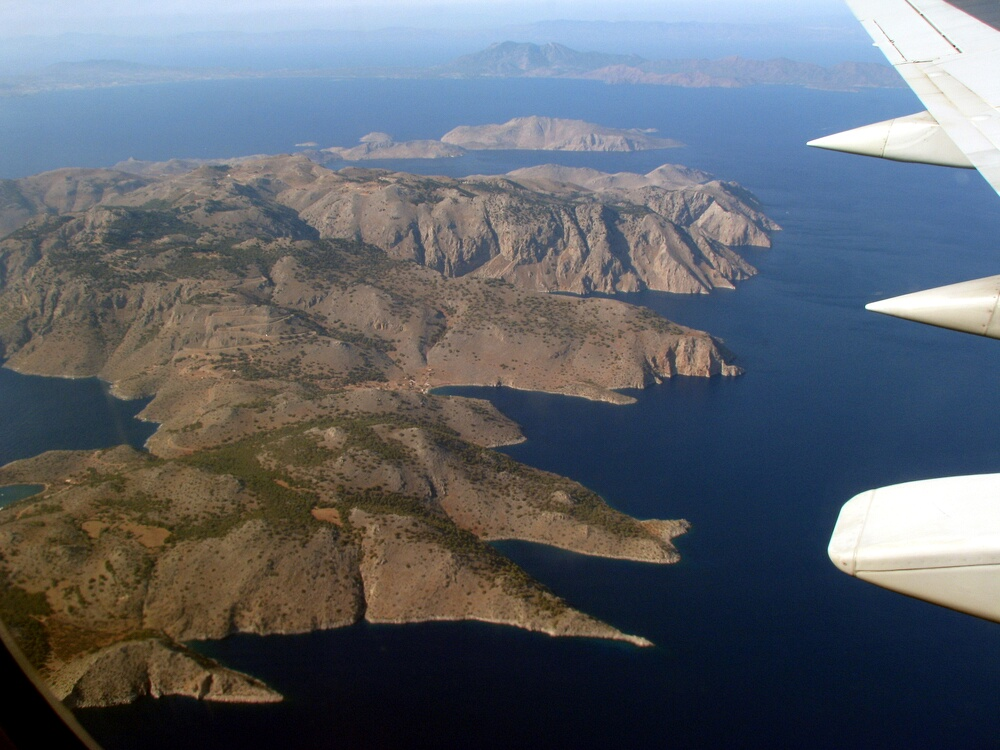
Symi island seen from above, with Turkey in the background

Symi is part of the Dodecanese island chain, about 15 miles (24 km) north of Rhodes, with 58.1 square kilometres (22.4 mi^{2}) of mountainous terrain. Its nearest land neighbors are the Datça and Bozburun peninsulas of Muğla Province in Turkey. Its interior is characterised by small valleys, and its coastline alternates between rocky cliffs, beaches and isolated coves.

Its main town, located on the northeast coast, is named Symi. The lower town around the harbour, is referred to as Yialos, and the upper town is called Horio or Ano Symi. Other townships are Pedi, Nimborio, Marathounda and Panormitis. Panormitis is the location of the island's famous monastery which is visited by people from all over the world, and many Greeks pay homage to St Michael of Panormitis each year. The island has 2,603 inhabitants, mostly engaged in tourism, fishing, and trade. In the tourist season which lasts from Easter until Panormitis Day in early November, tourists and day-trippers increase the number of people on the island to as much as 6,000.

The Municipality of Sými includes the uninhabited offshore islets of Gialesíno, Diavátes, Kouloúndros, Marmarás, Nímos, Sesklío, and Chondrós. Its total land area is 65.754 square kilometres (25.388 sq mi).

== History ==
In Greek mythology, Symi is reputed to be the birthplace of the Charites, and takes its name from the nymph Syme. According to a different account attributed to Mnaseas in Athenaeus' Deipnosophistae, Glaucus named the island after his wife Syme, when they settled the island. In antiquity, the island was known as Aigli and Metapontis. Pliny the Elder and some later writers claimed that the name was derived from simia, "a monkey".

In Homer's Iliad, the island is mentioned as the domain of King Nireus, who fought in the Trojan War on the side of the Greeks and was described as the most handsome man in the Achaean forces, after Achilles. Thucydides writes that during the Peloponnesian War there was a Battle of Syme near the island in January, 411 BC, in which an unspecified number of Spartan ships defeated a squadron of Athenian vessels.

Little is known about the island before the 14th century. Archaeological evidence indicates that it was continuously inhabited, and ruins of citadels suggest that it was an important location. It was part of the Roman Empire and later the Byzantine Empire, until its conquest by the Knights of St. John in 1309.

=== Early modern: Hospitaller and Ottoman eras ===
This conquest, fueled by the Knights' interest in shipping and commerce, launched several centuries of prosperity for Symi, as its location amidst the Dodecanese made it an important waypoint for trade until the advent of steam-powered shipping in the 19th century. In 1522, Symi was conquered by the Ottoman Empire, along with nearby Rhodes, but it was allowed to retain many of its privileges, so its prosperity continued virtually uninterrupted.

Under the Ottomans the island was called Sömbeki. Symi was noted for its sponges, which provided much of its wealth. At a certain point, the island had the largest sponge fishing fleet in the world. It attained the height of its prosperity in the mid 19th century. Many of the colorful neoclassical mansions covering the slopes near the main city date from that period. Although Symiots took part in the Greek War of Independence of 1821–1829, it was left out of the new Greek state and remained under Ottoman rule.

=== Modern era ===
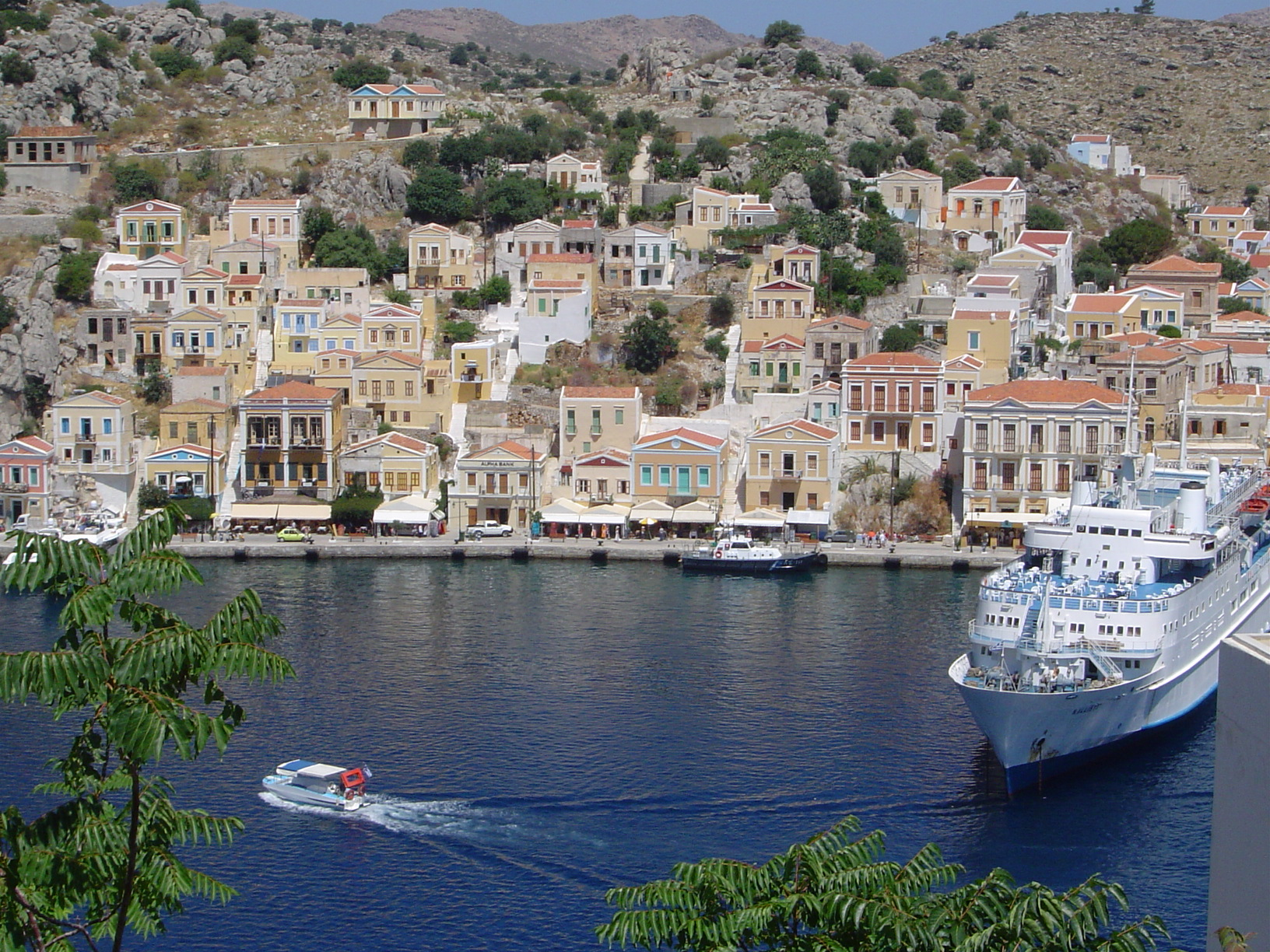
The port in Ano Symi

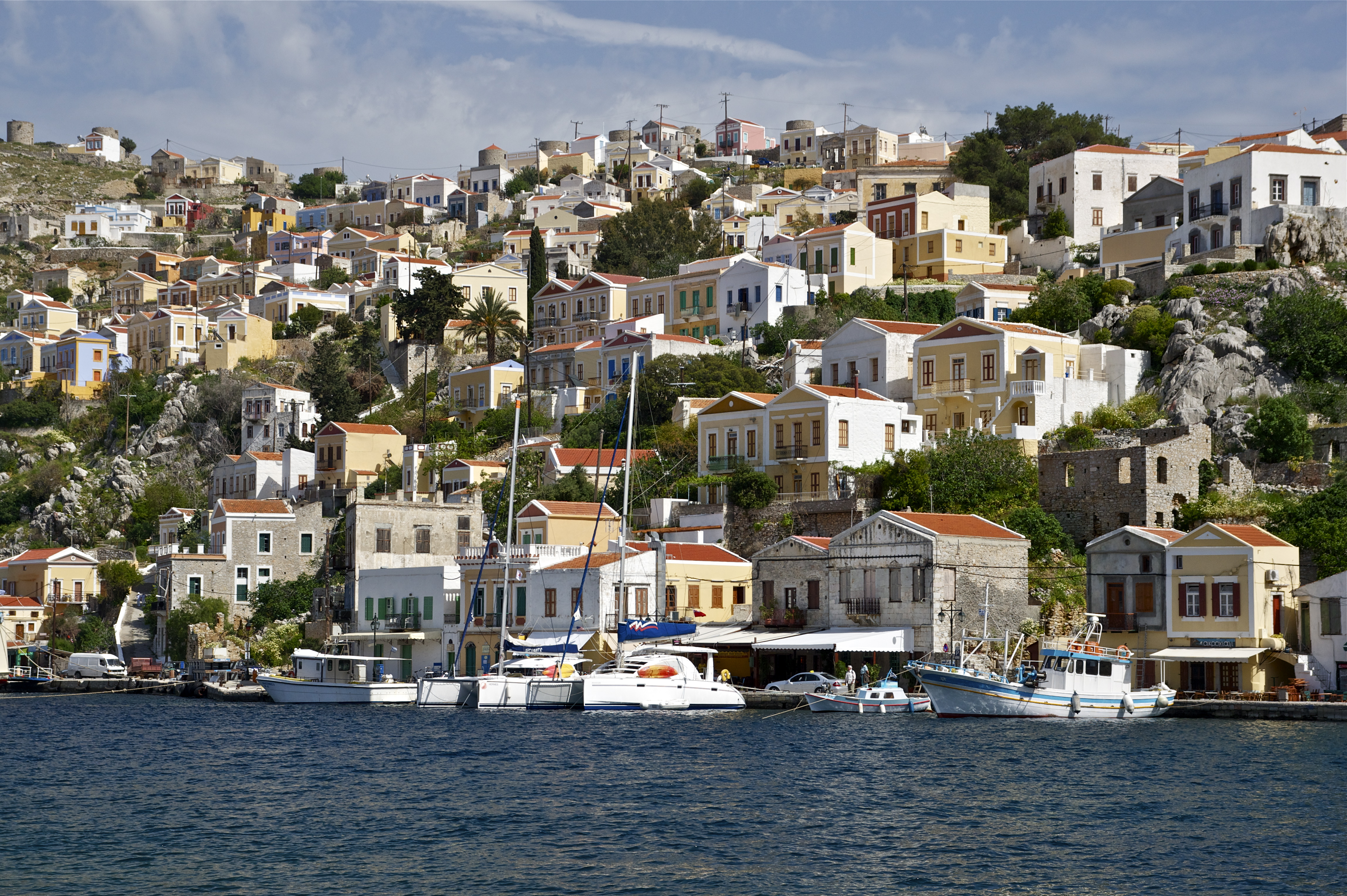
Houses on the island

The island, along with the rest of the Dodecanese, changed hands several times in the 20th century. In 1912, the Dodecanese declared independence from the Ottomans to become the Federation of the Dodecanese Islands, though they were almost immediately occupied by Italy. The island was formally ceded to Italy in 1923, and on 12 October 1943 it was occupied by the Nazis. In 1944, Greek and British forces carried out a raid, defeating the German garrison and evacuating the local population.

At the end of World War II, the surrender of German forces in the region took place on Symi to the British. The island was occupied by Britain for three years as a result. Symi became part of Greece in 1948.

The island has become popular with tourists from abroad, especially British, French and Italians, and is now the permanent home of about 120 non-Greek residents, some 50 of whom are British. Apart from tourists visiting from other Dodecanese islands by ferry, the scenic port of Gialos is a popular marina for sailors. The influx of tourists has led to the restoration of a great number of homes, many of which were destroyed during World War II. These restorations, by law, have to conform to "guidelines laid down by the Greek culture ministry's Archaeological Service". Between 1998 and 2006, it is estimated that the price of a "ruin" on Symi increased fivefold. The growing population of EU expatriates has led to demographic as well as political changes, since EU citizens are allowed to vote in local elections and have attempted to exert influence on the island's politics. Opinions on whether this is a sign of growing integration differ.

On 5 June 2024, British TV and radio presenter Michael Mosley went missing on the island while on holiday with his wife. After four days of searching, his body was found on 9 June, on the rocky slope outside the wall of a private resort called Agia Marina. It appeared that he had taken the wrong path sometime after leaving the town of Pedi.

== Culture ==
=== Landmarks ===
- In late 2020 the renovated Historical Museum of Symi reopened. The collections include many artefacts found by the early 20th-century Symian antiquarians Michael and Niketas Chaviaras, sons of Demosthenes Chaviaras (1849–1922), himself an important figure in local historical research. In the 1980s, the Chaviaras family archive was donated to the museum.
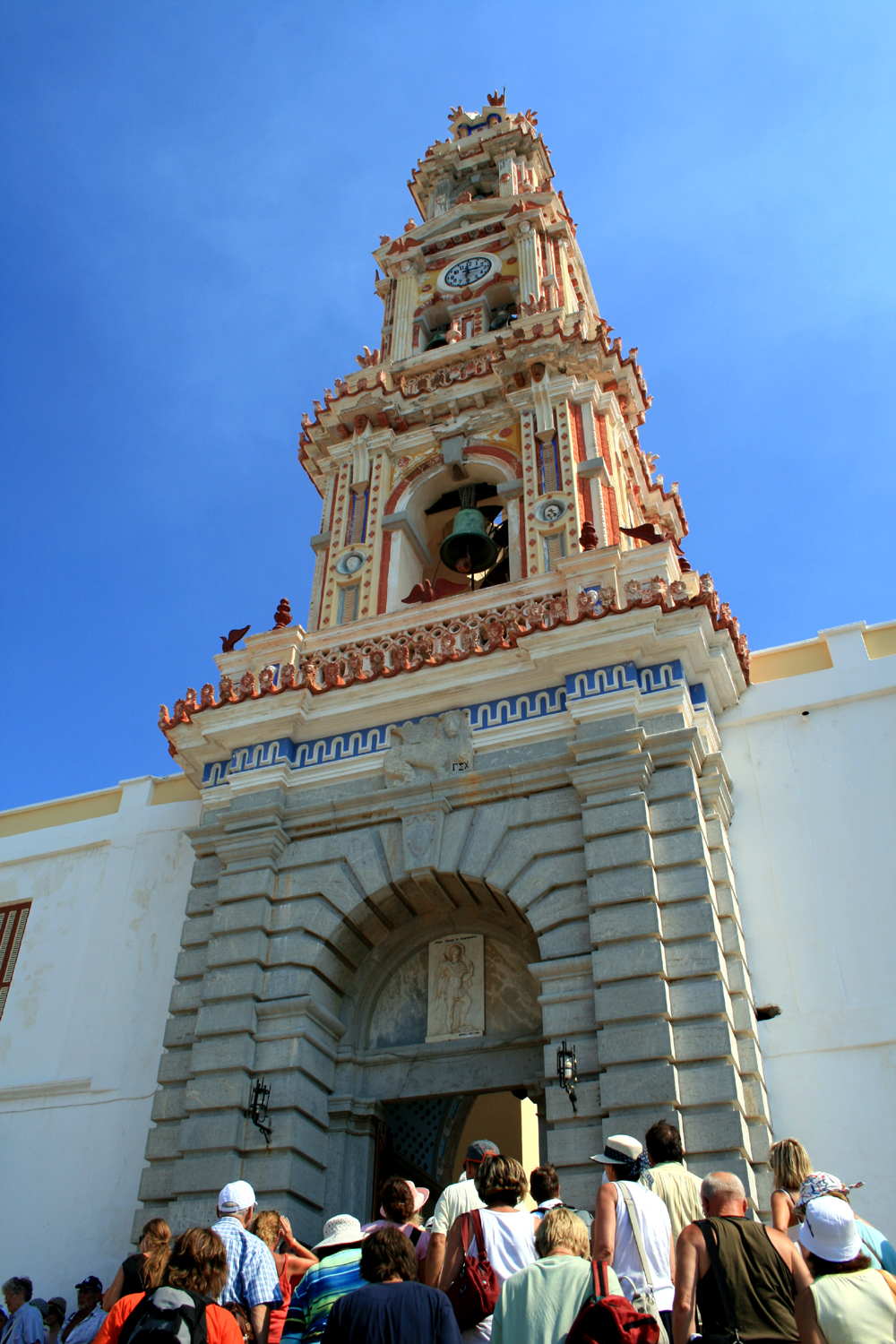
Panormitis Monastery

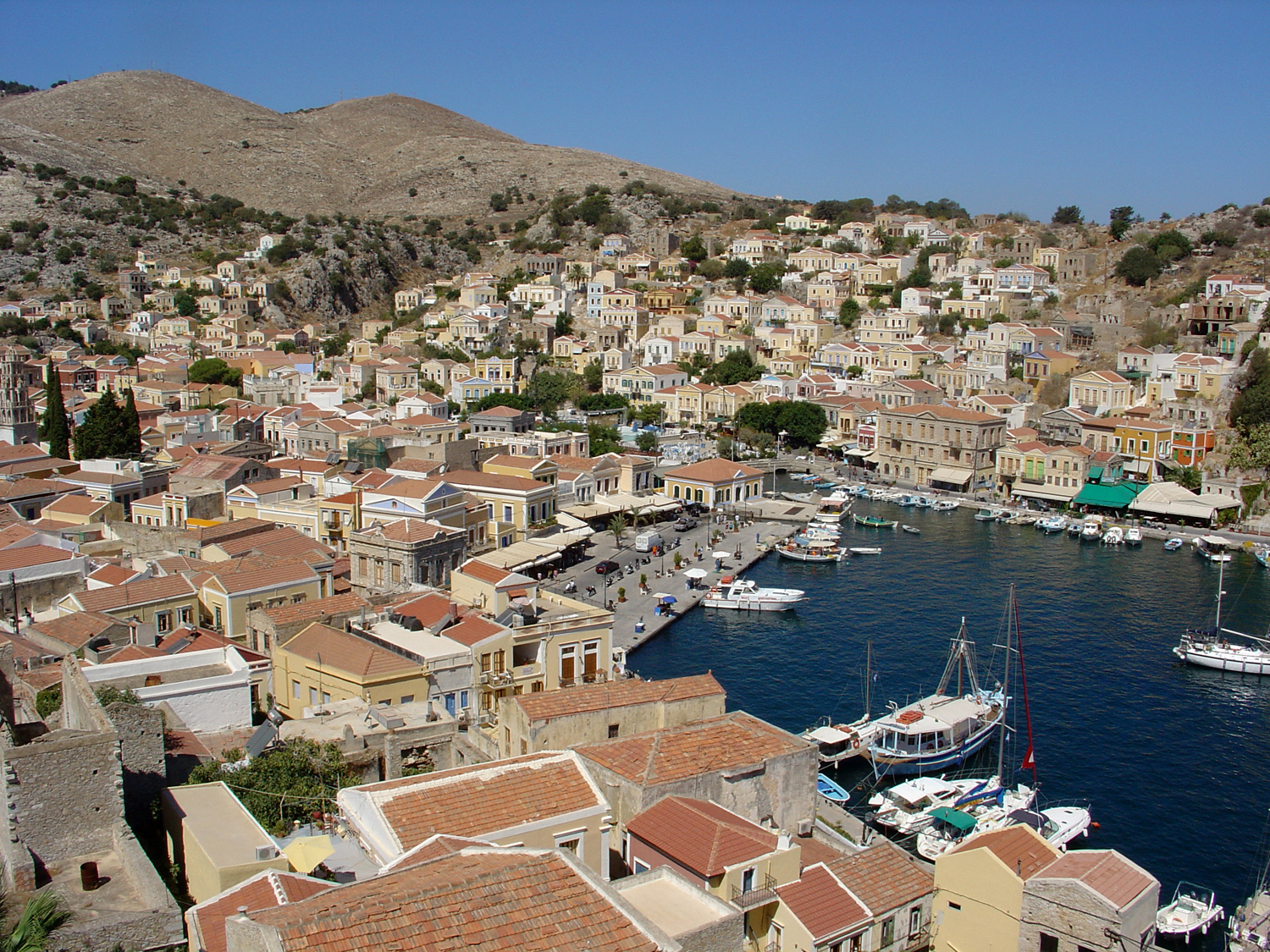
Panoramic view

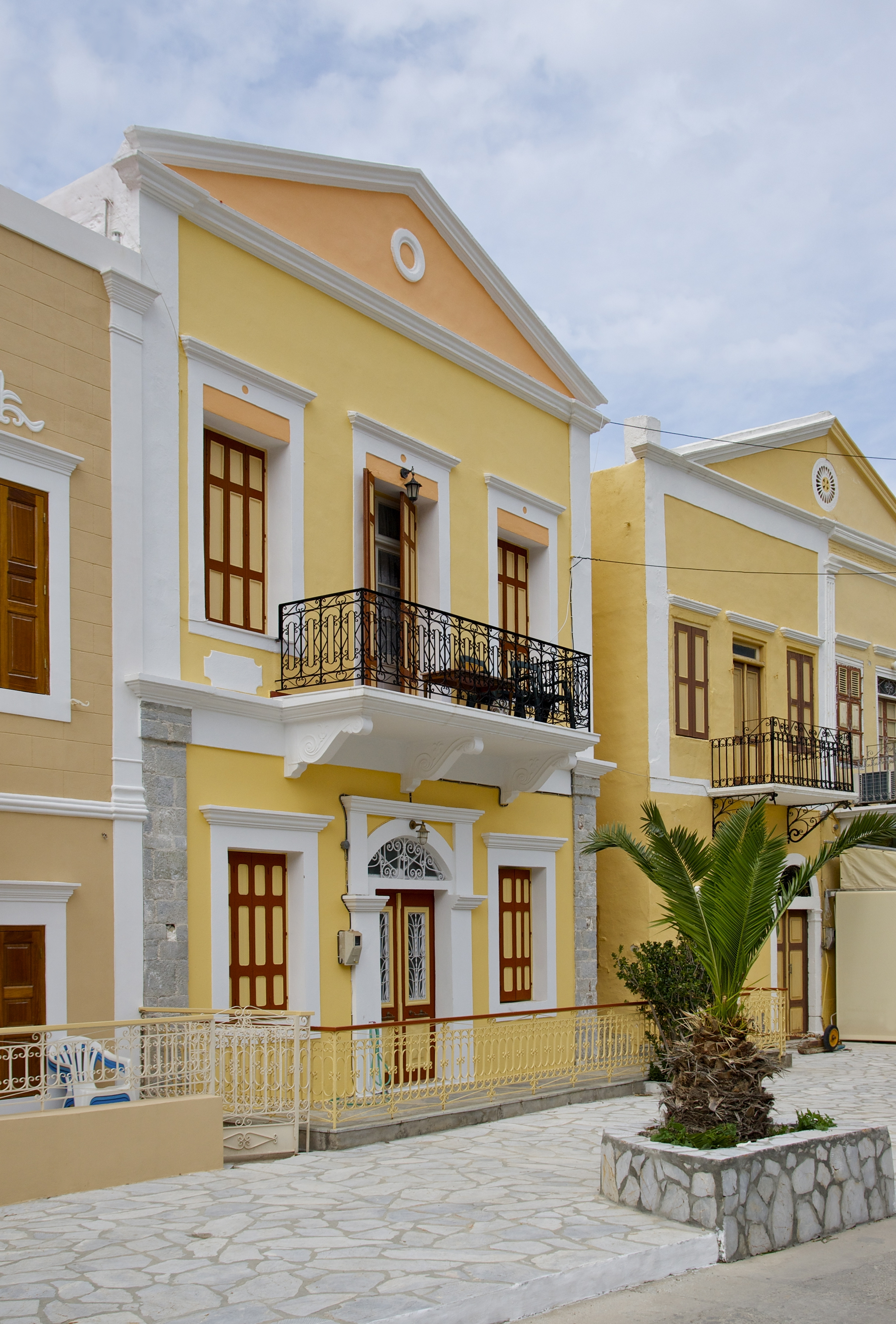
Colourful house

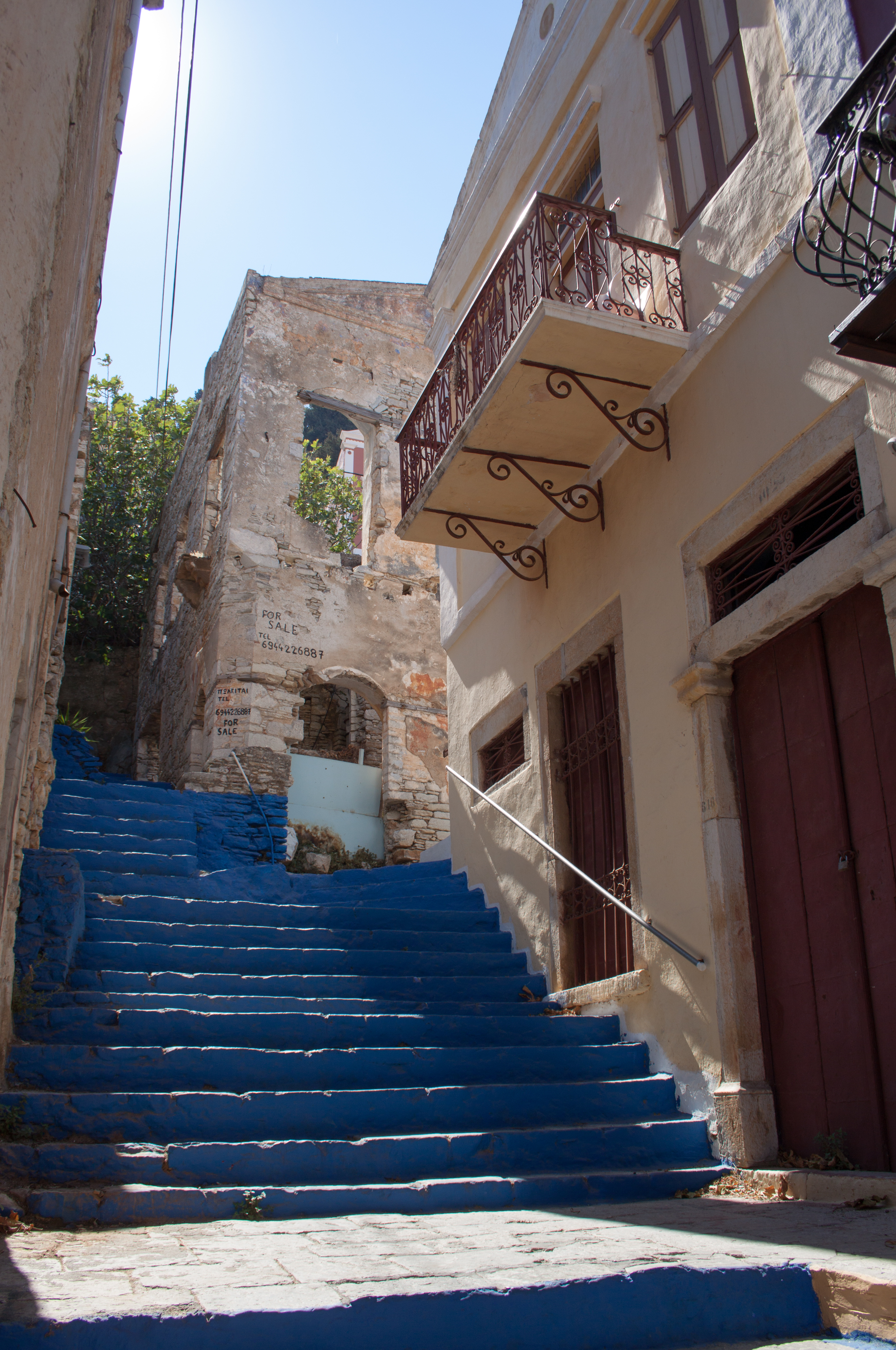
Stairs of the upper town

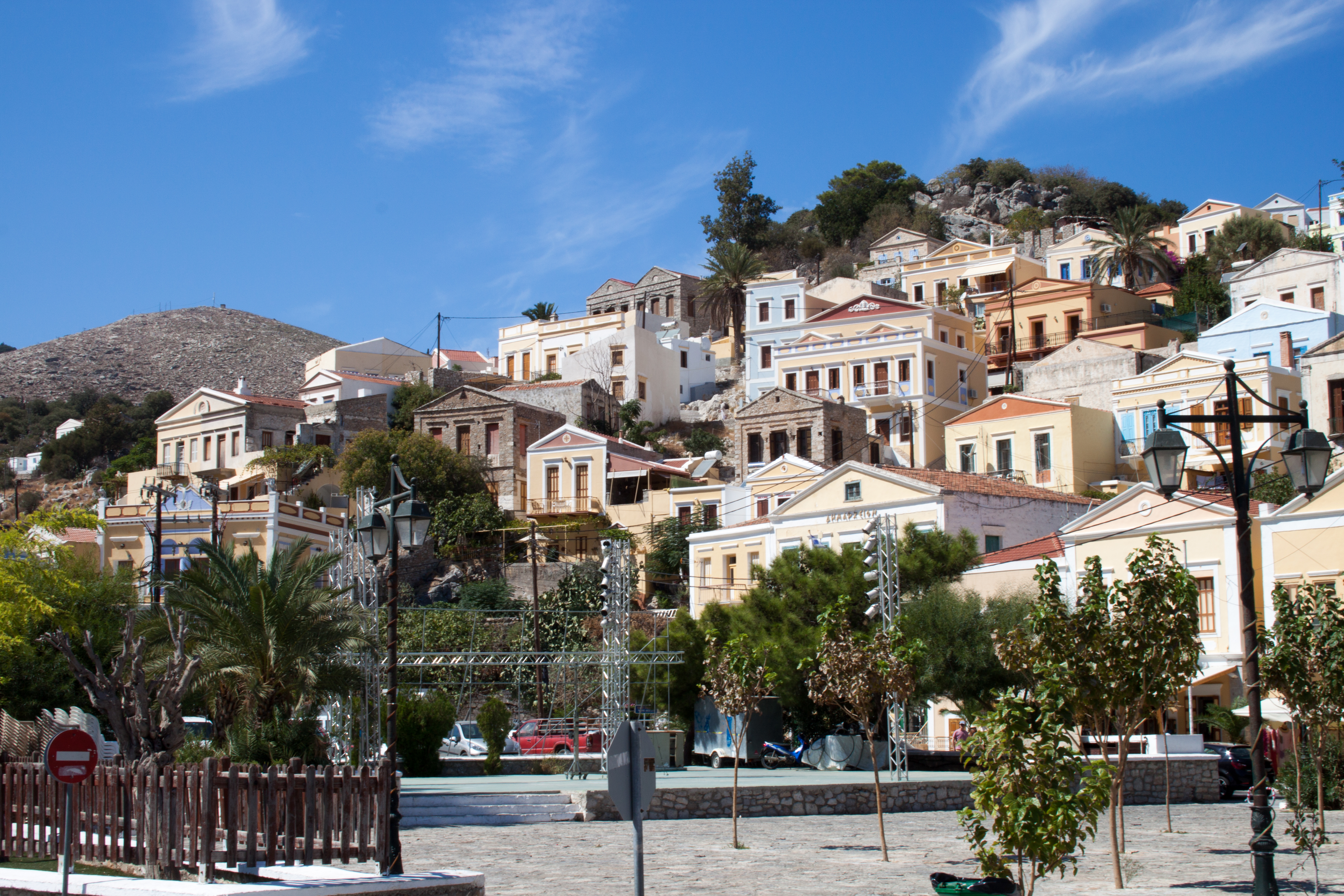
A square

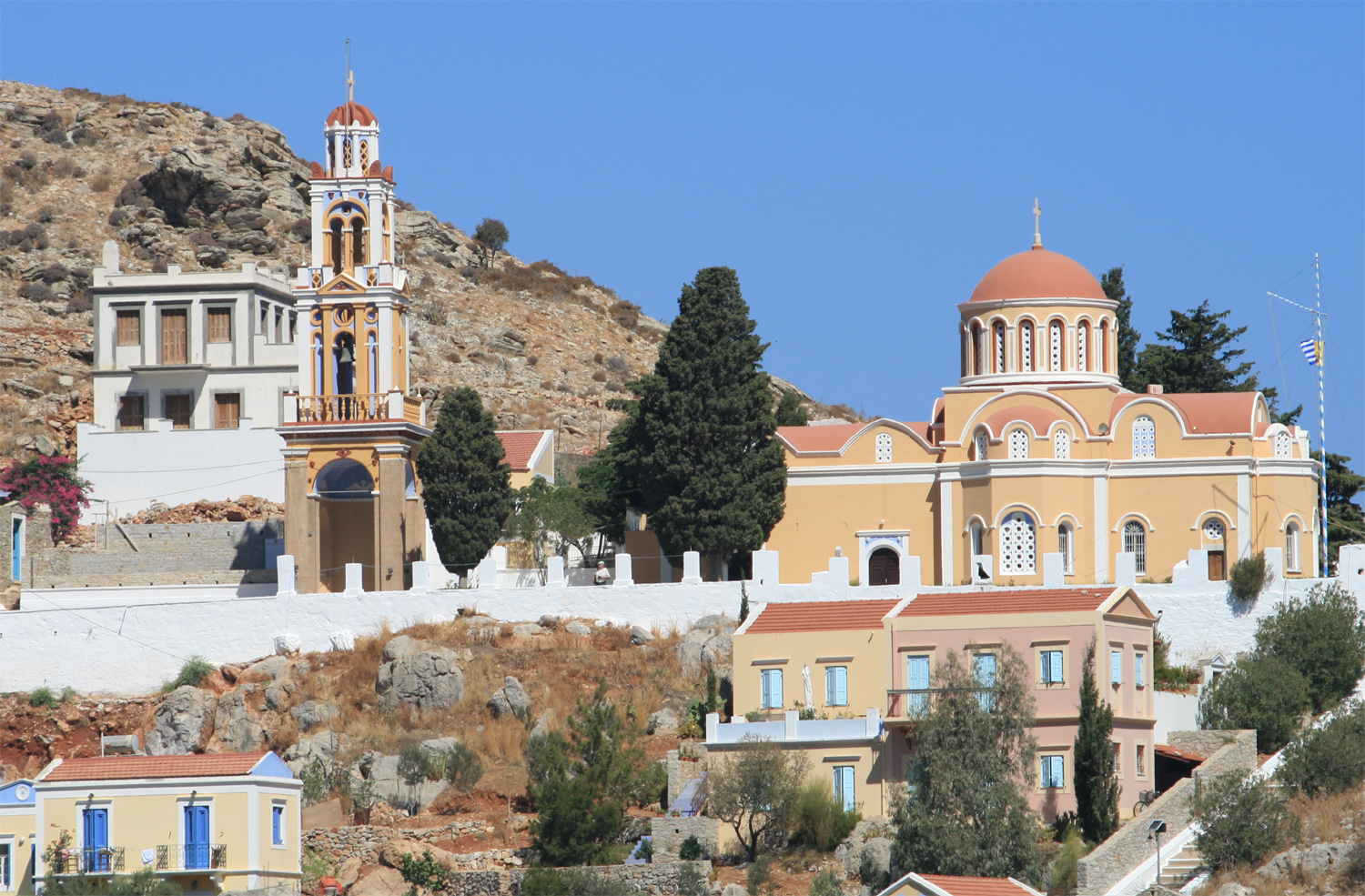
A church

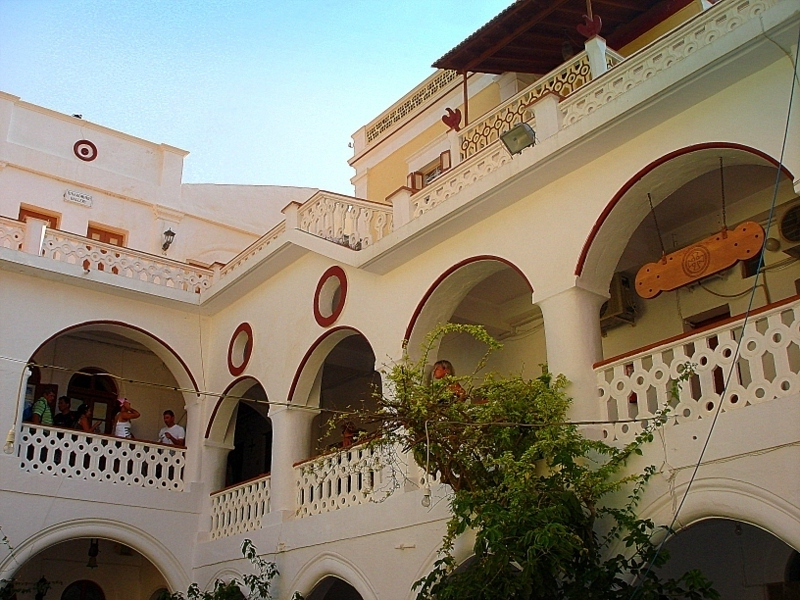
Panormitis Monastery

=== Festival ===
Since 1995, Symi has hosted the Symi Festival during July to September. This festival was founded by Greek political journalist Yannis Diakogiannis,

=== Sister cities ===
In 2008, Tarpon Springs, Florida, a town with a high percentage of Greek Americans, established a sister city-relationship with Symi. Located on the Gulf Coast of the United States, Tarpon Springs attracted many Greek sponge fishermen to Florida, for the "sponge rush" at the beginning of the twentieth century.

== Notable people ==
- Costas Valsamis, sculptor
- Ioannis Diakidis, writer
- Stathis Hatzis, who dove to 87 m in 1913 on a single breath

== See also ==
- List of traditional Greek place names
