= Foreign relations of Canada =

Foreign relations data
- Diplomatic missions aboard: 291
- Countries with missions: 189
- Foreign missions in Canada: 396
- Free trade agreements: 15
- Countries with free trade agreements: 51
- Countries with sanctions imposed by Canada: 24
- Foreign direct investment (2025): $1.6T
- Canadian investment abroad (2025): $2.4T
- Value of goods and services exchanged with largest trading partner - USA (2024): $1.3T
- Foreign aid (2024): $12B
- United Nations funding (2024): $2.2B
- Peacekeeping funding (2025): $147M
- Military assistance to Ukraine (2022-2029): $6.5B
- Domestic support for Canada's role on the global stage: High
- Positive international reputation: High

Canada is recognized as a middle power for its role in global affairs with a tendency to pursue multilateral and international solutions. Globalization has significantly influenced Canadian foreign policies, with the country promoting its domestically shared values of democratization, human rights, diversity, the rule of law, and aid to developing nations through participation in multiple international organizations.

The "golden age of Canadian diplomacy" refers to a period in Canadian history, typically considered to be the mid-twentieth century, when Canada experienced a high level of success in its foreign relations and diplomatic efforts. Canada's leading role in the creation of the Universal Declaration of Human Rights, and its development of modern peacekeeping during this period played a major role in the country's positive global image. Although Canada has since fostered a favourable reputation on the world stage, it has faced controversy over its involvement in some foreign countries, notably the 1993 Somalia affair.

Canada and the United States have a long, complex, and intertwined relationship, historically close allies, co-operating regularly on military campaigns and humanitarian efforts. Notwithstanding, Canada has long been reluctant to participate in American-led military interventions that are not sanctioned by the United Nations. Canada also maintains traditional ties to the United Kingdom and to France, along with both countries' former colonies through its membership in the Commonwealth of Nations and the Organisation internationale de la Francophonie. Canada is noted for having a positive relationship with the Netherlands, owing, in part, to its contribution to the Dutch liberation during World War II. Canada has diplomatic and consular offices in over 270 locations in approximately 189 countries.

Canada was a founding member of the United Nations in 1945 and formed the North American Aerospace Defense Command together with the United States in 1958. Canada has membership in the World Trade Organization, the Five Eyes, the G7 and the Organisation for Economic Co-operation and Development (OECD). Canada acceded to the International Covenant on Civil and Political Rights in 1976, joined the Organization of American States (OAS) in 1990, and seeks to expand its ties to Pacific Rim economies through membership in the Asia-Pacific Economic Cooperation forum (APEC). Canada is a signatory to 15 free trade agreements with 51 different countries.

== Historical overview ==
The Signatories of the Kellogg-Briand Pact outside the League of Nations (1928) (Note: Front row from left: Adachi Mineichirō (Japan), William Mackenzie King (Canada), Count Uchida Kōsai (Japan), Alfred Oberkirch (France), President Gaston Doumergue (France), Frank B. Kellogg (United States), Aristide Briand (France), Myron T. Herrick (United States), Sir William G. Tyrrell (United Kingdom), Back row from left: Count Gaetano Manzoni (Italy), Édouard Herriot (France), Jacobus Stephanus Smit (South Africa), Alexander McLachlan (Australia), Edvard Benes (Czechoslovakia).)

The foreign policies of Canada and its predecessor colonies were under British control until the 20th century. This included wars with the United States in 1775-1783 and 1812–1815. Economic ties with the U.S. were always close. Political tensions arose in the 19th century from anti-British sentiment in the U.S in the 1860s. Boundary issues caused diplomatic disputes resolved in the 1840s over the Maine boundary and in the early 20th century over the Alaska boundary. There is ongoing discussion regarding the Arctic.

Canada participated in Britain's wars, especially the Boer war, World War I and World War II. However, there was a bitter dispute between Francophone and Anglophone Canada during the First World War. Canada had its own seat in the League of Nations but played a small role in world affairs until the 1940s.

== Contemporary multilateralism ==
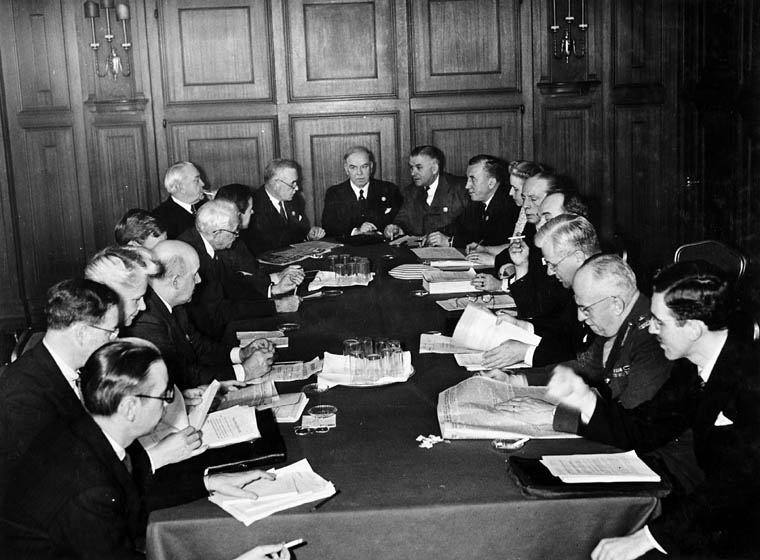
The Canadian Delegation to the United Nations Conference on International Organization, San Francisco, May 1945 (Note: from Left to Right; C.S. Ritchie, P.E. Renaud, Elizabeth MacCallum, Lucien Moraud, Escott Reid, W.F. Chipman, Lester Pearson, J.H. King, Louis St. Laurent, Rt. Hon. W.L. Mackenzie King, Gordon Graydon, M.J. Coldwell, Cora Casselman, Jean Desy, Hume Wrong, Louis Rasminsky, L.D. Wilgress, M.A. Pope, R. Chaput)

The "golden age of Canadian diplomacy" refers to a period in Canadian history, typically considered to be the mid-twentieth century, when Canada experienced a high level of success in its foreign relations and diplomatic efforts. Canada's foreign policies with a tendency to pursue multilateral and international solutions have been implemented since the end of World War II. In the early Cold-War years, Canada served as a mediator in international conflicts, and has since fostered a very positive reputation on the world stage, widely viewed as a responsible and ethical country. Canada's central role in the development of the Universal Declaration of Human Rights in the late 1940s, and peacekeeping in the mid-1950s gave it credibility and established it as a country fighting for the "common good" of all nations.

As an active middle power, Canada has engaged with the United Nations, NATO and the European Union (EU) to promote its domestically shared values of health, education, food security, climate action, gender equality, economic stability, human rights, and democracy. Approximately 80% to 90% of Canadians "strongly support" maintaining an active role on the global stage, with the notion of peacekeeping deeply embedded in Canadian culture, that Canadians feel sets their foreign policy apart from its closest ally, the United States.

Militarily, Canada has long been reluctant to participate in operations that are lacking UN Security Council approval, such as the Vietnam War, the 2003 Iraq War and 2026 Iran war. Canada has participated in US-led, UN-sanctioned operations such as the first Gulf War, in Afghanistan and Libya. The country also participates with its NATO allies in UN-sanctioned missions, such as the Kosovo Conflict and in Haiti. Canada has faced controversy over its involvement in some foreign conflicts, notably during the 1990s, first with the Somalia affair, an incident that has been described as "the darkest era in the history of the Canadian military", and during the United Nations Assistance Mission for Rwanda with the perceived failure to prevent or intervene in the Rwandan genocide.

=== Foreign aid ===
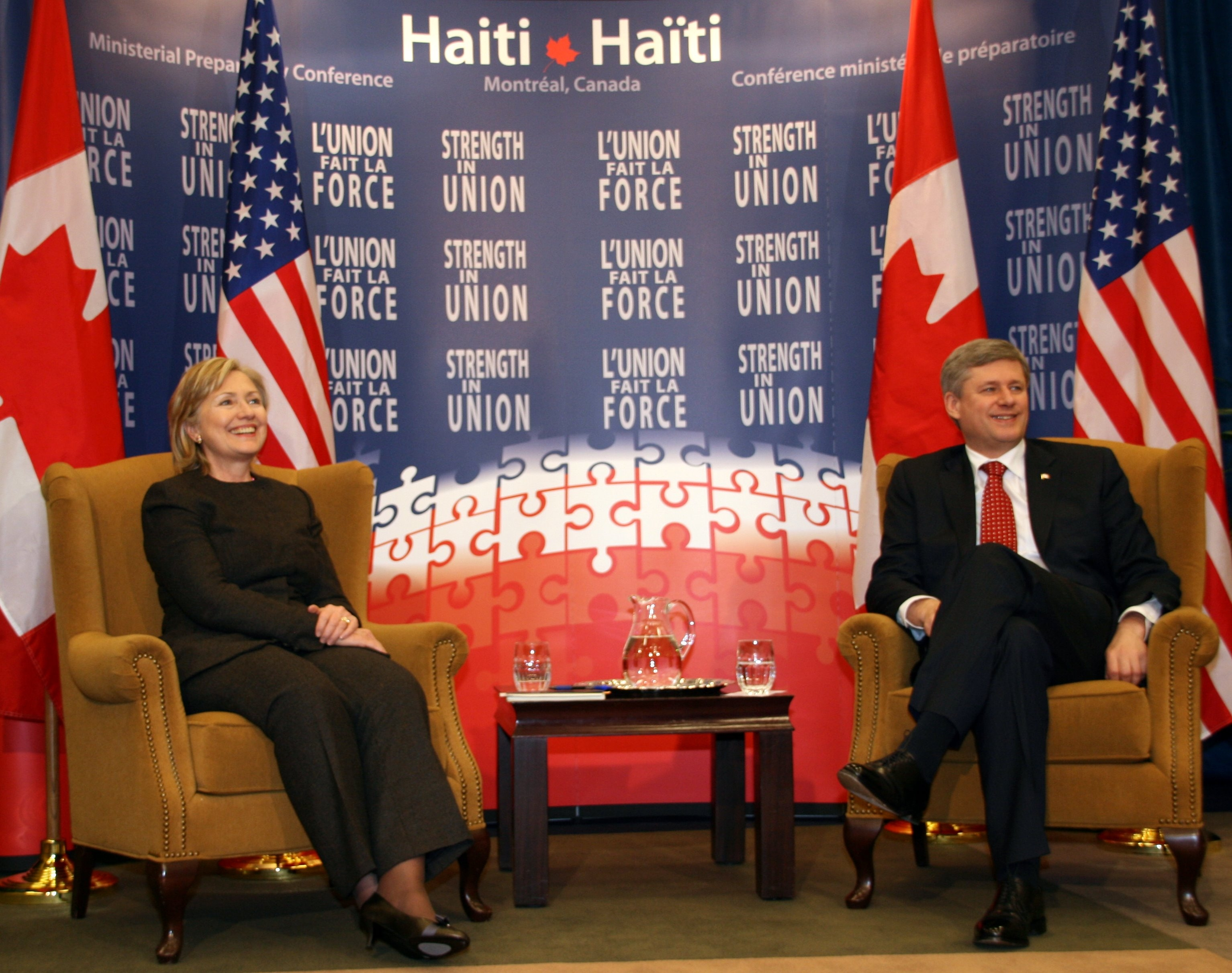
Former Canadian Prime Minister Stephen Harper and U.S. Secretary of State Hillary Clinton at the Haiti Ministerial Preparatory Conference addressing earthquake relief in Montreal, 25 January 2010

Canada's foreign aid is deeply related to multilateralism, with funding of official development assistance to help reduce global poverty and to advance sustainable development that promotes stability, as outlined by the United Nations Sustainable Development Goals. Canada has long supported humanitarian multilateral organizations including the World Bank Group, World Food Programme, UNICEF, Save the Children, and the Global Fund, alongside domestic based international aid organizations such as Nutrition International and Grand Challenges Canada.

In the 2023-2024 fiscal year, Canada spent $12 billion on foreign aid. Canada is the 6th-largest overall contributor of official development assistance and the fifteenth largest when measured as a proportion of its gross national income. In 2024, Canada's ODA reached approximately CAD$9.6 billion (US$7.4 billion), representing 0.34% of its GNI, making it a significant donor among OECD countries.

In the 2023-2024 fiscal year, Canada allocated $2.2 billion to multiple UN organizations including those related to peacekeeping, policing, research, training, climate change and humanitarian efforts such as medicine and food distribution. Canada also provided $2 billion in the form of loans to Ukraine for urgent payments needs in support of its economic stability, with a multi-year pledge totaling $6.5 billion in military support for the Russo-Ukrainian war.

A 2024 survey by Abacus Data indicated that Canadians generally support Canada's global engagement, particularly in providing international assistance. A separate poll by CanWaCH found that 81% of Canadians support Canada providing Official Development Assistance funding. Furthermore, 77% of Canadians believe it's important for Canada to help other countries in need.

Top 20 international assistance recipients (2023-2024)
Country	Bilaterally	Multilaterally	Total
Ukraine	$2,098M	$8M	$2,106M
Ethiopia	$127M	$69M	$195M
Haiti	$158M	$15M	$172M
South Africa	$152M	$13M	$165M
Bangladesh	$93M	$71M	$164M
Palestinian territories (West Bank & Gaza)	$134M	$17M	$151M
Congo	$69M	$80M	$149M
Mozambique	$81M	$60M	$141M
Tanzania	$73M	$68M	$141M
Mali	$95M	$20M	$115M
Ghana	$72M	$43M	$115M
South Sudan	$87M	$21M	$108M
Kenya	$65M	$41M	$107M
Nigeria	$33M	$73M	$106M
Pakistan	$35M	$68M	$104M
Senegal	$71M	$32M	$102M
Guyana	$93M	$7M	$100M
Uganda	$37M	$48M	$85M
Lebanon	$76M	$8M	$84M
Jordan	$75M	$6M	$81M

== Contemporary bilateralism ==
Canada maintains bilateral relations with numerous countries, characterized by diplomatic, economic, cultural, and security dimensions. One important difference between Canadian and American bilateral foreign policies has been in relations with communist governments. Canada established diplomatic relations with the People's Republic of China (13 October 1970) long before the Americans did (1 January 1979). It also has maintained trade and diplomatic relations with communist Cuba, despite pressures from the United States.

=== Largest trading partner ===
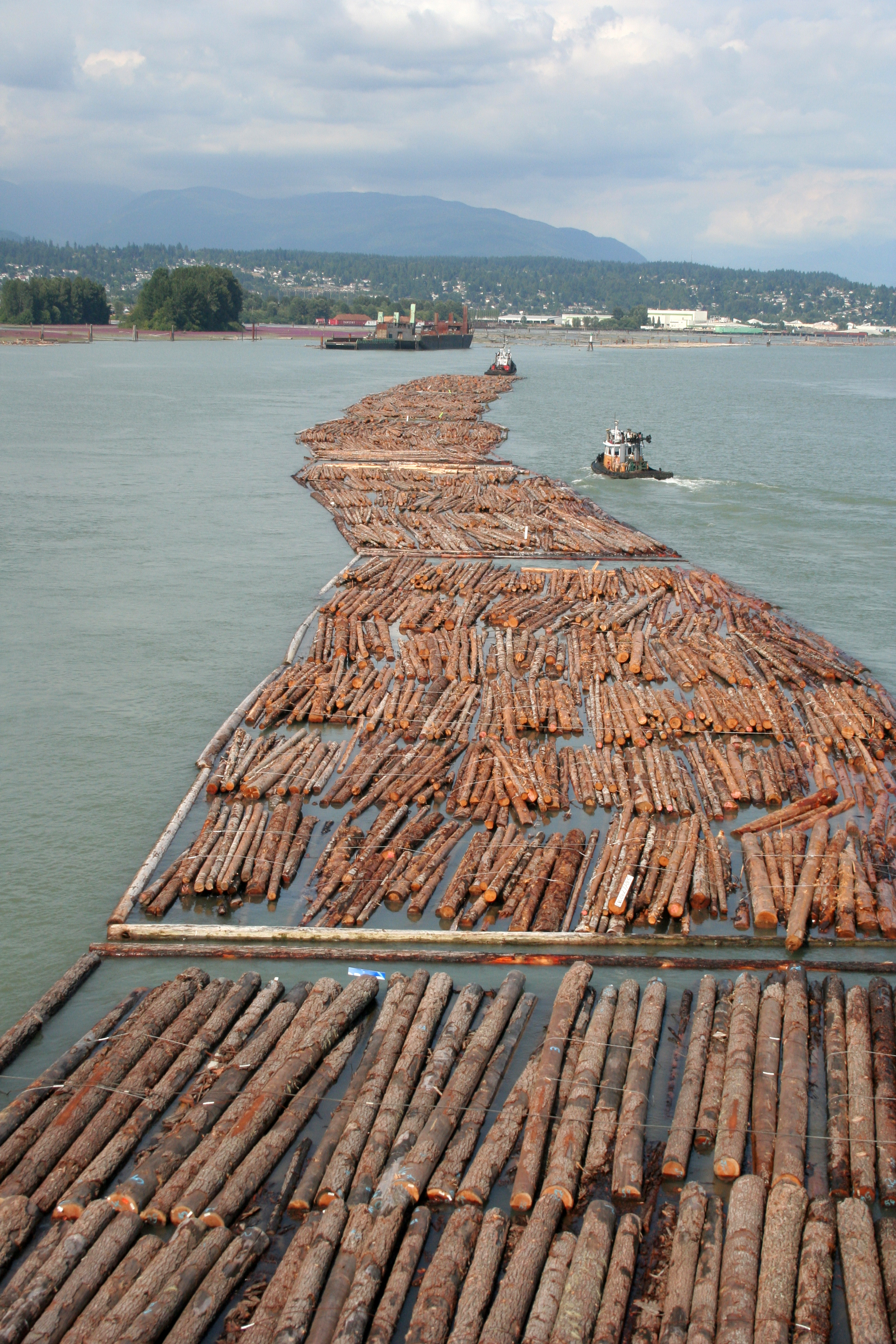
Timber being floated along the Fraser River in Vancouver. Trade disputes over softwood lumber have existed for decades between Canada in the United States. The conflict arose in 1982, and is one of the largest and most enduring trade disputes between the two nations.

The trade relationship between Canada and the United States is one of the largest in the world. In 2023, the goods and services trade between the two countries totalled US$916 billion with U.S. exports valued at US$440 billion and Canadian exports at US$476 billion, resulting in a United States US$36 billion trade deficit with Canada. In 2024, every day, around 328,000 people and $3.6 billion (US$2.6 billion) in goods and services crossed the Canada–U.S. border resulting in around $1.3 Trillion annually. Canada has historically held a trade deficit with the United States in every year since 1985 in net trade of goods, excluding services.

The close economic partnership was facilitated by shared economic interests and previously strong bilateral trade agreements. Cross-border projects, such as communications, highways, bridges, and pipelines, have led to shared energy networks and transportation systems. Despite these facts, historic and recurring disputes have included trade disagreements on natural resources such as softwood lumber, uncertainty over oil exports, illegal immigration, terrorism threats, and illicit drug trafficking. During President Donald Trump's second term beginning in 2025, the U.S. initiated a trade war with Canada and issued threats of annexation that have strained bilateral relations, with 2025 surveys showing increased and unprecedented distrust and negative views of the United States government by Canadians. Historically, a majority of Canadians have held mostly favorable views of the United States.

=== Free trade agreements ===
Canada Countries and territories with free trade agreements

Canada is a founding member of the World Trade Organization (WTO) since 1 January 1995, having been an original GATT member since 1 January 1948. Canada has concluded free trade agreements with 51 countries, recently with South Korea, which represents Canada's first FTA with a partner in the Asia-Pacific region. Canada has two other significant overseas multilateral trade agreements: the Comprehensive Economic and Trade Agreement (CETA) with the European Union and the 11-nation Comprehensive and Progressive Agreement for Trans-Pacific Partnership (CPTPP) with 10 other Pacific-Rim countries.

Canadian exports account for roughly 2.4% of the total value of goods exported worldwide, projected at US$23.926 trillion for 2024. Of that total trade, roughly 70% to 75% is done with countries that are part of free trade agreements with Canada—primarily the United States through the Canada–United States–Mexico Agreement being the largest.

Top 15 trading partners of Canada (2025)
United States	US$403.6 billion (72.5%)
United Kingdom	$33.4 billion (6%)
mainland China	$24.4 billion (4.4%)
Japan	$10.4 billion (1.9%)
Netherlands	$6.8 billion (1.2%)
Germany	$6.5 billion (1.2%)
Mexico	$6.3 billion (1.1%)
South Korea	$5.1 billion (0.9%)
France	$3.6 billion (0.6%)
Italy	$2.8 billion (0.5%)
India	$2.76 billion (0.5%)
Hong Kong	$2.71 billion (0.5%)
Belgium	$2.7 billion (0.5%)
Australia	$2.4 billion (0.4%)
Singapore	$2.3 billion (0.4%)

== Territorial and boundary disputes ==
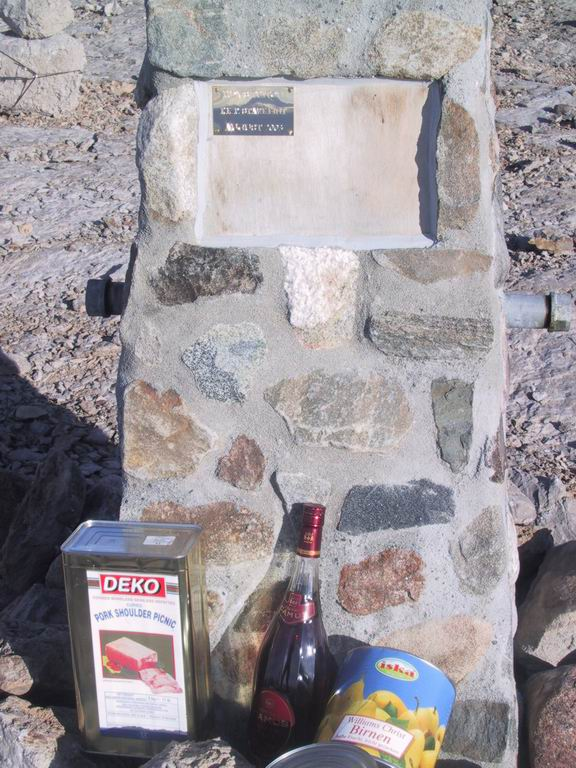
A bottle of cognac and cans of pork and fruit left by Danish forces on Hans Island in 2003

In addition to sharing the world's largest land border with the United States—spanning 8,891 kilometres (5,525 mi) (Note: 6,416 km (3,987 mi) with the contiguous 48 states and 2,475 km (1,538 mi) with Alaska)—Canada shares a short (1,280 metres (4,200 ft)) land border with Greenland (and hence the Kingdom of Denmark) to the northeast, on Hans Island, and a maritime boundary with France's overseas collectivity of Saint Pierre and Miquelon to the southeast.

Canada and the United States have negotiated the boundary between the countries over many years, with the last significant agreement having taken place in 1984 when the International Court of Justice ruled on the maritime boundary in the Gulf of Maine. Likewise, Canada and France had previously contested the maritime boundary surrounding the islands of St. Pierre and Miquelon, but accepted a 1992 International Court of Arbitration ruling.

The Whisky War was an amicable border dispute between the Kingdom of Denmark and Canada over Hans Island. Between 1973 and 2022, the island was under dispute between the two nations, although never in direct conflict or violence. Both countries agreed on a process in 2005 to resolve the issue, which was finally settled in 2022, resulting in the creation of a land border on the island between the two states.

Remaining disputes include managed maritime boundary disputes with the US (Dixon Entrance, Beaufort Sea, Strait of Juan de Fuca, Machias Seal Island).

=== Arctic disputes ===
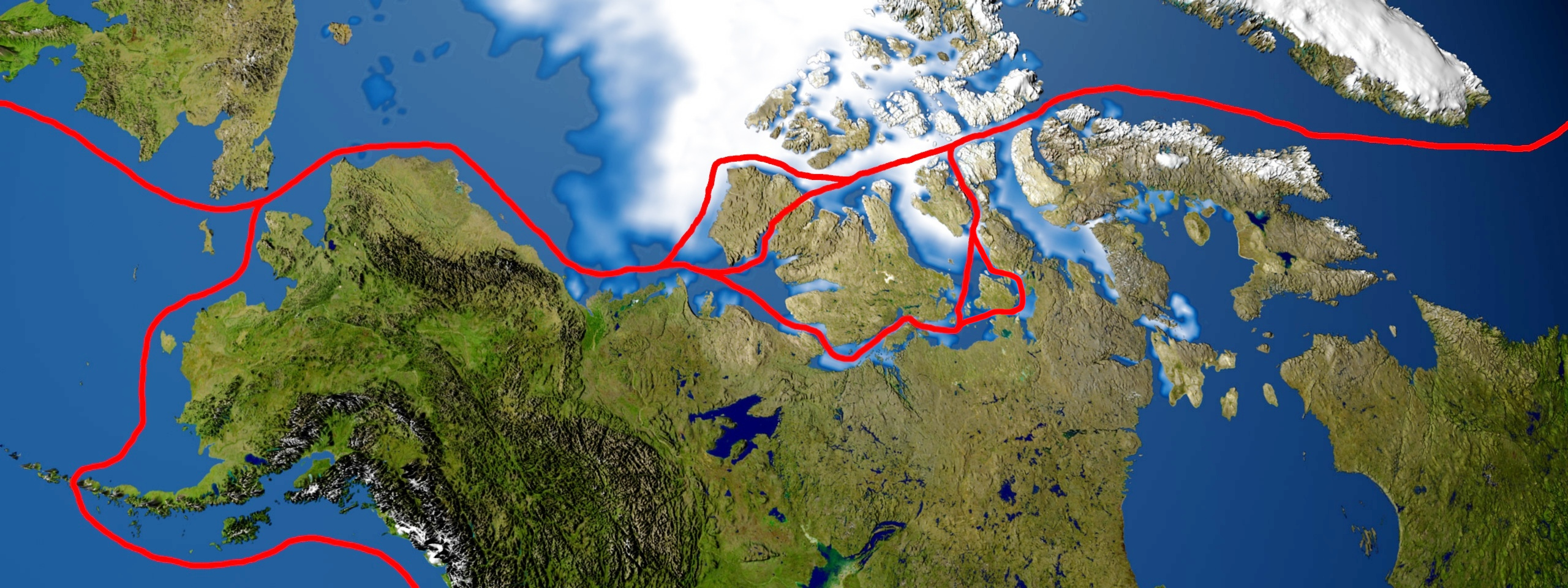
Northwest Passage routes

The Canadian government considers the Northwestern Passages part of Canadian Internal Waters, but the United States and various European countries maintain they are an international strait or transit passage, allowing free and unencumbered passage.

== Administration ==
In 1982, responsibility for trade was added with the creation of the Department of External Affairs and International Trade. In 1995, the name was changed to Department of Foreign Affairs and International Trade.

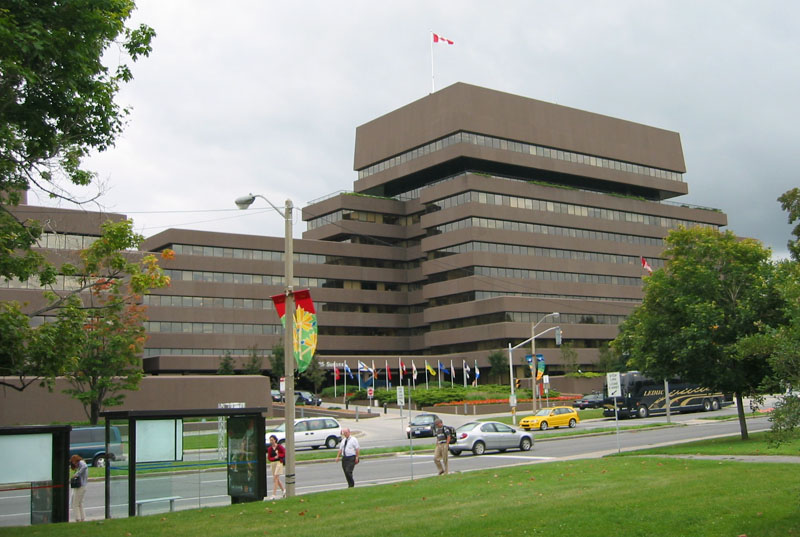
Global Affairs Canada's headquarters, the Lester B. Pearson Building in Ottawa

Canada has often carried out its foreign policy through coalitions and international organizations, and through the work of numerous federal institutions (e.g.: the Royal Canadian Mounted Police International Peace Operations Branch or deployments of personnel by the Correctional Service of Canada). Under the aegis of Canadian foreign policy, various departments and agencies conduct their own international relations and outreach activities. For example, the Canadian Forces and the Department of National Defence conduct defence diplomacy in support of national interests, including through the deployment of Canadian Defence Attachés, participation in bilateral and multilateral military forums (e.g., the System of Cooperation Among the American Air Forces), ship and aircraft visits, military training and cooperation, and other such outreach and relationship-building efforts.

Canada's international relations are the responsibility of the Department of Global Affairs, which is run by the Minister of Foreign Affairs. Traditionally the Prime Minister has played a prominent role in foreign affairs decisions. Foreign aid, formerly delivered through the Canadian International Development Agency, has been administered by DFATD since March 2013.

=== Federalism and foreign relations ===
The provinces have a high level of freedom to operate internationally, dating to 1886 and Quebec's first representative to France, Hector Fabre. Alberta has had representatives abroad, starting with Alberta House in London (37 Hill Street), since 1948, and British Columbia around 25 years before that. By 1984, Quebec had offices in ten countries including eight in the United States and three in other Canadian provinces while Ontario had thirteen delegations in seven countries.

== Diplomatic relations ==
List of countries which Canada maintains diplomatic relations with by date:

#	Country	Date
1	United Kingdom	1 July 1926
2	United States	18 February 1927
3	France	31 January 1928
4	Japan	31 January 1928
5	Belgium	3 January 1939
6	Netherlands	3 January 1939
7	Ireland	11 September 1939
8	New Zealand	11 September 1939
9	South Africa	11 September 1939
10	Australia	2 November 1939
11	Argentina	14 November 1940
12	Brazil	14 November 1940
13	Chile	9 October 1941
14	Serbia	9 February 1942
15	Norway	9 February 1942
16	Poland	9 February 1942
17	Russia	12 June 1942
18	Czech Republic	5 November 1942
19	Greece	5 November 1942
20	Sweden	2 July 1943
21	Mexico	30 January 1944
22	Peru	30 January 1944
23	Turkey	4 August 1944
24	Luxembourg	3 January 1945
25	Cuba	16 March 1945
26	India	6 April 1945
27	Switzerland	24 June 1945
28	Denmark	5 December 1945
29	Iceland	6 June 1947
30	Italy	13 August 1947
31	Finland	21 November 1947
32	Uruguay	11 March 1948
33	Philippines	4 December 1949
34	Pakistan	8 December 1949
35	Germany	8 November 1951
36	Portugal	18 January 1952
37	Austria	9 August 1952
38	Indonesia	9 October 1952
39	Colombia	6 November 1952
40	Venezuela	22 November 1952
41	Spain	21 February 1953
42	Sri Lanka	20 August 1953
43	Dominican Republic	22 April 1954
44	Haiti	12 May 1954
45	Egypt	28 July 1954
46	Israel	28 July 1954
47	Lebanon	26 August 1954
—	Iran (suspended)	9 January 1955
48	Tunisia	9 September 1957
49	Ghana	30 October 1957
50	Malaysia	29 March 1958
51	Myanmar	9 August 1958
52	Nigeria	1 October 1960
53	Costa Rica	20 January 1961
54	Paraguay	5 February 1961
55	Ecuador	March 1961
56	Sierra Leone	27 April 1961
57	Sudan	29 May 1961
58	Bolivia	May 1961
59	Iraq	27 June 1961
60	Honduras	June 1961
61	Nicaragua	June 1961
62	Panama	11 August 1961
63	Cyprus	14 August 1961
64	Guatemala	16 September 1961
65	Thailand	8 November 1961
66	Cameroon	7 December 1961
67	Tanzania	9 December 1961
68	El Salvador	29 December 1961
69	Chad	12 February 1962
70	Republic of the Congo	February 1962
71	Gabon	February 1962
72	Guinea	28 March 1962
73	Benin	27 April 1962
74	Burkina Faso	27 April 1962
75	Ivory Coast	27 April 1962
76	Niger	27 April 1962
77	Morocco	17 May 1962
78	Senegal	1 June 1962
79	Togo	7 June 1962
80	Democratic Republic of the Congo	12 June 1962
81	Central African Republic	13 June 1962
82	Jamaica	2 August 1962
83	Uganda	9 October 1962
84	Mali	7 January 1963
85	South Korea	14 January 1963
86	Trinidad and Tobago	28 February 1963
87	Malawi	November 1963
88	Kenya	5 May 1964
89	Hungary	11 June 1964
90	Zambia	24 October 1964
91	Jordan	23 December 1964
92	Malta	23 December 1964
93	Madagascar	7 January 1965
94	Nepal	18 January 1965
95	Kuwait	27 April 1965
96	Syria	20 May 1965
97	Ethiopia	13 October 1965
98	Algeria	12 November 1965
99	Rwanda	23 November 1965
100	Singapore	7 March 1966
101	Guyana	26 May 1966
102	Bulgaria	4 July 1966
103	Gambia	24 August 1966
104	Barbados	30 November 1966
105	Romania	4 April 1967
106	Lesotho	27 April 1967
107	Mauritius	27 August 1967
108	Somalia	23 June 1968
109	Afghanistan	17 July 1968
110	Libya	26 October 1968
111	Eswatini	29 October 1968
112	Mauritania	12 December 1968
113	Botswana	19 December 1968
114	Burundi	27 March 1969
—	Holy See	15 October 1969
115	Fiji	10 October 1970
116	China	13 October 1970
117	Liberia	24 February 1971
118	Tonga	11 June 1971
119	Samoa	11 June 1971
120	Bangladesh	14 February 1972
121	Bahamas	23 November 1972
122	Bahrain	2 February 1973
123	Saudi Arabia	8 May 1973
124	Vietnam	21 August 1973
125	Mongolia	30 November 1973
126	Oman	2 February 1974
127	Qatar	2 February 1974
128	United Arab Emirates	2 February 1974
129	Grenada	7 February 1974
130	Laos	15 June 1974
131	Mozambique	25 June 1975
132	Papua New Guinea	16 September 1975
133	Yemen	30 December 1975
134	Guinea-Bissau	26 March 1976
135	Seychelles	29 June 1976
136	Cape Verde	20 July 1976
137	Suriname	2 November 1976
138	Comoros	16 June 1977
139	Angola	3 February 1978
140	Djibouti	13 June 1978
141	Solomon Islands	7 July 1978
142	São Tomé and Príncipe	13 December 1978
143	Dominica	21 December 1978
144	Saint Lucia	22 February 1979
145	Kiribati	12 July 1979
146	Saint Vincent and the Grenadines	19 September 1979
147	Zimbabwe	19 April 1980
148	Vanuatu	30 July 1980
149	Equatorial Guinea	20 August 1980
150	Tuvalu	23 September 1980
151	Antigua and Barbuda	1 November 1981
152	Belize	24 November 1981
153	Maldives	14 December 1981
154	Saint Kitts and Nevis	11 October 1983
155	Brunei	7 May 1984
156	Albania	10 September 1987
157	Namibia	21 March 1990
158	Estonia	26 August 1991
159	Latvia	26 August 1991
160	Lithuania	26 August 1991
161	Cambodia	25 November 1991
162	Slovenia	7 January 1992
163	Ukraine	27 January 1992
164	Armenia	31 January 1992
165	Kyrgyzstan	17 February 1992
166	Moldova	20 February 1992
167	Tajikistan	28 March 1992
168	Uzbekistan	7 April 1992
169	Kazakhstan	10 April 1992
170	Turkmenistan	17 April 1992
171	Belarus	21 May 1992
172	Azerbaijan	10 July 1992
173	Georgia	23 July 1992
174	Slovakia	1 January 1993
175	Croatia	14 April 1993
176	Eritrea	28 October 1993
177	Bosnia and Herzegovina	14 December 1995
178	Andorra	14 February 1996
179	Liechtenstein	12 March 1996
180	North Macedonia	4 July 1996
181	Marshall Islands	14 August 1997
182	Palau	27 August 1997
183	Nauru	11 September 1997
184	San Marino	24 November 1997
185	Federated States of Micronesia	3 March 1998
—	North Korea (suspended)	6 February 2001
186	Timor-Leste	May 2002
187	Bhutan	25 June 2003
188	Montenegro	5 September 2006
189	Monaco	13 March 2008
—	Kosovo	7 April 2009
190	South Sudan	22 December 2011
—	Cook Islands	20 May 2023
—	Niue	12 September 2023

== Diplomatic missions ==
Canada has an extensive diplomatic network maintained by Global Affairs Canada.There are 179 consulates and almost 112 embassies of Canada located around the world. Canada hosts around 285 consulates, 110 foreign embassies and 9 high commissions in the country. Several other countries accredit their embassies and missions in the United States to Canada.

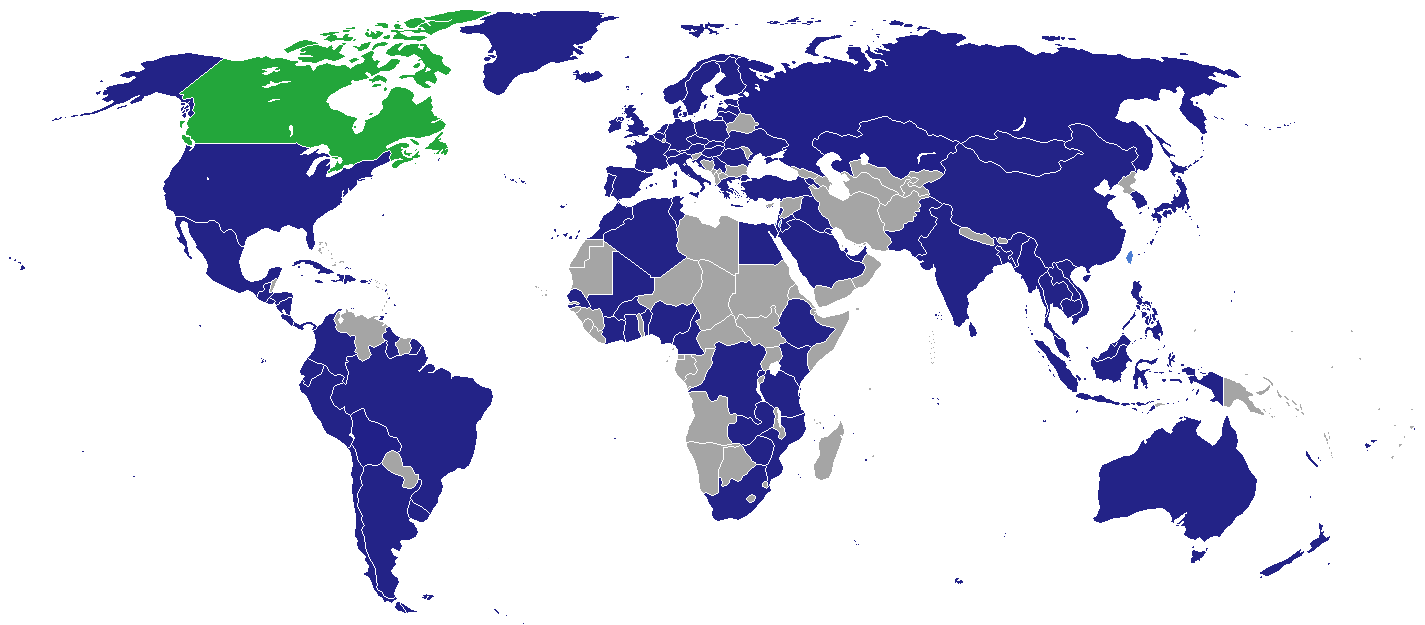
Diplomatic missions of Canada Countries that host a Canadian Embassy or High Commission Interests section and other representations Countries that do not host Canadian diplomatic missions Canada

== Multilateral relations ==
=== Canada’s relations within the Americas ===
Canada joined the Organization of American States (OAS) in 1990 and has been an active member, hosting the OAS General Assembly in Windsor, Ontario, in June 2000.

==== Canada–Caribbean relations ====
There are long-established relationships between Canada and the many states of the Caribbean or West Indies. These ties have been on-going throughout the history of both regions. Initially these relations were based on the policies of European colonial powers in the Americas. More recently, both Canada and most of the Caribbean islands have achieved self-government, putting their relations into a different phase. CARICOM diplomats have referred to Canada as a '"special friend" of the Caribbean at the regional and bilateral levels.' Ties exist in such plurality of organs such as: the Commonwealth of Nations, the Organisation internationale de la Francophonie, Organization of American States, ParlAmericas, the United Nations, and the World Trade Organization.

=== Canada–Commonwealth of Nations ===
Canada maintains close links to the United Kingdom and other Commonwealth realms, with which Canada has strong historic ties and shares a monarch. It also remains a member of the Commonwealth.

=== Canada–Europe and Canada–European Union relations ===
Relations between Canada and the European Union (EU), and its predecessors, date back to the 1950s. Since then, they have grown from a primarily economic relationship, into a partnership including cooperation on trade, foreign policy, security, defence, energy, and science. The EU has described Canada as "global strategic partner" and a "trusted partner for Europe", and the EU is Canada's second-largest trading partner. On 16 September, 2026, President of the European Commission Ursula von der Leyen invited Canada to become the first ever "associate member" of the European Union.

=== International organizations ===
Organization	Main article	Missions of Canada to:	Heads of mission from Canada
North Atlantic Treaty Organization	Canada–NATO relations	North Atlantic Council (Brussels)	List of permanent representatives of Canada to NATO
Organization of American States	Canada–Latin America relations	Organization of American States (Washington, D.C.)	List of permanent representatives and observers of Canada to the Organization of American States
United Nations	Canada and the United Nations	UN in New York; UN in Geneva; UN in Nairobi; UNESCO in Paris; FAO in Rome; ICAO in Montreal	List of ambassadors of Canada to the United Nations

== Bilateral relations ==
=== Africa ===
Country	Formal relations began	Notes
Algeria	1962	Main article: Algeria-Canada relations Algeria is Canada's top trading partner in Africa.: Algeria has an embassy in Ottawa and a consulate-general in Montreal.; Canada has an embassy in Algiers.; See also Embassy of Algeria in Ottawa, List of ambassadors of Canada to Algeria
Angola	1978	Angola had an embassy in Ottawa, which closed in 2018.; Canada is accredited to Angola from its embassy in Harare, Zimbabwe.; See also List of ambassadors of Canada to Angola
Burundi	1969	Both countries established diplomatic relations in 1969.; Both countries are full members of the Organisation internationale de la Francophonie.
Cameroon	7 December 1961	Cameroon and Canada have established diplomatic ties on 7 December 1961 with three agreements and four protocoles signed in 1965. Both countries share the use of English and French as the two official languages as well as memberships in the Organisation internationale de la Francophonie and The Commonwealth.: Cameroon has a high commission in Ottawa.; Canada has a high commission in Yaoundé.
Cape Verde	1976	Both countries established diplomatic relations in 1976.: Canada is accredited to Cape Verde from its embassy in Dakar, Senegal.; Cape Verde is accredited to Canada from its embassy in Washington, D.C., United States.
Comoros	1977	Both countries established diplomatic relations in 1977.; Canada is accredited to the Comoros from its high commission in Dar es Salaam, Tanzania.; Comoros is accredited to Canada from its embassy in Washington, D.C., United States.; Both countries are full members of the Organisation internationale de la Francophonie.
Democratic Republic of the Congo	1960	Main article: Canada–Democratic Republic of the Congo relations: Canada has an embassy in Kinshasa.; DR Congo has an embassy in Ottawa.
Egypt	1954	Main article: Canada–Egypt relations Both countries established embassies in their respective capitals in 1954.: Canada has had an embassy in Cairo.; Egypt has an embassy in Ottawa and a consulate-general in Montreal.
Equatorial Guinea	1968	Canada is accredited to Equatorial Guinea from its high commission in Abuja, Nigeria.; Equatorial Guinea is accredited to Canada from its Permanent Mission to the United Nations in New York City.
Eswatini	1968	Canada is accredited to Eswatini from its high commission in Maputo, Mozambique.; Eswatini is accredited to Canada from its embassy in Washington, D.C., United States.; Both countries are full members of Commonwealth of Nations.
Ethiopia	1956	Main article: Canada–Ethiopia relations: Canada has an embassy in Addis Ababa.; Ethiopia has an embassy in Ottawa.
Ivory Coast	1962	Main article: Canada–Ivory Coast relations: Canada has an embassy in Abidjan.; Ivory Coast has an embassy in Ottawa.
Kenya	1965	Main article: Canada–Kenya relations: Canada has a High Commission in Nairobi.; Kenya has a high commission in Ottawa.
Lesotho	1966	Main article: Canada–Lesotho relations: Both countries established diplomatic relations in 1966.; Canada accredited to Lesotho from its high commission in Pretoria, South Africa.; Lesotho has a high commission in Ottawa; Both countries are full members of Commonwealth of Nations.
Madagascar	1965	Main article: Canada–Madagascar relations: Canada is accredited to Madagascar from its high commission in Pretoria, South Africa.; Madagascar has an embassy in Ottawa.
Malawi	1973	Both countries established diplomatic relations in 1973.; Canada is accredited to Malawi from its high commission in Maputo, Mozambique.; Malawi is accredited to Canada from its embassy in Washington, D.C., United States.; Both countries are full members of the Commonwealth of Nations.
Mali	1978	Main article: Canada–Mali relations: Canada has an embassy in Bamako.; Mali has an embassy in Ottawa.; Canada has donated one billion dollars (US$, 2007) in bilateral development aid to Mali between 1962 and 2007, ranking it Mali's fifth-largest bilateral donor. Canada's development work in Mali has been chiefly in the railways, telecommunications and hydroelectricity sectors, in the management of government decentralization, in education and health.; Canada has contributed 9% towards the cost of the regional peace-keeping school, École de maintien de la paix Alioune Blondin Beye de Bamako, and has provided Canadian trainers to the school.; Two industrial, open-pit gold mines in Mali, Sadiola and Yatela, are partly owned by Canadian mining company IAMGOLD Corporation, and financed in part by Canada's public pension funds. Together, they contributed to one-half of Mali's industrial gold production during 1996–2007.; In 2005, there were 73 Canadian-owned mining properties in Mali. At least thirteen junior Canadian mining companies held exploration licences in Mali in 2009.; Over the period 2001–2005, Canadian mining assets in Mali represented 31% of Mali's total stock of foreign direct investment.; Malian-Canadian immigrants made up 0.0027% of the Canadian population in 2006.
Morocco	1956	Main article: Canada–Morocco relations: Canada has an embassy in Rabat.; Morocco has an embassy in Ottawa and a consulate-general in Montreal.; Both countries are full members of the Francophonie.; There are 100,000 people of Moroccan descent living in Canada.; Canadian Ministry of Foreign Affairs and International Trade about relations with Morocco
Mozambique	1975	Main article: Canada–Mozambique relations: Canada has a high commission in Maputo.; Mozambique is accredited to Canada from its embassy in Washington, D.C., United States.
Namibia	1977	Main article: Canada–Namibia relations: Canada is accredited to Namibia from its high commission in Pretoria, South Africa.; Namibia is accredited to Canada from its embassy in Washington, D.C., United States.
Nigeria	1 October 1960	Canada has a high commission in Abuja and a deputy high commission on Lagos.; Nigeria has a high commission in Ottawa.; Both countries are full members of the Commonwealth of Nations.; Canadian Ministry of Foreign Affairs and International Trade about relations with Nigeria
Senegal	1962	Main article: Canada–Senegal relations: Canada has an embassy in Dakar.; Senegal has an embassy in Ottawa.
South Africa	1939	Main article: Canada–South Africa relations Canada established diplomatic relations with numerous countries, including South Africa, as World War II broke out.: Canada has a high commission in Pretoria.; South Africa has a high commission in Ottawa.
Tunisia	1957	Since May 1966, Canada has an embassy in Tunis.; Since September 1969, Tunisia has an embassy in Ottawa and a consulate in Montreal.; Both countries are full members of the Francophonie.; Canadian Ministry of Foreign Affairs and International Trade about relations with Tunisia; Tunisian Ministry of Foreign Affairs about relations with Canada (in French only)
Zambia	1964	Canada has an office of the high commission in Lusaka.; Zambia has a high commission in Ottawa.; Canada currently has a development assistance program in Zambia, which is focused on the health sector to provide Zambians with equal access to quality health care. Canada and Zambia are currently in the process of negotiating a Foreign Investment Promotion and Protection Agreement.

=== Americas ===
Country	Formal relations began	Notes
Argentina	April 1940	See Argentina–Canada relations Canada's first ambassador to Buenos Aires, began his assignment in 1945. In 2011 Canada's largest imports were decorative items gold, wines and Iron and steel pipes. Canada's largest exports to Argentina were Energy-related products; telephones sets, and fertilizers. Bilateral trade in 2014 was $2.19 billion. Both countries are members of the Organization of American States and the Cairns Group.: Argentina has an embassy in Ottawa and consulates-general in Montreal, Toronto and Vancouver.; Canada has an embassy in Buenos Aires.
Antigua and Barbuda	1981	Antigua & Barbuda and Canada are two of fifteen commonwealth realms, members of: the Commonwealth of Nations, the Organization of American States, and the United Nations. Both countries established diplomatic relations in 1967.: Antigua and Barbuda is accredited to Canada from its embassy in Washington, D.C., United States and has a consulate-general in Toronto.; The Canadian High Commission in Bridgetown, Barbados is accredited to Antigua and Barbuda.
The Bahamas	1973	The Commonwealth of The Bahamas and Canada are two of fifteen commonwealth realms, members of: the Commonwealth of Nations, the Organization of American States, and the United Nations.: The Canadian High Commission in Kingston, Jamaica is accredited to The Bahamas. Canada has an honorary consul in Nassau.; The Bahamas is represented by their High Commission in Ottawa.; Canadian Ministry of Foreign Affairs and International Trade about relations with The Bahamas
Barbados	30 November 1966	Main article: Barbados–Canada relations Barbados and Canada are both members of: the Commonwealth of Nations, the Organization of American States, and the United Nations. In 1907, the Government of Canada opened a Trade Commissioner Service to the Caribbean region located in Bridgetown, Barbados. Following Barbadian independence from the United Kingdom in November 1966, the Canadian High Commission was established in Bridgetown, Barbados in September 1973. There is a Barbadian High Commission in Ottawa and a Barbadian Consulate in Toronto. The relationship between both nations today partly falls within the larger context of Canada–Caribbean relations.
Belize	November 1981	Main article: Belize–Canada relations The nations of Belize and Canada are two of fifteen commonwealth realms, members of: the Commonwealth of Nations, the Organization of American States, and the United Nations.: Belize is accredited to Canada from its embassy in Washington, D.C., United States.; Canada is accredited to Belize from its embassy in Guatemala City, Guatemala.
Brazil	May 1941	Main article: Brazil–Canada relations: Brazil has an embassy in Ottawa and consulates-general in Montreal, Toronto and Vancouver.; Canada has an embassy in Brasília and consulates-general in Rio de Janeiro and São Paulo.; See also Embassy of Brazil in Ottawa, List of Brazilian ambassadors to Canada
Chile	1941	Main article: Canada–Chile relations Canada and Chile are both members of: the Asia-Pacific Economic Cooperation, the Organization of American States, and the United Nations. Since 1997 Canada and Chile's trade relations have been governed by the Canada-Chile Free Trade Agreement, Chile's first full free trade agreement and Canada's first with a Latin American nation.: Canada has an embassy in Santiago.; Chile has an embassy in Ottawa and consulates-general in Montreal, Toronto and Vancouver.
Colombia	January 1953	Main article: Canada–Colombia relations: Canada has an embassy in Bogotá.; Colombia has an embassy in Ottawa and consulates-general in Montreal and Toronto.; Both countries are full members of the Organization of American States.
Cuba	1945	Main article: Canada–Cuba relations Canada has maintained consistently cordial relations with Cuba, in spite of considerable pressure from the United States, and the island is also one of the most popular travel destinations for Canadian citizens. Canada-Cuba relations can be traced back to the 18th century, when vessels from the Atlantic provinces of Canada traded codfish and beer for rum and sugar. Cuba was the first country in the Caribbean selected by Canada for a diplomatic mission. Official diplomatic relations were established in 1945, when Emile Vaillancourt, a noted writer and historian, was designated Canada's representative in Cuba. Canada and Mexico were the only two countries in the hemisphere to maintain uninterrupted diplomatic relations with Cuba following the Cuban Revolution in 1959.: Canada has an embassy in Havana and honorary consuls in Varadero and Guardalavaca.; Cuba has an embassy in Ottawa and consulates in Montreal and Toronto.
Dominica	1979	Canada and the Commonwealth of Dominica are members of the Commonwealth of Nations, the Organization of American States, the Organisation internationale de la Francophonie, and the United Nations.: Canada is accredited to Dominica from its high commission in Bridgetown, Barbados.; Dominica is accredited to Canada from its embassy in Washington, D.C., United States.
El Salvador	29 December 1961	Main article: Canada–El Salvador relations: Canada has an embassy in San Salvador.; El Salvador has an embassy in Ottawa and consulates-general in Calgary, Montreal, Toronto, Vancouver and Winnipeg.
Greenland		Further information: Canada-Denmark relations Greenland (within the Kingdom of Denmark), and Canada are connected through indigenous culture and language, which is shared by the Inuit across Arctic Canada and also Alaska. Both nations maintain cooperation and good relations through the Arctic Council and under the auspices of the Arctic Coastal States. In addition, both act as close partners at: Inuit Circumpolar Conference (ICC), Nordic Council, Nordic Atlantic Cooperation, and the West Nordic Foundation. Through the expansion of self-government in Greenland since 1979 both nations, but especially the administration at Nuuk have attached strategic importance to their bilateral relations with Canada in the areas of the politics, economic and trade relations and in the fields of education, science and culture.: Canada maintains an embassy in Copenhagen, Denmark, and a consulate in capital city Nuuk.; Greenland maintains a non-resident office in Washington, D.C., with a Head of Representation.
Grenada	7 February 1974	Main article: Canada–Grenada relations Canada and Grenada are two of fifteen commonwealth realms, members of: the Commonwealth of Nations, the Organization of American States, and the United Nations.: Canada is accredited to Grenada from its high commission in Bridgetown, Barbados.; Grenada is accredited to Canada from its embassy in Washington, D.C., United States.
Guatemala	16 September 1961	Main article: Canada–Guatemala relations: Canada has an embassy in Guatemala City.; Guatemala has an embassy in Ottawa and consulates-general in Montreal, Toronto and Vancouver.
Guyana	1964	Main article: Canada–Guyana relations Canada and the Co-Operative Republic of Guyana are members of the Commonwealth of Nations, the Organization of American States, and the United Nations.: In 1964 Canada opened the Commission of Canada in Georgetown, Guyana. In 1966 it became a Canadian High Commission.; There is a Guyanese High Commission in Ottawa and a consulate in Toronto.; Canada and Guyana have strong ties through the Commonwealth of Nations.; The Royal Canadian Mounted Police and the Guyanese police work closely to help with drug, and human smuggling.
Haiti	1954	Main article: Canada–Haiti relations Canada and Haiti are both members of the Organisation internationale de la Francophonie, the Organization of American States, and the United Nations.: Canada has an embassy in Port-au-Prince.; Haiti has an embassy in Ottawa and a consulate-general in Montreal.
Honduras	1961	Canada has an embassy in Tegucigalpa.; Honduras has an embassy in Ottawa and a consulate-general in Montreal.
Jamaica	1962	Main article: Canada–Jamaica relations Canada and Jamaica are two of fifteen commonwealth realms, members of: the Commonwealth of Nations, the Organization of American States, and the United Nations.: Since 4 March 1963, Canada has a high commission in Kingston.; Jamaica has a high commission in Ottawa.
Mexico	January 1944	Main article: Canada–Mexico relations Despite the fact that historic ties between the two nations have been coldly dormant, relations between Canada and Mexico have positively changed in recent years; seeing as both countries brokered the North American Free Trade Agreement. Although on different sides of the Cold War spectrum (Canada was a member of NATO while Mexico was in the Non-Aligned Movement, the two countries were still allies in World War II.): Canada has an embassy in Mexico City, a consulate-general in Monterrey and a consulate in Guadalajara, plus consular agency offices in seven resort communities.; Mexico has an embassy in Ottawa, with consulates general in Montreal, Toronto and Vancouver, and consulates in Calgary and Leamington.; Both countries are members of USMCA, APEC, OECD and the G20.; See also Embassy of Mexico, Ottawa, List of ambassadors of Canada to Mexico
Panama	1961	Main article: Canada–Panama relations: Canada has an embassy in Panama City.; Panama has an embassy in Ottawa and consulates general in Montreal and Toronto.; Both countries are full members of the Organization of American States.; Canadian Ministry of Foreign Affairs and International Trade about relations with Panama
Paraguay	1961	Canada is accredited to Paraguay from its embassy in Buenos Aires, Argentina and maintains an honorary consul in Asunción.; Paraguay has an embassy in Ottawa.; Both countries are full members of the Cairns Group and the Organization of American States.; Canadian Ministry of Foreign Affairs and International Trade about relations with Paraguay; Paraguayan Ministry of Foreign Relations about relations with Canada
Peru	21 October 1944	Main article: Canada–Peru relations: Canada has an embassy in Lima.; Peru has an embassy in Ottawa and three consulates-general in Montreal, Toronto and Vancouver.; Both countries are full members of the Asia-Pacific Economic Cooperation, of the Cairns Group and of the Organization of American States.; The Canadian government announced in February 2009 that it was adding Peru to its list of preferred countries to receive foreign aid. This list includes 18 countries and the West Bank and Caribbean.; Canadian Ministry of Foreign Affairs and Trade about the relation with Peru; Peruvian Ministry of Foreign Relations about the relation with Canada (in Spanish only)
Trinidad and Tobago	31 August 1962	Main article: Canada–Trinidad and Tobago relations Canada and the Republic of Trinidad and Tobago are members of the Commonwealth of Nations, the Organization of American States, and the United Nations.: Canada has a high commission in Port of Spain.; Trinidad and Tobago has a high commission in Ottawa.
United States	18 February 1927	Main article: Canada–United States relations Relations between Canada and the United States span more than two centuries, marked by a shared British colonial heritage, conflict during the early years of the U.S., and the eventual development of one of the most successful international relationships in the modern world. The most serious breach in the relationship was the War of 1812, which saw an American invasion of then British North America and counter invasions from British-Canadian forces. The border was demilitarized after the war and, apart from minor raids, has remained peaceful. Military collaboration began during the World Wars and continued throughout the Cold War, despite Canadian doubts about certain American policies. A high volume of trade and migration between the U.S. and Canada has generated closer ties, despite continued Canadian fears of being overwhelmed by its neighbour, which is ten times larger in population, wealth and debt. Canada and the United States are currently the world's largest trading partners, share the world's longest shared border, and have significant interoperability within the defence sphere.: See also Embassy of the United States in Ottawa, Embassy of Canada in Washington, United States Ambassador to Canada, List of ambassadors of Canada to the United States
Uruguay	January 1953	Main article: Canada–Uruguay relations: Canada has an embassy in Montevideo.; Uruguay has an embassy in Ottawa, and consulates general in Montreal and Toronto, and an honorary consul in Vancouver.
Venezuela	January 1953	Main article: Canada–Venezuela relations In February 1948 there was a Canadian consulate-general in Caracas and a Venezuelan consulate-general in Montreal. In that year the Venezuelan Consul General, on behalf of the government of Venezuela, made a rapprochement with Canada in order to open direct diplomatic representations between the two countries; but the Canadian government delayed the opening of a diplomatic mission in Venezuela because of the lack of enough suitable personnel to staff a Canadian mission in Venezuela and the impossibility of Canada beginning a representation in Venezuela in that year without considering a policy of expansion of Canadian representation abroad. In the interest of protecting Canadian trade with Venezuela and considering the difficulties for business in being without a Canadian representation in Caracas, Canada was pushed to accept the Venezuelan offer of exchanging diplomatic missions. Finally Canada elevated the former office of the Canadian Consulate General in Caracas to the category of embassy in 1953. Venezuela established an embassy in Canada in 1952. Since then there have been good commercial relations between the two countries, especially in technology, oil and gas industry, telecommunications and others. In June 2019, Canada closed its embassy in Caracas due to diplomatic visas unable to be renewed under President Maduro's government.: Venezuela has an embassy in Ottawa and consulates-general in Montreal, Toronto and Vancouver.

=== Asia ===
Country	Formal relations began	Notes
Afghanistan	1960s 1968 (officially)	See Afghanistan–Canada relations The Canadian government announced in February 2009 that it was adding Afghanistan to its list of preferred countries to receive foreign aid.: Afghanistan has an embassy in Ottawa.; Canada had an embassy in Kabul.; See also: War in Afghanistan, Embassy of Canada in Kabul, List of ambassadors of Canada to Afghanistan
Armenia	1992	See Armenia–Canada relations: Armenia has an embassy in Ottawa.; Canada has an embassy in Yerevan.
Azerbaijan	1992	See Azerbaijan–Canada relations: Azerbaijan has an embassy in Ottawa.; Canada is accredited to Azerbaijan from its embassy in Ankara, Turkey.
Bangladesh	1972	See Bangladesh–Canada relations: Bangladesh has a high commission in Ottawa.; Canada has a high commission in Dhaka.
Brunei	1984-05-07	See Brunei–Canada relations: Brunei has its high commission in Ottawa.; Canada has its high commission in Bandar Seri Begawan.; Both countries are full members of the Commonwealth of Nations
China	1970-10-13	See Canada–China relations Since 2003, China has emerged as Canada's second largest trading partner, passing Britain and Japan. China now accounts for approximately six percent of Canada's total world trade. According to a recent study by the Fraser Institute, China replaced Japan as Canada's third-largest export market in 2007, with CA$9.3 billion flowing into China in 2007. Between 1998 and 2007, exports to China grew by 272 percent, but only represented about 1.1 per cent of China's total imports. In 2007, Canadian imports of Chinese products totalled C$38.3 billion. Between 1998 and 2007, imports from China grew by almost 400 percent. Leading commodities in the trade between Canada and China include chemicals, metals, industrial and agricultural machinery and equipment, wood products, and fish products. Trade tariffs and other incidents in 2019, including the arrest of top Huawei executive Meng Wanzhou have frozen relations between the two countries. In July 2019, the UN ambassadors from 22 nations, including Canada, signed a joint letter to the UNHRC condemning China's mistreatment of the Uyghurs as well as its mistreatment of other minority groups, urging the Chinese government to close the Xinjiang re-education camps.: Canada has an embassy in Beijing and consulates-general in Chongqing, Guangzhou, Hong Kong and Shanghai.; China has an embassy in Ottawa and consulates-general in Calgary, Montreal, Toronto and Vancouver.; See also Embassy of China in Ottawa, List of ambassadors of Canada to China
Georgia	1992-07-23	See Canada–Georgia relations: Canada is accredited to Georgia from its embassy in Ankara, Turkey and maintains an honorary consul in Tbilisi.; Georgia has an embassy in Ottawa.; Canadian Ministry of Foreign Affairs and International Trade about the relations with Georgia; Georgian Ministry of Foreign Affairs about the relations with Canada
India	1947-08-15	See Canada–India relations In 2004, bilateral trade between India and Canada was at about C$2.45 billion. However, India's Smiling Buddha nuclear test led to connections between the two countries being frozen, with allegations that India broke the terms of the Colombo Plan. Although Jean Chrétien and Roméo LeBlanc both visited India in the late 1990s, relations were again halted after the Pokhran-II tests. In 2023, Justin Trudeau accused the Indian government of involvement in the killing of a Sikh-Canadian leader, Hardeep Singh Nijjar on Canadian soil. "Any involvement of a foreign government in the killing of a Canadian citizen on Canadian soil is an unacceptable violation of our sovereignty," the Prime Minister stated to the House of Commons.: Canada has a high commission in New Delhi and has a consulate-general in Mumbai.; India has a high commission in Ottawa and consulates-general in Toronto and Vancouver.
Indonesia	1952	See Canada–Indonesia relations: Canada has an embassy in Jakarta.; Indonesia has an embassy in Ottawa and consulates-general in Toronto and Vancouver.; Both countries are full members of the G-20 major economies, of the Cairns Group and of the Asia-Pacific Economic Cooperation.; Canadian Ministry of Foreign Affairs and International Trade about relations with Indonesia
Iran	1955 ended 2012	See Canada–Iran relations Canadian-Iranian relations date back to 1955, up to which point the Canadian Consular and Commercial Affairs in Iran was handled by the British Embassy. A Canadian diplomatic mission was constructed in Tehran in 1959 and raised to embassy status in 1961. Due to rocky relations after the Iranian Revolution, Iran did not establish an embassy in Canada until 1991 when its staff, which had been living in a building on Roosevelt Avenue in Ottawa's west end, moved into 245 Metcalfe Street in the Centretown neighbourhood of Ottawa which was upgraded to embassy status, however in 2012, Canada severed all diplomatic ties with Iran in regard to Iran's treatment of human rights and belligerent foreign policy. The CRGI is designated a terrorist organization in 2024.: Canada has an interest section in Tehran.; Iran has an interest section in Ottawa.
Iraq	1961-02 to 1991–12; 2005–06	See Canada–Iraq relations, Canada and the Iraq War: Canada has an embassy in Baghdad and a consulate-general in Erbil.; Iraq has an embassy in Ottawa and consulates-general in Montreal and Mississauga.
Israel	1950	See Canada–Israel relations At the United Nations in 1947, Canada was one of the thirty-three countries that voted in favour of the creation of a Jewish homeland. Canada delayed granting de facto recognition to Israel until December 1948, and finally gave full de jure recognition to the new nation on 11 May 1949, only after it was admitted into the United Nations (UN). A week later, Avraham Harman became Israel's first consul general in Canada. In September 1953, the Canadian Embassy opened in Tel Aviv and Israeli Ambassador to Canada, Michael Comay, was appointed, although a non-resident Canadian Ambassador to Israel was not appointed until 1958.: Canada has an embassy in Tel Aviv.; Israel has an embassy in Ottawa and consulates-general in Montreal and Toronto.; See also: Embassy of Israel in Ottawa, List of ambassadors of Canada to Israel
Japan	1928-12	See Canada–Japan relations The two countries enjoy an amicable companionship in many areas; diplomatic relations between both countries officially began in 1950 with the opening of the Japanese consulate in Ottawa. In 1929, Canada opened its Tokyo legation, the first in Asia; and in that same year, Japan its Ottawa consulate to legation form.: Canada has an embassy in Tokyo and a consulate-general in Nagoya.; Japan has an embassy in Ottawa and consulates-general in Calgary, Montreal, Toronto and Vancouver.; See also: Embassy of Japan in Ottawa, Embassy of Canada in Tokyo, List of ambassadors of Canada to Japan
Kazakhstan	1992	See Canada–Kazakhstan relations: Canada has an embassy in Astana and a consulate in Almaty.; Kazakhstan has an embassy in Ottawa and a consulate in Toronto.; Canada has designated Kazakhstan as a priority emerging market for bilateral trade.
Kyrgyzstan	1992	Both countries established diplomatic relations in 1992.: Canada is accredited to Kyrgyzstan from its embassy in Nur-Sultan, Kazakhstan.; Kyrgyzstan is accredited to Canada from its embassy in Washington, D.C., United States.
Lebanon	1954	See Canada–Lebanon relations Canada established diplomatic relations with Lebanon in 1954, when Canada deployed "Envoy Extraordinaire" to Beirut. In 1958, Canada sent its first ambassador. The embassy was closed in 1985 and reopened in January 1995. Lebanon opened a consulate in Ottawa in 1946. A consulate-general replaced the consulate in 1949, and it was upgraded to full embassy status in 1958.: Canada has an embassy in Beirut.; Lebanon has an embassy in Ottawa and a consulate-general in Montreal.
Malaysia	1957-08-31	See Canada–Malaysia relations: Canada has a High Commission in Kuala Lumpur; Malaysia has a High Commission in Ottawa.; Both countries are full members of the Commonwealth of Nations.; Canada's trade relationship with Malaysia includes commerce across several sectors.
Mongolia	1973-11-30	See Canada–Mongolia relations: Canada is represented in Mongolia through its embassy in Ulaanbaatar.; Mongolia has an embassy in Ottawa.; Though Canada and Mongolia established diplomatic ties in 1973, ad hoc linkages and minor activities occurred between the two countries mainly through the Canada-Mongolia Society, which disbanded in 1980. When Mongolia formed a democratic government in 1991 after the collapse of the Soviet Union, Canada began to support Mongolia with donor activities through the International Development Research Centre, Canadian International Development Agency and several non-governmental organizations.
North Korea	2001-02-06 to 2010-03-26	See Canada–North Korea relations Canada and North Korea share very little trade due to the destabilizing element North Korea has caused in the Asia Pacific region. Canada is represented by the Canadian Ambassador resident in Seoul, and North Korea is represented through its office at the UN in New York City.
Pakistan	1947-08-15	See Canada–Pakistan relations: Canada has a high commission in Islamabad and consulate in Karachi.; Pakistan has a high commission in Ottawa and consulates-general in Montreal, Toronto and Vancouver.; Both countries are full members of the Commonwealth of Nations.; The value of the bilateral trade relationship between Pakistan and Canada was close to C$694 million in 2007.; There are an estimated 300,000 Pakistanis living in Canada.; See also Pakistani Canadian, High Commission of Pakistan in Ottawa
Philippines	1949	See Canada–Philippines relations: Canada has an embassy in Manila and an honorary consul in Cebu City.; Philippines has an embassy in Ottawa, two consulates general in Toronto and Vancouver, and honorary consuls (from west to east) in Calgary, Edmonton, Winnipeg, Charlottetown, Halifax and St. John's.; Both countries are full members of the Cairns Group and of the Asia-Pacific Economic Cooperation.; There are 411,000 people of Filipino descent living in Canada.; Canadian Ministry of Foreign Affairs and International Trade about relations with Philippines
Qatar		See Canada–Qatar relations: Canada has an embassy in Doha.; Qatar has an embassy in Ottawa.
Saudi Arabia	1973-05	See Canada–Saudi Arabia relations Saudi Arabia is Canada's second largest trade partner among the seven countries of the Arabian Peninsula, totalling more than $2 billion in trade in 2005, nearly double its value in 2002, trade totalled $3.8 in 2014. Canada chiefly imports petroleum, and oil from Saudi Arabia, while the largest exporting good are such as cereals, railway/tramway equipment; machinery equipment and paper in 2010.: Canada has an embassy in Riyadh.; Saudi Arabia has an embassy in Ottawa.; See also Embassy of Saudi Arabia in Ottawa
Singapore	1965-12-15	See Canada–Singapore relations: Canada has a high commission in Singapore.; Singapore is represented in Canada through its embassy to the United Nations in New York City and through a consulate-general in Vancouver.; Both countries are full members of the Asia-Pacific Economic Cooperation and of the Commonwealth of Nations.; Canadian Ministry of Foreign Affairs and International Trade about relations with Singapore
South Korea	1963-01-14	See Canada–South Korea relations: Canadian soldiers participated in the defence of South Korea during the Korean War.; Canada has an embassy in Seoul.; South Korea has an embassy in Ottawa and consulates-general in Montreal, Toronto and Vancouver.; Both countries are full members of the APEC, the OECD and the G20.; In 2015 both countries signed the Canada-Korea Free Trade Agreement (CKFTA), which was Canada's first bilateral free trade agreement with an Indo-Pacific partner.
Taiwan	1949–1970 official 1991-quasi-official	See Canada–Taiwan relations; The Government of Canada has a representative office in Taipei dealing with quasi-official affairs.; Taiwan has an Economic and Cultural Office in Canada in Ottawa, consulate offices in Toronto and Vancouver. Taiwan External Trade Development Council also has offices in Toronto and Vancouver.; Both countries are full members of the Asia-Pacific Economic Cooperation.
Tajikistan	1992	Both countries established diplomatic relations in 1992.: Canada is accredited to Tajikistan from its embassy in Nur-Sultan, Kazakhstan.; Tajikistan is accredited to Canada from it embassy in Washington, D.C., United States.
Thailand	1947	See Canada-Thailand relations: Canada has an embassy in Bangkok and a consulate in Chiang Mai.; Thailand has an embassy in Ottawa, consulates general in Toronto, Vancouver, Calgary, Edmonton and Montreal, and Thai Trade Centre Offices in Vancouver and Toronto.; Both countries are full members of the Asia-Pacific Economic Cooperation and Canada is a member of the ASEAN Regional Forum.; Canadian Department of Foreign Affairs and International Trade about relations with Thailand
Turkey	1943	See Canada–Turkey relations: Canada has an embassy in Ankara and a Consulate General in Istanbul.; Turkey has an embassy in Ottawa and Consulate Generals in Montreal, Toronto and Vancouver.; Both countries are members of OECD, G20, NATO and WTO.; There are direct flights from Istanbul to Toronto, Montreal and Vancouver (starting in December 2020).; Around 65,000 people of Turkish origin live in Canada.; Trade volume between the two countries was US$2.46 billion in 2019.
United Arab Emirates		See Canada–United Arab Emirates relations: Canada has an embassy in Abu Dhabi and a consulate-general in Dubai.; United Arab Emirates has an embassy in Ottawa and a consulate-general in Toronto.; On 24 July, 2026, Canada and the United Arab Emirates concluded negotiations for the Canada–United Arab Emirates Comprehensive Economic Partnership Agreement (CEPA). Marking the fastest trade agreement negotiation in Canadian history at just 47 days, the pact aims to significantly deepen economic ties and enhance bilateral trade.
Vietnam	1973-08-21	See Canada–Vietnam relations: Since 1994, Canada has an embassy in Hanoi and since 1997 a general consulate in Ho Chi Minh City.; Vietnam has an embassy in Ottawa.; Both countries are full members of the Francophonie and of the Asia-Pacific Economic Cooperation.; There are 152,000 people of people of Vietnamese descent living in Canada.; In 2024, Canada's top exports to Vietnam were wheat ($117M), soybeans ($60.9M), and frozen bovine meat ($57.8M), while Vietnam's top exports to Canada were telephones ($1.63B), computers ($1.15B), and microphones and headphones ($436M).; Canadian Ministry of Foreign Affairs and International Trade about relations with Vietnam; Vietnamese Ministry of Foreign Affairs about relations with Canada
Yemen	1975-12 (North Yemen); 1976-05 (South Yemen); 1989-09 (united Yemen)	Canada is represented in Yemen by its embassy in Riyadh, Saudi Arabia.; Yemen has an embassy in Ottawa.; Canadian Ministry of Foreign Affairs and International Trade about relations with Yemen

=== Europe ===
Country	Formal relations began	Notes
Albania	1987-09-10	See Albania–Canada relations: The Canadian embassy in Rome is accredited to Albania. Canada has an honorary consul in Tirana.; Albania is represented by their embassy in Ottawa.; Canadian Ministry of Foreign Affairs and International Trade about relations with Albania
Belarus	15 April 1992	Belarus had an embassy in Ottawa but was closed as of 1 September 2021, as a result of Canada's condemnation of the forced grounding of Ryanair Flight 4978; Canada is accredited to Belarus from its embassy in Warsaw, Poland.
Belgium	1939-01	See Belgium–Canada relations: Belgium has an embassy in Ottawa, two consulates (in Montreal and Toronto), and four honorary consuls (in Edmonton, Halifax, Vancouver and Winnipeg) located in Canada. Belgium's three regions (Wallonia, Flanders and Brussels) each have their own offices in the Montreal consulate. Wallonia also has a second office in the Toronto consulate, which also represents Flanders and Brussels.; Canada has an embassy in Brussels. Canada also has an honorary consulate in Antwerp, and Quebec maintains its own separate delegation in Brussels. The Canadian delegations to the European Union and the North Atlantic Treaty Organization are located in Belgium, as Belgium houses the headquarters of each. Luxembourg is often dealt with in tandem to Belgium.; Belgium and Canada are member states of a variety of international organizations. They include: the United Nations, NATO, La Francophonie, the Organization for Security and Co-operation in Europe, and the Organisation for Economic Co-operation and Development.
Bulgaria		See Bulgaria–Canada relations: Bulgaria has an embassy in Ottawa and a consulate-general in Toronto.; Canada has an honorary consul in Sofia, and is represented through its embassy in Bucharest (Romania) for diplomatic matters. Both countries are members of NATO.; Canadian Foreign Affairs and International Trade Office about the relations with Bulgaria
Croatia	1993-04-14	See Canada–Croatia relations: Canada has an embassy in Zagreb.; Croatia has an embassy in Ottawa, a consulate general (in Mississauga, Ontario) and an honorary consul (in Montreal).; In September 1993 Canadian peacekeepers in the Balkans encountered Croatian forces engaged in campaign against Serbs in Croatia called Operation Medak Pocket, and claim to have engaged them in a firefight. This version of events is disputed by Croatian media outlets.; See also Embassy of Croatia in Ottawa, Canadians of Croatian ancestry; Canadian Ministry of Foreign Affairs and International Trade about the relations with Croatia; Croatian Ministry of Foreign Affairs: list of bilateral treaties with Canada
Cyprus	1960-08-16	See Canada–Cyprus relations Canadian bilateral political relations with Cyprus stemmed initially from Cypriot Commonwealth membership at independence in 1960 (that had followed a guerrilla struggle with Britain). These relations quickly expanded in 1964 when Canada became a major troop contributor to UNFICYP. The participation lasted for the next 29 years, during which 50,000 Canadian soldiers served and 28 were killed. In large measure Canadian relations with Cyprus continue to revolve around support for the ongoing efforts of the UN, G8 and others to resolve the island's divided status.: Canada has an honorary consul in Nicosia.; Cyprus has a high commission in Ottawa.
Czech Republic	1993	See Canada–Czech Republic relations: Canada has an embassy in Prague.; Czech Republic has an embassy in Ottawa and consulates-general in Montreal and Toronto and honorary consuls (in Calgary, Vancouver and Winnipeg).
Denmark	1949-10-14	See Canada–Denmark relations: Canada has an embassy in Copenhagen.; Denmark has an embassy in Ottawa and a consulate general in Toronto.; Both countries are full members of NATO and of the Arctic Council.; There are more than 200,000 Canadians with Danish ancestry.; Recent issues between Canada and Denmark involve the claim of Hans Island.; Canadian Ministry of Foreign Affairs and International Trade about relations with Denmark
Estonia	1922	See Canada–Estonia relations Office of the Embassy of Canada to Estonia in Riga: Canada recognised Estonia in 1922 and re-recognised Estonia on 26 August 1991.; Canada is represented in Estonia through its embassy in Riga (Latvia) and an honorary consul in Tallinn.; Estonia has an embassy in Ottawa and four honorary consuls (in Montreal, Vancouver, and two in Toronto).; There are around 22,000 Canadians of Estonian descent.; Canadian Ministry of Foreign Affairs and International Trade about relations with Estonia; Estonian Ministry of Foreign Affairs about relations with Canada
Finland	1947-11-21	See Canada–Finland relations Office of the Embassy of Canada to Finland in Helsinki: Canada has an embassy in Helsinki.; Finland has an embassy in Ottawa and 13 honorary consuls (from west to east) in Vancouver, Calgary, Edmonton, Regina, Winnipeg, Thunder Bay, Sault Ste. Marie, Timmins, Sudbury, Toronto, Montreal, Quebec City and Halifax.; With their 13 consulates across Canada, Finland is the most represented foreign country in Canada.; Both countries are full members of NATO, the Organization for Security and Co-operation in Europe and the Arctic Council.; Canada fully supported Finland's application to join NATO, which resulted in membership on 4 April 2023.; There are around 143,645 Finnish Canadians.; Canadian Ministry of Foreign Affairs and International Trade about relations with Finland; Ministry for Foreign Affairs of Finland about relations with Canada
France	1882	See Canada–France relations Canada and the Republic of France are members of: the Canada-France Inter-Parliamentary Association, the Comprehensive Economic and Trade Agreement (CETA), the G8, the G20, NATO, the Organisation internationale de la Francophonie, and the United Nations. In the 2007 and 2008, French President Nicolas Sarkozy, Canadian Prime Minister Stephen Harper, and Quebec Premier Jean Charest all spoke in favour of a Canada – EU free trade agreement. In October 2008, Sarkozy became the first French President to address the National Assembly of Quebec. In his speech he spoke out against Quebec separatism, but recognized Quebec as a nation within Canada. He said that, to France, Canada was a friend, and Quebec was family.: Canada has an embassy in Paris.; France has an embassy in Ottawa and consulates-general in Moncton, Montreal, Quebec City, Toronto and Vancouver.; See also: Embassy of France in Ottawa, Embassy of Canada in Paris, List of French ambassadors to Canada, List of ambassadors of Canada to France
Germany		See Canada–Germany relations: Until 2005 Canada's embassy was in Bonn, but in April 2005 a new embassy opened in Berlin. Canada also operates consulates in Munich, Düsseldorf and Hamburg.; The provinces of Ontario and Alberta have representatives in Germany, co-located in the consulates. Quebec runs a stand-alone bureau in Munich, with an "antenne culturelle" office in Berlin.; In addition to its embassy in Ottawa, Germany maintains consulates in Toronto, Montreal and Vancouver. Additional diplomats responsible for specialized files are also accredited from Washington.; See also: Embassy of Canada in Berlin, Embassy of Germany in Ottawa
Greece	1937	See also Canada–Greece relations: The nations first exchanged ambassadors in 1942.; Both countries are members of the United Nations, the Human Security Network, the Organization for Security and Co-operation in Europe, and NATO.; Greece has an embassy in Ottawa, as well as consulates general in Montreal, Toronto, and Vancouver.; Canada has an embassy in Athens and an honorary consul in Thessaloniki.; See also: Embassy of Greece in Ottawa; Canadian Ministry of Foreign Affairs about relations with Greece; Greek Ministry of Foreign Affaires about relations with Canada
Holy See	1969	See Canada–Holy See relations Although the Roman Catholic Church has been territoriality established in Canada since the founding of New France in the early 17th century, Holy See–Canada relations were only officially established under the papacy of Paul VI in the 1960s.: Canada has an embassy in Rome accredited to the Holy See.; Holy See has an apostolic nunciature in Ottawa.
Hungary	1964	See Canada–Hungary relations: Canada has an embassy in Budapest.; Hungary has an embassy in Ottawa, a consulate general in Toronto and six honorary consuls (from west to east) in Vancouver (two), Calgary, Edmonton, Winnipeg and Montreal.; Both countries are full members of NATO.; Canadian Ministry of Foreign Affairs and International Trade about relations with Hungary
Iceland	1942	See Canada–Iceland relations: Iceland's first honorary consulate was established in Winnipeg, Manitoba in 1942. In May 2001, Iceland opened an embassy in Ottawa and upgrade its Winnipeg mission to an official consulate.; In November 2001, Canada opened an embassy in Reykjavík, before then it was represented by their embassy in Oslo (Norway) and an honorary consul in Reykjavík.; Both countries are full members of NATO and of the Arctic Council.; Canada Foreign Affairs and International Trade Ministry about relations with Iceland
Ireland	1929-12-28	See Canada–Ireland relations Canada and Ireland enjoy friendly relations, the importance of these relations centres on the history of Irish migration to Canada. Roughly 4 million Canadians have Irish ancestors, or approximately 14% of Canada's population.: Canada has an embassy in Dublin.; Ireland has an embassy in Ottawa and consulates-general in Toronto and Vancouver.; See also: Embassy of Ireland in Ottawa, List of ambassadors and high commissioners of Canada to Ireland
Italy	1947	See Canada–Italy relations: Canada has an embassy in Rome, and honorary consuls (in Milan and Udine).; Italy has an embassy in Ottawa, and consulates general (in Montreal, Toronto and Vancouver).; Both countries are full members of the Organisation for Economic Co-operation and Development, the G8, and NATO. There are around 1,500,000 people of Italian descent living in Canada.; Canadian Ministry of Foreign Affairs and International Trade about the relation with Italy
Kosovo	2009-04-07	See also Canada–Kosovo relations Canada recognized Kosovo on 18 March 2008.: Canada is accredited to Kosovo from its embassy in Zagreb, Croatia.; Kosovo has an embassy in Ottawa.
Latvia	1921	See Canada–Latvia relations: Canada re-recognized Latvia's independence on 26 August 1991. Restored relations on 3 September 1991.; Canada has an embassy in Riga.; Latvia has an embassy in Ottawa and honorary consuls in Quebec City and Toronto.
Lithuania	1921	See Canada–Lithuania relations: Canada has an embassy office in Vilnius, but that reports to the embassy in Riga (Latvia).; Lithuania has an embassy in Ottawa and honorary consuls in Montreal and Vancouver.; Both countries are full members of the Organization for Security and Co-operation in Europe and of NATO.; Canadian Ministry of Foreign Affairs and International Trade about relations with Lithuania; Lithuanian Ministry of Foreign Affairs: list bilateral treaties with Canada in Lithuanian only
Luxembourg		See Canada–Luxembourg relations: Canada is represented in Luxembourg through its embassy in Brussels (Belgium)and an honorary consul in Luxembourg City.; Luxembourg is represented in Canada through its embassy in Washington, D.C. (US), and honorary consuls (in Calgary, Montreal, Toronto, and Vancouver).; Canada's Luxembourg relations are conducted through Canada's embassy in Belgium.; Both countries are full members of the Organisation for Economic Co-operation and Development and of NATO.; Canadian Ministry of Foreign Affairs and Trade about the relation with Luxembourg
Malta	1964	See Canada–Malta relations: Canada is accredited to Malta from its embassy in Rome, Italy and maintains an honorary consul in Valletta.; Malta is accredited to Canada from its embassy in Washington, D.C., United States. The Ambassador of Malta to the United States also serves as High Commissioner of Malta to Canada.; Malta has a consulate general in Toronto and four honorary consuls in (from west to east) Vancouver, Edmonton, Laval and St. John's.; Canada hosts a large Maltese immigrant community.; Both countries are full members of the Commonwealth of Nations.; Canadian Ministry of Foreign Affairs and International Trade about relations with Malta
Netherlands	1939-01	See Canada–Netherlands relations: Canada has an embassy in The Hague.; The Netherlands has an embassy in Ottawa, and consulates general in Toronto, Montreal and Vancouver.
North Macedonia	1995	See Canada–North Macedonia relations: North Macedonia and Canada established diplomatic relations on 4 July 1996.; Canada is accredited to North Macedonia from its embassy in Belgrade, Serbia.; North Macedonia has an embassy in Ottawa and a consulate-general in Toronto.
Norway	1942	See Canada–Norway relations: Canada has an embassy in Oslo.; Norway has an embassy in Ottawa and consulates general in Montreal, Toronto and Vancouver.; Both countries are full members of the Arctic Council, of the Organization for Security and Co-operation in Europe, of NATO and of the Organisation for Economic Co-operation and Development.
Poland	1935	See Canada–Poland relations: The Canada-Poland diplomatic relationship goes back from the first bilateral agreement, a Convention on Merchant Shipping, which was signed in 1935.; Canada has an embassy in Warsaw.; Poland has an embassy in Ottawa and consulates general (in Montreal, Toronto and Vancouver).; There are over 800,000 Polish-Canadians living in Canada.; Both countries are full members of NATO and OECD.
Portugal	January 1952	See Canada–Portugal relations: Canada has an embassy in Lisbon.; Portugal has an embassy in Ottawa and consulates-general in Montreal, Toronto and Vancouver.
Romania	1967-04-03	See Canada–Romania relations: Canada sent its first resident ambassador in December 1976, and has an embassy in Bucharest.; Romania has an embassy in Ottawa, opened in 1967, and consulates general (in Montreal, Toronto, Vancouver).; Both countries are members of NATO.; See also: Canadians of Romanian descent, Embassy of Canada in Bucharest, Embassy of Romania in Ottawa; Canadian Foreign Affairs and International Trade Office about relations with Romania; Romanian Ministry of Foreign Affairs about relations with Canada
Russia	1942-06-12	See Canada–Russia relations Canada and Russia benefit from extensive cooperation on trade and investment, energy, democratic development and governance, security and counter-terrorism, northern issues, and cultural and academic exchanges.: Canada has an embassy in Moscow.; Russia has an embassy in Ottawa and consulates-general in Montreal and Toronto
Serbia		See Canada–Serbia relations: Canada has an embassy in Belgrade.; Serbia has an embassy in Ottawa and a consulate general in Toronto and honorary consuls (in Montreal and Vancouver).; There are around 150,000 people of Serbian descent living in Canada.; Canadian Ministry of Foreign Affairs and International Trade about relations with Serbia; Serbian Ministry of Foreign Affairs about relations with Canada
Slovakia	1993-01-01	Canada is accredited to Slovakia from its embassy in Prague, Czech Republic.; Slovakia has an embassy in Ottawa.; Both countries are full members of NATO.; There are around 100,000 people of Slovak descent living in Canada.; Canadian Ministry of Foreign affairs and Trade about the relation with Slovakia
Slovenia	1992	See Canada–Slovenia relations: Canada recognized Slovenian independence in January 1992, and established diplomatic relations a year later.; Canada is accredited to Slovenia from its embassy in Budapest, Hungary, and through an honorary consul in Ljubljana.; Slovenia has an embassy in Ottawa and a consulate-general in Toronto.; Both countries are full members of NATO.; There are more than 35,000 Slovenes who live in Canada.; Canadian Ministry of Foreign Affairs and International Trade about relations with Slovenia
Spain	1935	See Canada–Spain relations: Canada has an embassy in Madrid and consulates in Barcelona and Málaga.; Spain has an embassy in Ottawa and consulates-general in Montreal and Toronto.; Both countries are full members of NATO, the Organization for Security and Co-operation in Europe and of the Organisation for Economic Co-operation and Development.; There are 213,000 people of Spanish descent living in Canada.; In 1995, a fishing dispute between the two countries broke out after Canadian Officials boarded a Spanish vessel in international waters.; Canadian Ministry of Foreign Affairs and International Trade about relations with Spain; Spanish Ministry of Foreign Affairs and Cooperation about relations with Canada (in Spanish only)
Sweden		See Canada–Sweden relations Both countries have strong commitments to peacekeeping, UN reform, development assistance, environmental protection, sustainable development, and the promotion and protection of human rights. In additional, there are more than 300,000 Canadians of Swedish descent.: Canada has an embassy in Stockholm and honorary consulates in Gothenburg and Malmö.; Sweden has an embassy in Ottawa and ten honorary consulates in Calgary, Edmonton, Fredericton, Halifax, Montreal, Quebec City, Regina, Toronto, Vancouver and Winnipeg.; Both countries are full members of NATO, the Organization for Security and Co-operation in Europe and of the Arctic Council.; Canada fully supported Sweden's application to join NATO, which resulted in membership on 7 March 2024.
Switzerland	1945	See Canada–Switzerland relations: The first Swiss consulate opened in Montreal in 1875.; Canada has an embassy in Bern and a United Nations mission in Geneva.; Switzerland has an embassy in Ottawa, and consulates general (in Montreal, Toronto and Vancouver) and honorary consuls (in Calgary, Halifax, Quebec City and Winnipeg).; Both countries are full members of the Francophonie.; Canadian Foreign Affairs and International Trade Department about relations with Switzerland; Swiss Federal Department of Foreign Affairs about relations with Canada
Ukraine	1992	See Canada–Ukraine relations, Embassy of Ukraine in Ottawa Diplomatic relations were established between Canada and Ukraine on 27 January 1992. Canada opened its embassy in Kyiv In April 1992, and the Embassy of Ukraine in Ottawa opened in October of that same year, paid for mostly by donations from the Ukrainian-Canadian community. Ukraine opened a consulate general in Toronto in 1993 and announced plans to open another in Edmonton in 2008. The main bilateral agreement signed between the two governments is the joint declaration of the "Special Partnership" between the two countries signed in 1994 and renewed in 2001.: Canada has an embassy in Kyiv and a consulate in Lviv.; Ukraine has an embassy in Ottawa and a consulate-general in Toronto.
United Kingdom	1926	See Canada–United Kingdom relations Canadian Prime Minister Mark Carney with British Prime minister Keir Starmer in London, March 2025. Canada established diplomatic relations with the United Kingdom on 1 July 1926. Both countries are Commonwealth Realms.: Canada maintains a high commission in London.; The United Kingdom is accredited to Canada through its high commission in Ottawa, and consulate generals in Calgary, Montreal, Toronto, and Vancouver.; The UK governed Canada from 1783 to 1931, when Canada achieved full independence. Both countries share common membership of the Atlantic Co-operation Pact, Commonwealth, CPTPP, Five Eyes, the G7, the G20, the International Criminal Court, NATO, the OECD, the OSCE, UKUSA Agreement, the United Nations, and the World Trade Organization. Bilaterally the two countries have a Double Taxation Convention, and a Trade Continuity Agreement.

=== Oceania ===
Country	Formal relations began	Notes
Australia	1939-09-12	See Australia–Canada relations The Commonwealth of Australia and Canada are two of fifteen commonwealth realms, members of: the Commonwealth of Nations, the Comprehensive and Progressive Agreement for Trans-Pacific Partnership, the G20, and the United Nations.: Australia has a high commission in Ottawa and a consulate-general in Toronto and a consulate in Vancouver; Canada has a high commission in Canberra and a consulate-general in Sydney.; See also High Commission of Australia in Ottawa, High Commission of Canada in Australia, List of high commissioners of Australia to Canada, List of high commissioners of Canada to Australia
New Zealand	1942	See Canada–New Zealand relations Canada and New Zealand are two of fifteen commonwealth realms, members of: the Commonwealth of Nations, the Comprehensive and Progressive Agreement for Trans-Pacific Partnership, the G20, and the United Nations. New Zealand and Canada have a longstanding relationship that has been fostered by both countries' shared history and culture, by their membership the Commonwealth of Nations and links between residents of both countries. The two countries have a common Head of State, currently Charles III. New Zealand and Canada also have links through business or trade relations, the United Nations, the Commonwealth and mutual treaty agreements. New Zealand-Canada relations are important to both countries.: Canada has a high commission in Wellington and a consulate in Auckland.; New Zealand has a high commission in Ottawa and a trade office in Vancouver.; See also List of high commissioners of New Zealand to Canada, List of high commissioners of Canada to New Zealand
Papua New Guinea	9 August 1976	Canada is accredited to Papua New Guinea from its High Commission in Canberra, Australia.; Papua New Guinea is accredited to Canada from its embassy in Washington, D.C., United States.
Solomon Islands	7 July 1978	Canada and the Solomon Islands are two of fifteen commonwealth realms, members of: the Commonwealth of Nations and the United Nations.: Both countries established diplomatic relations on 7 July 1978.; Canada is accredited to the Solomon Islands from its high commission in Wellington, New Zealand.; Solomon Islands is accredited to Canada from its Permanent Mission to the United Nations in New York City, New York.; Both countries are full members of the Commonwealth of Nations.

== See also ==
- List of ambassadors and high commissioners to Canada
- List of state and official visits by Canada
- List of Canadian diplomats
- List of United States presidential visits to Canada
- List of international trips made by prime ministers of Canada
  - List of international prime ministerial trips made by Mark Carney
- Foreign policy of the Justin Trudeau government
- Foreign policy of the Stephen Harper government
