= Canada–Romania relations =

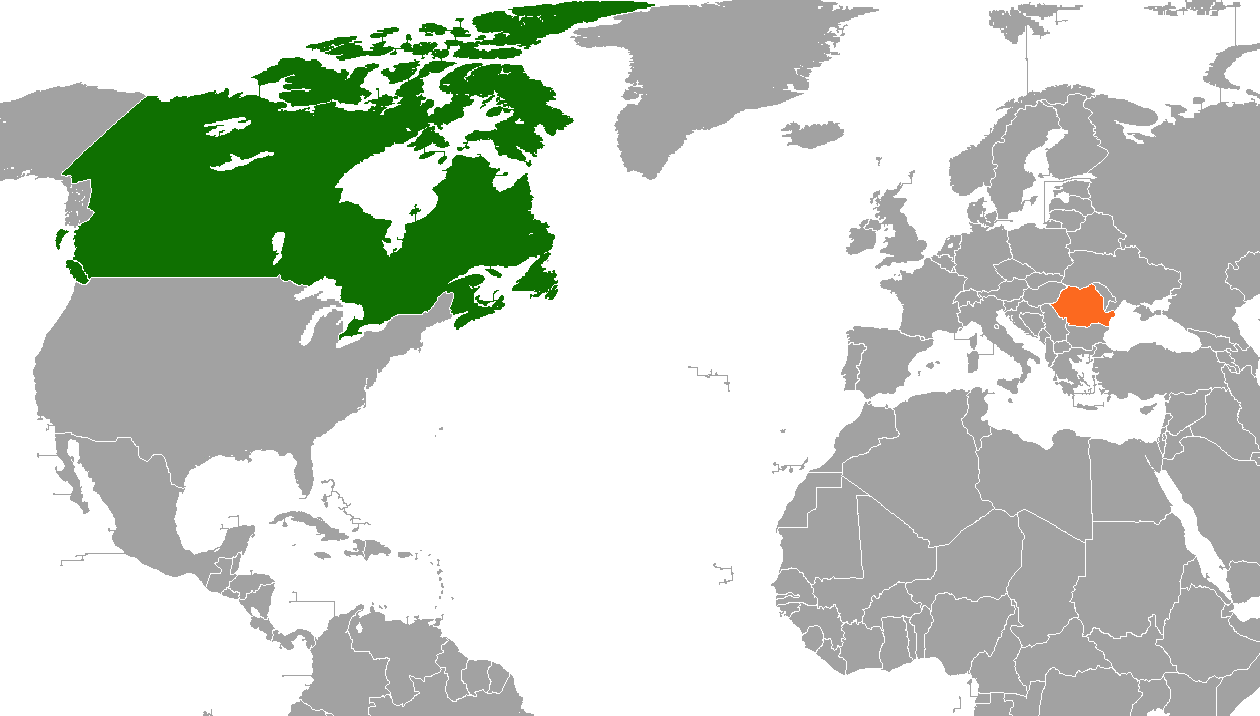

- Canada: Romania

Diplomatic mission
- Embassy of Canada in Bucharest: Embassy of Romania in Ottawa

Canada and Romania have maintained bilateral relations since 1967. The two countries are members of OSCE, La Francophonie and NATO. Canada has an embassy in Bucharest, and Romania has an embassy in Ottawa and three consulates-general (in Montreal, Toronto and Vancouver).

== History ==
Clifford Sifton visited Bukovina in 1895. From 1912 to 1913, Robert W. Service was a correspondent for the Toronto Star during the Balkan Wars.

Joseph W. Boyle served the king and queen of Romania during the World War I, helping to protect the country from the Central Powers and to operate Romania's railways. He was awarded the special title of "Saviour of Romania" for these and many other deeds. He remained a close friend, and was at one time a possible lover of the Romanian Queen, British-born Marie of Edinburgh.

The formal Canada-Romania diplomatic relationship goes back in 1919. Formal relations were established on August 16, 1919 when the General Consulate of Romania was established in Montreal by Vasile Stoica. Prior to that, the consulate had worked without the consent of Canadian authorities.

Canadian general, diplomat and peacekeeper John de Chastelain was born in Bucharest to a Scottish father and an American mother.

Bilateral relations at embassy level were initiated on April 3, 1967. Canada commissioned its first resident ambassador in Romania, Bruce MacGillivray Williams, in December 1967. The Embassy of Romania in Ottawa was opened in 1970. In 1991, the General Consulate of Romania started to operate in Toronto, while the General Consulate in Montreal regained its initial functions.

Romania's senior official in Ottawa currently is Mr. Bogdan Manoiu, Chargé d'affaires.

== Economic relations ==
Romania is Canada's largest trading partner in Southeast Europe. The flagship project for Canada is the Cernavodă Nuclear Power Plant established with Atomic Energy of Canada Limited (AECL). The first nuclear reactor has been in operation since 1996 and the official launch of the second nuclear reactor took place in 2007. AECL and its consortium partners have entered Romania's procurement process for the construction of reactors 3 and 4.

In 2012, bilateral trade between Canada and Romania reached (CAD) $387.5 million. The stock of Canadian investment in Romania was $273 million at the end of 2011. Canada has invested in mineral fuel exploration and automobile construction.

== Bilateral agreements ==
- Double Taxation Avoidance Agreement, which came into effect December 31, 2004.
- Social Security Agreement was signed on November 19, 2009.
- Other treaties cover: Extradition, Foreign Investment Protection, Fisheries, Legal Assistance in Criminal Matters, Nuclear Cooperation and Trade.

== Resident diplomatic missions ==
- Canada has an embassy in Bucharest.
- Romania has an embassy in Ottawa and consulates-general in Montreal, Toronto and Vancouver.

== Gallery ==
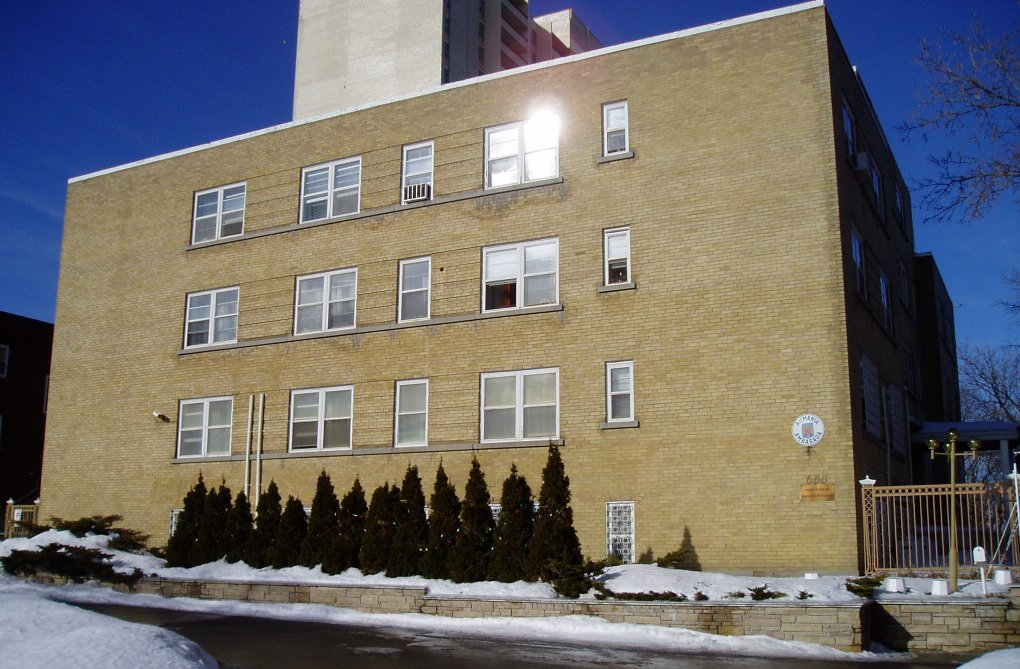
Embassy of Romania in Ottawa

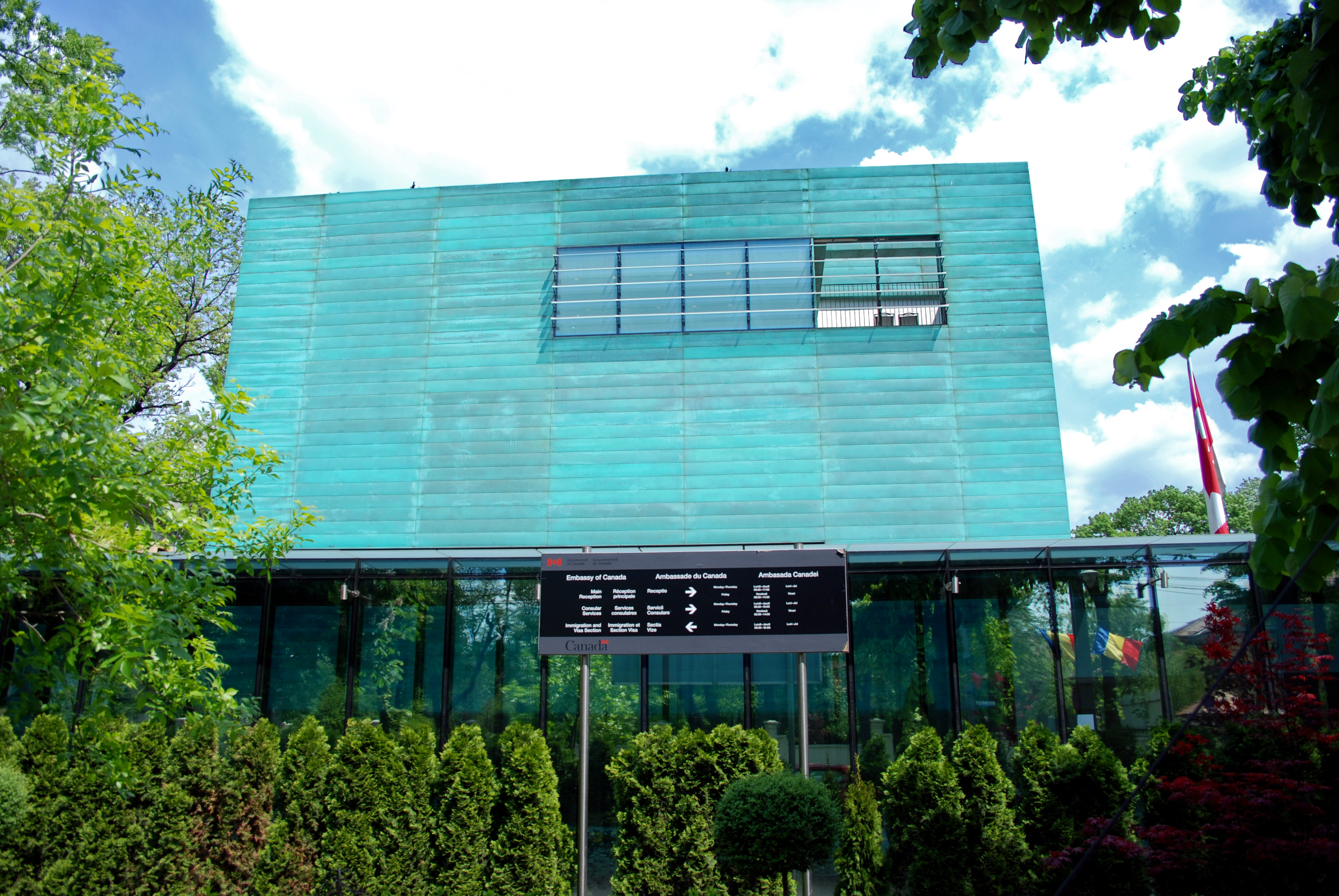
Embassy of Canada in Bucharest

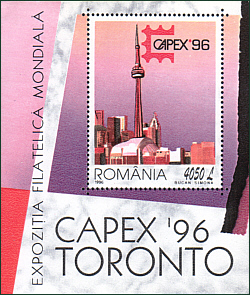
CN Tower

== See also ==
- Foreign relations of Canada
- Foreign relations of Romania
- Canada-EU relations
- NATO-EU relations
