= Canada–Guatemala relations =

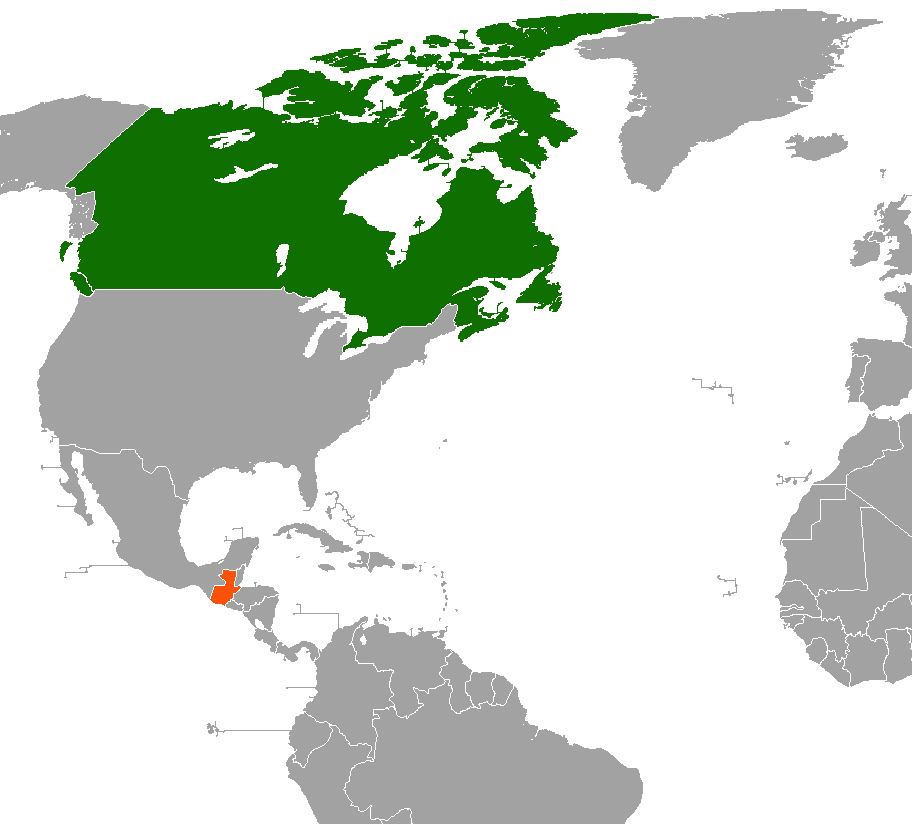

- Canada: Guatemala

Canada–Guatemala relations refers to the bilateral relations between Canada and the Republic of Guatemala.

The two nations established diplomatic relations in 1961. Both nations are members of the Organization of American States and the United Nations.

== History ==
Diplomatic relations between Canada and Guatemala were established on 16 September 1961. In November of that same year, Canada opened a resident embassy in Guatemala City. In 1976, both nations signed a general Agreement on Technical Cooperation.

During the Guatemalan Civil War, Canada accepted over two thousand Guatemalan refugees. In August 1990, both nations signed a Memorandum of Understanding regarding the Canadian Cooperation Office project, and office which coordinates the implementation of all cooperation programs funded by the Canadian International Development Agency. The office was opened in 2001 in Guatemala City.

In May 1996, Guatemalan President Álvaro Arzú paid a visit to Canada along with other Central American Presidents and met with Prime Minister Jean Chrétien. In April 2001, Guatemalan President Alfonso Portillo traveled to Canada to attend the Summit of the Americas in Quebec City. In December 2009, Canadian Governor General Michaëlle Jean paid a visit to Guatemala and met with President Álvaro Colom. In December 2012, Governor General David Johnston also paid a visit to Guatemala and met with President Otto Pérez Molina.

In February 2024, the Canadian Government, in-line with the European Union and the United States, imposed sanctions on four individuals associated with the administration of Guatemalan President Alejandro Giammattei for their engagement in activities that directly or indirectly promoted corruption and for committing gross human rights violations with impunity. That same year in December, both nations celebrated 64 years of diplomatic relations.

== High-level visits ==
High-level visits from Canada to Guatemala

- Foreign Minister Bill Graham (2004)
- Governor General Michaëlle Jean (2009)
- Minister of State of Foreign Affairs Diane Ablonczy (2012)
- Governor General David Johnston (2012)
- Foreign Minister Stéphane Dion (2016)

High-level visits from Guatemala to Canada

- President Álvaro Arzú (1996)
- President Alfonso Portillo (2001)
- President Bernardo Arévalo (2025)

== Transportation ==
There are seasonal direct flights between both nations with Air Canada.

== Trade ==
In 2023, trade between Canada and Guatemala totaled US$956 million. Canada’s main exports to Guatemala include: cereals, paper, fats and oils, pharmaceutical products, fertilizers, and plastics. Guatemala's main exports to Canada include: fruits, coffee, vegetables, knitted apparel, and sugar. Canadian mining companies have invested in Guatemala.

== Resident diplomatic missions ==
of Canada in Guatemala

- Guatemala City (Embassy)

of Guatemala in Canada

- Ottawa (Embassy)
- Montreal (Consulate-General)
- Toronto (Consulate-General)
- Vancouver (Consulate-General)

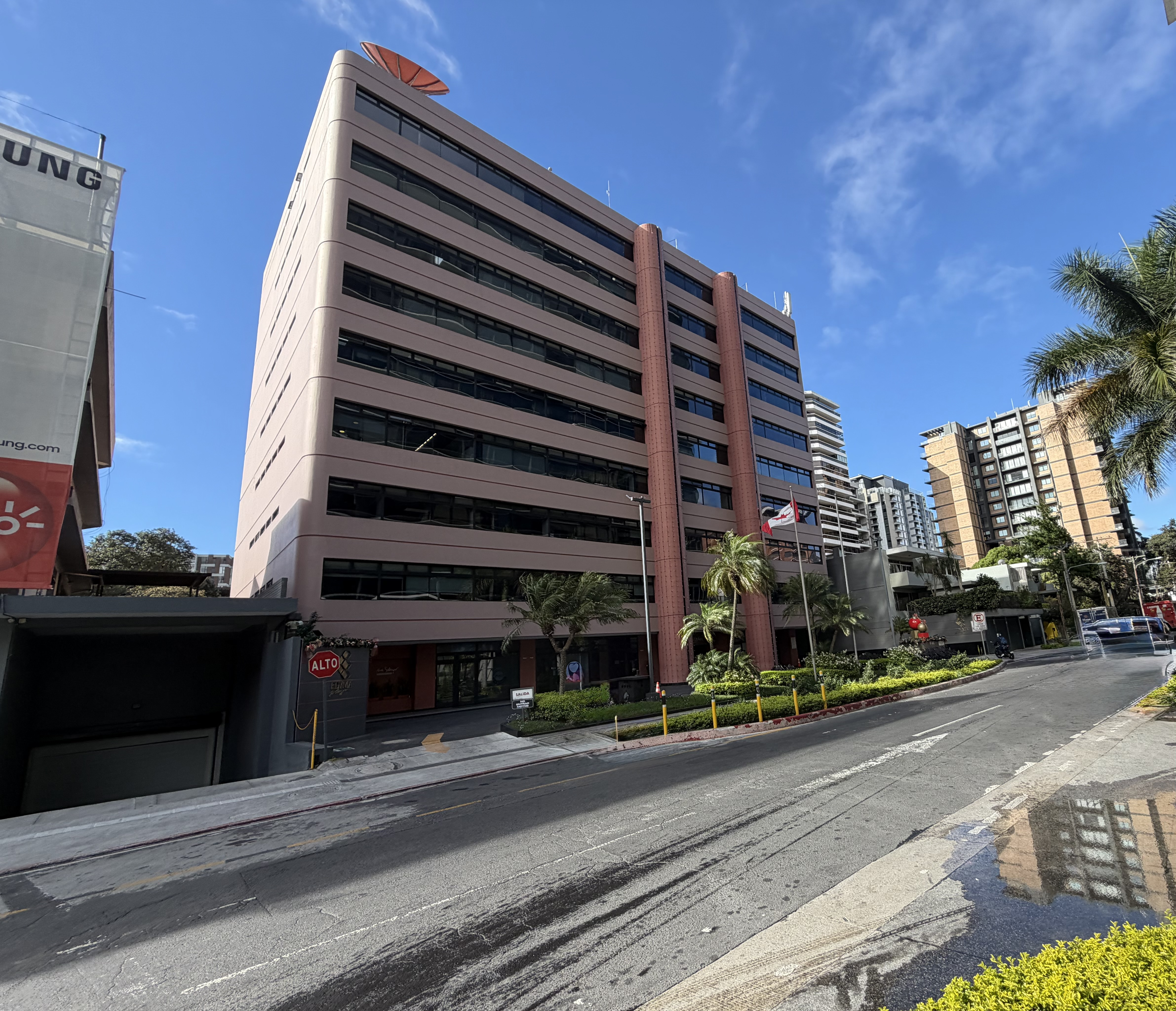
Building hosting the Embassy of Canada in Guatemala City

== See also ==
- Foreign relations of Canada
- Foreign relations of Guatemala
- Latin American Canadians
