= Canada–Qatar relations =

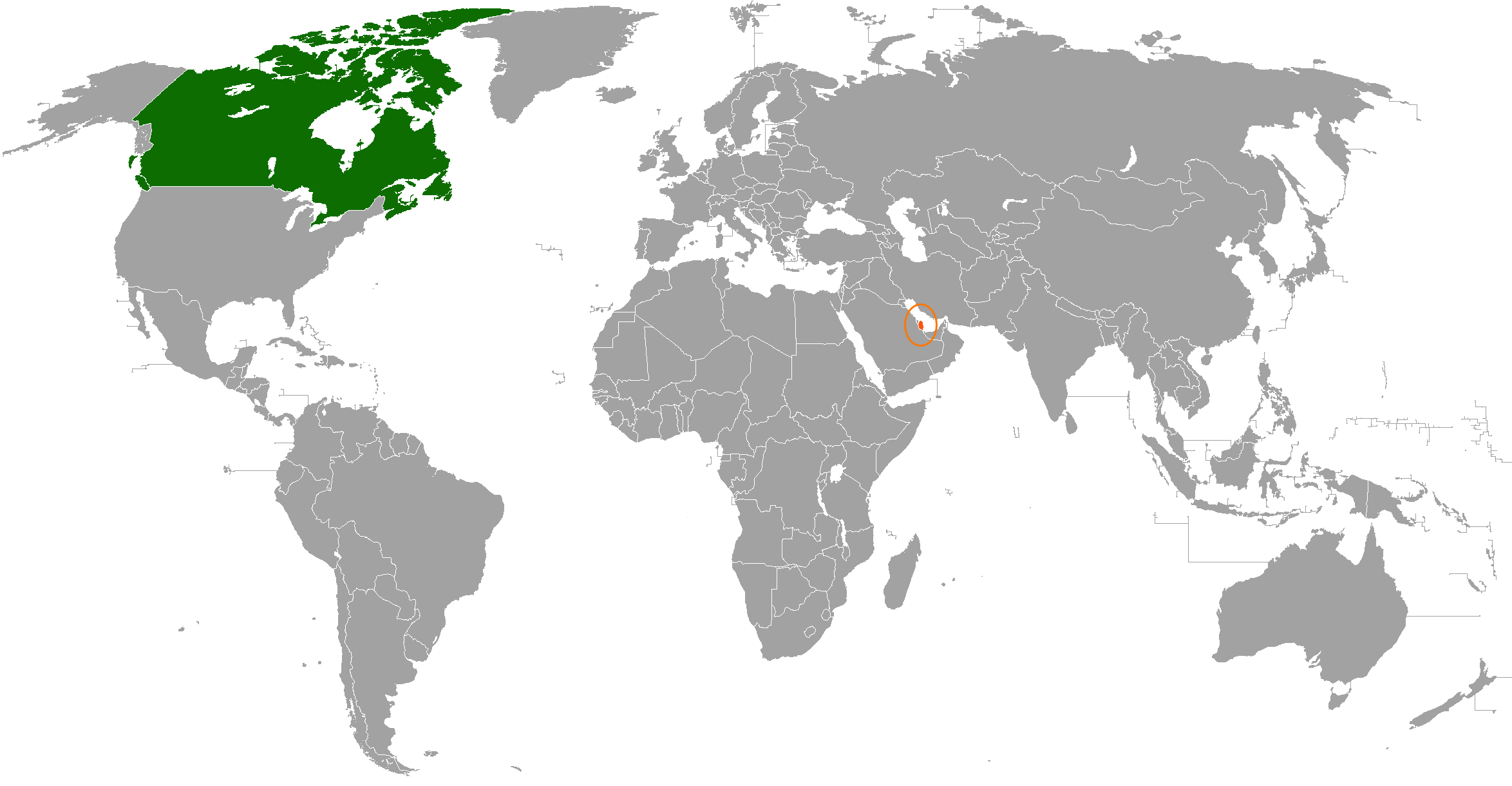

- Canada: Qatar

Canada and Qatar enjoyed friendly relations and coordination on the international field, long before Qatar's Embassy opened in Ottawa in 2011, including their joint military collaboration during the Gulf War and in the international intervention in Libya. Diplomatic relations between the two nations were established in 1974.

== Diplomatic visits ==
The Governor General of Canada, David Johnston and his wife visited Doha in 2011, and a parliamentary delegation led by the Speaker of the Senate, Noël Kinsella visited Qatar in the same year. In 2012, the Minister of Foreign Affairs, John Baird opened Canada's Embassy in Doha and conducted another official visit in 2013.

== Diplomatic relations ==
Canada and Qatar were involved in a dispute over Qatar's bid to relocate the International Civil Aviation Organization from Montreal to Doha in 2013. In May of that year, Qatar withdrew its bid, stating that it did so to "preserve the close and historic friendship" between the two countries.

In August 2018, Canada was embroiled in a spat with Saudi Arabia over a tweet by Canadian Foreign Minister Chrystia Freeland who advocated for the release of detained human rights activists in Saudi Arabia, particularly Samar Badawi and Raif Badawi. In response, Saudi Arabia imposed punitive measures on Canada which involved freezing trade and investment relations and recalling its ambassador while concurrently expelling the Canadian ambassador in Riyadh. The secretary general of the Gulf Cooperation Council (GCC) Abdullatif bin Rashid Al Zayani announced his support for Saudi Arabia's actions, as did GCC member states Bahrain and the United Arab Emirates. However, Qatar, which is also a GCC member, distanced itself from the remarks made by Al Zayani and stated that his comments "do not reflect its opinion" while mentioning that it maintains cordial relations with Canada.

== Economic relations ==
Qatar Airways operates 3 flights weekly to Montreal and 3 weekly flights to Toronto from Doha.

Prominent Canadian companies such as Bombardier Inc., Forrec, and AtkinsRéalis have participated in Qatar's growth and wide-scale projects.

== Military relations ==
During the 1991 Gulf War, Qatar allowed coalition troops from Canada to use the country as an airbase to launch aircraft on CAP duty. Roughly 500 Canadians were stationed in and conducted operations from Canada Dry bases in Qatar.

== Educational and medical relations ==
Two prestigious Canadian universities currently have a presence in Qatar. The first, the College of the North Atlantic in Qatar, is the single biggest foreign-based Canadian university. University of Calgary in Qatar is the second Canadian university, and comprises the first-ever nursing school to be established in the state of Qatar.

Furthermore, a Memorandum of Understanding (MOU) between Qatar University (QU) and Dalhousie University has formalized collaboration in the field of ocean sciences and cooperation in the development of research and training opportunities.

Toronto's Hospital for Sick Children have a five-year partnership with Hamad Medical Corporation to provide advisory services for the development and operation of the new 217-bed, 45,000 square foot children's hospital located in Hamad Medical City, a large, not-for-profit health-care complex in the heart of Doha, Qatar's capital city.

== Migration ==
As of 2024, there were over 9,000 Canadian expatriates living in Qatar.

== Resident diplomatic missions ==
- Canada has an embassy in Doha.
- Qatar has an embassy in Ottawa.

== See also ==
- Foreign relations of Canada
- Foreign relations of Qatar
