= List of ambassadors of Canada to Angola =

Ambassador of Canada to Angola
- Incumbent; Christina Buchan since November 11, 2020
- Seat: Consulate of Canada, Luanda
- Nominator: Prime Minister of Canada
- Appointer: Governor General of Canada
- Term length: At His Majesty's pleasure
- Inaugural holder: Clayton George Bullis
- Formation: May 1, 1980

The Canadian ambassador to Angola is the official representative of the Canadian government to the government of Angola. The official title for the ambassador is Ambassador Extraordinary and Plenipotentiary of Canada to the Republic of Angola. The current Canadian ambassador is Christina Buchan who was appointed on the advice of Prime Minister Justin Trudeau on November 11, 2020.

The Consulate of Canada is located at Rua Rei Katyavala 113, Luanda, Angola.

== History of diplomatic relations ==
Diplomatic relations between Canada and Angola was established on February 3, 1978. Clayton George Bullis was appointed as Canada's first Ambassador to Angola on May 1, 1980.

== List of ambassadors ==
No.	Name	Term of office			Career	Prime Minister nominated by	Ref.
No.	Name	Start Date	PoC.	End Date	Career	Prime Minister nominated by	Ref.
1	Clayton George Bullis	May 1, 1980	September 28, 1980		Career	Pierre Elliott Trudeau (1980-1984)	
2	Robert Wallace McLaren	November 25, 1982			Career	Pierre Elliott Trudeau (1980-1984)	(Note: McLaren's appointment marked the change in residency from Nigeria to Zimbabwe. The High Commissioner to Zimbabwe was concurrently accredited as Ambassador to Angola, resident in Harare, Zimbabwe.)
3	Roger Anthony Bull	April 5, 1984	May 4, 1985	October 14, 1989	Career	Pierre Elliott Trudeau (1980-1984)	
4	Charles Philip Bassett	March 8, 1990			Career	Brian Mulroney (1984-1993)	
5	Arthur Robert Wright	November 25, 1994			Career	Jean Chrétien (1993-2003)	
6	Margaret Anne Charles	September 11, 1996	November 1, 1996	August 16, 1999	Career	Jean Chrétien (1993-2003)	
7	James Wall	August 11, 1999	November 29, 1999		Career	Jean Chrétien (1993-2003)	
8	John Schram	October 31, 2002	March 3, 2003		Career	Jean Chrétien (1993-2003)	
9	Roxanne Dubé	August 19, 2005	October 28, 2005	July 2008	Career	Paul Martin (2003-2006)	
10	Barbara Richardson	September 2, 2008	February 20, 2009	June 23, 2011	Career	Stephen Harper (2006-2015)	
11	Lisa Stadelbauer	October 4, 2011	February 24, 2012		Career	Stephen Harper (2006-2015)	
12	Kumar Gupta	April 22, 2016	November 29, 2016	July 2017	Career	Justin Trudeau (2015-Present)	
13	René Cremonese	January 31, 2018	February 16, 2018	November 2020	Career	Justin Trudeau (2015-Present)	
14	Christina Buchan	November 11, 2020	August 13, 2021		Career	Justin Trudeau (2015-Present)	
