= Canada in the Second Boer War =

The request by the British for Canadian assistance during the Second Boer War was met with division. English Canadians (including Irish Canadians) were pro-war while French Canadians were anti-war. Pro-war Canadians were pro-Empire and claimed that the war "pitted British Freedom, justice and civilization against Boer backwardness" while anti-war Canadians claimed that the war amounted to "a British colonial venture". The debate over involvement in the war caused a split in the Liberal Party's voter base.

== Deployment to South Africa ==
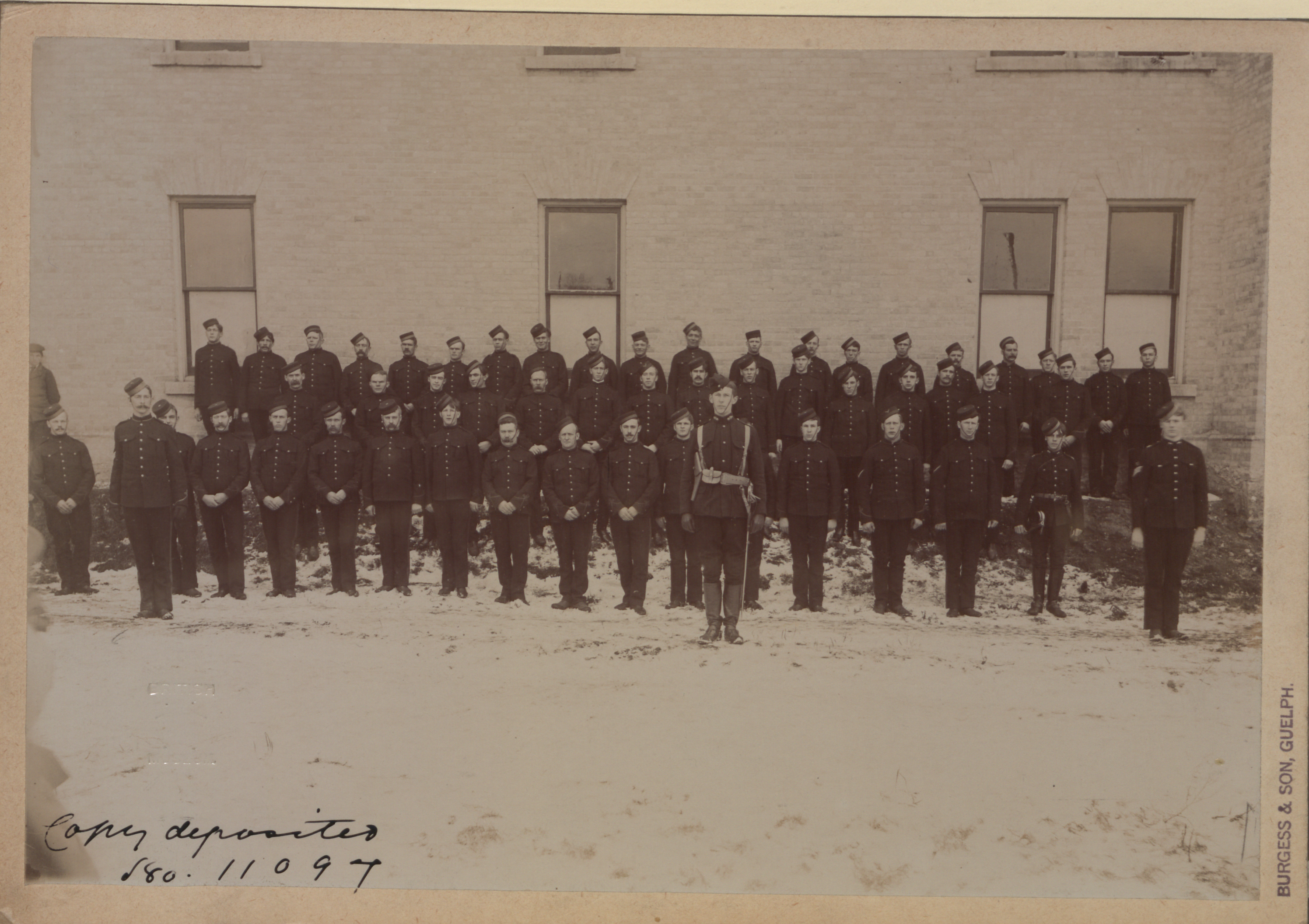
Canadian volunteers from Guelph prior to being deployed to South Africa, 1900

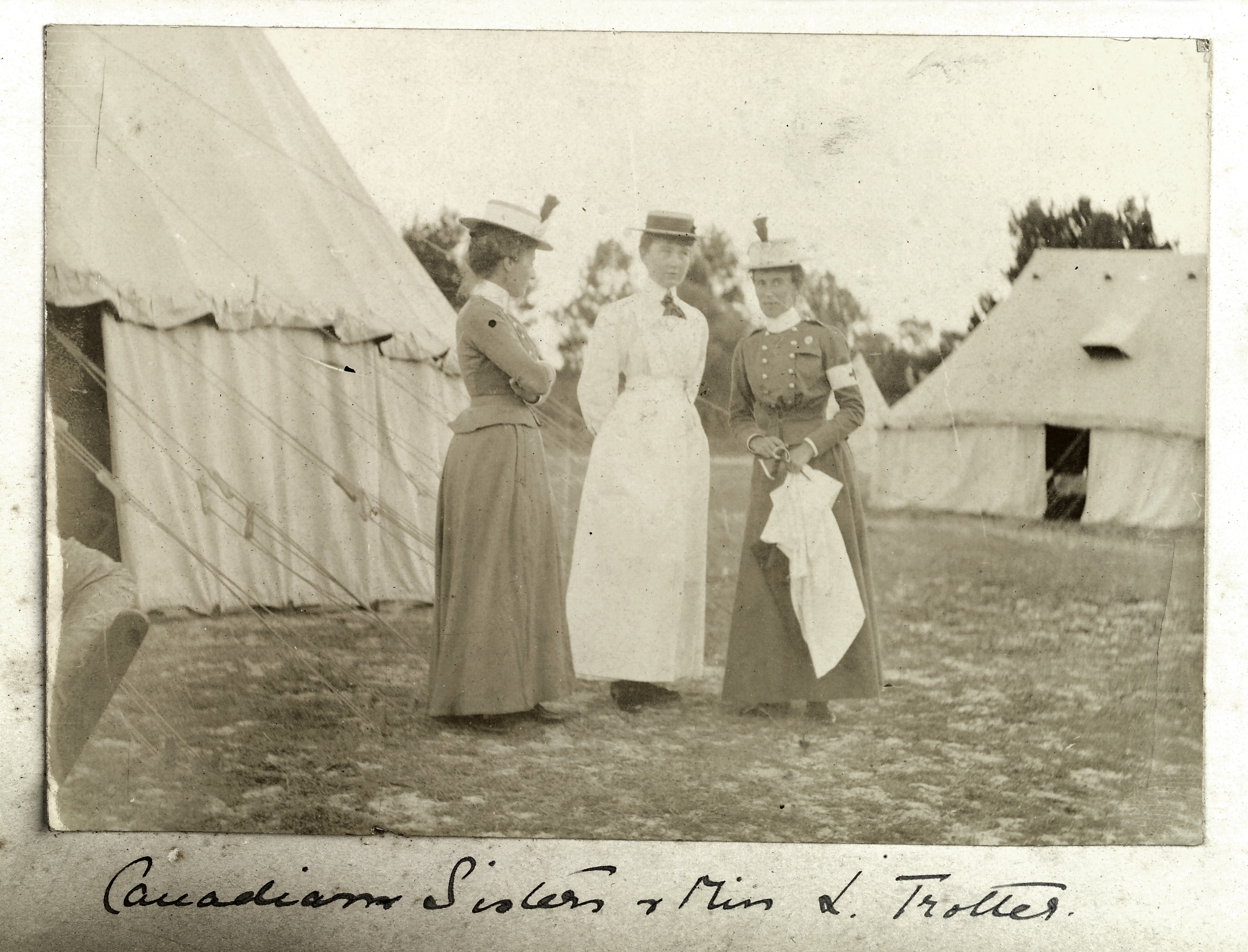
Two Canadian nurses standing with Lilias Trotter in South Africa, 1900

In order to appease both pro-war and anti-war Canadians, and under pressure from his pro-war cabinet, Prime Minister Sir Wilfrid Laurier sent a force of 1,000 soldiers from the Royal Canadian Regiment of Infantry to South Africa, all of whom were volunteers. This would also be the first time that Canadians had been sent overseas since the Mahdist War. The first contingent was under the command of Lieutenant Colonel Sir William Dillon Otter, a veteran of the Fenian raids and the North-West Rebellion. Later, two additional contingents were sent. The second contingent consisted of 6,000 men from the Royal Canadian Dragoons and units of the Canadian Mounted Rifles. The third contingent consisted of the Lord Strathcona's Horse (Royal Canadians) Regiment. Around 8,600 Canadians volunteered to fight in South Africa. In total, roughly 7,400 soldiers and 12 nurses served in South Africa during the Second Boer War. 270 Canadian soldiers would be killed during the Second Boer War and 252 were wounded.

== Equipment ==
=== Weapons ===
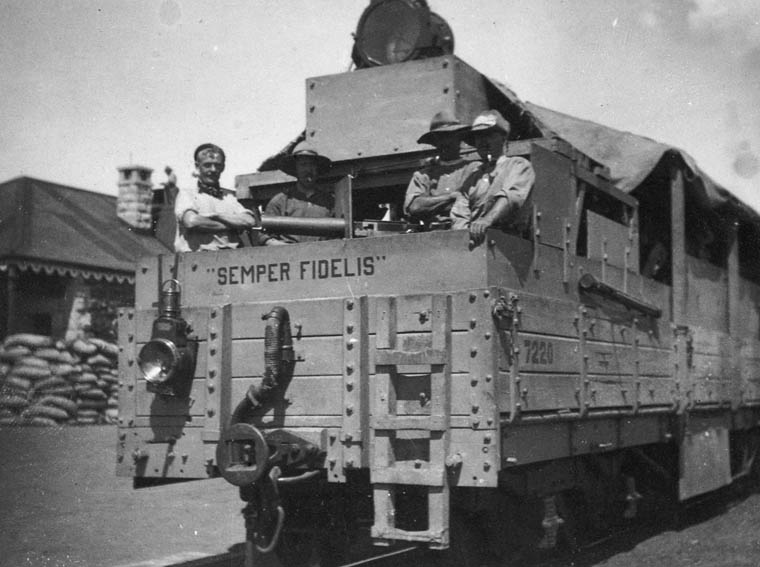
Canadian soldiers on armoured train "Semper Fidelis", January 1902

Canadian soldiers were equipped with Lee Enfield rifles. Officers were equipped with the Colt New Service revolver.

For machine guns, every Canadian unit was initially equipped with two Maxim guns which were mounted on the Dundonald Galloping Carriage. Opinions on the Maxim gun's performance during the war were mixed. Common complaints about the Maxim gun included its weight, tendency to jam, and the water cooling system needing to be continuously filled with water. Later, Canadian units were equipped with the lighter and air cooled M1895 Colt–Browning machine gun which proved to be especially popular with Canadian mounted units despite its lower rate of fire.

=== Uniform ===
The Canadian military dress in the Second Boer War was a khaki-coloured uniform. The first uniforms were manufactured in a matter of weeks by the W.E. Sandford Manufacturing Company in Hamilton, Ontario. One key difference between Canadian and British uniforms during the Second Boer War was the webbing. Canadian soldiers used the Oliver Pattern Equipment webbing while British soldiers used the British Mark IV pattern webbing. There were two versions of the Oliver Pattern Equipment webbing, a version for infantry and a version for mounted troops. The infantry version consisted of a waistbelt with a brass snake buckle, an eighty-round cartridge pouch, a bayonet frog, a pint water bottle and carrier, a canvas valise knapsack, mess tins, a canvas cover, and a set of braces with shoulder yoke. The version for mounted troops consisted of a belt, a bayonet, a haversack, a holster and a leather ammunition bandolier. Canadian mounted units also wore a type of boot which would come to be known as the Strathcona Boot which was named after the Lord Strathcona's Horse regiment. For headwear, mounted troops wore a Stetson hat while regular infantry wore a Pith helmet. The Stetson hat would go on to become an icon of the Second Boer War and a symbol of Canadian military presence in South Africa.

== Units ==
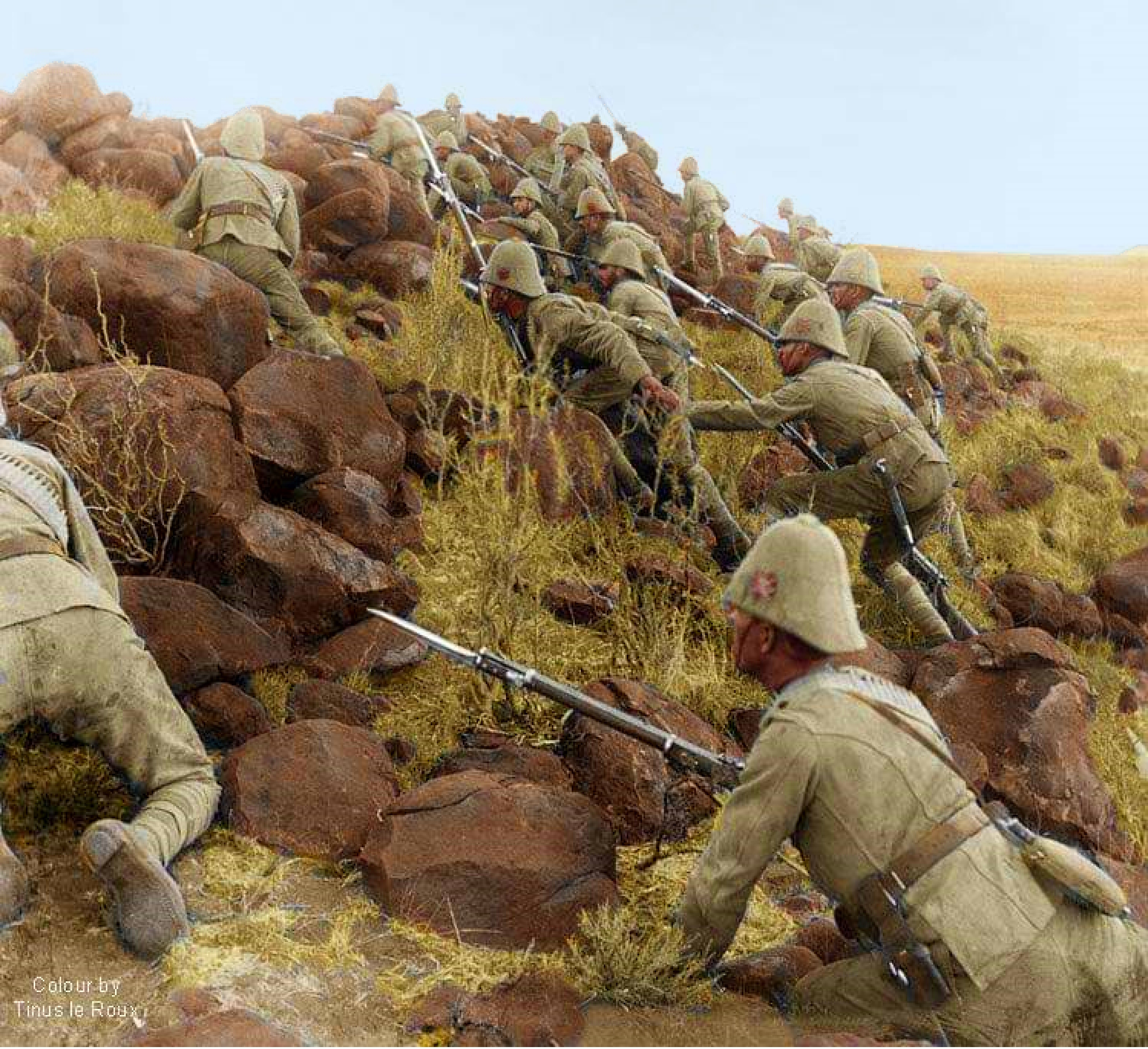
Soldiers of the 2nd Battalion, Royal Canadian Regiment of Infantry prior to an assault on the Boer fortifications during the Battle of Paardeberg, 21 February 1900

- Royal Canadian Regiment of Infantry
- Royal Canadian Dragoons
- Lord Strathcona's Horse (Royal Canadians)
- Canadian Scouts
- 1st Canadian Mounted Rifles
- 2nd Battalion, Canadian Mounted Rifles
- 3rd Battalion, Canadian Mounted Rifles
- 4th Battalion, Canadian Mounted Rifles
- 5th Battalion, Canadian Mounted Rifles
- 6th Regiment, Canadian Mounted Rifles
- 10th Canadian Field Hospital

== List of engagements involving Canadian forces ==
Battle or siege	Date	Canadian soldiers present	Estimated number killed	Estimated number wounded	Opposing force	References
Bloody Sunday (part of the Battle of Paardeberg)	February 18, 1900	897 men (Note: 31 officers and 866 other ranks)	18 killed	60 wounded	South African Republic; Orange Free State	
Battle of Paardeberg	February 18 to 27, 1900	897 men (Note: 31 officers and 866 other ranks)	31 killed	92 wounded	South African Republic; Orange Free State	
Battle of Israel's Poort	April 25, 1900	611 men (Note: 27 officers and 584 soldiers)	1 killed (Note: Not counting those who had died from disease)	3 wounded (Note: Not counting those who had fallen ill)	Orange Free State	
Battle of Zand River	May 10, 1900	70 to 80 men at the battle's start (Note: The initial Canadian force was reinforced by other companies as the battle continued)	2 killed	2 wounded	South African Republic; Orange Free State	
Relief of Mafeking	May 15 to 17, 1900	Unknown number of men	Unknown	Unknown	South African Republic; Orange Free State	
Battle of Doornkop	May 28 to 30, 1900	Unknown number of men	None reported killed	7 wounded	South African Republic; Orange Free State	
Battle of Faber's Put	May 29 to 30, 1900	Unknown number of men	1 killed	7 wounded	South African Republic	
Battle of Diamond Hill	June 11 to 12, 1900	Unknown	3 killed	15 wounded	South African Republic; Orange Free State	
Battle of Honing Spruit	June 22, 1900	8 men at the battle's start (Note: The Battle of Honing Spruit commenced when patrol of 8 Canadian Mounted Rifles were captured after they were ambushed by over 100 Boers. The ambush alerted the Canadian camp. The 4 men inside the camp held off a Boer force of 50 to 60 men until a relief force arrived 8 hours later.)	2 killed	2 wounded	South African Republic	
Battle of Witpoort	July 16, 1900	Unknown	2 killed (Note: Lieutenant Harold Lothrop Borden and Lieutenant John Edgar Burch)	Unknown	South African Republic	
Battle of Elands River (1900)	August 4 to 16, 1900	3 men	0 killed	0 wounded	South African Republic	
Battle of Leliefontein	November 7, 1900	90 to 100 men	3 killed	11 wounded	South African Republic	
Battle of Hart's River	March 31, 1902	Unknown number of men	13 killed	40 wounded	South African Republic	

== Legacy ==
The Second Boer War was the first time that Canadians had been sent overseas since the Mahdist War. It was also the largest deployment of Canadian soldiers prior to World War I. When the war had ended, a wave of celebrations swept the across the country from coast to coast. Many towns erected their first war memorials, which still stand today.
