= Embassy of Canada, Bucharest =

Diplomatic mission of Canada to Romania

Embassy of Canada to Romania
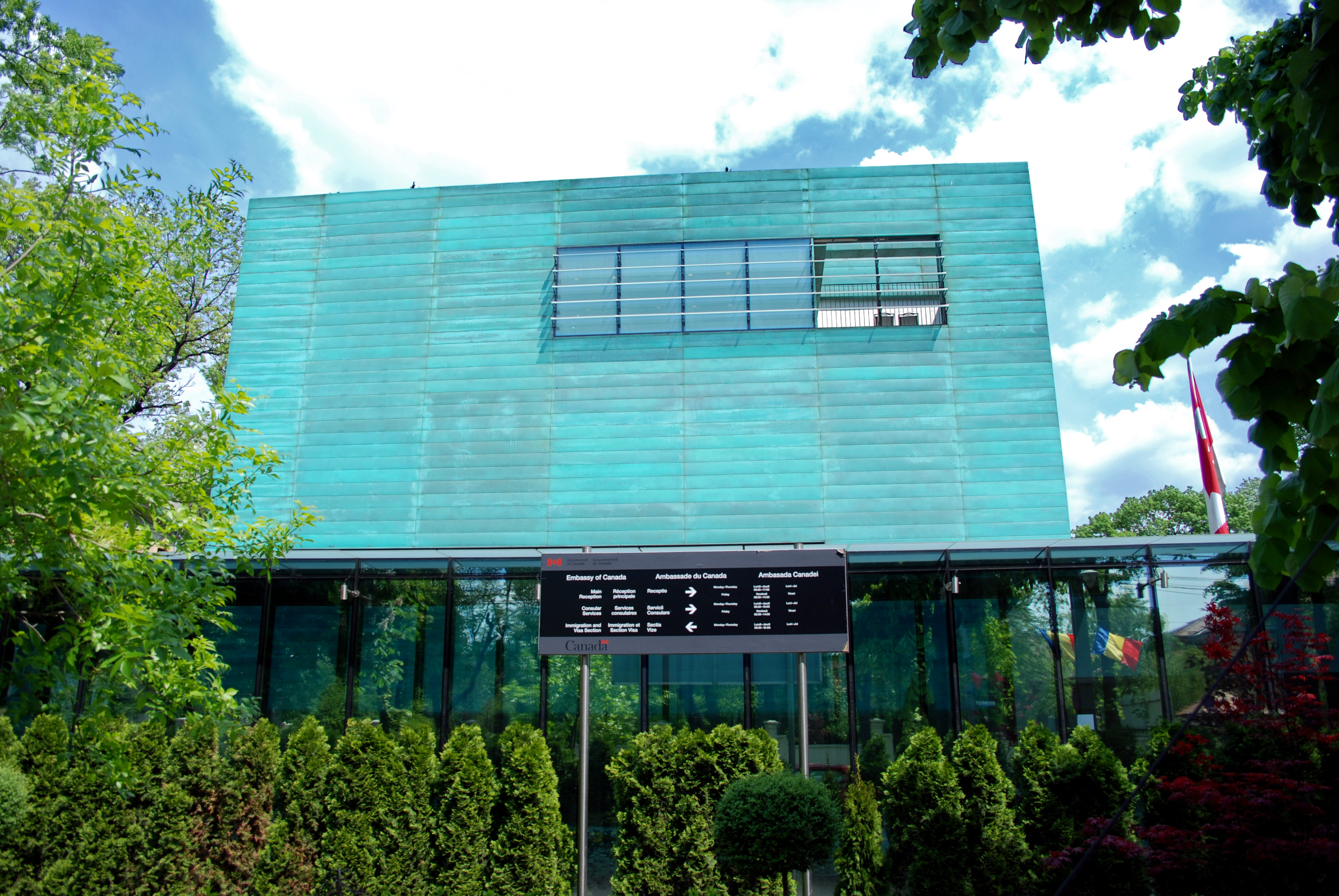
- The chancery of the embassy, opened in 2006
- Location: Bucharest, Romania
- Address: 1-3, Tuberozelor Street, Sector 1
- Coordinates: 44.46098°N 26.081838°E
- Ambassador: Gavin Buchan
- Website: Official website

The Embassy of Canada to Romania in Bucharest is the diplomatic mission of Canada to Romania. The embassy provides consular services to Canadian citizens residing or travelling in Romania, Bulgaria, and Moldova.

== History ==
Canada appointed its first resident ambassador to Romania in 1967.

A new four-storey chancery building was inaugurated in December 2006 and is located at 1-3, Tuberozelor Street in Bucharest. Its striking architecture includes pre-oxidized copper panels on two building faces.

On June 15, 2009, Lawrence Cannon, Canadian Minister of Foreign Affairs, announced the appointment of Philippe Beaulne as Ambassador to Romania, with concurrent accreditation to the Republic of Bulgaria, and High Commissioner to the Republic of Cyprus.

Joanne Lemay became the Ambassador to Romania in August 2013. She was succeeded by Kevin Hamilton, who was appointed as Ambassador in June 2016, with concurrent accreditation to the Republic of Bulgaria and the Republic of Moldova.

In September 2023, Gavin Buchan replaced Annick Goulet as Ambassador to Romania, with concurrent accreditation to Bulgaria and the Republic of Moldova.

== Ambassadors ==
Ambassador	Title	Career	Appointment date	Presentation of credentials	Termination of mission
Bruce MacGillivray Williams	AE&P	C	July 26, 1967	January 19, 1968	September 9, 1972
Robert Louis Rogers	AE&P	C	April 22, 1972	September 1972	July 27, 1974
Robert Parke Cameron	AE&P	C	June 10, 1974		December 11, 1976
J.E. Thibault	AE&P	C	July 27, 1976	December 11, 1976	June 29, 1979
Peter McLaren Roberts	AE&P	C	July 12, 1979	October 9, 1979	August 15, 1983
Jacques T. Simard	AE&P	C	October 13, 1983	September 20, 1983	
Saul Grey	AE&P	C	July 30, 1987	September 29, 1987	
William M.M. Fairweather	AE&P	C	1991	October 7, 1991	
Gilles Horace J. Duguay	AE&P	C	July 4, 1995		August 28, 1998
David Collins	AE&P	C	July 15, 1998	September 10, 1998	August 10, 2000
Raphaël Girard	AE&P	C	June 26, 2000		August 1, 2003
Franco D. Pillarella	AE&P	C	July 31, 2003	October 3, 2003	2006
Marta Moszczenska	AE&P	C	June 14, 2006	August 30, 2006	2009
Philippe Beaulne	AE&P	C	June 15, 2009	September 2, 2009	August 16, 2013
Joanne Lemay	AE&P	C	August 16, 2013		July 2016
Kevin Hamilton	AE&P	C	June 8, 2016	September 7, 2016	August 14, 2020
Annick Goulet	AE&P	C	September 29, 2020	December 15, 2020	June 16, 2023
Gavin Buchan	AE&P	C	August 8, 2023	September 14, 2023	

== Canada-Romania relations ==
Bilateral relations at embassy level were initiated on April 3, 1967.

Romania’s Embassy in Ottawa was opened in 1970. Romania has three consulates general, in Montreal, Toronto, Vancouver, and an honorary consulate in Moncton. Both countries are members of NATO.

Romania's senior official in Ottawa currently is Bogdan Manoiu, Chargé d'affaires.

== See also ==
- Canadians of Romanian descent
