= Canada–Europe relations =

- Canada: Europe

Canada

Europe

Canada has many diplomatic, economic, and cultural ties to the peoples and states of the European continent.

Prior the Second World War, this referred primarily to bilateral relations with particular countries. However, since 1945 Europe has become increasingly institutionalized, and the Government of Canada deals directly with the major European multilateral organizations.

== History ==
Canada's relationship with Europe is a consequence of the historical connections generated by colonialism and mass European immigration to Canada. Canada was first colonized by Vikings on the shores of Baffin Island, plus those of Newfoundland and Labrador in the Middle Ages. However, centuries later in the Modern Age, it would be mainly colonized by France and, after 1763, it formally joined the British Empire after its conquest in the Seven Years' War. It also had colonial influence from Spain in British Columbia, plus southern Alberta and Saskatchewan. Formal diplomatic ties were not possible between Canada and European countries when Canada was a collection of British colonies, but migration ties continued through the nineteenth and early twentieth centuries.

Traditionally, from the beginnings of Canadian diplomacy in the 1870s to the 1930s, Canadian contacts with European countries were limited. Canada was not fully independent of the British Empire in matters of foreign affairs. Therefore, Canada could not send ambassadors to European capitals but rather relied on the Canadian High Commissioner in London or the Canadian Legate attached to the British Embassies in Paris, as well as Washington to make contacts with European diplomats.

Travel between Canada and Europe for political leaders was also limited. This began to change during and following the First World War, when Canada was a member of the Entente Powers in alliance with a variety of European states including France, Belgium, Italy, and Russia, and sent troops to France and Belgium. Formal expression of this new relationship emerged after 1919 when Prime Minister Robert Borden attended the Paris Peace Conference, and when Canada joined the League of Nations and sent representatives to its headquarters in Geneva.

Canadian engagement with the League of Nations was relatively weak however, as the government of Mackenzie King mostly pursued a policy of isolationism, though King did begin to make overseas travel for prime ministers a more regular occurrence, including a visit to Adolf Hitler in Berlin in 1937.

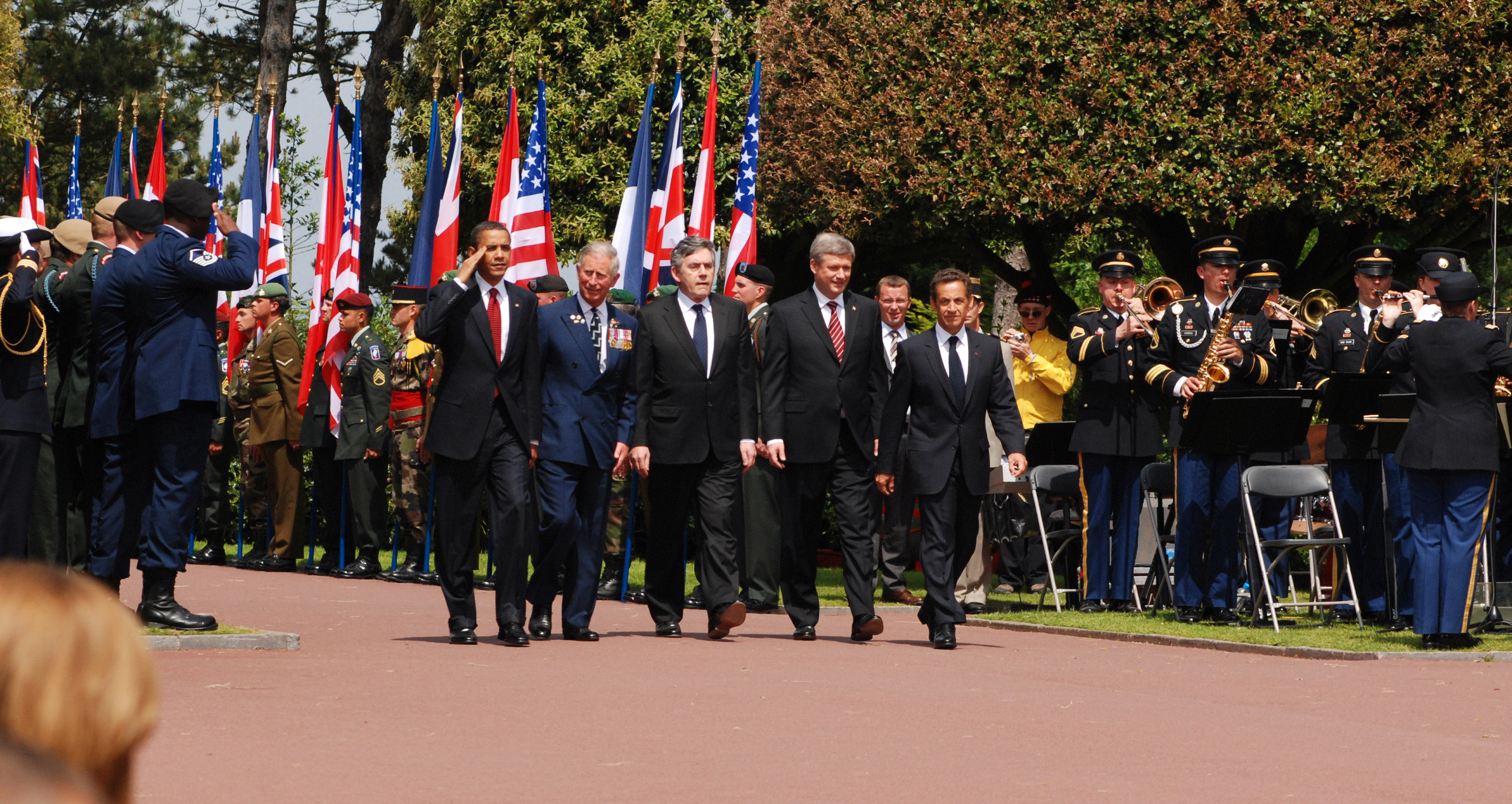
President Obama, Prince Charles, PM Brown, PM Stephen Harper and President Sarkozy at 65th anniversary commemoration of Normandy landing D-Day

With the onset of the Second World War Canada became intimately involved in the politics of Europe, as a member of the Allies, as a sanctuary for European refugees including the Dutch royal family, and with Canadian troops fighting in France, Belgium, Italy, and the Netherlands. Canada began raising the status of its missions in Europe from legations to embassies in 1944. Canada was a strongly Atlanticist state, and following the war, the new links were institutionalized through the creation of the North Atlantic Treaty Organization (NATO) which bound Canada to defend any of the (Western) European members of the alliance if it was attacked by the Soviet Union. Relations with "Eastern Europe" (in the sense of the Warsaw Pact) were decidedly cooler.

Economically, Canada still dealt much more with the United Kingdom than the rest of the continent at end of the war, but this began to change quickly because of the post-war economic booms in France and West Germany combined with British relative decline. At the same time Canada's relations with the United States loomed ever larger, so that relations with UK were no longer so important as to be thought of as separate from European relations, as they had been before. This was confirmed by Canadian refusal to back Britain's position in the Suez Crisis of 1957, and Britain's entry into the European Economic Community in 1973 over Canadian (and Australasian) objections. Canada and Britain still continue to have close ties, however, based on shared history and culture, and share the same head of state and are both members of the Commonwealth.

Canada's commitments to the rest of Europe included NATO-related forces stationed in Germany and Norway, and a series of economic agreements with the EEC starting in 1976.

Since the end of the Cold War, Canada has expanded ties with Eastern Europe, including being the first western country to recognize the independence of the Baltic States and Ukraine from the Soviet Union in 1991.

== Current relations ==
Canada is a member of the NATO alliance committed to defending its fellow members from an attack anywhere in Europe, however Canadian Armed Forces were withdrawn from Norway in 1989 and Germany in 1993 at the end of the Cold War.

Proposals for transatlantic economic and political ties, which Canadian hoped NATO would include in 1949, have not come to fruition. The European Union and the North American Free Trade Association instead represent two divergent trade blocs. However, Canada has signed a free trade agreement with the smaller European Free Trade Association in 2008.

Negotiations for the Comprehensive Economic and Trade Agreement (CETA) between Canada and the European Union concluded in August 2014. The agreement has only been provisionally applied because only 17 EU member states have ratified the agreement as of January 2024. If applied, the agreement would abolish 98 per cent of customs duties on all goods between the EU and Canada.

After Russia's 2014 invasion and annexation of Crimea, NATO members agreed at the 2016 Warsaw summit to deploy four multi-national battalion battle groups to the Baltic states and Poland. Canada provided the core of the Battle Group Latvia through Operation Reassurance. As of 2023, approximately 1,100 Canadian Armed Forces members have been deployed to Camp Ādaži with a plan to deploy a Canadian Army tank squadron equipped with 15 Leopard 2 tanks and increasing the strength of the deployed force to 2,200 by 2026.

In May 2026 Canada became the first non-European country to participate in the European Political Community.

Canada is set to make its debut at the Eurovision Song Contest in 2027.

== Canada's foreign relations with European countries ==
- Albania
- Andorra
- Austria
- Belarus
- Belgium
- Bosnia and Herzegovina
- Bulgaria
- Croatia
- Cyprus
- Czech Republic
- Denmark
- Estonia
- Finland
- France
- Germany
- Greece
- Hungary
- Iceland
- (Republic of Ireland) Ireland
- Italy
- Latvia
- Liechtenstein
- Lithuania
- Luxembourg
- Malta
- Moldova
- Monaco
- Montenegro
- Netherlands
- North Macedonia
- Norway
- Poland
- Portugal
- Romania
- Russia
- San Marino
- Serbia
- Slovakia
- Slovenia
- Spain
- Sweden
- Switzerland
- Ukraine
- United Kingdom
- Vatican City

== See also ==
- Foreign relations of Canada
- Canada–NATO relations
- Canada–European Union relations
- Canada–European Free Trade Association Free Trade Agreement
- European Canadians
- Comprehensive Economic and Trade Agreement
