= Canada in NATO =

International relationship

Canada–NATO relations

- NATO: Canada

Canada has been a member of the North Atlantic Treaty Organization (NATO) since its inception in 1949.

== History ==
Canada is a principal initiator (founding country) of the alliance. This Atlanticist outlook was a marked break with Canada's pre-war isolationism, and was the first peacetime alliance Canada had ever joined.

Canadian officials such as Hume Wrong and Lester B. Pearson and including Prime Minister Louis St. Laurent worked in favour of the alliance because they sought to contain the Soviet Union, as did other members, and because they hoped the treaty would help to eliminate any potential rivalries between the United States, the United Kingdom, and other European great powers (principally at the time France, but later including West Germany), where Canada had to choose sides. This had long been the overriding goal of Canadian foreign policy.

The main Canadian contribution to the North Atlantic Treaty was Article 2 which committed members to maintain a "free" political system and to promote economic cooperation, in addition to the more usual diplomatic and military matters. Trans-Atlantic unity in political and economic matters has not come to fruition, as European states have looked toward the European Union and its antecedents while North America had the North American Free Trade Agreement, later superseded by United States–Mexico–Canada Agreement.

Canada has stationed troops in Germany (at Kaiserslautern) since 1951. During the 1950s Canada was one of the largest military spenders in the alliance and one of the few not receiving direct aid from the United States.

The costs of maintaining forces in Europe combined with those defending its own vast territory and participation in the Korean War caused strain on the Canadian budget during the 1950s.

In August 1968, the Trudeau government expressed disapproval of the Soviet invasion of Czechoslovakia, having the Canadian delegation at the United Nations vote for a resolution condemning the invasion, which failed to pass owing to a Soviet veto. However, Trudeau made it clear that he did not want an intensified Cold War as a result of the invasion, and worked to avoid a rupture with Moscow. In a speech in December 1968, Trudeau asked: "Can we assume Russia wants war because it invaded Czechoslovakia?".

In 1968–1969, Trudeau wanted to pull Canada out of NATO, arguing that the MAD (Mutually Assured Destruction) caused by a Soviet-American nuclear exchange made it highly unlikely that the Soviet Union would ever invade West Germany, thereby making NATO into an expensive irrelevance in his view. In March 1969, Trudeau visited Washington to meet President Richard Nixon, where the meeting went very civilly, through Nixon came to intensely dislike Trudeau over time, referring to him in 1971 as "that asshole Trudeau" Nixon made it clear to Trudeau that a Canada that remained in NATO would be taken more seriously in Washington than a Canada that left NATO. Trudeau himself noted during a speech given before the National Press Club during the same visit that the United States was by far Canada's largest trading partner, saying: "Living next to you is in some way like sleeping with an elephant; no matter how friendly and even-tempered the beast, one is affected by every twitch and grunt".

In 1969 then Prime Minister Pierre Trudeau withdrew half of Canada's forces in Europe, even as many leftist intellectuals and peace activists called for a complete withdrawal from NATO.

The NATO question badly divided the cabinet. The diplomat Marcel Cadieux accused Trudeau of being "ne semble pas croire du tout au danger soviétique". As a diplomat, the devout Catholic Cadieux had served on the International Control Commission in 1954–55, where his experiences of witnessing the exodus of 2 million Vietnamese Catholics from North Vietnam to South Vietnam made him into a very firm anti-Communist. In late March 1969, Trudeau's cabinet was torn by debate as ministers divided into pro-NATO and anti-NATO camps, and Trudeau's own feelings were with the latter. The Defence Minister Léo Cadieux threatened to resign in protest if Canada did leave NATO, leading Trudeau who wanted to keep a French-Canadian in a high-profile portfolio such as the Defence department, to meet Cadieux on 2 April 1969 to discuss a possible compromise. Trudeau and Cadieux agreed to the compromise that Canada would stay in NATO, but drastically cut back its contributions, despite warnings from Ross Campbell, the Canadian member of the NATO Council, that the scale of the cuts envisioned would break Canada's treaty commitments. Ultimately, the fact the United States would be more favourably disposed to a Canada in NATO and the need to maintain cabinet unity led Trudeau to decide, despite his own inclinations, to stay in NATO. After much discussion within the cabinet, Trudeau finally declared that Canada would stay within NATO after all on 3 April 1969, but he would cut back Canada's forces within Europe by 50%. The way that Canada cut its NATO contributions by 50% caused tensions with other NATO allies with the British government of Prime Minister Harold Wilson making a public protest at the cuts.

Trudeau had an especially close friendship with the Social Democratic West German Chancellor Helmut Schmidt, whom he greatly liked both for his left-wing politics and as a practical politician who was more concerned about getting things done rather than with ideological questions. Schmidt was sympathetic towards Trudeau's "rebalancing" concept, telling Trudeau that he wanted West Germany to have two North American partners instead of one, and promised at a 1975 meeting to use West German influence within the EEC to grant Canada better trade terms in exchange for Canada spending more on its NATO commitments. After meeting Schmidt, Trudeau performed a volte-face on NATO, speaking at a press conference of how much he valued NATO as an alliance that was established for collective security in Europe. To show his approval of Schmidt, Trudeau not only agreed to spend more on NATO, but insisted that the Canadian Army buy the German-built Leopard tanks, which thereby boosted the West German arms industry, over the opposition of the Finance department, which felt that buying the Leopard tanks was wasteful. Schmidt's support was especially welcome as Wilson, once again back as the British prime minister, proved unwilling to lobby for the EEC lowering tariffs on Canadian goods, merely saying that he was willing "to interpret Canadian policy" to the other EEC leaders. By contrast, the West German Foreign Minister Hans-Dietrich Genscher gave Trudeau a firm promise of West German support for an EEC-Canadian economic agreement. The major hold-out was France, which was stoutly opposed to an EEC-Canadian agreement, seeing giving EEC market access to Canadian agriculture as a threat to French agriculture. In July 1976 a Canadian-EEC Framework Economic Agreement was signed, which came into effect on 1 October 1976. Trudeau hoped the Framework Agreement would be the first step towards a Canadian-EEC free trade agreement, but the EEC proved to be uninterested in free trade with Canada.

With the success of the Canadian participation in the Suez Crisis, with the United Nations Peacekeeping Force in Cyprus and on other UN peacekeeping missions like the United Nations Assistance Mission for Rwanda, United Nations Operation in Somalia I and Unified Task Force United Nations Operation in Somalia II or the four-year commitment to United Nations Angola Verification Mission II, perception in the 1990s evolved into the feeling that the forces had shifted from conventional warfighting to peacekeeping missions.

The bulk of Canada's military was focused on the less-glamorous NATO mission in Germany, where there remained a brigade group and an air division. In all, over 5,000 soldiers at any given time were deployed until 1993, when the remaining Canadian troops were withdrawn from Europe by the government of Brian Mulroney following the end of the Cold War. The peace dividend was spent elsewhere than on the military.

Given the small size of Canada's military, most contributions to NATO were political but, during NATO's 1999 Kosovo War, Canadian CF-18 jets were involved in the bombing of Yugoslavia.

Since it began in 2001 Canadian troops were part of the NATO-led mission in Afghanistan, ISAF.

In March 2011, the Canadian Forces participated in NATO-led UN missions in Libya.

In 2019 it came to light that Canadian governments of the 21st century have been relative lightweights in the Alliance.

In July 2022, Canada became the first country to approve the accession of Finland and Sweden to NATO.

== Canada's foreign relations with NATO member states ==
- Albania
- Belgium
- Bulgaria
- Croatia
- Czech Republic
- Denmark
- Estonia
- Finland
- France
- Germany
- Greece
- Hungary
- Iceland
- Italy
- Latvia
- Lithuania
- Luxembourg
- Montenegro
- Netherlands
- North Macedonia
- Norway
- Poland
- Portugal
- Romania
- Slovakia
- Slovenia
- Spain
- Sweden
- Turkey
- United Kingdom
- United States

== See also ==
- Foreign relations of Canada
- Foreign relations of NATO
