= Canada–Yugoslavia relations =

Canada–Kingdom of Yugoslavia relations
- Canada: Yugoslavia

Canada–Yugoslavia relations
- Canada: Yugoslavia

Canada and Yugoslavia

Canada and Yugoslavia had bilateral relations from 1942 to 1992. As the two countries were in opposing blocs during the Cold War, relations were initially distant, but began to develop after Yugoslavia split from the Eastern Bloc and created the Non-Aligned Movement.

Following the breakup of Yugoslavia, Canada established diplomatic relations with its successor states: Bosnia and Herzegovina, Croatia, North Macedonia, Montenegro, Serbia and Slovenia.

Both Canada and Yugoslavia were among 51 original members of the United Nations.

== History ==
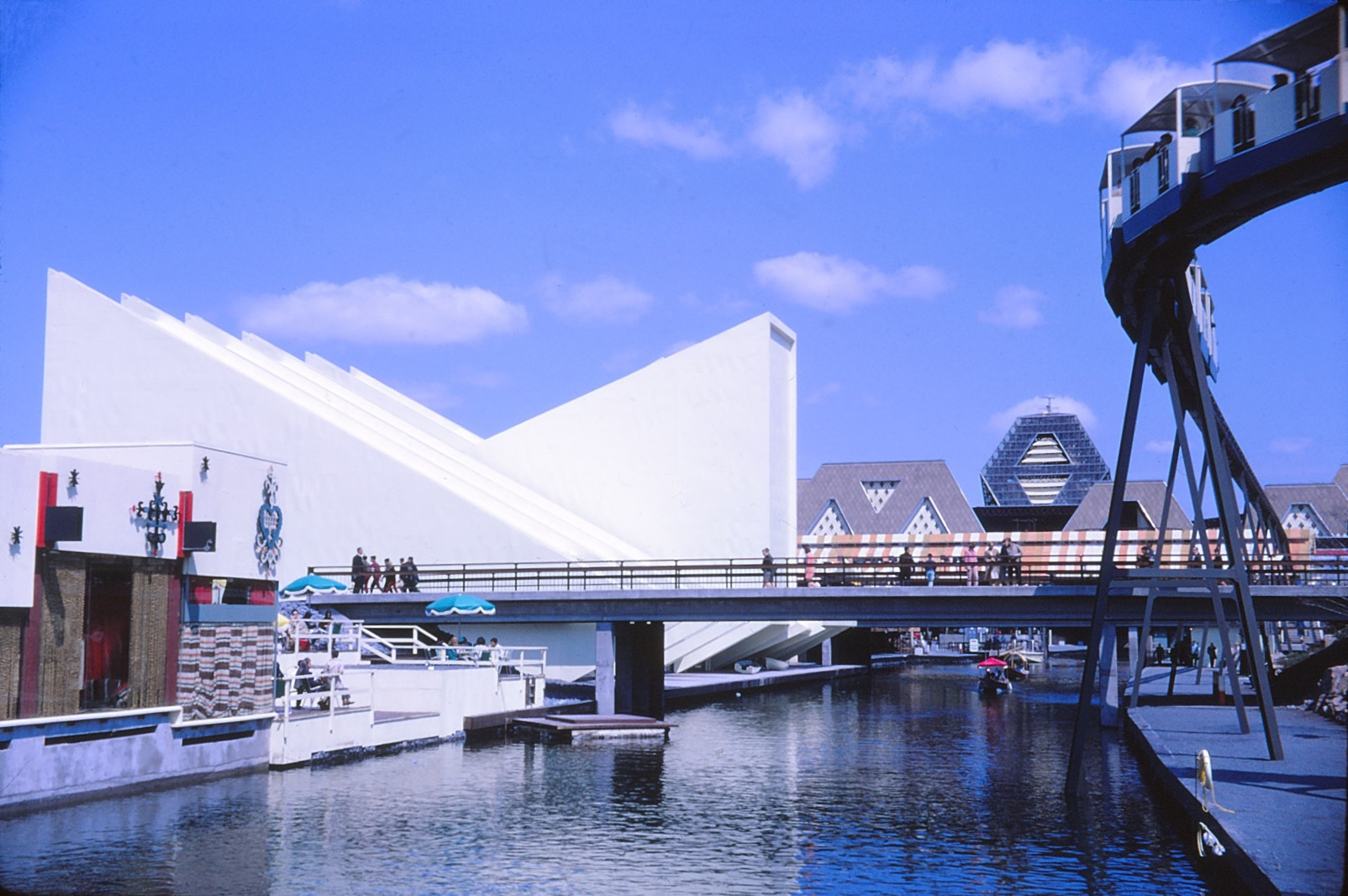
Yugoslav Pavilion at the Expo 67.

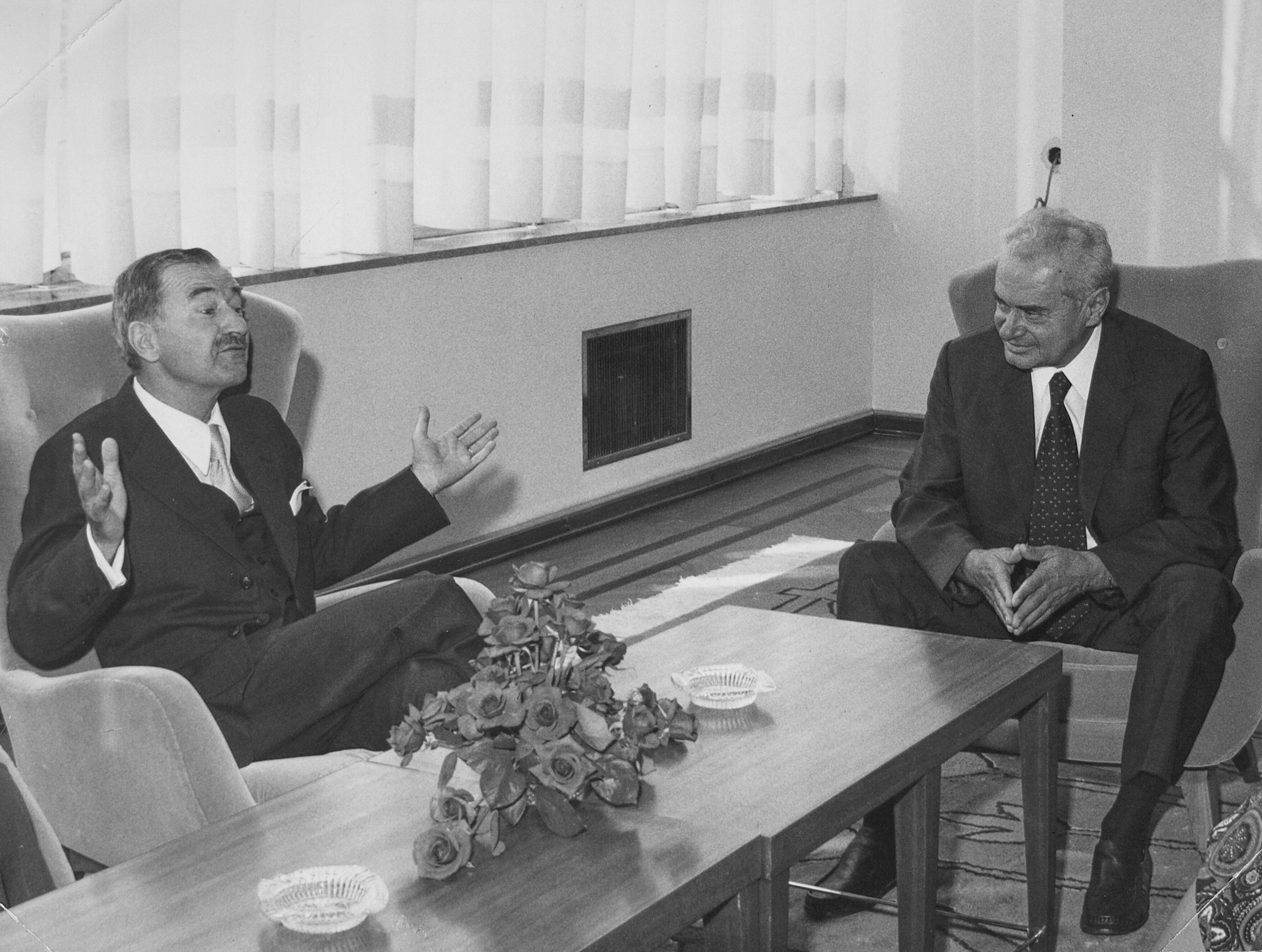
Keith MacLellan in Yugoslavia

Canada established formal bilateral relations with the Yugoslav government-in-exile on 9 February 1942 during World War II. Canada followed earlier decisions by the United States and United Kingdom and in December 1945 officially recognized the new Yugoslav communist government. Planning for a Canadian diplomatic mission in Yugoslavia began in late 1947, and once opened the mission in Belgrade was the second mission in the Balkans after the one in Athens, Greece. While Canada disagreed with Yugoslav official Marxist social framework the country still believed that Yugoslavia would respond favorably to Canadian initiatives in the United Nations where cooperation was developed.

Relations developed following the 1948 Tito–Stalin split, when Canada started to perceive Yugoslavia as an entry point from which to challenge Soviet hegemony in Eastern Bloc countries. Relations were however cautious due to dissatisfaction of the Yugoslav side with the fact of right-wing nationalist and World War II revisionist Yugoslav Canadian emigration. In addition, while Canada was firmly entrenched with the Western Bloc, Yugoslavia promoted a policy of equidistance between superpowers and played a prominent role in development of the Non-Aligned Movement.

During the 1949 United Nations Security Council election, Canada strongly advocated on behalf of Yugoslav candidacy.

== See also ==
- Yugoslavia–European Communities relations
- Death and state funeral of Josip Broz Tito
- Bosnia and Herzegovina–Canada relations
- Canada–Croatia relations
- Canada–Montenegro relations
- Canada–North Macedonia relations
- Canada–Serbia relations
- Canada–Slovenia relations
- Yugoslav Canadians
  - Croatian Canadians
  - Serbian Canadians
  - Macedonian Canadians
  - Slovene Canadians
  - Bosnian Canadians
  - Montenegrin Canadians
- Yugoslavia at the 1976 Summer Olympics
- Canada at the 1984 Winter Olympics
- Yugoslavia at the 1988 Winter Olympics
