= Lithuanian Canadians =

Kanados lietuviai (Lithuanian) Lituano-canadiens (French)

Total population
- 46,690^{1}(2006)

Regions with significant populations
- Ontario: 29,315 (2011)
- Alberta: 5,310
- Quebec: 5,155
- British Columbia: 5,740
- Manitoba: 1,495
- Saskatchewan: 735
- Nova Scotia: 955
- New Brunswick: 255

Languages
- Canadian English, Lithuanian, Québécois French

Religion
- Roman Catholicism, Romuva, Lutheranism, Judaism

Related ethnic groups
- Lithuanians, Lithuanian Americans, and Prussian Lithuanians^{1} *11,425 solely of Lithuanian origin, 35,260 of mixed origin.

Lithuanian Canadians (Lithuanian: Kanados lietuviai) are Canadians who are of full or partial Lithuanian descent. Over two-thirds of Lithuanian Canadians reside in Toronto, with other much smaller populations scattered around most of the Canadian provinces and territories.

== History ==
The first documented Lithuanians in Canada were Lithuanians who fought in the British Army in Canada (1813–1815). Lithuanian immigrants to Canada came primarily for economic reasons, arriving between 1905-1940. The second wave of Lithuanians came after World War II, with most of the immigrants seeking to escape Communism after the unilateral Soviet incorporation of Lithuania into its boundaries. The third wave of immigrants began after the restoration of Lithuania's independence (1990), and have continued to arrive.

== Concentration ==
The majority of Lithuanian Canadians reside in Toronto. Other well-rooted populations of moderate size can be found in urban Ontario (particularly Mississauga and Hamilton), Montreal in Quebec, Alberta, Manitoba, and Nova Scotia. Lithuanian Canadians are present in 37 Canadian municipalities. Other groups have migrated to British Columbia, New Brunswick, Saskatchewan, the Northwest Territories, and Yukon.

== Organization ==
The Lithuanian Canadian Community (Lithuanian: Kanados Lietuvių Bendruomenė), the largest Lithuanian Canadian association in Canada, has 17 chapters throughout Canada.

== Religion ==
The descendants of the first and second waves of Lithuanian immigration are predominantly Roman Catholic, while a minority are Romuva or Evangelical Lutheran. A considerable percentage of Lithuanian Canadians have reverted to the indigenous Lithuanian religion (which has been revived as Romuva), particularly third-wave immigrants. There are two Roman Catholic parishes for Lithuanian Canadians, two Romuva groups, one Evangelical Lutheran congregation, and some minorities of Lithuanian-Jewish descent.

== Notable people ==
- Daina Augaitis – curator whose work focuses on contemporary art.
- Kevin Bieksa – former ice hockey player
- Iggy Brazdeikis – basketball player for the University of Michigan Wolverines of NCAA Division I
- Boris Birshtein – businessman
- Paul Cargnello – singer-songwriter
- Casey Cizikas – ice hockey player
- Raymond Filip – poet, writer
- Birutė Galdikas – biologist; contributed to the creation of a sanctuary for orangutans in Indonesia
- Ieva Kibirkštis – soccer manager, former player
- Joe Krakauskas – baseball player
- Ruta Lee – actress and dancer; appeared as one of the brides in the film Seven Brides for Seven Brothers
- Jarid Lukosevicius – ice hockey player
- Paul Rabliauskas - comedian
- Andy Rautins – basketball player for the Bahçeşehir Koleji of the Turkish Basketbol Süper Ligi (Basketball Super League); one of four sons of retired NBA player Leo Rautins
- Leo Rautins – former basketball player; former head coach of the Canadian national men's basketball team; NBA analyst for the Toronto Raptors; his son Andy was drafted by the New York Knicks in 2010
- Naomi Snieckus – actress
- Nik Stauskas – basketball player for the Cleveland Cavaliers of the NBA; also plays for the Canadian national men's basketball team
- Annis Stukus – former Canadian football player, coach and general manager, and ice hockey general manager
- Bill Stukus – CFL quarterback
- Alissa White-Gluz - singer-songwriter, animal rights activist and human rights activist; former lead singer of The Agonist and former lead singer of the Swedish metal band Arch Enemy (her grandmother was from Lithuania)
- Alex Zaliauskas – track and field athlete at the 1992 Summer Olympics

== See also ==
- Canada–Lithuania relations
- Lithuanian diaspora
- Ethnic origins of people in Canada
- European Canadians
- Lithuanian Americans
- Lithuanians in the United Kingdom
