= Canada–Serbia relations =

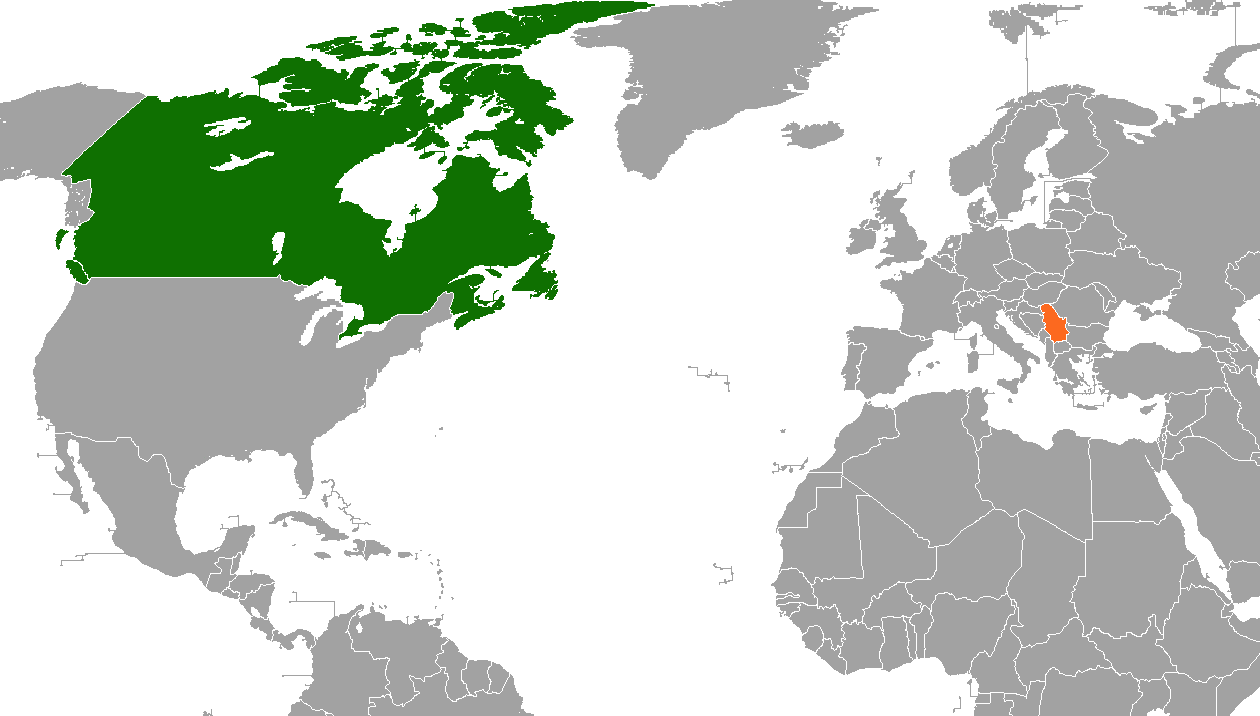

- Canada: Serbia

Canada and Serbia maintain diplomatic relations established between Canada and the Kingdom of Yugoslavia in 1922. From 1938 to 2006, Canada maintained relations with the Kingdom of Yugoslavia, the Socialist Federal Republic of Yugoslavia (SFRY), and the Federal Republic of Yugoslavia (FRY) (later Serbia and Montenegro), of which Serbia is considered shared (SFRY) or sole (FRY) legal successor.

== Economic relations ==
Trade between two countries amounted to $106 million in 2023; Serbia's merchandise export to Canada were about $73 million; Canada's exports were standing at $32 million.

== Immigration from Serbia ==
According to the 2021 Census there were 93,360 people in Canada who identified as having Serb ancestry, making it a significant group within the global Serb diaspora. The Serbian Canadian community is heavily concentrated (about two-thirds) in Ontario, with major hub in Greater Toronto Area where a third of all Serbian Canadians reside, while Niagara Falls has the highest share (1.5% of total population) of Serbian population of any Canadian city.

== Resident diplomatic missions ==
- Canada has an embassy in Belgrade.
- Serbia has an embassy in Ottawa and a consulate general in Toronto.
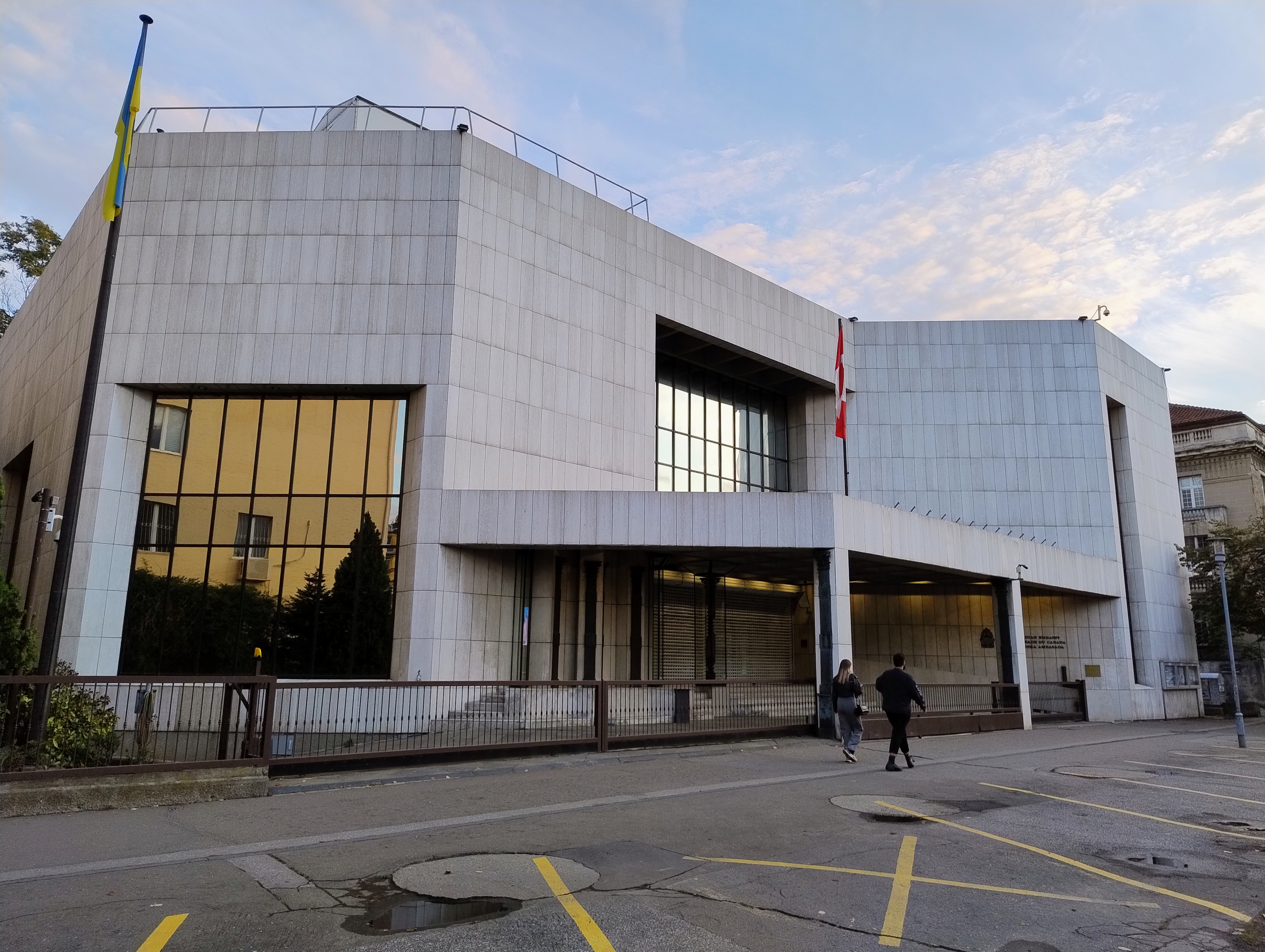
Embassy of Canada in Belgrade

== See also ==
- Foreign relations of Canada
- Foreign relations of Serbia
- Canada–Yugoslavia relations
