= Embassy of Canada, Zagreb =

Diplomatic mission of Canada to Croatia

Embassy of Canada to Croatia
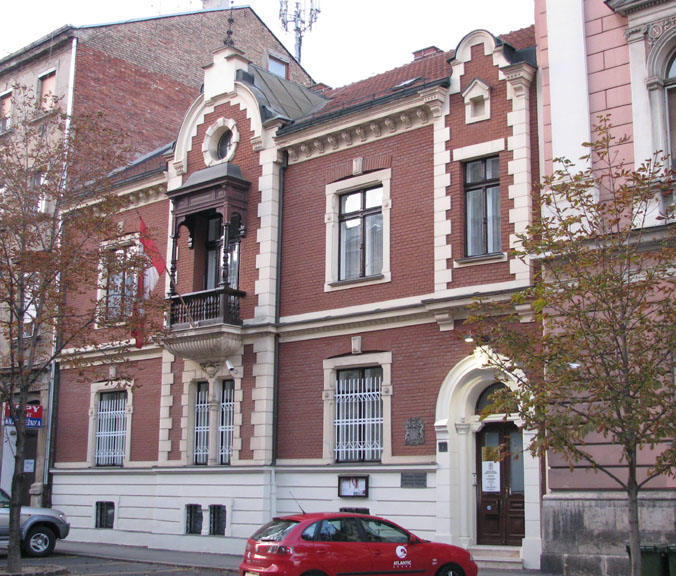
- Location: Zagreb, Croatia
- Address: Prilaz Gjure Deželića 4
- Coordinates: 45°48′37.5″N 15°58′5.5″E
- Ambassador: Alan Bowman
- Jurisdiction: Croatia; Kosovo
- Website: Official website

The Embassy of Canada to Croatia in Zagreb is the diplomatic mission of Canada to Croatia. This embassy also represents Canadian diplomatic relations with Kosovo. Visas for immigration to Canada are not processed in Zagreb, as they are processed at the Visa Section of the Embassy of Canada to Austria in Vienna.

== Building ==
The building in which the embassy is located is rented from the Serbian orthodox Metropolitanate of Zagreb and Ljubljana. The building was built between 1886 and 1887, and it was architecturally designed by Kuno Waidmann.

By the beginning of the War in Croatia, the building was the seat of the metropolitanate and its museum, archive and library. On April 11, 1992, the building was dynamited, after which the seat of the metropolitanate was moved to another building. After the metropolitanate restored the building, they rented it to the embassy.
