= Bosnia and Herzegovina–Canada relations =

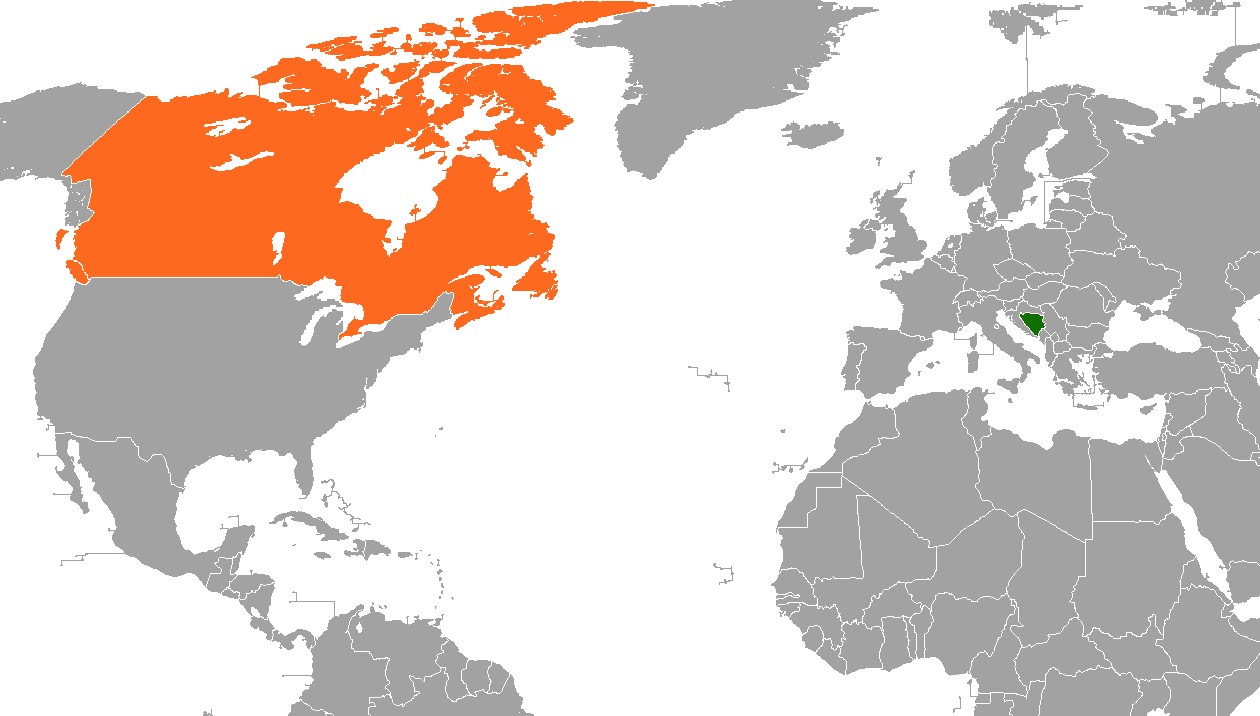

- Bosnia and Herzegovina: Canada

Envoy

Bosnia and Herzegovina and Canada established bilateral relations in 1992. Bosnia and Herzegovina has an embassy in Ottawa. Canada has a non resident ambassador in Budapest.

== Peacekeeping ==
Since 1992, more than 40,000 Canadians have served in Bosnia-Herzegovina in Operation Harmony for the United Nations and in Operation Palladium for NATO. 25 Canadians have lost their lives while serving in Bosnia-Herzegovina

In 1992, more than 1,500 Canadian troops were sent to act as peacekeepers in the Bosnian War. As of the fall of 1999, about 1,300 Canadian troops remained in Bosnia-Herzegovina as part of the NATO-led Operation Joint Endeavour, designed to enforce the Dayton Peace Accord of 1995.

== Diaspora ==
According to the 2016 Canadian Census, there were over 38,000 people in Canada who identified as having Bosnian ancestry.

== See also ==
- Foreign relations of Bosnia and Herzegovina
- Foreign relations of Canada
- Bosnia-NATO relations
- Canada–Yugoslavia relations
