= Canada–Hungary relations =

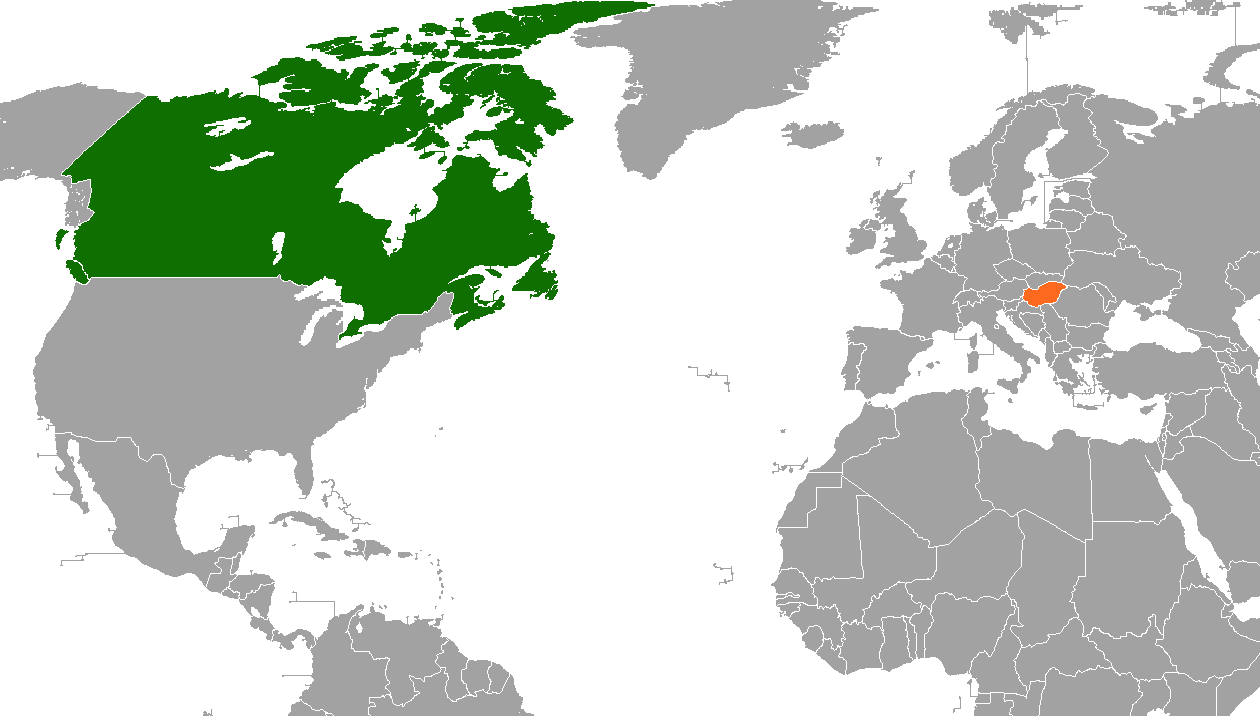

- Canada: Hungary

Bilateral relations between Canada and Hungary are centred on the history of Hungarian migration to Canada. Approximately 300,000 Canadians have Hungarian ancestry. Both nations are members of NATO, OECD and UN.

== History ==
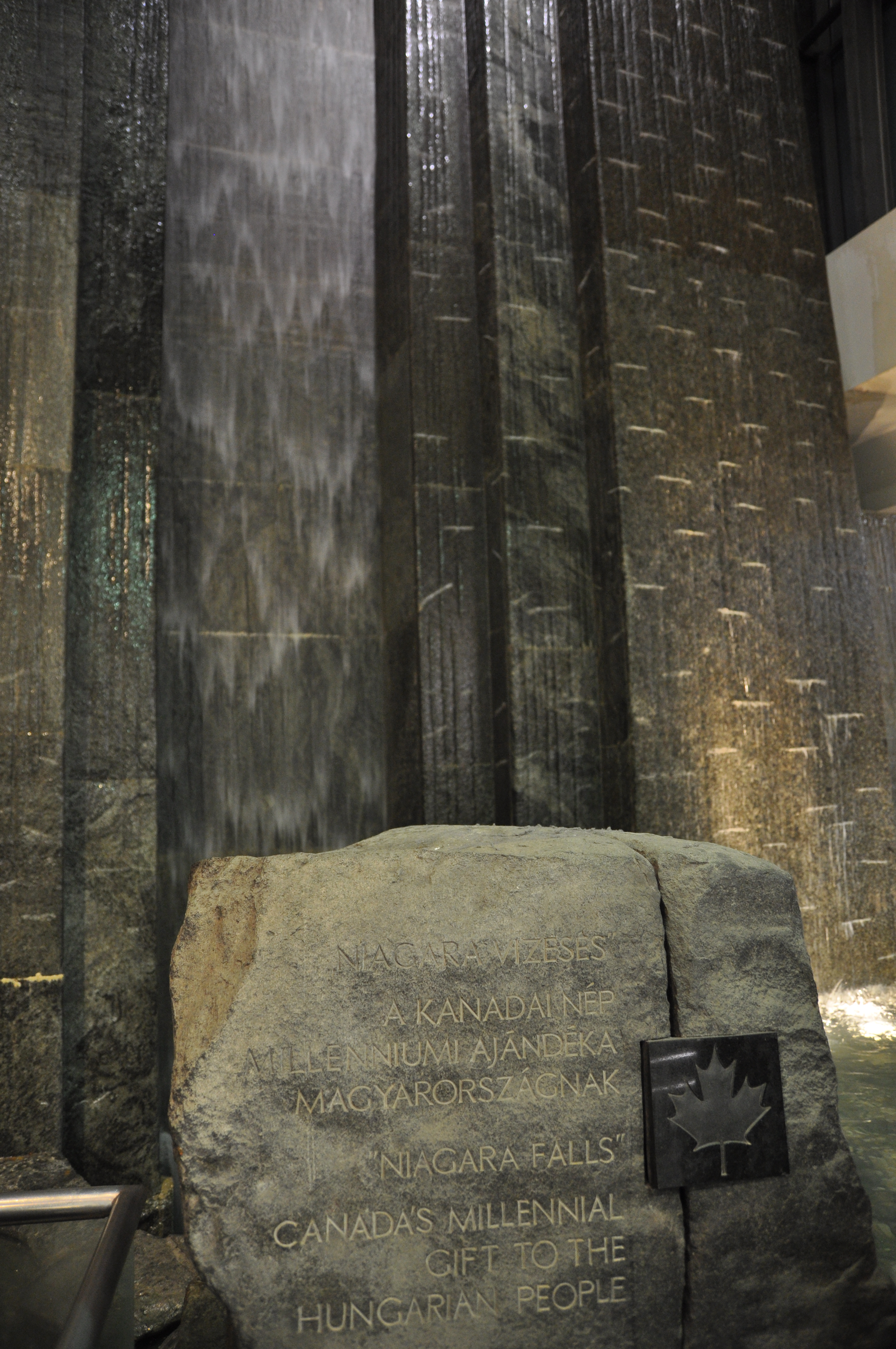
Canada's Millennial Gift to the Hungarian People

The first contact between Canada and Hungary was through Hungarian migrants immigrating to Canada in the early 19th century and settling mainly in Ontario and in the Prairie Provinces. In 1867, Canada became a confederated state and that same year, Hungary joined Austria and created the Austro-Hungarian Empire. Initially, all official contact between Canada and the empire was conducted via-London.

In August 1914, the United Kingdom declared war on the Austro-Hungarian Empire and Germany. Canada joined British forces and fought together during World War I. At the end of the war in 1918, Hungary became an independent nation. During World War II, Canadian and Hungarian troops fought against each other during the Western Allied invasion of Germany. At the end of the war, Hungary became a communist state. Between 1948 and 1952 some 12,000 postwar displaced Hungarians arrived to Canada.

As a result of the Hungarian Revolution of 1956, over 30,000 Hungarians left Hungary in 1956 and 1957 and emigrated to Canada which was one of the few countries to receive them. In 1964, Canada and Hungary officially established diplomatic relations and in 1965, Canada sent its first resident ambassador to Hungary. In 1989, Hungary became a free and democratic country and in July 1990, occupying Soviet troops left the country. There have also been several high-level visits between both countries. During the 1990s, the Canadian government spent money on advertisements in Hungary in order to dissuade Hungarians from immigrating to Canada.

In 2014, Canada and Hungary celebrated 50 years of diplomatic relations.

In November 2022, the fifth Orbán government appointed János Bencsik Consul General in Toronto, but he was denied a visa from Canada due to his far-right past with the party Jobbik, and therefore he was unable to take up his post. In 2025, he was instead made a senior diplomat at the embassy in Copenhagen.

== High-level visits ==
High-level visits from Canada to Hungary

- Governor General Ray Hnatyshyn (1993)
- Prime Minister Paul Martin (2004)
- Governor General Michaëlle Jean (2008)

High-level visits from Hungary to Canada

- President Árpád Göncz (1991)
- Prime Minister Viktor Orbán (1999)
- President László Sólyom (2007)

== Agreements ==
Both nations have signed several bilateral agreements such as an Agreement on the Enhancement and Protection of Foreign Investments (1991), Agreement on the Elimination of Double Taxation (1992), Criminal Legal Aid Treaty (1995), and an Agreement on Aviation (1998).

== Trade ==
In 2018, trade between Canada and Hungary totaled $871 million Canadian dollars. Canada's main exports to Hungary include: electrical machinery, vehicles, optical and medical equipment and plastics. Hungary's main exports to Canada include: machinery, pharmaceutical products, electrical machinery, vehicles, and optical and medical equipment. Canadian company Linamar, one of Canada's largest automobile industry suppliers, employs 2,300 workers in Hungary and is expanding its operations in the country. In October 2016, Canada and the European Union (which includes Hungary) signed a free trade agreement known as the "Comprehensive Economic and Trade Agreement".

== Resident diplomatic missions ==
- Canada has an embassy in Budapest.
- Hungary has an embassy in Ottawa and a consulate-general in Toronto.
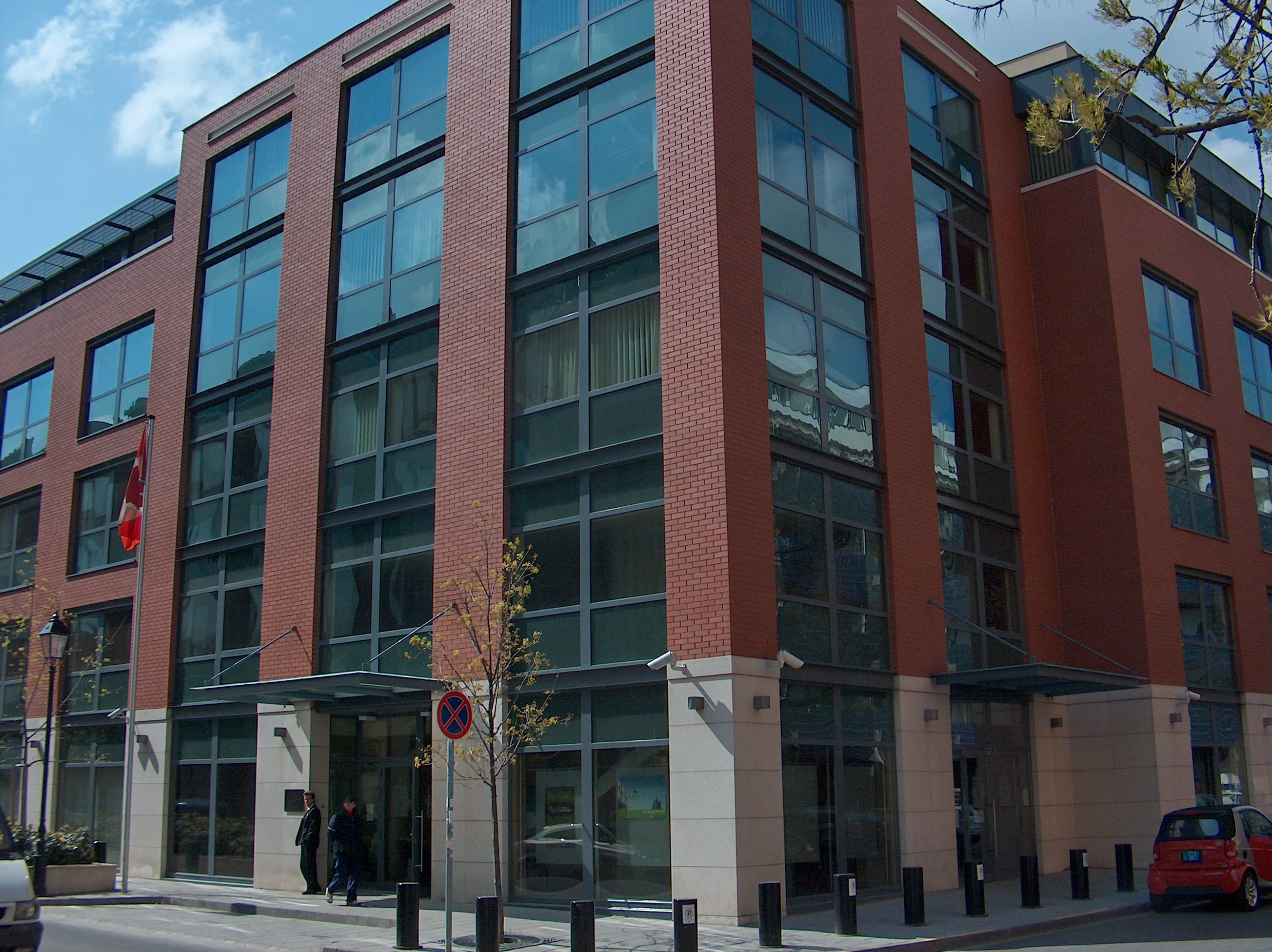
Embassy of Canada in Budapest

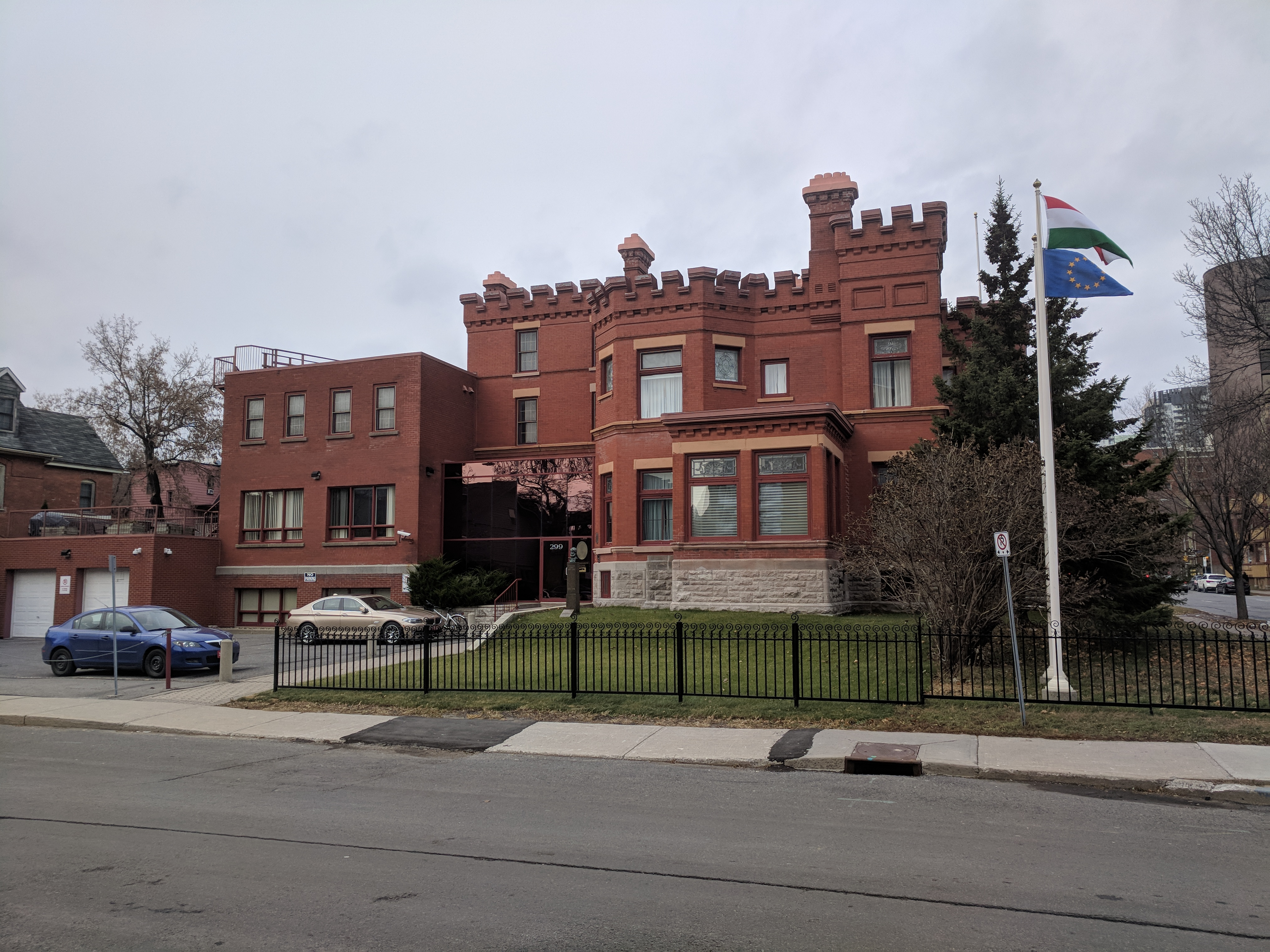
Embassy of Hungary in Ottawa

== See also ==
- Foreign relations of Canada
- Foreign relations of Hungary
- Canada-EU relations
- NATO-EU relations
- Hungarian Canadians
