= Canada–North Macedonia relations =

- Canada: North Macedonia

Canada–North Macedonia relations are the bilateral relations between Canada and North Macedonia. The Republic of North Macedonia became independent in 1991, with Canada beginning relations with the country since then. Around 43,000 Canadians identified as Macedonian in the 2016 census. Canada supports Accession of North Macedonia to the EU.

Canada's presence in North Macedonia is through its embassy in Serbia and a consulate in Skopje. North Macedonia opened an embassy in Ottawa in 1996.

== Trade and investment relations ==
In 2023, trade reached $29 million, with significant Canadian exports of pork and beef. The United Macedonian Diaspora promotes investment collaboration through programs like ‘Macedonia 2025’.

== Resident diplomatic missions ==
- Canada is accredited to North Macedonia from its embassy in Belgrade, Serbia.
- North Macedonia has an embassy in Ottawa and a consulate-general in Toronto.

== See also ==
- Foreign relations of Canada
- Foreign relations of North Macedonia
- Canada–Yugoslavia relations
