= Belgium–Canada relations =

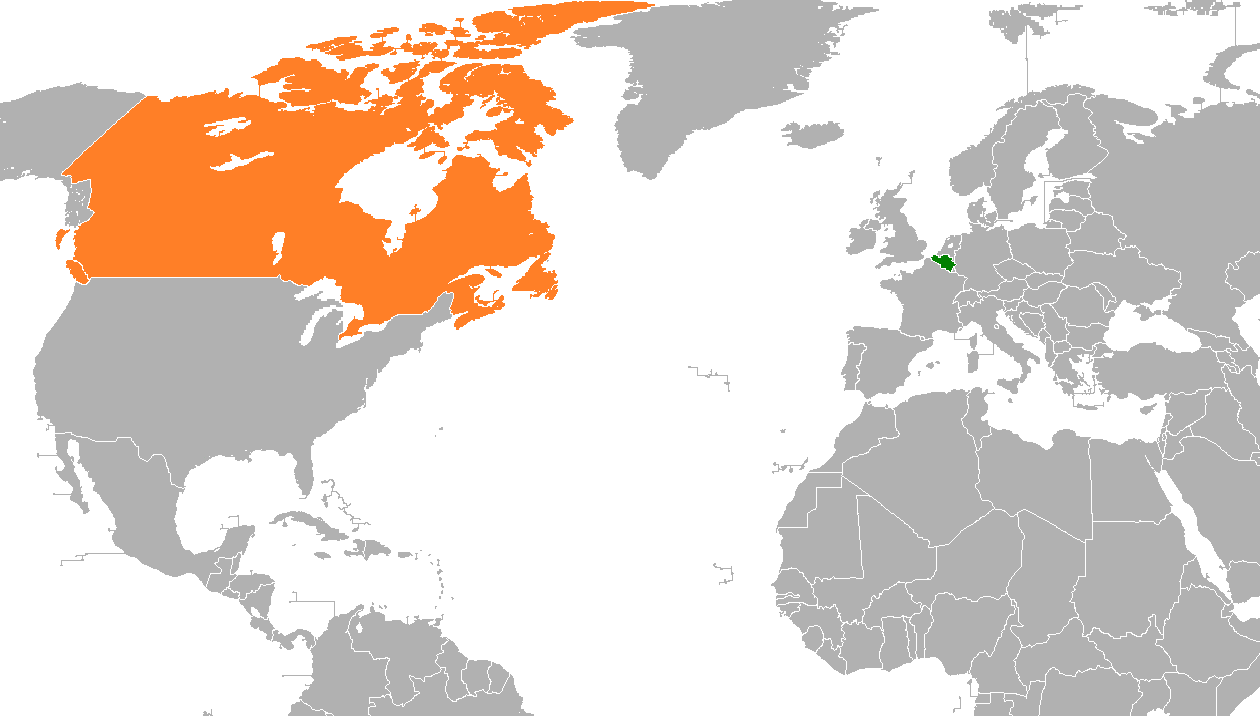

- Belgium: Canada

Diplomatic mission
- Belgian Embassy, Ottawa: Canadian Embassy, Brussels

Envoy
- Raoul Roger Delcorde: Olivier Nicoloff

Belgium and Canada are close allies. Both have a stance of multilateralism and are members of NATO and Francophonie. Both countries are constitutional monarchies ruled by branches of the House of Saxe-Coburg and Gotha (Canada being a Commonwealth realm in a personal union with the United Kingdom in sharing the House of Windsor as their ruling dynasties, while Belgium being ruled by the House of Belgium). The two nations have official bilingualism (with French being one of the official languages), and similar federal government systems owing in part to language tensions in both. Both were actively involved in the war in Afghanistan under ISAF.

== History ==
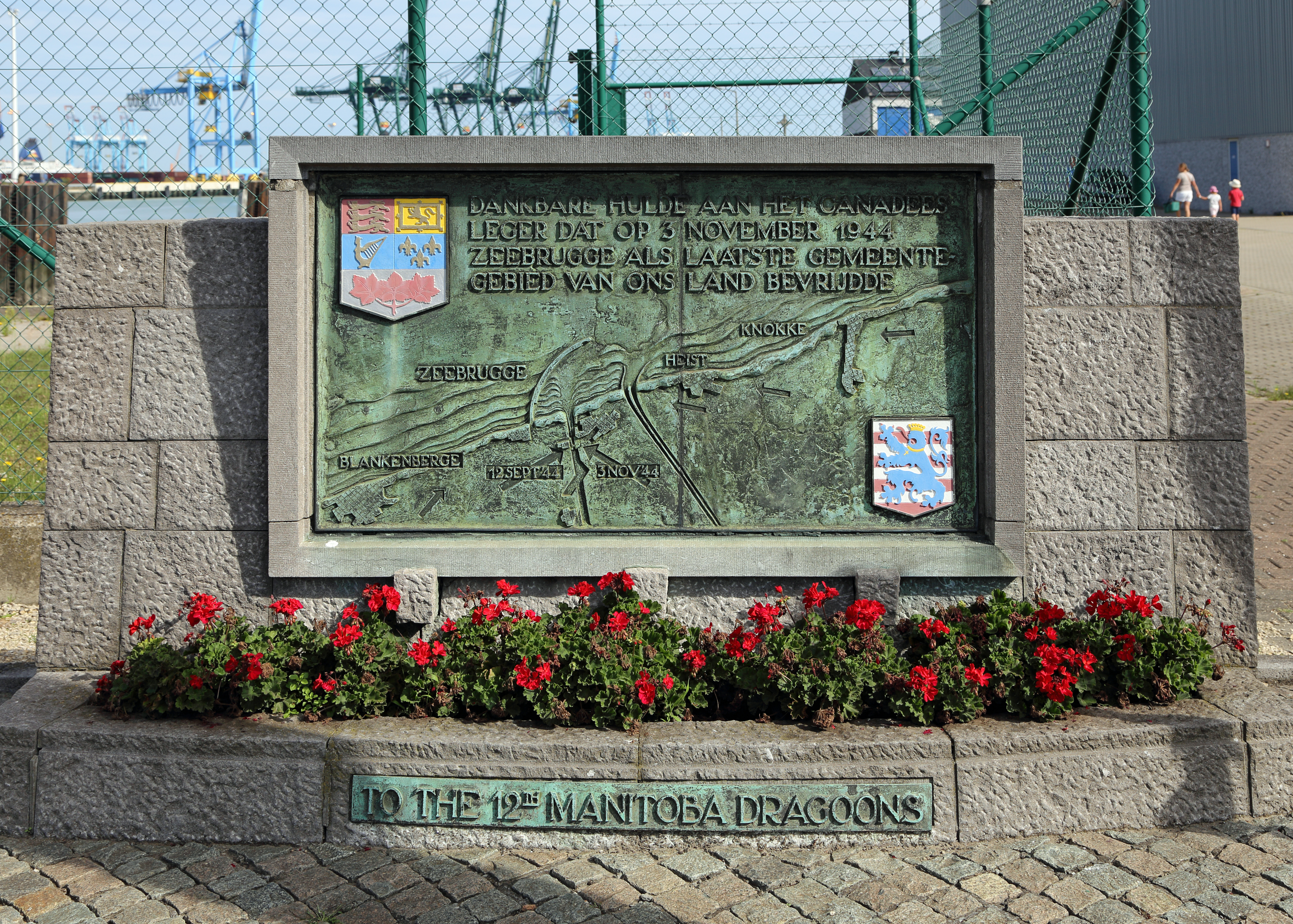
Monument to the 12th Manitoba Dragoons in Zeebrugge, Belgium. The Dutch inscription means: "Grateful thanks to the Canadian Army, that on November 3 1944, Zeebrugge became the last town in our country to be freed".

A few Belgians came to New France before 1759. In the mid-19th century there were enough arrivals to open part-time consulates in Montreal, Quebec City and Halifax. After 1859 the main attraction was free farm land. After 1867 the national government gave immigrants from Belgium a preferred status, and encouraged emigration to the Francophone Catholic communities of Quebec and Manitoba. Edouard Simaeys became a part-time paid Canadian agent in Belgium to publicize opportunities in Canada and facilitate immigration. The steamship companies prepared their own brochures and offered inexpensive package deals to farm families. By 1898 there was a full-time Canadian office in Antwerp which provided pamphlets, lectures and specific travel advice. By 1906 some 2000 Belgians a year were arriving, most with skills in agriculture. A third wave of immigration took place after 1945, with urban areas the destination. The 1961 census counted 61,000 Canadians of Belgian ancestry.

To provide financial support to Belgian immigrants suffering setbacks, the Société belge de bienfaisance was established in 1921 in Montréal. In 1936–7, it was merged into the newly founded Association Belgique-Canada. The association's level of activity has fluctuated over the years, being more active in the 1940s, less so in the 1970s. The last recorded AGM took place in 2011.

Belgian immigration to western Canada in the late 19th and early 20th century attracted the attention of the Belgian government. It enacted laws and regulations to protect the emigrants and guarantee adequate shipboard conditions. Provision was made to assist emigrants who decided to return to Belgium. Starting in the 1860s consular officials made on-site visits to inspect conditions in Canada, which eagerly welcomed the new arrivals. The Catholic Church was likewise welcoming, and a number of priests immigrated. The Walloon immigrants discovered they could continue to speak French in Canada, while the Flemish quickly learned English. The Belgians formed no national organization on their behalf. Some settled in towns such as St. Boniface, Manitoba, but most became farmers who specialized in dairy farming, sugar beets and market gardening. After 1920 there was a move to western Alberta, with an economy based on ranching, horse breeding, and sugar beets.

=== World Wars ===
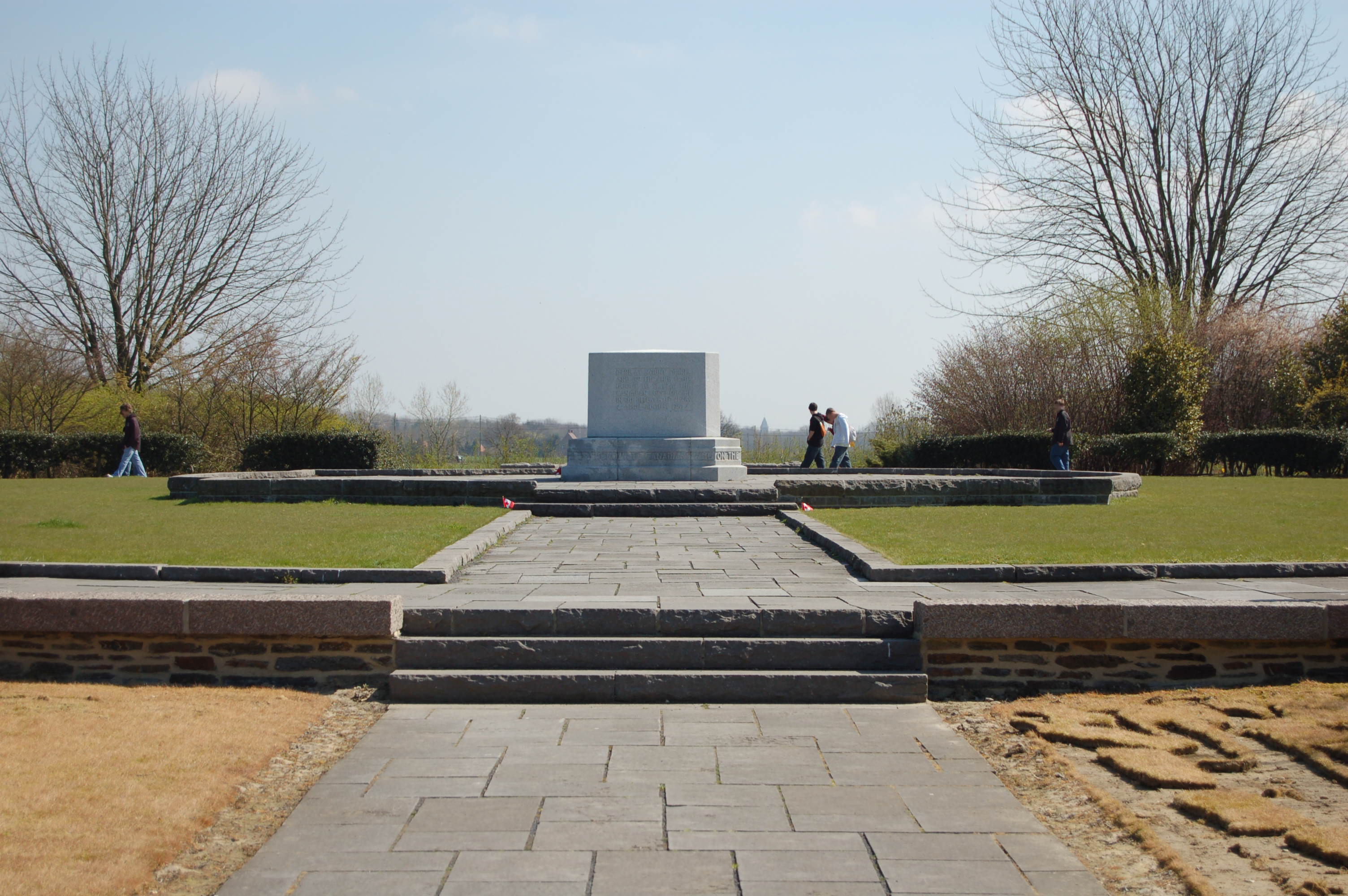
Hill 62 Memorial in Belgium commemorates the Battle of Mont Sorrel, in which Canadian troops took part

During the First World War, a realignment of the great powers made allies of Canada, which was part of the British Empire, and Belgium.

Some of the Canadian Expeditionary Force spent the First World War on Belgian soil and helped Belgium to repel the German invasion. It was in Belgium, at Mont Sorrel, that one of the most famous battles in Canadian history took place.

In the Second World War, Canada and Belgium were initially allies against Nazi Germany and Fascist Italy. In November 1944, as a consequence of Operation Overlord, the Belgian port of Zeebrugge was liberated from the Germans by Canada's 12th Manitoba Dragoons, and a memorial commemorates the event.

== Trade ==
Bilateral investment in 2006 was $5.9 billion. Luxembourg included, the total was $8.4 billion. Belgium exported a total $2.35 billion in 2006 in goods. Belgian exports include fuels, diamonds and mineral oils, vehicles, machinery and pharmaceutical products. The same year Canada exported $2.84 billion in goods. Canadian exports include diamonds, nickel, machinery, oil and zinc. Belgium was Canada's 5th biggest export destination within the EU during that year.

Antwerp is one of the main ports of entry for Canadian goods to the EU.

Belgian and Canadian universities have many partnerships. More than 20 Canadian universities partner with their Belgian counterparts in an array of fields ranging from health to social sciences.

== Diplomatic missions ==
Belgium has an embassy in Ottawa, one consulate (in Montreal, the consulate in Toronto was closed in 2014), and four honorary consulates (in Edmonton, Halifax, Vancouver and Winnipeg) located in Canada. Belgium's three regions (Wallonia, Flanders and Brussels) each have their own offices in the Montreal consulate. Wallonia also has a second office in the Toronto consulate, which also represents Flanders and Brussels.

Canada maintains an embassy in Brussels (which also covers Luxembourg). Canada also has a consulate in Antwerp, and Quebec maintains its own separate delegation in Brussels. The Canadian delegations to the European Union and the North Atlantic Treaty Organization are located in Belgium, as Belgium houses the headquarters of each. Luxembourg is often dealt with in tandem to Belgium.

Belgium and Canada are member states of a variety of international organizations. They include: the United Nations, NATO, La Francophonie, the Organization for Security and Co-operation in Europe, and the Organisation for Economic Co-operation and Development.

== Resident diplomatic missions ==
- Belgium has an embassy in Ottawa and a consulate-general in Montreal.
- Canada has an embassy in Brussels.
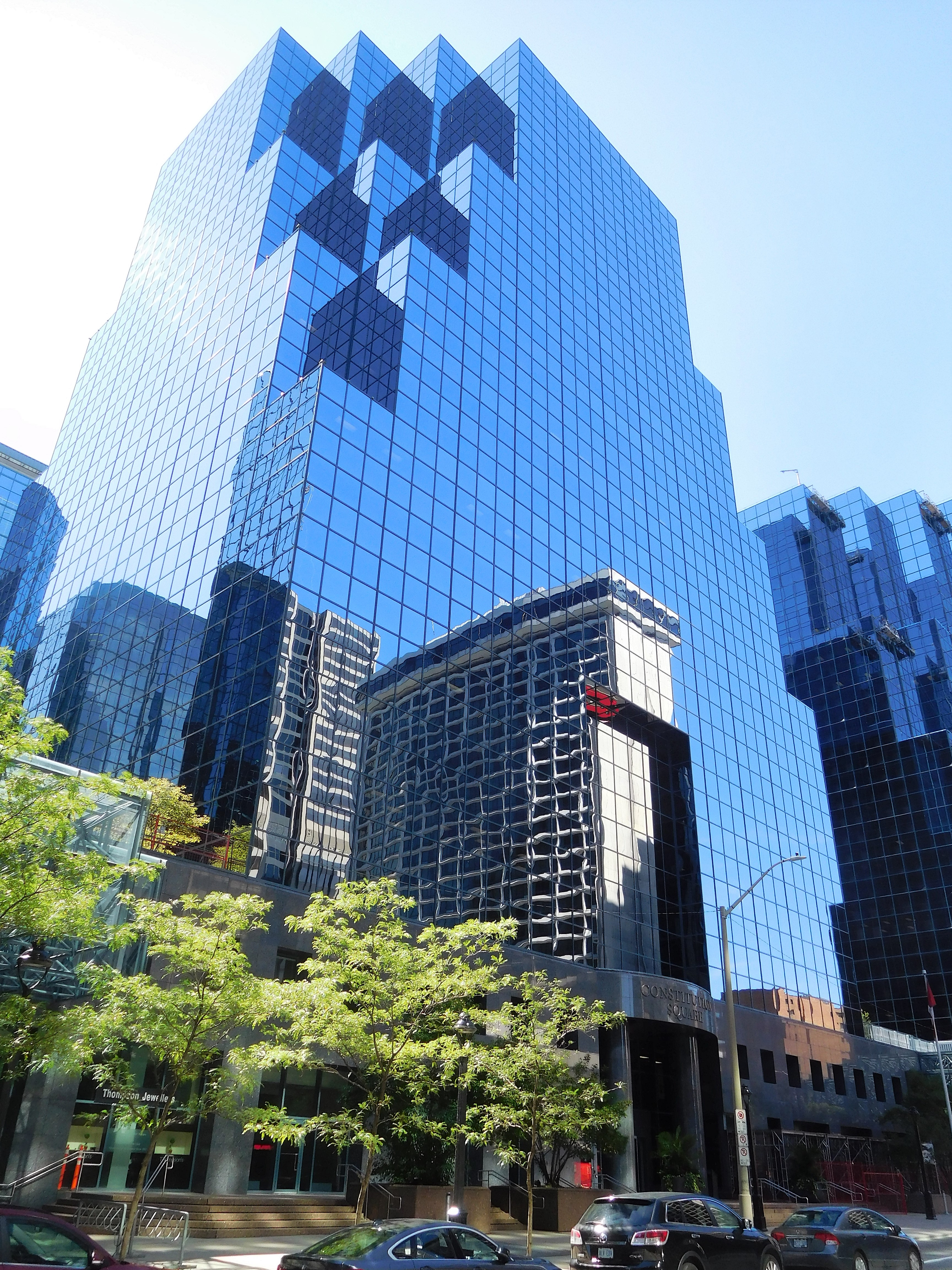
Building hosting the Embassy of Belgium in Ottawa

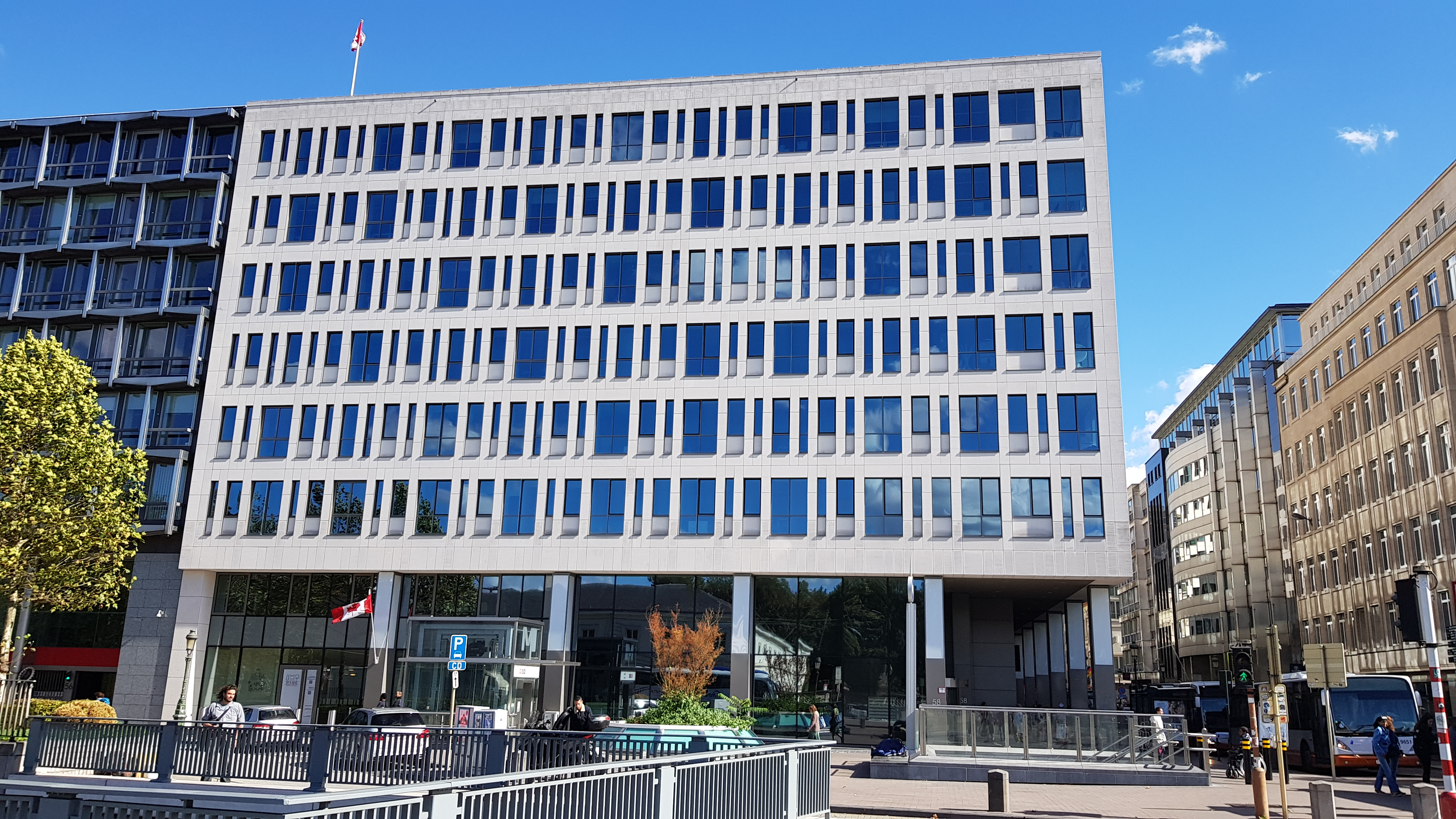
Embassy of Canada in Brussels

== See also ==
- Foreign relations of Belgium
- Foreign relations of Canada
- Comprehensive Economic and Trade Agreement
- Canada-EU relations
- NATO-EU relations
- Belgian Canadians
