= Canada–Luxembourg relations =

- Canada: Luxembourg

Canada–Luxembourg relations are the bilateral relations between Canada and the Grand Duchy of Luxembourg. Both countries are full members of the Organisation for Economic Co-operation and Development, NATO and the Organisation internationale de la Francophonie. Diplomatic relations were established on 3 January 1945

== Overview ==
Canada enjoys a long-standing and strong bilateral relationship with the Grand Duchy of Luxembourg. During World War II, the two countries grew significantly closer, when the family of Charlotte, Grand Duchess of Luxembourg, found refuge in Montreal in 1940 after the German invasion of Luxembourg.

== Trade relations ==
Canada Luxembourg's long-standing friendship has resulted in a strong economic and trade partnership. In 2020, Canada's merchandise exports to Luxembourg totaled $124.0 million. During the same period, Canada's imports from Luxembourg reached $171.7 million.

== Visits ==
In April 2017 Prime Minister of Luxembourg, Xavier Bettel travelled to Ottawa to meet with Prime Minister Justin Trudeau to discuss issues of mutual interest, strengthen commercial ties, and explore how to harness innovation and technology to create jobs in both countries, including by taking advantage of opportunities created by the Canada-European Union Comprehensive Economic and Trade Agreement (CETA).

In February 2026 Prime Minister of Luxembourg, Luc Frieden travelled to Ottawa to meet with Prime Minister Mark Carney, focusing on strengthening bilateral cooperation in financial services, advanced manufacturing, aerospace, and space technologies. The leaders also discussed reinforcing transatlantic security, supporting Ukraine, and establishing the Defence, Security and Resilience Bank (DSR Bank).

== Resident diplomatic missions ==
- Canada is represented in Luxembourg through its embassy in Brussels.
- Luxembourg was represented in Canada through its embassy in Washington, D.C. (US) before it opened its embassy in Ottawa in late 2024.

== See also ==
- Foreign relations of Canada
- Foreign relations of Luxembourg
- Canada-EU relations
- NATO-EU relations
- Luxembourgish Canadians
