= Canada–Montenegro relations =

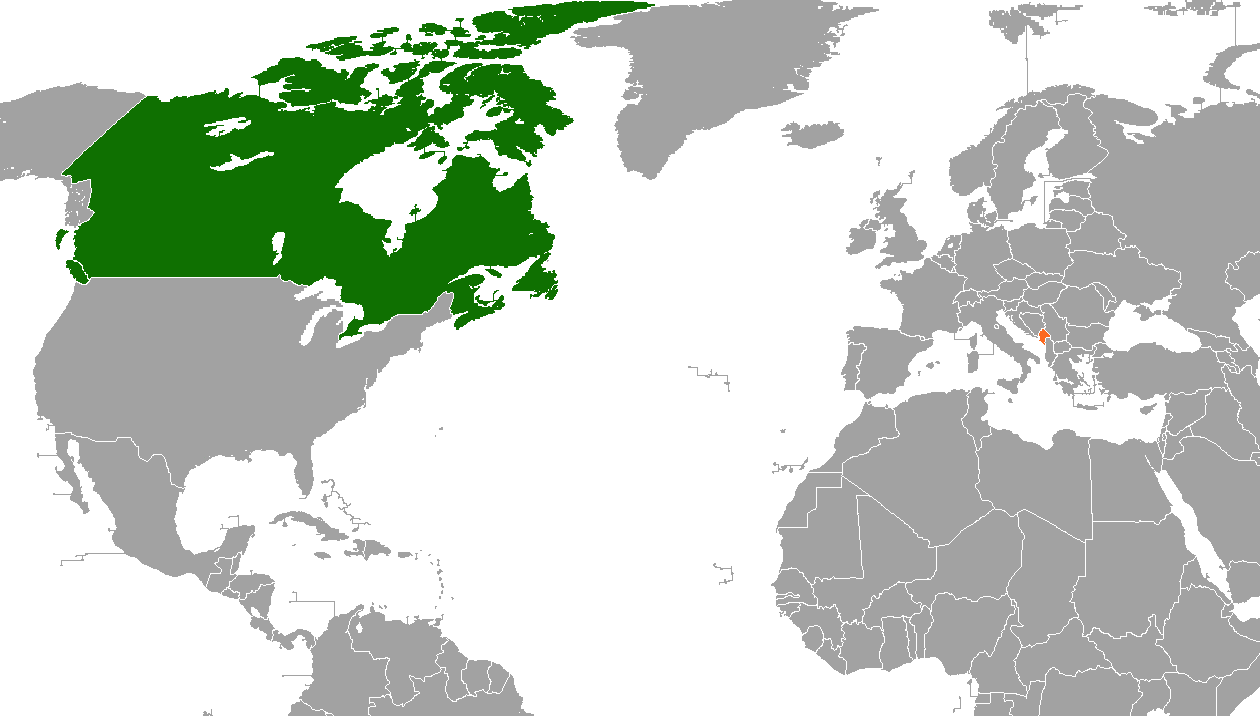

- Canada: Montenegro

Canada officially recognized Montenegro on June 13, 2006. Diplomatic relations between the two countries were established on September 5, 2006.

Since May 3, 2011, ambassador of Montenegro Srđan Darmanović has received accreditation to the assumption of the extraordinary and plenipotentiary ambassador to Canada, and is headquartered in Washington, D.C. The first non-resident Ambassador of Montenegro in Canada, with headquarters in Washington, was Miodrag Vlahović in office from 2007 to 2010.

Roman Vashchuk, the current Canadian Ambassador to Montenegro on non-residential basis with headquarters in Belgrade, handed the credentials to the President of Montenegro, Mr. Filip Vujanovic October 6, 2011. Both countries are full members of NATO.

== Economic Cooperation ==
The most important Canadian investor in Montenegro is Peter Munk, whose company, in Tivat, builds the largest luxury yacht marina on the eastern Adriatic coast - Porto Montenegro. The first part of the Marine opened June 17, 2009. with a capacity of 85 berths for yachts from 12 to 100 meters, and in mid-August 2010 opened the first residential-commercial building Teuta, as part of a new marina. This project is in the fourth year of business success is achieved, which is a positive momentum to attract other foreign investors in Montenegro.

In April 2012, the Canadian company "Molson Coors" has become the new owner of the Niksic brewery "Trebjesa".

On December 8, 2008, as part of the process of accession to the World Trade Organization, Montenegro signed a bilateral trade agreement with Canada.

== Commodity exchanges ==
2012: a total of €1,391,327 (€1,153,292 import to Montenegro, and export to Canada €238,035);

2011: a total of €1,275,211.00 (€1,219,896.28 import to Montenegro, and export to Canada €55,315.00);

Direct investments from Canada in 2012 amounted to €950,929.23;

Direct investments from Canada in 2011 amounted to €1,175,307.94.

Montenegro mostly imports from Canada: ships, boats; boilers; pharmaceutical products, vegetables, roots, tubers. Moreover, Montenegro exports mostly to Canada: a variety of products for nutrition, vegetables; objects of art, collectors' pieces and antiques; electrical machines and equipment.

== Military and Defense Cooperation ==
Montenegro also participates in Department of National Defence's Military Training and Cooperation Program (MTCP). The MTCP is administered by the Department of National Defence to train officers from participating countries in the areas of language proficiency (English and French), peace support operations, staff duties and professional development. Since 2007, 40 Montenegrin candidates have been trained through MTCP. For 2014–2015, four training spots were offered to Montenegro.

== Scientific and cultural cooperation ==
There is cooperation between Munk School of Global Affairs and University of Donja Gorica, in the form of student exchange, study trips and the like.

In the area of scientific and technological cooperation Montenegro is particularly interested in using a number of Canadian scholarships, especially the National Council for Research of Canada, who has developed cooperation around the world. It is present through the offices that Canada has opened in the former Yugoslav republics.

Students of undergraduate studies, graduate students and professors of the Faculty of Tourism and Hotel Management from Kotor had the opportunity to exchange with colleagues from Ryerson University in Toronto.

Agreement on cooperation between the University of Montenegro and the University of Ottawa was signed on April 13, 2006.

== Resident diplomatic missions ==
- Canada is accredited to Montenegro from its embassy in Bucharest, Romania.
- Montenegro is accredited to Canada from its embassy in Washington, D.C., United States.

== See also ==
- Foreign relations of Canada
- Foreign relations of Montenegro
- Canada–Yugoslavia relations
- Montenegrin Canadians
