= Canada–Slovenia relations =

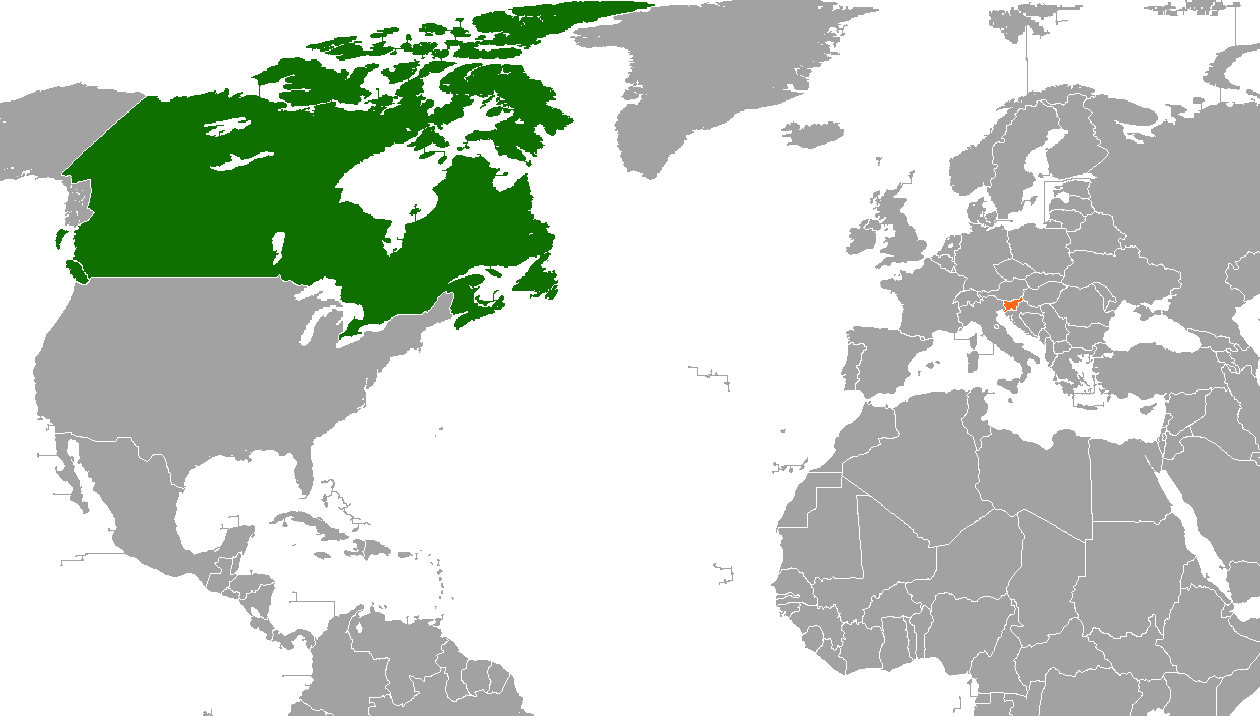

- Canada: Slovenia

Canada recognized Slovenia's independence in January 1992, and established diplomatic relations a year later. Canada is accredited to Slovenia from its embassy in Budapest, Hungary, and a honorary consulate in Ljubljana. while Slovenia has an embassy in Ottawa. Both countries are full members of NATO. There are 40,470 Slovenes who live in Canada as of the 2016 Canada Census.

== State visits ==
Michaëlle Jean, Governor General of Canada made a visit to Slovenia in October 2009.

== Resident diplomatic missions ==
- Canada is accredited to Slovenia from its embassy in Budapest, Hungary and maintains an honorary consulate in Ljubljana.
- Slovenia has an embassy in Ottawa.

== See also ==
- Foreign relations of Canada
- Foreign relations of Slovenia
- Canada-EU relations
- NATO-EU relations
- Canada–Yugoslavia relations
- Slovene Canadians
