= Canada–Greece relations =

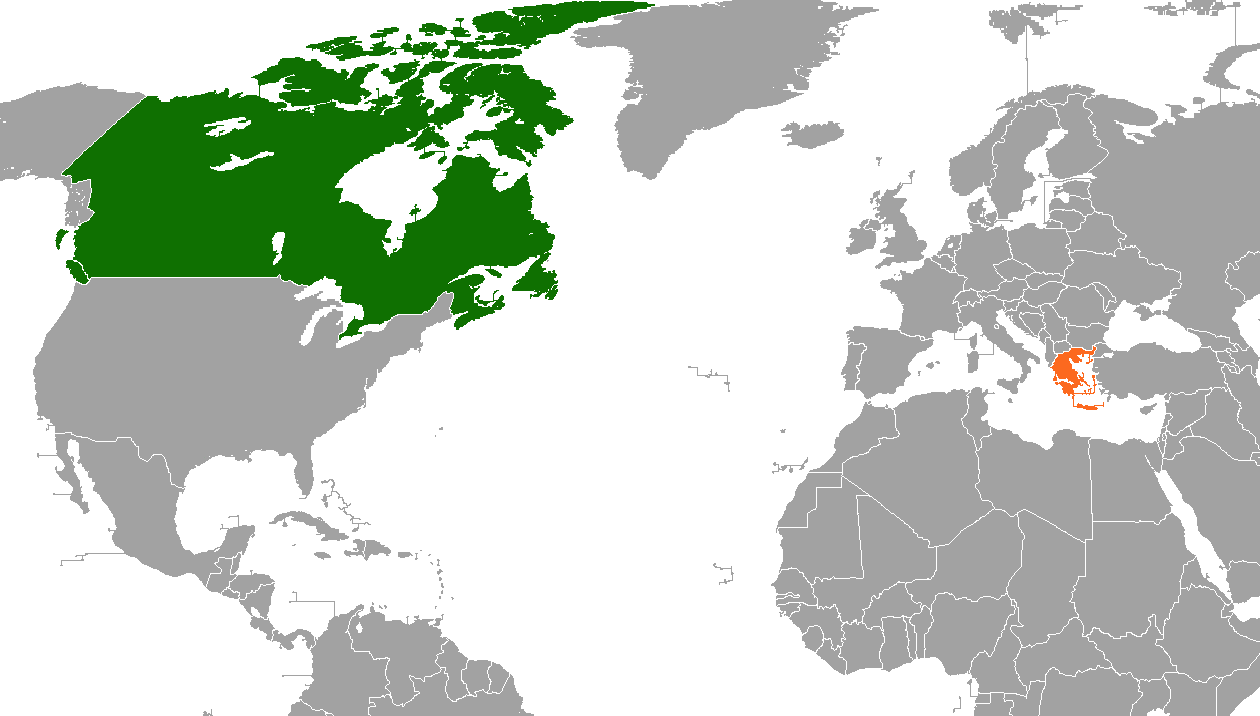

- Canada: Greece

Canada and Greece first exchanged ambassadors in 1942. Both countries are members of the Organisation for Economic Co-operation and Development, Organisation internationale de la Francophonie, Organization for Security and Co-operation in Europe, NATO and the United Nations. There is a strong Greek community living in Canada.

== History ==
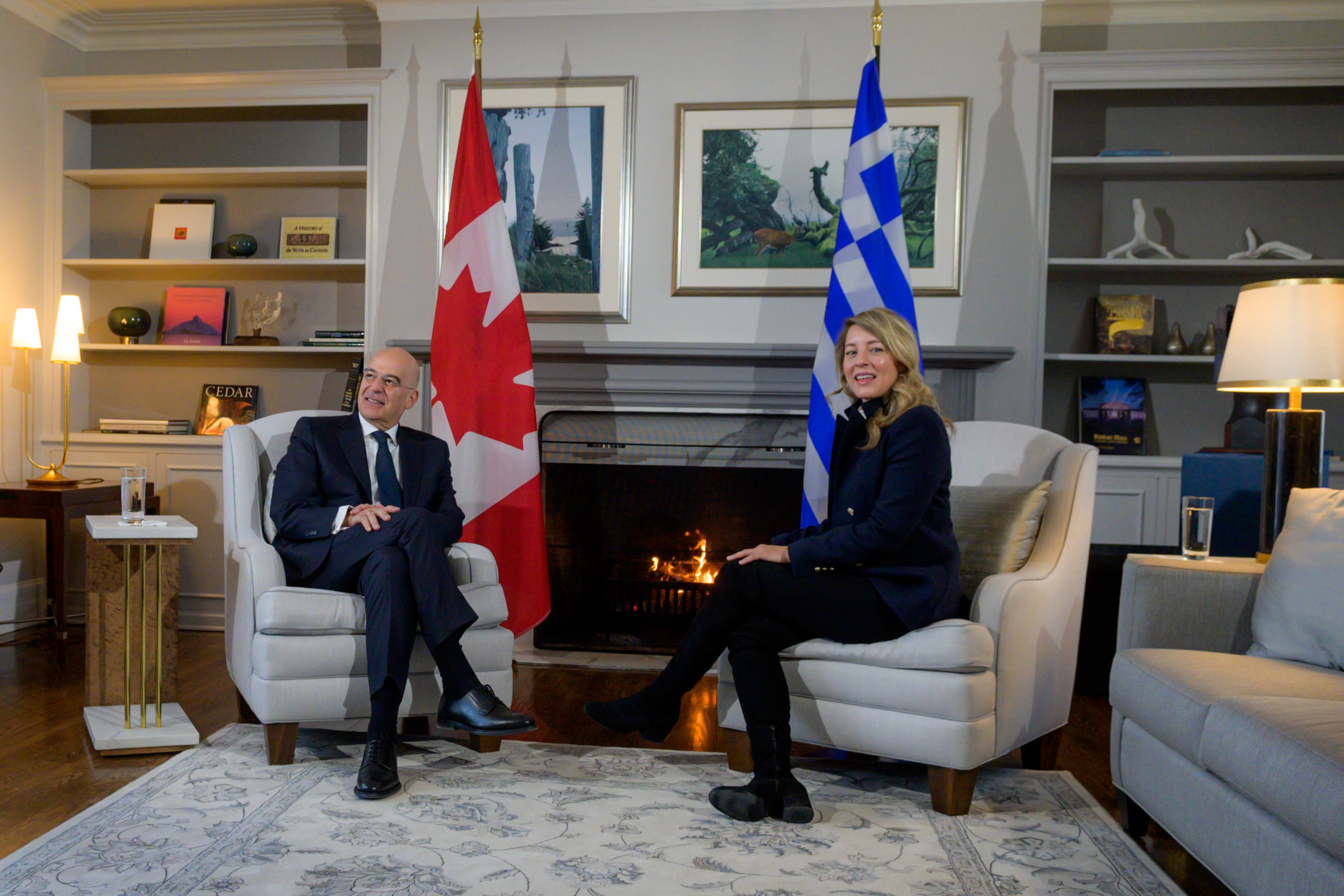
Canadian Foreign Minister Mélanie Joly and Greek Foreign Minister Nikos Dendias in Ottawa; March 2023

Greek immigration to Canada began in 1843 when Greek migrants began arriving and settling in Montreal. Small numbers continued to arrive throughout the 19th century, often working as laborers, peddlers, or in the restaurant trade. By 1911, there were approximately 2,000 Greeks in Canada, a figure that increased during the early 20th century as migrants left Greece due to political instability, economic hardship, and military conflicts such as the Balkan Wars and World War I. Many settled in rapidly growing urban centres including Montreal, Toronto, and Vancouver, forming the foundations of Canadian Greek communities.

Between the 1920s and the 1930s, Greek-owned businesses — particularly diners, cafés, and confectioneries — became common, establishing a lasting cultural presence in Canadian cities. By 1941, over 5,000 Greek migrants resided in Canada.

During World War II both nations fought alongside each other during the Italian Campaign. In 1942, Canada established diplomatic relations with the Greek government-in-exile. Soon afterwards, the two nations opened diplomatic missions in each other's respective capitals.

A much larger wave of Greek immigration took place after the war. From the late 1940s to the early 1970s, tens of thousands of Greeks arrived in Canada, driven by the devastation of the Greek Civil War (1946–1949), economic challenges, and later the military junta (1967–1974). This period transformed Greek communities across the country, particularly in Toronto’s Greektown on the Danforth and Montreal’s Park Extension, which became major centres of Hellenic culture in North America.

By 1971, the Greek-origin population in Canada exceeded 100,000. Greek Canadians became active in business, trades, the arts, academia, and politics, while retaining strong cultural traditions through the establishment of Orthodox churches, language schools, newspapers, and cultural organizations.

Today, over 243,000 Canadians claim Greek descent. The relationship between the two countries continues to be strengthened through trade, tourism, academic exchange, and cultural ties. In 2012, both nations celebrated 70 years since the establishment of mutual diplomatic relations, highlighting a history of cooperation and shared democratic values.

== List of agreements ==
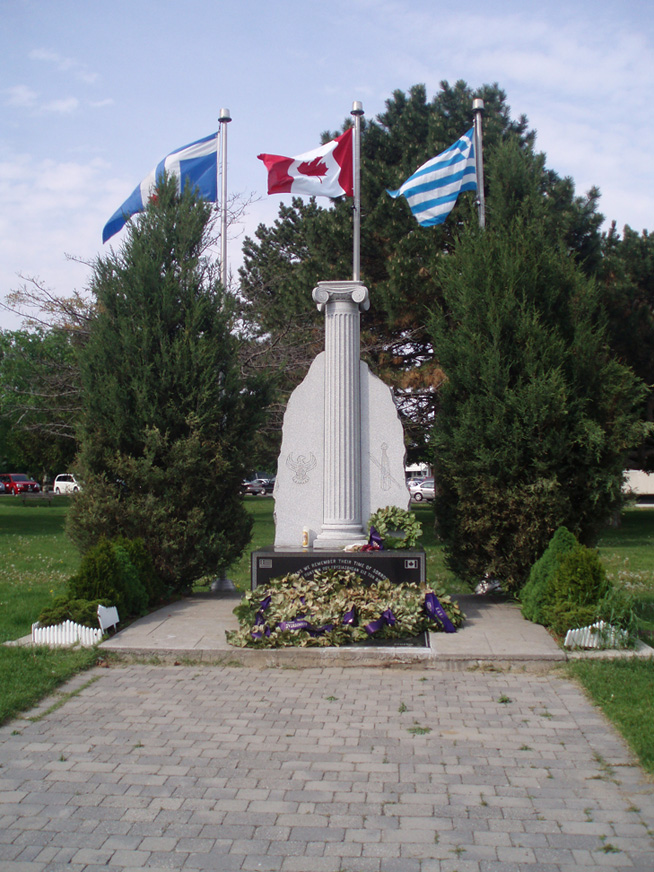
Greek-Canadian monument in Toronto

- Agreement on Taxation of Shipping companies (1929)
- Agreement on Social Security (1981)
- Agreement on Regular Air Transport (1987)
- Revised Agreement on Regular Air Transport
- Agreement on the Avoidance of double taxation

== Trade relations ==
Bilateral merchandise trade between Canada and Greece totaled $647.2 million CAD in 2024. Canada's main exports to Greece are paper, furs, machinery, vegetables, aircraft and pharmaceutical products. Canadian merchandise imports from Greece include preserved food products, aluminium, fats and oils, and fertilizers. Greece's business community with relations to Canada and Canadian companies operating in Greece set up the Hellenic-Canadian Chamber of Commerce in 1996, whose mission is to foster the development of business relations between the two countries in trade, finance, services and investments.

== Resident diplomatic missions ==
of Canada in Greece

- Athens (Embassy)

of Greece in Canada

- Ottawa (Embassy)
- Montreal (Consulate-General)
- Toronto (Consulate-General)
- Vancouver (Consulate-General)

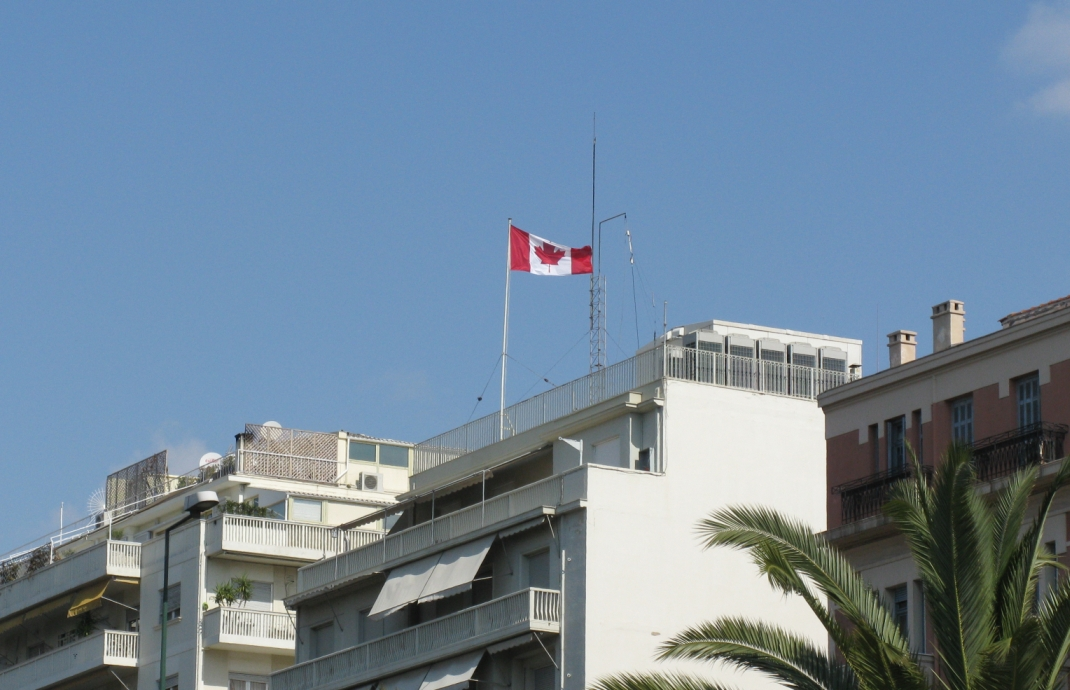
Former embassy building of Canada in Athens

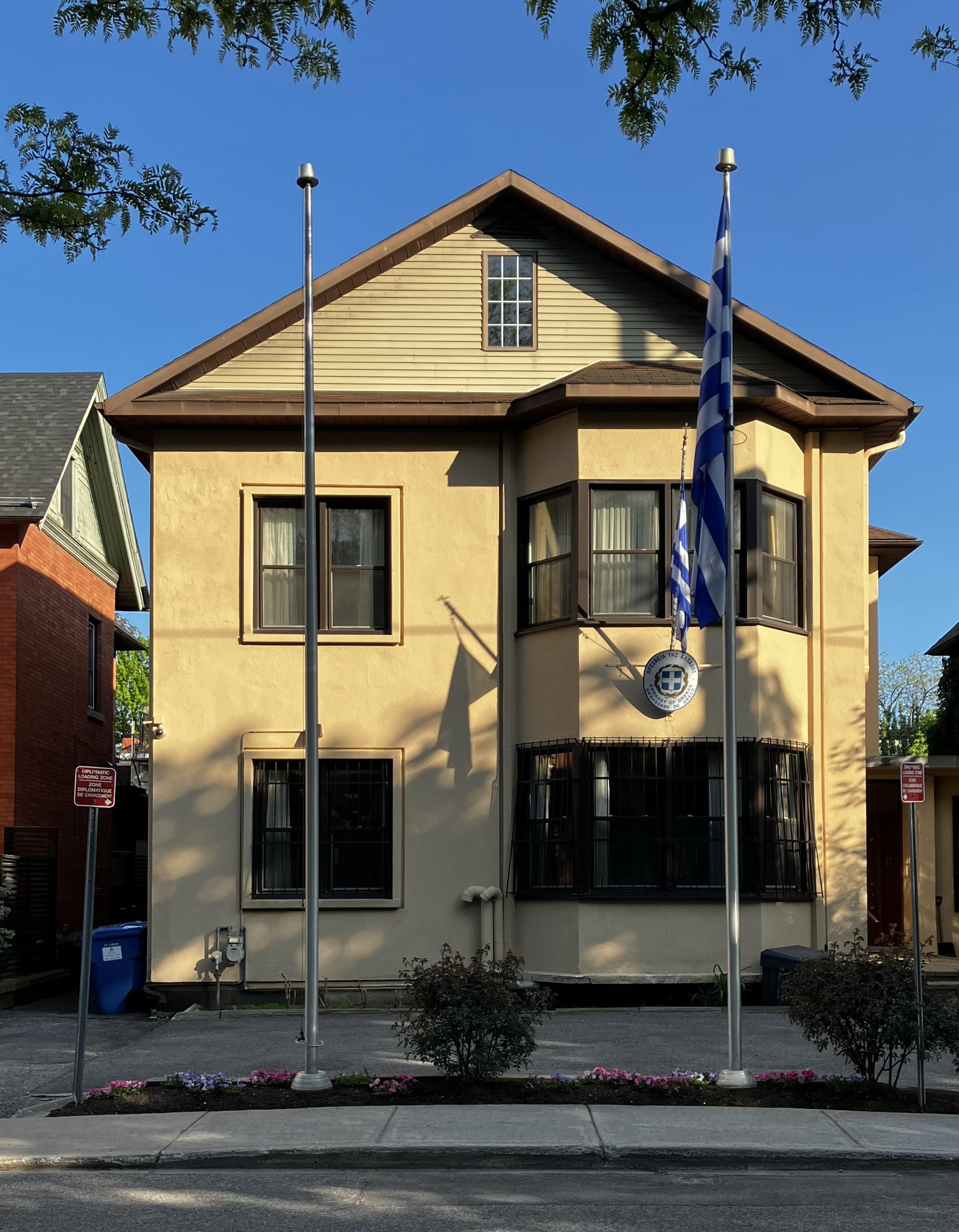
Embassy of Greece in Ottawa

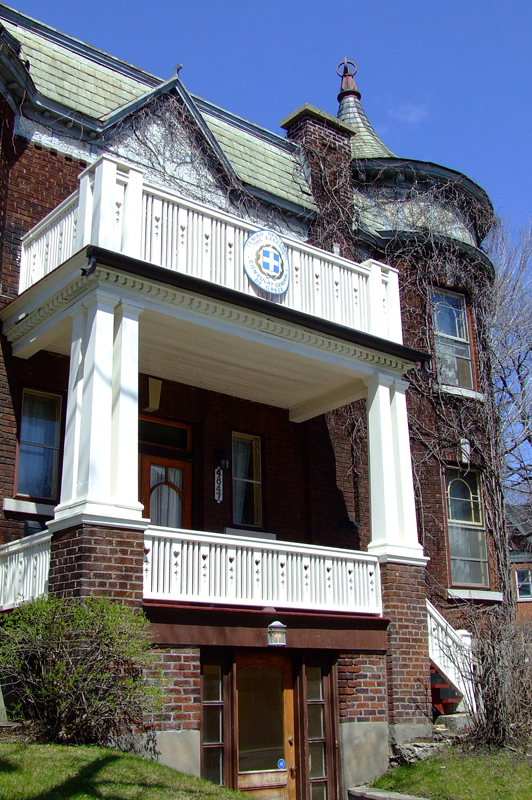
Consulate-General of Greece in Montreal

== See also ==
- Foreign relations of Canada
- Foreign relations of Greece
- Canada-EU relations
- NATO-EU relations
- Embassy of Greece in Ottawa
- Greek Canadians
- Comprehensive Economic and Trade Agreement
