= Canada–Croatia relations =

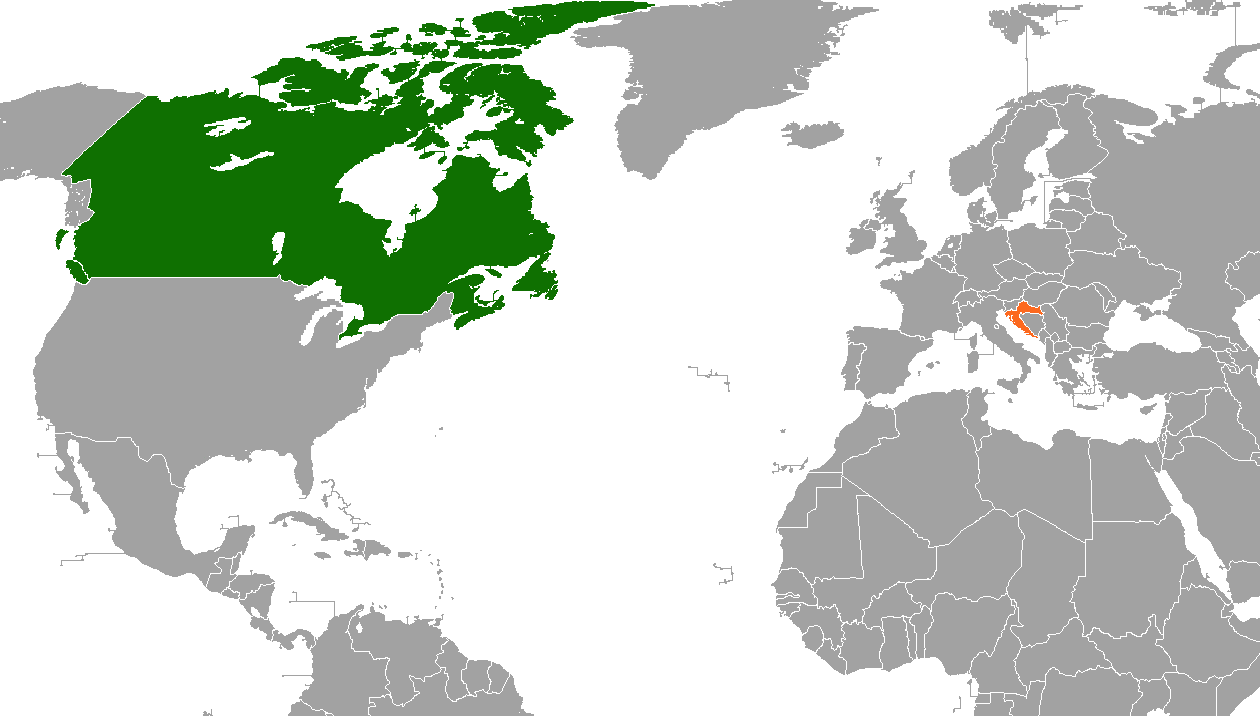

- Canada: Croatia

Diplomatic mission
- Canadian Embassy, Zagreb: Croatian Embassy, Ottawa

Envoy
- Ambassador Jessica Blitt: Ambassador; Vice Skračić

The foreign, diplomatic, economic, and political relations between Croatia and the Canada were established on 14 April 1993, following the independence of Croatia. As one of the first countries to recognize Croatia in 1992, a large Croatian diaspora in Canada has developed since the 20th century. Croatia and Canada are close military allies, sharing joint membership in NATO and collaborating extensively through UN peacekeeping missions.

Relations are warm and friendly with routine alignment on foreign policy and strengthening bilateral trade. The two nations have strong connectivity through tourism, international sport, and immigration. They collaborate within the United Nations, OSCE, IMF, and World Trade Organization. Croatia has been an observer of the Francophonie since 2004, alongside Canada.

== History ==
The origins of bilateral history can be traced back to 16th century seafaring exploration between French Canadian and Croatian sailors. French explorer Jacques Cartier took two Croat sailors on his third voyage to modern-day Canada. The 20th century saw a large migration of Croatians across Canada, mostly in Ontario, Vancouver, and Montreal. The two modern nations formally established diplomatic relations following the independence of Croatia, on 14 April 1993. In 2009, the Canadian government lifted visa requirements for Croatian citizens after sustained intervention from the Croatian government.

Croatian prime minister Andrej Plenković became the first sitting prime minister to visit Canada, joining Canadian prime minister Mark Carney in June 2026 amid the 2026 FIFA World Cup to discuss bilateral relations.

== Military cooperation ==
Both the Croatian Armed Forces and Canadian Armed Forces are members of military alliance NATO. The Royal Canadian Navy docked HMCS Fredericton in Croatia during a voyage on the Adriatic Sea in 2018. Canada sent armed forces for UN peacekeeping mission UNPROFOR (1992–1995) in Croatia as well as in Bosnia and Herzegovina. The Canadian government facilitated commercial agreements for Croatian autonomous drone manufacturing, supporting a burgeoning defence industry in Croatia.

== Economic activity ==
The two nations shared $270 million (CAD 370 million) in annual bilateral trade in 2020. From 2025 to 2026, foreign trade surged 150% to eclipse $430 million, a nearly 500% increase over the prior decade. Croatia Airlines is a key consumer of Canadian aerospace materials. Both nations have been party to the Canada-EU Comprehensive Trade Agreement (CETA) since 2017. They signed a double taxation waiver treaty in 1999, which followed a foreign investment protection treaty in 1997.

== Diplomatic missions ==
- Canada has an embassy in Zagreb.
- Croatia has an embassy in Ottawa and a consulate-general in Mississauga.

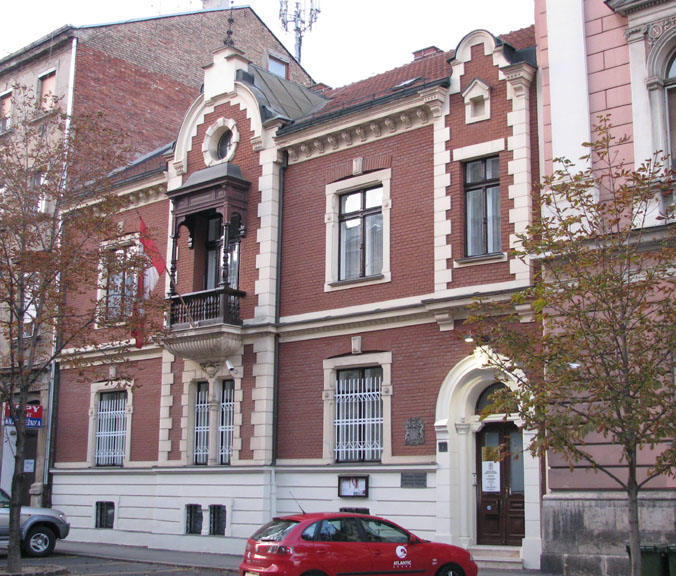
Embassy of Canada in Zagreb

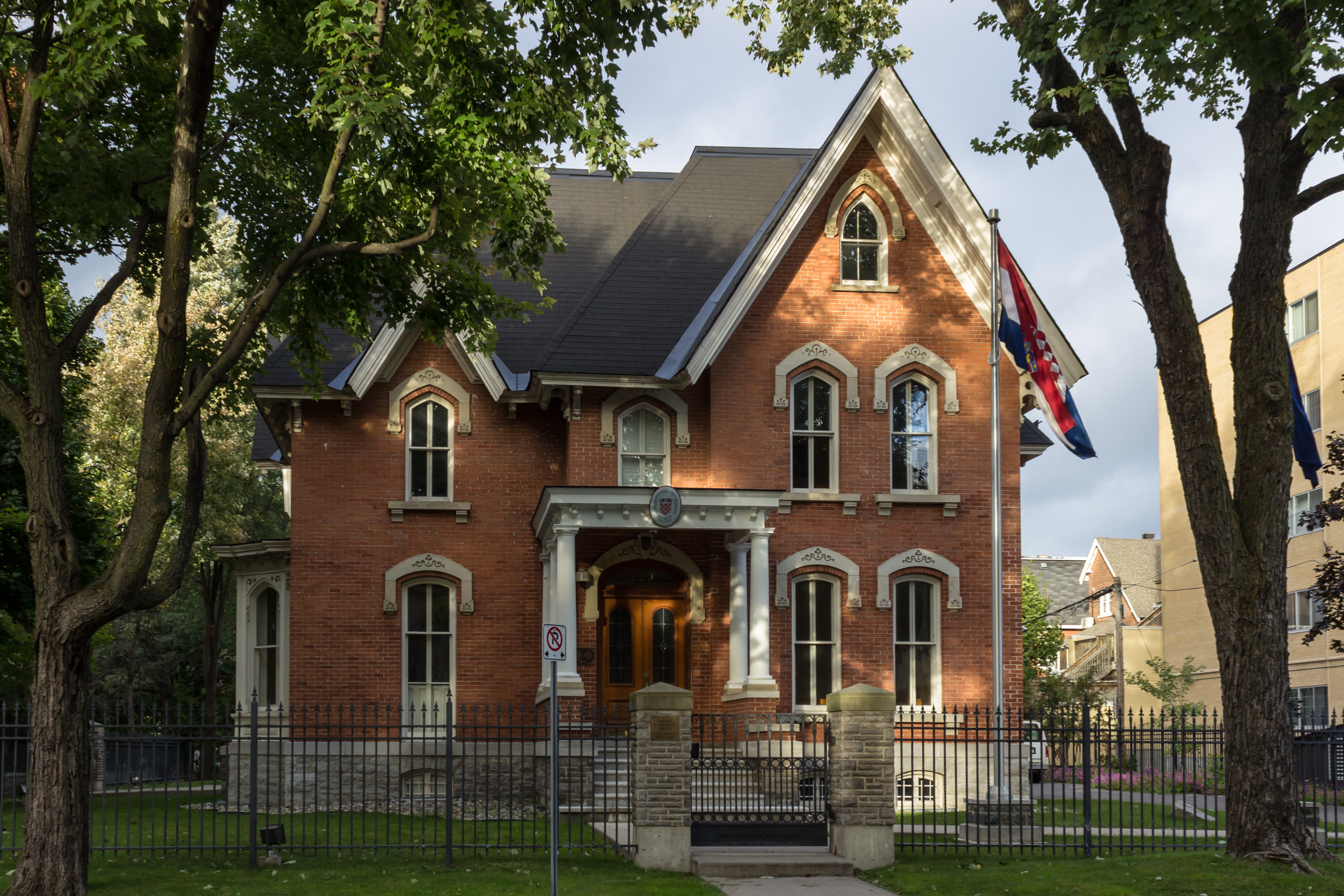
Embassy of Croatia in Ottawa

== See also ==
- Foreign relations of Canada
- Foreign relations of Croatia
- Canada–EU relations
- NATO–EU relations
- Croatian Canadians
