= Canada–Lithuania relations =

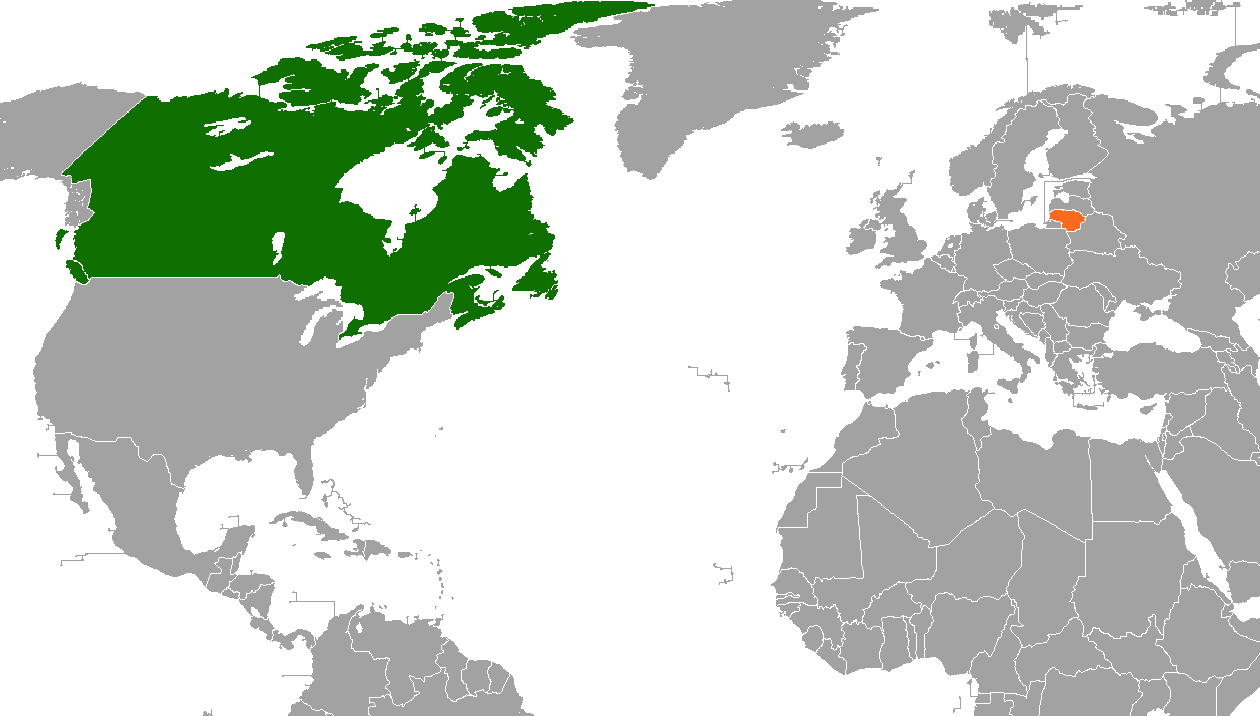

- Canada: Lithuania

Canada and Lithuania have long-standing foreign relations. Diplomatic relations were first established in 1937. Canada never recognized the annexation of Lithuania into the Soviet Union, and after Lithuania regained its independence in 1991, the two countries re-established diplomatic relations in 1991. Canada has an embassy in Vilnius, while Lithuania has an embassy in Ottawa. Both countries are full members of NATO and the Organization for Security and Co-operation in Europe.

== History ==
=== First contacts before 1918. ===
Although Europeans began colonizing Canada as early as 1497 (apart from the Viking expedition, which occurred even earlier), there is no record of colonists from the territories of the Grand Duchy of Lithuania until the 19th century, when Canada was one of the first territories of the British Empire to have dominion status.

Emigration from Lithuanian territory to Canada began at the end of the 19th century. In 1907 , a village was founded in Alberta, named Vilna in honor of Vilnius . The largest and oldest community was established in Montreal. A Lithuanian parish was established here in 1907, which became the center of the Lithuanian community. The first St. Casimir Lithuanian Church was built in 1915.The Lithuanians of Montreal are the largest Lithuanian community in French-speaking countries.

=== Relations 1918–1940 ===
The Lithuanian community in Canada was relatively small until the end of World War II (in 1921, there were 1,970 Canadians of Lithuanian origin, with another 5,000 immigrating between the wars.

Diplomatic relations between Canada and Lithuania were established in 1937. During World War II, Lithuania was at various times occupied by Nazi Germany and the Soviet Union. Canadian prisoners of war were among Allied POWs held by the Germans in the Stalag Luft VI POW camp in German-occupied Lithuania. After the establishment of diplomatic relations between the countries, a Lithuanian Consulate General was established in Toronto, and Lieutenant Colonel Gerald LP Grant-Suttie was appointed as the first honorary consul.

As Quebec tightened its requirements for the use of French, some Montreal Lithuanians began to move to Ontario.

=== Relations during the occupation of Lithuania ===
In 1944, Lithuania was forcibly annexed by the Soviet Union and Canada never recognized the annexation of Lithuania into the Soviet Union.

The majority of Lithuanian emigrants were deported to Canada as refugees after World War II, fleeing possible Soviet repression. In the winter and spring of 1947, Canadian immigration officials visited the displaced persons camps and announced that they would accept several tens of thousands of immigrants. Ultimately, Canada accepted a total of 157,687 refugees, of whom 20,000 were from Lithuania.

In Canada, throughout the Soviet occupation, a Consulate General operated in Toronto, where the Honorary Consul General of Lithuania was GLP Grant-Suttie. In 1949, V. Gylys was appointed to the same position. From 1959 to 1989, Consul General Dr. Jonas Žmuidzinas was the first Lithuanian to hold the post. In 1962, the appointment of the Lithuanian chargé d'affaires was recognized. Dr. Jonas Žmuidzinas was included in the Canadian government's official list of diplomats, the only Baltic diplomat to remain on the list until his death. In early 1990, Haris Lapas became the Honorary Consul General of Lithuania in Toronto. The Canadian government officially recognized the Honorary Consul General of Lithuania in November 1990.

Canada had declared its non-recognition of the annexation of the Baltic States several times. In 1947, the Canadian Minister of Foreign Affairs informed that the Canadian government had recognized that Estonia was de facto incorporated into the USSR, but did not recognize this fact de jure. However, there was no analogous statement regarding Latvia and Lithuania. In 1948, it was recalled that Canada had not recognized the incorporation of Lithuania into the USSR de jure, when on March 12, 1948, the USSR Embassy in Canada announced that residents of the Klaipėda region must register with the USSR consulates or embassy. On May 17, 1954, the representative of the Canadian government officially stated in parliament that there was no occasion for the Canadian government to consider it necessary to formally reaffirm or revoke the de jure recognition of the Baltic States. Also in 1975 and 1985, Canada had officially declared its non - recognition of the incorporation of the Baltic States into the USSR de jure.

=== Relations after 1991 ===
Canada recognized independence on August 26 1991, the first among North American states. In 1990, Lithuania obtained its independence after the Dissolution of the Soviet Union and Canada and Lithuania re-established diplomatic relations on 2 September 1991. In 2016, both nations marked the 25th anniversary of the re-establishment of diplomatic relations.

Both nations have signed bilateral agreements in 1997, 2006 and 2010.

In 1997, the NATO Partnership for Peace Program and a Memorandum of Understanding were signed between the Canadian Department of National Defence and the Lithuanian Ministry of National Defence, which remained in force until Lithuania's accession to NATO in 2004.

Canadian forces participated in the NATO Air Policing Mission in the Baltic States in 2014–2015. Canada also provided financial support to the NATO Energy Security Centre of Excellence in Vilnius.

== Bilateral agreements ==
Both nations have signed bilateral agreements such as an Agreement on the Avoidance of Double Taxation (1997); Agreement of Social Security Cooperation (2006) and an Agreement for Youth Mobility (2010).

== Trade ==
In 2016, trade between Canada and Lithuania totaled US$422.8 million. Canadian exports to Lithuania reached US$51.1 million, and included machinery, motor vehicles and parts, fish and seafood, and electrical machinery and equipment. Lithuanian exports to Canada reached US$371.7 million, and included mineral fuels and oils, furniture and bedding, scientific and technical instruments, and fertilizers.

== Migration ==
There is a large Canadian Lithuanian community (founded 1952) According to the 2006 census, 59,285 people of Lithuanian descent lived in Canada, including 1,785 Lithuanian citizens. The majority of Lithuanian-Canadians live in Ontario Province, where most of the Lithuanian-related heritage in Canada is located. Among the most famous Canadians of Lithuanian descent are Leonard Cohen, Birutė Galdikas, Ruta Lee, Arch Enemy vocalist Alissa White-Glu, Guinness World Records record holder polyglot Powell Janulus and others.

Meanwhile, in Lithuania 2022 At the beginning of 2021, 84 Canadian citizens lived in Lithuania.

== Resident diplomatic missions ==
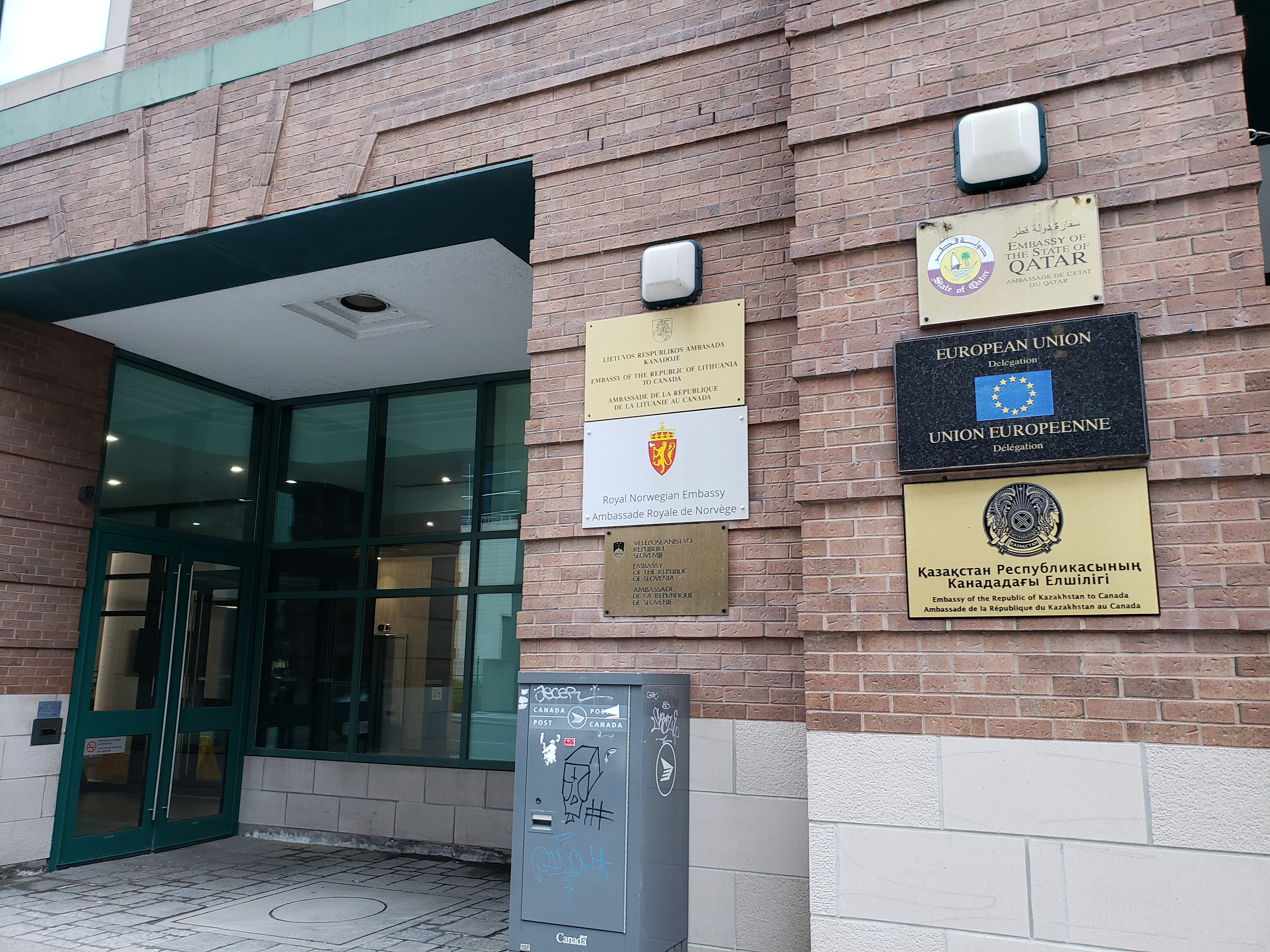
Embassy of Lithuania in Ottawa

- Canada has an embassy in Vilnius.
- Lithuania has an embassy in Ottawa.

== See also ==
- Foreign relations of Canada
- Foreign relations of Lithuania
- Canada-EU relations
- NATO-EU relations
- Lithuanian Canadians
