= Canada–Latvia relations =

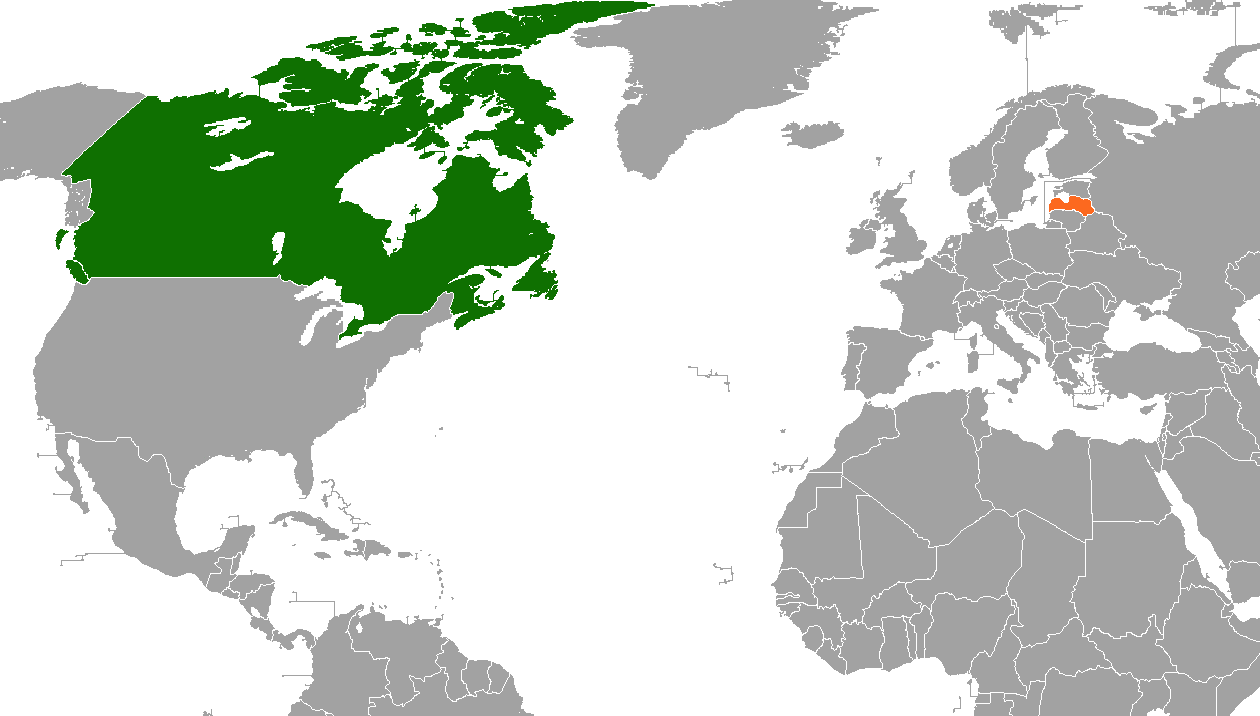

- Canada: Latvia

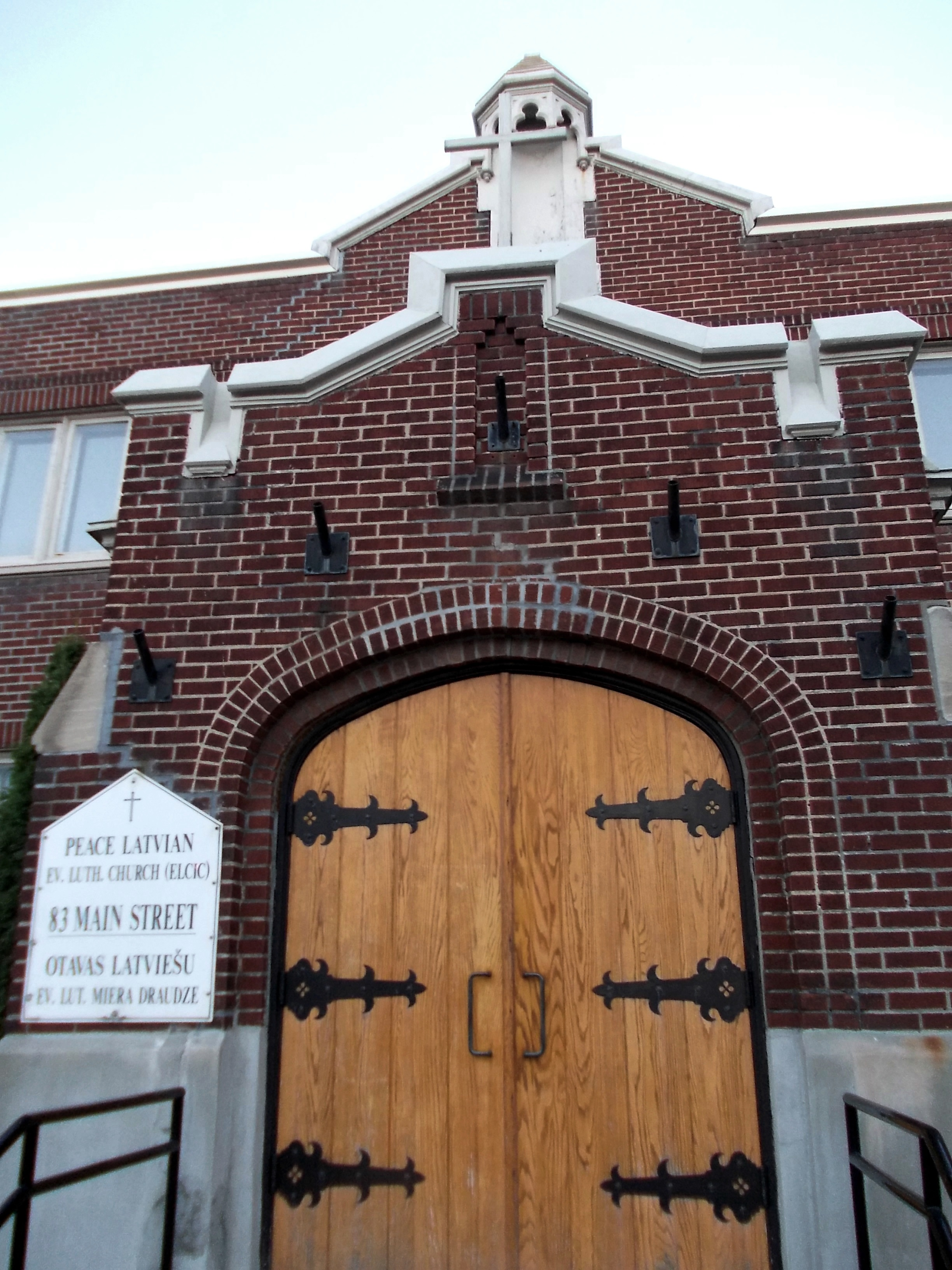
Peace Latvian Ev. Luth. Church (elcic) in Ottawa, Canada

Canada and Latvia have long-standing foreign relations. Canada never recognized the Soviet Union's annexation of Latvia and re-recognized Latvia's independence on August 26, 1991.

Both countries are full members of the OSCE and of NATO.

== Political relations ==
Canada never recognized the Soviet occupation of the Baltic States and was the first country of the G7 to recognize Latvia's Independence. On 28 March 2003, Canada was the first country to ratify Latvia's accession in NATO. The presence of a significant and active Latvian-Canadian community (estimated at 22,600) also underpins the bilateral relationship.

Under Operation Reassurance, Canada deploys about 2200 soldiers to Latvia.

== High level visits ==
=== High-level visits from Latvia to Canada ===
The Speaker of Latvian Parliament (Saeima) Gundars Daudze led a parliamentary delegation to Canada in May 2008.

On May 11-12, 2022 Prime Minister Krišjānis Kariņš travelled to Ottawa to meet with Prime Minister Justin Trudeau.

On July 6–7, 2024 President Edgars Rinkēvičs travelled to Toronto to attend the XVI Latvian Song and Dance Festival in Canada. President attended the Mass Choir Concert on July 6 and the Folk Dance Spectacle on July 7, as well as the Ecumenical Church service at St. John’s Church in Toronto.

=== High-level visits from Canada to Latvia ===
In November 2006, Canadian Prime Minister Stephen Harper travelled to Riga to attend NATO summit. Canadian Minister of International Trade Stockwell Day visited Latvia in May 2009. The Speaker of the Senate of Canada Noël A. Kinsella visited Latvia in January 2010.

In July 2018, Canadian Prime Minister Justin Trudeau travelled to Riga to meet Prime Minister Māris Kučinskis and President Raimonds Vējonis. Trudeau toured the Ādaži Military Base and met with members of the Canadian-led multinational NATO Enhanced Forward Presence battlegroup Latvia and the Canadian Armed Forces deployed on Operation REASSURANCE.

In March 2022, Canadian Prime Minister Justin Trudeau visited Latvia and met with Latvian Prime Minister Krišjānis Kariņš and President Egils Levits. The meeting reinforced Canada’s commitment to NATO in solidarity with European allies and partners in the face of the Russian invasion of Ukraine. The Prime Ministers of Canada, Latvia, and Spain, and the NATO Secretary General Jens Stoltenberg also visited with the troops of NATO’s enhanced Forward Presence Battle Group at Camp Ādaži in Latvia.

In July 2023, Trudeau travelled to Riga to meet with President Edgars Rinkēvičs.

In August 2025, Prime Minister Mark Carney travelled to Riga to meet with Prime Minister Evika Siliņa. He also met with Canadian troops stationed at Ādaži Military Camp and he announced an extension of Canada's military mission in Latvia to 2029. Canada currently has 2,200 soldiers in Latvia.

== Resident diplomatic missions ==
- Canada has an embassy in Riga.
- Latvia has an embassy in Ottawa.

== See also ==
- Foreign relations of Canada
- Foreign relations of Latvia
- Canada-EU relations
- NATO-EU relations
- Comprehensive Economic and Trade Agreement
- Latvian Canadians
