= Delegation of the European Union to Canada =

- Location: Ottawa, Ontario
- Address: 150 Metcalfe Street, Suite 1900
- Coordinates: 45.4214°N 75.6983°W

The Delegation of the European Union to Canada is located in Ottawa, Ontario, Canada. It was established to facilitate relations between the European Union and Canada. It opened in 1976 and was originally located at 45 O'Connor Street before moving to a new location at 150 Metcalfe Street.

Though not officially an embassy, the head of the mission is given rank and courtesy title of ambassador within Canadian law. The Delegation has three sections: Economic and Trade; Political and Public Affairs; and Administration.

== See also ==
- Canada–European Union relations
- Mission of Canada to the European Union
