= Embassy of the Czech Republic, Ottawa =

Diplomatic mission of Czechia to Canada

Embassy of Czech Republic in Ottawa
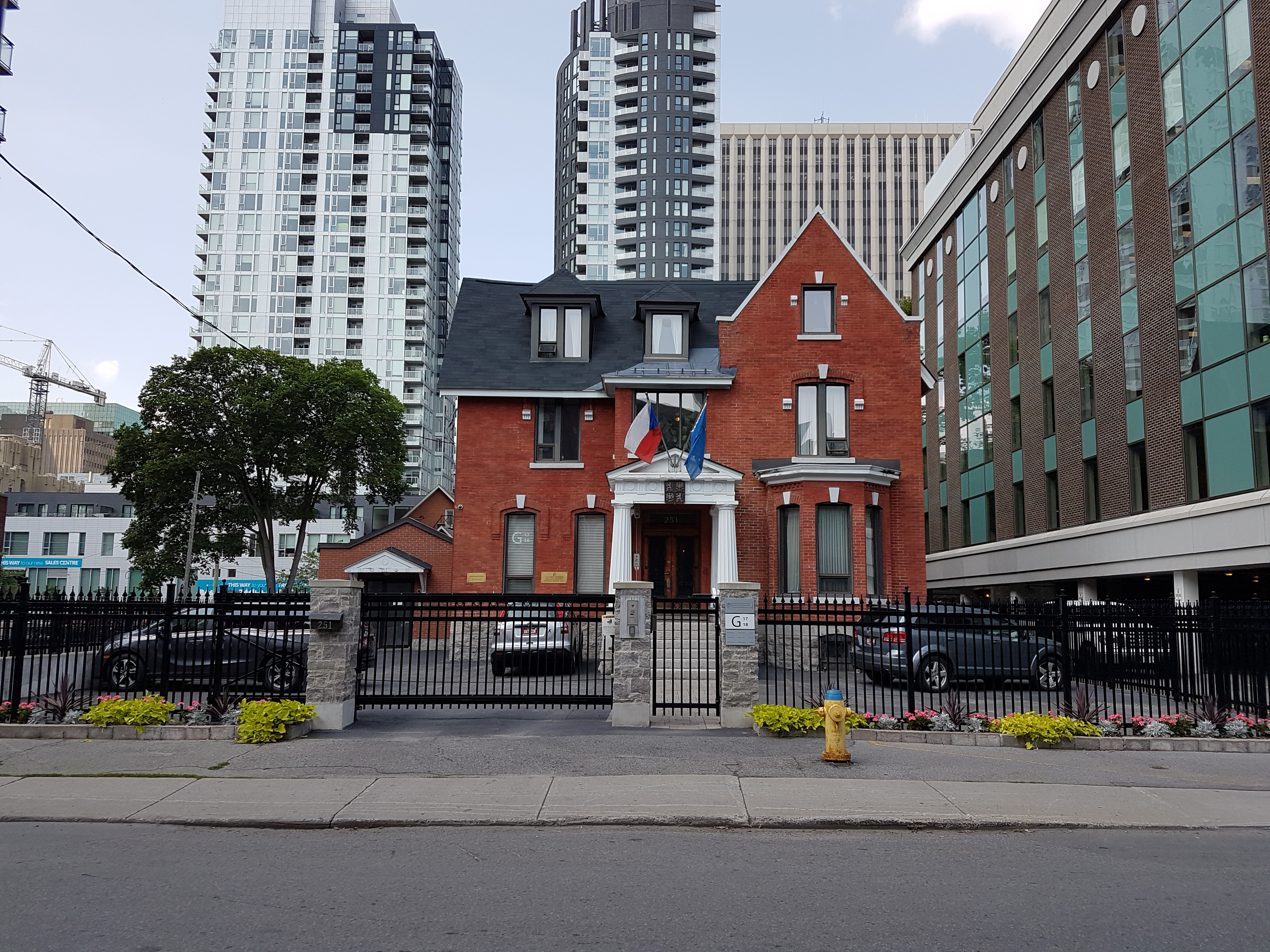
- Location: Ottawa
- Address: 251 Cooper Street
- Coordinates: 45.418226°N 75.692169°W
- Ambassador: Martin Tlapa

The Embassy of the Czech Republic in Ottawa is the Czech Republic's embassy in Canada. It is located at 251 Cooper Street in Ottawa, the Canadian capital. Martin Tlapa serves as Ambassador (as of October 2023).

The Czech Republic also has a consulate-general in Toronto.

== See also ==
- Canada–Czech Republic relations
- Foreign relations of Canada
- Foreign relations of Czech Republic
- Canada-EU relations
- NATO-EU relations
- Czech Canadians
