= Associate membership of the European Union =

Proposed political concep

The European Union and the surrounding geographical areas.

The Associate membership of the European Union is a proposed political concept—not an established legal status in the Treaties of the European Union—for deep cooperation between the European Union (EU) and a non-member country short of full membership. Moreover, the EU associate membership does not currently exist and the process to create it could take years. Since it doesn't exist in the EU treaties, its legal and institutional shape remains unclear. Therefore, the EU would need to establish the legal framework for “associate membership” from scratch, defining both parties’ rights and obligations. If the EU associate status were enshrined in EU treaties, it would require unanimity and ratification among all 27 EU member states. Therefore, it could lead to major challenges including aligning partners' regulations and securing unanimous approval from all 27 EU member states.

== Countries that received the proposal for Associate membership of the European Union ==
In September 2023, France and Germany proposed a restructuring of the membership of the EU to allow the United Kingdom to rejoin as an associate member, rather than a full member. Associate membership of the European Union would include membership of the European single market but not the EU customs union, in exchange for participation in the European Court of Justice and making contributions to the EU budget. The president of the European Commission, Ursula von der Leyen, expressed her support for the United Kingdom eventually rejoining the EU.

In May 2026, Germany had proposed Ukraine to become associate member of the European Union German Chancellor Friedrich Merz floated the idea in May 2026 of an “associate membership” for Ukraine. In a letter sent to EU leaders, he argued that this status would grant Ukraine access to the decision-making bodies – the European Council, the European Commission and the European Parliament – without voting rights or a dedicated portfolio. It would also allow the country to tap into certain EU-funded programmes on a "step-by-step" basis. The German Chancellor Friedrich Merz also floated the idea to include countries like Moldova.

On 16 September 2026, during the State of the Union address to the European Parliament in Strasbourg, France, the president of the European Commission Ursula von der Leyen formally invited Canada to become the EU's first-ever “associate member”.

On 17 September 2026, President of the European Parliament Roberta Metsola stated that Australia and New Zealand could follow Canada into associated EU membership.

== See also ==
- Potential enlargement of the European Union
- Canada–European Union relations
- Ukraine–European Union relations
- Moldova–European Union relations
- Australia–European Union relations
- New Zealand–European Union relations
- United Kingdom–European Union relations
