= Canada–European Union relations =

- European Union: Canada

Diplomatic mission
- European Union Delegation, Ottawa: Mission of Canada, Brussels

Envoy
- Ambassador Geneviève Tuts: Ambassador Jonathan Wilkinson

Relations between Canada and the European Union (EU), and its predecessors, date back to the 1950s. Since then, they have grown from a primarily economic relationship, into a partnership including cooperation on trade, foreign policy, security, defence, energy, and science. The EU has described Canada as "global strategic partner" and a "trusted partner for Europe", and the EU is Canada's second-largest trading partner. While the relations were historically less important than Canada's ties with the United States and the United Kingdom, they have deepened from the 1970s onwards and expanded further since the 1990s. This led to the Canada-EU Free Trade Agreement, which has been provisionally applied since 2017 and is among the most far-reaching free trade agreements the EU has concluded with a third country. That same year, the Strategic Partnership Agreement, which broadened cooperation to include human rights, security, sustainable development, and justice, entered into force. Security and defence cooperation has become more important since the 2020s: Canada has participated in EU crisis-management missions, the Permanent Structured Cooperation, and the SAFE defence-procurement initiative as the first non-European country to do so. The two sides have also expanded cooperation on energy, climate, and research, including Canada's associate membership in the EU's Horizon Europe programme.

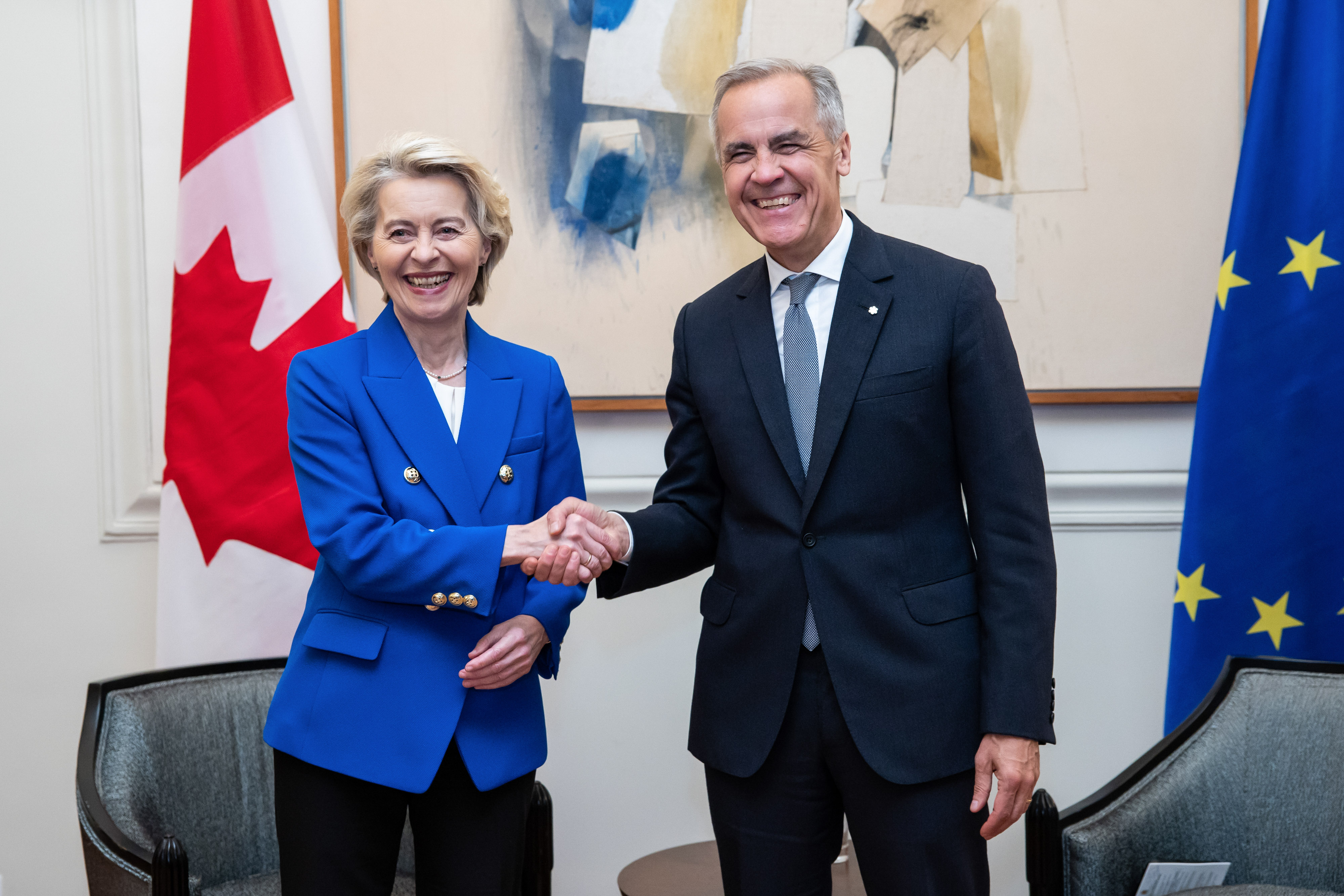
Canadian Prime Minister Mark Carney with President of the European Commission Ursula von der Leyen in Rome, 2025

Amid global geopolitical tensions of the 2020s, the trade war between the US and Canada, as well as US threats to annex Canada, discussions about a potential Canadian accession to the European Union have emerged. This idea has seen growing public support in opinion polling. However, current leadership on both sides have rejected the prospects of full membership. Instead, in September 2026, European Commission President Ursula von der Leyen invited Canada to work together "on opening the door for [it to become] the first associate member" of the EU. Canadian Prime Minister Mark Carney welcomed this idea. Because the "associate membership" category does not officially exist under the EU treaties, it would first need to be legally defined and then ratified by all EU member states. Some political observers have interpreted the "associate membership" label as another term for much deeper cooperation without an actual intent to pursue the creation of any new official legal membership status. Areas that might be covered by such an alliance in the future could include cooperation on economic security, energy security, advanced manufacturing, critical minerals, defence production, AI and information technology, quantum computing, batteries, payments, the Arctic, space exploration, research, as well as easier mobility for workers and students, including Canadian membership in the Erasmus programme. However, as of 2026, talks regarding the specific framework of such closer ties are still at an early stage.

== History ==
=== Background ===
Canada's relationship with Europe is a result of the historical connections generated by colonialism and mass European immigration to Canada. In the Middle Ages, Canada was first colonized by Vikings on the shores of Baffin Island, along with those of Newfoundland and Labrador. However, centuries later in the Modern Age, it would be mainly colonized by France and, after 1763, it formally joined the British Empire after its conquest in the Seven Years' War. In addition, it also had colonial influence from Spain in British Columbia, as well as southern Alberta and Saskatchewan. As a consequence, today, many Canadians are native English and French speakers; both being European languages. In addition, several local provincial and federal government offices of Canada practice official bilingualism in these working languages.

Historically, Canada's relations with the UK and the United States were usually given priority over relations with continental Europe. Nevertheless, Canada had existing ties with European countries through the Western alliance during the Second World War, the United Nations, and NATO before the creation of the European Economic Community.

=== 1958–1980s: Early relations ===
Visit of President of the European Commission Jean Rey to Canada (Montreal, 1967)

Relations between Canada and the European integration project began shortly after the creation of the European Economic Community (EEC), the predecessor of the European Union. In 1958, Canada became the first non-member state to appoint an ambassador to the EEC. The following year, Canada and the Euratom signed the Agreement for Cooperation in the Peaceful Uses of Atomic Energy.

During the 1960s, Canada's trade and diplomatic relations remained primarily focused on the United States, while economic relations with the six-member European Community were comparatively limited.

The relationship became more important in the early 1970s when Canadian politicians wanted to diversify the country's economic ties following economic disruptions in the United States as well as their neighbor's introduction of a 10% import tariff. As a response, Canadian Prime Minister Pierre Trudeau started moving towards a "Third Option" foreign policy by pledging to diversify trade and to strengthen ties with the European Economic Community. The accession of the United Kingdom to the European Communities in 1973 further increased Canadian interest in strengthening its relations with Europe. In fact, more structured Canada–European Communities dialogue, including informal “semi-annual” or “high-level” meetings had already begun as early as 1972, though they were not consistently held twice per year. Many of the so-called “high-level” meetings were in practice conducted at the level of assistant deputy minister for Canada and deputy director-general of the European Commission. Efforts to negotiate preferential trade arrangements, however, were complicated by concerns among some European leaders regarding Canada's close economic integration with the United States. Since 1974, members of the Canadian Parliament and the European Parliament have met regularly.

Bilateral cooperation on the environment dates back to an exchange of letters in 1975, which identified areas of common interest and established a framework for periodic high-level consultations to review progress. High-level meetings under this framework have been held regularly since 1983. The European Commission established a diplomatic presence to Canada in 1976. In July of that year, the European Communities and Canada signed the Framework Agreement on Economic Co-operation, the first formal agreement of its kind between the European Communities and an industrialized third country. In this agreement both sides committed to expanding and diversifying their bilateral trade, and created the Joint Cooperation Committee that convenes at least annually as the primary common institutional body for overseeing implementation and further cooperation. However, this link did not lead to a wide area of specific programs of cooperation, but instead "withered away through mutual neglect". In 1979 Canada became a cooperating state of the European Space Agency. Despite general further approachment between the two allies during the 1970s, results remained relatively limited.

Canadian Prime Minister Brian Mulroney (right) welcomed by President of the European Commission Jacques Delors (centre) and European Commissioner for External Relations and Trade Willy De Clercq (left) in Brussels, 1988

During the 1980s, cooperation remained steady but largely incremental, characterized by a “piecemeal approach” in which numerous small sectoral agreements were concluded alongside collaboration in multilateral institutions. In 1981, Canada and the EEC signed a Long-Term Fisheries Agreement to manage access to fish stocks and promote sustainable practices. Initiatives of the 1970s aiming for closer ties between Canada and the European Communities stalled after conservative Prime Minister Brian Mulroney took office following the 1984 Canadian federal election. Instead, the focus shifted towards negotiations with U.S. President Ronald Reagan that would ultimately lead to the Canada–United States Free Trade Agreement in 1988 and the creation of the North American Free Trade Agreement in 1994, which increased Canadian dependence on the US. This move faced domestic Canadian opposition from critics concerned about American hegemony, with some protestors wearing pins stating "51st state: Mulroney for Governor". Due to the creation of the European single market, in the late 1980s and the 1990s Canadian companies started to increasingly invest in Europe to prevent being excluded from that market, which was considered a protectionist "Fortress Europe".

=== 1990s–2000s: Expansion of cooperation ===
With the end of the Cold War the idea of multilateralism gained in popularity. Thus, Canada and the European Communities expanded their cooperation beyond economic matters to also include foreign policy and international security issues. In 1990, European and Canadian leaders adopted a "Declaration on Transatlantic Relations", which established regular meetings at Summit and Ministerial level. However, the declaration itself remained vague regarding details of further cooperation.

Canadian Prime Minister Jean Chrétien (left) and President of the European Commission Jacques Delors (right) in Brussels, 1994

In 1992, an international arbitral tribunal resolved a long-standing maritime boundary dispute between Canada and France regarding the exclusive economic zone surrounding Saint Pierre and Miquelon. In the mid-1990s, disputes between Canada and EU member states, especially Spain and Portugal, over North Atlantic turbot fishing escalated into the so-called Turbot War. Allegations of overfishing and quota violations led Canada to take strong actions, including firing warning shots at, and seizing Spanish vessels in international waters using patrol vessels. The confrontation ended with an agreement that favored Canada’s conservation goals, but it had a temporary negative impact on diplomatic relations with Spain and the EU.

At the 1996 Ottawa Summit, both sides adopted a Joint Political Declaration and Action Plan that identified new areas for cooperation. While the objective was to strengthen bilateral relations and the declaration touched upon areas like trade policy, environment, investment, competition, labor standards, and intellectual property rights, it did not include many details yet. Nonetheless, from then onwards Canada increasingly prioritised the EU in its foreign policy. This rapprochement included the 1996 Agreement on Scientific and Technical Cooperation, as well as agreements on customs cooperation and on sanitary measures for the protection of human and animal health in trade that were concluded in 1998. In 1999, both sides signed an agreement on the application of competition laws.

In 1999, leading business representatives established the Canada Europe Roundtable for Business (CERT), which became an important advocate of deeper economic integration and a comprehensive free trade agreement between Canada and the EU.

Since 2003, Canada has participated in 13 civilian and military missions of the EU's Common Security and Defence Policy (CSDP). Further sectoral cooperation followed in 2004 with an agreement on trade in alcoholic beverages, alongside the broader EU–Canada Partnership Agenda, which included provisions regarding the negotiation of a "trade and investment enhancement agreement" and the development of a "voluntary framework for regulatory cooperation". In 2005, both parties concluded an agreement establishing a framework for Canada’s participation in EU crisis management operations. The Agreement on civil aviation safety was signed in 2009.

=== 2010s–2020s: Strategic partnership ===
Canadian Prime Minister Stephen Harper (left) and President of the European Commission José Manuel Barroso (right) shaking hands at the 2007 EU-Canada Summit in Berlin

In previous decades, different proposals for a Canada-EU free trade agreement (FTA) did not come to fruition, which was mostly due to hesitancy from the EU. However, after broader WTO international trade negotiations began to stall with the Doha Round, in 2006 the EU opened the doors to bilateral FTAs with the publication of its Global Europe policy document. In January 2007, Premier of Quebec Jean Charest called for an FTA with the EU. Shortly after, the Canadian government also began advocating for negotiations of a Canada–European Union free trade agreement. This led to the 2007 EU-Canada Summit in Berlin where the highest-level leaders of the EU and Canada met in-person for the first time since 2005. A joint study on the impact of further trade was published by the Canadian government and the European Commission in 2008. Following the May 2009 EU-Canada Summit in Prague, which called for a "comprehensive economic partnership agreement", formal negotiations were launched in June 2009.

On 30 October 2016, the "Strategic Partnership Agreement between the EU and its Member States, of the one part, and Canada, of the other part" was signed in Brussels. This agreement seeks to deepen political dialogue and cooperation between the EU and Canada and to strengthen relations in fields such as human rights, international peace and security, economic and sustainable development, justice, freedom and security. The agreement provisionally entered into force on 1 April 2017. After intense negotiations, the Comprehensive Economic and Trade Agreement (CETA) that has been applied since 2017 and is possibly the farthest-reaching free trade agreement between the EU and a third country, was concluded.

Geopolitical developments of the 2020s led to further strengthening of bilateral ties. In 2021, Canada became a third-state participant in the EU's Permanent Structured Cooperation (PESCO). In light of the Russian invasion of Ukraine, in June 2022, Canada and Denmark peacefully resolved their long-running "Whisky War" by signing an agreement to split Hans Island, thus establishing the first land border between Canada and an EU member state. Canada also strengthened its participation in European research initiatives by becoming an associated member of Horizon Europe in 2024.

President of the European Commission Ursula von der Leyen (left), Canadian Prime Minister Mark Carney (centre), and President of the European Council António Costa (right) at the 2025 EU-Canada Summit in Brussels

After becoming Canadian Prime Minister in March 2025, Mark Carney broke the tradition of first visiting the US, by instead opting for France, an EU member state, for his first foreign visit. This decision was seen as a reaction to US threats to annex Canada and as a way to forge stronger relationships with Europe. In June 2025, Canada and the EU signed a Security and Defence Partnership to expand cooperation in areas such as defence industrial cooperation and participation in European defence initiatives like SAFE, the EU's joint procurement initiative, that it joined in 2026. In October 2025, Carney appointed diplomat John Hannaford as Canada's special prime ministerial envoy to the EU. However, the European Commission did not appoint a counterpart, Dutch civil servant Joost Korte, until two months later. According to European and Canadian officials, this delay was due to the fact that several European leaders, including Italian Prime Minister Giorgia Meloni and British Prime Minister Keir Starmer, expressed concern about measures that could provoke the United States.

In March 2026, the European Parliament adopted a report calling for deeper EU-Canada cooperation to tackle security threats and boost trade amid rising geopolitical threats. Although not directly related to the EU, Canada joined the European Broadcasting Union as a full member in June 2026, and is thus set to participate in the Eurovision Song Contest for the first time in 2027. In September 2026, Prime Minister Mark Carney said Canada was pursuing a "unique alliance" with the European Union, while ruling out full EU membership. Discussions reportedly included reducing trade barriers, while improving infrastructure and cooperation, and potentially allowing Canadians to live and work in the EU without visas. Shortly after, the European Parliament announced that it would open an official representation in Ottawa, the Canadian capital, to strengthen ties with Canada. Later that month, European Commission President Ursula von der Leyen and Canadian Prime Minister Mark Carney announced the idea of working "on opening the door for [Canada to become] the first associate member".

== Comparisons ==
	European Union	Canada
Population	450,646,971	41,472,081
Area	4,225,104 km^{2} (1,631,322 sq mi)	9,984,670 km^{2} (3,855,100 sq mi)
Population Density	106.7/km^{2} (276.4/sq mi)	4.2/km^{2} (10.9/sq mi)
Capital	Brussels (de facto)	Ottawa
Global cities	Paris, Milan, Frankfurt, Madrid, Warsaw, Amsterdam	Toronto, Montreal, Vancouver, Calgary
Government	Supranational parliamentary democracy based on the European treaties	Federal parliamentary democratic constitutional monarchy
First Leader	High Authority President Jean Monnet	Prime Minister John Alexander Macdonald
Current Leader	Parliament President Roberta Metsola; Council President António Costa; Commission President Ursula von der Leyen	King Charles III; Prime Minister Mark Carney
Official languages	24 official languages	English and French (see Official Languages Act 1969)
Main religions	66.2% Christianity (45.3% Roman Catholicism, 10% Eastern Orthodoxy, 8.3% Protestantism, 2.6% Other Christianity), 25.4% non-Religious, 5.6% Other religion, 1.4% Islam	67.3% Christianity, 23.9% Unaffiliated, 3.2% Islam, 1.5% Hinduism, 1.4% Sikhism, 1.1% Buddhism, 1.0% Judaism
Ethnic groups	Germans (ca. 80 million), French (ca. 67 million), Italians (ca. 60 million), Spanish (ca. 47 million), Poles (ca. 46 million), Romanians (ca. 18 million), Dutch (ca. 13 million), Greeks (ca. 11 million), Portuguese (ca. 11 million), and others	74.3% European; 14.5% Asian; 5.1% Indigenous; 3.4% Caribbean and Latin American; 2.9% African; 0.2% Oceanian
GDP (nominal, US$)	$21.230 trillion, $47,090 per capita (2025)	$2.320 trillion, $55,760 per capita (2025)

== Cooperation ==
=== Economy ===
The EU is Canada's second-largest trading partner. By 2026, trade in goods had increased by 76% and trade in services by 97% since the provisional application of the Canada-EU Free Trade Agreement in 2017. More specifically, that same year, around 90% of trade between the two was tariff-free. Further, total trade had reached US$150 billion in 2025.

==== Canada–EU Free Trade Agreement ====
Since as early as June 2007, the Government of Canada led by Prime Minister Stephen Harper had been pressuring the EU and its member countries to negotiate a Canada-EU free trade agreement. Former French prime minister Edouard Balladur supported the idea, while former Canadian trade negotiator Michael Hart called the idea "silly." The Canada Europe Roundtable for Business (CERT), founded in 1999, had been a principal advocate for a free trade agreement supported by more than 100 Canadian and European chief executives. CERT was co-chaired by former Canadian trade minister Roy MacLaren and former editor of The Economist magazine Bill Emmott.

In June 2009, EU Trade Commissioner Catherine Ashton and Canadian Minister of International Trade Stockwell Day released a joint statement regarding the start of negotiations for a Comprehensive Economic and Trade Agreement (CETA). Minister Day stated "This first meeting represents a solid step toward a historic economic agreement between Canada and Europe. These negotiations are a priority for our government."

CETA has been provisionally applied since September 2017, thus removing 98% of the preexisting tariffs between the two sides. As of August 2023, seventeen EU states have deposited their instruments of ratification, while ten ratifications are still missing.

==== Digital Trade Agreement ====
Since March 2026, negotiations on a Digital Trade Agreement (DTA) to complement CETA have been ongoing. The proposed agreement would improve legal certainty for businesses engaged in digital commerce, strengthen consumer protection and privacy, and facilitate electronic transactions. The scope would likely include economic areas such as "telecommunication services, computer and information services, and other services that are typically delivered digitally". In September 2026, EU Trade Commissioner Šefčovič said that the agreement might be signed before the end of the year.

=== Defence ===
Since 2003, Canada has participated in 13 civilian and military missions conducted under the European Union's Common Security and Defence Policy (CSDP), making it one of the EU's most frequent third-country contributors to CSDP operations.

In 2021, Canada became a third-state participant in the EUs Permanent Structured Cooperation (PESCO) framework. In November of that year, Canada concluded an administrative arrangement with the European Union to participate in the PESCO Military Mobility project alongside 25 EU member states. In February 2023, Canada's participation in the Network of Logistic Hubs in Europe and Support to Operations (NetLogHubs) project was approved.

In June 2025, Canada and the EU signed a Security and Defence Partnership that will increase Canada's participation in SAFE, the EU's joint arms procurement initiative. The Security and Defense Partnership expands cooperation between Canada and the EU in areas such as support to Ukraine, security, and climate change. In December 2025, EU member states endorsed Canada's participation in SAFE, and in February 2026, the Council of the EU adopted a decision authorizing the EU to sign on to Canada's participation in SAFE, making Canada the first non-European country to participate in the SAFE Instrument.

=== Energy and environment ===
Both, Canada and the EU, want to achieve climate neutrality by 2050. In 2023, they held a summit in Newfoundland and established a framework for joint renewable energy development known as the Canada–European Union Green Alliance with stated goals to develop shared means for science and technology standards and cooperation as well as climate and environmental protection concerning their net-zero ambitions.

=== Science and research ===
Canada is a cooperating state of the European Space Agency since 1979. First official relations between Canada and the EU regarding research and innovations have existed since 1996 due to the Agreement on Cooperation in Scientific and Technological Cooperation. This has led to cooperation and regular discussions about respective or common research priorities. In 2019, Canada was proposed to join the EU's Horizon Europe scientific research initiative, becoming an Associated Member in 2024. The joint statement of the 2025 Canada-European Summit includes a commitment to expanding academic mobility and student recognition through Erasmus+, the European Research Council, and Marie Sklodowska-Curie actions.

=== Travel and mobility ===
Canadian passport holders are not required to obtain a visa for visits to the European Union's main Schengen area regarding stays of up to 90-days within any single 180-day span of time. European Union member states' passport holders may be allowed visits up to 180-days to Canada. Canadian passport holders will be required (starting in Q4 2026), to obtain an approved visa waiver through the European Travel Information and Authorization System (ETIAS); while EU passport holders need to similarly secure current Electronic Travel Authorization to negotiate their rights of travel to Canada.

Beyond tourism, due to CETA it is easier for certain business people to enter and stay temporarily. This covers key personnel (such as investors, intra-corporate company transferees, and business visitors for investment purposes), contractual service providers, independent professionals, and short-term business visitors. The maximum lengths of stay are predetermined, and work-permit exemptions or simplified processes are possible. An additional objective is the mutual recognition of certain professional qualifications.

== Potential EU membership ==
=== Legal considerations ===
Article 49 of the Treaty on European Union (TEU) states that any European country that respects the principles of the EU may apply to join. While Canada is geographically located in North America, the EU has stated that the interpretation of this criterion is "subject to political assessment" based on additional factors such as culture or political terms, by the Commission and the European Council. Example for these interpretations subject to political assessment of the Commission and the European Council is Turkey with its European part that accounts for only 3 percent of its entire territory. Cyprus, an EU member state, is geographically located entirely in Asia, despite its political and sociocultural ties with Europe.

European Commission President Ursula von der Leyen proposed a new "associate membership" status for Canada in September 2026. However, no provisions for this status exists in the EU treaties. Legally formalizing this category of membership would require an amendment to the treaties, which would need unanimity among all 27 EU member states, as well as domestic ratification by every member state. However, some political observers have interpreted the "associate membership" label as a possible term for much deeper cooperation without an actual intent to pursue the creation of any new official legal membership status. In line with that, such a closer alliance could be achieved by using Article 217 of the Treaty on the Functioning of the European Union (TFEU) which allows the EU to "conclude agreements" that "establish an association" with "one or more third countries or international organisations". Unlike Article 49 TEU which concerns the accession to the EU as a full member, Article 217 TFEU does not require a partner country to be a "European State". Based on 217 TFEU, Canada's status could sit somewhere between CETA and the European Economic Area (EEA), thus including deeper sector-specific cooperation just short of the EEA's broader single-market integration. However, while an Article 217 association can establish joint bodies with limited joint decision-making power, it cannot grant Canada any representation in the Council and the European Parliament.

=== Early proposals ===
In 2005, Der Spiegel summarized German editorialists under the title of "It's time for Canada to join the EU", in the context of Canada rejecting the American "Son of Star Wars" missile defense system initiative, and how joining the EU may decrease Canadian dependence on the United States regarding trade and security. In a 2006 article, Timothy Garton Ash noted how Canada would strengthen both the Francophone and the Anglophone bloc to the EU, and also easily meet the Copenhagen criteria for EU membership. In 2008, rabble.ca published an article about this in the context of easing Canada's reliance on the United States.

In 2017, the Mowat Centre published an article exploring the possibilities of Canada pursuing a unique status short of full membership in the EU, as a hedge against increasing American protectionism. This idea was further echoed in a 2018 commentary, originally published in The European Financial Review and republished by INSEAD, which argued that rising U.S. protectionist trade policies could incentivise deeper EU–Canada integration, including hypothetical scenarios of Canada joining the EU.

In early January 2025, The Economist revisited this concept by writing that complementarities between Canada and the EU as well as shifting geopolitical pressures could make Canadian membership of the EU a plausible strategic thought experiment.

=== Political discussions ===
==== EU membership ====
In the 2020s, the trade war between the United States and Canada, as well as the social impact of the COVID-19 pandemic, have opened a debate about the possibility of Canada's membership in the EU.

On 23 January 2025, following the second inauguration of Donald Trump, former German foreign minister Sigmar Gabriel proposed admitting Canada into the EU, emphasizing Europe's need to look for new allies in light of Trump's second term in office. Shortly thereafter, a trade war between United States and Canada heightened public discussion about Canada joining the EU. In early February 2025, former Belgian prime minister Guy Verhofstadt expressed support for Canada's membership into the EU, stating that "there is no reason why EU membership should be off the table".

In early March 2025, the European Movement International suggested to open a Canadian branch. One week later, reacting to positive poll results of Canadians wanting their country to join the EU, Chief Spokesperson for the European Commission Paula Pinho said she is "honoured with the results of such a poll". While not explicitly ruling out Canada's EU prospects, Pinho confirmed that Article 49 of the Treaty on European Union states that only "European states" can apply for EU membership and stressed that there are "criteria foreseen in the treaties, indeed, which foresee what is necessary for an application, for an accession to take place." Following Mark Carney's appointment as Canadian prime minister in late March 2025, his government began analysing different existing models of cooperation between the European Union and non-member European states, including the United Kingdom, Norway, Switzerland, and Georgia. Canadian officials identified 36 areas in which governments cooperate, including intelligence sharing and regulatory coordination, and assessed in which of these areas further cooperation between Canada and the EU would make sense.

In May 2025, German MEP Joachim Streit asked the Commission and the European Parliament for the possibility of Canada joining the EU. In response, Kaja Kallas, Vice-President of the European Commission, stated that while Canada and the EU have extensive historical, cultural, political and economic links, Canada does not qualify as a 'European' state as defined by Article 49 in the Treaty on European Union, nor are there any plans to revise the Treaties or to assess the benefits and possible consequences of Canadian accession to the EU.

At the June 2025 The Hague NATO summit, Canadian Prime Minister Mark Carney stated he would not aim for Canada to join the EU, though he would support closer ties between the two.

In March 2026, French Foreign Minister Jean-Noël Barrot and Finnish President Alexander Stubb both mulled the idea of Canada one day joining the EU, with Stubb calling it "a marriage made in heaven." In the same month, former Alberta Deputy Premier Thomas Lukaszuk has also floated the idea of Canada joining the EU.

In April 2026, European Commissioner for Enlargement Marta Kos stated that Canada does not meet the "European state" requirement of Article 49 of the Treaty on European Union. Instead, she suggested that "special partnership agreements" with close allies could be considered. In the same month, former Canadian Minister of Foreign Affairs and former Ambassador to France and the EU, Stéphane Dion, argued that Canada should strengthen its political and economic relationship with the EU, while rejecting EU accession. He argued that Canada's historical ties to Europe and shared political values made the EU a crucial strategic and economic partner, while emphasizing that it could not replace the US as Canada's main economic and security partner. He further stated that EU membership would entail too significant transfers of sovereignty and constitutional complications arising from Canada's federal structure. Instead, Dion proposed that Canada should join the European Political Community. Additionally, he called for the full implementation of existing Canada–EU agreements, including the Comprehensive Economic and Trade Agreement (CETA).

While attending the 8^{th} European Political Community summit in May 2026, Canadian Prime Minister Mark Carney described Canada as the "most European of non-European countries". In late May 2026, Swedish prime minister Ulf Kristersson joked that there may be a place for Canada in the EU, calling Canada "the most Nordic country in the world outside the Nordics."

In June 2026, Finnish President Alexander Stubb proposed that the EU expand its membership to 40 countries and named Canada as a potential candidate to join. Reacting to Stubb's remarks, former Canadian Prime Minister Justin Trudeau dismissed the idea of Canada formally joining the EU, while stating that he used to joke that Canada should rather become the "28th country of the European Union than the 51st state of the United States". Further, he called for a deeper cooperation within existing frameworks, including making the most out of current free trade agreements, as well as closer bilateral ties with non-EU countries that share European values, including Switzerland, Norway, Iceland, and the UK.

In August 2026, following Canada's decision to walk away from trade talks with the US and Donald Trump's escalation of the US trade war with Canada, Mark Carney announced intense discussions with the EU to build a stronger and deeper economic and security partnership. That same month, former Portuguese Secretary of State for European Affairs Bruno Maçães expressed his support for Canadian accession to the EU and vowed to actively advocate for it.

In a meeting of EU foreign ministers in Dublin in early September 2026, Canadian foreign minister Anita Anand stated that Canadian membership of the EU "is not on the front burner right now", but supports closer Canadian alignment with the EU in key policy areas.

==== Associate EU membership ====
In September 2026, EU Ambassador to Canada Geneviève Tuts said that the bloc was crafting a new and "unique" partnership with Ottawa unlike anything that currently exists. A week later, The Wall Street Journal reported that Canadian Prime Minister Mark Carney had raised the idea of the EU creating a new membership category for Canada, which would see it become the first "associate member of the European Union". The goal is to bring Canada and the EU as close together as possible short of joining the bloc or its common market as a full member. Points of discussion have included energy (incl. export of Canadian fossil gas via the Northwest Passage), artificial intelligence, critical minerals, defence, joint digital infrastructure (submarine communications cable, data centres, cloud storage facilities, satellite networks, etc.), as well as education and research (incl. more extensive participation of Canada in Erasmus+). Allowing Canadians to live and work in Europe visa-free has also been proposed in discussions with French President Emmanuel Macron. Canadian leader of the opposition Conservative Party, Pierre Poilievre, reacted by rejecting the idea of Canadian EU membership and calling such considerations "out of touch". Other conservative Canadian politicians shared similar concerns. As a response, Canadian Prime Minister Carney excluded the idea of full membership to the EU.

Canadian Prime Minister Mark Carney and President of the European Commission Ursula von der Leyen during the State of the European Union, 16 September 2026

On September 16, 2026, in her State of the European Union address, European Commission President Ursula von der Leyen said the bloc wants to open the door for Canada to become its first "associate member" by bringing "the relationship [...] to the highest level possible" and further added that the proposal “is not directed against anyone else". That expanded partnership would cover advanced manufacturing, technology, defence production, the Arctic, energy, critical minerals, batteries, AI, quantum computing, cybersecurity and economic security. Canadian Prime Minister Mark Carney attended the debate as guest of honor, being the first foreign leader in history to do so. Meanwhile, U.S. President Donald Trump called the idea of an associate membership "laughable" and threatened the EU with "very serious tariffs or [a] stop of trading [...] on many things" should the plans entail "a bad intention" and be "a hostile act". As a response, France's Minister Delegate for European Affairs Benjamin Haddad stated that neither the US nor anyone else had the power to veto political or geopolitical choices of Europeans. A German government spokesperson expressed openness to "discuss new models of partnership" with Canada while questioning the "associate member" label.

One day later, Canadian Prime Minister Mark Carney addressed the European Parliament in a speech welcoming the proposal of "associate membership". His speech laid out that such an alliance should entail collaboration on critical minerals, energy security, defence industrial capacity, AI and information technology, space exploration, payments. Roberta Metsola, President of the European Parliament, suggested trade and Canadian membership in the Erasmus programme as avenues of deepened collaboration. It was met with a lot of applause and a standing ovation by almost all MEPs besides the far-right political group. Later that day, Carney explained that until now there had only been "informal discussions" and that the specific development of a deeper alliance with the EU was still to be developed, notably through many debates and votes in the Canadian parliament. At the same time, he once again ruled out any full membership of the EU. Further, Carney emphasized that no other country would decide with whom Canada can adopt international agreements. Spanish Prime Minister Pedro Sánchez reacted by posting an EU flag which included a red Canadian maple leaf. The same week, Mark Carney made the first official visit by a Canadian prime minister to Saint Pierre and Miquelon. This trip was done jointly with French President Emmanuel Macron who backed the proposal for Canada to become an "associate member" of the EU.

There was a summit held in Montreal that ended on the 30 October 2026.

=== Opinion polling ===
==== Canadian polling ====
In September 2026, 78% of Canadians thought that the Prime Minister should garner some form of agreement before entering a new alliance with the EU, with holding a vote in Parliament the most popular (50%), followed by holding a public referendum (21%) or calling an election (7%). Only 19% thought the government should be able to enter into such an agreement without doing any of the above.

(Associate*) Membership of Canada to the European Union
Date(s)	Question	Yes	No	Unsure	Sample	Pollster
* Sep 2026	Would you support Canada negotiating an “associate membership” arrangement with the EU?	79%	15%	6%	1,057	Nanos Research
Sep 2026	Should Canada consider initiating a formal process to join the EU?	53%	32%	15%	1,003	Research Co.
* Sep 2026	Do you support Canada becoming an Associate Member of the EU?	70%	18%	13%	1,533	Léger
Sep 2026	Would you support Canada joining the EU?	58%	21%	21%	1,302	Pollara
Sep 2026	Thinking about the potential consequences of EU membership, would you support Canada joining the EU?	50%	36%	14%	1,302	Pollara
Sep 2026	Would you support Canada becoming a member state of the EU?	49%	30%	21%	1,479	Abacus Data
Jun 2026	Should Canada consider initiating a formal process to join the EU?	50%	35%	15%	1,001	Research Co.
Mar/Apr 2026	Would you support Canada becoming a full member of the EU?	57%	31%	12%	1,099	Nanos Research
Feb 2026	Should Canada consider initiating a formal process to join the EU?	48%	34%	18%	1,001	Research Co.
Feb 2026	Would you support Canada becoming a member state of the EU?	48%	28%	24%	1,915	Abacus Data
May 2025	Should Canada consider initiating a formal process to join the EU?	46%	38%	16%	1,002	Research Co.
Apr 2025	Would you support Canada becoming part of the EU?	42%	33%	26%	988	YouGov
Feb 2025	Would you support if Canada becomes a member state of the EU?	46%	29%	25%	1,500	Abacus Data
Feb 2025	Should the Canadian government look into joining the EU as a member?	44%	34%	23%	1,500	Abacus Data

Support for (Associate*) Membership of Canada to the European Union - By Regions ("Yes")
Date(s)	Ontario	Quebec	British Columbia	Alberta	Manitoba	Saskatchewan	Atlantic Canada	Pollster
* Sep 2026	79%	84%	85%	70%			81%	Nanos Research
Sep 2026	53%	59%	48%	49%	51%		52%	Research Co.
* Sep 2026	71%	75%	73%	64%	49%		65%	Léger
Sep 2026	51%	55%	54%	37%	37%		42%	Abacus Data
Jun 2026	55%	53%	50%	42%	50%		37%	Research Co.
Mar/Apr 2026	60%	53%	62%	48%			61%	Nanos Research
Feb 2026	48%	49%	52%	43%	49%		44%	Research Co.
May 2025	49%	43%	45%	42%	46%		44%	Research Co.
Apr 2025	45%	38%	53%	36%			39%	YouGov

Support for (Associate*) Membership of Canada to the European Union - By Political Parties ("Yes")
Date(s)	Liberal	Conservative	Bloc Québécois	New Democratic	Pollster
Sep 2026	64%	42%	—	60%	Research Co.
Sep 2026	64%	33%	57%	56%	Abacus Data
Jun 2026	64%	44%	—	49%	Research Co.
Feb 2026	56%	44%	—	56%	Research Co.
May 2025	51%	45%	—	51%	Research Co.
Apr 2025	57%	28%	—	58%	YouGov

==== European Union polling ====
In April 2026, a majority or plurality of adults in the five largest EU member states (France, Germany, Italy, Poland, and Spain) supported Canada joining the EU.

To what extent, if at all, would you support or oppose Canada joining the European Union?
Date(s)	Member states	Support	Oppose	Don't know	Sample	Pollster
Apr 2026	Germany	55%	22%	23%	1,142	YouGov
Apr 2026	France	42%	29%	29%	1,022	YouGov
Apr 2026	Italy	41%	24%	34%	1,067	YouGov
Apr 2026	Spain	51%	20%	29%	1,117	YouGov
Apr 2026	Poland	46%	21%	32%	1,007	YouGov

=== Impact ===
Impact of Canada's Accession to the European Union
Countries	Population	Area (km^{2})	Population density	GDP (US$)	GDP per capita (US$)	Languages
Canada	41,472,081	9,984,670	4.2/km^{2}	2,320 billion	55,760	English, French
(European Union) EU27	450,646,971	4,225,104	106.7/km^{2}	21,230 billion	47,090	24
EU27+1	492,119,052	14,209,774	34.6/km^{2}	23,550 billion	47,854	24

== Public opinion ==
In February 2026, when asked about Canada's most important partner in the next 3 to 5 years, 52% of Canadians ranked the EU as their top partner, and when asked about deepening strategic cooperation with the EU, 74% of Canadians supported closer cooperation with the EU on foreign policy, defence, and economic priorities. A survey conducted from March to April 2026 found that 84% of respondents believe strengthening economic ties is the best path forward for relations between Canada and the EU. In June 2026, 76% of Canadians supported enhancing trade with the EU, while 12% opposed.

In September 2026, the EU was viewed positively by 71% of Canadians. When asked whether Canada should deepen strategic cooperation with the European Union on foreign policy, defence, and economic priorities, 80% of Canadians said yes. When Canadians are asked to think specifically about shared values, way of life, and outlook on the world, 56% said Canada has more in common with the countries of the European Union than it does with the United States, while another 20% of Canadians said Canada has about equally as much in common with both. The survey also found that 61% of Canadians believed a closer relationship with the EU would increase Canada's economic independence. However, that same month, only 25% said requiring Canada to align some laws, regulations, and standards with the EU would make them more likely to support closer relations.

== Areas of tension ==
=== Territorial disputes ===
Canada has had bilateral territorial disputes with EU member states, like the 1990s Turbot War and the Canada–France Maritime Boundary Case, as well as the territorial claims in the Arctic. Another past border dispute involved Canada and Denmark which had a disagreement over the ownership of Hans Island. This resulted in the so-called "Whisky War" which was resolved diplomatically in June 2022, in light of the Russian invasion of Ukraine, by splitting the island in two parts.

=== Integration ===
A potential area of discordance regarding future integration of both sides could involve reaching regulatory harmonization between the provinces and territories of Canada and the EU in sectors where sovereignty is seen as particularly important. Examples could be the EU's relatively developed personal data privacy or food safety regulations in comparison to those of North America. Another issue which could hamper integration between the two sides of the Atlantic could be that the EU might be careful in giving Canada any preferential treatment compared to members of the European Economic Area, because such a move could reduce the willingness of those countries to accept the obligations attached to their membership in the European single market.

=== Trade ===
Historically, but not limited to only Canada, there have been international trade tensions due to the EU's Common Agricultural Policy subsidies which increase the likelihood of export dumping and can also make access to the EU's own agrifood market more difficult. This effect has been reduced after negotiations during the Uruguay Round somewhat limited the external impact of these policies. Furthermore, the EU ban of beef treated with artificial growth hormones dating back to the 1980s has created some tensions because these more stringent standards limit access to the European market for Canadian farmers involved in this practice. In 2013, there was tension over the EU ban on the import of seal products for animal welfare reasons. This was thought to be a motivating factor in Canada's efforts to block the EU's efforts to join the Arctic Council.

=== Foreign policy ===
Previously, Canada and the EU had been at odds over Canada's visa requirement for the EU citizens of the EU member states of Romania and Bulgaria. While this partially influenced the CETA negotiations, the visa requirement for the EU citizens of Romania and Bulgaria were lifted in November 2017. Up until the withdrawal from the war in Afghanistan in 2021, a contentious point was Canadian request for more European troop participation on the ground.

== Geography and borders ==
Map of Canada (red), the European Union (dark blue), and EU Overseas Countries and Territories (light blue) centred around the Arctic

Two overseas territories of EU members (Greenland and Saint Pierre and Miquelon) lie adjacent to Canadian territorial waters, as well as a land border with the Kingdom of Denmark (via Greenland) on Hans Island.

Beyond these traditional borders and as a diplomatic reward resulting from close state cooperation through a bilateral treaty the state of Canada was bequeathed land at Vimy Ridge in perpetuity within the Republic of France in 1922 to honor fallen Canadian soldiers from World War I. Canada further purchased land jointly along with the local French town of Courseulles-sur-Mer at Juno Beach to protect a culturally sensitive memorial from private surrounding developments. Further land sites historically were gifted to the government of Canada in the Kingdom of Belgium.

== Summits ==
Since the 1990s, Canada and the EU have held regular summits on highest leaders' level. Article 17 of the 2016 Canada-EU Strategic Partnership Agreement states that "summits at leaders level" shall be held "on an annual basis or as mutually agreed".

Canada–European Union summits
#	Date	Country	City	Host Leader	Ref	Image
22	2027	TBA	TBA	TBA		
21	29–30 October 2026	Canada	Montreal	Prime Minister Mark Carney		
20	22–23 June 2025	Belgium	Brussels	European Council President António Costa		
19	23 November 2023	Canada	St. John's	Prime Minister Justin Trudeau		
18	14 June 2021	Belgium	Brussels	European Council President Charles Michel		
17	17-18 July 2019	Canada	Montreal	Prime Minister Justin Trudeau		
16	30 October 2016	Belgium	Brussels	European Council President Donald Tusk		
15	26 September 2014	Canada	Ottawa	Prime Minister Stephen Harper		

== Canada-EU member states relations ==
- Austria
- Belgium
- Bulgaria
- Croatia
- Cyprus
- Czech Republic
- Denmark
- Estonia
- Finland
- France
- Germany
- Greece
- Hungary
- (Republic of Ireland) Ireland
- Italy
- Latvia
- Lithuania
- Luxembourg
- Malta
- Netherlands
- Poland
- Portugal
- Romania
- Slovakia
- Slovenia
- Spain
- Sweden

== See also ==
- Canada–Europe relations
- Comprehensive Economic and Trade Agreement
- Delegation of the European Commission to Canada (Ottawa)
- Mission of Canada to the European Union (Brussels)
- European Canadians
- European Union–NATO relations
- Transatlantic relations
- Foreign relations of Canada
- Foreign relations of the European Union
- Australia–European Union relations
- New Zealand–European Union relations
- Japan–European Union relations
- South Korea–European Union relations
