= Canada–Italy relations =

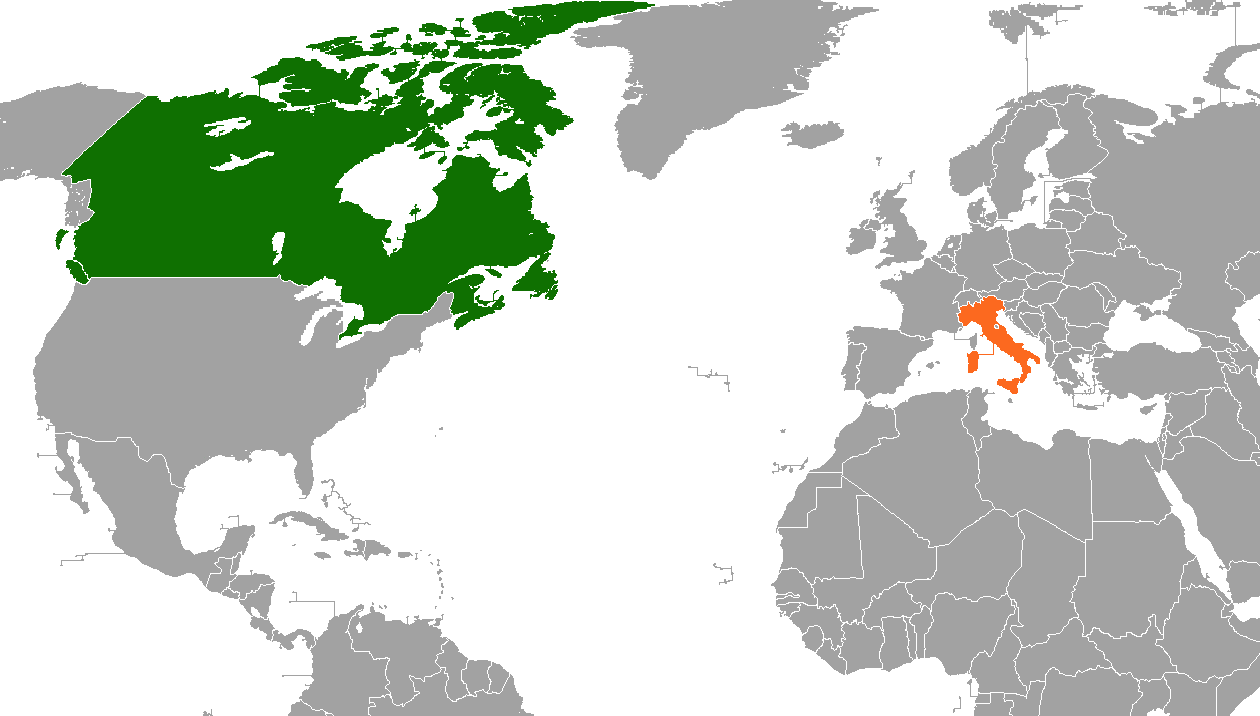

- Canada: Italy

Canada and Italy enjoy friendly relations and are close allies and partners through their membership in the G7, G20, NATO and the Organisation for Economic Co-operation and Development. Relations also centre on the history of Italian migration to Canada; approximately 1.5 million Canadians claim to have Italian ancestry (approximately 4.6% of the population).

== History ==
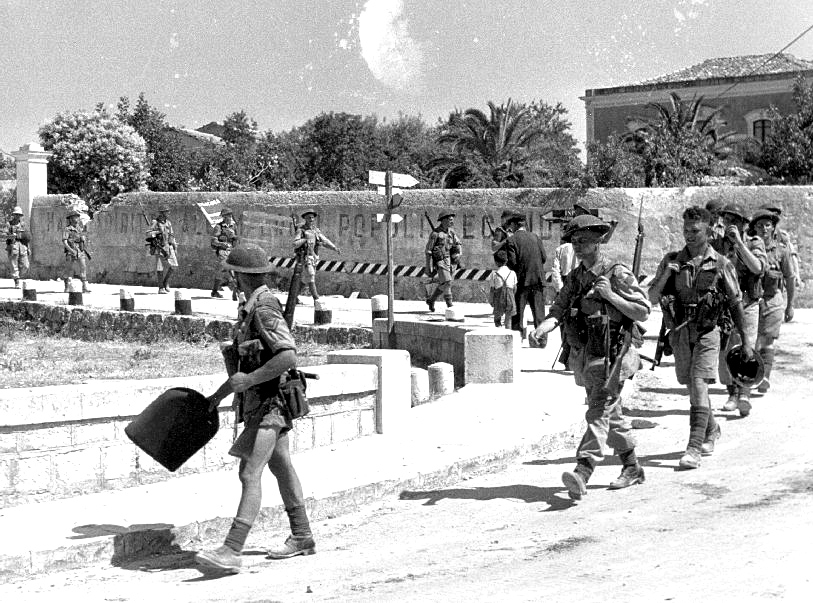
Canadian soldiers marching in Modica, Sicily during World War II

The first Italian to arrive to Canada was explorer Giovanni Caboto, a navigator from Venice, who explored and claimed the coasts of Newfoundland for England in 1497. In 1524, Giovanni da Verrazzano explored part of Atlantic Canada for France. In the early 1800s, Italians began migrating to Canada with the majority arriving in the late 1890s and early 1900s. Many Italians participated and took part in building Canadian cities, working on the railroad, building ports, shipping and mining; all of which led to the modern creation of Canada.

For most of World War I (1914–1918), Canada (under the British Empire) and Italy were allies during the war. During World War II (1939–1945), Canada and Italy were on opposing sides. On 10 June 1940, Canada declared war on Italy after Italian Prime Minister Benito Mussolini declared war on France and the United Kingdom. Canada partook in the Italian Campaign and the 1st Canadian Division and 1st Canadian Armoured Brigade participated in the invasion of Sicily, Moro River Campaign and in the Battle of Monte Cassino. Between 1940 and 1943, approximately 600 Italian-Canadian men were arrested and sent to internment camps as potentially dangerous enemy aliens. After the war had ended, Canada and Italy established diplomatic relations in 1947.

Canada and Italy have signed several bilateral agreements such as an Agreement on the Avoidance of Double Taxation with Respect to Taxes on Income and for the Prevention of Fiscal Evasion (1977) and an Agreement of Social Security (1977). In 1981, both nations signed an Extradition Treaty and in 1984, both nations signed a Cultural Cooperation Agreement. There are direct flights between both nations with the following airlines: Air Canada, Air Transat, ITA Airways and WestJet.

There have been numerous visits between Canadian and Italian Prime Ministers, most mainly taking place in summits held by the G7, G8, G20 and NATO.

== High-level visits ==
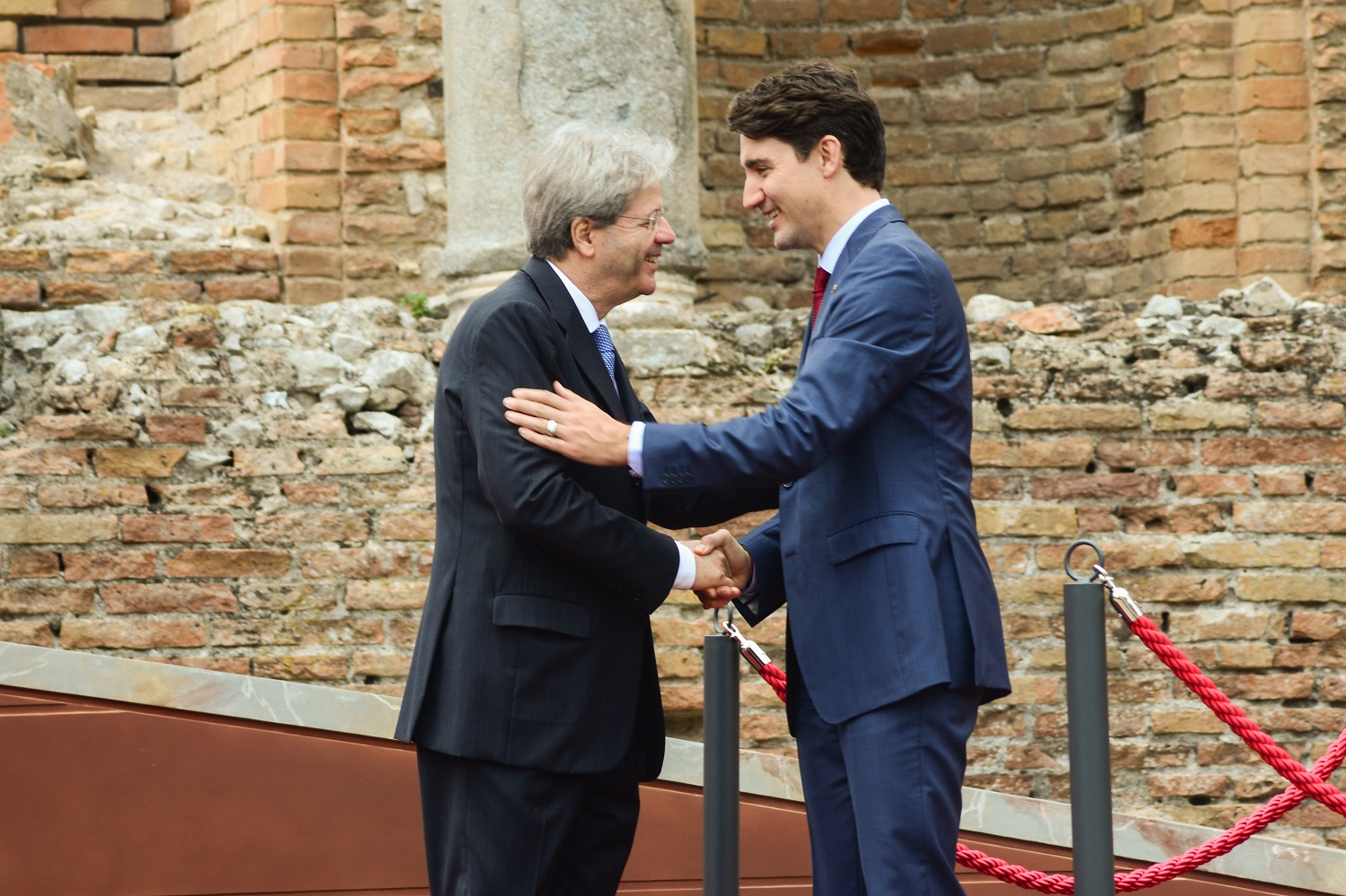
Italian PM Paolo Gentiloni with Canadian PM Justin Trudeau at the 43rd G7 in Taormina, Italy (2017)

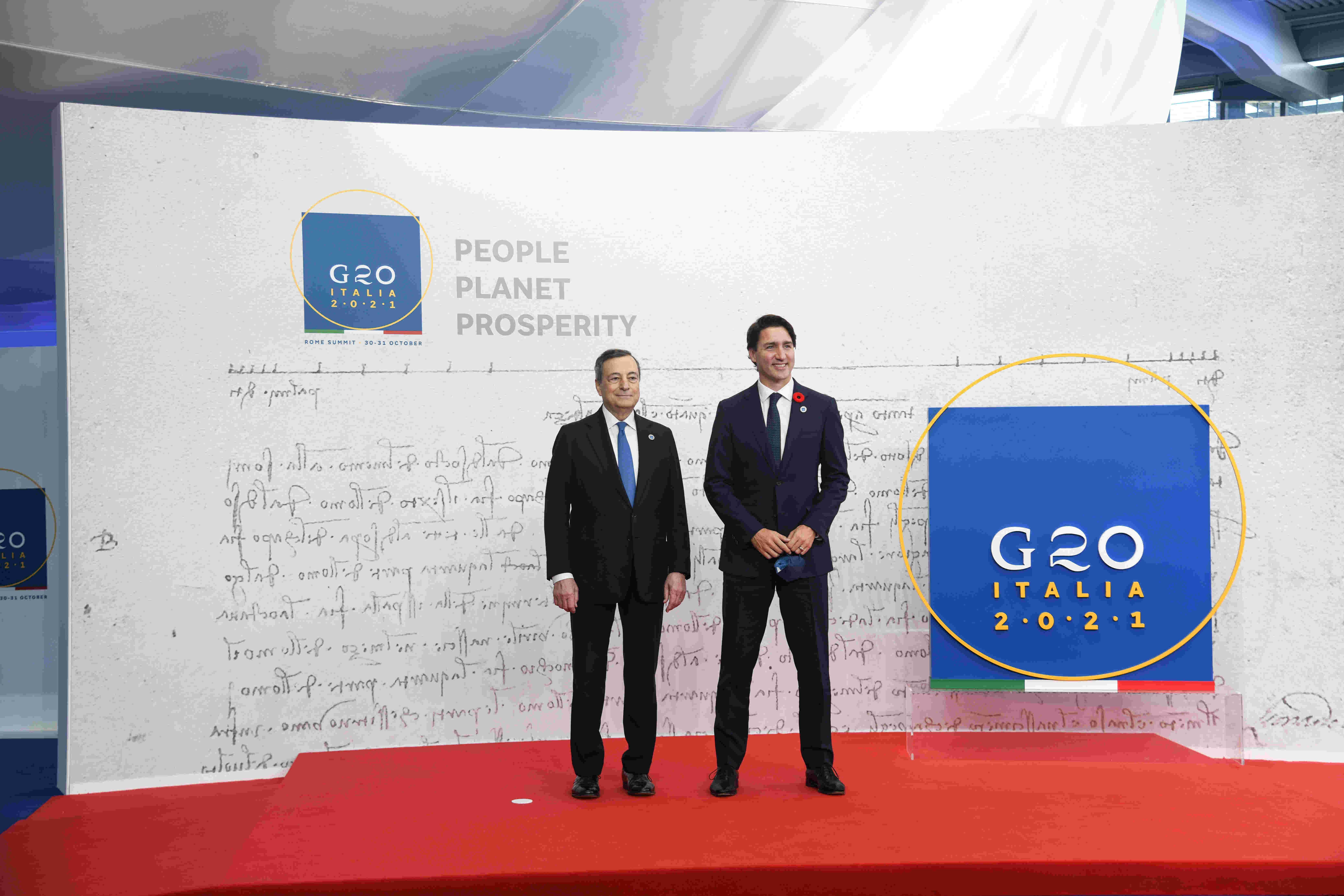
Italian Prime Minister Mario Draghi and Canadian Prime Minister Justin Trudeau at the 2021 G20 Rome summit.

Visits from Canada to Italy

- Prime Minister Pierre Trudeau (1980)
- Prime Minister Brian Mulroney (1987, 1991)
- Prime Minister Jean Chrétien (1994, 2001, 2002)
- Prime Minister Stephen Harper (2009)
- Prime Minister Justin Trudeau (2017, 2021)
- Governor General Julie Payette (2019)

Visits from Italy to Canada

- Prime Minister Giovanni Spadolini (1981)
- Prime Minister Ciriaco De Mita (1988)
- Prime Minister Lamberto Dini (1995)
- Prime Minister Giuliano Amato (2001)
- Prime Minister Silvio Berlusconi (2002, 2010)
- Prime Minister Enrico Letta (2013)
- President Sergio Mattarella (2017)
- Prime Minister Giuseppe Conte (2018)

== Trade ==
In 2016, trade between Canada and Italy totaled C$9.88 billion. Canada's main exports to Italy include: Pharmaceutical products, cereals and mineral fuels. Italy's main exports to Canada include: Nuclear Reactors and machinery, beverages and vehicles (parts and motors). Italy is Canada's 8th largest global merchandise trading partner, and 3rd most important trading partner in the European Union. At the end of 2016, Italy ranked as the 28th largest investor country of FDI stock in Canada. In terms of European countries, Italy ranked 15th. In October 2016, Canada and the European Union (which includes Italy) signed the Comprehensive Economic and Trade Agreement, a free-trade agreement between Canada and the European Union.

== Resident diplomatic missions ==
of Canada in Italy

- Rome (Embassy)
- Milan (Consulate)

of Italy in Canada

- Ottawa (Embassy)
- Montreal (Consulate-General)
- Toronto (Consulate-General)
- Vancouver (Consulate-General)
- Edmonton (Consular Office)

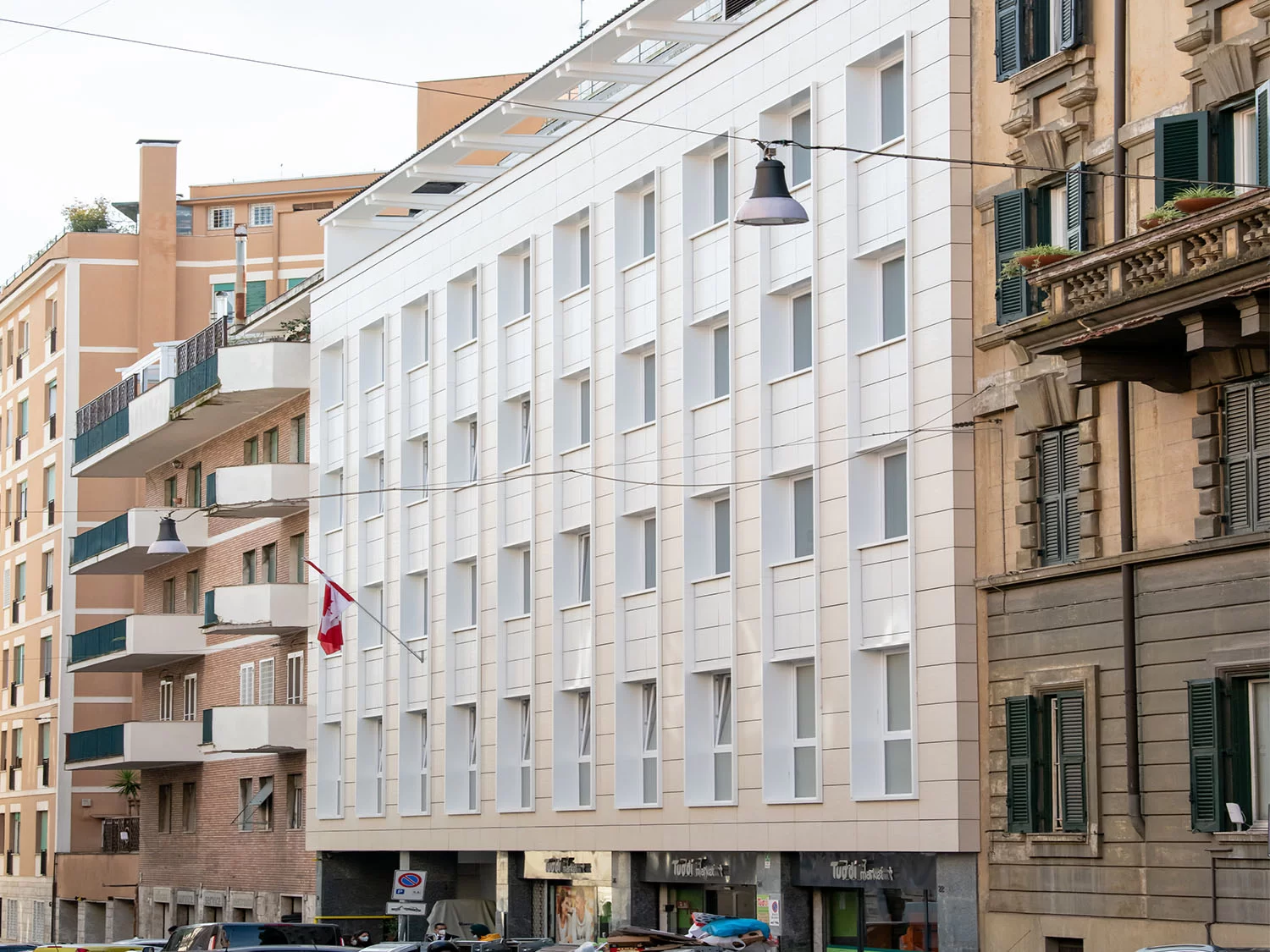
Embassy of Canada in Rome

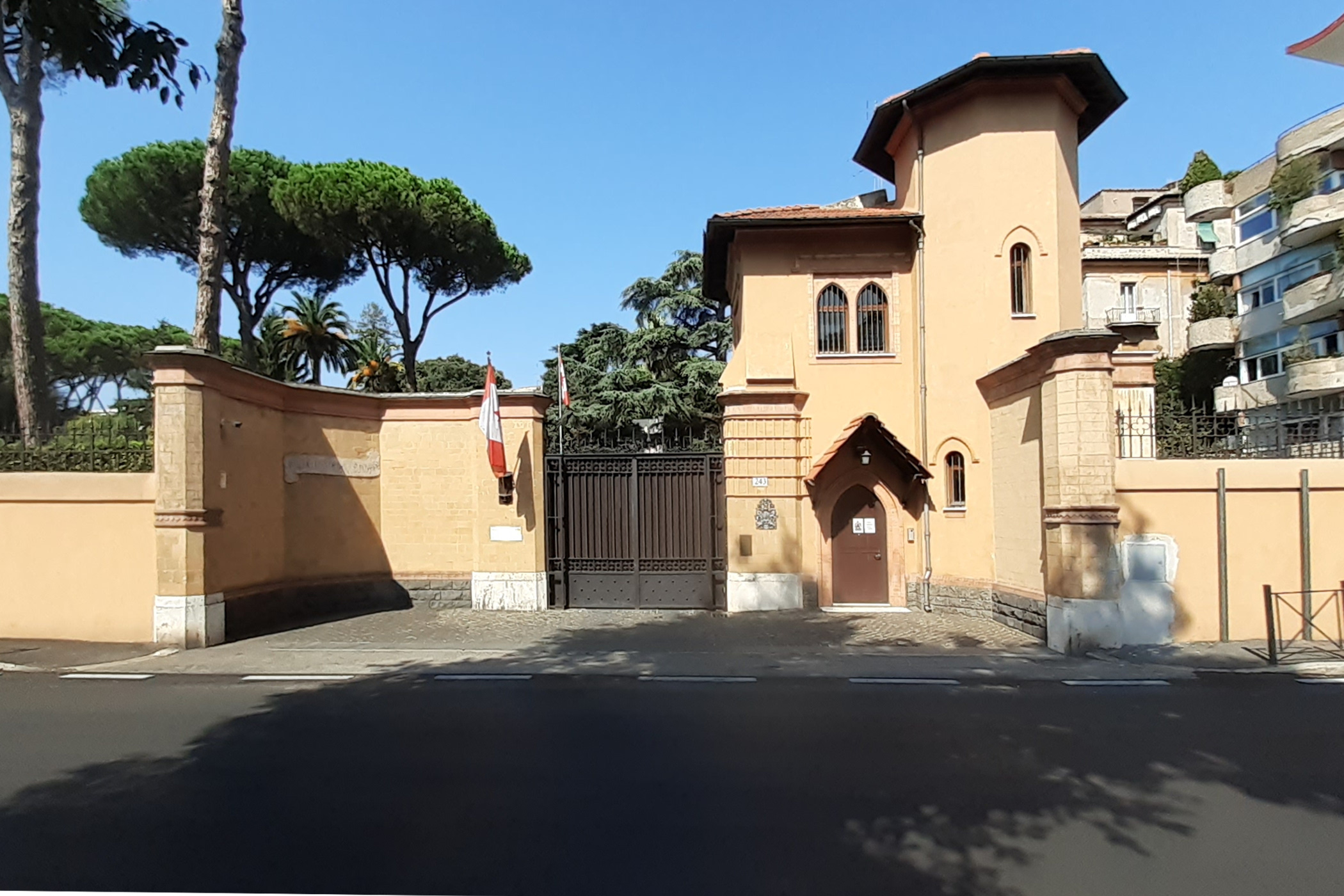
Trade Commission Office of the Embassy of Canada in Rome

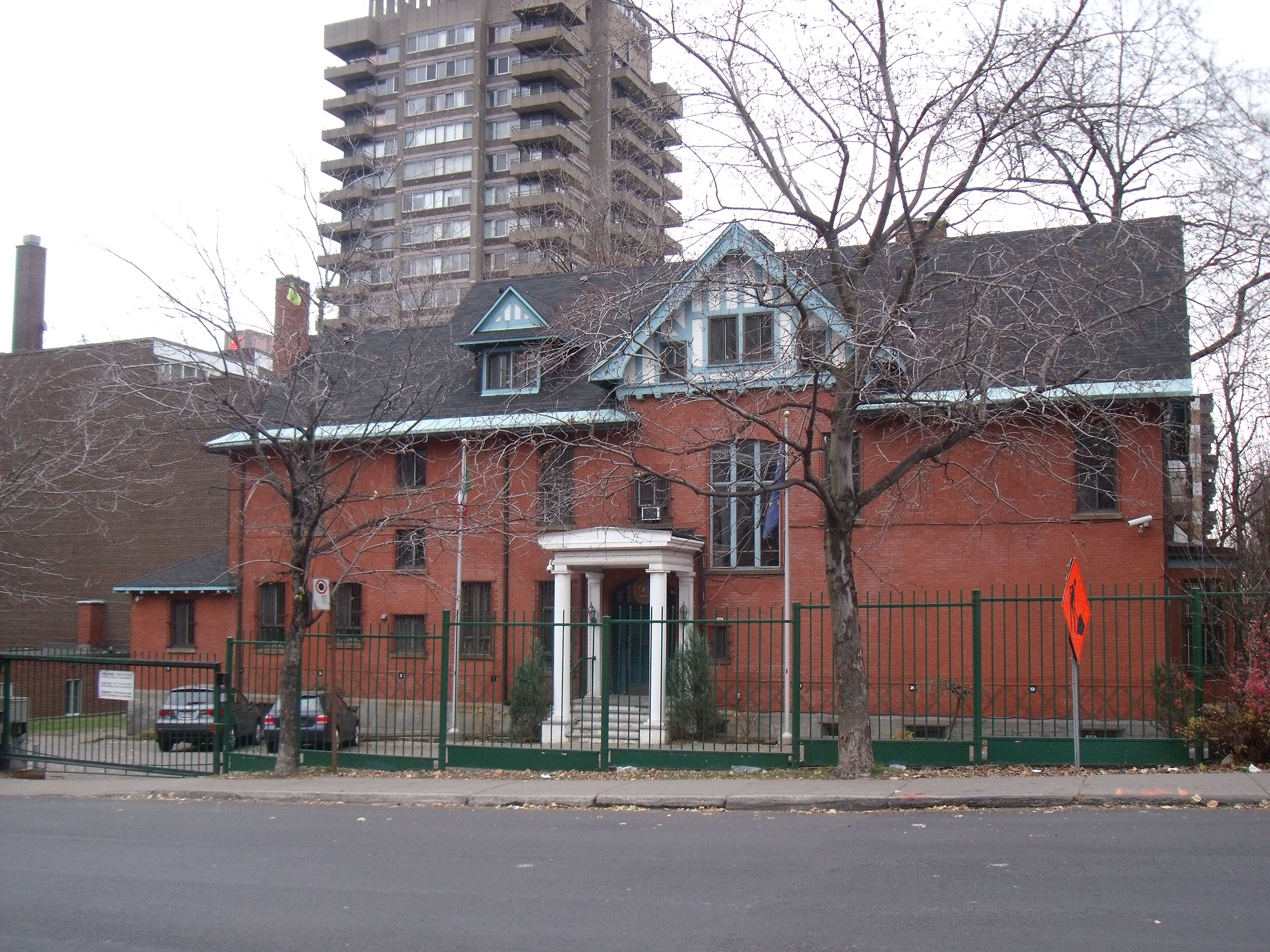
Consulate-General of Italy in Montreal

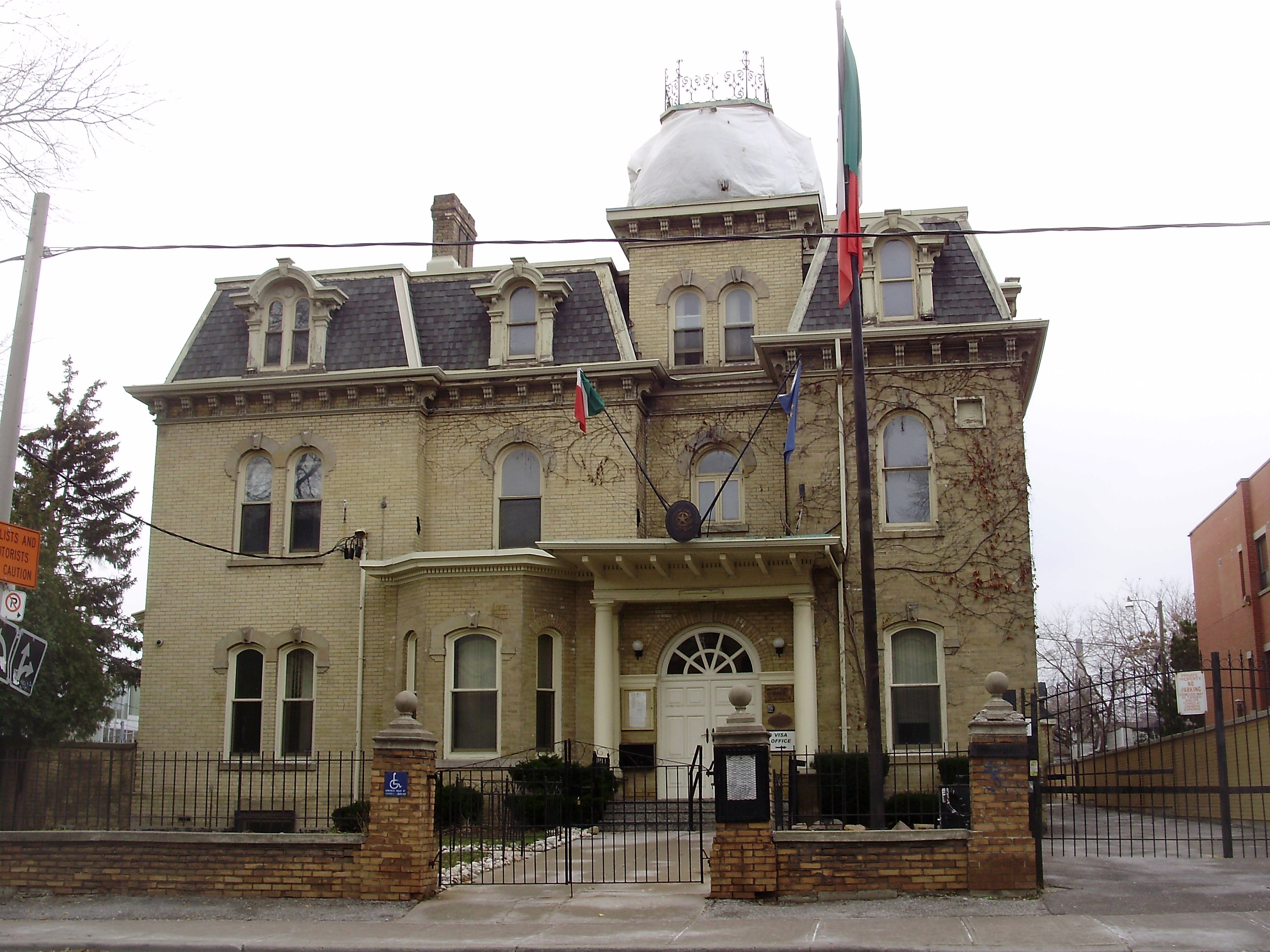
Consulate-General of Italy in Toronto

== See also ==
- Italian Canadian internment
- Italian Canadians
- Italian language in Canada
- Foreign relations of Canada
- Foreign relations of Italy
- Canada–EU relations
