= Internment of Italian Canadians =

Mass incarceration in Canada during World War II

The internment of Italian Canadians was the forced relocation and incarceration of Italian Canadians during World War II following Italy's declaration of war against the United Kingdom on June 10, 1940. Through the War Measures Act, the government of Canadian Prime Minister William Lyon Mackenzie King gave itself the power to suspend habeas corpus, revoke rights, seize property and arrest those who were deemed a threat to the safety of Canada—labelling 31,000 Italian Canadians as "enemy aliens". Between 1940 and 1943, around 600 to 700 Italian-Canadian men were arrested and sent to internment camps as potentially dangerous "enemy aliens" with alleged fascist connections. In the decades that followed, political apologies were made for the internment of Italian Canadians.

== Enemy aliens ==
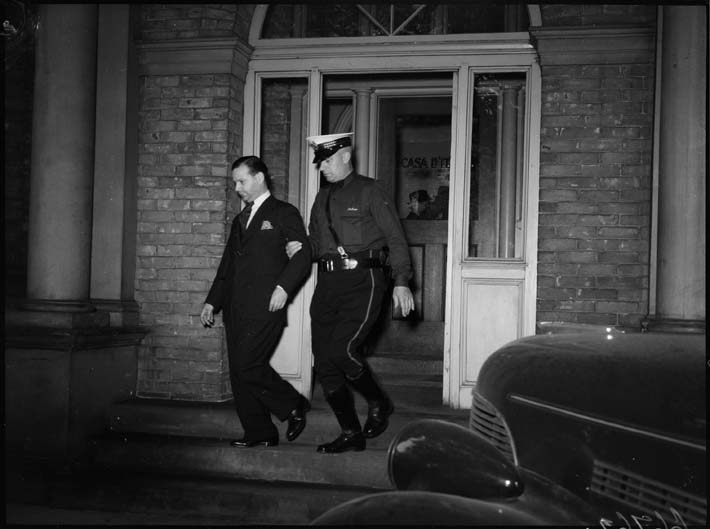
Italian-Canadian man being arrested at Casa d'Italia in Toronto on June 10, 1940

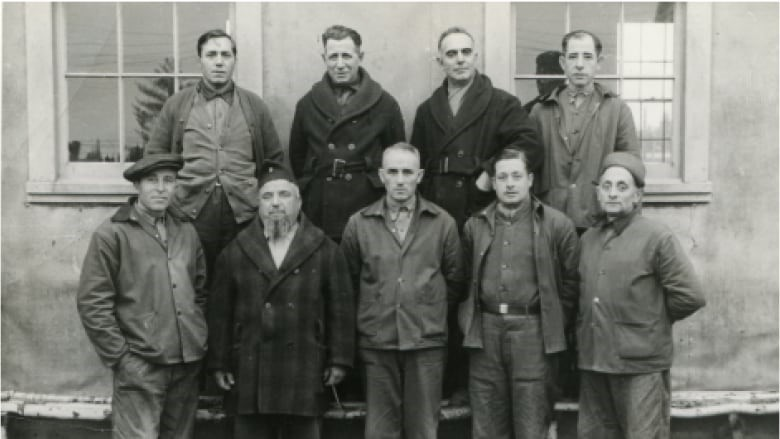
Italian-Canadian men at an internment camp

On June 10, 1940, following Italy's declaration of war against the United Kingdom, all fascist organizations in Canada were deemed illegal through the War Measures Act. They included the Casa d'Italia consulate on Beverley Street, the fascist newspaper Il Bollettino and the Dopolavoro ("After Work") social club. Casa d'Italia was seized by the Custodian of Enemy Property and sold to the Royal Canadian Mounted Police (RCMP). According to Enemies Within: Italian and Other Internees in Canada and Abroad, edited by historians Franca Iacovetta, Roberto Perin and Angelo Principe, an estimated 3,500 Italian Canadians were known to have been members of local fascist groups.

Newspaper accounts of the day, such as the Ottawa Citizen, stated that the "enemy alien" status was immediately placed on non-resident Italians older than 16 years of age, and on Italian Canadians who became British subjects after September 1929—about 31,000 Italian Canadians. The category later expanded to include nationals of belligerent states naturalized after 1922. Those affected by the War Measures Act and Defence of Canada Regulations were forced to register with the RCMP and report to them on a monthly basis.

Between 1940 and 1943, around 600 to 700 Italian-Canadian men were arrested and sent to internment camps as potentially dangerous "enemy aliens" with alleged fascist connections. While many Italian Canadians had initially supported fascism and Benito Mussolini's regime for its role in enhancing Italy's presence on the world stage, most Italians in Canada did not harbour any ill will against Canada and few remained committed followers of the fascist ideology.

Most of the Italian-Canadian men were interned at Camp Petawawa (Camp 33) in Petawawa, Ontario, as well as camps in Minto, New Brunswick and Kananaskis, Alberta, for several years.

A notable internee was Hamilton, Ontario's notorious bootlegger Rocco Perri.

== Legacy ==
In 1990, prime minister Brian Mulroney apologized for the war internment of Italian Canadians to a Toronto meeting of the National Congress of Italian Canadians: "On behalf of the government and the people of Canada, I offer a full and unqualified apology for the wrongs done to our fellow Canadians of Italian origin during World War II."

In May 2009, Massimo Pacetti introduced Bill C-302, an "Act to recognize the injustice that was done to persons of Italian origin through their 'enemy alien' designation and internment during the Second World War, and to provide for restitution and promote education on Italian Canadian history [worth $2.5 million]", which was passed by the House of Commons on April 28, 2010. Canada Post was also to issue a commemorative stamp in memory of the internment of Italian-Canadian citizens, however, Bill C-302 did not pass through the necessary stages to become law.

In 2013, as a part of the project Monument: Italian Canadian War Stories of the Columbus Centre in Toronto, funded by Villa Charities Inc. and Citizenship and Immigration Canada, artist Harley Valentine created a monument recognizing the internments called Riflessi: Italian Canadian Internment Memorial. The main statue is composed of profiles representing an internee family of Italian Canadians—a father, a pregnant mother, and a child—that combine to form a single figure in mirror polished stainless steel.

In September 2018, the RCMP planted a tree on the grounds of the Canadian Police College in Ottawa as a show of regret for their involvement with the internment of Italian Canadians.

On May 27, 2021, prime minister Justin Trudeau formally apologized for the war internment of Italian Canadians, at the House of Commons.

== See also ==
- Canada–Italy relations
- Internment of Italian Americans
- Internment of Ukrainian Canadians
