= Metcalfe Street (Ottawa) =

Street in downtown Ottawa

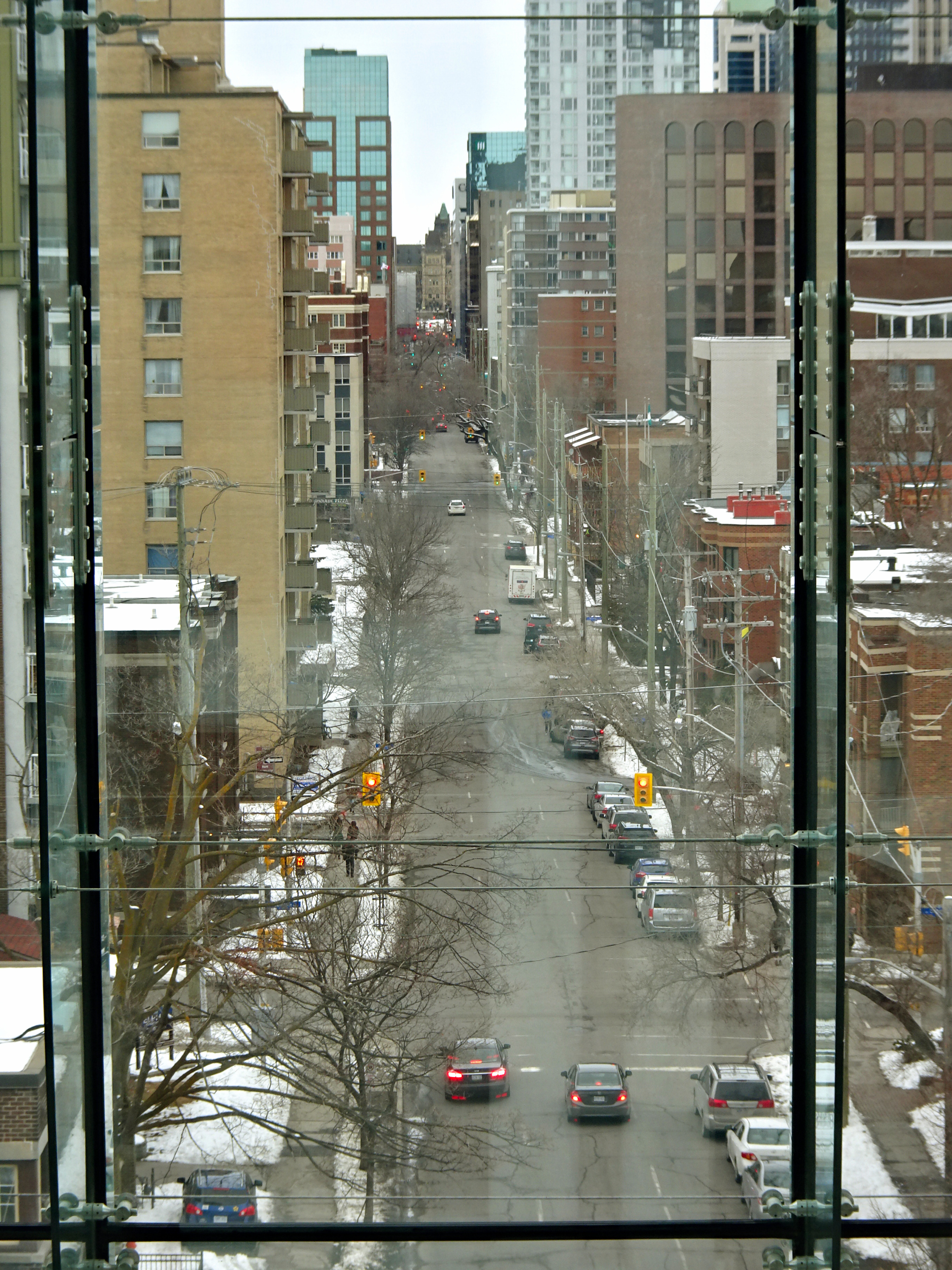
Metcalfe Street, looking north from the Museum of Nature.

Metcalfe Street (French: Rue Metcalfe) is a downtown arterial road in Ottawa, Ontario, Canada. It is named for Charles Theophilus Metcalfe, a 19th-century Governor General of the Province of Canada. It is a north-south route, operating one way northbound, providing a key thoroughfare from Highway 417 (the Queensway). In the late 19th century and the early 20th century, its homes included those of Ottawa mayor Thomas Birkett (306 Metcalfe, Embassy of the Republic of Hungary in Ottawa), Canada's lumber and railroad baron John Rudolphus Booth (252 Metcalfe, Booth House), inventor Thomas Willson a.k.a. Carbide Willson, and Alexander Campbell, law partner of John A. Macdonald (236 Metcalfe).

The southern terminus is at Monkland Avenue in The Glebe neighbourhood. It proceeds north as a minor residential street until the Queensway interchange (exit 119). As it continues north to downtown Ottawa, Metcalfe Street detours to the east of the Canadian Museum of Nature between Argyle Street and McLeod Street, and then continues straight until Wellington Street where the road ends at Parliament Hill.

== Major intersections ==
(from North to South):

- Wellington Street
- Sparks Street
- Albert Street
- Slater Street
- Laurier Avenue
- Somerset Street
- Gladstone Avenue
- Catherine Street
- Highway 417 (Queensway)
- Isabella Street
- Monkland Avenue

== See also ==
- Metcalfe Station (OC Transpo) (at Albert and Slater streets)
- Delegation of the European Commission to Canada (150 Metcalfe Street)
- High Commission of Barbados, Ottawa (55 Metcalfe Street)

== Sources ==
- Ottawa Transportation Master Plan, see map 7 Central Area/Inner City Road Network
