= Canada–Czech Republic relations =

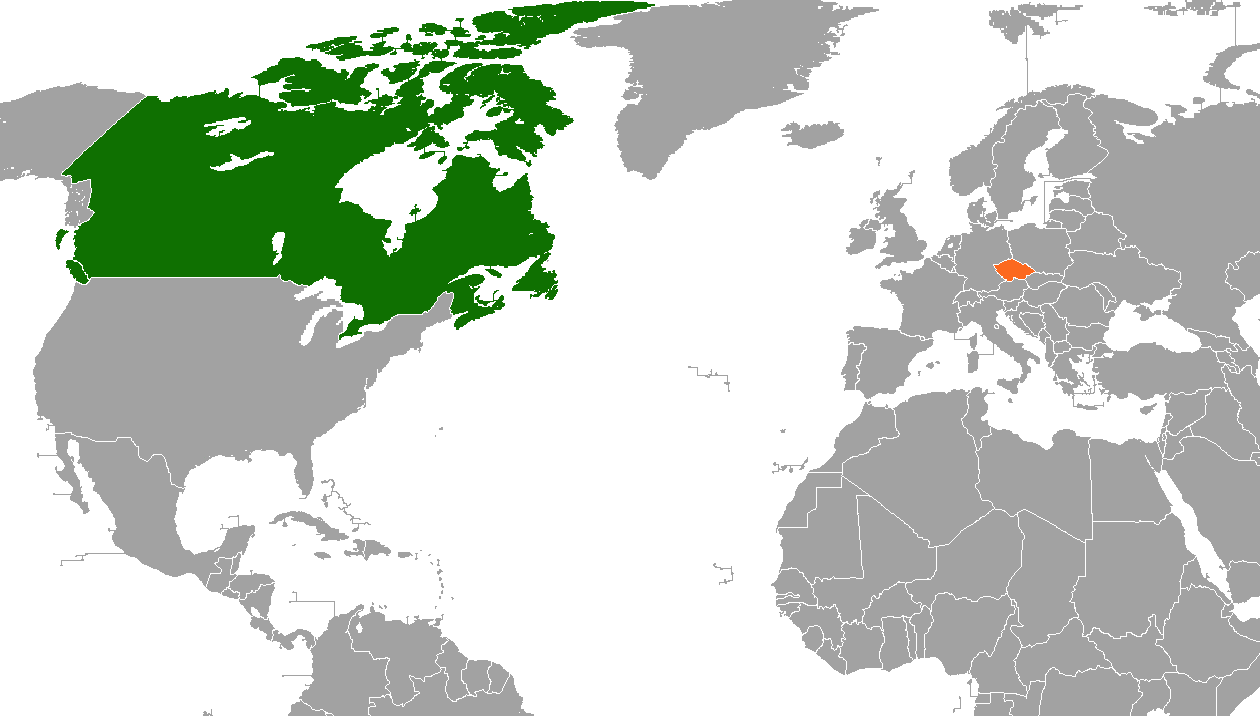

- Canada: Czech Republic

Canada and the Czech Republic maintain diplomatic relations. Both countries are full members of NATO and OECD. There are around 94,000 Canadians of Czech descent.

== Trade ==
In 2023, trade between both nations totaled CAD$225.1 million. Canadian goods sent to the CR made up of aircraft, helicopters and parts, machinery, turbojets, turbo-propellers, medical instruments, pet food, pharmaceuticals, vitamins, iron/steel, plastics and non-alcoholic beverages. Exports from the CR totalled $446.6 million. Czech goods included machinery, iron and steel products, auto parts, tractors, tires, medical instruments, sports equipment, uranium, glass and beer.

== Visa dispute ==
In July 2009, Canada reinstated the requirement for people from the Czech Republic to have visas before entering Canada due to a high number of asylum seekers from the Czech Republic, mainly Roma, who allegedly abused the Canadian asylum system.

The Czech Republic reciprocated by recalling its ambassador to Canada for consultations, imposing visa requirement for holders of Canadian diplomatic and official passports, and asking the European Commission to require visas for Canadian citizens to enter the European Union. (The Czech Republic, as a member of the Schengen Zone, cannot unilaterally implement visa requirements or controls for Canadian citizens).

On 6 May 2009 at the Canada-EU Summit in Prague (Czech Republic's capital) started negotiations of Comprehensive Economic and Trade Agreement (CETA), a proposed free trade and copyright agreement between Canada and the European Union. Signing and ratification by the Czech Republic are required for CETA to come into effect. Czech Republic declared it won't do either until the visa requirements by Canada are lifted.

On 14 November 2013 the Canadian ambassador to the Czech Republic Otto Jelinek announced reinstatement of visa-free regime for Czech citizens.

== Resident diplomatic missions ==
of Canada in the Czech Republic

- Prague (Embassy)

of Canada in the Czech republic

- Ottawa (Embassy)
- Toronto (Consulate-General)

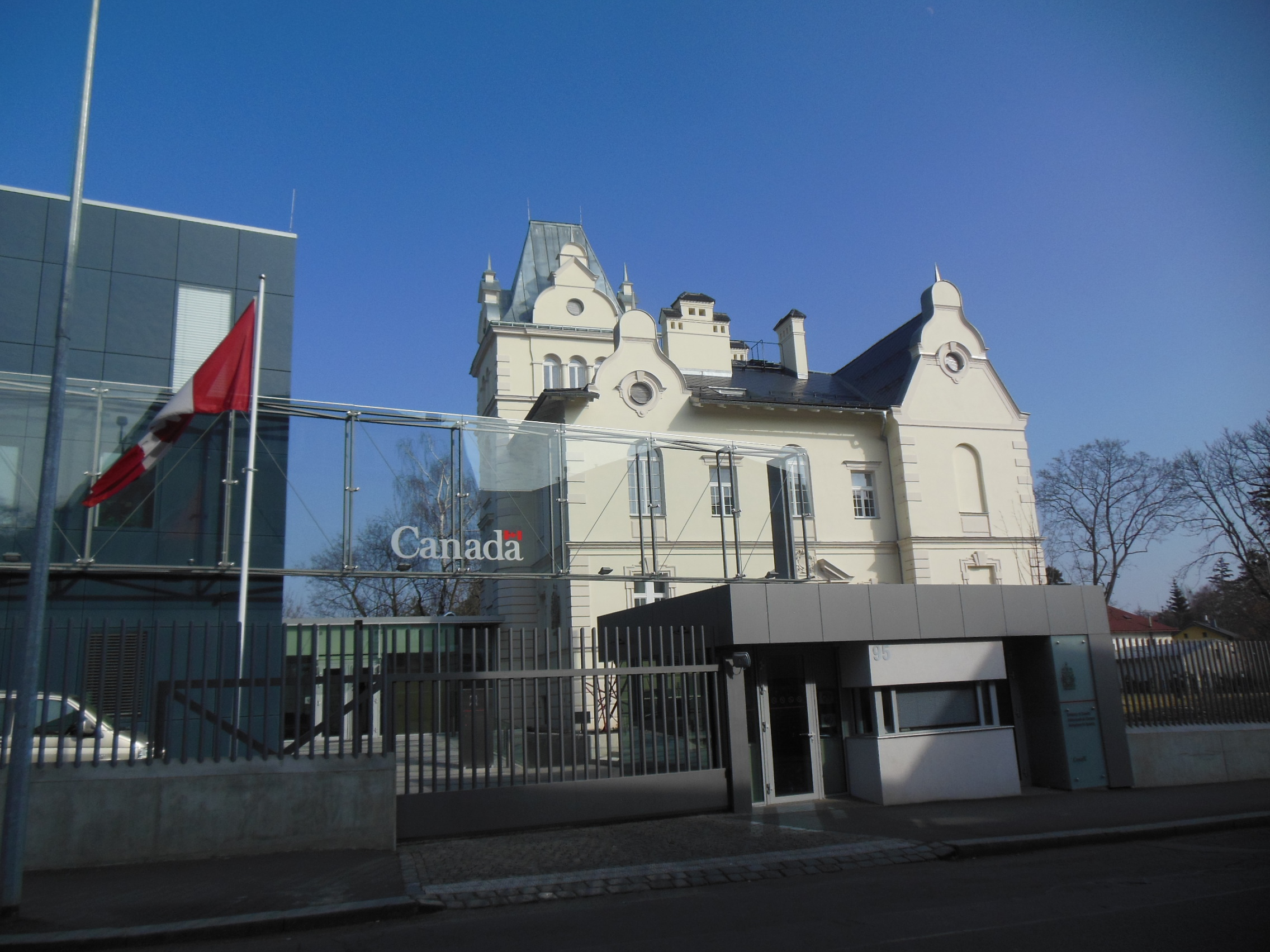
Embassy of Canada in Prague

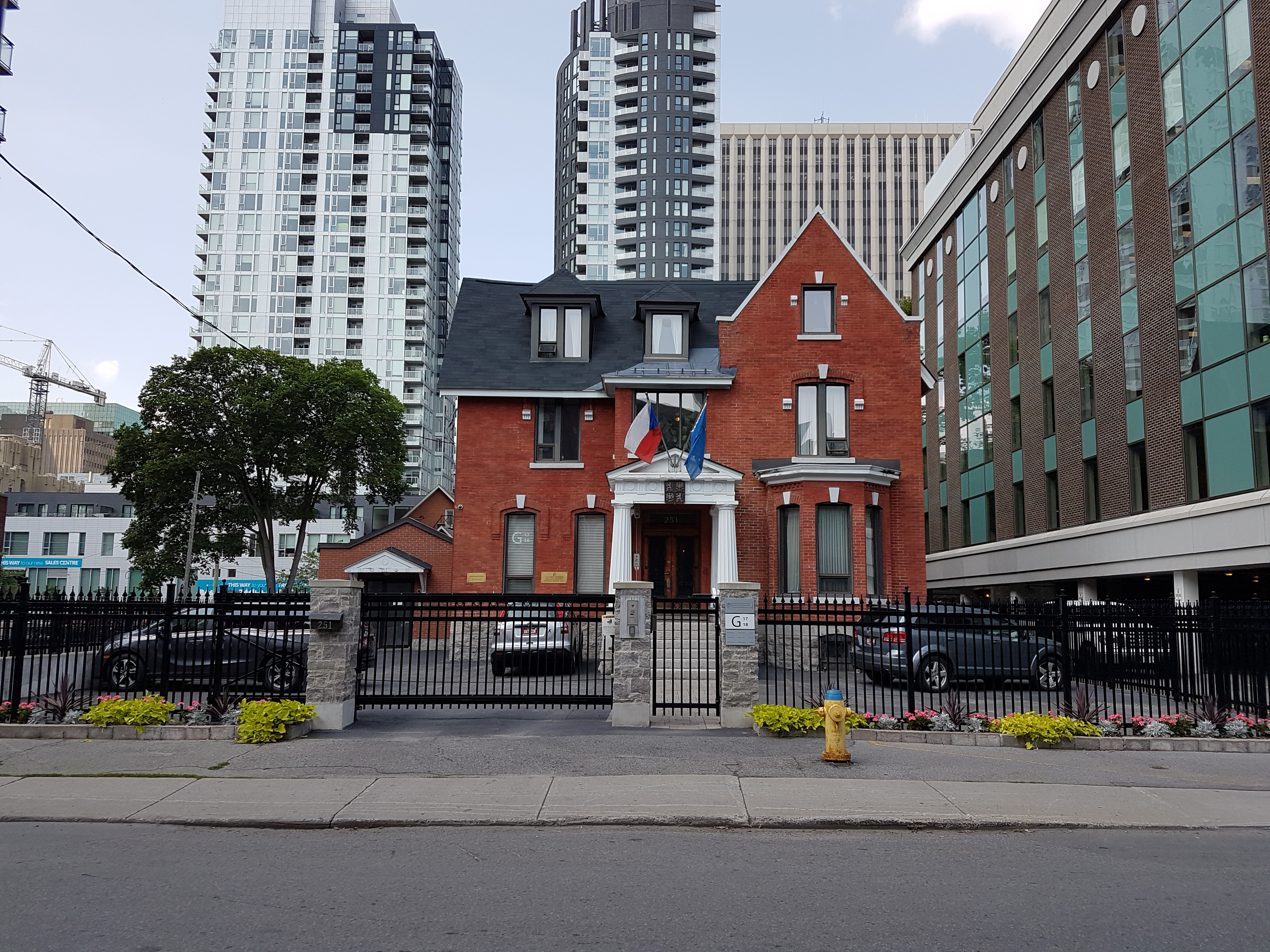
Embassy of the Czech Republic in Ottawa

== See also ==
- Foreign relations of Canada
- Foreign relations of Czech Republic
- Canada-EU relations
- NATO-EU relations
- Czech Canadians
