= Canada–Spain relations =

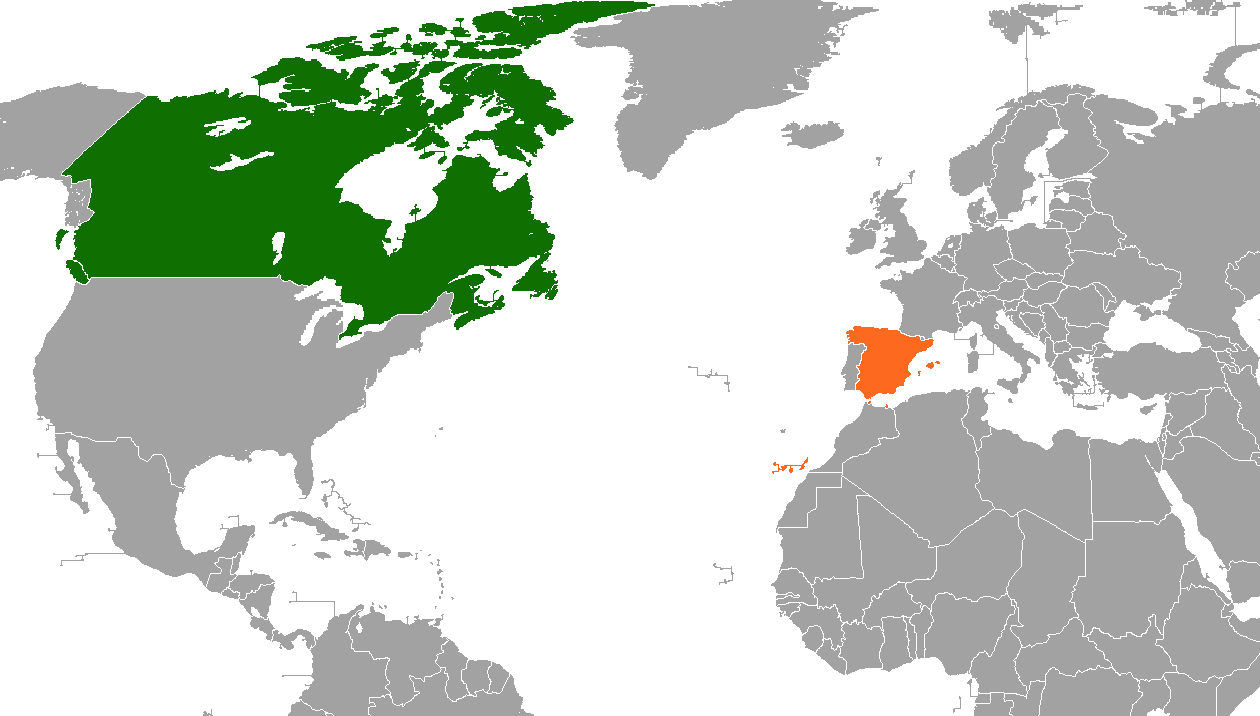

- Canada: Spain

Diplomatic mission
- Embassy of Canada, Madrid: Embassy of Spain, Ottawa

The relationship between Canada and Spain dates back to colonial times. Today, both nations are members of NATO, the Organisation for Economic Co-operation and Development and the United Nations.

== Historical relations ==
In July 1774, Spanish naval officer Juan José Pérez Hernández was the first European to encounter the archipelago of Haida Gwaii (formerly known as the Queen Charlotte Islands) while on his way to Alaska. After the initial voyage, several other Spanish voyages were to take place along the British Columbia Coast. In 1789, Spain created two settlements in Santa Cruz de Nuca and Fort San Miguel, both located in Nootka Sound. At the maximum extent of the Spanish Empire in the Americas, Spain controlled territories from the end of the Southern Cone to current Alberta and Saskatchewan. In July 1935, Canada and Spain established diplomatic relations.

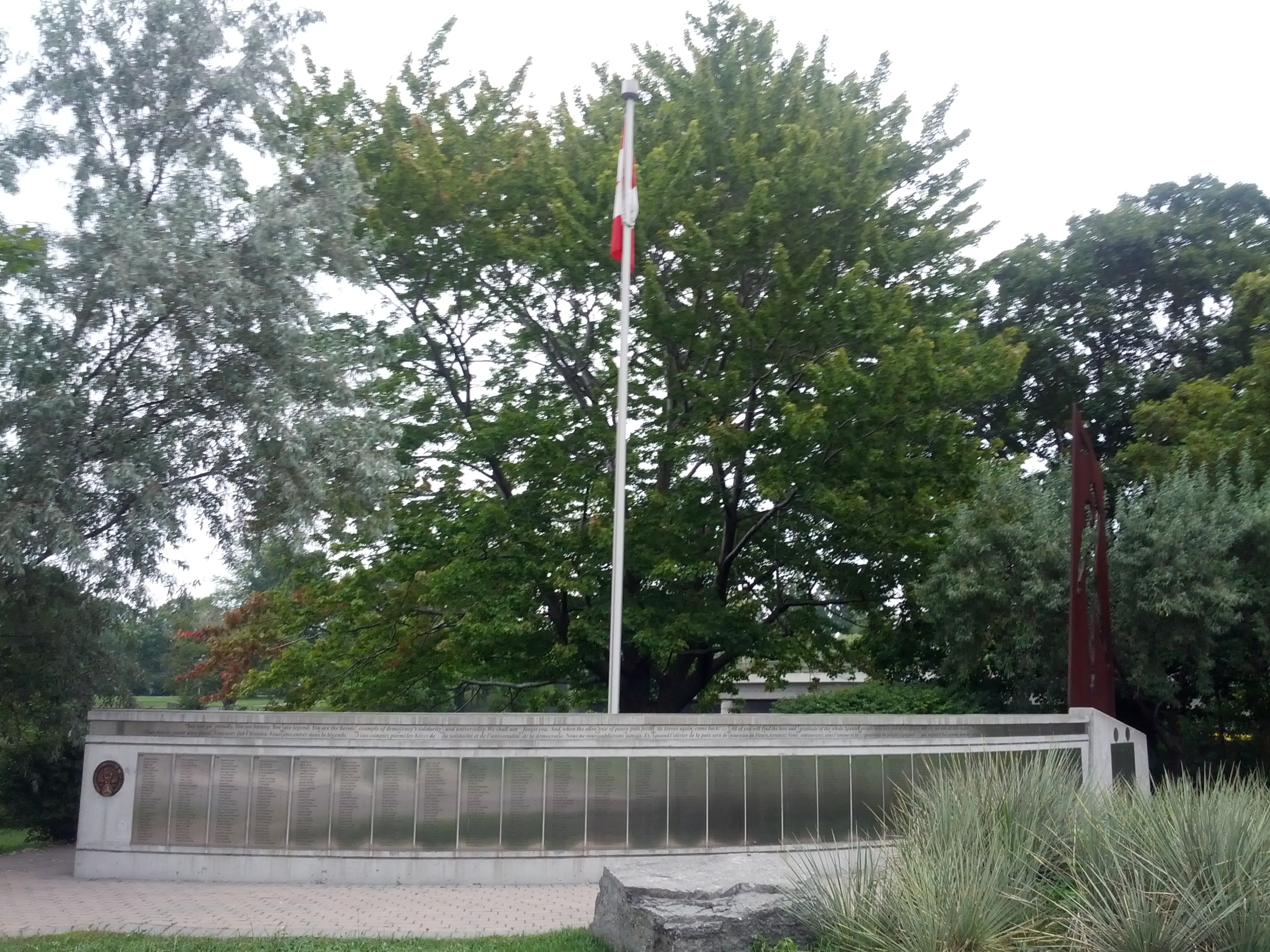
Memorial to the Mackenzie–Papineau Battalion in Ottawa.

From 1936 to 1939, Spain was embroiled in a civil war between the Republican faction and Nationalist faction. Although Canada was officially neutral during the conflict, over 1,700 Canadians volunteered and fought for the Republican faction in Spain. At first, the Canadian volunteers joined the primarily American Lincoln Battalion (also known as the Abraham Lincoln Brigade), and the George Washington Battalion, before creating a primarily Canadian brigade known as the Mackenzie–Papineau Battalion (Mac-Paps). During that time, the Canadian Parliament passed the "Foreign Enlistment Act in 1937" outlawing participation by Canadians in foreign wars. During the civil war, approximately 700 Canadians lost their lives fighting. In 1938, the Republican Faction was taking heaving loses and realized that they were losing the war. Several Canadian fighters left Spain and returned to Canada before General Francisco Franco entered Madrid and ended the war in April 1939.

== Bilateral relations ==
Since the end of World War II, Canada and Spain enjoy friendly and close diplomatic relations. In December 1959, both nations eliminated visa requirements for their citizens. In March 1995, relations between both nations reached an all-time low when a Spanish fishing boat called the "Estai" with a crew of 45 was seized just outside of Canada's Exclusive Economic Zone because the Canadian government accused Spain of overfishing turbots near its waters, triggering the Turbot War (guerra del fletán in Spanish). During the crisis, Spain imposed visas on Canadian citizens visiting Spain and threatened to break diplomatic relations with Canada. Spain began sending Serviola-class patrol boat to protect their trawlers when Canada began to cut the nets of Spanish trawlers fishing in the area. Support from the EU was split during the crisis, with the United Kingdom and Ireland supporting Canada while continental Europe and Iceland supported Spain. During negotiations between Canada and the European Union to resolve the issue, the crew of Estai posted a $500,000 bail and returned to Spain. The crisis was resolved when Canada and the European Union agreed to a deal on April 5. Under this agreement Spain was forced to leave the disputed zone and Canada's right to eject foreign fishing vessels from the area using military force was accepted. Under the deal Canada's own Greenland turbot quota was reduced, and they refunded the $500,000 fine to the owners of the Estai. Since the crisis, Canadian-Spanish relations improved and in 2007, a Memorandum of Understanding on Fisheries Cooperation was signed between both nations.

Canada's Minister of Agriculture and Food, Lawrence MacAulay, highlighted an increase in trade relations due to CETA's bilateral project with the EU and assured that both countries "have always been good friends." Canadian Foreign Minister Chrystia Freeland classified the bilateral relations between Canada and Spain as excellent and based on common values, with Canada being one of Spain's strongest allies. Likewise, both countries have supported each other in internal problems. On 12 October 2022, Canada illuminated Niagara Falls with the Spanish flag in commemoration of the National Day of Spain. A survey conducted in 2026 confirmed that Spain is one of the European countries whose population most strongly supports Canada's accession to the EU. Furthermore, the Canadian government has shown interest in Spanish infrastructure with a view to participating in railway projects connecting Calgary, Quebec, Toronto, and Vancouver.

=== Separatism movements in Catalonia and Quebec ===
During the 2017–2018 Spanish constitutional crisis caused by the Catalan declaration of independence, Canadian Prime Minister Justin Trudeau publicly announced, during a speech in Saint-Bruno-de-Montarville, that he opposed to the Catalan secessionism and expressed his support for a united Spain. On the other hand, in Quebec, the leader of the pro-independence party Bloc Québécois, Martine Ouellet, urged for Canada to recognize Catalonia. Jean-François Lisée, the head of the Parti Québécois, confirmed that his party also supported the Catalan independence. However, the Liberal Premier of Quebec, Phillippe Couillard, stated an Official Policy of neutrality. Most other members of the Conservative Party of Canada also kept neutral. CBC News and The Walrus reported that many Quebec separatists had enthusiastically responded to the Catalan declaration of independence. Global News reported that pro-Catalan independence rallies had been organized in Quebec.

In 2019, the escaped and self-declared president of Catalonia, Carles Puigdemont, was banned from entering Canada after he attempted to attend a Meeting at the Saint-Jean-Baptiste Society. The move was criticized by Jagmeet Singh and Véronique Hivon. In the same year, Puigdemont threatened to sue Canada for banning him.

== High-level visits ==
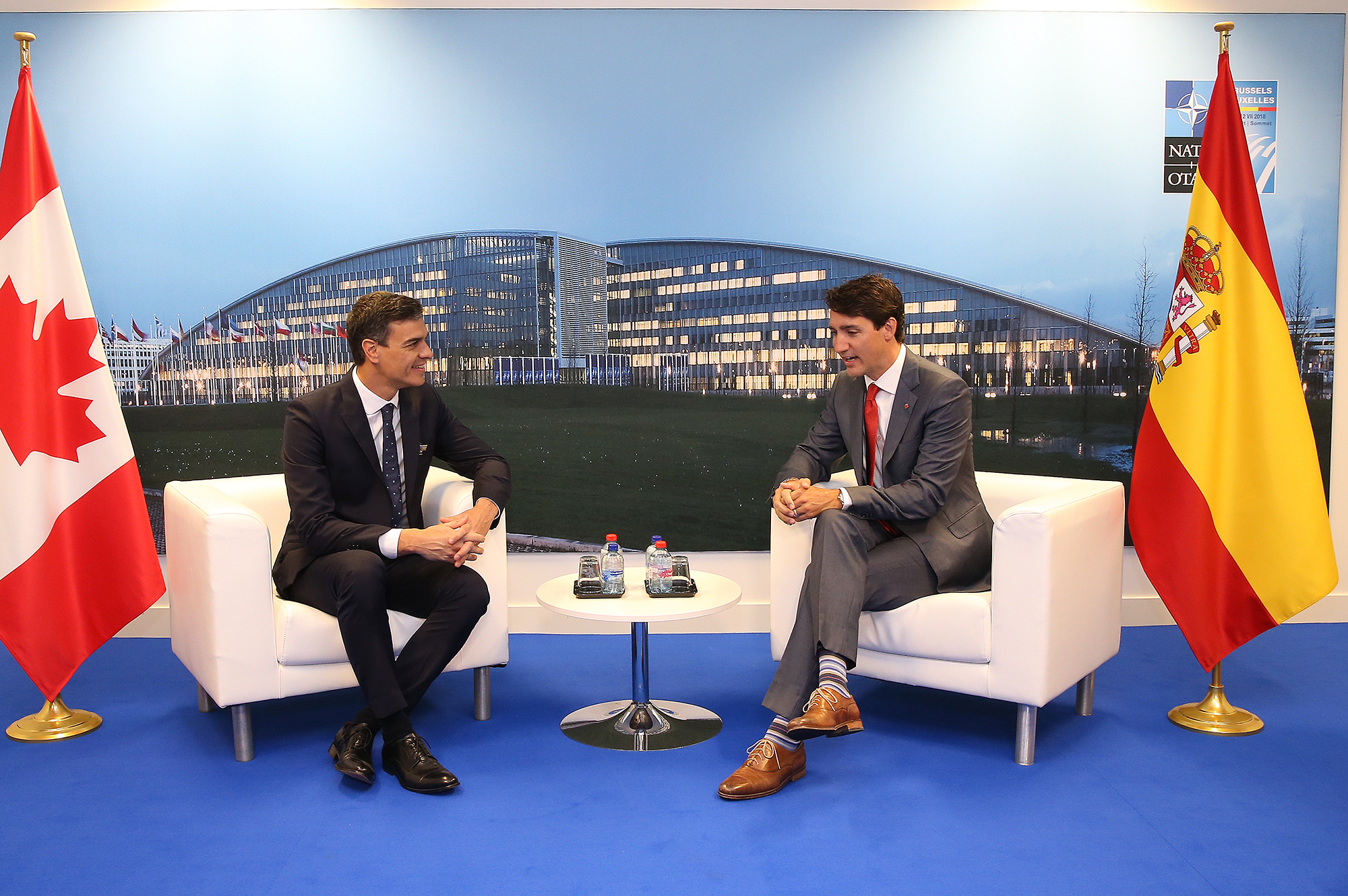
Canadian Prime Minister Justin Trudeau and Spanish Prime Minister Pedro Sánchez meeting during the 2018 Brussels summit.

Prime Ministerial visits from Canada to Spain

- Prime Minister Pierre Trudeau (1982)
- Prime Minister Jean Chrétien (1997)
- Prime Minister Justin Trudeau (2022)

Prime Ministerial and Royal visits from Spain to Canada

- King Juan Carlos I (1984, 1991)
- Crown Prince (current King) Felipe VI (1989)
- Prime Minister José María Aznar (2001)
- Prime Minister José Luis Rodríguez Zapatero (2010)
- Prime Minister Pedro Sánchez (2018)

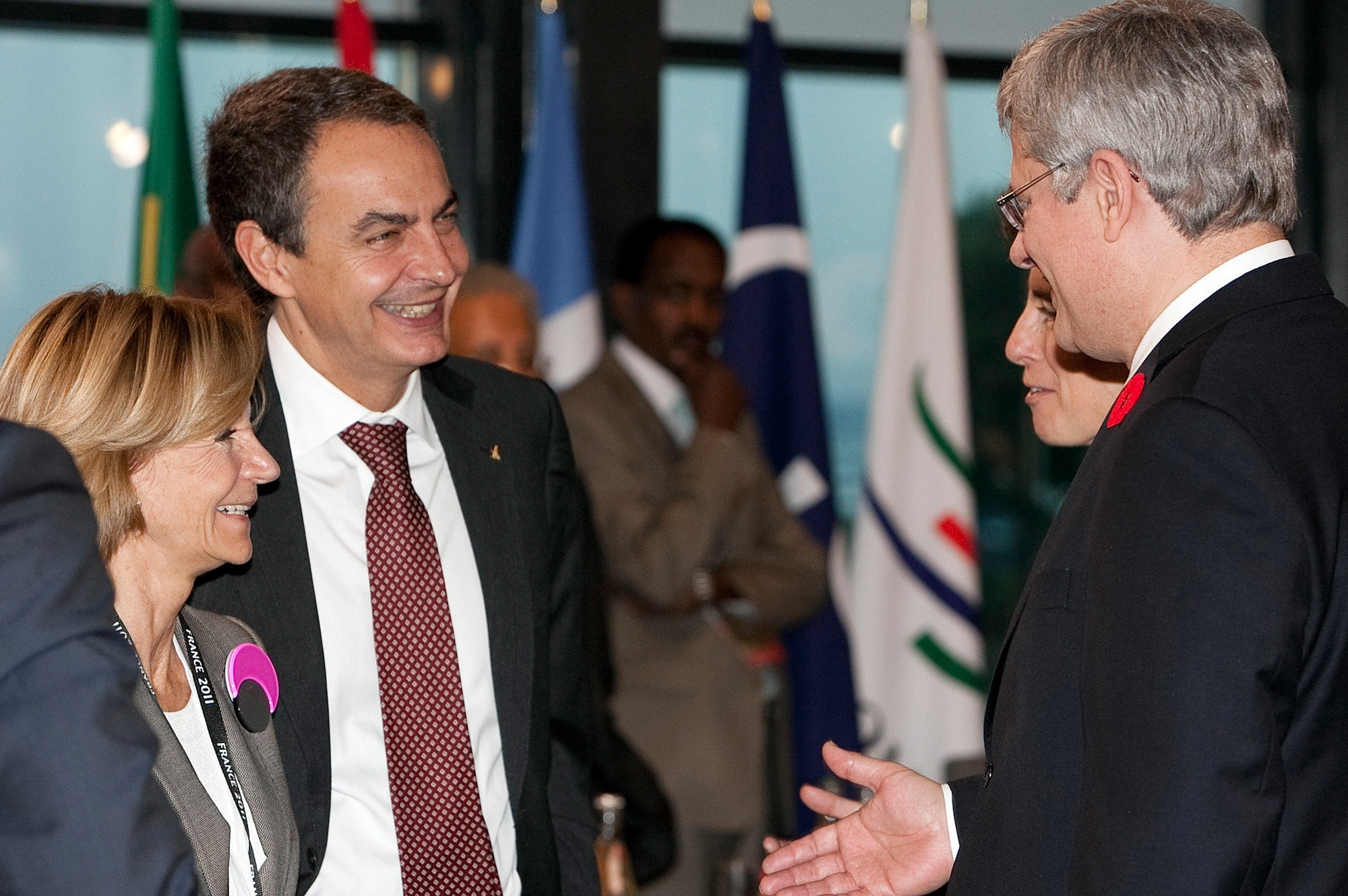
Prime Minister José Luis Rodríguez Zapatero and Prime Minister Stephen Harper in Cannes, France; 2011.

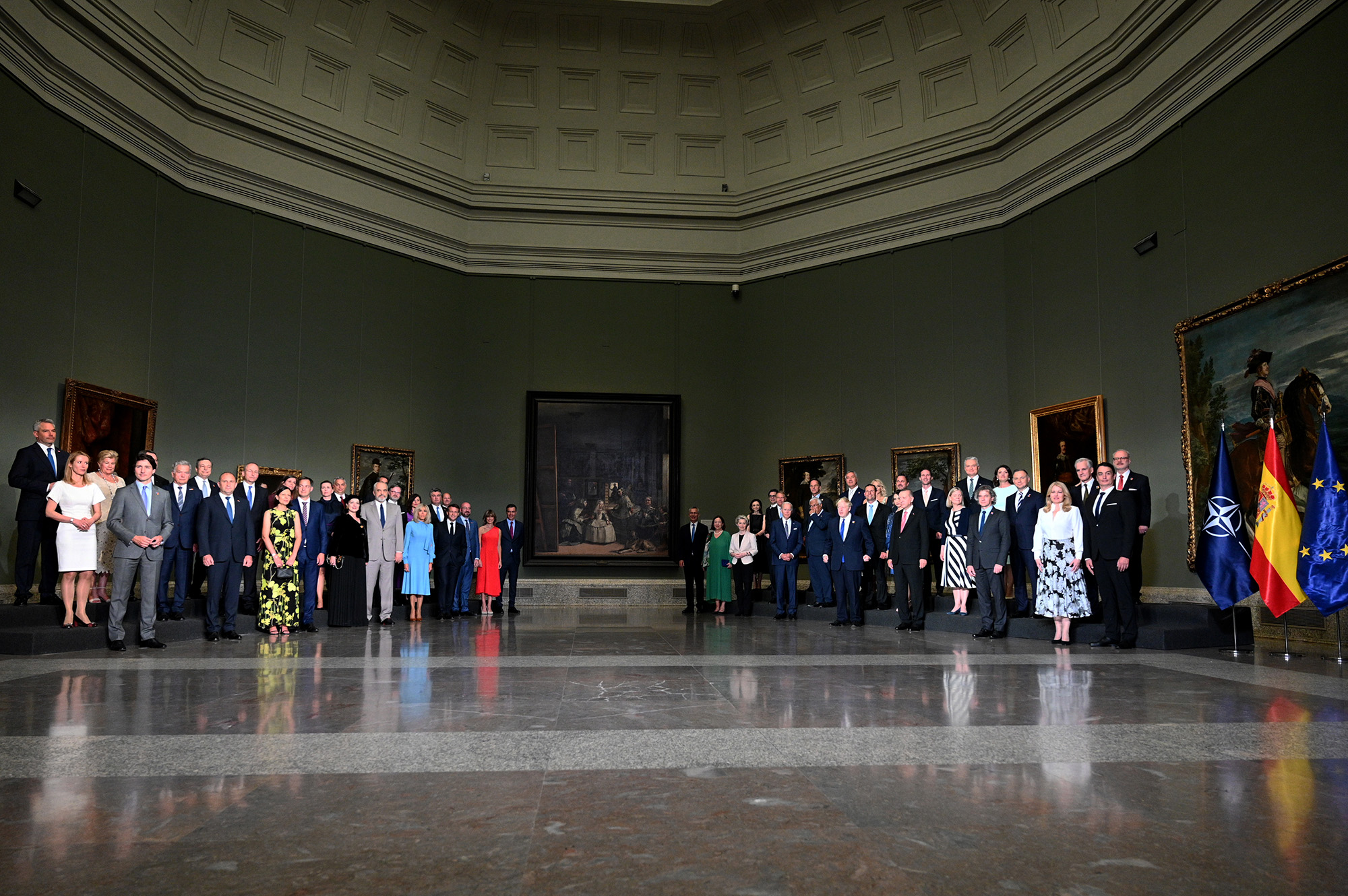
Prime Ministers Pedro Sánchez and Justin Trudeau at the Museo del Prado, Madrid; June 2022.

== Trade ==
In 2024, trade between Canada and Spain totaled $7.9 billion dollars. Canada's exports to Spain include: aircraft and parts, ores and ash, cereals, machinery equipment and energy related products. Spain's exports to Canada include: pharmaceutical products, combustibles, oil and minerals, beverages and electronic equipment. Canadian multinational companies such as Bombardier Inc., BlackBerry and Thomson Reuters operate in Spain, whereas Spanish multinational company Zara operates in Canada. In 2014, Canada and the European Union (which includes Spain) concluded an agreement on a free trade agreement known as the "Comprehensive Economic and Trade Agreement (CETA)".

== Resident diplomatic missions ==
of Canada in Spain

- Madrid (Embassy)
- Barcelona (Consulate)

of Spain in Canada

- Ottawa (Embassy)
- Montreal (Consulate-General)
- Toronto (Consulate-General)

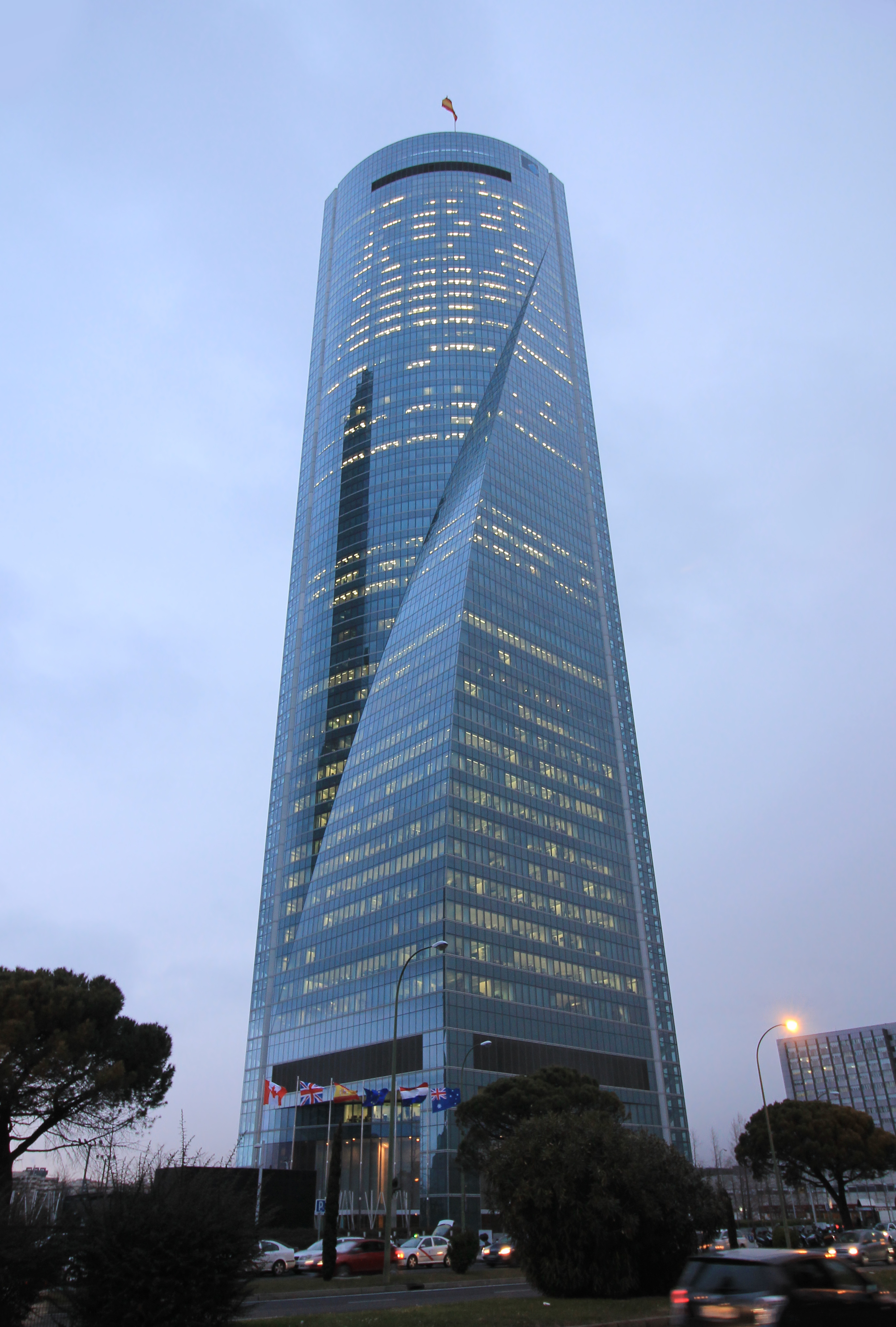
Embassy of Canada in the Torre Emperador in Madrid

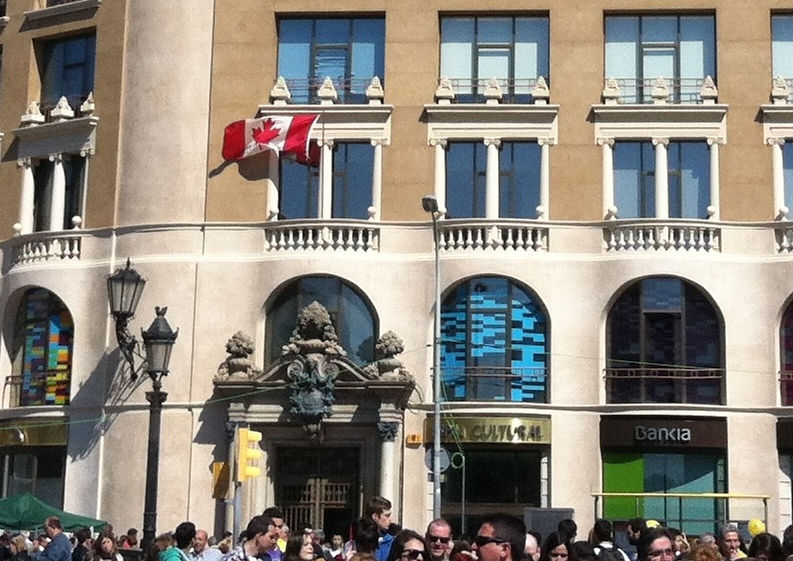
Consulate of Canada in Barcelona

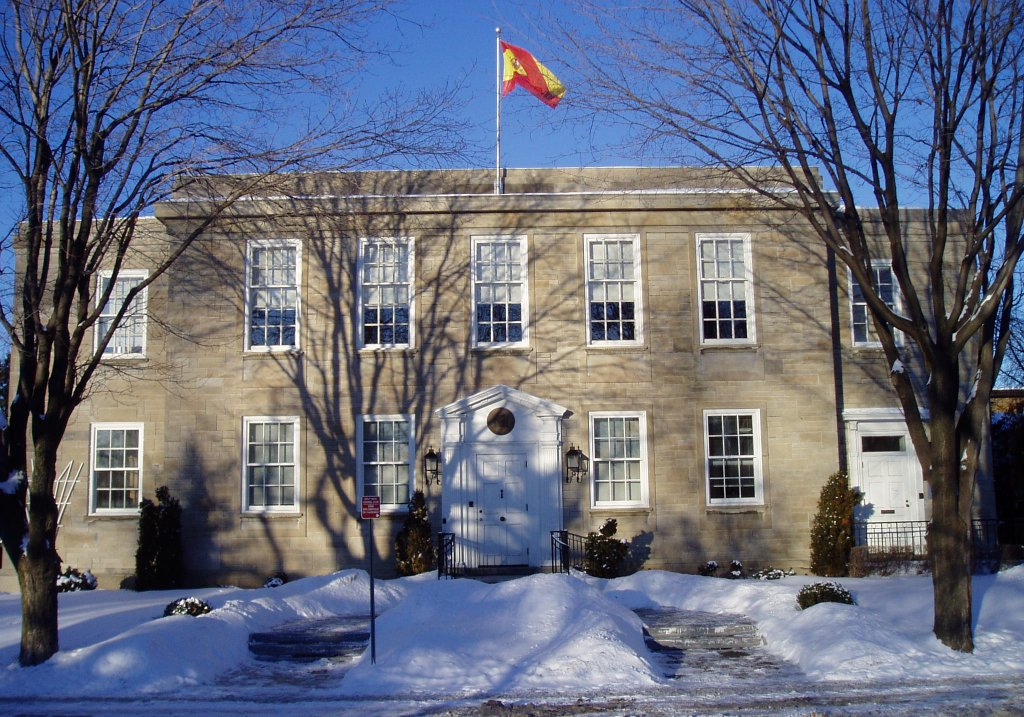
Embassy of Spain in Ottawa

== See also ==
- Spanish Canadians
- Canada–EU relations
