= Mission of Canada to the European Union =

Diplomatic mission of Canada to the European Union

- Location: Brussels, Belgium
- Address: Avenue des Arts 58
- Ambassador: Ailish Campbell
- Website: canada-eu.gc.ca

The Mission of Canada to the European Union is the diplomatic mission representing Canada to the European Union, located in Brussels, Belgium. The head of the mission is the Ambassador of Canada to the European Union.

Formal relations were established in 1959, with the signing of the Agreement for Cooperation in the Peaceful Uses of Atomic Energy, and were the first for the EU with any industrialized country. The two other official representations in Brussels on behalf of Canada include the Embassy to Belgium and Luxembourg, and the Joint Delegation to NATO.

== See also ==
- Canada–European Union relations
- List of ambassadors of Canada to the European Union
