= Food Safety Regulation 2002 =

The Food Safety Regulation 2002 (EC) No. 178/2002 is an EU regulation that ensures high standards of food in the regulation of the internal market. The full title is "Regulation (EC) No 178/2002 of the European Parliament and of the Council of 28 January 2002 laying down the general principles and requirements of food law, establishing the European Food Safety Authority and laying down procedures in matters of food safety".

== Purpose and Scope ==
The Food Safety Regulation 2002 serves as the foundational framework for EU food law, designed to:

- Ensure a high level of protection of human health and consumer interests
- Facilitate the free movement of safe, wholesome food within the internal market
- Establish traceability requirements throughout the food chain.

== Contents ==
Article 14(2) requires that food is not place on the market if it is injurious to health or is unfit for human consumption.

== See also ==
- EU law
- UK enterprise law
