= State of the Union (European Union) =

Speech delivered to the EU Parliament

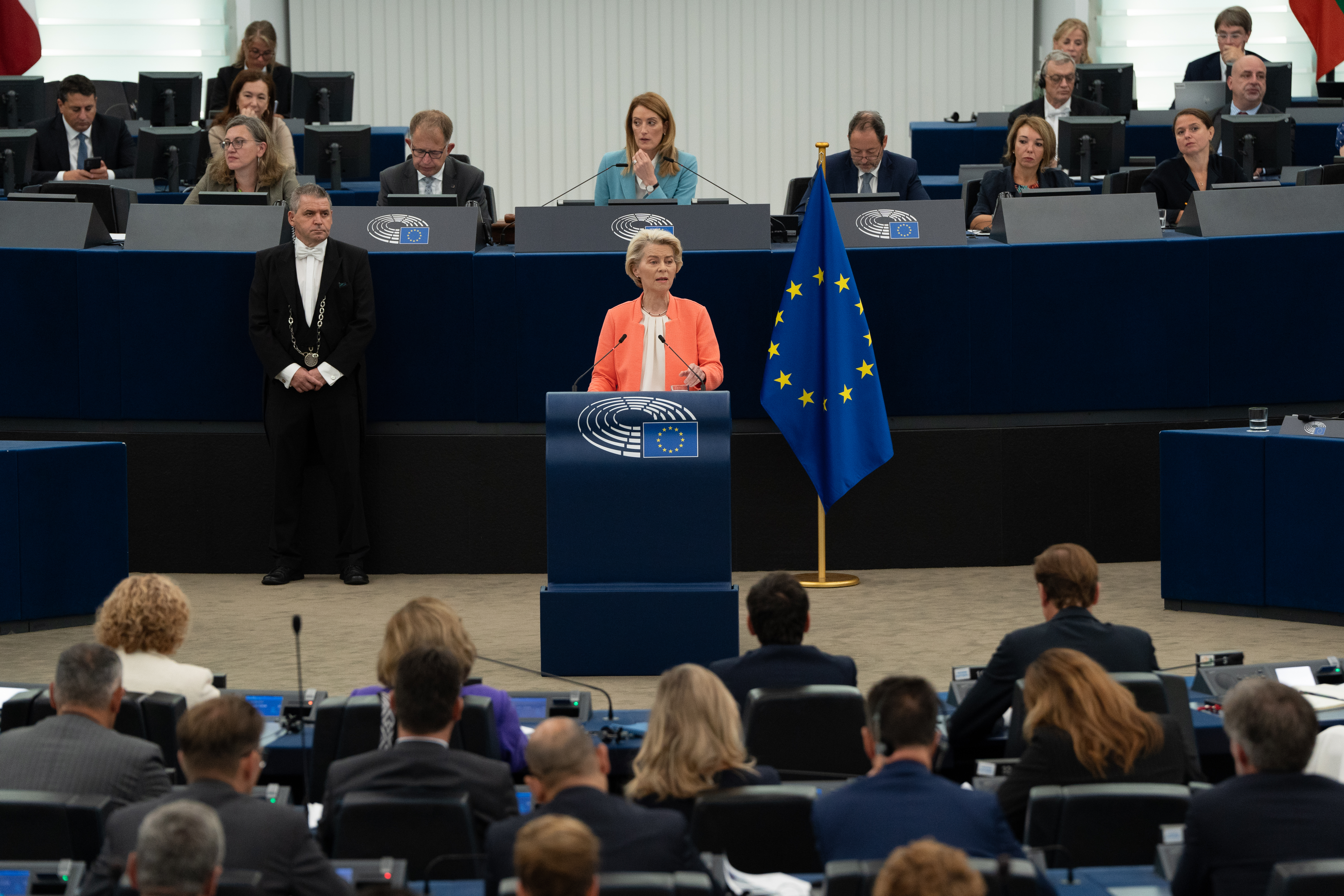
Ursula von der Leyen delivering the 2023 State of the Union address in Strasbourg. Right behind her, the President of the European Parliament, Roberta Metsola.

The State of the Union address, also known as the State of the European Union or SOTEU, is the annual speech addressed by the President of the European Commission to the European Parliament plenary session in September. The State of the Union address of the European Union was instituted by the Lisbon Treaty (with the 2010 Framework Agreement on relations between the European Parliament and the European Commission - Annex IV(5)), in order to make political life of the Union more democratic and transparent than it previously had been.

The Framework Agreement thus also foresees that the President of the European Commission sends a letter of intent to the President of the European Parliament and the Presidency of the Council of the European Union that sets out in detail the actions the European Commission intends to take by means of legislation and other initiatives until the end of the following year. The address is then followed by a plenary debate on the political situation of the Union, the so-called State of the Union debate.

== History ==
=== José Manuel Barroso ===
The first State of the Union speech of the European Union was pronounced on 7 September 2010 by President José Manuel Barroso. There he dealt mainly with the economic situation and unemployment issues;

The economic outlook in the European Union today is better than one year ago, not least as a result of our determined action. The recovery is gathering pace, albeit unevenly within the Union. Growth this year will be higher than initially forecast. The unemployment rate, whilst still much too high, has stopped increasing. Clearly, uncertainties and risks remain, not least outside the European Union.

In Barroso's second address, on 28 September 2011, he called for a eurozone bond and a financial transactions tax to stem the eurozone crisis and came out against the Franco-German proposal for an intergovernmental economic eurozone government - stating that that role belonged to the Commission;

For the euro area to be credible – and this not only the message of the federalists, this is the message of the markets – we need a truly Community approach. We need to really integrate the euro area, we need to complete the monetary union with real economic union.

In Barroso's third address, on 12 September 2012, he called for a "decisive deal to complete the EMU", by which he meant a new European treaty to "move towards a Federation of nation states", ahead of the European Parliamentary election in 2014.

He also acknowledged the need for "a serious discussion between the citizens of Europe about the way forward", calling in particular on all pro-European forces to be mobilised against the anti-European agenda of "the populists and the nationalists".

=== Jean-Claude Juncker ===
9 September 2015 marked the first address held by Jean-Claude Juncker. It was titled "Time for honesty, unity and solidarity" and opened with the "imperative to act as a union" in order to address the refugee crisis.

There is not enough Europe in this Union. And there is not enough Union in this Union.

Juncker used his 2017 State of the Union address to call for "a stronger single market".

Juncker’s 2018 speech was titled “The hour of European sovereignty”.

=== Ursula von der Leyen ===
In 2020, on Brexit, Ursula von der Leyen restated the withdrawal agreement is an agreed and ratified divorce agreement:

It (the agreement) cannot be unilaterally changed, disregarded or disciplined. This is a matter of law and trust and good faith.

Her 2021 address has been delivered on 15 September 2021:

Today, and against all critics, Europe is among the world leaders.

More than 70 per cent of adults in the EU are fully vaccinated. We were the only ones to share half of our vaccine production with the rest of the world. We delivered more than 700 million doses to the European people, and we delivered more than another 700 million doses to the rest of the world, to more than 130 countries. We are the only region in the world to achieve that.

A pandemic is a marathon, not a sprint.

— 2021 state of the Union address
