= Austrian Canadians =

Austrian Canadians Canadiens autrichiens Österreichischekanadier
Total population
- 189,535 (by ancestry, 2021 Census)

Regions with significant populations
- Montreal, Vancouver, Toronto, Edmonton, Calgary, Mississauga, Ottawa, Quebec City

Languages
- English • French • German

Religion
- Christianity · Judaism

Related ethnic groups
- German Canadians · Swiss Canadians · Luxembourgian Canadians · Belgian Canadians

Austrian Canadians (German: Österreichischekanadier, pronounced [ˈøːstɐraɪçɪʃɛkaˌnaːdi̯ɐ]) are Canadian citizens who are of Austrian ancestry or Austrian-born people who reside in Canada. According to the 2021 Census, there were 189,535 Canadians who claimed either full or partial Austrian ancestry.

Austrian Canadian communities can be found throughout the country but with a higher concentration mainly in Western Canada.

== History ==
Austrian Canadian Population History
Year	Pop.	±%
1901	10,947	—
1911	44,036	+302.3%
1921	107,671	+144.5%
1931	48,639	−54.8%
1941	37,715	−22.5%
1951	32,231	−14.5%
1961	106,535	+230.5%
1971	107,671	+1.1%
1981	40,630	−62.3%
1986	74,640	+83.7%
1991	93,915	+25.8%
1996	140,520	+49.6%
2001	147,585	+5.0%
2006	194,255	+31.6%
2011	197,990	+1.9%
2016	207,050	+4.6%
Source: Statistics Canada Note: 1981 Canadian census did not include multiple ethnic origin responses, thus population is an undercount.

In the 17th century, soldiers from Austria settled in New France. Numbers increased following the passing of the Staatsgrundgesetz (constitutional law) in 1867 which allowed free migration from Austria-Hungary for civilians. Emigration to Canada increased throughout the late 19th century and into the early 20th, until this was tightened in 1914 at the onset of World War I.Many immigrants from Austria-Hungary to Canada were interned and used for enslaved labour during World War I. Beginning in 1914, subjects of the Habsburg Crown, especially Ukrainian-speakers from Austrian Galicia, were placed in twenty-four internment camps across Canada, the last of which closed in 1920. Many Austrian Jews fled to Canada during the Holocaust.

== Demographics ==
Austrian Canadian population by province and territory in Canada in 2011:

Province or territory	Austrian Canadians	Percentage
Canada	197,990	
Ontario	68,785	0.05%
British Columbia	45,675	1.0%
Alberta	36,670	
Saskatchewan	18,600	
Manitoba	12,660	
Quebec	11,815	
Nova Scotia	1,835	
New Brunswick	805	
Yukon	395	
Newfoundland and Labrador	275	
Prince Edward Island	270	
Northwest Territories	185	
Nunavut	15	

== See also ==
- Austria–Canada relations
- Greg Holst, head coach
- European Canadians
- German Canadians
- Hungarian Canadians
- Swiss Canadians
