= Penticton Memorial Arena =

Hockey arena in British Columbia

Penticton Memorial Arena is a hockey arena and ice rink located in Penticton, British Columbia. The arena is notable for its status as a war memorial, its specialized wooden arch roof, and for hosting the Okanagan Hockey School and the senior Penticton Vees.

== Construction ==
The arena was built in 1951 at 273 Power Street and was the first artificial indoor ice rink in Penticton. Memorial Arena is dedicated towards local veterans and war dead. A metal plaque on the east wall of the main entrance of the arena marks its memorial status, recognized by the National Inventory of Canadian Military Memorials. Kenyon and Company, run by Penticton local Harold Kenyon and now known as Greyback Construction Ltd., received the contract for $226,777.77. William Karel Noppe, a Belgian-Canadian architect active across British Columbia, was hired as the architect.

== Architecture ==
Memorial Arena seats 2,212 people. The arena features a half barrel-shaped roof made of laminated wooden arches. The support beams of the arc are 146 feet long and at the time of construction, were the largest beams of its kind in North America. From 1994-1996 the arena was renovated including the additional reinforcement of the beams with steel, as they had begun to rot.

There are many notable elements of the arena's design that remained intact until at least 2006, according to the Penticton Register of Historic Places, including:

- The early use of glue laminated beams in the roof construction
- The large interior open span
- The original 1951 score clock

Memorial Arena is registered on the Penticton Heritage Registry and on the Canadian Register of Historic Places as of 2020.

== Uses and events ==
Memorial Arena has hosted a variety of sports including hockey, figure skating, training camps, dry floor activities and other entertainment. Several recreational leagues, including the Okanagan Hockey School and minor hockey teams use the space for B.C.-wide practices and games. Historically, Memorial Arena was home to the senior Penticton Vees hockey team, the 1955 Ice Hockey World Champions. At the roundabout outside of the arena there is a 10-metre-high stainless-steel sculpture dedicated to this 1955 Penticton Vees victory.

== Proposed future use ==
Since 2017 the future of Memorial Arena has been focused on repurposing or demolishing the space. As of October 2025, the City of Penticton has proposed to demolish the arena to use its land as a parking lot for a proposed complex of two NHL-sized hockey rinks. Rather than demolition, it has also been proposed that Memorial Arena be turned into a dry floor facility. The proposed dry floor facility plan may include spaces for volleyball, floor hockey, roller skating, basketball, pickleball, wheelchair sports, lacrosse and other community actives like holiday events, farmer’s markets, graduation parties and kids’ camps. By November 26, 2025, 630 people had signed an online petition to move forward with the conversion rather than demolish the building.
