= Belgian Canadians =

Canadians of Belgian ancestry

Total population
- 186,665 (by ancestry, 2016 Census)

Regions with significant populations
- Montreal, Toronto, Calgary, Vancouver, Edmonton, Winnipeg, Ottawa

Languages
- Canadian English · Canadian French · Flemish Dutch · Belgian French · German

Religion
- Christianity (Catholicism)

Related ethnic groups
- Dutch Canadians · French Canadians · German Canadians · Luxembourgish Canadians

Belgian Canadians (French: Canadiens belges; Dutch: Belgisch-canadezen) are Canadian citizens of Belgian ancestry or Belgium-born people who reside in Canada. According to the 2011 census there were 176,615 Canadians who claimed full or partial Belgian ancestry. It encompasses immigrants from both French and Dutch-speaking parts of Belgium.

== History ==
Belgian Canadian Population History
Year	Pop.	±%
1901	2,994	—
1911	9,664	+222.8%
1921	20,234	+109.4%
1931	27,585	+36.3%
1941	29,711	+7.7%
1951	35,148	+18.3%
1961	61,382	+74.6%
1971	51,135	−16.7%
1981	42,270	−17.3%
1986	74,795	+76.9%
1991	90,910	+21.5%
1996	123,595	+36.0%
2001	129,780	+5.0%
2006	168,915	+30.2%
2011	176,615	+4.6%
2016	186,665	+5.7%
Source: Statistics Canada Note: 1981 Canadian census did not include multiple ethnic origin responses, thus population is an undercount.

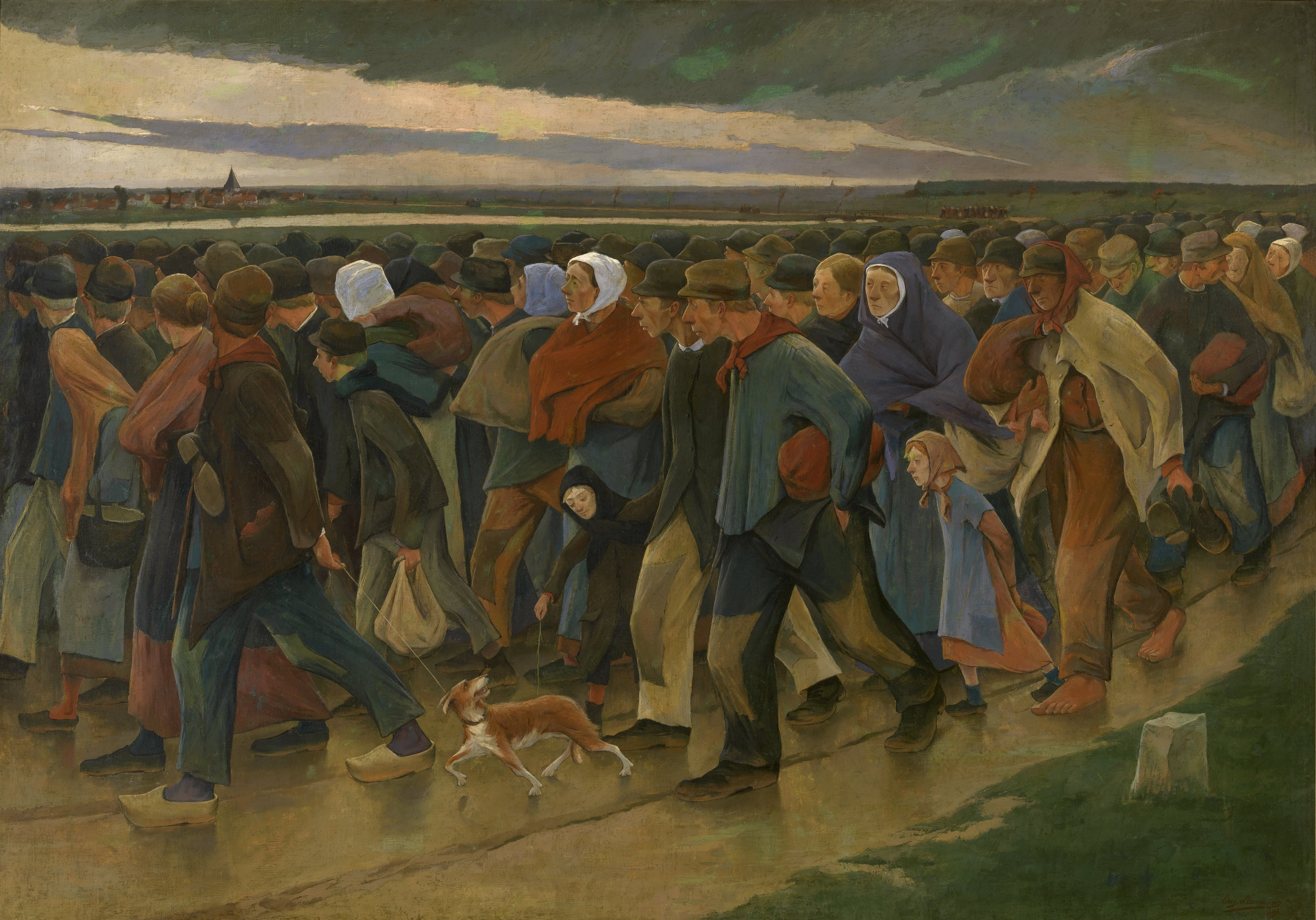
The Emigrants (1896) by the Belgian artist Eugène Laermans

People from the Southern Netherlands (present-day Belgium) first arrived in the 1660s. A trickle of artisans came to New France before the 1750s. In the mid-19th century there were enough arrivals to open part-time consulates in Montreal, Quebec City and Halifax. After 1859 the main attraction was free farm land. After 1867 the national government gave immigrants from Belgium preferred status, and encouraged emigration to the Francophone Catholic communities of Quebec and Manitoba. Édouard Simaeys became a part-time paid Canadian agent in Belgium to publicize opportunities in Canada and facilitate immigration. The steamship companies prepared their own brochures and offered package deals to farm families. By 1898 there was a full-time Canadian office in Antwerp which provided pamphlets, lectures and specific travel advice. By 1906 some 2,000 Belgians a year were arriving, most with skills in agriculture. A third wave of immigration took place after 1945, with urban areas the destination. The 1961 census counted 61,000 Canadians of Belgian ancestry.

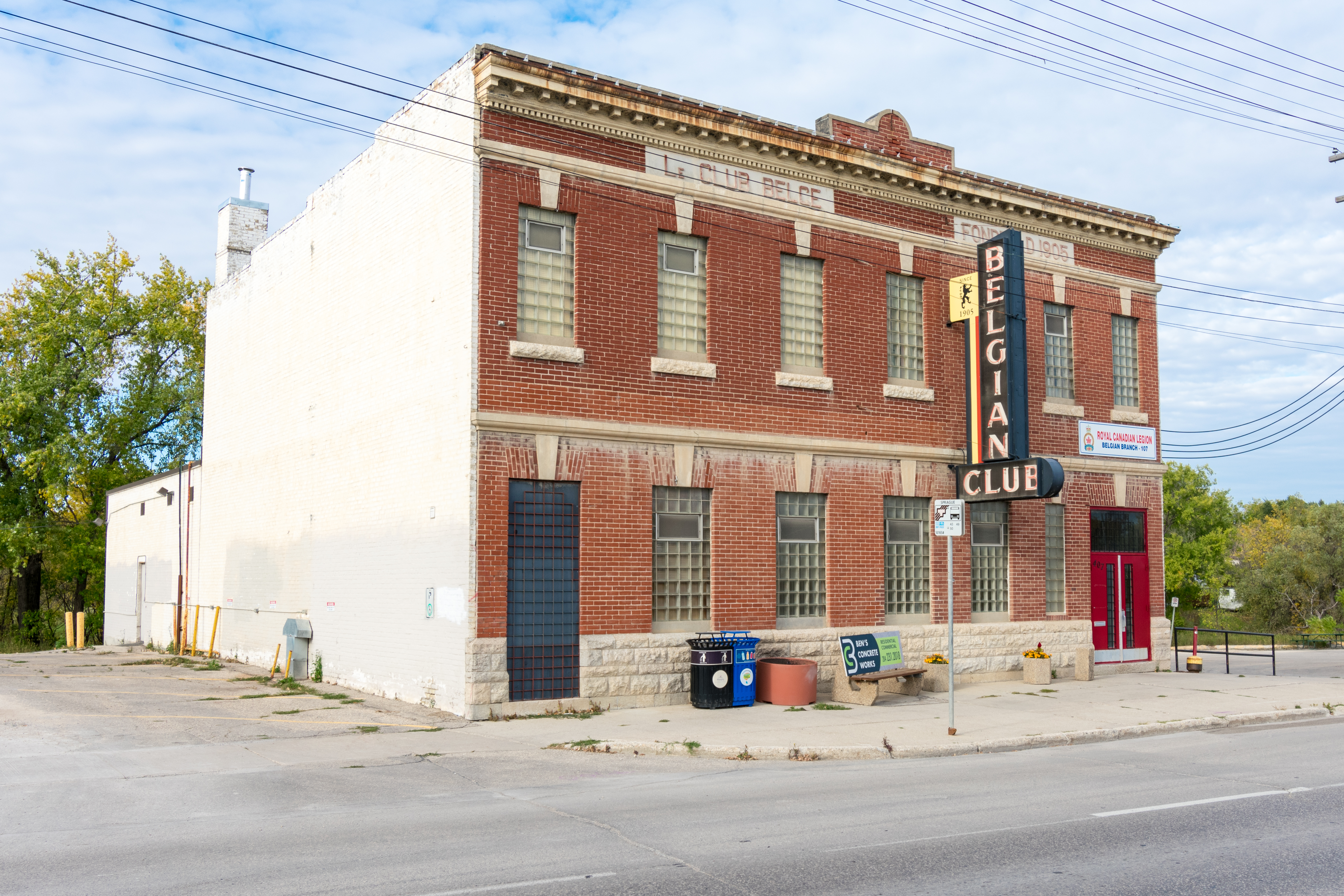
The Club Belge in Saint Boniface, Winnipeg, Manitoba founded in 1905

Belgian immigration to Western Canada in the late 19th and early 20th century attracted the attention of the Belgian government. It enacted laws and regulations to protect the emigrants and guarantee adequate travel conditions. Provision was made to assist emigrants who decided to return to Belgium. Starting in the 1860s consular officials made on-site visits to inspect conditions in Canada, which eagerly welcomed the new arrivals. The Catholic church was likewise welcoming, and a number of priests emigrated. The Walloon immigrants discovered they could continue to speak French in Canada, while the Flemish quickly learned English. The Belgians formed no national organizations but they were active in local affairs. Some settled in towns such as Saint Boniface, Manitoba, but most became farmers who specialized in dairy farming, sugar beets and market gardening. After 1920 there was a move to western Alberta, with an economy based on ranching, horse breeding, and sugar beets.

During the Second World War, Belgian émigrés from Canada and elsewhere in the Americas were formed into the 2nd Fusilier Battalion of the Free Belgian Forces, which was based in Canada.

== Demographics ==
=== Belgian Canadians by Canadian province or territory (2016) ===
Province	Population	Percentage	Source
Ontario	57,890	0.4%	
Quebec	51,340	0.7%	
Manitoba	21,515	1.7%	
Alberta	21,210	0.5%	
British Columbia	19,980	0.4%	
Saskatchewan	9,655	0.9%	
Nova Scotia	2,620	0.3%	
New Brunswick	1,465	0.2%	
Prince Edward Island	440	0.3%	
Newfoundland and Labrador	200	0.0%	
Yukon	170	0.5%	
Northwest Territories	145	0.4%	
Nunavut	30	0.1%	
Canada	186,665	0.5%	

== Notable people ==
- Maurice Baudoux (1902–1988), Belgian-born Catholic priest and Archbishop of Saint Boniface, Manitoba
- Johan Beetz (1874–1949), Belgian-born naturalist and namesake of Baie-Johan-Beetz, Quebec
- Robert Bockstael (1960–), actor
- Berthe Chaurès-Louard (1889–1968), Belgian-born Canadian businesswoman
- Will Cuylle (2002–), ice hockey player
- Danica d'Hondt (1939–), British-born actress
- Michael DeGroote (1933–2022), businessman and philanthropist
- Gustave Francq (1871–1952), Belgian-born printer and trade unionist
- Alain Goldschlager (1946–), professor at University of Western Ontario
- Émilie Heymans (1981–), Belgian-born Olympic diver
- Mark Jooris (1964–), ice hockey player
- Marcel Lambert (1919–2000), politician and Speaker of the House of Commons of Canada
- Alexis Nihon (1902–1980), Belgian-born industrialist
- Ludivine Reding (1997–), actress
- Lance Stroll (1998–), Formula One driver
- Chloe Van Landschoot (1993–), actress, director

== See also ==
- European Canadians
- Bruxelles, Manitoba
- Belgian Americans
- Gazette van Detroit (1914–2018)
- Belgium–Canada relations
- Dutch Canadians
- French Canadians
- German Canadians
- Luxembourgish Canadians
- Red Star Line
