= Isabelle Blume =

Belgian politician (1892–1975)

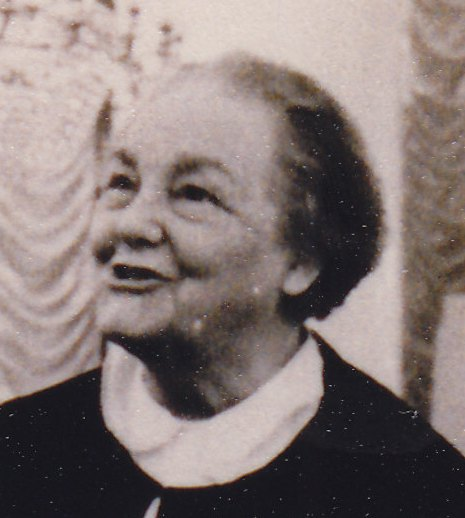
- Born: 22 April 1892; Baudour, Hainaut Province, Belgium
- Died: 12 March 1975 (aged 82)

Isabelle Blume (née Grégoire; 22 April 1892 – 12 March 1975) was a Belgian left wing politician and teacher. She was awarded the International Stalin Prize for Strengthening Peace Among Peoples (later renamed the Lenin Peace Prize) in 1953.

Her grandson is professor and Shoah historian, Alain Goldschlager.

== Life ==
Isabelle Grégoire was born in Baudour in Belgium in 1892 and first qualified as a teacher in 1911 in Liège. She then studied theology in Geneva. Her father had been a pastor and in 1913 she married a pastor named David Blume. Her husband became the Director General of the Belgian Public Libraries. They had three children.

Blume was political being both opposed to fascism and a feminist and she joined the Belgian Labour Party in 1918. She was active on the question of women's suffrage and their rights in general. In 1936 she was elected to the Chamber of Representatives to represent Brussels. During the war she was active in London.

In 1951 she attended the World Peace Council. She was awarded the International Stalin Prize for Strengthening Peace Among Peoples in 1953. She attended the Second World Congress of Champions of Peace and as result she was expelled from the Belgian Socialist Party in 1961. She remained as an independent in parliament after leaving the socialists. In 1961 she joined the Communist Party of Belgium serving on their Central Committee in 1966. She was President from 1966 to 1969 and this role introduced her to leading world figures including Indira Gandhi, Mao Zedong and Ho Chi Minh.

She died in 1975. She has three children including Jean Blume who is a journalist and politician. Her grandchildren include Alain Goldschlager a Canadian academic. Goldschlager was awarded the Knight of the Order of Academic Palms in 2014 for his support of the French language and he cites his grandfather David Blume who took a leading role in establishing libraries in Belgium, with inspiring his love of French.
