= Austria–Canada relations =

Bilateral relations between the Republic of Austria and Canada

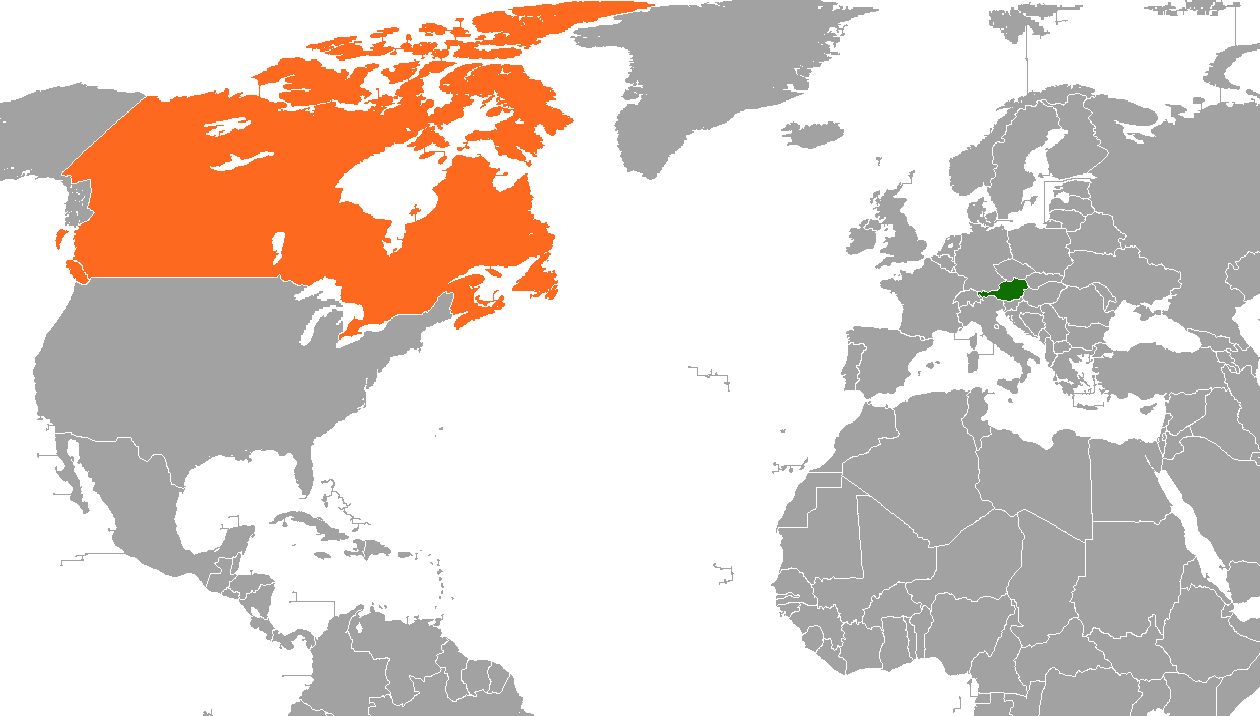

- Austria: Canada

Diplomatic relations between Austria and Canada centres on the history of Austrian migration to Canada. Approximately 200,000 Canadians have Austrian ancestry. Both nations are members of the OECD and the United Nations.

== History ==
In 1855, the Austro-Hungarian Empire opened a consulate in Halifax. The first large wave of Austrian migrants to arrive to Canada occurred in the early 20th century. In 1902, a consulate was established in Montreal. During World War I, both nations fought on opposing sides and confronted each other primarily in France during the Hundred Days Offensive. After Austria's annexation by Germany (Anschluss) several Austrian refugees immigrated to Canada.

Soon after World War II, Austria opened a consulate-general in Ottawa in 1949. In 1952, Austria and Canada officially established diplomatic relations and in 1958 Austria opened a resident embassy in Ottawa.

Relations between both nations follow their mutual commitment to multilateralism, trade and investment and increasing people-to-people ties. There have been several visits between leaders of both nations.

In 2022, both nations celebrated 70 years of diplomatic relations.

== Bilateral relations ==
Both nations have signed several bilateral agreements such as an Agreement for the Avoidance of Double Taxation and the Prevention of Fiscal Evasion with Respect to Taxes on Income and on Capital (1976); Agreement on Social Security (1987); Extradition treaty (2000); and an Agreement for a Working Holiday Program (2018).

== Transport ==
There are direct flights between both nations with Air Canada and Austrian Airlines.

== Trade ==
In October 2016, Canada and the European Union (which includes Austria) signed a free trade agreement known as the "Comprehensive Economic and Trade Agreement". In 2018, trade between Austria and Canada totaled $2.3 billion. Austria's main exports to Canada include: machinery and equipment, and pharmaceutical based products. Canada's main exports to Austria include: aircraft products, machinery and vehicles.

== Resident diplomatic missions ==
- Austria has an embassy in Ottawa.
- Canada has an embassy in Vienna.
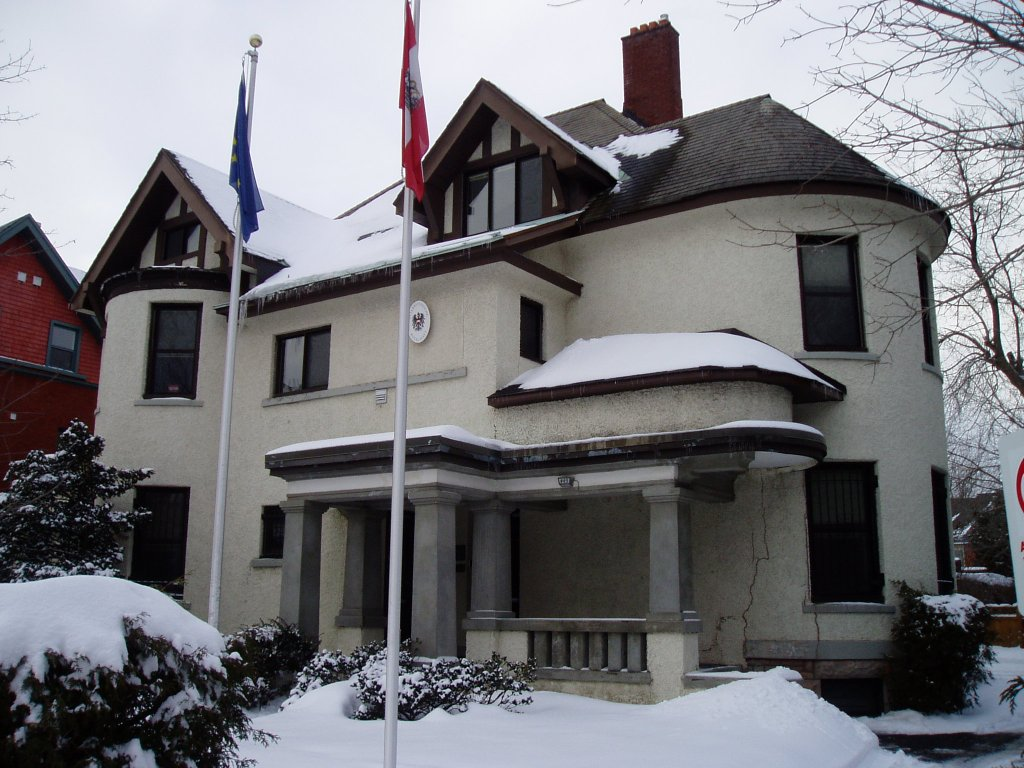
Embassy of Austria in Ottawa

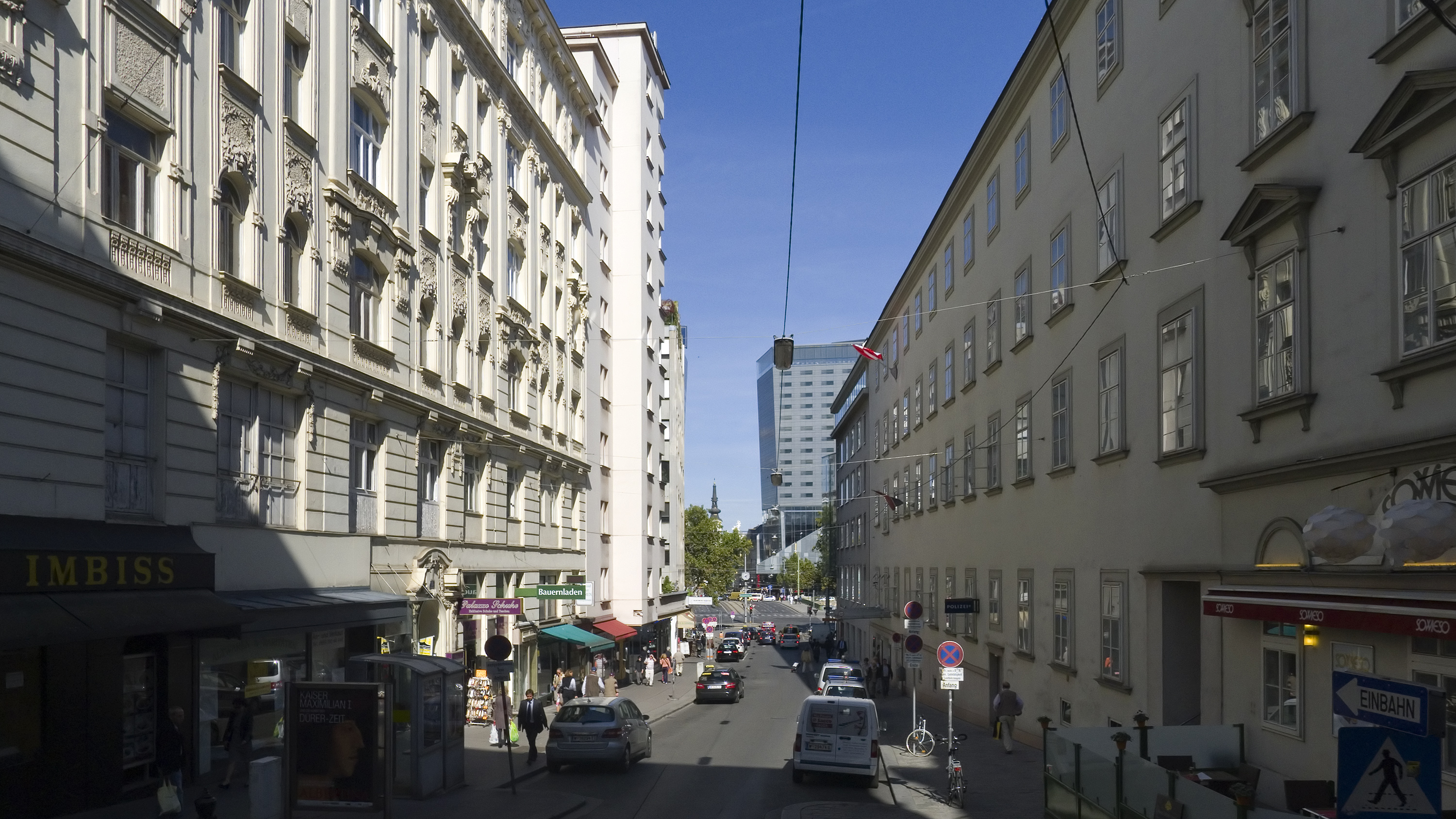
Embassy of Canada in Vienna

== See also ==
- Foreign relations of Austria
- Foreign relations of Canada
- Austrian Canadians
- Canada–European Union relations
