= Luxembourgish Canadians =

Luxembourgish Canadians Luxembourgeois-canadiennes Luxemburgischkanadier
Total population
- 3,915 (by ancestry, 2016 Census)

Regions with significant populations
- Ontario: 955
- Quebec: 720
- British Columbia: 715

Languages
- Luxembourgish · German · English · French

Religion
- Christianity

Related ethnic groups
- Belgian Canadians · French Canadians · German Canadians · Dutch Canadians · Swiss Canadians

Luxembourgish Canadians are Canadian citizens of Luxembourgish descent or Luxembourg-born people who reside in Canada. According to the 2016 Census there were 3,915 Canadians who claimed full or partial Luxembourgish ancestry.

Luxembourgish immigration to Canada has not been as significant as those from other parts of Europe but there is a considerable community from Luxembourg in Canada. Despite this, the North American country is home to one of the largest Luxembourgish communities in the world and the fourth largest in the Americas, only behind the United States, Brazil, and Argentina.

== Relations between Luxembourg and Canada ==
There had always been strong relations between the two countries but it was not until the outbreak of the Second World War when both came together even more.

Canada opened its doors to thousands of immigrants, including Luxembourgers. But some of the most notable Luxembourgers who arrived in Canada were the Grand Duke's family who came to Montreal, Quebec as refugees after the German invasion of Luxembourg on May 10, 1940. Since then, Canada and Luxembourg have developed a partnership which encompasses shared values and an ongoing political dialogue on major international issues.

Both countries are members of La Francophonie and NATO.

== See also ==
- Canada-Luxembourg relations
- European Canadians
- Luxembourgish Americans
- Belgian Canadians
- Dutch Canadians
- French Canadians
- German Canadians
