= German International School Toronto =

Private school in Toronto, Ontario, Canada

Coordinates: 43.6590°N 79.4355°W

The German International School Toronto (GIST, German: Deutsche Internationale Schule Toronto) is a German private school in Toronto, Ontario. The school offers grades from Pre-Kindergarten through Grade 12. GIST is an International Baccalaureate (IB) World School, offering the Diploma Programme for Grades 11 and 12. It provides an international outlook for students of all nationalities aspiring to be global citizens, focusing on a rich linguistic environment in German, English, and French.

== Campus ==
In August 2020, the school moved to its new location on 25 Burnhamthorpe Rd in Etobicoke, renting from the Islington United Church.

== See also ==
- Canadians of German ethnicity
