= Canada–Switzerland relations =

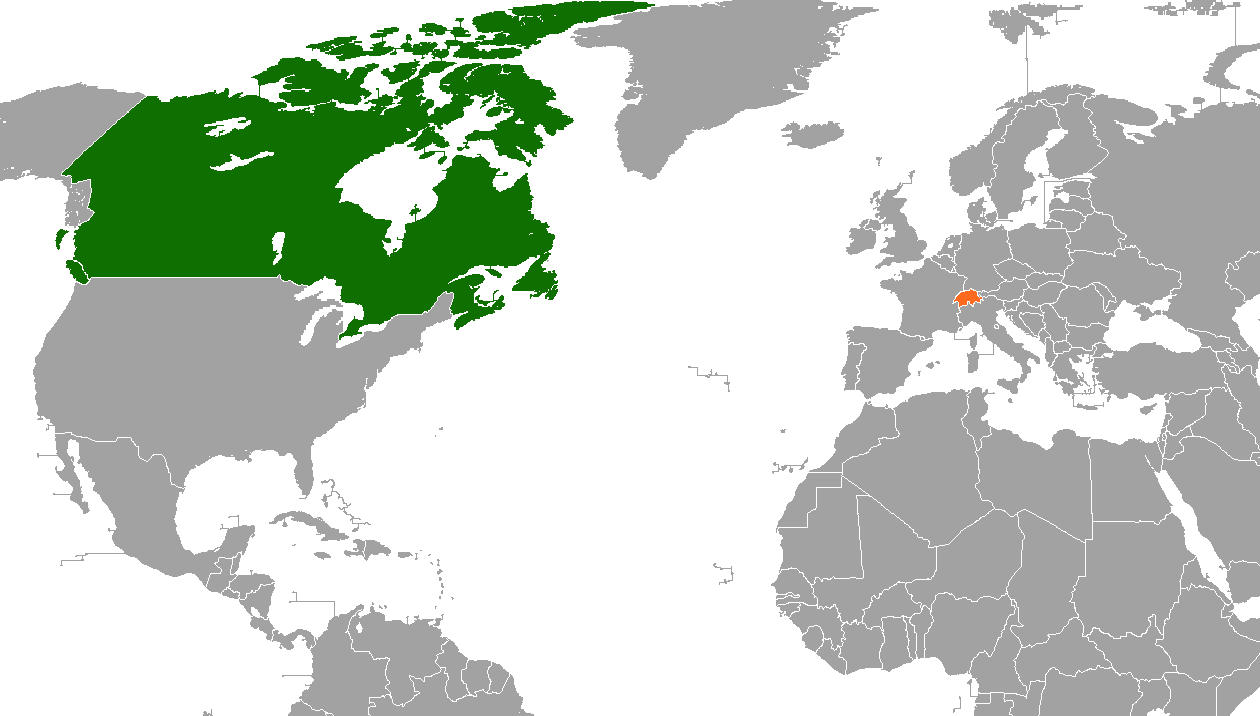

- Canada: Switzerland

Canada–Switzerland relations refers to the bilateral ties between Canada and the Swiss Confederation, based on diplomatic cooperation, economic and commercial exchanges, and shared values such as support for democracy, human rights, and the rules-based international order. Switzerland maintains an embassy in Ottawa and consulates general in Montréal and Vancouver, while Canada has an embassy in Bern and a permanent mission to the World Trade Organization (WTO) and the United Nations (UN) in Geneva.

The two countries cooperate in areas including trade, science and technology, and international governance. Canada hosts a significant Swiss diaspora, and both nations work closely together in multilateral forums such as the WTO, the UN, La Francophonie, and other international organizations.

== History ==
In 1604, during the colonization of Canada, Swiss soldiers in the service of the French army arrived to the territory of New France. Since the initial arrival, Canada has been a destination for Swiss emigrants. Switzerland's first honorary consulates in Canada were established in Montreal (1875), Toronto (1906), Vancouver and Winnipeg (1913). The two countries established diplomatic relations in 1945. In 1945, Switzerland opened a diplomatic legation in Ottawa and elevated it to an embassy in 1957. That same year, Canada upgraded its diplomatic legation in Bern to an embassy. On November 23, 2022, Governor General Mary Simon received Kjelsen's credentials. On September 18, 2025, Swiss President Karin Keller-Sutter received Lemieux's credentials.

== Bilateral agreements ==
Both nations have signed several bilateral agreement such as a Treaty of Friendship, Commerce and Reciprocal Establishment (1914); Air Transport Agreement (1976); Cinematographic and Audiovisual Relations Agreement (1988); Cooperation Agreement for the Peaceful Uses of Nuclear Energy (1989); Mutual legal assistance treaty in criminal matters (1995); Social security convention, with arrangements with Quebec (1995); Extradition treaty (1996); and a Double taxation agreement (1998).

== Resident diplomatic missions ==
of Canada in Switzerland

- Bern (Embassy)

of Switzerland in Canada

- Ottawa (Embassy)
- Montreal (Consulate-General)
- Vancouver (Consulate-General, located in Suite 790, at the World Trade Centre of Canada Place)

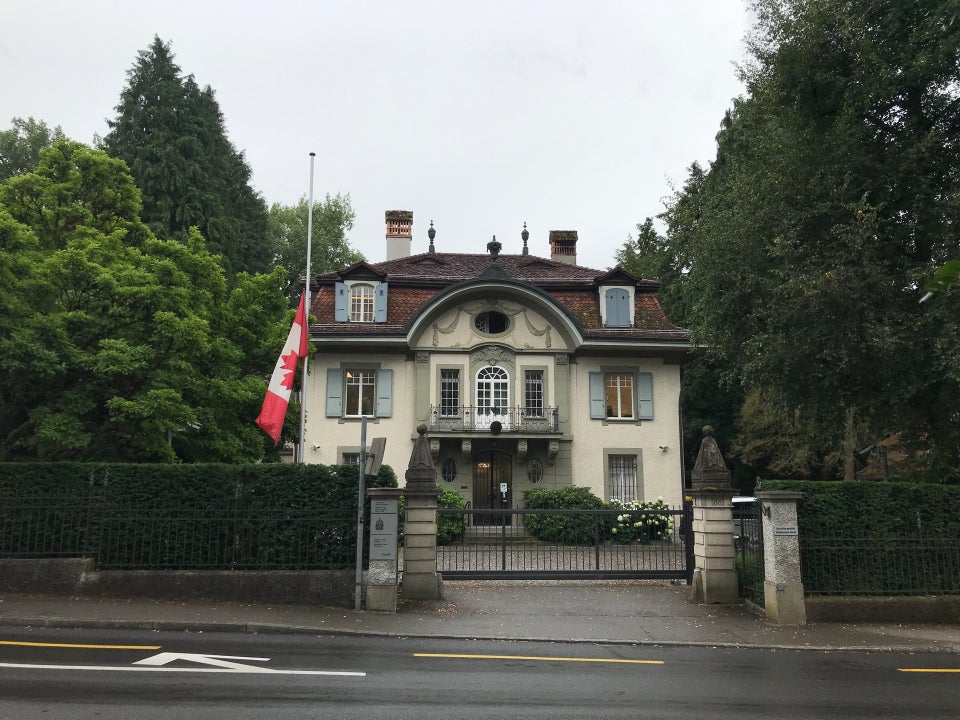
Embassy of Canada in Bern

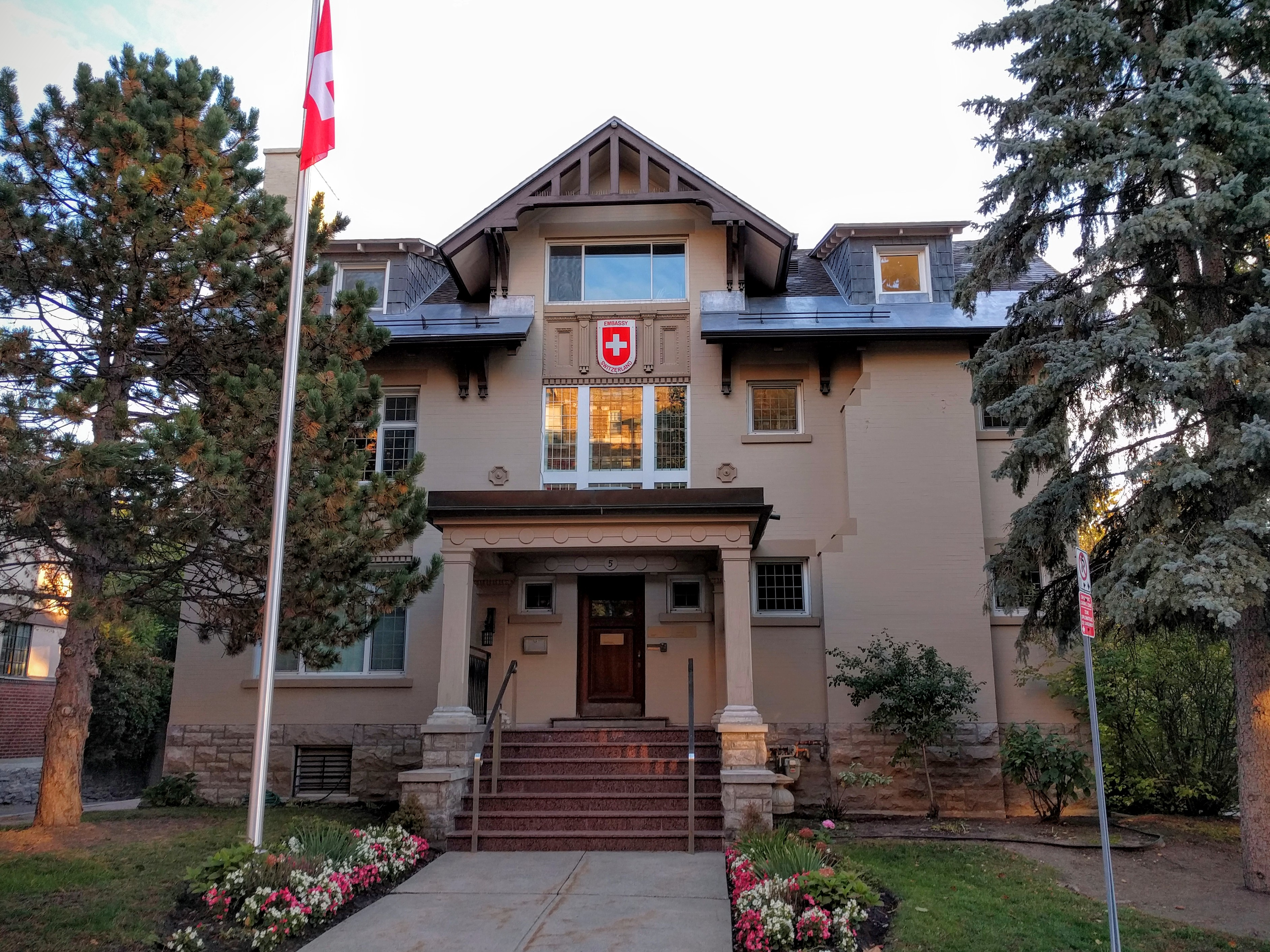
Embassy of Switzerland in Ottawa

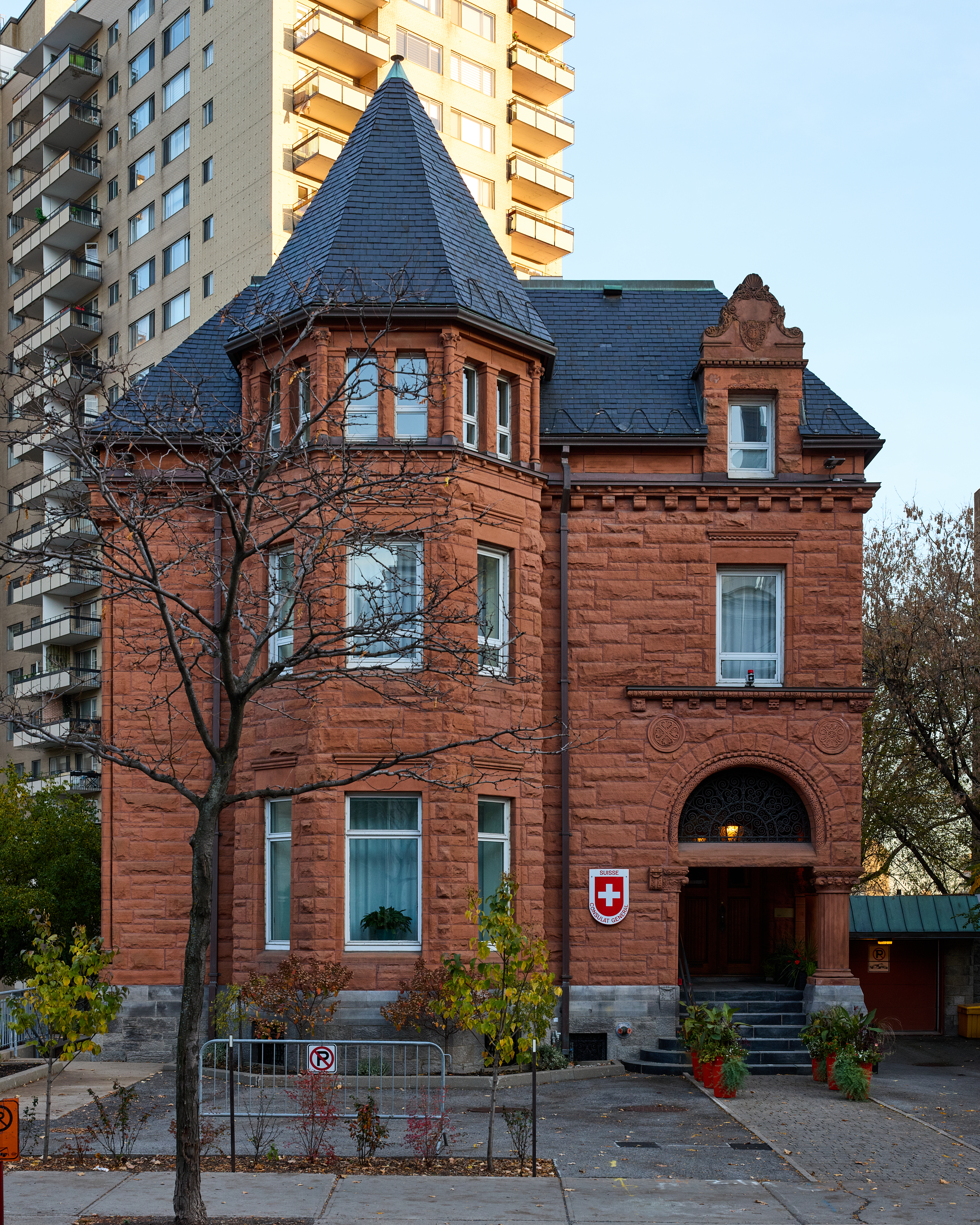
Consulate-General of Switzerland in Montreal

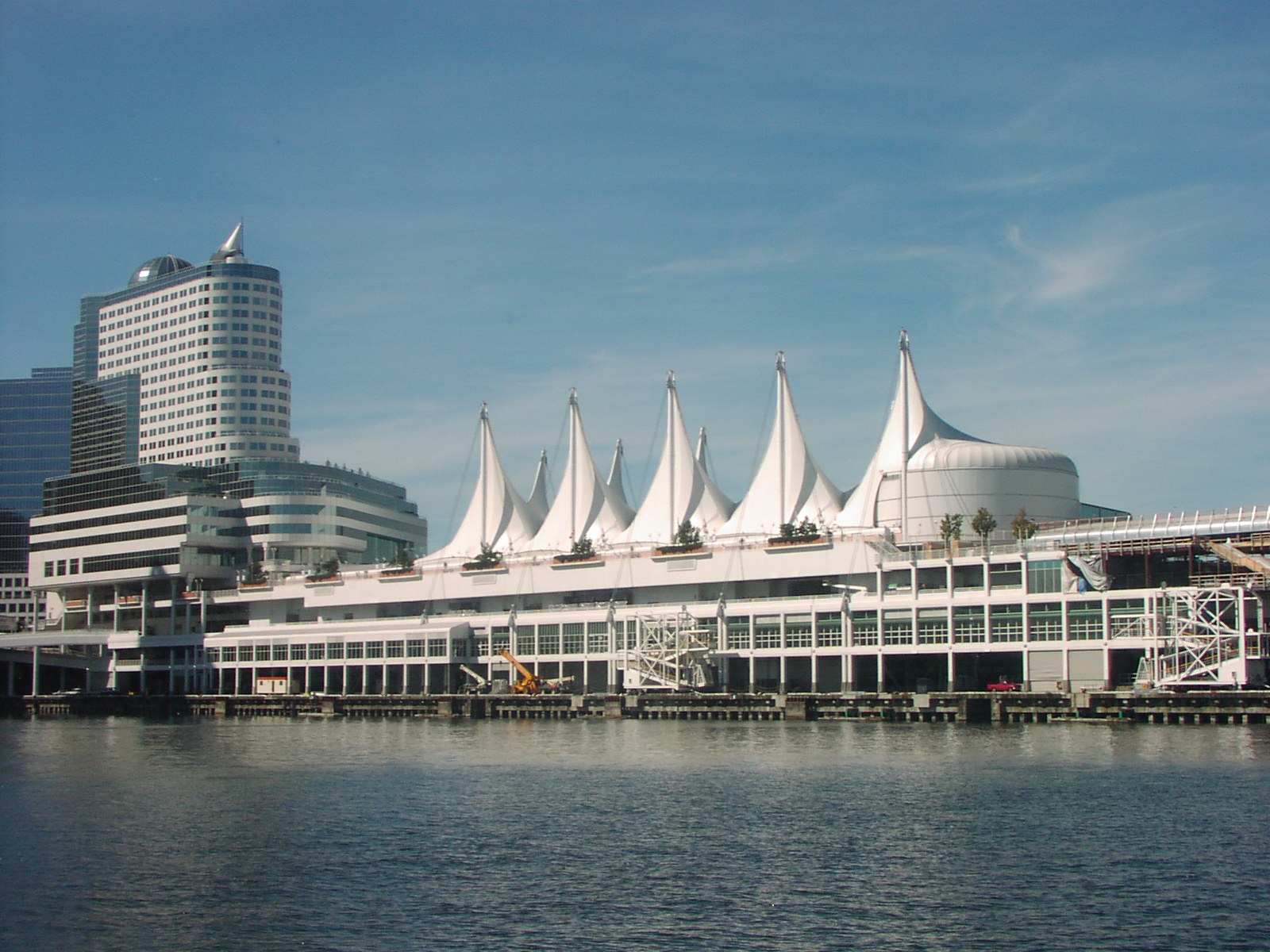
Consulate-General of Switzerland in Vancouver

== See also ==
- Swiss Canadians
