= Berthe Chaurès-Louard =

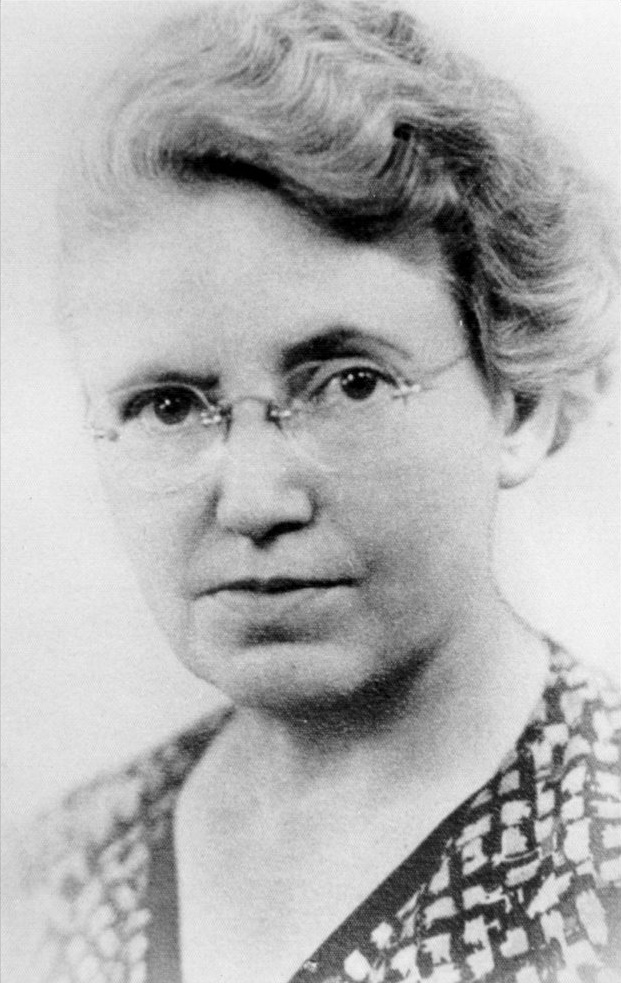
- Berthe Chaures-Louard in 1945
- Born: Berthe Scharès; October 2, 1889; Limburg, Belgium
- Died: February 7, 1968 (aged 78); Montréal, Canada
- Education: Université de Montréal

Berthe Chaurès-Louard (née Scharès; October 2, 1889 – February 7, 1968) was a Belgian-born Canadian businesswoman. She is considered the founder of the first French-Canadian consumer cooperative in Québec, La Familiale, in 1937.

== Biography ==
=== Birth and education ===
She was born on October 2, 1889 in Limbourg, Belgium. She has held an honorary doctorate in social sciences from the University of Montreal since 1947.

=== Professional career and commitment ===
Arriving in Quebec with her husband, Édouard Louard, shortly after the First World War she dedicated herself to the cooperative system she had known in her country. In 1937, she founded the first food cooperative in Quebec, La Familiale. She managed its three branches (located successively on rue Notre-Dame, and rue Saint-Hubert) which would give life to the Cooprix stores in the 1960s. To bring her project to fruition, she had rallied the economist François-Albert Angers to her ideas and the man of letters Victor Barbeau, co-founders with her.

From La Familiale, Berthe Louard set up a network of works: in 1939, the Family Guild; in 1940, the Study Circles; and for young people, L'École des loisirs, as well as holiday camps.

To help promote her ideal, she gave numerous conferences throughout the province and in 1940 launched a periodical, Le Coopérateur. In 1949, she was awarded the Mérite coopératif by the Conseil québécois de la coopération du Québec.

In the 1950s, she developed the St-Sulpice estate in Montreal, a corporate model for modest families.

In 1954, she established a housing committee for La Familiale, whose goal was to enable low-income families to access land ownership at an affordable price. This came to fruition in September 1962 at the Domaine Saint-Sulpice.

An active feminist, Berthe Louard was a delegate to the Fiftieth Anniversary Congress of the World Union of Women's Organizations in Rome in 1961 and participated in the Domestic Economic Congress of the Province of Quebec in 1962.

In 1967, she bequeathed her residence to the Family Guild. Now transferred to the Fabrique Saint-Isaac-Jogues, the Berthe-Louard Community House is used for the same purposes.

=== Death ===
Berthe Chaurès-Louard died in Montreal in 1968.

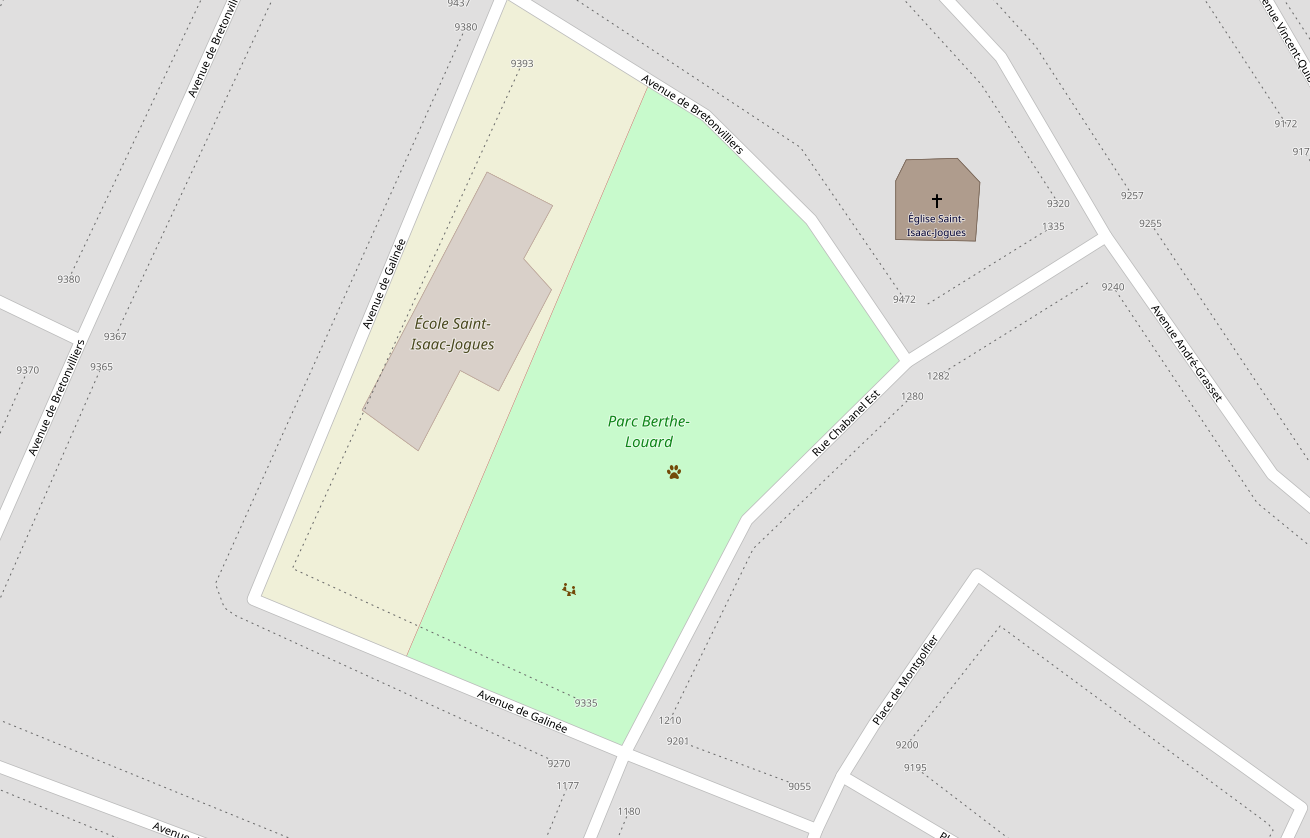
Map of Berthe-Louard Park, Montreal

In 1970, Victor Barbeau wrote his work, Hommage à Berthe Chaurès Louard 1889-1968, upon his merit as an officer of the Order of Canada. She is considered the founder of the first French-Canadian consumer cooperative. On March 13, 2013, the City of Montreal awarded her the title of Builder of the City. Her ideal survived her, notably among the residents of the Domaine Saint-Sulpice where a street, a park in Ahuntsic-Cartierville, a housing cooperative bear her name. Since 2007, a public artwork of the Montreal artist Linda Covit, Les graminées du jardin Saint-Sulpice, erected at the initiative of the Berthe-Louard Recognition Committee, bears witness to her work right near her residence.

== Bibliography ==
- Sous la direction de Diane Archambault-Malouin, Une belle histoire qui se poursuit... Collection: Le Domaine, 2002-2012, Les Services du Domaine et Caisse populaire Desjardins Domaine Saint-Sulpice
