= Swiss Canadians =

Swiss Canadians Schweiz-Kanadier 'Suisse-Canadiens 'Svizzero-canadesi
Total population
- 155,120 (by ancestry, 2016 Census)

Regions with significant populations
- Quebec City, Montreal, Ottawa, Toronto, Edmonton, Saskatoon, Calgary, Vancouver, Winnipeg

Languages
- English · French · German · Italian

Religion
- Christianity (Catholicism, Anabaptism (Amish, Mennonite, Hutterite))

Related ethnic groups
- German Canadians · French Canadians · Italian Canadians

Swiss Canadians are Canadian citizens of Swiss ancestry or people who emigrated from Switzerland and reside in Canada. According to the 2016 Census there were 155,120 Canadians who claimed Swiss ancestry, having an increase compared to those 146,830 in the 2011 Census.

One of the earliest settlers in Canada was Pierre Miville (d. 1669). Laurenz Ermatinger (1736 to 1789), a fur trader and merchant, arrived in Montreal from Switzerland and together with his son Charles Oakes (1776 to 1833), and Sebastian Freyvogel have explored the large Huron tract. Many Swiss arrived in North America as part of the Swiss mercenaries, some of which later settled in Canada. One of these soldiers was Frederick Haldimand, who served in the British Army in North America during the Seven Years' War and the American Revolutionary War. From 1778 to 1786, he served as Governor of the Province of Quebec.

Another group of Swiss emigrants were Mennonites who originally settled in Pennsylvania and were descendants of Swiss Anabaptists. In 1786, a group of these Mennonites (led by John, Thielman and Steffen Kolb as well as Franklin Albrecht and Frederich Hahn) settled in the Niagara Region, close to the Twenty Mile Creek. Another colony was founded by David Hoover on the north shore of Lake Erie in 1792. Abraham Erb who founded Waterloo, was a Mennonite of Swiss ancestry from Pennsylvania. Similarly, Benjamin Eby immigrated to Upper Canada in 1806 and purchased a large tract of land in what would later become Kitchener, Ontario.

By 1871 about 3,000 Swiss had settled in Canada and in the time between 1887 and 1938, a reported additional 8,548 Swiss had moved to Canada. With the passing of the Free Grants and Homestead Act in 1868, large areas of land became available for settlement. In 1973, a group of Swiss immigrants arrived in the Nipissing region, led by Elise von Koerber. Peter Rindisbacher was a Swiss artist who specialized in painting the Western USA and Canada until his death in 1834.

Until WWII, most Swiss immigrants were farmers who settled in Canada. This changed after WWII, when several Swiss firms opened offices in Canada, leading to immigration of educated Swiss personnel including engineers, professors and merchants. When farmland became unaffordable in Switzerland in the 1970s, a number of Swiss farmers bought farmland in Canada and settled there. In the 1990s, rising unemployment in Switzerland led to another wave of emigration.

== Swiss Canadians by numbers ==
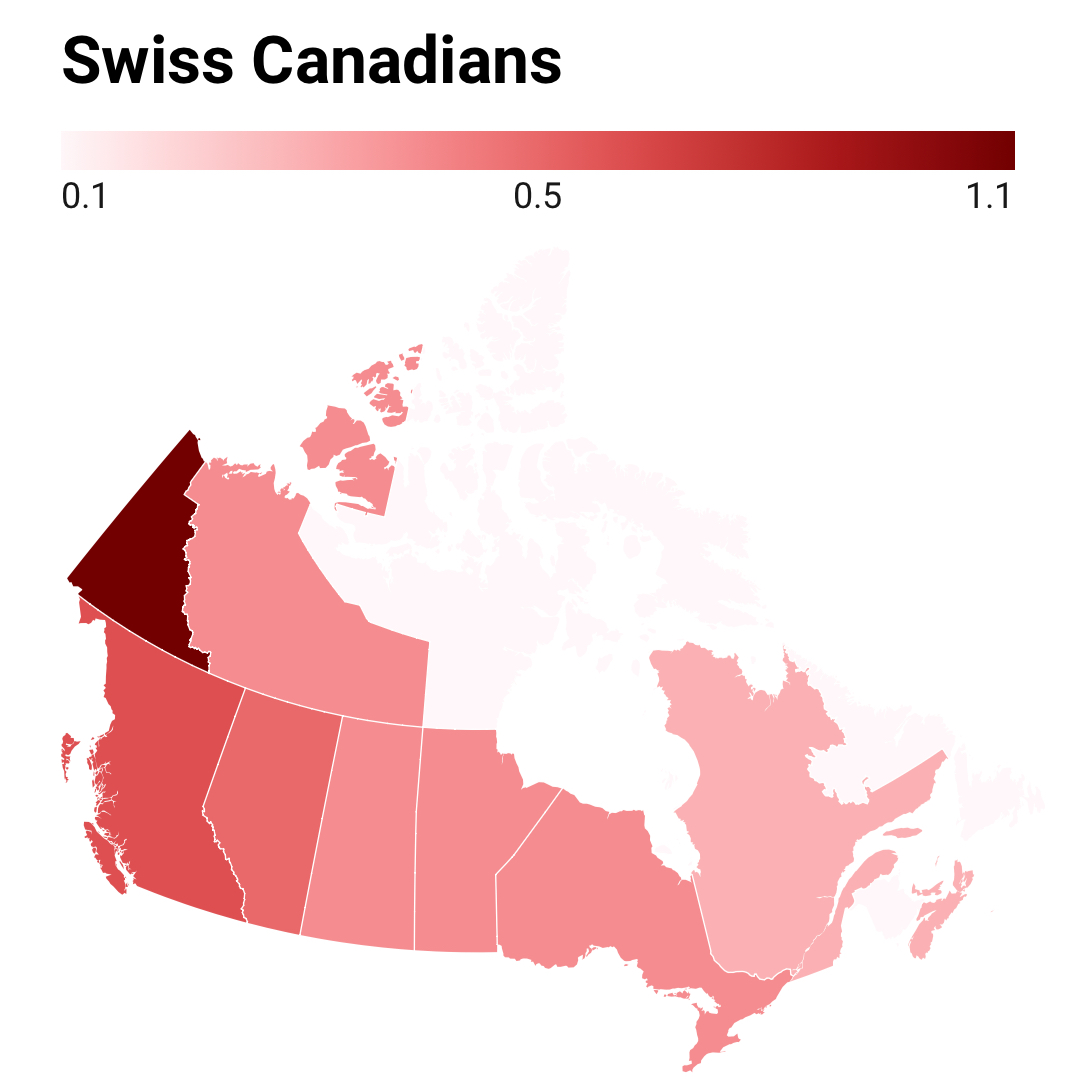
Swiss percent in Canadian provinces/territories, 2021 census

According to the 2011 National Household Survey, the cities with the most people claiming Swiss ethnic origin are as follow:

1. Toronto, Ontario – 13,455
2. Montreal, Quebec – 12,165
3. Vancouver, British Columbia – 11,405
4. Calgary, Alberta – 6,895
5. Edmonton, Alberta – 5,895
6. Ottawa, Ontario – 4,600
7. Winnipeg, Manitoba – 3,060
8. Hamilton, Ontario – 2,630
9. Quebec City, Quebec – 1,530
10. Saskatoon, Saskatchewan – 1,150

According to the 2011 National Household Survey, the provinces and territories with the most people claiming Swiss ethnic origin are as follow:

1. Ontario – 57,270
2. British Columbia – 29,705
3. Alberta – 23,020
4. Quebec – 22,065
5. Manitoba – 5,690
6. Saskatchewan – 4,420
7. Nova Scotia – 2,759
8. New Brunswick – 1,040
9. Yukon – 380
10. Prince Edward Island – 205

== See also ==
- Canada–Switzerland relations
- European Canadians
- Swiss Americans
- Austrian Canadians
- French Canadians
- German Canadians
- Italian Canadians
