= German Canadians =

Canadians of German ancestry

German Canadians Germano-Canadiens
Deutschkanadier, Deutsch-Kanadier, Düütschkanadier
- German Canadians as percent of population by census division (2021)

Total population
- 3,400,000; 10% of the total Canadian population

Regions with significant populations
- Western Canada, Ontario (Waterloo Region), Atlantic Canada, Quebec

Languages
- English • French • German • Low German

Religion
- Protestantism • Catholicism • Judaism

Related ethnic groups
- Other Germans, Austrian Canadians, Swiss Canadians, Luxembourgish Canadians, Latvian Canadians

German Canadians (German: Deutschkanadier or Deutsch-Kanadier, pronounced [ˈdɔʏtʃkaˌnaːdi̯ɐ]) (Low German:Düütschkanadääsk) are Canadian citizens of German ancestry or Germans who emigrated to and reside in Canada. According to the 2021 census, there are 2,955,695 Canadians with full or partial German ancestry. Some immigrants came from what is today Germany, while larger numbers came from German settlements in Eastern Europe and Imperial Russia; others came from parts of the German Confederation, Austria-Hungary and Switzerland.

== History ==
German Canadian Population History
| Year | Pop. | ±% |
|---|---|---|
| 1871 | 202,991 | — |
| 1881 | 254,319 | +25.3% |
| 1901 | 310,501 | +22.1% |
| 1911 | 403,417 | +29.9% |
| 1921 | 294,635 | −27.0% |
| 1931 | 473,544 | +60.7% |
| 1941 | 464,682 | −1.9% |
| 1951 | 619,995 | +33.4% |
| 1961 | 1,049,599 | +69.3% |
| 1971 | 1,317,200 | +25.5% |
| 1981 | 1,142,365 | −13.3% |
| 1986 | 2,467,055 | +116.0% |
| 1991 | 2,793,780 | +13.2% |
| 1996 | 2,757,140 | −1.3% |
| 2001 | 2,742,765 | −0.5% |
| 2006 | 3,179,425 | +15.9% |
| 2011 | 3,203,330 | +0.8% |
| 2016 | 3,322,405 | +3.7% |
Source: Statistics Canada Note1: 1981 Canadian census did not include multiple ethnic origin responses, thus population is an undercount. Note2: 1996-present census populations are undercounts, due to the creation of the "Canadian" ethnic origin category.

=== Historiography of Germans in Canada ===
In modern German, the endonym Deutsch is used in reference to the German language and people. Before the modern era and especially the unification of Germany, "Germany" and "Germans" were ambiguous terms which could at times encompass peoples and territories not only in the modern state of Germany, but also modern-day Poland, the Czech Republic, Switzerland, Austria, France, the Netherlands, and even Russia and Ukraine. For example, in the Middle Ages, the Latin term Theodiscus was used to refer to West Germanic languages in general, and in English, "Dutch" was sometimes used as a shorthand for any broadly Germanic people. Early Anglophone historians and contemporary travellers in Canada rarely mentioned the ethnic identity, primary language, or place of origin of early settlers at all, and even later historians in the 19th and 20th centuries were prone to using ambiguous terms such as "Pennsylvania Dutch". This term is sometimes described as a "misnomer" for Germans, but in its usage by English colonial authorities, "Dutch" was often an umbrella term which included people whose Germanic ancestry was in regions as widely separated as Switzerland, the Palatinate (and broader Rhineland), and Holland.

=== Early history ===
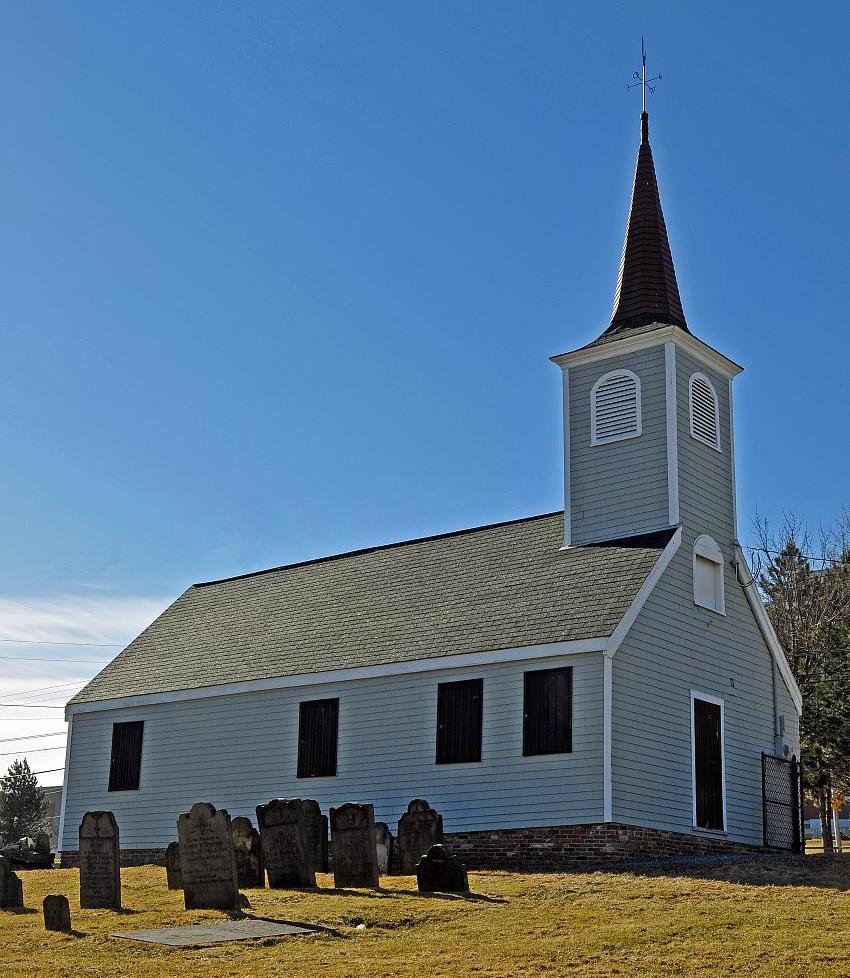
Little Dutch (Deutsch) Church - oldest German church in Canada (1756), Halifax, Nova Scotia

A few Germans came to New France when France colonized the area, but large-scale migration from Germany began only under British rule, when Governor Edward Cornwallis established Halifax, Nova Scotia in 1749. Known as the Foreign Protestants, the continental Protestants were encouraged to migrate to Nova Scotia between 1750 and 1752 to counterbalance the large number of Catholic Acadians. Family surnames, Lutheran churches, and village names along the South Shore of Nova Scotia retain their German heritage, such as Lunenburg. The first German church in Canada, the Little Dutch (Deutsch) Church in Halifax, is on land which was set aside for the German-speaking community in 1756. The church was designated a National Historic Site of Canada in 1997.

==== Loyalist migration ====
In the late 18th century, British colonies in North America were significantly affected by the outbreak and subsequent loss of the American Revolutionary War. At the time, Great Britain and its overseas empire were ruled by the German-descended King George III, who was also the Prince-Elector of Hanover, a state in what is now northwestern Germany. Thousands of soldiers fighting for the British were members of regiments hired from various small German states. These soldiers were collectively known as "Hessians", since many of them came from Hesse. Following the defeat of British forces, about 2,200 of them settled in Canada once their terms of service had expired or they had been released from American captivity. For example, a group from the Brunswick Regiment settled southwest of Montreal and south of Quebec City. In this, they formed part of a larger population movement composed of several waves of migration northward from the newly-founded United States to Upper and Lower Canada. In traditional Canadian historiography, these migrants are often grouped together under the broad label of United Empire Loyalists, obscuring particular ethnic and religious identities, as well as their exact motivations for migrating to Canada.

Another broad grouping of migrants were religious nonconformists, such as Quakers, Mennonites, and "Dunkers", who preferred British rule for religious reasons. These groups were formed on the basis of belief rather than ethnicity, but a number had their origin in Germany or in ethnic German communities in places such as Pennsylvania. These people are sometimes referred to by the Anglicized term "Pennsylvania Dutch", which derives from the endonym Pennsilfaanisch Deitsch. This term has led to their confusion with modern-day Dutch people. For this reason, some historiographers such as George Elmore Reaman use the term "Pennsylvania German", in order to distinguish them from migrants originating in Holland. Another complicating factor in assigning definite ethnic identities or origins to many migrants is that a number spent sometimes as long as several generations living in intermediary places such as Pennsylvania, New York, Holland, or England, despite an ultimate origin in Germany. One example is the Irish Palatines, who originated in the Palatinate (today a part of Germany) but had been settled for a time in Ireland by the British Crown.

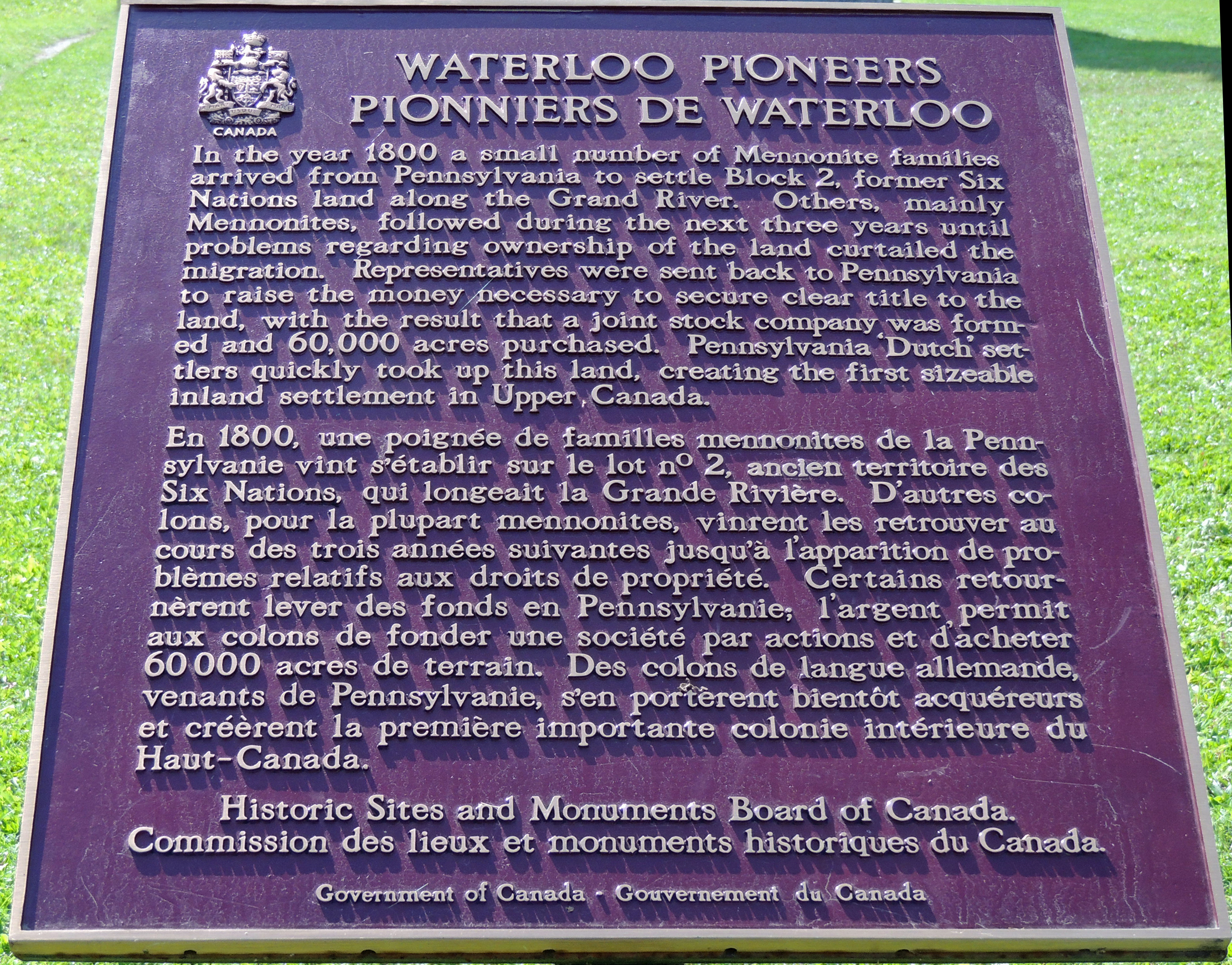
The Waterloo Pioneer Tower honours the Mennonite Germans who helped populate Waterloo County.

The largest group fleeing the United States was the Mennonites. Many of their families' ancestors had been from southern Germany or Switzerland. In the early 1800s, they began to move to what is now southwestern Ontario and settled around the Grand River, especially in Berlin, Ontario (now Kitchener) and in the northern part of what later became Waterloo County, Ontario.

The same geographic area also attracted new German migrants from Europe, roughly 50,000 between the 1830 and 1860. Research indicates that there was no apparent conflict between the Germans from Europe and those who came from Pennsylvania.

=== Late 19th and early 20th centuries ===
By 1871, nearly 55% of the population of Waterloo County had German origins. Especially in Berlin, German was the dominant language spoken. Research indicates that there was no apparent conflict between the Germans from Europe and those who came from Pennsylvania.

The German Protestants developed the Lutheran Church along Canadian lines. In Waterloo County, Ontario, with large German elements that arrived after 1850, the Lutheran churches played major roles in the religious, cultural and social life of the community. After 1914 English became the preferred language for sermons and publications. Absent a seminary, the churches trained their own ministers, but there was a doctrinal schism in the 1860s. While the anglophone Protestants promoted the Social Gospel and prohibition, the Lutherans stood apart.

In Montreal, immigrants and Canadians of German-descent founded the German Society of Montreal in April 1835. The secular organization's purpose was to bring together the German community in the city and act as a unified voice, help sick and needy members of the community, and maintain customs and traditions. The Society is still active and celebrated its 180th anniversary in 2015.

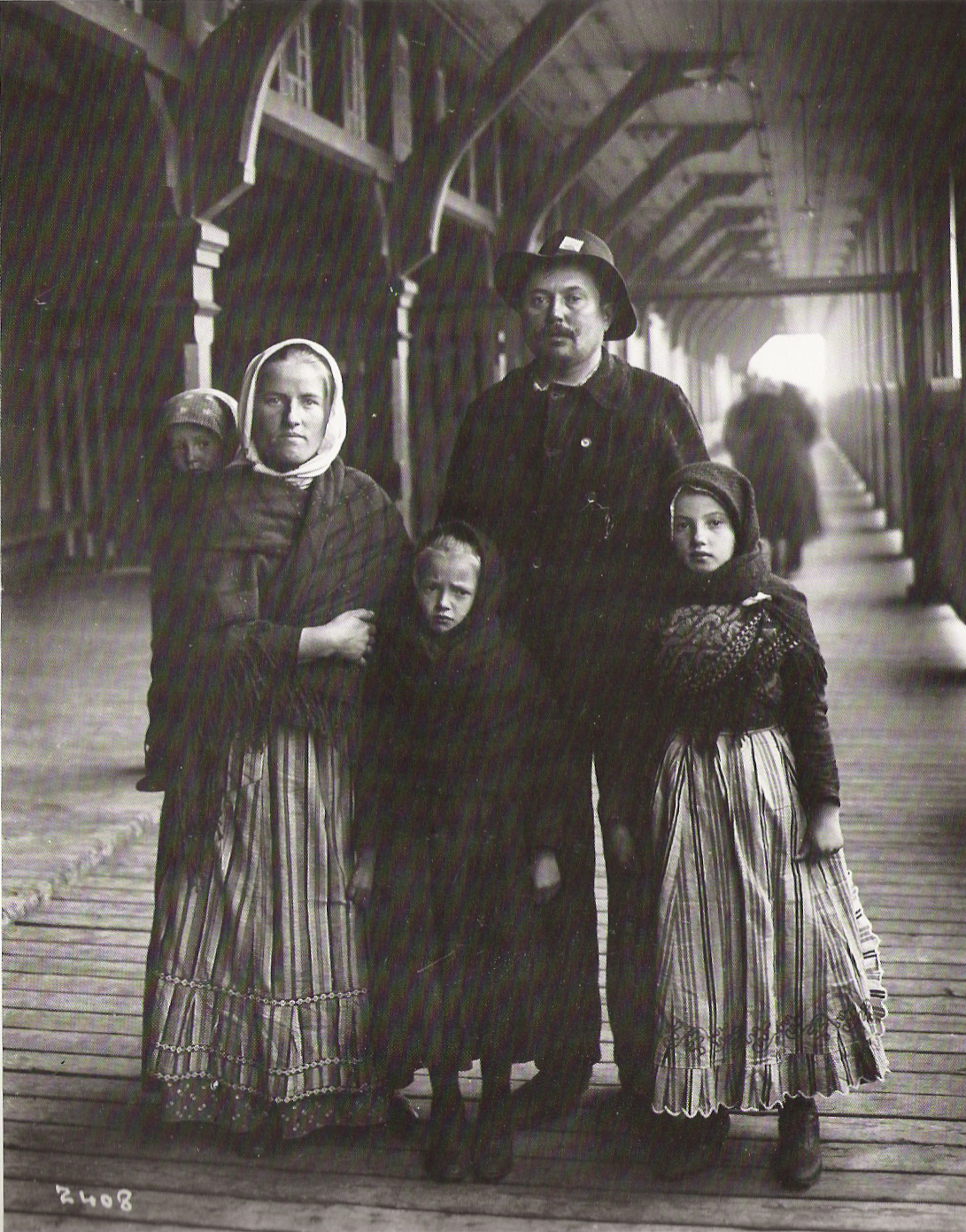
A family of German immigrants to Quebec City in 1911.

Western Canada started to attract in 1896 and draw large numbers of other German immigrants, mostly from Eastern Europe. Plautdietsch-speaking Russian Mennonites of Dutch-Prussian ancestry were especially prominent since they were persecuted by the Tsarist regime in Russia. The farmers were used to the harsh conditions of farming in southern Imperial Russia (now Ukraine) and so were some of the most successful in adapting to the Canadian Prairies. Their increase accelerated in the 1920s, when the United States imposed quotas on Central and Eastern European immigration. Soon, Canada imposed its own limits, however, and prevented most of those trying to flee the Third Reich from moving to Canada. Many of the Mennonites settled in the areas of Winnipeg and Steinbach, and the area just north of Saskatoon.

By the early 1900s, the northern part of Waterloo County, Ontario exhibited a strong German culture, and people of German origin made up a third of the population in 1911. Lutherans were the primary religious group. There were then nearly three times as many Lutherans as Mennonites. The latter, who had moved here from Pennsylvania in the first half of the 1800s, resided primarily in the rural areas and small communities.

=== First World War ===
Before and during World War I, there was some anti-German sentiment in the Waterloo County area and some cultural sanctions on the community, primarily in Berlin, Ontario (now Kitchener). Mennonites in the area were pacifist and so would not enlist. Immigrants from Germany found it morally difficult to fight against a country that was a significant part of their heritage. Low enlistment rates fueled anti-Germany sentiment that precipitated the Berlin to Kitchener name change in 1916. The city was renamed after Lord Kitchener, famously pictured on the "Lord Kitchener Wants You" recruiting posters.

Several streets in Toronto that had previously been named for Liszt, Humboldt, Schiller, Bismarck, etc. were changed to names with strong British associations, such as Balmoral. There were anti-German riots in Victoria and in Calgary during the first years of the war.

News reports from Waterloo County, Ontario, indicate "A Lutheran minister was pulled out of his house... he was dragged through the streets. German clubs were ransacked through the course of the war. It was just a really nasty time period." A document in the Archives of Canada makes the following comment: "Although ludicrous to modern eyes, the whole issue of a name for Berlin highlights the effects that fear, hatred and nationalism can have upon a society in the face of war."

Across Canada, internment camps opened in 1915 and 8,579 "enemy aliens" were held there until the end of the war. Many were German-speaking immigrants from Austria, Hungary, Germany, and Ukraine. Only 3,138 were classed as prisoners of war; the rest were civilians.

=== Second World War and later ===
The Second World War saw a renewal of anti-German sentiment in Canada. Under the War Measures Act, some 26 prisoner-of-war camps opened and interned those who had been born in Germany, Italy, and particularly in Japan if they were deemed to be "enemy aliens". For Germans, that applied especially to single males who had some association with the Nazi Party of Canada. No compensation was paid to them after the war. In Ontario, the largest internment centre for German Canadians was at Camp Petawawa, which housed 750 who had been born in Germany and Austria.

Between 1945 and 1994, some 400,000 German-speaking immigrants arrived in Canada; approximately 270,000 of these arrived by the early 1960s. Around a third of postwar German immigrants were from various parts of Eastern Europe and formerly German or German-ruled territories which fell outside of the boundaries of the two postwar German states. Migration followed a sponsorship system predominantly led by churches, leading to an influx of German immigrants to existing German neighbourhoods in cities like Toronto, Vancouver, and Winnipeg, as well as rural townships in the Prairies. Alexander Freund remarks that "[f]or postwar Canadians [...] the great influx of German-speaking immigrants after the war posed, at least potentially, a personal confrontation with the recent past that could be difficult to navigate." There were also tensions between Germans and other European immigrants, some of whom had suffered under German occupation in Europe. Postwar Canadians "did not distinguish between Germans and Nazis", and this perspective was bolstered by decades of American war films which portrayed Germans in an unsympathetic light. Pressure increased on Germans to assimilate. German-Canadians began to create advocacy organizations to promote their interests, such as the Trans-Canada Alliance for German Canadians, which was founded in 1951 by social democrats but was soon taken over by right-wing elements of the German community. In addition, the Canadian Baltic Immigrant Aid Society was founded in 1948 to provide information and aid to Baltic Germans immigrating to Canada.

Going into the 1960s, Canadian nationalism and ethnic politics revolved increasingly around the Anglophone-Francophone divide, leaving little place for other groups, including the Germans. As the war became more distant, the Canadian national narrative, guided by historians, journalists, and veterans' organizations, was formed with the exclusion of German or other inter-cultural perspectives on the war, emphasizing instead themes of heroism and sacrifice by Canadian soldiers. Some German-Canadians "withdrew into a 'culture of grievance.'" As time went on, Canadian perspectives broadened around controversial Allied actions such as the bombing of Dresden, which some German-Canadians found encouraging.

== Demography ==
Canadians of German descent total population (1871−2016)
Note1: 1981 Canadian census did not include multiple ethnic origin responses, thus population is an undercount.
Note2: 1996-present census populations are undercounts, due to the creation of the "Canadian" ethnic origin category. View source data.
Canadians of German descent percentage of the total population (1871−2016)
Note1: 1981 Canadian census did not include multiple ethnic origin responses, thus population is an undercount.
Note2: 1996-present census populations are undercounts, due to the creation of the "Canadian" ethnic origin category. View source data.

=== Population ===
German Canadian Population History 1871−2016
| Year | Population | % of total population |
|---|---|---|
| 1871 | 202,991 | 5.823% |
| 1881 | 254,319 | 5.88% |
| 1901 | 310,501 | 5.781% |
| 1911 | 403,417 | 5.598% |
| 1921 | 294,635 | 3.353% |
| 1931 | 473,544 | 4.563% |
| 1941 | 464,682 | 4.038% |
| 1951 | 619,995 | 4.426% |
| 1961 | 1,049,599 | 5.755% |
| 1971 | 1,317,200 | 6.107% |
| 1981 | 1,142,365 | 4.743% |
| 1986 | 2,467,055 | 9.86% |
| 1991 | 2,793,780 | 10.35% |
| 1996 | 2,757,140 | 9.665% |
| 2001 | 2,742,765 | 9.254% |
| 2006 | 3,179,425 | 10.177% |
| 2011 | 3,203,330 | 9.751% |
| 2016 | 3,322,405 | 9.641% |

=== Religion ===
German Canadian demography by religion
| Religious group | 2021 (Note: Religious breakdown proportions based on "German" ethnic or cultural origin response on the 2021 census.) | | 2001 (Note: Religious breakdown proportions based on "German" ethnic or cultural origin response on the 2001 census.) | |
| Religious group | Pop. | % | Pop. | % |
|---|---|---|---|---|
| Christianity | 1,586,875 | 53.69% | 2,165,890 | 78.97% |
| Islam | 3,825 | 0.13% | 2,095 | 0.08% |
| Irreligion | 1,317,895 | 44.59% | 553,435 | 20.18% |
| Judaism | 12,745 | 0.43% | 8,070 | 0.29% |
| Buddhism | 5,095 | 0.17% | 3,880 | 0.14% |
| Hinduism | 740 | 0.03% | 400 | 0.02% |
| Indigenous spirituality | 1,960 | 0.07% | 2,335 | 0.09% |
| Sikhism | 380 | 0.01% | 390 | 0.01% |
| Other | 26,170 | 0.89% | 6,275 | 0.23% |
| Total German Canadian population | 2,955,700 | 100% | 2,742,765 | 100% |

German Canadian demography by Christian sects
| Religious group | 2021 | | 2001 | |
| Religious group | Pop. | % | Pop. | % |
|---|---|---|---|---|
| Catholic | 563,015 | 35.48% | 692,180 | 31.96% |
| Orthodox | 11,165 | 0.7% | 8,830 | 0.41% |
| Protestant | 726,095 | 45.76% | 1,353,660 | 62.5% |
| Other Christian | 286,600 | 18.06% | 111,220 | 5.14% |
| Total German canadian christian population | 1,586,875 | 100% | 2,165,890 | 100% |

== Geographical distribution ==
=== Provinces & territories ===
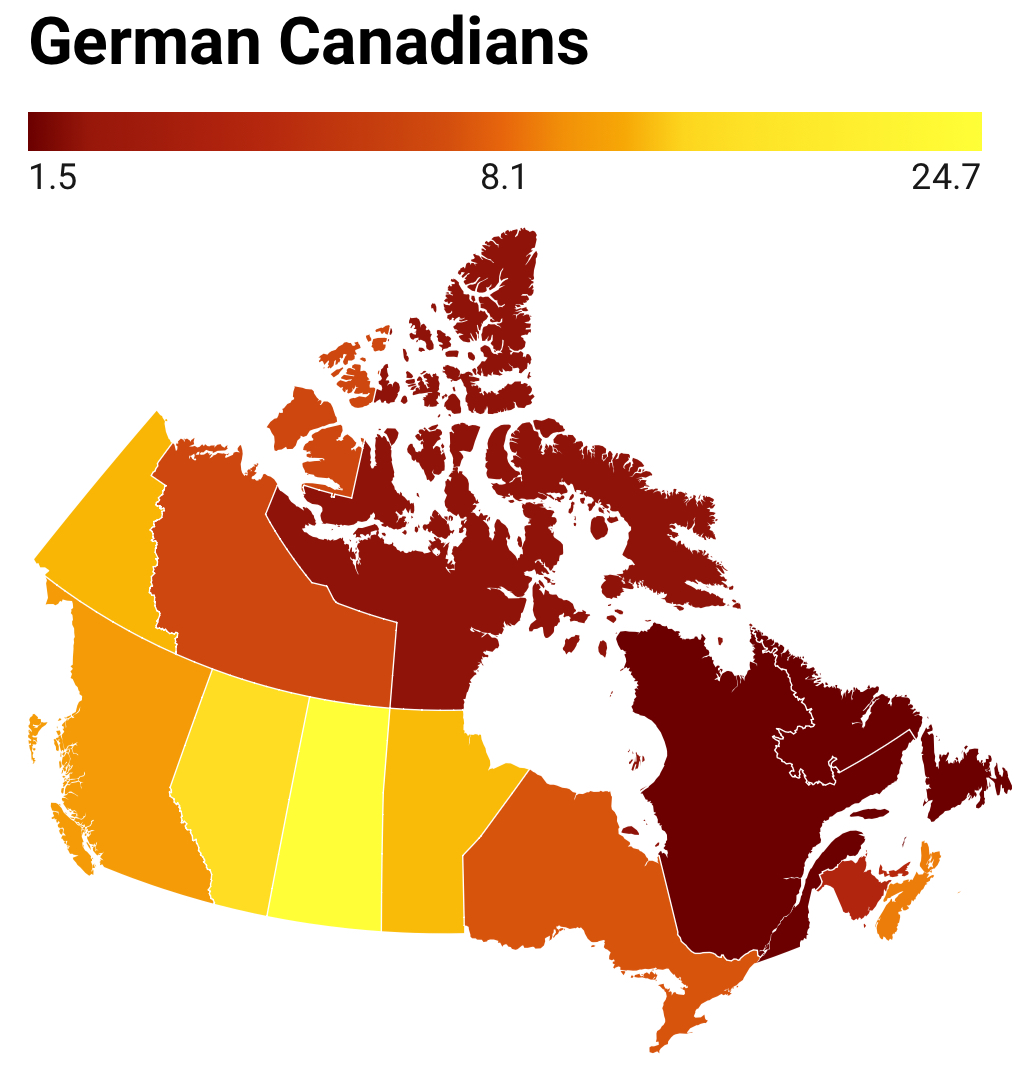
German percent in Canada by province/territory, 2021 census

German Canadians by province and territory (2001−2016)
| Province/Territory | 2016 | | 2011 | | 2006 | | 2001 | |
| Province/Territory | Pop. | % | Pop. | % | Pop. | % | Pop. | % |
|---|---|---|---|---|---|---|---|---|
| Ontario | 1,189,670 | 8.98% | 1,154,550 | 9.13% | 1,144,560 | 9.52% | 965,510 | 8.56% |
| Alberta | 712,955 | 17.92% | 683,830 | 19.17% | 679,700 | 20.87% | 576,350 | 19.6% |
| British Columbia | 603,265 | 13.23% | 567,670 | 13.13% | 561,570 | 13.78% | 500,675 | 12.94% |
| Saskatchewan | 296,385 | 27.69% | 288,790 | 28.63% | 286,045 | 29.99% | 275,060 | 28.56% |
| Manitoba | 220,735 | 17.79% | 218,490 | 18.61% | 216,755 | 19.12% | 200,370 | 18.15% |
| Quebec | 142,230 | 1.79% | 132,945 | 1.72% | 131,795 | 1.77% | 88,700 | 1.24% |
| Nova Scotia | 97,550 | 10.74% | 97,605 | 10.77% | 101,865 | 11.28% | 89,460 | 9.97% |
| New Brunswick | 34,205 | 4.68% | 34,870 | 4.74% | 33,830 | 4.7% | 27,490 | 3.82% |
| Newfoundland and Labrador | 8,620 | 1.68% | 8,190 | 1.61% | 7,390 | 1.48% | 6,275 | 1.24% |
| Prince Edward Island | 7,060 | 5.05% | 7,160 | 5.21% | 7,050 | 5.25% | 5,400 | 4.05% |
| Yukon | 5,575 | 15.88% | 5,210 | 15.64% | 4,835 | 16.01% | 4,085 | 14.32% |
| Northwest Territories | 3,410 | 8.29% | 3,375 | 8.27% | 3,495 | 8.51% | 3,005 | 8.1% |
| Nunavut | 745 | 2.09% | 640 | 2.02% | 550 | 1.88% | 395 | 1.48% |
| Canada | 3,322,405 | 9.64% | 3,203,330 | 9.75% | 3,179,425 | 10.18% | 2,742,765 | 9.25% |

==== Prairies ====
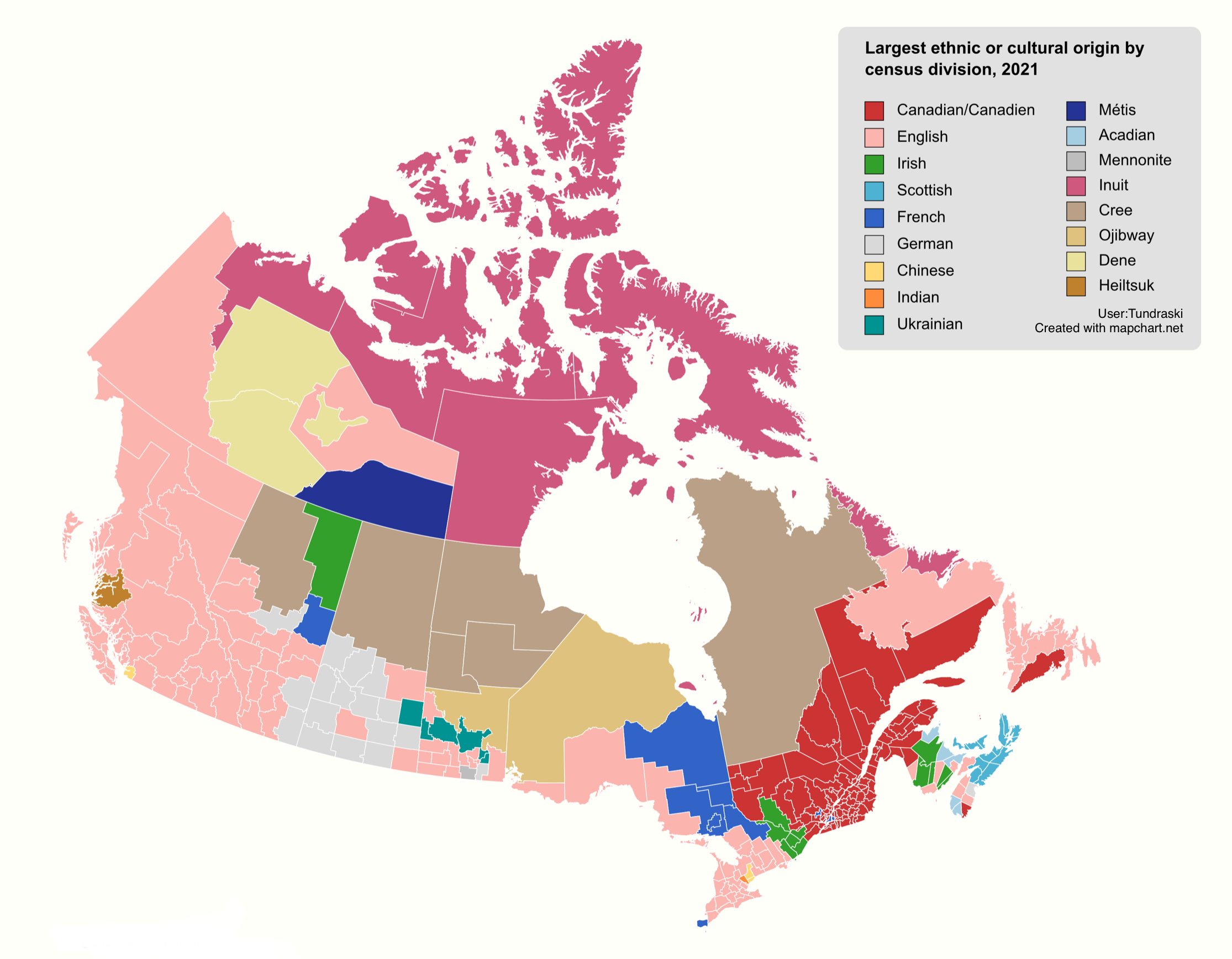
People who have self-identified as having German ancestors are the plurality in many parts of the Prairie provinces (areas coloured in grey)

There are several German ethnic-bloc settlements in the Canadian Prairies in western Canada. Over a quarter of people in Saskatchewan are German-Canadians. German bloc settlements include the areas around Strasbourg, Bulyea, Leader, Burstall, Fox Valley, Eatonia, St. Walburg, Paradise Hill, Loon Lake, Goodsoil, Pierceland, Meadow Lake, Edenwold, Windthorst, Lemberg, Qu'appelle, Neudorf, Grayson, Langenburg, Kerrobert, Unity, Luseland, Macklin, Humboldt, Watson, Cudworth, Lampman, Midale, Tribune, Consul, Rockglen, Shaunavon and Swift Current.

In Saskatchewan the German settlers came directly from Russia, or, after 1914 from the Dakotas. They came not as large groups but as part of a chain of family members, where the first immigrants would find suitable locations and send for the others. They formed compact German-speaking communities built around their Catholic or Lutheran churches, and continuing old-world customs. They were farmers who grew wheat and sugar beets. Arrivals from Russia, Bukovina, and Romanian Dobruja established their villages in a 40-mile-wide tract east of Regina. The Germans operated parochial schools primarily to maintain their religious faith; often they offered only an hour of German language instruction a week, but they always had extensive coverage of religion. Most German Catholic children by 1910 attended schools taught entirely in English. From 1900 to 1930, German Catholics generally voted for the Liberal ticket (rather than the Provincial Rights and Conservative tickets), seeing Liberals as more willing to protect religious minorities. Occasionally they voted for Conservatives or independent candidates who offered greater support for public funding of parochial schools. Nazi Germany made a systematic effort to proselytize among Saskatchewan's Germans in the 1930s. Fewer than 1% endorsed their message, but some did migrate back to Germany before anti-Nazi sentiment became overwhelming in 1939.

== Culture ==
=== Music ===
The choral tradition is historically very prominent within German music in Canada. In the latter part of the 19th century, Turnvereine (Turner clubs) were active in both Canada and the United States, and were associated with communities of German continental immigrants in urban centres such as Cincinnati, Ohio; Buffalo, New York; and Erie, Pennsylvania. The Sängerfest ("singer festival", plural Sängerfeste) movement, which began in Germany at the start of the 19th century, spread to the United States by the 1840s, and to Canada by 1862, when the first major Sängerfest was held in Berlin, Canada West (later Kitchener, Ontario) from August 6 to 9. This followed the format of a typical Turner event by also including theatrical and athletic events, as well as band concerts. Another festival was held the following year in the nearby community of Waterloo, which had an audience of 2000 people. It was followed in 1866 by an even larger event, organized by the German Club of Hamilton, which had 5000 attendees and featured choirs from both Ontario and the United States.

The continued success of these events led to the founding of the Deutsch-kanadischer Sängerbund (German-Canadian Choir Federation) in Hamilton in 1873 and the Canadian Choir Federation in Berlin in 1893. Major song and music festivals were held by German communities throughout Ontario in Toronto, Hamilton, Waterloo, Bowmanville, Guelph, Sarnia, Port Elgin, Bridgeport, Elmira, and, most often out of all of these, in Berlin. Three of the most spectacular Sängerfeste were organized by Berlin's Concordia Club; one 1879 festival which was organized by the club attracted 12,000 visitors. Anti-German sentiment, which arose during the First World War, led to an interruption in the Sängerfeste, along with other German cultural institutions, and attempts to re-establish the tradition during the mid-20th century postwar period were largely unsuccessful due to social changes. The last significant Sängerfest in Canada were held in the 1980s.

=== Folklore ===
The antiquarian, archaeologist, and folklorist William J. Wintemberg produced a number of works on folklore in Ontario during the late 19th and early 20th centuries, including communities whose traditions and beliefs were based in the Pennsylvania German cultural milieu. With widespread social change in the 20th century, these traditional beliefs began to decline, though some persisted in reduced form. These communities were deeply religious, but also commonly had spiritual beliefs described by George Elmore Reaman as "mystic". Their folkloric traditions included proverbs, rituals, and beliefs about the weather, luck, health and health problems, wild and domestic animals, crops, certain herbs and other plants believed to have special properties, witches and witchcraft, blessings, and particular times of the year, such as specific holidays. The moon and its phases were also important to them, as well as the signs of the Zodiac. They had a complex set of beliefs around thunder and lightning and their cause and avoidance, as well as particular beliefs around fires caused by lightning. The celt had some prominence as a cultural object, and was called the gewitter-stein ("lightning stone") or donder-keidel ("thunder wedge"); it was associated with the splitting of trees by lightning. People who were regarded as witches and witch doctors both existed in these communities. Accounts of witches sometimes associate them with curses. Accounts of witch doctors often associate them with charms, or healing of both people and livestock. The famous hex signs painted on barns in Pennsylvania were historically absent from German barns in Ontario, as barns were usually unpainted. There was, however, a strong belief in rituals and objects associated with both good and bad luck; good luck is associated with charms and symbols such as the sign of the cross, the four-leaf clover, and the finding of a horseshoe.

== Education ==
There are two German international schools in Canada:

- Alexander von Humboldt Schule Montréal
- German International School Toronto

There are also bilingual German-English K-12 schools in Winnipeg, Manitoba:

- Donwood Elementary School (K–5)
- Princess Margaret School (K–5)
- Chief Peguis Junior High (6–8)
- River East Collegiate (9–12)
- Westgate Mennonite Collegiate (6-12)

== See also ==
- Canada–Germany relations
- Foreign Protestants
- German Americans
- Hessian (soldiers)
- German inventors and discoverers
- German Mills, Ontario
- German Canadian Club Hansa
- Waterloo County, Ontario
- Berliner Journal
- List of German language newspapers of Ontario
