= Alain Goldschlager =

Canadian professor (born 1946)

Alain J. Goldschläger
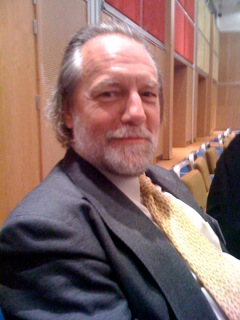
- Born: Alain Joseph Goldschläger; 1946 (age 79–80); Canada
- Family: Grandmother, Isabelle Blume

Alain Joseph Goldschläger (born 1946), is a professor at the University of Western Ontario (London, Canada). He holds a PhD from the University of Toronto (1975). He specializes in French language and literature, literature of the Shoah and testimonial writing.

He is the grandson of Isabelle Blume, a Belgian socialist parliamentarian and later communist activist.

== Career ==
Goldschläger is the Director of the Holocaust Literature Research Institute (HLRI), which he founded in 1996. The institute works closely with other Canadian universities and their libraries. Since 2018, Goldschläger began assisting the University of Toronto in expanding their collection on the Shoah and testimonies, in collaboration with the HLRI.

Goldschläger played an important role in the creation of the "General Romeo Dallaire Summer Institute" founded by Romeo Dellaire. He taught there from 2003 to 2006, on the Holocaust and genocide. He was also a member of the Canadian Commission for UNESCO including the sub-Committee on Culture the sub-Committee on the Status of Women (1986-1989). Since 2009 he is chair of the National Task Force on Holocaust Education. He was a Canadian delegate to the International Holocaust Remembrance Alliance (Oslo, 2009) and Canadian delegate to the Holocaust Era Assets Conference (Prague, 2009).

== Community involvement ==
Goldschläger was the president of the Canadian Semiotic Association (1981–1983) while being one if its founder members in 1971. He was briefly president of the Canadian Comparative Literature Association (1985–1987) and a member of the Canadian Federation for the Humanities (1981–1988). Goldschläger has been the Director of the Canada-Israel Foundation for Academic Exchanges (1988–2003), which assist in bettering the lives of Jewish people in the Greater Toronto Area, Israel and around the world.

Since 2004 he has also been president of the League for Human Rights of B'nai B'rith, Ontario. Since 2014, he has served as a juror for the Canadian Jewish Literacy Awards.

== Bibliography ==
=== Books ===
- Image et images du Moyen Age, Tours, Paradigme, 2013
- The Conspiracy revealed: Jews, Freemasons, Illuminati (with Jacques Ch. Lemaire), Toronto, League for Human Rights, 2011
- L'Imaginaire juif (with Jacques Lemaire) Liège, Presses de l'Université de Liège, 2007.
- Le Complot Judéo-maçonnique (with Jacques Lemaire) Bruxelles, Espaces de Libertés, 2005.
- Building History: Art, Memory, and Myth (with Naomi Kramer), Institut de recherche sur la littérature de l'Holocauste, London (Ontario) 1997.
- Simone Weil et Spinoza, Sherbrooke, Editions Naaman, 1982.

=== Books edited ===
- L'Antisémitisme après la Shoah, (edited with Jacques Lemaire), Bruxelles, Espace de libertés, 2003.
- La Langue de bois, (edited with Jacques Lemaire), La Pensée et les Hommes, Bruxelles, Presses de l'Université de Bruxelles, 2001.
- Building History: The Shoah in Art, Memory, and Myth (edited with Peter Daly, Karl Filser, Naomi Kramer) New York, Peter Lang, 2001. (Vol. 4 of Mc Gill European Studies)
- La Shoah: témoignage impossible (with Jacques Lemaire) Bruxelles, Presses de l'Université de Bruxelles, 1998.
- Le Discours scientifique comme porteur de préjugés (with Clive Thomson) London, Mestengo Press, 1998.
- Language and Literature today: Modernity and Postmodernism; proceeding of the International Congress of F.I.L.L.M., Brasília (with * Dr. Eva Kushner); Brasília, Universidade de Brasília, 1996.
- Le Mensonge, Bruxelles, Presses de l'Université de Bruxelles, 1993.

=== Articles on the Shoah and subsequent testimonies ===
1. "Le Canada, la négation des génocides et l'Arménie", Le génocide Turc des Arméniens, Bruxelles, La Pensée et les Hommes, 57. 90, 2013, pp. 159–170.
2. "The trials of Ernst Zündel" in Robert Wistrich (ed), Holocaust Denial, Berlin/Boston/Jerusalem, Walter de Gruyter GmbH & Co, 2012, pp. 109–135.
3. "Préface to Klein, Ruth (ed) Nazi Germany, Canadian Responses, Montreal/Kingston, McGill-Queen's UP, 2012.
4. "Deux voix de témoignage: Rwanda et Shoah", International Symposium on the genocide against Tutsi, Kigali (Rwanda), April 2009. Article à paraître.
5. "Témoignages des victimes: modes opératoires", Rwanda. Récit du génocide, traversée de la mémoire, La Pensée et les Hommes, 2009, pp. 127–135.
6. "Primo Levi ou le Juif numéro 174517", La Tribune Juive Montréal, 2008, pp. 68–73.
7. "Main dans la main: antisémitisme, antisionisme et révisionnisme", L'Antisémitisme après la Shoah, Bruxelles, Espace de libertés, 2003, pp. 9–28.
8. "Prolégomène à une théorie de la conspiration", Sam Bloom & Ilana Zinguer, L'Antisémitisme éclairé: inclusion et exclusion depuis l'époque des Lumières jusqu'à l'Affaire Dreyfus, Leiden (Holland), Brill's Academic Press, 2003, pp 211–220.
9. "La littérature critique sur les témoignages de la Shoah: courants actuels", ICLA Literary Research/ Recherche Littéraire, vol 19, no 37-38, 2002, pp. 272–284.
10. "The Duty of memory and the Reading of Testimonies", Building History, New York, Peter Lang, 2001, pp. 109–123.
11. "Problématique de la mémoire", La Shoah: témoignage impossible? Bruxelles, Presses de l'Université de Bruxelles, 1998, pp. 19–39.
12. "La littérature de témoignage de la Shoah: dire l'indicible - lire l'incompréhensible", Le Narratif hors fiction, numéro spécial de TEXTE, 1996 19/20, pp259–278.
13. "Mensonge et révisionnisme", Carrefour, 1994, 16-1 pp. 39–50.

=== Articles on literary and semiotic subjects or pertaining to discourse theories ===
1. "L'antisémitisme au Canada, en Argentine et au Brésil", Daniel Castillo Durante, Amy Colin & Patrick Imbert, Exclusion/Inclusion, Ottawa/New York, Legas, 2005, pp. 87–98.
2. "Stendhal, mauvais disciple de Sade", L'Année Stendhalienne, 4, 2005, pp. 193–204.
3. "La langue de bois du nationalisme québécois", La Pensée et les Hommes, Bruxelles, Presses de l'Université de Bruxelles, 2001, pp. 89–104.
4. "Quelques réflexions sur la langue de bois", La Pensée et les Hommes, Bruxelles, Presses de l'Université de Bruxelles, 2001, pp. 7–12. (Introduction)
5. "Des Mésaventures d'un concept", Ars Rhetorica, Mai 1996, pp. 81–89.
6. "À propos de Le Pen: réflexions sur un discours nationaliste", La Pensée et les Hommes, Bruxelles, Université de Bruxelles, 1994, pp. 99–108.
7. "Le Juif d'Adrien Arcand", Discours et mythes de l'ethnicité, Nadia Khouri éd., Montréal, ACFAS, 1992, pp. 185–196.
8. "L'inscription du genre dans le paratexte", Literary Genres/Les genres littéraires, MacLaren & Potvin ed., Edmonton, University of Alberta, 1991, pp. 13–18.
9. "Women and Naming as Exemplified in Contemporary French Canadian Feminist Literature", Israel Association for Canadian Studies, 1989 pp. 57–66.
10. "On ideological discourse" Semiotica 54 1/2 (1985) pp. 165–176.
