= Asia–Canada relations =

Diplomatic relations between the various countries of Asia and Canada

Canada has various ties to Asian countries. These include bilateral relations between Canada and individual Asian states and multilateral relations through groups such as Asia-Pacific Economic Cooperation.

== Historical relations ==
Canada's relations with Asia stem from their respective pasts, particularly with those countries who are also members of the British Commonwealth of Nations. This is because until the Balfour Declaration of 1926 Canada's foreign affairs were mainly handled by Britain. Canada also shares a colonial past with Asian countries previously under French rule, Indochina which is namely Vietnam, Laos and Cambodia. Prior to the establishment of bilateral ties between Asia and Canada, thousands of Chinese and Japanese immigrants arrived in Canada throughout the 19th century.

Direct engagement with Asia began in 1919 with the formation of the League of Nations. Canada was one of the founding members, which also included the Asian states of China, Japan and Thailand, then known as Siam.

The 1923 Chinese Immigration Act banned all immigrants from China, except for those with the title of Diplomat, Merchant or Foreign student. The Act was repealed in 1947.

In 1929 Canada opened a legation in Tokyo.

The next significant interaction with Asia was the Canadian's involvement in fighting the Japanese in World War II. During the War the majority of Japanese-Canadians were placed in internment camps under the War Measures Act.

Canada's postwar diplomatic engagement also extended to the Middle East: it recognized Israel de facto on December 24, 1948, and de jure on May 11, 1949.

Canada also partook in the Korean War.

Bilateral diplomatic ties with China were established in 1971, when the two countries exchanged ambassadors. This was followed by a 1973 visit to China by Canadian Prime Minister Pierre Trudeau.

Today, Asian Canadians comprise about 11.73% of Canada's total population.

== Political relations ==
Canada's relations with Asia vary significantly between countries. For example, Canada has taken a number of political and economic measures against Burma, whose military government's policies it believes violate human rights. This is contrasted with warmer ties with countries like South Korea, with whom Canada has relaxed visa, educational and trade policies.

Canada is one of 41 countries participating in the International Security Assistance Force (ISAF) mission in Afghanistan, where Canada has been engaged in Security and Reconstruction efforts since 2002.

Canada provides aid to many Asian countries, with a special focus on Afghanistan, Pakistan, Vietnam, Indonesia and Bangladesh.

=== Intergovernmental organizations ===
Canada is a member of APEC, an intergovernmental forum dedicated to promoting free trade and investment, economic growth and development, and cooperation in the Asia–Pacific region.

Canada maintains close ties with the Association of Southeast Asian Nations through the Joint Cooperation Workplan signed between the two parties.

Canada, Vietnam, Cambodia and Laos are all members of la Organisation internationale de la Francophonie.

== Economic relations ==
Asia's market share (the proportion of Canadian imports) in Canada accounts for 19.2%. 9.83% of total Canadian imports come from China and 3.53% come from Japan. Canada's market share in Asia is only 0.96%, creating a trade deficit. Due to its proximity to Asia across the Pacific Vancouver is the major port for Canada's trade with Asia. This has prompted the Canadian government's Asia–Pacific Gateway and Corridor Initiative.

Canada is currently negotiating Free Trade Agreements with South Korea and Singapore and is engaged in discussions for a Comprehensive Economic Partnership Agreement with India. It also has several Foreign Investment Protection and Promotion Agreements with Asian countries.

According to the China Goes Global Survey conducted by the Asia Pacific Foundation of Canada, Canada is poised to accept a greater share of Chinese investment, as Canada is seen by Chinese investors as having one of the most open attitudes to their presence.

== Canada's foreign relations with Asian countries ==
- Afghanistan
- Armenia
- Azerbaijan
- Bahrain
- Bangladesh
- Bhutan
- Brunei
- Cambodia
- China
- Cyprus
- (Georgia (country)) Georgia
- India
- Indonesia
- Iran
- Iraq
- Israel
- Japan
- Jordan
- Kazakhstan
- Kuwait
- Kyrgyzstan
- Laos
- Lebanon
- Malaysia
- Maldives
- Mongolia
- Myanmar
- Nepal
- North Korea
- Oman
- Pakistan
- Palestine
- Philippines
- Qatar
- Russia
- Saudi Arabia
- Singapore
- South Korea
- Sri Lanka
- Syria
- Taiwan
- Tajikistan
- Thailand
- Timor-Leste
- Turkey
- Turkmenistan
- United Arab Emirates
- Uzbekistan
- Vietnam
- Yemen

== See also ==
- Foreign relations of Canada
