= Bhutan–Russia relations =

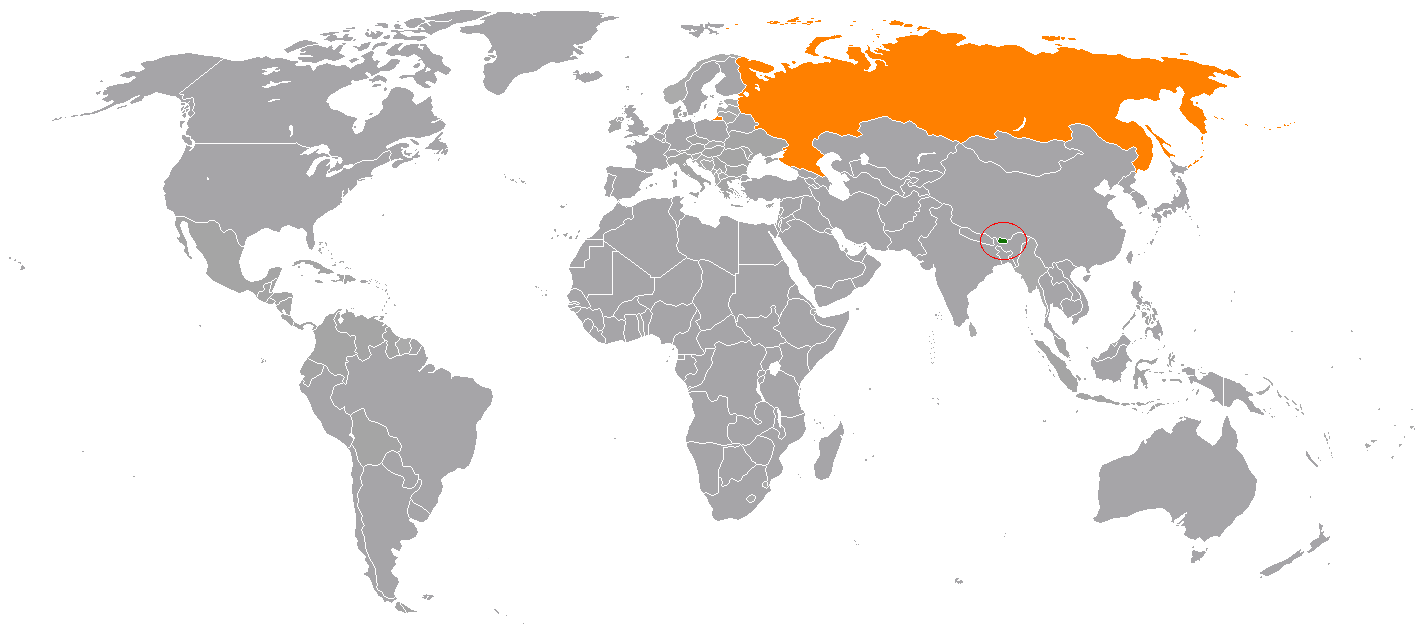
- Bhutan: Russia

Official diplomatic relations between Bhutan and Russia are yet to be established.

An exhibition on Buddhism in Russia ran from November to December 2011, at the Nehru-Wangchuck Cultural Centre at the Embassy of India in Thimphu, Bhutan. This exhibition focused on developing humanitarian and cultural relations between Russia and Bhutan, and has been the first event of its kind in Bhutan.

== See also ==
- Foreign relations of Bhutan
- Foreign relations of Russia
