= List of diplomatic missions of Bhutan =

Foreign relations of the Himalayan Kingdom of Bhutan

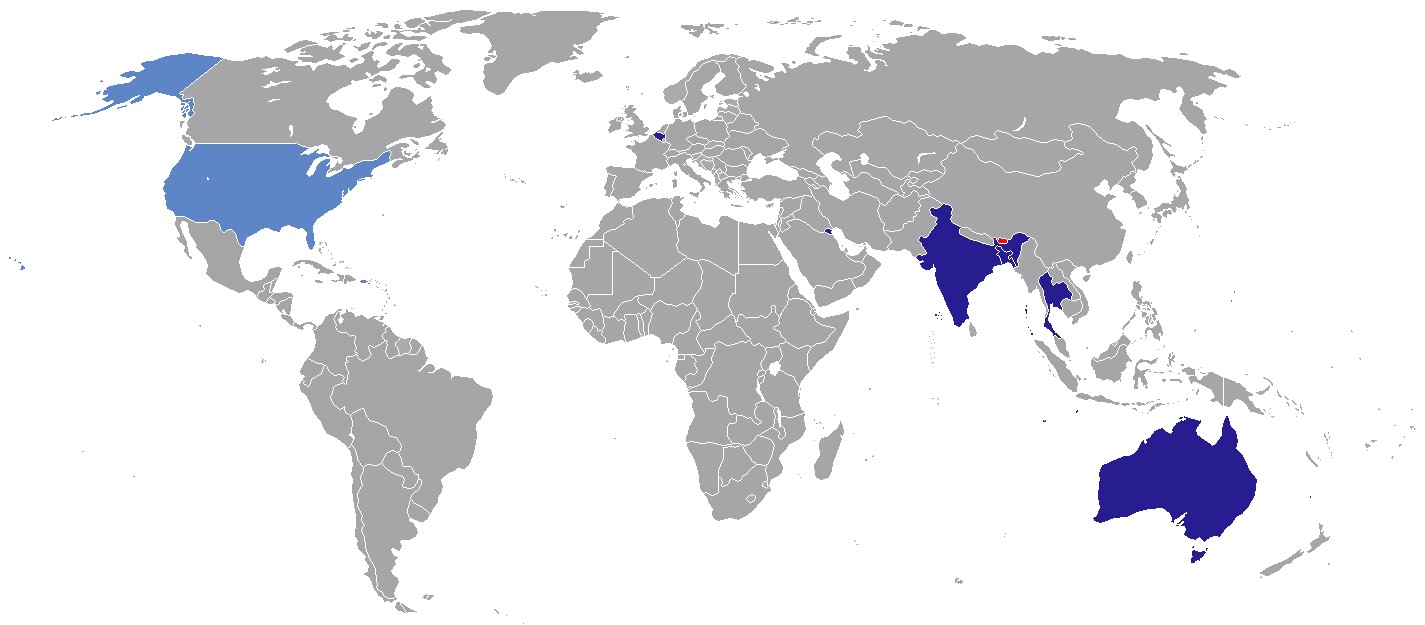
Kingdom of Bhutan Countries that host Bhutanese embassies Countries that host only Bhutanese consulates or permanent missions to international organizations

This is a list of diplomatic missions of Bhutan. The landlocked and isolationist Himalayan kingdom of Bhutan has a very limited number of diplomatic missions abroad.

As of 2025, Bhutan operates 6 embassies, 3 consulates, and 2 permanent missions.

== Missions ==
=== Individual countries ===
List of operating diplomatic missions to individual countries as of 2021
Country	Region	City	Mission	Opened	Concurrent accreditation	Ref(s)
Australia	Oceania	Canberra	Embassy	2021		
Bangladesh	Asia	Dhaka	Embassy	1980	Countries: Maldives; Pakistan; South Korea; Sri Lanka	
Belgium	Europe	Brussels	Embassy	2009	Countries: Denmark; Finland; Germany; Netherlands; Serbia; Spain; Sweden; International Organizations: European Union	
India	Asia	New Delhi	Embassy (Note: Established as an office of a "special representative" in 1971; upgraded into an embassy in 1978.)	1978	Countries: Afghanistan; Japan; Mongolia; Nepal; Vietnam	
India	Asia	Guwahati	Consulate-General	2018		
India	Asia	Kolkata	Consulate-General	2009		
Kuwait	Asia	Kuwait City	Embassy	1983	Countries: Bahrain; Qatar; Saudi Arabia; United Arab Emirates	
Thailand	Asia	Bangkok	Embassy	1999	Countries: Indonesia; Myanmar; Singapore	
United States	Americas	New York City	Consulate-General			

=== Multilateral organizations ===
List of operating diplomatic missions to multilateral organisations as of 2021
Organization	City	Country	Mission	Opened	Concurrent accreditation	Ref(s)
United Nations	Geneva	Switzerland	Permanent mission	1985	Countries: Austria; Norway; Switzerland	
United Nations	New York City	United States	Permanent mission	1971	Countries: Brazil; Canada	

== Gallery ==
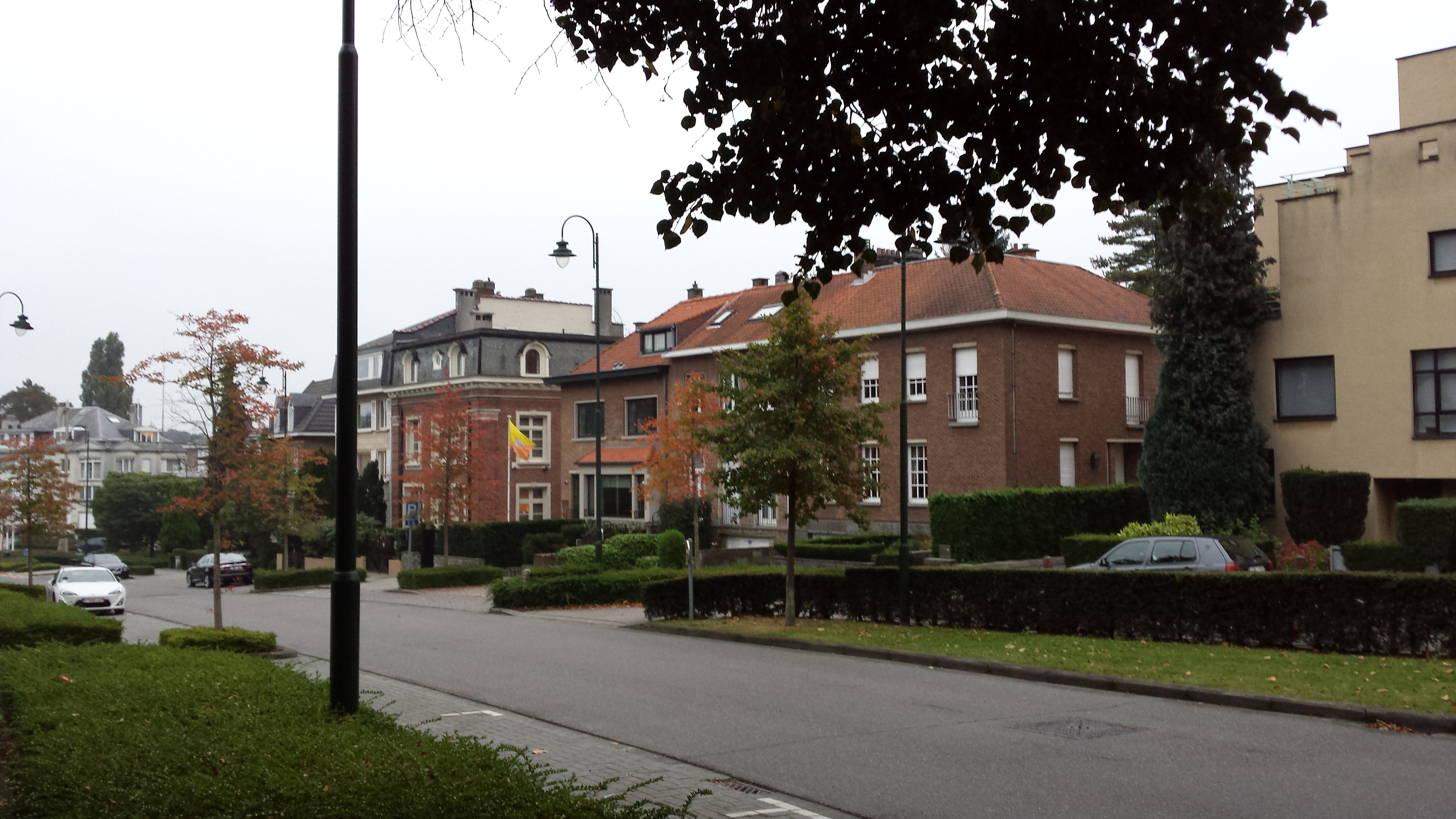
Embassy in Brussels

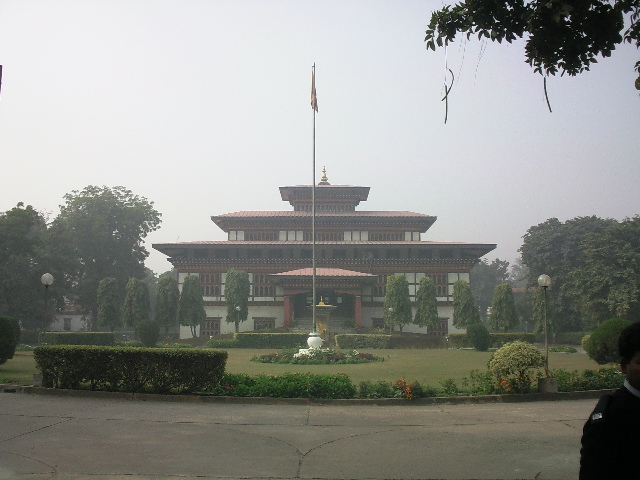
Embassy in New Delhi

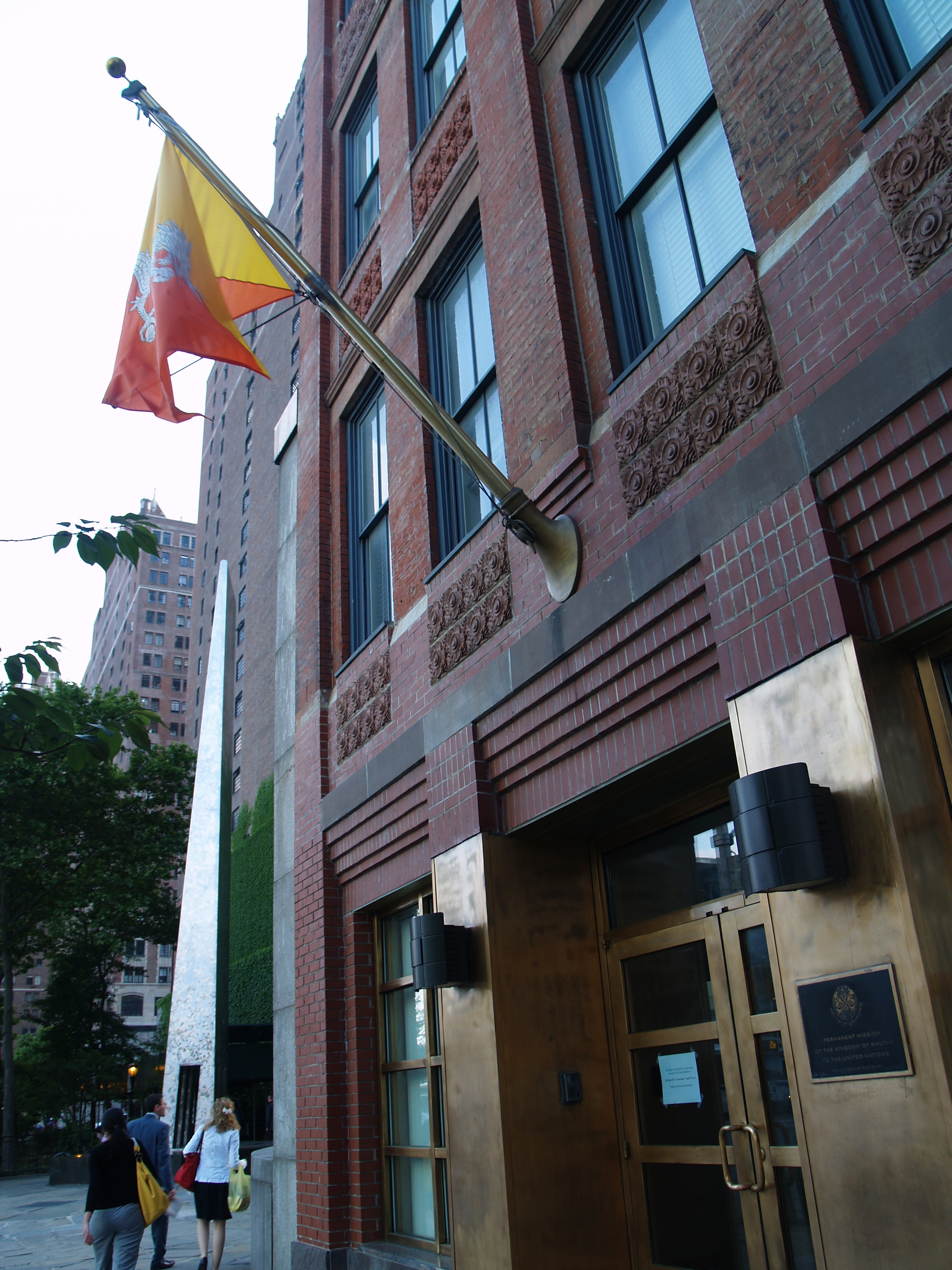
Permanent Mission to the U.N. in New York City

== See also ==
- Foreign relations of Bhutan
- List of diplomatic missions in Bhutan
- Visa policy of Bhutan
