= Bhutan–Germany relations =

- Germany: Bhutan

Bhutan–Germany relations are the bilateral relations between Bhutan and Germany. Germany has a non-resident embassy housed in New Delhi. Bhutan is represented in Germany by its embassy in Brussels. Both Germany and Bhutan have honorary consuls in each of their countries.

== History ==
While Germany started providing assistance to Bhutan from the early 1970s and consular relations were established in 2006, diplomatic ties were established on 25 November 2020 through the exchange of verbale notes. Bhutan was included by Germany in its bilateral assistance program from 1987. Subsequently, a technical cooperation agreement was signed between both states on 21 December 1989.

== Co-operation ==
After the signage of the technical cooperation agreement in December 1989, Deutsche Gesellschaft für Internationale Zusammenarbeit established an office in Thimphu which provided assistance to German projects in Bhutan which mainly focused on renewable natural resources, culture, health and development of technical institutes. After the completion of its last project, the office was closed in 2006.

Germany and Bhutan collaborate in the area of climate and environmental protection and cultural preservation projects. Germany has helped in the restoration of the bridge linking Punakha monastery and also in preservation of Bhutanese manuscripts. In the field of academic cooperation, German universities provides enrollments and scholarships to Bhutanese students under the German Academic Exchange Service. Bhutan has been receiving financial assistance from the European Union of which Germany is a major contributor.

== High level visits ==
In March 2023, the Prime Minister of Bhutan Lotay Tshering made an official visit to Germany where he met German chancellor Olaf Scholz. The Bhutanese Prime Minister met with officials from the Deutsche Gesellschaft für Internationale Zusammenarbeit and other business institutions to discuss trade and business for Bhutan. He also visited the Karlsruhe Institute of Technology to discuss partnership in academics. The German chancellor appreciated Bhutan for its role in measuring wellbeing with Gross National Happiness. Both leaders also pledged to intensify partnership in the area of climate and environmental protection.

== Friendship associations ==
Friendship associations established by common citizens also exist in the two countries. German citizens operate German-Bhutan Himalaya Society, Pro Bhutan e.V and Bhutan Help Society in Germany. The associations undertake community and public welfare works. Pro Bhutan has cooperated with the Royal Government of Bhutan providing assistance worth 500 million Ngultrum. It has helped in the construction of a museum, a monastery in Thimphu and the community hall in Punakha among others.

== See also ==
- Foreign relations of Bhutan
- Foreign relations of Germany
