= Crime in Bhutan =

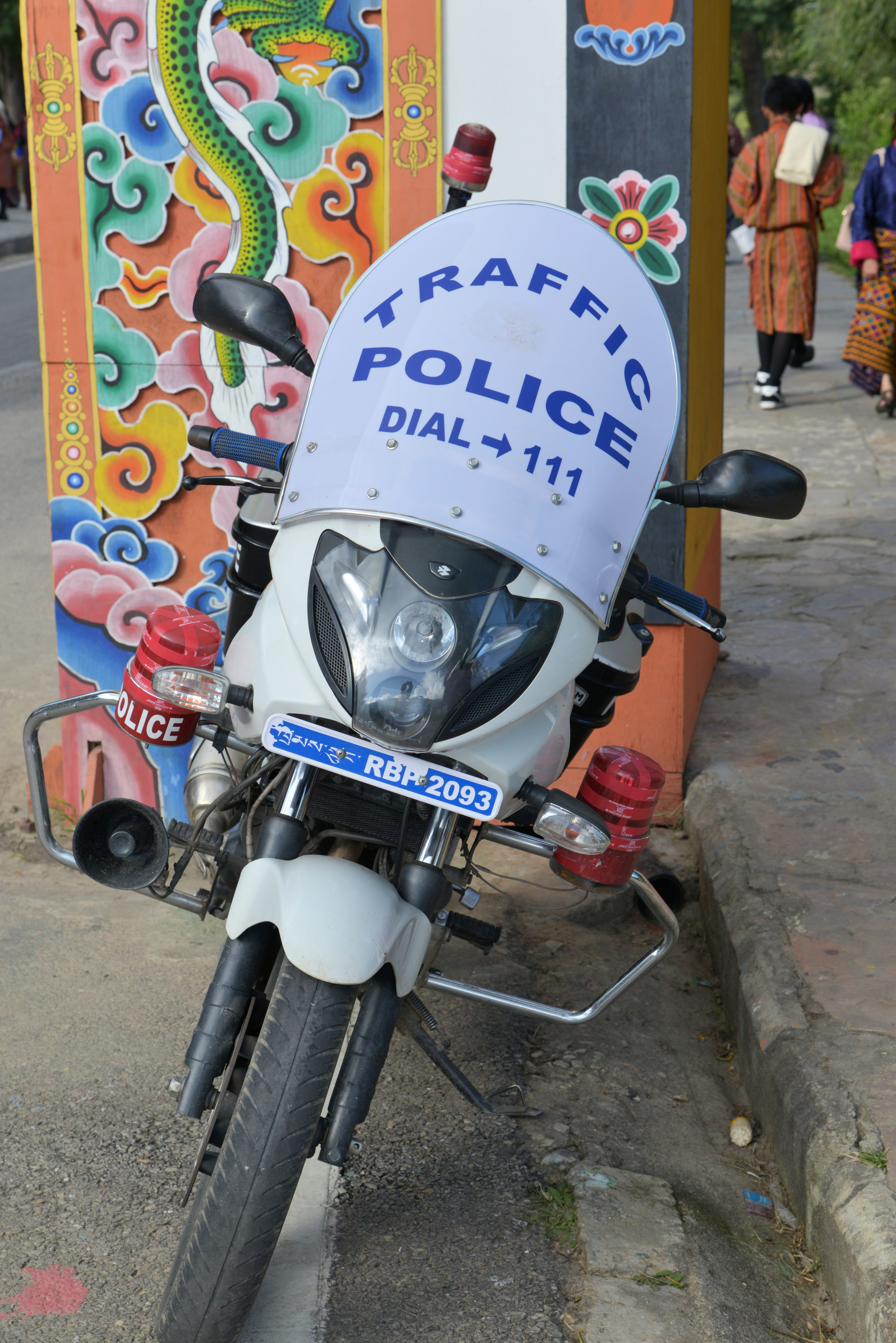
Bhutan traffic police motorcycle.

Bhutan has a low crime rate. Incidents of petty crime are occasionally reported in the country. Violent crime is very uncommon. Some cases of drug abuse are reported; alcohol abuse is a problem. But in general, drug trafficking is low. The most serious threat to Bhutan's security is terrorism by different terrorist groups from neighboring countries illegally camped in the nation.

== Background ==
Serious crimes were very uncommon in Bhutan throughout most of the 20th century. There were reports of increased criminal activity since the 1980s and early 1990s. The main causes of the rise in crime are the influx of foreign laborers, widening economic disparities, and more contact with foreign cultures.

In June 1999, television was introduced in the country and Bhutan became the last nation in the world to have television. The introduction of television is often regarded as incompatible with Bhutanese culture and a cause behind the increase in crime. An editorial in Kuensel, the national newspaper of Bhutan, suggested:

We are seeing for the first time broken families, school dropouts and other negative youth crimes. We are beginning to see crime associated with drug users all over the world - shoplifting, burglary and violence."

A study conducted by some Bhutanese academics found that cable television has caused strong desire for western products among the people of the country and resulted in the increase in crime rate.

== Non-political crime ==
Violent crime is extremely low in Bhutan. Levels of theft are low. Petty crime like pickpocketing are occasionally reported in the country. Juvenile crime has relatively increased; the highest rate of juvenile crime was reported in 2003, and 63 youths were convicted across the nation. Rape is not an extensive problem; in 1999 only 10 incidents of rape were reported in Bhutan. Homicide rate is low. In 1998, homicide rate per 100,000 citizens was 2.78. Bhutan is a source and transit country for human trafficking. Women are trafficked from Bhutan to other countries for commercial sexual exploitation. But Bhutan is not a destination country; women from other nations are not trafficked into Bhutan.

In April 2002, Bhutan suffered a wave of crime. Although there were some reports of fraud, violence and few cases of homicide from many towns and villages, Bhutan never experienced serious violation of law before it. The first case of corruption in Bhutan was reported on April 5, 2002, when Parop Tshering, a 42-year-old chief accountant of the State Trading Corporation, was charged with embezzlement. Four cases of white-collar crime and violent crime were reported in April 2003.

In the Corruption Perceptions Index 2012, Bhutan is ranked 33rd out of 174 countries for corruption (least corrupt countries are at the top of the list). Bhutan ranks as the least corrupt nation in South Asia and sixth least corrupt in Asia (after, in order, Singapore, Hong Kong, Japan, Qatar and UAE).

== Drug-related crime ==
Slight drug abuse has appeared in the country. Free trade with neighboring India, presence of porous borders and the refugee population make Bhutan vulnerable to drug trafficking. Bhutan has proximity to certain areas in Nepal and North-East India where intravenous drug use is relatively high. Due to such geographical location, Bhutan also becomes vulnerable to an increase in intravenous drug use. Marijuana, which grows as a shrub in Bhutan, was only used to feed pigs before the introduction of television. But hundreds were arrested in recent years for using marijuana. Use of amphetamines and benzodiazepines smuggled from India is rising in Thimphu and in the Southern Bhutan. However, drug trafficking and production of opium, cannabis and other drugs is not any significant problem in the country.

Alcohol consumption is the most serious addiction related problem in the nation. Alcohol abuse is reported in nearly 80% cases associated with domestic violence.

There are some characteristics of the situation on drug abuse in Bhutan.

- Most of the users of narcotic substances are male and students.
- Majority of the narcotic users are under the age of twenty-five.
- A growing portion of the youth population use multiple drugs.
- Some cases of intravenous drug use are reported in Bhutan, but it is minimal compared to other countries in the region.
- A social stigma is attached to addiction in the country. Because of this, the full nature of the situation becomes difficult to know.

The Government of Bhutan has taken several measures to counter these problems. Bhutan is a party of the United Nations Convention Against Illicit Traffic in Narcotic Drugs and Psychotropic Substances (1988). Many laws have been enacted which include the Civil and Criminal Procedure Code (2000), the Sales Tax, Customs and Excise Act (2000), the Medicines Act (2003), the Penal Code of Bhutan (2004), and the Narcotic Drugs and Psychotropic Substances and Substance Abuse Act (2005). In 2004, selling of tobacco products to Bhutanese citizens was outlawed in the country and thus Bhutan became the first nation in the world to ban tobacco sales. Severe punishment was introduced for selling of tobacco. A fine of $210 was imposed for the culprits and cancellation of business licenses for owners of shops and hotels illegally selling tobacco. Karma Tshering of the Bhutanese Customs said, "If any foreigner is caught selling tobacco products to Bhutanese nationals, he will be charged with smuggling. Tobacco will be treated as contraband." However a black market in tobacco has flourished in the country.

== Terrorism ==
Terrorism is not a significant security concern in Bhutan, and according to South Asia Terrorism Portal, a fatal terror attack has not occurred since 2008.

Many insurgent groups from neighboring countries have set up training camps in the southern part of the country. The United Liberation Front of Asom (ULFA), the National Democratic Front of Bodoland (NDFB) and the Bodo Liberation Tigers Force (BLTF) had bases in Bhutan in 2002. Terrorists were involved in murders, extortion and kidnappings. Under increasing pressure from the Government of India, Bhutan issued an ultimatum to the terrorists for leaving the country by December 2001, and in December 2003, the Royal Bhutan Army, aided by the Special Frontier Force, launched a military campaign. Many terrorist camps were destroyed in the operation. It is suspected that terrorists are trying to make retaliatory attacks against Bhutan. On September 5, 2004, a bomb exploded in Gelephu killing two people and injuring twenty seven. The NDFB was suspected behind the attack. On December 30, 2008, the United Revolutionary Front of Bhutan bombed a vehicle carrying forest rangers and shot at the passengers, killing four rangers. Two wounded foresters managed to escape and alerted police about the incident.

The Government of Bhutan has taken several legal and military actions for combating terrorism. On September 4, 2004, one hundred and eleven people received various sentences ranging from four years to life imprisonment for helping terrorist organizations camped illegally in Bhutan. The offenders included civil servants, businesspersons, and laborers.

== See also ==
- Royal Bhutan Police
- Law enforcement in Bhutan
- Judicial system of Bhutan
