= Bhutanese passport =

Travel document of the Kingdom of Bhutan

- The front cover of an ordinary (blue) Bhutanese passport
- Type: Passport
- Issued by: Bhutan
- First issued: c. 2006 (current version)
- Purpose: Identification
- Eligibility: Bhutanese citizenship
- Expiration: Ten years

A Bhutanese passport is a document which authorizes and facilitates travel and other activities in Bhutan or by Bhutanese citizens. Foreign travel passports are issued to citizens of Bhutan for international travel by the Ministry of Foreign Affairs. It is valid for all countries unless otherwise endorsed.

== History ==
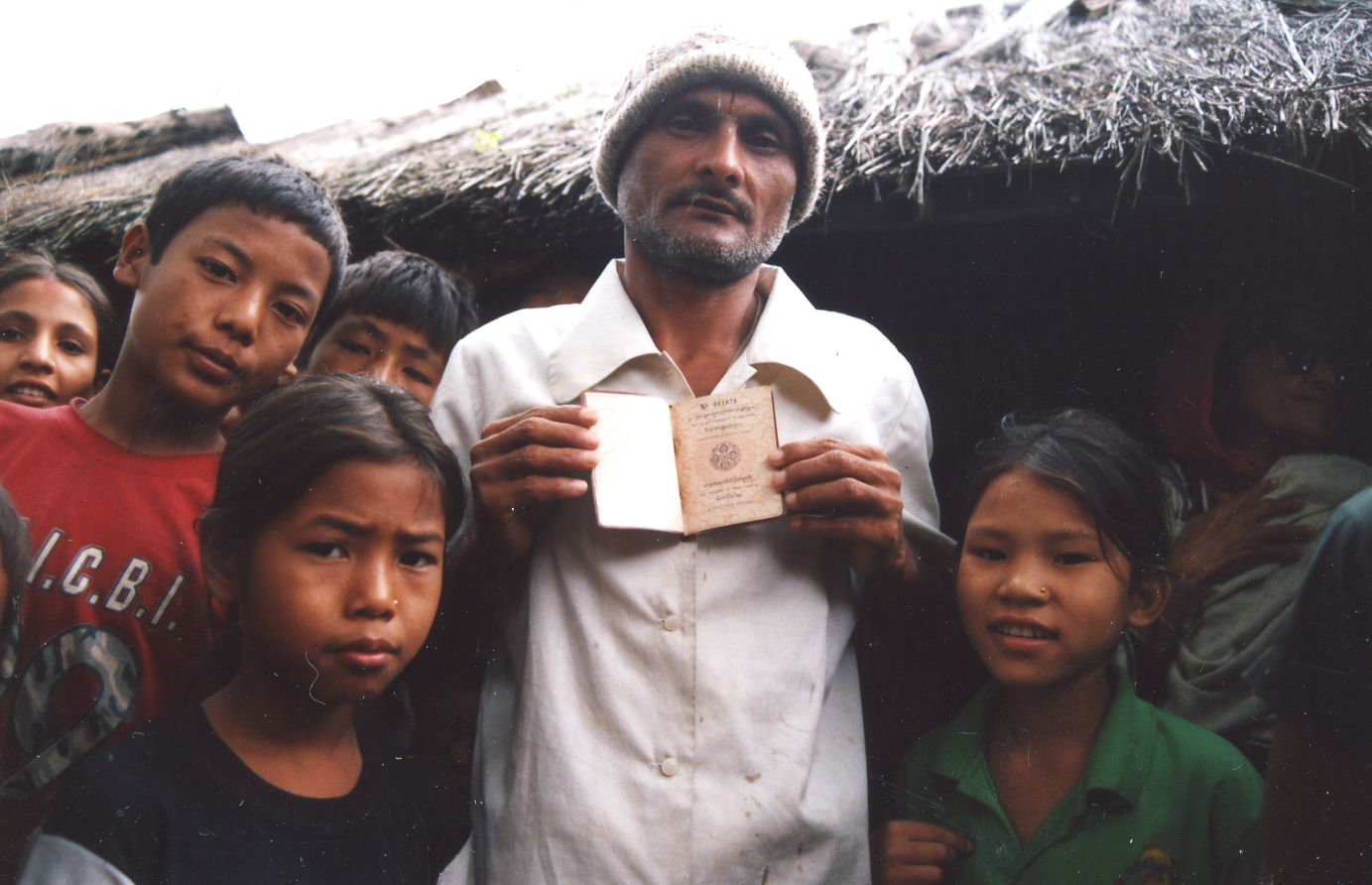
A Lhotshampa man holding his Bhutanese passport in a Beldangi camp, October 2007

Within the Kingdom of Bumthang, which was a political entity within the borders of modern Bhutan, feudal passbooks or dzeng (Dzongkha: ཛེང) were issued beginning in the 15th century to court messengers in order to travel between kingdoms. Diplomacy and mediation were important measures between pre-modern Bhutanese polities.

In 1988, Bhutanese passport holders abroad were ordered to surrender their passports upon their return to Bhutan.

The current version of the Bhutanese passports were first issued around 2006.

== Languages ==
The passport contains text in English and Dzongkha.

== Types of passport ==
Overview of Bhutanese passports
Type of passport	Color	Image
Ordinary passport (Dzongkha: ་དགེ་འདུན་, romanized: Shinthron)	Blue	
Official passport (Dzongkha: དབྱངས།་, romanized: Pawchang)	Green	
Diplomatic passport (Dzongkha: ཞག་དང་རྣ, romanized: Denzhen)	Red	

== Visa requirements ==
As of 2024, Bhutanese citizens have visa-free or visa on arrival access to 52 countries and territories, ranking the Bhutanese passport 92nd in the world according to the Henley Passport Index, together with Chad and Comoros.

Visa requirements for Bhutanese citizens Bhutan Freedom of movement Visa not required Visa on arrival eVisa Visa available both on arrival or online Visa required

== In popular culture ==
In 2013, a Wikipedia user claiming to be Bhutanese and a native speaker of Dzongkha added a spoken article audio file to the Bhutanese passport article on the English Wikipedia. The processing used on the audio was considered humorous by internet commentators, spawning an internet meme. Following debate on the article's talk page, the audio file was deleted in 2015.

Bhutanese passport
The original spoken article audio that has since become an internet meme

== See also ==
- List of passports
- Visa policy of Bhutan
- Visa requirements for Bhutanese citizens
- Bhutanese Citizenship Act 1985
