= List of countries by number of diplomatic missions =

Vikimedya List Article

The following list sorts 65 countries according to their number of diplomatic missions in 2024. Also indicated are the number of different missions abroad such as embassies, consulates, permanent missions and of other diplomatic representations. All data is from the Global Diplomacy Index 2024 of the Lowy Institute.

Rank	Country	Total number of posts	Embassies/ High Commissions	Consulates/ Consulates-General	Permanent missions	Other representations
1	China	274	173	91	8	2
2	United States	271	168	83	11	8
3	Turkey	252	145	93	12	2
4	Japan	251	152	66	10	23
5	France	249	158	72	18	1
6	Russia	230	143	74	10	3
7	United Kingdom	225	156	51	11	7
8	Germany	225	154	57	12	2
9	Spain	218	116	91	10	1
10	Italy	206	124	74	8	0
11	Brazil	205	135	58	12	2
12	India	201	142	50	5	4
13	South Korea	187	114	60	5	8
14	Mexico	161	80	71	8	2
15	Canada	157	98	38	11	10
16	Argentina	150	87	54	7	2
17	Netherlands	149	106	28	10	5
-	European Union	143	132	0	8	3
18	Switzerland	141	102	30	7	2
19	Hungary	140	87	43	7	3
20	Poland	135	91	33	9	2
21	Greece	134	85	39	9	1
22	Indonesia	130	92	34	3	1
23	Saudi Arabia	128	104	19	4	1
24	Portugal	127	75	42	9	1
25	Australia	124	85	33	4	2
26	Pakistan	121	89	29	3	0
27	Chile	121	73	41	6	1
28	Czech Republic	120	91	16	7	6
29	Colombia	117	63	49	5	0
30	South Africa	114	98	12	2	2
31	Belgium	113	83	18	8	4
32	Taiwan	110	12	1	1	96
33	Israel	107	80	21	5	1
34	Malaysia	106	78	24	3	1
35	Austria	104	83	13	6	2
36	Sweden	102	87	8	7	0
37	Ireland	98	71	20	6	1
38	Thailand	97	65	28	3	1
39	Vietnam	94	67	22	4	1
40	Philippines	94	63	27	4	0
41	Norway	91	74	7	9	1
42	Finland	90	74	6	7	3
43	Denmark	90	66	16	6	2
44	Slovakia	82	63	9	8	2
45	Bangladesh	80	58	20	2	0
46	New Zealand	68	49	15	3	1
47	Lithuania	62	42	11	8	1
48	Sri Lanka	60	46	12	1	1
49	Slovenia	58	43	7	7	1
50	Costa Rica	52	42	5	4	1
51	Mongolia	50	33	13	1	1
52	Singapore	50	29	16	4	1
53	Latvia	47	38	1	7	0
54	Estonia	46	38	2	6	0
55	Myanmar	46	38	6	2	0
56	Luxembourg	46	35	4	6	1
57	North Korea	43	39	1	3	0
58	Cambodia	43	28	12	3	0
59	Brunei	42	35	4	3	0
60	Nepal	40	32	7	1	0
61	Laos	40	26	11	3	0
62	Timor-Leste	31	23	5	3	0
63	Iceland	26	17	4	5	0
64	Papua New Guinea	21	16	4	1	0
65	Bhutan	10	6	3	1	0

== Notes ==
- ^1 The European Union (EU) is an economic and political union of 27 Member States. As the EU is not a country, the EU is not ranked country on the list.
