= Canadians in Lebanon =

Total population
- 45,000

Regions with significant populations
- Beirut

Languages
- French · English · Lebanese Arabic

Religion
- Roman Catholicism · Greek Orthodox · Other Christians · Islam

Related ethnic groups
- Canadian diaspora

Canadians in Lebanon consists mostly of Canadians of Lebanese origin who returned to the country as well as expatriates from Canada. According to Canada's Department of Foreign Affairs and International Trade, there are about 45,000 Canadians living in Lebanon.

== History ==
In the 1980s, thousands of Lebanese fled their country during the Lebanese Civil War and settled in Canada. With the return of relative stability to the country in recent years, it has become increasingly common for members of Canada's Lebanese community to return to their homeland, most commonly for summer vacations, but also to take up residence. Most of these returnees have dual Canadian-Lebanese citizenship.

=== 2006 Lebanon War ===
Many Canadians left Lebanon and returned to Canada in the wake of the 2006 Lebanon War as their houses and businesses have been destroyed during the conflict and they have no resources.

== See also ==
- Lebanese Canadian
- Canada–Lebanon relations
