= Atlantic Gateway =

Atlantic Gateway can refer to three different infrastructure projects:

- Atlantic Gateway (Canada)
- Atlantic Gateway (North West England)
- Atlantic Gateway (Virginia)
