= Ashcroft Terminal =

Ashcroft Terminal is a dry port and private inland transloading, container storage and distribution centre and member of the Canadian Government's Asian Pacific Corridor Initiative in Ashcroft, British Columbia. Located 340 km (210 mi) east of Vancouver and 90 km (56 mi) west of Kamloops, Ashcroft Terminal is situated on mainlines for both Canadian Pacific Railway (CPR) and Canadian National Railway (CN).

== History ==
Ashcroft Terminal has been in operation since 1997. Rapid expansion during the 2000s, thanks in large part to federal investment, has increased the inland port's operations, infrastructure and capacity.

=== Asia Pacific Gateway and Corridor Initiative ===
On October 11, 2006, Prime Minister Stephen Harper announced the Asia-Pacific Gateway and Corridor Initiative (APGCI) with an initial investment of $5-million in federal funding. The expansion facilitated by the investment ensured increased capacity and access for shippers and logistics companies in the entire province.

In September 2013 the development of an online platform financed by the federal government was announced by Thompson-Nicola Regional District. The websites showcases the regional economy, highlighting investment opportunities, including in agriculture, mining and forestry with Ashcroft Terminal featured prominently.

== Operations and infrastructure ==
Ashcroft Terminal is located on 129 hectares of industrial zoned land with 141 hectares of surrounding buffer land. Onsite operations include:

- Transloading
- Railcar Storage
- Materials Handling
- Industrial Storage
- Truck Scales

The terminal contains over 30,000 feet (9,100 m) of rail serviced directly off the CPR, servicing both CP and CN shippers through a zone 3 CTA interswitch.

== See also ==
- Asia-Pacific Gateway and Corridor Initiative
- Inland port
