= List of diplomatic missions in Bhutan =

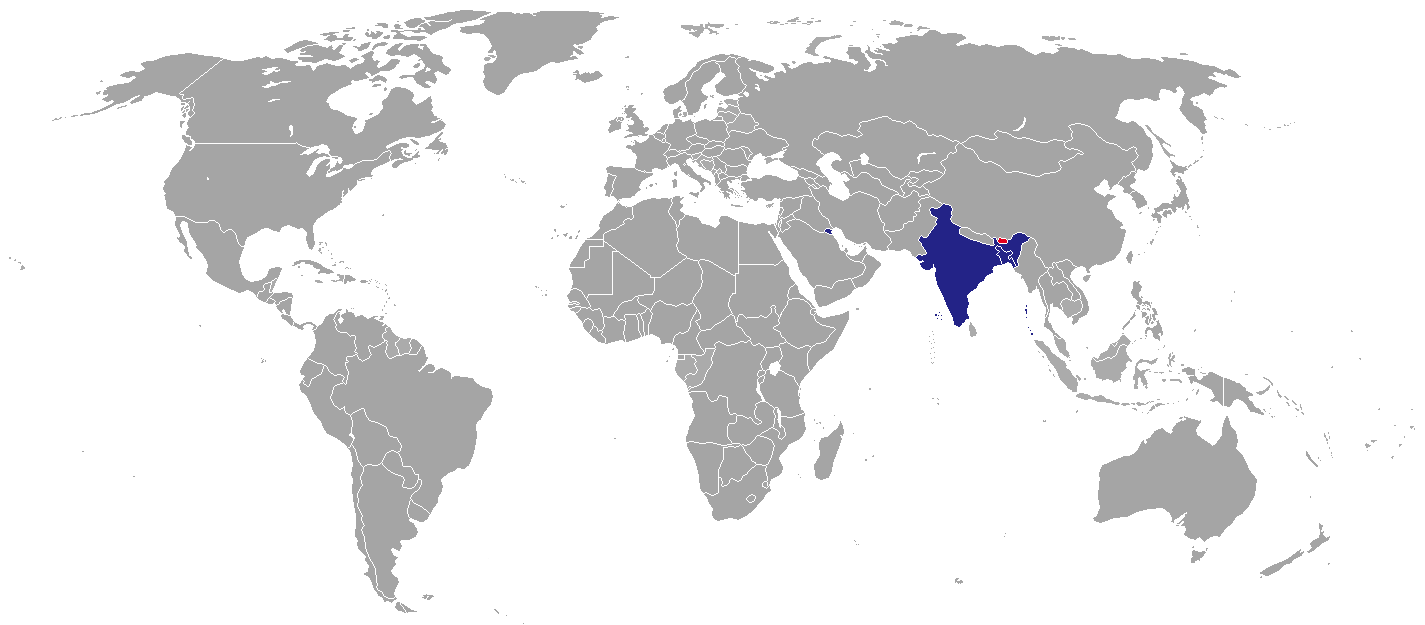
Map of diplomatic missions in Bhutan

This is a list of diplomatic missions in Bhutan. At present, Bhutan hosts only three embassies, the joint-fourth-fewest of any sovereign state after Liechtenstein, which has none, and Andorra and Tuvalu, which have two each. Many countries accredit an embassy in another country additionally to Bhutan, with New Delhi, India hosting many such embassies.

Honorary consulates are omitted from this listing.

== Embassies in Thimphu ==
1. Bangladesh
2. India
3. Kuwait

== Consulates-General in Phuntsholing ==
- India

== Non-resident embassies accredited to Bhutan ==
=== Resident in New Delhi, India ===
- Afghanistan
- Argentina
- Australia
- Austria
- Azerbaijan
- Bahrain
- Belgium
- Brazil
- Canada
- Colombia
- Cuba
- Czech Republic
- Denmark
- Egypt
- European Union
- Fiji
- Finland
- Germany
- Indonesia
- Israel
- Japan
- Kazakhstan
- Lesotho
- Mongolia
- Morocco
- Myanmar
- Nepal
- Netherlands
- Norway
- Oman
- Philippines
- Poland
- Qatar
- Serbia
- Singapore
- Slovakia
- Slovenia
- Spain
- Sweden
- Switzerland
- Turkey
- United Arab Emirates
- Vietnam

=== Resident in Dhaka, Bangladesh ===
- Maldives
- Pakistan
- South Korea
- Sri Lanka
- Thailand

== See also ==
- Foreign relations of Bhutan
- List of diplomatic missions of Bhutan
