= Asia Pacific Foundation of Canada =

Canadian think tank

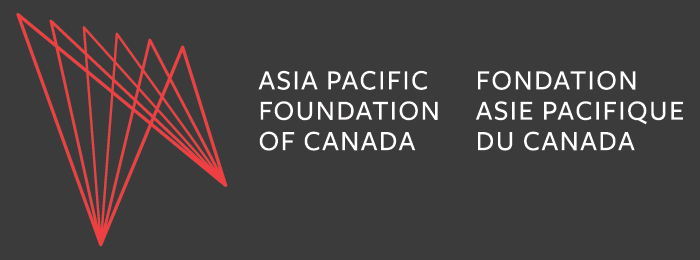
- Formation: 1984; 42 years ago
- Location(s): Offices in Vancouver and Toronto
- President & Ceo: Jeff Nankivell
- Website: www.asiapacific.ca

The Asia Pacific Foundation of Canada (APF Canada, French: Fondation Asie Pacifique du Canada), created by an Act of Parliament in 1984, is an independent, not-for-profit think-tank on Canada's relations with Asia.

Based in Vancouver, with a secondary office in Toronto, APF Canada functions as a knowledge broker, providing current and comprehensive research, analysis and information on Canada's transpacific relations. The Foundation promotes dialogue on economic, security, political and social issues, fostering informed decision-making in the Canadian public, private and non-governmental sectors. APF Canada also provides grants to support policy research and informed discussion on Canada's relations with Asia.

== History of the Foundation ==
The Asia Pacific Foundation of Canada was created as part of the Canadian government's growing interest in relations with Asia under the administrations of Prime Minister Pierre Trudeau. Its inception in 1984 was led by the Department of External Affairs, and was specifically proposed by the director general of the Department's Asian and Pacific bureau, Tom Delworth. At the time the Department was headed by Secretary of State for External Affairs Joe Clark. Soon after, Vancouver businessman John Bruk was commissioned by the Department to undertake a study of the proposal. His report was accepted and became the basis for the founding Act. Mr. Bruk became the founding Chairman. The founders aimed to create an independent source of thought on Canada's trade, investment and political relations with Asia. This came amidst the growing perception of Canada as a Pacific country, compared with its relations being conducted primarily by the Eastern provinces across the Atlantic. As a result, it was mandated that the Foundation's primary office should always be in Vancouver, British Columbia as to promote relations with Asia across the Pacific. This idea was the premise for the creation of the Asia–Pacific Gateway and Corridor Initiative, whose mission is to establish Canada's Asia–Pacific Gateway and Corridor as the best transportation network facilitating global supply chains between North America and Asia.

The Foundation was initially funded on short-term plans or for specific projects with contributions from both the Federal and Provincial governments, as well as by corporate and private donors. In 2005 a founding supporter of the Foundation, Senator Jack Austin, led an initiative to award the Foundation a C$50-million endowment from the Government of Canada, from which it now draws much of its funding, in addition to private and corporate donations.

== Mandate ==
The Asia Pacific Foundation of Canada (APF Canada) is a not-for-profit organization focused on Canada's relations with Asia. Its mission is to be Canada's catalyst for engagement with Asia and Asia's bridge to Canada. A leader in research and analysis on Canada-Asia relations for over 30 years, APF Canada partners with government, business leaders, academics, and opinion makers in Canada and across the Asia Pacific region to offer clear, specific, and actionable policy advice.

APF Canada's thematic priorities include: promoting trade, investment, and innovation; advancing sustainability; building skills and competencies; and, understanding Asia now.

== Governance ==
The affairs of the Foundation are managed by a Board of Directors. The Board consists of a Chairperson and up to six other directors appointed by the Governor in Council; up to 18 additional directors appointed by the Board after consultation with provincial governments and other interested outside parties; and the President of the Foundation. The Chairperson and each of the Board members is appointed for a term of three years, and may serve a maximum of three terms. The Board, which has ultimate responsibility for the Foundation's activities, meets at least twice a year. It is responsible for setting the strategic directions of the Foundation, management of the endowment fund, and appointment of the President.

=== Former Heads ===
- Yuen Pau Woo

== Affiliations ==
- Canada participates in the Pacific Economic Cooperation Council (PECC) through the Canadian Committee for Pacific Economic Cooperation (CANCPEC), which is administered by the Foundation.
- The Foundation serves as the secretariat for Canada's APEC Business Advisory Council (ABAC) members, providing research, analysis, and administrative support.
- The Foundation is the APEC Study Centre for Canada, a role the Foundation was given by the Government of Canada in 1995. As the Study Centre, the Foundation produces research papers and commentary on priority issues for Canada's involvement in APEC.
