= Kunzang C. Namgyel =

Bhutanese diplomat

Her Excellency Kunzang C. Namgyel
- In office January 3, 2014 – August 28, 2017
- Preceded by: Lhatu Wangchuk
- Succeeded by: Doma Tshering

Personal details
- Children: Four
- Profession: Civil servant

Kunzang Chhoden Namgyel became Bhutan's first female ambassador and the country's permanent representative to the United Nations in January 2014.

== Personal life ==
Namgyel is a Bhutanese. She is married and she has four children, three daughters and a son.

== Education ==
Namgyel pursued her graduation in Arts from Lady Keane College in Shillong affiliated to the North Eastern Hill University, India.

== Career ==
In March 1980, Namgyel joined the Foreign Affairs Ministry. Since then she has held various positions over her career spanning four decades.

Some notable postings are listed as:

- Director for Bhutan at the SAARC Secretariat, Kathmandu, Nepal from October 1995 to March 1999
- Minister Counselor and Deputy Permanent Representative, Permanent Mission of the Kingdom of Bhutan to the United Nations, Geneva from July 2003 to July, 2007
- Chief of Protocol, Ministry of Foreign Affairs, Thimphu, from August 2007 to May 2009
- Director, Multilateral Department, Ministry of Foreign Affairs, Thimphu from June 2009 to August, 2011
- Ambassador Deputy Permanent Representative, Permanent Mission of the Kingdom of Bhutan to the United Nations, New York from September, 2011 until she was appointed the ambassador and permanent representative

On January 3, 2014, she became the first woman Foreign Service officer of Bhutan appointed by a royal decree as the ambassador to United Nations. She succeeded Lhatu Wangchuk who was the Permanent Representative from early 2009 to 2013.

In November 2014, Namgyel led the Bhutanese Delegation in the second United Nations conference on Landlocked developing countries in Vienna, Austria. In the conference, Namgyel presided over the third general session of the conference. Through her statement, she highlighted the challenges that Bhutan faces as a landlocked nation. She asked the attendees to enable and promote economic growth so that the nation as a whole can build on its economy.

On April 22, 2016, Bhutan signed the Paris Agreement in New York for climate change under Namgyel's tenure as the ambassador. In her statement, Namgyel shared that Bhutan is vulnerable to the climatic changes and this agreement is a collective fight towards protecting the climate. She said that Bhutan as a nation is committed to the cause and also urged other 174 participating nations who signed the agreement to support Bhutan in this fight.

Her tenure as Permanent Representative of Bhutan to the United Nations in New York lasted until August 2017. In August 2017, Namgyel she took the position of the Chief of Protocol in Ministry of Foreign Affairs of Bhutan.
