= Asia–Pacific Gateway and Corridor Initiative =

The Asia–Pacific Gateway and Corridor Initiative is an integrated set of investment and policy measures of the Canadian federal government that are focused on trade with the Asia–Pacific Region.

== Asia–Pacific Gateway and Corridor ==
The Asia–Pacific Gateway and Corridor is a system of transportation infrastructure, including British Columbia Lower Mainland and Prince Rupert ports, road and rail connections that reach across Western Canada and into the economic heartlands of North America, as well as major airports and border crossings.

== Mission and activities ==
The mission of the Initiative is to establish Canada's Asia-Pacific Gateway and Corridor as the best transportation network facilitating global supply chains between North America and Asia.

The Initiative is led by Transport Canada and its international marketing is done by the Department of Foreign Affairs and International Trade. Western Economic Diversification Canada facilitates Gateway discussion and funding in the four Western Canadian provinces of British Columbia, Alberta, Saskatchewan and Manitoba. Other government agencies are also involved in the development and realization of the goals of the Initiative.

Outside of government, much of the policy research on Gateway issues is conducted by the Asia Pacific Foundation of Canada. The Foundation has been a longtime advocate for a coordinated and comprehensive approach to the development of the Asia-Pacific Gateway and works with both the federal and provincial governments by leading public discussions and by disseminating information from its research activities.

The Asia–Pacific Gateway and Corridor Initiative is one of three gateway projects initiated by the government. The others are the Ontario–Quebec Continental Gateway and Trade Corridor and the Atlantic Gateway. All three were created under the National Policy Framework for Strategic Gateways and Trade Corridors.

== See also ==
- Western Economic Diversification Canada
- Transport Canada
- Asia Pacific Foundation of Canada
- Ashcroft Terminal
