= Bhutan–Nepal relations =

- Bhutan: Nepal

Relations between Bhutan and Nepal were formally established in 1983. Both Himalayan countries are landlocked, separated only by the Indian State of Sikkim. Both countries are bordered by India and the People's Republic of China. However, the current state of relations remains strained owing to the Bhutanese refugee crisis.

== Status ==
Bhutan and Nepal are both Himalayan countries and until 2008, Nepal was also a monarchy. Both nations are founding members of the South Asian Association for Regional Cooperation (SAARC). The Nepal–Bhutan Friendship and Cultural Society was established in Kathmandu to facilitate good relations in 1969. The two nations had formally established diplomatic relations in 1983. Bhutanese King Jigme Singye Wangchuck visited Nepal to attend the 3rd SAARC summit in 1987. Nepal's late King Birendra visited Bhutan to attend a SAARC meeting in 1988. More recently, the Prime Minister of Bhutan visited Nepal in 2002. PM Tshering Tobgay of Bhutan visited Nepal on 2015 to attend a SAARC summit.

== Refugee crisis ==
A major issue confronting both nations is the presence of Bhutanese refugees, residing in seven UNHCR camps in eastern Nepal. Estimates of their numbers vary from 85,000 to 107,000. While most refugees claim Bhutanese nationality, Bhutan claims that they are "voluntary emigrants" who forfeited their citizenship rights, denying their refugee status. Most of the refugees are Lhotshampa – Nepali-speaking Hindus of Nepalese descent who had settled in Bhutan. Several insurgent groups, including those with Maoist affiliations, have arisen from the refugee camps, whom Bhutanese security forces blamed for a series of bombings in Bhutan before the 2008 parliamentary elections. After years of talks and efforts produced no results, several other nations, most notably the United States agreed to absorb 60,000 refugees.

== Trade ==
The growth of trade between the two nations has been affected by the refugee crisis. In 2008–09, Bhutan's exports to Nepal stood at Rs. 300 million, while Nepal's exports to Bhutan amounted to Rs. 200 million. In 2004, Nepal and Bhutan signed an agreement to increase the number of flights between Paro and Kathmandu from twice a week to seven flights a week. Delegations of chambers of business of both nations have exchanged visits, and in 2010 both nations held joint secretary-level talks to work towards a trade agreement.

== See also ==
- South Asian Association for Regional Cooperation (SAARC)
