= Bhutan–Canada relations =

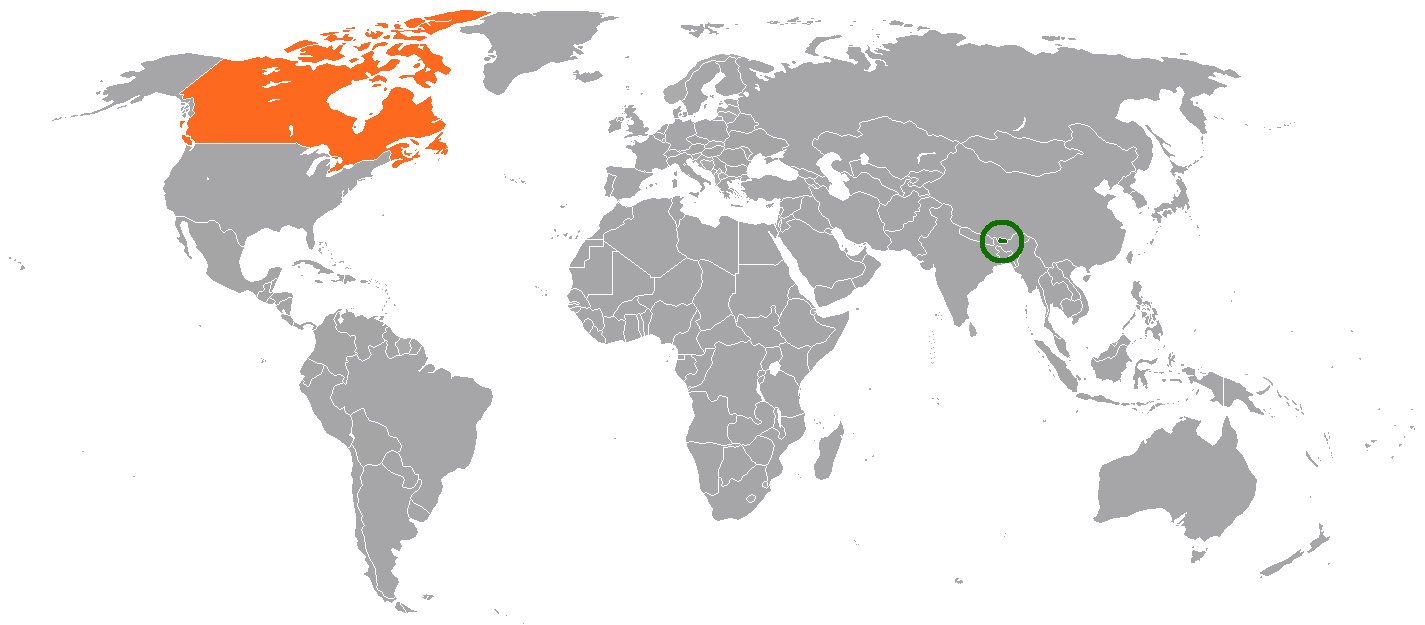

- Bhutan: Canada

Diplomatic mission
- New York: New Delhi

Bhutan has held official relations with Canada since 2003. While neither country has a resident ambassador, the Canadian High Commission in New Delhi serves as the consular representative of Canada for Bhutan. Bhutan's mission is located in the Bhutanese Mission to the United Nations in New York. The two nations have been described as holding warm ties.

== History ==
The relationship started in the 1960s, when the Canadian Jesuit William Mackey built Bhutan's first high school. Mackey and several other Canadians would later proceed to found Bhutan's education system.

Canada became the 22nd country to establish bilateral relations with Bhutan in 2003. On August 10, 2009, Joseph Caron visited the Tashichhodzong on behalf of the Canadian government.

In 2018, Canada and Bhutan celebrated 15 years of diplomatic relations.

== Bhutanese Canadians ==
According to Ambassador Nadir Patel, 4000 Bhutanese people live in Canada. However, the Canadian Government records a number of at least 6,000 Bhutanese refugees.

The largest Bhutanese Canadian community is located in Lethbridge, Alberta.
