= Canada–Lebanon relations =

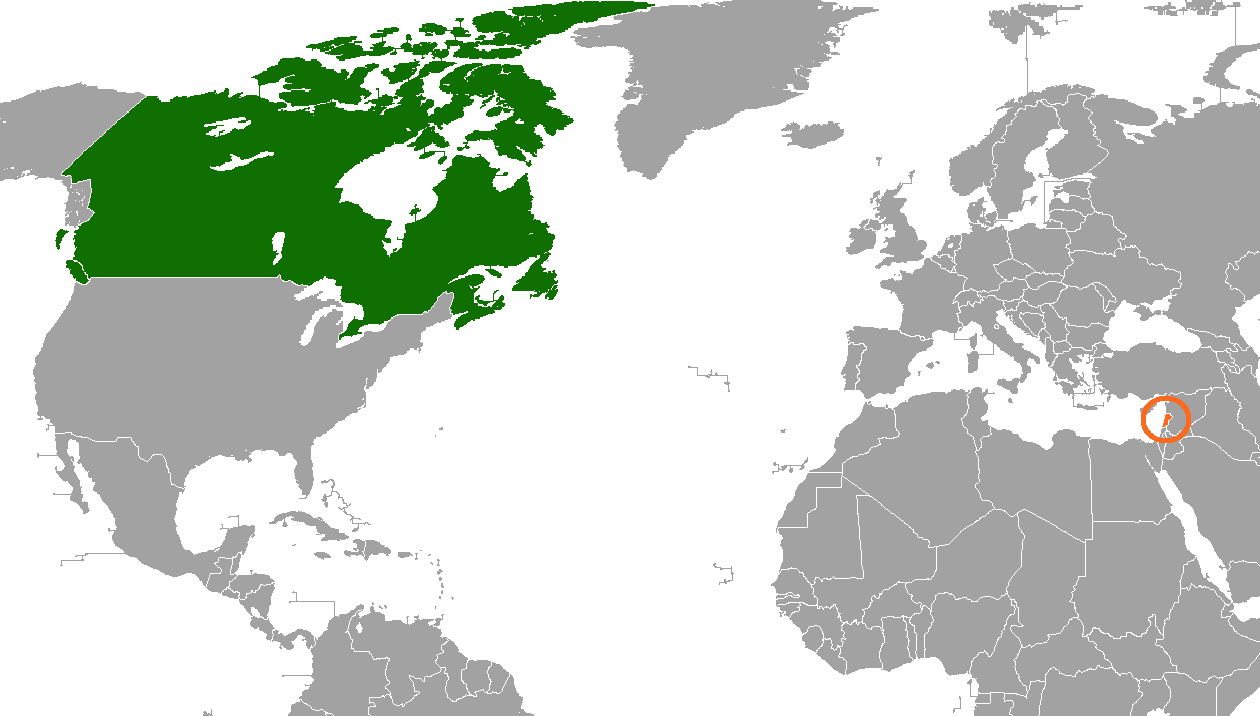

- Canada: Lebanon

Ties between Canada and Lebanon date back to the Ottoman Empire; however, formal bilateral relations were first established in 1954. Canada is home to one of the largest Lebanese diaspora communities. Both nations are members of the Organisation internationale de la Francophonie and the United Nations.

== History ==
The first Lebanese migration to Canada took place in 1882 when Lebanon was still part of the Ottoman Empire. In 1946, soon after obtaining independence from France, Lebanon opened a consulate in Montreal. In 1949, the consulate was upgraded to a consulate-general. In 1954, Canada recognized and established diplomatic relations with Lebanon. In 1958, both nations opened embassies in each other's capitals, respectively.

Between 1975 and 1990, Lebanon entered into a civil war between various religious factions in the country. In 1985 Canada closed its embassy in Beirut. During the war, Canada received thousands of Lebanese refugees which made Lebanon the largest Arab diaspora community in Canada. Canada re-opened its embassy in Beirut in 1995.

There are approximately 190,000 Canadians of Lebanese descent in Canada and 45,000 Canadians residing in Lebanon. The evacuation in 2006 during the Israel–Hezbollah War of Canadians from Lebanon was the largest in Canada's history and spoke of the importance of this diaspora community.

Since 2016, Canada has contributed almost US$250 million to support Lebanon's stability and resilience as it copes with hosting the more than 1.5 million Syrian refugees that have been added to the country's already existing refugee population, which also includes Palestinians, Iraqis and Kurds. Canada has increased its diplomatic presence in Lebanon, also in response to the crisis.

== High-level visits ==
Prime Ministerial visits from Canada to Lebanon

- Prime Minister Jean Chrétien (2002)

Prime Ministerial and Presidential visits from Lebanon to Canada

- President Amine Gemayel (1987)
- Prime Minister Rafik Hariri (1997)
- President Émile Lahoud (1999)
- President Michel Sleiman (2008)

== Bilateral relations ==
Both nations have signed several bilateral agreements such as a Foreign Investment Protection Agreement (1997); Air Transport Agreement (1998) and a Memorandum of Understanding Agreement (2013) to strengthen trade and investment cooperation between the two countries.

== Trade ==
In 2018, total trade between Canada and Lebanon totaled US$150 million. Canada's main exports to Lebanon include: vehicle parts, agri-foods (in particular wheat and legumes), pharmaceuticals and other industrial and consumer goods. Lebanon's main exports to Canada include: preserved food, beverages, coffee and spices, olive oil and sugar and confectionery.

== Resident diplomatic missions ==
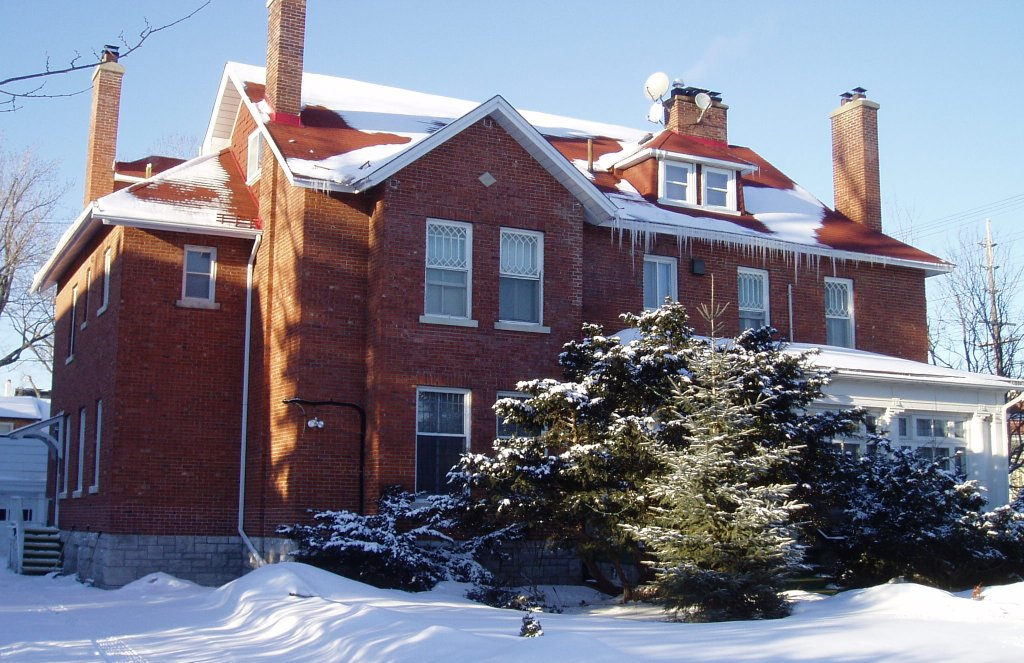
Embassy of Lebanon in Ottawa

- Canada has an embassy in Beirut.
- Lebanon has an embassy in Ottawa and a consulate-general in Montreal.

== See also ==
- Foreign relations of Canada
- Foreign relations of Lebanon
- Canadians in Lebanon
- Canadians of convenience
- Lebanese Canadians
