= Lebanese Canadians =

Canadians of Lebanese origin

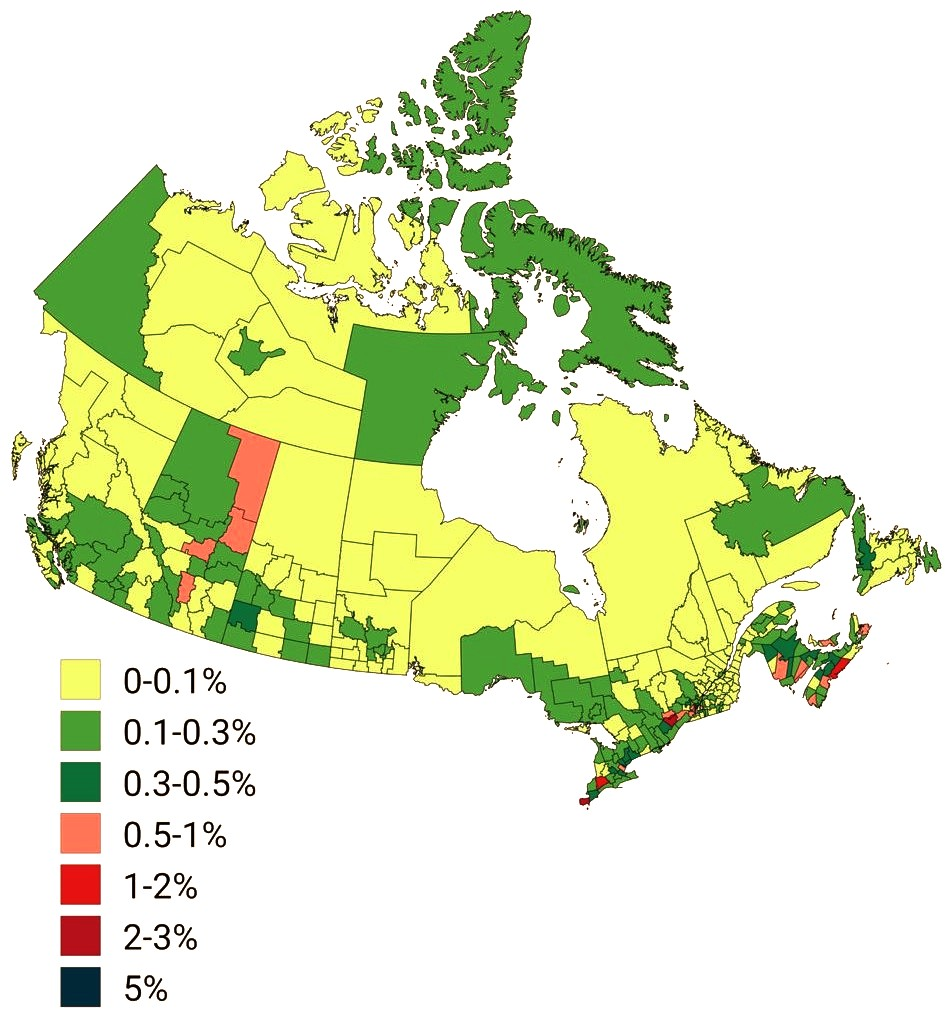
- Population distribution of Lebanese Canadians by census division, 2021 census

Total population
- 210,605 (by ancestry, 2021 census)

Regions with significant populations
- Ontario: 80,345
- Quebec: 78,210
- Alberta: 28,480
- British Columbia: 8,440

Languages
- Canadian English, Canadian French, Lebanese Arabic, Lebanese French, Armenian

Religion
- Catholicism (29.5%); Islam (30%); Eastern Orthodoxy (7%); Protestantism (2.1%); Other Christian (1.0%); Irreligion (17.3%); other (2.4%) [2021]; Druze (8%)

Related ethnic groups
- Arab Canadians, other Asian Canadians including West Asian Canadians

Lebanese Canadians are Canadians of Lebanese origin. According to the 2016 census there were 219,555 Canadians who claimed Lebanese ancestry, showing an increase compared to the 2006 census, making them by far the largest group of people with Arabic-speaking roots. As of the 2016 census, they are also one of the largest communities of Asian origin in the country.

== History ==
Lebanese immigration began in 1882. The first Lebanese immigrant to Canada was Abraham Bounadere (Ibrahim Abu Nadir) from Zahlé in Lebanon who settled in Montreal. Because of situations within Lebanon and restrictive Canadian laws these immigrants were 90 percent Christian. These immigrants were mostly economic migrants seeking greater prosperity in the New World as well as escaping Ottoman persecution.

In more recent years this pattern has changed, and large numbers of Lebanese Muslims and Druze have come to Canada. Immigration laws were liberalized after the Second World War, and immigration steadily increased in the 1950s and 1960s.

The greatest influx of Lebanese was during the Lebanese Civil War (1975–1990), and this period saw a number of Lebanon's wealthiest and best educated move to Canada to flee the violence in their homeland. Canada and Australia were the only Western countries to set up special programs to enable Lebanese to more easily emigrate. Canada set up an office in Cyprus to process Lebanese refugees.

The media has reported that as many as 50,000 of Lebanese-Canadians were in Lebanon during the summer of 2006, with about half of them permanently residing there. During 2006 Lebanon War the large number of Canadians caught in the crossfire led to a major effort to evacuate them from the war zone. It also led some to accuse some of those holding Canadian citizenship of being Canadians of convenience.

November is Lebanese Heritage Month, and was declared as such by the Parliament of Canada in 2023.

== Demography ==
=== Language ===
Many Lebanese speak French and prefer to settle in francophone Montreal.

=== Religion ===
Lebanese Canadian demography by religion
Religious group	2021 (Note: Religious breakdown proportions based on "Lebanese" ethnic or cultural origin response on the 2021 census.)		2001 (Note: Religious breakdown proportions based on "Lebanese" ethnic or cultural origin response on the 2001 census.)	
Religious group	Pop.	%	Pop.	%
Christianity	104,945	49.83%	90,560	63.05%
Islam	63,255	30.03%	43,435	30.24%
Irreligion	36,465	17.31%	8,590	5.98%
Judaism	785	0.37%	670	0.47%
Buddhism	95	0.05%	75	0.05%
Hinduism	40	0.02%	60	0.04%
Indigenous spirituality	10	0%	—N/a	—N/a
Sikhism	0	0%	25	0.02%
Other	5,010	2.38%	225	0.16%
Total Lebanese Canadian population	210,605	100%	143,640	100%

Lebanese Canadian demography by Christian sects
Religious group	2021		2001	
Religious group	Pop.	%	Pop.	%
Catholic	62,230	59.3%	59,865	66.11%
Orthodox	14,705	14.01%	16,460	18.18%
Protestant	5,385	5.13%	8,795	9.71%
Other Christian	1,210	1.15%	-	0%
Christian (nie)	21,405	20.4%	5,435	6%
Total Lebanese Canadian christian population	104,905	100%	90,560	100%

== Geographical distribution ==
About half of the Lebanese-Canadian community is located in and around Montreal, and most Lebanese-Canadian organizations, especially religious ones, are based in that city.

Lebanese Canadians account for a larger share of the population of Ottawa than that of any other census metropolitan area across the country, constituting over 2 percent of the total population of the National Capital Region. Canadians of Lebanese origin also made up more than 1 percent of the total populations of both Montreal and Halifax, while the figure was close to 1 percent in both Calgary and Edmonton. In Toronto, people of Lebanese origin made up less than half of one per cent of the total population. There are also substantial Lebanese populations in Vancouver, Windsor, London, Edmonton, Fredericton, and Charlottetown.

Halifax is in particular known for its strong Lebanese community, which hosts two different festivals.

== Prominent Canadians of Lebanese descent ==
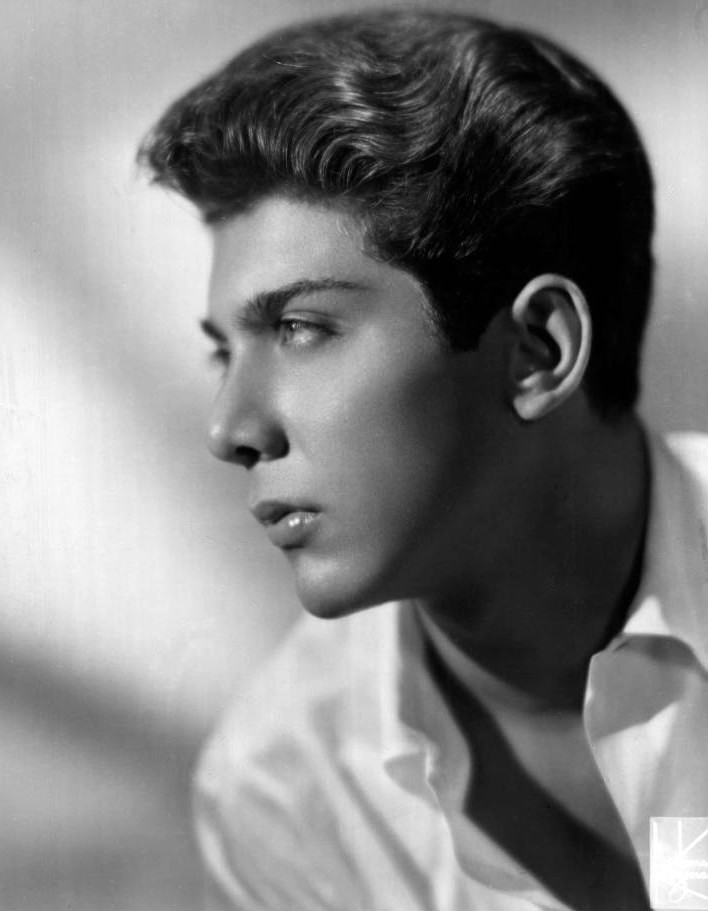
Paul Anka

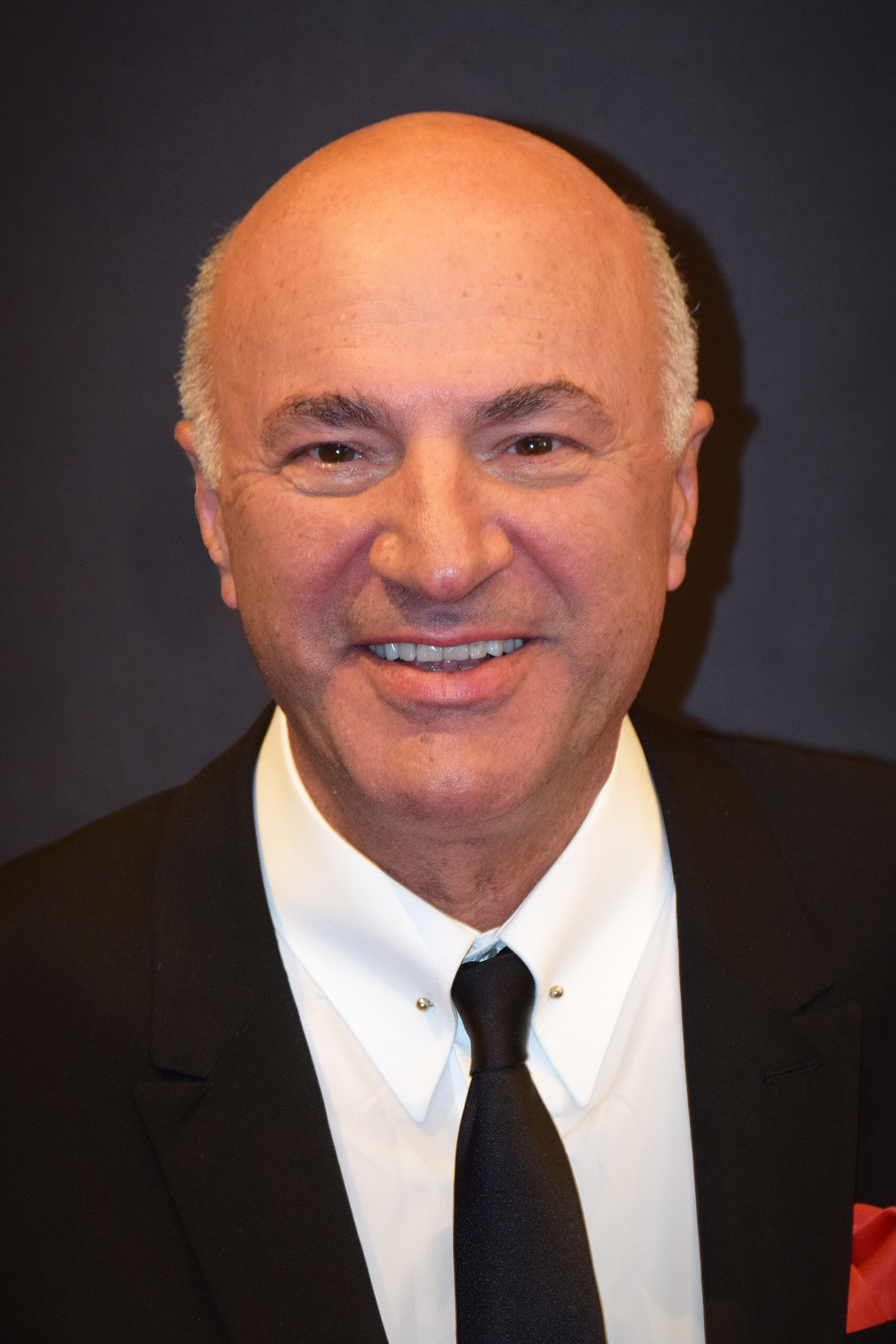
Kevin O'Leary

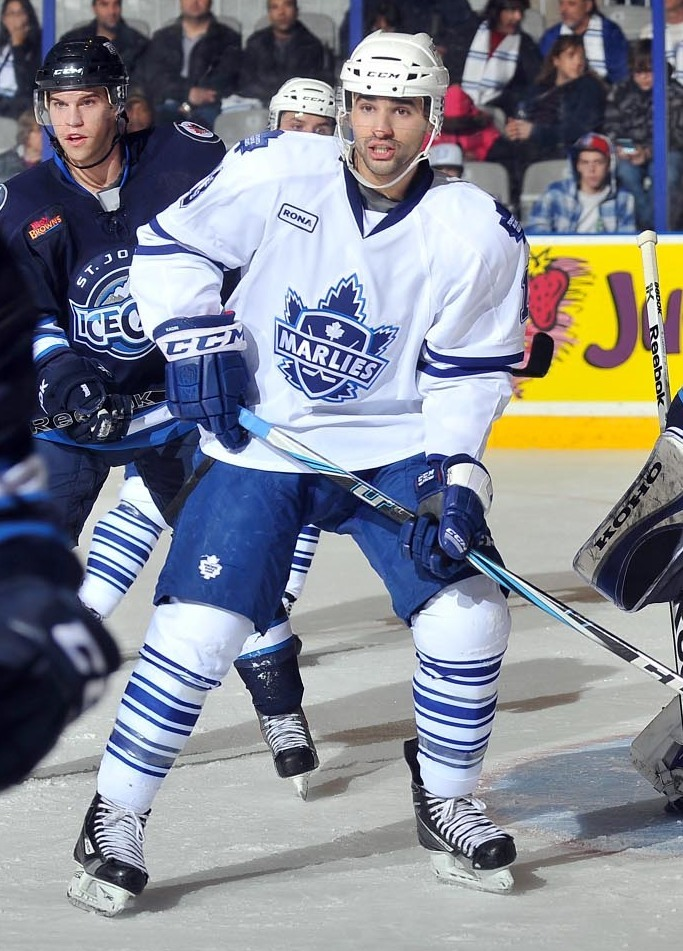
Nazem Kadri

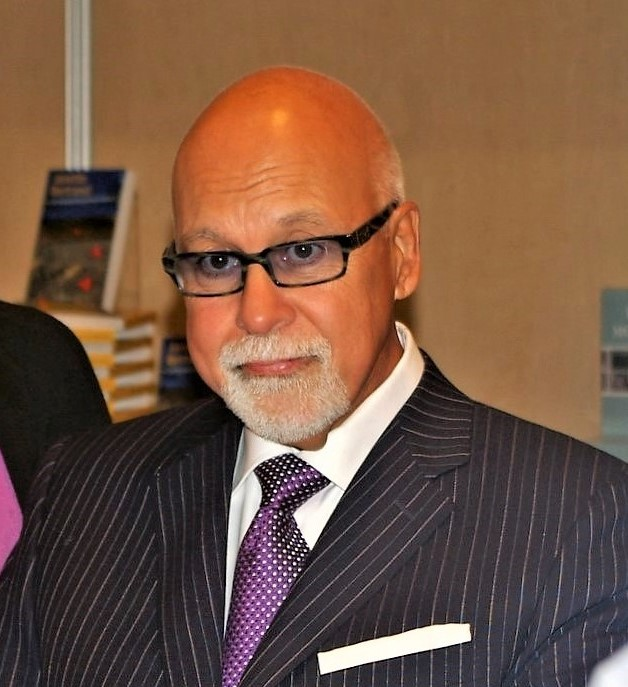
René Angélil

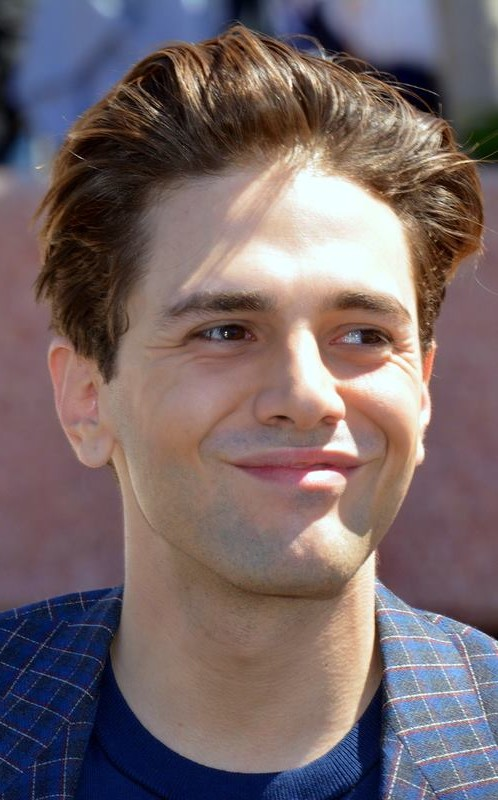
Xavier Dolan

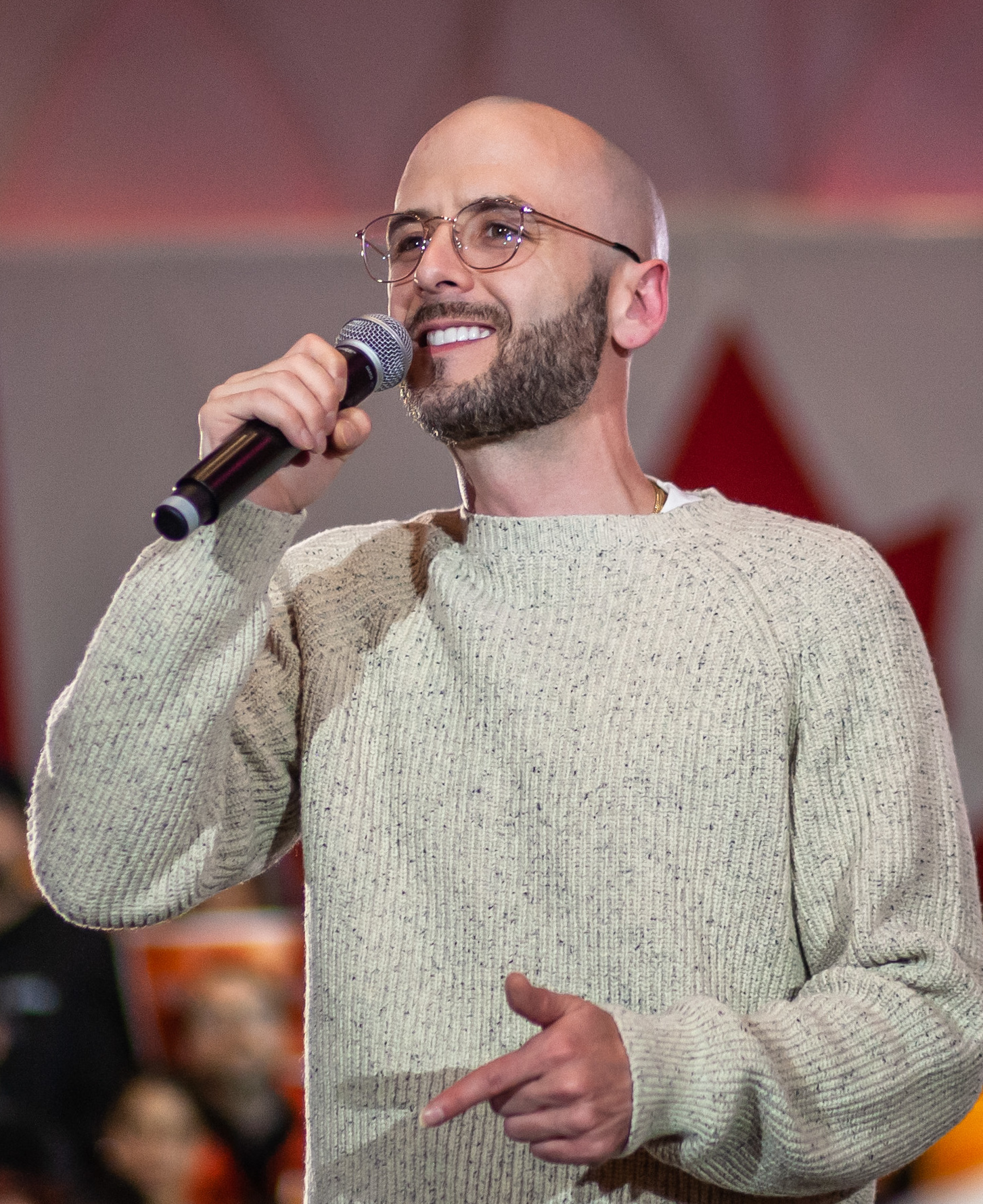
Noah Shebib

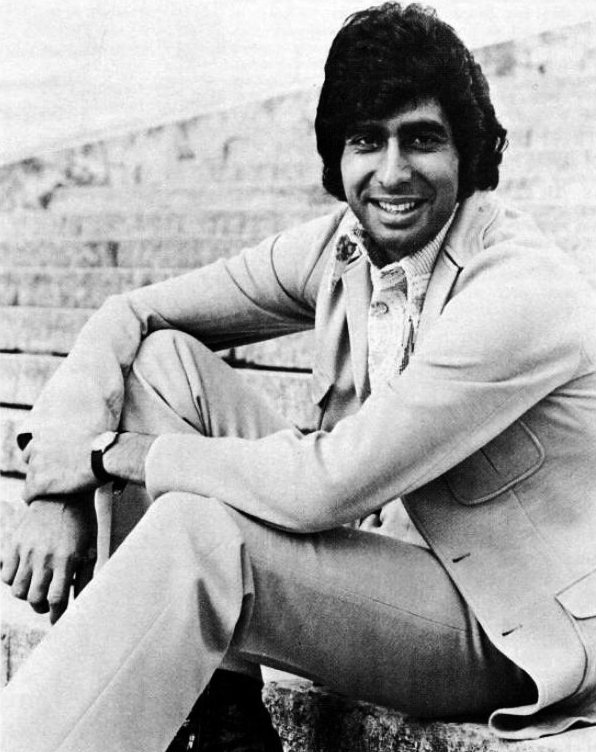
Andy Kim

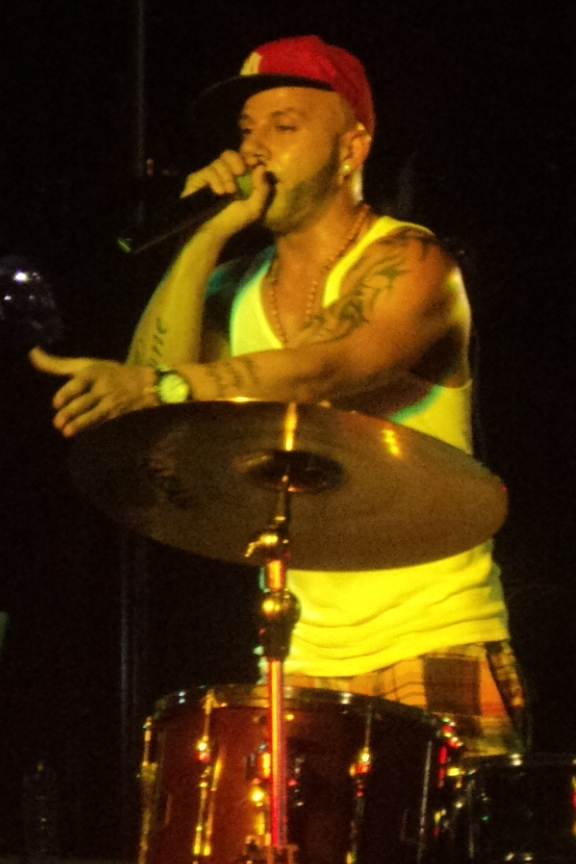
Karl Wolf

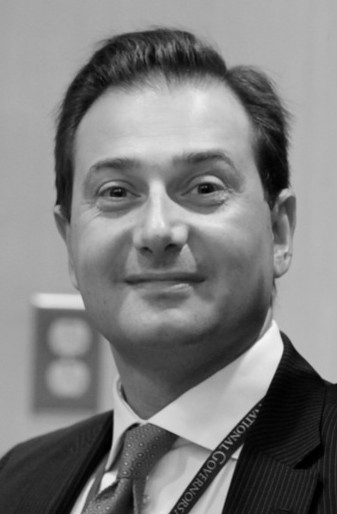
Robert Ghiz

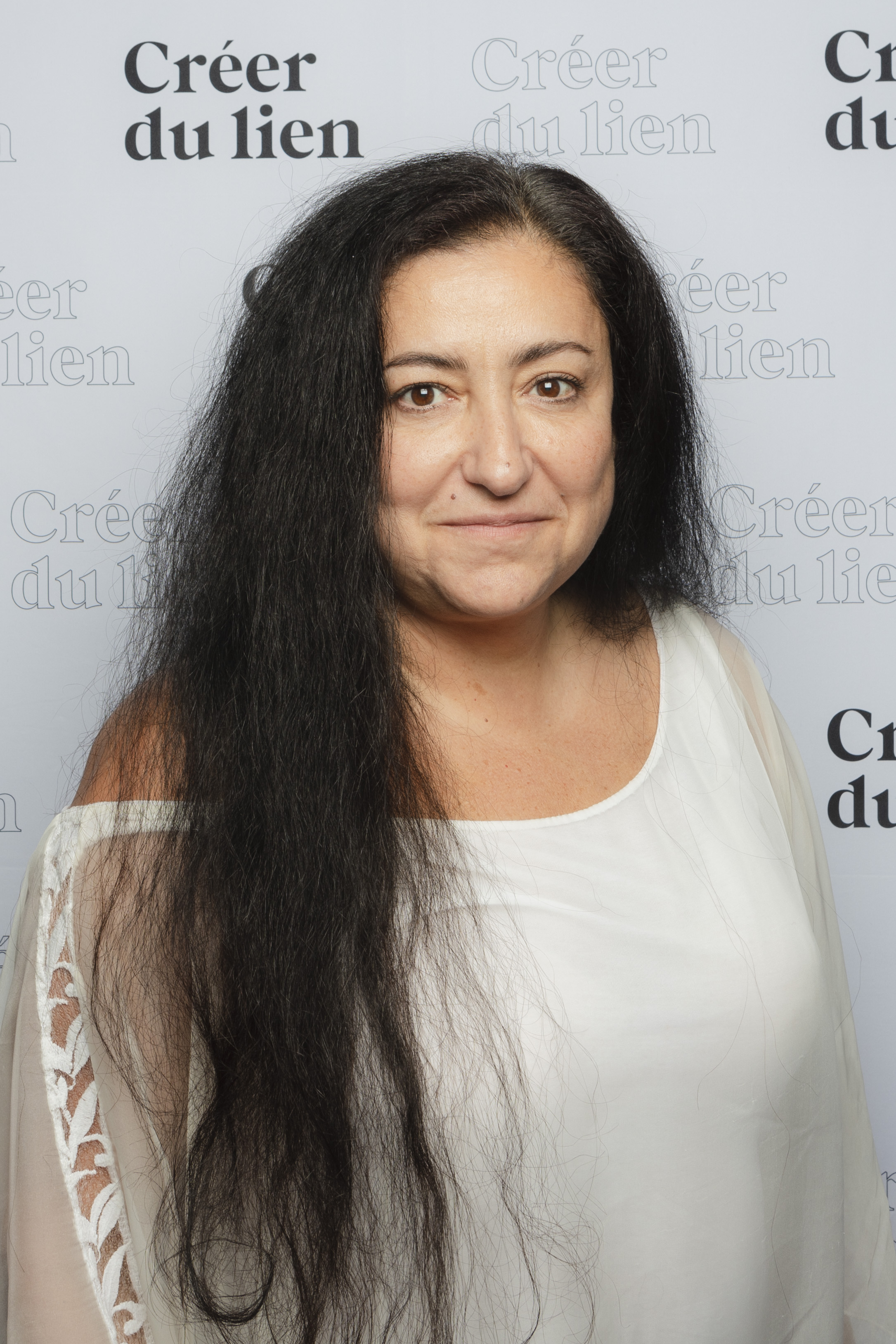
Maria Mourani

== Culture ==
Noted cultural representations of Lebanese Canadian characters include Alain Farah's novel Mille secrets mille dangers, and its 2025 film adaptation Lovely Day.

== See also ==
- Asian Canadians
- West Asian Canadians
- Canada–Lebanon relations
- Lebanese diaspora
