= Lhatu Wangchuk =

Bhutanese politician

Lhatu Wangchuk (born December 15, 1951) was a UN Ambassador from Bhutan, having assumed that office in January 2009. He served in this position until January 2014, being replaced by Kunzang Namgyel.

== Career ==
Wangchuk had served earlier as an ambassador to Bangladesh between 1998 and 2001, and was the tourism director general of Bhutan.

=== United Nations ===
In 2011, Wangchuk authored a UN resolution establishing "Gross National Happiness" as a human development indicator (HDI), alongside traditional measures such as Gross National Income. The motion was eventually backed by 66 co-sponsors and was brought into the UN agenda.
