= United Revolutionary Front of Bhutan =

Maoist guerrilla group in Bhutan

The United Revolutionary Front of Bhutan (URFB) is a Maoist guerrilla group operating in Bhutan founded on April 12, 2007. The URFB's first attacks were meant to cause chaos leading up to the country's first parliamentary elections in March 2009. The group's stated goals are to fight for the rights of ethnic Nepalis exiles and to build a "true democracy" in Bhutan.

== Origin ==
In the 1980s, Bhutan's ethnic Nepalese minority population had boomed and made up around one third of the country's total population. In response, King Jigme Singye Wangchuck launched the Citizenship Act of 1985. This policy stripped thousands of ethnic Nepalese of their Bhutanese citizenship. Some 105,000 ethnic Nepalese were forced from their homes while others were beaten, tortured, and murdered. Many of these exiles ended up in refugee camps along the country's border. The URFB is one of several militant groups which sprang out of these camps.

In 2005, King Jigme Singye Wangchuck abdicated the throne to this son Jigme Khesar Namgyal Wangchuck and announced that the country's first popular elections for a new bicameral legislative body would take place in 2008. However, roughly 12 percent of the population, largely ethnic Nepalese, were excluded from voting. To protest the elections, the URFB formed and began using attacks to send a message to the Bhutanese government.

The URFB's commander-in-chief goes by the alias "Karma." Karma has released statements on behalf of the URFB clearly outlining the group's motives and goals along with claiming responsibility for many attacks around the country.

== Activities ==
=== Confirmed Attacks ===
- March 17, 2008: Members of the URFB planted an improvised explosive device (IED) near a Bhutan Oil Distributor's petrol pump, killing one person.
- December 30, 2008: The group detonated an IED on a tractor carrying six Bhutan forest rangers. Four of the foresters were killed in the incident, and the other two were seriously injured.

Claimed Attacks

- January 20, 2008: The URFB claimed responsibility for a series of bombings in four districts of Bhutan, including the capital Thimphu. No one was killed, but one woman was hit by splinters. The explosion in Thimphu also shattered windows throughout the city's center.
- March 15, 2008: Nine days before the country's first parliamentary election, two bombs destroyed a foundation stub at the base of a tower that transports energy from the Tala Project to India.
- February 17, 2012: Several Royal Bhutan Police officers in Kharbandi were injured in a blast outside a police post. Shortly after, Karma issued a press release taking responsibility for the attack.
