= Visa policy of Bhutan =

Policy on permits required to enter Bhutan

The visa policy of the Kingdom of Bhutan is strictly regulated under the policy of "High Value, Low Volume" tourism, in order to minimize the effect on the country's unique society and environment. Bhutanese policy ensures that only an acceptable number of tourists enter the country at a time, preventing the country from being overwhelmed by mass tourism and consequently changing its character, and that tourists who do arrive get the best experience and value from their visit.

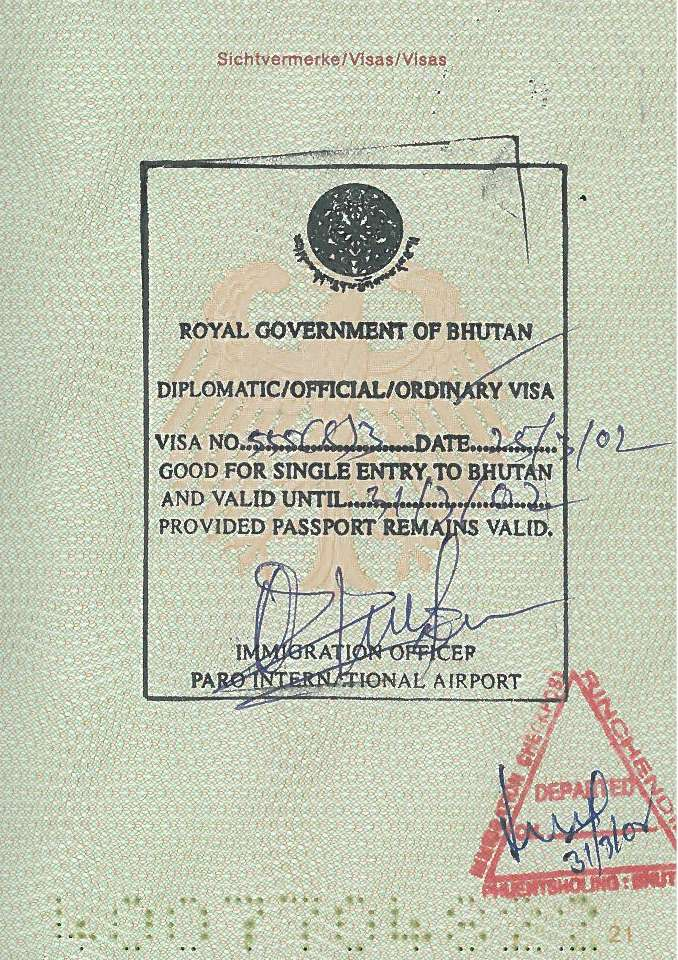
Visa for Bhutan issued in 2002

Visitors to Bhutan must obtain an e-Visa unless they are citizens of one of the visa-exempt countries. All visitors must have a passport valid for at least 6 months.

== Visa policy map ==
Visa policy of Bhutan Bhutan Freedom of movement Visa not required (14 days) eVisa

== Freedom of movement ==
Citizens of India do not need a visa to enter Bhutan, because the 1949 treaty between Bhutan and India allows for free movement of people between the two nations on a reciprocal basis.

From 23 September 2022, this freedom of movement is now restricted to travel within the border towns of Phuentsholing, Gelephu, and Samdrup Jongkhar. Travel beyond these border towns will require a permit, which can be obtained on arrival. Citizens of India may use any of the acceptable documents mentioned below to enter Bhutan:

- Indian passport
- Voter ID card with photo

== Visa exemption ==
=== Ordinary passports ===
Citizens of the following countries may enter Bhutan without a visa for up to 14 days:

- Bangladesh
- Maldives

== Visa on arrival ==
=== Non-ordinary passports ===
Holders of diplomatic or official passports of the following countries may obtain a visa on arrival at the port of entry:

90 days

- Switzerland
- Thailand

== Electronic visa (e-Visa) ==
Citizens of other countries may independently obtain an e-Visa whose duration of stay is 90 days. Visa fee is USD 40 per person (nonrefundable). Visa application may be processed within 5 business days.

e-Visa applicant is also subject to pay the Sustainable Development Fee of USD 100 per night.

== Visa clearance letter ==
All foreigners (except for citizens of Bangladesh, India and Maldives) may obtain a visa in advance through a licensed tour operator and receive a visa approval before travel.

All visas are approved from Thimphu and are only issued to tourists booked with a local licensed tour operator, either directly or through a foreign travel agent. Applications for tourist visas are submitted by the tour operator.

If visa is approved, they are given a visa clearance letter, and must present it at the port of entry. The visa is then stamped into their passport. All foreign citizens may only enter Bhutan through Phuntsholing, Gelephu and Samdrup Jongkhar if coming by land or Paro if coming by air.

== Sustainable Development Fee ==
In August 2023, the Bhutanese government announced that tourists over the age of 5 years must pay a Sustainable Development Fee (SDF) of USD 100 per person per day. Children below the age of 5 years are exempt from paying the SDF. In addition, visitors to Bhutanese towns bordering India are exempt from paying the SDF for up to 24 hours.

Unused SDF can be refunded.

This policy is effective from 1 September 2023 till 31 August 2027 for 4 years.

On 31 October 2026, the Royal Government of Bhutan annouced that the 100 USD SDF policy will be extended til 31 December 2029.

== Visitor statistics ==
Most visitors arriving to Bhutan were from the following countries of nationality:

Country or territory	2019	2018	2017	2016	2015	2014	2013	2012
India	230,381	191,836	172,751	114,301	—N/a	—N/a	—N/a	—N/a
Bangladesh	13,016	10,450	10,536	7,753	—N/a	—N/a	—N/a	—N/a
United States	11,707	10,561	9,220	7,292	7,137	7,291	6,997	6,102
China	7,564	6,878	6,421	9,208	9,399	8,111	4,827	3,816
South Korea	998	6,048	1,035	—N/a	—N/a	—N/a	—N/a	
Singapore	4,744	3,886	4,129	3,015	2,587	1,720	2,051	
United Kingdom	4,241	3,585	3,246	3,124	2,958	2,680	2,309	2,491
Thailand	4,086	3,886	4,047	4,177	3,778	12,105	3,527	3,617
Germany	3,375	3,422	2,970	2,297	2,498	2,971	2,770	2,895
Australia	3,153	2,739	2,249	1,818	1,833	2,037	2,062	1,950
Japan	3,010	2,674	2,744	4,833	2,437	2,707	4,035	7,029
Malaysia	2,761	3,140	2,956	1,967	1,546	2,067	2,054	1,312
Vietnam	2,072	1,961	1,423	—N/a	—N/a	—N/a	—N/a	—N/a
France	1,953	1,773	1,545	1,501	1,563	1,636	1,572	1,863
Philippines	1,912	1,089	1,101	—N/a				
Canada	1,870	1,807	1,524	1,110	—N/a	—N/a	—N/a	—N/a
Spain	1,659	1,397	1,142	—N/a	—N/a	—N/a	—N/a	—N/a
Taiwan	—N/a	1,496	1,491	1,812	—N/a	—N/a	—N/a	—N/a
Switzerland	—N/a	1,379	1,352	—N/a	—N/a	—N/a	—N/a	—N/a
Italy	—N/a	1,229	978	—N/a	—N/a	—N/a	—N/a	—N/a
Indonesia	—N/a	1,033	—N/a	—N/a	—N/a	—N/a	—N/a	—N/a
Netherlands	—N/a	757	—N/a	—N/a	—N/a	—N/a	—N/a	—N/a
Others	20,007		—N/a	—N/a	—N/a	—N/a	—N/a	—N/a
Total	315,599	274,097	237,529	209,570	155,121	133,480	116,209	105,407

== See also ==
- Visa requirements for Bhutanese citizens
