= Atlantic Gateway (Canada) =

Planned transport project in Canada

The Atlantic Gateway is a proposed transport project in Canada. It aims to take an integrated approach in developing transport infrastructure within Atlantic Canada to enhance Canada's ability to capture a larger share of growing trade flows between North America and Asia.

The federal minister responsible for the Atlantic Gateway was Lisa Raitt who took over from Keith Ashfield in July 2013. The position has since been abolished and since 2015 no Minister has been appointed to this portfolio. Peter MacKay had earlier held the portfolio until January 2010.
