= Foreign relations of Bhutan =

Bhutan has diplomatic relations with 64 of the other 192 member states of the United Nations and the European Union. This limited number, and the absence of formal relations with any of the permanent members of the United Nations Security Council, is part of a deliberate isolationist policy of limiting foreign influence in the state. This stance has been safeguarded by close relations with India, of which Bhutan has previously been considered a protected state.

In 1971, sponsored by India, Bhutan began to develop its foreign relations by joining the United Nations. In 1981, Bhutan joined the International Monetary Fund and World Bank, followed by the World Health Organization and UNESCO in 1982. It is also an active member of the South Asian Association for Regional Cooperation (SAARC). Bhutan is currently a member of 45 international organizations.

Under Article 20 of the Constitution of Bhutan enacted in 2008, Bhutan's foreign relations fall under the purview of the monarch, the Druk Gyalpo on the advice of the Executive, which includes the Prime Minister and other Ministers of the Lhengye Zhungtshog including the Minister of Foreign Affairs.

== Diplomatic relations ==
Bhutan has embassies in Bangladesh, Belgium, India, Kuwait, Australia and Thailand. Conversely, only Bangladesh, India, and Kuwait have embassies in Thimphu. The following is a list of countries with which Bhutan maintains diplomatic relations.

#	Country	Date
1	India	14 January 1968
2	Bangladesh	12 April 1973
3	Kuwait	23 May 1983
4	Nepal	3 June 1983
5	Maldives	20 July 1984
6	Netherlands	10 June 1985
7	Denmark	13 August 1985
8	Sweden	27 August 1985
9	Switzerland	16 September 1985
10	Norway	5 November 1985
11	Japan	28 March 1986
12	Finland	1 May 1986
13	Sri Lanka	13 May 1987
14	South Korea	24 September 1987
15	Pakistan	15 December 1988
16	Austria	8 May 1989
17	Thailand	14 November 1989
18	Bahrain	6 January 1992
19	Australia	14 September 2002
20	Singapore	20 September 2002
21	Canada	25 June 2003
22	Belgium	21 January 2009
23	Brazil	21 September 2009
24	Afghanistan	20 April 2010
25	Spain	11 February 2011
26	Cuba	26 September 2011
27	Fiji	18 November 2011
28	Morocco	21 November 2011
29	Luxembourg	1 December 2011
30	Czech Republic	2 December 2011
31	Serbia	9 December 2011
32	Indonesia	15 December 2011
33	Mongolia	18 January 2012
34	Vietnam	19 January 2012
35	Myanmar	1 February 2012
36	Argentina	14 March 2012
37	Costa Rica	21 March 2012
38	Andorra	23 March 2012
39	Mauritius	2 July 2012
40	Eswatini	21 August 2012
41	Slovenia	13 September 2012
42	United Arab Emirates	13 September 2012
43	Slovakia	26 September 2012
44	Turkey	26 September 2012
45	Armenia	26 September 2012
46	Egypt	14 November 2012
47	Kazakhstan	20 November 2012
48	Poland	29 November 2012
49	Colombia	21 December 2012
50	Tajikistan	24 January 2013
51	Azerbaijan	7 February 2013
52	Oman	15 March 2013
53	Germany	25 November 2020
54	Israel	12 December 2020
55	Saudi Arabia	18 September 2024
56	Lesotho	29 October 2024
57	Philippines	6 October 2025
58	Qatar	16 October 2025
59	Liechtenstein	2 June 2026
60	Monaco	8 June 2026
61	Brunei	13 July 2026
62	Jordan	3 August 2026
63	Cambodia	14 October 2026
64	Laos	4 November 2026

== Asia ==
=== Bangladesh ===
Bangladesh is one of only three nations to maintain a residential embassy in Thimphu. Bhutan was the first country in the world to recognize Bangladeshi independence in 1971. The two states have agreed to develop hydropower in the Himalayas, as well as initiate free trade and transshipment through Bangladeshi ports. They also cooperate in water resources management. Both Bhutan and Bangladesh are members of SAARC and BIMSTEC.

=== China ===
Bhutan has no diplomatic relations with its northern neighbor, the People's Republic of China, and is one of the few countries that does not have relations with either of the Two Chinas. The border between Bhutan and the PRC has been closed since the invasion of Tibet in 1950, which caused an influx of refugees. The border also remains undelineated; in 1961 China published a map that altered the traditional border. Tensions have since lessened, especially after an agreement on border peace and tranquility was signed in 1998: the first bilateral agreement between China and Bhutan. Despite the lack of formal diplomatic relations, Bhutan has also maintained an Honorary Consul in Macau since 2000 and in Hong Kong since 2004.

In late 2005, Bhutan claimed that PLA soldiers were building roads and bridges within Bhutanese territory. Bhutanese Foreign Minister Khandu Wangchuk took up the matter with Chinese authorities after the issue was raised in the Bhutanese parliament. In response, Foreign Ministry spokesman Qin Gang of the People's Republic of China has said that the border remains in dispute and that the two sides are continuing to work for a peaceful and cordial resolution of the dispute. The Bhutanese newspaper Kuensel has said that China might use the roads to further Chinese claims along the border.

=== India ===
Historically, ties with India have been close. Both countries signed a first ever Friendship treaty in 1865 between Bhutan and British India. When Bhutan became a monarchy, British India was the first country to recognize it and renewed the treaty in 1910. Bhutan was the first country to recognize Indian independence and renewed the age old treaty with the new government in 1949, including a clause that India would assist Bhutan in foreign relations. On 8 February 2007, the Indo-Bhutan Friendship Treaty was substantially revised under the Bhutanese King, Jigme Khesar Namgyel Wangchuck. In the Treaty of 1949 Article 2 read as "The Government of India undertakes to exercise no interference in the internal administration of Bhutan. On its part the Government of Bhutan agrees to be guided by the advice of the Government of India in regard to its external relations." In the revised treaty this now reads as, "In keeping with the abiding ties of close friendship and cooperation between Bhutan and India, the Government of the Kingdom of Bhutan and the Government of the Republic of India shall cooperate closely with each other on issues relating to their national interests. Neither government shall allow the use of its territory for activities harmful to the national security and interest of the other." The revised treaty also includes in it the preamble "Reaffirming their respect for each other's independence, sovereignty and territorial integrity", an element that was absent in the earlier version. The Indo-Bhutan Friendship Treaty of 2007 strengthens Bhutan's status as an independent and sovereign nation.

There also exists bi-lateral agreement between Bhutanese and Indian Government wherein citizens of both nations can travel freely in other country without passport or visa.

=== Indonesia ===
Diplomatic relations between Indonesia and Bhutan were officially established on 15 December 2011. The joint communiqué was signed by Bhutan's Ambassador and Permanent Representative to the United Nations (UN), Lhatu Wangchuk, and Indonesia's Ambassador and Permanent Representative to the UN, Hasan Kleib, in New York. Diplomatic affairs between Indonesia and Bhutan are handled by the Embassy of the Republic of Indonesia (KBRI) in New Delhi, India.

=== Israel ===
Bhutan and Israel established formal diplomatic relations in 2020, with the key areas of cooperation being economic, technological and agricultural development.

=== Myanmar ===
Both countries are a member of BIMSTEC and SASEC. Diplomatic relations were formally established on 1 February 2012.

=== Nepal ===
Nepal and Bhutan established relations in 1983. However, since 1992, relations with Nepal have been tense due to the repatriation of refugees from Bhutan.

=== Philippines ===
The Philippines and Bhutan formally established diplomatic relations on 6 October 2025. The Philippines has an embassy in New Delhi, India as representative to dialogues with Bhutan. Numerous senators and high-profile personalities from the Philippines have visited Bhutan and have been pushing for the Gross National Happiness to also be applied in the Philippines, citing its effectiveness and efficiency in nation-building, environmental and cultural conservation, and human rights upholding. Filipina senator Loren Legarda, a United Nations Global Champion for Resilience, has been pushing for greater diplomatic relations between the two countries. In September 2014, the Prime Minister of Bhutan visited the Philippines and the Asian Development Bank headquarters in Manila. In 2018, the Philippines sent its engineers to Bhutan's capital in a bid to develop Bhutan's space program that will be launched in May.

=== South Korea ===
Bhutan and South Korea established formal relations on 24 September 1987. South Korea granted Bhutan a total of US$6.21 million in aid between 1987 and 2012. Imports into South Korea are about $382,000 and imports into Bhutan are about $3.27 million (as of 2012).

== Other countries ==
=== Turkey ===
Both countries established diplomatic relations in 2012. Bhutan and Turkey cooperate through their respective embassies in New Delhi. Trade volume between the two countries was US$1.58 million in 2018 (Bhutanese exports/imports: 1.48/0.1 million USD).

=== United States ===
The United States and Bhutan have no official diplomatic ties; however, they both maintain "warm, informal relations" with each other, as well as consular relations.

Bhutan is represented by its permanent mission in the United Nations, while the American embassy in New Delhi is currently accredited for Bhutan.

== Transnational issues ==
Bhutan has relations with other nations based on transnational issues. Among these issues are extradition, terrorism, and refugees. To a limited extent, Bhutanese law provides frameworks for cooperation with countries which Bhutan has no formal mission.

=== Extradition ===
Bhutan has a legislated policy on extradition of criminals, both to and from the kingdom. Any nation, with or without formal relations, may request the extradition of fugitives who abscond to Bhutan. The Extradition Act requires nations to provide "all relevant evidence and information" about the accused, after which the Royal Government may in its discretion refer the matter to the High Court of Bhutan. The Court may then issue a summons or warrant, conduct an inquiry, and collect evidence, holding the accused for a maximum of 30 days. Alternatively, the Royal Government may refer the matter to the courts for trial within Bhutan. Bhutan imposes punishments for offenses committed in treaty states generally, and for offenses in other states resulting in return to Bhutan. Offenses are weighed according to gravity, determined by a schedule and two-part test: extraditable offenses are those enumerated (including murder, theft, forgery, and smuggling), or which in Bhutan would be punished by a prison term exceeding twelve months. All felonies in Bhutan are punishable by a minimum of three years' imprisonment.

Bhutan will refuse requests for extradition if the Royal Government or its courts determine the person is accused of a political offense.

=== International cooperation against terrorism ===
Bhutan cooperates with India to expel Nagaland separatists; lacking any treaty describing the boundary, Bhutan and China continue negotiations to establish a common boundary alignment to resolve territorial disputes arising from substantial cartographic discrepancies, the largest of which lie in Bhutan's northwest and along the Chumbi salient.

=== Refugee resettlement ===
The U.S. has offered to resettle 60,000 of the 107,000 Bhutanese refugees of Nepalese origin now living in seven U.N. refugee camps in southeastern Nepal. Six other nations—Australia, Canada, Norway, Netherlands, New Zealand and Denmark—have offered to resettle 10,000 each.

Other countries also operate resettlement programs in the camps. Norway has already settled 200 Bhutanese refugees, and Canada has agreed to accept up to 5,000 through to 2012.

== See also ==
- Bhutan House
- List of diplomatic missions in Bhutan
