= Many Petals of the Lotus =

1999 book by Janet McLellan

Many Petals of the Lotus: Five Asian Buddhist Communities in Toronto
- Author: Janet McLellan
- Language: English
- Genre: Non-fiction
- Publisher: University of Toronto Press
- Publication date: 1999
- Publication place: Canada

Many Petals of the Lotus: Five Asian Buddhist Communities in Toronto is a non-fiction book by Janet McLellan, published by the University of Toronto Press in 1999.

The book discusses Asian Canadian Buddhist ethnic groups in Toronto. Specific ethnic groups covered include those of Cambodian, (Han) Chinese, Japanese, Tibetan, and (Kinh) Vietnamese ancestries.

== Background ==
The author worked for the University of Toronto in the university's religion department as a lecturer.

Part of her research involved observing people who were participants in her studies. These events included congregations of people that formed both for casual social reasons and for official reasons. She administered a survey to Buddhist organizations of Chinese ancestry. She also consulted ethnic Chinese newspapers in Toronto, statistical documents related to immigration, and content from archives of Buddhist organizations.

== Contents ==
The first chapter summarizes the historical developments of Buddhism of Asian Canadian communities in Canada and Toronto. The book also describes the Buddhist communities back in Asia where the immigrants came from.

The five subsequent chapters each focus on a particular ethnic group.

== Reception ==
Carl L. Bankston III of Tulane University stated that the work is "extremely useful" for academics, and that he "would rank" the book "as one of the essential studies of contemporary Asian American Buddhism" together with Old Wisdom in the New World. He stated that the chapter about Buddhists of Cambodian ancestry was the "strongest" in the book. Bankston argued that he thought the book should have had more comparative analysis, and that the "theory and immediacy" of the ethnography was crowded out by "so much historical and organizational detail".

Marilyn Nefsky of the University of Lethbridge wrote that the author was a "competent ethnographer" and that the writing style was "captivating".

Pranee Liamputtong Rice of La Trobe University described the book as "interesting and extremely informative".

Reviewer Anna Woodrow stated that the book is "both informative and a useful application across disciplines".
