= Little Punjab =

Little Punjab may refer to:

- Punjab Avenue, an area of New York City
- Punjabi Market, Vancouver, Canada
- Little Punjab, in Paldi, British Columbia, Canada

== See also ==
- Punjab
- Punjabi diaspora
