= Asian Canadians =

Ethnic group in Canada

- Asian ancestry % in Canada (2021)

Total population
- 7,331,610 (Note: 2021 census: Total responses of all Asian geographical origin population groups classified under "Ethnic or cultural origin" and "Visible minority" sections including: "South Asian" (2,571,400 persons); "Asian, n.o.s." (226,220 persons); "West and Central Asian and Middle Eastern" (1,086,230 persons); "East and Southeast Asian" (3,447,030 persons); "Asian origins, n.i.e." (730 persons).); 20.2% of the Canadian population (2021)

Regions with significant populations
- Western Canada · Central Canada · Urban less prevalent in the Atlantic and North

Languages
- Canadian English · Canadian French; Mandarin · Cantonese · Hindustani · Punjabi · Arabic · Tagalog; Other Asian languages

Religion
- Christianity · Buddhism and other East Asian religions · Islam · Hinduism · Sikhism · Judaism · Non-religious · Other

Related ethnic groups
- Asian Americans · Asian Australians · Asian Britons · Asian Dutch · Asian New Zealanders · Asian people

Asian Canadians are Canadians who were either born in or can trace their ancestry from Asia. Canadians with Asian ancestry comprise both the largest and fastest-growing group in Canada, after European Canadians, forming approximately 20.2 percent of the Canadian population as of 2021, making up the majority of Canada's visible minority population. Most Asian Canadians are concentrated in the urban areas of Southern Ontario, Southwestern British Columbia, Central Alberta, and other large Canadian cities.

Asian Canadians are considered visible minorities and may be classified as East Asian Canadians, South Asian Canadians, Southeast Asian Canadians, and West Asian Canadians.

According to the 2021 Canadian census, the pan-ethnic breakdown of major Asian-origin Canadian groups includes South Asian Canadians (2,571,400 persons or 35.1%), East Asian Canadians (2,288,775 persons or 31.2%), (Note: Chinese: 1,715,770 persons Korean: 218,140 persons Japanese: 129,425 persons Hong Konger: 81,680 persons Taiwanese: 64,020 persons Tibetan: 9,350 persons Mongolian: 9,090 persons Other East Asian: 61,300 persons) Southeast Asian Canadians (1,435,360 persons or 19.6%), (Note: Filipino: 957,355 persons Bruneian: 1,040 persons Burmese: 9,150 persons Cambodian: 41,950 persons Chin: 1,745 persons Hmong: 1,030 persons Igorot: 7,535 persons Ilocano: 25,575 persons Indonesian: 26,330 persons Javanese: 1,015 persons Karen: 6,050 persons Laotian: 25,875 persons Malay: 9,795 persons Malaysian: 17,050 persons Singaporean: 6,060 persons Thai: 22,275 persons Vietnamese: 275,530 persons) and West Asian Canadians (1,086,230 people or 14.8%). In further detail, the largest self-reported Asian origin groups in Canada are Chinese Canadians, Indian Canadians, Filipino Canadians, Pakistani Canadians, Vietnamese Canadians, and Lebanese Canadians.

== Terminology ==
In the Canadian census, people with origins or ancestry in East Asia (e.g. Chinese Canadians, Korean Canadians, Japanese Canadians, Tibetan Canadians), South Asia (e.g. Bangladeshi Canadians, Indian Canadians, Pakistani Canadians, Sri Lankan Canadians), Southeast Asia (e.g. Laotian Canadians, Cambodian Canadians, Filipino Canadians, Vietnamese Canadians), West Asia (e.g. Iranian Canadians, Kurdish Canadians, Israeli Canadians, Lebanese Canadians, Turkish Canadians), or Central Asia (e.g. Afghan Canadians, Uzbek Canadians, Kazakh Canadians) are all classified as part of the Asian race.

== History ==
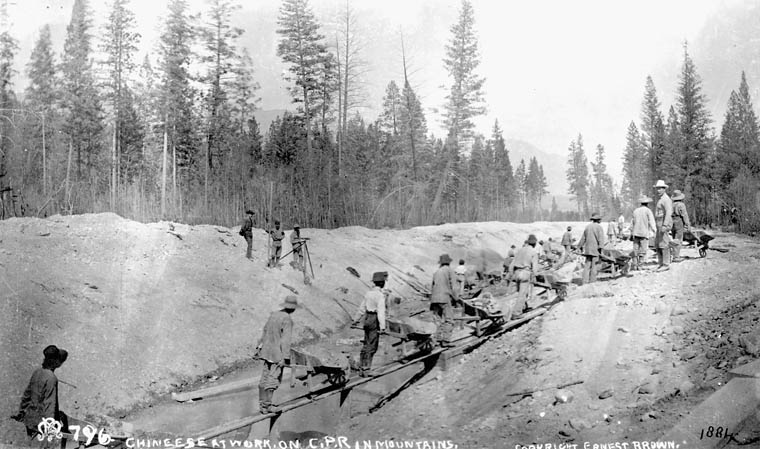
Chinese labourers working on the Canadian Pacific Railway, 1884

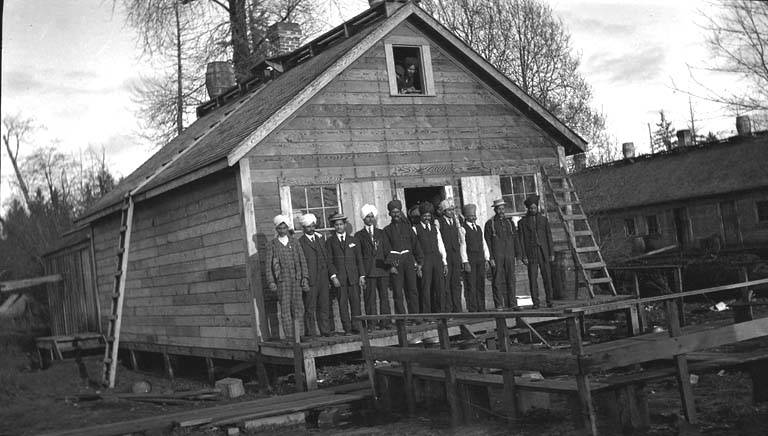
South Asians at a lumber camp in British Columbia, circa 1914

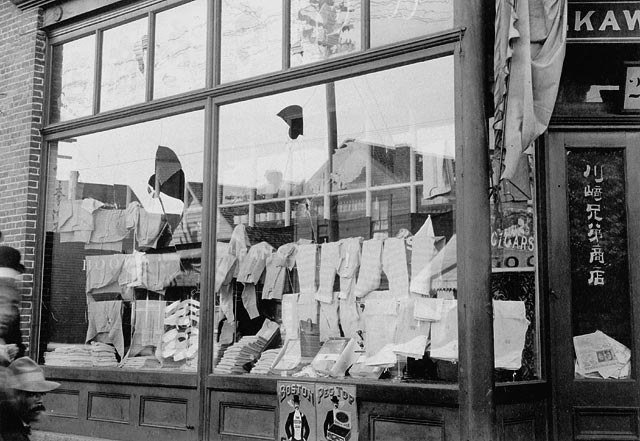
Damage after the September 1907 anti-Asian riot in Vancouver

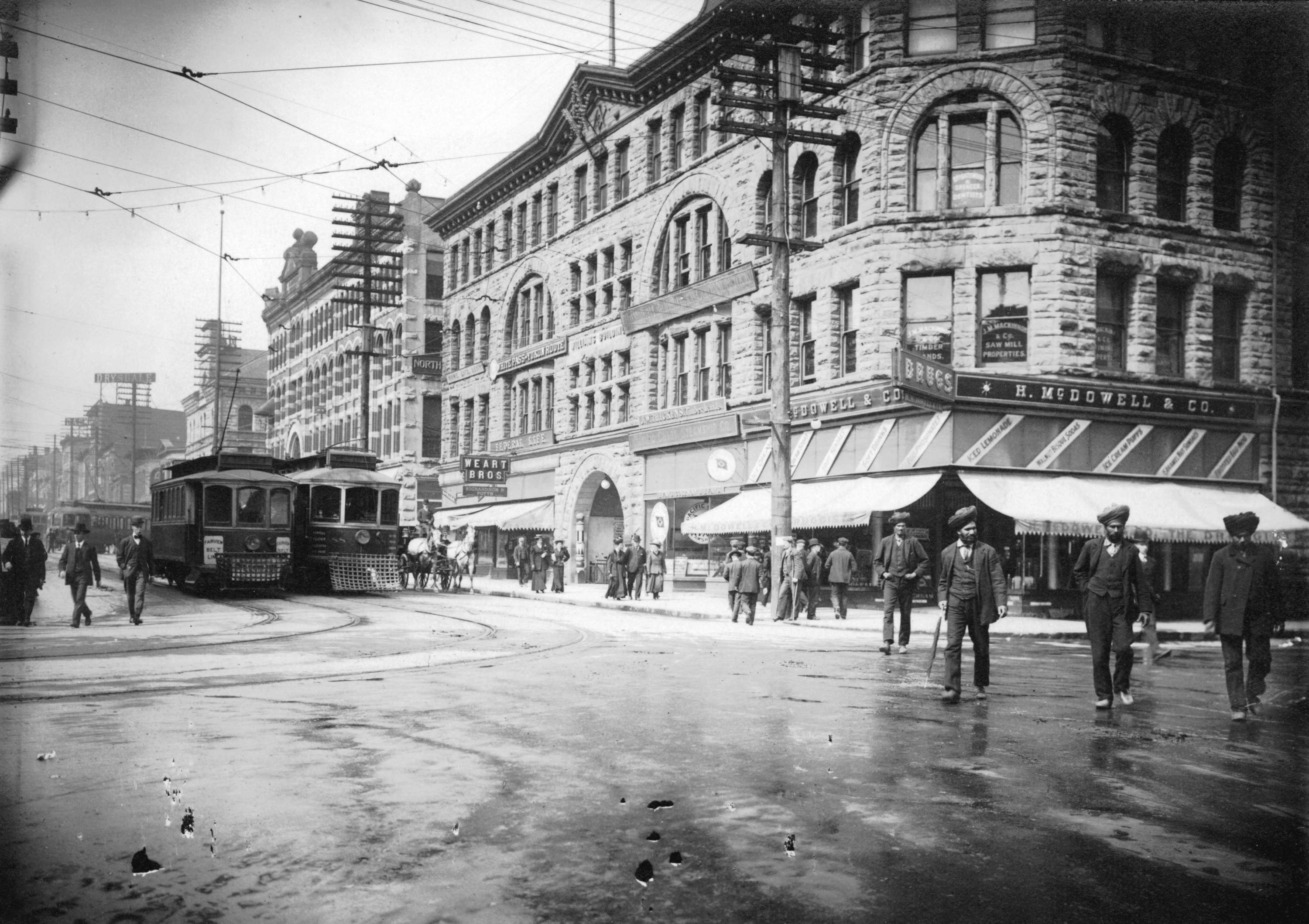
Indians in Vancouver, 1908

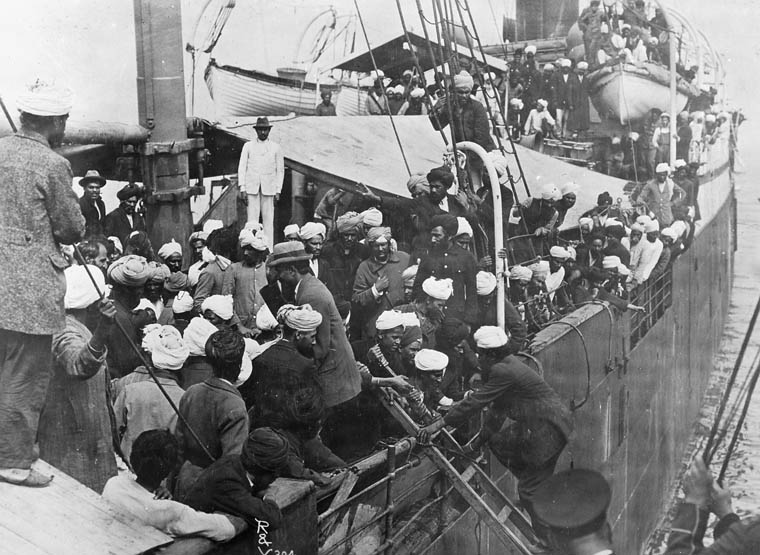
South Asians aboard Komagata Maru in Vancouver, 1914

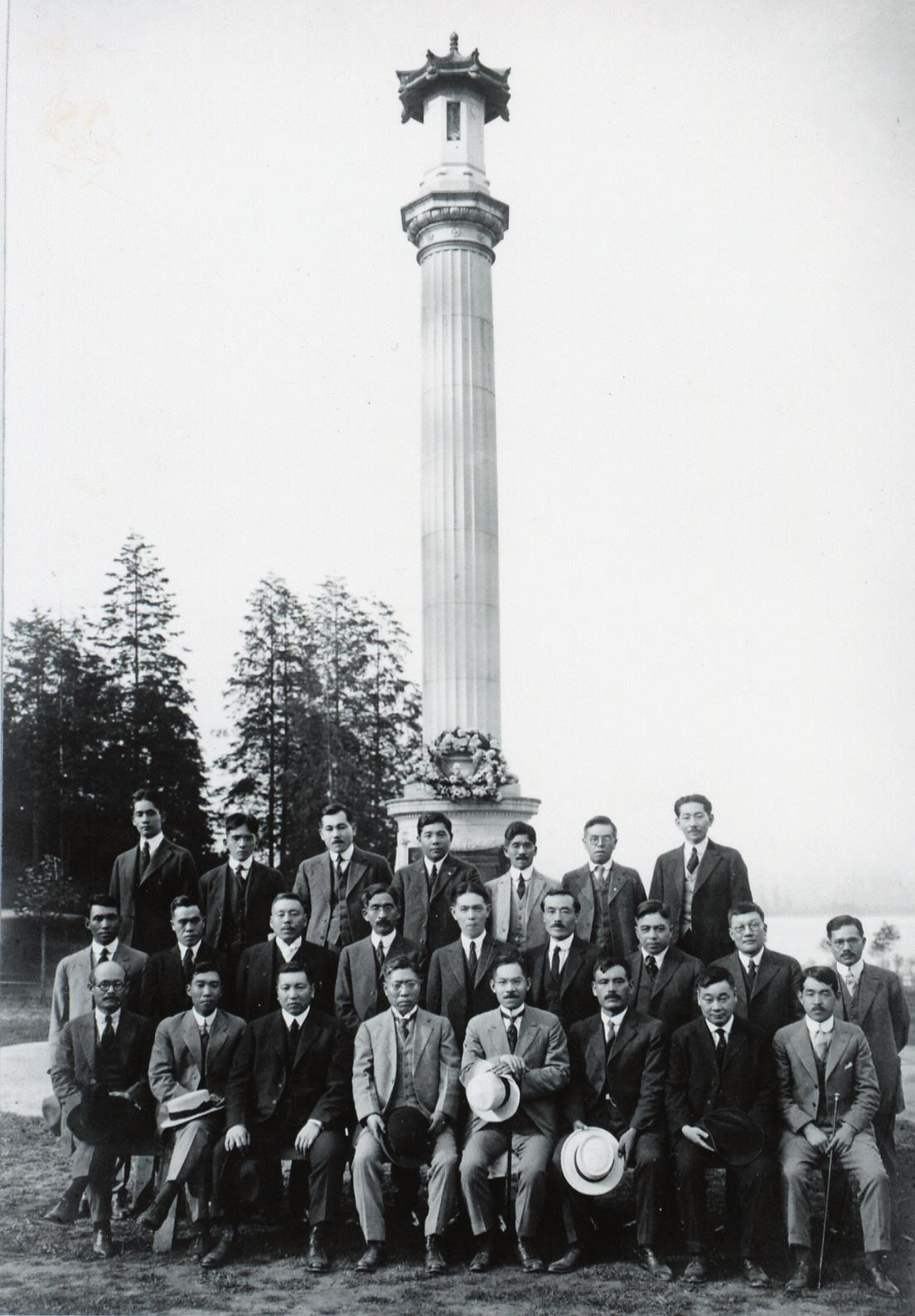
Founding members of the Canadian Japanese Association at the Japanese Canadian War Memorial in Vancouver, 1920.

=== 18th century ===
The first record of Asians in what is known as Canada today can be dated back to the late 18th century. In 1788, renegade British Captain John Meares hired a group of Chinese carpenters from Macau and employed them to build a ship at Nootka Sound, Vancouver Island, British Columbia. After the outpost was seized by Spanish forces, the eventual whereabouts of the carpenters was largely unknown.

By late 1700s, Filipinos, then-known as "Manila men" were recruited in naval operations, aboard the ship San Carlos el Filipino sent to support the short-lived Spanish settlement of Santa Cruz de Nuca and Fort San Miguel, Nootka Island, off the coast of Vancouver.

=== 19th century ===
During the mid 19th century, many Chinese people arrived to take part in the British Columbia gold rushes. Beginning in 1858, early settlers formed Victoria's Chinatown and other Chinese communities in New Westminster, Yale, and Lillooet. Estimates indicate that about 1/3 of the non-native population of the Fraser goldfields was Chinese. Later, the construction of the Canadian Pacific Railway prompted another wave of immigration from the East Asian country. Mainly hailing from Guangdong Province, the Chinese helped build the Canadian Pacific Railway through the Fraser Canyon.

Many Japanese people also arrived in Canada during the mid to late 19th century and became fishermen and merchants in British Columbia. Early immigrants from the East Asian island nation most notably worked in canneries such as Steveston along the pacific coast.

Similarly in the late 19th century, many Indians hailing from Punjab Province settled in British Columbia and worked in the forestry industry. Most early immigrants hailing from South Asia first settled around sawmill towns along the Fraser River in southwestern British Columbia such as Kitsilano, Fraser Mills, and Queensborough. Later, many Indian immigrants also settled on Vancouver Island, working on local sawmills in Victoria, Coombs, Duncan, Ocean Falls, and Paldi.

Early West Asian Canadian history featured Lebanese and Syrians first immigrating in Canada during the late 19th century; as both countries were under Ottoman dominion at the time they were originally known as Turks or Syrian−Lebanese on census reports. Settling in the Montreal area of southern Quebec, they became the first West Asian group to immigrate to Canada. The first Lebanese immigrant to Canada was Abraham Bounadere (Ibrahim Abu Nadir) from Zahlé in Lebanon who settled in Montreal in 1882. Because of situations within Lebanon and restrictive Canadian laws these immigrants were 90% Christian. These immigrants were mostly economic migrants seeking greater prosperity in the New World.

Similar to late 19th century through early 20th century Lebanese immigration and settler patterns, while the vast majority of Syrians migrated to South America, a small percentage made their way to the United States, and an even smaller percentage settled in Canada. Once again, in a similar demographic to early Lebanese settlers to Canada, the overwhelming majority of Syrians who settled in Canada from the 1880s–1960s were of the Christian faith. The so-called shepherd of the lost flock, Saint Raphael Hawaweeny of Brooklyn, New York, came to Montreal in 1896 to help establish a Christian association called the Syrian Benevolent Society and then later on an Orthodox church in Montreal for the newly arrived Syrian faithful.

West Asian settlement into Canada was also bolstered by early Armenian immigration during the late 19th century. The first Armenians migrated to Canada in the 1880s. The first recorded Armenian to settle in Canada was a man named Garabed Nergarian, who came to Port Hope, Ontario in 1887. Some 37 Armenians settled in Canada in 1892 and 100 in 1895. Most early Armenian migrants to Canada were men who were seeking employment. After the Hamidian massacres of mid-1890s Armenian families from the Ottoman Empire began settling in Canada.

Additionally, Canada's earliest documented Filipinos coincided with North America's first wave of Asian immigration in the 1800s. At least nine male Filipino sailors, aged twenty-four to forty-two, appeared on the 1881 Census of British Columbia. Living on a vessel in New Westminster, they were recorded ethno-racially as "Malay" [a loose term to describe Austronesian people] and listed as "Mahomitan" [an archaic term for Muslim]. In the ensuing decades, several Filipino settlers resided along the B.C. coast, particularly on Bowen Island, in the 1880s.

Early Filipino settlers along the B.C. coast engaged in both fishing and farming. It included Fernando Toreenya, a fisherman who came to Canada from the Philippines in 1886 at the age of 20 years old with his First Nations partner Mary/Marie Adams. They lived in Snug Cove and had three other Filipino boarders living with them, William Matilda, Antoni Bentorre and Ricardo Castro. Others included Ben Flores, who were "beachcombers and fishermen" and were settled on a barge in Snug Cove; Basinto Pasento, who called his home Pasento Ranch and died in February 1904, John Delmond, and Jose Garcia. Several others worked as loggers, millhand, mine laborers, and longshoremen intermarrying with Indigenous peoples and other Pacific Islanders.

By 1884, Nanaimo, New Westminster, Yale, and Victoria had the largest Chinese populations in the province. Other settlements such as Quesnelle Forks were majority Chinese and many early immigrants from the East Asian country settled on Vancouver Island, most notably in Cumberland. In addition to work on the railway, most Chinese in the late 19th century British Columbia lived among other Chinese and worked in market gardens, coal mines, sawmills, and salmon canneries.

In 1885, soon after the construction on the railway was completed, the federal government passed the Chinese Immigration Act, whereby the government began to charge a substantial head tax for each Chinese person trying to immigrate to Canada. A decade later, the fear of the "Yellow Peril" prompted the government of Mackenzie Bowell to pass an act forbidding any East Asian Canadian from voting or holding office.

Many Chinese workers settled in Canada after the railway was constructed, however most could not bring the rest of their families, including immediate relatives, due to government restrictions and enormous processing fees. They established Chinatowns and societies in undesirable sections of the cities, such as East Pender Street in Vancouver, which had been the focus of the early city's red-light district until Chinese merchants took over the area from the 1890s onwards.

=== 20th century ===
Immigration restrictions stemming from anti-Asian sentiment in Canada continued during the early 20th century. Parliament voted to increase the Chinese head tax to $500 in 1902; this temporarily caused Chinese immigration to Canada to stop. However, in following years, Chinese immigration to Canada recommenced as many saved up money to pay the head tax. Due to the decrease in Chinese immigration, Steamship lines began recruiting Indians to make up for the loss of business; the Fraser River Canners' Association and the Kootchang Fruit Growers' Association asked the Canadian government to abolish immigration restrictions. Letters from persons settling in Canada gave persons still in India encouragement to move to Canada, and there was an advertising campaign to promote British Columbia as an immigration destination. Around that time, in 1902, a notable moment of Asian Canadian history occurred when Punjabi Sikh settlers first arrived in Golden, British Columbia to work at the Columbia River Lumber Company.

In 1901, Canada had between 300 and 400 Muslim residents, equally divided between Turks and Syrian Arabs. Furthermore, the turn of the 20th century featured a small wave of Syrian−Lebanese settlement into the southern prairies including Alberta, Saskatchewan, and Manitoba. Contemporarily in Lebanon, many families were from what was western Syria at the time in particular settled in southern Saskatchewan. A majority of the Syrian−Lebanese families settling in the prairies were of the Christian faith, with a minority adhering to Islam, mirroring earlier settler demographics in Nova Scotia, Quebec and Ontario. Prominent settlement occurred in communities such as Swift Current, Saskatchewan, and Lac La Biche, Alberta. Few reached the Northwest Territories, the best known being Peter Baker, author of the book An Arctic Arab, and later elected as a member of the legislative assembly of the Northwest Territories.

The early Punjabi Sikh settlers in Golden built the first Gurdwara (Sikh Temple) in Canada and North America in 1905, which would later be destroyed by fire in 1926. The second Gurdwara to be built in Canada was in 1908 in Kitsilano (Vancouver), aimed at serving a growing number of Punjabi Sikh settlers who worked at nearby sawmills along False Creek at the time. The Gurdwara would later close and be demolished in 1970, with the temple society relocating to the newly built Gurdwara on Ross Street, in South Vancouver. As a result, the oldest existing Gurdwara in Canada today is the Gur Sikh Temple, located in Abbotsford, British Columbia. Built in 1911, the temple was designated as a national historic site of Canada in 2002 and is the third-oldest Gurdwara in the country. Soon later, the fourth Gurdwara to be built Canada was established at the Fraser Mills (Coquitlam) settlement in 1913 followed by the fifth at the Queensborough (New Westminster) settlement in 1919, and the sixth at the Paldi (Vancouver Island) settlement, also in 1919.

Heightened anti-Asian sentiment resulted in the infamous anti-Asian pogrom in Vancouver in 1907. Spurred by similar riots in Bellingham targeting Punjabi Sikh South Asian settlers, The Asiatic Exclusion League organized attacks against homes and businesses owned by East Asian immigrants under the slogan "White Canada Forever!"; though no one was killed, much property damage was done and numerous East Asian Canadians were beaten up.

In 1908, the British Columbia government passed a law preventing South Asian Canadians from voting. Because eligibility for federal elections originated from provincial voting lists, Indians were also unable to vote in federal elections. Later, the Canadian government enacted a $200 head tax and passed the continuous journey regulation which indirectly halted Indian immigration to Canada, thus restricting all immigration from South Asia.

A direct result of the continuous journey regulation was the Komagata Maru incident in Vancouver. In May 1914, hundreds of South Asians hailing from Punjab were denied entry into the country, eventually forced to depart for India. By 1916, despite a declining population due to immigration restrictions, many Indian settlers established the Paldi mill colony on Vancouver Island.

During the pre-World War I period, Turks were to be found in mining and logging camps across Canada. However, due to bad relations between the Ottoman Empire and Allied Powers of WWI, further migration was made difficult for the Turks and the Canadian government discouraged "Asian" immigration. With the Canadian Immigration Act of 1910, Turkish immigration to Canada was banned. With the onset of the first world war, Turkish Canadians were placed in "enemy alien" internment camps. Five days after the first world war began, on November 10, 1914, 98 Turks were deported and settled in Kingston and then in Kapuskasing. Their number increased over time. They were not the only "enemy aliens" subjected to internment. More than 8,500 people were placed in 24 camps during the war. Of them 205 were Turks.

Before the Armenian genocide of 1915 some 1,800 Armenians already lived in Canada. They were overwhelmingly from the Armenian provinces of the Ottoman Empire and usually lived in industrial urban areas. The influx of Armenians to Canada was limited in the post-World War I era because Armenians were classified as Asians. Nevertheless, some 1,500 genocide survivors—mostly women and children—came to Canada as refugees. In 1923–24 some 100 Armenians orphans aged 8–12, later known as The Georgetown Boys, were brought to Canada from Corfu, Greece by the Armenian Canadian Relief Fund to Georgetown, Ontario. Dubbed "The Noble Experiment", it was Canada's first humanitarian act on an international scale. The Georgetown Farmhouse (now the Cedarvale Community Centre) was designated historic and protected municipal site in 2010. Overall, between 1900 and 1930 some 3,100 Armenians entered Canada, with 75% settling in Ontario and 20% in Quebec. Some later moved to the United States; 1,577 Armenians entered the U.S. from Canada between 1899 and 1917.

In 1923, the federal government passed the Chinese Immigration Act of 1923, which banned all Chinese immigration, and led to immigration restrictions for all East Asians. In 1947, the act was repealed.

The second world war prompted the federal government used the War Measures Act to brand Japanese Canadians enemy aliens and categorized them as security threats in 1942. Tens of thousands of Japanese Canadians were placed in internment camps in British Columbia; prison of war camps in Ontario; and families were also sent as forced labourers to farms throughout the prairies. By 1943, all properties owned by Japanese Canadians in British Columbia were seized and sold without consent.

In 1950, 10 Filipinos were recorded in Manitoba. The first-generation Filipino-Canadians were mainly women who worked as nurses and teachers and in the health sector. These first Filipinos came from the United States to renew their visas after they had expired in the hope of returning to the US. Most of them returned, but some stayed in Canada. From 1946 to 1964, the total number of Filipinos in Canada was 770. In the 1960s, Canada recruited more professionals, mostly from the United States, with some coming directly from the Philippines. Most of the nurses, technicians, office workers and doctors arrived in Winnipeg, Manitoba. In the late 1960s, more Filipinos came to Winnipeg to work in the garment industry.

Pakistanis began migrating to Canada in small numbers in the late 1950s and early 1960s. Immigration regulations gave preference to those with advanced education and professional skills, and the Pakistanis who came during this period, and throughout the 1960s, generally had excellent credentials. Many of them considered themselves to be sojourners, who had come to earn but not to settle or were students who intended to return home when their degree programs were completed. While some went back, others remained to become the founding members of the Pakistani-Canadian community. Pakistani nationals were registered in undergraduate and graduate programs at McGill University in Montreal as early as 1949, and at the University of Toronto from 1958 on. By the mid-1950s, there were five or six Pakistani families living in Montreal in addition to the students. This was probably the then largest concentration of Pakistanis in the country. Throughout the 1950s, 1960s and 1970s most who arrived were young men pursuing graduate or professional studies.

Unlike Korean Americans who have relatively much longer history settling in the United States, very few settled in Canada; as late as 1965, the total permanent Korean population of Canada was estimated at only 70. However, with the 1966 reform of Canadian immigration laws, South Korean immigration to Canada began to grow. By 1969, there were an estimated 2000 Koreans in Canada.

The Iranian revolution of 1979 resulted in a spike of immigration to Canada from the West Asian country. In the aftermath, many Iranian-Canadians began to categorize themselves as "Persian" rather than "Iranian", mainly to dissociate themselves from the Islamic regime of Iran and the negativity associated with it, and also to distinguish themselves as being of Persian ethnicity.

During and after the Vietnam War, a large wave of Vietnamese refugees began arriving in Canada. Large-scale Vietnamese immigration to Canada began during the mid-1970s and early 1980s as refugees or boat people following the end of the Vietnam War in 1975, though a couple thousand were already living in Quebec before then, most of whom were students. After the fall of Saigon, there were two waves of Vietnamese immigrants to Canada. The first wave consisted mostly of middle-class immigrants. Many of these immigrants were able to speak French and or English and were welcomed into Canada for their professional skills. The second wave consisted of Southern Vietnamese refugees who were escaping the harsh regime that had taken over the former South Vietnam. Many of them (10%) were of Chinese descent and were escaping ethnic persecution resulting from the Sino-Vietnamese War. These south Vietnamese refugees were known globally as the "boat people". In the years 1979–80, Canada accepted 60,000 Vietnamese refugees.

Many new Vietnamese arrivees were sponsored by groups of individuals, temples, and churches and settled in areas around Southern Ontario, Vancouver, British Columbia, and Montreal, Quebec. Between 1975 and 1985, 110,000 resettled in Canada (23,000 in Ontario; 13,000 in Quebec; 8,000 in Alberta; 7,000 British Columbia; 5,000 in Manitoba; 3,000 in Saskatchewan; and 2,000 in the Maritime provinces). This was followed by another large wave of Vietnamese immigration to Canada during the late 1980s and 1990s as both refugees and immigrant classes of post-war Vietnam entered Canada. These groups settled in urban areas, in particular Toronto, Vancouver, Montreal, and Calgary. In Metro Vancouver, they have settled mainly in East Vancouver, Richmond, and Surrey. In the Montreal area, they settle in Montreal's downtown, South Shore, and the suburb of Laval. In Toronto, they have settled in the city's Chinatown area near Spadina Avenue and Dundas Street West and in the inner suburbs of North York, York, Scarborough, and Etobicoke.

The Canadian Parliament created the Asia Pacific Foundation of Canada in 1985 to better address issues surrounding Asia–Canada relations, including trade, citizenship and immigration.

In the late 1990s, South Korea became the fifth-largest source of immigrants to Canada. Toronto has the country's largest absolute number of Koreans, but Vancouver is experiencing the highest rate of growth in its Korean population, with a 69% increase since 1996. Montreal was the third most popular destination for Korean migrants during this period. The 1990s growth in South Korean migration to Canada occurred at a time when Canadian unemployment was high and income growth was low relative to the United States. One pair of researchers demonstrated that numbers of migrants were correlated with the exchange rate; the weakness of the Canadian dollar relative to the United States dollar meant that South Korean migrants bringing savings to Canada for investment would be relatively richer than those going to the United States. Other factors suggested as drivers behind the growth of South Korean immigration to Canada included domestic anti-Americanism and the large presence of Canadian English teachers in local hagwon.

When Hong Kong reverted to Chinese rule, people emigrated and found new homes in Canada.

=== 21st century ===
In 2016, the Canadian government issued a full apology in Parliament for the Komagata Maru Incident.

According to Statistics Canada, in 2016, 48.1% of the immigrant population in Canada was born in Asia. Furthermore, Asian countries accounted for seven of the top ten countries of birth for recent immigrants, including the Philippines, India, China, Iran, Pakistan, Syria and South Korea.

In recent decades, a large number of people have come to Canada from India and other South Asian countries. As of 2016, South Asians make up nearly 17% of the Greater Toronto Area's population, and are projected to make up 24% of the region's population by 2031.

In the contemporary era, Asians form a significant minority within the national population, with over 7 million Canadians being of Asian geographical descent as of 2021.

Asian Canadian students, in particular those of East Asian or South Asian background, make up the vast majority of students at several Canadian universities.

== Demography ==
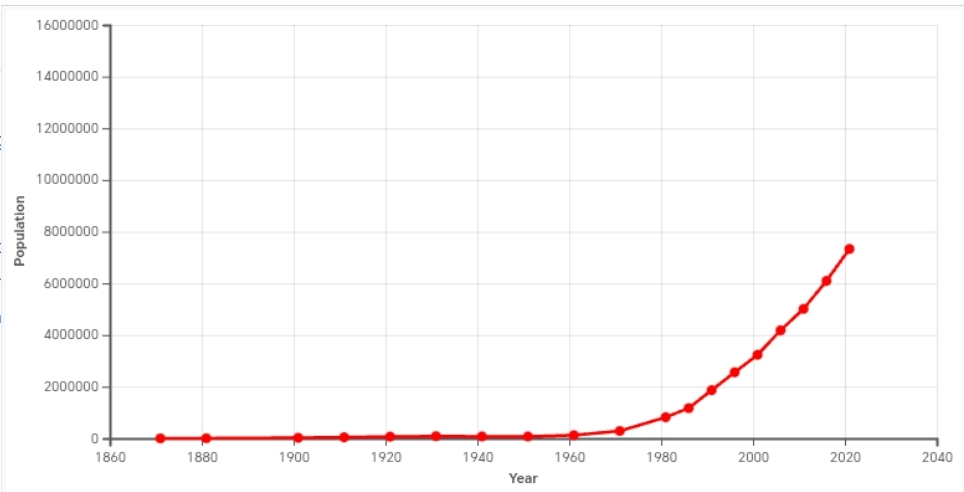
Canadians of Asian descent total population (1871–2021)

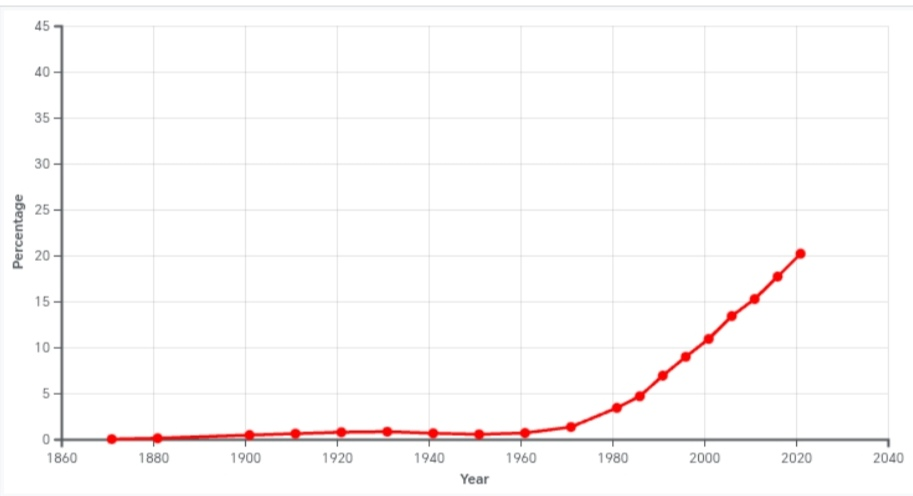
Canadians of Asian descent percentage of the total population (1871–2021)

=== Population ===
Asian Canadian Population History 1871–2021
| Year | Population | % of total population |
|---|---|---|
| 1871 | 4 | 0% |
| 1881 | 4,383 | 0.101% |
| 1901 | 23,731 | 0.442% |
| 1911 | 43,213 | 0.6% |
| 1921 | 65,914 | 0.75% |
| 1931 | 84,548 | 0.815% |
| 1941 | 74,064 | 0.644% |
| 1951 | 72,827 | 0.52% |
| 1961 | 121,753 | 0.668% |
| 1971 | 285,540 | 1.324% |
| 1981 | 818,670 | 3.399% |
| 1986 | 1,169,205 | 4.673% |
| 1991 | 1,865,435 | 6.911% |
| 1996 | 2,555,590 | 8.958% |
| 2001 | 3,234,290 | 10.912% |
| 2006 | 4,181,755 | 13.385% |
| 2011 | 5,011,220 | 15.254% |
| 2016 | 6,095,235 | 17.688% |
| 2021 | 7,331,610 | 20.181% |

=== National and ethnic origins ===
Asian Canadians by pan-ethnicity (2001–2021)
| Panethnic group | Percentage | | | | |
| Panethnic group | 2021 | 2016 | 2011 | 2006 | 2001 |
|---|---|---|---|---|---|
| South Asian | 35.07% | 32.21% | 32.25% | 31.49% | 29.78% |
| East Asian | 31.22% | 35.24% | 36.27% | 38.94% | 40.63% |
| Southeast Asian | 19.58% | 19.93% | 19.89% | 16.87% | 16.79% |
| West Asian & Central Asian | 14.82% | 16.59% | 15.53% | 15.61% | 14.95% |

While the Asian Canadian population is diverse, many have ancestry from a few select countries in the continent. As of the 2016 Canadian census, nearly four million or 66% of Asian Canadians can trace their roots to just three countries; China, India and the Philippines.

Population of Asian Canadian Groups 2006–2016
| Origins | 2016 | | | 2011 | | | 2006 | | |
| Origins | Pop. | % Asian Pop. | % total Pop. | Pop. | % Asian Pop. | % total Pop. | Pop. | % Asian Pop. | % total Pop. |
|---|---|---|---|---|---|---|---|---|---|
| Chinese (Note: Including Hongkongers) | 1,769,195 | 29.03% | 5.13% | 1,487,580 | 29.68% | 4.53% | 1,346,510 | 32.2% | 4.31% |
| Indian | 1,374,715 | 22.55% | 3.99% | 1,165,145 | 23.25% | 3.55% | 962,670 | 23.02% | 3.08% |
| Filipino | 851,410 | 13.97% | 2.47% | 662,600 | 13.22% | 2.02% | 436,195 | 10.43% | 1.4% |
| Vietnamese | 240,615 | 3.95% | 0.7% | 220,425 | 4.4% | 0.67% | 180,130 | 4.31% | 0.58% |
| Lebanese | 219,555 | 3.6% | 0.64% | 190,275 | 3.8% | 0.58% | 165,150 | 3.95% | 0.53% |
| Pakistani | 215,560 | 3.54% | 0.63% | 155,310 | 3.1% | 0.47% | 124,730 | 2.98% | 0.4% |
| Iranian | 210,405 | 3.45% | 0.61% | 163,290 | 3.26% | 0.5% | 121,505 | 2.91% | 0.39% |
| Korean | 198,210 | 3.25% | 0.58% | 168,890 | 3.37% | 0.51% | 146,545 | 3.5% | 0.47% |
| Sri Lankan | 152,595 | 2.5% | 0.44% | 139,415 | 2.78% | 0.42% | 103,625 | 2.48% | 0.33% |
| Japanese | 121,485 | 1.99% | 0.35% | 109,740 | 2.19% | 0.33% | 98,905 | 2.37% | 0.32% |
| Punjabi | 118,395 | 1.94% | 0.34% | 76,150 | 1.52% | 0.23% | 53,515 | 1.28% | 0.17% |
| Arab (n.o.s) (Note: Not otherwise specified) | 111,405 | 1.83% | 0.32% | 94,640 | 1.89% | 0.29% | 86,135 | 2.06% | 0.28% |
| Afghan | 83,995 | 1.38% | 0.24% | 62,815 | 1.25% | 0.19% | 48,090 | 1.15% | 0.15% |
| Syrian | 77,045 | 1.26% | 0.22% | 40,840 | 0.81% | 0.12% | 31,370 | 0.75% | 0.1% |
| South Asian (n.i.e.) (Note: Not included elsewhere) | 76,400 | 1.25% | 0.22% | 53,390 | 1.07% | 0.16% | 60,895 | 1.46% | 0.19% |
| Iraqi | 70,920 | 1.16% | 0.21% | 49,680 | 0.99% | 0.15% | 29,950 | 0.72% | 0.1% |
| Turkish | 63,995 | 1.05% | 0.19% | 55,430 | 1.11% | 0.17% | 43,700 | 1.05% | 0.14% |
| Armenian | 63,810 | 1.05% | 0.19% | 55,740 | 1.11% | 0.17% | 50,500 | 1.21% | 0.16% |
| Tamil | 48,670 | 0.8% | 0.14% | 48,965 | 0.98% | 0.15% | 34,590 | 0.83% | 0.11% |
| Bangladeshi | 45,940 | 0.75% | 0.13% | 34,205 | 0.68% | 0.1% | 24,595 | 0.59% | 0.08% |
| Palestinian | 44,820 | 0.74% | 0.13% | 31,245 | 0.62% | 0.1% | 23,975 | 0.57% | 0.08% |
| Cambodian | 38,495 | 0.63% | 0.11% | 34,340 | 0.69% | 0.1% | 25,245 | 0.6% | 0.08% |
| Taiwanese | 36,515 (94,000– 173,000) | 0.6% (1.54%– 2.84%) | 0.11% (0.27%– 0.5%) | 30,330 | 0.61% | 0.09% | 17,705 | 0.42% | 0.06% |
| Israeli | 28,735 | 0.47% | 0.08% | 15,010 | 0.3% | 0.05% | 10,755 | 0.26% | 0.03% |
| West Central; Asian and Middle Eastern (n.i.e.) | 25,280 | 0.41% | 0.07% | 16,540 | 0.33% | 0.05% | 12,075 | 0.29% | 0.04% |
| Laotian | 24,575 | 0.4% | 0.07% | 22,090 | 0.44% | 0.07% | 20,110 | 0.48% | 0.06% |
| Bengali | 22,900 | 0.38% | 0.07% | 17,960 | 0.36% | 0.05% | 12,130 | 0.29% | 0.04% |
| Other; Asian(n.i.e.) | 22,745 | 0.37% | 0.07% | 20,115 | 0.4% | 0.06% | 555 | 0.01% | 0% |
| Indonesian | 21,395 | 0.35% | 0.06% | 18,125 | 0.36% | 0.06% | 14,325 | 0.34% | 0.05% |
| Thai | 19,010 | 0.31% | 0.06% | 15,080 | 0.3% | 0.05% | 10,020 | 0.24% | 0.03% |
| Nepali | 17,140 | 0.28% | 0.05% | 9,780 | 0.2% | 0.03% | 3,780 | 0.09% | 0.01% |
| Malaysian | 16,920 | 0.28% | 0.05% | 14,165 | 0.28% | 0.04% | 12,165 | 0.29% | 0.04% |
| Kurdish | 16,315 | 0.27% | 0.05% | 11,685 | 0.23% | 0.04% | 9,205 | 0.22% | 0.03% |
| Jordanian | 14,250 | 0.23% | 0.04% | 9,425 | 0.19% | 0.03% | 6,905 | 0.17% | 0.02% |
| Assyrian | 13,830 | 0.23% | 0.04% | 10,810 | 0.22% | 0.03% | 8,650 | 0.21% | 0.03% |
| Burmese | 9,330 | 0.15% | 0.03% | 7,845 | 0.16% | 0.02% | 4,590 | 0.11% | 0.01% |
| Gujarati | 8,350 | 0.14% | 0.02% | 5,890 | 0.12% | 0.02% | 2,975 | 0.07% | 0.01% |
| Tibetan | 8,040 | 0.13% | 0.02% | 5,820 | 0.12% | 0.02% | 4,275 | 0.1% | 0.01% |
| Mongolian | 7,475 | 0.12% | 0.02% | 5,355 | 0.11% | 0.02% | 3,960 | 0.09% | 0.01% |
| Sinhalese | 7,285 | 0.12% | 0.02% | 7,220 | 0.14% | 0.02% | 5,825 | 0.14% | 0.02% |
| Saudi; Arabian | 6,810 | 0.11% | 0.02% | 7,955 | 0.16% | 0.02% | 2,730 | 0.07% | 0.01% |
| Yemeni | 6,645 | 0.11% | 0.02% | 3,945 | 0.08% | 0.01% | 2,300 | 0.06% | 0.01% |
| East and Southeast; Asian(n.i.e.) | 6,505 | 0.11% | 0.02% | 9,045 | 0.18% | 0.03% | 8,990 | 0.21% | 0.03% |
| Azerbaijani | 6,425 | 0.11% | 0.02% | 4,580 | 0.09% | 0.01% | 3,465 | 0.08% | 0.01% |
| Goan | 6,070 | 0.1% | 0.02% | 5,125 | 0.1% | 0.02% | 4,815 | 0.12% | 0.02% |
| Tatar | 4,825 | 0.08% | 0.01% | 2,850 | 0.06% | 0.01% | 2,300 | 0.06% | 0.01% |
| Pashtun | 4,810 | 0.08% | 0.01% | 3,315 | 0.07% | 0.01% | 1,690 | 0.04% | 0.01% |
| Georgian | 4,775 | 0.08% | 0.01% | 3,155 | 0.06% | 0.01% | 2,200 | 0.05% | 0.01% |
| Karen | 4,515 | 0.07% | 0.01% | N/A | N/A | N/A | N/A | N/A | N/A |
| Uzbek | 3,920 | 0.06% | 0.01% | 2,725 | 0.05% | 0.01% | N/A | N/A | N/A |
| Bhutanese | 3,600 | 0.06% | 0.01% | N/A | N/A | N/A | N/A | N/A | N/A |
| Kazakh | 3,330 | 0.05% | 0.01% | 2,270 | 0.05% | 0.01% | N/A | N/A | N/A |
| Kashmiri | 3,115 | 0.05% | 0.01% | 2,125 | 0.04% | 0.01% | 1,685 | 0.04% | 0.01% |
| Tajik | 2,905 | 0.05% | 0.01% | 2,400 | 0.05% | 0.01% | N/A | N/A | N/A |
| Singaporean | 2,845 | 0.05% | 0.01% | 2,050 | 0.04% | 0.01% | 1,390 | 0.03% | 0% |
| Kuwaiti | 2,240 | 0.04% | 0.01% | 2,240 | 0.04% | 0.01% | 1,575 | 0.04% | 0.01% |
| Uighur | 1,555 | 0.03% | 0% | 1,155 | 0.02% | 0% | N/A | N/A | N/A |
| Hazara | 1,520 | 0.02% | 0% | N/A | N/A | N/A | N/A | N/A | N/A |
| Kyrgyz | 1,055 | 0.02% | 0% | N/A | N/A | N/A | N/A | N/A | N/A |
| Turkmen | 1,040 | 0.02% | 0% | N/A | N/A | N/A | N/A | N/A | N/A |
| Hmong | 805 | 0.01% | 0% | 830 | 0.02% | 0% | 815 | 0.02% | 0% |
| Total; Canada | 6,095,235 | 100% | 17.69% | 5,011,220 | 100% | 15.25% | 4,181,755 | 100% | 13.39% |

Population of Asian Canadian Groups 1981–1996
| Origins | 1996 | | | 1991 | | | 1986 | | | 1981 | | |
| Origins | Pop. | % Asian Pop. | % total Pop. | Pop. | % Asian Pop. | % total Pop. | Pop. | % Asian Pop. | % total Pop. | Pop. | % Asian Pop. | % total Pop. |
|---|---|---|---|---|---|---|---|---|---|---|---|---|
| Chinese | 921,585 | 36.06% | 3.23% | 652,645 | 34.99% | 2.42% | 414,045 | 35.41% | 1.65% | 299,915 | 36.63% | 1.25% |
| Indian | 548,080 | 21.45% | 1.92% | 379,280 | 20.33% | 1.41% | 261,435 | 22.36% | 1.04% | 165,410 | 20.2% | 0.69% |
| Filipino | 242,880 | 9.5% | 0.85% | 174,975 | 9.38% | 0.65% | 107,060 | 9.16% | 0.43% | 75,485 | 9.22% | 0.31% |
| Vietnamese | 136,810 | 5.35% | 0.48% | 94,255 | 5.05% | 0.35% | 62,995 | 5.39% | 0.25% | 31,685 | 3.87% | 0.13% |
| Lebanese | 131,385 | 5.14% | 0.46% | 101,690 | 5.45% | 0.38% | 45,035 | 3.85% | 0.18% | 32,005 | 3.91% | 0.13% |
| Japanese | 77,130 | 3.02% | 0.27% | 65,680 | 3.52% | 0.24% | 54,505 | 4.66% | 0.22% | 46,060 | 5.63% | 0.19% |
| Korean | 66,655 | 2.61% | 0.23% | 45,890 | 2.46% | 0.17% | 29,705 | 2.54% | 0.12% | 22,570 | 2.76% | 0.09% |
| Iranian | 64,405 | 2.52% | 0.23% | 43,210 | 2.32% | 0.16% | 15,745 | 1.35% | 0.06% | 5,500 | 0.67% | 0.02% |
| Pakistani | 38,655 | 1.51% | 0.14% | 43,150 | 2.31% | 0.16% | 31,650 | 2.71% | 0.13% | 13,400 | 1.64% | 0.06% |
| Arab (n.i.e.) | 48,930 | 1.91% | 0.17% | 38,910 | 2.09% | 0.14% | 37,500 | 3.21% | 0.15% | 28,365 | 3.46% | 0.12% |
| Armenian | 37,500 | 1.47% | 0.13% | 33,285 | 1.78% | 0.12% | 27,385 | 2.34% | 0.11% | 21,155 | 2.58% | 0.09% |
| Sri Lankan | 46,585 | 1.82% | 0.16% | 31,435 | 1.69% | 0.12% | 7,285 | 0.62% | 0.03% | 2,400 | 0.29% | 0.01% |
| Punjabi | 49,840 | 1.95% | 0.17% | 27,300 | 1.46% | 0.1% | 15,545 | 1.33% | 0.06% | 11,005 | 1.34% | 0.05% |
| Cambodian | 21,435 | 0.84% | 0.08% | 18,615 | 1% | 0.07% | 11,790 | 1.01% | 0.05% | 4,310 | 0.53% | 0.02% |
| South; Asian (n.i.e.) | 31,335 | 1.23% | 0.11% | 17,145 | 0.92% | 0.06% | 270 | 0.02% | 0% | 26,845 | 3.28% | 0.11% |
| Tamil | 30,065 | 1.18% | 0.11% | 15,695 | 0.84% | 0.06% | 2,200 | 0.19% | 0.01% | 630 | 0.08% | 0% |
| Laotian | 17,320 | 0.68% | 0.06% | 14,840 | 0.8% | 0.05% | 11,090 | 0.95% | 0.04% | 7,145 | 0.87% | 0.03% |
| Syrian | 19,390 | 0.76% | 0.07% | 13,035 | 0.7% | 0.05% | 7,180 | 0.61% | 0.03% | 3,455 | 0.42% | 0.01% |
| Turkish | 18,130 | 0.71% | 0.06% | 12,050 | 0.65% | 0.04% | 7,555 | 0.65% | 0.03% | 4,155 | 0.51% | 0.02% |
| Afghan | 13,240 | 0.52% | 0.05% | 6,330 | 0.34% | 0.02% | N/A | N/A | N/A | N/A | N/A | N/A |
| East; Asian (n.i.e.) | 3,975 | 0.16% | 0.01% | 5,930 | 0.32% | 0.02% | 3,075 | 0.26% | 0.01% | 9,170 | 1.12% | 0.04% |
| Palestinian | 11,445 | 0.45% | 0.04% | 5,730 | 0.31% | 0.02% | 1,605 | 0.14% | 0.01% | 1,005 | 0.12% | 0% |
| Indonesian | 8,705 | 0.34% | 0.03% | 5,510 | 0.3% | 0.02% | 3,530 | 0.3% | 0.01% | 1,555 | 0.19% | 0.01% |
| Bangladeshi | 6,955 | 0.27% | 0.02% | 5,170 | 0.28% | 0.02% | 1,670 | 0.14% | 0.01% | 425 | 0.05% | 0% |
| Iraqi | 10,795 | 0.42% | 0.04% | 4,790 | 0.26% | 0.02% | N/A | N/A | N/A | N/A | N/A | N/A |
| Malay | 8,165 | 0.32% | 0.03% | 3,720 | 0.2% | 0.01% | 2,375 | 0.2% | 0.01% | 1,860 | 0.23% | 0.01% |
| Taiwanese | 7,770 | 0.3% | 0.03% | N/A | N/A | N/A | N/A | N/A | N/A | N/A | N/A | N/A |
| Thai | 5,015 | 0.2% | 0.02% | 2,770 | 0.15% | 0.01% | 2,930 | 0.25% | 0.01% | 505 | 0.06% | 0% |
| Israeli | 4,105 | 0.16% | 0.01% | 1,850 | 0.1% | 0.01% | 1,125 | 0.1% | 0% | 305 | 0.04% | 0% |
| Bengali | 3,790 | 0.15% | 0.01% | 1,520 | 0.08% | 0.01% | 590 | 0.05% | 0% | 795 | 0.1% | 0% |
| Jordanian | 2,935 | 0.11% | 0.01% | N/A | N/A | N/A | N/A | N/A | N/A | N/A | N/A | N/A |
| Gujarati | 2,155 | 0.08% | 0.01% | N/A | N/A | N/A | 1,240 | 0.11% | 0% | 1,530 | 0.19% | 0.01% |
| Sinhalese | 3,085 | 0.12% | 0.01% | 1,455 | 0.08% | 0.01% | 1,085 | 0.09% | 0% | 795 | 0.1% | 0% |
| Goan | 4,415 | 0.17% | 0.02% | N/A | N/A | N/A | N/A | N/A | N/A | N/A | N/A | N/A |
| Kurdish | 4,225 | 0.17% | 0.01% | 1,430 | 0.08% | 0.01% | N/A | N/A | N/A | N/A | N/A | N/A |
| West; Asian (n.i.e.) | 2,540 | 0.1% | 0.01% | 765 | 0.04% | 0% | N/A | N/A | N/A | N/A | N/A | N/A |
| Burmese | 2,100 | 0.08% | 0.01% | 1,220 | 0.07% | 0% | 1,405 | 0.12% | 0.01% | 400 | 0.05% | 0% |
| Mongolian | 1,200 | 0.05% | 0% | N/A | N/A | N/A | N/A | N/A | N/A | N/A | N/A | N/A |
| Tibetan | 780 | 0.03% | 0% | N/A | N/A | N/A | N/A | N/A | N/A | N/A | N/A | N/A |
| Total; Canada | 2,555,590 | 100% | 8.96% | 1,865,435 | 100% | 6.91% | 1,169,205 | 100% | 4.67% | 818,670 | 100% | 3.4% |

Population of Asian Canadian Groups 1941–1971
| Origins | 1971 | | | 1961 | | | 1951 | | | 1941 | | |
| Origins | Pop. | % Asian Pop. | % total Pop. | Pop. | % Asian Pop. | % total Pop. | Pop. | % Asian Pop. | % total Pop. | Pop. | % Asian Pop. | % total Pop. |
|---|---|---|---|---|---|---|---|---|---|---|---|---|
| Chinese | 118,815 | 41.61% | 0.55% | 58,197 | 47.8% | 0.32% | 32,528 | 44.66% | 0.23% | 34,627 | 46.75% | 0.3% |
| Indian− Pakistani | 52,100 | 18.25% | 0.24% | 6,774 | 5.56% | 0.04% | 2,148 | 2.95% | 0.02% | 1,465 | 1.98% | 0.01% |
| Japanese | 37,260 | 13.05% | 0.17% | 29,157 | 23.95% | 0.16% | 21,663 | 29.75% | 0.15% | 23,149 | 31.26% | 0.2% |
| Syrian− Lebanese | 26,665 | 9.34% | 0.12% | 19,374 | 15.91% | 0.11% | 12,301 | 16.89% | 0.09% | 11,857 | 16.01% | 0.1% |
| South; Asian (n.i.e.) | 15,830 | 5.54% | 0.07% | N/A | N/A | N/A | N/A | N/A | N/A | N/A | N/A | N/A |
| Turkish | N/A | N/A | N/A | N/A | N/A | N/A | N/A | N/A | N/A | 388 | 0.52% | 0% |
| Armenian | N/A | N/A | N/A | N/A | N/A | N/A | N/A | N/A | N/A | 2,062 | 2.78% | 0.02% |
| Other; Asian | 34,870 | 12.21% | 0.16% | 8,251 | 6.78% | 0.05% | 4,187 | 5.75% | 0.03% | 526 | 0.71% | 0% |
| Total; Canada | 285,540 | 100% | 1.32% | 121,753 | 100% | 0.67% | 72,827 | 100% | 0.52% | 74,064 | 100% | 0.64% |

Population of Asian Canadian Groups 1901–1931
| Origins | 1931 | | | 1921 | | | 1911 | | | 1901 | | |
| Origins | Pop. | % Asian Pop. | % total Pop. | Pop. | % Asian Pop. | % total Pop. | Pop. | % Asian Pop. | % total Pop. | Pop. | % Asian Pop. | % total Pop. |
|---|---|---|---|---|---|---|---|---|---|---|---|---|
| Chinese | 46,519 | 55.02% | 0.45% | 39,587 | 60.06% | 0.45% | 27,831 | 64.4% | 0.39% | 17,312 | 72.95% | 0.32% |
| Japanese | 23,342 | 27.61% | 0.22% | 15,868 | 24.07% | 0.18% | 9,067 | 20.98% | 0.13% | 4,738 | 19.97% | 0.09% |
| Syrian− Lebanese | 10,753 | 12.72% | 0.1% | 8,282 | 12.56% | 0.09% | N/A | N/A | N/A | 1,437 | 6.06% | 0.03% |
| Indian | 1,400 | 1.66% | 0.01% | 1,016 | 1.54% | 0.01% | 2,342 | 5.42% | 0.03% | N/A | N/A | N/A |
| Turkish | N/A | N/A | N/A | 313 | 0.47% | 0% | N/A | N/A | N/A | N/A | N/A | N/A |
| Armenian | N/A | N/A | N/A | 665 | 1.01% | 0.01% | N/A | N/A | N/A | N/A | N/A | N/A |
| Other; Asian | 2,534 | 3% | 0.02% | 183 | 0.28% | 0% | 3,973 | 9.19% | 0.06% | 244 | 1.03% | 0% |
| Total; Canada | 84,548 | 100% | 0.81% | 65,914 | 100% | 0.75% | 43,213 | 100% | 0.6% | 23,731 | 100% | 0.44% |

=== Language ===
Pie chart breakdown of the spoken Asian language families of Canadians from the 2016 census.
1. Indo-Iranian (31.0%)
2. Sino-Tibetan (26.8%)
3. Semitic (Asian) (13.7%)
4. Austronesian (12.3%)
5. Dravidian (4.68%)
6. Austro-Asiatic (4.21%)
7. Koreanic (3.23%)
8. Japonic (1.55%)
9. Turkic (1.13%)
10. Other (1.44%)

==== Knowledge of language ====
Many Asian Canadians speak Canadian English or Canadian French as a first language, as many multi-generational individuals do not speak Asian languages as a mother tongue, but instead may speak one or multiple (Note: The question on knowledge of languages allows for multiple responses.) as a second or third language.

As of 2016, 6,044,885 or 17.5 percent of Canadians speak an Asian language. Of this, the top five Asian tongues spoken include Mandarin (13.5%), Cantonese (11.6%), Punjabi (11.1%), Arabic (10.4%) and Tagalog (10.1%).

- Languages with 5,000 or more speakers listed.

Knowledge of Asian languages in Canada
| # | Language | Population (2016) | % Asian languages (2016) | % total population (2016) |
|---|---|---|---|---|
| 1 | Mandarin | 814,450 | 13.47% | 2.36% |
| 2 | Cantonese | 699,125 | 11.57% | 2.03% |
| 3 | Punjabi | 668,240 | 11.05% | 1.94% |
| 4 | Arabic | 629,055 | 10.41% | 1.83% |
| 5 | Tagalog (Pilipino, Filipino) | 612,735 | 10.14% | 1.78% |
| 6 | Hindi | 433,365 | 7.17% | 1.26% |
| 7 | Urdu | 322,220 | 5.33% | 0.94% |
| 8 | Persian (Farsi) | 252,320 | 4.17% | 0.73% |
| 9 | Vietnamese | 198,895 | 3.29% | 0.58% |
| 10 | Tamil | 189,860 | 3.14% | 0.55% |
| 11 | Korean | 172,755 | 2.86% | 0.5% |
| 12 | Gujarati | 149,045 | 2.47% | 0.43% |
| 13 | Bengali | 91,220 | 1.51% | 0.26% |
| 14 | Japanese | 83,090 | 1.37% | 0.24% |
| 15 | Hebrew | 75,020 | 1.24% | 0.22% |
| 16 | Turkish | 50,775 | 0.84% | 0.15% |
| 17 | Min Nan (Note: Chaochow, Teochow, Fukien, Taiwanese) | 42,840 | 0.71% | 0.12% |
| 18 | Chinese, n.o.s. | 41,690 | 0.69% | 0.12% |
| 19 | Armenian | 41,295 | 0.68% | 0.12% |
| 20 | Malayalam | 37,810 | 0.63% | 0.11% |
| 21 | Ilocano | 34,530 | 0.57% | 0.1% |
| 22 | Sinhala | 27,825 | 0.46% | 0.08% |
| 23 | Cebuano | 27,045 | 0.45% | 0.08% |
| 24 | Khmer (Cambodian) | 27,035 | 0.45% | 0.08% |
| 25 | Pashto | 23,180 | 0.38% | 0.07% |
| 26 | Telugu | 23,160 | 0.38% | 0.07% |
| 27 | Malay | 22,470 | 0.37% | 0.07% |
| 28 | Nepali | 21,380 | 0.35% | 0.06% |
| 29 | Sindhi | 20,260 | 0.34% | 0.06% |
| 30 | Assyrian; Neo-Aramaic | 19,745 | 0.33% | 0.06% |
| 31 | Lao | 17,235 | 0.29% | 0.05% |
| 32 | Wu (Shanghainese) | 16,530 | 0.27% | 0.05% |
| 33 | Marathi | 15,570 | 0.26% | 0.05% |
| 34 | Thai | 15,390 | 0.25% | 0.04% |
| 35 | Kurdish | 15,290 | 0.25% | 0.04% |
| 36 | Hakka | 12,445 | 0.21% | 0.04% |
| 37 | Indo-Iranian languages, n.i.e. | 8,875 | 0.15% | 0.03% |
| 38 | Kannada | 8,245 | 0.14% | 0.02% |
| 39 | Hiligaynon | 7,925 | 0.13% | 0.02% |
| 40 | Chaldean; Neo-Aramaic | 7,115 | 0.12% | 0.02% |
| 41 | Tibetan | 7,050 | 0.12% | 0.02% |
| 42 | Konkani | 6,790 | 0.11% | 0.02% |
| 43 | Austronesian languages, n.i.e. | 5,585 | 0.09% | 0.02% |
| 44 | Azerbaijani | 5,450 | 0.09% | 0.02% |
| 45 | Pampangan (Note: Including Kapampangan and Pampango) | 5,425 | 0.09% | 0.02% |
| 46 | Other | 37,530 | 0.62% | 0.11% |
| | Total | 6,044,885 | 100% | 17.54% |

==== Mother tongue ====
As of 2016, 4,217,365 or 12.2 percent of Canadians speak an Asian language as a mother tongue. Of this, the top five Asian tongues spoken include Mandarin (14.0%), Cantonese (13.4%), Punjabi (11.9%), Tagalog (10.2%) and Arabic (10.0%).

- Languages with 10,000 or more speakers listed.

Asian languages in Canada by number of first language speakers
| # | Mother tongue | Population (2016) | % Asian languages (2016) |
|---|---|---|---|
| 1 | Mandarin | 592,035 | 14.04% |
| 2 | Cantonese | 565,275 | 13.4% |
| 3 | Punjabi | 501,680 | 11.9% |
| 4 | Tagalog (Pilipino, Filipino) | 431,385 | 10.23% |
| 5 | Arabic | 419,895 | 9.96% |
| 6 | Persian (Farsi) | 214,200 | 5.08% |
| 7 | Urdu | 210,820 | 5% |
| 8 | Vietnamese | 156,430 | 3.71% |
| 9 | Korean | 153,425 | 3.64% |
| 10 | Tamil | 140,720 | 3.34% |
| 11 | Hindi | 110,645 | 2.62% |
| 12 | Gujarati | 108,775 | 2.58% |
| 13 | Bengali | 73,125 | 1.73% |
| 14 | Japanese | 43,640 | 1.03% |
| 15 | Chinese, n.o.s. | 38,575 | 0.91% |
| 16 | Armenian | 33,455 | 0.79% |
| 17 | Turkish | 32,815 | 0.78% |
| 18 | Min Nan | 31,795 | 0.75% |
| 19 | Malayalam | 28,570 | 0.68% |
| 20 | Ilocano | 26,345 | 0.62% |
| 21 | Khmer (Cambodian) | 20,130 | 0.48% |
| 22 | Cebuano | 19,890 | 0.47% |
| 23 | Hebrew | 19,530 | 0.46% |
| 24 | Nepali | 18,275 | 0.43% |
| 25 | Pashto | 16,910 | 0.4% |
| 26 | Sinhala | 16,335 | 0.39% |
| 27 | Assyrian; Neo-Aramaic | 16,070 | 0.38% |
| 28 | Telugu | 15,655 | 0.37% |
| 29 | Wu (Shanghainese) | 12,920 | 0.31% |
| 30 | Malay | 12,275 | 0.29% |
| 31 | Sindhi | 11,860 | 0.28% |
| 32 | Kurdish | 11,705 | 0.28% |
| 33 | Hakka | 10,910 | 0.26% |
| 34 | Other | 101,295 | 2.4% |
| Total | | 4,217,365 | 100% |

== Geographic distribution ==
=== Provinces and territories ===
The Canadian population who reported full or partial Asian ethnic origin, according to the 1951 Canadian census, 1961 Canadian census, 2001 Canadian census, 2006 Canadian census, 2011 Canadian census, and 2016 Canadian census.

Asian Canadians by province and territory (1951–2016)
| Province | 2021 | | 2016 | | 2011 | | 2006 | | 2001 | | 1961 | | 1951 | |
| Province | Pop. | % | Pop. | % | Pop. | % | Pop. | % | Pop. | % | Pop. | % | Pop. | % |
|---|---|---|---|---|---|---|---|---|---|---|---|---|---|---|
| Ontario | 3,571,265 | 25.10% | 3,100,455 | 23.41% | 2,604,590 | 20.59% | 2,214,795 | 18.41% | 1,682,890 | 14.91% | 39,277 | 0.63% | 22,138 | 0.48% |
| British Columbia | 1,496,935 | 30.45% | 1,312,445 | 28.78% | 1,122,445 | 25.96% | 975,550 | 23.94% | 802,275 | 20.74% | 40,299 | 2.47% | 25,644 | 2.2% |
| Alberta | 857,030 | 19.61% | 756,335 | 19.01% | 551,710 | 15.46% | 398,025 | 12.22% | 292,195 | 9.93% | 12,303 | 0.92% | 7,441 | 0.79% |
| Quebec | 615,870 | 7.24% | 563,150 | 7.07% | 488,905 | 6.32% | 426,815 | 5.74% | 325,270 | 4.56% | 14,801 | 0.28% | 7,714 | 0.19% |
| Manitoba | 219,725 | 16.37% | 178,650 | 14.4% | 126,600 | 10.78% | 90,415 | 7.98% | 72,040 | 6.53% | 4,177 | 0.45% | 2,867 | 0.37% |
| Saskatchewan | 125,215 | 10.72% | 99,125 | 9.26% | 55,095 | 5.46% | 28,700 | 3.01% | 23,750 | 2.47% | 4,925 | 0.53% | 2,976 | 0.36% |
| Nova Scotia | 63,965 | 6.59% | 42,495 | 4.68% | 31,875 | 3.52% | 24,595 | 2.72% | 20,505 | 2.28% | 2,979 | 0.4% | 2,266 | 0.37% |
| New Brunswick | 30,340 | 3.91% | 19,410 | 2.66% | 14,535 | 1.98% | 11,785 | 1.64% | 7,885 | 1.1% | 1,343 | 0.22% | 903 | 0.18% |
| Newfoundland and Labrador | 12,680 | 2.48% | 10,090 | 1.97% | 6,310 | 1.24% | 5,660 | 1.13% | 3,655 | 0.72% | 933 | 0.2% | 512 | 0.14% |
| Prince Edward Island | 11,815 | 7.65% | 6,485 | 4.64% | 4,360 | 3.17% | 1,775 | 1.32% | 1,250 | 0.94% | 295 | 0.28% | 279 | 0.28% |
| Northwest Territories | 3,680 | 8.96% | 3,125 | 7.6% | 2,165 | 5.31% | 2,025 | 4.93% | 1,465 | 3.95% | 69 (Note: Northwest Territories includes Nunavut, as the territory was not created until 1999.) | 0.3% | 23 | 0.14% |
| Yukon | 4,525 | 11.24% | 2,855 | 8.13% | 2,205 | 6.62% | 1,270 | 4.21% | 950 | 3.33% | 152 | 1.04% | 64 | 0.7% |
| Nunavut | 800 | 2.17% | 615 | 1.73% | 425 | 1.34% | 280 | 0.95% | 160 | 0.6% | N/A | N/A | N/A | N/A |
| Canada | 7,013,845 | 18.96% | 6,095,235 | 17.69% | 5,011,220 | 15.25% | 4,181,755 | 13.39% | 3,234,290 | 10.91% | 121,753 | 0.67% | 72,827 | 0.52% |

Asian Canadians by province and territory (1871–1941)
| Province | 1941 | | 1931 | | 1921 | | 1911 | | 1901 | | 1881 | | 1871 | |
| Province | Pop. | % | Pop. | % | Pop. | % | Pop. | % | Pop. | % | Pop. | % | Pop. | % |
|---|---|---|---|---|---|---|---|---|---|---|---|---|---|---|
| British Columbia | 42,472 | 5.19% | 50,951 | 7.34% | 39,739 | 7.57% | 30,864 | 9.39% | 19,624 | 10.98% | 4,350 | 8.8% | N/A | N/A |
| Ontario | 12,020 | 0.32% | 12,297 | 0.36% | 9,171 | 0.31% | 4,573 | 0.18% | 1,288 | 0.06% | 22 | 0% | 1 | 0% |
| Quebec | 7,119 | 0.21% | 7,034 | 0.24% | 5,218 | 0.22% | 2,343 | 0.12% | 1,600 | 0.1% | 7 | 0% | 0 | 0% |
| Alberta | 4,204 | 0.53% | 4,929 | 0.67% | 4,300 | 0.73% | 2,103 | 0.56% | 249 | 0.34% | N/A | N/A | N/A | N/A |
| Saskatchewan | 3,420 | 0.38% | 4,419 | 0.48% | 3,333 | 0.44% | 1,238 | 0.25% | 52 | 0.06% | N/A | N/A | N/A | N/A |
| Nova Scotia | 1,927 | 0.33% | 1,559 | 0.3% | 1,500 | 0.29% | 675 | 0.14% | 363 | 0.08% | 0 | 0% | 3 | 0% |
| Manitoba | 1,788 | 0.25% | 2,255 | 0.32% | 1,715 | 0.28% | 970 | 0.21% | 258 | 0.1% | 4 | 0.01% | N/A | N/A |
| New Brunswick | 836 | 0.18% | 873 | 0.21% | 807 | 0.21% | 336 | 0.1% | 252 | 0.08% | 0 | 0% | 0 | 0% |
| Prince Edward Island | 228 | 0.24% | 166 | 0.19% | 98 | 0.11% | 29 | 0.03% | 49 | 0.05% | 0 | 0% | N/A | N/A |
| Yukon | 41 | 0.83% | 54 | 1.28% | 33 | 0.79% | 82 | 0.96% | 96 | 0.35% | N/A | N/A | N/A | N/A |
| Northwest Territories | 9 | 0.07% | 11 | 0.12% | 0 | 0% | 0 | 0% | 0 | 0% | 0 | 0% | N/A | N/A |
| Canada | 74,064 | 0.64% | 84,548 | 0.81% | 65,914 | 0.75% | 43,213 | 0.6% | 23,731 | 0.44% | 4,383 | 0.1% | 4 | 0% |

=== Subdivisions with significant Asian Canadian populations ===
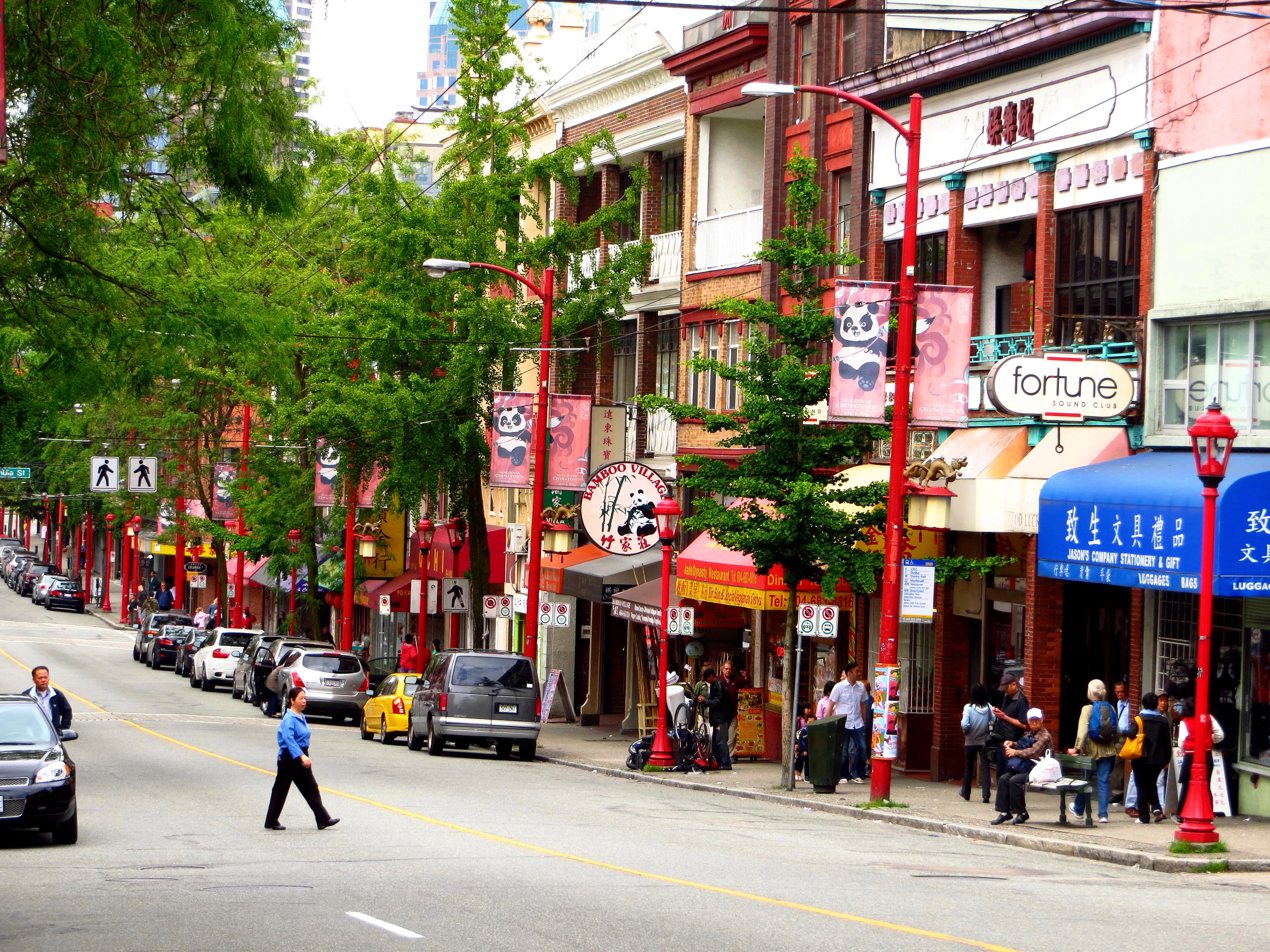
Chinatown, Vancouver

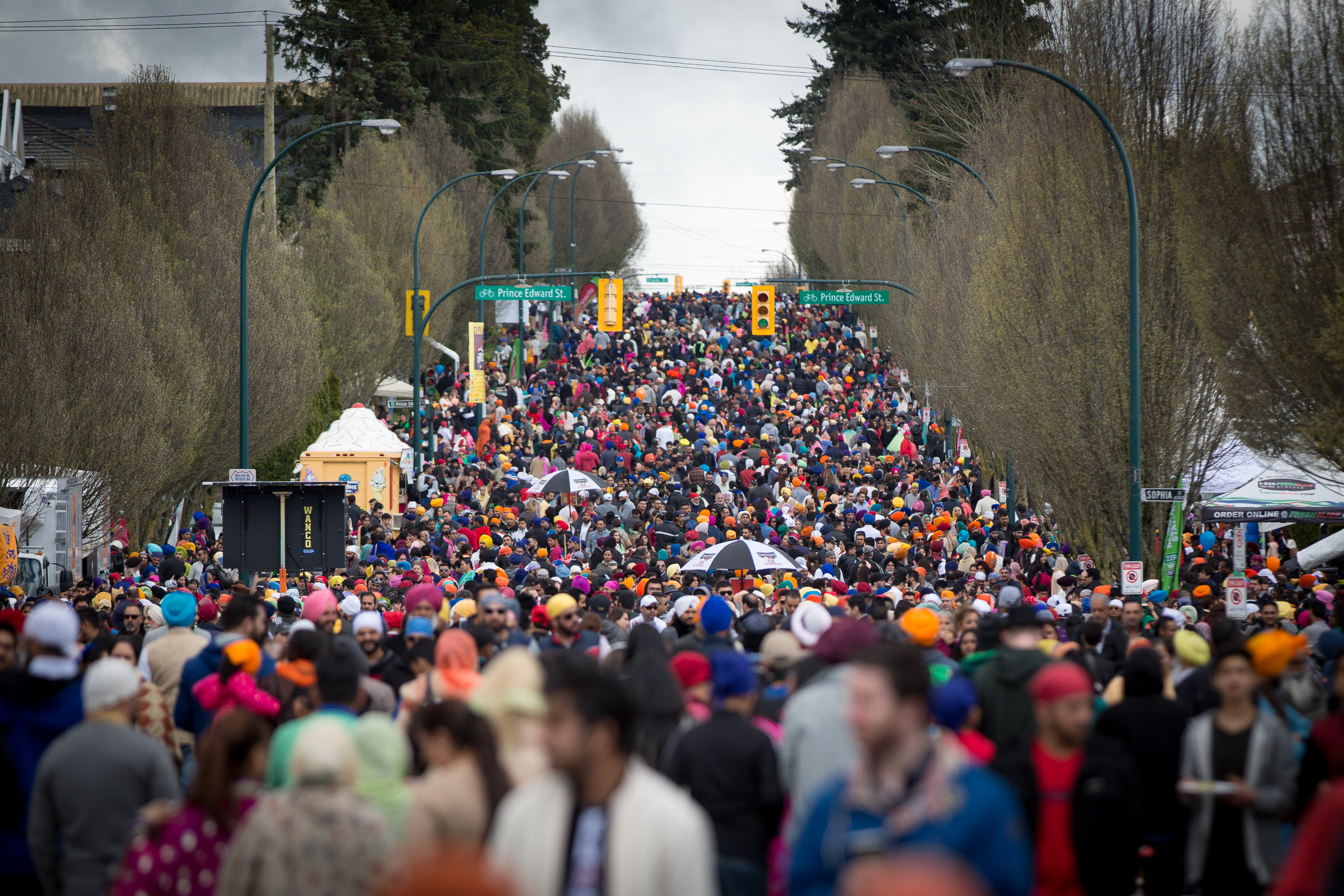
Vaisakhi Parade 2017, Punjabi Market (Little India), Vancouver

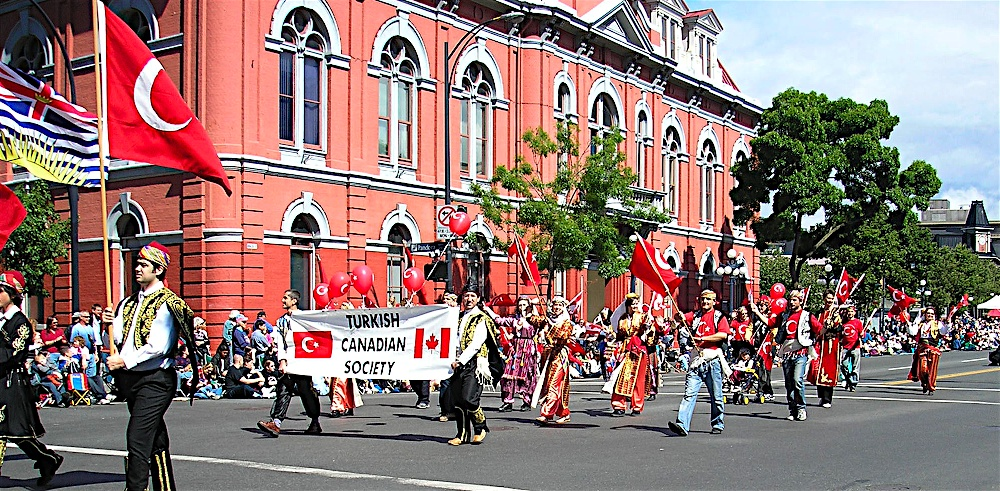
Turkish Canadians at the Victoria Day Parade 2005 in Downtown Victoria

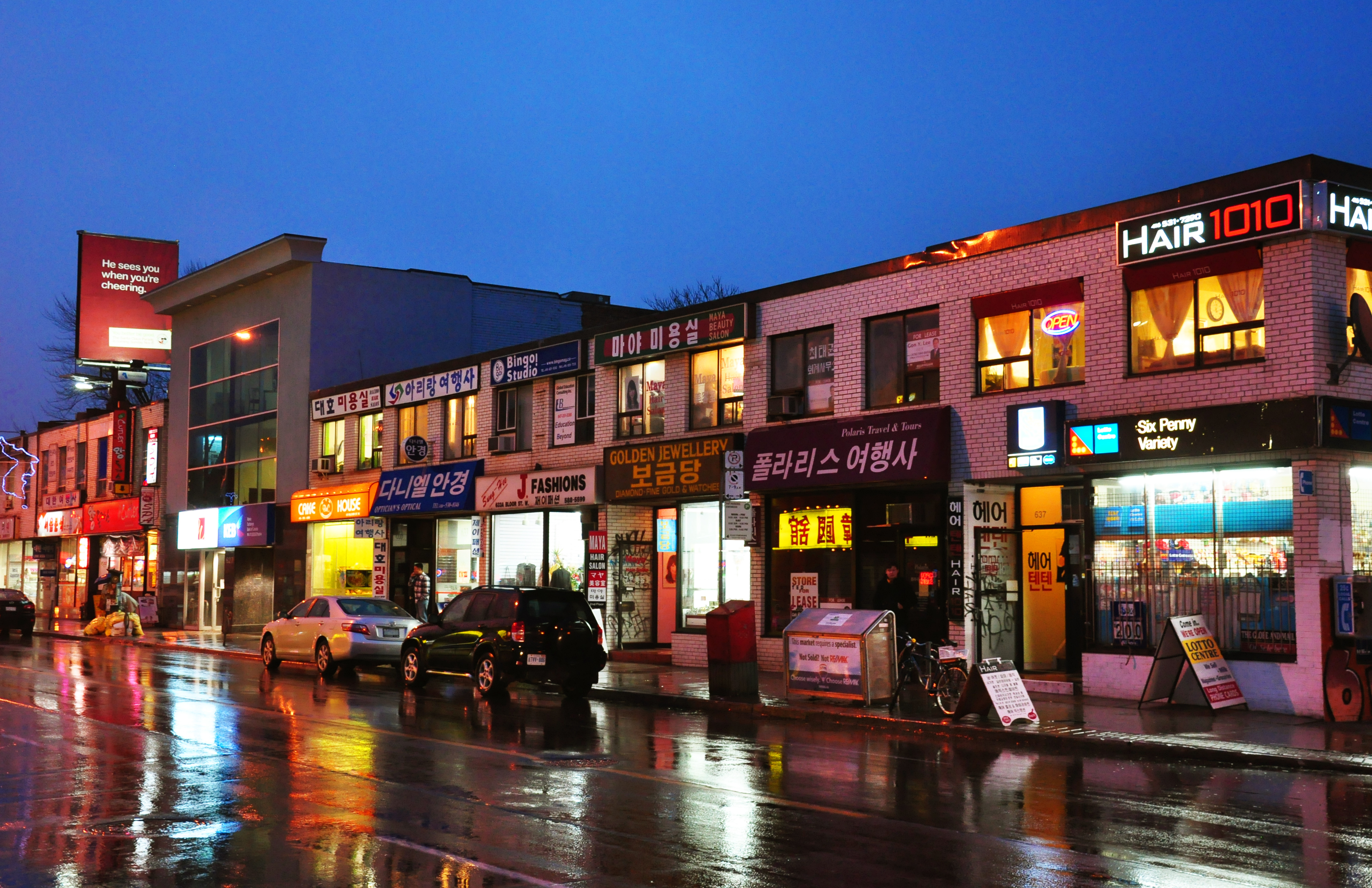
Korean businesses and restaurants along Bloor Street in Toronto's Koreatown.

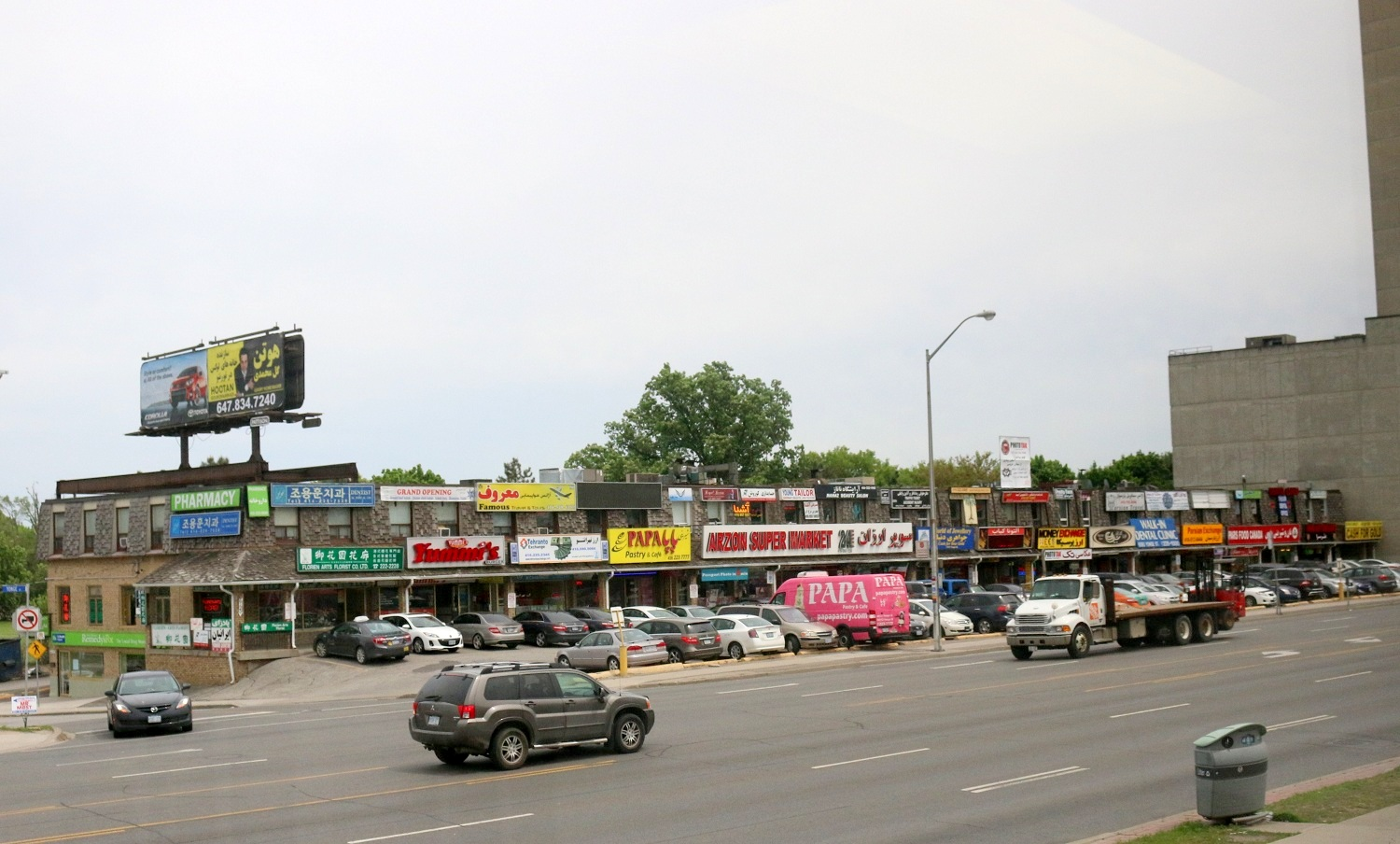
North York storefronts offering Iranian cuisine. North York has the largest West Asian population in Toronto.

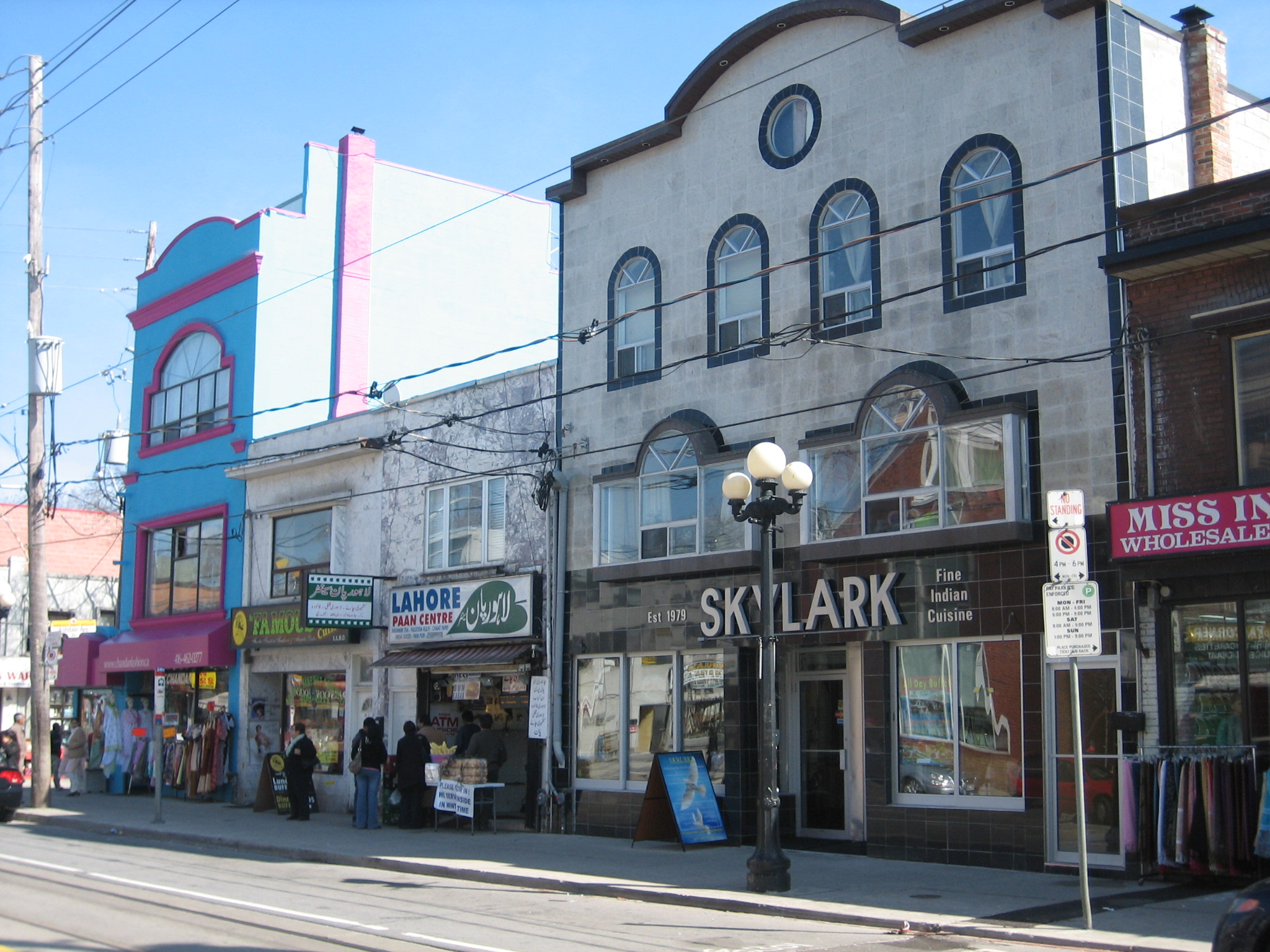
Gerrard India Bazaar (Little India) in Toronto.

Source: Canada 2016 Census

National average: 17.7%

==== Alberta ====
- Chestermere (31.8%)
- Calgary (30.0%)
- Edmonton (29.3%)
- Banff (22.4%)
- Wood Buffalo (19.4%)

==== British Columbia ====
- Richmond (74.8%)
- Greater Vancouver Electoral District A (65.7%)
- Burnaby (60.1%)
- Surrey (54.3%)
- Vancouver (49.6%)
- Coquitlam (48.2%)
- West Vancouver (38.0%)
- New Westminster (35.0%)
- Delta (34.4%)
- Abbotsford (31.8%)
- North Vancouver (31.0%)
- Port Coquitlam (29.9%)
- Port Moody (28.7%)
- North Vancouver (district) (25.8%)
- Saanich (21.0%)

==== Manitoba ====
- Winnipeg (23.2%)

==== Ontario ====
- Markham (73.9%)
- Richmond Hill (59.3%)
- Brampton (54.7%)
- Mississauga (47.0%)
- Toronto (40.1%)
- Ajax (36.9%)
- Milton (34.6%)
- Whitchurch-Stouffville (33.7%)
- Vaughan (33.5%)
- Pickering (29.5%)
- Oakville (26.5%)
- Aurora (24.5%)
- Waterloo (23.6%)
- Windsor (22.6%)
- Newmarket (22.5%)
- Ottawa (19.6%)

==== Québec ====
- Dollard-des-Ormeaux (35.4%)
- Brossard (32.3%)
- Mont Royal (30.5%)
- Kirkland (24.1%)
- Cote-Saint-Luc (21.8%)
- Westmount (20.1%)
- Pointe-Claire (19.8%)
- Montreal (18.1%)

==== Saskatchewan ====
- Lloydminster (20.4%)

== Culture ==
The concept of an Asian Canadian culture and identity is more nascent compared to Asian American culture.

=== Literature ===
Asian Canadian literary studies became significant from the 1990s onward, exploring topics related to identity politics.

== See also ==
- List of Asian-Canadian first ministers
- Demographics of Canada
- Immigration to Canada
- Asia Pacific Foundation of Canada
- East Asian Canadians
- South Asian Canadians
- West Asian Canadians
- Asian people
