= Mongolian Canadians =

Canadians of Mongolian ancestry

Total population
- 9,090

Languages
- Canadian English · Canadian French · Mongolian

Religion
- Buddhism · Christianity · Irreligion · Islam

Related ethnic groups
- Asian Canadians

Mongolian Canadians are Canadian citizens who are descended from migrants from Mongolia. According to the 2021 Census by Statistics Canada, there were 9,090 Canadians who claimed full or partial Mongolian ancestry.

The Canada Mongolia Chamber of Commerce, established by Mongolian Canadians, helps to connect business and people between the two countries.

== See also ==
- Canada–Mongolia relations
- Asian Canadians
- East Asian Canadians
