= Canada–Mongolia relations =

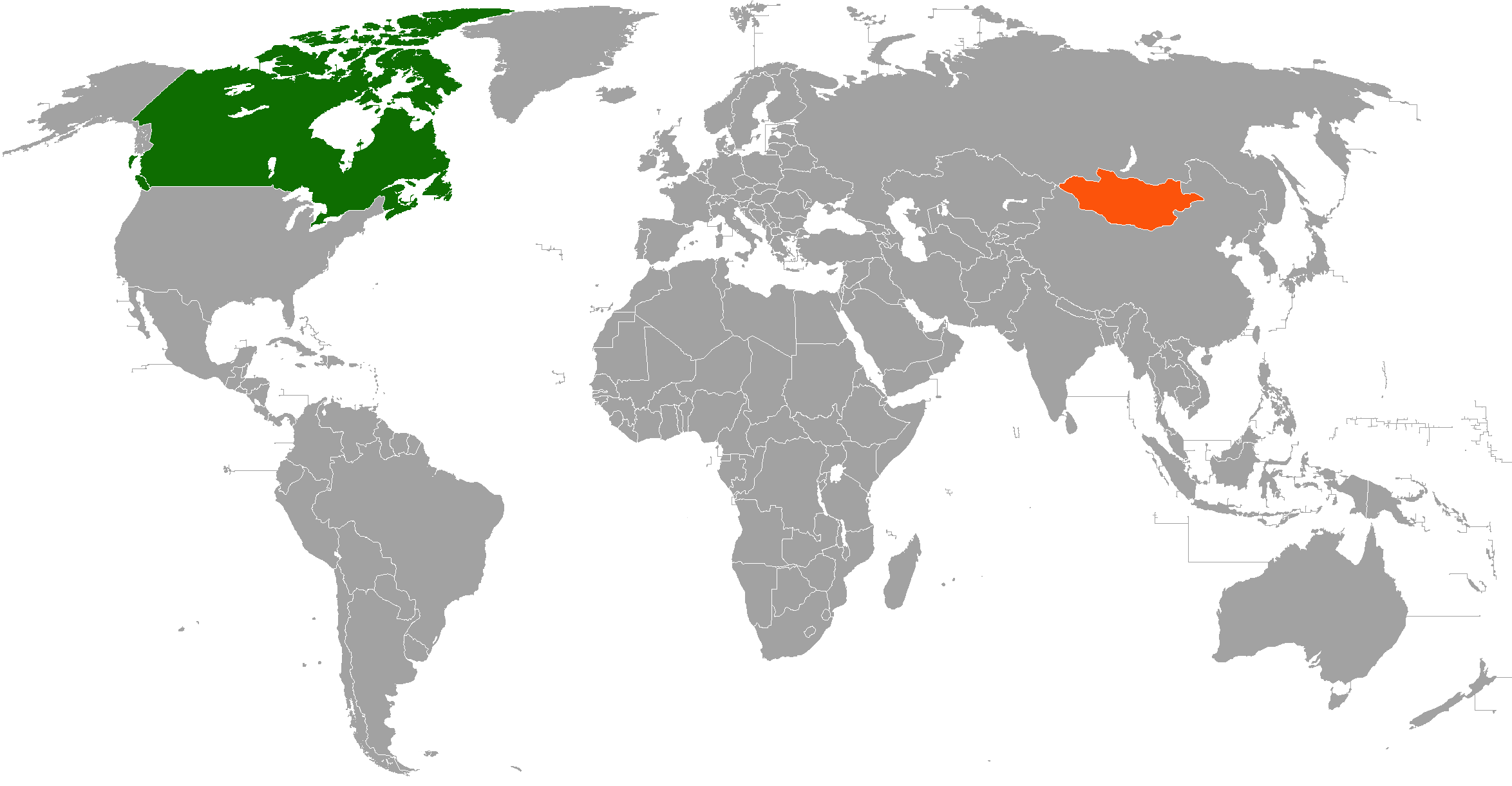

- Canada: Mongolia

Canada and Mongolia countries established diplomatic relations on November 30, 1973. Canada has been represented in Mongolia through an embassy since 2008. Mongolia has an embassy in Ottawa, and Honorary Consulates in major cities including Toronto and Calgary.

Though Canada and Mongolia established diplomatic ties in 1973, ad hoc linkages and minor activities occurred between the two countries mainly through the Canada-Mongolia Society, which disbanded in 1980. When Mongolia formed a democratic government in 1991 after the collapse of the Soviet Union, Canada began to support Mongolia with donor activities through the International Development Research Centre, Canadian International Development Agency and several non-governmental organizations.

Canada boasts as the second largest investor in Mongolia, including the giant Oyu Tolgoi copper-gold mine by Rio Tinto.

== Timeline ==
The following events occurred as diplomatic relations were established and ties strengthened:

- 1973 Diplomatic relations were established
- 2001 Embassy opens in Ottawa
- 2002 Honorary Consulate of Mongolia opened in Toronto
- 2003 Honorary Consulate of Mongolia opened in Calgary, Alberta
- 2008 Canada's first resident Ambassador to Mongolia Anna Biolik presented her credentials to the President of Mongolia

== Resident diplomatic missions ==
Embassy of Mongolia in Ottawa
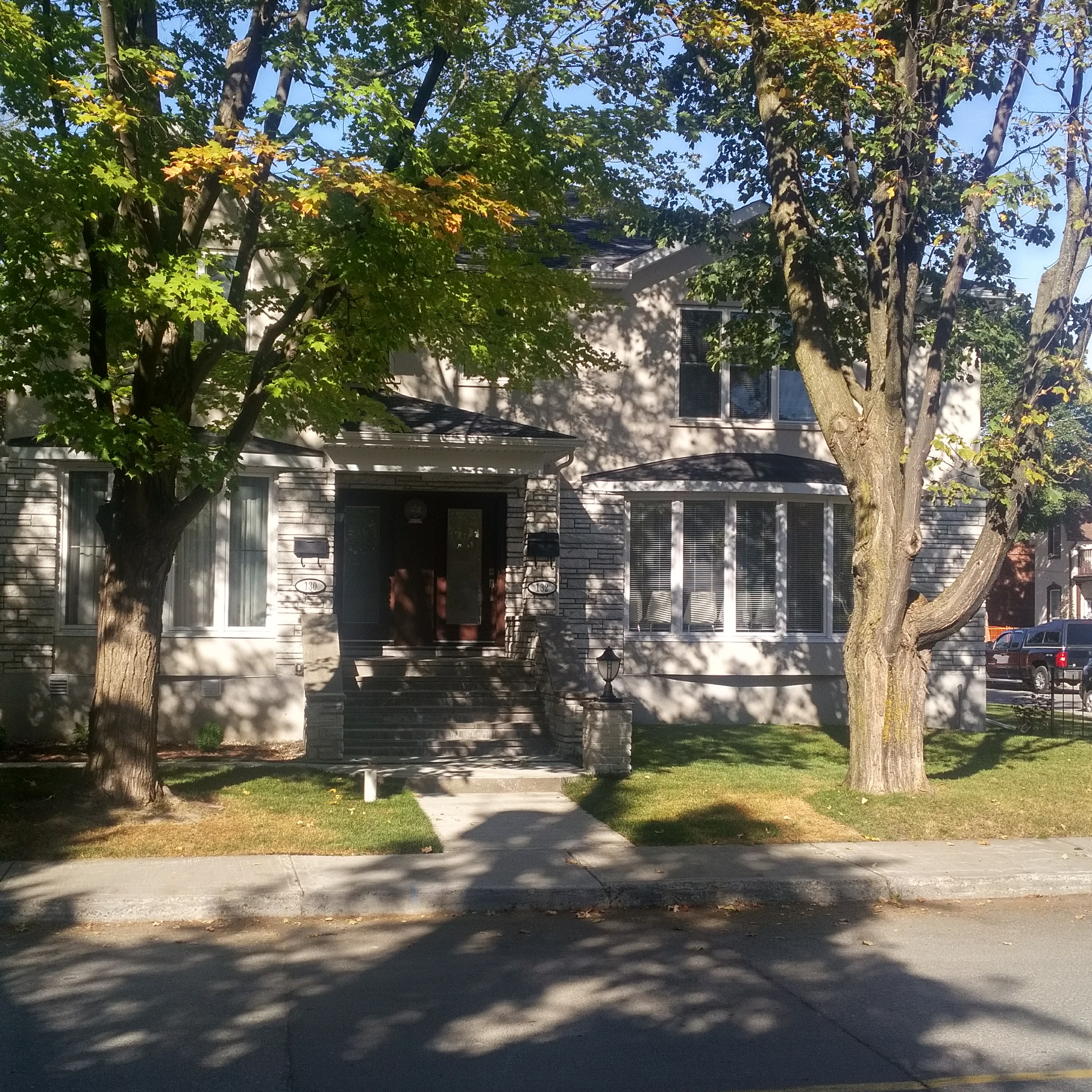
- Embassy of Mongolia, Ottawa
- Location: New Edinburgh district, Ottawa, Ontario; K1M 1N9
- Address: 132 Stanley Avenue
- Ambassador: Sarantogos Erdenetsogt

Embassy of Canada in Ulaanbaatar
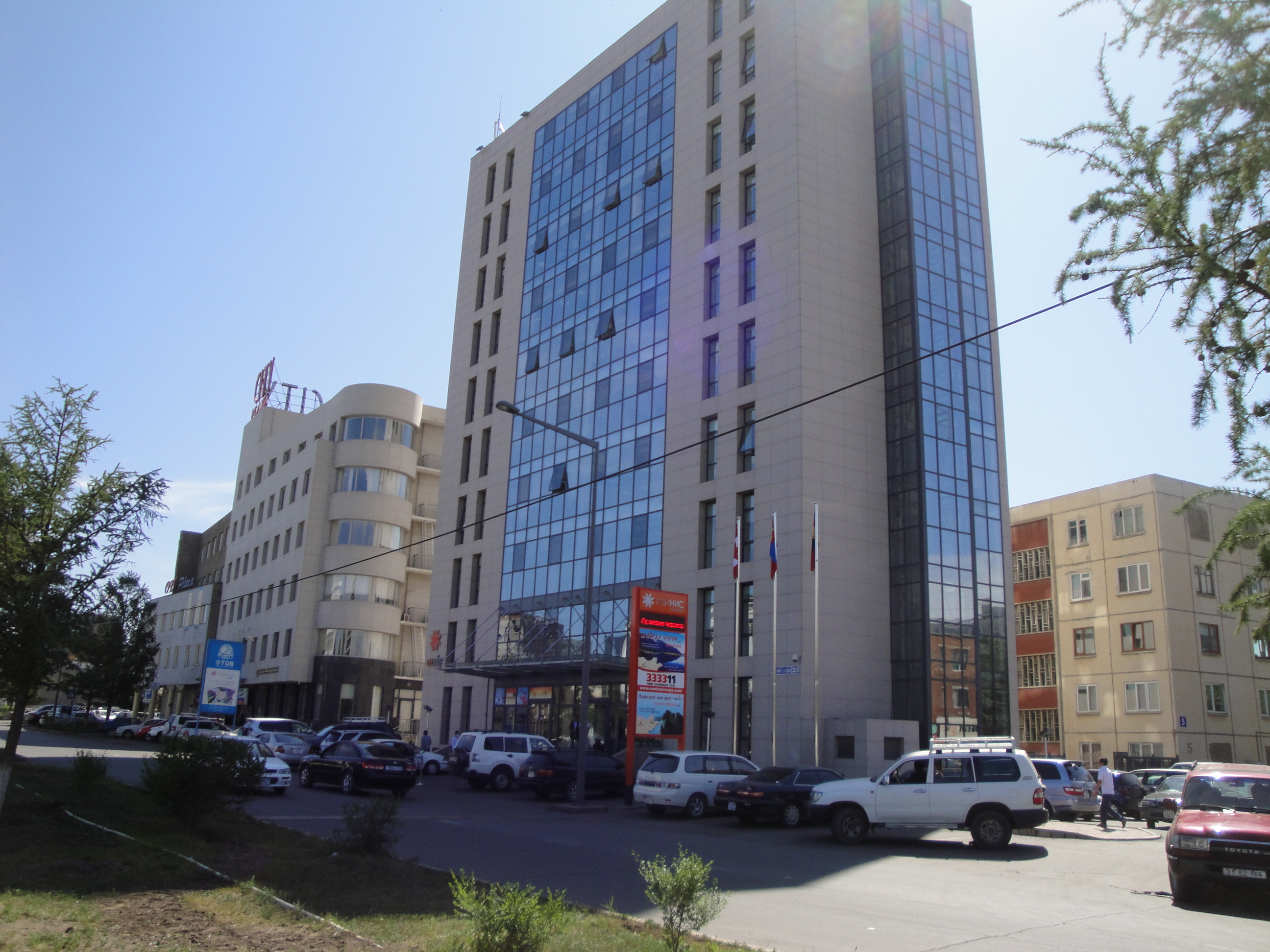
- Embassy of Canada, Ulaanbaatar at the Bodi Tower
- Location: Sükhbaatar District; Ulaanbaatar, Mongolia
- Address: Bodi Tower, 7th Floor
- Ambassador: Sandra Choufani

The Embassy of Mongolia in Canada is located at 132 Stanley Avenue, Ottawa, Ontario, Canada with an Honorary Consulate branch at 130 Albert St. Suite 1620. Mongolia opened its embassy in Canada on July 1, 2001. Mongolia also maintains Honorary Consulates in Toronto, Vancouver, Montreal, Calgary, and Regina.

The Embassy of Canada in Mongolia is located in Ulaanbaatar at the Sükhbaatar Square.

== State visits ==
- 1994 - Tserenpiliyn Gombosuren, the minister for foreign affairs of Mongolia visited Canada.
- 2004 - Mongolian President Natsagiin Bagabandi made a 7-day official visit to Canada in 2004. After a meeting with Prime Minister Paul Martin, the leaders stated that regular Canadian-Mongolian Roundtable meetings, discussing relations between the two countries and other areas of mutual interest, should be held.
- 2010 - September visit by Mongolian Prime Minister S. Batbold to Ottawa, Toronto and Vancouver
- 2013 - October, Canada's Governor General David Johnston conducted a state visit to Mongolia.
- 2014 - July, Canada's Minister of Foreign Affairs John Baird conducted an official visit to Mongolia

== Agreements ==
- 2002 The Tourism Union of Mongolia and the UK Ecological Tourism Organization signed an agreement. It was signed by U. Damdinsuren, the president of the Tourism Union of Mongolia, and the UK ambassador, Philip Rouse.

== Trade ==
Canada is the second largest investor in Mongolia. There are 20 mining and exploration firms that as of 2008 invested approximately $400 million in Mongolia. Ivanhoe Mines and Rio Tinto were in disagreement with Mongolia over the sharing of profits of the Oyu Tolgoi copper and gold mine.

The Canada-Mongolia Chamber of Commerce, established in 2014, helps to connect businesses and people in both countries. The chamber advocates a sustainable and competitive business environment for all businesses and communities in Canada and Mongolia. Amar Adiya served as the president of the Canada-Mongolia Chamber of Commerce.

== See also ==
- Foreign relations of Canada
- Foreign relations of Mongolia
- Mongolian Canadians
