= East Asian Canadians =

Canadians of East Asian origin

- East Asian ancestry % in Canada (2021)

Total population
- 2,288,775 (Note: Chinese: 1,715,770 persons Korean: 218,140 persons Japanese: 129,425 persons Hong Konger: 81,680 persons Taiwanese: 64,020 persons Tibetan: 9,350 persons Mongolian: 9,090 persons Other East Asian: 61,300 persons) (Note: Statistic includes combined population of Chinese Canadians, Hong Kong Canadians, Japanese Canadians, Korean Canadians, Mongolian Canadians, Taiwanese Canadians, Tibetan Canadians, and Other East Asian Canadians.); 6.3% of the total Canadian population (2021)

Regions with significant populations
- Southern Ontario, Metro Vancouver, Central Alberta, Montreal

Languages
- Canadian English · Canadian French · Mandarin · Cantonese · Korean · Japanese · Mongolian · Min Nan · Tibetan; Other East Asian Languages

Religion
- Buddhism · Chinese folk religion · Christianity · Confucianism · Shintoism · Taoism · Irreligion

Related ethnic groups
- East Asian diaspora

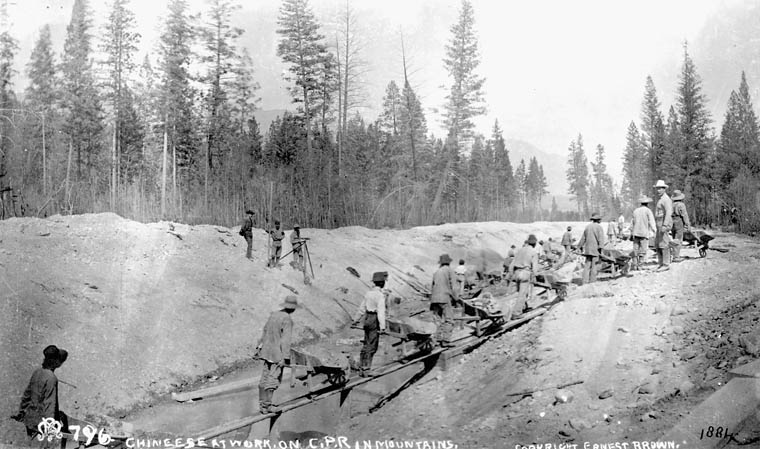
Chinese labourers working on the Canadian Pacific Railway, 1884

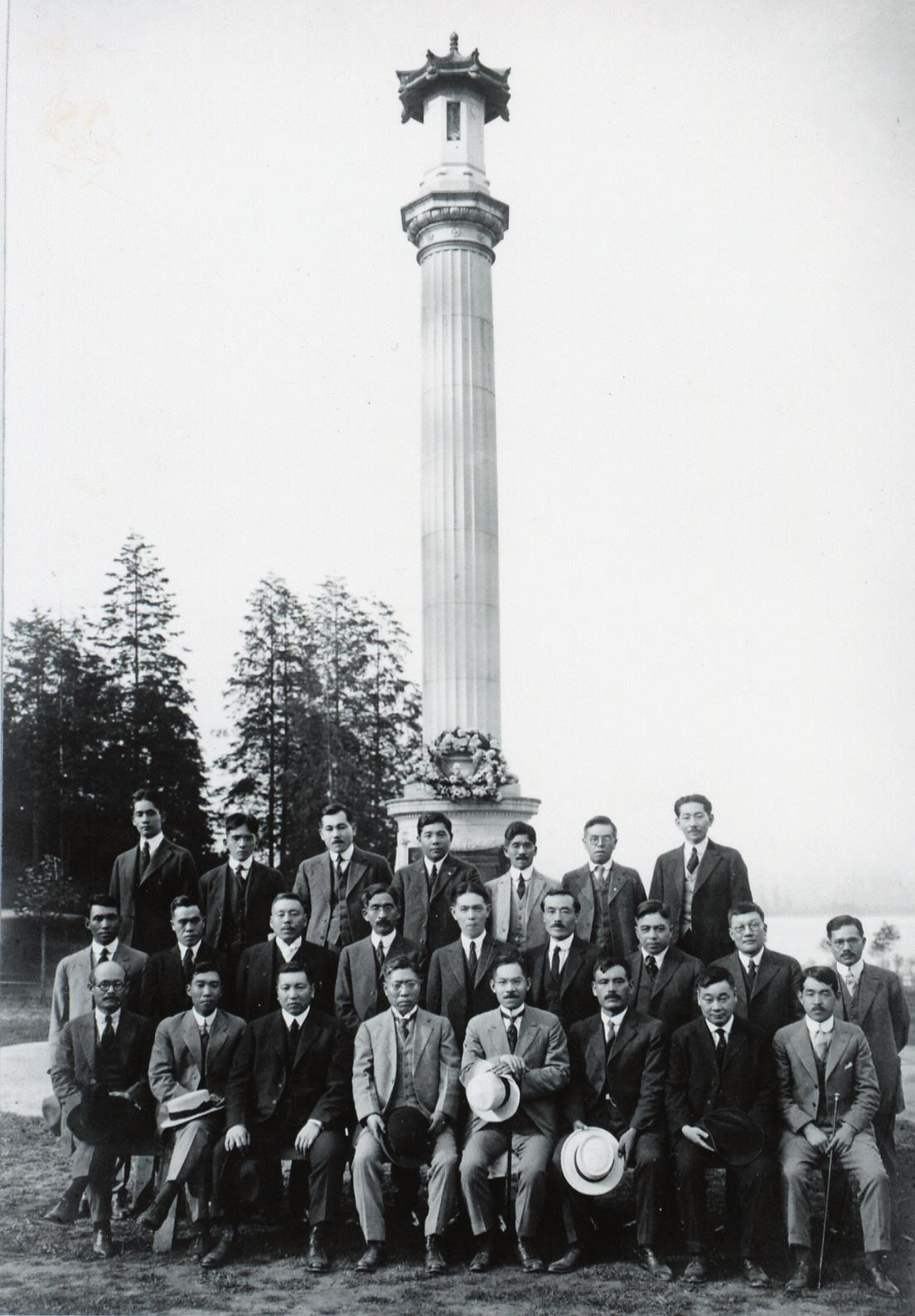
Founding members of the Canadian Japanese Association at the Japanese Canadian War Memorial in Vancouver, 1920.

East Asian Canadians are Canadians who were either born in or can trace their ancestry to East Asia. East Asian Canadians are also a subgroup of Asian Canadians. According to Statistics Canada, East Asian Canadians are considered visible minorities and can be further divided by on the basis of both ethnicity and nationality, such as Chinese Canadian, Hong Kong Canadian, Japanese Canadian, Korean Canadian, Mongolian Canadian, Taiwanese Canadian, or Tibetan Canadian, as seen on demi-decadal census data.

According to the 2021 Canadian census, 2,288,775 Canadians had trace their ancestry to East Asia, constituting 6.3 percent of the total population and 31.2 percent of the total Asian Canadian population. Additionally as of 2021, East Asians comprise the third largest pan-ethnic group in Canada after Europeans (69.8 percent) and South Asians (7.1 percent).

== Terminology ==
For Canadian government census purposes and contemporary Canadian parlance, East Asian Canadians are typically identified and referred under the term "Asian"; popular usage of this term in Canada generally excludes both South and West Asians, both groups with ancestral origins in the Middle East and in the Indian subcontinent respectively, and instead solely referring to individuals who trace their ancestry to the East Asian mainland.

== History ==
East Asian Canadian Population History
Year	Pop.	±%
2001	1,314,225	—
2006	1,628,260	+23.9%
2011	1,817,590	+11.6%
2016	2,148,230	+18.2%
2021	2,288,775	+6.5%
Source: Statistics Canada

=== 18th century ===
The first record of East Asians in what is known as Canada today can be dated back to 1788 when renegade British Captain John Meares hired a group of Chinese carpenters from Macau and employed them to build a ship at Nootka Sound, Vancouver Island, British Columbia. After the outpost was seized by Spanish forces, the eventual whereabouts of the carpenters was largely unknown.

=== 19th century ===
In the mid-late 19th century, early settlers from East Asia, namely China and Japan, emigrated to Canada, predominantly settling in the province of British Columbia.

During the mid-19th century, many Chinese arrived to take part in the British Columbia gold rushes. Beginning in 1858, early settlers formed Victoria's Chinatown and other Chinese communities in New Westminster, Yale, and Lillooet. Estimates indicate that about 1/3 of the non-native population of the Fraser goldfields was Chinese. Later, the construction of the Canadian Pacific Railway prompted another wave of immigration from China. Mainly hailing from Guangdong, the Chinese helped build the Canadian Pacific Railway through the Fraser Canyon.

Many Japanese people also arrived in Canada during the mid to late 19th century and became fishermen and merchants in British Columbia. Early immigrants from Japan most notably worked in canneries such as Steveston along the pacific coast.

By 1884, Nanaimo, New Westminster, Yale, and Victoria had the largest Chinese populations in the province. Other settlements such as Quesnelle Forks were majority Chinese and many early immigrants from there settled on Vancouver Island, most notably in Cumberland. In addition to work on the railway, most Chinese in the late 19th century British Columbia lived among other Chinese and worked in market gardens, coal mines, sawmills, and salmon canneries.

In 1885, soon after the construction on the railway was completed, the federal government passed the Chinese Immigration Act, whereby the government began to charge a substantial head tax for each Chinese person trying to immigrate to Canada. A decade later, the fear of the "Yellow Peril" prompted the government of Mackenzie Bowell to pass an act forbidding any East Asian Canadian from voting or holding office.

Many Chinese workers settled in Canada after the railway was constructed, however most could not bring the rest of their families, including immediate relatives, due to government restrictions and enormous processing fees. They established Chinatowns and societies in undesirable sections of the cities, such as East Pender Street in Vancouver, which had been the focus of the early city's red-light district until Chinese merchants took over the area from the 1890s onwards.

=== 20th century ===
Immigration restrictions stemming from anti-East Asian sentiment in Canada continued during the early 20th century. Parliament voted to increase the Chinese head tax to $500 in 1902; this temporarily caused Chinese immigration to Canada to stop. However, in following years, Chinese immigration to Canada recommenced as many saved up money to pay the head tax.

Heightened anti-East Asian sentiment resulted in the infamous anti-East Asian pogrom in Vancouver in 1907. Spurred by similar riots in Bellingham targeting Punjabi Sikh South Asian settlers, the Asiatic Exclusion League organized attacks against homes and businesses owned by East Asian immigrants under the slogan "White Canada Forever!"; though no one was killed, much property damage was done and numerous East Asian Canadians, namely Chinese and Japanese Canadians were beaten up.

In 1923, the federal government passed the Chinese Immigration Act of 1923, which banned all Chinese immigration, and led to immigration restrictions for all East Asians. In 1947, the act was repealed.

According to the 1931 Canadian census, subdivisions including Richmond (East Asians formed 40 percent of the total population), Skeena Coast (37 percent), Fraser Mills (34 percent), Cumberland (32 percent), Maple Ridge (27 percent), West Vancouver Island (27 percent), Mission (24 percent), Bella Coola Coast (24 percent), Duncan (18 percent), and Pitt Meadows (17 percent) had the largest East Asian concentrations in British Columbia.

East Asian Canadian Population in British Columbia (1931 census)
Subdivision	Type		
Subdivision	Type	Population	Percentage
Vancouver	Urban	21,339	8.65%
Victoria	Urban	3,999	10.23%
Richmond	Urban	3,262	39.87%
Maple Ridge	Urban	1,351	27.39%
South Vancouver Island	Rural	1,315	8.56%
New Westminster	Urban	1,200	6.85%
Skeena Coast	Rural	955	36.96%
Mission	Urban	868	24.16%
Bella Coola Coast	Rural	865	24.11%
Upper Okanagan & Shuswap	Rural	809	9.17%
Cumberland	Urban	769	32.43%
West Vancouver Island	Rural	614	26.92%
Surrey	Urban	596	7.11%
Delta	Urban	567	15.29%
Howe Sound	Rural	529	10.96%
South East Coast Vancouver Island	Rural	523	9.81%
Nicola	Rural	475	8.26%
North Cowichan	Urban	449	13.64%
North East Coast Vancouver Island	Rural	442	6.08%
Saanich	Urban	432	3.33%
Nanaimo	Urban	420	6.49%
Prince Rupert	Urban	390	6.14%
Duncan	Urban	337	18.29%
Kamloops	Urban	329	5.33%
Kelowna	Urban	322	6.92%
North Vancouver Island	Rural	279	11.08%
Burnaby	Urban	266	1.04%
Saltspring & Islands	Rural	266	9.65%
Knight Inlet Coast	Rural	228	17.18%
Vernon	Urban	218	5.54%
Port Alberni	Urban	217	9.21%
Fraser Mills	Urban	210	34.09%
Matsqui	Rural	200	5.22%
Powell River Coast	Rural	195	3.21%
Nelson	Urban	176	2.94%
Coquitlam	Urban	175	3.59%
Upper Kootenay River	Rural	173	2.27%
Portland Canal-Nass	Rural	167	6.18%
Similkameen River	Rural	154	2.48%
Lower Fraser Valley	Rural	151	3.2%
Port Moody	Urban	155	12.3%
Cranbrook	Urban	147	4.79%
Pitt Meadows	Urban	145	17.43%
North Vancouver	Rural	126	2.63%
Chilliwack	Rural	119	2.05%
Armstrong	Urban	107	10.82%
Revelstoke	Urban	106	3.87%
Trail	Urban	102	1.35%
Upper Columbia River	Rural	93	2.34%
Kootenay & Slocan Lakes	Rural	91	0.95%
Summerland	Urban	88	4.91%
Langley	Urban	86	1.55%
West Vancouver	Urban	86	1.8%
University Endowment Area	Urban	83	14.43%
Coldstream	Urban	78	9%
Prince George	Urban	77	3.11%
Cariboo	Rural	75	3.97%
North Thompson	Rural	74	3.24%
Oak Bay	Urban	73	1.24%
Chilliwack	Urban	68	2.76%
North Columbia River	Rural	65	3.4%
Bridge-Lillooet	Rural	62	3.39%
Shuswap	Rural	62	1.36%
Penticton	Urban	60	1.29%
Spallumcheen	Urban	52	3.19%
Merritt	Urban	48	3.7%
Skeena-Bulkley	Rural	42	1.61%
North Vancouver	Urban	39	0.46%
Quesnel	Urban	39	8.74%
Kent	Urban	35	2.9%
Elk & Flathead Rivers	Rural	35	0.73%
South Columbia River	Rural	34	0.47%
Rossland	Urban	33	1.16%
Salmon Arm	Urban	33	3.98%
Kaslo	Urban	32	6.12%
Port Coquitlam	Urban	32	2.44%
Kettle River	Rural	27	0.81%
North Coast	Rural	27	8.88%
Courtenay	Urban	26	2.13%
Fernie	Urban	25	0.92%
Queen Charlotte Islands	Rural	25	2.69%
Salmon Arm	Rural	25	1.5%
Smithers	Urban	25	2.5%
Esquimalt	Urban	23	0.7%
South Chilcotin	Rural	20	8.77%
Ladysmith	Urban	18	1.25%
Kiskatinaw River	Rural	15	0.32%
Sumas	Urban	15	0.83%
Glenmore	Urban	14	4.62%
North Chilcotin	Rural	14	1.98%
Nechako-Fraser-Parsnip	Rural	12	0.46%
Abbotsford	Urban	10	1.96%
Creston	Urban	10	1.44%
East Lillooet	Rural	10	1%
Grand Forks	Urban	10	0.77%
Hope	Urban	9	2.41%
Enderby	Urban	8	1.44%
Terrace	Urban	8	2.27%
Williams Lake	Urban	8	1.99%
Alberni	Urban	7	1%
Stikine-Liard	Rural	7	2.33%
Atlin Lake	Rural	5	1.02%
Burns Lake	Urban	5	2.48%
Fraser-Canoe	Rural	5	0.21%
Vanderhoof	Urban	5	1.64%
Upper Nechako	Rural	3	0.16%
Babine-Stuart-Takla Lakes	Rural	2	0.32%
Beaton River	Rural	2	0.12%
Silverton	Urban	2	0.74%
Tadanac	Urban	2	0.43%
Greenwood	Urban	1	0.58%
British Columbia	Total	49,344	7.11%

World War II prompted the federal government used the War Measures Act to brand Japanese Canadians enemy aliens and categorized them as security threats in 1942. Tens of thousands of Japanese Canadians were placed in internment camps in British Columbia; prison of war camps in Ontario; and families were also sent as forced labourers to farms throughout the prairies. By 1943, all properties owned by Japanese Canadians in British Columbia were seized and sold without consent.

Unlike Korean Americans who have relatively much longer history settling in the United States, very few settled in Canada; as late as 1965, the total permanent Korean population of Canada was estimated at only 70. However, with the 1966 reform of Canadian immigration laws, South Korean immigration to Canada began to grow. By 1969, there were an estimated 2000 Koreans in Canada.

In the late 1990s, South Korea became the fifth-largest source of immigrants to Canada. Toronto has the country's largest absolute number of Koreans, but Vancouver is experiencing the highest rate of growth in its Korean population, with a 69% increase since 1996. Montreal was the third most popular destination for Korean migrants during this period. The 1990s growth in South Korean migration to Canada occurred at a time when Canadian unemployment was high and income growth was low relative to the United States. One pair of researchers demonstrated that numbers of migrants were correlated with the exchange rate; the weakness of the Canadian dollar relative to the United States dollar meant that South Korean migrants bringing savings to Canada for investment would be relatively richer than those going to the United States. Other factors suggested as drivers behind the growth of South Korean immigration to Canada included domestic anti-Americanism and the large presence of Canadian English teachers in local hagwon.

When Hong Kong reverted to mainland Chinese rule, people emigrated and found new homes in Canada.

== Demography ==
=== Ethnic and national origins ===
East Asian Canadians Demography by Ethnic and National Origins (2001−2021)
Ethnic/National Origins	2021		2016		2011		2006		2001	
Ethnic/National Origins	Pop.	%	Pop.	%	Pop.	%	Pop.	%	Pop.	%
Chinese	1,715,770	74.96%	1,769,195^{1}	82.39%	1,487,580^{1}	81.88%	1,346,510^{1}	82.74%	1,094,700^{1}	83.33%
Korean	218,140	9.53%	198,210	9.23%	168,890	9.3%	146,545	9%	101,715	7.74%
Japanese	129,425	5.65%	121,485	5.66%	109,740	6.04%	98,905	6.08%	85,230	6.49%
Hong Kong	81,680	3.57%	—N/a	—N/a	—N/a	—N/a	—N/a	—N/a	—N/a	—N/a
Taiwanese	64,020	2.8%	36,515	1.7%	30,330	1.67%	17,705	1.09%	18,080	1.38%
Tibetan	9,350	0.41%	8,040	0.37%	5,820	0.32%	4,275	0.26%	1,425	0.11%
Mongolian	9,090	0.4%	7,475	0.35%	5,355	0.29%	3,960	0.24%	1,675	0.13%
Other East; Asian Origins	61,300	2.68%	6,505	0.3%	9,045	0.5%	9,545	0.59%	10,805	0.82%
Total East Asian Canadian Population	2,288,775	100%	2,147,425	100%	1,816,760	100%	1,627,445	100%	1,313,630	100%
^{1}Including Hong Kong Canadians.

== Geographical distribution ==
=== Provinces and territories ===
East Asian Canadians by province and territory (2001−2016)
Province	2016		2011		2006		2001	
Province	Pop.	%	Pop.	%	Pop.	%	Pop.	%
Ontario	1,008,780	7.62%	855,280	6.76%	767,160	6.38%	614,915	5.45%
British Columbia	679,015	14.89%	586,545	13.56%	539,350	13.24%	457,555	11.83%
Alberta	232,535	5.85%	191,305	5.36%	166,105	5.1%	129,590	4.41%
Quebec	140,235	1.76%	117,580	1.52%	105,245	1.42%	74,015	1.04%
Manitoba	37,825	3.05%	29,000	2.47%	23,200	2.05%	17,550	1.59%
Saskatchewan	22,950	2.14%	17,150	1.7%	12,775	1.34%	10,815	1.12%
Nova Scotia	12,570	1.38%	9,045	1%	6,720	0.74%	4,895	0.55%
New Brunswick	6,585	0.9%	5,345	0.73%	3,960	0.55%	2,430	0.34%
Newfoundland and Labrador	2,970	0.58%	2,275	0.45%	1,930	0.39%	1,260	0.25%
Prince Edward Island	3,105	2.22%	2,385	1.74%	475	0.35%	305	0.23%
Northwest Territories	715	1.74%	620	1.52%	530	1.29%	410	1.1%
Yukon	825	2.35%	920	2.76%	650	2.15%	365	1.28%
Nunavut	150	0.42%	110	0.35%	95	0.32%	55	0.21%
Canada	2,148,230	6.23%	1,817,590	5.53%	1,628,260	5.21%	1,314,225	4.43%

== See also ==
- Chinese Canadians
  - Hong Kong Canadians
- Japanese Canadians
- Korean Canadians
- Mongolian Canadians
- Taiwanese Canadians
- Tibetan Canadians

== Bibliography ==
- Han, J. D.; Ibbott, Peter (2005), "Korean Migration to North America: Some Prices That Matter" (PDF), Canadian Studies in Population, 32 (2): 155–176, doi:10.25336/P6XS4T
- Kwak, Min-Jung (July 2004), "An Exploration of the Korean-Canadian Community in Vancouver" (PDF), Research on Immigration and Integration in the Metropolis Working Paper Series, 4 (14), archived from the original (PDF) on July 23, 2011
- Yoon, In-Jin (2006), "Understanding the Korean Diaspora from Comparative Perspectives" ( (PDF)), Transformation & Prospect toward Multiethnic, Multiracial & Multicultural Society: Enhancing Intercultural Communication, Asia Culture Forum, archived from the original on September 29, 2007
