= Jordanian Canadians =

Total population
- 13,225 (by ancestry, 2021 Census)

Regions with significant populations
- Montreal, Toronto, Vancouver, Edmonton, Quebec City, Ottawa, Sherbrooke, Calgary, Kitchener

Languages
- Canadian English · Canadian French · Jordanian Arabic

Religion
- Islam · Christianity

Jordanian Canadians are Canadian citizens of Jordanian descent or a Jordan-born person residing in Canada. According to the 2021 Census there were 13,225 Canadians who claimed Jordanian ancestry.

== Demography ==
=== Religion ===
Jordanian Canadian demography by religion
Religious group	2021 (Note: Religious breakdown proportions based on "Jordanian" ethnic or cultural origin response on the 2021 census.)	
Religious group	Pop.	%
Islam	9,500	71.83%
Christianity	2,590	19.58%
Irreligion	1,075	8.13%
Judaism	15	0.11%
Other	40	0.3%
Total Jordanian Canadian population	13,225	100%

== See also ==
- Arab Canadians
