= Paldi, British Columbia =

- Historic site
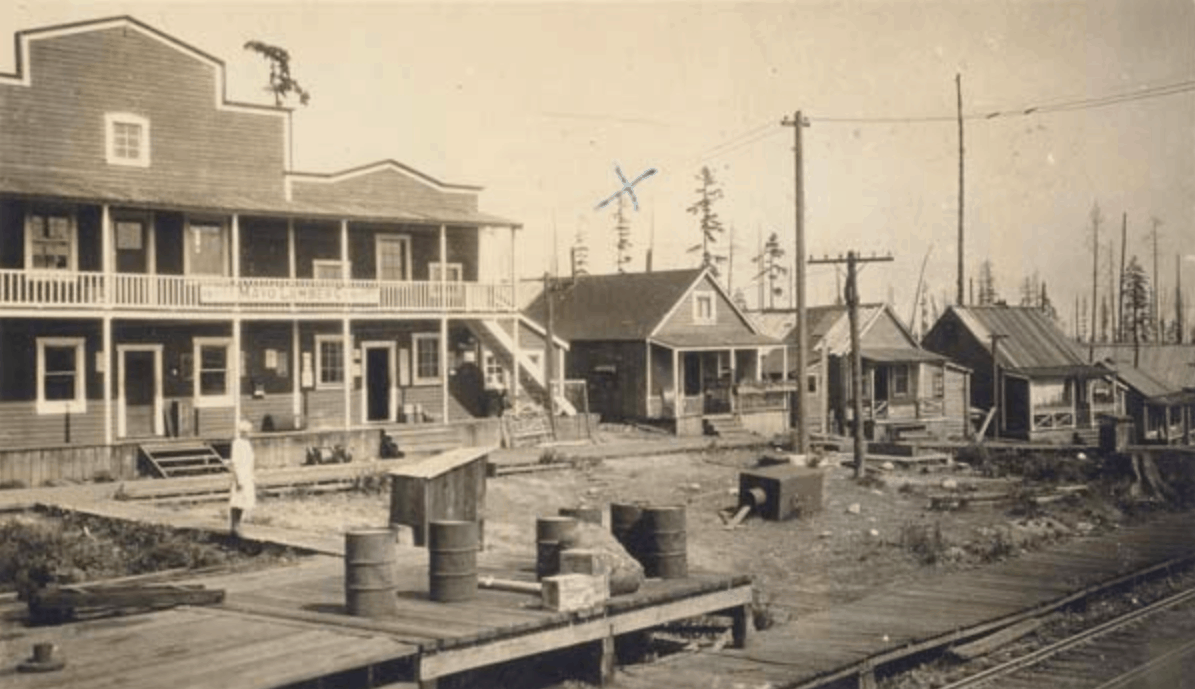

- Location of Paldi Paldi, British Columbia (Canada)
- Coordinates: 48.791°N 123.853°W
- Country: Canada
- Province: British Columbia
- Founded: 1916
- Historical town: 2016

Population
  - 1950s: 1,500 (Peak)

Paldi is a multi-ethnic settlement and former mill town near Duncan, on Vancouver Island in British Columbia. It is significant as a town founded by Sikh Canadians, and its early exemplification of multiculturalism.

== History ==
The town was founded in 1916 by Mayo Singh Manhas, his brother Ganea Singh Manhas and their cousin Doman Singh - three Sikh businessmen from Punjab. The town was originally named Mayo, but was required to change its name in 1936 due to confusion caused at the post office with Mayo, Yukon. The name was changed to Paldi, which was the name of the town in Hoshiarpur, Punjab that Doman, Ganea and Mayo had migrated from.

The town's most well-known founder, Mayo, was born Mayan Singh Manhas in 1888. He believed that having a name that would be easier for Anglo Canadians to pronounce would benefit his business prospects, so he began going by "Mayo".

By 1919, a Gurdwara was established in the community, and shortly after a school was constructed. The Gurdwara was later re-built, and has undergone subsequent renovations and updates in the decades since.

The Japanese community of Paldi built a hall which was used as a Buddhist temple and a meeting place. The wooden building was constructed next to the Gurdwara in 1923. Several forms of Buddhism were practiced by the Japanese families that used the hall. Meetings, celebrations, and occasionally United Church services also took place within its walls.

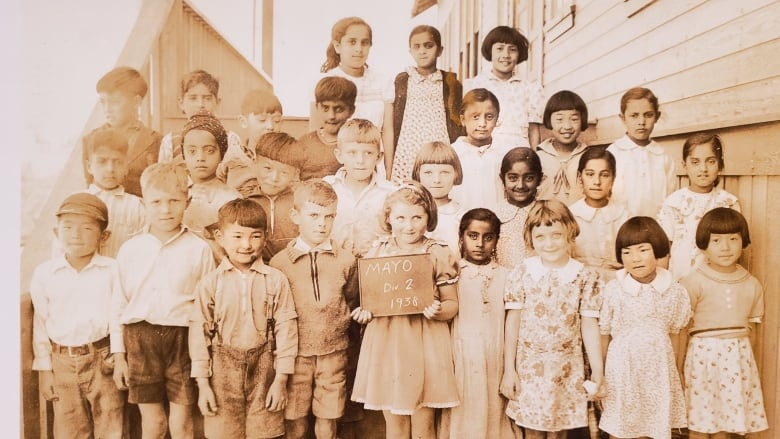
A class at Mayo School in Paldi in 1938, reflecting the diverse make-up of the community. Paldi was home to families of East Indian, Japanese, Chinese, and European descent.

The Paldi post office first opened on June 1, 1936. It was closed in 1954, only to be opened again in 1959. Finally on June 30, 1969, the post office closed permanently due to a dwindling population. The school also closed in 1969, and the remaining children were bussed to nearby Lake Cowichan. At its peak, Paldi had a population of over 1,500 people. The settlement was a mixing pot where East Indian, Japanese, Chinese, and European cultures were celebrated.

India's first Prime Minister, Jawaharlal Nehru visited Paldi on a trip to British Columbia in November 1949. He was accompanied by his daughter, Indira Gandhi, who also later became prime minister. The visit was in part due to Mayo Singh gaining a far reaching reputation of making large charitable donations to both Canadian and Indian organizations.

Herb, Ted, and Gordon Singh, sons of Doman Singh, went on to found the Doman Lumber Company, which became Doman Industries. The company, based in nearby Duncan, continued to grow and operated for decades on Vancouver Island.

== Present day ==
Most of the original families left for better job prospects in the surrounding Cowichan Valley, as well as the Nanaimo area. By 1975, the Japanese, European and Chinese families had all left the area. The last few East Indian families remained in Paldi until about 1980, leaving behind the Gurdwara and about 15 houses. The remainder of the homes were razed in 2005, leaving just the Gurdwara standing. Gurdwaras were built in neighbouring communities of Lake Cowichan in 1969, and Duncan in 1985 - decreasing attendance at the Paldi temple.

Two books have been written on the history of the former community. Joan Mayo, daughter-in-law of Mayo Singh, wrote Paldi Remembered in 1997. The book is a collection of stories and pictures that gives tribute to the once bustling lumber mill town. In 2002, Archana B. Verma wrote The Making of Little Punjab in Canada, a study of the Sikhs living in Paldi.

The Paldi Gurdwara was brought to national attention in 2012, after it was under a court-ordered sale order for developers to build over the former Paldi town site. The construction plans were opposed by the Sikh community who advocated for the temple to be given protected status. In order to protect the site from development, the Paldi Gurdwara was designated a Historic Site by the Cowichan Valley Regional District in 2014. In 2016, the government of British Columbia also designated the temple as a site of cultural importance due to the advocacy efforts of former Attorney General, Wally Oppal.

The Cowichan Valley Trail, part of the Trans Canada Trail was completed in 2017. The trail goes through Paldi on the route of a former railway.

== See also ==
- Indo-Canadians in British Columbia
- Sikhism in Canada
