= Armenian Canadians =

Canadians of Armenian ancestry

Total population
- 68,855 (2021 census); 0.18% of Canada's population 80,000—100,000 (estimates)

Regions with significant populations
- Greater Montreal · Greater Toronto

Languages
- Armenian · Canadian English · Canadian French

Religion
- Christianity (predominantly Armenian Apostolic with Armenian Catholic and Evangelical minorities)

Armenian Canadians (Western Armenian: գանատահայեր, Eastern Armenian: կանադահայեր, kanadahayer; French: Arméno-Canadiens) are citizens and permanent residents of Canada who have total or partial Armenian ancestry. According to the 2021 Canadian Census they number almost 69,000, while independent estimates claim around 80,000 Canadians of Armenian origin, with the highest estimates reaching 100,000. Though significantly smaller than the Armenian American community, the formation of both underwent similar stages beginning in the late 19th century and gradually expanding in the latter 20th century and beyond. Most Armenian Canadians are descendants of Armenian genocide survivors from the Middle East (Syria, Lebanon, Egypt), with less than 7% of all Canadian Armenians having been born in Armenia. Today most Armenian Canadians live in Greater Montreal and Greater Toronto, where they have established churches, schools and community centers.

== History ==
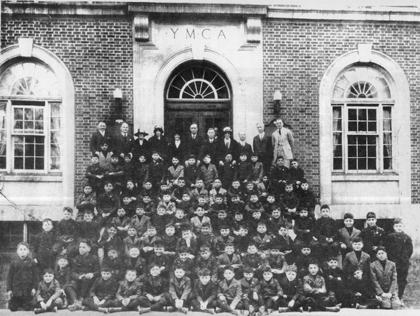
A group of the Georgetown Boys

The first Armenians migrated to Canada in the 1880s. The first recorded Armenian to settle in Canada was a man named Garabed Nergarian, who came to Port Hope, Ontario in 1887. Some 37 Armenians settled in Canada in 1892 and 100 in 1895. Most early Armenian migrants to Canada were men who were seeking employment. After the Hamidian massacres of mid-1890s Armenian families from the Ottoman Empire began settling in Canada. Before the Armenian genocide of 1915 some 1,800 Armenians already lived in Canada. They were overwhelmingly from the Armenian provinces of the Ottoman Empire and usually lived in industrial urban areas. The influx of Armenians to Canada was limited in the post-World War I era because Armenians were classified as Asians. Nevertheless, some 1,500 genocide survivors—mostly women and children—came to Canada as refugees. In 1923–24 some 100 Armenians orphans aged 8–12, later known as The Georgetown Boys, were brought to Canada from Corfu, Greece by the Armenian Canadian Relief Fund to Georgetown, Ontario. Dubbed "The Noble Experiment", it was Canada's first humanitarian act on an international scale. The Georgetown Farmhouse (now the Cedarvale Community Centre) was designated historic and protected municipal site in 2010.

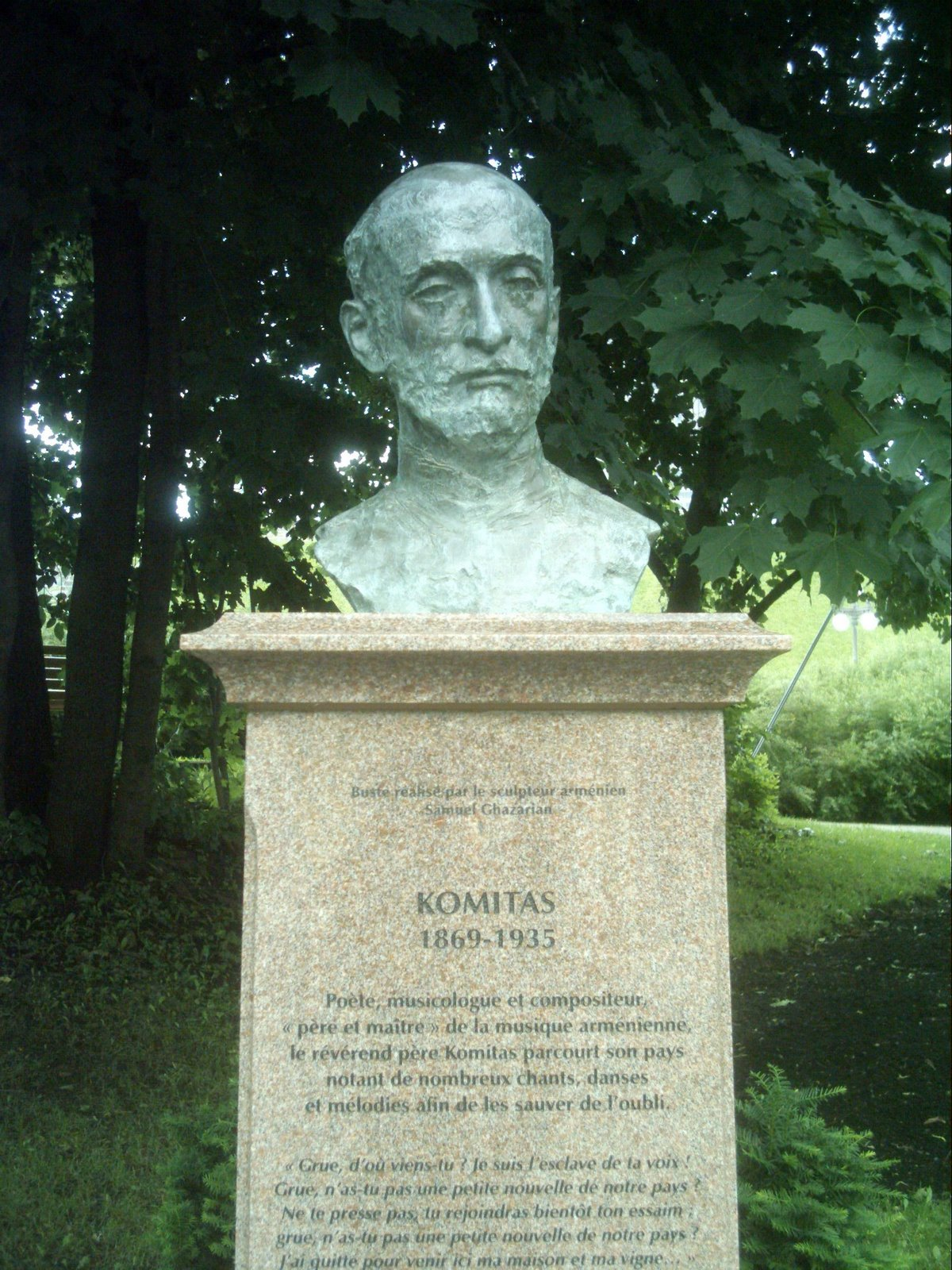
A bust of Komitas in Quebec City, unveiled in 2008.

Overall, between 1900 and 1930 some 3,100 Armenians entered Canada, with 75% settling in Ontario and 20% in Quebec. Some later moved to the United States; 1,577 Armenians entered the U.S. from Canada between 1899 and 1917. Between 1931 and 1949 only 74 Armenians migrated to Canada. By the 1940s the community was still no larger than 4,000. The two early centers of the Armenian community was in Brantford and St. Catharines, Ontario, with each having 500 Armenians in the 1920s. The first Armenian church was established in St. Catharines in 1930, becoming the hub of Armenians in Canada.

Immigration laws were loosened in the post-World War II era. Through the efforts of the Canadian Armenian Congress thousands of Armenians were allowed in. In the 1960s some 5,000 Armenians settled in Canada and by the 1970s Canada already boasted an Armenian population of 30,000. Most Armenians came from the Middle East (Syria, Lebanon, Egypt, Turkey) and Greece. Migrants from Soviet Armenia were also increasingly moving to Canada. The Armenian Soviet Encyclopedia entry on Armenians (1980) by Suren Eremian estimated some 50,000 Armenians in Canada. The same number was given by Hrag Vartanian, writing for the AGBU Magazine in 2000.

In the 2010s thousands of Syrian Armenian families fleeing the war there settled in Canada. By December 2015 the Armenian Community Centre, a government-sanctioned sponsorship agency, and individual Canadian Armenians co-sponsored around 2,500 Syrian Armenians. The Diocese of the Armenian Church of Canada sponsored some 1,000 Syrian Armenian refugees by 2016.

== Demography ==
=== Population ===
Canadians of Armenian ancestry (total responses)
Year	Number
1996	37,500
2001	40,505
2006	50,500
2011	55,740
2016	63,810
2021	68,855

Armenian ancestry in Canada
Year	Total responses	Single responses	Multiple responses
1996	37,500	25,805	11,690
2001	40,505	27,175	13,330
2006	50,500	32,530	17,970
2011	55,740	31,075	24,675
2016	63,810	34,560	29,250
2021	68,855	38,010	30,835

According to 2016 Canadian Census, 63,810 people of Armenian ancestry reside in Canada, of which 34,560 claimed only Armenian ancestry, while 29,250 people indicated Armenian as one of their multiple ancestries. The number of Canadian Armenians stood at 37,500 in 1996, when the number of Armenians were first reported in Canadian censuses. In two decades, from 1996 to 2016, the number of Canadian Armenians grew 1.7 times.

According to the 2006 census, most Canadian Armenians were Canadian citizens (45,960 vs 4,535 not Canadian citizens). Of 50,500 Armenians in Canada at the time, 19,910 were classified as non-immigrants, while 30,055 were immigrants, mostly from West Central Asia and the Middle East (22,300), Northern Africa (3,755) and Eastern Europe (1,460). In 2006 Armenia-born Canadians numbered 2,195. It grew to 4,165 by 2016, 72% of whom had migrated to Canada between 2001 and 2016.

Unofficial estimates put the number of Canadian Armenians significantly higher than census results. The 2003 Encyclopedia of the Armenian Diaspora estimated 60,000–65,000 Armenians in Canada, while the 2001 census had found 40,505 Canadians of Armenian ancestry. The Embassy of Armenia to Canada reported some 81,500 Armenians in Canada in 2009. Estimates in the 2010s usually ranged from 80,000 to 100,000.

=== Language ===
Armenian speakers in Canada
Year	"Language spoken most often at home"	"Mother tongue"
1991	20,515 (Note: "home language")	30,630 (Note: "knowledge of non-official languages")
2001	26,215	—
2006	21,480	—
2011	19,145	31,680
2016	21,510	35,790

The 2016 census enumerated 35,790 Canadians who consider Armenian their mother tongue, but only 21,510 Canadians claimed Armenian to be the "language spoken most often at home". In the 2006 census 21,480 Canadians had indicated Armenian as the "language spoken most often at home", of whom 4,915 had non-immigrant status, while 16,320 were immigrants.

In the 2006 census, of the 50,500 Canadian Armenians, 10,250 indicated English as their mother tongue, while 3,995 indicated French. Majority (34,345) indicated a non-official language as their mother tongue. Most Canadian Armenians claimed to speak either both official languages (English and French: 23,785) or English only (21,965), while a minority speaks only French (2,700). Some 2,045 Canadian Armenians speak neither English nor French.

Most Armenian-speakers in Canada speak Western Armenian, while a minority speaks Eastern Armenian.

=== Religion ===
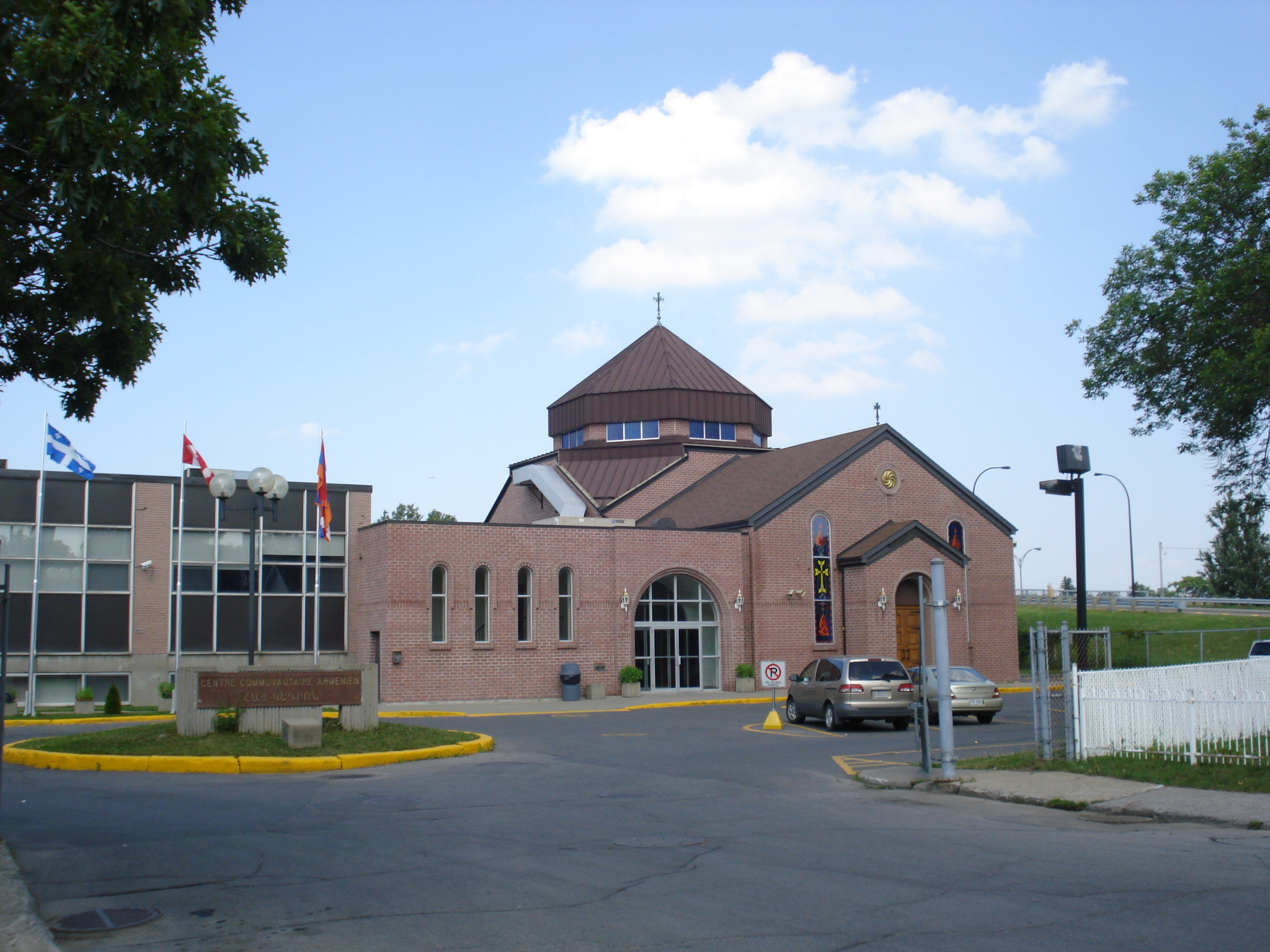
St. Hagop (Saint-Jacques) Armenian Apostolic Cathedral in Montreal, affiliated with the Cilicia See.

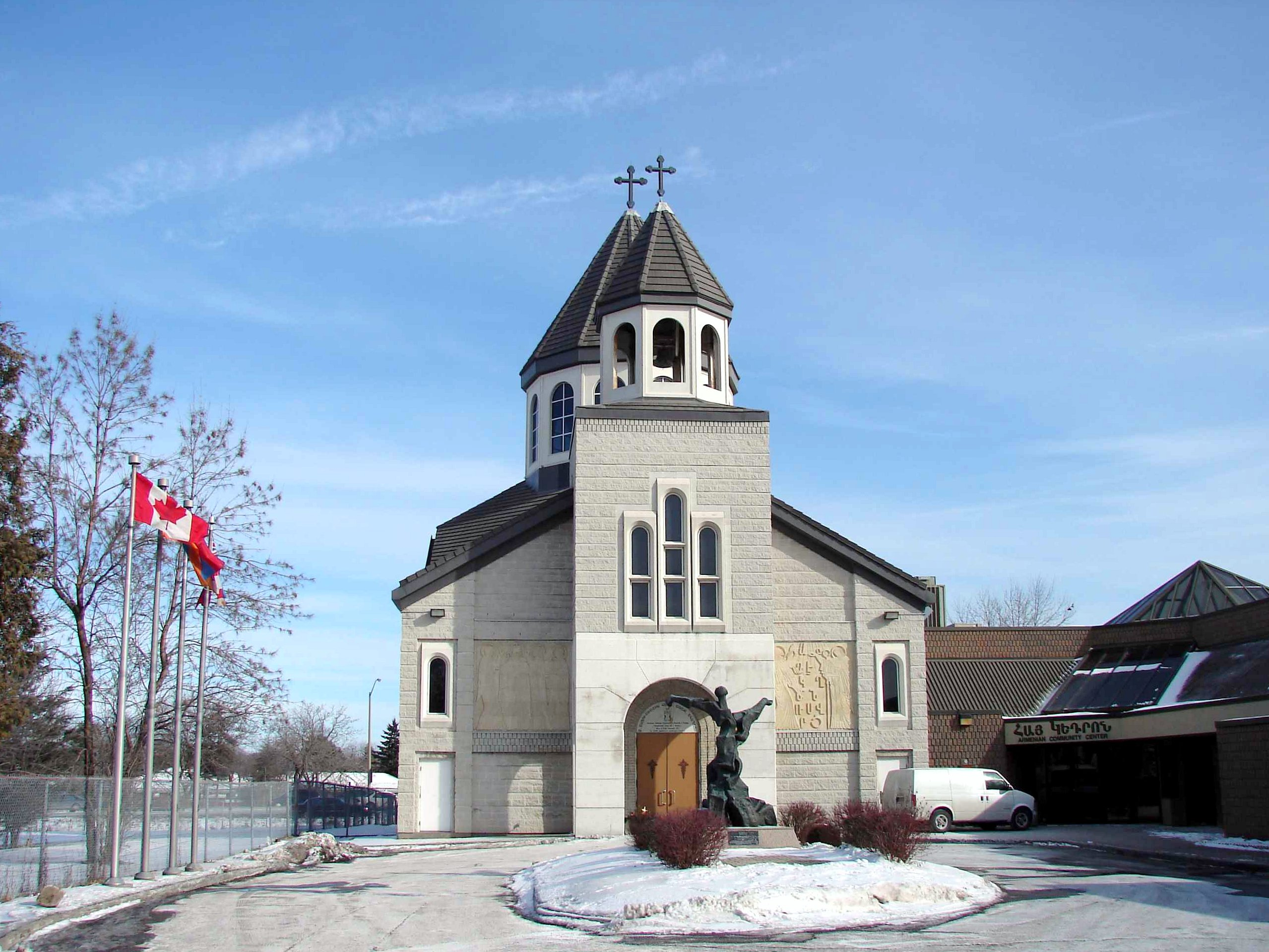
St. Mary Armenian Apostolic Church, Toronto.

Most Armenian Canadians belong to the Armenian Apostolic Church. Its parishes are affiliated with either the Mother See of Holy Etchmiadzin (under the Armenian Diocese of Canada) or the Holy See of Cilicia (Armenian Prelacy of Canada). The Armenian Diocese of Canada was established in 1983 during the reign of Catholios Vazgen I. It broke off from the New York City-based Eastern Diocese of America. The Armenian Prelacy of Canada was founded in 2002, breaking off from the Armenian Prelacy of Eastern America, which in turn had split from the Armenian Prelacy of America, originally established in 1958, during the height of the Etchmiadzin-Cilicia tensions. The Armenian Diocese and Prelacy have 20 churches in total. Ontario contains half (10), followed by Quebec (4), British Columbia (2), Alberta (2), Manitoba (1) and Northwest Territories (1). The Etchmiadzin-affiliated Armenian Diocese of Canada has 12 churches, while the Cilicia-affiliated Prelacy has 8. The cathedrals of both are located in Montreal.

A minority of Armenian Canadians are Protestant and Catholic. The Armenian Catholic Church has two churches: Notre Dame de Nareg in Saint-Laurent (Montreal, 1983) and St. Gregory the Illuminator in Toronto (1993). The two churches operate under the Armenian Catholic Eparchy of Our Lady of Nareg in the United States of America and Canada. Up to 10,000 Catholic Armenians reside in Canada, with the largest community in Montreal.

There are four Armenian Protestant churches in Canada, two in Montreal and one in Toronto and Cambridge. One in Montreal and the church in Toronto are affiliated with the Armenian Evangelical Church, while the other two are affiliated with the United Church of Canada, but are "autonomous and have services in the Armenian vernacular language."

Armenian Canadian demography by religion
Religious group	2021 (Note: Religious breakdown proportions based on "Armenian" ethnic or cultural origin response on the 2021 census.)		2001 (Note: Religious breakdown proportions based on "Armenian" ethnic or cultural origin response on the 2001 census.)	
Religious group	Pop.	%	Pop.	%
Christianity	56,290	81.76%	37,675	93.02%
Islam	710	1.03%	220	0.54%
Irreligion	11,145	16.19%	2,405	5.94%
Judaism	430	0.62%	100	0.25%
Buddhism	65	0.09%	35	0.09%
Hinduism	20	0.03%	45	0.11%
Indigenous spirituality	25	0.04%	130	0.32%
Sikhism	0	0%	0	0%
Other	185	0.27%	20	0.05%
Total Armenian Canadian population	68,850	100%	40,500	100%

Armenian Canadian demography by Christian sects
Religious group	2021		2001	
Religious group	Pop.	%	Pop.	%
Catholic	11,975	21.27%	7710	20.46%
Orthodox	22,075	39.22%	20,260	53.78%
Protestant	4,900	8.7%	3,745	9.94%
Other Christian	17,340	30.8%	5,960	15.82%
Total Armenian canadian christian population	56,290	100%	37,675	100%

== Geographic distribution ==
According to the 2016 census, almost 90% of Canadian Armenians reside in Canada's two largest provinces: Ontario and Quebec. Smaller number of Armenians live in British Columbia and Alberta. Armenian communities in other provinces and territories number less than 1,000. According to the 2016 census, the number of Canadian Armenians by provinces, territories and census divisions was as follows:

Province	Armenians	Census divisions with largest Armenian populations
Ontario	29,675	Toronto: 12,270; York: 5,820; Peel: 2,120; Ottawa: 1,470; Waterloo: 1,270; Halton: 1,085; Durham: 1,055
Quebec	27,380	Montreal: 13,185; Laval: 10,370; Longueuil: 1,025
British Columbia	3,720	Greater Vancouver: 2,845
Alberta	1,780	Division No. 6 (Calgary): 1,020
Rest of Canada	1,255	

Other provinces and territories had significantly less Armenians: Manitoba (500), Nova Scotia (270), Saskatchewan (240), New Brunswick (110), Newfoundland and Labrador (55), Northwest Territories (30), Prince Edward Island (30), Yukon (25), Nunavut (0).

According to the 2016 census, the largest number of Armenians reside in the following census metropolitan areas and census agglomerations: Montreal (26,100), Toronto (21,710), Vancouver (2,845), Ottawa–Gatineau (1,735), Hamilton (1,360), Kitchener – Cambridge – Waterloo (1,270), Calgary (1,010), St. Catharines – Niagara (920), Edmonton (620), Windsor (570).

The highest concentration of Armenian Canadians of any major settlement is in Laval (part of Greater Montreal), where Armenians are the 9th largest ethnicity and comprise around 2.5% of the total population.

== Organizations ==
A number of Armenian organizations have branches in Canada, including the non-partisan and secular Armenian General Benevolent Union (AGBU), which has two chapters in Montreal (founded in 1957) and Toronto. Other Armenian organizations with established presence in Canada are the Armenian Relief Society with ten chapters, the Hamazkayin Armenian Educational and Cultural Society (two chapters, 5 units), and Homenetmen (six chapters and units). Armenia Fund also has two branches (in Montreal and Toronto).

The Zoryan Institute of Canada, a center for contemporary Armenian research and documentation, was established in 1984.

The three traditional parties of the Armenian diaspora are present in Canada. The nationalist Armenian Revolutionary Federation (ARF, Dashnaktsutiun) is by far the largest and most influential with nine chapters. Its active circles include the young wing (Armenian Youth Federation, AYF) and the Armenian National Committee of Canada (ANCC), established in 1965 with the mission to advance the "concerns of the Armenian Canadian community on a broad range of issues", including fostering "public awareness in support of a free, united and independent Armenia." The current spokesperson of the ARF Bureau, Hagop Der-Khatchatourian, is from Montreal. The conservative Ramgavar and social democratic Hunchak parties have branches in Montreal and Toronto.

=== Armenian schools ===
The first Armenian school in Canada was established in St. Catharines in 1919. The first day government-sponsored Armenian schools were established in the 1970s. The first school Armén-Québec Alex Manoogian School in Montreal in 1970. As of 2003, six Armenian schools operated in Canada. They include five elementary schools (three in Montreal, two in Toronto) one high school in Montreal (École Arménienne Sourp Hagop), and one high school in Toronto (A.R.S. Armenian School).

== Armenian genocide recognition and commemoration ==
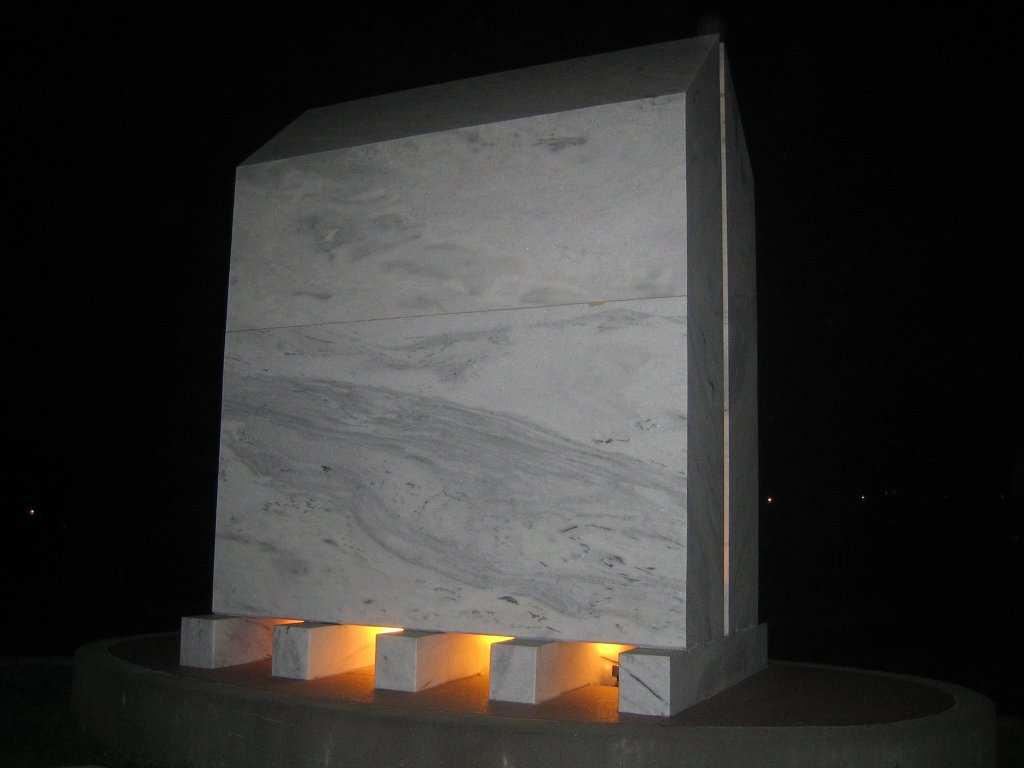
The Armenian Genocide Memorial in Montreal, by artist Francine Larrivée

In 1996 and 2002 Canadian Prime Minister Jean Chrétien released statements on the "Armenian tragedy of 1915" and the "calamity suffered by the Armenian community."

In 2002 the Senate of Canada passed a resolution (39–1) sponsored by Shirley Maheu that called upon the Government of Canada to "recognize the genocide of the Armenians and to condemn any attempt to deny or distort a historical truth as being anything less than genocide, a crime against humanity, and to designate April 24th of every year hereafter throughout Canada as a day of remembrance of the 1.5 million Armenians who fell victim to the first genocide of the twentieth century."

However, it was not until April 21, 2004, when Canada officially recognized the Armenian genocide. On that day the House of Commons adopted a "strongly worded" resolution which stated: "That this House acknowledges the Armenian genocide of 1915 and condemns this act as a crime against humanity." It passed with 153 votes in favor, 68 against. The motion was opposed by the Liberal cabinet of Prime Minister Paul Martin, who was absent during the vote, however, most Liberal backbenchers voted in favor of the Bloc Québécois motion, while cabinet members rejected it.

Since 2006, Prime Minister Stephen Harper released annual statements explicitly referring to the Armenian genocide. The tradition has been continued by his successor, Justin Trudeau.

On April 24, 2015, on the 100th anniversary of the Armenian genocide, the House of Commons of Canada unanimously passed a resolution that designated the month of April as Genocide Remembrance, Condemnation and Prevention Month and April 24 as Armenian Genocide Memorial Day. The parliament also reaffirmed its support for the Armenian genocide recognition resolution adopted on April 21, 2004.

According to the Armenian National Institute there are six Armenian genocide memorials in Canada, including two in Toronto, one in Montreal, St. Catharines, Markham, and Cambridge.

== Prominent Armenian Canadians ==
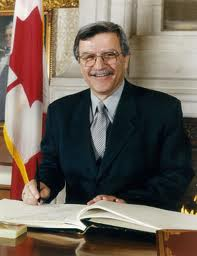
Sarkis Assadourian

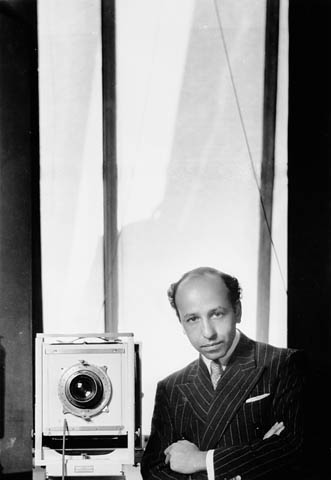
Yousuf Karsh

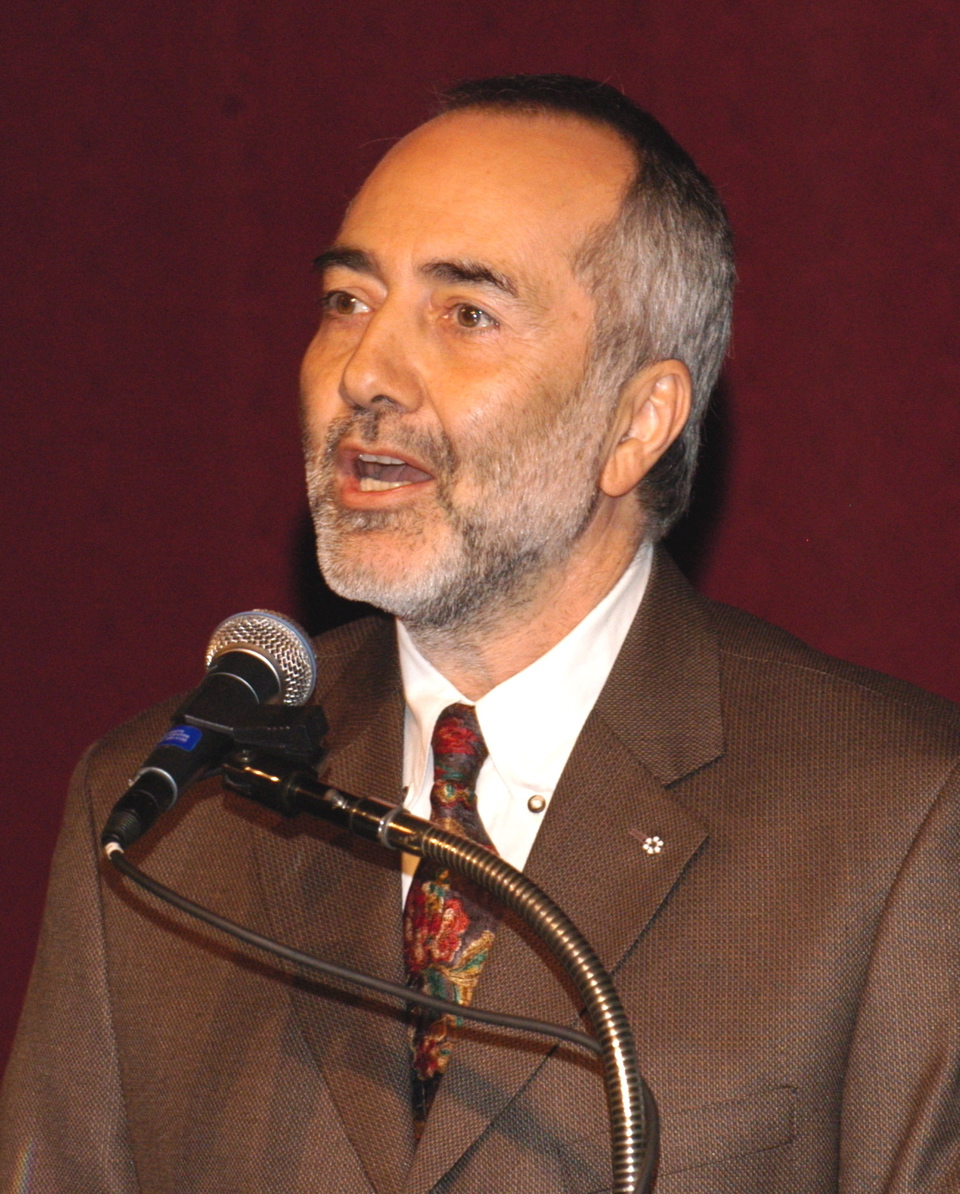
Raffi

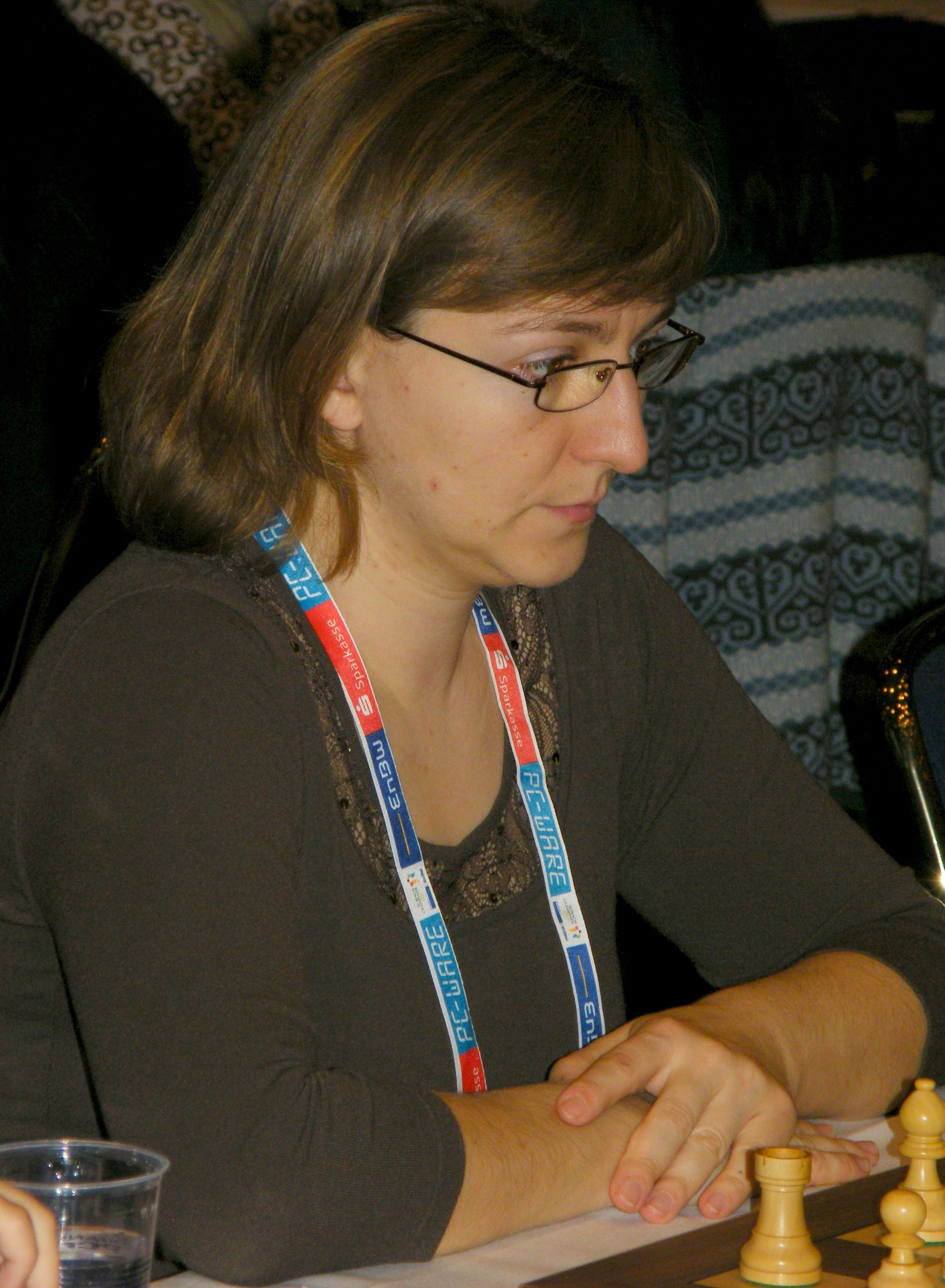
Natalia Khoudgarian

Armenian Canadians have risen to prominence in many fields.

=== Politics ===
Two Armenian Canadians have been Members of Parliament: Syria-born Sarkis Assadourian in 1993–2004 and André Arthur in 2006–2011. Raymond Setlakwe was Senator in 2000–2003. Egypt-born Ann Cavoukian was Information and Privacy Commissioner of Ontario for three terms in 1997–2014. Aris Babikian was elected to the Legislative Assembly of Ontario in 2018. The Montreal City Council has had several Armenian members: Aleppo-born Noushig Eloyan in 1994–2009; Lebanese-born Harout Chitilian in 2009–2017; Lebanese-born Hasmig Belleli (Vasilian), Jack Chadirdjian in 1994–1998, Mary Deros (since 1998).

=== Arts ===
Ottoman-born Yousuf Karsh, who was based in Ottawa, is considered the leading portrait photographer of the 20th century. Egypt-born film director Atom Egoyan has been described as "the most accomplished Canadian director of his generation." His wife Arsinée Khanjian is a Beirut-born actress. Raffi (Cavoukian), a singer known for his children's music, was called "by far the most popular artist in the burgeoning children's music market" in 1988. Andrea Martin, born to Armenian parents in the US, is a celebrity comedian and actress. Peter Oundjian was the music director of the Toronto Symphony Orchestra in 2004–2018. Egypt-born Raffi Armenian was the director of the Conservatoire de musique du Québec à Montréal between 2008 and 2011. Lebanese-born operatic soprano Isabel Bayrakdarian has earned acclaim for her Mozart roles. Syrian-born Hrag Vartanian is the co-founder and editor of Hyperallergic, an online arts magazine.

=== Academia ===
Ottoman-born medical scientist John Basmajian was Head of the Department of Anatomy at Queen's University. His work in electromyography "resulted in significant progress in rehabilitative science." Istanbul-born Agop Jack Hacikyan and Beirut-born Razmik Panossian are known for their work in Armenian studies. Armine Yalnizyan is a prominent progressive economist.

=== Other ===
Ottoman-born Aris Alexanian was one of Canada's leading rug importers between 1920s and 1960s. Bulgarian-born Alice Panikian was crowned Miss Universe Canada in 2006 and was in top 10 of Miss Universe 2006. Russian-born Natalia Khoudgarian is a four-time Canadian Women's Chess Champion (2006, 2007, 2011, 2012). Anita Sarkeesian, a feminist media critic, was at the center of the Gamergate controversy.

== See also ==
- Armenia–Canada relations
- List of Armenian Canadians
- Middle Eastern Canadians
- West Asian Canadians
- Armenian diaspora
- Armenian Americans
- Armenians in France
