= Cavoukian =

Cavoukian is an Armenian surname. Notable people with the surname include:

- Ann Cavoukian (born 1952), former Information and Privacy Commissioner for the Canadian province of Ontario
- Onnig Cavoukian (born 1945), Canadian-Armenian photographer
- Raffi Cavoukian, known by the mononym Raffi (born 1948), Canadian singer-lyricist and author of Armenian descent born in Egypt, best known for his children's music
