= West Asian Canadians =

- West Central Asian and Middle Eastern Canadians as percent of population by province/territory

Total population
- 1,011,145; 2.9% of the total Canadian population (2016)

Regions with significant populations
- Toronto, Richmond Hill, Vaughan, Vancouver, Coquitlam

Languages
- Canadian English · Canadian French ·; Persian · Assyrian languages: Suret & Turoyo · Armenian · Kurdish · Turkish · Pashto · Dari · Hebrew · Georgian · Azerbaijani · Tajik · Turkmen · Uzbek · Hazaragi · Aimaq · Balochi · Neo-Aramaic · Mazanderani · Other West Asian languages

Religion
- Islam (53%); Eastern Orthodoxy (11%); Mainline Protestantism (9%); Catholicism (8%); Irreligion (6%); others (13%)

Related ethnic groups
- Middle Eastern Canadians · Arab Canadians · Asian Canadians

West Asian Canadians, officially known as West Central Asian and Middle Eastern Canadians are Canadians who were either born in or can trace their ancestry to West Asia and Central Asia. The term West Asian Canadian is a subgroup of Asian Canadians and Middle Eastern Canadians. According to Statistics Canada, West Asian Canadians are considered visible minorities and can be further divided by nationality, such as Lebanese Canadian or Iranian Canadian.

As of 2016, 1,011,145 Canadians had West and Central Asian geographical origins, constituting 2.9% of the Canadian population and 16.6% of Canada's Asian Canadian population.

== Terminology ==
In the Canadian census, people with geographical origins or ancestry in West Asia (e.g. Arab Canadians, Armenian Canadians, Kurdish Canadians, Iranian Canadians, Turkish Canadians) and Central Asia (e.g. Afghan Canadians, Kazakh Canadians, Uzbek Canadians) are classified as West Asian, officially as West Central Asian and Middle Eastern.

== History ==
West & Central Asian Canadian; Population History
Year	Pop.	±%
2001	483,415	—
2006	652,645	+35.0%
2011	778,465	+19.3%
2016	1,011,150	+29.9%
Source: Statistics Canada

=== 19th century ===
People from what are now Lebanon and Syria started immigrating to Canada during the late 19th century; the Ottoman province of Syria at that time covered the entire Levant, so they were called either Turks or "Syrian−Lebanese" on census reports. Settling in the Montreal area of southern Quebec, they became the first West Asian group to immigrate to Canada. The first Lebanese immigrant to Canada was Abraham Bounadere (Ibrahim Abu Nadir) from Zahlé in Lebanon who settled in Montreal in 1882. Because of situations within Lebanon and restrictive Canadian laws these immigrants were 90% Christian. These immigrants were mostly economic migrants seeking greater prosperity in the New World.

Similar to late 19th century through early 20th century Lebanese immigration and settler patterns, while the vast majority of Syrians migrated to South America, a small percentage made their way to the United States, and an even smaller percentage settled in Canada. Once again, in a similar demographic to early Lebanese settlers to Canada, the overwhelming majority of Syrians who settled in Canada from the 1880s–1960s were of the Christian faith. The so-called Shepard of the lost flock, Saint Raphael Hawaweeny of Brooklyn, New York, came to Montreal in 1896 to help establish a Christian association called the Syrian Benevolent Society and then later on an Orthodox church in Montreal for the newly arrived Syrian faithful.

West Asian settlement into Canada was also bolstered by early Armenian immigration during the late 19th century. The first Armenians migrated to Canada in the 1880s. The first recorded Armenian to settle in Canada was a man named Garabed Nergarian, who came to Port Hope, Ontario in 1887. Some 37 Armenians settled in Canada in 1892 and 100 in 1895. Most early Armenian migrants to Canada were men who were seeking employment. After the Hamidian massacres of mid-1890s Armenian families from the Ottoman Empire began settling in Canada.

=== 20th century ===
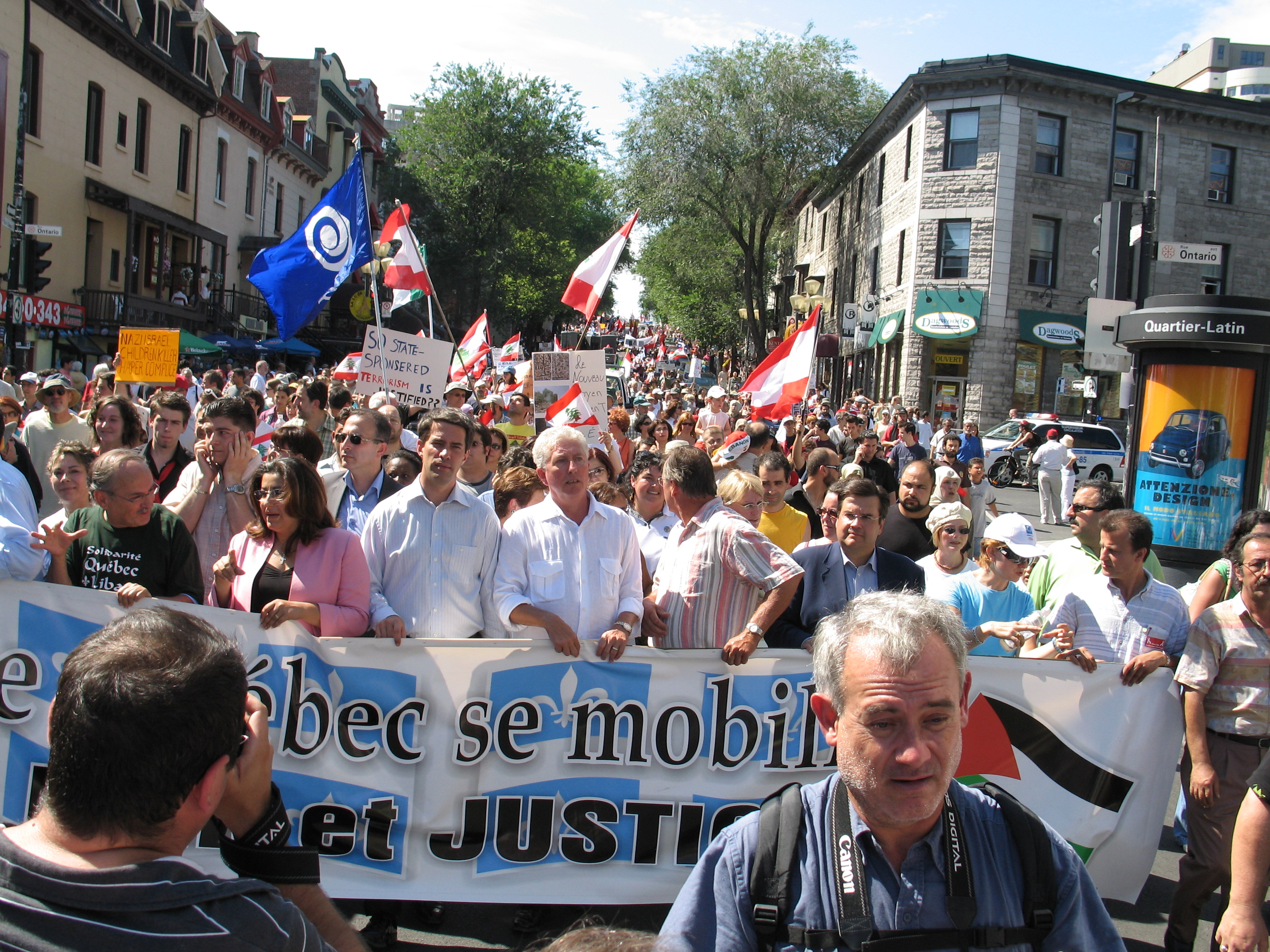
More than 15,000 Lebanese Canadians took part in a demonstration in Montreal.

In 1901, Canada had between 300–400 Muslim residents, equally divided between Turks and Syrian Arabs. Furthermore, the turn of the 20th century featured a small wave of Syrian−Lebanese settlement into the southern prairies including Alberta, Saskatchewan, and Manitoba. Contemporarily in Lebanon, many families were from what was western Syria at the time in particular settled in southern Saskatchewan. A majority of the Syrian−Lebanese families settling in the prairies were of the Christian faith, with a minority adhering to Islam, mirroring earlier settler demographics in Nova Scotia, Quebec and Ontario. Prominent settlement occurred in communities such as Swift Current, Saskatchewan, and Lac La Biche, Alberta. Few reached the Northwest Territories, the best known being Peter Baker, author of the book An Arctic Arab, and later elected as a member of the legislative assembly of the Northwest Territories.

During the pre-World War I period, Turks were to be found in mining and logging camps across Canada. However, due to bad relations between the Ottoman Empire and the Allies, further migration was made difficult for the Turks and the Canadian government discouraged "Asian" immigration. With the Canadian Immigration Act of 1910, Turkish immigration to the Canada was banned. With the onset of World War I, Turkish Canadians were placed in "enemy alien" internment camps. Five days after the war began, on 10 November 1914, 98 Turks were deported and settled in Kingston and then in Kapuskasing. Their number increased over time. They were not the only "enemy aliens" subjected to internment. More than 8,500 people were placed in 24 camps during the war. Of them, 205 were Turks.

Before the Armenian genocide of 1915 some 1,800 Armenians already lived in Canada. They were overwhelmingly from the Armenian provinces of the Ottoman Empire and usually lived in industrial urban areas. The influx of Armenians to Canada was limited in the post-World War I era because Armenians were classified as Asians. Nevertheless, some 1,500 genocide survivors—mostly women and children—came to Canada as refugees. In 1923–1924, some 100 Armenians orphans aged 8–12, later known as the Georgetown Boys, were brought to Canada from Corfu, Greece by the Armenian Canadian Relief Fund to Georgetown, Ontario. Dubbed "The Noble Experiment", it was Canada's first humanitarian act on an international scale. The Georgetown Farmhouse (now the Cedarvale Community Centre) was designated historic and protected municipal site in 2010. Overall, between 1900 and 1930 some 3,100 Armenians entered Canada, with 75% settling in Ontario and 20% in Quebec. Some later moved to the United States; 1,577 Armenians entered the U.S. from Canada between 1899 and 1917.

The Iranian Revolution of 1979 resulted in a spike of immigration to Canada from the West Asian country. In the aftermath, many Iranian Canadians began to categorize themselves as "Persian" rather than "Iranian", mainly to dissociate themselves from the Islamic regime of Iran and the negativity associated with it, and also to distinguish themselves as being of Persian ethnicity.

== Demography ==
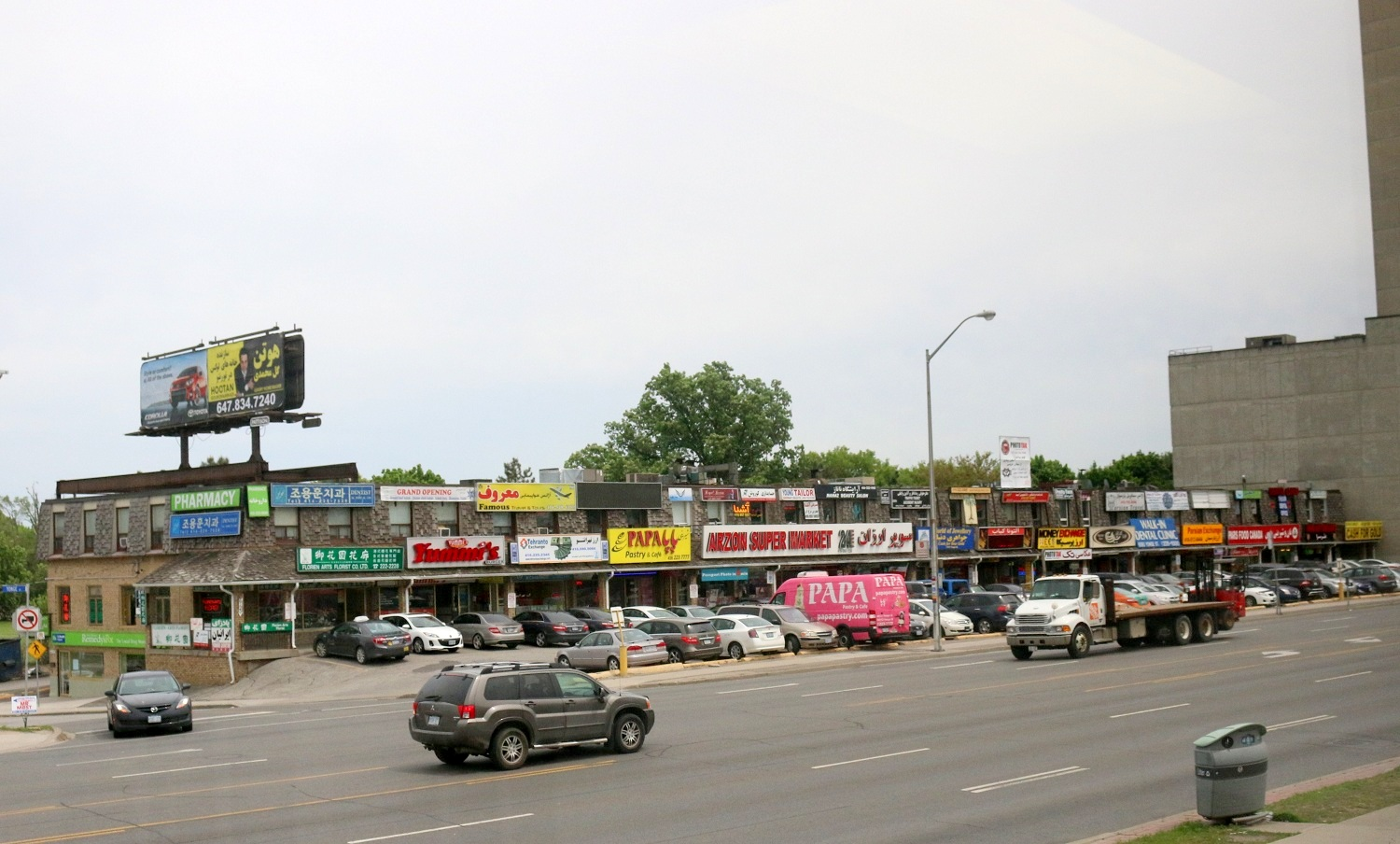
Storefronts in North York offering Iranian cuisine. North York holds the largest population of West Asians in Toronto.

=== Ethnic and national origins ===
West and Central Asian Canadians Demography by Ethnic and National Origins (2001−2016)
Ethnic/national Origin	2016		2011		2006		2001	
Ethnic/national Origin	Pop.	%	Pop.	%	Pop.	%	Pop.	%
(Lebanon) Lebanese	219,555	21.71%	190,275	24.44%	165,150	25.3%	143,635	29.71%
(Iran) Iranian	210,405	20.81%	163,290	20.98%	121,505	18.62%	88,220	18.25%
(Afghanistan) Afghan	83,995	8.31%	62,815	8.07%	48,090	7.37%	25,230	5.22%
(Syria) Syrian	77,045	7.62%	40,840	5.25%	31,370	4.81%	22,065	4.56%
(Iraq) Iraqi	70,920	7.01%	49,680	6.38%	29,950	4.59%	19,245	3.98%
(Turkey) Turkish	63,955	6.32%	55,430	7.12%	43,700	6.7%	24,910	5.15%
(Armenia) Armenian	63,810	6.31%	55,740	7.16%	50,500	7.74%	40,505	8.38%
(Palestine) Palestinian	44,820	4.43%	31,245	4.01%	23,975	3.67%	14,675	3.04%
(Israel) Israeli	28,735	2.84%	15,010	1.93%	10,755	1.65%	6,060	1.25%
(Kurdistan Region) Kurdish	16,315	1.61%	11,685	1.5%	9,205	1.41%	5,680	1.17%
(Jordan) Jordanian	14,250	1.41%	9,425	1.21%	6,905	1.06%	3,760	0.78%
Assyrian	13,830	1.37%	10,810	1.39%	8,650	1.33%	6,980	1.44%
(Saudi Arabia) Saudi Arabian	6,810	0.67%	7,955	1.02%	2,730	0.42%	1,080	0.22%
(Yemen) Yemeni	6,645	0.66%	3,945	0.51%	2,300	0.35%	1,445	0.3%
(Azerbaijan) Azerbaijani	6,425	0.64%	4,580	0.59%	3,465	0.53%	1,445	0.3%
Tatar	4,825	0.48%	2,850	0.37%	2,300	0.35%	875	0.18%
Pashtun	4,810	0.48%	3,315	0.43%	1,690	0.26%	1,040	0.22%
(Georgia (country)) Georgian	4,775	0.47%	3,155	0.41%	2,200	0.34%	970	0.2%
(Uzbekistan) Uzbek	3,920	0.39%	2,725	0.35%	N/A	N/A	N/A	N/A
(Kazakhstan) Kazakh	3,330	0.33%	2,270	0.29%	N/A	N/A	N/A	N/A
(Tajikistan) Tajik	2,905	0.29%	2,400	0.31%	N/A	N/A	N/A	N/A
(Kuwait) Kuwaiti	2,240	0.22%	2,240	0.29%	1,575	0.24%	855	0.18%
Uyghur	1,555	0.15%	1,155	0.15%	N/A	N/A	N/A	N/A
Hazara	1,520	0.15%	N/A	N/A	N/A	N/A	N/A	N/A
(Kyrgyzstan) Kyrgyz	1,055	0.1%	N/A	N/A	N/A	N/A	N/A	N/A
(Turkmenistan) Turkmen	1,040	0.1%	N/A	N/A	N/A	N/A	N/A	N/A
Other; Arab	111,405	11.02%	94,640	12.16%	86,135	13.2%	71,705	14.83%
Other; West and Central Asian	25,280	2.5%	16,540	2.12%	12,075	1.85%	8,805	1.82%
(Canada) Total West and Central; Asian Canadian population	1,011,150	100%	778,465	100%	652,645	100%	483,415	100%

=== Religion ===
Religious background of West Asian Canadians (2001)
1. Islam (53.0%)
2. Orthodox (11.0%)
3. Mainline Protestant (9.00%)
4. Catholic (8.00%)
5. Irreligion (6.00%)
6. Others (13.0%)

== Geographical distribution ==
=== Provinces & territories ===
West Asian population by province or territory (2016)
Province / territory	Population	Percentage
Ontario	523,340	4%
Quebec	240,795	3%
British Columbia	99,560	2.2%
Alberta	97,355	2.4%
Nova Scotia	17,205	1.9%
Manitoba	11,850	1%
Saskatchewan	9,415	0.9%
New Brunswick	6,835	0.9%
Newfoundland and Labrador	2,660	0.5%
Prince Edward Island	1,625	1.2%
Northwest Territories	215	0.5%
Yukon	195	0.6%
Nunavut	100	0.3%
Canada	1,011,145	2.9%

== See also ==
- Arab Canadians
- Asian Canadians

== Bibliography ==
- Abu-Laban, Baha (1983), "The Canadian Muslim Community: The Need for a New Survival Strategy", in Waugh, Earle H.; Abu-Laban, Baha; Abu-Qureshi, Regula (eds.), The Muslim Community in North America, University of Alberta, ISBN 0-88864-034-X
- Aksan, Virginia H. (1999), "Turks", in Magocsi, Paul R. (ed.), Encyclopedia of Canada's Peoples, University of Toronto Press, ISBN 0-8020-2938-8
- Ouzounian, N. (2003). "Կանադա [Canada]". In Ayvazyan, Hovhannes (ed.). Հայ Սփյուռք հանրագիտարան [Encyclopedia of the Armenian Diaspora] (in Armenian). Yerevan: Armenian Encyclopedia Publishing. pp. 331-342. ISBN 5-89700-020-4.
