= Raffi Radio =

Studio album by Raffi
- Released: 1995
- Genre: Children's, traditional pop, jazz
- Length: 40:54

Raffi chronology
Bananaphone (1994)	Raffi Radio (1995)	The Singable Songs Collection (1996)

Professional ratings
Review scores
Source	Rating
Emergency Librarian	4/5 stars
AllMusic	3/5 stars

Raffi Radio is a children's music concept album released by Raffi and Michael Creber in 1995.

The album is dedicated to Buckminster Fuller.

== Concept ==
Raffi Radio "mimics an old-time radio show", with children's songs interspersed with weather reports, guest interviews, and news segments.

Raffi and his puppet co-host Sleido JazzDog host the show from a radio station in the fictional location of Troubadouria.

From the shoreline of Troubadouria, somewhere over the bay, where the time is now and the place is right here, we bring you Raffi Radio vibrations...

It's the Raffi Radio Show, with your host, Raffi, and his co-host, Sleido JazzDog.

With friends and features, special guests, and delightful music for your listening pleasure.

— Opening, Raffi Radio

== Track listing ==
All tracks are written by Raffi and Michael Creber, except where noted

Part One
No.	Title	Lyrics	Music	Length
1.	"Opening"			1:44
2.	"Raffi Radio"			3:30
3.	"Kitchen Sing Sing"			2:15
4.	"Berry Nice News – Seasons"	Raffi	The Four Seasons by Antonio Vivaldi	0:54
5.	"Sunflower"			3:47
6.	"Roving Reporter"	Raffi, Debi Pike, Bert Simpson	excerpt from All I Really Need by Raffi	1:28
7.	"Sleido's Song"			1:37
8.	"Silly Panel – Audio"			1:38
9.	"Coconut"			3:39

Part Two
No.	Title	Lyrics	Music	Length
10.	"Weather Report"	Raffi	Creber and Raffi	2:47
11.	"Skip To My Lou"	Traditional	Traditional	2:09
12.	"Berry Nice News – Bananas"	Raffi		0:54
13.	"Julia"			0:33
14.	"Ripple of Love"			3:37
15.	"Silly Panel – Time"			1:26
16.	"Six Little Ducks"	Traditional	Traditional	0:39
17.	"Sax Interview"	Raffi	Tom Colclough (Saxophone)	1:23
18.	"Wishing Well"			1:25
19.	"Whatever You Choose"	Bailey Rattray	Raffi	2:12
20.	"Every Child"			3:17
