= The Shmenge Polka =

The Shmenge Polka may refer to:

- "The Shmenge Polka", an episode of the comedy show Second City Television
- "The Shmenge Polka", an instrumental track by Raffi on his 1994 album Bananaphone
