= Baby Beluga =

Studio album by Raffi
- Released: July 10, 1980
- Recorded: April 1980
- Genre: Children's music
- Length: 35:09
- Labels: Shoreline/Troubadour, A&M (Original U.S. Distributor), MCA (Second U.S. Distributor) Rounder Records (Third and Current U.S. Distributor)
- Producers: Raffi, Ken Whiteley

Raffi chronology
The Corner Grocery Store (1979)	Baby Beluga (1980)	Rise and Shine (1982)

Professional ratings
Review scores
Source	Rating
Allmusic	4.5/5 stars

Baby Beluga is a children's music album by Canadian children's entertainer Raffi, released in 1980. The lead song is about a young beluga whale that swims freely. The album begins with the sounds of beluga whales communicating and includes compositions that create images of the ocean and whales at play. An illustrated sing-along book was also published and sold separately as a companion to the first track.

== Track listing ==
1. "Baby Beluga" – 2:42
2. "Biscuits in the Oven" – 2:26
3. "Oats and Beans and Barley" – 1:27
4. "Day-O" – 3:01
5. "Thanks A Lot" – 2:28
6. "To Everyone in All the World" (Pete Seeger) – 1:46
7. "All I Really Need" – 3:46
8. "Over in the Meadow" – 2:18
9. "This Old Man" (Traditional) – 2:25
10. "Water Dance" – 1:55
11. "Kumbaya" (Traditional) – 2:23
12. "Joshua Giraffe" – 6:05
13. "Morningtown Ride" (Malvina Reynolds) – 2:24

== Personnel ==
- Raffi – Lead vocals, guitar, bells, producer, arranger, mixer
- Ken Whiteley – Guitars, vocals, banjos, accordion, mandolin, organ, piano, percussion, ukulele, mixer, producer
- Chris Whiteley – Trumpet, harmonica
- Dennis Pendrith – Bass, vocals
- Bucky Berger – Drums
- Bruce Cockburn – Guitar
- Bruce Pennycook – Clarinets, alto saxophone, tenor saxophone, baritone saxophone
- Dick Smith – Drums, percussion, vocals
- Patrick Godfrey – Piano, vocals
- Mike Gardner – Bass
- Grit Laskin – Button accordion, concertina, dulcimer, longneck mandolin, penny whistle
- The Honolulu Heartbreakers – Vocals
- Daniel Lanois – Mixer, engineer
- Children's chorus: Jenny Whiteley, Dan Whiteley, Elizabeth Macay, Chris Thompson
