= Onnig Cavoukian =

Canadian-Armenian photographer

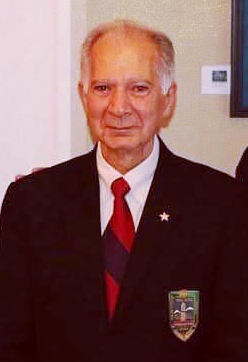
- Born: Onnig J. Cavoukian; 1945 (age 80–81); Cairo, Egypt
- Other name: Cavouk
- Citizenship: Canadian
- Occupation: Photographer
- Relatives: Raffi (brother); Ann Cavoukian (sister)

Onnig J. "Cavouk" Cavoukian (born 1945) is a Canadian-Armenian photographer.

== Life and career ==
Born in Cairo in 1945 to ethnic Armenian parents Artin and Lucie Cavoukian, Onnig Cavoukian moved with his family from Cairo to Canada in 1958. He is the brother of the well-known Canadian children's entertainer Raffi and of Ann Cavoukian, the former Information and Privacy Commissioner of Ontario.

Onnig Cavoukian followed in the footsteps of his grandfather Ohanness Cavoukian and his father Artin in becoming a portrait photographer. His grandfather escaped Turkey during the Armenian genocide, moving to Egypt. His family moved to Toronto after the 1952 abdication of Farouk of Egypt.

During his career, Cavouk's subjects included Indira Gandhi, the Queen Mother, Queen Elizabeth II, Oscar Peterson, Pierre and Margaret Trudeau, Leonid Brezhnev, Patrick Macnee, Hubert Humphrey, and Pat Nixon.

Three Canadian stamps have been made from portraits by Cavouk, of Roland Michener, Maureen Forrester, and Sam McLaughlin respectively.

After spending most of his adult life in Toronto, Cavouk moved in April 2006 to Winona, Ontario, on a property next to Fifty Point Conservation Area. He now lives on Vancouver Island, British Columbia.
