= Uzbek Canadians =

Canadians of Uzbek ancestry

Canadian Uzbeks
Kanadalik O'zbeklar

Total population
- 3,920 (by ancestry, 2016 Census)

Regions with significant populations
- Ontario and Quebec

Languages
- Canadian English · Canadian French · Uzbek · Tajik · Russian

Religion
- Sunni Islam

Related ethnic groups
- Other Turkic peoples

Uzbek Canadians are Canadian citizens of Uzbek descent or persons of Uzbek descent residing in Canada. According to the 2016 Census there were 3,920 Canadians who claimed Uzbek ancestry. There is a small group of Uzbeks in the city of Guelph. There are 150 ethnic Uzbek families from Afghanistan. The Uzbeks of Guelph are mainly coming from cities of Andkhoi and Faryab.

== Notable Uzbek Canadians ==
- Artour "Arteezy" Babaev, professional Dota player
- Liane Balaban, actress

== See also ==
- Middle Eastern Canadians
- West Asian Canadians
