= Aris Alexanian =

Armenian Canadian businessman

Aris Luke Alexanian Արիստակէս Ղուկաս Ալիքսանեան
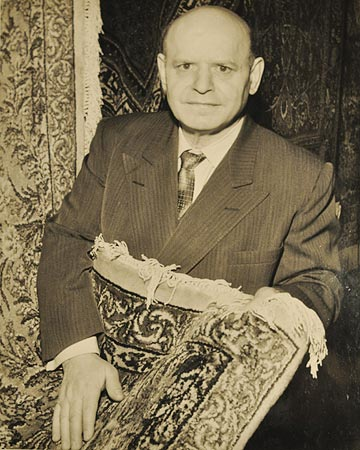
- Aris Alexanian, with oriental rug
- Born: 1901; Agin, Ottoman Empire
- Died: June 27, 1961 (aged 59–60); Hamilton, Ontario, Canada
- Children: 3

Aris Luke Alexanian (Արիստակէս Ղուկաս Ալիքսանեան) (1901–June 27, 1961) was a noted world traveller, prominent Armenian Canadian and business man. Also, referred to in articles and publications as A. L. Alexanian and Aris L. Alexanian.

== Early life ==
Little is known of Alexanian's early life. He was born in Ağın in the Ottoman Empire in 1901. His exact date of birth is unknown. He was orphaned at an early age with the untimely death of both his parents. He went into hiding for 6 months, in the Anatolia region of the empire, to escape from the Armenian genocide. He was shot and wounded during this period. Eventually he was able to escape. He arrived in New York City in 1920 and then moved to Canada in 1921.

== Armenian Boys' Farm ==
In 1923 Alexanian moved to Georgetown, Ontario, to become a teacher and assistant superintendent at a school and farm for Armenian orphans called the Armenian Boys' Farm. The boys were victims of the Armenian genocide. Between 1900 and 1914 Canada took in some 1500 Armenian refugees. Then in the early 1920s thousands more came to Canada, including a group that came to be called the Georgetown Boys. The Georgetown school took in 110 boys who were educated and trained for farming. During this period Alexanian founded and organized the publishing of a monthly newsletter called "Ararat", which featured the art and writing of the orphan boys. The newsletter helped develop the English language skills of the boys before it was transformed into an Armenian-only publication.

Alexanian was included as a character in a play set around the Georgetown orphanage. The play "The Georgetown Boys" was premiered at the John Elliot Theatre in Georgetown in 2008. Alexanian is also featured as a character in a children's book titled "Call Me Aram", which is also about the Georgetown Boys. More recently he was portrayed as a character in a musical titled "The Georgetown Boys: A Musical" performed at the John F. Kennedy Center for the Performing Arts in April 2009.

== Marriage and family ==
In January 1927 in Georgetown, Alexanian married Mary Boghosian, who had recently arrived in Canada from Egypt. They lived for a time at the orphanage, before moving to Hamilton. They eventually had three sons together.

== Move to Hamilton, Ontario ==
Alexanian moved to Hamilton, Ontario in 1927, where he opened an oriental rug store, called Oriental Art Galleries. His first year's sales totaled $64. He imported handmade carpets from around the world and eventually travelled extensively in the Middle East to buy carpets for his business. During this period he also started a rug cleaning operation.

== World Traveller ==
During the late 1940s and early 1950s Alexanian travelled extensively to the Middle East to buy carpets. Few people in the Hamilton area at the time travelled to these exotic lands, so his trips were a source of local interest. His travels were often chronicled in The Hamilton Spectator. A map in the window of his downtown Hamilton store was used to trace his journeys. Upon his return from these travels he would often lecture to local community and church groups and show photographs and films from his trips. By 1958 he claimed to have travelled 304,000 miles outside the country since the war. Alexanian was also an accomplished linguist and could speak six languages, which he used to his advantage for business negotiations in the more that 15 countries he typically visited during his travels.

== Expanding the Carpet Business ==
Alexanian began to expand his carpet business in 1950, and opened a second store in Ottawa, Ontario. He also expanded the rug cleaning operation in Hamilton. In 1955 the company was incorporated under the name of Alexanian and Sons Limited.

== Community involvement ==
Alexanian was involved in numerous community groups. He was a supporter of the Armenian Apostolic Church, the Ancient Landmarks of Hamilton group, and the Kiwanis Club. Alexanian, through his travels, developed many friendships and connections around the world. He was a personal friend of Mirza Osman Ali Baig, the Pakistani High Commissioner to Canada, who visited Hamilton in May 1955 and was a guest speaker at the Hamilton Kiwanis Club.

== Death ==
Alexanian died on June 27, 1961. The biography and obituary printed in the Hamilton Spectator announcing his death described him as "one of Canada's leading rug importers and probably Hamilton's most widely travelled merchant".

== Legacy ==
Alexanian through his commitment to public service has inspired a long tradition of community involvement within his family and business. Alexanian Carpet and Flooring has been a long time patron of the arts, in particular, theatre, music and opera. Albert is a member of the Ontario Arts Council, a volunteer executive with the Council for Business and the Arts in Canada and with the Canadian Association of Family Enterprises. Armen has been honoured for nearly 50 years of service with the Kiwanis Club, and has held numerous position in the organization, including President. He is also special advisor to the University of Waterloo Circle K Club. Aram was a supporter of the Armenian Church of Canada and a founding member of St. Mary Armenian Church in Hamilton.
