= Ken Whiteley =

- Born: Kenneth David Whiteley; April 30, 1951 (age 75); Bellefonte, Pennsylvania, U.S.
- Genre: Folk
- Instruments: Guitar, banjo, mandolin, fiddle, ukulele, jug, piano, accordion, harmonica, kazoo, percussion, vocals
- Years active: 1965–present
- Website: KenWhiteley.com

Kenneth Whiteley (born April 30, 1951) is a multi-instrumentalist, producer and composer. He began performing folk music in the early 1970s, making frequent appearances at the Mariposa Folk Festival and recording and touring with acclaimed children's performer Raffi. Whiteley frequently performed with his brother Chris Whiteley and later with his niece and nephew Jenny Whiteley and Daniel Whiteley. Whiteley has been honoured with numerous awards, including a Genie Award in 2004, and he was inducted into the Mariposa Festival Hall of Fame in 2008.

== Early life and career ==
Whiteley was born in Bellefonte, Pennsylvania to Canadian parents. They moved to Toronto when Whiteley was five years old. He began to play guitar at the age of twelve and was influenced at an early age by the folk, blues and jug band traditions. He began performing with his older brother Chris Whiteley and in 1965 they, along with clarinettist Tom Evens, formed the Original Sloth Band. The trio recorded three albums and appeared at numerous folk festivals, including Mariposa, the Winnipeg Folk Festival and the Vancouver Folk Festival. Whiteley became a Life Member of the Toronto Musicians' Association, Local 149 of the American Federation of Musicians, in May 2017.

== Discography ==
- Join the Band
- The Light of Christmas
- Long Time Traveling
- Freedom Blues

With Chris Whiteley

- Chris and Ken Whiteley In Junior Jug Band
- Sixteen Shades of Blue
