= Oats Peas Beans and Barley Grow =

British-Canadian-American folk song

"Oats, Peas, Beans and Barley Grow" (often sung as "Oats (and) Beans (and) Barley Grow") is a traditional British-Canadian-American folk song, 1380 in the Roud Folk Song Index.

The tune normally used goes by the name "Baltimore" and appears in Joshua Cushing's book "The Fifer's Companion" (1790). According to Alice Bertha Gomme's book "The Traditional Games of England, Scotland and Ireland" (1894), this is a "play song", in which children perform actions with the song, standing in a ring. In "Notes and Queries" 7th series, number xii (c 1870) it is discussed, but the Columbia State University website claims that the earliest known version of the words is dated 1898 (Gomme).

== Published versions ==
- Lucy Broadwood English County Songs
- In Notes and Queries 7th series, number xii (c 1870)
- In Northall, G. F. English Folk-Rhymes: A collection of traditional verses relating to places and persons, customs, superstitions, etc. (1892) pg. 370
- Gillington, Old Isle of Wight Singing Games (1909) pp.10-11
- Hampshire Dance Tunes by Bob Shatwell & Paul Sartin (2007)
- The very first edition of the Journal of the EFDSS had an article on this song.
