= Raffi =

Canadian singer-songwriter and children's advocate (born 1948)

Raffi CC OBC
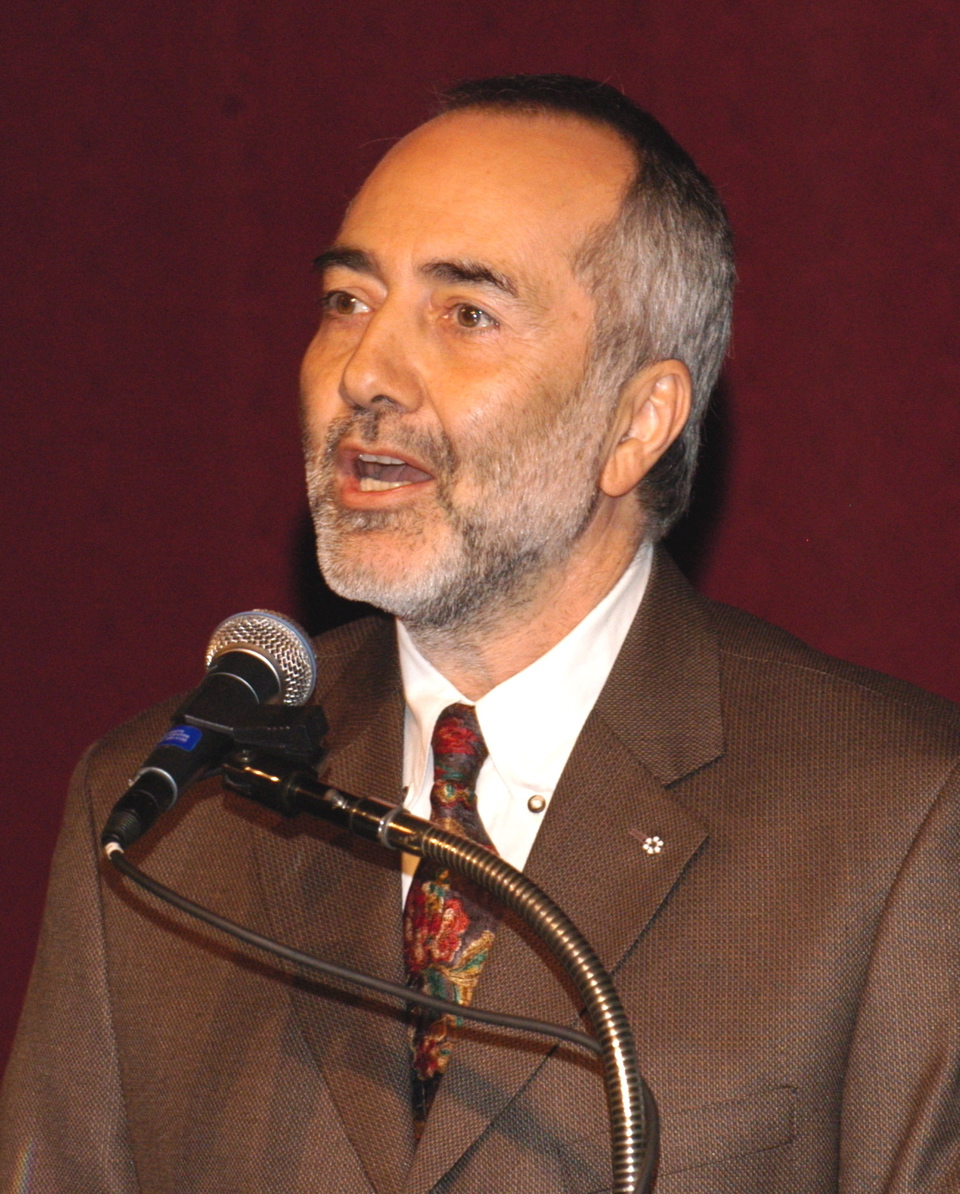
- Raffi in 2007

Background information
- Born: Raffi Cavoukian; 8 July 1948 (age 78); Cairo, Egypt
- Origin: Toronto, Ontario, Canada
- Genres: Children's music; children's literature
- Occupations: Musician; singer; songwriter; author; essayist; lecturer
- Instruments: Vocals; guitar; ukulele
- Years active: 1970s–present
- Spouse: Deborah Pike (m. 1975; div. 1991)
- Website: raffinews.com raffifoundation.org

Raffi Cavoukian CC OBC (Armenian: Րաֆֆի, born 8 July 1948), known professionally by the mononym Raffi, is an Egyptian-born Armenian-Canadian singer-lyricist and author. A performer of children's music, The Washington Post called him "the most popular children's singer in the English-speaking world". He founded the Raffi Foundation for Child Honouring, an initiative focused on promoting children's rights and well-being. He has also been involved in advocacy for environmental and social causes, addressing issues like commercial exploitation of children and climate change through his music and public appearances.

== Early life ==
Raffi was born in Cairo, Egypt, to Armenian Christian parents who fled Turkey during the Armenian genocide. His mother Lucie Cavoukian named him after the Armenian novelist Raffi. He was exposed to music at a young age, as his mother sang to him and his father sang and played accordion. In a 2024 interview, he noted that "In my early childhood, growing up in a fairly authoritarian family, my parents loved me greatly. But it was at times a coercive love, not exactly a respectful love". The family left Egypt in 1952, living in Jerusalem and Syria before immigrating to Canada in 1958, eventually settling in Toronto, Ontario.

His father, Arto (Artin) Cavoukian, was a portrait photographer with a studio on Bloor Street in Toronto. His older brother, Onnig Cavoukian, known as Cavouk, is also a portrait photographer. His younger sister is Ann Cavoukian, Ontario's former Information and Privacy Commissioner. His parents died within twelve hours of each other, his mother dying first of abdominal cancer. He visited Soviet Armenia once in 1972.

== Career ==
=== Children's entertainer ===
In the early 1970s, Raffi frequented a Toronto guitar store near Yonge and Wellesley called Millwheel, where he met other Canadian musicians such as David Wilcox and John Lacey. He befriended Lacey, a folk guitarist from Oakville, Ontario, who helped Raffi improve his finger picking. Raffi continued playing folk guitar in coffee houses in Toronto and Montréal before hitchhiking to Vancouver in 1972.

His first performance for children was in 1974, at a nursery school run by his mother-in-law. His first album, Singable Songs for the Very Young, was produced in Daniel Lanois's basement and released in 1976. The album was influenced by three educators, including his then-wife.

Most of Raffi's children's albums include small, simple, folk instrumentations featuring Raffi's vocal and guitar work. Early works included contributions from Toronto-area folk musicians, including Ken Whiteley, The Honolulu Heartbreakers, and Bruce Cockburn. Raffi also incorporated world music sounds into his records, including "Sambalele" (More Singable Songs, 1977) and "Anansi" (The Corner Grocery Store, 1979). Some of Raffi's best-known children's songs are "Bananaphone", "All I Really Need", and "Down by the Bay".

In 1979, he wrote "Baby Beluga", after meeting a female beluga whale named Kavna at the Vancouver Aquarium.

In 1989, his album Raffi In Concert With The Rise And Shine Band was listed on the RPM Top 100 Albums chart. He took a break from music from 1989 to 1990.

In 1999, he released his autobiography, The Life of a Children’s Troubadour.

After a seven-year gap in publishing, Raffi released an album, Let's Play, in 2002. Between 2003 and 2013, he took a hiatus from touring.

He is he president of Troubadour Music Inc., a triple-bottom-line company he founded to produce and promote his work. He released recordings for a number of other artists, including Caitlin Hanford and Chris Whiteley.

As of 2017, Raffi continues to perform and appears occasionally across Canada and the United States. His most recent album is "Penny Penguin", a collaboration album with Canadian trio The Good Lovelies which was released in 2024.

=== Advocacy ===
Raffi's recent musical work focuses on social and environmental causes and appeals to the generation who grew up with his children's music ("Beluga Grads") to effect change in the world. He also promotes those causes through his books, academic lectures and as a speaker.

Raffi has been involved with environmental advocacy since 1989, releasing a music album for adults about climate change, Evergreen, Everblue, the following year.

In 2004, he released "Salaam Shalom," a song calling for the end of the Israeli-Palestinian conflict.

In 2007, Raffi wrote, recorded and produced the single "Cool It", a rockabilly "call to action" on global warming with Dr. David Suzuki in the chorus. "Cool It" was the theme song for Dr. Suzuki's recent Canadian tour to promote action on climate change. In February 2016, Raffi released the song "Wave of Democracy" in support of American Senator Bernie Sanders run to be the Democratic nominee for US Presidency. In September 2019 he released song "Young People Marching", which was written for Greta Thunberg.

In August 2020, Raffi released a song titled "For All You Do," featuring Lindsay Munroe and cellist Yo-Yo Ma. The song honoured frontline and essential workers during the COVID-19 pandemic. Proceeds from downloads and streams were donated to Direct Relief to support healthcare workers globally.

Raffi is a member of the Canadian charity Artists Against Racism.

=== Child honouring ===
In 1997, Raffi developed the idea of "child honouring", which he described in 2021 as "a vision of an extraordinary social-change revolution with the universal human at its heart, and that universal human is the human child". In 2006, he described the child honouring ethic is described as a "vision, an organizing principle, and a way of life—a revolution in values that calls for a profound redesign of every sphere of society." His "Covenant for Honouring Children" outlines the principles of this philosophy.

In 2006, with Dr. Sharna Olfman, he co-edited an anthology, Child Honouring: How to Turn This World Around, which introduces child honouring as a philosophy for restoring communities and ecosystems. It contains chapters by Penelope Leach, Fritjof Capra, David Korten, Riane Eisler, Mary Gordon, Graça Machel, Joel Bakan, Matthew Fox, Barbara Kingsolver, Jean-Daniel Ó Donncada, and others. The book's foreword is by the 14th Dalai Lama. The musical album Resisto Dancing: Songs of Compassionate Revolution was released as a tie-in for the book.

In a 2006 speech, Iona Campagnolo, Lieutenant Governor of British Columbia, referred to child honouring as a "vast change in the human paradigm."

Raffi advocates for a child's right to live free of commercial exploitation and he has consistently refused all commercial endorsement offers. Raffi's company has never directly advertised nor marketed to children. In 2005, he sent an open letter to Ted Rogers of Rogers Wireless, urging them to stop marketing cell phones to children. He also turned down a film proposal for "Baby Beluga" because of the nature of the funding, which was based on exploitative advertising and marketing.

In October 2006, Raffi was presented with the Fred Rogers Integrity Award by the Campaign for a Commercial-Free Childhood at the Judge Baker Children's Center in Boston, for his consistent refusal to use his music in endorsements that market products directly to children.

In 2012, after learning details surrounding the online bullying, exploitation and ultimate suicide of teenager Amanda Todd, Raffi and his Raffi Foundation for Child Honouring co-founded the Red Hood Project with business owner, former Crown prosecutor, community and arts philanthropist and advocate Sandy Garossino and design professional, writer, educator and community activist Mark Busse. Red Hood Project is a movement for consumer protection for children online that launched in November 2012.

In June 2013, Raffi published the book Lightweb Darkweb: Three Reasons to Reform Social Media Before it Re-forms Us, which examines both the benefits and the dangers present on the internet and in social media.

== Personal life ==
In 1975, Raffi married Deborah Pike, a kindergarten teacher and high school classmate; they divorced in 1991. He became a vegetarian in 1980.

Although Raffi's music is geared towards children, Raffi has never had any children himself.

He owned a home on Salt Spring Island in British Columbia from 2008 until 2024, when he put the property on the market. He has been a critic of U.S. President Donald Trump, especially regarding the effects of his policies on children and youth.

== Awards and memberships ==
- Order of Canada (1983).
- 125th Anniversary of the Confederation of Canada Medal (1992).
- Canadian Version of the Queen Elizabeth II Golden Jubilee Medal (2002).
- Canadian Version of the Queen Elizabeth II Diamond Jubilee Medal (2012).
- Order of British Columbia (2001).
- Doctor of Music, from the University of Victoria (honorary degree)
- Doctor of Letters, from the University of British Columbia (honorary degree)
- Doctor of Letters, from Wilfrid Laurier University (honorary degree)
- Fred Rogers Integrity Award (2006)
- Special Achievement Award at the SOCAN Awards in Toronto in 2000.
- 2010 Top 25 Canadian Immigrant Award Winner.
- Honorary Doctorate of Letters, Vancouver Island University (2014)
- Companion of the Order of Canada (2025)

== Works ==
=== Discography ===
==== Studio albums ====
- Good Luck Boy (1975)
- Singable Songs for the Very Young (1976)
- Adult Entertainment (1977)
- More Singable Songs (1977)
- The Corner Grocery Store (1979)
- Baby Beluga (1980)
- Rise and Shine (1982)
- Raffi's Christmas Album (1983)
- One Light, One Sun (1985)
- Everything Grows (1987)
- Evergreen Everblue (1990)
- Bananaphone (1994)
- Raffi Radio (1995)
- Country Goes Raffi (2001) (tribute album)
- Let's Play (2002)
- Where We All Belong (2003)
- Song for the Dalai Lama (2004) (commemorative CD)
- Resisto Dancing – Songs of Compassionate Revolution (2006)
- Communion (2009)
- Love Bug (2014)
- Owl Singalong (2016)
- Dog on the Floor (2018)
- Nursery Rhymes For Kinder Times (with Lindsay Munroe) (2022)
- Penny Penguin (with The Good Lovelies) (2024)
- Love Is Everywhere (2026)

==== Live albums ====
- Raffi in Concert with the Rise and Shine Band (1989)
- Raffi on Broadway (1993)

==== Compilations ====
- Raffi in Concert (1996)
- The Singable Songs Collection (1996)
- Raffi's Box of Sunshine (2000)
- Quiet Time (2006)
- Animal Songs (2008)
- Songs of Our World (2008)
- Fun Food Songs (2013)
- Best Of Raffi (2017)
- Motivational Songs (2019)

==== Singles ====
===== Singable Songs for the Very Young (1976) =====
- "The More We Get Together"
- "Down By the Bay"
- "Brush Your Teeth"
- "Robin in the Rain"
- "Five Green and Speckled Frogs"
- "I Wonder If I'm Growing"
- "Aikendrum"
- "Bumping Up and Down"
- "Must Be Santa"
- "Willoughby Wallaby Woo"
- "Spider on the Floor"
- "Baa Baa Black Sheep"
- "Going to the Zoo"
- "The Dreidel Song"
- "Peanut Butter Sandwich"
- "Five Little Pumpkins"
- "The Sharing Song"
- "Mr. Sun"
- "Old MacDonald Had a Band"

===== More Singable Songs (1977) =====
- "Six Little Ducks"
- "You Gotta Sing"
- "Oh Me, Oh My!"
- "He'll Be Coming Down the Chimney"
- "Shake My Sillies Out"
- "If I Had a Dinosaur"
- "I've Been Working on the Railroad"

===== The Corner Grocery Store (1979) =====
- "Knees Up Mother Brown"
- "Cluck, Cluck, Red Hen"
- "My Way Home"
- "Anansi"
- "The Corner Grocery Store"
- "Y A Un Rat"/"Sur le Pont d'Avignon"
- "Going on a Picnic"
- "Goodnight, Irene"

===== Baby Beluga (1980) =====
- "Baby Beluga"
- "Biscuits in the Oven"
- "Oats, Peas, Beans and Barley Grow"
- "Day-O (The Banana Boat Song)"
- "Thanks a Lot"
- "To Everyone in All the World"
- "All I Really Need"
- "Over in the Meadow"
- "This Old Man"
- "Kumbaya"
- "Joshua Giraffe"
- "Morningtown Ride"

===== Rise and Shine (1982) =====
- "Rise and Shine"
- "Walk, Walk, Walk"
- "Thumbelina"
- "The Wheels on the Bus"
- "Daniel"
- "Five Little Ducks"
- "He's Got the Whole World"
- "Big Beautiful Planet"
- "I'm in the Mood"
- "Something In My Shoe"
- "Michaud"
- "Tete, Epaules"
- "Let's Do the Numbers Rhumba"
- "Ducks Like Rain"
- "Row, Row, Row"
- "This Little Light of Mine"

===== Raffi's Christmas Album (1983) =====
- "Every Little Wish"
- "A Child’s Gift of Love"

===== One Light, One Sun (1985) =====
- "Time to Sing"
- "Apples and Bananas"
- "Fais Dodo"
- "Riding in an Airplane"
- "Like Me and You"
- "The Bowling Song"
- "Tingalayo"
- "De Colores"
- "One Light, One Sun"
- "Twinkle, Twinkle, Little Star"

===== Everything Grows (1987) =====
- "Everything Grows"
- "Bathtime"
- "Just Like the Sun"
- "Haru Ga Kita"
- "Teddy Bear Hug"
- "Eight Piggies in a Row"
- "Let's Make Some Noise"

===== Evergreen Everblue (1990) =====
- "Evergreen Everblue"
- "Big Beautiful Planet"
- "Clean Rain"

==== Non-album singles ====
- On Hockey Days
- Wave of Democracy
- Song For Healing (featuring Lindsay Munroe)
- For All You Do (featuring Lindsay Munroe and Yo-Yo Ma)
- Young People Marching (for Greta Thunberg)

=== Filmography ===
- A Young Children's Concert with Raffi (1984)
- Raffi in Concert with the Rise and Shine Band (1988)
- Ferngully: The Last Rainforest (1992)
- Raffi on Broadway (1993)
- Raffi Renaissance (2007)

=== Bibliography ===
==== Adult ====
- The Life of a Children's Troubadour (2000)
- Raffi; Olfman, Sharna, eds. (2006). Child honoring: how to turn this world around. Westport, Conn: Praeger Publishers. ISBN 978-0-275-98981-1. OCLC 63660166.
- Lightweb Darkweb (2013)

==== Children ====
- Raffi (1987). Down by the bay. Raffi Songs to Read. Illustrated by Nadine Bernard Westcott. New York: Crown Publishers. ISBN 978-0-517-56644-2.
- Raffi Christmas Treasury (1988)
- Raffi (1987). Shake my sillies out. Raffi Songs to Read. Illustrated by David Allender. New York: Crown Publishers. ISBN 978-0-517-56646-6.
- Shake My Sillies Out (illustrated by David Allender) (1988)
- Tingalayo (illustrated by Kate Duke) (1988)
- Raffi (1989). Everything grows. Raffi Songs to Read (1st ed.). New York: Crown. ISBN 978-0-517-57275-7.
- Raffi (1992). Baby Beluga. Raffi Songs to Read. Illustrated by Ashley Wolff. Random House Children's Books. ISBN 9780517583623.
- Rise and Shine (illustrated by Eugenie Fernandes) (1995)
- One Light, One Sun (illustrated by Eugenie Fernandes) (1995)
- Like Me and You (illustrated by Lillian Hoban) (1996)
- Spider on the Floor (illustrated by True Kelley) (1996)
- This Little Light of Mine (illustrated by Stacey Schuett) (1997)
- Wheels on the Bus (illustrated by Sylvie Wickstrom) (1998)
- Five Little Ducks (illustrated by Jose Aruego and Ariane Dewey) (1999)
- Raffi (2021). Thanks a lot. Raffi Songs to Read. Illustrated by Jaime Kim. New York: Alfred A. Knopf. ISBN 978-0-593-17263-6. OCLC 1267537263.
