= Down by the Bay =

Children's song

- Traditional folk song
- Genre: Children's song
- Written: Unknown
- Published: Greece or England

"Down by the Bay" is a traditional children's song of uncertain origin.

== Origin ==
The actual origin of "Down by the Bay" is uncertain as it shares the melody with other songs. One of these a Greek folk song called "Γιαλό, γιαλό" ("γιαλό" meaning "bay" or "seaside") exists with this same melody. It is an Ionian Cantada, a style of folk music that originated in the late 19th century. In the modern era, this song may be most associated with Armenian-Canadian singer-lyricist Raffi, and appears on his 1976 album Singable Songs for the Very Young as his signature song. In an interview with the Vulture Newsletter, Raffi described it as being "An old, old song", saying that "It may have been a World War I song ... It came from England."

It has gained popularity as a campfire song among the Scouting Movement in Britain. Another version of the song is "Down by the Sea". The chorus from this was used by the folk band, Fiddler's Dram, in their song "Johnny John".

== Lyrics ==
The song lyrics are usually as follows:

Down by the Bay,
Where the watermelons grow,
Back to my home,
I dare not go,
For if I do,
My mother will say:

Usually, the insertion lyrics follow some kind of variation of the question "Did/(Have) you ever see(n) a <moose> <riding> a <goose>?", with the first and last items rhyming. For example:

- "Did you ever see a goose kissing a moose?" (or "moose kissing a goose")
- "Did you ever see a whale with a polka dot tail?"
- "Did you ever see a fly wearing a tie?"
- "Did you ever see a humpback whale kissing a snail?"
- "Did you ever see a bear combing his hair?"
- "Did you ever see a mouse painting a house?"
- "Did you ever see llamas eating their pajamas?"
- "Did you ever see a goat rowing a boat?"
- "Did you ever see a dragon pulling a wagon?"
- "Did you ever see a fox putting on socks?"
- "Did you ever see a fish doing hula on a dish?" (or "fish spinning a dish")
- "Did you ever see a parrot eating a carrot?"
- "Did you ever see a cat wearing a hat?"
- "Did you ever see a rhino kissing a dino?"
- "Did you ever see an octopus dancing with a platypus?"
- "Did you ever see a cow dancing at a pow-wow?"

The song can be ended with the following line:

- "Did you ever have a time when you couldn't make a rhyme?"

In a version (such as those inspired by children’s shows like Barney), it may also include:

- "Did you ever see some friends having fun that never ends?"

Each of the rhyming lines is followed by the ending line:

- "Down by the bay?"
