= Personal Health Information Protection Act =

Ontario legislation established in 2004

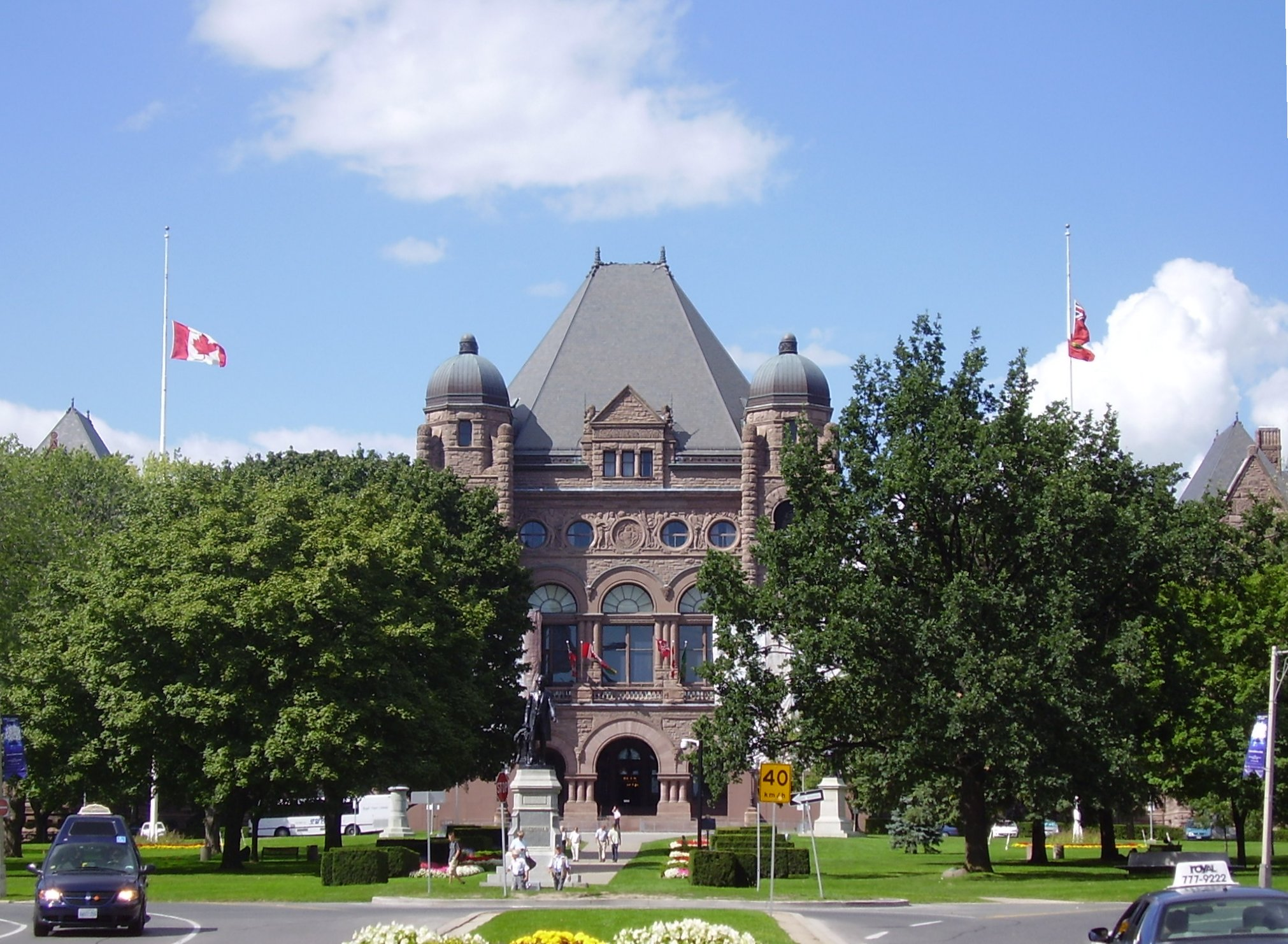

Legislative Assembly of Ontario
- Long title: An Ontario Act to establish consistent rules governing the collection, use and disclosure of personal health information in the hands of ’health information custodians‘, such as doctors, hospitals or other health care providers.
- Citation: S.O. 2004, Chapter 3 Schedule A
- Enacted by: Legislative Assembly of Ontario
- Assented to: 20 May 2004
- Commenced: 1 November 2004

Legislative history
- Bill title: Bill 31, Schedule A
- Introduced by: Ministry of Consumer and Business Services and the Ministry of Health and Long Term Care

The Personal Health Information Protection Act, 2004 (French: Loi de 2004 sur la protection des renseignements personnels sur la santé), also known as PHIPA, is Ontario legislation established in November 2004. PHIPA is one of two components of the Health Information Protection Act 2004.

The Health Information Protection Act, also established in 2004, comprises two schedules: PHIPA (Schedule A) and the Quality of Care Information Protection Act (Schedule B). The PHIPA replaced the Health Cards and Numbers Control Act (SO 1991, c 1).

PHIPA provides a set of rules for the collection, use and disclosure of personal health information by a "Health Information Custodian" (HIC), and includes the following provisions:

- Consent is required for the collection, use and disclosure of personal health information, with few exceptions
- HICs are required to treat all personal health information as confidential and maintain its security
- Individuals have a right to access their personal health information, as well as the right to correct errors
- Individuals have the right to instruct HICs not to share their personal health information with others
- Rules are provided for the use of personal health information for fundraising or marketing purposes
- Guidelines are set for the use and disclosure of personal health information as a secondary use such as research, quality improvement or education
- Accountability is ensured by granting an individual the right to complain if they have identified an error in their personal health information
- Remedies are established for breaches of the legislation

== History ==
- December 17, 2003: The Health Information Protection Act (Bill 31) was introduced by the first McGuinty government
- January 26, 2004: Public hearing at Standing Committee on General Government held in Toronto
- February 2, 2004: Public hearing at Standing Committee on General Government held in Sault Ste. Marie, Kingston and London
- February 9, 2004: and April 28, 2004 Clause-by-clause consideration of the Bill resulting in various amendments
- May 17, 2004: Bill 31 passed third and final reading with unanimous support in the legislature
- May 20, 2004: Bill 31 received Royal Assent
- July 3 - September 3, 2004: Public consultation on regulations
- November 1, 2004: Schedules A and B of the Health Information Protection Act come into force
- May 18, 2016: passage by the first Wynne government of the Health Information Protection Act 2016, S.O. 2016, c. 6 - Bill 119, to amend the Personal Health Information Protection Act, 2004, to make related amendments, to introduce the idea of an "ELECTRONIC HEALTH RECORD", to repeal and replace the Quality of Care Information Protection Act 2004 with the Quality of Care Information Protection Act 2016, and to amend the Regulated Health Professions Act, 1991

== Application ==
PHIPA applies to individuals and organizations involved in the delivery of healthcare services. Under the Act, they are referred to as HICs, "prescribed organizations", or "agencies", each with various function.

=== Health information custodians ===
A HIC can be any number of individuals or organizations who have custody or control of personal health information. To elaborate, some examples of an HIC include:

- Healthcare providers such as doctors, nurses, social workers, dentists, psychologists, paramedics, optometrists, physiotherapists, occupational therapists, chiropractors, massage therapists, dieticians, naturopaths and acupuncturists
- Hospitals
- Long-term care homes and homes for special care
- Community Care Access Centres
- Pharmacies
- Medical laboratories
- Local medical officers of health
- Ambulance services
- Community mental health programs
- Ministry of Health and Long-Term Care

=== Agents of health information custodians ===
An “agent” of an HIC includes anyone who is authorized by the HIC to do anything on behalf of the HIC with respect to personal health information. These actions are for the purposes of the HIC and not the agent.

Examples include:

- Employees of the HIC
- Clinician researchers conducting research under the jurisdiction of the HIC
- Persons contracted to provide services to the HIC where the person has access to personal health information (e.g. copying or shredding service, records management service)
- Volunteers or students who have any access to personal health information

== Role of the Information and Privacy Commissioner ==
The Information and Privacy Commissioner of Ontario (IPC) is appointed by the Legislative Assembly of Ontario and is independent of the government. The IPC is responsible for ensuring that HICs comply with the Act. Under PHIPA, the IPC has the power to review and make rulings about complaints.

Complaint	Time to File the Complaint
Personal health information has been collected, used or shared contrary to PHIPA	Within 1 year
A request to see personal health information has been denied	Within 6 months
A request to have personal health information corrected has been denied	Within 6 months

When the commissioner receives a complaint, a mediator may be appointed to try to solve the problem. The IPC has various powers to resolve complaints, including the power to order an HIC to:

- Change or stop the way information is collected, used or shared
- Provide access to the record of personal health information
- Correct the record of personal health information

== Content ==
The Act covers the following subjects relating to personal health information in the province of Ontario:

- Section 1: Interpretation and Application sets out of the purpose of the Act. It defines key terms used throughout the Act, such as "health information custodian" and "health information agent".
- Section 2: Practices to Protect Health Information details the required practices for the handling of personal health information and health records. Accountability of information is also discussed.
- Section 3: Consent Concerning Personal Health Information discusses consent for the use, collection and disclosure of personal health information. Capacity to consent and characteristics of substitute decision-making are outlined.
- Section 4: Collection, Use and Disclosure of Personal Health Information outlines the situations for when personal health information can be used, collected and disclosed, and for what purposes.
- Section 5: Access to Records of Personal Health Information and Correction summarizes an individual's right of access to their personal health information, and the necessary steps that are taken to correct information within their record if need be.
- Section 6: Admission and Enforcement details the role of the Commissioner in enforcing the Act.
- Section 7: General explains the general applications and details of the Act, including non-retaliation, immunity, Crown liability, reliance on assertion, offences and regulations.
