= A.R.S. Armenian School =

A.R.S. Armenian School Հ.Օ.Մ.-ի Ամէնօրեայ Վարժարան

Location
- 50 Hallcrown Place; Toronto, Ontario, M2J 4Y4; 43.7693°N 79.3241°W

Information
- School type: Private
- Founded: 1979
- Principal: Raffi Sarkissian
- Grades: K-12
- Enrollment: 640 (2019-2020)
- Language: Armenian, English, French
- Area: Toronto, Ontario
- Colours: Blue and Gold
- Team name: A.R.S. Lions - Առիւծները
- Website: http://www.arsdayschool.ca/

A.R.S. Armenian School (Հ.Օ.Մ.-ի Ամէնօրեայ Վարժարան (H.Ō.M.-i Amēnōryeah Varzharan) in Armenian) (also called A.R.S. Day School, or A.R.S. Armenian Private School) is a private day school in Toronto, Ontario, Canada. It is the largest co-educational, Armenian-Canadian trilingual and bi-cultural day school in Ontario, catering to students from Kindergarten through to Grade 12.

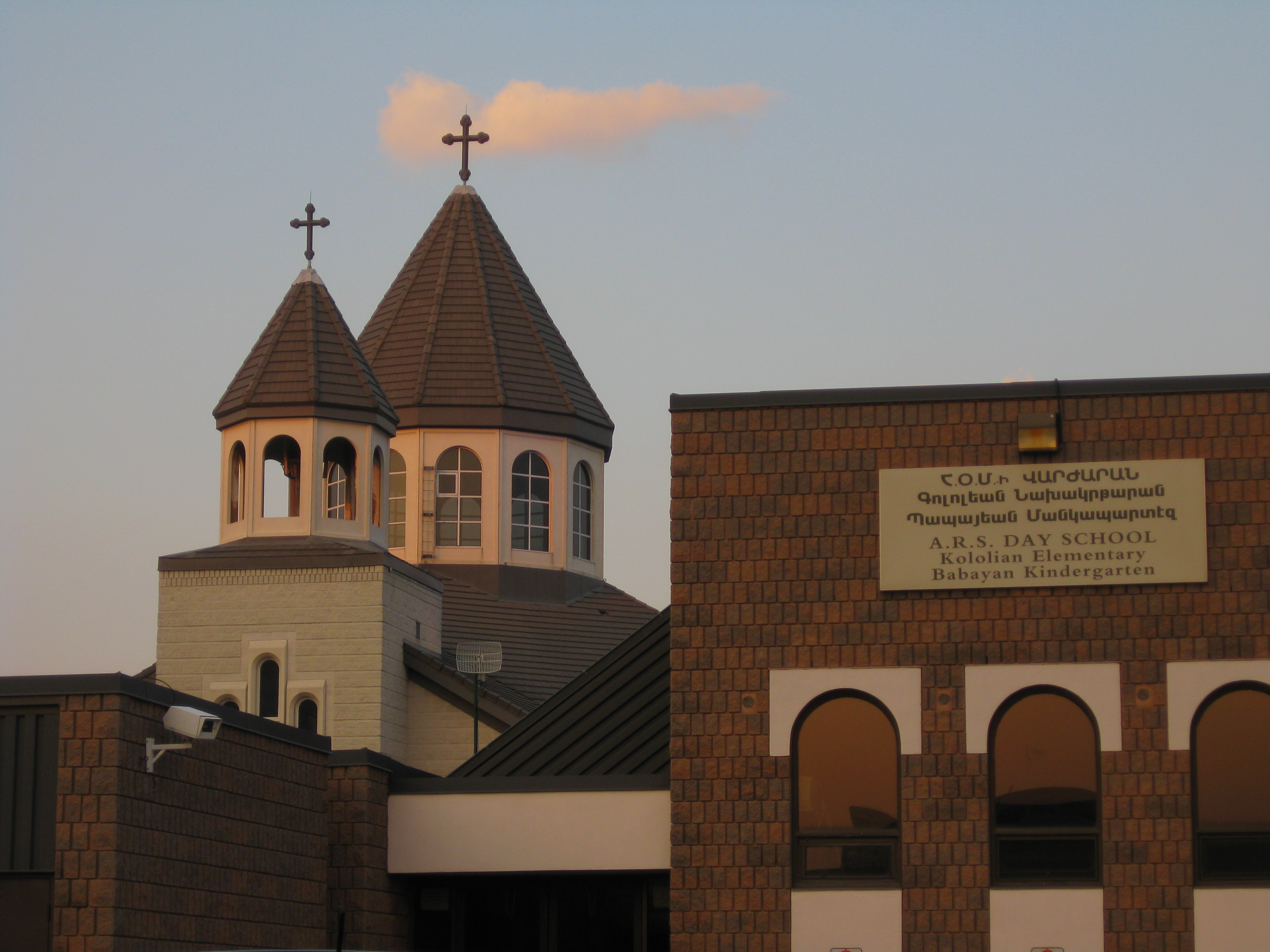
A.R.S. Armenian School - Grades K-3

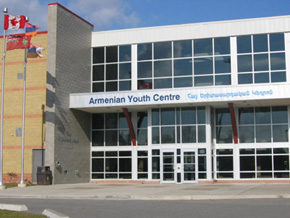
A.R.S. Armenian School - Grades 4-12

== History ==
The A.R.S. Babayan Kindergarten and Kololian Elementary School were founded in 1979 by the Armenian Community Centre of Toronto. Funds were secured through donations by members of Toronto's Armenian community, as well as with major gifts made by the Babayan Foundation charity and Mr. & Mrs. Kevork and Armenouhie Kololian. The school was established with an initial student roster of only 69 from Junior Kindergarten to Grade 2. The Armenian Community Centre housed the school's first classrooms.

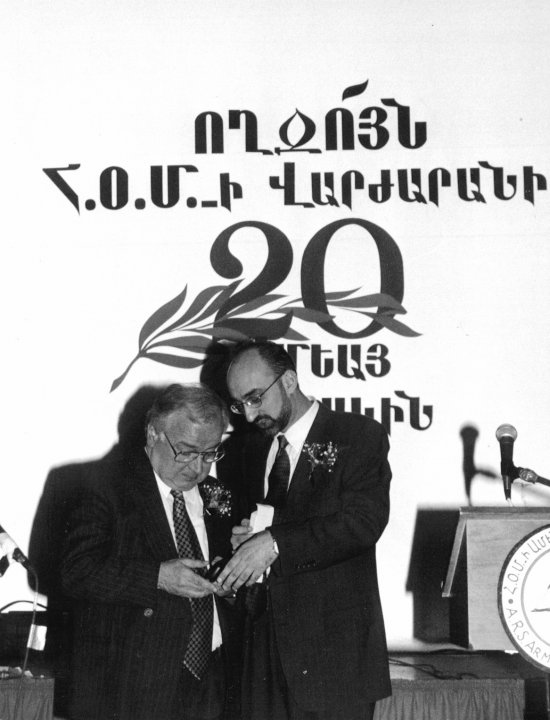
A.R.S. Armenian School's first and second principals, Mr. Markar Saraphanian (left) and Mr. Raffi Doudaklian (right) at the school's 20th anniversary celebrations (Toronto, 1999)

In 2001, the A.R.S. Armenian Secondary School was established, starting with the pioneer grade 9 class. In 2004, a new High School and a Youth Centre, adjacent to the Community Centre was completed which now houses grades 4 through 12. The school's student body has grown from 69 in 1979 to over 600 in 2015.

== Athletics ==
While academics are stressed at A.R.S., athletics and extra-curricular activities are also fervently encouraged. Physical Education is offered in kindergarten and at every grade level until it becomes optional in grade 11. There are also several extra-curricular athletic clubs:

- Basketball Girls (Sr/Jr)
- Basketball Boys (Sr/Jr)
- Volleyball Girls (Sr/Jr)
- Volleyball Boys (Sr/Jr)
- Soccer Girls (Sr/Jr)
- Soccer Boys (Sr/Jr)
- Badminton (Co-Ed)
