= Bananaphone =

Studio album by Raffi
- Released: September 27, 1994
- Recorded: March–June 1994
- Genre: Children's, traditional pop, jazz
- Length: 49:24
- Label: MCA Records Rounder

Raffi chronology
| Evergreen Everblue (1990) | Bananaphone (1994) | Raffi Radio (1995) |

Singles from Bananaphone
- 1. "Bananaphone" Released: 1994; 2. "Shake a Toe" Released: 1994; 3. "The World We Love" Released: 1994; 4. "Slow Day" Released: 1994; 5. "Naturally" Released: 1994

Professional ratings
Review scores
| Source | Rating |
|---|---|
| Allmusic | 4.5/5 stars |

Bananaphone is a children's album released by Raffi and Michael Creber in 1994. The album is best known for its title track, which uses puns such as "It's a phone with appeal!" (a peel) and nonce words like "bananular" and "interactive-odular" as Raffi extols the virtues of his unique telephone.

The song "C-A-N-A-D-A" was originally recorded by Stompin' Tom Connors under the title "Cross Canada".

The album was certified Gold by the CRIA in March 2002.

== Track listing ==
1. "Bananaphone" (Creber, Raffi) 3:12
2. "Shake a Toe" (Creber, Raffi) 2:20
3. "The World We Love" (Creber, Raffi) 3:23
4. "Slow Day" (Creber, Raffi) 3:25
5. "The Changing Garden of Mr. Bell" (Hubbard, Silversher) 4:07
6. "Naturally" (Creber, Raffi) 3:04
7. "Spring Flowers" [instrumental] (Raffi) 2:40
8. "C-A-N-A-D-A" (Connors) 2:50
9. "Michael Row the Boat Ashore" (Traditional) 3:25
10. "First Peoples" (Creber, Raffi) 4:37
11. "Dee Myth" [instrumental] (Raffi) 2:21
12. "Cowlit Night" (Raffi) 3:21
13. "The Gorilla Song" (Knowles, Knowles) 2:10
14. "Simple Gifts" (Traditional) 2:15
15. "Down by the Riverside" (Traditional) 3:13
16. "The Shmenge Polka" [instrumental] (A Tribute to the late John Candy) (Raffi) 2:07

== Cover versions ==
The album's title track has been covered in several different musical genres. Examples include a barbershop version, several heavy metal versions, a dubstep version and a bluegrass/country version by Rhonda Vincent released on the album Sing Along with Putumayo released by Putumayo World Music.

The Chilean children's show Cachureos released a cover of Bananaphone called "Teléfono" on its 1996 album, "La Mosca".
