= Ann Cavoukian =

Canadian data privacy researcher and former Ontario civil servant (born 1952)

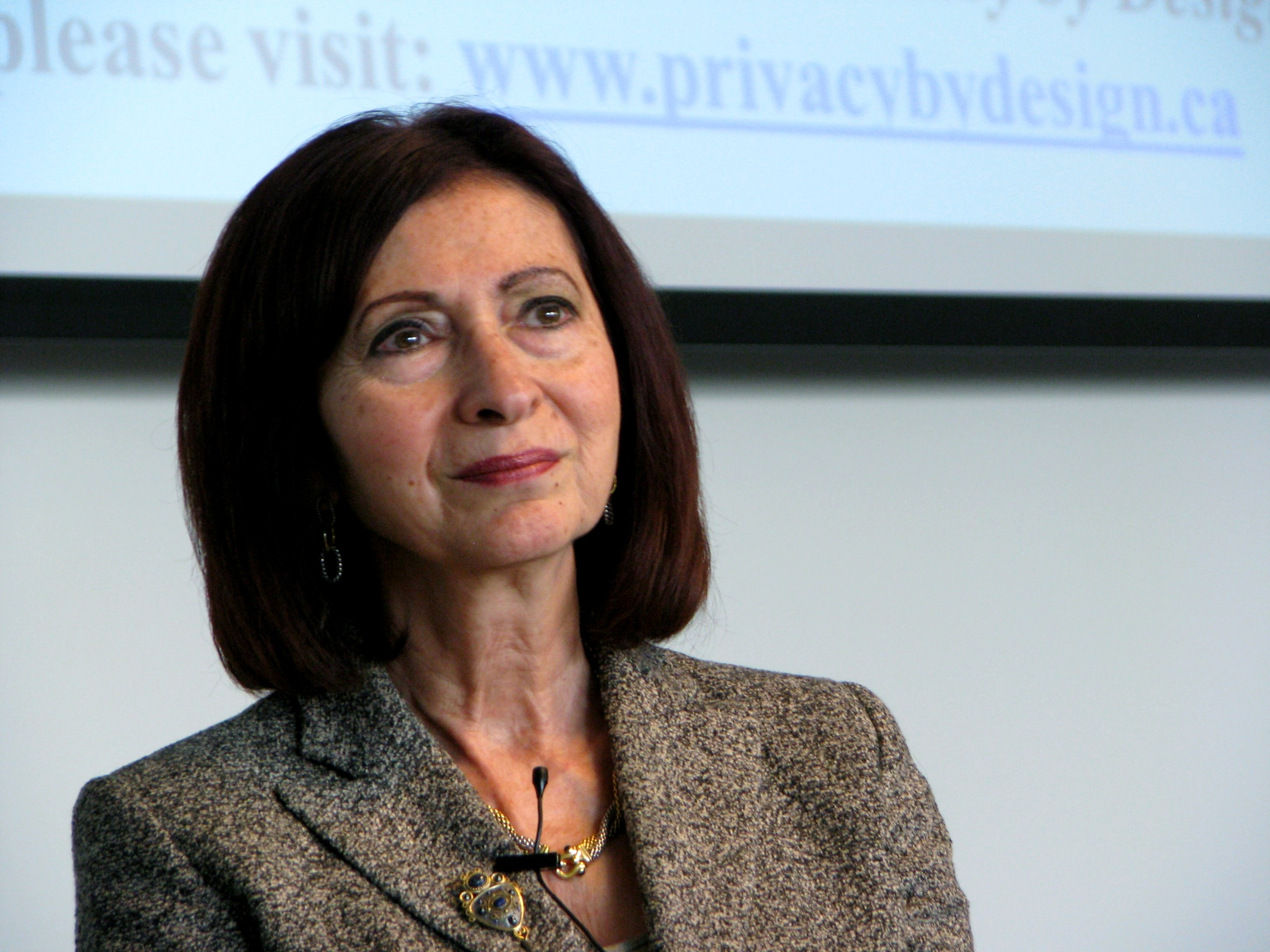
- Cavoukian in 2013

3rd Information and Privacy Commissioner of Ontario
- In office 1997–2014
- Preceded by: Tom Wright
- Succeeded by: Brian Beamish

Personal details
- Born: October 7, 1952 (age 74) Cairo, Egypt
- Relatives: Raffi (brother); Onnig Cavoukian (brother)
- Education: York University; University of Toronto

Ann Cavoukian (born October 7, 1952) is the former Information and Privacy Commissioner for the Canadian province of Ontario. Her concept of privacy by design, which takes privacy into account throughout the system engineering process, was expanded on, as part of a joint Canadian-Dutch team, both before and during her tenure as commissioner of Ontario (1997 to 2014).

She was hired by Ryerson University (now Toronto Metropolitan University) as a distinguished visiting professor after the end of her three terms as IPC. Cavoukian was appointed executive director of the Ryerson's Privacy and Big Data Institute in 2014. Since 2017, Cavoukian has been the Distinguished Expert-in-Residence of the university's Privacy by Design Centre of Excellence.

== Early life and career ==
Cavoukian was born in Cairo, Egypt in 1952 to ethnic Armenian parents Artin and Lucie Cavoukian, and immigrated to Toronto with her family in 1958. She is the sister of Canadian children's entertainer Raffi and photographer Cavouk Cavoukian.

She holds a B.A. from York University and received an MA and Ph.D in psychology from the University of Toronto, where she specialized in criminology and law.

In the 1980s, she headed the Research Services Branch for the provincial Attorney General.

She joined the Ontario provincial Office of the Information and Privacy Commissioner in 1987. Cavoukian served as its first Director of Compliance followed by her appointment as Assistant Commissioner in 1990.

== Tenure as Privacy Commissioner ==
She was initially appointed commissioner in 1997, and is the first Information and Privacy Commissioner (IPC) of Ontario to have been re-appointed for a third term. Serving as an officer of the provincial legislature, the commissioner is independent of the government of the day.

=== Adoption disclosure ===
On March 29, 2005, Commissioner Cavoukian spoke out against the adoption disclosure Bill 183, Adoption Information Disclosure Act, stating that the proposed law needed an amendment giving birth parents and adoptees from adoptions that occurred prior to the passing of this retroactive law the right, if desired, to file a disclosure veto to prevent the opening of their sealed files.

The Adoption Information Disclosure Act received Royal Assent on November 3, 2005, without Commissioner Cavoukian's proposed disclosure veto.

On September 19, 2007, Justice Belobaba, of the Ontario Superior Court of Justice ruled the Adoption Information Disclosure Act as unconstitutional – it breached section 7 of the Canadian Charter of Rights and Freedoms and thus, the sections of the Act relating to access to birth registration information are invalid.

On November 14, 2007, the government of Ontario introduced new adoption legislation that includes both a disclosure veto for adoptees and birth parents in adoptions that have already taken place and also promotes openness for adoptions where a disclosure veto is not registered and for all future adoptions. The Access to Adoption Records Act includes both a disclosure veto for adoptees and birth parents in adoptions that have already taken place.

=== Personal Health Information Protection Act ===
On November 1, 2004, Personal Health Information Protection Act (PHIPA) took effect granting the province of Ontario its first health information privacy legislation governing the collection, use and disclosure of personal health information. Cavoukian had been an advocate of this legislation since the office of the IPC was first formed in 1987.

The IPC became the oversight agency for the new law. As of November 1, 2004 patients who are denied access to their own personal health records, or who believe that their personal health information was collected, used or disclosed contrary to the new legislation, can complain to the IPC.

During her tenure, Cavoukian issued eleven Health Orders under PHIPA.

=== Privacy by Design ===
Cavoukian created the concept of Privacy by Design. In 2010 the annual assembly of International Data Protection and Privacy Commissioners unanimously passed a resolution recognizing privacy by design as an essential component of fundamental privacy protection. Privacy by design later became a core part of the European Union GDPR regulations.

=== Toronto Transit Commission surveillance cameras ===
In November 2007, the Toronto Transit Commission (TTC) announced plans to expand its video surveillance program, which resulted in a formal complaint to Commissioner Cavoukian from Privacy International, a U.K.-based organization, citing concerns that the TTC's proposed expansion was a violation of privacy laws. In response to this complaint, Cavoukian launched an investigation where she ruled that the TTC's expansion of its video surveillance system did not contravene any applicable privacy laws. As part of her investigation, she made 13 recommendations to the TTC, which were all implemented. She also encouraged the TTC to conduct a pilot project to test the use of a privacy-enhancing video surveillance technology developed by researchers at the University of Toronto.

== Recent Activity ==
Cavoukian was awarded an honorary LL.D by the University of Guelph at the Fall 2014 convocation.

She was hired by Ryerson University (now Toronto Metropolitan University) as a distinguished visiting professor after the end of her three terms as IPC. Cavoukian was appointed executive director of the university's Privacy and Big Data Institute in 2014.

Since 2017, Cavoukian has been the Distinguished Expert-in-Residence of the university's Privacy by Design Centre of Excellence.

=== Resignation from Sidewalk Labs-WATERFRONToronto Project ===
In 2017, Sidewalk Labs, a subsidiary of Alphabet Inc. (parent company of Google LLC), partnered with Waterfront Toronto to begin developing a smart city area in the 12 acre sector called Quayside. The project was heralded as a premier example that "would develop a whole new district of Toronto as a working model of a new type of smart city". Sidewalk Labs touted the Quayside Project as "an experimental urban neighbourhood 'from the internet up'". The project was occurring within the larger context of the Smart Cities Challenge, a competition for $80 million in Canadian government funding, although it was not seeking funding under the competition.

The proposed Sidewalk Labs development raised concerns around the breadth and depth of information collected under the project's umbrella. "Quayside may be one of the most sensor-laden neighbourhoods [proposed] in North America...It's being imagined as the sort of place where garbage cans and recycling bins can keep track of when and how often they're used, environmental probes can measure noise and pollution over time and cameras can collect data to model and improve the flow of cars, people, buses and bikes throughout the day". It was noted that "Access to those systems and the use of that data, in this private-public partnership, will raise novel policy questions for governments about privacy and governance.”

As the project was seen as a potential standard-setting benchmark in the development of smart cities worldwide, researchers raised concerns about the value of the data collected by Alphabet in the course of the project and how that value might be negotiated with the City of Toronto- as well as the ways that data would be collected and managed. These issues were acknowledged by Waterfront Toronto's board of directors in March 2018: "Privacy, data governance, cyber security and the ethical use of technology are complex questions which need to be addressed in a robust way to ensure that the Sidewalk Toronto initiative progresses in a way that encourages innovation while preserving the public good". The Board of Directors committed to "ensuring that the corporation has a robust team of independent advisors to ensure the protection of individual privacy rights for those who live, learn, work and visit within the new neighborhood". As part of that commitment, Ann Cavoukian was retained by Sidewalks Lab "to advise them on their privacy framework, and they have made a commitment to approaching all of their solutions with Privacy by Design at their foundation".

By October 2018, Cavoukian resigned from the Sidewalk Labs citing concerns that the project was not consistent with her widely respected "Privacy by Design" principles. While initially assured by Sidewalk Labs that they would de-identify all collected data at the source, Cavoukian was told at an October 15, 2018 meeting that Sidewalk Labs could not force the additional third parties involved in the data collection to similarly commit to de-identify data collected at the source. The de-identification of data at source was significant according to Cavoukian because "the smart city will likely be filled with sensors and other devices that will collect information 24/7, but their pervasiveness will make it to difficult to get consent from every person whose data is being collected". Cavoukian stated, “When I heard that, I said, 'I’m sorry. I can’t support this. I have to resign because you committed to embedding privacy by design into every aspect of your operation'.” Her letter of resignation stated "I imagined us creating a smart city of privacy, as opposed to a smart city of surveillance".

Cavoukian met with Waterfront Toronto on November 5, 2018, to call for the immediate de-identification of data at the source and to express her willingness to continue working with the organization. Cavoukian stated, “We don’t want people worrying about where they’re coming and going. We certainly don’t want a city of surveillance. That’s not on.”

=== 2019 ITAC Smart Cities Technology Summit ===
Cavoukian participated in a panel discussion at the 2019 ITAC Smart Cities Technology Summit in Brampton, Ontario. At one point, she said:

I’m not the only one who talks about the concern for privacy in smart cities. I’m on the International Council of Smart Cities and I assure you, most of the smart cities that are emerging are becoming cities of surveillance, not of privacy.

== Works ==
Cavoukian published two books on privacy with co-authors:

- Tyler Hamilton: The Privacy Payoff: How Successful Businesses Build Customer Trust, 2002.
- Don Tapscott: Who Knows: Safeguarding Your Privacy in a Networked World, 1997.

== Awards ==
- 2014 – Top 50 Power List (Maclean's Magazine)
- 2014 – Power 50 (Canadian Business Magazine)
- 2014 – Award of Distinction (Corporate Knights)
- 2014 – KuppingerCole Lifetime Achievement Award (European Identity & Cloud Conference)
- 2011 – Top 25 Women of Influence (Women of Influence Inc.)
- 2011 – Information Access and Protection of Privacy Award (University of Alberta)
- 2011 – Privacy Professional of the Year (SC Congress)
- 2011 – Kristian Beckman Award (IFIP)
- 2008 – Privacy Hero and Leadership Award (WiredSafety)
- 2007 – Top 100 most powerful women in Canada (Women's Executive Network)
- 2007 – Dr. Barbara Wand Award (Ontario Psychological Association)
- 2006 – Outstanding contribution to the protection of privacy rights in Ontario (Ontario Bar Association)
- 2006 – IABC All-Star speaker (International Association of Business Communicators)
- 2005 – Privacy Innovation Award (International Association of Privacy Professionals)
- 2003 – Privacy Manager of the Year (Privacy Manager Magazine)

== Memberships and affiliations ==
- Chair, IPSI Advisory Board
- International Biometric Advisory Council
- IBM Privacy Management Council
- Judge, FairWarning Privacy Excellence Awards
- European Association for Biometrics Advisory Board (EABAC)
- Future of Privacy Forum
- RIM Council
- Distinguished Fellow of the Ponemon Institute
- Women of Influence
