= The Georgetown Boys =

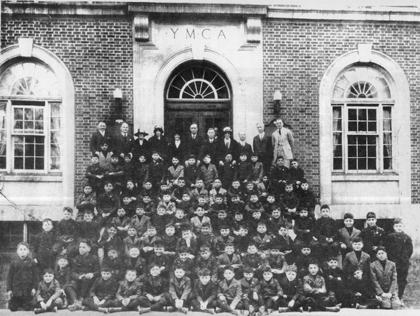
A group of the Georgetown Boys.

The Georgetown Boys, or Canada's Noble Experiment, was the first humanitarian act on an international scale by the country. This effort was spearheaded by the Armenian Relief Association of Canada. At this time Canada started to take in orphaned children from the Middle East. The first 50 came in 1923. The following year another 40 boys came. The boys came to Canada from the Middle East after they had been orphaned during the Armenian genocide. By the end of the project, a total of 110 came to Georgetown, Ontario, and eventually came to be called the Georgetown Boys.

The Armenian orphans lived, worked and were educated on Cedarvale Farm near Georgetown. The boys were largely trained for farming. The assistant superintendent at the school during this time was Aris Alexanian. Mr. Alexanian helped the boys start a newsletter called Ararat. The newsletter was written and published by the boys and used as a tool to improve their English skills. By 1927 a total of 91 of the original boys were placed on farms throughout Ontario. By 1928, most of the orphans originally at the farm had homes on farms. The majority became Canadian citizens.

In 1929 the farm home of the boys was renamed the Cedarvale School for Girls. In addition to boys, about 40 girls and women were taken in by the Canadian government. The original farm is now part of Cedarvale Park in Halton Hills. An Ontario Provincial Plaque was erected in Cedarvale Park on June 26, 2010, designating it a municipal historic site honouring the Armenian boys who lived there. An Ontario Heritage Trust plaque was added in 2011.

== In media ==
=== Books ===
A comprehensive book on the life of the Armenian orphans in Georgetown was written by Jack Apramian in 1976. "The Georgetown Boys" is written in the first person since Apramian himself was a Georgetown Boy who arrived with the first group in 1923. The Armenian children retained some of their Armenian heritage while facing pressure to assimilate. Jack Apramian's original self-published book was revised by Lorne Shirinian (including the addition of some mistakes) and republished by the Zoryan Institute in 2009.

Aram's Choice, a children's book written by Marsha Forchuk Skrypuch and illustrated by Muriel Wood, was published in 2006 by Fitzhenry & Whiteside Canada. This was the first work of commercial fiction on the subject of the Georgetown Boys. This illustrated chapter book follows the journey of the first group of boys from their exile in Corfu all the way to the Georgetown Boys' Farm. In 2009, the sequel, Call Me Aram, also written by Marsha Forchuk Skrypuch and illustrated by Muriel Wood was published. This book was about the Boys' first few months in Canada and their quest to retain their own Armenian names. Both of these books received high critical acclaim. Aram's Choice was shortlisted for the Canadian Library Association Children's Book of the Year Award, as well as the Ontario Library Association's Silver Birch Express Award and their Golden Oak Award. Call Me Aram was also shortlisted for the Silver Birch Express and Golden Oak.

=== Theatre ===
A play based on Marsha Forchuk Skrypuch's Aram books, called "The Georgetown Boys" premiered at the John Elliot Theatre in Georgetown in 2008. Superintendent Aris Alexanian is one of the characters in the play. The play was written, directed and produced by Sam Hancock. There is also a musical entitled "The Georgetown Boys: A Musical" which performed at The John F. Kennedy Center for the Performing Arts In April 2009.

=== Film ===
A half hour documentary film, ‘The Georgetown Boys’ (available on youtube) was produced in 1987, written & directed by Dorothy Craig-Manoukian, camerawork, Peter Mettler & sound by Atom Egoyan. Post production work was done with the assistance of facilities at the National Film Board in Montréal.

The film tells the story of how the boys were brought to Canada. Early 1920’s attitudes to refugees, immigration policies, loss of identity & child labour exploitation are exposed through archival material & accounts of the boys, then, & sixty years later, at a reunion held at the old farm home. The film also covers an Armenian baptism & an annual cultural event at a Toronto Armenian community centre.

The film was distributed by the Canadian Filmmakers Distribution Centre to schools & libraries in Ontario & was screened at various international film festivals. It had received a special recommendation at the 1988 CIAFF (Canadian International Annual Film Festival). TV Ontario aired the film frequently over a four year period.
