= Cedarvale Park =

Park in Georgetown, Ontario, Canada

Coordinates: 43.6461°N 79.9178°W

Cedarvale Park is a municipal park located at 181-185 Main St. S. Georgetown, Ontario—a short walk from downtown. It is a multi-use facility, open year-round.

== Facilities ==
- Official Size Soccer Field
- Four Mini Soccer Fields
- Toboggan Hills
- Hiking Trails
- Riverside Benches
- Barbecues
- First Aid Station
- Children's Playground

Cedarvale Park was home to the orphaned Armenian boys brought to Georgetown in 1923.

Scott McLaughlin, a native of Scotland, emigrated to Canada and settled in Glen Williams. In the 1870s McLaughlin purchased 80 hectares of land on the southeast limits of the village of Georgetown and called it Cedar Vale Farm. Michael, Scott and Rachel McLaughlin's youngest child, born in 1886, first worked as a teller at the Bank of Hamilton (now the Old Bank on Main Street Georgetown). Michael quit in 1923 when the Armenian Relief Association of Canada purchased a large portion of the property for Armenian orphaned boys. The Georgetown Boys were part of a rescue operation for refugees from the Armenian genocide in the 1920s. The Georgetown Boys Farm was located in what is now Cedarvale Park. That area was later purchased by the Town of Georgetown as a centennial project and is now known as Cedarvale Park. An Ontario Provincial Plaque was erected in Cedarvale Park on June 26, 2010, designating it a municipal historic site honouring the Armenian boys who lived there.

== Things To Do ==
=== Classics Against Cancer ===
This one-day event showcases the classic cars from the surrounding area. It takes place on Father's Day each year. A donation to the Cancer Assistance Services of Halton Hills is requested when entering the park.

=== Soccer ===
Every weekday throughout the summer months, the best in Georgetown soccer action comes to Cedarvale. There are many games held each week, and they provide excellent entertainment. Fields are open to the public when games are not scheduled.

=== Children's Playground ===
A newly installed plastic playground for children.

=== Hiking Trail ===
The trail in Cedarvale forms a loop. It begins at the parking area where there is a set of wooden stairs. It dips and curves through the forest, and then curves down a fairly large hill. It continues up a large hill, and then wraps around the highest hill, where you can see the entire park and beyond. The trail finishes with a large downhill curve, leading to the playground.

=== Toboggan Hill ===
Open in the winter, and lit by a very bright light at night. Toboggan Run is one of Georgetown's winter highlights.
