= Information and Privacy Commissioner of Ontario =

- Commissaire à l’information et à la protection de la vie privée de l'Ontario

Office overview
- Formed: January 1, 1988
- Headquarters: 2 Bloor St. E., Suite 1400 Toronto, Ontario
- Office executive: Patricia Kosseim, Commissioner
- Website: www.ipc.on.ca

The Information and Privacy Commissioner of Ontario (IPC; French: Commissaire à l’information et à la protection de la vie privée de l'Ontario) was established as an officer of the Legislature by Ontario's Freedom of Information and Protection of Privacy Act (FIPPA), which came into effect on January 1, 1988. The current commissioner is Patricia Kosseim.

== Mandate ==
The commissioner is appointed by and reports to the Legislative Assembly of Ontario, and is independent of the government of the day. The function of the office is to uphold and promote open government and the protection of personal privacy in Ontario. The IPC also has responsibility for the Municipal Freedom of Information and Protection of Privacy Act (MFIPPA) and the Personal Health Information Protection Act, 2004 (PHIPA).

Together, these three Acts establish rules about how the institutions covered may collect, use, and disclose personal data. They also establish a right of access that enables individuals to request their own personal information and have it corrected if necessary.

The term "freedom of information" refers to public access to general records relating to the activities of government. This ranges from administration and operations to legislation and policy. It is an important aspect of open and accountable government. Privacy protection is the other side of that equation, and refers to the safeguarding of personal information held by government.

Under the three acts and statutory mandate, the IPC is responsible for:

- Resolving access to information appeals and complaints when government or health care practitioners and organizations refuse to grant requests for access or correction;
- Investigating privacy complaints with respect to personal information held by government or health care practitioners and organizations;
- Ensuring that the government organizations and health information custodians comply with the provisions of the Acts;
- Educating the public about Ontario's access and privacy laws;
- Conducting research on access and privacy issues, and providing advice and comment on proposed government legislation and programs.

== History ==
Following the passage of the Freedom of Information and Protection of Privacy Act, the IPC office was created with three staff under the first Commissioner, Sidney B. Linden.

FIPPA applies to all provincial ministries and most provincial agencies, boards and commissions, as well as to universities and colleges of applied arts and technology.

Hospitals were brought under the Freedom of Information and Protection of Privacy Act in January, 2012 to ensure greater transparency and accountability. Like other institutions covered by FIPPA, hospitals are required to make an annual report to the IPC.

MFIPPA broadened the number of public institutions covered by Ontario’s freedom of information and privacy legislation. It covers local government organizations, such as municipalities, police, library, health and school boards, and transit commissions.

After years of advocacy, a Personal Health Information Protection Act (PHIPA) was enacted in 2004. This health privacy law applied to all individuals and organizations involved in the delivery of health care services – both public and private sectors – to ensure the protection of personal health information of patients. In the first seven years after its enactment, IPC issued only 11 health Orders.

In accordance with the Acts, the Commissioner has delegated some decision-making powers to staff members. Thus, the Assistant Commissioner (Privacy), Assistant Commissioner (Access) and other designated staff may issue orders, resolve appeals, and investigate privacy complaints.

== Commissioners ==
Name	Term
Sidney B. Linden	1988–1991
Tom Wright	1991–1997
Ann Cavoukian	1997–2014
Brian Beamish	2014–2020
Patricia Kosseim	2020-Present

== See also ==
- Privacy Commissioner of Canada
