= Ethnic origins of people in Canada =

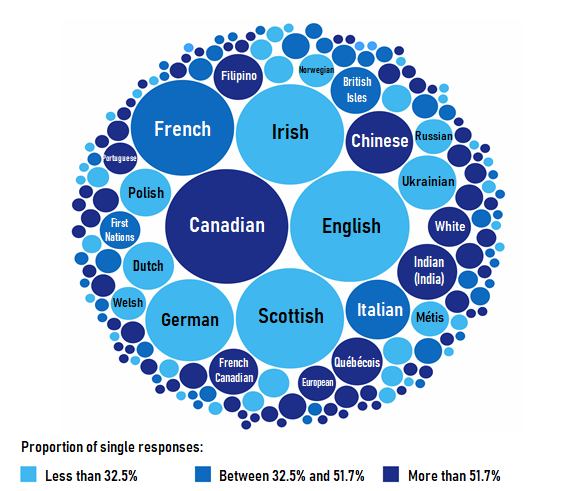
The top 168 ethnic or cultural origins self-reported by Canadians in the 2021 census

According to the 2021 Canadian census, over 450 "ethnic or cultural origins" were self-reported by Canadians. The major panethnic groups chosen were: European (52.5 percent), North American (22.9 percent), Asian (19.3 percent), North American Indigenous (6.1 percent), African (3.8 percent), Latin, Central and South American (2.5 percent), Caribbean (2.1 percent), Oceanian (0.3 percent), and other (6 percent). Over 60 percent of Canadians reported a single origin, and 36 percent reported having multiple ethnic origins, thus the overall total is greater than 100 percent.

The country's ten largest self-reported ethnic or cultural origins in 2021 were Canadian (Note: All citizens of Canada are classified as "Canadians" as defined by Canada's nationality laws. "Canadian" as an ethnic group has since 1996 been added to census questionnaires for possible ancestral origin or descent. "Canadian" was included as an example on the English questionnaire and "Canadien" as an example on the French questionnaire. "The majority of respondents to this selection are from the eastern part of the country that was first settled. Respondents generally are visibly European (Anglophones and Francophones) and no longer self-identify with their ethnic ancestral origins. This response is attributed to a multitude or generational distance from ancestral lineage.") (accounting for 15.6 percent of the population), followed by English (14.7 percent), Irish (12.1 percent), Scottish (12.1 percent), French (11.0 percent), German (8.1 percent), Chinese (4.7 percent), Italian (4.3 percent), Indian (3.7 percent), and Ukrainian (3.5 percent).

Of the 36.3 million people enumerated in 2021, approximately 25.4 million reported being "White", representing 69.8 percent of the population. The Indigenous population representing 5 percent or 1.8 million people, grew by 9.4 percent compared to the non-Indigenous population, which grew by 5.3 percent from 2016 to 2021. One out of every four Canadians or 26.5 percent of the population belonged to a non-White and non-Indigenous visible minority, (Note: Indigenous peoples are not considered a visible minority in Statistics Canada calculations. Visible minorities are defined by Statistics Canada as "persons, other than Aboriginal peoples, who are non-Caucasian in race or non-white in colour".) the largest of which in 2021 were South Asian (2.6 million people; 7.1 percent), Chinese (1.7 million; 4.7 percent), Black (1.5 million; 4.3 percent), Filipinos (960,000 2.6 percent), Arabs (690,000; 1.9 percent), Latin Americans (580,000; 1.6 percent), Southeast Asians (390,000; 1.1 percent), West Asians (360,000; 1.0 percent), Koreans (220,000; 0.6 percent) and Japanese (99,000; 0.3 percent).

Between 2011 and 2016, the visible minority population rose by 18.4 percent. In 1961, about 300,000 people, less than two percent of Canada's population, were members of visible minority groups. The 2021 census indicated that 8.3 million people, or almost one-quarter (23.0 percent) of the population, reported themselves as being or having been a landed immigrant or permanent resident in Canada—above the 1921 census previous record of 22.3 percent. In 2021, India, China, and the Philippines were the top three countries of origin for immigrants moving to Canada.

== Statistics Canada report on race and ethnicity in Canada in 2022 ==
The 2020 General Social Survey revealed that 92% of adult Canadians said that "[ethnic] diversity is a Canadian value". Over 25% of Canadians were "racialized". By 2041, it is estimated that racialized Canadians will comprise 40% of the population. In 2021, 23% of the Canadian population were immigrants—the "largest proportion since Confederation", according to Statistics Canada. Prior to the early 1970s, most new Canadians came from Europe. Since then, more immigrants have come from Asia, the Middle East, and Africa. In 2021, most immigrants came from Asia, which includes the Middle East.

== Data collection method ==
Listed below are the ethnic groups of Canadian residents (citizens, landed immigrants and non-citizen temporary residents) as self-identified in the 2016 census in which approximately 35,151,000 census forms were completed). The relevant census question asked for "the ethnic or cultural origins" of the respondent's ancestors and not the respondents themselves. As data were collected by self-declaration, ethnic groups may not necessarily correspond to the true ancestry of respondents. Many respondents acknowledged multiple ancestries. These people were added to the "multiple origin" total for each origin listed. These include responses as varied as a respondent who listed eight different origins and a respondent who answered "French Canadian" (leading to them being counted once for "French" and once for "Canadian"). As with all self-reported data, understanding of the question may have varied from respondent to respondent.

== Larger ethnic origins (200,000 or more individuals per group; 2021 census) ==
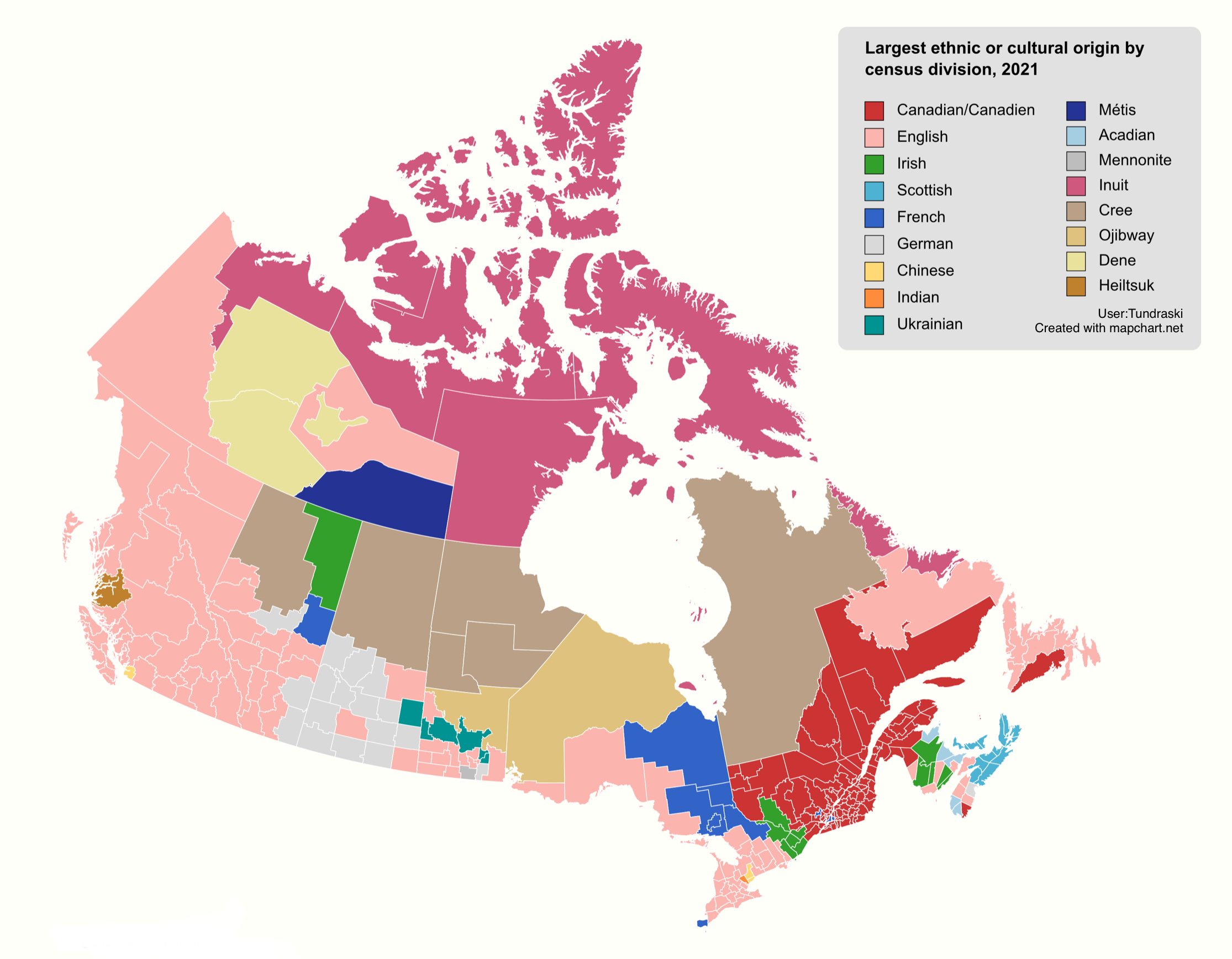
A map showing the largest ethnic or cultural origins in Canada by census division in 2021.
Canadian/Canadien English Irish Scottish French German Chinese Indian Ukrainian	Métis Acadian Mennonite Inuit Cree Ojibway Dene Heiltsuk

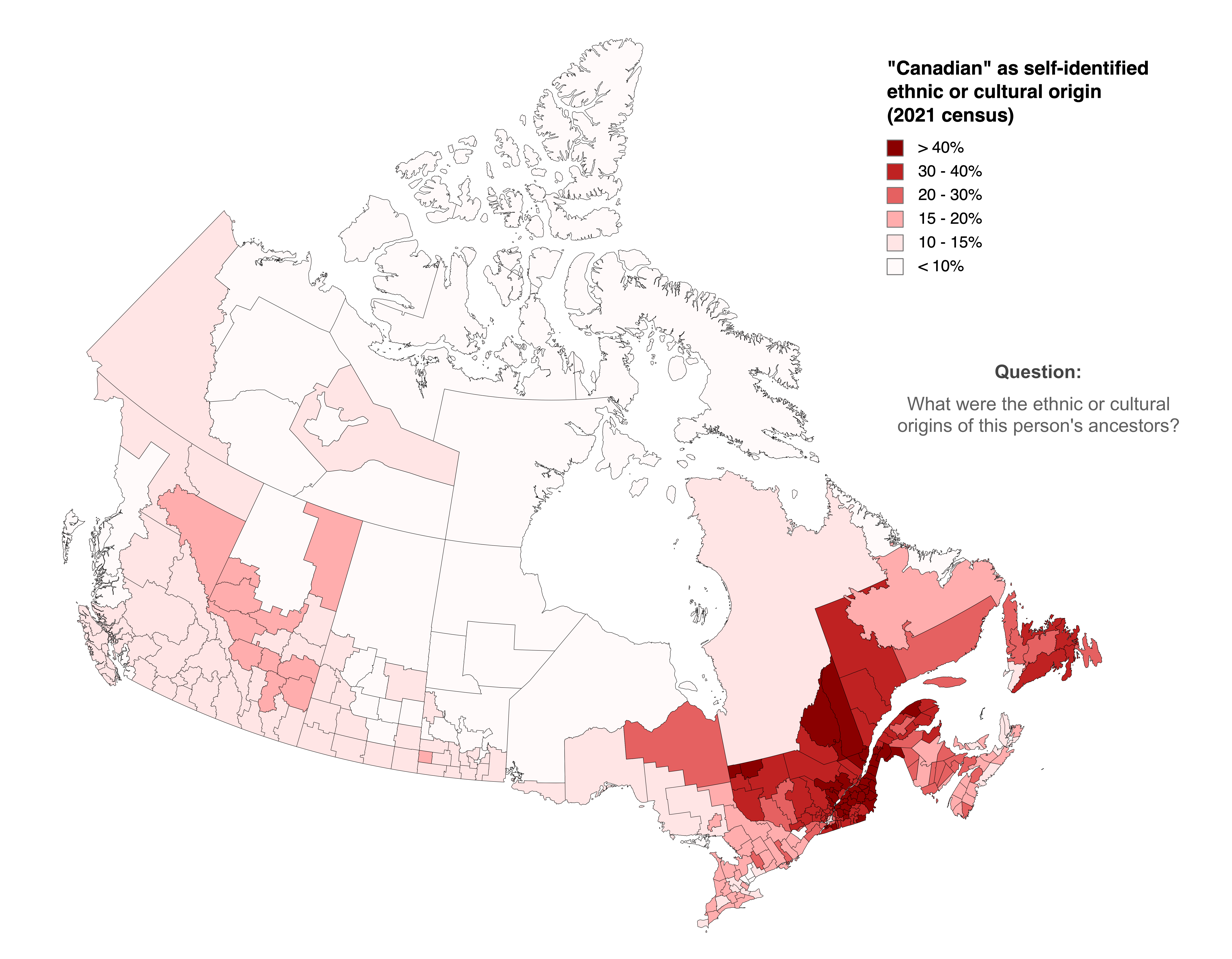
"Canadian" was the most common ethnic or cultural origin reported in the 2021 census.

Ethnicity	Total responses	As single response	One of multiple responses
Canadian	5,677,205	4,186,835	1,490,370
English	5,322,825	1,350,050	4,188,780
Irish	4,413,120	593,860	3,819,255
Scottish	4,392,200	559,575	3,832,630
French	3,985,945	1,515,050	2,470,895
German	2,955,695	508,180	2,447,520
Chinese	1,713,870	1,372,215	341,655
Italian	1,546,390	671,510	874,880
First Nations (Note: The category "North American Indian" includes respondents who indicated that their ethnic origins were from a Canadian First Nation, or another non-Canadian North American aboriginal group (excluding Inuit and Métis). Source: "How Statistics Canada Identifies Aboriginal Peoples". Statistics Canada.)	1,426,950	645,105	781,845
Indian	1,347,715	976,355	371,365
Ukrainian	1,258,635	273,210	985,425
Dutch	988,585	278,830	709,760
Polish	982,815	238,710	744,110
British Isles, not otherwise specified	938,950	417,170	521,780
Filipino	925,490	741,980	183,505
French Canadian	906,315	589,855	316,460
Métis	600,000	91,255	508,740
Russian	548,145	116,605	431,540
Norwegian	466,495	41,280	425,215
Welsh	455,725	35,685	420,040
Portuguese	448,305	238,635	209,670
American	353,495	49,680	303,820
Spanish	342,045	70,030	272,010
Swedish	334,505	23,710	310,795
Hungarian (Magyar)	320,155	75,870	244,285
Acadian	305,170	125,565	179,600
Pakistani	303,260	217,650	85,615
African, not otherwise specified	301,955	177,565	124,395
Israeli	282,015	113,140	168,870
Punjabi	279,950	164,690	115,260
Vietnamese	275,530	193,585	81,945
Arab, not otherwise specified	263,710	171,400	92,310
Greek	262,135	134,820	127,315
Jamaican	249,070	123,595	125,480
Korean	217,650	191,655	25,995
Romanian	215,885	90,755	125,130
Lebanese	210,605	118,185	92,420
Iranian	200,465	157,475	42,985

== Smaller ethnic origins (2021 census) ==
Ethnicity	Total responses	Men	Women
Christian, not included elsewhere	200,340	99,800	100,540
Danish	196,945	96,220	74,575
North American Indigenous, not otherwise specified	194,840	94,035	100,810
Sikh	194,640	101,250	93,385
Austrian	189,535	92,740	96,800
Belgian	182,175	90,150	92,030
Haitian	178,990	84,510	94,490
Hindu	166,160	87,665	78,495
Mexican	155,499	77,435	78,055
Mennonites	155,095	77,735	77,360
Swiss	145,570	72,015	73,555
Finnish	144,055	69,270	74,785
Sri Lankan	132,410	65,170	67,240
Croatian	130,820	64,915	65,905
Japanese	129,425	56,850	72,580
South Asian, not included elsewhere	120,125	60,575	59,955
Northern European, not otherwise specified	110,735	54,730	56,005
Egyptian	105,245	55,230	50,020
Latin, Central or South American, not included elsewhere	104,765	51,375	53,395
Tamil	102,170	51,165	51,005
Icelandic	101,990	50,370	51,620
Colombian	100,555	47,995	52,560
Moroccan	99,980	50,835	49,150
Czech	98,925	47,495	51,430
Syrian	98,250	49,385	48,865
Guyanese	97,210	46,270	50,940
Afghan	96,810	48,255	48,550
Black, not otherwise specified	94,585	44,335	50,250
Serbian	93,360	46,945	48,865
Ojibwe	92,220	44,610	47,600
Newfoundlander	91,670	45,665	46,005
Hong Kongers	81,680	39,485	42,195
Trinidadian/Tobagonian	77,405	37,655	39,750
Turk	76,745	39,955	36,795
Inuit, not otherwise specified	76,675	37,315	39,365
Bangladeshi	75,425	39,085	36,335
Algerian	73,770	38,035	35,740
Brazilian	71,755	34,670	37,085
Nigerian	69,540	34,680	34,860
Armenian	68,850	34,105	34,745
Slovak	68,210	33,475	34,740
Eastern European, not otherwise specified	67,780	31,525	33,995
Somali	65,555	31,555	33,995
Taiwanese	64,020	29,280	34,740
Iraqi	59,300	29,865	29,435
Salvadorean	59,280	29,150	30,130
Black Caribbean	59,050	26,385	32,670
East and Southeast Asian, not otherwise specified	58,870	27,845	31,025
West or Central Asian or Middle Eastern, not otherwise specified	58,840	30,560	28,280
Caribbean, not otherwise specified	57,195	25,715	31,475
Algonqin	56,070	27,025	29,040
West Indian, not otherwise specified	58,840	30,560	28,280
Lithuanian	52,040	24,510	27,530
South African	49,840	24,885	24,955
Australian	46,765	24,165	22,595
Palestinian	45,905	23,930	21,975
Chilean	45,190	18,685	26,510
Congolese	45,260	22,000	23,260
Nova Scotia	44,720	21,700	23,025
Ethiopian	42,545	20,675	21,875
Peruvian	42,295	19,925	22,370
Cambodian	41,950	19,835	22,115
Berber	41,700	22,325	19,370
Maltese	40,670	20,210	20,455
Slovenian	40,470	13,690	26,78
Macedonian	39,440	19,500	19,940
Yugoslav not included elsewhere	38,480	8,570	29,91
Barbadian	37,775	11,605	26,170
Gujarati	36,970	15,720	21,245
Albanian	36,185	28,425	7,760
Ghanaian	35,495	26,535	8,960
Bulgarian	34,560	19,965	14,595
Czechoslovak, not otherwise specified	33,135	15,355	17,775
Latvian	30,725	7,040	23,685
Cuban	29,065	10,040	19,030
Israeli	28,740	6,450	22,280
Bosnian	26,740	15,610	11,125
Venezuelan	26,345	10,305	16,040
Guatemalan	26,270	13,905	12,370
Tunisian	25,650	17,620	8,030
Ecuadorian	25,410	13,925	11,485
Eritrean	25,255	20,625	4,630
Cameroonian	24,615	20,605	4,010
Laotian	24,580	13,375	11,205
Estonian	24,530	6,155	18,375
Dominican	23,130	9,930	13,200
Bengali	22,905	18,435	4,470
Aboriginal from Central/South America	22,720	2,080	20,645
Indonesian	21,395	4,775	16,615
Belarusian	20,710	5,125	15,585
Argentinian	20,680	4,165	16,510
Sudanese	19,960	15,250	4,710
Fijian	19,370	8,270	11,105
Thai	19,005	7,740	11,265
Grenadian	17,915	7,515	10,400
Vincentian/Grenadinian	17,425	7,245	10,180
East African	17,305	7,220	10,085
Nepali	17,135	13,695	3,440
Malaysian	16,920	2,555	14,365
Kurdish	16,320	10,470	5,845
New Zealander	15,395	1,300	14,095
Central and West African origins, not included elsewhere	15,380	7,800	7,585
Moldovan	14,915	7,415	7,505
Jordanian	14,250	7,955	6,295
Assyrian	13,830	8,870	4,960
Nicaraguan	13,705	6,360	7,350
Breton	11,845	3,230	8,615
Flemish	11,685	1,485	10,200
Hispanic	11,050	5,660	5,395
Burundian	10,990	8,965	2,025
Ivoirean	10,935	7,795	3,140
Kenyan	10,915	5,445	5,465
Rwandan	10,775	8,080	2,690
Honduran	10,650	5,325	5,325
Senegalese	10,175	6,490	3,685
Yoruba	9,585	6,870	2,715
Burmese	9,335	4,660	4,675
Mauritanian	9,325	3,520	5,805
St. Lucian	8,985	4,040	4,945
Zimbabwean	8,090	4,945	3,140
Tibetan	8,040	7,015	1,030
Libyan	7,745	5,755	1,985
Mongolian	7,480	2,555	4,925
Sinhalese	7,285	4,355	2,930
Guinean	7,240	4,705	2,540
Basque	6,970	715	6,250
Sicilian	6,940	1,345	5,600
Saudi Arabian	6,810	4,200	2,615
Uruguayan	6,795	1,810	4,985
Yemeni	6,640	2,940	3,700
East or Southeast Asian, not included elsewhere	6,505	4,235	2,270
Azerbaijani	6,425	2,280	4,145
Maya	6,290	1,180	5,105
Manx	6,125	285	5,845
North African, not included elsewhere	6,115	2,905	3,210
Goan	6,070	2,040	4,030
Ugandan	5,705	3,245	2,460
Cypriot	5,650	1,265	4,385
Costa Rican	5,535	2,140	3,395
Igbo	5,320	3,475	1,845
Togolese	5,300	3,095	2,205
Bolivian	5,055	1,890	3,160
Beninese	4,990	2,650	2,340
Slavic, not otherwise specified	4,870	1,470	3,400
Tatar	4,825	880	3,940
Pashtun	4,810	2,245	2,565
Georgian	4,775	1,900	2,875
Yakut	4,761	1,886	2,875
Tanzanian	4,710	1,835	2,875
Panamanian	4,700	1,090	3,610
Roma (Gypsy)	4,630	745	3,895
Frisian	4,590	795	3,790
Karen	4,515	3,835	680
Antiguan	4,505	1,275	3,225
Malagasy	4,500	2,155	2,345
Malian	4,485	2,310	2,180
Paraguayan	4,325	670	3,660
Montenegrin	4,165	915	3,245
Bantu, not otherwise specified	3,965	2,315	1,645
Uzbek	3,920	1,730	2,190
Luxembourger	3,915	440	3,475
Bahamian	3,670	810	2,860
Bhutanese	3,600	2,440	1,160
Channel Islander	3,590	435	3,155
Coptic	3,535	1,490	2,040
Puerto Rican	3,410	445	2,960
Western European origins, not included elsewhere	3,370	840	2,530
Oromo	3,355	2,410	945
Kazakh	3,325	1,465	1,860
Hawaiian	3,295	120	3,175
Burkinabe	3,155	1,980	1,165
Kashmiri	3,115	1,095	2,020
Bermudan	3,075	310	2,765
Carib	3,035	130	2,905
Angolan	2,955	1,140	1,820
Kittitian/Nevisian	2,920	750	2,165
Tajik	2,910	1,240	1,665
Kosovar	2,870	1,710	1,160
Singaporean	2,850	495	2,355
Alsatian	2,800	375	2,425
Sierra Leonean	2,620	1,580	1,040
Maori	2,500	155	2,345
Liberian	2,485	1,520	965
Peulh	2,440	1,425	1,015
Pacific Islands origins, not included elsewhere	2,335	470	1,865
Kuwaiti	2,235	1,080	1,155
Southern European origins, not included elsewhere	2,165	440	1,730
Tigrian	2,155	1,340	810
Martinican	2,005	370	1,635
Cornish	1,970	120	1,855
Akan	1,955	1,235	720
Edo	1,945	1,180	765
Other North American origins, not included elsewhere	1,895	655	1,240
Afrikaner	1,870	280	1,595
Zambian	1,865	1,055	805
Chadian	1,845	1,185	655
Belizean	1,755	250	1,505
Corsican	1,750	165	1,590
Djiboutian	1,710	980	730
Ashanti	1,585	765	825
Uighur	1,555	1,010	540
Amhara	1,530	710	820
Samoan	1,530	150	1,375
Hazara	1,515	585	930
Arawak	1,440	55	1,385
Gabonese	1,405	595	820
Seychellois	1,285	575	710
Catalan	1,275	200	1,075
Maure	1,190	400	790
Guadeloupean	1,130	245	885
Malinké	1,120	675	455
Polynesian, not otherwise specified	1,105	90	1,015
Kyrgyz	1,060	580	475
Turkmen	1,040	390	655
Gambian	975	580	395
Zulu	945	285	660
Bavarian	940	50	890
Montserratian	935	190	745
Dinka	900	585	320
Ewe	845	320	525
Wolof	835	465	375
Hmong	810	585	220
Harari	660	395	265
Chechen	100	100	100

== Evolution from 1871 to 1921 ==
During the fifty-year period beginning from the first census of independent Canada in 1871 until the census of 1921, the national ethnic composition was multicultural, however in the early period was dominated by four origin groups from western and northern Europe: French, English, Irish, and Scottish. Following the French and British Isles origin groups, Continental European communities were the largest in Canada, and grew fairly rapidly between the 1901 census and the 1921 census. Nominally small East Asian, South Asian, West Asian, and West African descended communities also existed during this time period.

The ethnic French population, comprising a plurality of the total population from confederation until just prior to the 1921 census, overwhelmingly relied on natural increase for growth, with progeny stemming from early settlers who arrived throughout the 17th and 18th centuries; migration from France had been severely curtailed by the British Empire and early governments of independent Canada. Population growth amongst the French population occurred at relatively high pace, increasing from 1,082,940 persons in 1871 to 2,452,743 persons in 1921. Despite an increase of nearly 1.5 million persons during this fifty-year period, the French proportion of the total Canadian population dropped slightly, from 31.1 percent, to 27.1 percent.

By contrast, large population increases amongst the three main ethnic groups from the British Isles (English, Irish, and Scottish) occurred through natural increase but relied heavily on high immigration rates that began in the early-mid 19th century dubbed the Great Migration of Canada − this continued through the early 20th century, spurred by record immigration rates during the 1900s and 1910s, when English immigrants formed a majority or plurality of all immigrants to Canada on an annual and decadal basis.

The English population, in particular, grew at a rapid pace, increasing from 705,369 persons in 1871 to 2,545,358 persons in 1921, representing an increase of nearly 2 million persons during the fifty-year period. During the same time period, the English proportion of the total Canadian population rose from 20.3 percent to 29.0 percent. The English community experienced massive growth principally during the first two decades of the 20th century as a result of record immigration at the time; during the era, persons of English descent also became the single largest ethnic group in Canada, comprising a plurality of the Canadian population by the 1921 census.

The Irish population, meanwhile, witnessed steady, slowing population growth during the late 19th and early 20th century, with the proportion of the total Canadian population dropping from 24.3 percent in 1871 to 12.6 percent in 1921 and falling from the second-largest ethnic group in Canada from to fourth − principally due to massive immigration flows from England to Canada at the time − despite the population increasing from 846,414 persons to 1,107,803 persons in the fifty-year timeframe. The largest Irish population increases occurred prior to confederation, spurred by mass immigration during the mid-19th century at the height of the Great Migration of Canada, and was primarily due to The Great Famine and related poor economic conditions in Ireland at the time.

At the turn of the 20th century, overall immigrant proportions from the British Isles to Canada gradually dropped from a majority to a plurality. At the time, the federal government began supplementing increased mass immigration from the British Isles (mainly England) by also permitting large migration flows from continental Europe, especially Germany, Scandinavia, and the Soviet Union. This was primarily as a result of federal policy aimed at settling the Prairies through ethnic block settlements and ultimately led to the highest annual immigration rates in Canadian history since confederation in 1867 that remain unsurpassed in the contemporary era, including 1913 (new immigrants accounted for 5.3 percent of the total population), 1912 (5.1 percent), 1911 (4.6 percent), 1907 (4.3 percent) and 1910 (4.1 percent).

Largely due to increased immigration levels outside of the British Isles, the continental European population grew rapidly during the first two decades of the 20th century − comprising 1,246,151 persons or 14.2 percent as proportion of the total Canadian population by the 1921 census, representing a numerical increase of over 1 million persons from fifty years earlier in 1871, when the continental European population stood at approximately 236,043 persons or 6.8 percent of the total Canadian population.

Broadening the multicultural makeup of Canada, the diversity across the Prairie provinces during the early 20th century was soon dubbed a cultural mosaic by journalist Victoria Hayward in the early 1920s:

"New Canadians, representing many places and widely separated sections of Old Europe, have contributed to the Prairie Provinces a variety in the way of Church Architecture. Cupolas and domes distinctly Eastern, almost Turkish, startle one above the tops of Manitoba maples or the bush of the river banks. These architectural figures of the landscape, apart altogether of their religious significance, are centers where, crossing the threshold on Sundays, one has the opportunity of hearing Swedish music, or the rich, deep chanting of the Russian responses; and of viewing at close hand the artistry that goes to make up the interior appointments of these churches transplanted from the East to the West… It is indeed a mosaic of vast dimensions and great breadth, essayed of the Prairie."

Ethnic Origins of Canadians (1871−1921)
Ethnic Origin	1871		1881		1901		1911		1921	
Ethnic Origin	Pop.	%	Pop.	%	Pop.	%	Pop.	%	Pop.	%
French	1,082,940	31.07%	1,298,929	30.03%	1,649,371	30.71%	2,061,719	28.61%	2,452,743	27.91%
Irish	846,414	24.28%	957,403	22.14%	988,721	18.41%	1,074,738	14.91%	1,107,803	12.61%
English	706,369	20.26%	881,301	20.38%	1,260,899	23.47%	1,871,268	25.97%	2,545,358	28.96%
Scottish	549,946	15.78%	699,863	16.18%	800,154	14.9%	1,027,015	14.25%	1,173,625	13.35%
German	202,991	5.82%	254,319	5.88%	310,601	5.78%	403,417	5.6%	294,635	3.35%
Dutch	29,662	0.85%	30,412	0.7%	33,845	0.63%	55,961	0.78%	117,505	1.34%
Indigenous	23,037	0.66%	108,547	2.51%	127,941	2.38%	105,611	1.47%	114,083	1.3%
African	21,496	0.62%	21,394	0.49%	17,437	0.32%	16,994	0.24%	18,291	0.21%
Other; British	7,773	0.22%	9,947	0.23%	13,421	0.25%	26,060	0.36%	41,932	0.48%
Swiss	2,962	0.08%	—N/a	—N/a	3,866	0.07%	6,626	0.09%	12,837	0.15%
Scandinavian	1,623	0.05%	5,223	0.12%	31,042	0.58%	112,682	1.56%	167,369	1.9%
Italian	1,035	0.03%	1,849	0.04%	10,834	0.2%	45,963	0.64%	66,769	0.76%
Spanish− Portuguese	829	0.02%	—N/a	—N/a	—N/a	—N/a	—N/a	—N/a	2,695	0.03%
Russian	607	0.02%	1,227	0.03%	19,825	0.37%	44,376	0.62%	100,064	1.14%
Jewish	125	0.004%	667	0.02%	16,131	0.3%	76,199	1.06%	126,196	1.44%
Greek	39	0.001%	—N/a	—N/a	291	0.01%	3,614	0.05%	5,740	0.07%
Indian	11	0.0003%	—N/a	—N/a	100	0.002%	2,342	0.03%	1,018	0.01%
Chinese	—N/a	—N/a	4,383	0.1%	17,312	0.32%	27,831	0.39%	39,587	0.45%
Austrian	—N/a	—N/a	—N/a	—N/a	10,947	0.2%	44,036	0.61%	107,671	1.23%
Polish	—N/a	—N/a	—N/a	—N/a	6,285	0.12%	33,652	0.47%	53,403	0.61%
Ukrainian	—N/a	—N/a	—N/a	—N/a	5,682	0.11%	75,432	1.05%	108,721	1.24%
Japanese	—N/a	—N/a	—N/a	—N/a	4,738	0.09%	9,067	0.13%	15,868	0.18%
Belgian	—N/a	—N/a	—N/a	—N/a	2,994	0.06%	9,664	0.13%	20,234	0.23%
Finnish	—N/a	—N/a	—N/a	—N/a	2,502	0.05%	15,500	0.22%	21,494	0.24%
Syrian− Lebanese− Turkish− Armenian	—N/a	—N/a	—N/a	—N/a	1,681	0.03%	3,880	0.05%	9,260	0.11%
Hungarian	—N/a	—N/a	—N/a	—N/a	1,549	0.03%	11,648	0.16%	13,181	0.15%
Bulgarian− Romanian	—N/a	—N/a	—N/a	—N/a	334	0.01%	5,883	0.08%	15,235	0.17%
Czech− Slovak	—N/a	—N/a	—N/a	—N/a	—N/a	—N/a	—N/a	—N/a	8,840	0.1%
Yugoslav	—N/a	—N/a	—N/a	—N/a	—N/a	—N/a	—N/a	—N/a	3,906	0.04%
Lithuanian	—N/a	—N/a	—N/a	—N/a	—N/a	—N/a	—N/a	—N/a	1,970	0.02%
Other	7,902	0.23%	—N/a	—N/a	—N/a	—N/a	—N/a	—N/a	—N/a	—N/a
Canada	3,485,761	100%	4,324,810	100%	5,371,315	100%	7,206,643	100%	8,787,949	100%
Note: The figures for 1871 cover the four original provinces of Canada (Quebec, Ontario, Nova Scotia, and New Brunswick) only.

== Evolution from 1996 to 2016 ==
As regards total responses, Canadian is the most common ethnic origin (11,113,965) in the 2016 Census (see above). This was also the case in the 2011 NHS (10,563,805), 2006 Census (10,066,290), 2001 Census (11,682,680), and the 1996 Census (8,806,975). Canadian was also the most common single ethnic origin in the 1996 (5,326,995), 2001 (6,748,135), 2006 (5,748,725), 2011 (5,834,535), and 2016 (6,436,940).

Ethnic Origin (Single Responses), 1996–2016
1996			2001			2006			2011			2016		
#	Ethnic Origin	Pop.	#	Ethnic Origin	Pop.	#	Ethnic Origin	Pop.	#	Ethnic Origin	Pop.	#	Ethnic Origin	Pop.
1	Canadian	5,326,995	1	Canadian	6,748,135	1	Canadian	5,748,725	1	Canadian	5,834,535	1	Canadian	6,436,940
2	French	2,665,250	2	English	1,479,525	2	English	1,367,125	2	English	1,312,570	2	Chinese	1,439,980
3	English	2,048,275	3	French	1,060,760	3	French	1,230,535	3	Chinese	1,210,945	3	English	1,098,925
4	Chinese	800,470	4	Chinese	936,210	4	Chinese	1,135,365	4	French	1,165,465	4	Indian	1,096,850
5	Italian	729,455	5	Italian	726,275	5	Indian	780,175	5	Indian	919,155	5	French	1,006,180
6	German	726,145	6	German	705,600	6	Italian	741,045	6	Italian	700,845	6	Italian	695,415
7	Scottish	642,970	7	Scottish	607,235	7	German	670,640	7	German	608,520	7	Filipino	651,390
8	Irish	504,030	8	Indian	581,665	8	Scottish	568,515	8	Scottish	544,440	8	German	569,650
9	Indian	438,770	9	Irish	496,865	9	First Nations	512,150	9	First Nations	517,550	9	First Nations	526,570
10	First Nations	394,555	10	First Nations	455,805	10	Irish	491,030	10	Filipino	506,545	10	Scottish	475,575
11	Ukrainian	331,680	11	Ukrainian	326,195	11	Filipino	321,390	11	Irish	506,445	11	Irish	457,905
12	Dutch	313,880	12	Dutch	316,220	12	Dutch	303,400	12	Dutch	297,885	12	Dutch	289,675
13	Polish	265,930	13	Filipino	266,140	13	Ukrainian	300,590	13	Ukrainian	276,055	13	Ukrainian	273,810
14	Portuguese	252,640	14	Polish	260,415	14	Polish	269,375	14	Polish	255,135	14	Portuguese	264,815
15	Filipino	198,420	15	Portuguese	252,835	15	Portuguese	262,230	15	Portuguese	250,320	15	Polish	264,415
16	Jewish	195,810	16	Jewish	186,475	16	Greek	145,250	16	Vietnamese	157,450	16	Korean	177,925
17	Greek	144,940	17	Greek	143,785	17	Korean	137,790	17	Korean	154,355	17	Iranian	170,755
18	Jamaican	128,570	18	Jamaican	138,180	18	Vietnamese	136,445	18	Jamaican	142,870	18	Vietnamese	165,390
19	Vietnamese	110,390	19	Vietnamese	119,120	19	Jamaican	134,320	19	Greek	141,755	19	Jamaican	161,495
20	Hungarian	94,185	20	Korean	95,200	20	Jewish	134,045	20	Iranian	131,100	20	Pakistani	156,300

Ethnic Origin (Single and Multiple Responses), 1996–2016
1996			2001			2006			2011			2016		
#	Ethnic Origin	Pop.	#	Ethnic Origin	Pop.	#	Ethnic Origin	Pop.	#	Ethnic Origin	Pop.	#	Ethnic Origin	Pop.
1	Canadian	8,806,275	1	Canadian	11,682,680	1	Canadian	10,066,290	1	Canadian	10,563,805	1	Canadian	11,135,965
2	English	6,832,095	2	English	5,978,875	2	English	6,570,015	2	English	6,509,500	2	English	6,320,085
3	French	5,597,845	3	French	4,668,410	3	French	4,941,210	3	French	5,065,690	3	Scottish	4,799,005
4	Scottish	4,260,840	4	Scottish	4,157,210	4	Scottish	4,719,850	4	Scottish	4,714,970	4	French	4,670,595
5	Irish	3,767,610	5	Irish	3,822,660	5	Irish	4,354,155	5	Irish	4,544,870	5	Irish	4,627,000
6	German	2,757,140	6	German	2,742,765	6	German	3,179,425	6	German	3,203,330	6	German	3,322,405
7	Italian	1,207,475	7	Italian	1,270,370	7	Italian	1,445,335	7	Italian	1,488,425	7	Chinese	1,769,195
8	Ukrainian	1,026,475	8	Chinese	1,094,700	8	Chinese	1,346,510	8	Chinese	1,487,580	8	Italian	1,587,970
9	Chinese	921,585	9	Ukrainian	1,071,060	9	North American Indian	1,253,615	9	First Nations	1,369,115	9	First Nations	1,525,570
10	Dutch	916,215	10	North American Indian	1,000,890	10	Ukrainian	1,209,085	10	Ukrainian	1,251,170	10	Indian	1,374,715
11	North American Indian	867,225	11	Dutch	923,310	11	Dutch	1,035,965	11	Indian	1,165,145	11	Ukrainian	1,359,655
12	Polish	786,735	12	Polish	817,085	12	Polish	984,565	12	Dutch	1,067,245	12	Dutch	1,111,655
13	Indian	548,080	13	Indian	713,330	13	Indian	962,665	13	Polish	1,010,705	13	Polish	1,106,585
14	Jewish	351,705	14	Norwegian	363,760	14	Russian	500,600	14	Filipino	662,600	14	Filipino	837,135
15	Norwegian	346,310	15	Portuguese	357,690	15	Welsh	440,965	15	British Isles, n.i.e.	576,030	15	British Isles, n.i.e.	644,695
16	Welsh	338,905	16	Welsh	350,365	16	Filipino	436,190	16	Russian	550,520	16	Russian	622,445
17	Portuguese	335,110	17	Jewish	348,605	17	Norwegian	432,515	17	Welsh	458,705	17	Métis	599,995
18	Swedish	278,975	18	Russian	337,960	18	Portuguese	410,850	18	Norwegian	452,705	18	Portuguese	482,605
19	Russian	272,335	19	Filipino	327,550	19	Métis	409,065	19	Métis	447,655	19	Welsh	474,805
20	Hungarian	250,525	20	Métis	307,845	20	British Isles, n.i.e.	403,915	20	Portuguese	429,850	20	Norwegian	463,275

== Visible minority ==
Visible minority population by province and territory, 2016
Province/territory	South Asian	Chinese	Black	Filipino	Latin American	Arab	Southeast Asian	West Asian	Korean	Japanese	Visible minority, n.i.e.	Multiple visible minorities	Total visible minority population	Total population	Percent visible minority
Alberta	230,930	158,200	129,390	166,195	55,090	56,700	43,985	20,980	21,275	12,165	9,900	28,360	933,165	3,978,145	23.46%
British Columbia	365,705	508,480	43,500	145,025	44,115	19,840	54,920	48,695	60,495	41,230	8,760	40,465	1,381,235	4,560,240	30.29%
Manitoba	42,060	22,540	30,335	79,815	9,895	5,030	8,565	2,695	4,375	1,850	3,195	6,485	216,850	1,240,700	17.48%
New Brunswick	2,535	3,925	7,000	1,980	1,285	2,960	1,230	730	1,685	230	305	675	24,535	730,710	3.36%
Newfoundland and Labrador	2,645	2,325	2,355	1,390	635	1,375	340	220	80	60	150	255	11,810	512,250	2.31%
Northwest Territories	615	300	760	1,300	135	100	255	50	100	150	95	90	3,960	41,135	9.63%
Nova Scotia	7,910	8,640	21,915	3,400	1,685	8,110	1,195	1,540	1,540	695	630	1,395	58,650	908,340	6.46%
Nunavut	115	75	330	230	40	40	30	10	10	10	20	10	905	35,580	2.54%
Ontario	1,150,415	754,550	527,715	311,675	195,950	210,435	133,855	154,670	88,935	30,830	97,970	128,585	3,885,585	13,242,160	29.34%
Prince Edward Island	920	2,570	825	670	255	585	145	215	210	110	55	85	6,640	139,685	4.75%
Quebec	90,335	99,505	319,230	34,910	133,920	213,740	62,820	32,405	8,055	4,570	9,840	23,045	1,032,365	7,965,450	12.96%
Saskatchewan	19,960	15,545	14,925	32,340	4,195	4,300	5,745	2,065	1,875	955	1,150	2,820	115,875	1,070,560	10.82%
Yukon	500	415	270	1,190	130	10	180	30	70	65	15	120	3,000	35,115	8.54%
Canada	1,924,635	1,577,060	1,198,540	780,125	447,325	523,325	313,260	264,305	188,710	92,920	132,090	232,375	7,674,580	34,460,065	22.27%

Visible minority in Canadian cities over 100,000 people, 2016
City	Population	Visible minority	Black	East Asian	Latin American	South Asian	Southeast Asian	West Asian	Arab	Multiracial	Other
Toronto	2,731,571	51.5%	8.9%	13.2%	2.9%	12.6%	7.2%	2.2%	1.3%	1.8%	1.4%
Montreal	1,704,694	34.2%	10.3%	3.7%	4.1%	3.3%	3.5%	0.9%	7.3%	0.7%	0.3%
Calgary	1,239,220	36.2%	4.2%	8.5%	2.1%	9.5%	7.3%	1.0%	2.0%	1.1%	0.4%
Ottawa	934,243	26.3%	6.6%	5.1%	1.2%	4.2%	2.7%	1.0%	4.5%	0.9%	0.3%
Edmonton	932,546	37.1%	5.9%	7.3%	1.9%	9.5%	7.7%	0.7%	2.6%	1.1%	0.4%
Mississauga	721,599	57.2%	6.6%	8.7%	2.3%	23.2%	7.2%	1.1%	5.1%	1.9%	1.3%
Winnipeg	705,224	28.0%	3.9%	3.6%	1.0%	5.4%	11.8%	0.4%	0.7%	0.9%	0.4%
Vancouver	631,486	51.6%	1.0%	30.2%	1.8%	6.0%	8.7%	1.4%	0.5%	1.8%	0.2%
Brampton	593,638	73.3%	13.9%	1.7%	2.4%	44.3%	4.8%	0.9%	1.0%	1.6%	2.7%
Hamilton	536,917	19.0%	3.8%	2.5%	1.6%	4.2%	2.8%	0.9%	2.0%	0.7%	0.5%
Quebec City	531,902	6.4%	2.4%	0.5%	1.3%	0.3%	0.5%	0.1%	1.2%	0.1%	0.1%
Surrey	517,887	58.5%	1.8%	7.8%	1.4%	32.8%	8.8%	0.7%	1.1%	1.2%	0.4%
Laval	422,993	26.1%	7.8%	1.0%	3.1%	2.1%	2.1%	1.0%	8.2%	0.3%	0.1%
Halifax	403,131	11.4%	3.8%	2.2%	0.3%	1.6%	0.9%	0.3%	1.8%	0.3%	0.1%
London	383,822	19.9%	3.0%	3.8%	2.4%	3.1%	2.1%	0.9%	3.6%	0.6%	0.4%
Markham	328,966	77.9%	2.9%	46.8%	0.5%	17.8%	3.8%	2.4%	1.0%	2.1%	0.9%
Vaughan	306,233	35.4%	2.7%	8.7%	2.4%	10.1%	5.1%	2.9%	1.4%	1.4%	0.8%
Gatineau	276,245	13.5%	6.1%	1.0%	1.5%	0.4%	0.7%	0.3%	3.1%	0.3%	0.2%
Longueuil	239,700	18.6%	7.0%	1.4%	3.1%	0.8%	1.3%	0.8%	3.2%	0.4%	0.3%
Burnaby	232,755	63.6%	1.6%	38.9%	2.0%	8.1%	7.7%	2.2%	0.7%	2.1%	0.3%
Saskatoon	246,376	19.8%	2.2%	3.6%	0.8%	5.5%	5.4%	0.5%	1.0%	0.6%	0.2%
Kitchener	233,222	21.8%	4.1%	2.6%	2.6%	5.0%	2.9%	1.2%	1.8%	0.8%	0.8%
Windsor	217,188	26.9%	5.0%	3.6%	1.2%	4.5%	3.0%	0.6%	7.5%	0.9%	0.6%
Regina	215,106	19.2%	3.0%	6.2%	0.6%	5.9%	5.2%	0.3%	0.7%	0.4%	0.2%
Richmond	198,309	76.3%	0.6%	55.6%	0.8%	7.3%	7.9%	0.6%	0.8%	2.4%	0.2%
Richmond Hill	195,022	60.0%	2.0%	32.5%	0.8%	7.7%	2.7%	10.4%	1.8%	1.6%	0.4%
Oakville	193,832	30.8%	2.9%	9.0%	1.9%	8.9%	2.4%	1.1%	3.2%	1.0%	0.4%
Burlington	183,314	16.0%	2.1%	2.9%	1.3%	4.8%	2.0%	0.6%	1.4%	0.6%	0.4%
Greater Sudbury	161,531	3.8%	0.9%	0.7%	0.2%	0.9%	0.4%	0.1%	0.4%	0.1%	0.0%
Sherbrooke	161,323	7.3%	2.2%	0.4%	1.7%	0.3%	0.4%	0.8%	1.2%	0.2%	0.0%
Oshawa	159,458	16.0%	5.5%	2.0%	0.8%	3.8%	1.6%	0.4%	0.6%	0.8%	0.8%
Saguenay	145,949	1.4%	0.5%	0.2%	0.2%	0.1%	0.1%	0.0%	0.2%	0.0%	0.0%
Lévis	143,414	2.2%	0.7%	0.3%	0.4%	0.1%	0.2%	0.0%	0.4%	0.0%	0.0%
Barrie	141,434	10.3%	2.7%	1.8%	1.1%	2.2%	1.4%	0.2%	0.3%	0.4%	0.3%
Abbotsford	141,397	33.7%	1.0%	3.0%	0.8%	25.5%	2.2%	0.2%	0.2%	0.5%	0.2%
St. Catharines	133,113	12.7%	2.9%	2.7%	1.7%	1.4%	1.8%	0.3%	1.1%	0.7%	0.2%
Trois-Rivières	134,413	3.5%	1.4%	0.3%	0.8%	0.1%	0.2%	0.0%	0.6%	0.0%	0.0%
Cambridge	129,920	15.6%	2.5%	1.4%	1.3%	6.2%	2.1%	0.3%	0.8%	0.4%	0.6%
Coquitlam	139,284	50.2%	1.1%	29.3%	1.6%	4.5%	5.2%	5.6%	1.0%	1.7%	0.2%
Kingston	123,798	9.7%	1.5%	2.7%	0.7%	2.0%	1.1%	0.4%	0.8%	0.4%	0.1%
Whitby	128,377	25.3%	8.0%	3.1%	1.1%	6.6%	2.4%	1.0%	0.8%	1.5%	0.9%
Guelph	131,794	18.8%	2.2%	3.6%	1.0%	5.0%	4.1%	1.2%	0.6%	0.9%	0.2%
Kelowna	127,380	9.5%	0.8%	2.9%	0.6%	2.6%	1.6%	0.3%	0.2%	0.3%	0.2%
Saanich	114,148	22.1%	1.0%	10.5%	0.7%	5.0%	3.0%	0.4%	0.6%	0.6%	0.2%
Ajax	119,677	56.7%	16.7%	3.2%	1.4%	20.9%	5.3%	2.4%	1.7%	2.4%	2.7%
Thunder Bay	107,909	4.5%	0.6%	1.1%	0.3%	0.9%	0.8%	0.2%	0.3%	0.2%	0.0%
Terrebonne	111,575	11.8%	4.5%	0.4%	1.7%	0.1%	0.6%	0.1%	1.7%	0.1%	0.0%
St. John's	108,860	7.0%	1.4%	1.6%	0.5%	1.5%	0.7%	0.2%	1.0%	0.1%	0.1%
Langley	117,285	18.7%	1.0%	8.0%	0.9%	4.4%	3.0%	0.3%	0.3%	0.5%	0.1%
Chatham-Kent	101,647	4.6%	2.1%	0.6%	0.2%	0.6%	0.5%	0.0%	0.2%	0.2%	0.1%
Milton	110,128	42.8%	4.8%	3.1%	2.4%	21.0%	4.7%	0.9%	3.5%	1.4%	0.9%
Waterloo	104,986	26.4%	1.9%	10.6%	1.4%	6.4%	1.7%	1.1%	1.8%	0.9%	0.6%
Delta	102,238	36.0%	0.8%	9.2%	0.8%	20.3%	3.2%	0.3%	0.3%	0.8%	0.3%
Red Deer	100,418	15.5%	1.8%	1.8%	1.8%	1.7%	7.0%	0.4%	0.5%	0.4%	0.1%

== Aboriginal population ==
Total aboriginal population
Group	1996		2001		2006		2011		2016	
Group	%	Total	%	Total	%	Total	%	Total	%	Total
Total Aboriginal	2.8%	799,005	3.3%	976,305	3.8%	1,172,785	4.3%	1,400,685	4.9%	1,673,780
First Nations	1.8%	529,040	2.1%	608,850	2.2%	698,025	2.6%	851,560	2.8%	977,230
Métis	0.7%	204,115	1.0%	292,305	1.2%	389,780	1.4%	451,795	1.7%	587,545
Inuit	0.14%	40,220			0.16%	50,485	0.2%	59,445	0.2%	65,025

Note: Inuit, other Aboriginal and mixed Aboriginal groups are not listed as their own, but they are all accounted for in total Aboriginal

Aboriginal population by province and territory, 2011
Province/territory	Not Aboriginal	First Nations	Métis	Inuit	Aboriginal, n.i.e.	Multiple Aboriginal identities	Total Aboriginal population	Total population
Alberta	2,690,960	116,670	96,870	1,985	3,300	1,870	220,695	3,567,980
British Columbia	2,911,295	155,020	69,475	1,570	3,745	2,480	232,290	4,324,455
Manitoba	824,830	114,225	78,830	580	1,055	1,200	195,895	1,174,350
New Brunswick	696,080	16,120	4,850	485	1,020	150	22,620	735,835
Newfoundland and Labrador	464,540	19,315	7,660	6,265	2,300	260	35,800	507,270
Northwest Territories	16,920	13,350	3,250	4,335	185	45	21,160	40,800
Nova Scotia	825,055	21,895	10,050	695	980	225	33,850	906,175
Nunavut	3,825	125	130	27,070	15	20	27,365	31,700
Ontario	9,070,800	201,100	86,020	3,355	8,040	2,910	301,430	12,651,795
Prince Edward Island	130,890	1,520	410	55	235	0	2,230	137,380
Quebec	6,740,375	82,425	40,960	12,570	4,415	1,545	141,915	7,732,525
Saskatchewan	787,745	103,205	52,450	290	1,120	675	157,740	1,008,760
Yukon	23,590	6,585	845	175	70	25	7,705	33,320
Canada	25,186,890	851,560	451,795	59,440	26,475	11,415	1,400,685	32,852,325

City	Population	Total Aboriginal	First Nations	Métis
Toronto	2,576,025	0.7%	0.5%	0.2%
Montreal	1,612,640	0.6%	0.3%	0.2%
Calgary	1,082,235	2.7%	1.2%	1.4%
Ottawa	867,090	2.1%	1.2%	0.7%
Edmonton	795,675	5.3%	2.4%	2.7%
Mississauga	708,725	0.5%	0.3%	0.1%
Winnipeg	649,995	11.7%	5.9%	6.3%
Vancouver	590,210	2.0%	1.3%	0.6%
Brampton	521,315	0.7%	0.4%	0.2%
Hamilton	509,640	2.0%	1.6%	0.3%
Quebec City	502,595	0.9%	0.5%	0.4%
Surrey	463,340	2.9%	1.9%	1.0%
Laval	392,725	0.6%	0.3%	0.2%
Halifax	384,330	2.5%	1.5%	0.8%
London	360,715	1.9%	1.4%	0.4%
Markham	300,135	0.2%	0.1%	0.1%
Vaughan	286,305	0.2%	0.1%	0.0%
Gatineau	261,665	3.5%	1.8%	1.5%
Longueuil	227,970	1.0%	0.6%	0.0%
Burnaby	220,255	1.5%	0.9%	0.5%
Saskatoon	218,315	10.2%	4.9%	4.6%
Kitchener	215,950	1.5%	0.9%	0.5%
Windsor	208,015	2.3%	1.3%	0.9%
Regina	189,740	9.9%	5.8%	3.9%
Richmond	189,305	1.0%	0.7%	0.3%
Richmond Hill	184,370	0.2%	0.1%	0.0%
Oakville	180,430	0.6%	0.4%	0.2%
Burlington	173,495	0.9%	0.5%	0.3%
Greater Sudbury	157,765	8.2%	3.8%	4.1%
Sherbrooke	150,255	0.9%	0.5%	0.3%
Oshawa	147,680	2.0%	1.2%	0.8%
Saguenay	141,335	2.5%	0.8%	1.6%
Lévis	135,835	0.5%	0.2%	0.2%
Barrie	133,240	2.6%	1.4%	1.2%
Abbotsford	130,950	4.0%	2.5%	1.6%
St. Catharines	128,770	1.9%	1.2%	0.6%
Trois-Rivières	126,980	1.1%	0.6%	0.4%
Cambridge	125,060	2.0%	1.2%	0.6%
Coquitlam	125,015	2.1%	1.1%	0.9%
Kingston	118,930	2.9%	2.0%	0.8%
Whitby	120,285	1.2%	0.7%	0.4%
Guelph	120,550	1.6%	1.0%	0.6%
Kelowna	114,570	4.5%	2.1%	2.3%
Saanich	107,855	2.7%	1.5%	1.1%
Ajax	109,220	1.0%	0.7%	0.3%
Thunder Bay	105,950	9.5%	7.3%	2.0%
Terrebonne	105,610	0.7%	0.5%	0.1%
St. John's	103,905	2.6%	1.2%	0.8%
Langley	103,145	3.4%	1.6%	1.7%
Chatham-Kent	101,680	2.9%	1.7%	0.9%

== See also ==
- 1666 census of New France
- Canada 1911 Census
- Canada 1996 Census
- Canada 2001 Census
- Canada 2006 Census
- Canada 2011 Census
- Canada 2016 Census
- Demographics of Canada
- Immigration to Canada
  - Canada immigration statistics
  - Annual immigration statistics of Canada
- Multiculturalism in Canada
- Population of Canada by years
