= Southeast Asian Canadians =

Canadians of Southeast Asian origin

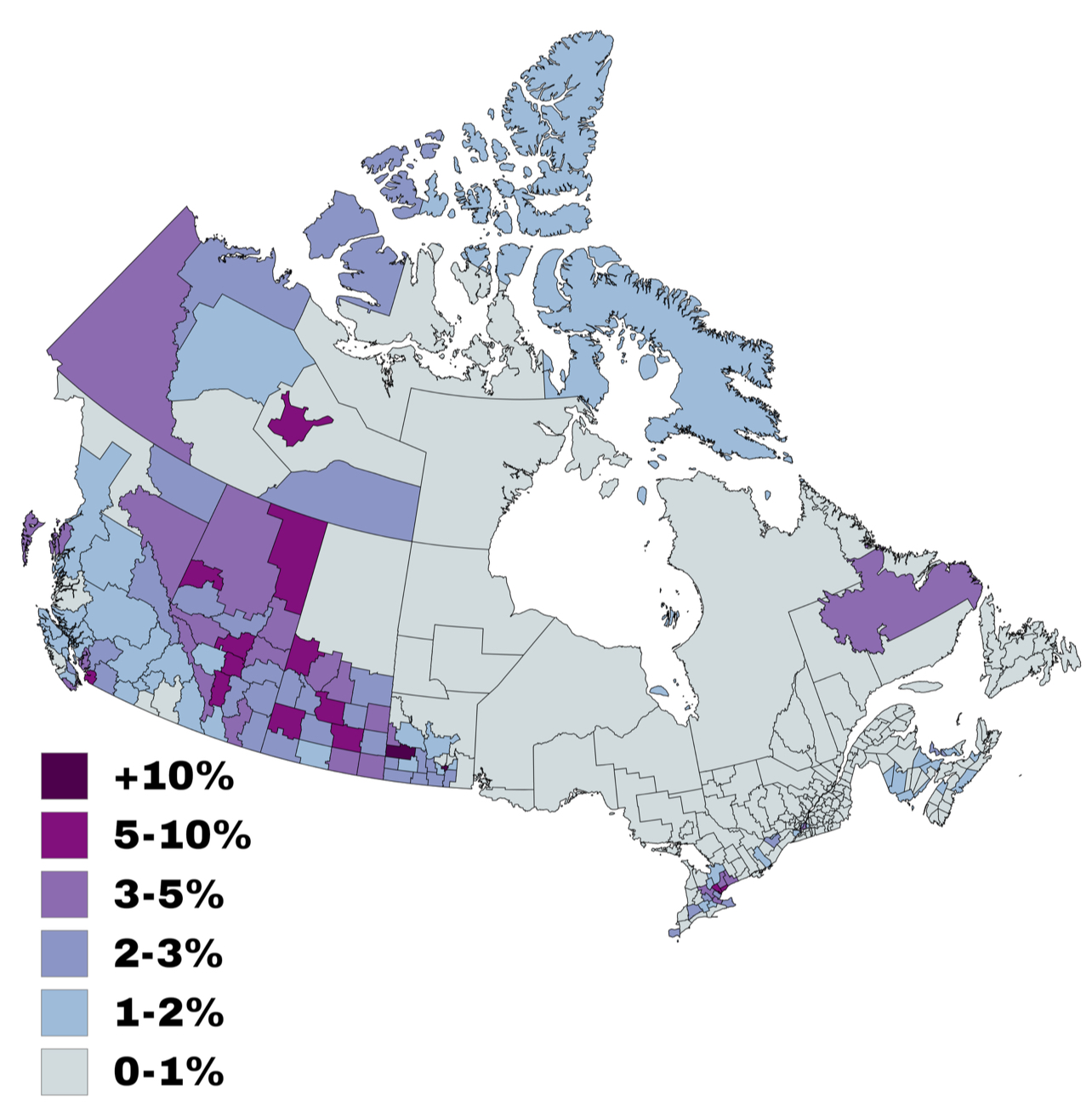
- Southeast Asian ancestry % by census division in Canada (2021)

Total population
- 1,434,330

Regions with significant populations
- Southern Ontario, Southwestern BC, Central Alberta, Montreal, Most urban areas

Languages
- Canadian English · Canadian French · Filipino · Indonesian · Khmer · Lao · Malay · Thai · Vietnamese

Religion
- Buddhism · Christianity · Islam · Irreligion

Related ethnic groups
- Asian Canadians · Southeast Asians in the United Kingdom · Asian Americans

Southeast Asian Canadians are Canadians who were either born in or can trace their ancestry to Southeast Asia. The term Southeast Asian Canadian is a subgroup of Asian Canadians. According to Statistics Canada, Southeast Asian Canadians are considered visible minorities and can be further divided by ethnicity and/or nationality, such as Cambodian Canadian, Filipino Canadian, Indonesian Canadian, Laotian Canadian, Malaysian Canadian, Singaporean Canadian, Thai Canadian, or Vietnamese Canadian, as seen on demi-decadal census data.

== Terminology ==
Southeast Asian Canadians are typically identified under the term "Asian"; popular usage of this term in Canada generally excludes both West and South Asians, instead solely referring to individuals of East Asian or Southeast Asian ancestry.

== See also ==
- Cambodian Canadians
- Filipino Canadians
- Indonesian Canadians
- Laotian Canadians
- Malaysian Canadians
- Singaporean Canadians
- Thai Canadians
- Vietnamese Canadians
