= Honey Cocaine =

Honey C
- Born: Sochitta Sal; October 22, 1992 (age 33); Toronto, Ontario, Canada
- Genres: Hip hop
- Occupations: Rapper, songwriter
- Years active: 2011–present
- Label: Last Kings Warner Chappell
- Website: honeycmusic.com

Sochitta Sal (born October 22, 1992), known professionally by her stage name Honey C or Honey Cocaine, is a Cambodian-Canadian rapper from Toronto, Ontario, Canada.

== Early life and education ==
Sochitta Sal was born and raised Toronto in the Jane-Finch neighborhood, on the northwest end of North York. Sal is of Cambodian descent. Sal has 6 older brothers. Currently, Sal splits her residency between Los Angeles and Toronto.

== Career ==
Her debut single "I Don't Give a Fuck" was released in 2011.

She was discovered by Tyga after he came across a freestyle video she posted on YouTube (over his "Rack City" instrumental), signing with his Last Kings Entertainment imprint shortly afterward, her debut Mixtape titled "Fuck yo feeling's Vol 1" was Released on February 14, 2012.

In March 2012, she was grazed in the arm by a bullet while riding in a van, after she and Tyga performed at a concert in Omaha, Nebraska. She was treated and shortly released from the hospital. In late 2012, she featured on Tyga's Well Done 3 mixtape. She became known in 2012 for her feature on Tyga's "Heisman" track.

In 2013, she signed a publishing deal with Warner Chappell Music. Honey C also toured with Tyga in 2013 and released a few of her best-known solo singles that year and into 2014 ("Curveball," "ChiChi Get The Yayo," "Middlefinger" etc.). In 2014, she released Like a Drug. By 2015, Honey C had features with artists such as Kid Ink, Dizzy Wright, and Kirko Bangz.

== Like a Drug ==
Like a Drug is her fourth mixtape, released on October 22, 2014.

Background and development

After the release of her third mixtape Thug Love, Honey Cocaine kept on appearing on other artists' songs. On January 15, 2014, the song "Blueberry Chills" featuring Chanel West Coast was released. Honey Cocaine first announced her plans to release a new mixtape in February 2014. On June 29, 2014, she released a snippet of the song "Side Chick". A snippet of the song "Gwola" was released a month later. On August 26, 2014, she announced the release date of the mixtape, scheduled on her birthday, October 22.

Singles

The first single "Curveball" was released on October 13, 2014. The accompanying music video was unveiled on the day of the release.

=== Like a Drug track listing ===
No.	Title	Producer(s)	Length
1.	"Don't Get Along"	King Dave	3:15
2.	"Can't Sit With Us"		2:50
3.	"Hella Illy"		2:34
4.	"Tha Six" (featuring Tory Lanez)		2:48
5.	"Dead Azz"		2:44
6.	"Curveball"	DJ ASAP	3:03
7.	"Shady Wit Me"	King Dave	2:38
8.	"Jumpman" (featuring T Rell)	King Dave	3:58
9.	"Gwola" (featuring Kid Ink & Maino)	DKevrim	3:49
10.	"Side Bitch"	King Dave	2:37
11.	"None of My Business" (featuring Kirko Bangz & Constantine)	D Berg Studios	3:18
12.	"Babysitta"	Andrew Balogh	2:29
13.	"Sound Right"	King Dave	3:21
14.	"BTCHSM" (featuring Snow Tha Product)		2:51
Total length:			42:15

== Selected discography ==
=== Mixtapes ===
List of mixtapes, with selected details
Title	Mixtape details
Fuck yo Feelings Vol. #1	Released: February 14, 2012
90's Gold	Released: July 9, 2012
Thug Love	Released: March 31, 2013
Like a Drug	Released: October 22, 2014
The Gift Rap (EP)	Released: April 7, 2015
Wildfire	Released: August 3, 2018

== Music videos ==
=== As lead artist ===
List of music videos, with showing year released
Title	Year
"I Don't Give a Fuck"	2011
"Rack City (Freestyle)"	2012
"Heisman" (with Tyga)	2012
"Feel Shit"	2012
"Heisman, Pt. II" (with Tyga)	2012
"T.O. Gold"	2012
"Hypnotize"	2012
"All Gold Eythang (Freestyle)"	2012
"Love Coca"	2012
"Runaway Bride"	2013
"Bad Gal"	2013
"Chichi Get the Yayo"	2013
"Money Murderer"	2013
"Me N My Toolie"	2013
"Middle Finger"	2013
"Curveball"	2014
"Babysitta"	2014
"Jumpman" (with T. Rell)	2015
"Shady Wit Me"	2015
"Side Bitch"	2015
"Hella Illy"	2015
"Honeydick"	2015

=== As featured artist ===
List of music videos, with showing year released
Title	Year
"Bad Boy" (Teyana Taylor featuring Honey Cocaine)	2012
"Fashion" (Dizzy Wright featuring Honey Cocaine and Kid Ink)	2013
"Flexin" (Yultron featuring Honey Cocaine)	2013
"Party" (Chanel West Coast featuring Honey Cocaine)	2013
"Pressed" (Tyga featuring Honey Cocaine)	2014
"Blueberry Chills" (Chanel West Coast featuring Honey Cocaine)	2014
"Be" (apl.de.ap featuring Honey Cocaine & Jessica Reynoso)	2015
"Mommae (Remix)" (Jay Park featuring Crush, Simon Dominic & Honey Cocaine)	2016
"Faded" (Cierra Ramirez featuring Casey Veggies, Honey Cocaine)	2016
"Salty" (Barely Alive featuring Honey Cocaine)	2016
"Nann Nigga" (Tyga featuring Honey Cocaine)	2017
