= Ajoa Mintah =

Canadian engineer and entrepreneur

- Born: 1977 (age 48–49)
- Education: University of Waterloo
- Occupations: Super boss and Mummy

Ajoa Mintah is a Ghanaian Canadian engineer and entrepreneur known for founding Four All Ice Cream, based in Kitchener, Ontario.

== Early life and education ==
Mintah was born to Ghanaian parents who married after meeting in Canada. Her father worked in food science, including for a time with United Nations, and her mother was a lawyer.

Mintah studied chemical engineering at the University of Waterloo. She graduated with a BASc in 2001. Before transitioning her career into ice cream production, she took a course about ice cream in the food science department at the University of Guelph.

== Career ==
After graduating from the University of Waterloo, Mintah worked in automotive, research and consulting, and accounting sectors.

Four All Ice Cream was founded in 2017. The business began production in a factory space in Kitchener, holding pop-up shops in the Region of Waterloo before opening a retail space in 2020. The name of the company is tied to Mintah's focus on four categories of ice-cream; nostalgia, foodie, vegan and classic flavours. Her ice cream uses locally sourced products and relies on a stabilizing process she engineered in order to extend the product's shelf life while minimizing additives.

In August 2021, Mintah created a flavour called Our Heroes Eat Ice Cream in recognition of front line hospital works, with some of the proceeds from sales going to a fund to support staff at Kitchener's Grand River Hospital.
