= Nana aba Duncan =

Writer and radio host

- Born: December 8, 1977 (age 48); Mampong, Ghana
- Education: University of Western Ontario
- Occupation: Carleton University Professor
- Organization(s): Mary Anne Shad Cary Centre For Journalism and Belonging Reporting In Black Communities
- Known for: Fresh Air
- Website: https://nanaabaduncan.com/

Nana aba Duncan is a Ghanaian Canadian writer, broadcaster, and academic. In 2021, she was appointed Carty Chair in Journalism, Diversity and Inclusion Studies at Carleton University's School of Journalism.

From 2016 until 2020 she was host of the Canadian Broadcasting Corporation's Ontario weekend morning show Fresh Air. She also hosts and produces the podcast Media Girlfriends. She went on leave from Fresh Air in the fall of 2020 in order to accept a position as a William Southam Journalism Fellow at University of Toronto's Massey College.

== Biography ==
Duncan was born in Accra, Ghana and raised in Newmarket, Ontario. She studied psychology at the University of Toronto before completing a Masters in journalism at the University of Western Ontario. Prior to becoming the host of Fresh Air in 2017, Duncan appeared on and wrote for other CBC shows including Go and Radio 2 Top 20. She also contributed to local Black-owned media publications in the GTA, including The Ghanaian News.

In 2016 Duncan participated in a Women in Media panel at Cawthra Park Secondary School as part of a Black History Month event alongside Nneka Elliott, Arisa Cox, Karlyn Percil-Mercieca, and Jully Black. During the event Duncan discussed the challenges of working in news environments with predominantly white directors and producers. She has also spoken publicly about the gender pay gap. In a 2019 interview Duncan shared that as a new professional she "didn't realize negotiating was something I could even consider," and has since shifted to discussing salary and negotiating with women colleagues. The experiences of women in media, including their careers and personal lives, is a central theme of her podcast Media Girlfriends. It launched in 2016 and has evolved to include in-person discussion panels, mentoring, and the funding of scholarships for women and non-binary journalism students.

Duncan was selected as one of 30 women to participate in the first cohort of Poynter's 2020 Leadership Academy for Women in Media. The same year she was also featured in Our Mosaic Lives, a Black History Month exhibit at the Lakeshore location of the Innisfil Public Library, celebrating the accomplishments of Black women and girls. In addition to her radio broadcast work, Duncan regularly hosts and moderates media events. From 2009 to 2010 she toured schools across the country alongside performers Eternia and Masai One as part of Because I am A Girl, aimed at fostering female empowerment and community involvement.

== See also ==
- CBC Podcast Showcase
