= Ghanaian Canadians =

Canadians of Ghanaian birth or descent

Total population
- Various estimates: 35,495

Regions with significant populations
- Vancouver, Montreal, Toronto, Winnipeg, Edmonton, Calgary, Ottawa, Quebec City, Brampton

Languages
- French, English, Ghanaian languages (Akan, Dagbani, Ewe, Ga, etc.)

Religion
- Mainly Christianity (70%), Islam (15%)

Related ethnic groups
- Ghanaians, Nigerian Canadians, Igbo Canadians, Black Canadians, Indo-Canadians, Chinese Canadians, Indigenous peoples in Canada

Ghanaian Canadians are a Canadian ethnic group of full or partial Ghanaian ancestry. Ghanaians who became naturalized citizens of Canada preferably refer to themselves as Ghanaian Canadians.

== Overview ==
Ghanaians first immigrated to Canada in the 1960s. Many Ghanaians reside in the Toronto area, although quite a few can be found in other parts of Canada. Although characterized by their religious involvement, Ghanaian Canadians seem to have reservations about integrating into broader Canadian community.

=== Languages ===
Most Ghanaian Canadians speak English fluently as it is the official language of communication in Ghana. Most also speak local languages in addition to English, the most popular being Twi. Other spoken languages are Fante, Ga, Ewe, Dagbani, Nzema, Gonja, and Kasem. Ghanaians have an easier time adapting to life in Canada than other immigrants because their homeland of Ghana has the English language as the official language and it is spoken by the majority of Ghana's population.

== Demographics ==
Population by ancestry by Canadian province or territory (2016)
Province	Population	Percentage	Source
Ontario	24,845	0.2%	
Alberta	4,465	0.1%	
Quebec	3,235	0.0%	
British Columbia	1,600	0.0%	
Saskatchewan	555	0.1%	
Manitoba	385	0.0%	
Nova Scotia	190	0.0%	
New Brunswick	95	0.0%	
Newfoundland and Labrador	65	0.0%	
Northwest Territories	30	0.1%	
Prince Edward Island	15	0.0%	
Yukon	15	0.0%	
Nunavut	10	0.0%	
Canada	35,495	0.1%	

== Notable people ==
=== Athletes ===
- Ruky Abdulai, long jumper and heptathlete
- Jeff Addai, soccer player
- Natey Adjei, football player
- Richard Adu-Bobie, sprinter
- Martha Adusei, sprinter
- Kojo Aidoo, football player
- Ohenewa Akuffo, wrestler
- Kwabena Asare, football player
- Nana Attakora, soccer player
- Kwame Awuah, soccer player
- Kwaku Boateng, high jumper
- Alphonso Davies (born in Ghana to Liberian parents), soccer player
- Randy Edwini-Bonsu, soccer player
- Sam Effah, sprinter
- Kaya Forson, swimmer
- Richie Laryea, soccer player
- Eric Lee, football player
- Philomena Mensah, sprinter
- Christabel Nettey, long jumper
- William Njoku, basketball player
- Kofi Opare, soccer player
- Flings Owusu-Agyapong, sprinter

=== Beauty Queens ===
- Menaye Donkor, beauty queen, entrepreneur and philanthropist
- Adwoa Yamoah, beauty queen

=== Media, Film and Television ===
- Jackie Appiah, actress
- Jojo Chintoh, broadcast journalist
- Nana aba Duncan radio host and writer
- Florence Blain Mbaye, actress
- Hailliote Sumney, actress and television personality

=== Musicians ===
- Kwajo Cinqo, rapper, producer, and record executive
- Emay, rapper
- Friyie, rapper and singer
- Rich Kidd, rapper and producer
- Kae Sun, singer-songwriter
- Spek Won, rapper

=== Writers and Authors ===
- Randell Adjei, poet
- Esi Edugyan, novelist
- Dannabang Kuwabong, author, poet and professor

== See also ==
- Black Canadians
- Indo-Canadians
- Chinese Canadians
- Indigenous peoples in Canada
- Ghanaian Australians
- Ghanaians in the United Kingdom
- Ghanaian Americans
- Ghanaians in Italy
- Ghanaians in Germany
- Ghanaians in France
