= Cambodian Canadians =

ជនជាតិខ្មែរកាណាដា Canadiens cambodgiens

Total population
- 41,950 (2021)

Regions with significant populations
- Quebec, Ontario, Alberta, British Columbia

Languages
- Khmer, Quebec French, Cambodian French, Canadian English

Religion
- Theravada Buddhism, Roman Catholic

Related ethnic groups
- Khmers, Asian Canadians, Thai Canadians, Laotian Canadians, Vietnamese Canadians

Cambodian Canadians (Khmer: ជនជាតិខ្មែរកាណាដា; French: Canadiens cambodgiens) are Canadians of Cambodian ethnic origin or descent. As of 2021 there are a total of 41,950 Canadian Cambodians, most of whom reside in Toronto and Montreal.

Aside from their primary language of Khmer, many Cambodians are known to also speak French and English. Buddhism, Catholicism and Christianity are common religions among Cambodian-Canadians.

== History ==
During the Cambodian genocide of 1975-1979, nearly two million Cambodians were enslaved and forced into concentration camps under the tyranny of the Khmer Rouge regime, by which they were brutally tortured, massacred, and discriminated against at large. The tragedies and destruction from this period resulted in a large wave of Cambodian refugees, most of whom migrated to Canada, the U.S., France and Australia. In 1981, there were 13,000 Cambodian-Canadian Refugees, with most of the population settling into major cities such as Montreal, Toronto, Ottawa, Calgary, Edmonton, Victoria, Vancouver and Quebec City. The Jane and Finch neighborhood of Toronto boasts a visible Cambodian population, in which they make up about 4% of the community. By 2016, the number of Cambodians in Canada had risen to 38,490.

== Religion ==
Cambodians are generally known as advocates of Buddhism, following a syncretic blend of Buddhist traditions and the teachings of various ethnic religions. The Cambodian communities of Canada annually celebrate their New Year in April and Ancestors' Day in October. The festival of Ancestors' Day, or "Pchum Ben", is the remembrance of the deceased. On this day is when Cambodians pay their respects to deceased relatives and ancestors.

== Organizations ==
In 1979, elder members of the Cambodian-Canadian community established the CCAO (Cambodian-Canadian Association of Ontario); other community organizations of Cambodian foundation include the Khmer Buddhist Group.

== Demographics ==
Population by ancestry by Canadian province or territory (2016)
Province	Population	Percentage	Source
Quebec	15,350	0.2%	
Ontario	14,655	0.1%	
Alberta	4,265	0.1%	
British Columbia	3,235	0.1%	
Manitoba	525	0.0%	
Saskatchewan	310	0.0%	
New Brunswick	65	0.0%	
Nova Scotia	55	0.0%	
Newfoundland and Labrador	25	0.0%	
Northwest Territories	10	0.0%	
Prince Edward Island	15	0.0%	
Nunavut	0	0.0%	
Yukon	0	0.0%	
Canada	38,490	0.1%	

== Notable people ==
- Honey Cocaine, rapper
- Patricia Hy-Boulais, former tennis player
- Dany Pen, activist
- Paul Tom, filmmaker
- Ellen Wong, actress

== See also ==
- Cambodians in the Greater Toronto Area
- Cambodia–Canada relations
