= Thai Canadians =

Total population
- 22,270 (by ancestry, 2021 Census)

Regions with significant populations
- Ontario: 12,970
- British Columbia: 11,870
- Alberta: 2,000
- Quebec: 1,000
- Manitoba: 610

Languages
- Canadian English · Quebec French · Thai

Religion
- Theravada Buddhism, Christianity

Related ethnic groups
- Thai people, Laotian Canadians, Cambodian Canadians, Malaysian Canadians, Thai Americans

Thai Canadians are Canadian citizens who trace their ancestry to Thailand or Thai citizens who trace their ancestry to Canada.

== Migration history ==
Migration from Thailand to Canada has gradually increased since the 1950s, when a few Thai students first came to study at Canadian universities. Migration has since continued at a slow pace, with a brief increase after the 1997 financial crisis in Thailand, which resulted in more Thais looking for work and educational opportunities overseas. Thai immigrants who choose to remain in Canada have generally immigrated to study, to take up a business, or to marry a Canadian. Many of them claim that they did not originally intend to stay in Canada. According to the 1991 census, there were 5,820 immigrants born in Thailand; 2,900 whose first language spoken at home was the Thai language; and 2,770 who claimed that they were of Thai ethnic origin. The larger figure for immigrants is explained by the fact that a certain number are likely ethnic Chinese and perhaps Lao from Thailand. Thai couples and small groups have settled primarily in Toronto, Vancouver, Calgary, and Montreal.

While most Thai Canadians are professionals, students, or have married Canadian men, there are occasional instances of young women entering the country as artists and entertainers, or as visitors who become afterward bonafide Canadians by marrying or contributing to the culture in one way or another. Some are bilingual and, like many immigrants, speak their adopted language more clearly than some natives.

Some Thais in Canada work in the restaurant industry and Thai cuisine, known for its balance between sweet, sour, salty and spicy flavours, and for its use of fresh herbs, coconut milk and galangal root. This cuisine has become popular in Canada, particularly in urban areas. One notable example of a Thai in this industry is internationally acclaimed chef Sasi Meechai-Lim, who resides in Toronto, where she has opened several restaurants.

== Employment ==
Thai immigrants to Canada are primarily well-educated professionals working as bankers, dentists, doctors, nurses, computer technicians and engineers. Many of them opened businesses such as Thai restaurants or Muay Thai gyms, which have become popular in Canada. Generally, they have been economically successful in Canada and have contributed to the Canadian economy.

In recent years, some Thais have come to Canada as live-in caregivers. Despite having positive bilateral relations, the Canadian Government discontinued its Work Experience Program (now known as the International Experience Canada program) to Thais. Work and study permits, as well as temporary resident visas, are seldom issued to Thai nationals from the Canadian embassy based in Thailand. A very small number of Thai nationals have become permanent residents and settled in Canada.

== Organizations ==
The Thai Community Association of British Columbia, formed in 1986, is officially registered as a community organization. It sponsors a variety of events, offers Thai language classes when there is a need, and produces newsletters in Thai at irregular intervals. The Friends of Thailand, formed in 1988, is open to interested non-Thai Canadians, although its members also include many Thai with Canadian spouses. Its goal is to help Canadians understand and appreciate Thai culture.

In Toronto, about ten families formed the Thai Association of Canada in 1983, but they soon reduced their mandate to Ontario. The group organizes social events, such as summer picnics and New Year's parties, and arranges for Thai language classes.

Thai Buddhist Association, which has been meeting informally for many years, has been dedicated to maintaining the Thai Buddhist tradition in Canada. In 1992, a Christian church in East Vancouver was converted to be Vancouver's first Thai temple, founded by the senior monk Luang Phor Viriyang Sirintharo. In 1993, a building on the outskirts of Toronto was purchased and dedicated to become the second Thai Buddhist Yanviriya temple. In 2013, there were six Thai Buddhist temples, two Buddhist monasteries, and two meditation societies across Canada. These have become important for Thai-Canadians for religious and cultural practices, building community, and maintaining cultural identity.

== Notable Thai Canadians ==
- Amanda Obdam – Thai model and beauty pageant titleholder who was crowned Miss Universe Thailand 2020.
- Ann Evans – Canadian Television & Film producer, TV personality, actress and entrepreneur.
- David Usher – British-born Canadian singer-songwriter.
- Marline Yan – Canadian actress and singer.
- Paweensuda Drouin – Thai model, television host, DJ, and beauty pageant titleholder, who was crowned Miss Universe Thailand 2019.
- Pailin Chongchitnan – YouTuber, Chef, TV Show host.
- Nach Dudsdeemaytha – Canadian Film producer and editor, who produced Mongrels (2024).
- Krit Komkrichwarakool – Thai-Canadian writer and director.
