= CBC Podcast Showcase =

Canadian radio program

CBC Podcast Showcase is a radio program broadcast on CBC Radio One, focusing on the Canadian Broadcasting Corporation's original podcast productions. It is hosted by Gavin Crawford.

It features excerpts from the podcasts which include radio documentaries and audio dramas.
