= Laotian Chinese =

Ethnic group

ຄົນລາວຈີນ 老撾華人

Total population
- 185,000; 1 to 2 percent of the Laotian population

Regions with significant populations
- Vientiane • Phonsavan • Luang Prabang • Pakse

Languages
- Lao • Teochew • Hakka • Cantonese • Southwestern Mandarin

Religion
- Theravada Buddhism • Mahayana Buddhism

Related ethnic groups
- Overseas Chinese

The Laotian Chinese (Lao: ຄົນລາວຈີນ, Chinese: 老撾華人) are Laotian citizens of the Han Chinese ancestry. They constitute one of the many Overseas Chinese residing in Southeast Asia. At present, they constitute an estimated 1 to 2 percent of the Laotian population. The Laotian Chinese community have a disproportionately large presence in the Laotian business sector and dominate the Laotian economy today.

== Identity ==
Many modern Laotian Chinese have reinvented themselves to assert a more traditional Chinese identity to more easily create economic links to conduct business between Laos and mainland China.

== Language ==
Many Laotian Chinese families have their children learn Chinese to reaffirm their Chinese identity as Mandarin has been increasingly the primary language of business for Overseas Chinese business communities. The rise of China's global economic prominence has prompted many Laotian Chinese business families to see Mandarin as a beneficial asset to partake economic links to conduct business between Laos and mainland China.

== Migration history ==
Most Laotian Chinese are descendants of older generations who moved down from the Southern China provinces from the 19th century and present. Most have ancestry from the provinces of Guangdong, Yunnan, Guangxi, Sichuan and Guizhou. Laotian Chinese mostly speak Teochew, Hakka and Cantonese but some also speak Southwestern Mandarin from the Chinese provinces of Yunnan, Guizhou as well as Sichuan. Today in Laos, many ethnic Chinese migrants have decided to reside in Laos, making the population rise by a couple of thousands. Many ethnic Chinese were also involved in constructing the 2009 Southeast Asian Games venues held in Vientiane. During the 1970s and 1980s, after the Communist Pathet Lao came into power, some Laotian Chinese fled to Thailand and other countries. The U.S. also has a significant Laotian Chinese population. Many still practice certain Chinese traditions and customs as their ancestors did. Most of the ethnic Chinese in Laos fled the country during the Communist takeover in 1975.

== Trade and industry ==
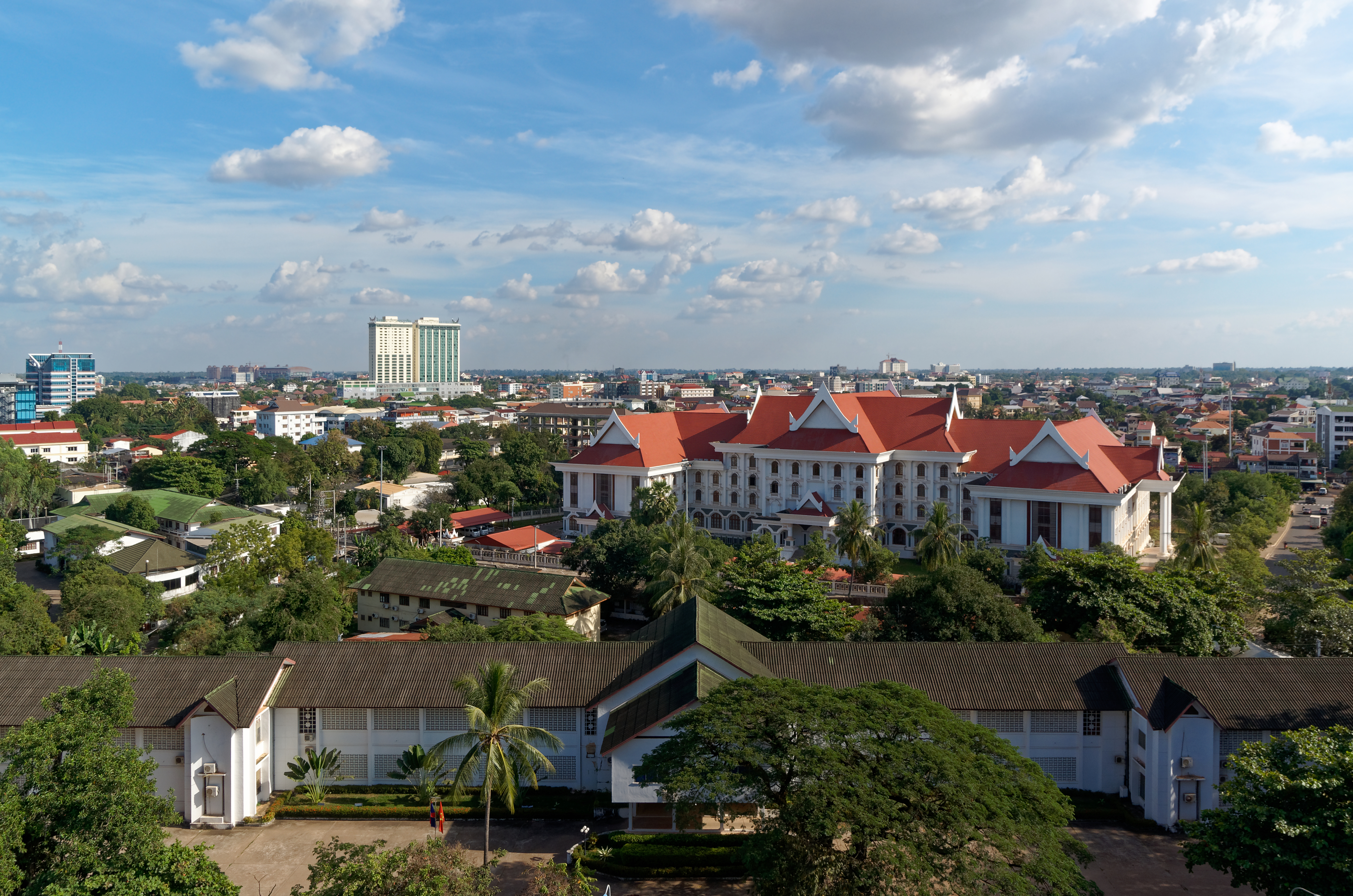
Vientiane continues to be Laos's major financial district and business networking hub for Laotian businessmen and investors of Chinese ancestry. The city is now pullulated with thousands of prospering Chinese-owned businesses, with Vientiane being home to at least 2500 Chinese entrepreneurs who control a vast disproportion of the city's restaurants, cinemas, hotels, repair shops, and jewellery stores.

Like much of Southeast Asia the Chinese dominate Laotian commerce at every level of society. The Laotian Chinese have been found to have much larger economic power over their indigenous Laotian majority counterparts and play a significant role in the country's commercial sector. According to a 2015 presentation by Professor Choi Ho Rim, the contemporary Laotian Chinese are estimated to effectively control approximately 99 percent of the nation's entire economy. Throughout the topography of Laotian commercial life, where the participation of the indigenous Lao within the nation's commercial private sector is deemed to be virtually non-existent. The 1 to 2 percent Laotian Chinese minority plays a disproportionately large role in the country's private business sector and has been quick to captilize on the globalization-induced market opening.

Many Laotian entrepreneurs and investors of Chinese ancestry play a leading role in the Laotian economy specializing in diverse business areas and industry sectors such as shipping, textiles, mining, casinos, bars, nightclubs, banking, construction, airlines, real estate, tobacco, fashion, health clubs and fitness studios, medicinal healing clinics, cannabis and pharmaceutical drug dispensaries, bakeries, catering and patisseries, laundromats and dry cleaners, ice cream parlours, cinemas and movie theatres, car washes, cafes, hotels, lodging houses, department stores, supermarkets, grocers, corner shops, gas stations, spas, commercial printers and photo shops, garden centres and nurseries, tour operators, hotels, cement mixing, restaurants, cafés, teahouses, vehicular dealerships, electrical appliances, heat, ventilating, and air conditioning services, machinery, metal fabricators, retailers, and repair shops. Expatriate Chinese investors from abroad have made inroads by percolating their involvement in various Laotian commercial activity sectors such as food, consumer durables, electronics, automobiles, hospitality, retail, education, consulting, machinery, health care, forestry, fisheries, agriculture, industrial manufacturing, and construction. Since the early 2000s, expatriate Chinese investors have opened hotels, shopping malls, casinos, and restaurants across the country. In the city of Luang Prabang, the largest hotel and the city's lone shopping mall are both owned by Laotian investors of Chinese ancestry. In Vientiane alone, amongst the thousands of prospering Chinese-owned businesses found across the city's commercial business landscape, the enterprising Chinese minority controls a vast disproportionate percentage of the city's restaurants, cinemas, hotels, repair shops, and jewellery stores. Chinese real estate investors are also the city's dominant power players in the local property market as are numerous Chinese construction companies and real estate developers who operate as the city's top dogs in managing, investing, and running some of Vientiane's largest commercial property development projects such as the Sanjiang International Shopping Centre, Vientiane Centre, and Latsavong Square. The Northern section of Kaysone Phomvihane Road is home to numerous Chinese retailers and houses the Chinese-built National Convention Center. ASEM Villa and Don Chan Palace, two of the largest and most prestigious five-star hotels in Vientiane are well known establishments recognized for accommodating expatriate Chinese businessmen. This precedent is eclipsed by the apparent economic influence presided by the presence of numerous Chinese state-owned enterprises operating around the country, two of which happen to be China Railway Group and PowerChina, where both companies are collaborating on numerous infrastructure projects throughout Laos. Since 2021, following the establishment of a US$6 billion high-speed railway linking Laos and China, has resulted in a significant increase of expatriate Chinese merchants entering the Laotian market armed with significant financial capital and expertise. The arrival of such enterprising Chinese merchants following the construction of the railway in the region has enabled them to broaden their business ventures into the hospitality, retail, and food service sectors, while also initiating establishments such as guesthouses, grocery stores, and restaurants, businesses that were traditionally controlled by local Lao merchants. Throughout the flourishing economic hub of Vientiane, businesses owned by Chinese nationals have experienced significant growth, overshadowing at the detriment of Lao-owned businesses, which have inevitably led to their decline and displacement as expatriate Chinese merchants continue to establish and expand their commercial presence throughout the city. The influx of Chinese traders has not only intensified commercial rivalries and increased market saturation, but also the heightened competition spurred on by the enterprising nature of the Chinese have pushed numerous Lao merchants to sell their products in markets located outside the city, while markets within the city limits are dominated by Chinese merchants. Some Lao merchants have observed that Chinese counterparts tend to conduct business among themselves, primarily operating within an insular community by forming an exclusive group based on ethnic ties while retaining their profits within a closed enclave. A number of expatriate Chinese merchants, traders, dealers, investors, as well as prostitutes have also settled down in Golden Boten City. Golden Boten City which initially housed a large casino that has since been abandoned, has experienced an upsurge in large-scale construction of hotels and other commercial properties.

Chinese economic dominance of Laos dates back centuries to the medieval Southeast Asian caravan trade that involved the integration of the medieval Lao Kingdom of Lan Xang into medieval Southeast Asia's regional trade network stemming from its establishment in 1354. By the end of the fifteenth century, the Kingdom of Lan Xang gained its economic efflorescence as a result of the prosperity engendered by the Southeast Asian caravan trade. Expatriate Hui caravan merchants and traders acted as intermediaries between the Laotian highland and lowland as their commercial activities of supplying and collecting from the Laotian highland energized the Kingdom's economy alongside the various Southeast Asian trade routes in addition to reaping the economic prosperity presided by the Chinese which acted as a major tax revenue stream for the Lan Xang monarchy. Numerous goods were traded on the Lanxang and international market ranging from medicinal plants, resins, benzoin, timber, and ivory. In the 19th century precipated by Qing rebellions, political upheavals, and dynastic conflicts sent waves of Han Chinese into Central and Southern Laos. Many of the Han immigrants whom eventually settled down in Vietiane, Pakse, Savannakhet, and Thakhek traced their ancestry to the Southern Chinese provinces of Fujian, Guangdong, and Hainan. Starting off their humble migrant beginnings as coolies for the French Colonial Empire in Laos, the Chinese soon began to flourish and eventually dominated the Laotian economy based on the Confucian paradigm of networking. In order to secure and protect their economic interests, the Chinese banded together along ethnic lines to what the French colonialists denoted as congrégations (huiguan 会馆 or bang 帮). The French colonial economic structure that was utilized as an instrument to extract agricultural produce and the distribution of rudimentary consumer durable goods was nonetheless heavily dependent on the massive labyrinth of business networks controlled by the Chinese middlemen. Laotian entrepreneurs of Chinese ancestry purchased, wholesaled, traded, imported, and exported everything of economic value across the French Indo-Chinese colonies. Dominating the Indo-Chinese trade, the Chinese began to act as compradors for French colonial trading cooperatives as economic preponderance prompted Laotian businessmen of Chinese ancestry to act as financial intermediaries and operating as agents for the French as well as their own. Even more indicative of Chinese economic prowess was their control of the massive system of financial services networks across French Indo-China. Despite their small numbers at the time of French colonialism, the enterprising Chinese dominated the Laotian economy to the point where they controlled all the major industry sectors in the country including banking, industrial manufacturing, and commercial trade. One of the earliest modern forms of Laotian Chinese commodities trading was the purchase of indigenous Lao products from the Laotian countryside, which were then in turn, wholesaled to Laotian Chinese merchants and exporters in the urban areas of Laos. In the constituent domain of international finance and trade within Laos, the Chinese occupy a significant position, with much of the Laotian Chinese commercial activities having been extensively pervasive, as they control 75 percent of Lao's foreign trade in addition to presiding much of the Overseas Chinese investment capital, largely concentrated in 3 of the 4 major Laotian banks. In heavy industry, the Chinese dominate the Laotian industrial manufacturing sector, with dozens of Chinese-owned Laotian industrial manufacturing establishments involved in the production of plastics, monosodium glutamate, textiles, laundry detergent powder, nails, sheet metal, matches, ice, and beverages in addition to the Chinese possessing 70 percent of Laos's aggregate sawmill production capabilities.

In Northern parts of Laos, entrepreneurs and small traders hailing from Yunnan in search of new revenue-generating business and income-producing investment opportunities have come to control and predominate much of the region's commercial business activities and economy. Through much of Northern Laos all the way to Udomxai, the presence of Chinese economic influence is pervasive, with much of the province's and town's shops having come under Chinese hands and young single Chinese merchants seeking to expand their commercial activities across Luang Phrabang and Viang Chan. In most towns across contemporary Northern Laos, much of the local commercial activity has come under Chinese control. In Luang Namtha in northern Laos, recent Chinese migrants dominate the local markets and have since then established large agricultural estates. In other places such as Boten bordering near the Golden Triangle Special Economic Zone, large Chinese enclaves have sprung up with parts of the city being converted into areas of attraction to lure tourists, foreign investors, and gamblers. In the mutual rural-urban vicinities of Northern Laos, a massive influx of Chinese merchants and traders in search of economic opportunities have come to predominate its regional economy following the integration of the Overseas Chinese bamboo network, which was interwoven with key areas including trade nodes encompassing restaurants, marketplaces, and guesthouses. Throughout 2005 to 2006, Chinese merchants and traders have emerged as the country's dominant players carving out new market induced niches across Oudomxay, Muang Sing, and Luang Namtha through setting up shops and peddling cheap Chinese-made clothing, fashion and travel accessories, cosmetics, consumer goods, electrical appliances, and various food items to the indigenous Laotian populace.

In various parts of Northern Laos, Chinese merchants and traders have set up small petty shops and dealerships hawking and supplying cheap Chinese goods and services to the indigenous Laotian masses throughout its rural and urban areas. The Sang Jiang Chinese market that occupies multiple square blocks north of Vientiane's airport has been entirely taken over by petty Chinese shopkeepers supplying and hawking a plethora of cheap Chinese-made products ranging from cooking utensils, porcelain toilets, and television sets to the indigenous Laotian masses. Many of these Chinese-owned establishments range from mobile phone sale centres, electrical items, automobile and tractor engines, television and home furniture sets, barber shops, and beauty salons are found in numerous urban centres and high streets across Northern Laos. As more Chinese traders poured into Laos, supplying cheap Chinese goods to the local indigenous Laotian masses, have completely transformed them into the meretriciously modern and prosperous urban business, financial, and commercial trading centres that they are today, signified by the plethora of Chinese-owned and dominated Laotian marketplaces, stalls, shops, restaurants, and guesthouses that have sprung up throughout various Laotian cities. Within the commercial business district of Muang Xay, a one-kilometre segment of road showcases a proliferation of Chinese-owned auto repair shops, grocery stores, hardware stores, computer shops, guest houses, and restaurants that run along both sides of the street. The Khmu ethnic group, which previously constituted the largest community in Muang Xay, has been surpassed by Chinese investors and traders who now dominate the city's economic activities, resulting in the displacement and marginalization of the Khmu population. Though most Chinese-owned shops specialize in one product area, it is not uncommon for Laotian businessmen and investors of Chinese ancestry to be involved in multiple trade and industry domains such as shipping, even though their primary area of business focus may be a motorcycle dealership or a banana plantation. Moreover, a rising number of hotels, guesthouses, bed-and-breakfast lodges, inns, and restaurants have emerged to accommodate the needs of expatriate Chinese merchant traders, workers, and tourists. These key hospitality establishments and joint stops operating as tourist information centers, dealmaking hubs, mah-jong gambling houses, bus ticket offices, intermediaries, private sightseeing and tour bus operators, and meeting rooms have served as crucial nodes and junctures that are interconnected with the wider Overseas Chinese transnational bamboo network operating across Southeast Asia. Guesthouses and restaurants have been established as key stop areas for Chinese tourists. In a similar vein to their Chinese shop-owner counterparts, guesthouse proprietors and restaurateurs often engage in secondary commercial activities by blending in other additional service offerings such as transportation, shop-keeping, traditional Chinese medicinal clinics, or rubber production. In addition, the owners have also operated as subcontractors and supervisors for prominent expatriate Chinese investors conducting and seeking new business opportunities across the country.

In 1959, 61 percent of all the businesses in seven Laotian towns were controlled by the Chinese. In some cities such Paksane, Luang Prabang and Pakse, the Chinese controlled more than 80 percent all of the businesses. The city of Pakse grew significantly in its commercial importance since the beginning of the mid-twentieth century. In 1959, the Chinese controlled all the hotels throughout the entire city. Prior to the 1975 Communist Revolution as a result of the Laotian Civil War, the Chinese controlled all the city's gold shops. In addition throughout the entire city's 390 known businesses that were operation in 1959, the Chinese owned 372 of them. Throughout the city, the Chinese-owned sawmills, restaurants, hotels, gold shops, commercial printers and photo shops, building materials suppliers, consumer goods companies, cinemas and movie theatres, ice cream parlours, and sweet shops. Some extra entreprenerially-astute and financially-savvy Chinese even accumulated substantial amounts of wealth through the brokerage of various agricultural commodities such as rice, beans, lumber, and coffee. Since 1975, much of the city's economic activities that have been long controlled by Laotians of Chinese ancestry with the number of Chinese-owned gold shops easily exceeding over 100 throughout Pakse prior to the Communist Revolution takeover have declined significantly with the number of Chinese-owned gold shops in Pakse having dwindled to less than ten throughout the latter quarter of the 20th century. In concurrence, the Chinese grip on Pakses's hotel chains and guesthouse markets are no longer dominated by them also. Though the omnipresence of Chinese economic influence is no longer felt throughout the city since the Communist takeover in 1975, Pakse's economic significance still remains relevant as the city is still one of Laos's most important commercial business centres having made its revitalization from the Asian Development Bank in 1990. Despite Pakse witnessing a significant decline in its economic activity and having its commercial reputation ultimately take a hammering and wane throughout the latter quarter of the 20th century, the city today is now seeing a major economic resurgence in reasserting its past commercial relevance in addition to once again having reestablished itself as a leading centre of modern Laotian economic life. Contemporary Pakse is now considered one of country's most important commercial business centres attracting numerous domestic and foreign investors in addition to experiencing a new wave of contemporary Han Chinese immigration hailing from the Southern Chinese provinces of Hunan, Guangdong, Guangxi, and Fujian. Many of these newly settled Han migrants run their own restaurants, guesthouses, ironmongers, and small scale retail stalls hawking and peddling cheap Chinese-made and imported machinery, tools, household implements, mobile phones, electronics, motorcycles, and other consumer goods to the indigenous Lao masses.

The Chinese also pioneered the Laotian agricultural sector whereby acting as intermediaries and agents for mainland Chinese farming companies, have played a major role in the growth and expansion of numerous Laotian agribusinesses ranging from rubber manufacturing, sugarcane farms, fertilizers and seed provisions, dealing with customs, as well as supplying and transporting finished agricultural products to indigenous Lao farmers at superior pricing rates. In 2011, Chinese investors acquired more than 200,000 hectares of agricultural land concessions from the Lao government, constituting 18 percent of the total area granted to all investors throughout the country. Laos today presides over some 66,000 acres of banana farms, much of which has come under the ownership of expatriate Chinese investors due the country's enormous land size and abundance of cheap labour. In Oudomxay, Muang Sing and Luang Namth, Chinese fruit traders dominate the local food markets and have established themselves as the chief suppliers of food to the local Chinese restaurants, displacing indigenous Laotian farmers with cheaper Chinese fruit and vegetable imports in the process. The Chinese are also heavily involved the Laotian agricultural export trade, investing much of their incoming capital in lucrative cash crops such as maize, corn, bananas, cassava, sesame, watermelon and soy beans. Many of these lucrative cash crop exports are produced on farmland rented to Chinese companies along with the plantations that are also owned by them in addition to the inputs supplied by Chinese consumers.

Since the normalization of Sino-Laotian relations in 1987 when the country began to transition into a free-market capitalist oriented economy, numerous Chinese Laotian families that once fled the country have returned to central and southern Laos to reclaim their once lost expropriated assets, businesses, and other property seized by the Lao People's Revolutionary Party. Since the country's transition to a shift to a liberalized free-market capitalist system during the late 1980s, the Laotian Chinese community have begun to reassert their economic dominance and regain much of their economic grip that they once long held in the Laotian private sector. New waves of Han Chinese migration to Laos since the 1990s have led to the resurgence of economic influence long held by the Chinese, many of whom have started their own businesses by operating as small shopkeepers, traders, and hawkers involving in numerous industry sectors in shipping, transportation, computer hardware, tools, household implements, motorcycle repair shops, cell phone stalls, hotels, restaurants, and beauty salons. In order for the community to secure and protect their economic interests, numerous Laotian Chinese entrepreneurs and investors conduct business through a huiguan (会馆) or bang (帮) and the Association of Chinese, a Laotian Chinese community-based organization built along ethnic lines that are responsible for acclimating recent immigrant Chinese or fellow Laotian Chinese entrepreneurs and investors.

The present commercial situation in Laos has led to a resurgence of the Laotian Chinese business community as a result of then Chinese Premier Li Peng's state visit to Vientiane in 1990, increasing trade ties with mainland China as well as the presence of foreign direct investment activity from Overseas Chinese investors operating throughout the neighbouring Southeast Asian countries. Laos's lack of an indigenous Lao commercial business culture with the Laotian private sector that is dominated entirely by Laotian Chinese entrepreneurs and investors themselves has encouraged a significant inflow of mainland Chinese foreign investment capital into the country. The modern Laotian business sector is highly dependent on mainland Chinese and Chinese-owned Laotian companies who control virtually the country's entire economy. An influx of capital from mainland China has led to new construction projects in northern Laos with hydraulic infrastructures, prospecting, high-yield plantations, and textile factories. Of particular note of regard is mainland China's role in the Laotian economy, which has remained as the foremost provider of foreign Chinese investment into Laos as the presence of Chinese investments in Laos is glaringly perceptible as most Chinese-owned Laotian companies and investors that conduct business internationally mainly deal with Laotian, Mainland, and Overseas Chinese investors, who virtually dominate the entirety of contemporary Laotian commerce.

Despite the relatively modest level of economic growth in Laos, the country boasts abundant natural resources. The presence of these valuable resources, coupled with the country's economic growth potential, has proven to be a significant factor in attracting Chinese companies to invest in Laos. Chinese investments in Laos, spanning from small to large-scale projects, have been instrumental in enhancing the economic growth of Laos, helping the country achieve its socioeconomic development objectives, and generating employment opportunities within the country. Between 1989 and 2014, China accounted for a third of Laos's incoming foreign direct investments. Notable initiatives spearheaded by Chinese investment in Laos has been channelled into a variety of significant projects spanning multiple sectors including economic cooperation zones, railway infrastructure, power grid development, hydropower facilities, real estate ventures, and the deployment of a communication satellites. These various projects highlight the substantially diverse contributions made by Chinese investment in Laos across a spectrum of industries and sectors vital for the nation's growth and development.

In 2007, China became Laos's premiere foreign investor, toppling Vietnam and Thailand, with much of the US$2.71 billion worth of foreign direct investment capital making its way into hydropower plant development, mining, shopping centres, restaurants, hotels, banks, rubber plantations, and telecommunications. During the same year, Chinese foreign direct investment in the country amounted to 41 percent of all of the foreign direct investment in Laos with nearly a third of the investment going into hydro-power and the rest making its way in the Laotian mining, rubber manufacturing, telecommunications, construction, hotel, and restaurant sectors. In 2008, Chinese investment in the country rose to $US3.6 billion. Throughout 2012, the bulk of foreign investment in Laos amounted to $US1.34 billion and by 2013, China became Laos's largest foreign investor, numbering over US$5 billion strong. In 2014, China became the largest source of foreign direct investment in Laos totaling some US$5.1 billion. Much of the influx of incoming investment capital went into Laos's mining industries, particularly salt, zinc, iron, gold, copper, and bauxite. Chinese state-owned enterprises such as China National Materials Group, Yuqida Mining Group, China Nonferrous Metal Mining Group, and Aluminum Corporation of China Limited have established a major presence in the Laotian mining and mineral exploration sector, taking part in the exploration, extraction, and exploitation of bauxite in the Bolaven Plateau. Other Chinese state-owned firms including Sinohydro and Shougang Group's subsidiary, Qin Huang Dao Xin He Steel and Mining Development have made development forays in the extraction of iron ore across the Nam Ngum River. In 2018, mainland China accounted for 79 percent of aggregate foreign direct investment into Laos. Chief Chinese investors are Chinese state-owned enterprises and some of mainland China's largest private companies have established a major presence in Laos's agricultural, utility, mining, and hospitality industries. Other commercial industry sectors include casinos, rubber production, tobacco processing, motorbike assemblage, and warehouses. In 2020, Chinese investment in Laos continued to rise, amounting to an aggregate sum totalling US$16 billion since 1989. In July 2022, the inflow of Chinese foreign direct investment into Laos topped US$16 billion spread across over 833 investment projects made of Laotian small, medium, and big state-owned enterprises and Laotian Chinese-owned businesses. China has since then remains Laos's largest investor with much of the investment money having funded the Laos-China railway, the Vientiane-Vangvieng expressway, the Saysettha Development Zone, the Boten-Bohan Special Economic Zone as well as numerous power transmission lines, and hydro-power plants across the country. In 2023, Chinese enterprises made investments exceeding $US986 million, up from the previous year's US$339 million. This surge has led to China emerging as Laos' primary trading partner by the year 2024, with the trade volume between China and Laos experiencing a notable uptick of 27 percent, soaring from $US5.7 billion in 2022 to reach $US7 billion in 2023.

== See also ==
- Chinese folk religion in Southeast Asia
- People's Republic of China – Laos relations
