= Dannabang Kuwabong =

Ghanaian Canadian author, poet and professor

- Born: Nanville, Upper West Region, Ghana
- Education: University of Ghana; York University, Toronto; University of Stirling; McMaster University
- Occupations: Writer and academic

Dannabang Kuwabong is a Ghanaian Canadian author, poet and professor of Caribbean Literature and Culture. He was born in Nanville in the Upper West Region of Ghana. He has written many anthologies and edited academic journals.

== Education ==
Dannabang Kuwabong had his tertiary education at the University of Ghana, where he was awarded a Bachelor of Arts (Honours) degree in English. He also obtained a Magisteriate in Environmental Studies (MES) in Environmental Studies, York University, Toronto, Canada. He further went to the University of Stirling, UK, where he earned his master's degree in Modern Poetry in English and was given a Master of Letters (MLITT). He then went to McMaster University, Hamilton, Canada, to do his doctoral degree in English in 1997

== Achievements ==
He has his works published in ARIEL: A Review of International English Literature, Journal for the Association for Research on Mothering, Journal of Dagaare Studies, La Torre, Sargasso, Canadian Women's Studies /les cahiers de la femmes and Universitas. He co-authored English textbooks for Senior High School English Textbooks I, II, III

== Career ==
He has taught in tertiary institutions such as Rivers State College of Education, Port Harcourt, Nigeria, University of Port Harcourt, University of Ghana and McMaster University, Canada. He is currently a teacher of Caribbean literature at the University of Puerto Rico, San Juan

== Books ==
- Rhetoric of Resistance, Labor of Love: The Ecopoetics of Nationhood in the Poetry and Prose of Lasana M. Sekou. House of Nehesi Publishers, 2025.
- Konga and other Dagaaba Folktales.
- Visions of Venom (poetry)1995
- Echoes from Dusty Rivers (poetry)
- Voices from Kibuli Country (Poem)2003
- Caribbean Blues and Love's Genealogy(Poetry) 2008
- Naa Ko̳nga 1992
- Myth Performance in the African Diasporas(Ritual, Theatre, and Dance) 2013
- Mothers and daughters
- Apocrypha of Nanny's secrets : the rhetoric of recovery in Africaribbean women's poetry 1997
