= Indonesian Canadians =

Indonesian Canadians Orang Kanada Indonesia
Total population
- 28,290 (2021)

Regions with significant populations
- Toronto, Vancouver, Montreal, Victoria, Calgary, Edmonton

Languages
- Indonesian, English, French, Dutch

Religion
- Christianity · Sunni Islam · Irreligion

Related ethnic groups
- Other Asian Canadians: Malaysian Canadians; Singaporean Canadians; Chinese Canadians; Indonesian Americans

Indonesian Canadians are Canadian citizens of Indonesian descent or Indonesia-born people who reside in Canada. They are one of the smaller Asian minorities in Canada.

== Demography ==
In the early post-World War II period, most migrants from Indonesia to Canada were Indo people of mixed Dutch and Native Indonesian ancestry. Many did not come directly from Indonesia, but rather went to the Netherlands and then re-migrated due to racial prejudice they faced there. Community members believe that perhaps 3,000 live in the Ontario area. These migrants tend to be fluent in Dutch, and may also speak Indonesian, or more commonly Indonesian-based trade languages. However, Indonesians of Chinese descent formed the main group in the stream of migration which began in the late 1960s and early 1970s. They have come to comprise an estimated 80% of Canada's population of Indonesian background. Most do not speak any variety of Chinese.

7,610 respondents to the 1991 census stated their place of birth as "Indonesia". Around half of those were settled in the Greater Toronto Area. May 1998 riots in Indonesia also led to several Chinese Indonesians moving to Canada. Data from the 2006 Census suggested that 14,320 people of Indonesian ethnic origin reside in Canada (3,225 single responses, 11,095 in combination with other responses), primarily in Ontario (6,325, or 44%), British Columbia (4,640, or 32%), and Alberta (1,920, or 13%).

== Religion ==
More than half of Indonesian Canadians are believed to be Christians, with roughly equal numbers of Catholics and Protestants. In contrast, although Islam is Indonesia's majority religion, Muslims are estimated to make up only about 10% of Indonesian Canadians, although recent immigrants, from 2010-onwards tend to be Muslims.

An Indonesian Catholic congregation, the Ummat Katholik Indonesia, has been meeting in the Toronto area since 1979; it was first headed by a Dutch priest who had previously lived in Indonesia, and later by a Javanese theology student from the University of Toronto. An inter-denominational Protestant fellowship, the Indonesian Christian Fellowship, also emerged in Toronto in the 1980s.

== Community organisations ==
The first Indonesian community organisations in Canada, the Indonesian-Canadian Association and the Canadian-Indonesian Society, were founded in 1969 in Toronto and Vancouver, respectively. Indonesian consuls' wives also set up branches of Dharma Wanita, a women's group, in various cities. A credit union, Indoka (Indonesian Credit Union) was established in the early 1970s. A group of Muslim and Christian women formed Sanggar Budaya (Culture Workshop), a dance and music group, a few years later. There is also an Indonesian Catholic Organisation comprising mainly ethnic Chinese, as well as INCASEC (Indonesian Canadian Senior Citizens).

Indonesian college students living in Canada are primarily represented through PERMIKA.

== Notable people ==
- Alvin Tedjo, mayor elect of Mississauga
- Darus Suharto, poker player
- Fallon Bowman, guitarist and singer
- Kristin Kreuk, actress
- Lee Kum-Sing, classical pianist
- Mike Hoolboom, filmmaker
- Nikki Chooi, violinist
- Willy Blok Hanson, dancer and choreographer

== See also ==
- Canada–Indonesia relations
- Indonesian diaspora
- Immigration to Canada
- Asian Canadians
- Indonesian Americans
- Indonesian Australians
- Indonesians in the United Kingdom

== Bibliography ==
- Nagata, Judith (1988), "Religion, Ethnicity, and Language: Indonesian Chinese Immigrants in Toronto", Southeast Asian Journal of Social Science, 16 (1): 116–131, doi:10.1163/080382488X00072
- Nagata, Judith (1999), "Indonesians", in Magocsi, Paul R. (ed.), Encyclopedia of Canada's Peoples, University of Toronto Press, pp. 722–726, ISBN 978-0-8020-2938-6, archived from the original on 2009-03-03
- Schryer, Frans J. (1998), "Dutch Indonesians in Ontario", The Netherlandic presence in Ontario: pillars, class and Dutch ethnicity, Wilfrid Laurier University Press, pp. 154–162, ISBN 978-0-88920-262-7
- Citizenship (5), Place of Birth (272), Immigrant Status and Period of Immigration (11), Age (12) and Sex (3) for the Population in Private Households of Canada, Provinces and Territories, Census Metropolitan Areas and Census Agglomerations, 2016 Census - 25% Sample Data, 2017-10-25
