= Igbo Canadians =

Canadians of Igbo descent

Total population
- 18,315

Regions with significant populations
- Vancouver, Toronto, Calgary, Montreal, Edmonton, Quebec City, Ontario

Languages
- Igbo, English, French

Religion
- Christianity

Related ethnic groups
- Igbo people, Nigerian Canadians, Igbo Americans, Nigerian Americans

Igbo Canadians are citizens of Canada that are of full or partial Igbo descent. The Igbo are an ethnic group from Nigeria. According to the 2016 Canadian census, the number of people who identified as Igbo was 18,315. Some Igbo people may have identified as Nigerian. There were 51,835 people who self identified as Nigerian Canadian in the 2016 census. Additionally, 18,315 people identified Igbo as their mother tongue and 8,850 people said that they had some knowledge of Igbo. Many are descendants of African American slaves who escaped using the Underground Railroad with some coming from West Africa and the diaspora.
