= Malaysian Canadians =

Orang Kanada Malaysia اورڠ کناڈا مليسيا 马来西亚裔加拿大人 (Chinese) மலேசிய கனடியர்கள் (Tamil)

Total population
- 16,920 (2016)

Regions with significant populations
- Ontario, British Columbia

Languages
- Canadian English • Canadian French • Malay • Chinese • Tamil and others

Religion
- Islam • Christianity • Buddhism • Taoism • Hinduism

Related ethnic groups
- Indonesian Canadians, Singaporean Canadians

Malaysian Canadians are (Malay: Orang Kanada Malaysia, Jawi: اورڠ کناڈا مليسيا) Canadian citizens who are of Malaysian descent. The 2016 Canada Census recorded 16,920 people self-identifying as Malaysian Canadian or of at least some Malaysian descent, but only 1 820 of these self-identified as solely Malaysian Canadian. Earlier Canada 2001 Census recorded 20,420 first-generation Malaysian Canadians, 8,660 of whom lived in Ontario.

== Notable Malaysian Canadians ==
- Former Canadian Prime Minister Justin Trudeau claims to be of Malaysian descent, through the parent of William Farquhar's wife.
- Yuen Pau Woo, member of the Senate of Canada
- Osric Chau, actor

== See also ==
- Asian Canadians
- Canada–Malaysia relations
