= Cambodian Canadians in the Greater Toronto Area =

Toronto's Cambodian population consists of 6,430 ethnic Cambodian people. In 1999, 98% of Cambodians in Toronto identified themselves as Khmer people.

Cambodians first arrived in Canada as a result of the 1970s Cambodian genocide, a four-year period in which nearly 2 million Cambodians were murdered. Their community would originate in Jane and Finch, and as they diversified in profession and status, many relocated into other cities such as Vaughan, Newmarket, and Hamilton.

== Geography ==
In 1999 McLellan wrote that "In Toronto most live in one area which is characterized by low income and subsidized housing." As of 2010 the main areas of Cambodian settlement are the following intersections: Broadview Avenue and Gerrard Street, Finch Avenue and Jane Street, Jane street and Woolner Avenue; in addition many Cambodians live along Driftwood Avenue, Finch Avenue, Gosford Boulevard, London Green, and Regent Park.

== Institutions ==
In 1981 the Cambodian Association opened with the help of grants given from the federal and provincial governments. The association did not cooperate with other Cambodian community groups, nor did it cooperate with the Khmer Buddhist groups. The Cambodian Association assisted newly arrived Cambodians to help them settle in Canada.

== Religion ==
As of 2010 the majority of the Cambodians in Toronto are Buddhist. Cambodians of Christian and Muslim faiths are minorities in their community.

As of 1999, McLellan wrote that historically older men have performed "much of the Buddhist involvement in Toronto" and that for Cambodian women in Toronto "new concepts of self-expression, service to their community, or leadership opportunities in Buddhist contexts have not been developed." As of 1999 Cambodian Buddhist monks do not engage in conversation with women, or stay alone with them, or touch women in a casual manner due to prohibitions from their interpretation of the religion.

As of 1999 Cambodian Buddhism cultural activities are held in school auditoriums and halls. This is because the primary Cambodian temple is in a neighborhood that does not want activities from the Cambodian community to occur there; in previous occasions this was the case because the former temple was not large enough to hold such activities.

Some Cambodians are Christian. Denominations include Seventh-day Adventist, Catholicism, and Protestantism.
