= Laotian Canadians =

Canadians of Laotian origin or descent

ຄົນລາວແຄນາດາ

Total population
- 24,580 (2016)

Languages
- Lao, Tai-Kadai, Hmong, Canadian French, Canadian English

Religion
- Theravada Buddhism, Mahayana Buddhism, Laotian folk religion

Related ethnic groups
- Lao people, Isan people, Shan people, Thai people, Ahom people and Asian Canadians

Laotian Canadians (Lao: ຄົນລາວແຄນາດາ), are Canadian citizens of Laotian origin or descent. In the 2016 Census, 24,580 people indicated Laotian ancestry. Bilateral relations between Canada and Laos were established in 1954 with the formalization of the independence of the Kingdom of Laos from France.

In August 2015, Canada's first resident diplomat opened the Office of the Embassy of Canada in Vientiane, Laos. The physical office was officially inaugurated by Canadian Foreign Minister Stéphane Dion on July 25, 2016.

The term Laotian is wide, as it can refer either to the people born in Laos, including its many ethnicities [49 are recognized by Laos] (the Hmong people per example) or, the real term for the majority Lao Loum (constituting 69% of the country) that is simply Lao.

The “S” in Laos is silent in pronunciation. It was added as the plural of Lao during the French unification of the many Lao states in 1947 to form the Kingdom of Laos (unified from the Kingdom of Luang Phrabang, the Kingdom of Vientiane, the Kingdom of Champassak, and the principality of Muan Phuang. All were previously ruled by Siam. Before that, they were part of the first Lao Kingdom of Lan Xang.)

Today, many Lao Canadians (similarly to Lao Americans and Laotians in France) claim royal ancestry of the main dynasty of Khun Lo, such as the House of Champassak, in these former states.

Lao people have similar food, culture and language to the Thai of Thailand. Across Canada, restaurants serving Thai food are usually owned by Lao people or the ethnic Isan people. (See the famous Green papaya salad)

Most Lao still refer to themselves as Tai (not to be confused with Thai from Thailand), but from the large sub-group of the Tai people. A distinct Lao identity first appeared during the major loss of the Khorat Plateau in 1778 when the Rattanakosin Kingdom (Siam) took over Vientiane. It was reinforced with the Lao rebellion (1826–1828) against Siamese rule. After the independence attempt failed, Rama III implemented forced tattooing to identify the ethnic Lao population. He also accelerated a huge population transfer into what is today Thailand.

The term Lao people was officially proclaimed during French colonial rule when all states were unified in 1904. This distinguished them from the Thai people of Thailand.

== Language ==
Most Lao speak French because they were once under the French protectorate of Laos. But many also speak English as well as Spanish (often recent immigrants from Posadas in Misiones, Argentina. See Asian Argentines).

The French spoken in Laos (Also called the Lao créole) is based on standard Parisian French but has some minor differences in vocabulary as in other French dialects of Asia. Today, the French spoken in Laos is slightly different from French learned during the colonial period, giving them a little hard time translating in the homeland.

Many Lao can also speak and understand Thai, Northern Thai language, Phuan language and Isan. Other dialects related to the Kra-dai languages are also understood, such as Tai Dam language in Viet Nam, Shan in Myanmar, Ahom in Assam, India, Meitei in Manipur, India, and Chittagong, Bangladesh as well as Dai of the Xishuangbanna Dai Autonomous Prefecture in China.

There are also notable communities of Laotian Chinese that speak the teochew dialect and Lao with Thai-Persian heritage clustered around Canadian cities. (See the Iranians in Thailand) These groups came as a result of the Laotian Civil War fleeing the communist takeover.

== Migration to Canada ==
The Laotian Civil War, also infamously known as the Secret War by the CIA, sparked the emigration of thousands of Lao. It was a brutal war between the Communist Pathet Lao and the Royal Lao Army. From 1964 to 1973, the U.S. dropped more than two million tons of ordnance on Laos during 580,000 bombing missions—equal to a planeload of bombs every eight minutes, 24-hours a day, for nine years – making Laos the most heavily bombed country per capita in history.

Mass migration from Laos to Cambodia peaked in the late 1970s and early 1980s, consisting of both government-sponsored and privately sponsored refugees from camps in Thailand, where they had fled to due to the Laotian Civil War and the final victory of the Pathet Lao. Between the 1970s and early 1980s many Canadian families, especially in Quebec, sponsored many Lao. But by the 1990s, most refugees in the camps were instead repatriated to Laos. Canada took in 12,793 Laotian refugees.

The Lao community is well assimilated to Canadian culture especially in the province of Quebec. This resulted in many mixed couples having children of mixed heritage.

== Demography ==
Most migrants consisted of young families; there were few elderly among them. A significant proportion were drawn from among the community of ethnic Chinese in Laos.

Most of the communities are settled in and more often outside of big Canadians cities such as Burnaby and Surrey in British Columbia, Kitchener, Ontario, where 995 Laotian Canadians live (0.004% of its population), Markham and Calgary. In Quebec, most live in Saint-Michel (Montreal).

== Demographics ==
Population by ancestry by Canadian province or territory (2016)
Province	Population	Percentage	Source
Ontario	9,875	0.1%	
Quebec	7,625	0.1%	
British Columbia	2,530	0.1%	
Alberta	2,050	0.1%	
Manitoba	1,730	0.1%	
Saskatchewan	710	0.1%	
Newfoundland and Labrador	25	0.0%	
Nova Scotia	10	0.0%	
New Brunswick	10	0.0%	
Northwest Territories	0	0.0%	
Nunavut	0	0.0%	
Prince Edward Island	0	0.0%	
Yukon	0	0.0%	
Canada	24,580	0.1%	

== Religion ==
=== Buddhism ===
Laotian migrants in Canada mostly follow Theravada Buddhism with a mixture of animism also known as Tai folk religion, though Mahayana Buddhists are also found among those of Laotian Chinese ethnicity.

In 1990, British Columbia had no Laotian Buddhist temple; the nearest was a Laotian American temple in Seattle. Within Canada, Laotian Buddhist temples have been opened in Sainte-Julienne, Montreal, Quebec, Toronto, Ontario, and Winnipeg, Manitoba.

=== Christianity ===
There are perhaps 500 Christians, most of whom converted while living in refugee camps. Christianity is spreading within the community. Recent immigrants from Posadas, Argentina of Lao descent mostly follows Roman Catholicism.

== See also ==
- Asian Canadians
