= Singaporean Canadians =

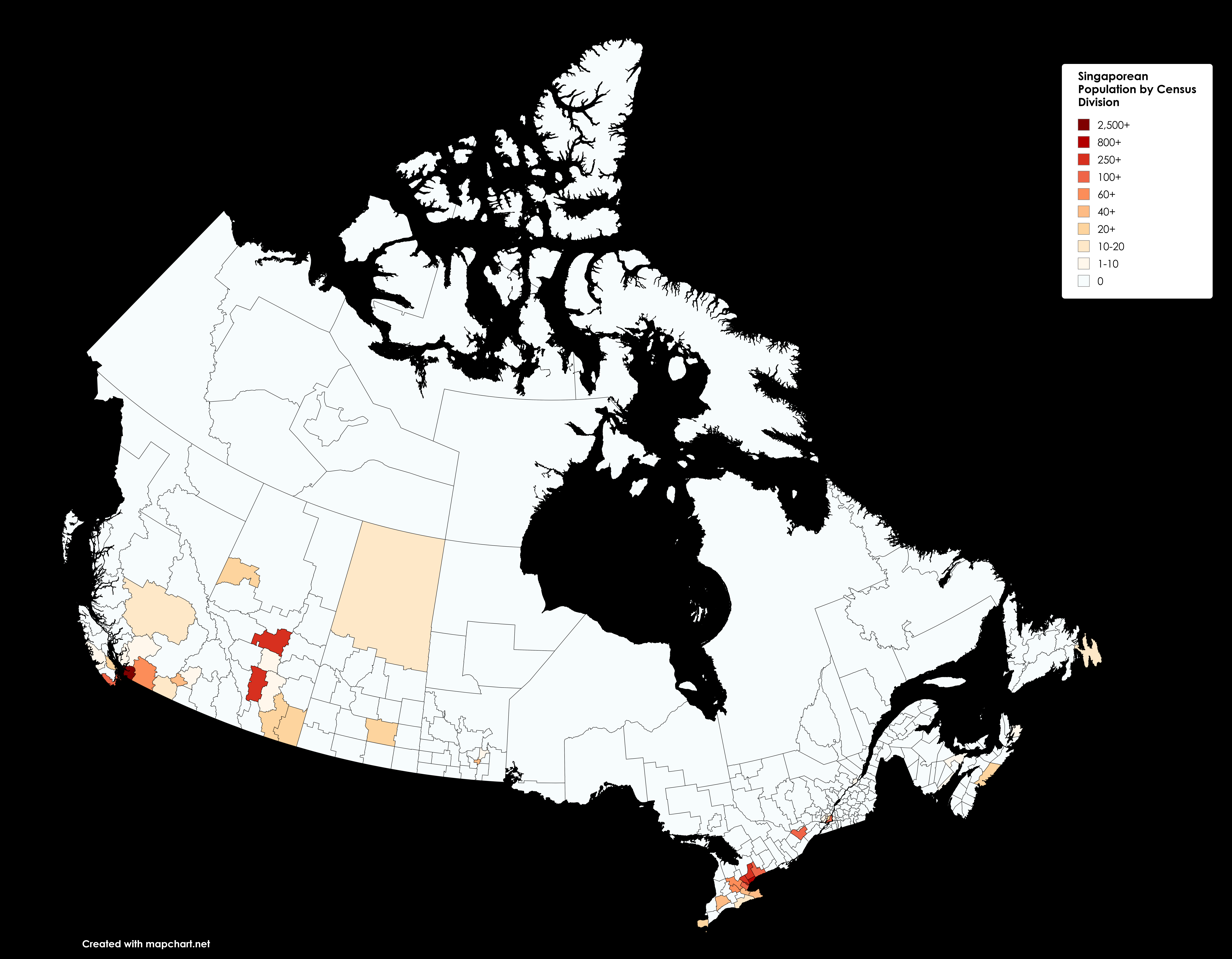
- Population distribution in Canada of Singaporean-Canadians based on 2021 Canadian Census data.

Total population
- 6,060 (2021)

Regions with significant populations
- Toronto; Vancouver; Edmonton

Languages
- English; Malay; Mandarin; Tamil; French

Religion
- Buddhism; Christianity; Islam; Taoism; Hinduism

Related ethnic groups
- Singaporeans; Overseas Singaporean

Singaporean Canadians are Canadians of Singaporean descent.

There is a small community of Singaporeans in Canada, consisting largely of expatriate professionals and immigrants from Singapore and their families, as well as international students.

== Migration history ==
During the 1970s, arrivals to Canada from Singapore numbered less than 100 per year while in the following decade, immigrants born in Singapore averaged between 200 and 400. In the years 1989–91, arrivals from Singapore approached 1,000.

Many Singaporeans are employed by Canadian companies or in the public sector, including universities. They also figure prominently among medical doctors, accountants, engineers and architects. Approximately one-third are self-employed and have entered Canada under that category or as entrepreneurs. Most of their businesses are urban-based and often have a highly technical focus, such as computers or chemical and engineering products. Most Singaporeans in Canada tend to retain their citizenship in anticipation of possible return.

Between 1987 and 1991, some 1,500 to 1,800 Singaporean students were living in Canada.

== Notable people ==
- Justin Trudeau – former Prime Minister of Canada, 5x great-grandson of William Farquhar, the 1st Resident of Singapore.
- Angela Lee – Mixed martial arts extreme sport
- Christian Lee – Mixed martial arts fighter
- Yuen Pau Woo – Politician
- Thea Lim – Writer
- Shin Lim – Magician
- Goh Poh Seng – Dramatist, novelist and poet
- Victor Oh – Politician
- Lawrence Mok – Politician

== See also ==
- Canada–Singapore relations
