= European Canadians =

Canadians of European ancestry

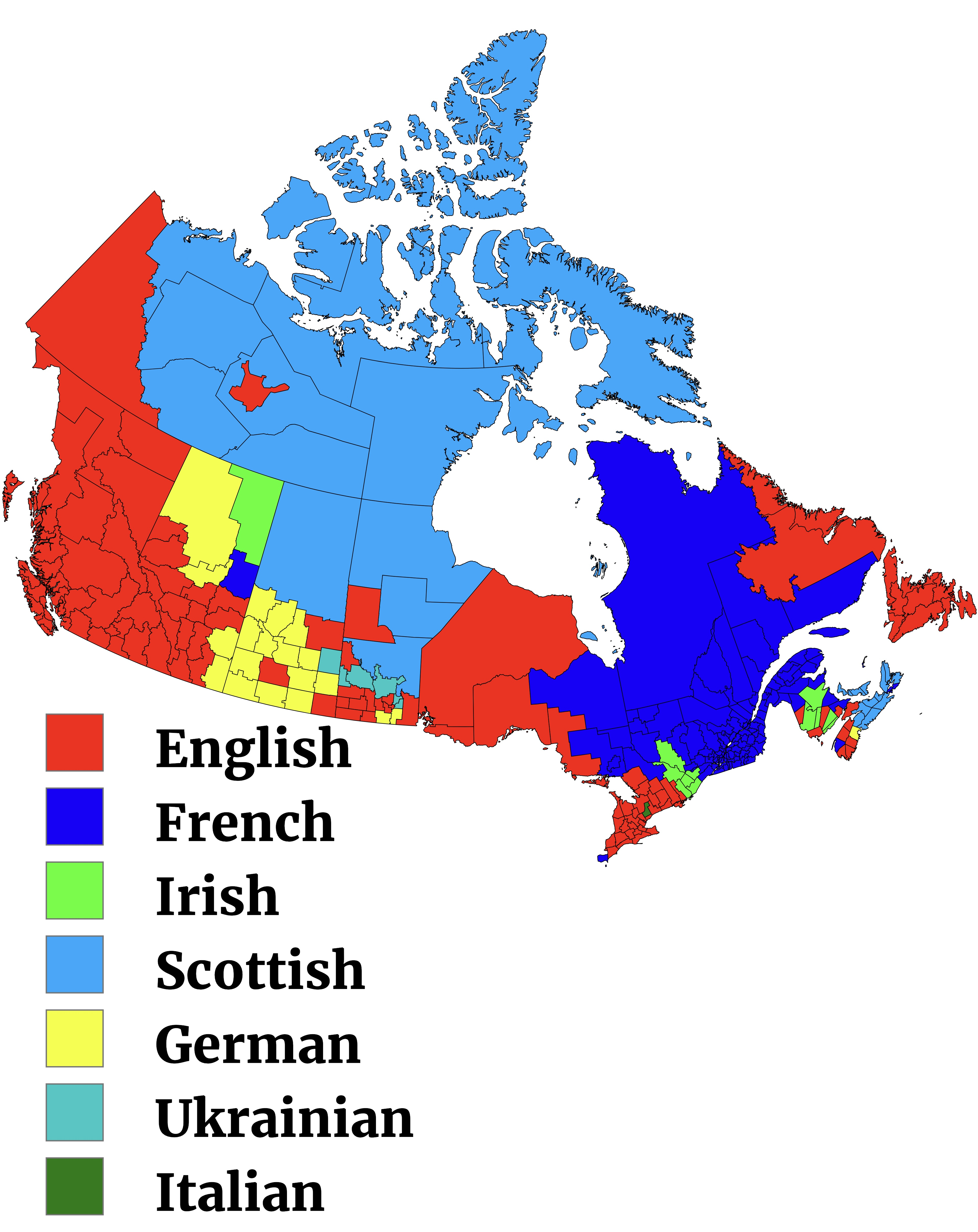
- Largest reported European ancestry in Canada by census division, 2021 census

Total population
- 19,062,115 (2021 census); 52.5% of the Canadian population (as self-identified by census respondents)

Regions with significant populations
- All areas of Canada less prevalent in Northern Canada

Languages
- English; French; Italian; German; Polish; Ukrainian; Portuguese; Other European Languages; Historically: Scottish Gaelic · Irish

Religion
- Christianity (58.54%) (Note: Including Roman Catholicism, Protestantism, Eastern Orthodoxy, Oriental Orthodoxy, Mormonism, Other Latter Day Saints, Nondenominational and Other Christians); Irreligion (39.19%); Judaism (0.94%); Islam (0.36%); Buddhism (0.16%); Indigenous Spirituality (0.07%); Hinduism (0.04%); Sikhism (0.02%); Others (0.69%))

Related ethnic groups
- European diaspora, Europeans, European Americans, European Australians, European New Zealanders, British (English, Scottish, Welsh, Northern Irish), Irish, French, German, Italian, Dutch, Russian, Ukrainian, Polish, Portuguese

European Canadians are Canadians who can trace their ancestry from Europe, forming the largest panethnic group within Canada. In the 2021 Canadian census, 19,062,115 people or 52.5% of the population self-identified ethnic origins from Europe. People may nominate more than one ethnic origin in the census.

== Terminology ==
"Euro-Canadians" and "European Canadians" are terms primarily used by those opposed to immigration to Canada from the Third World, and their use has been criticized as conflating distinctions between very different European groups and nationalities. Those employing the terms can recognize that most Canadians of European descent do not see that as their collective identity and instead identify with a specific ethnicity or country of ancestral origin, characterizing themselves as for example "Anglo" or "Québecois" rather than as part of a larger "Euro-Canadian" group. For most of the history of European settlement in North America, the French and the English were seen as two distinct races, with distinct cultures and national spirits.

As with other panethnic groups, Statistics Canada records ethnic ancestry by employing the term "European origins" under the ethnic origin population section in the census data, but does not specifically use the term "European Canadian". Statistics Canada has cautioned that "the reporting of ethnicity, and subsequent interpretation of the results, has become increasingly complex due to a number of factors, and poses challenges for historical data comparisons. The concept of ethnicity is fluid and is probably one of the more complex concepts measured in the census." As well, patterns of self-reporting ethnic origins on the census vary with different population groups in Canada, with particular fluidity on self-reporting of the category "Canadian". Use of statistics in this subject area must be approached with these cautions in mind. The sum of the identified ethnic groups is greater than the total population estimate, because a person may report more than one ethnic origin in the census.

== Subgroups ==
There are several subgroups of Canadians of European ancestry, identified according to their, or their ancestors', country of origin. Although loosely defined, these categories have been utilized widely in ethnic and cultural identification, particularly in diasporas, such as the European diasporas of Canada.

Ethnic categorization of European in Canada (Southern & Southeast together in map)

Statistics Canada does not use the term "European Canadian". The 2021 census asked individuals to self-identify their ethnic origins, within seven general categories (subcategories shown for clarity):

- British Isles origins, including British Canadians (Cornish Canadians, English Canadians, Scottish Canadians, and Welsh Canadians) and Irish Canadians
- French origins, including French Canadians (Breton Canadians)
- Other Western European origins, including Austrian Canadians, Belgian Canadians, Dutch Canadians, German Canadians, Luxembourgish Canadians, and Swiss Canadians
- Northern European origins, including Danish Canadians, Finnish Canadians, Icelandic Canadians, Norwegian Canadians, and Swedish Canadians
- Southern European origins, including Greek Canadians, Italian Canadians, Maltese Canadians, Portuguese Canadians, and Spanish Canadians (Basque Canadians)
- Southeast European origins, including Albanian Canadians, Bosnian Canadians, Bulgarian Canadians, Croatian Canadians, Macedonian Canadians, Montenegrin Canadians, Romanian Canadians, Serbian Canadians, and Slovenian Canadians
- Eastern European origins, including Belarusian Canadians, Czech Canadians, Estonian Canadians, Hungarian Canadians, Latvian Canadians, Lithuanian Canadians, Polish Canadians, Russian Canadians, Slovak Canadians, and Ukrainian Canadians

== History ==
The exploration of Canada by European nations commenced with the Norse in the late 10th century along the East Coast. After Jacques Cartier's arrival in 1534, British and French explorers progressively ventured westward over the subsequent three centuries.

=== 16th century ===
English Canadian history starts with the attempts to establish English settlements in Newfoundland in the sixteenth century. The first English settlement in present-day Canada was at St. Johns Newfoundland, in 1583. Newfoundland's population was significantly influenced by Irish and English immigration, much of it as a result of the migratory fishery in the decades prior to the Great Famine of Ireland.

The first recorded Irish presence in the area of present-day Canada dates from 1536, when Irish fishermen from Cork traveled to Newfoundland.

=== 17th century ===
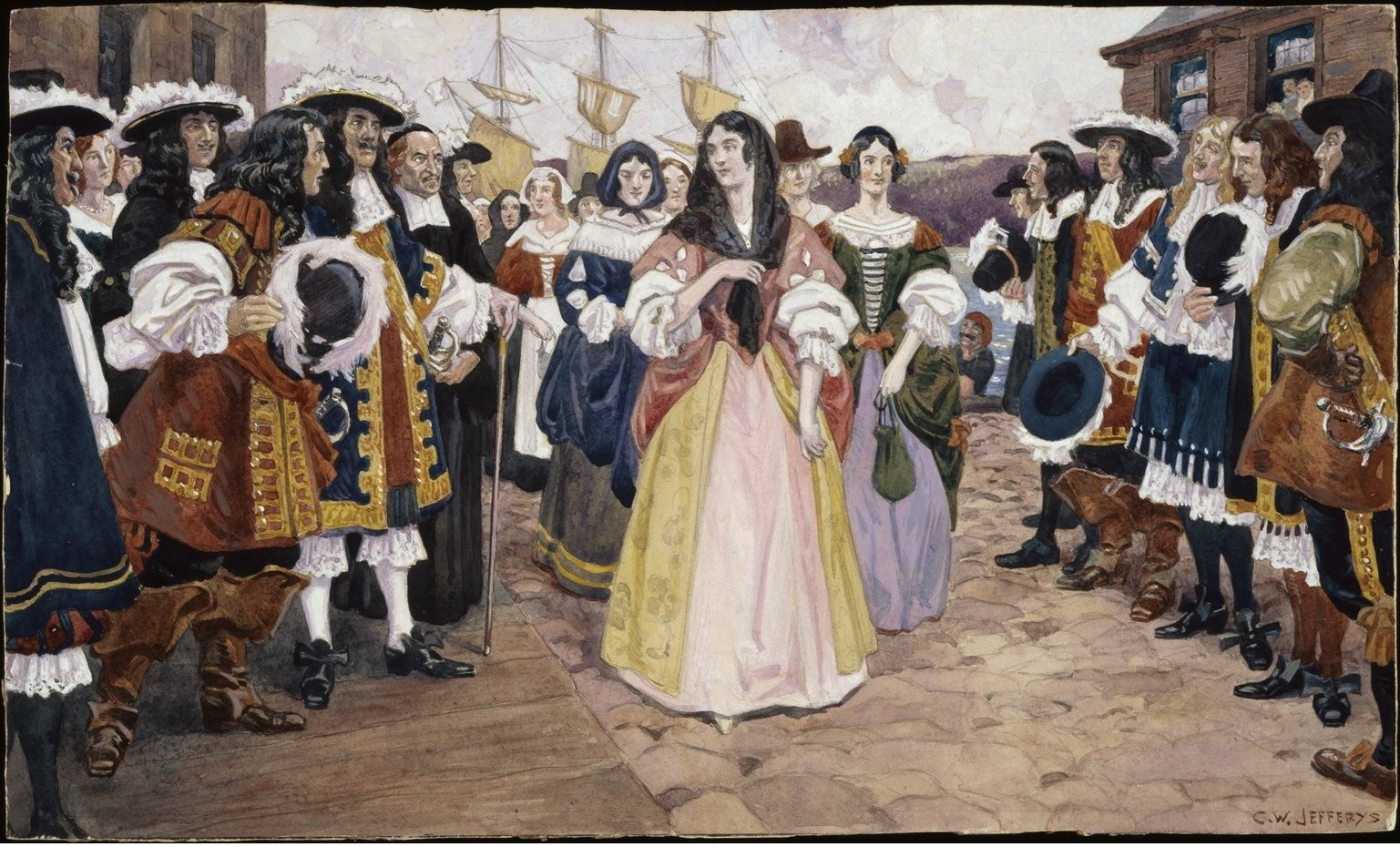
One group of King's Daughters arrives at Quebec, 1667

The French were the first Europeans to establish a continuous presence in what is now Canada. French settlers from Normandy, Perche, Beauce, Brittany, Maine, Anjou, Touraine, Poitou, Aunis, Angoumois, Saintonge and Gascony were the first Europeans to permanently colonize what is now Quebec, parts of Ontario, Acadia, and select areas of Western Canada, all in Canada (see French colonization of the Americas) .Their colonies of New France (also commonly called Canada) stretched across what today are the Maritime provinces, southern Quebec and Ontario, as well as the entire Mississippi River Valley.

Hélène Desportes is considered the first child with European ancestry to be born in New France. She was born circa 1620, to Pierre Desportes (born Lisieux, Normandie, France) and Françoise Langlois.

The first permanent European settlements in Canada were at Port Royal in 1605 and Quebec City in 1608 as fur trading posts. The territories of New France were Canada, Acadia (later renamed Nova Scotia), and Louisiana. The inhabitants of the French colony of Canada (modern-day Quebec) called themselves the Canadiens, and came mostly from northwestern France. The early inhabitants of Acadia, or Acadians (Acadiens), came mostly but not exclusively from the southwestern regions of France.

Canadien explorers and fur traders would come to be known as coureurs des bois and voyageurs, while those who settled on farms in Canada would come to be known as habitants. Many French Canadians are the descendants of the King's Daughters (Filles du Roi, several hundred women who immigrated over a decade under the sponsorship of Louis XIV). A few also are the descendants of mixed French and Algonquian marriages (see also Metis people and Acadian people).

=== 18th century ===
==== Early to mid-century ====
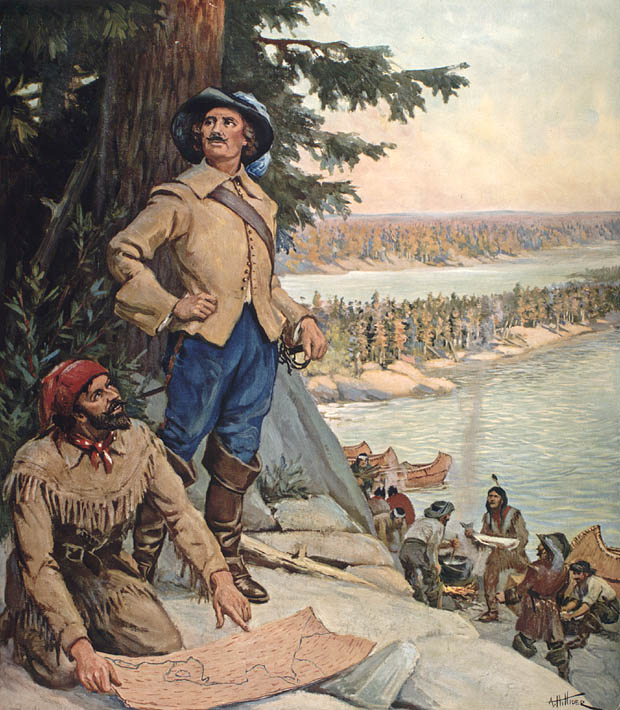
Jean Baptiste de La Vérendrye of New France with a group of engagés (indentured servants)

The area that forms the present day province of Nova Scotia was contested by the British and French in the eighteenth century. French settlements at Port Royal, Louisbourg and what is now Prince Edward Island were seized by the British. After the 1713 Treaty of Utrecht ceded the French colony of Acadia (today's mainland Nova Scotia and New Brunswick) to Great Britain, efforts to colonize the province were limited to small settlements in Canso and Annapolis Royal.

In 1749, Colonel Edward Cornwallis was given command of an expedition for the settlement of Chebucto by some three thousand persons, many of whom were Cockney. Cornwallis' settlement, Halifax, would become the provincial capital, the primary commercial centre for the Maritime provinces, a strategic British military and naval outpost and an important east coast cultural centre. To offset the Catholic presence of Acadians, foreign Protestants (mainly German) were given land and founded Lunenburg. Nova Scotia itself saw considerable immigration from Scotland, particularly to communities such as Pictou in the northern part of the province and to Cape Breton Island, beginning with the arrival of 189 Highlanders on the sailing ship Hector in 1773.

A few Germans came to New France when France colonized the area, but large-scale migration from Germany began only under British rule, when Governor Edward Cornwallis established Halifax, Nova Scotia in 1749. Known as the Foreign Protestants, the continental Protestants were encouraged to migrate to Nova Scotia between 1750 and 1752 to counterbalance the large number of Catholic Acadians. Family surnames, Lutheran churches, and village names along the South Shore of Nova Scotia retain their German heritage, such as Lunenburg. The first German church in Canada, the Little Dutch (Deutsch) Church in Halifax, is on land which was set aside for the German-speaking community in 1756. The church was designated a National Historic Site of Canada in 1997.

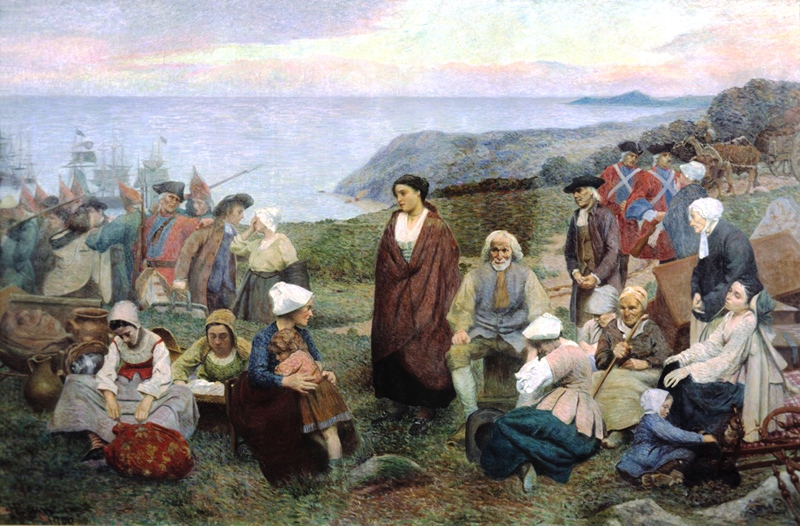
Expulsion of the Acadians in 1755

After the fall of New France to the British in 1759, a colonial governing class established itself in Quebec City. Larger numbers of English-speaking settlers arrived in the Eastern Townships and Montreal after the American Revolution.

A large group of Ulster Scots, many of whom had first settled in New Hampshire, moved to Truro, Nova Scotia in 1761.

New Brunswick became the home for many Scots. In 1761 a Highland regiment garrisoned Fort Frederick. The surrounding lands surveyed by Captain Bruce in 1762 attracted many Scottish traders when William Davidson of Caithness arrived to settle two years later. Their numbers were swelled by the arrival of thousands of loyalists of Scottish origin both during and after the American Revolution. One of the New Brunswick and Canada's most famous regiments was "The King's First American Regiment" founded in 1776. It was composed mostly of Highlanders, many of whom fought with their traditional kilts to the sound of bagpipes. The regiment distinguished itself when it defeated Washington's forces at the Battle of Brandywine. When it disbanded after the War, most of its members settled in New Brunswick.

In 1772 a wave of Gaels began to arrive in Prince Edward Island, and in 1773 the ship Hector brought 200 Gaels to Pictou, beginning a new stream of Highland emigration – the town's slogan is "The Birthplace of New Scotland". At the end of the 18th century, Cape Breton Island had become a centre of Scottish Gaelic settlement, where only Scottish Gaelic was spoken.

After the American Revolution, Americans who identified with the British Crown left the United States for Canada, some fleeing the hostility of their revolutionary neighbours, others lured by easily available land and lower taxes. The majority of the United Empire Loyalists were of European birth or descent, although the group also included a significant number of African Americans.

Furthermore a number of Scottish loyalists to the British crown, who had fled the United States in 1783, arrived in Glengarry County (in eastern Ontario) and Nova Scotia.

==== Late 18th century ====
Prince Edward Island (PEI) was also heavily influenced by Scottish Gaelic settlers. One prominent settler in PEI was John MacDonald of Glenaladale, who conceived the idea of sending Gaels to Nova Scotia on a grand scale after Culloden. The name Macdonald still dominates on the island, which received a large influx of settlers, predominantly Catholics from the Highlands, in the late 18th century.

The history of English Canadians is bound to the history of English settlement of North America, and particularly New England, because of the resettlement of many Loyalists following the American Revolution in areas that would form part of Canada. Many of the fifty thousand Loyalists who were resettled to the north of the United States after 1783 came from families that had already been settled for several generations in North America and were from prominent families in Boston, New York and other east coast towns. Although most were of Scottish and English ancestry, these settlers had also intermarried with Huguenot and Dutch colonists and were accompanied by Loyalists of African descent. Many others were German – including Hessian mercenaries who had fought for the Crown – with smaller numbers of Dutch, French, Welsh, Swiss, Danes and Swedes. Dispossessed of their property at the end of the Revolutionary War, the Loyalists arrived as refugees to settle primarily along the shores of southern Nova Scotia, the Bay of Fundy and the Saint John River and in Quebec to the east and southwest of Montreal. The colony of New Brunswick was created from western part of Nova Scotia at the instigation of these new English-speaking settlers. The Loyalist settlements in southwestern Quebec formed the nucleus of what would become the province of Upper Canada and, after 1867, Ontario.

At the end of the 18th century, Cape Breton Island had become a centre of Scottish Gaelic settlement, where only Scottish Gaelic was spoken. Throughout the 18th and 19th centuries, Canadian Gaelic was spoken as the first language in much of "Anglophone" Canada, such as Nova Scotia, Prince Edward Island, and Glengarry County in Ontario. Gaelic was the third most commonly spoken language in Canada.

In the late 18th century, British colonies in North America were significantly affected by the outbreak and subsequent loss of the American Revolutionary War. At the time, Great Britain and its overseas empire were ruled by the German-descended King George III, who was also the Prince-Elector of Hanover, a state in what is now northwestern Germany. Notably, a number of soldiers fighting on what modern historiography terms the pro-British side of the conflict were members of regiments hired from various small German states. These soldiers were collectively known as "Hessians", since many of them came from Hesse. Following the defeat of British forces in the Revolutionary War, about 2,200 of them settled in Canada once their terms of service had expired or they had been released from American captivity. For example, a group from the Brunswick Regiment settled southwest of Montreal and south of Quebec City. In this, they formed part of a larger population movement composed of several waves of migration northward from the newly founded United States to Upper and Lower Canada. In traditional Canadian historiography, these migrants are often grouped together under the broad label of United Empire Loyalists, obscuring particular ethnic and religious identities, as well as their exact motivations for migrating to Canada.

Welsh mapmaker David Thompson was one of the great explorers of the North West Company in the late 18th and early 19th centuries, and is often called "Canada's Greatest Geographer". He covered 130,000 kilometres on foot and surveyed most of the Canada–United States border in the early days of exploration.

=== 19th century ===
==== Early century ====
Upper Canada was a primary destination for English, Scottish and Scots-Irish settlers to Canada in the nineteenth century, and was on the front lines in the War of 1812 between the British Empire and the United States. The province also received immigrants from non-English-speaking sources such as Germans, many of whom settled around Kitchener (formerly called Berlin). Ontario would become the most populous province in the Dominion of Canada at the time of Confederation, and, together with Montreal, formed the country's industrial heartland and emerged as an important cultural and media centre for English Canada.

English, Scottish, and Irish communities established themselves in Montreal throughout the 1800s. Montreal became Canada's largest city and commercial hub until surpassed by Toronto the following century.

In the early 19th century, a large group of Germans (Mennonites) fled the United States. Many of their families' ancestors had been from southern Germany or Switzerland. They began to move to what is now southwestern Ontario and settled around the Grand River, especially in Berlin, Ontario (now Kitchener) and in the northern part of what later became Waterloo County, Ontario. The same geographic area also attracted new German migrants from Europe, roughly 50,000 between the 1830 and 1860. Research indicates that there was no apparent conflict between the Germans from Europe and those who came from Pennsylvania.

Another large group of Scottish Gaels immigrated to Canada and settled in Prince Edward Island in 1803. This migration, primarily from the Isle of Skye, was organized by the Earl of Selkirk, Lord Thomas Douglas, 5th Earl of Selkirk. The Earl, who was sympathetic to the plight of the dispossessed crofters (tenant farmers in the Highlands), brought 800 colonists to Prince Edward Island. In 1811, he founded the Red River Colony as a Scottish colonization project on an area of 300,000 square kilometres (120,000 sq mi) in what would later be the province of Manitoba — land that was granted by the Hudson's Bay Company, in what is referred to as the Selkirk Concession. This formed the earliest English and Scottish settlements in Assiniboia (part of present-day Manitoba), involving some 300 largely Scottish colonists.

One of the first efforts to encourage Welsh emigration to Canada began in 1812, when Welsh native John Mathews endeavoured to bring his family to Canada. Mathews left home at a young age and went on to become a successful businessman in the United States. When he returned to Wales, he found his family living in poverty and became convinced they should emigrate to Canada. In 1817 his family settled in the township of Southwald, near what is now London, Ontario. By 1812 he had brought over more relatives who built homes on the 100-acre (0.40 km^{2}) lots granted to them by Colonel Thomas Talbot.

==== Mid-century ====
A continual influx of immigrants from Scotland and Ulster meant that by 1843 there were over 30,000 Scots in New Brunswick.

Broader English, Scottish, and Irish settlement of British Columbia began in earnest with the founding of Fort Victoria in 1843 and the subsequent creation of the Colony of Vancouver Island in 1849. The capital, Victoria, developed during the height of the British Empire and long self-identified as being "more English than the English".

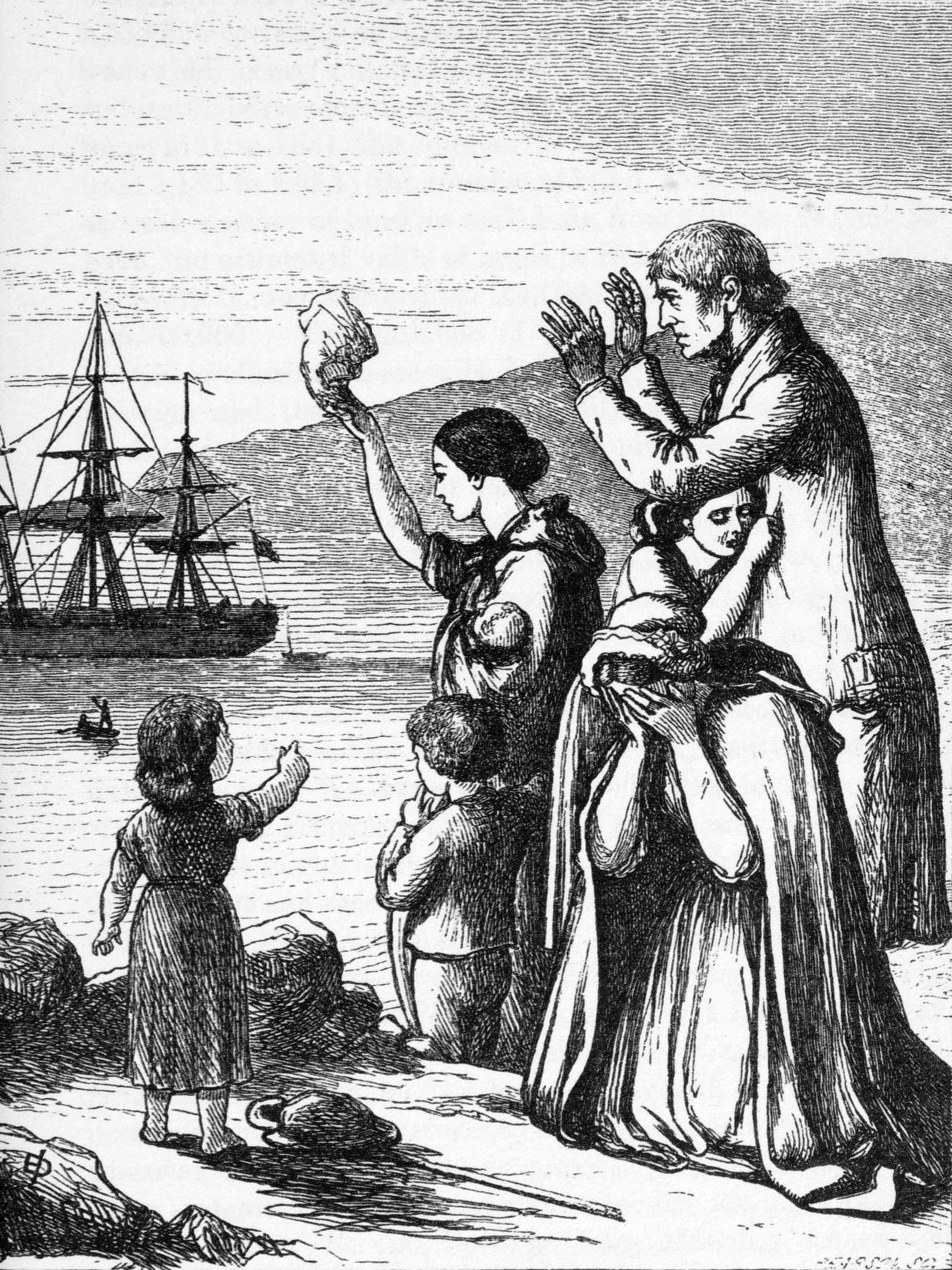
Emigrants Leave Ireland depicting the emigration to North America following the Great Famine in Ireland

After the permanent settlement in Newfoundland by Irish in the late 18th and early 19th century, overwhelmingly from Waterford, increased immigration of the Irish elsewhere in Canada began in the decades following the War of 1812 and formed a significant part of the Great Migration of Canada. Between 1825 and 1845, 60% of all immigrants to Canada were Irish; in 1831 alone, some 34,000 arrived in Montreal. Between 1830 and 1850, 624,000 Irish arrived; in contextual terms, at the end of this period, the population of the provinces of Canada was 2.4 million. Besides Upper Canada (Ontario), Lower Canada (Quebec), the Maritime colonies of Nova Scotia, Prince Edward Island and New Brunswick, especially Saint John, were arrival points. Not all remained; many out-migrated to the United States or to Western Canada in the decades that followed. Few returned to Ireland.

During the Great Famine of Ireland (1845–52), Canada received the most destitute Irish Catholics, who left Ireland in grave circumstances. Land estate owners in Ireland would either evict landholder tenants to board on returning empty lumber ships, or in some cases pay their fares. Others left on ships from the overcrowded docks in Liverpool and Cork. Most of the Irish immigrants who came to Canada and the United States in the nineteenth century and before were Irish speakers, with many knowing no other language on arrival.

The first South Slavs (including Serbs) to arrive in Canada came to British Columbia in the 1850s. Many of them came from the state of California in the United States, while others directly emigrated from the Balkans. They primarily originated from the Bay of Kotor and the Dalmatian coast which had similar climates as their destinations. The majority of these migrants came from territories controlled by Austria-Hungary for political and economic reasons, and only a small number came directly from Independent Serbia. Those who settled were typically young single men and employed in mining or forestry near such towns as Phoenix, Golden Prince Rupert and Kamloops.

The German Protestants developed the Lutheran Church along Canadian lines. In Waterloo County, Ontario, with large German elements that arrived after 1850, the Lutheran churches played major roles in the religious, cultural and social life of the community. By 1871, nearly 55% of the population of Waterloo County had German origins. Especially in Berlin, German was the dominant language spoken. Research indicates that there was no apparent conflict between the Germans from Europe and those who came from Pennsylvania.

==== Late 19th century ====
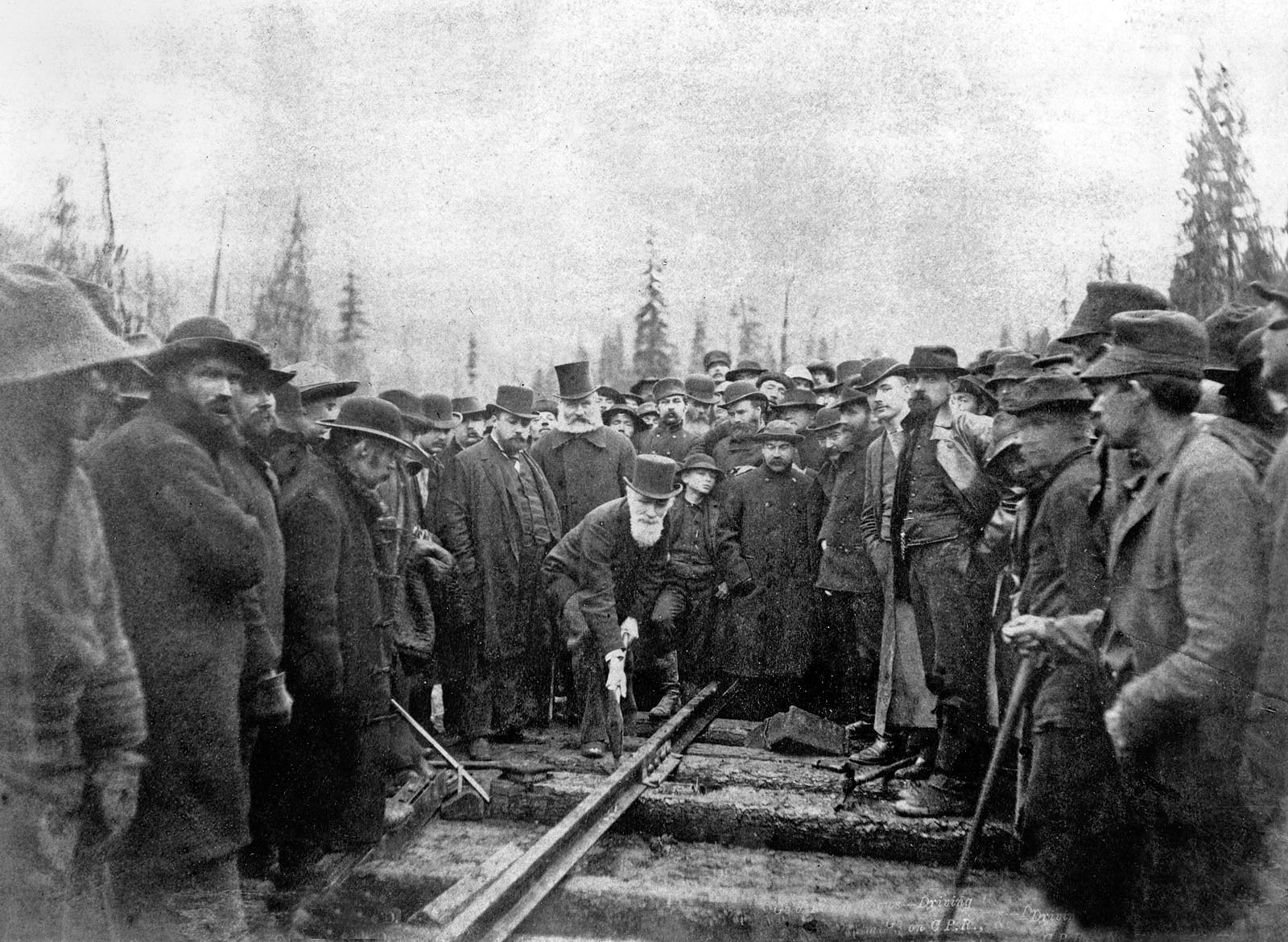
Scottish-Canadian Lord Strathcona drives the last spike of the Canadian Pacific Railway at Craigellachie, November 7, 1885.

The French-English tensions that marked the establishment of the earliest English-speaking settlements in Nova Scotia were echoed on the Prairies in the late nineteenth century. The suppression of the rebellions allowed the government of Canada to proceed with a settlement of Manitoba, Saskatchewan, and Alberta that was to create provinces that identified generally with English Canada in culture and outlook, although immigration included large numbers of people from non-English-speaking European backgrounds, especially Scandinavians and Ukrainians.

The history of Yugoslav-Bosnian arrivals to Canada dates back to as far as the 19th century. Around the same time, many thousands of Yugoslav-Aegean Macedonians emigrated to Canada in the 1890s. They settled primarily in Ontario, especially Toronto. Many early Aegean Macedonian immigrants found industrial work in Toronto. Later migrants found work as factory in abattoirs and foundries. Chatham and Windsor attracted many Macedonian immigrants who worked along the railroads. Many later settled in Detroit, Michigan.

Western Canada started to attract in 1896 and draw large numbers of other German immigrants, mostly from Eastern Europe. Plautdietsch-speaking Russian Mennonites of Dutch-Prussian ancestry were especially prominent since they were persecuted by the Tsarist regime in Russia. The farmers were used to the harsh conditions of farming in southern Imperial Russia (now Ukraine) and so were some of the most successful in adapting to the Canadian Prairies.

=== 20th century ===
==== Early century ====
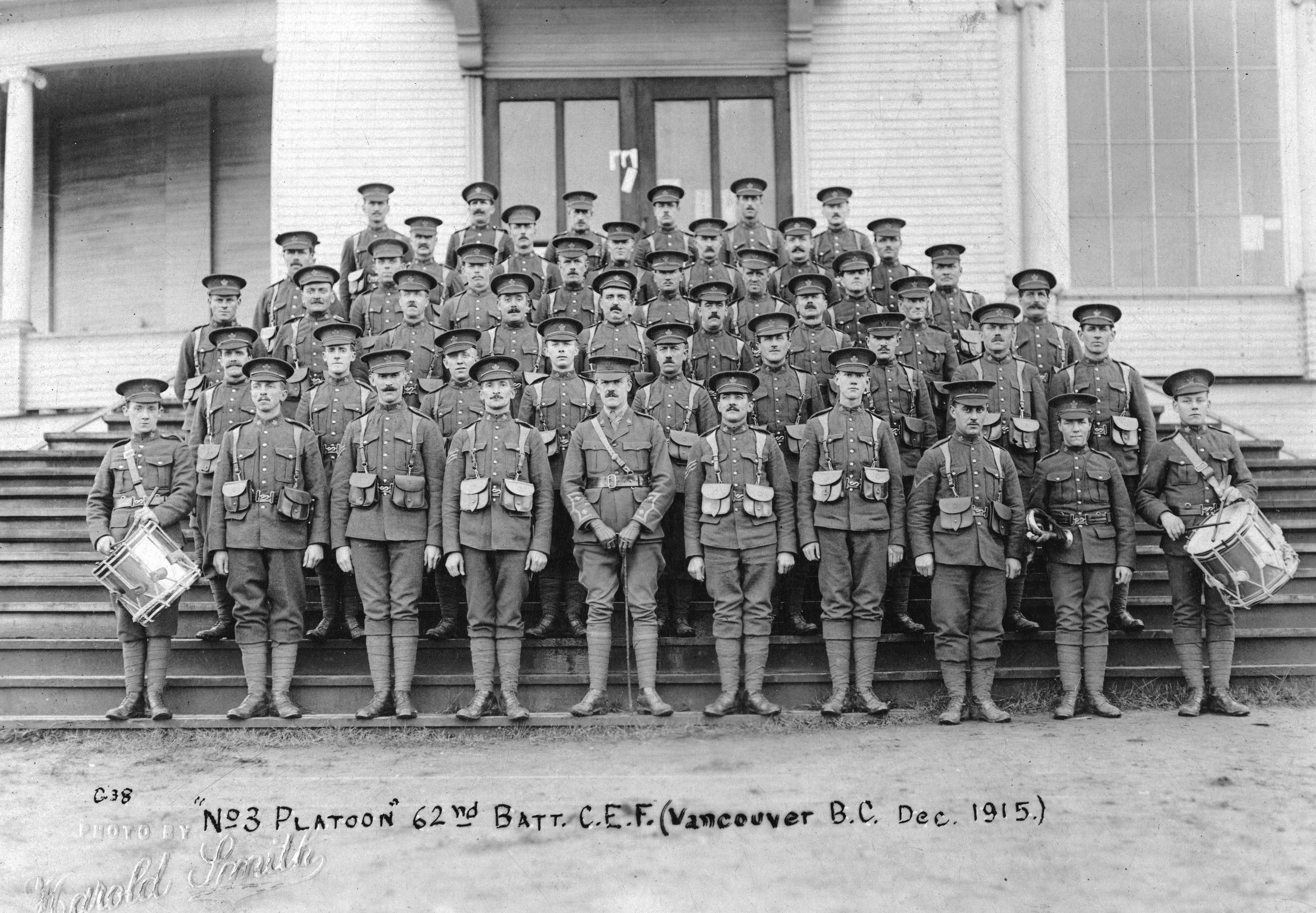
Soldiers of predominantly British descent from Vancouver in the Canadian Expeditionary Force, 1915

Nearly one million European immigrants, primarily from non-British and non-French origins, came through Pier 21 in Halifax, Nova Scotia in the early-mid 1900s.

In 1902, Welsh immigrants arrived from Patagonia, which had been incorporated into Argentina in 1881. Compulsory military service and a series of floods that ruined Welsh farmers' crops led to some emigrants resettling at Llewelyn near Bangor, Saskatchewan, where they once again took up farming. A community of Welsh farmers was also established at Wood River near Ponoka, Alberta.

In the early 20th century, Yugoslavs (Serbs) arrived in the prairies. In Saskatchewan, they took up farming. In Alberta, coal mining and road construction was a source of employment. Many Serbs worked on the construction of railway lines that now extend from Edmonton to the Pacific coast. Communities of Serbs emerged in Regina, Lethbridge, Edmonton and Calgary while significant populations formed in Atlin, British Columbia and Dawson, Yukon. In Ontario and Quebec, Serbs were drawn to work in the industry sector. By 1914, the Serbian community of the city of Hamilton, Ontario numbered around 1,000. Further Serb settlement was established in Niagara Falls, London, and Windsor. The first Serbian immigrants to the city of Toronto arrived in 1903; by 1914 there were more than 200 Serbs.

Until the Second World War, most people who today identify themselves as Yugoslav-Macedonian Canadians claimed a Bulgarian ethnic identity and were recorded as part of the Bulgarian ethnic group. The term Macedonian was used as a geographic/regional term rather than an ethnic one. At that time the political organization by the Slavic immigrants from the region of Macedonia, the Macedonian Patriotic Organization, also promoted the idea of Macedonian Slavs being Bulgarians.

During the Great War, military-aged Serb males who hailed from Serbia or Montenegro were considered allies but those who were born in Austro-Hungarian territories were deemed enemy aliens by Canadian law, even though their sympathies tended to lie with the allied cause. The latter were restricted in their freedom of movements, had to wear special identity cards and had to identify themselves regularly at the police station. Several hundred were interned in prison camps throughout the country under terrible conditions. Physicist Mihajlo Pupin, Serbia's consul in New York City during the war, and Antun Seferović, the honorary consul of Serbia in Montreal, advocated for the rights of the classified aliens and internees through diplomacy via the Srpska Narodna Odbrana u Kanadi (Serbian National League of Canada) which resulted in exemption, compensation and the release of many ethnic Serbs. Another advocate for the rights of Serbs of Austro-Hungarian origin was Serbian-born court interpreter Bud Protich, who enlisted in the Canadian Army and was wounded in action in 1917.

==== Mid- to late century ====
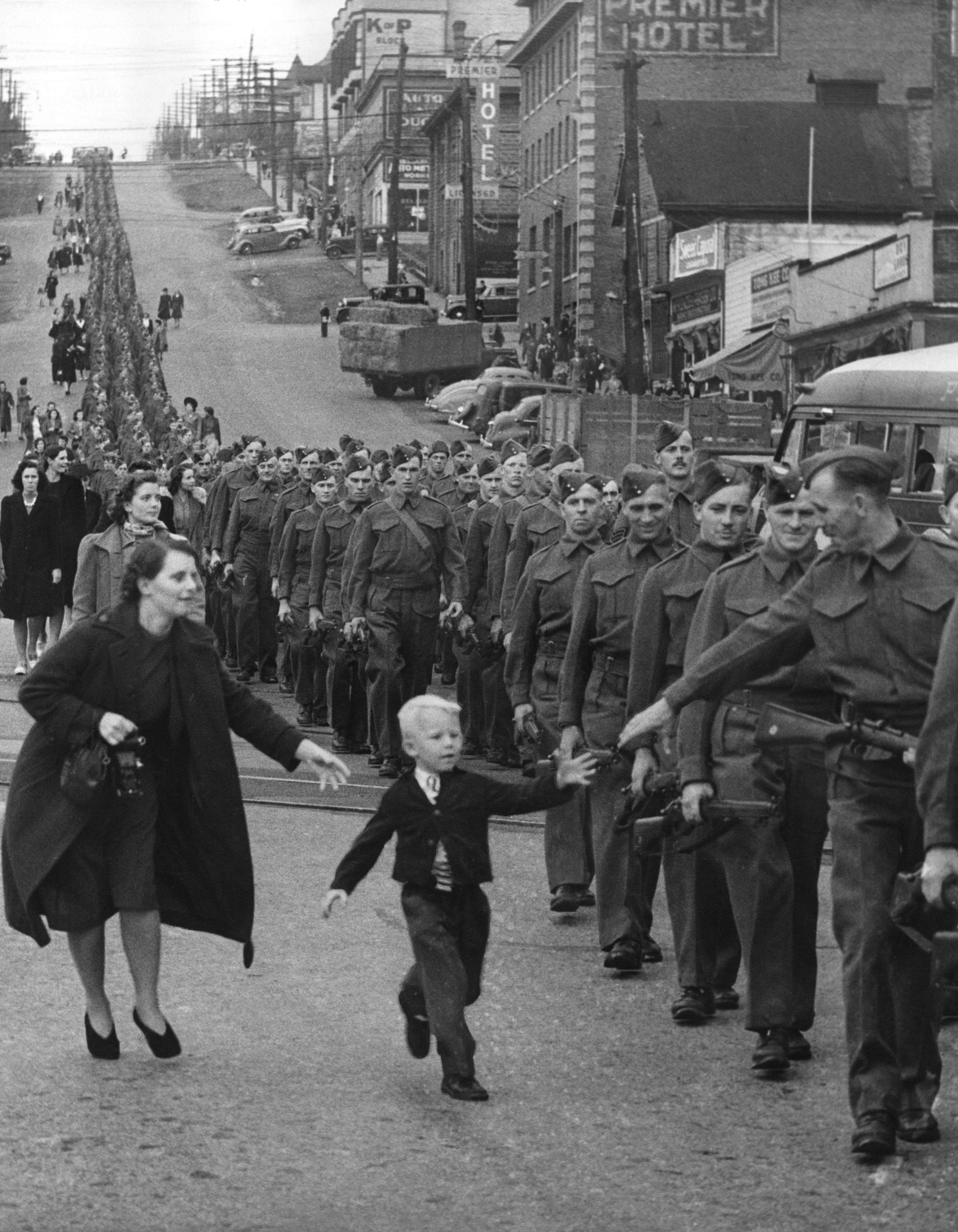
European Canadians in the British Columbia Regiment marching in New Westminster, October 1940

German immigration and settlement to Canada accelerated in the 1920s, when the United States imposed quotas on Central and Eastern European immigration. Soon, Canada imposed its own limits, however, and prevented most of those trying to flee the Third Reich from moving to Canada. Many of the Mennonites settled in the areas of Winnipeg and Steinbach, and the area just north of Saskatoon.

Victoria Hayward described the cultural changes of the Canadian Prairies as a "mosaic" in the 1920s, as hundreds of thousands of immigrants from Central and Eastern Europe settled across the Prairies beginning in earnest during the late 19th century, with large scale immigration flows lasting through the mid-20th century.

"New Canadians, representing many places and widely separated sections of Old Europe, have contributed to the Prairie Provinces a variety in the way of Church Architecture. Cupolas and domes distinctly Eastern, almost Turkish, startle one above the tops of Manitoba maples or the bush of the river banks. These architectural figures of the landscape, apart altogether of their religious significance, are centers where, crossing the threshold on Sundays, one has the opportunity of hearing Swedish music, or the rich, deep chanting of the Russian responses; and of viewing at close hand the artistry that goes to make up the interior appointments of these churches transplanted from the East to the West…It is indeed a mosaic of vast dimensions and great breadth, essayed of the Prairie."

After 1921, all immigrants from Yugoslavia, including Serbs, were designated as "Yugoslavs". The interwar period saw a major increase in Serbian immigration to Canada. More than 30,000 Yugoslavs came to Canada between 1919 and 1939, including an estimated 10,000 Serbs. Many of these immigrants were single, working men who settled in the northern region of the province of Ontario.

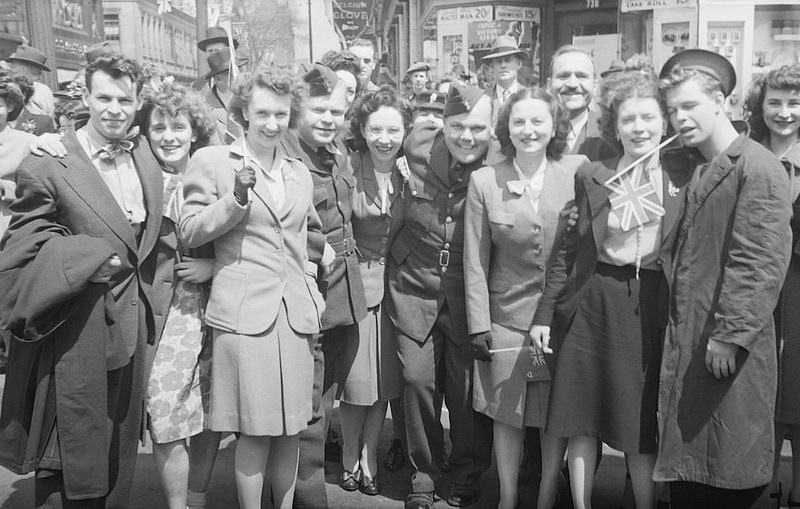
European Canadians in Montreal celebrating the Victory in Europe, May 1945

Another early use of the term mosaic to refer to Canadian society was by John Murray Gibbon, in his 1938 book Canadian Mosaic. Gibbon clearly disapproved of the American melting-pot concept. He saw the melting pot as a process by which immigrants and their descendants were encouraged to cut off ties with their countries and cultures of origin so as to assimilate into the American way of life.

In the aftermath of the Holocaust, displaced Jews emigrated to Canada from Europe, rejuvenating Canada's Yiddish-language European culture.

After the Second World War, Serbian political émigrés who were opposed to the newly established Yugoslav communist government sought refuge in Canada. Many of these were POWs and laborers from Austria and Germany who refused to return to their homeland. They settled in cities such as Toronto, Sudbury and Hamilton. Later, between 1957 and 1971, some 23,000 Yugoslavs arrived in Canada, of whom 10–15% were Serbs. They established organizations, newspapers and cultural events.

A community of Portuguese immigrants, primarily from the Azores Islands, came to settle in Canada beginning in significant numbers in 1953.

After India gained its independence from the British Empire, many Anglo-Indians emigrated to other Commonwealth countries. Canada became a destination for Anglo-Indian immigrants in the 1960s and 1970s, some of them re-emigrating to Canada from the United Kingdom because of their experiences with British racism, and they have established a Canadian Anglo-Indian community primarily centred in Toronto.

== Demography ==
=== Population ===
The first Canadian census in 1871, the European Canadian descended population reached a peak of 98.5 percent of the Canadian population. Since then, their proportion of Canada's population has been decreasing particularly since the mid-20th century to the most recent 2021 census. The actual decrease in the percentage of the population who are of European origins is hard to quantify, because individuals who fill out the census can self-identify under more than one category, based on their personal family history. Statistics Canada advises that the total number of people listed by ethnic origin is actually larger than the total population estimate. It is therefore not possible to express the number of individuals of European origin as a percentage of the total population.

The 2021 census recorded Canadians of European descent in the following categories: British Isles origins; French origins; other Western European origins; other Northern European origins; Southern European origins; Southeast European origins; Eastern European origins; and other European origins.

"Canadian" was the single largest ethnic origin reported in the 2021 census, reported by 5,677,205 individuals, although the grouping from the British Isles was collectively larger, at 10,712,280. The British category included 5,322,830 English, 4,392,200 Scottish, 4,413,115 Irish, and 455,720 Welsh. It was followed by French at 4,011,665. Other large groups included individuals of German (2,955,695), Italian (1,546,390), Ukrainian (1,258,635), Dutch (988,585), and Polish (982,820) origin.

Demographic vertical bar chart of between 1871 and 2021
Population (1871–2021) Canadian census
Demographic vertical bar chart of between 1871 and 2021
Population percentage (%) per census (1871–2021)

European Canadian population history (1871–2021) (Note: 1996–present census populations are potentially inaccurate, due to the creation of the "Canadian" ethnic origin category. (Note: All citizens of Canada are classified as "Canadians" as defined by Canada's nationality laws. However, "Canadian" as an ethnic group has since 1996 been added to census questionnaires for possible ancestry. "Canadian" was included as an example on the English questionnaire and "Canadien" as an example on the French questionnaire. The majority of respondents to this selection are from the eastern part of the country that was first settled, and are Anglophones and Francophones who no longer self-identify with their ethnic ancestral origins. This response is attributed to either multiple ethnic origins or the multi-generational distance from their ancestral lineage.))
Year	Population	% of total population
1871	3,433,315	98.495%
1881	4,146,900	95.886%
1901	5,170,522	96.262%
1911	7,005,583	97.21%
1921	8,568,584	97.504%
1931	10,134,313	97.663%
1941	11,242,868	97.708%
1951	13,582,574	96.953%
1961	17,653,864	96.796%
1971	20,763,915	96.27%
1981 (Note: All European responses (including multiple origins).)	22,024,190	91.45%
1996 (Note: All European-origin responses, including: "British Isles origins" (10,647,625), "French origins" (5,628,815), and "European origins" (8,472,015).)	24,748,455	86.751%
2001 (Note: All European-origin responses, including: "British Isles origins" (9,971,615), "French origins" (4,710,580), and "European origins" (8,731,955).)	23,414,150	78.998%
2011	20,157,965	61.359%
2016	19,683,320	57.119%
2021	19,062,115	52.472%

=== Ethnic and national origins ===
European Canadian population by country of origin (1871–1911)
Ethnicity	Population (1871)	% of Canadian population (1871)	Population (1881)	% of Canadian population (1881)	Population (1901)	% of Canadian population (1901)	Population (1911)	% of Canadian population (1911)
Albanian	N/A	N/A	N/A	N/A	N/A	N/A	N/A	N/A
Austrian	N/A	N/A	N/A	N/A	10,947	0.2%	42,535	0.6%
Basque	N/A	N/A	N/A	N/A	N/A	N/A	N/A	N/A
Belgian	N/A	N/A	N/A	N/A	2,994	0.1%	9,593	0.1%
Bosnian	N/A	N/A	N/A	N/A	N/A	N/A	N/A	N/A
British Isles (not otherwise specified)	N/A	N/A	N/A	N/A	N/A	N/A	N/A	N/A
Bulgarian	N/A	N/A	N/A	N/A	N/A	N/A	N/A	N/A
Croatian	N/A	N/A	N/A	N/A	N/A	N/A	N/A	N/A
Cypriot	N/A	N/A	N/A	N/A	N/A	N/A	N/A	N/A
Czechoslovak	N/A	N/A	N/A	N/A	N/A	N/A	N/A	N/A
Czech	N/A	N/A	N/A	N/A	N/A	N/A	N/A	N/A
Danish	N/A	N/A	N/A	N/A	N/A	N/A	N/A	N/A
Dutch	29,662	0.9%	30,412	0.7%	33,845	0.6%	54,986	0.8%
English	706,369	20.3%	881,301	20.4%	1,260,899	23.5%	1,823,150	25.3%
Estonian	N/A	N/A	N/A	N/A	N/A	N/A	N/A	N/A
Finnish	N/A	N/A	N/A	N/A	2,502	0.1%	15,497	0.2%
French	1,082,940	31.1%	1,298,929	30.0%	1,649,371	30.7%	2,054,890	28.5%
German	202,991	5.8%	254,319	5.9%	310,501	5.8%	393,320	5.5%
Greek	N/A	N/A	N/A	N/A	291	0.0%	3,594	0.0%
Hungarian	N/A	N/A	N/A	N/A	1,549	0.0%	11,605	0.2%
Icelandic	N/A	N/A	N/A	N/A	N/A	N/A	N/A	N/A
Irish	846,414	24.3%	957,403	22.1%	988,721	18.4%	1,050,384	14.6%
Italian	1,035	0.0%	1,849	0.0%	10,834	0.2%	45,411	0.6%
Kosovar	N/A	N/A	N/A	N/A	N/A	N/A	N/A	N/A
Latvian	N/A	N/A	N/A	N/A	N/A	N/A	N/A	N/A
Lithuanian	N/A	N/A	N/A	N/A	N/A	N/A	N/A	N/A
Luxembourger	N/A	N/A	N/A	N/A	N/A	N/A	N/A	N/A
Macedonian	N/A	N/A	N/A	N/A	N/A	N/A	N/A	N/A
Maltese	N/A	N/A	N/A	N/A	N/A	N/A	N/A	N/A
Moldovan	N/A	N/A	N/A	N/A	N/A	N/A	N/A	N/A
Montenegrin	N/A	N/A	N/A	N/A	N/A	N/A	N/A	N/A
Norwegian	N/A	N/A	N/A	N/A	N/A	N/A	N/A	N/A
Polish	N/A	N/A	N/A	N/A	6,285	0.1%	33,365	0.5%
Portuguese	N/A	N/A	N/A	N/A	N/A	N/A	N/A	N/A
Romanian	N/A	N/A	N/A	N/A	N/A	N/A	N/A	N/A
Russian	607	0.0%	1,227	0.1%	19,825	0.4%	43,142	0.6%
Scottish	549,946	15.8%	699,863	16.2%	800,154	14.9%	997,880	13.9%
Serbian	N/A	N/A	N/A	N/A	N/A	N/A	N/A	N/A
Slovak	N/A	N/A	N/A	N/A	N/A	N/A	N/A	N/A
Slovene	N/A	N/A	N/A	N/A	N/A	N/A	N/A	N/A
Spanish	N/A	N/A	N/A	N/A	N/A	N/A	N/A	N/A
Swedish	N/A	N/A	N/A	N/A	N/A	N/A	N/A	N/A
Swiss	2,962	0.1%	4,588	0.1%	3,865	0.1%	6,625	0.1%
Ukrainian	N/A	N/A	N/A	N/A	N/A	N/A	N/A	N/A
Welsh	N/A	N/A	N/A	N/A	N/A	N/A	N/A	N/A
Yugoslav	N/A	N/A	N/A	N/A	N/A	N/A	N/A	N/A

European Canadian population by country of origin (1921–1961)
Ethnicity	Population (1921)	% of Canadian population (1921)	Population (1941)	% of Canadian population (1941)	Population (1951)	% of Canadian population (1951)	Population (1961)	% of Canadian population (1961)
Albanian	N/A	N/A	N/A	N/A	N/A	N/A	N/A	N/A
Basque	N/A	N/A	N/A	N/A	N/A	N/A	N/A	N/A
Belgian	20,234	0.2%	29,711	0.3%	35,148	0.3%	61,382	0.3%
Bosnian	N/A	N/A	N/A	N/A	N/A	N/A	N/A	N/A
British Isles (not otherwise specified)	N/A	N/A	N/A	N/A	N/A	N/A	N/A	N/A
Bulgarian	N/A	N/A	N/A	N/A	N/A	N/A	N/A	N/A
Byelorussian	N/A	N/A	N/A	N/A	N/A	N/A	N/A	N/A
Croatian	N/A	N/A	N/A	N/A	N/A	N/A	N/A	N/A
Cypriot	N/A	N/A	N/A	N/A	N/A	N/A	N/A	N/A
Czechoslovak	N/A	N/A	42,912	0.4%	63,959	0.4%	73,061	0.4%
Czech	N/A	N/A	N/A	N/A	N/A	N/A	N/A	N/A
Danish	N/A	N/A	37,439	0.3%	42,671	0.3%	85,473	0.5%
Dutch	117,506	1.2%	212,863	1.8%	264,267	1.9%	429,679	2.4%
English	2,545,496	29.0%	2,968,402	25.1%	3,630,344	25.9%	4,195,175	23.0%
Estonian	N/A	N/A	N/A	N/A	N/A	N/A	N/A	N/A
Finnish	21,494	0.2%	41,683	0.4%	43,745	0.3%	59,436	0.3%
French	2,452,751	27.9%	3,483,038	29.5%	4,319,167	30.8%	5,540,346	30.4%
German	294,636	3.4%	464,682	3.9%	619,995	4.4%	1,049,599	5.8%
Greek	5,740	0.1%	11,692	0.1%	13,966	0.1%	56,475	0.3%
Hungarian	13,181	0.1%	54,598	0.5%	60,460	0.4%	126,220	0.7%
Icelandic	N/A	N/A	21,050	0.2%	23,307	0.2%	30,623	0.2%
Irish	1,107,817	12.6%	1,267,702	10.7%	1,439,635	10.3%	1,753,351	9.6%
Italian	66,769	0.8%	112,625	1.0%	152,245	1.1%	459,351	2.5%
Kosovar	N/A	N/A	N/A	N/A	N/A	N/A	N/A	N/A
Latvian	N/A	N/A	N/A	N/A	N/A	N/A	N/A	N/A
Lithuanian	N/A	N/A	7,789	0.1%	16,224	0.1%	27,629	0.2%
Luxembourger	N/A	N/A	N/A	N/A	N/A	N/A	N/A	N/A
Macedonian	N/A	N/A	N/A	N/A	N/A	N/A	N/A	N/A
Maltese	N/A	N/A	N/A	N/A	N/A	N/A	N/A	N/A
Moldovan	N/A	N/A	N/A	N/A	N/A	N/A	N/A	N/A
Montenegrin	N/A	N/A	N/A	N/A	N/A	N/A	N/A	N/A
Norwegian	N/A	N/A	100,718	0.9%	119,266	0.9%	148,681	0.8%
Polish	53,403	0.6%	167,485	1.4%	219,845	1.6%	323,517	1.8%
Portuguese	N/A	N/A	N/A	N/A	N/A	N/A	N/A	N/A
Romanian	N/A	N/A	24,689	0.2%	23,601	0.2%	43,805	0.2%
Russian	100,064	1.1%	83,708	0.7%	91,279	0.6%	119,168	0.7%
Scottish	1,173,637	13.4%	1,403,974	11.9%	1,547,470	11.0%	1,902,302	10.4%
Serbian	N/A	N/A	N/A	N/A	N/A	N/A	N/A	N/A
Slovak	N/A	N/A	N/A	N/A	N/A	N/A	N/A	N/A
Slovene	N/A	N/A	N/A	N/A	N/A	N/A	N/A	N/A
Spanish	N/A	N/A	N/A	N/A	N/A	N/A	N/A	N/A
Swedish	N/A	N/A	85,396	0.7%	97,780	0.7%	121,757	0.7%
Swiss	12,837	0.2%	N/A	N/A	N/A	N/A	N/A	N/A
Ukrainian	N/A	N/A	305,929	2.6%	395,043	2.8%	473,337	2.6%
Welsh	N/A	N/A	N/A	N/A	N/A	N/A	N/A	N/A
Yugoslav	N/A	N/A	N/A	N/A	N/A	N/A	21,214	0.2%

European Canadian population by country of origin (1991–2006)
Ethnicity	Population (1991)	% of Canadian population (1991)	Population (1996)	% of Canadian population (1996)	Population (2001)	% of Canadian population (2001)	Population (2006)	% of Canadian population (2006)
Albanian	N/A	N/A	N/A	N/A	14,935	0.1%	22,395	0.1%
Austrian	107,671	1.2%	37,715	0.3%	32,231	0.2%	106,535	0.6%
Austrian	N/A	N/A	N/A	N/A	147,585	0.5%	194,255	0.6%
Basque	N/A	N/A	N/A	N/A	2,715	0.0%	4,975	0.0%
Belgian	N/A	N/A	N/A	N/A	129,780	0.4%	168,910	0.5%
Bosnian	N/A	N/A	N/A	N/A	15,720	0.1%	21,045	0.1%
British Isles (not otherwise specified)	N/A	N/A	N/A	N/A	150,585	0.5%	403,915	1.3%
Bulgarian	N/A	N/A	N/A	N/A	15,195	0.1%	27,255	0.1%
Byelorussian	N/A	N/A	N/A	N/A	5,115	0.0%	10,505	0.0%
Croatian	N/A	N/A	N/A	N/A	97,050	0.3%	110,880	0.4%
Cypriot	N/A	N/A	N/A	N/A	2,060	0.0%	3,395	0.0%
Czechoslovak	N/A	N/A	N/A	N/A	33,540	0.1%	36,970	0.1%
Czech	N/A	N/A	N/A	N/A	79,910	0.3%	98,090	0.3%
Danish	N/A	N/A	N/A	N/A	170,780	0.6%	200,035	0.6%
Dutch	961,600	3.4%	916,215	3.1%	923,310	3.1%	1,035,965	3.3%
English	8,605,125	30.7%	6,832,095	23.1%	5,978,875	20.2%	6,570,015	21.0%
Estonian	N/A	N/A	N/A	N/A	22,085	0.1%	23,930	0.1%
Finnish	N/A	N/A	N/A	N/A	114,690	0.4%	131,040	0.4%
French	8,369,210	29.9%	5,597,845	18.9%	4,668,410	15.8%	4,941,210	15.8%
German	2,793,775	10.0%	2,757,140	9.3%	2,742,765	9.3%	3,179,425	10.2%
Greek	191,475	0.7%	203,345	0.7%	215,105	0.7%	242,685	0.8%
Hungarian	N/A	N/A	N/A	N/A	267,255	0.9%	315,510	1.0%
Icelandic	N/A	N/A	N/A	N/A	75,090	0.3%	88,875	0.3%
Irish	N/A	N/A	N/A	N/A	3,822,660	12.9%	4,354,155	13.9%
Italian	1,147,780	4.1%	1,207,475	4.2%	1,270,370	4.3%	1,445,335	4.6%
Kosovar	N/A	N/A	N/A	N/A	1,200	0.0%	1,530	0.0%
Latvian	N/A	N/A	N/A	N/A	22,615	0.1%	27,870	0.1%
Lithuanian	N/A	N/A	N/A	N/A	36,485	0.1%	46,690	0.1%
Luxembourger	N/A	N/A	N/A	N/A	2,390	0.0%	3,225	0.0%
Macedonian	N/A	N/A	N/A	N/A	31,265	0.1%	37,055	0.1%
Maltese	N/A	N/A	N/A	N/A	33,000	0.1%	37,120	0.1%
Moldovan	N/A	N/A	N/A	N/A	N/A	N/A	N/A	N/A
Montenegrin	N/A	N/A	N/A	N/A	1,055	0.0%	2,370	0.0%
Norwegian	286,240	1.0%	N/A	N/A	363,760	1.2%	432,515	1.4%
Polish	740,720	2.6%	786,735	2.7%	817,085	2.8%	984,565	3.2%
Portuguese	292,185	1.0%	335,110	1.1%	357,690	1.2%	410,850	1.3%
Romanian	N/A	N/A	N/A	N/A	131,830	0.4%	192,170	0.6%
Russian	N/A	N/A	N/A	N/A	337,960	1.1%	500,600	1.6%
Scottish	4,248,365	15.2%	4,260,840	14.4%	4,157,210	14.0%	4,719,850	15.1%
Serbian	N/A	N/A	N/A	N/A	55,540	0.2%	72,690	0.2%
Slovak	N/A	N/A	N/A	N/A	50,860	0.2%	64,145	0.2%
Slovene	N/A	N/A	N/A	N/A	28,910	0.1%	35,935	0.1%
Spanish	158,915	0.6%	204,360	0.7%	213,105	0.7%	325,730	1.0%
Swedish	N/A	N/A	N/A	N/A	282,760	1.0%	334,765	1.1%
Swiss	N/A	N/A	N/A	N/A	110,795	0.4%	137,775	0.4%
Ukrainian	1,054,295	3.8%	1,026,470	3.5%	1,071,060	3.6%	1,209,085	3.9%
Welsh	N/A	N/A	N/A	N/A	350,365	1.2%	440,965	1.4%
Yugoslav	21,404	0.2%	68,587	0.4%	65,505	0.2%	65,305	0.2%

European Canadian population by country of origin (2011–2021)
Ethnicity	Population (2011)	% of Canadian population (2011)	Population (2016)	% of Canadian population (2021)	Population (2021)	% of Canadian population (2021)
Albanian	28,270	0.1%	36,185	0.1%	41,625	0.1%
Austrian	197,990	0.6%	207,050	0.6%	189,535	0.5%
Basque	5,570	0.0%	6,965	0.0%	7,740	0.0%
Belgian	176,615	0.5%	186,665	0.5%	182,175	0.5%
Bosniak	N/A	N/A	N/A	N/A	2,770	0.0%
Bosnian	22,920	0.1%	26,740	0.1%	28,490	0.1%
British Isles (not otherwise specified)	576,030	1.8%	644,695	1.9%	938,950	2.6%
Bulgarian	30,485	0.1%	34,565	0.1%	33,080	0.1%
Byelorussian	15,565	0.0%	20,710	0.0%	18,850	0.0%
Croatian	114,880	0.3%	133,970	0.4%	130,820	0.4%
Cypriot	4,815	0.0%	5,650	0.0%	4,830	0.0%
Czechoslovak	40,035	0.1%	40,715	0.1%	33,135	0.1%
Czech	94,805	0.3%	104,580	0.3%	98,925	0.3%
Danish	203,080	0.6%	207,470	0.6%	196,945	0.5%
Dutch	1,067,245	3.2%	1,111,655	3.2%	988,585	2.7%
English	6,509,500	19.8%	6,320,085	18.3%	5,322,830	14.7%
Estonian	23,180	0.1%	24,530	0.1%	23,455	0.1%
Finnish	136,215	0.4%	143,645	0.4%	144,055	0.4%
French	5,065,690	15.4%	4,670,595	13.6%	4,011,670	11.0%
German	3,203,330	9.8%	3,322,405	9.6%	2,955,695	8.1%
Greek	252,960	0.8%	271,410	0.8%	262,135	0.7%
Greek Cypriot	N/A	N/A	N/A	N/A	1,935	0.0%
Hungarian	316,765	1.0%	348,085	1.0%	320,155	0.9%
Icelandic	94,205	0.3%	101,795	0.3%	101,990	0.3%
Irish	4,544,870	13.8%	4,627,000	13.4%	4,413,120	12.2%
Italian	1,488,425	4.5%	1,587,970	4.6%	1,546,390	4.3%
Kosovar	2,760	0.0%	2,865	0.0%	3,730	0.0%
Latvian	27,355	0.1%	30,725	0.1%	28,135	0.1%
Lithuanian	49,130	0.1%	59,285	0.2%	52,040	0.1%
Luxembourger	3,790	0.0%	3,915	0.0%	4,145	0.0%
Macedonian	36,985	0.1%	43,110	0.1%	39,440	0.1%
Maltese	38,780	0.1%	41,920	0.1%	40,665	0.1%
Moldovan	8,050	0.0%	14,915	0.0%	18,190	0.0%
Montenegrin	2,970	0.0%	4,160	0.0%	4,310	0.0%
Northern Irish	N/A	N/A	N/A	N/A	25,205	0.1%
Norwegian	452,705	1.4%	463,275	1.3%	466,500	1.3%
Pennsylvania Dutch	N/A	N/A	N/A	N/A	17,315	0.0%
Polish	1,010,705	3.1%	1,106,585	3.2%	982,815	2.7%
Portuguese	429,850	1.3%	482,605	1.4%	448,305	1.2%
Romanian	204,625	0.6%	238,050	0.7%	215,885	0.6%
Russian	550,520	1.7%	622,445	1.8%	548,145	1.5%
Scottish	4,714,970	14.4%	4,799,005	13.9%	4,392,200	12.1%
Serbian	80,320	0.2%	96,530	0.3%	93,355	0.3%
Slovak	66,545	0.2%	72,285	0.2%	68,210	0.2%
Slovene	37,170	0.1%	40,470	0.1%	38,595	0.1%
Spanish	368,305	1.1%	396,460	1.2%	342,045	0.9%
Swedish	341,845	1.0%	349,645	1.0%	334,510	0.9%
Swiss	146,830	0.4%	155,120	0.5%	145,570	0.4%
Ukrainian	1,251,170	3.8%	1,359,655	3.9%	1,258,635	3.5%
Welsh	458,705	1.4%	474,805	1.4%	455,720	1.3%
Yugoslav	48,320	0.1%	38,480	0.1%	30,565	0.1%

=== Language ===
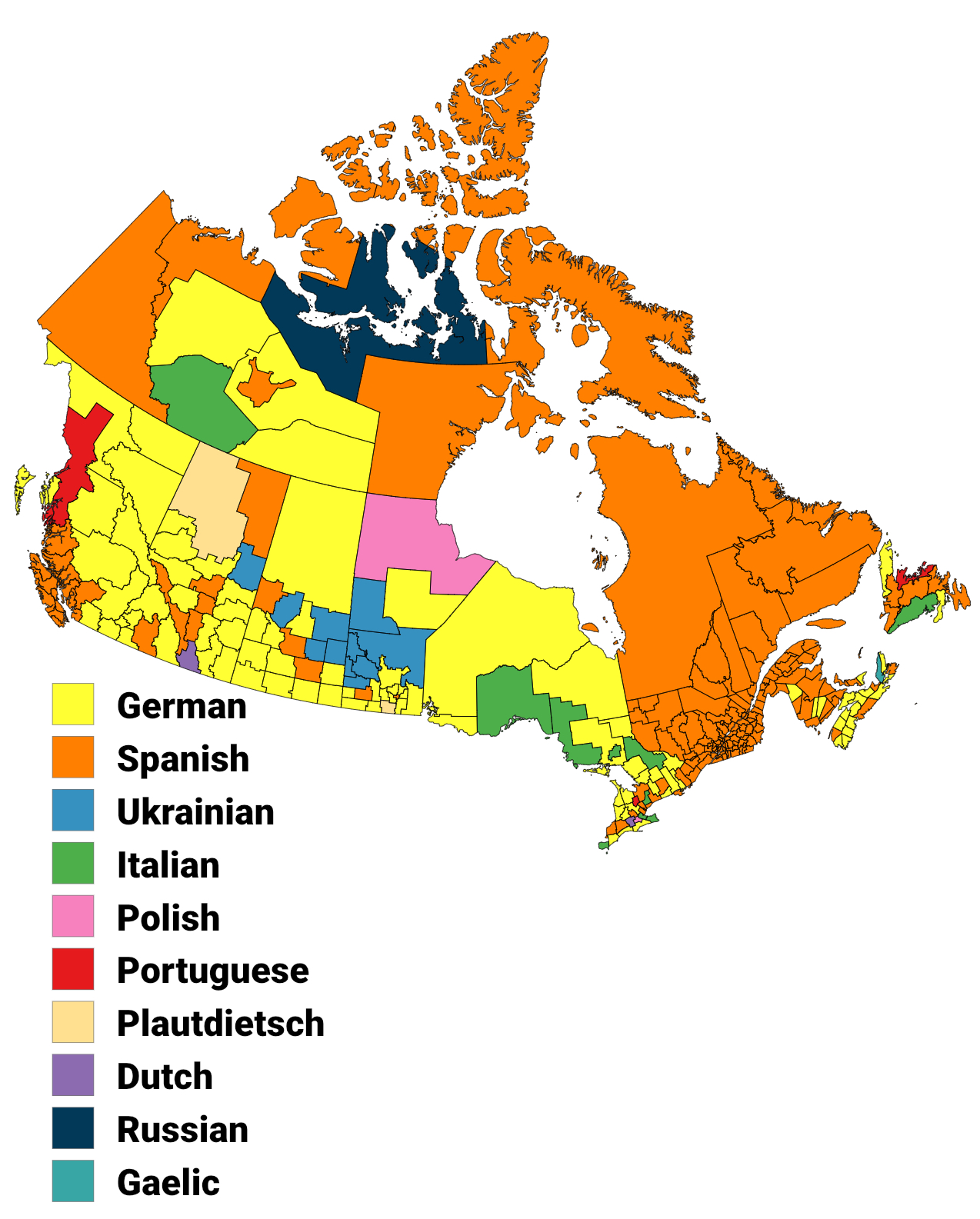
Largest European knowledge of language by census division, 2021 census

In the 2021 census, the largest non-official European mother tongue languages were Spanish (538,870), Italian (319,505), German (272,865) and Portuguese (240,680) and Russian (197,905). English and French are not included in this table because most Canadians have one of those languages as their mother tongue, regardless of their ethnic origin.

European mother tongue by language (1991–2001)
Language	Population (1991)	% of non-official language mother tongue speakers in Canada (1991)	% of all language mother tongue speakers in Canada (1991)	Population (1996)	% of non-official language mother tongue speakers in Canada (1996)	% of all language mother tongue speakers in Canada (1996)	Population (2001)	% of non-official language mother tongue speakers in Canada (2001)	% of all language mother tongue speakers in Canada (2001)
Afrikaans	N/A	N/A	N/A	N/A	N/A	N/A	N/A	N/A	N/A
Albanian	N/A	N/A	N/A	N/A	N/A	N/A	N/A	N/A	N/A
Armenian	N/A	N/A	N/A	26,295	0.6%	0.1%	27,350	0.5%	0.1%
Belarusan	N/A	N/A	N/A	420	0.0%	0.0%	530	0.0%	0.0%
Bosnian	N/A	N/A	N/A	N/A	N/A	N/A	N/A	N/A	N/A
Bulgarian	N/A	N/A	N/A	6,330	0.1%	0.0%	9,130	0.2%	0.0%
Catalan	N/A	N/A	N/A	N/A	N/A	N/A	N/A	N/A	N/A
Croatian	N/A	N/A	N/A	50,105	1.1%	0.2%	54,880	1.1%	0.2%
Czech	N/A	N/A	N/A	24,985	0.5%	0.1%	24,795	0.5%	0.1%
Danish	N/A	N/A	N/A	20,280	0.4%	0.1%	18,230	0.4%	0.1%
Dutch	124,535	3.5%	0.5%	133,805	2.9%	0.5%	128,670	2.5%	0.4%
Estonian	N/A	N/A	N/A	10,690	0.2%	0.0%	8,720	0.2%	0.0%
Finnish	N/A	N/A	N/A	24,735	0.5%	0.1%	22,400	0.4%	0.1%
Flemish	N/A	N/A	N/A	6,980	0.2%	0.0%	6,010	0.1%	0.0%
Frisian	N/A	N/A	N/A	2,915	0.0%	0.0%	3,185	0.1%	0.0%
German	424,645	12.0%	1.6%	450,140	9.8%	1.6%	438,080	8.4%	1.5%
Greek	114,370	3.2%	0.4%	121,180	2.6%	0.4%	120,365	2.3%	0.4%
Hungarian	72,900	2.1%	0.3%	77,235	1.7%	0.3%	75,550	1.5%	0.3%
Icelandic	N/A	N/A	N/A	2,675	0.1%	0.0%	2,075	0.0%	0.0%
Italian	449,660	12.7%	1.7%	484,500	10.5%	1.7%	469,485	9.0%	1.6%
Latvian	N/A	N/A	N/A	9,635	0.2%	0.0%	8,230	0.2%	0.0%
Lithuanian	N/A	N/A	N/A	9,385	0.2%	0.0%	8,770	0.2%	0.0%
Macedonian	N/A	N/A	N/A	19,300	0.4%	0.1%	16,905	0.3%	0.1%
Maltese	N/A	N/A	N/A	7,120	0.2%	0.0%	7,375	0.1%	0.0%
Norwegian	N/A	N/A	N/A	10,235	0.2%	0.0%	8,725	0.2%	0.0%
Polish	171,975	4.9%	0.6%	213,410	4.6%	0.7%	208,370	4.0%	0.7%
Portuguese	186,995	5.3%	0.7%	211,290	4.6%	0.7%	213,815	4.1%	0.7%
Romanian	N/A	N/A	N/A	35,710	0.8%	0.1%	50,900	1.0%	0.2%
Russian	N/A	N/A	N/A	57,495	1.3%	0.2%	94,555	1.8%	0.3%
Scottish Gaelic	N/A	N/A	N/A	2,175	0.0%	0.0%	2,155	0.0%	0.0%
Serbian	N/A	N/A	N/A	28,620	0.6%	0.1%	41,175	0.8%	0.1%
Serbo-Croatian	N/A	N/A	N/A	17,940	0.4%	0.1%	26,685	0.5%	0.1%
Slovak	N/A	N/A	N/A	18,285	0.4%	0.1%	17,540	0.3%	0.1%
Slovene	N/A	N/A	N/A	14,085	0.3%	0.0%	12,800	0.2%	0.0%
Spanish	158,655	4.5%	0.6%	212,890	4.6%	0.8%	245,495	4.7%	0.8%
Swedish	N/A	N/A	N/A	9,760	0.2%	0.0%	9,070	0.2%	0.0%
Ukrainian	166,830	4.7%	0.6%	162,695	3.5%	0.6%	148,085	2.8%	0.5%
Welsh	N/A	N/A	N/A	1,670	0.0%	0.0%	1,615	0.0%	0.0%
Yiddish	N/A	N/A	N/A	21,415	0.1%	0.5%	19,290	0.4%	0.1%

European mother tongue by language (2006–2016)
Language	Population (2006)	% of non-official language mother tongue speakers in Canada (2006)	% of all language mother tongue speakers in Canada (2006)	Population (2011)	% of non-official language mother tongue speakers in Canada (2011)	% of all language mother tongue speakers in Canada (2011)	Population (2016)	% of non-official language mother tongue speakers in Canada (2016)	% of all language mother tongue speakers in Canada (2016)
Afrikaans	N/A	N/A	N/A	8,770	0.1%	0.0%	10,265	0.1%	0.0%
Albanian	N/A	N/A	N/A	23,820	0.4%	0.1%	26,890	0.4%	0.1%
Armenian	30,130	0.5%	0.1%	29,795	0.5%	0.1%	33,355	0.5%	0.1%
Belarusan	N/A	N/A	N/A	N/A	N/A	N/A	810	0.0%	0.0%
Bosnian	12,790	0.2%	0.0%	11,685	0.2%	0.0%	12,210	0.2%	0.0%
Bulgarian	16,790	0.3%	0.1%	19,050	0.3%	0.1%	20,025	0.3%	0.1%
Catalan	N/A	N/A	N/A	N/A	N/A	N/A	865	0.0%	0.0%
Croatian	55,335	0.9%	0.2%	49,730	0.8%	0.2%	48,200	0.7%	0.1%
Czech	24,450	0.4%	0.1%	23,585	0.4%	0.1%	22,290	0.3%	0.1%
Danish	18,735	0.3%	0.1%	14,145	0.2%	0.0%	12,630	0.2%	0.0%
Dutch	128,905	2.1%	0.4%	110,490	1.7%	0.3%	99,020	1.4%	0.3%
Estonian	8,245	0.1%	0.0%	6,385	0.1%	0.0%	5,445	0.1%	0.0%
Finnish	21,030	0.3%	0.1%	17,415	0.3%	0.1%	15,295	0.3%	0.1%
Flemish	5,665	0.1%	0.0%	4,690	0.1%	0.0%	3,895	0.1%	0.0%
Frisian	2,890	0.0%	0.0%	14,935	0.1%	N/A	2,100	0.0%	0.0%
German	450,570	7.3%	1.4%	409,200	6.2%	1.2%	384,035	5.2%	1.1%
Greek	108,925	1.7%	0.3%	106,525	1.5%	0.3%	117,285	1.9%	0.4%
Hungarian	73,335	1.2%	0.2%	67,920	1.0%	0.2%	61,235	0.8%	0.2%
Icelandic	N/A	N/A	N/A	N/A	N/A	N/A	1,285	0.0%	0.0%
Italian	455,040	7.4%	1.5%	407,485	6.2%	1.2%	375,635	5.1%	1.1%
Latvian	6,995	0.1%	0.0%	6,200	0.1%	0.0%	5,455	0.1%	0.0%
Lithuanian	8,335	0.1%	0.0%	7,245	0.1%	0.0%	7,075	0.1%	0.0%
Macedonian	18,440	0.3%	0.0%	17,245	0.3%	0.1%	16,775	0.2%	0.0%
Maltese	6,405	0.1%	0.0%	6,220	0.1%	0.0%	5,565	0.1%	0.0%
Norwegian	7,225	0.1%	0.0%	5,800	0.1%	0.0%	4,615	0.1%	0.0%
Polish	211,175	3.4%	0.7%	191,645	2.9%	0.6%	181,710	2.5%	0.5%
Portuguese	219,270	3.6%	0.7%	211,335	3.2%	0.6%	221,540	3.0%	0.6%
Romanian	78,500	1.3%	0.3%	90,300	1.4%	0.3%	96,665	1.3%	0.3%
Russian	133,575	2.2%	0.4%	164,330	2.5%	0.5%	188,255	2.6%	0.5%
Scottish Gaelic	N/A	N/A	N/A	N/A	N/A	N/A	1,090	0.0%	0.0%
Serbian	51,665	0.8%	0.2%	56,420	0.9%	0.2%	57,350	0.8%	0.2%
Serbo-Croatian	12,510	0.2%	0.0%	10,155	0.2%	0.0%	9,555	0.1%	0.0%
Slovak	18,825	0.3%	0.1%	17,580	0.3%	0.1%	17,580	0.2%	0.1%
Slovene	13,135	0.2%	0.0%	10,775	0.2%	0.0%	9,790	0.1%	0.0%
Spanish	345,345	5.6%	1.1%	410,670	6.3%	1.2%	458,850	6.3%	1.3%
Swedish	8,220	0.1%	0.0%	7,350	0.1%	0.0%	6,840	0.1%	0.0%
Ukrainian	134,500	2.2%	0.4%	111,540	1.7%	0.3%	102,485	1.4%	0.3%
Welsh	N/A	N/A	N/A	N/A	N/A	N/A	1,075	0.0%	0.0%
Yiddish	16,295	0.3%	0.1%	15,205	0.2%	0.0%	13,555	0.2%	0.0%

European mother tongue by language (2021)
Language	Population (2021)	% of non-official language mother tongue speakers in Canada (2021)	% of all language mother tongue speakers in Canada (2021)
Afrikaans	12,270	0.2%	0.0%
Albanian	29,265	0.4%	0.1%
Armenian	33,720	0.4%	0.1%
Belarusan	720	0.0%	0.0%
Bosnian	13,820	0.2%	0.0%
Bulgarian	19,035	0.2%	0.1%
Catalan	905	0.0%	0.0%
Croatian	43,500	0.6%	0.1%
Czech	20,025	0.3%	0.1%
Danish	9,945	0.1%	0.1%
Dutch	80,315	1.0%	0.2%
Estonian	4,485	0.1%	0.0%
Finnish	12,200	0.2%	0.0%
Flemish	2,935	0.0%	0.0%
Frisian	1,570	0.0%	0.0%
German	272,865	3.5%	0.8%
Greek	93,335	1.2%	0.3%
Hungarian	51,500	0.7%	0.1%
Icelandic	905	0.0%	0.0%
Italian	319,505	4.1%	0.9%
Irish	665	0.0%	0.0%
Latvian	4,430	0.1%	0.0%
Lithuanian	6,130	0.1%	0.0%
Low Saxon	1,270	0.0%	0.0%
Macedonian	14,795	0.2%	0.0%
Maltese	4,425	0.1%	0.0%
Norwegian	3,535	0.0%	0.0%
Pennsylvania German	9,065	0.1%	0.0%
Plautdietsch	33,200	0.4%	0.1%
Polish	160,170	2.0%	0.4%
Portuguese	240,680	3.1%	0.7%
Romanian	93,160	1.2%	0.3%
Russian	197,905	2.5%	0.5%
Rusyn	500	0.0%	0.0%
Scottish Gaelic	425	0.0%	0.0%
Serbian	57,425	0.7%	0.2%
Serbo-Croatian	N/A	N/A	N/A
Slovak	15,255	0.2%	0.0%
Slovene	7,965	0.1%	0.0%
Spanish	538,870	6.9%	1.5%
Swedish	5,890	0.1%	0.0%
Swiss German	7,575	0.1%	0.0%
Ukrainian	84,705	1.1%	0.2%
Welsh	825	0.0%	0.0%
Yiddish	12,060	0.2%	0.0%

=== Religion ===
Religious affiliation amongst European Canadians by region of origin (2021 census)
Religious group	Total European origins		Northern European origins		Western European origins		Eastern European origins		Southern European origins	
Religious group	Pop.	%	Pop.	%	Pop.	%	Pop.	%	Pop.	%
Christian	11,158,150	58.54%	6,281,290	52.47%	4,737,295	57.77%	2,007,640	54.72%	1,834,225	72.15%
Catholic	5,698,835	29.9%	2,310,585	19.3%	2,770,940	33.79%	982,770	26.79%	1,410,140	55.47%
Protestant (Note: Including "Anabaptist", "Anglican", "Baptist", "Jehovah's Witness", "Latter Day Saints", "Lutheran", "Methodist and Wesleyan (Holiness)", "Pentecostal and other Charismatic", "Presbyterian", "Reformed", "United Church", and "Other Christian and Christian-related traditions" responses.)	3,691,080	19.36%	3,104,415	25.93%	1,319,535	16.09%	443,815	12.1%	135,675	5.34%
Orthodox	470,950	2.47%	30,510	0.25%	22,600	0.28%	315,460	8.6%	161,085	6.34%
Christian, n.o.s.	1,297,290	6.81%	835,770	6.98%	624,210	7.61%	265,595	7.24%	127,330	5.01%
Irreligious	7,470,295	39.19%	5,488,965	45.85%	3,334,110	40.66%	1,447,840	39.46%	667,695	26.26%
Jewish	179,695	0.94%	41,130	0.34%	30,155	0.37%	142,355	3.88%	12,150	0.48%
Muslim	68,480	0.36%	15,260	0.13%	14,005	0.17%	36,025	0.98%	9,310	0.37%
Buddhist	29,655	0.16%	21,575	0.18%	13,580	0.17%	5,540	0.15%	3,180	0.13%
Indigenous Spirituality	13,310	0.07%	10,015	0.08%	6,020	0.07%	1,760	0.05%	880	0.03%
Hindu	6,950	0.04%	4,335	0.04%	2,015	0.02%	1,165	0.03%	1,150	0.05%
Sikh	4,650	0.02%	3,225	0.03%	870	0.01%	520	0.01%	620	0.02%
Other	130,930	0.69%	105,700	0.88%	61,885	0.75%	26,085	0.71%	13,030	0.51%
European Canadian Total	19,062,115	100%	11,971,485	62.8%	8,199,935	43.02%	3,668,925	19.25%	2,542,235	13.34%
Note: Totals greater than 100% due to multiple origin responses.

=== Immigration ===
European immigrant population in Canada
Year	Population	% of immigrants in Canada	% of Canadian population
1986	2,430,470	62.2%	9.3%
1991	2,364,695	54.5%	8.4%
1996	2,334,005	47.0%	7.9%
2001	2,287,535	42.0%	7.4%
2006	2,269,705	36.7%	7.0%
2011	2,226,100	30.8%	6.5%
2016	2,082,765	27.6%	5.7%
2021	1,967,620	23.5%	5.3%

== Culture ==
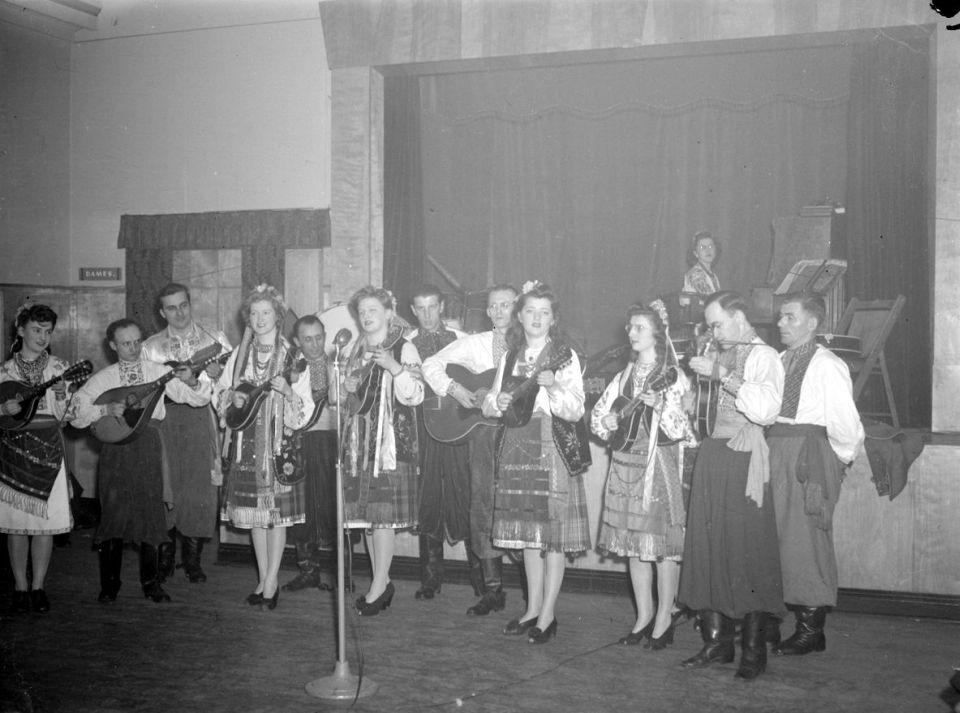
Ukrainian Mandolin Orchestra in May 1945

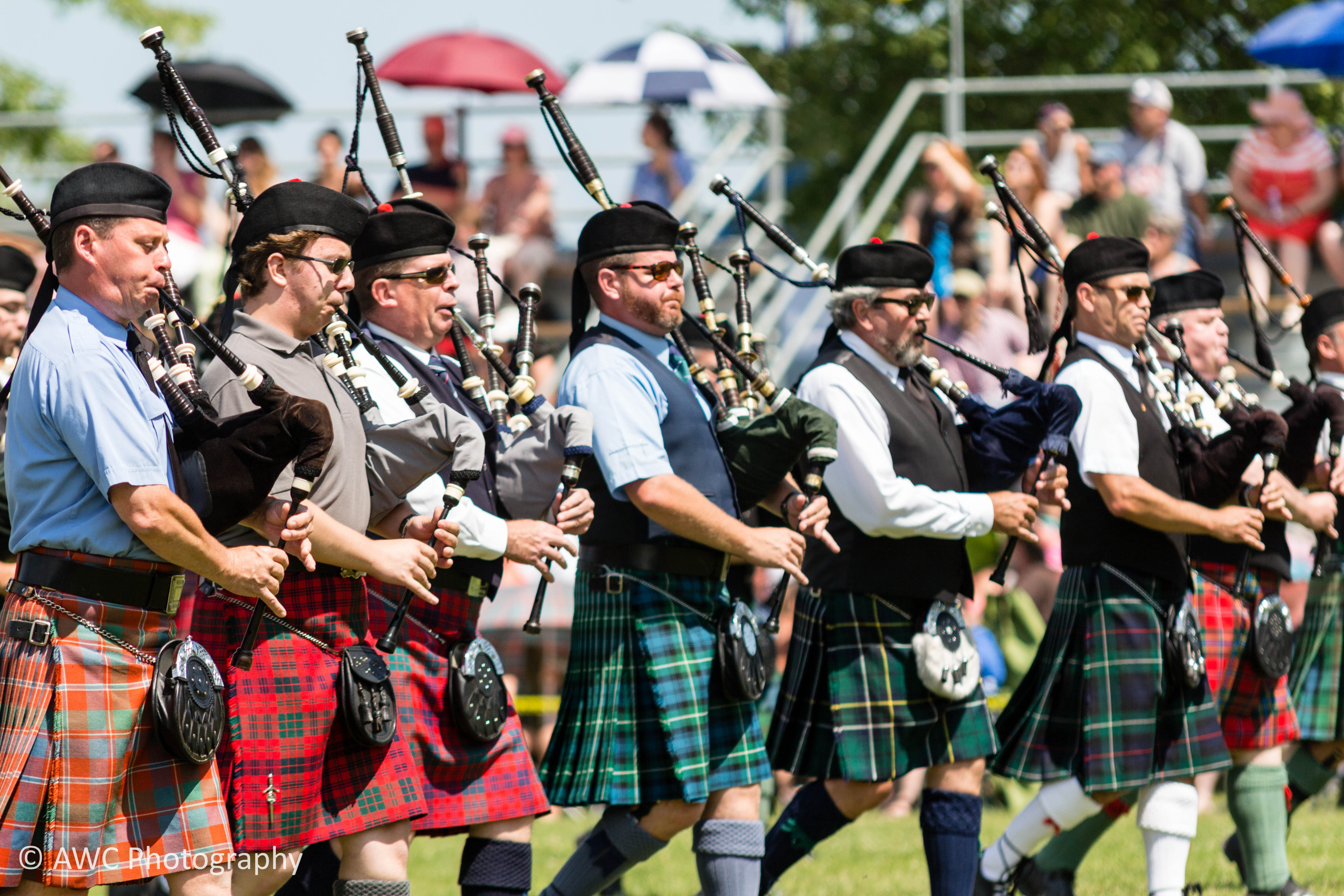
Fergus Scottish Festival and Highland Games in Fergus, Ontario. August 2014.

The various cultures of the Canadians of European descent have had a predominant influence on the culture of Canada. Over time, many people of European Canadian origins have brought with them or contributed literature, art, architecture, cinema and theater, religion and philosophy, ethics, agricultural skills, foods, medicine, science and technology, fashion and clothing styles, music, language, business, economics, legal system, political system, and social and technological innovation to Canadian culture. European settlers brought with them European plants, animals, viruses and bacteria, remaking significant portions of the Canadian ecology and landscape in the image of their homelands. Canadian culture evolved in large part from the culture that the English, French, Scottish, Welsh, and Irish settlers brought with them, long before Canada became a country. Much of English-Canadian culture shows influences from the cultures of the British Isles, with later influence, due to 19th-century immigration from different regions of Europe, such as Eastern Europe. Colonial ties to Great Britain and the cultural presence of the United States spread the English language, legal system and other cultural attributes.

=== Subcultures ===
Elements of Aboriginal, French, British and more recent immigrant customs, languages and religions have combined to form the culture of Canada and thus a Canadian identity, without eradicating specific regional or cultural identities such as Aboriginal or Québecois. Canada has also been strongly influenced by its linguistic, geographic and economic neighbour, the United States.

Many Canadians see the Cultural mosaic, which promotes multiculturalism and an equality of cultures, as a distinctive feature of Canadian culture, one that sets it apart from the melting pot philosophy of many Americans.

Prior the mid-19th century, the vast majority of European migrants to Canada derived from North Sea-adjacent populations, such as the Celtics, French, British, and Germanic populations. However, the period after the mid-19th century saw the introduction of non-North Sea European migrants such as Slavs, non-Gallo-Romance language, and Uralic speakers.

=== Music ===
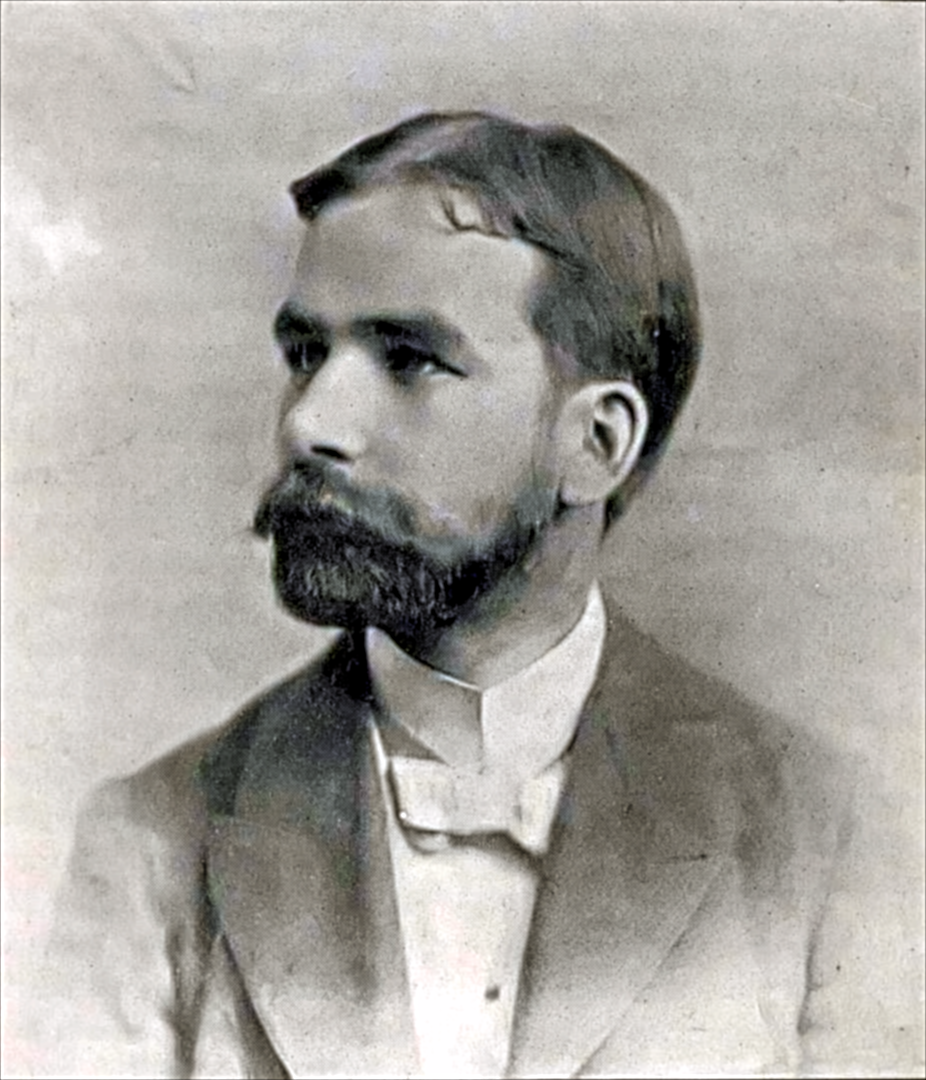
Scottish-Canadian Robert Stanley Weir wrote the lyrics to O Canada.

Another area of cultural influence are Canadian Patriotic songs:

- Canadian National Anthem – Two Canadians of French descent Adolphe-Basile Routhier wrote the lyrics and Calixa Lavallée composed the music in 1880. The English lyrics were written in 1908 by Scottish-Canadian Robert Stanley Weir. The lyrics have also been translated into many other languages spoken by different Canadian minority populations, including other European languages.
- The Maple Leaf Forever – An older but unofficial national anthem written by Scotsman Alexander Muir in 1867. It was in consideration for official national anthem, however, as no French version was ever written, it was never popular with Francophones.

=== Sport ===
- Ice Hockey – British soldiers and immigrants to Canada and the United States brought their stick-and-ball games with them and played them on the ice and snow of winter. Ice hockey was first played in Canada during the early nineteenth century, based on similar sports such as field hockey that were played in Europe. Although stick-and-ball games are common to many cultures, including those of the indigenous people of the Americas, European Canadians created a distinctive variation. The sport was originally played with a stick and ball, but in 1860 a group of English veterans from the Royal Canadian Rifle Regiment played a game in Kingston, Ontario, using a puck for what is believed to be the first time. This match, played on the frozen harbour by the city, is sometimes considered to be the birth of modern ice hockey. According to legend, the first hockey pucks were molded from fresh cow dung that was then allowed to freeze in below-zero outdoor temperatures. Whether or not this was how the first puck was made, the use of horse or cow droppings was common thereafter, a distinctively Euro-Canadian aspect of the game made possible by the country's Northern climate.

== Diaspora ==
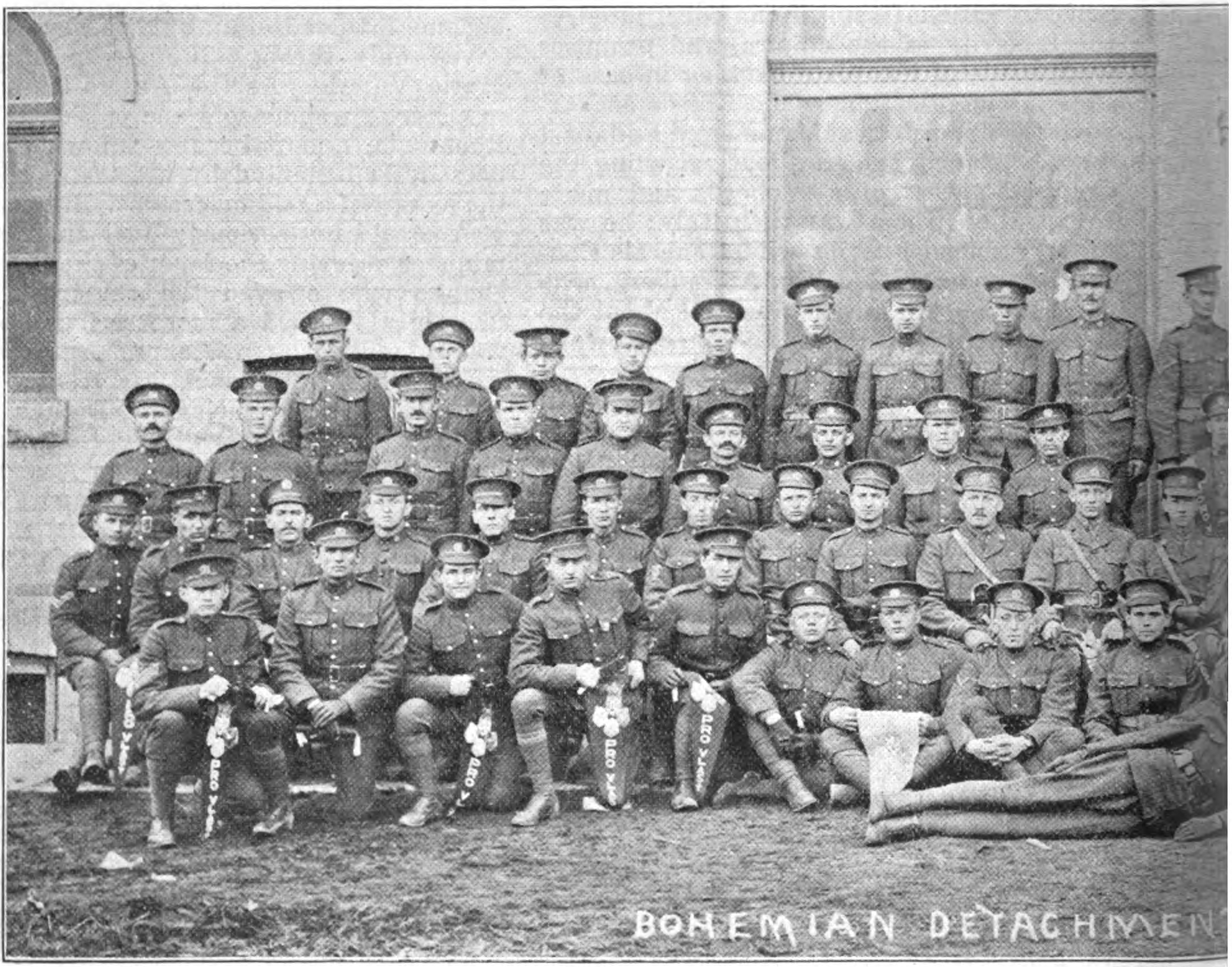
Czech Canadians in the Bohemian detachment of the 223rd Battalion, CEF, 1917

Substantial numbers of European Canadians of French extraction migrated to New England beginning in the late nineteenth century, taking jobs in the cotton mills there and forming a Catholic French-speaking immigrant community. Between 1840 and 1930, almost a million Quebecers migrated to New England to work in its factories, mills, potato fields and logging camps.

Notable Franco-Canadian Americans have included authors Jack Kerouac, Grace Mettalious and Annie Proulx.

== See also ==
- European emigration
- Métis people (Canada)
- Ethnic origins of people in Canada
- European Americans
- Demographics of Canada
