= Czechoslovak Canadians =

Czechoslovak Canadians may refer to:

- Czech Canadians
- Slovak Canadians
