= Albanian Canadians =

Canadians of partial or full Albanian ancestry

Total population
- Canada 41,625 (2021)
Further information
Regions with significant populations
Greater Toronto Area • Windsor, Ontario • Montreal • Edmonton • Calgary
Ontario	25,975
Québec	3,760
Alberta	2,935
British Columbia	1,925
Saskatchewan	605
Manitoba	415
Nova Scotia	285
New Brunswick	115
Prince Edward Island	100
Newfoundland and Labrador	50
Yukon	10

Languages
- English; French; Albanian

Religion
- Islam (Sunni Islam and Bektashism); Christianity (Roman Catholicism and Eastern Orthodoxy); Irreligion

Related ethnic groups
- Albanian diaspora European Canadians Albanian Americans

Albanian Canadians (Albanian: shqiptaro-kanadezët; French: albanais-canadien) are Canadians of full or partial Albanian ancestry and heritage in Canada. They trace their ancestry to the territories with a large Albanian population in the Balkans among others to Albania, Italy, Kosovo, North Macedonia and Montenegro. They are adherents of different religions and are predominantly Muslims though there are also many who adhere to Christianity.

In 2021, there were 41,620 Canadian citizens of Albanian descent living in Canada. The Albanian Canadians are predominantly distributed in the provinces of Ontario and Quebec followed by growing communities in Alberta and British Columbia.

== History ==
The Albanian migration in Canada began in the early 20th century, when the first Albanians emigrated to this country. This emigration was due to internal uprisings that occurred in their country of origin. However, after World War II (1939–1945) very few Albanians moved to Canada, and most arrived from Yugoslavia, due to a communist regime in Albania, which prohibited foreign travel. Most Albanians who emigrated to Canada country after the war decided to settle in Montreal or Toronto. There were also some Albanian workers who lived in Calgary and Ontario (e.g. Peterborough). Despite this migration, by 1986, less of 1,500 Albanians emigrated to Canada. However, in 1991, the Albanian community exceeded the 2,500 people. In the 1990s, the economic and political upheavals experienced in the Balkans as a whole (including in Albania and Kosovo) led to significant Albanian migration abroad, including to Canada. This is when the Albanian migration to Canada reached its peak.

Between 1998 and 1999, a new war prompted a second wave of immigration of Albanians in Canada. This armed conflict was a clash between Albanian and Serb authorities, both military and police, which caused many Albanians to feel compelled to leave Kosovo as refugees, many of them emigrating to Canada. Thus, in 1999, the Government of Canada established a residency program to allow the settlement of 7,000 refugees of Kosovar Albanian origin.

As with professionals from other countries, there has been a large influx of young Albanian professionals who immigrate to Canada for a better life.

According to the 2006 census, there were 22,395 people of ethnic Albanian descent living in Canada, most of whom 11,385 (51%) lived in Toronto. Hamilton, Kitchener, London, Ottawa and Peterborough are areas elsewhere in Ontario which also have Albanian communities.

== Demographics ==
As of the 2016 census, 36,185 Canadian residents, or roughly 0.11% of the population of Canada, stated they had Albanian ancestry. Approximately 72% of the Albanian population reside in the province of Ontario followed by Quebec and Alberta. The majority of the Albanian population were predominantly concentrated in the metropolitan areas and agglomerations of Toronto and Montréal.

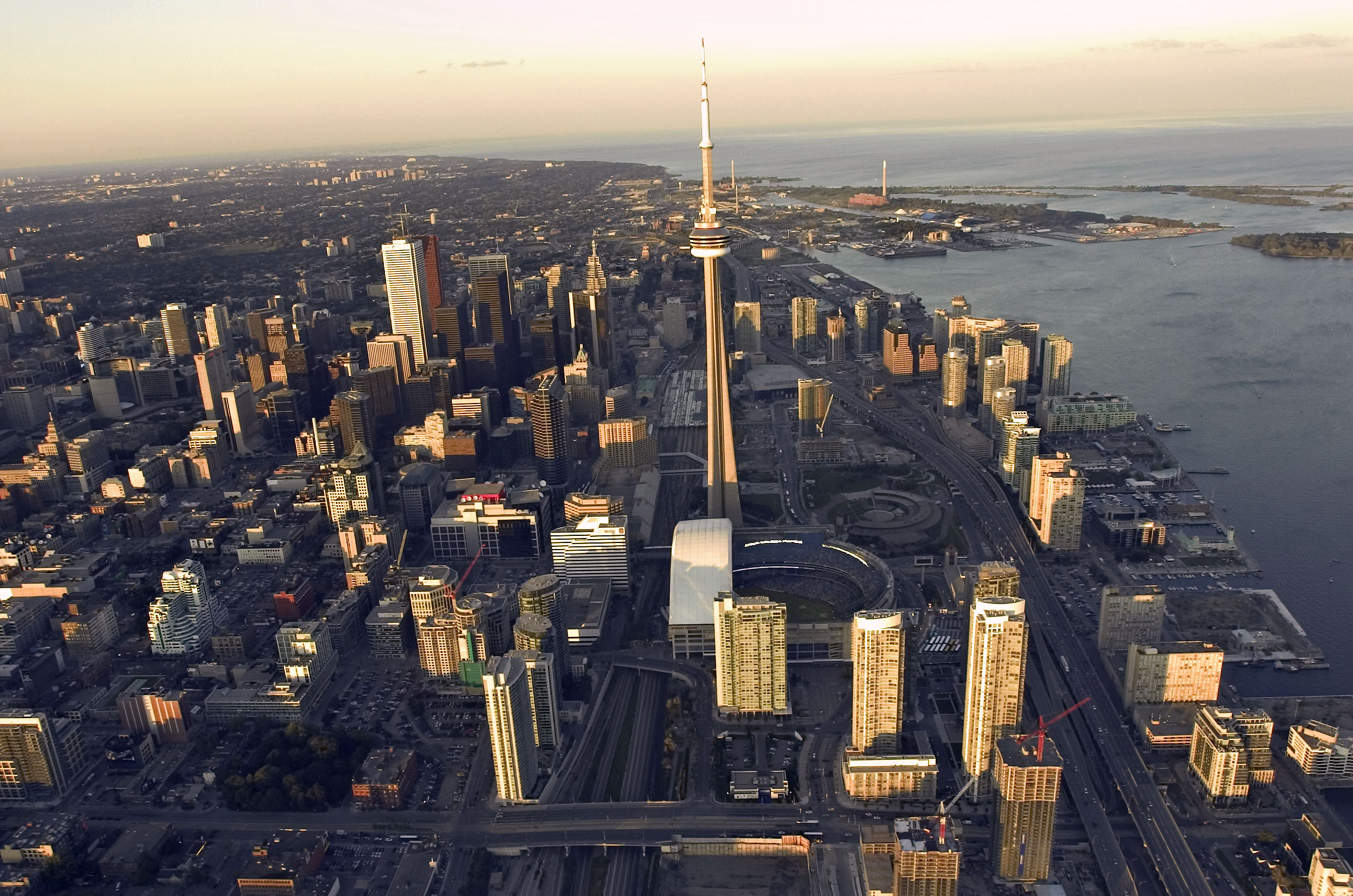
In Toronto, there are around 17,000 Albanians.

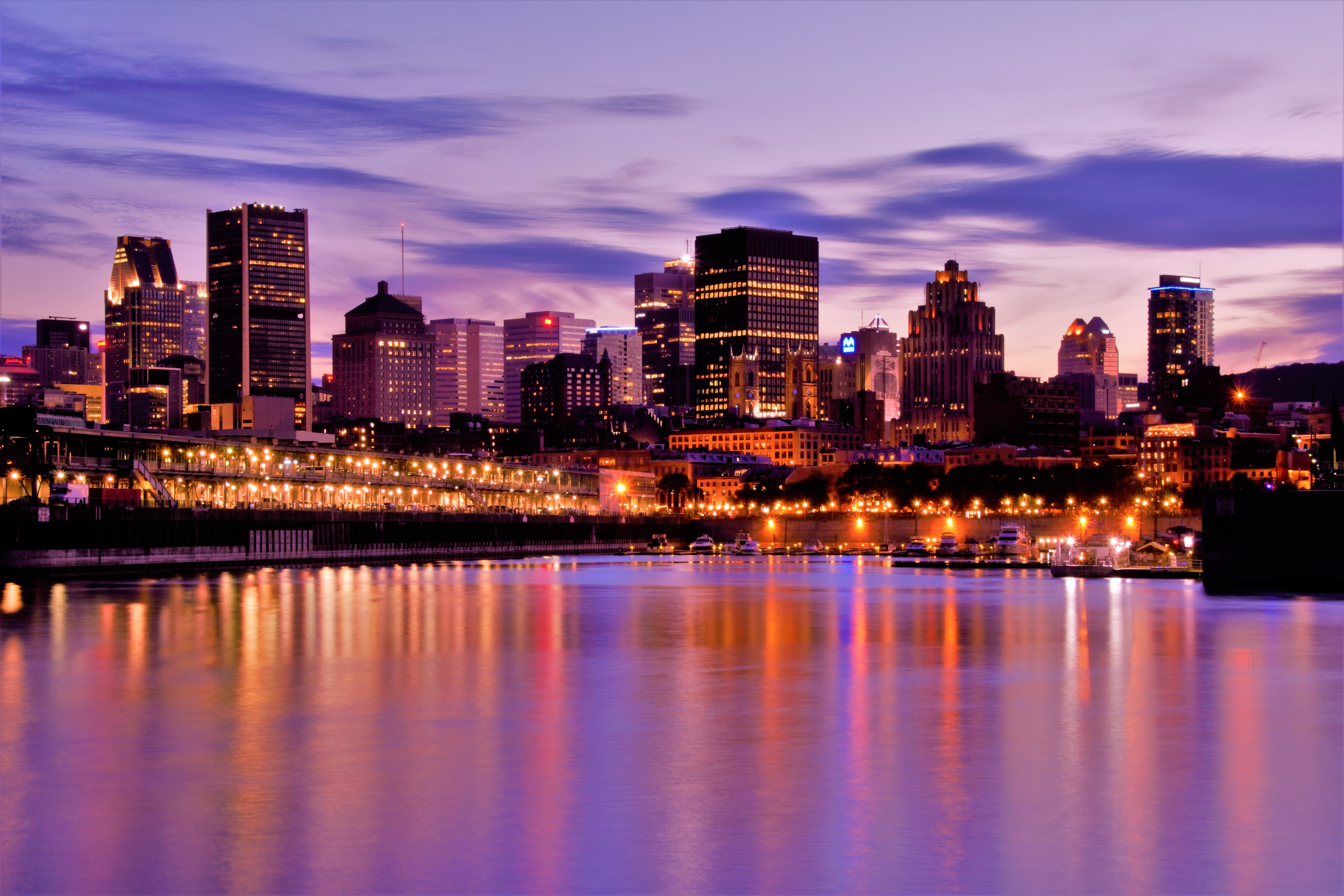
In Montreal, there are around 3,000 Albanians.

There are also 2,870 Canadian residents, or roughly 0.01% of the population of Canada, who stated that they had Kosovar ancestry. They are geographically distributed as well as in the particular regions with Albanian populations such as in Ontario, Quebec and Alberta.

Windsor, Ontario is 0.6% Albanian, much higher than the Canadian national rate of 0.1%. The city is south of Detroit, a U.S. city with another large Albanian community within its metro area.

Province or territory	Albanians 2011	% 2011	Albanians 2016	% 2016
Alberta	1,540	0.04%	2,935	0.08%
British Columbia	1,380	0.04%	1,925	0.04%
Manitoba	265	0.02%	415	0.03%
New Brunswick	115	0.02%	115	0.02%
Newfoundland and Labrador	55	0.01%	50	0.01%
Northwest Territories	15	0.04%	0	0.00%
Nova Scotia	70	0.01%	285	0.03%
Nunavut	0	0.00%	0	0.00%
Ontario	21,175	0.17%	25,975	0.20%
Prince Edward Island	115	0.08%	100	0.07%
Québec	3,425	0.04%	3,760	0.05%
Saskatchewan	120	0.01%	605	0.06%
Yukon	0	0.00%	10	0.03%
Canada	28,270	0.09%	36,185	0.11%

=== Religion ===
Albanian Canadian demography by religion
Religious group	2021 (Note: Religious breakdown proportions based on "Albanian" ethnic or cultural origin response on the 2021 census.)		2001 (Note: Religious breakdown proportions based on "Albanian" ethnic or cultural origin response on the 2001 census.)	
Religious group	Pop.	%	Pop.	%
Christianity	14,960	35.94%	4,705	31.5%
Islam	13,335	32.04%	8,195	54.87%
Irreligion	13,100	31.47%	2,000	13.39%
Judaism	45	0.11%	20	0.13%
Buddhism	25	0.06%	10	0.07%
Hinduism	0	0%	10	0.07%
Indigenous spirituality	0	0%	0	0%
Sikhism	0	0%	0	0%
Other	155	0.37%	10	0.07%
Total Albanian Canadian population	41,625	100%	14,935	100%

Albanian Canadian demography by Christian sects
Religious group	2021		2001	
Religious group	Pop.	%	Pop.	%
Catholic	7,430	49.67%	2,110	44.85%
Orthodox	5,280	35.29%	1,980	42.08%
Protestant	485	3.24%	335	7.12%
Other Christian	1,765	11.8%	280	5.95%
Total Albanian Canadian christian population	14,960	100%	4,705	100%

== Culture ==
=== Organizations ===
Albanian Canadians founded many organizations in Canada, to maintain their language, traditions and culture. Some of these association have also helped other immigrants adapt to Canadian life. Many of these partnerships are in Toronto, a major city of the Albanian population. In this city, the largest associations are the Albanian Muslim Society of Toronto (founded in 1954) and the Albanian-Canadian Community Association of Toronto (founded in 1990). There are also other notable organizations, such as the Albanian Canadian Organization of Ottawa.

== Notable people ==
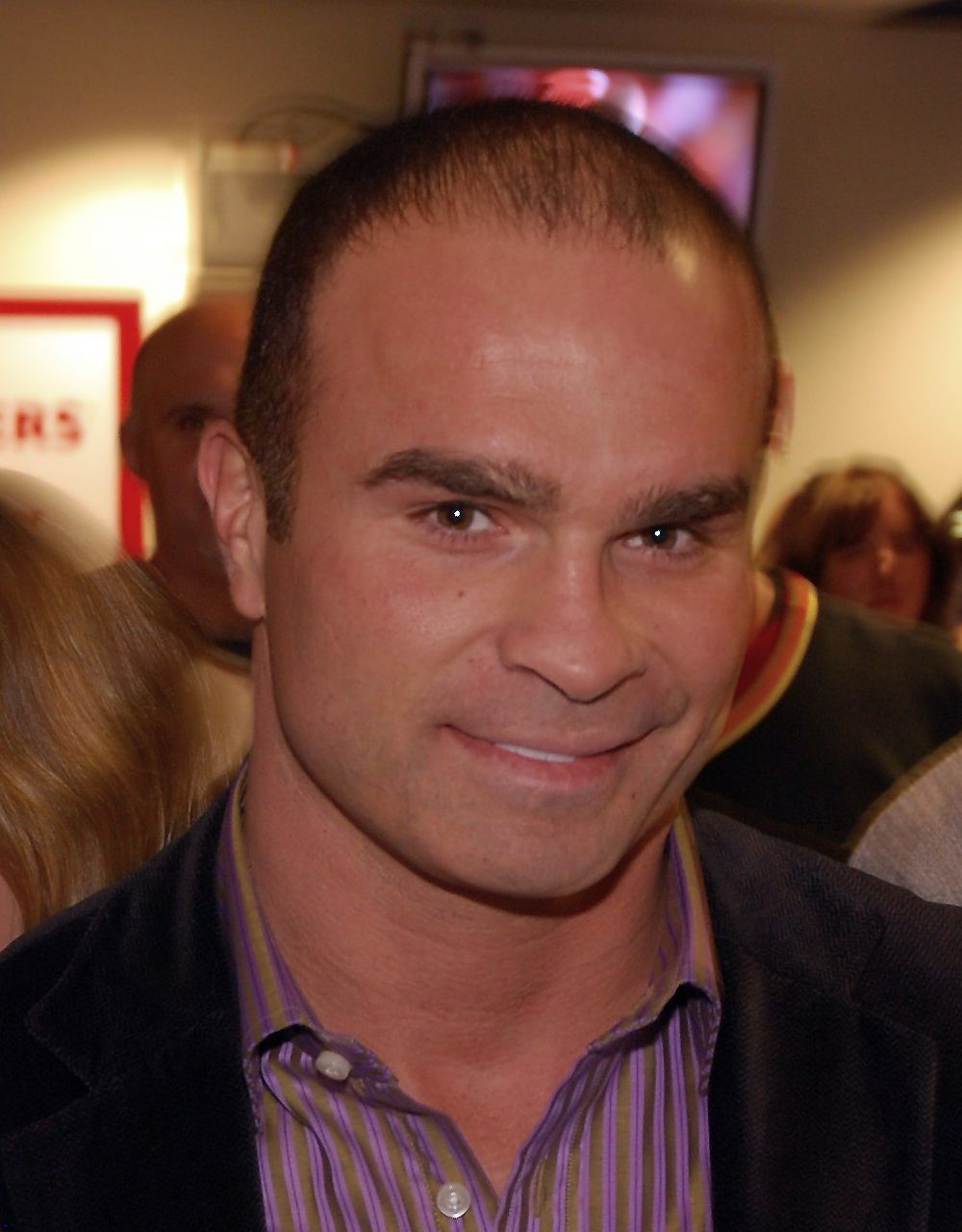
Tie Domi is s former ice hockey player and enforcer, who played for the Toronto Maple Leafs, New York Rangers and Winnipeg Jets over a 16-year NHL career.

- Klaidi Cela – footballer
- Peter Dajia – shot putter
- Max Domi – hockey player
- Tie Domi – hockey player
- Arlind Ferhati – footballer
- Elvir Gigolaj – footballer
- Ana Golja – actress and singer
- Eric Margolis – Journalist
- Kadrush Radogoshi – writer
- Bujar Llapaj – Conductor
- Kristi Pinderi – activist
- Markela Bejleri – footballer, 3 caps for the Albanian national team
- Arber Xhekaj – Hockey Player

== See also ==
- European Canadians
- Albanian diaspora
- Albania-Canada relations
