= Ion Păscăluță =

Bessarabian politician

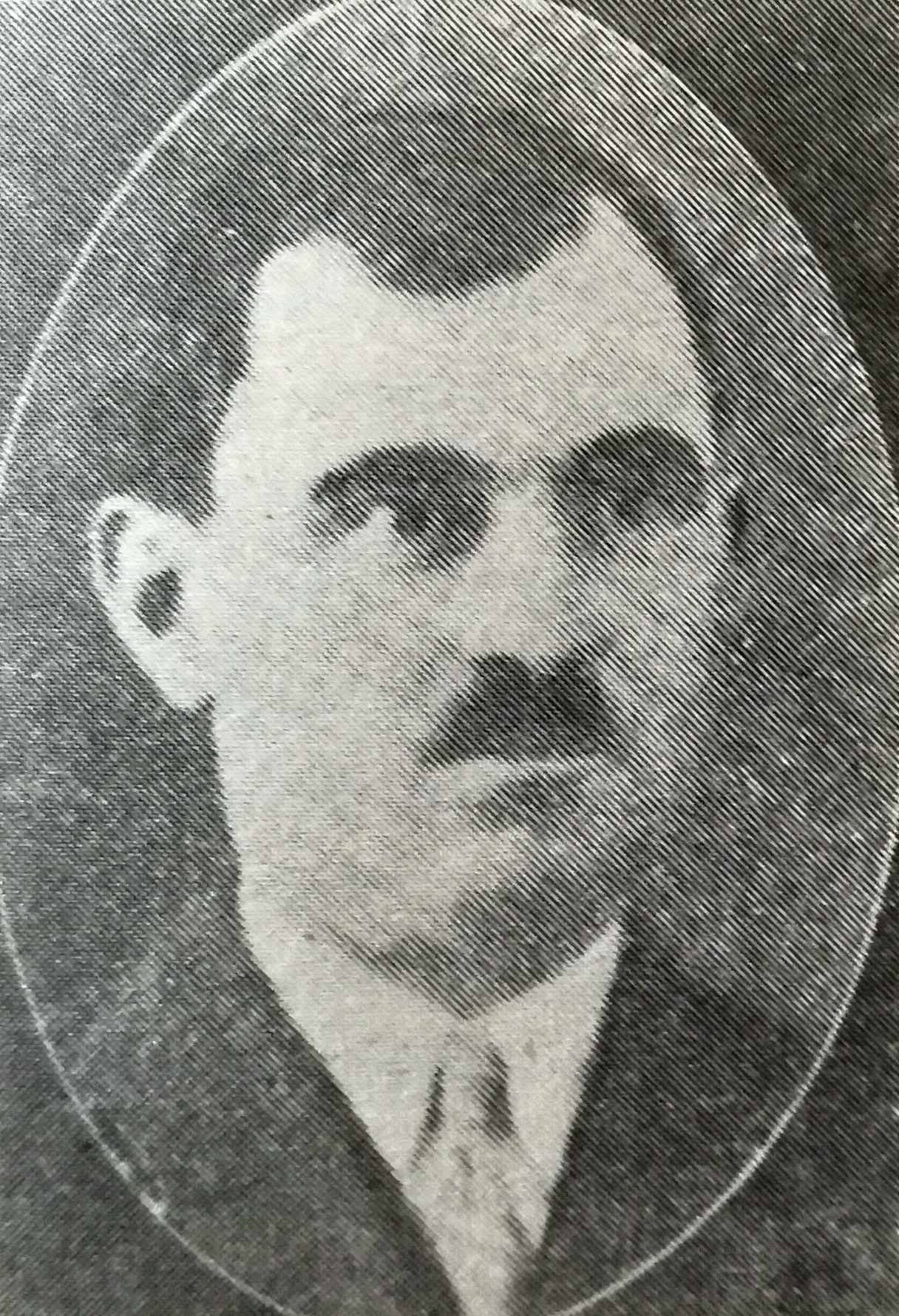
- 1918 - Pascaluta Ion.jpg

Member of the Moldovan Parliament
- In office 1917–1918

Personal details
- Born: January 7, 1890 Fălești, Bessarabia Governorate, Russian Empire
- Died: October 10, 1988 (aged 98) Canada
- Resting place: Toronto, Canada
- Party: Moldavian National Party

Ion Păscăluță was a Bessarabian and Romanian politician.

== Early life and education ==
Ion Păscăluță was born on 7 April 1890 in Fălești, Bălți County, near the Prut River. He completed primary and secondary education and decided early in life to pursue a military career.

== Military career ==
In 1914, Păscăluță graduated from the Infantry Officers’ School and was sent to the Southwestern Front in Galicia, fighting against German and Austro-Hungarian forces. During this period, he encountered Romanian soldiers from Transylvania and Bukovina serving in the opposing army, sparking acts of solidarity. He was wounded in 1916 and decorated with the Order of St. George, First Class, by the Russian Army.

Later, his regiment was stationed in southern Bessarabia, where he arrived in Odessa and became active in the Moldovan national movement among soldiers. Alongside Emanoil Catelli, Anton Crihan, Ștefan Holban, Simeon Murafa, Nicolae Ciornei, and Constantin Osoianu, he helped organize the Moldovan Soldiers’ Committee in Odessa, advocating for autonomy, independence, and the national rights of Bessarabians.

== Political activity ==
=== Involvement in the Moldovan military movement ===
On 14 May 1917, Păscăluță was one of the organizers of the Odessa Soldiers’ Committee. The Committee focused on forming military units led by Moldovan officers and conducting military training in Romanian. These units aimed to protect Moldovan villages from armed Bolshevik revolutionary bands.

Păscăluță participated in the First Congress of Moldovan Teachers (30 April 1917) and gave speeches promoting Romanian-language education and church services in Moldovan communities. He also took part in the military discussions of 1–5 September 1917 regarding the potential union of Bessarabia with Romania, advocating for a conditional union that would initially preserve a democratic independent republic.

=== Role in Sfatul Țării ===
Păscăluță was elected deputy to the Sfatul Țării by the Moldovan Soldiers’ Congress and the Executive Committee of the Odessa garrison. He served from 21 November 1917 to 27 November 1918, was a member of the Interpellations Committee, and acted as administrator of the Sfatul Țării premises.

=== Delegation to Petrograd ===
During the 1917 Russian Revolution, Păscăluță was sent to Petrograd by the Supreme Command to liaise with corresponding authorities in Petrograd and Chișinău and to request approval for a major Congress of Moldovan Soldiers. He petitioned for the renaming of several military units with Romanian-nationalist titles.

He voted in favor of the Union of Bessarabia with Romania on 27 March 1918. Păscăluță was also involved in drafting the statute of the Moldavian National Party and served as assistant to the chairman of the Executive Committee of the Moldovan garrison. He emphasized autonomy guarantees for Bessarabia and opposed the later annulment of union conditions, highlighting concerns about quorum and legality during the 9 April 1918 session.

=== Advocacy and later activities ===
He actively monitored the entry of foreign troops, particularly Romanian forces, into Bessarabia in 1918, emphasizing that they should remain under the authority of the Moldovan Military Directorate. Păscăluță organized military and political structures to maintain order during this turbulent period and participated in drafting administrative regulations for Bessarabia.

== Later life and exile ==
After the Union, Păscăluță held minor civil service positions in Chișinău, including chief of the financial section of the city hall until 1938. He was awarded the Order of Ferdinand I for his national, social, and political contributions.

During the 1940 Soviet occupation of Bessarabia and Northern Bukovina, he and his family fled to Bucharest, where he worked at the Bucharest City Hall. Post-World War II, he avoided the persecution of the Romanian communist and Soviet security services, taking minor administrative jobs while being monitored by the communist authorities. In 1971, at the age of 82, he emigrated to Canada to join his children and published memoirs detailing the union of Bessarabia with Romania and the struggle against historical falsifications by Soviet authorities. He sent letters to the governments of Canada, United States, United Kingdom, France, Japan and even the Soviet Union and the CSCE, in which he denounced the Soviet rule in Moldova and the Yalta Agreements. He also sent a letter to Petru Pascari, the head of government of the Moldavian SSR, in which he denounced the historical falsification regarding Sfatul Țării and the union of Bessarabia with Romania, as well as the Moldovenization campaign enforced by the Soviet authorities. His efforts were supported by the Romanian-Canadian Society of Toronto, led by dr. O. M. Petrovici.

== Death ==
He died on 10 October 1988 in Canada, at the age of 97, and was buried in Toronto. A street in Călugăr, Fălești District is named after him.

== Personal life ==
Ion Păscăluță married Ludmila Butichevici (his second wife), a refugee from Russia, and had three children: Nina (b. 1911), Iolanta (b. 1923), and Octavian (b. 1925), who lived in Canada as well. He owned a house and 50 hectares of land in Romania as a Sfatul Țării deputy.

== Gallery ==
Moldovan stamp, 1998

== See also ==
- Anton Crihan
- Romanian Canadians
- Moldovan Canadians

== Bibliography ==
- Gheorghe E. Cojocaru, Sfatul țării: itinerar, Civitas, Chișinău, 1998, ISBN 9975-936-20-2
- Mihai Tașcă, Sfatul Țării și actualele autorități locale, "Timpul de dimineață", no. 114 (849), June 27, 2008 (page 16)
