= Moldovan Canadians =

Canadians of Moldovan birth or descent

Total population
- 20,465 (by ancestry 2021 Canadian census)

Regions with significant populations
- Quebec and Ontario

Languages
- Canadian French · Canadian English · Romanian · Russian

Religion
- Christianity · Judaism

Moldovan Canadians are Canadians of full or partial Moldovan background. According to the 2021 Canadian census, there were 20,456 Canadians who claimed Moldovan ancestry mainly in Toronto and Montreal.

== History ==
The diplomatic relations between the Republic of Moldova and Canada were established on February 20, 1992 and celebrated 30 years in February 2022. According to the 2011 Census, there were 8,050 Canadians who claimed Moldovan ancestry. Several non-governmental organizations have since been created in Canada by the Moldovan community such as:

- Moldovan Community of Calgary Association, (chair Victoria Bogdanas), Calgary
- Moldovan Community of Toronto in Ontario, (chair Maria Tonu), Toronto
- Moldovan Community of Quebec, (chair Ala Mândâcanu), Montreal
- Koolture Tricolore, (chair Nata Albot), Montreal
- Moldova Canada Link, (chair Dorin Ciupac), Toronto

According to data provided by the Ministry of Foreign Affairs of Moldova, Trade and Development of Canada, an estimated 40,000-50,000 Canadians of Moldovan origin live in Canada, mainly in Toronto and Montreal. In November 2008, The Moldovan Community of Quebec (CMQ) was established as a non-profit. In 2010, the first Moldovan Orthodox church, with services in the Moldovan language, has been established for the Moldovan community in Montreal, Quebec, which has over 3,500 Moldovan families. Ala Mândâcanu is the head of the Moldovan community in Quebec.

== Notable people ==
- Nata Albot, TV producer and journalist
- Bronfman family, business family
- Samuel Bronfman, businessman, philanthropist
- Călin Calaidjoglu, professional football player
- Tatiana Cocsanova, rhythmic gymnast
- Mihail Gherasimencov, professional football player
- Rudolph Hennig, politician
- Ala Mândâcanu, politician and journalist
- Ion Păscăluță, former member of Sfatul Țării
- Jason Rusu, sprint canoer
- Ekaterina Shulaeva, retired tennis player
- Elena Semikina, actress and beauty pageant titleholder
- Robert Steinberg, mathematician
- Irina Terehova, actress and model
- Joseph Thauberger, politician

== See also ==
- Moldovan diaspora
- Immigration to Canada
- Moldovan Americans
- Romanian Canadians
- Russian Canadians
- Ukrainian Canadians
