= Anton Crihan =

Bessarabian politician

Member of Sfatul Țării
- In office 1917–1918

Personal details
- Born: July 10, 1893 Sîngerei, Bessarabia Governorate
- Died: January 9, 1993 (aged 99) St. Louis, Missouri, United States
- Resting place: Chişinău
- Party: National Peasants' Party
- Spouse: Olivia Lula
- Children: Dumitru Crihan (1924–1999)
- Education: Odessa University, Paris-Sorbonne University

Anton Crihan (10 July 1893 – 9 January 1993) was a Bessarabian politician, lawyer, author, economist, professor and journalist. He was a member of Sfatul Țării (1917), adviser to the Secretary of State for Agriculture in the General Directorate of the Republic of Moldova (1917), deputy in the Parliament of Romania (1919, 1920, 1922, 1932), adviser to the Secretary of State at the Ministry of Agriculture and Domains (1932–1933), professor at the Polytechnic University of Iasi and at the Faculty of Agronomy in Chișinău (1934–1940).

== Biography ==
Anton Crihan is the representative of the thirteenth generation, male, of the old Moldavian boyar family, the first mention of the reign of Stephen the Great. The Prince's Book of Constantine Movilă states that Anton Crihan's ancestors honored the boyar's title of "paharnic". He studied at the Bălți High School for boys and the University of Odessa, Faculty of Economics.

Crihan served as Member of Sfatul Țării (1917–1918), the Parliament of Romania, and the Government of Romania. After World War I and the Communist revolution in Russia, Crihan, was among the handful of campaigners who succeeded in annexing most of Bessarabia to Romania. He became politically active in Romania, which was then governed by a constitutional monarchy. Trained as an economist, he served on the Central Committee of the National Peasant Party, was elected to several terms in Parliament and was appointed Agriculture Minister. After the Soviet takeover, Crihan went into hiding and then fled on foot. He made his way across Europe spending time in Paris to complete a PhD in economics at the Sorbonne. He finally arrived in the United States in 1949, where he delivered lectures and wrote articles and books championing the reunification of Moldavia and Romania. In the United States he married Olivia Lula, a niece of Petru Groza. Moldavia, now known as Moldova, gained independence when the Soviet Union disintegrated in late 1991.

He died in St. Louis, United States, but to his will, he was buried in Chișinău (in the Central Cemetery).

== Works ==
- Capitalul străin în Rusia (1915)
- Chestiunea agrară în Basarabia (1917)
- Cum s'a facut unirea Basarabiei cu România (1969)
- O scrisoare catre Generalul C. Petre-Lazar (1976)
- Romanian Rights to Bessarabia According to Certain Russian Sources (1986)

== Honours ==
- Order Ferdinand I
- Steaua României
- A street in the center of Chișinău, the capital of Moldova, has been named after Anton Crihan.

== Gallery ==
Moldovan stamp, 1998

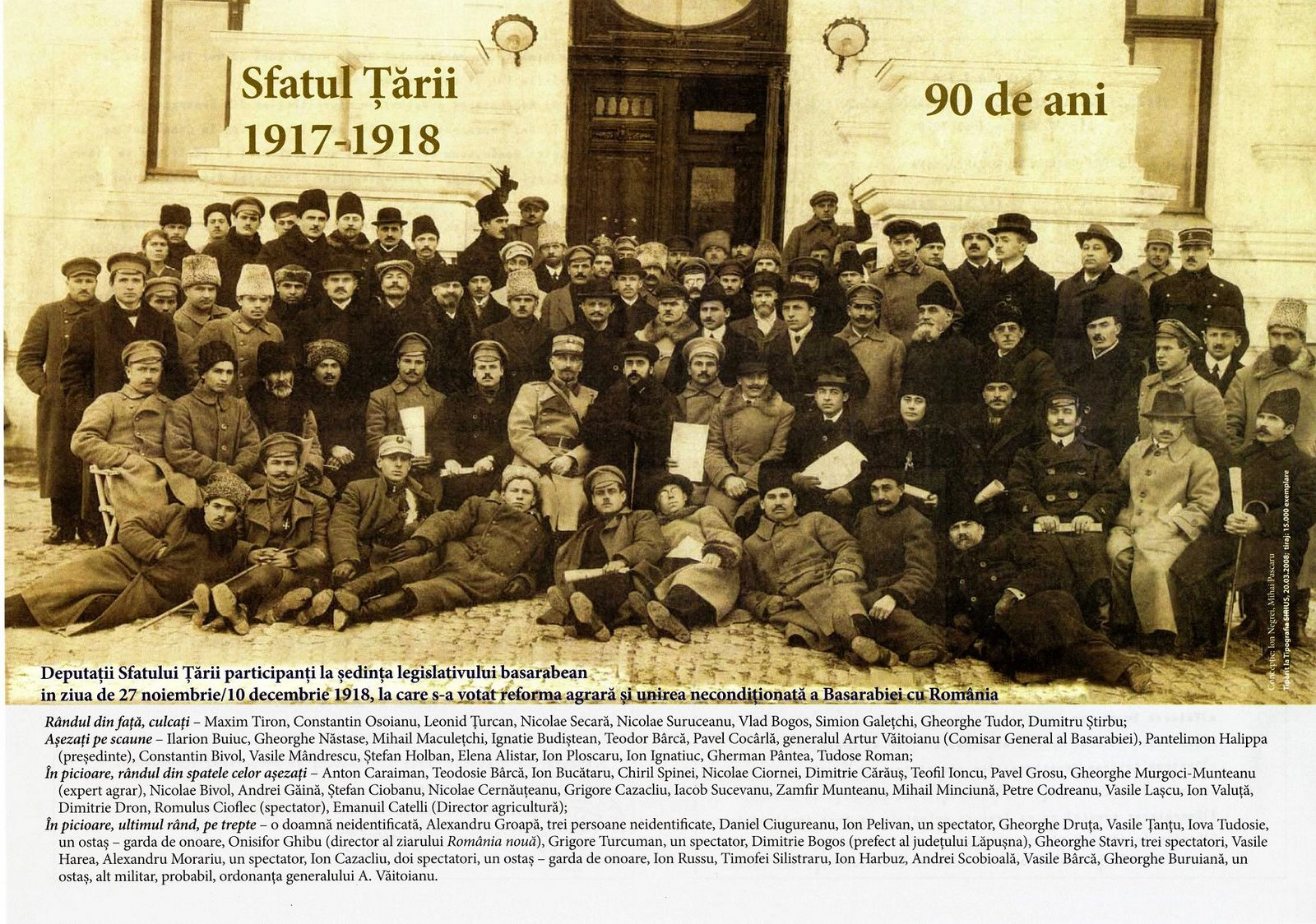
Sfatul Țării Palace, December 10, 1918

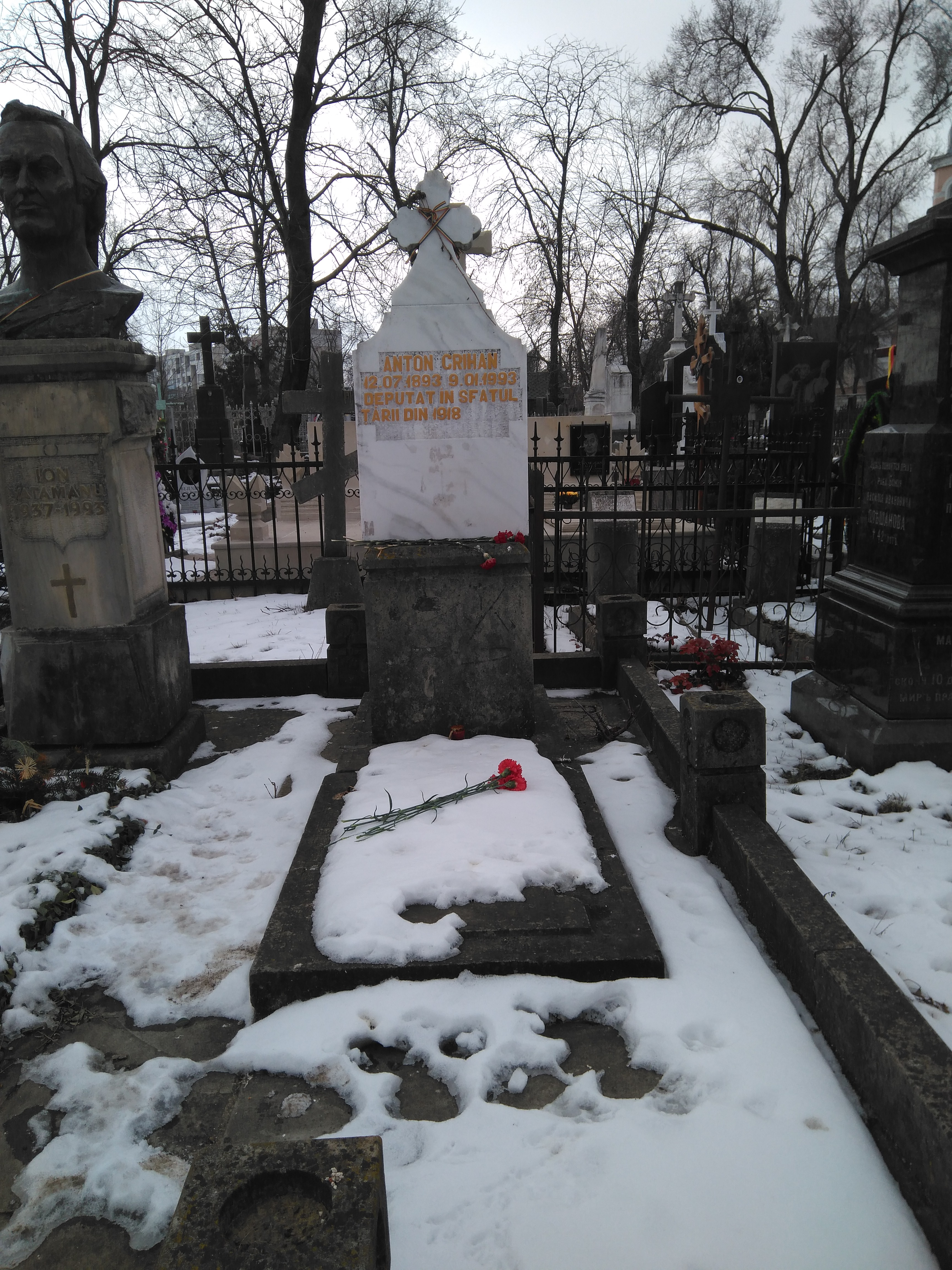
Anton Crihan's Grave in Chișinău

== See also ==
- Ion Păscăluță
- Romanian Americans
- Moldovan Americans

== Bibliography ==
- Gheorghe E. Cojocaru, Sfatul Țării: itinerar, Civitas, Chişinău, 1998, ISBN 9975-936-20-2
- Mihai Taşcă, Sfatul Țării şi actualele autorităţi locale, "Timpul de dimineaţă", no. 114 (849), June 27, 2008 (page 16)
- Eremia, Anatol (2001) (în română). Unitatea patrimoniului onomastic românesc. Toponimie. Antroponimie (ed. ediţie jubiliară). Chişinău: Centrul Naţional de Terminologie, ed. "Iulian". p. 57. ISBN 9975-922-45-7.
- Alexandru Chiriac. Membrii Sfatului Ţării. 1917–1918. Dicţionar, Editura Fundaţiei Culturale Române, București, 2001.
