= Basque Canadians =

Canadian citizens of Basque descent

Euskal kanadarrak (Basque) Basco-canadiens (French) Canadienses vascos (Spanish)

Regions with significant populations
- Atlantic Canada, Quebec, Ontario
- 7,745 (by ancestry, 2021 Census)

Languages
- Canadian English, French, Spanish, and Basque

Religion
- Roman Catholicism, Protestantism

Related ethnic groups
- Basques, Basque Americans, French Canadians, Spanish Canadians

Basque Canadians (Basque: Euskal kanadarrak) are Canadian citizens of Basque descent, or Basque people who were born in the Basque Country and reside in Canada. As of 2021, 7,745 people claimed Basque ancestry.

Basque sailors were whaling and fishing around Newfoundland beginning in 1525 and ending around 1626.

== See also ==
- French Canadians
- Spanish Canadians
- Basque colonization of the Americas

== Sources ==
- Encyclopedia of Canada's Peoples. "Basques.". Multicultural Canada.
