= Czech Canadians =

Čeští Kanaďané

Total population
- 94,805 (by ancestry, 2011 Census) Additional 40,035 Czechoslovaks

Regions with significant populations
- Alberta, British Columbia, Ontario

Languages
- Canadian English, Canadian French and Czech

Religion
- Predominantly Irreligion · Roman Catholic (minority) · Judaism

Related ethnic groups
- Czech Americans, Slovak Canadians

Czech Canadians are Canadian citizens of Czech ancestry or Czech-born people who reside in Canada. They were frequently called Bohemian Canadians until the late 19th century. According to the 2021 Canadian census, there were 98,925 Canadians of full or partial Czech descent.

== Number of Czech and Czechoslovak Canadians ==
Data from this section from Statistics Canada, 2016.

	Percent
Canada— Total	0.4%
Newfoundland and Labrador	0.0%
Prince Edward Island	0.0%
Nova Scotia	0.2%
New Brunswick	0.1%
Quebec	0.1%
Ontario	0.4%
Manitoba	0.5%
Saskatchewan	0.7%
Alberta	0.8%
British Columbia	0.7%
Yukon	0.6%
Northwest Territories	0.3%
Nunavut	0.0%

== Notable people ==
- Karla Homolka - serial killer
- Vasek Pospisil - tennis player
- Jenna Talackova - model, TV personality
- Otto Jelinek - businessman, former figure skater, politician
- Thomas J. Bata - businessman, "Shoemaker to the World"
- Josef Škvorecký - writer, publisher
- Ivan Reitman - director
- Jamie Oleksiak - hockey player
- Penny Oleksiak - swimmer, Olympic gold medallist
- David Nykl - actor
- Vaclav Smil - scientist and policy analyst
- Karina Gould - politician
- Travis Konecny - hockey player
- Michael Czerny - Catholic cardinal and Prefect of the Dicastery for Promoting Integral Human Development

== See also ==
- Demographics of the Czech Republic
- Canada–Czech Republic relations
- Czech people
- Czech Americans
- Czech Australians
- Czechs in the United Kingdom
- European Canadians
