= Ala Mândâcanu =

Moldovan politician and journalist (born 1954)

Member of the Moldovan Parliament
- In office 27 February 1994 – 25 February 2001
- Parliamentary group: Bloc of Peasants and Intellectuals; Democratic Convention

Personal details
- Born: 14 December 1954 (age 71) Balatina, Glodeni District, Moldavian SSR, Soviet Union (now Moldova)
- Party: Social Liberal Party
- Spouse: Emil
- Children: 2

Ala Mândâcanu (born 14 December 1954) is a Moldovan politician and journalist. She served as member of the Parliament of Moldova, editor in chief of "Democraţia" (2001–2004), deputy Chairman of the Social Liberal Party, and dean of the Faculty of Journalism. She has been living in Montreal since 2008. Ala Mândâcanu is the head of the Moldovan community in Canada's Quebec.
