= Slovak Canadians =

Total population
- 72,285 (2016 Census); Additional 40,715 Czechoslovaks

Regions with significant populations
- Alberta, British Columbia, Ontario, Quebec

Languages
- Canadian English, Canadian French and Slovak

Religion
- Roman Catholicism, Greek Catholicism, Protestantism, Judaism

Related ethnic groups
- Slovak Americans, Czech Canadians

Slovak Canadians are citizens of Canada who were born in Slovakia or who are of full or partial Slovak ancestry. According to the 2021 Canadian census, there were 68,210 Canadians of full or partial Slovak descent.

== See also ==
- Demographics of Slovakia
- Canada-Slovakia relations
- European Canadians
- Czech Canadians
- Slovak people
- Slovak Americans
