= List of World War I prisoner-of-war camps in Canada =

Twenty-four known prisoner-of-war camps existed across Canada during the First World War. The ethnic groups arrested and detained in internment camps were Austro-Hungarians (mostly Ukrainians) and Germans. Austro-Hungarian Prisoners were mainly residents of Canada from Ukraine, part of Serbia, the Czech Republic, Slovakia. Since Ukraine, part of Serbia, the Czech Republic and Slovakia were then provinces of the empire of Austria-Hungary, many still had Austro-Hungarian citizenship and were considered to be resident enemy aliens. William Dostock, for example, who immigrated to Canada in 1910 from Austria-Hungary and was not yet naturalized was interned from 1915–1920 as an enemy alien.

German prisoners were mainly residents of Canada from Germany. Germans formed a large proportion of the detainees since Canada served as a place of detention for German prisoners of war on behalf of the British.

The prisoners were given various tasks; many worked in the forests as logging crews. In addition to the main camps, there were branch camps and labour camps.

== List ==
Camp	Location	Province	Type of Buildings	Period
Amherst Internment Camp	Amherst	Nova Scotia	Malleable Iron Foundry	April 1915 to September 1919
Beauport Internment Camp	Beauport	Quebec	The Armoury	December 1914 to June 1916
Castle Mountain Internment Camp	Banff & Castle Mountain	Alberta	Dominion Park	July 1915 to July 1917
Brandon Internment Camp	Brandon	Manitoba	Exhibition Building	September 1914 to July 1916
Edgewood Internment Camp	Edgewood	British Columbia	Bunk Houses	August 1915 to September 1916
Fernie & Morrissey	Fernie & Morrissey	British Columbia	Bunk houses	June 1915 to October 1918
Halifax Internment Camp	Halifax	Nova Scotia	Halifax Citadel	September 1914 to October 1918
Jasper Internment Camp	Jasper	Alberta	Dominion Park	February 1916 to August 1916
Kapuskasing	Kapuskasing, Ontario	Ontario	Bunk Houses	December 1914 to February 1920
Kingston Internment Camp	Kingston, Ontario	Ontario	Fort Henry	August 1914 to November 1917
Lethbridge Internment Camp	Lethbridge	Alberta	Exhibition Building	September 1914 to November 1916
Monashee & Mara Lake Internment Camp	Monashee & Mara Lake	British Columbia	Tents and Bunkhouses	June 1915 to July 1917
Montreal Internment Camp	Montreal	Quebec	Immigration Hall	August 1914 to November 1918
Eaton Internment Camp	Munson Eaton	Alberta Saskatchewan	Railway Cars	October 1918 to March 1919
Nanaimo Internment Camp	Nanaimo	British Columbia	Provincial government building	September 1914 to September 1915
Niagara Falls Internment Camp	Niagara Falls	Ontario	The Armoury	December 1914 to August 1918
Petawawa Internment Camp	Petawawa	Ontario	Militia Camp	December 1914 to May 1916
Revelstoke Internment Camp	Revelstoke & Field & Otter	British Columbia	Log Buildings	September 1915 to October 1916
Sault Ste. Marie Internment Camp	Sault Ste. Marie	Ontario	The Armoury	January 1915 to January 1918
Spirit Lake Internment Camp	Spirit Lake	Quebec	Barracks	January 1915 to January 1917
Toronto Internment Camp	Toronto	Ontario	Stanley Barracks	December 1914 to October 1916
Winnipeg Internment Camp	Winnipeg	Manitoba	Fort Osborne Barracks	September 1914 to July 1916
Valcartier Internment Camp	Valcartier	Quebec	Militia Camp	April 1915 to October 1915
Vernon Internment Camp	Vernon	British Columbia	Provincial government building	September 1914 to February 1920

== See also ==
- List of World War II prisoner-of-war camps in Canada
