= War crimes in World War I =

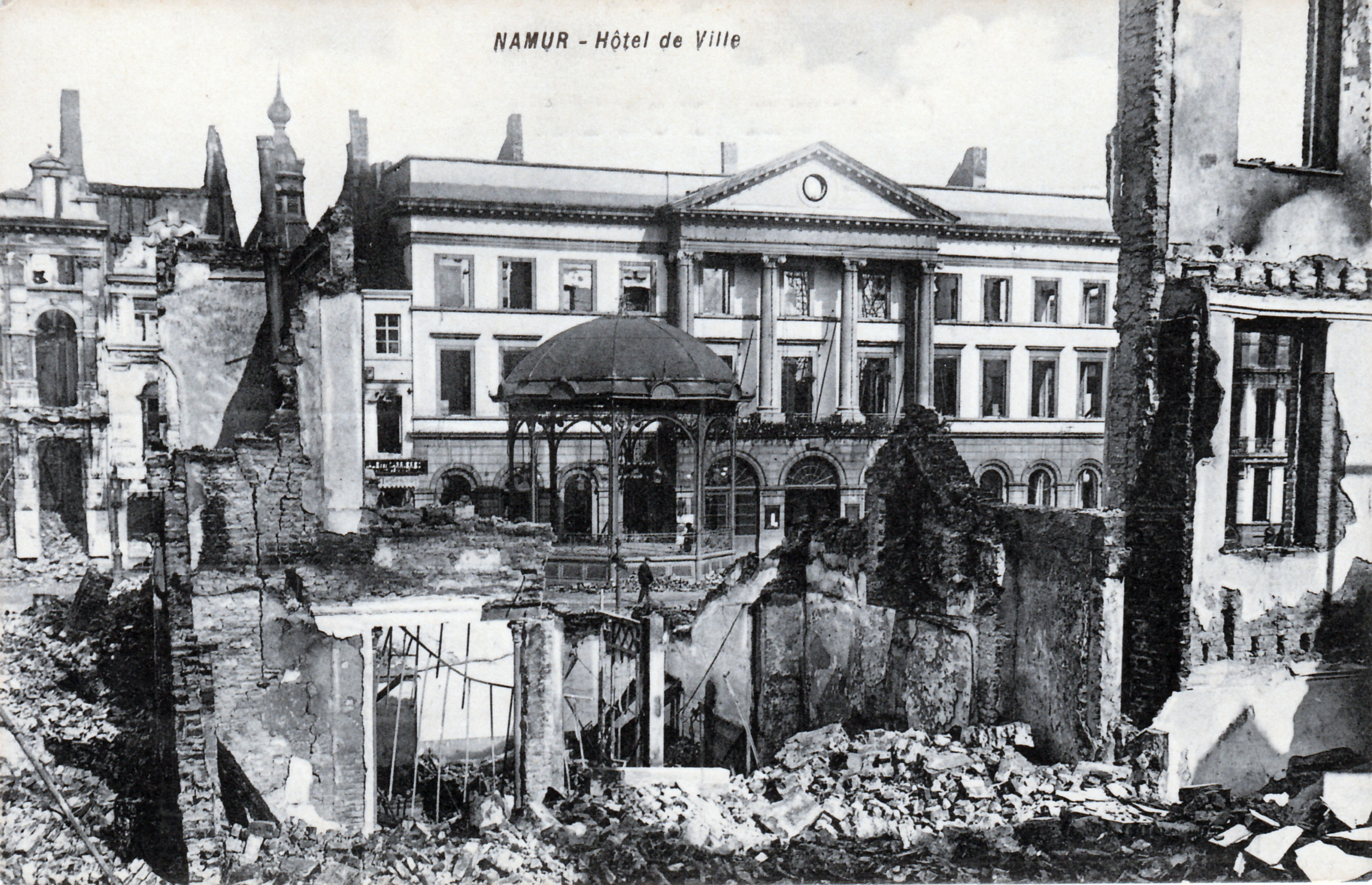
- Namur City Hall, destroyed by the German invasion of Belgium, 1914
- Location: Global
- Date: 1914–1918
- Attack type: Genocide, mass murder, mass shooting, death marches, forced displacement, ethnic cleansing, rape, torture, sexual violence, population transfer, chemical warfare, starvation and other crimes against humanity
- Deaths: 15–22 millions (all war-related deaths)
- Perpetrators: Allied Powers, Central Powers
- Motive: Anti-imperialism, аnti-democracy, imperialism, racist nationalism

During World War I (1914–1918), belligerents from both the Allied Powers and Central Powers violated international criminal law, committing numerous war crimes. This includes the use of indiscriminate violence and massacres against civilians, torture, sexual violence, forced deportation and population transfer, death marches, the use of chemical weapons and the intentional targeting of Red Cross personnel and medical facilities.

The governments of all major combatants had previously signed the Hague Conventions of 1899 and 1907, which these atrocities intentionally violated. Even so, both the decisions to commit, and to refuse to court-martial, the perpetrators of World War I crimes was motivated by what American Civil War historian Thomas Lowry has termed "the European tradition … that to victors belong the spoils - the losers could expect pillage and plunder", and that enemy civilians are "grist for the mills of more hardheaded conquerors such as Genghis Khan, Tamerlane, and Ivan the Terrible."

== Austro-Hungarian war crimes ==
=== Austro-Hungarian invasion and occupation of Serbia ===
==== Collective punishment and massacres of Serbs by Austria-Hungary ====
During the first invasion of Serbia in 1914, Austro-Hungarian forces occupied parts of the country for 13 days. Their war aims were not only to eliminate Serbia as a threat, but also to punish the whole nation for the assassination of Archduke Franz Ferdinand. The invasion and military occupation accordingly turned into a war of annihilation, accompanied by massacres of civilians and the taking and summary execution of hostages. Austro-Hungarian troops committed a number of war crimes against the Serbs, especially in the area of Mačva, where according to historian Geoffrey Wawro, the Austro-Hungarian army subjected the civilian population to a wave of atrocities. During this short occupation, between 3,500 and 4,000 Serb civilians were killed in executions and acts of random violence by marauding troops.

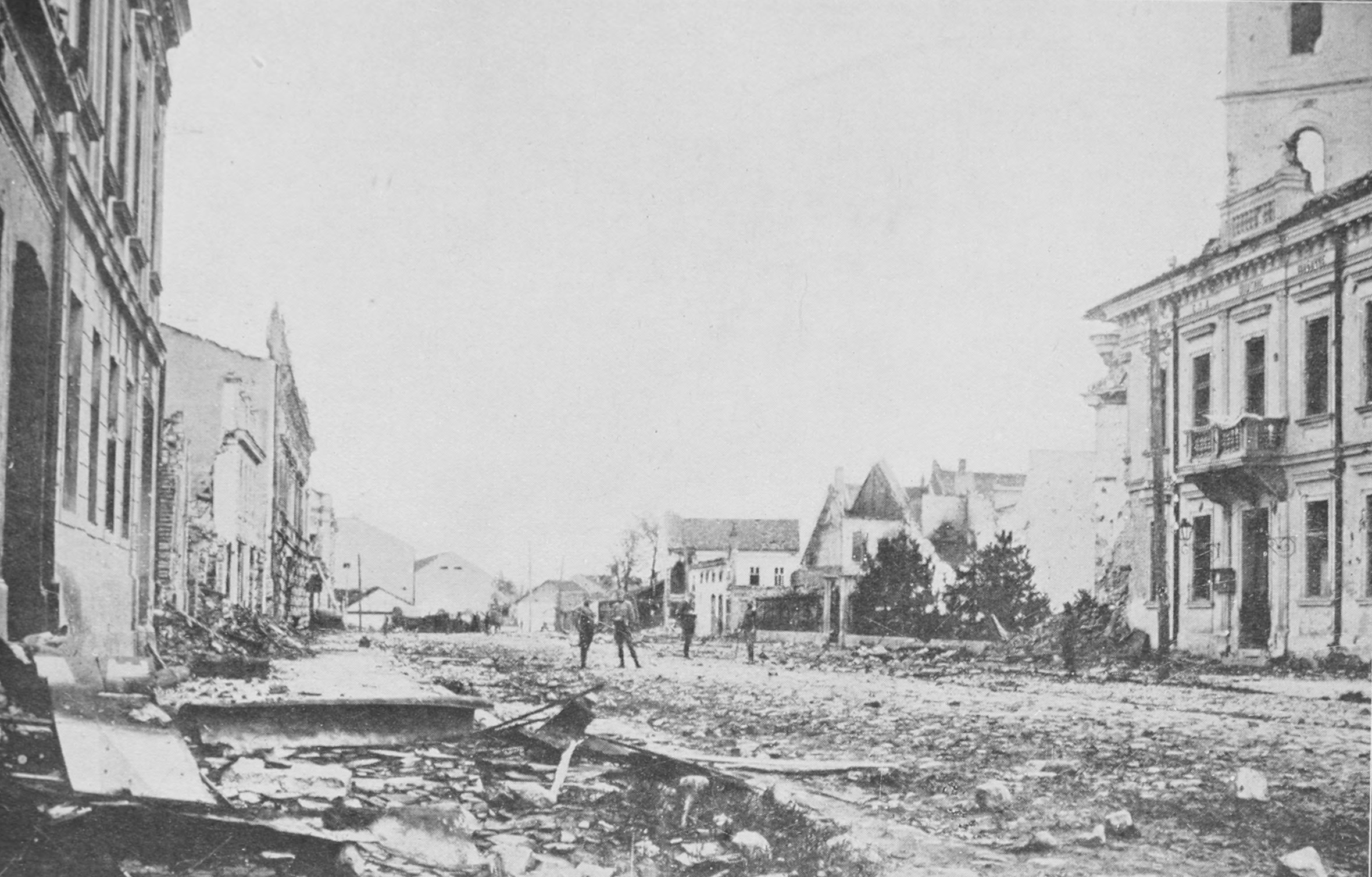
Šabac, pictured in August 1914, was the first target of the Austro-Hungarian punitive expedition and the site of many atrocities committed against the local population

Mass killings took place in numerous towns in northern Serbia. On 17 August 1914, in Šabac, 120 residents—mostly women, children and old men—were shot and buried in a churchyard by Austro-Hungarian troops on the orders of Feldmarschall-Leutnant Kasimir von Lütgendorf. The remaining residents were beaten to death, hanged, stabbed, mutilated or burned alive. A pit was later discovered in the village of Lešnica containing 109 dead peasants who were "bound together with a rope and encircled by wire"; they had been shot and immediately buried, even with some still alive. A claim from a local spy that "traitors" were hiding in a certain house was enough to sentence the whole family to death by hanging. Serbian Orthodox priests were often summarily hanged, under the accusation of spreading the spirit of insurrection among local people. Victims were usually hanged on the main squares of villages and towns, in full view of the general population. The lifeless bodies were left to hang by the noose for several days as an act of intimidation.

Austria's propaganda machinery spread anti-Serb sentiment with the slogan "Serbien muss sterbien" (Serbia must die). During the war, Austro-Hungarian officers in Serbia ordered troops to "exterminate and burn everything that is Serbian", and hangings and mass shootings were everyday occurrences. Austrian historian Anton Holzer wrote that the Austro-Hungarian army carried out "countless and systematic massacres…against the Serbian population. The soldiers invaded villages and rounded up unarmed men, women and children. They were either shot dead, bayoneted to death or hanged. The victims were locked into barns and burned alive. Women were sent up to the front lines and mass-raped. The inhabitants of whole villages were taken as hostages, humiliated and tortured." Multiple source state that 30,000 Serbs, mostly civilians, were executed by Austro-Hungarian forces by the end of 1914.

==== Forced displacement and starvation of Serbs ====
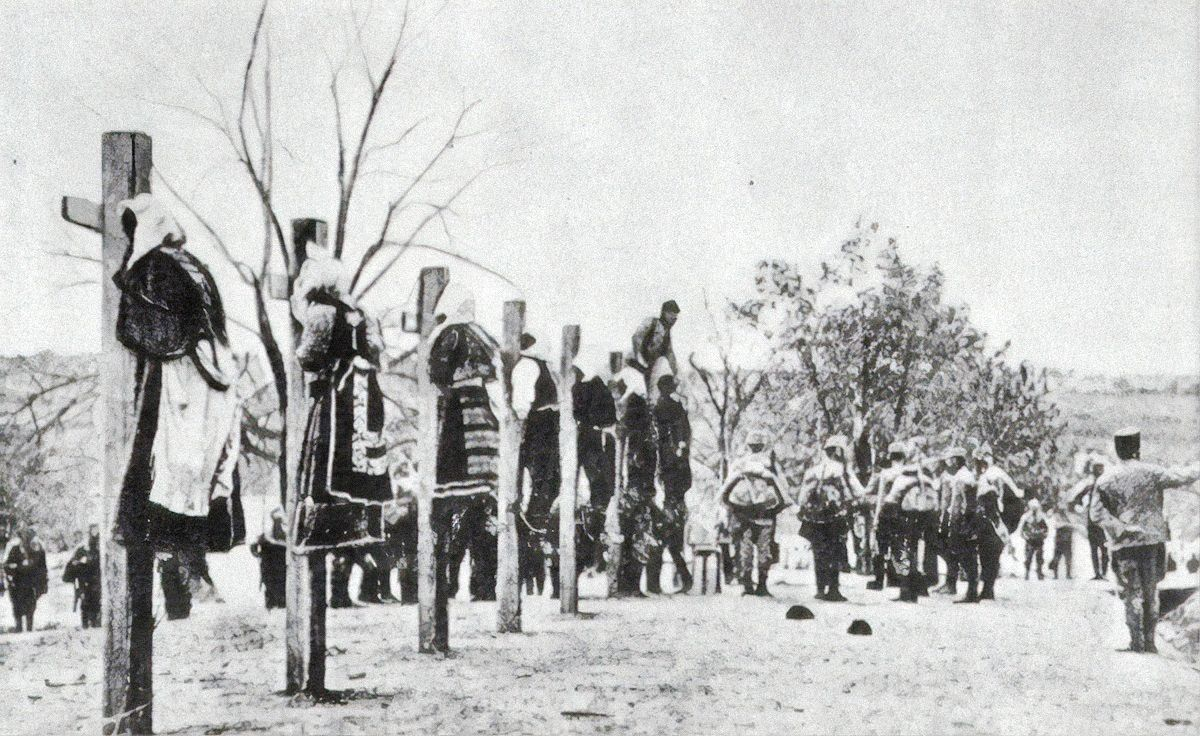
Austro-Hungarian soldiers executing men and women in Serbia, 1916

After being occupied completely in early 1916, both Austria-Hungary and Bulgaria announced that Serbia had ceased to exist as a political entity, and that its inhabitants could therefore not invoke the international rules of war dictating the treatment of civilians as defined by the Geneva Conventions and the Hague Conventions.

The Military General Governorate of Serbia (MGG/S), as well as the High Command in Vienna, considered sending civilian prisoners to internment camps. During the occupation, between 150,000 and 200,000 men, women and children were deported to various camps in Austria-Hungary; it has been estimated they represented slightly more than 10 per cent of the Serb population. Since Serbia did not have its own Red Cross, Serbian prisoners did not have access to the aid the Red Cross provided to other Allied prisoners. Moreover, Serbian prisoners were not considered "enemy aliens" but "internal enemies" by Austria-Hungary's Ministry of War. By defining them as "terrorists" or "insurgents", the Austro-Hungarian authorities were not obliged to disclose the number of captives they held, and which camps they were being held in, to Red Cross societies.

Serbs also suffered from famine; General Franz Conrad von Hötzendorf gave orders for Serbia's resources be "squeezed dry" regardless of the consequences for the population. Looting by occupying soldiers, combined with the food exporting policies of Austria and Germany, caused mass starvation, leading to the deaths of 8,000 Serbians during the winter of 1916. According to a Red Cross report dated 1 February 1918, by the end of 1917, there were 206,500 prisoners of war and internees from Serbia in Austro-Hungarian and German camps. According to the historian Alan Kramer, the Serbians in Austro-Hungarian captivity received the worst treatment of all the prisoners, and at least 30,000–40,000 had died of starvation by January 1918.

=== Thalerhof Internment Camp ===
Austrian authorities rounded up civilians from the province of Galicia and sent them to internment camps, on charges of being part of the Galician Russophilia movement.

=== Doboj Internment Camp ===
45,971 Bosnian Serbs were sent to an internment camp near the city of Doboj, Bosnia between 27 December 1915 and 5 July 1917.

== British and Commonwealth war crimes ==
=== Royal Navy war crimes ===
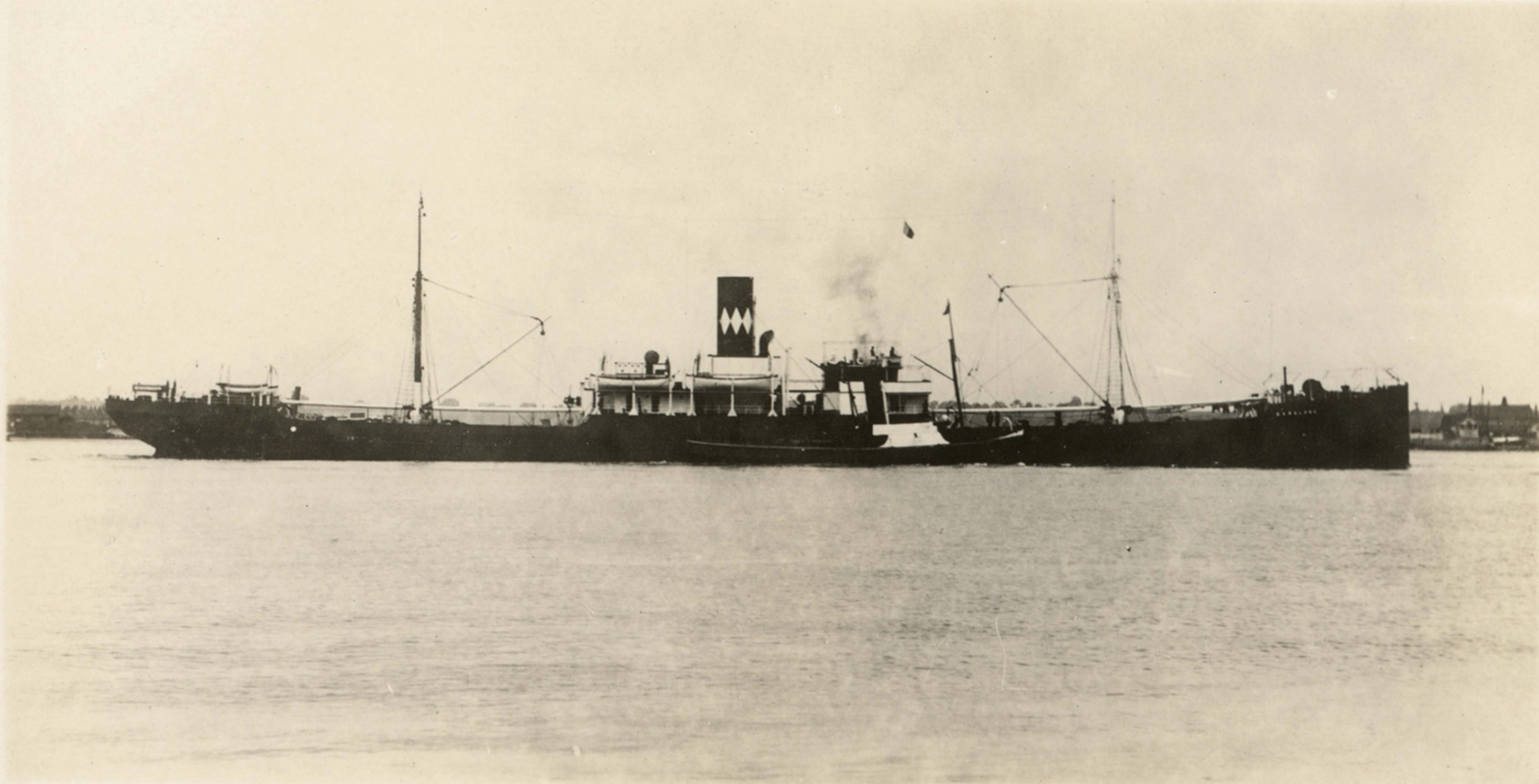
HMS Baralong

On 19 August 1915, the German submarine U-27 was sunk by the British Q-ship HMS Baralong. All German survivors were killed by Baralong's crew on the orders of Lieutenant-Commander Godfrey Herbert, the captain of the ship. The shooting was reported to the media by American citizens who were on board the Nicosian, a British freighter loaded with war supplies, which was stopped by U-27 just minutes before the incident.

On 24 September, Baralong destroyed U-41, which was in the process of sinking the cargo ship Urbino. According to a survivor from the submarine, Baralong continued to fly the US flag after firing on U-41 and then rammed the lifeboat carrying the German survivors, sinking it.

=== Blockade of Germany ===
After the war, the German government claimed that approximately 763,000 German civilians died from starvation and disease during the war because of the Allied blockade. An academic study done in 1928 put the death toll at 424,000. Germany protested that the Allies had used starvation as a weapon of war. Sally Marks argued that the German accounts of a hunger blockade are a "myth", as Germany did not face the starvation level of Belgium and the regions of Poland and northern France that it occupied. Nevertheless, the eventual form of the blockade by mid-1915, being a distant blockade that made no distinction between civilian and military goods, was opposed to both the letter and spirit of the agreed but unratified 1909 London Declaration. This drew initial protest from neutral powers, though over the course of the war they would eventually cooperate with the Allies.

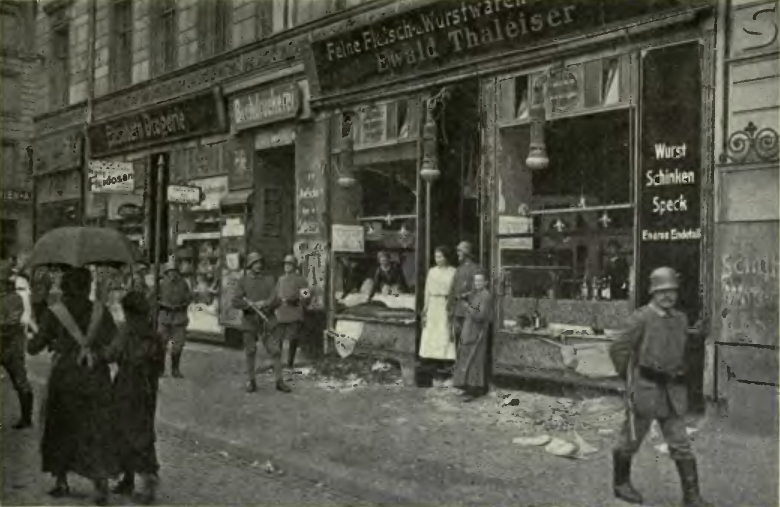
Looted shops caused by food riots in Berlin, 1918

The armistice in November 1918 specified that the blockade would continue until a formal peace agreement. Thus, foodstuffs imports into Germany continued to be controlled by the Allies until German authorities signed the Treaty of Versailles in June 1919. In March 1919, Winston Churchill urged the House of Commons to come to a swift agreement as "Germany is very near starvation." From January 1919 to March 1919, Germany refused to agree to Allied demands that it surrender its merchant ships to Allied ports to transport food supplies. Some Germans considered the armistice to be a temporary cessation of the war and knew, if fighting broke out again, their ships would be seized. Over the winter of 1919, the situation became desperate and Germany finally agreed to surrender its fleet in March. The Allies then allowed for the import of 270,000 tons of foodstuffs.

Both German and non-German observers have argued that the period after the armistice were the most devastating months of the blockade for German civilians, though disagreement persists as to the extent and who is truly at fault. According to Max Rubner, 100,000 German civilians died due to the continued blockade after the armistice. In the UK, Labour Party member and anti-war activist Robert Smillie issued a statement in June 1919 condemning continuation of the blockade, claiming 100,000 German civilians had died as a result.

=== Internment of German-Australians ===
Before a pervasive climate among the Australian guards of excessive cruelty and unnecessary brutality led to an international diplomatic incident, the dismissal with disgrace of their commanding officer, Captain G.E. Hawkes, from the Australian Army, and its permanent closure in 1916, the Torrens Island Concentration Camp in South Australia was used to hold both Central Powers POWs and civilian internees.

=== Internment of Ukrainian Canadians ===
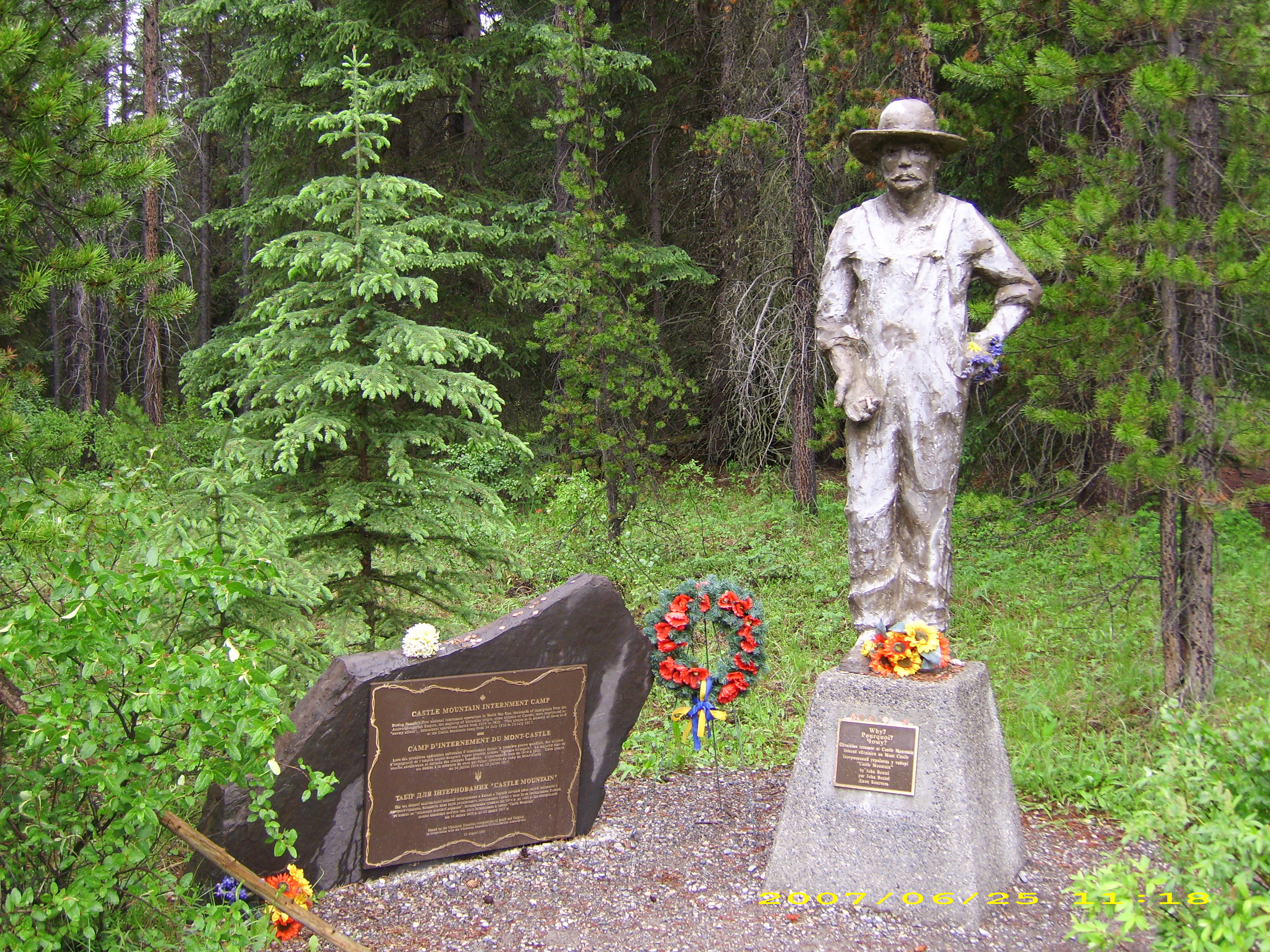
Commemorative plaque and a statue entitled "Why?" / "Pourquoi?" / "Чому (Chomu)?", by John Boxtel at the location of the Castle Mountain Internment Camp, Banff National Park

The internment of Ukrainian Canadians was part of the confinement of enemy aliens in Canada during and for two years after the end of the First World War. It lasted from 1914 to 1920, under the terms of the War Measures Act.

Canada was at war with Austria-Hungary. Along with Austro-Hungarian prisoners of war, about 8,000 Ukrainian men, women, and children – those Ukrainians of Austro-Hungarian citizenship as well as naturalized British subjects of Ukrainian descent – were kept in twenty-four internment camps and related work sites (also known, at the time, as concentration camps). Their savings were confiscated and many had land taken while imprisoned as the land was abandoned. Some were "paroled" from camps in 1916–17, many were put to work as unpaid workers on farms, mines, and railways, where labour was scarce. Much existing Canadian infrastructure from 1916 to 1917 was built by this unpaid labour.

Another 80,000 were not imprisoned but were registered as enemy aliens and obliged to regularly report to the police and were required to carry identifying documents at all times or suffer punitive consequences.

The embarrassment and trauma of internment caused many Ukrainians to change their family names, hide their imprisonment and abandon traditions due to fear of negative repercussions – causing PTSD and intergenerational trauma. In addition, some maintain that the Government of Canada approved key records to be destroyed in the 1950s, leaving documentation to be based on individual family records and pleas to the local communities where the camps were located.

=== Surafend massacre ===
The Surafend massacre (Arabic: مجزرة صرفند) was a premeditated massacre committed against inhabitants of the village of Sarafand al-Amar (modern-day Tzrifin) and a Bedouin camp in Ottoman Palestine by occupying Australian, New Zealand and Scottish soldiers on 10 December 1918. The massacre occurred after the Sinai and Palestine campaign of World War I, Allied occupational forces in the region, in particular Australian and New Zealand troops, grew frustrated over being subject to petty theft and an alleged murder by local Arabs without redress.

On the night of 9 December, a New Zealand soldier named Leslie Lowry was killed by a thief who had stolen his kitbag. Lowry died without speaking. Troops found evidence near his body, including a piece of Arabic clothing and, allegedly, footprints leading towards Surafend. In response, around 200 ANZAC troops massacred its male inhabitants and burned down the village. No one was ever prosecuted for the massacre.

== Bulgarian war crimes ==
=== Bulgarian massacres of Serbs ===
Bulgarian Tsar Ferdinand declared on the eve of war: "the purpose of my life is the destruction of Serbia". Many Bulgarian troops were side-lined from front line duty to take part in the occupation of Serbia, past animosities led to brutality, the local population was left a choice between Bulgarisation or being subject to violence, large scale deportations and the treatment of the residents of the occupation zones came close to genocidal actions.

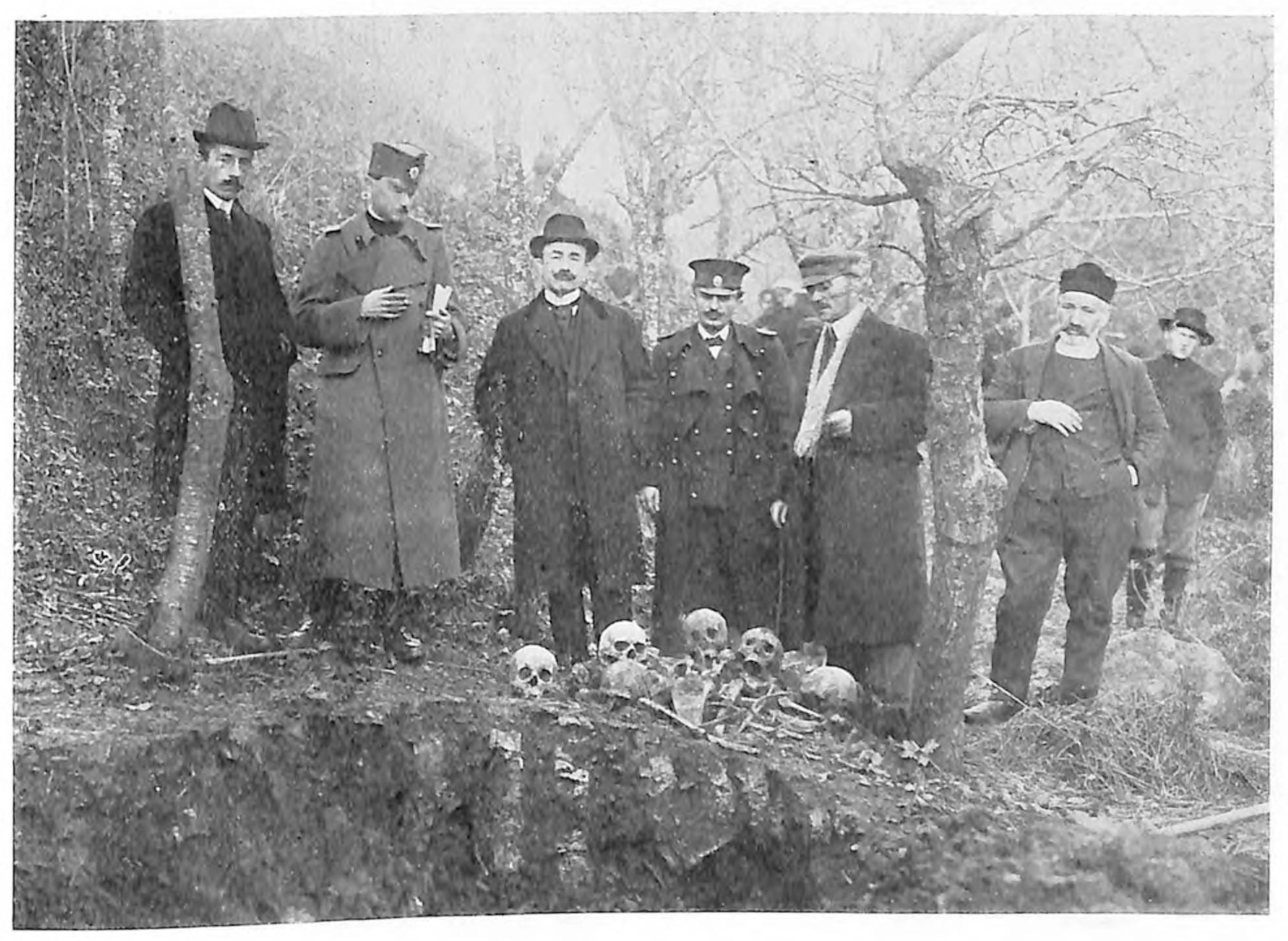
Exhumation of Serbs executed by Bulgarian occupiers in Surdulica between 1916 and 1918.

The Documents relatifs aux violations des Conventions de La Haye et du Droit international, commis de 1915–1918 par les Bulgares en Serbie occupée, a report covering alleged atrocities committed in Serbia, published after the war, stated that ‘anyone unwilling to submit him or herself to the occupiers and become Bulgarian was tortured, raped, interned, and killed in particularly gruesome manners, some of which recorded photographically'. Bulgarian units that occupied Serbian territories showed extreme brutality, systematically expelling the non-Bulgarian population in the regions they occupied, they arrested the population and set the rebel villages on fire.

In addition to the numerous cases of rape, Bulgarian forces encouraged the mixed marriage of Serbian women with Bulgarian men and espoused the view that children born to such marriages should be raised as Bulgarians. Middle-class Serbian functionaries were also suppressed: teachers, religious workers, functionaries, and intellectuals were executed by the Bulgarian soldiers who were following strict instructions to treat civilians the same way they treated soldiers. Additionally, there were regular bombardments of Serbian territories by the aviation and Bulgarian artillery which were operating on the Balkan front around the end of 1916. At the same time, there was a prohibition of Serbian culture; Bulgarians systematically looted Serbian monasteries and the toponymy of villages was changed to Bulgarian.

In addition to those sent to concentration camps, some 30,000 Serbs were sent to Austrian camps or used as forced labour. Factories were plundered of their machinery and a devastating typhus epidemic stalked the land. Thousands died in desperate uprisings, and in some cases, Bulgarian policy was so rigid that it even provoked mutinies among its own soldiers. The Bulgarian soldiers are depicted as simply living off the land without paying any redistribution and also robbing and hitting civilians, whereas the peasants had to work for the occupational authorities without getting any pay, this sometimes included working on defensive positions and carrying ammunition for the Bulgarians which violated the Hague conventions.In ex-Serb Macedonia, for the first time in history, gas chambers were used for the purpose of mass executions, exhaust pipes of trucks were attached to sealed sheds by Bulgarian soldiers where they herded the Serbs whom they wished to eliminate.

== German war crimes ==
=== Bombardment of English coastal towns ===
On 16 December 1914, the Imperial German Navy launched a raid on the British seaport towns of Scarborough, Hartlepool, West Hartlepool, and Whitby. The attack resulted in 137 fatalities and 592 casualties. The raid was in violation of the ninth section of the 1907 Hague Convention which prohibited naval bombardments of undefended towns without warning, because only Hartlepool was protected by shore batteries. Germany was a signatory of the 1907 Hague Convention.

=== Indiscriminate attacks in German-occupied territory ===
In response to actions by Russian prisoners (many of whom tried to sabotage German plans and kill German soldiers), Germany resorted to harsh pacification measures and terror actions, including brutal reprisals against civilians. Before long, similar practices were instituted throughout the Eastern and Western areas of German occupied territory.

==== Destruction of Kalisz, Poland ====
The German army invaded Kalisz on 2 August 1914. The town was burnt down; only churches and public offices survived. A significant number of citizens were shot. Prior to the war, Kalisz had 65,000 inhabitants. Afterwards, it was left with 5,000 inhabitants.

==== Rape of Belgium ====
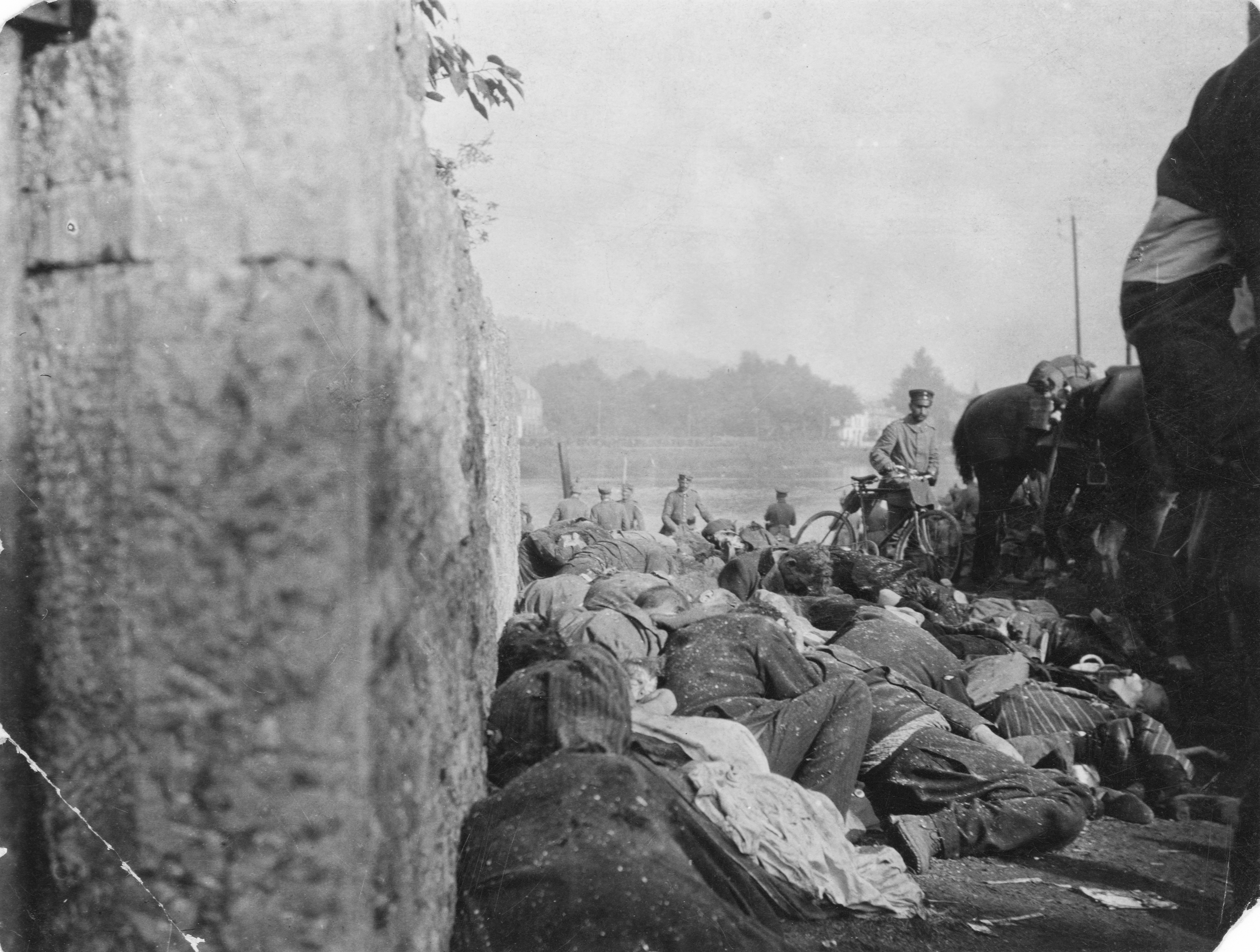
Victims of the 1914 sack of Dinant

The Imperial German Army ignored many of the commonly-understood European conventions of war when between August and October 1914, some 6,500 French and Belgian citizens were murdered, (Note: The German troops were merciless in spite of the international efforts highlighted by the Hague Conventions of 1899 and 1907, which included injunctions codifying and restraining "both the conduct of irregular warfare and the measures to which an occupying power should be entitled in order to combat it".) often in near-random, large-scale shootings ordered by junior German commanders. On some occasions, attacks against German infantry positions and patrols that may have actually been attributable to "friendly fire" were blamed on francs-tireurs (guerrillas), who were regarded as bandits and outside the rules of war, eliciting ruthless measures by German forces against the civilians and villages suspected of harboring them. In addition, they tended to suspect that most civilians were potential francs-tireurs, with German soldiers taking, and sometimes killing, hostages from among the civilian population.

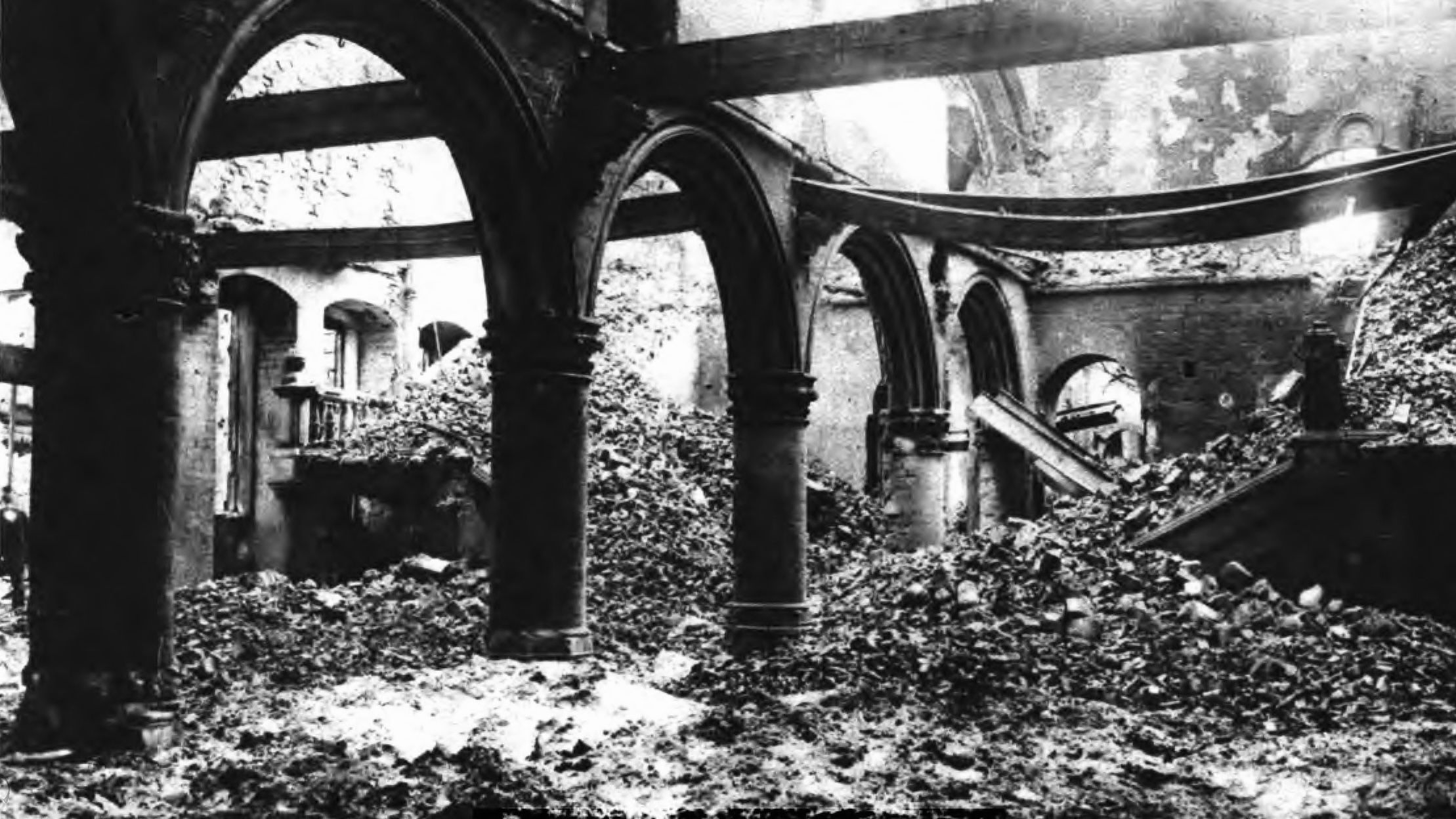
The University Hall library in Leuven in 1915, destroyed following the German occupation.

The Germans treated any resistance in Belgium—such as sabotaging rail lines—as illegal and immoral, and shot the offenders and burned buildings in retaliation. The German Army destroyed 15,000–20,000 buildings—most infamously the university library at Leuven—and generated a wave of refugees, numbering at over a million people. Over half the German regiments in Belgium were involved in major incidents. In destroying the Leuven library, Germany violated its obligation, as a signatory to the 1907 Hague Convention, that "in sieges and bombardment, all necessary steps must be taken to spare, as far as possible, buildings dedicated to religion, art, science, or charitable purposes"; the Treaty of Versailles, one of the treaties that ended the war, included a clause to strengthen the protection of cultural property. Large numbers of cases of rape were also reported.

British propaganda dramatising the Rape of Belgium attracted much attention in the United States, while Berlin said it was both lawful and necessary because of the threat of franc-tireurs like those in France in 1870. The British and French press were mostly factual in their reporting of the atrocities, but wrote about them "in the language of vilification". Thus, as accounts were disseminated at home and in the United States, they played a major role in dissolving support for Germany.

=== German complicity in the Armenian genocide ===
During World War I, Germany was a military ally of the Ottoman Empire, which perpetrated the Armenian genocide. Many Germans present in eastern and southern Anatolia witnessed the genocide, but censorship and self-censorship hampered their reports, while German newspapers reported Ottoman denials of the genocide. Approximately 800 officers and 25,000 soldiers of the Imperial German Army were sent to the Middle Eastern theatre of World War I to fight alongside the Ottoman Army, with German commanders serving in the Ottoman high command and general staff. It is known that individual German military advisors signed some of the orders that led to Ottoman deportations of Armenians, a major component of the genocide, although some authors have highlighted a lack of concrete proof of any German participation in the genocide itself.

=== Unrestricted submarine warfare ===
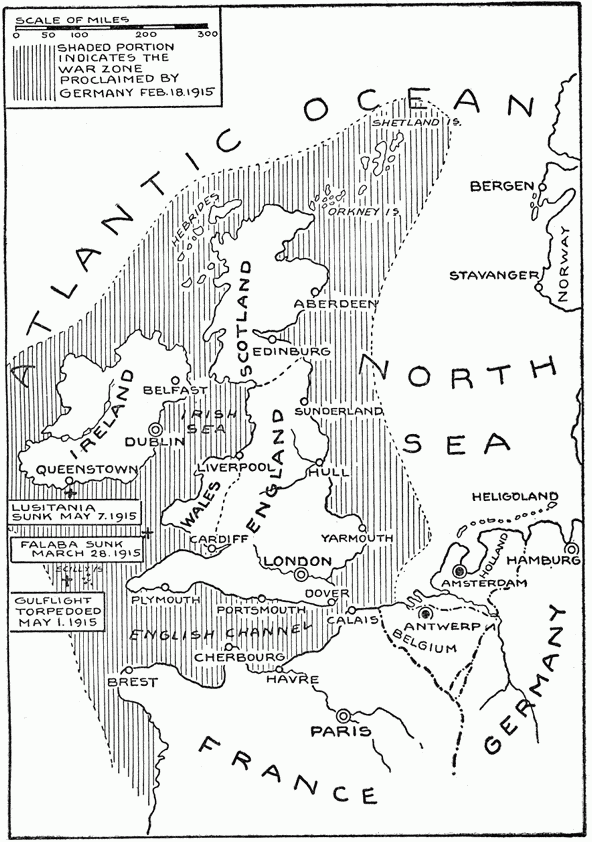
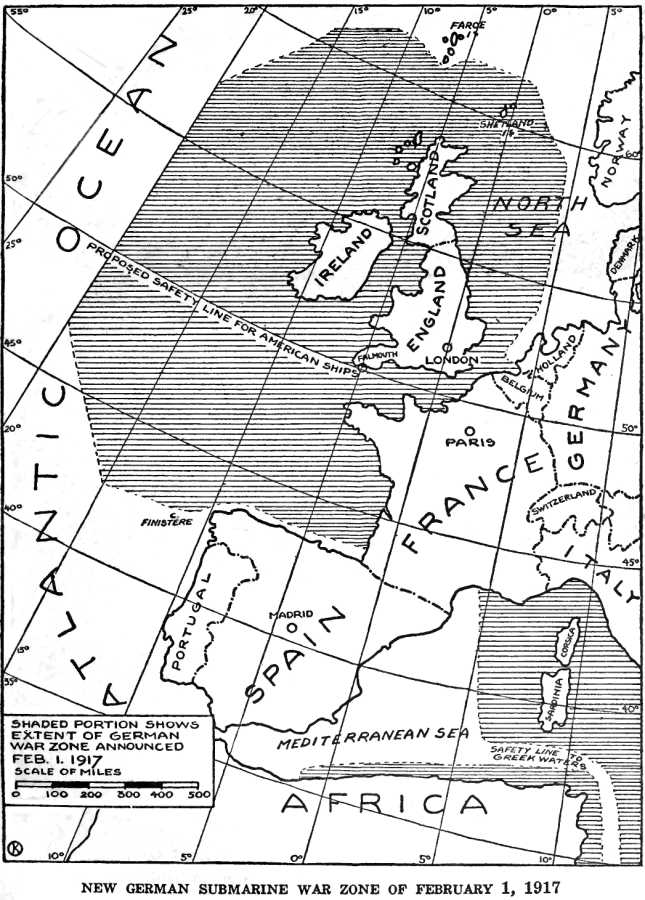
Submarine warfare zones, declared by Germany on February 1915 and February 1917 respectively.

Unrestricted submarine warfare was instituted in 1915 in response to the British naval blockade of Germany. Germany intended to starve Britain as well, but unlike the British, prize rules, which were codified under the 1907 Hague Convention—such as those that required commerce raiders to warn their targets and allow time for the crew to board lifeboats—were disregarded and commercial vessels were sunk regardless of nationality, cargo, or destination. Following the sinking of the RMS Lusitania on 7 May 1915 and subsequent public outcry in various neutral countries, including the United States, the practice was withdrawn. However, Germany resumed the practice on 1 February 1917 and declared that all merchant ships regardless of nationalities would be sunk without warning. This outraged the U.S. public, prompting the U.S. to break diplomatic relations with Germany two days later, and, along with the Zimmermann Telegram, led the U.S. entry into the war two months later on the side of the Allied Powers. Around 15,000 British civilian sailors were killed in the submarine campaign, with a smaller number from other states.

While the German attempt at a blockade was much less successful in terms of inflicting civilian suffering, during the war and prior to World War II, Germany's actions were widely considered to be a greater war crime, and are technically still illegal today.

=== Sinking of hospital ships ===
During the First World War, many hospital ships were attacked, sometimes deliberately and sometimes as a result of mistaken identity. They were sunk by either torpedo, mine or surface attack. They were easy targets, since they carried hundreds of wounded soldiers from the front lines.

==== Torpedoing of HMHS Llandovery Castle ====
The Canadian hospital ship HMHS Llandovery Castle was torpedoed by the German submarine SM U-86 on 27 June 1918 in violation of international law. Only 24 of the 258 medical personnel, patients, and crew survived. Survivors reported that the U-boat surfaced and ran down the lifeboats, machine-gunning survivors in the water. The U-boat captain, Helmut Brümmer-Patzig, was charged with war crimes in Germany following the war, but escaped prosecution by going to the Free City of Danzig, beyond the jurisdiction of German courts.

== Japanese war crimes ==
During the march towards the German port in Tsingtao and the siege that followed, Japanese forces killed 98 Chinese civilians and wounded 30; there were also countless incidents of war rape against Chinese women committed by Japanese soldiers.

== Ottoman war crimes ==
=== Genocide and ethnic cleansing ===
==== Armenian genocide ====
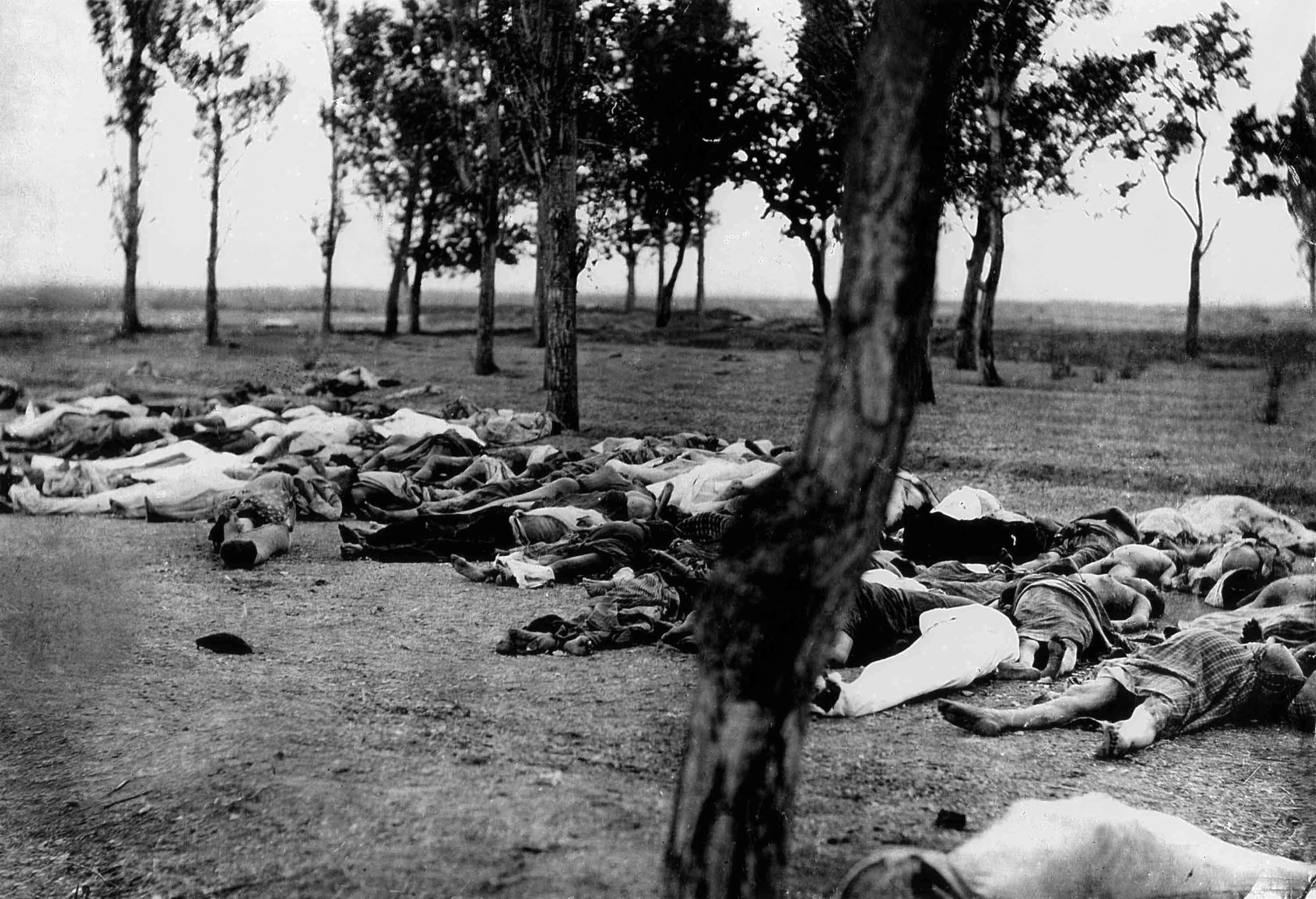
Armenians killed during the Armenian genocide. Image taken from Ambassador Morgenthau's Story, written by Henry Morgenthau Sr. and published in 1918.

In the final years of the Ottoman Empire's existence, the Committee of Union and Progress (CUP) committed a genocide against the empire's Armenian population. The Ottomans carried out organised, systematic massacres and deportations of Armenians throughout the war, and they portrayed acts of resistance by Armenians as rebellions in an attempt to justify their extermination campaign. In early 1915, a number of Armenians volunteered to join the Russian forces, and the Ottoman government used this as a pretext to issue the Tehcir Law (Law on Deportation), which authorised the deportation of Armenians from the Empire's eastern provinces to Syria between 1915 and 1918. The Armenians were intentionally marched to death, and a large number of them were attacked by Ottoman brigands. While the exact number of deaths is unknown, the International Association of Genocide Scholars estimates that 1.5 million Armenians were killed. The government of Turkey has consistently denied the genocide, arguing that those who died were victims of inter-ethnic fighting, famine, or disease during World War I; these claims are rejected by most historians. Other ethnic groups were also attacked by the Ottoman Empire during this period, including Assyrians and Greeks, and some scholars consider those events different parts of the same policy of extermination.

==== Greek genocide ====
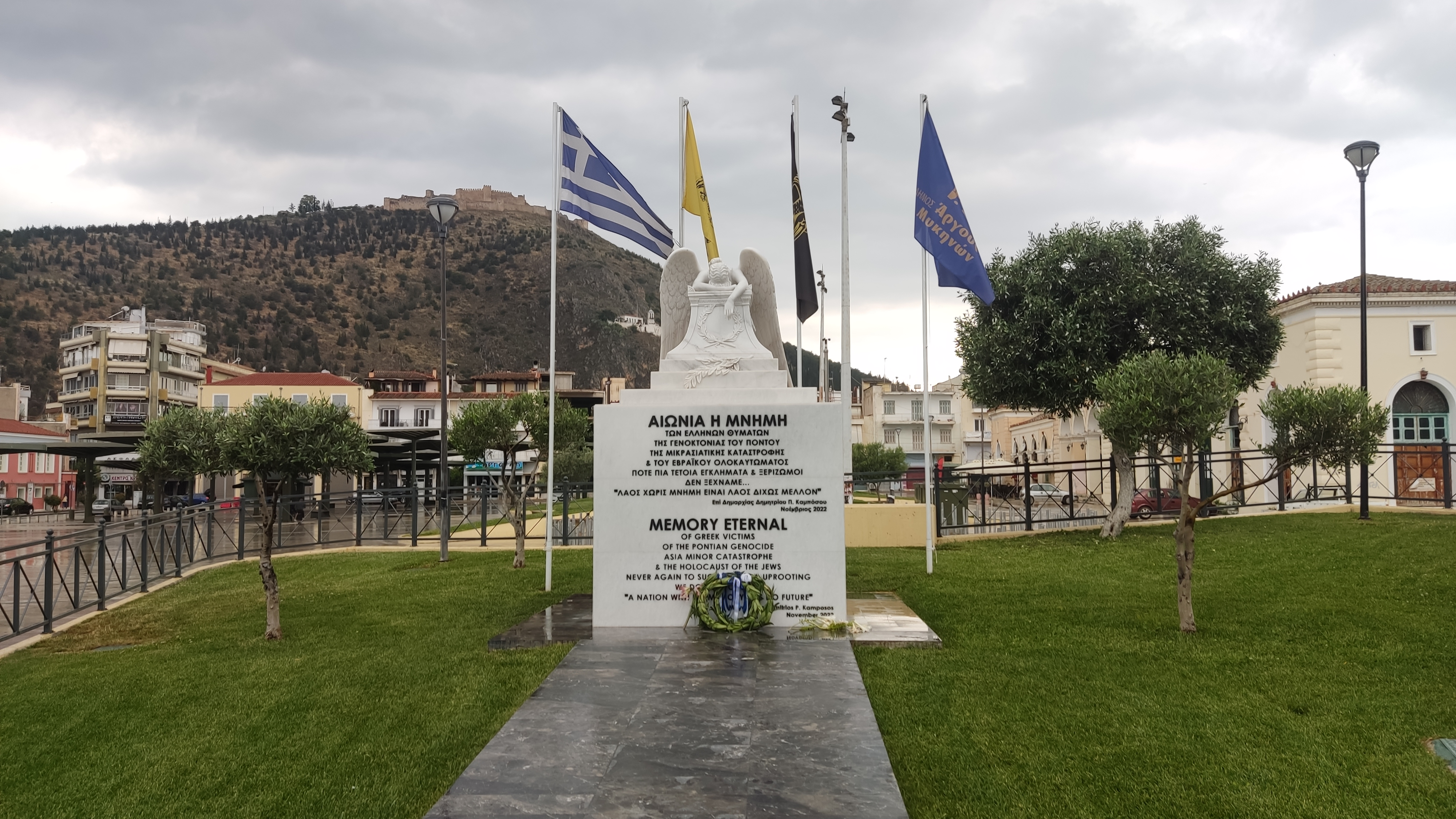
Monument in Argos, Greece for the Greek genocide and the Holocaust.

Genocidal policies against Ottoman Greeks were already put in place by the CUP prior to World War I, and continued after the war began. According to a newspaper of the time, in November 1914, Turkish troops destroyed Christian properties and killed several Christians at Trabzon. The CUP officially sanctioned the forceful migration of Greeks into the Anatolian hinterland. In the fall of 1916, with Allied forces advancing towards Anatolia, and Greece being expected to enter the war on the side of the Allies, preparations were made for the deportation of Greeks living in border areas. As such, in March 1917 the population of Ayvalık, a town of c. 30,000 inhabitants on the Aegean coast, was forcibly deported to the interior of Anatolia under the orders of German General Liman von Sanders. The operation included death marches, looting, torture and massacres against the civilian population. between 1914 and 1922, and for the whole of Anatolia, there are academic estimates of a death toll ranging from 300,000 to 750,000.

==== Assyrian genocide ====
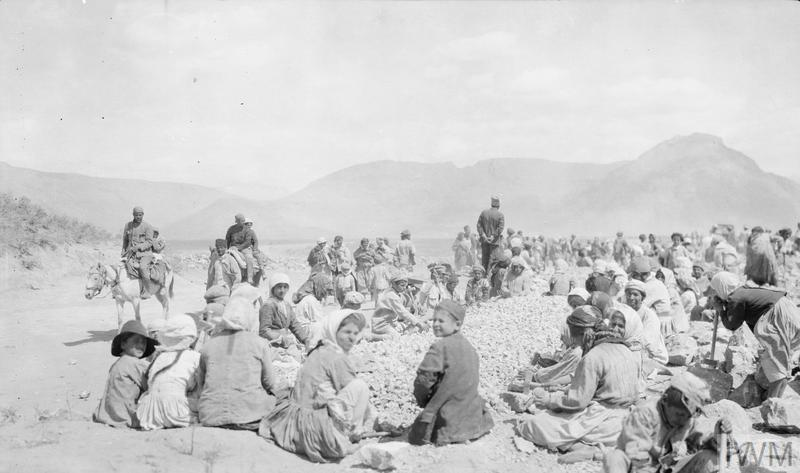
Orphaned Assyrian refugees in Qajar Iran, 1918

Happening contemporaneously was the Sayfo, a genocide of Assyrian people. In mid-1915, interior minister Talaat Pasha ordered for an ethnic cleansing campaign against the Assyrians of Hakkari, and Ottoman forces proceeded to loot Assyrian villages there and destroy cultural artifacts, taking no prisoners as they did so. Many Assyrians fled to Iran, but after the Ottomans began occupying parts of Iran, Djevdet Bey ordered massacres of Christian civilians to prevent them from joining to fight for Russia. Between February and May (when the Ottoman forces pulled out), there was a campaign of mass execution, looting, kidnapping, and extortion against Christians in Urmia, and Assyrian women were targeted for kidnapping and rape; seventy villages were destroyed. Halil Kut and Djevdet Bey ordered the murder of Armenian and Syriac soldiers serving in the Ottoman army, and several hundred were killed. By 1923, the genocide killed an estimated 250,000 to 275,000 Assyrian Christians (about half of the population).

==== Deportations of Kurds ====
A policy of deporting Ottoman Kurds from their indigenous lands also began during World War I, under the orders of Talaat Pasha. Although many Kurds were loyal to the empire (with some even supporting the persecution of Christian minorities by the CUP), Turkish authorities nevertheless feared the possibility that they would collaborate with Armenians and Russians to establish their own Kurdish state. In 1916, roughly 300,000 Kurds were deported from Bitlis, Erzurum, Palu and Muş to Konya and Gaziantep during the winter, and most died from famine.

==== Deportations in Ottoman Palestine ====
In December 1915, the Ottoman's expelled roughly 6,000 Jews with Russian citizenship in Jaffa to Egypt. As British forces advanced towards Palestine in 1917, Ottoman authorities began deporting and expelling people throughout Palestine, targeting Jews in particular. In March 1917, everyone living in Gaza (at the time, a town of 35,000–40,000 people, mostly Arabs) was expelled, and the population would not recover until the 1940s. That same month – on the orders of Djemal Pasha – tens of thousands of people were deported from Jaffa, an action that was accompanied by severe violence, starvation, theft, persecution and abuse. When New Zealand troops arrived to Jaffa in November 1917, only 8,000 of the original population of 40,000 remained.

=== Ottoman mistreatment of prisoners of war ===
The Ottoman Empire often treated POWs poorly. Some 11,800 British Empire soldiers, most of them Indians, became prisoners after the siege of Kut in Mesopotamia in April 1916; 4,250 died in captivity. Although many were in a poor condition when captured, Ottoman officers forced them to march 1,100 kilometres (684 mi) to Anatolia. A survivor said: "We were driven along like beasts; to drop out was to die."

== Russian war crimes ==
=== Pogroms and ethnic cleansing ===
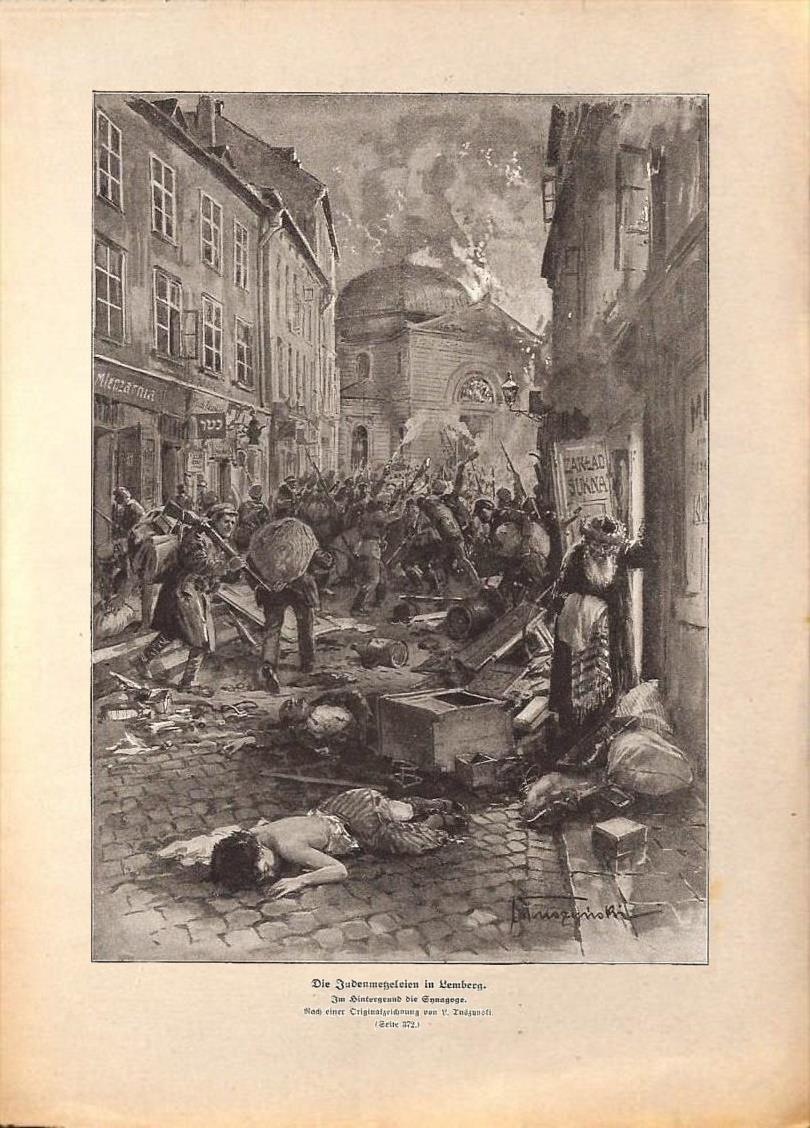
Depiction of the Lwów pogrom (1914), perpetrated by Imperial Russian forces.

During the war, Russian authorities organized pogroms against German populations in Russian cities, massacred Jews in their towns and shtetls, and deported 500,000 Jews and 250,000 Germans into the Russian interior. In March 1915, after the Austro-Hungarian Army surrendered Przemyśl to the Imperial Russian Army following a siege of the city fortress, Tsarist troops celebrated by launching a pogrom against the city's whole Jewish population. On 11 June 1915, a pogrom also began against ethnic Germans in Petrograd, with over 500 factories, stores and offices looted and mob violence unleashed against Germans. After the Great Retreat of the Russian army, the Chief of the General Staff Nikolai Yanushkevich, with the full support of the Grand Duke Nicholas, ordered the army to devastate the border territories and expel the "enemy" nations within, meaning both Jews and ethnic Germans, to internal exile in Siberia.

Many pogroms also accompanied the Russian Revolution of 1917 and the ensuing Russian Civil War. 50,000–250,000 civilian Jews were killed in atrocities throughout the former Russian Empire (mostly within the Pale of Settlement in present-day Ukraine). There were an estimated 7–12 million casualties during the Russian Civil War, mostly civilians.

=== Deportations from East Prussia ===
In 1914–1915, the Russian Empire forcibly deported local inhabitants from Russian-occupied areas of East Prussia to more remote areas of the empire, particularly Siberia. The official rationale was to reduce espionage and other resistance behind the Russian front lines. As many as 13,600 people, including children and the elderly, were deported. Due to difficult living conditions, the mortality rates were high, and only 8,300 people returned home after the war.

== War crimes by both Allied and Central Powers ==
=== Use of chemical weapons ===
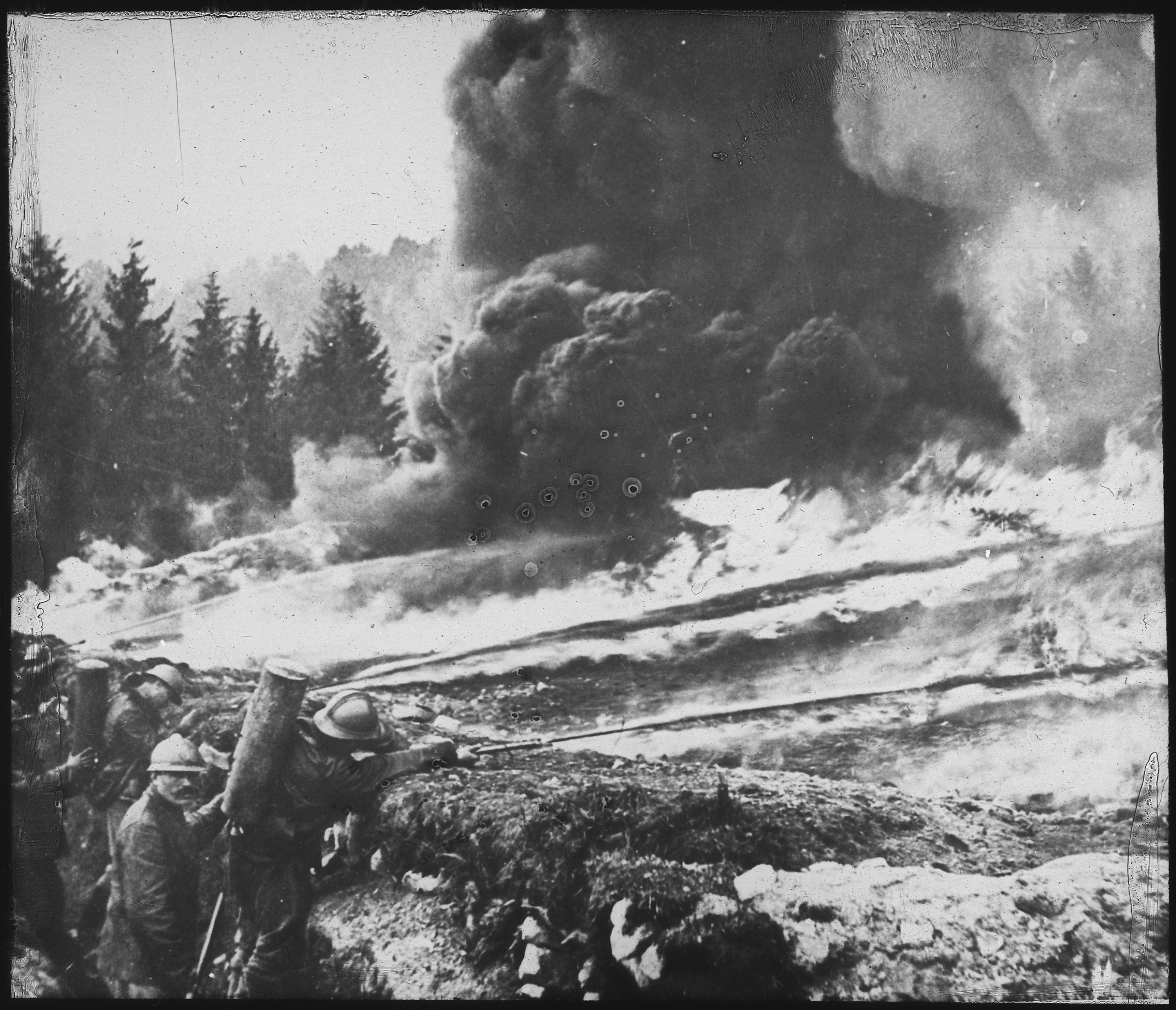
French soldiers making a gas and flame attack on German trenches in Flanders

The use of chemical weapons in warfare was in direct violation of the 1899 Hague Declaration Concerning Asphyxiating Gases and the 1907 Hague Convention on Land Warfare, which prohibited their use and which all major combatants had signed. Even so, the German army was the first to successfully deploy chemical weapons during the Second Battle of Ypres (22 April – 25 May 1915), after German scientists working under the direction of Fritz Haber at the Kaiser Wilhelm Institute developed a method to weaponize chlorine. (Note: A German attempt to use chemical weapons on the Russian front in January 1915 failed to cause casualties.) The use of chemical weapons was sanctioned by the German High Command in an effort to force Allied soldiers out of their entrenched positions, complementing rather than supplanting more lethal conventional weapons. The British Army first deployed chemical weapons, namely chlorine gas, at the Battle of Loos, which proved not only unsuccessful, but resulted in one of the most disastrous friendly fire incidents of the Great War, as the wind blew the gas right back into Allied lines.

In time, chemical weapons were deployed by all major belligerents throughout the war, inflicting approximately 500k-1.3 million casualties, but relatively few fatalities: About 26–90,000 in total. For example, there were an estimated 186,000 British chemical weapons casualties during the war (80% of which were the result of exposure to the vesicant sulfur mustard, introduced to the battlefield by the Germans in July 1917, which burns the skin at any point of contact and inflicts more severe lung damage than chlorine or phosgene), and up to one-third of American casualties were caused by them. The Imperial Russian Army reportedly suffered roughly 500,000 chemical weapon casualties in World War I. Civilians were not deliberately targeted but nearby towns were at risk from winds blowing the poison gases through. Only the French took precautions to avoid such collateral damage. Initially, civilians rarely had a warning system or access to effective gas masks, but this improved later in the war. Official Allied numbers of civilian casualties of German attacks are around 1300, a likely underestimate. The number of civilian casualties of Allied gas attacks is not known. There were also thousands of injuries in weapons production facilities.

The war damaged the prestige of chemistry in European societies, especially the German variety.

=== Massacres of Albanians ===
During the Balkan Wars, Albanians were massacred by members of the Balkan League, mostly by Serbian and Montenegrin Chetnik forces. These massacres continued during the First World War as foreign armies entered Albania. Bulgarian, Serbian, Montenegrin, and Greek forces committed several atrocities in Albania, during occupation, and in other regions inhabited by Albanians. Many villages were burned and destroyed, leaving 330,000 people without homes by 1915. According to the Committee of Kosovo, 50,000 Albanians were killed by Central Powers affiliated Bulgarian forces and around 200,000 Albanians were killed by Allied affiliated Serbian and Montenegrin forces.

== Impacts on international law ==
=== Crimes against humanity and genocide as international crimes ===
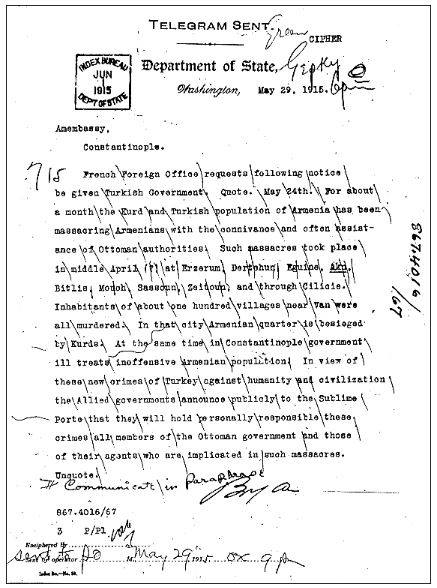
Version of the declaration forwarded to the Ottoman Empire by the U.S. State Department.

On 24 May 1915, on the initiative of Russia, the Triple Entente—Russia, France, and the United Kingdom—issued a declaration condemning the Ottomans for committing "crimes […] against humanity and civilization" against the Armenians, threatening to hold the perpetrators accountable. Although the phrase "crimes against humanity" had been used prior to this, it was the first time the phrase was used in the context of international diplomacy, and it later became a category of international criminal law after World War II.

Polish-Jewish lawyer Raphael Lemkin, who coined the term genocide in 1944, became interested in the prosecution of war crimes after reading about the 1921 trial of Soghomon Tehlirian for the assassination of Talaat Pasha. Lemkin recognized the fate of the Armenians as one of the most significant genocides in the twentieth century.

=== Establishment of the Geneva Protocol ===
The Geneva Protocol, signed by 132 nations on 17 June 1925, was a treaty established to ban the use of chemical and biological weapons during wartime. As stated by Coupland and Leins, "it was fostered in part by a 1918 appeal in which the International Committee of the Red Cross (ICRC) described the use of poisonous gas against soldiers as a barbarous invention which science is bringing to perfection". The Protocol required that all remaining stockpiles of chemical weapons be destroyed. Chemical warfare agents that contained bromine, nitroaromatic, and chlorine were dismantled and destroyed. The destruction and disposal of the chemicals did not consider the long-term and adverse impacts on the environment. Although the Geneva Protocol banned the use of chemical weapons during wartime, the Protocol did not ban the production of chemical weapons. In fact, since the Geneva Protocol, the stockpiling of chemical weapons has continued, and weapons have become more lethal. As a result, the Chemical Weapons Convention (CWC) was drafted in 1993, which prohibits the development, production, stockpiling, and use of chemical weapons. Despite there being an international ban on chemical warfare, the CWC "allows domestic law enforcement agencies of the signing countries to use chemical weapons on their citizens".

== See also ==
- List of war crimes § 1914–1918: World War I
- War crimes in World War II
- Russian occupation of Eastern Galicia (1914–1915)
