= Internment of Ukrainian Canadians =

Mass incarceration in Canada during World War I

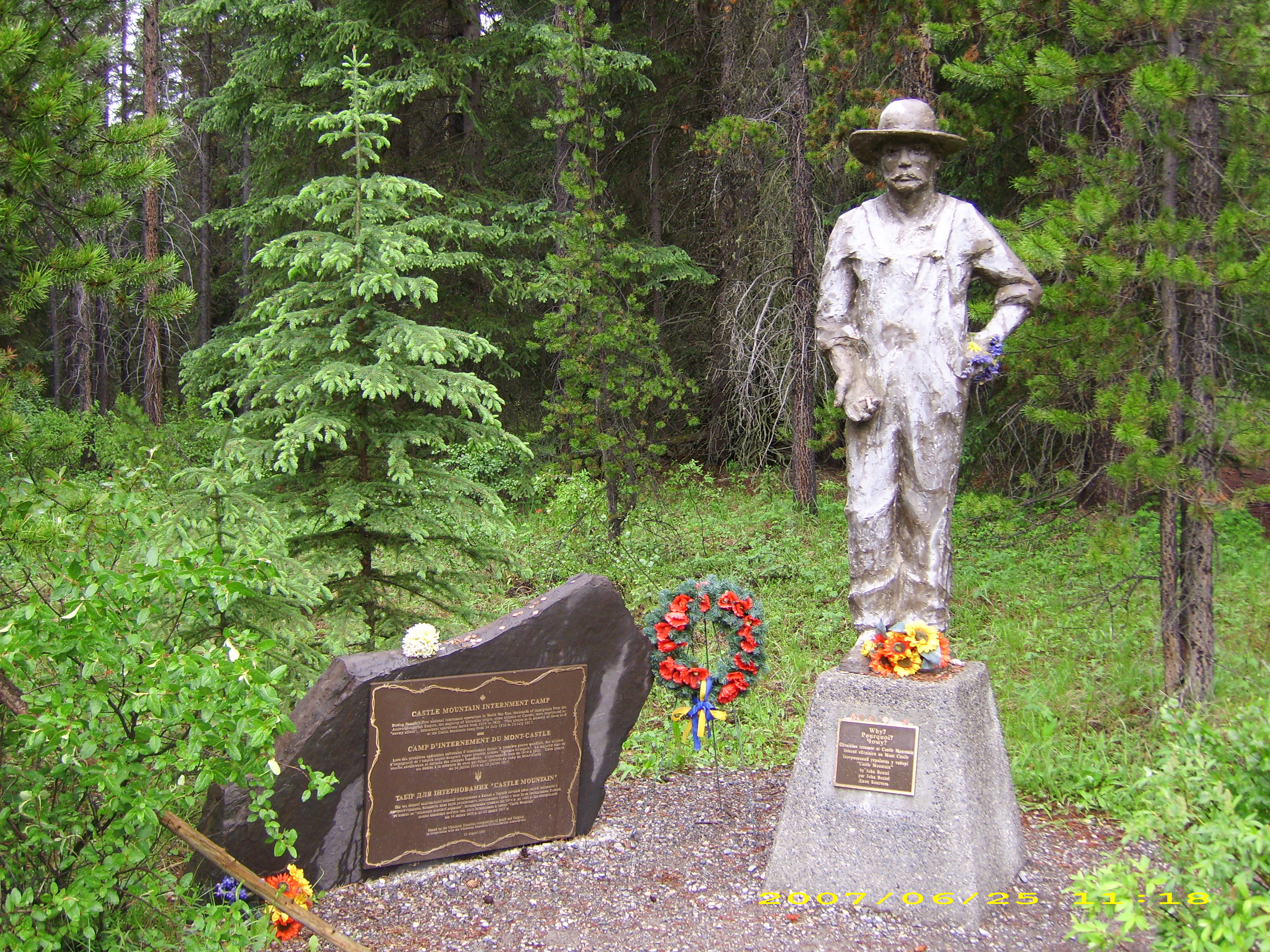
Commemorative plaque and a statue entitled "Why?" / "Pourquoi?" / "Чому (Chomu)?", by John Boxtel at the location of the Castle Mountain Internment Camp, Banff National Park

The internment of Ukrainian Canadians was part of the confinement of enemy aliens in Canada during and for two years after the end of the First World War. It lasted from 1914 to 1920, under the terms of the War Measures Act.

Canada was at war with Austria-Hungary. Along with Austro-Hungarian prisoners of war, about 8,000 Ukrainian men, women, and children – those Ukrainians of Austro-Hungarian citizenship as well as naturalized British subjects of Ukrainian descent – were kept in twenty-four internment camps and related work sites (also known, at the time, as concentration camps). Their savings were confiscated and many had land taken while imprisoned as the land was abandoned. Some were "paroled" from camps in 1916–17, many were put to work as unpaid workers on farms, mines, and railways, where labour was scarce. Much existing Canadian infrastructure from 1916 to 1917 was built by this unpaid labour.

Another 80,000 were not imprisoned but were registered as enemy aliens and obliged to regularly report to the police and were required to carry identifying documents at all times or suffer punitive consequences.

The embarrassment and trauma of internment caused many Ukrainians to change their family names, hide their imprisonment and abandon traditions due to fear of negative repercussions – causing PTSD and intergenerational trauma. In addition, some maintain that the Government of Canada approved key records to be destroyed in the 1950s, leaving documentation to be based on individual family records and pleas to the local communities where the camps were located.

== Internment ==
During the First World War, a growing sentiment against enemy aliens had manifested itself amongst Canadians. The British government urged Canada not to act indiscriminately against subject nationalities of Austria-Hungary who were in fact friendly to the British Empire. However, Ottawa took a hard line. These enemy-born citizens were treated as social pariahs, and many lost their employment. Under the 1914 War Measures Act, "aliens of enemy nationality" were compelled to register with authorities. About 70,000 Ukrainians from Austria-Hungary fell under this description. 8,579 males and some women and children were interned by the Government of Canada, including 5,954 Austro-Hungarians, most of whom were probably ethnic Ukrainians. Most of the 8,600 people interned were young men apprehended while trying to cross the border into the United States to look for jobs; attempting to leave Canada was illegal. Most of the interned were poor or unemployed single men, although 81 women and 156 children (mainly Germans in Vernon and Ukrainians at Spirit Lake) had no choice but to accompany the men to two of the camps, in Spirit Lake, near Amos, Quebec, and Vernon, British Columbia. Some of the internees were Canadian-born and others were naturalized British subjects, although most were recent immigrants. Citizens of the Russian Empire were generally not interned.

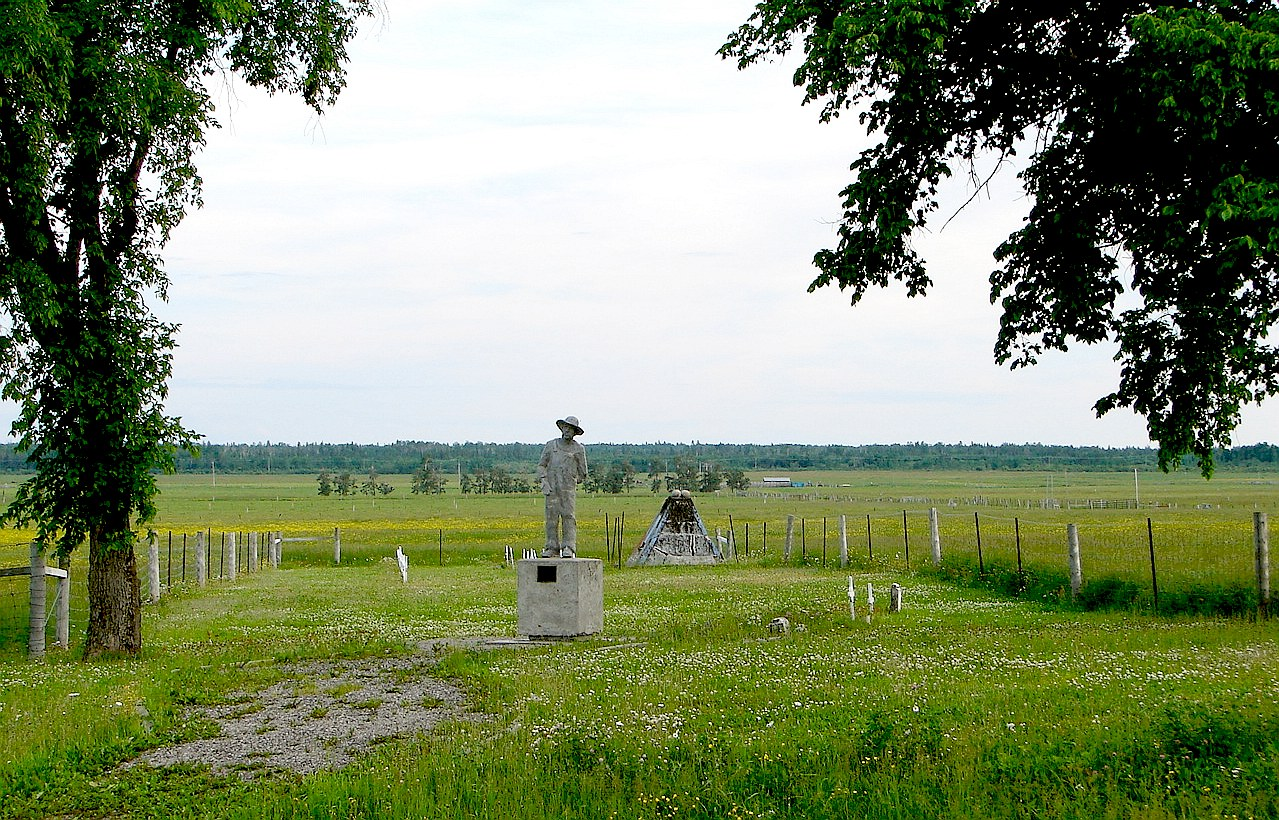
Commemorative statue entitled "Never Forget" / "Ne jamais oublier" / "Ніколи не забути (Nikoly ne zabuty)", by John Boxtel, and damaged plaque at the cemetery of the Kapuskasing Internment Camp; Kapuskasing, northern Ontario

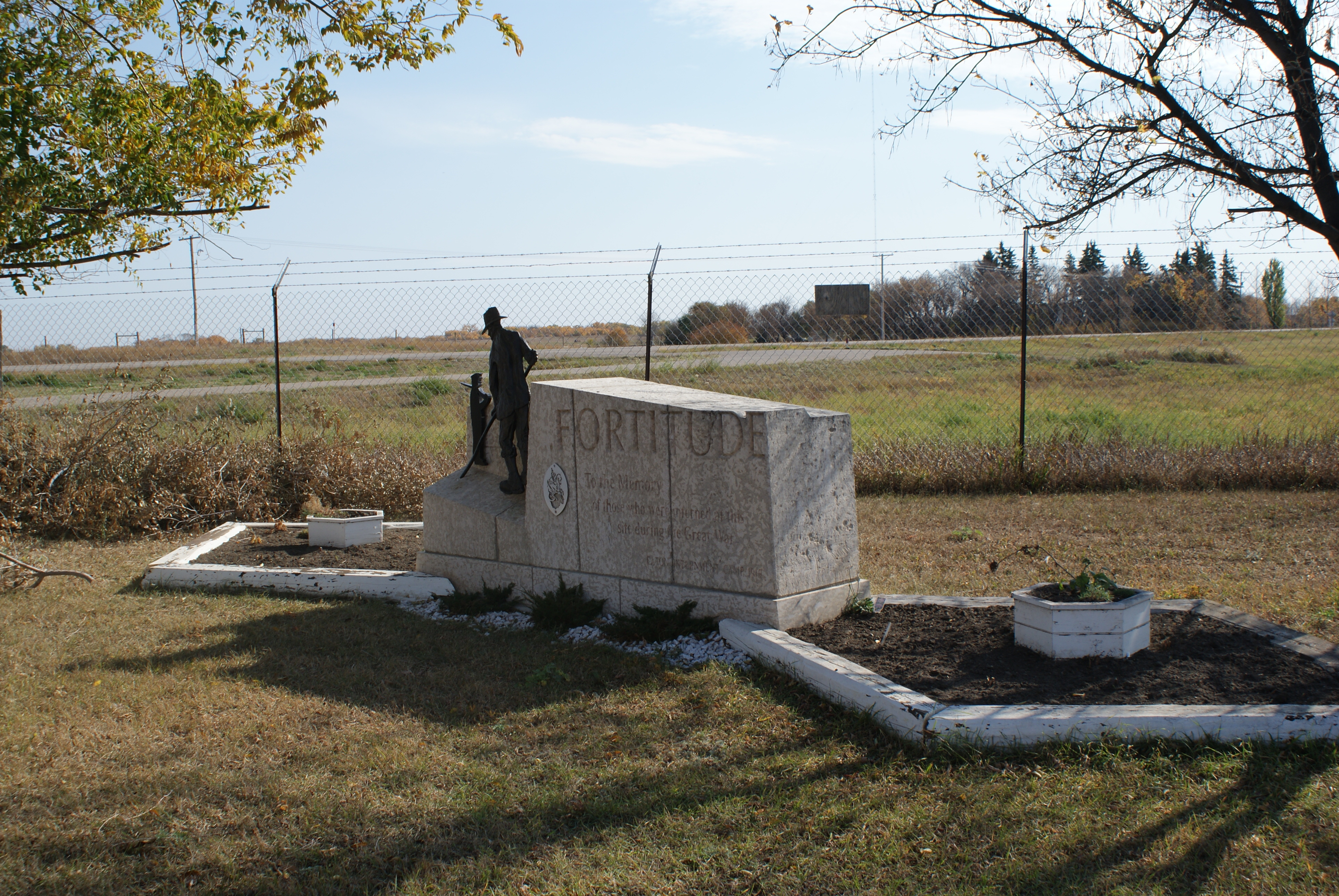
Commemorative stone at the Saskatchewan Railway Museum, formerly "Eaton Siding" near the Eaton Internment Camp, one of twenty-four, where 8,579 civilians were interned. It reads "Fortitude. To the memory of those who were interned at this site during the Great War. Eaton Internment Camp 1919."

Many of these internees were used for forced labour in internment camps.

There was a severe shortage of farm labour, so in 1916–17 nearly all of the internees were "paroled". Many parolees went to the custody of local farmers. They were paid at current wage rates, usually 20 cents per hour, with fifty cents a day deducted for room and board. Other parolees were sent as paid workers to railway gangs and mines. The internees turned over all their cash to authorities – $329,000 in total, of which $298,000 was returned to them on release.

=== Camps ===
Conditions at the camps varied, and the Castle Mountain Internment Camp – where labour contributed to the creation of Banff National Park – was considered exceptionally harsh and abusive. The internment continued for two more years after the war had ended, although most Ukrainians were paroled into jobs for private companies by 1917. Even as parolees, they were still required to report regularly to the police authorities. Federal and provincial governments and private concerns benefited from the internees' labour and from the confiscation of what little wealth they had, a portion of which was left in the Bank of Canada at the end of the internment operations on June 20, 1920. A small number of internees, including men considered to be "dangerous foreigners", labour radicals, or particularly troublesome internees, were deported to Europe after the war, largely from the Kapuskasing camp, which was the last to be shut down.

Of those interned, 109 died of various diseases and injuries sustained in the camp, six were killed while trying to escape, and some – according to Major-General Sir William Dillon Otter's final report – went insane or committed suicide as a result of their confinement.

A list of the camps follows:

Location	Date of opening	Date of closing	Description
Montreal, Quebec	August 13, 1914	November 30, 1918	Immigration Hall
Kingston, Ontario	August 18, 1914	November 3, 1917	Fort Henry
Winnipeg, Manitoba	September 1, 1914	July 20, 1916	Fort Osborne Barracks
Halifax, Nova Scotia	September 8, 1914	October 3, 1918	The Citadel
Vernon, British Columbia	September 18, 1914	February 20, 1920	Provincial Government Building
Nanaimo, British Columbia	September 20, 1914	September 17, 1915	Provincial Government Building
Brandon, Manitoba	September 22, 1914	July 29, 1916	Exhibition Building
Lethbridge, Alberta	September 30, 1914	November 7, 1916	Exhibition Building
Petawawa, Ontario	December 10, 1914	May 8, 1916	Militia Camp / Tents
Toronto, Ontario	December 14, 1914	October 2, 1916	Stanley Barracks
Kapuskasing, Ontario	December 14, 1914	February 24, 1920	Bunk Houses
Niagara Falls, Ontario	December 15, 1915	August 31, 1918	The Armoury
Beauport, Quebec	December 28, 1914	June 22, 1916	The Armoury
Spirit Lake, Quebec	January 13, 1915	January 28, 1917	Bunk Houses
Sault Ste. Marie, Ontario	January 13, 1915	January 29, 1918	The Armoury
Amherst, Nova Scotia	April 17, 1915	September 27, 1919	Malleable Iron Works
Monashee–Mara Lake, British Columbia	June 2, 1915	July 29, 1917	Tents & Bunk Houses
Fernie–Morrissey, British Columbia	June 9, 1915	October 21, 1918	Rented Premises
Banff–Castle Mountain and Cave & Basin, Alberta	July 14, 1915	July 15, 1917	Dominion Park Building at Cave & Basin, Tents at Castle Mountain
Edgewood, British Columbia	August 19, 1915	September 23, 1916	Bunk Houses
Revelstoke–Field–Otter, British Columbia	September 6, 1915	October 23, 1916	Bunk Houses
Jasper, Alberta	February 8, 1916	August 31, 1916	Dominion Parks Buildings
Munson, Alberta– Eaton, Saskatchewan	October 13, 1918	March 21, 1919	Railway Cars
Valcartier, Quebec	April 24, 1915	October 23, 1915	Militia Camp / Tents

== Legacy ==
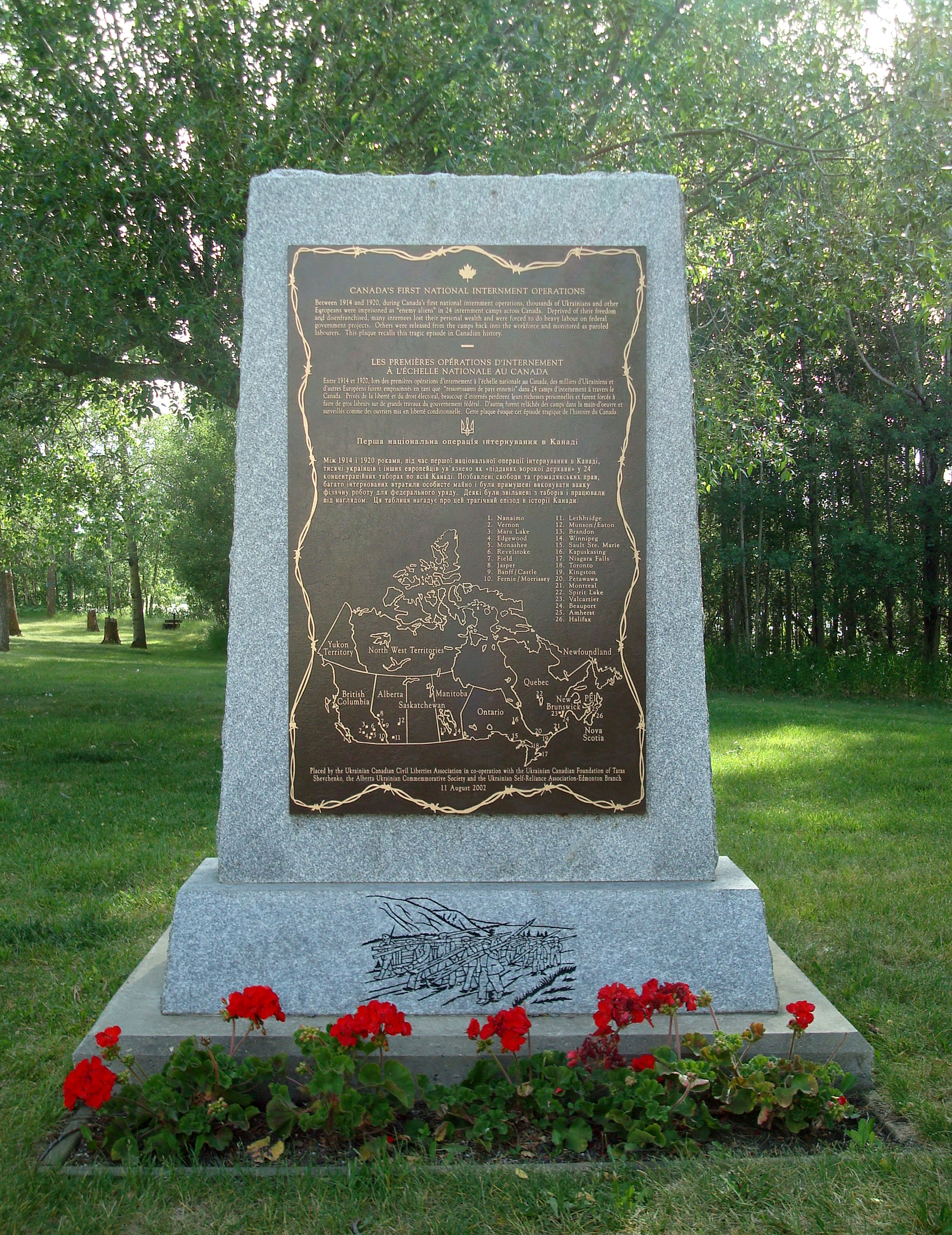
Memorial at the Ukrainian Cultural Heritage Village, east of Edmonton, Alberta. Includes a map showing the locations of the internment camps across Canada. Dedicated on August 11, 2002.

Since 1985, the organized Ukrainian-Canadian community has sought official acknowledgment for this World War I internment, conducting a campaign that underscored the moral, legal and political obligation to redress the historical wrong. The campaign, spearheaded by the Ukrainian Canadian Civil Liberties Association (UCCLA), included the memorialization of places of internment as historic sites. Currently there are twenty plaques and memorials across Canada commemorating the internment, including two at the locations of former concentration camps in Banff National Park. These have been placed by the UCCLA and its supporters.

In 1994, Yurij Luhovy and the National Film Board of Canada released a feature-length documentary about the internment operations entitled Freedom Had a Price. While researching for and shooting the film, Luhovy discovered never before seen pictures of the camps and donated them to the National Archives of Canada.

On November 25, 2005, the Senate of Canada voted unanimously to pass Bill C-331, the Internment of Persons of Ukrainian Origin Recognition Act, closely following the vote of the House of Commons on November 23, 2005, and it received royal assent. This act acknowledges that persons of Ukrainian origin were interned in Canada during the First World War and legally obliges the Government of Canada to negotiate "an agreement concerning measures that may be taken to recognize the internment" for educational and commemorative projects.

Thought to be the last known survivor of the internment measures, Mary Manko Haskett was only a child of 6 when she was interned with her family at Spirit Lake. She died in July 2007. In 2007 another survivor – Mary Hancharuk, born in the Spirit Lake camp – was found; then aged 92, making her the last known survivor of the internment operations. She died in 2008.

== Canadian First World War Internment Recognition Fund ==
The Ukrainian Canadian campaign for acknowledgement and redress was spearheaded by members of the UCCLA from the mid-1980s (at that time within the Ukrainian Canadian Congress). On May 9, 2008, the Government of Canada established a $10 million fund. The Endowment Council of the Canadian First World War Internment Recognition Fund (CFWWIRF) uses the interest earned on that amount to fund projects that commemorate the experience of thousands of Ukrainians and other Europeans interned between 1914 and 1920 and the many others who suffered a suspension of their civil liberties and freedoms. The funds are themselves held in trust by the Ukrainian Canadian Foundation of Taras Shevchenko.

On September 12, 2009, the CFWWIRF was announced formally with a notice published in The Globe and Mail describing how individuals or groups can apply for funding for commemorative, educational and cultural activities recalling Canada's first national internment operations.

One of the first projects funded by the CFWWIRF was the documentary Jajo's Secret directed by James Motluk and broadcast on Omni Television in 2009. This film tells the story of Motluk's discovery of a parole certificate issued to his late grandfather, Elias, in 1918. More recently the CFWWIRF supported two additional films, The Camps and That Never Happened, by Ryan Boyko, as well as the preparation of lesson plans and other educational materials suitable for teachers across Canada (available for free on the website of the CFWWIRF).

The Kingston Symposium of the CFWWIRF's Endowment Council was held in Kingston, Ontario on June 17–20, 2010, bringing together community activists, descendants, academics and artists to discuss ways and means for commemorating Canada's first national internment operations.

Construction of the Spirit Lake Camp Interpretive Centre was launched in July 2010 and on November 26, 2011, opened officially in a ceremony attended by the Honourable Jason Kenney, then Minister of Citizenship and Immigration, who referred to the internment operations as "a blight" on Canadian history. The CFWWIRF's Endowment Council made the funding of this interpretive centre one of its top granting priorities, budgeting $400,000 over five years for this project. A permanent exhibit on Canada's first national internment operations was opened at the Cave and Basin National Historic Site in Banff National Park in September 2013 by Kenney, then Minister of Employment and Social Development and Minister for Multiculturalism.

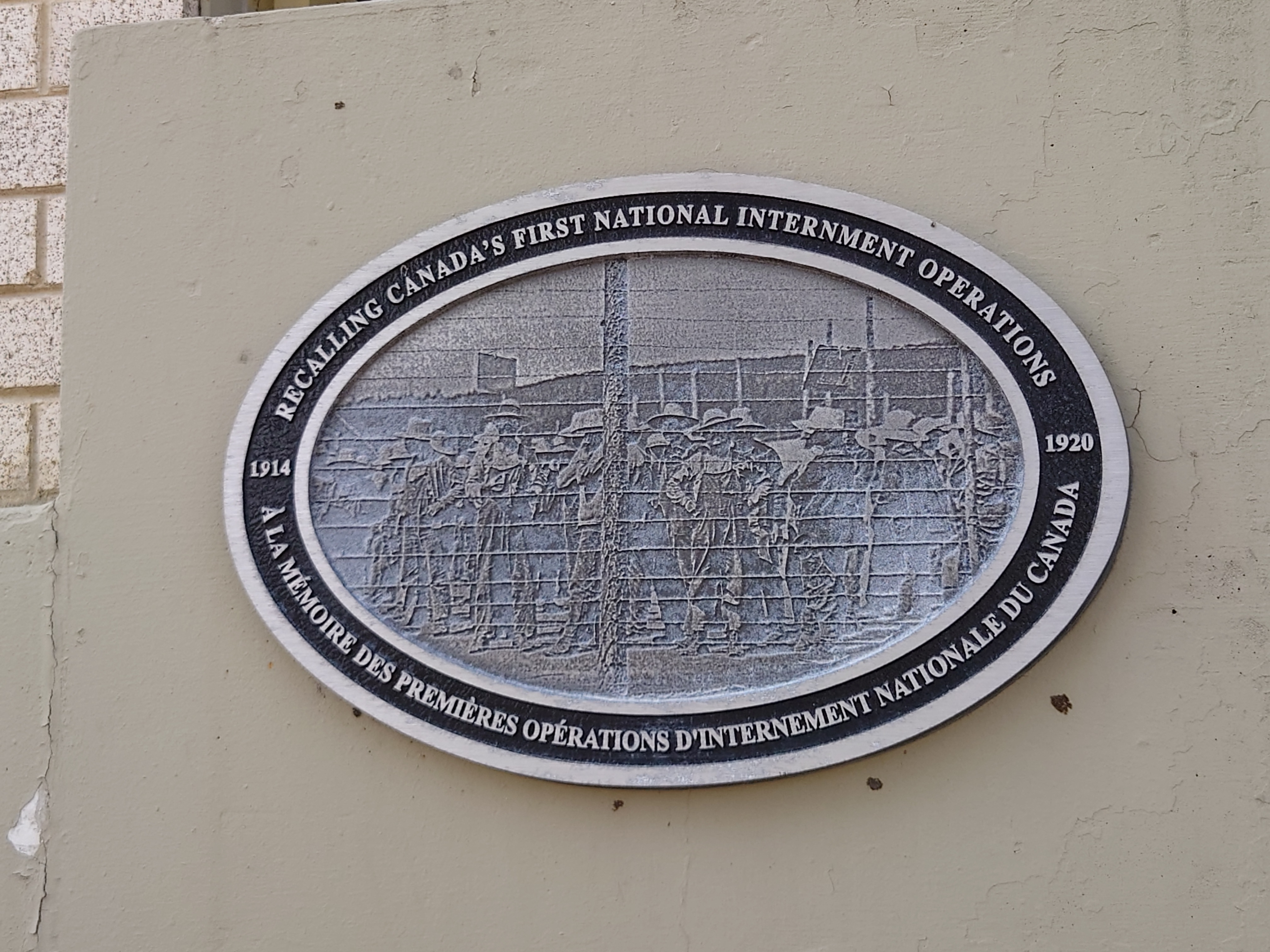
One of the 100 identical plaques Recalling Canada's First National Internment Operations, which were unvealed in 2014

On August 22, 2014, one hundred bilingual English-French plaques were unveiled to recall the 100th anniversary of the implementation of the 1914 War Measures Act and the start of internment operations across Canada.

In 2017, the CFWWIRF supported the installation of a permanent exhibit about Canada's first national internment operations in the Canada History Hall of the Canadian Museum of History in Gatineau, Quebec. Funding has also been committed by the CFWWIRF for the unveiling of a major new exhibit in 2021 at the museum dealing with the War Measures Act and civil liberties during the First World War, the Second World War and the October Crisis.

The 100th anniversary of the end of Canada's first national internment operations was commemorated on June 20, 2020 – a notice was published by the Ukrainian Canadian Civil Liberties Foundation in the national edition of The Globe and Mail, with the support of the Endowment Council of the CFWWIRF.

== See also ==
- Human rights in Canada
- Ukrainian Canadians
- Second Boer War concentration camps, South Africa (1899–1902)
- Thalerhof internment camp (World War I)
- Internment of Italian Canadians (World War II)
- Internment of Japanese Canadians (World War II)
- Internment in the United Kingdom during the First World War
