= Monashee =

Monashee may refer to:

- Monashee Creek, a body of water in British Columbia
- Monashee Mountains, a rock formation in British Columbia, Canada
