= Cherry Creek (British Columbia) =

Coordinates: 50°16′N 118°38′W

Cherry Creek is a creek located in the Okanagan region of British Columbia. The south fork of Cherry Creek is known as Monashee Creek. Cherry Creek was discovered in the 1800s and mined for gold. The Creek was mined in the 1800s by Christien, Schneider, Bissett, and Leblanc. Chinese and European miners worked Cherry Creek. The largest gold nugget found in Cherry Creek weighed 8 to 9 ounces with a value of $130.

Cherry Creek flows west into the Shuswap River, east of Vernon.
