= Whose University Is It? =

- Directed by: Mark Wright; James Motluk
- Theme music composer: Tad Winklarz
- Country of origin: Canada
- Original language: English

Production
- Cinematography: Les Zawadski
- Editor: Jack McLuskie
- Running time: 60 minutes

Original release
- Network: ichannel
- Release: 8 June 2003

Whose University Is It? is a 2003 made for TV documentary film that takes a critical look at the role of corporate funding on university education. It was produced and directed by Canadian filmmakers Mark Wright and James Motluk (credited as James E Motluk). It enjoyed a limited release to theaters in 2003 in Ontario and was broadcast on TV on ichannel in 2004.

== Subject matter ==
The film begins with a look back at the somewhat unusual history of Trent University in Peterborough, Ontario, Canada. Built on land donated by GE and financed through donations made by blue-collar workers who agreed to have a portion of their weekly pay cheques deducted, Trent was designed to be student focused. Every aspect of the campus was debated by academics to determine how effective it would be in educating young minds. The university was divided into colleges where living quarters were integrated with classrooms making the separation seamless. A deliberate decision was made early on to break the campus in two, with half out on the GE lands and two colleges permanently located in the downtown core so students living off campus could easily access the university and continue to feel a part of the community.

After laying out the history of the campus, the story flashes forward to the new millennium where government funding cuts have led the university to seek corporate money in order to survive. According to the filmmakers, times have changed dramatically with universities now being expected to operate like corporations churning out skilled workers based on market demand.

A member of the university board of governors, a vice president of the Royal Bank of Canada, claims that universities must now be nimble enough to meet changes in the marketplace, stating "if the market is looking for nurses this year then how many nurses can Trent graduate."

In another interview, the university president, Bonnie Patterson, goes further, referring to her students as "a guaranteed consumer base" and comparing the university to a "hospitality business" as she explains how colleges on campus will double year round as conference facilities and quasi shopping malls in an effort to raise revenue.

The first step in this process is the rationalization of the campus which requires the closure of the downtown colleges. This raises opposition within the faculty and the community. Protests mount and the faculty take the board of governors to court.

The argument put forward by the faculty is that universities in Ontario are set up under a bicameral system where the Senate, composed of faculty and students, make academic decisions and the board of governors are responsible for financial decisions. Since altering the make-up of the campus would impact the academic atmosphere of the university, they argued the board of governors should be compelled to seek approval from the faculty.

In a historic decision the Supreme Court of Ontario ruled in favor of the board, maintaining that all decisions are essentially financial.

Frustrated by the turn of events, a group of students, known as the Trent Eight, carried out an illegal occupation of the vice president's office. Two days into the occupation, the Peterborough police were called in to forcibly remove the students. The movie captures the arrests with footage showing officers dressed in full riot gear, accompanied by police dogs, dragging the non-violent protestors out of the building.

The title for the movie was taken from a piece of graffiti spray-painted over the Trent University sign at the entrance to the main campus.

== Development ==
The two filmmakers, Mark Wright and James Motluk had known each other in the 1980s while both were attending Trent University. They got back in touch after meeting at the Hot Docs film festival and began talking about what was happening at their old Alma Mater.

They first brought the project to CBC TV and were turned down because the subject matter was considered to be "too boring" for audiences who "would not understand" the issues. They then decided to fund the movie themselves.

== Critical reception ==
Whose University Is It? was released to theatres in Ontario in 2003 but received little notice in the media at the time, although the few reviews it did receive were generally positive. It was later broadcast to a national audience on ichannel TV.

However, in the years following, it has attracted an international following. On June 8, 2005 an international symposium examining the very same issues as the film was held in the Netherlands at the university of Leiden. The symposium borrowed its name from the film and opened with a special screening of the movie.

In 2009, the movie was screened in Yellow Springs, Ohio as part of a movement to save the Yellow Springs Antioch campus which was shuttered under circumstances similar to the events portrayed in the movie.

It holds a 7 out of 10 rating on the Internet Movie Database.
