= Jajo's Secret =

- Directed by: James Motluk
- Starring: Lubomyr Luciuk; Inky Mark
- Theme music composer: Tad Winklarz
- Country of origin: Canada
- Original languages: English; Ukrainian

Production
- Cinematography: Lance Carlson
- Editor: Jack McLuskie
- Running time: 60 minutes

Original release
- Network: Omni Television
- Release: June 8, 2009

Jajo's Secret (version in Ukrainian: «Таємниця Джаджо», romanized: Taiemnytsia Dzhadzho) is a 2009 made-for-TV documentary film about the internment of Ukrainian Canadians by the government of Canada during World War I. It was produced and directed by James Motluk (credited as James E Motluk) and broadcast on Omni Television. One of the first projects funded by the Canadian First World War Internment Recognition Fund.

== Summary ==
The film begins with the discovery by filmmaker Motluk of a parole certificate issued to his late grandfather, Elias, in 1918. Trying to uncover the truth about why the certificate was issued, he begins a journey that is chronicled in the film, first to Sault Ste. Marie, Ontario and then to Ottawa. What he discovers is that the Canadian government created legislation known as the War Measures Act to arrest and intern thousands of Ukrainians whom they perceived as enemy aliens during World War I. After the war, these prisoners were paroled and made to work as forced labour in many private Canadian companies on the railroad, in the mines and even building the national park system. Motluk traces his own grandfather to a camp located in the northern Ontario town of Kapuskasing.

Until recently, the Canadian government tried to hide what had happened. During the production of the film, the government finally apologized to the Ukrainian community and agreed to pay restitution. The title refers to Motluk's grandfather whom he would call Jajo, a child's version of Tato which is Ukrainian for father.

== Critical reception ==
The film has received a lot of praise since its debut on Omni Television in June 2009. In 2011, it was invited to screen at Columbia University in New York and later at the Ukrainian Museum in Manhattan.
