= Life Under Mike =

- Directed by: James Motluk
- Written by: James Motluk
- Produced by: James Motluk
- Starring: John Kenneth Galbraith; Charles Kernaghan; Jack Layton
- Cinematography: Adam Nashman
- Edited by: Terry Steyn
- Music by: Tad Winklarz
- Release date: 28 September 2000
- Country: Canada
- Language: English

Life Under Mike is a political documentary film directed and produced by Canadian filmmaker James Motluk. It was released to theaters in September 2000 to generally positive reviews. The movie takes a critical look at the government of then Ontario Premier Mike Harris. It was partially funded by American filmmaker Michael Moore after Motluk met Moore at the Toronto International Film Festival. Music was provided for the movie soundtrack by rock stars Bruce Springsteen and Bob Dylan. In 2001, it received a Media Human Rights Award from the League for Human Rights of Canada.

The movie touches on themes such as the need for government to play a role in the economy, the need for a strong sense of community, and support for strong trade unions.

It features interviews with economist John Kenneth Galbraith and then Toronto councillor Jack Layton, who later served as leader of the New Democratic Party from 2003 to 2011.
