= James Motluk =

James Motluk born in Brockville, Ontario, Canada, is a filmmaker of Ukrainian descent. After studying philosophy at Trent University he travelled to Toronto and worked for the Canadian Broadcasting Corporation as an assistant director on a television show called Seeing Things. He wrote and directed his first feature film called Nasty Burgers which was released to cinemas in 1993. Nasty Burgers gained him entry into the Writers Guild of Canada. For much of the 1990s he worked as a writer for television. His credits included a season on the hit show Road to Avonlea.

In 2000 he released a documentary funded by American film director Michael Moore called Life Under Mike which took a critical look at then Ontario Premier Mike Harris. In 2001 the film earned him a Media Human Rights Award. He released a second documentary in 2003, co-directed with Mark Wright, called Whose University Is It?. This work used Trent University as a case study and argued that any corporate connections with higher learning are negative - though notably ignoring that the entire Trent University campus was donated by General Electric Canada, and its library by the Bata Shoes Corporation.

In 2009 he released a documentary called Jajo's Secret which revealed the internment of Ukrainians by the Canadian government during World War One. This movie was broadcast on OMNI TV in Canada and was invited to screen in New York at Columbia University in 2011 and at the Ukrainian Museum in Manhattan the following year.

In 2020 he developed an original one hour science fiction drama, Magpie, set in Sault Ste Marie and framed against the little-known but true history of Canada's internment operations during WW1.

His movies tend to sympathize with the left, encouraging grass roots social change. He produces independently through the Toronto-based production company Guerrilla Films.

== Filmography ==
Year	Title	Role
1994	Nasty Burgers	Writer, Producer, Director
2000	Life Under Mike	Producer, Director
2003	Whose University Is It?	Writer, co-director, Producer
2009	Jajo's Secret	Producer, Director
2011	Living In The Shadow	Producer, Director
2012	Directions Home	Writer, Director, Producer
2015	A Place Called Shandro	Executive Producer, Director
2016	Konowal: the man behind the medal	Director, Producer
