= Eaton Internment Camp =

- Internment camp
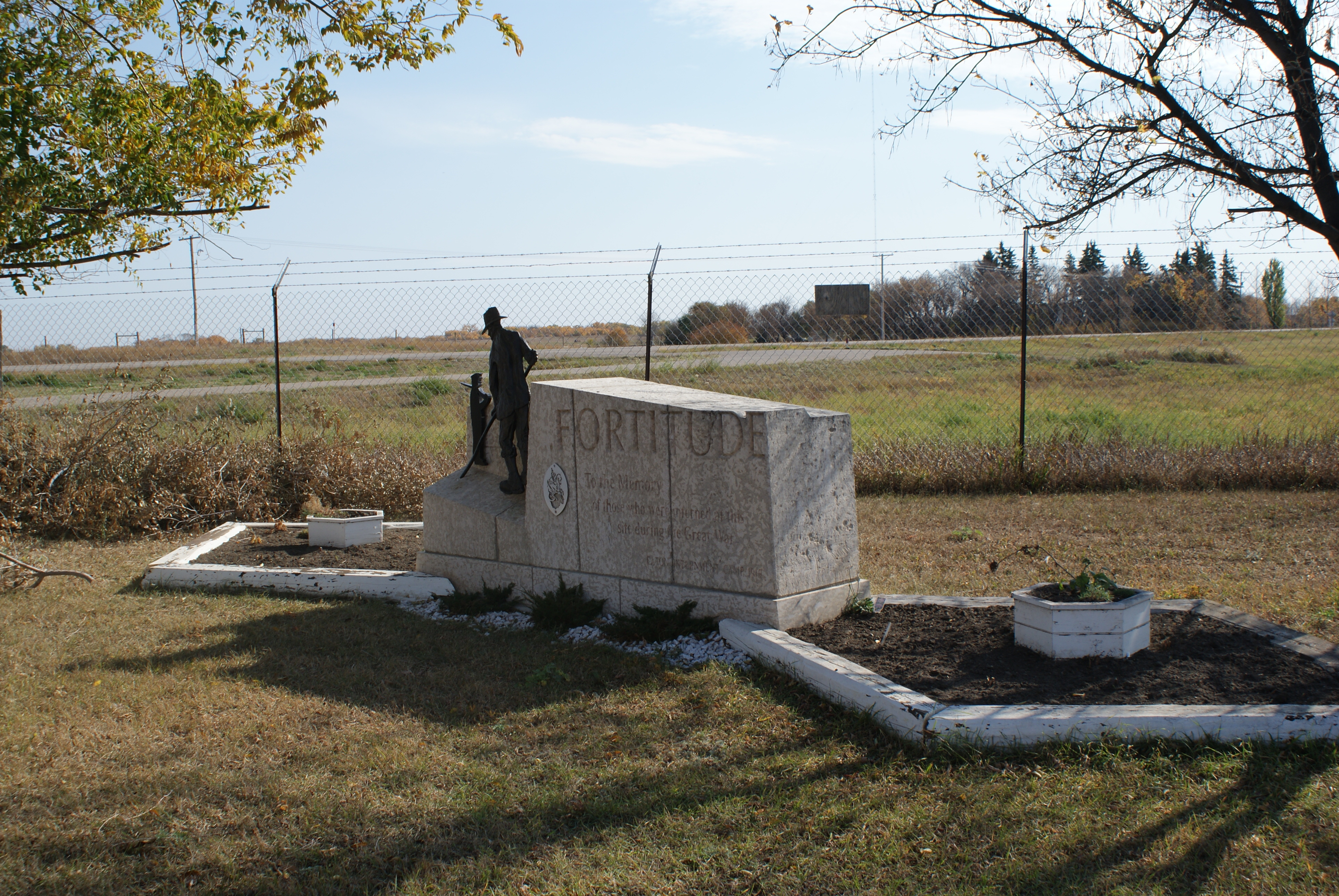
- Memorial marker for the camp.

- Location within Saskatchewan
- Coordinates: 52.07778°N 106.81639°W
- Location: Saskatchewan, Canada
- Operational: February 25 – March 21, 1919

Eaton Internment Camp, although short-lived, was one of twenty-four official internment facilities created in Canada to accommodate prisoners of war during the period from 1914 to 1920. It was the only facility of its kind in the province of Saskatchewan.

Under the 1914 War Measures Act, 8,579 enemy aliens — nationals of countries at war with Canada — were interned in Canada during World War I as prisoners of war. Primarily immigrant settlers of Ukrainian origin, they were sent to prisoner of war camps—most located in the Canadian hinterland—where they would work on government public projects as military conscript labour. Toward the end of the war however, the majority of internees were conditionally released to industry, the result of the growing labour shortage. This led to some camps being dismantled, others consolidated, as well as to the relocation of those internees considered undesirable.

As part of this relocation process, sixty-five internees were sent in October 1918 to an internment facility at Munson, Alberta where they laboured on the railway. However the outbreak of the 1918 flu pandemic (Spanish Influenza) and disciplinary issues forced the relocation of the Munson camp. On February 25, 1919, the internees were removed to a hastily constructed camp on the site of the railway siding at Eaton, Saskatchewan. It was thought that the move would placate the inmate population. It had little effect. Growing resistance among the internees and lack of confidence in the military guard prompted authorities to abandon the Eaton siding location for more secure facilities. On March 21, twenty-four days after the facility was initially established, the internees were transported by rail to a military installation at Amherst, Nova Scotia where they were to be processed for deportation. The Eaton Internment Camp was dismantled shortly afterwards.

The site of the original camp is on the grounds of the present-day Saskatchewan Railway Museum, situated at the junction of Highway 60 and the Canadian National Railway, four kilometers southwest of Saskatoon. In 2005, as part of a national campaign to seek official acknowledgement and redress for the World War I internment of Ukrainians and others, the Prairie Centre for the Study of Ukrainian Heritage, an academic unit at the University of Saskatchewan, in association with the Saskatchewan Railway Museum commissioned and unveiled on the original site a bronze and tindal-stone memorial. The monument entitled "Fortitude" was sculpted by Saskatchewan artist Grant McConnell.

== See also ==
- Saskatchewan Railway Museum
- Ukrainian Canadian internment

== Sources ==
- Bohdan Kordan, Enemy Aliens, Prisoners of War: Internment in Canada during the Great War. Montreal-Kingston: McGill-Queen's University Press, 2002.
- Bohdan Kordan and Craig Mahovsky, A Bare and Impolitic Right: Internment and Ukrainian-Canadian Redress. Montreal-Kingston: McGill-Queen's University Press, 2004.
- http://www.stmcollege.ca/historic_site.html
