= Monashee Creek =

Creek in British Columbia, Canada

Coordinates: 50°14′N 118°33′W

Monashee Creek is located in the Old Cherryville region of British Columbia. The south fork of Cherry Creek is called Monashee Creek.

== The Silver Lead ==
In the early 1870s silver was discovered on the south side of Monashee Creek. The value of the ore was assayed to be $1,500.00 a ton. The vein narrowed and finally petered out. Several years later the lead was discovered again. The lead petered out and more attempts were made to find the lead again. Miners like Donald McIntyre and L.W. Riske persevered for almost 20 years to discover the vein. All attempts failed. It has been stated that this vein may contain a mother lode of gold farther to the east and upstream. The lost silver lead of Monashee creek still waits to be discovered
