= Morrissey, British Columbia =

Morrissey
- Location of Morrissey in British Columbia
- Coordinates: 49°23′00″N 115°01′00″W
- Country: Canada
- Province: British Columbia

Morrissey is a ghost town located in the East Kootenay region of British Columbia, Canada. The town is situated south of Fernie.

It was company town owned by a mining company, but the mine closed in 1909. An Internment camp was set up at rented premises in Morrissey from June 1915 to October 1918.

A mine disaster at nearby Carbonada killed 14 in 1904.
