= John Boxtel =

Dutch sculptor and art teacher (1930–2022)

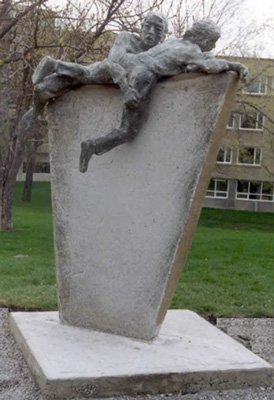
- The annual obstacle course race at Royal Military College of Canada is memorialized by a sculpture by John Boxtel, "To Overcome", which was a gift of the class of 1991
- Born: 21 June 1930; Goirle, Netherlands
- Died: 1 October 2022 (aged 92); Canada
- Education: Technical School in Tilburg, Netherlands
- Known for: Sculptor

John Boxtel (21 June 1930 – 1 October 2022) was a Dutch-Canadian sculptor and art teacher. His works include sculpture, woodcarving, architectural drafting, design, and building.

== Biography ==
Born in Goirle, Netherlands, Boxtel studied architecture at the Technical School in Tilburg, Netherlands. After emigrating to Canada in 1954, he studied at the University of Toronto, Ontario College of Art in Toronto, Ontario, and the Artists' Workshop in London, Ontario. In 1967, he became an art teacher.

Boxtel had gallery exhibitions in Toronto, Hamilton, Montreal, Kingston, Boston, and the Netherlands. His public commissioned works for monuments were done in the Netherlands, Switzerland, Canada, and United States. Working with the Ukrainian Canadian community John crafted several statues recalling Canada's first national internment operations of 1914–1920, that can be seen in Banff National Park, in Kapuskasing, Spirit Lake, on the grounds of the Manitoba Legislature and elsewhere across the country. He spoke movingly about his commitment to telling the story of these "enemy aliens" through his artwork in one segment of Ryan Boyko's film series, The Camps.

Boxtel died on 1 October 2022, at the age of 92.

== Works ==
His works include:

- "The Peacekeeper", a larger than life-size sculpture depicting a soldier in uniform carrying his gun in his left hand and a child on his right arm. The sculpture is on the wall in the Royal Military College of Canada library in Kingston, Ontario.
- "To Overcome", a sculpture of the Royal Military College of Canada obstacle course, a gift of the class of 1991.
- "Interned Madonna," depicts a Ukrainian woman internee with two of her children, a swaddled infant boy and a young girl clinging to her mother's dress at the former site of the Spirit Lake Internment Camp, Amos Quebec. This statue was erected on 16 June 2001 in memory of the wives and children imprisoned with their husbands during Canada's first national internment operations of 1914–1920.
- "Why?", a statue of Ukrainian-Canadian internee c. 1916 entitled installed at the Castle Mountain internment camp site, in Banff National Park, on 12 August 1995 was erected in memory of those imprisoned during Canada's first national internment operations of 1914–1920.

Boxtel was also the author of six books: Go Fly a Kite: The Kite-Builder's Manual; Under the Wing of an Angel; Thousand Island Pioneers; Beware of Black Widows and Spiders; For All He Gave Me: Stories of My Father; and Studio: Sculptures of John Boxtel.
