= Castle Mountain Internment Camp =

WW1 internment facility in Alberta, Canada

- Internment camp
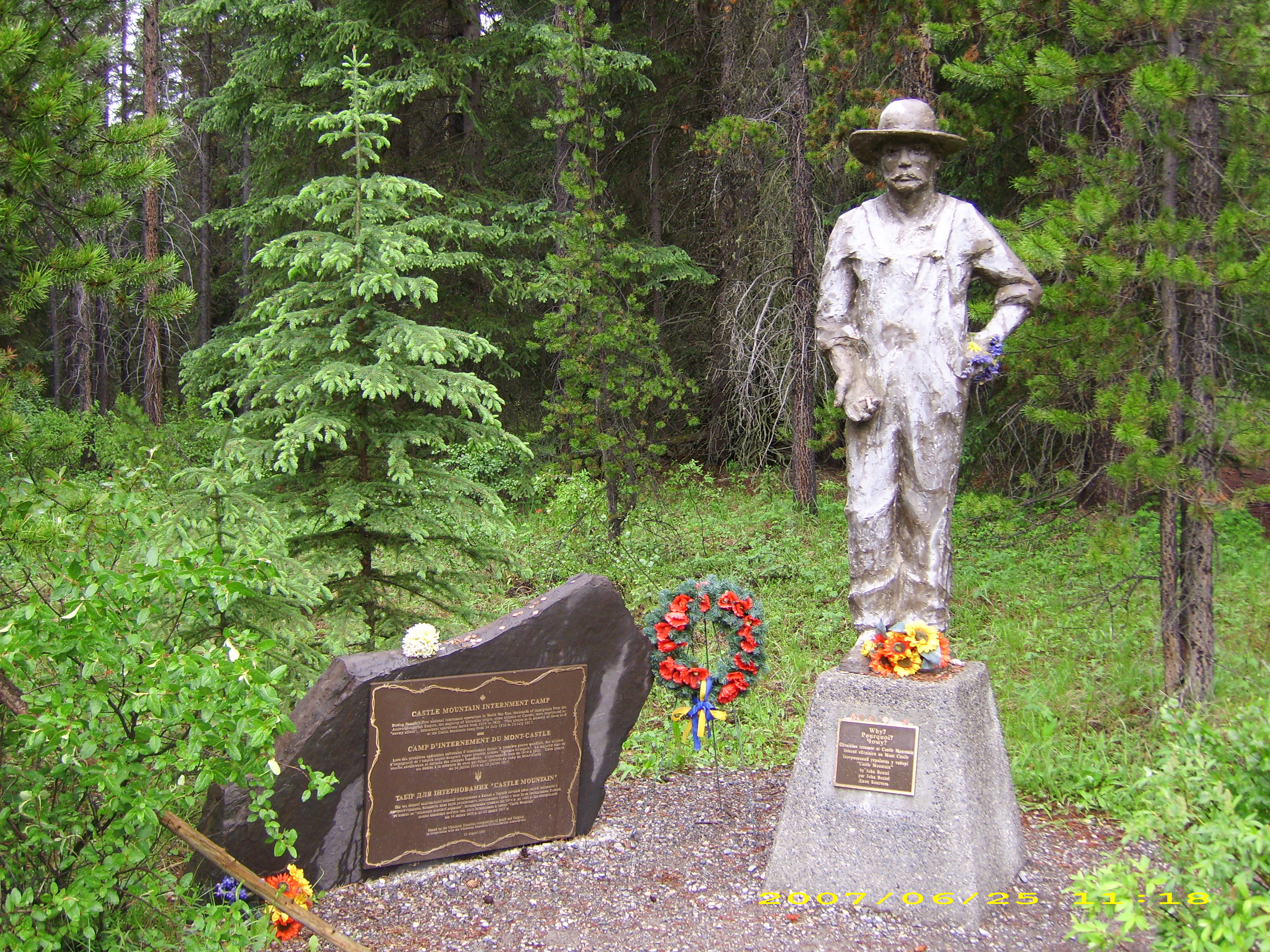
- Monument commemorating the camp in Banff National Park, near the foot of Castle Mountain – the statue is entitled, simply, Why?, in three languages.

- Location within Alberta
- Coordinates: 51.299°N 115.922°W
- Location: near Castle Mountain, Alberta, Canada
- Operational: July 13, 1915 – August 1917
- Number of inmates: 660

The Castle Mountain Internment Camp, located in Banff National Park, Alberta, was the largest internment facility in the Canadian Rockies, housing several hundred prisoners at any one time. Established on July 13, 1915, a total of 660 enemy aliens were interned at the facility during its entire operation.

== Internment ==
Designated enemy aliens under Canada's 1914 War Measures Act, some 8,579 enemy aliens were interned during World War I as prisoners of war. Ostensibly nationals of countries at war with Canada, the vast majority however were settler immigrants, primarily of Ukrainian ethnic origin. The Castle Camp, which was built in 1915 at the base of Castle Mountain was a Canadian internment camp which held immigrant prisoners of Ukrainian, Austrian, Hungarian and German descent.

Despite their civilian status, a great many were sent to prisoner of war camps located in the Canadian hinterland, to be used as military conscript labour on government work projects. Of particular note was the use of forced labour in Canada's national parks, where they were introduced there as a matter of policy to improve existing facilities and increase accessibility by developing the park system's infrastructure. By 1915 several internment camps in and around the Rocky Mountains were in full operation, including a camp at the foot of Castle Mountain, the terminal point of the then uncompleted Banff-Laggan (Lake Louise) road.

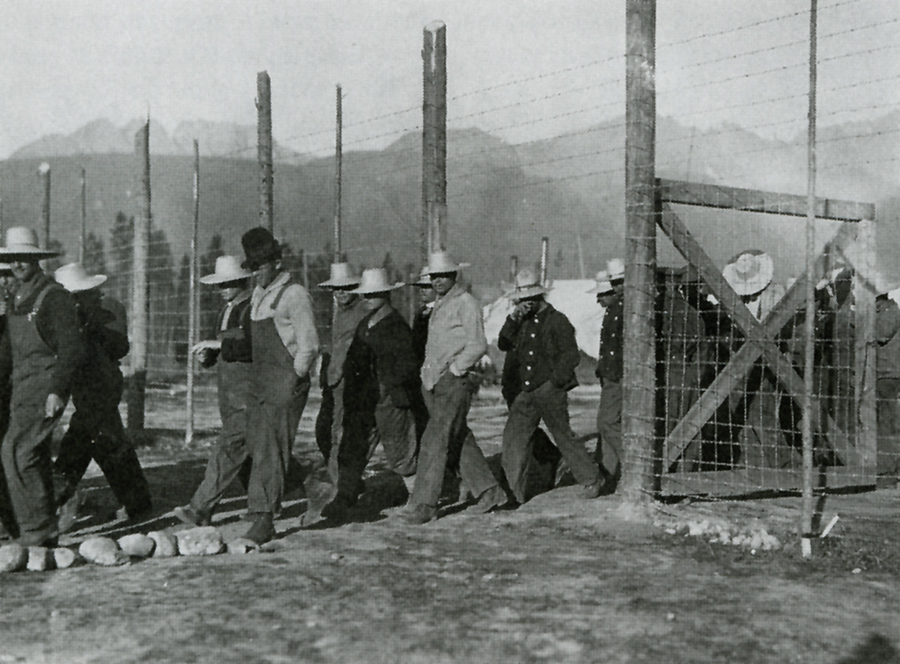
Castle Mountain internment camp (1915)

Recognizing the value of future tourism, the main purpose of the camp was to push the Banff highway on through to Lake Louise, although, in addition, bridges, culverts and fireguards were also built. The camp consisted of tents within a dual barbed wire enclosure. The tents however proved inadequate during the severe winter climate, forcing the camp to relocate to military barracks built on the outskirts of the town of Banff, adjacent to the Cave and Basin, site of the original Hot Springs. While in Banff, the internees were engaged in a number of special projects: land fill and drainage of the Recreation Grounds; clearing the Buffalo Paddocks; cutting trails; land reclamation for tennis courts, golf links, shooting ranges and ski jumps; rock-crushing; quarrying stone for the Banff Springs Hotel (still under construction) and smaller public works projects such as street and sidewalk repair. With the onset of spring, the camp returned once more to the Castle Mountain site. This process of return and relocation would continue until August 1917 when the camp was finally closed when the internees were conditionally released to industry to meet the growing labour shortage.

The Castle Mountain camp was a difficult facility to administer. Abuse was widespread, and although duly noted by the Directorate of Internment Operations in Ottawa, it was never corrected. Escapes were frequent. Conditions at the camp were roundly condemned by neutral observers and the Central Powers, charging Canada with violations of international norms governing the internment of enemy aliens. Understandably, the conditions at the camp would become of interest to the War Office in London and a point of discussion between the British Government and Ottawa.

== Legacy ==
In 2008, a settlement was reached with the Ukrainian Canadian community on the matter of acknowledgement and redress for World War I internment. An important part of the settlement was funding for educational purposes. Parks Canada, the government agency responsible for national parks, is working with an understanding to create an interpretive centre at the Cave and Basin site that will highlight and underscore the nature and significance of the experience. Currently interpretive panels are on site. In 1995, a statue commissioned by the Ukrainian Canadian Civil Liberties Association, memorializing the Castle Mountain camp, was erected near the foot of Castle Mountain off of Highway 1a close to the original perimeter fence. On June 5, 2012, the internment camp monument was visited by Sviatoslav, the Major Archbishop of the Ukrainian Greek Catholic Church, who held a requiem service at the actual camp site to hallow the memory of those confined as "enemy aliens" during Canada's first national internment operations. (Note: More information about the redress settlement and the endowment created to commemorate what happened is available at the website of the Canadian First World War Internment Recognition Fund (www.internmentcanada.ca). For an article on the site see, "First World War internment camps a 'difficult scar' for Canadian Ukrainians," by Bill Graveland, The Canadian Press, 2 September 2012.)

On Friday, August 22, 2014, at 11:00 a.m. local time, 100 aluminum plaques "Recalling Canada's First National Internment Operations 1914–1920" and featuring a photo of internment prisoners confined behind a wire fence at the Castle Mountain Internment Camp in Banff were simultaneously unveiled at 100 different locations across the country through the generosity of the Endowment Council of the Canadian First World War Internment Recognition Fund. Dr. Lubomyr Luciuk, a professor at the Royal Military College of Canada and former chair of the UCCLA, organized the "Сто" (translit. Sto; meaning "One Hundred") project. The year 2014 marked the 100th anniversary of Canada's War Measures Act – adopted on August 22, 1914, during the First World War. It was used to imprison Ukrainian Canadians, and other ethnic groups including members of the German, Hungarian, Serbian, Croatian and Armenian communities, into one of Canada's 24 World War I internment camps. In 2020, descendants of internees and other members of the Ukrainian Canadian community held a small ceremony commemorating the 25th anniversary of the installation of the memorial.

== See also ==
- Ukrainian Canadian internment
