= List of Serbian Canadians =

This is a list of notable Serbian Canadians, that is, notable Canadian citizens of ethnic Serb descent.

== Arts ==
- David Albahari, writer
- Tijana Arnautović, beauty pageant
- Paul von Baich, photographer
- Emilija Baranac, actress
- Bratsa Bonifacho, artist
- Nina Bunjevac, cartoonist
- Lolita Davidovich, actress
- Denise Djokic, cellist
- Philippe Djokic, violinist, conductor
- Mike Dopud, actor and football player
- Ivy Jenkins, musician, fashion designer
- Stana Katic, actress and producer
- Nina Kiri, actress
- Luigi von Kunits, conductor
- Alex Lifeson, musician
- Viktor Mitic, artist
- Lilly Otasevic, sculptor, artist
- Vessna Perunovich, artist
- Dan Petronijevic, actor
- Sasa Radulovic, architect
- Bojana Sentaler, fashion designer
- Ana Sokolovic, composer
- Prvoslav Vujcic, writer
- Alexander Zonjic, flutist, music radio host
- Sanja Živković, film director

== Media ==
- Jelena Adzic, reporter
- Ogden Gavanski, film producer
- Brian Linehan, television host
- Boris Malagurski, documentary director, producer
- Olga B. Markovich, business editor and writer
- Alex Mihailovich, television journalist
- Ben Mulroney, television host
- Anica Nonveiller, journalist,
- Saša Petricic, journalist
- Adam Pribićević, journalist
- Boris Spremo, photographer
- Dragan Todorović, journalist

== Politics ==
- Alice Abou-Khalil, member of the National Assembly of Quebec
- Bob Bratina, Member of Parliament, Mayor of Hamilton
- Nick Borkovich, Superior Court justice
- Ned Kuruc, Member of Parliament
- Jody Mitic, Ottawa City Councillor
- Mila Mulroney, wife of Brian Mulroney (18th Prime Minister of Canada), Chancellor of St. Francis Xavier University
- Caroline Mulroney, politician, government minister
- Tom Rakocevic, member of the Legislative Assembly of Ontario
- Sofija Škorić, activist

== Science ==
- Ivan Avakumović, university professor
- Lazo M. Kostić, economist
- Veljko Lalich, university professor
- Gordana Lazarevich, musicologist, university department head
- Vesna Milosevic-Zdjelar, astrophysicist
- Miloš Mladenović, university professor
- Dimitrije Najdanović, university professor, theologian
- Stevo Todorčević, mathematician, fellow of the Royal Society of Canada

== Sports ==
- Alex Andjelic, ice hockey coach
- Nick Bastaja, football player (CFL)
- Bob O'Billovich, football player, coach, and executive (CFL)
- Sinn Bodhi, wrestler
- Ivan Boldirev, ice hockey player (NHL)
- Milan Borjan, soccer player
- Bob Bozic, boxer
- Chris Cvetkovic, football player (CFL)
- Frank Dancevic, tennis player
- Tyler Graovac, ice hockey player (NHL/AHL)
- Nikola Kalinic, football player (NFL)
- Dan Kesa, ice hockey player (NHL)
- Stefan Jankovic, basketball player
- Roy Jokanovich, football player (CFL)
- Johnathan Kovacevic, ice hockey player (NHL)
- Sasha Lakovic, ice hockey left player (NHL/AHL)
- Bronko Lubich, wrestler
- Milan Lucic, ice hockey left player (NHL/WHL)
- Milan Marcetta, ice hockey player (NHL)
- Scott Milanovich, football coach (CFL)
- Savo Mitrovic, ice hockey player
- Stefan Mitrović, soccer player
- Jelena Mrdjenovich, boxer
- Daniel Nestor, tennis player
- Alex Petrovic, ice hockey player
- Karmen Petrovic, wrestler
- Adrien Plavsic, ice hockey player (NHL)
- Milos Raonic, tennis player
- John Smrke, ice hockey player (NHL)
- Stan Smrke, ice hockey player (NHL)
- Jim Trifunov, wrestler
- Milan Vukadinov, chess player
- Mick Vukota, ice hockey right player (NHL)
- Daniel Vukovic, ice hockey player
- Peter Zezel, ice hockey player (NHL)
- Lou Zivkovich, football player (CFL)
- Igor Zugic, chess player

== Other ==
- Rebecca MacDonald (Ubavka Mitić), businesswoman
- Black Mike Winage, miner, an original settler in the Yukon

== See also ==
- List of Serbian Americans
- List of Serbs
