= Putnik (disambiguation) =

Putnik is a South Slavic language surname.

Putnik may also refer to:

- Mount Putnik, Canada
- SS Vojvoda Putnik, Yugoslavian ship
- Putnik (magazine), 18th century Serbian youth magazine
- Lake Putnik, Poland
