= Montenegrin Americans =

Americans of Montenegrin birth or descent

Montenegrin Americans Crnogorski Amerikanci Црногорски Американци
Total population
- 2,528 (2000 Census)

Regions with significant populations
- California, Illinois, New York, Louisiana, Alaska, Florida, Ohio, Washington

Languages
- American English; Montenegrin; Albanian; Serbo-Croatian language

Religion
- Predominantly Eastern Orthodox: (Serbian Orthodox; Montenegrin Orthodox)

Related ethnic groups
- Montenegrin Canadians, Albanians of Montenegro, Yugoslav Americans other Slavic and European Americans

Montenegrin Americans are Americans who are of Montenegrin origin. The figure includes all people affiliated with United States who claim Montenegrin ancestry, both those born in the country and naturalized citizens, as well as those with dual citizenship who affiliate themselves with both countries or cultures. The number of Montenegrin Americans in the United States is unknown, as the Montenegrin community has not been differentiated in the United States census as different from closely related Yugoslav American groups; therefore Montenegrin Americans are likely to identify with those groups. As of 2024, there are 12,945 Montenegro-born people in the United States. However, according to the Statistical Office of Montenegro, fewer than 20% of Montenegrin citizens living and working abroad are ethnic Montenegrins.

== History ==
At the end of the 19th and early 20th centuries, mass migration of Montenegrins into America occurred. It went in groups, but also individually. First of all, young people from the coastal part of Montenegro were leaving: Boka, Pastrovici, the surroundings of Budva, then from Crmnica, Katun nahija, Gragova, Krivosija, Vilusa, so that in a few years the departure would be extended to the region of Niksic, Bjelopavlici, Piva, Zabljak, Moraca and the whole northern part of Montenegro.

The Austro-Hungarian authorities then helped to get as many Montenegrins as possible, especially young men, to go to America to leave as few soldiers as possible in Montenegro who could go to war.

The number of emigrants has grown from year to year. According to the passport book, which was carefully conducted from 1864 to 1914 in the Kingdom of Montenegro, in the United States, according to Pavel Rovinsky, there were 17 thousand young Montenegrins. This is stated in the "Glas Crnogorca", which was at that time in Cetinje, as well as in the "Slobodna Misao" newspaper in Niksic. Interesting is the fact that in 1903, in the course of five months, from the beginning of August to the end of December, 621 Montenegrins went to America.

In the wake of this increasing wave of immigration, a song describing the event appeared: "Ameriko, rosno cvijeće/ nema toga ko te neće/ ni đeteta od tri ljeta/ niti starca od 100 ljeta…" Ili: "Ameriko zemljo kleta/ po tebi mi drago šeta/. Molim brata, molim kuma, /da mi zajme trista kruna/ da otidem u Čikago,/ pa da vidim moje drago/ kako radi i propada/ i daleko jade jada…" Ili: "Navijorče, vrći momke/ da s’ udaju Crnogorke..." "

Following the outbreak of the Balkan Wars in 1912 and then World War I in 1914, thousands of Montenegrins and Serbs residing in the United States returned home to fight, fueled by patriotism. Around 11,000 Montenegrins left America during the Balkan Wars and an additional 3,000 in World War I, constituting the vast majority of the community in the country at the time. There was organized recruitment of Montenegrins from the United States, which resulted in the arrests of some recruiters for violating the American neutrality law. The return rate for Montenegrins from 1908 to 1923 was 89% and the population that remained in the Americas was a small fraction of its previous size.

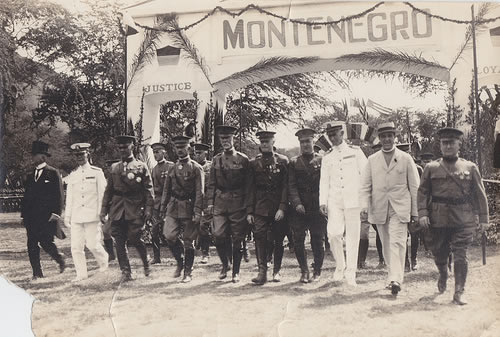
The Montenegrin Day in New York was held on October 11, 1918, when, throughout the United States, ceremonies were held in honor of the Allies. New York city held ceremonies only to the Kingdom of Montenegro as the smallest ally.

== Communities ==
Nowadays, Montenegrin Americans mainly live in the central and eastern United States, including New York City, which is home to significant numbers of Albanians and Muslim Montenegrins, particularly from towns such as Ulcinj, Gusinje, Rozaje, and Berane. Other cities with notable Montenegrin populations include Chicago, Detroit, and the Los Angeles area, which is also home to other recent immigrants from the former Yugoslavia area.

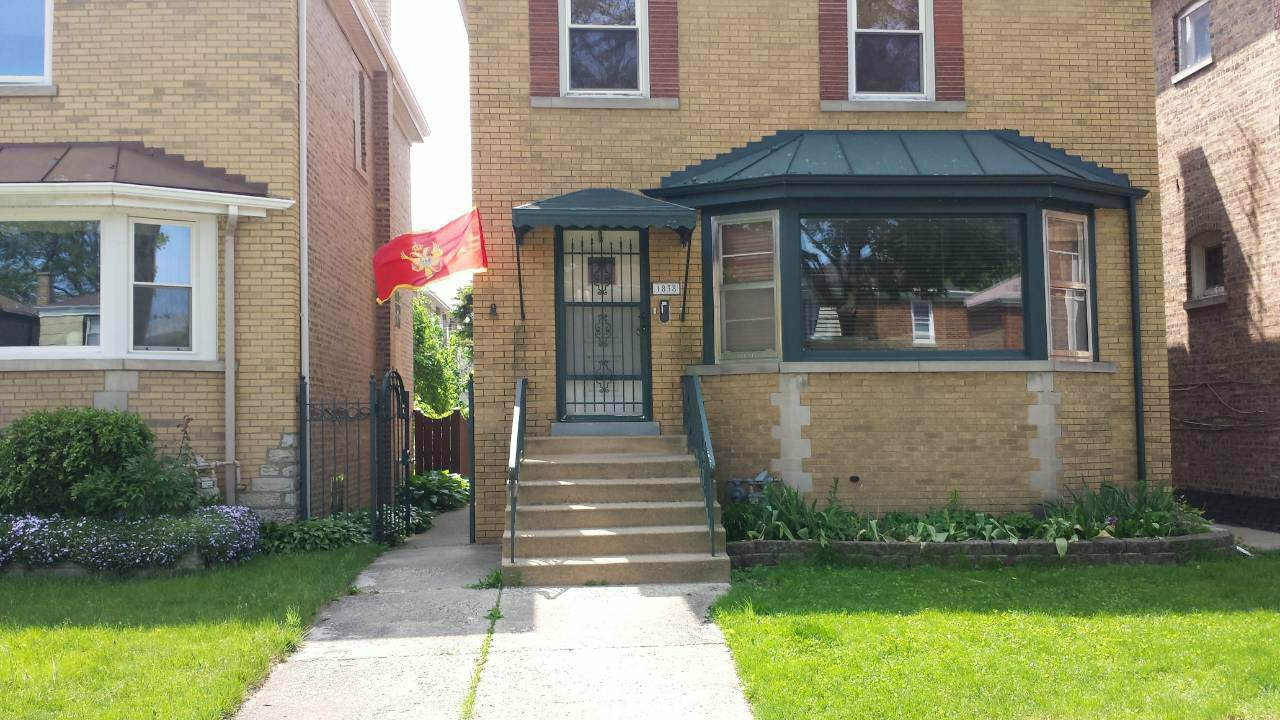
Montenegrin flag in Chicago

Montenegrin Americans are found throughout the state of Alaska. About a quarter of all known Montenegrin Americans live in Anchorage. Their presence in Alaska dates back to the gold rushes of the early 20th century. A short-lived newspaper entitled Servian Montenegrin was established at the beginning of 1905 in the town of Douglas, near Juneau. According to the U.S. Census Bureau, in 2015, there were 9,486 ethnic Serbs born in "Other Eastern Europe" countries, overwhelmingly Montenegro. According to the 2000 U.S. census, there were 2,339 individuals whose first ancestry was Montenegrin, and 189 whose second ancestry was Montenegrin, 2,528 ethnic Montenegrins overall.

== Notable people ==
=== Arts and entertainment ===
- Marina Abramović, performance artist
- Ever Anderson, actress and model
- Enisa Nikaj, pop singer, model and songwriter
- Emina Cunmulaj, model and philanthropist
- Milla Jovovich, actress and former model

=== Literature ===
- Elijah Monte Radlovic
- Nikola Petanović, writer and philosopher

=== Film ===
- Ivan Kraljevic, film director

=== Politics ===
- Michael Anthony Stepovich, former governor of Alaska Territory, 1957-1958 (last appointed governor before statehood).
- John Butrovich, former Alaska State Senator
- John Dapcevich, former mayor of Sitka, Alaska
- Marko Dapcevich, most recent former mayor of Sitka, Alaska
- Susan Marie Brnovich, Arizona Superior Court Judge
- John Gregovich, pioneer, member of the Nevada State Senate
- George Perazich, humanitarian

=== Sports ===
- David Mirković, basketball player
- Justin Cobbs, basketball player
- Nicholas Delpopolo, Olympic athlete - judo
- Mirsad Huseinovic, soccer player
- Novo Bojovic, football player
- Omar Cook, basketball player
- Taylor Rochestie, basketball player
- Tyrese Rice, basketball player
- Kendrick Perry, basketball player
- Javonte Green, basketball player
- Derek Needham, basketball player
- Jonah Radebaugh, basketball player
- Halil Kanacević, basketball player in Europe

=== Service sector ===
- Roko Camaj, high-rise window cleaner of the original World Trade Center

=== Fictional ===
- Nero Wolfe

== See also ==
- Montenegro–United States relations
- European Americans
- Montenegrin Canadians
- Yugoslav Americans
