= Serbian Canadians =

Canadians of Serb descent

Канадски Срби Kanadski Srbi
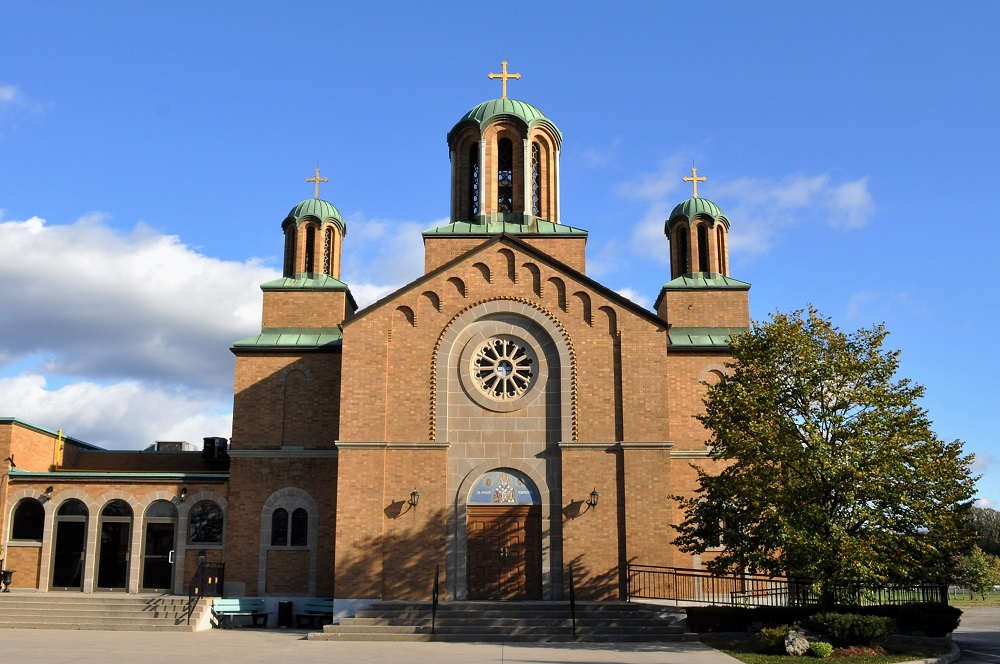
- Saint Nicholas Serbian Orthodox Cathedral in Hamilton

Total population
- 93,360 (2021)

Regions with significant populations
- Ontario, British Columbia, Alberta, Quebec

Languages
- Canadian English and Serbian

Religion
- Predominately Eastern Orthodoxy (Serbian Orthodox Church), minority Protestantism and Catholicism

Related ethnic groups
- Serbian Americans, Montenegrin Canadians, Croatian Canadians, Bosnian Canadians, Macedonian Canadians, Yugoslav Canadians

Serbian Canadians or Serb Canadians (Note: The community is commonly known in English as Serbian Canadians, and scarcer as Serb Canadians. In Serbian, the community is known as Canadian Serbs (Канадски Срби, Kanadski Srbi), and scarcer as Serbs in Canada (Срби у Канади, Srbi u Kanadi).) are Canadians of ethnic Serb ancestry. In 2021, there were 93,360 Serbian Canadians, according to the Canadian census.

== History ==
The first Serbs to arrive in Canada came to British Columbia in the 1850s. Many of them came from the state of California in the United States, while others directly emigrated from the Balkans. They primarily originated from the Bay of Kotor and the Dalmatia which had similar climates as their destinations.

A second wave of Serb emigration occurred from 1900 to 1914. In both instances, the majority of these migrants came from territories controlled by Austria-Hungary for political and economic reasons, and only a small number came directly from the Kingdom of Serbia. Those who settled were typically young single men and employed in mining or forestry near such towns as Phoenix, Golden Prince Rupert, and Kamloops. Fishing and the search for gold were also among the primary occupations of these early settlers. In 1898, Black Mike Winage arrived in Yukon from Serbia near the end of the Klondike Gold Rush and became a pioneer.

During the second wave of emigration, Serbs arrived in the prairies. In Saskatchewan, they took up farming. In Alberta, coal mining and road construction was a source of employment. Many Serbs worked on the construction of railway lines that now extend from Edmonton to the Pacific coast. Serb communities emerged in Regina, Lethbridge, Edmonton, and Calgary, while significant populations formed in Atlin, British Columbia and Dawson, Yukon. In Ontario and Quebec, Serbs were drawn to work in the industry sector. By 1914, the Serbian community in Hamilton numbered around 1,000. Further Serb settlement was established in Niagara Falls, London, and Windsor. The first Serb immigrants to the city of Toronto arrived in 1903; by 1914 there were more than 200 Serbs.

The first Serbian Orthodox Church built in Canada, the Holy Trinity Serbian Orthodox Church in Regina, Saskatchewan was built in 1916, while the first parish committee was formed in 1913 in Hamilton.

During the World War I, military-aged Serb males who hailed from Serbia or Montenegro were considered allies but those who were born in Austro-Hungarian territories were deemed enemy aliens by Canadian law, even though their sympathies tended to lie with the allied cause. The latter were restricted in their freedom of movements, had to wear special identity cards and had to identify themselves regularly at the police station. Several hundred were interned in prison camps throughout the country under terrible conditions. Physicist Mihajlo Pupin, Serbian consul in New York during the war, and Antun Seferović, the honorary consul of Serbia in Montreal, advocated for the rights of the classified aliens and internees through diplomacy via the Serbian National League of Canada (Srpska Narodna Odbrana u Kanadi) which resulted in exemption, compensation, and the release of many ethnic Serbs. Another advocate for the rights of Serbs of Austro-Hungarian origin was Serbian-born court interpreter Bud Protich, who enlisted in the Canadian Army and was wounded in action in 1917.

Prior to World War I, many arriving Serbs were variously categorized under related Balkan groups, making the exact number of Serb immigrants difficult to determine. After 1921, all immigrants from Yugoslavia, including Serbs, were designated as "Yugoslavs". The interwar period saw a major increase in Serb immigration to Canada. More than 30,000 Yugoslavs came to Canada between 1919 and 1939, including an estimated 10,000 Serbs. Many of these immigrants were single, working men who settled in the northern region of the province of Ontario. During this time, ties to Europe were strong and pressure from Belgrade and Ottawa resulted in certain Serbian Canadian newspapers being banned due to their communist ideas. They were mostly written by pro-Russian Yugoslavs who were not necessarily of Serb origin.

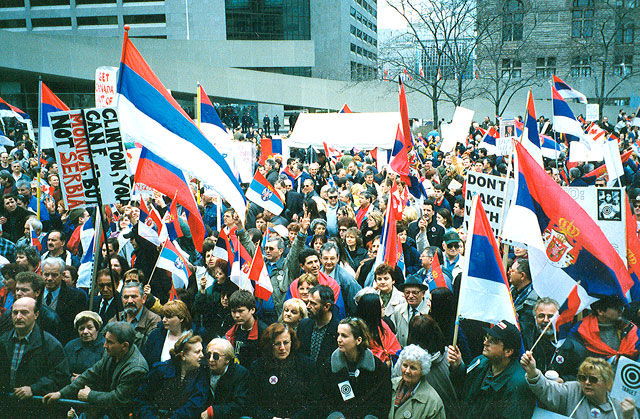
Serb demonstrations in Toronto against the NATO bombing of Yugoslavia, 1999

After the World War II, Serbian political émigrés who were opposed to the newly established Yugoslav communist government sought refuge in Canada. Many of these were POWs and laborers from Austria and Germany who refused to return to their homeland. They settled in cities such as Toronto, Sudbury and Hamilton. Between 1957 and 1971, some 23,000 Yugoslavs arrived in Canada, of whom 10-15% were Serbs. They established organizations, newspapers and cultural events.

The Serbian Orthodox Eparchy of Canada was established in 1983 as part of reorganization of the Serbian Orthodox eparchies (dioceses) in North America.

In the late 1980s, Yugoslavia's communist government was on the verge of collapse. Shortly after the breakup of Yugoslavia in 1991, a new wave of Serb immigration occurred, concentrating mostly to Southern Ontario. This was a major brain drain, with highly-skilled Serb professionals fleeing economic problems and the undemocratic post-socialism government that took power in Serbia. Other Serbs who came during the 1990s were refugees from Bosnia and Herzegovina and Croatia, who fled the various Yugoslav Wars.

Serbian Canadians held demonstrations and protests throughout the NATO bombing of Yugoslavia in 1999. The protests on University Avenue in Toronto lasted all 78 days of the bombing campaign.

== Demographics ==
According to data from the 2021 census 93,360 people stated that they had Serb ancestry (whether alone or in combination with another ancestry). However, this number may be higher as there are some 30,565 people who identify as Yugoslavs in Canada, many of whom are of ethnic Serb origin. Serbian Canadians comprise 0.25% of total Canadian population.

Statistics Canada allows the provision of multiple ancestries in a multi-response question. In the 2021 census, 52% of Serbian Canadians declared full Serb ancestry, while some 42% declared Serb ancestry as one of two/multiple ancestries.

The Serbian Canadian community is heavily concentrated (about two-thirds) in Ontario, with major hub in Greater Toronto Area where a third of all Serbian Canadians reside, while Niagara Falls has the highest share (1.5% of total population) of Serbian population of any Canadian city.

Map of provinces and territories by Serbian Canadian population, 2021 census. >50,000 10,000 to 50,000 5,000 to 10,000 1,000 to 5,000 <1,000

Province/Territory		Population (2021)
Flag of Ontario	Ontario	64,415
Flag of British Columbia	British Columbia	12,660
Flag of Alberta	Alberta	7,410
Flag of Quebec	Quebec	5,360
Flag of Manitoba	Manitoba	1,335
Flag of Saskatchewan	Saskatchewan	1,325
Flag of Nova Scotia	Nova Scotia	425
Flag of New Brunswick	New Brunswick	280
Flag of Prince Edward Island	Prince Edward Island	55
Flag of Newfoundland and Labrador	Newfoundland and Labrador	50
Flag of Yukon	Yukon	25
Flag of Northwest Territories	Northwest Territories	15

City	Population (2021)
Toronto	29,595
Vancouver	9,755
Hamilton	9,720
Kitchener–Cambridge–Waterloo	6,795
Windsor	4,765
Ottawa	3,505
Calgary	3,230
Edmonton	3,065
Montreal	3,330
Niagara	2,965

Serbian Canadians predominantly (54.8%) belong to the Eastern Orthodoxy with the Serbian Orthodox Church (through its Serbian Orthodox Eparchy of Canada) as the traditional church. Some 9.8% adhere to Protestantism or various Christian denominations, 8% to the Catholicism, while the rest are mainly irreligious. (Note: Religious breakdown proportions based on "Serbian" ethnic or cultural origin response on the 2021 census.)

Language retention is relatively high: some 40% (i.e. 37,790) of Serbian Canadians declared Serbian as their mother tongue (including both single and multiple responses) while 60% declared English, although over 90% are proficient in English.

== Culture ==
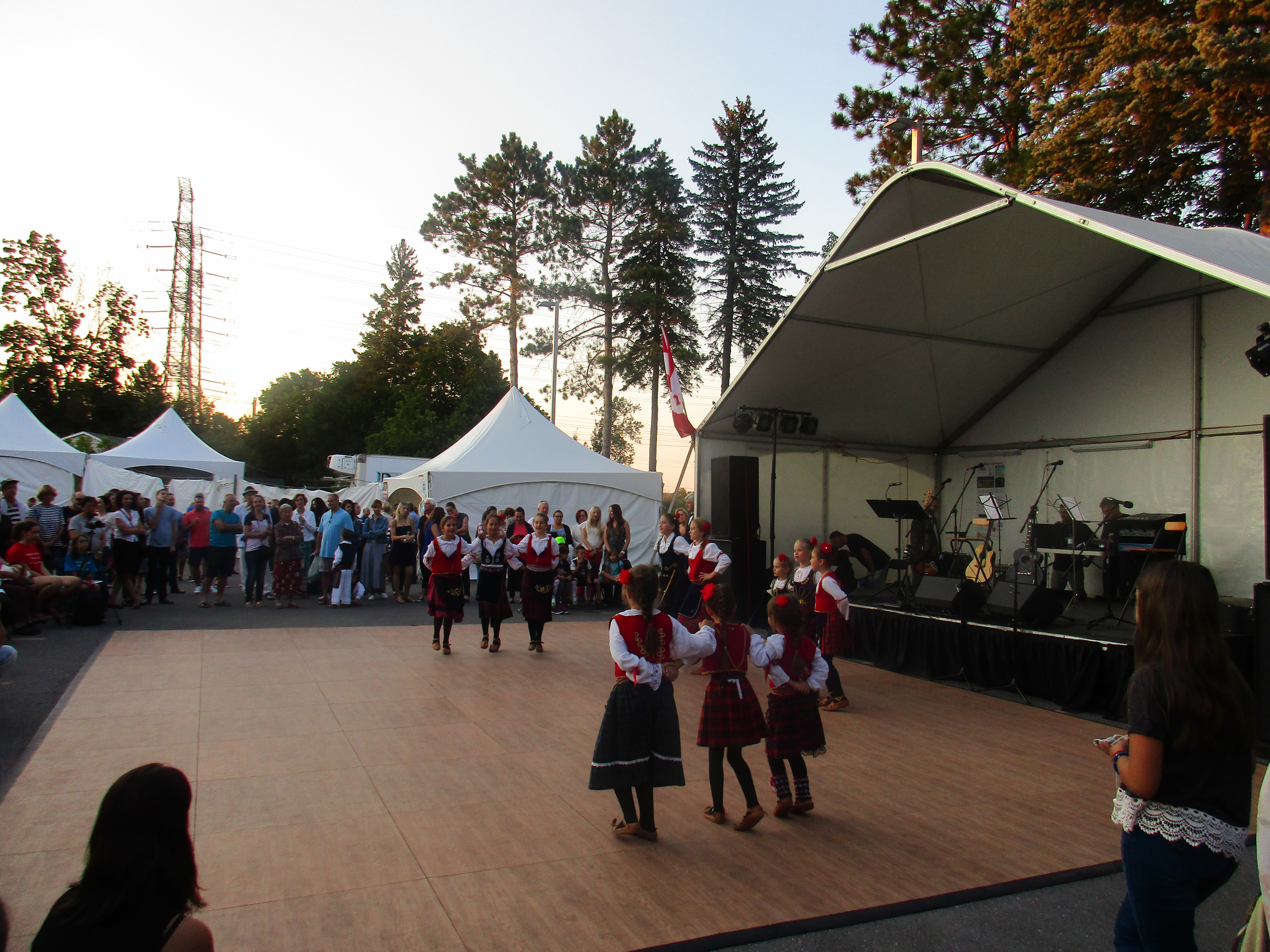
Folk-dance group at the Serbian Festival in Ottawa, 2016

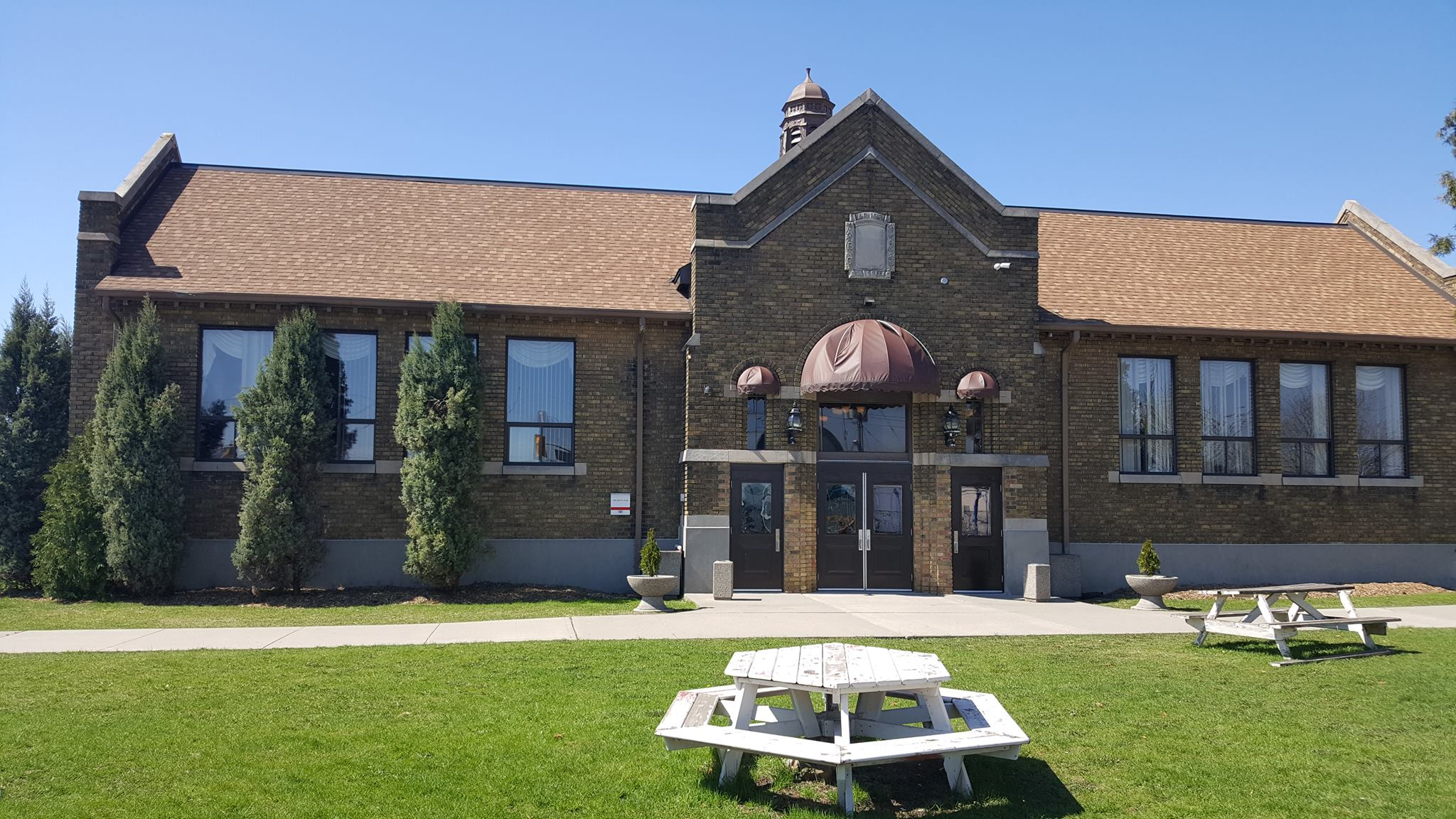
Serbian Centre in Mississauga

In 1954, the Serb Youth Club in Toronto was founded and its folk-dance group Stražilovo became one of the first folk dance groups in Canada.

Toronto's folk-dance group Hajduk Veljko (founded in 1964) danced at the 1976 Montreal Olympics and at the Expo 86 in Vancouver.

From the early 1950s to 1984 the Serbian Cultural Club "Saint Sava" was active in Toronto, publishing eight volumes about Serb history.

In 1968, the Saint Michael the Archangel Serbian Orthodox Church hosted the "Belgrade" pavilion of the Toronto Caravan cultural festival, which displayed many Serbian cultural artifacts, showcased kolo dancing and other performance arts, and presented Toronto residents Serbian delicacies. The annual festival ran for over 30 years, winning, in 2001, the Zena Kossar "Best Pavilion Award".

The Serbian Heritage Academy of Canada, founded in Toronto in 1981, has organized academic conferences, exhibits, and lectures. In 1984 it installed a bronze plaque at the University of Toronto's Medical Sciences Building honouring Canadian doctors and nurses who had worked as volunteers in Serbia during the World War I.

The Serbian Cultural Association Oplenac was founded in 1987 in Mississauga. Serbian folk dancing has been a major activity in SCA Oplenac since its inception and itvis claimed to be the biggest Serbian folklore group in North America. All proceeds from its events go to the preservation and presentation of Serbian culture and traditions in Canada. In 2012, the company consisted of 8 large ensembles, a choir, an orchestra as well as a large recreational ensemble. It established a drama school for children that performs theatre plays in Serbian, as well as a Serbian-language school.

Serbian Theatre Toronto was established in 2004 and is the oldest Serbian theatre in Canada and North America. In more than two decades of activity, the theatre has produced more than twenty plays by Serbian writers and has performed in many cities in Canada and the United States.

Established in 2008, Toronto's Puls teatar ("Pulse Theatre") is the biggest drama club and theatre for children in Serbian in Canada.

There are severial Serbian media in Canada such as the Serbian Toronto Television, a weekly 30-minute current affairs Serbian television show that is filmed throughout various locations across Canada and airs on multicultural channel Omni Television, and Novine Toronto, a newspaper.

Serbian White Eagles FC is a Canadian semi-professional soccer team, a member of the Canadian Soccer League.

== Heritage ==
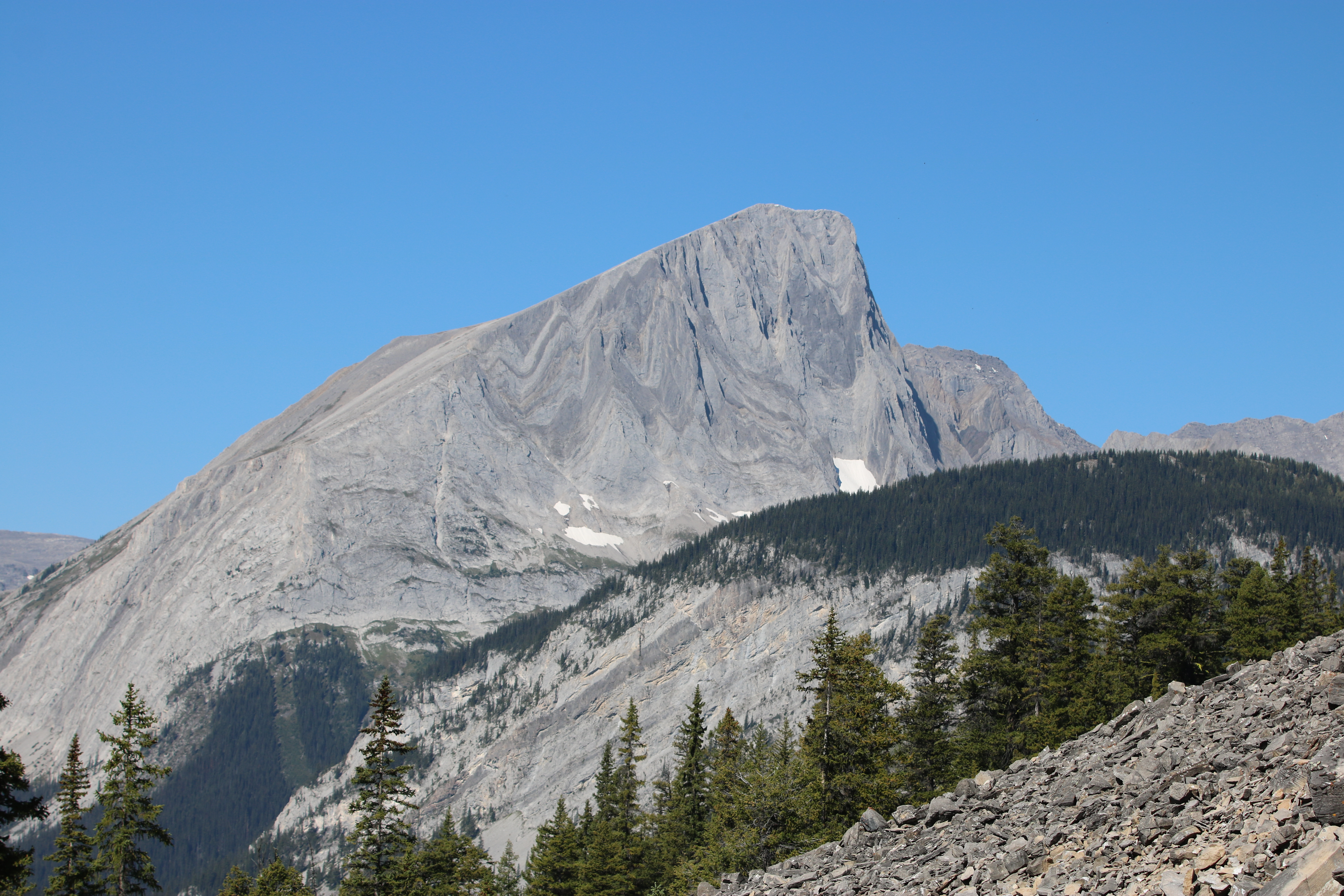
Mount Putnik in Peter Lougheed Provincial Park in Alberta, named after the World War I Serbian General Radomir Putnik

In 1991, a non-profit senior citizens apartment building in Windsor, Ontario, was named General Mihailovich Place in commemoration of saving the lives of hundreds of MIA airmen (including Canadians) who were forced to parachute after their bombers sustained damage from Nazi groundfire over Serbia.

In 2004, at an unveiling by Toronto City Councillors Joe Mihevc and Howard Moscoe, a street in Toronto, located north of Eglinton Avenue and west of Marlee Avenue, was renamed Beograd Gardens to honour Serbian capital Belgrade.

Mount Putnik in Peter Lougheed Provincial Park in Alberta, was named after the World War I Serbian General Radomir Putnik. In 2012, the Ravna Gora Serbian Heritage Society of Calgary unveiled on the mountain a plaque to commemorate him.

In 2016, a boulevard in Hamilton was named after Serb inventor Nikola Tesla.

== Notable people ==
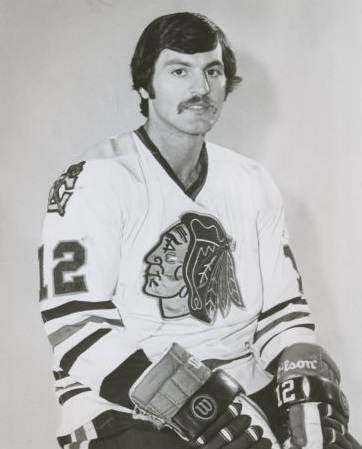
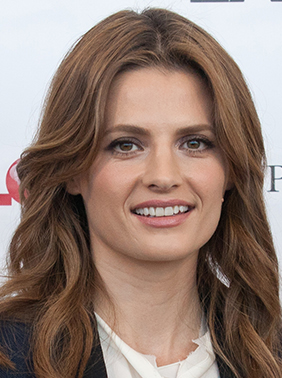
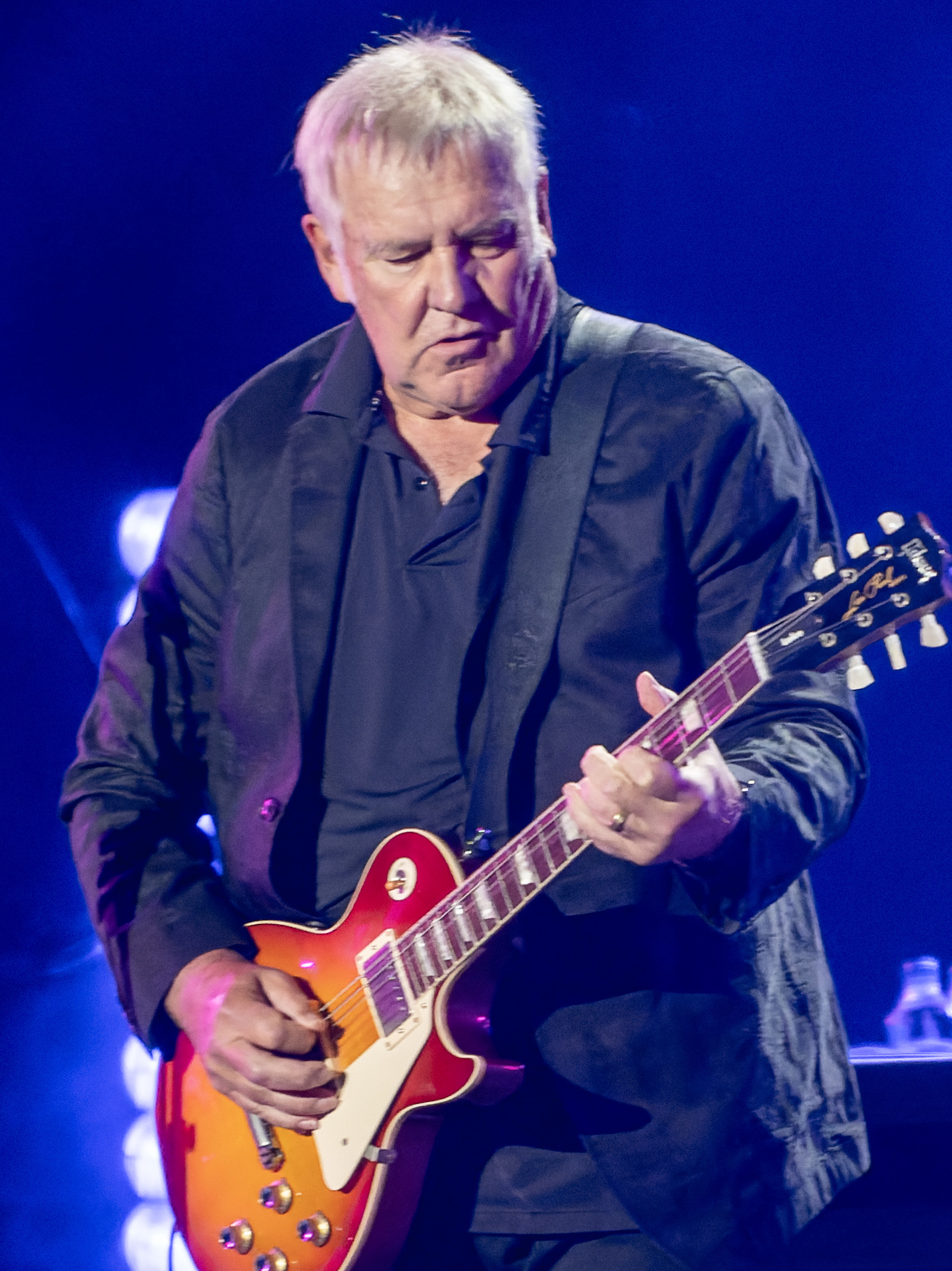
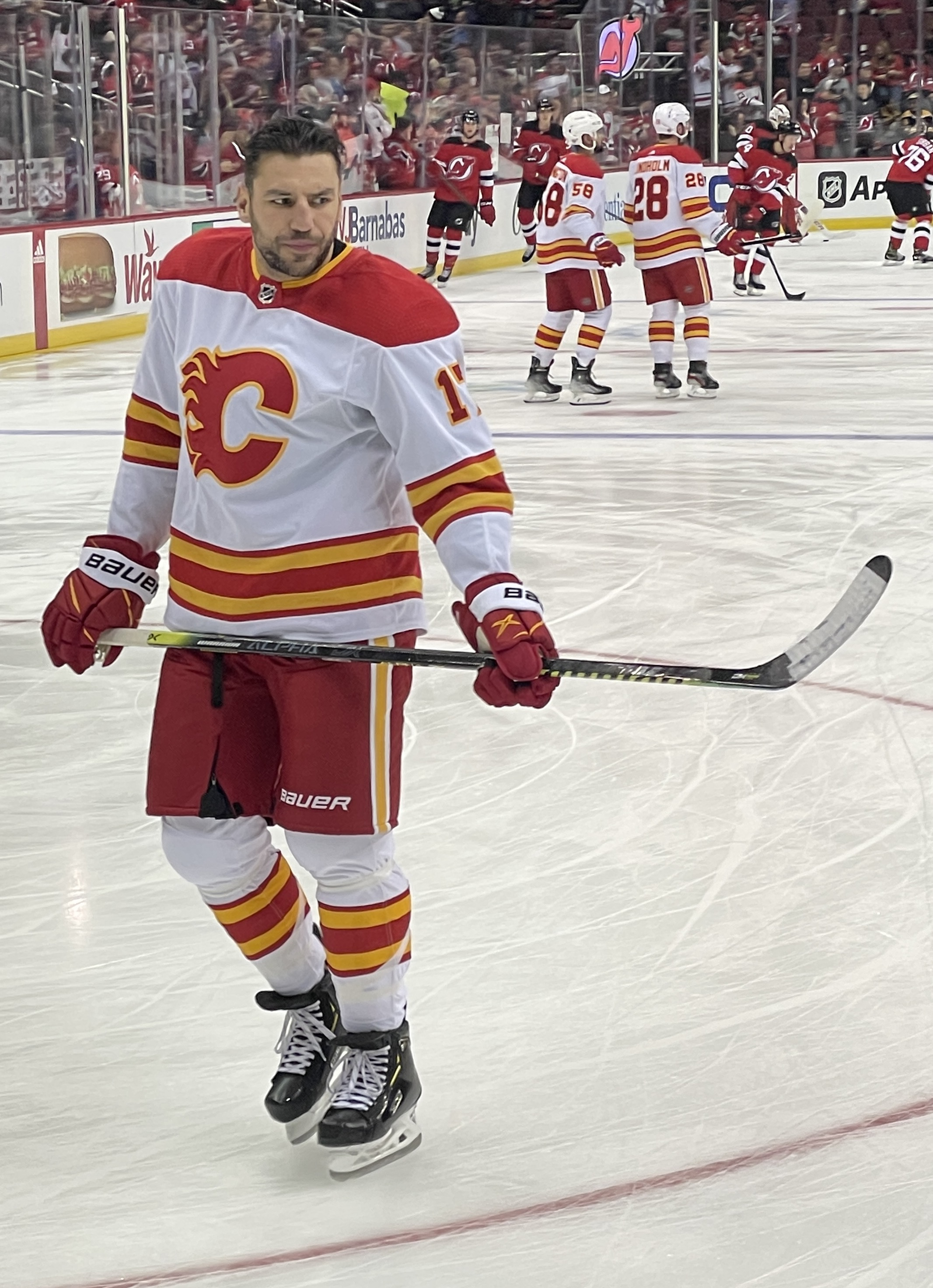
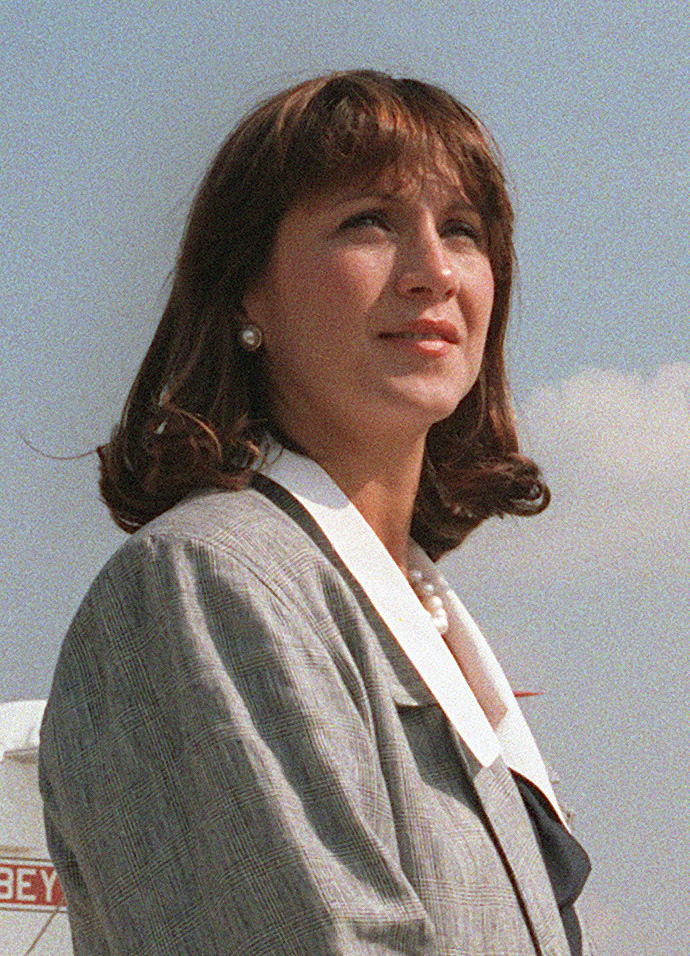
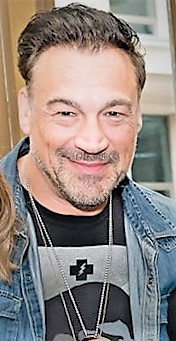
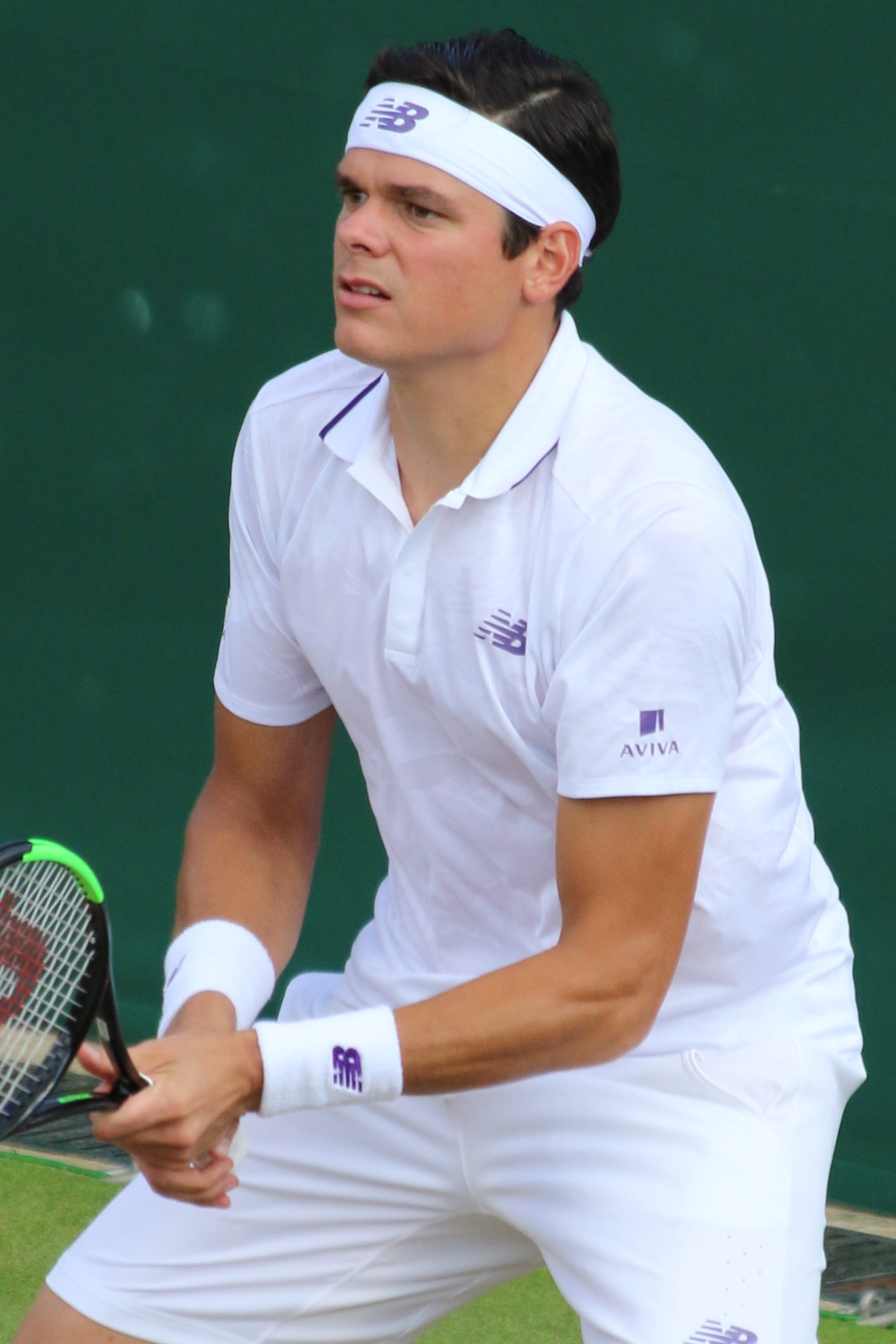
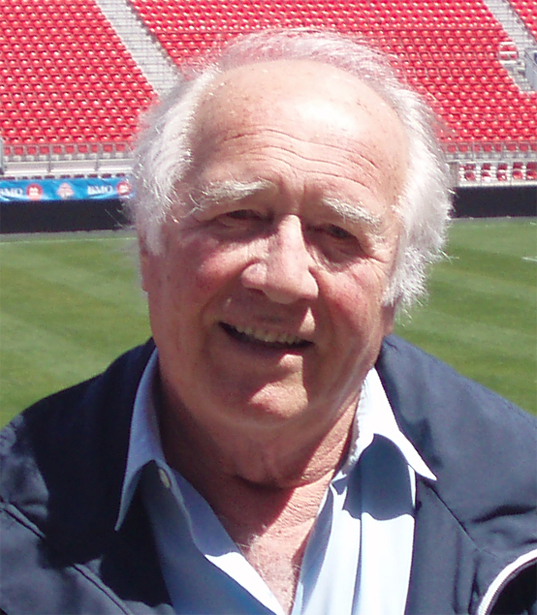
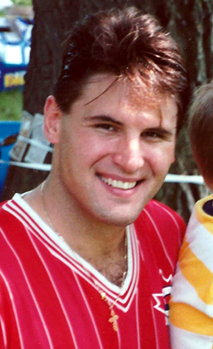
Ivan Boldirev	Stana Katic	Alex Lifeson	Milan Lucic	Mila Mulroney	Aleks Paunovic	Milos Raonic	Boris Spremo	Peter Zezel

- Ivan Boldirev – ice hockey player
- Milan Borjan – soccer player
- Bob Bratina – politician
- Bob O'Billovich – football player, coach, and executive
- Lolita Davidovich – actress
- Philippe Djokic – violinist, conductor
- Mike Dopud – actor
- Nikola Kalinic – football player
- Stana Katic – actress
- Nina Kiri – actress
- Ned Kuruc – politician
- Stefan Jankovic – basketball player
- Alex Lifeson – musician
- Milan Lucic – ice hockey player
- Rebecca MacDonald – businesswoman
- Scott Milanovich – football coach
- Alex Mihailovich – journalist
- Viktor Mitic – artist
- Mila Mulroney – spouse of the 18th prime minister of Canada, Brian Mulroney
- Alex Nedeljkovic – ice hockey player
- Daniel Nestor – tennis player
- Anica Nonveiller – journalist
- Lilly Otasevic – sculptor
- Dan Petronijevic – actor
- Alex Petrovic – ice hockey player
- Adrien Plavsic – ice hockey player
- Tom Rakocevic – politician
- Milos Raonic – tennis player
- Boris Spremo – photographer
- Mick Vukota – ice hockey player
- Daniel Vukovic – ice hockey player
- Black Mike Winage – miner
- Peter Zezel – ice hockey player

== See also ==
- Immigration to Canada
- European Canadians
- Serb diaspora
- Canada–Serbia relations
- Serbian Orthodox Eparchy of Canada

== Sources ==
- Vuković, Sava (1998). History of the Serbian Orthodox Church in America and Canada 1891–1941. Kragujevac: Kalenić.
- Tomović, Vladislav A. (2002). Canadian Serbs: A History of Their Social and Cultural Traditions (1856-2002). Batlik. ISBN 978-0-92064-240-5.
- Powell, John (2005). Encyclopedia of North American Immigration. Infobase Publishing. ISBN 9781438110127.
- Mandres, Marinel (2020). "An Unprecedented Dichotomy: Impacts and Consequences of Serbian Internment in Canada during the Great War". In Hinther, Rhonda L.; Mochoruk, Jim (eds.). Civilian Internment in Canada: Histories and Legacies. University of Manitoba Press. pp. 99–114. ISBN 978-0-88755-845-0.
