= Milan Vukadinov =

Serbian-Canadian chess player

Milan Vukadinov (Serbian Cyrillic: Милан Вукадинов; 1936–2002) was a Serbian-Canadian chess player who represented Canada at the 24th Chess Olympiad in Valletta, Malta. Canada came eight to ninth place in the field of 81 countries competing for the world chess championship. In the final results, Russia took gold, Hungary silver and Yugoslavia bronze medals.

== Biography ==
Vukadinov was born on 22 of September 1936 in Чента (Čenta), Банат (Banat), Војводина (Vojvodina), which was part of Yugoslavia at the time. Milan comes from a family of 7 siblings and he had a twin sister called Milana. Milan Vukadinov first learned to play chess from his Serbian father at the age of nine in his hometown in Чента, Banat, Serbia. However, he did not participate in a tournament until age 20. He attended the University of Belgrade, where he studied law while working as a security guard part-time. Following this, he moved to Germany. In 1965, Vukadinov emigrated to Canada. He received a Master's degree from the University of Waterloo in 1971.

In Canada, Vukadinov began participating in the Windsor Chess Club. He was known primarily as a chess coach. An early tournament result had him finish in second place at the Ontario Open in 1967. In London, he played 74 people in a simultaneous exhibition, winning 72 games. In 1980, he represented Canada at the 24th Chess Olympiad in Valletta, Malta, where the team set a record for the best Canadian Chess Olympiad results, with eighth to ninth place out of 81.

At his peak, Vukadinov had a Chess Federation of Canada rating of 2412, the eighth-highest Canadian rating. His United States Chess Federation rating peaked at 2455 and his FIDE rating 2232.

Vukadinov died of a brain tumor in Windsor on 13 November 2002.

== See also ==
- List of Serbian Canadians
- Serbian Canadians
