= Montenegrin Canadians =

Montenegrin Canadians Crnogorski Kanađani Црногорски Канађани
- (Canada) (Montenegro)

Total population
- 4,160 (2016 Census)

Regions with significant populations
- Ontario: 2,050
- British Columbia: 380
- Quebec: 360

Languages
- Canadian English · Canadian French · Montenegrin

Religion
- Eastern Orthodoxy and Sunni Islam

Related ethnic groups
- Montenegrin Americans, Yugoslav Americans other Slavic and European Americans

Montenegrin Canadians (Montenegrin: Kanadski Crnogorci) are Canadian citizens of Montenegrin descent or Montenegro-born people who reside in Canada. According to the 2011 Census, 2,970 Canadians claimed full or partial Montenegrin ancestry, compared to 2,370 in 2006.

== Religion ==
Montenegrin Canadian demography by religion
Religious group	2021 (Note: Religious breakdown proportions based on "Montenegrin" ethnic or cultural origin response on the 2021 census.)	
Religious group	Pop.	%
Christianity	2,635	61.14%
Irreligion	1,275	29.58%
Islam	385	8.93%
Other	10	0.23%
Total Montenegrin Canadian population	4,310	100%

Montenegrin Canadian demography by Christian sects
Religious group	2021	
Religious group	Pop.	%
Catholic	335	12.71%
Orthodox	1,980	75.14%
Protestant	115	4.36%
Other Christian	205	7.78%
Total Montenegrin Canadian christian population	2,635	100%

== See also ==
- Canada–Montenegro relations
- Immigration to Canada
- Montenegrin diaspora
- European Americans
- Montenegrin Americans
- European Canadians
- Serbian Canadians
- Yugoslav Canadians

== Notable people ==
- Milos Raonic - tennis player
- Johnathan Kovacevic - hockey player
