= Yugoslav Canadians =

Yugoslav Canadians Canadien yougoslave Jugoslavenski Kanađani Југословенски Канађани Jugoslovanski Kanadčani Југословенски Канаѓани
Total population
- 30,565; 0.08% of the total Canadian population (2021 Census)

Languages
- Canadian English, Canadian French, Serbo-Croatian, Macedonian, Slovene

Religion
- Christianity, Islam

Related ethnic groups
- Yugoslav Americans, European Canadians

Yugoslav Canadians are Canadians of full or partial Yugoslav ancestry. At the 2021 Census, the total number of Canadians whose origins lie in former Yugoslavia, majority of whom indicated specific ethnic origin, was 372,075 or about 1% of the total population.

On the same census, there were 30,565 people who specifically indicated Yugoslav or Yugoslav Canadian as their ethnic origin; a 37% decrease from the 2011 Census when their number was 48,320.

== History ==
Yugoslav Canadian Population History (Note: Statistic includes the total population with ethnic or national origins from the region that once comprised Yugoslavia.)
Year	Pop.	±%
1921	3,906	—
1931	16,174	+314.1%
1941	21,214	+31.2%
1951	21,404	+0.9%
1961	68,587	+220.4%
1971	104,955	+53.0%
1981	124,640	+18.8%
1986	167,125	+34.1%
1991	179,860	+7.6%
1996	248,425	+38.1%
2001	296,245	+19.2%
2006	346,805	+17.1%
2011	346,325	−0.1%
2016	386,340	+11.6%
2021	372,075	−3.7%
Source: Statistics Canada Note1: 1981 Canadian census did not include multiple ethnic origin responses, thus population is an undercount.

=== 19th century ===
The first Serbs to arrive in Canada came to British Columbia in the 1850s. Many of them came from the state of California in the United States, while others directly emigrated from the Balkans. They primarily originated from the Bay of Kotor and the Dalmatian coast which had similar climates as their destinations. The majority of these migrants came from territories controlled by Austria-Hungary for political and economic reasons, and only a small number came directly from Independent Serbia. Those who settled were typically young single men and employed in mining or forestry near such towns as Phoenix, Golden Prince Rupert and Kamloops.

The history of Bosnian arrivals to Canada dates back to as far as the 19th century.

Many thousands of Aegean Macedonians emigrated to Canada in the 1890s. They settled primarily in Ontario, especially Toronto. Many early Aegean Macedonian immigrants found industrial work in Toronto. Later migrants found work as factory in abattoirs and foundries. Chatham and Windsor attracted many Macedonian immigrants who worked along the railroads. Many later settled in Detroit, Michigan.

=== Early 20th century ===
In the first half of the 20th century, most of the Macedonians were largely classified as Bulgarians or Macedono-Bulgarians.

During the second wave of emigration, Serbs arrived in the prairies. In Saskatchewan, they took up farming. In Alberta, coal mining and road construction was a source of employment. Many Serbs worked on the construction of railway lines that now extend from Edmonton to the Pacific coast. Communities of Serbs emerged in Regina, Lethbridge, Edmonton and Calgary while significant populations formed in Atlin, British Columbia and Dawson, Yukon. In Ontario and Quebec, Serbs were drawn to work in the industry sector. By 1914, the Serbian community of the city of Hamilton, Ontario numbered around 1,000. Further Serb settlement was established in Niagara Falls, London, and Windsor. The first Serbian immigrants to the city of Toronto arrived in 1903; by 1914 there were more than 200 Serbs.

Many Macedonians emigrated to Canada as "pečalbari" (seasonal workers) in the early 20th century. Thousands of Macedonians emigrated to Canada after the failure of the Ilinden Uprising. Many early Macedonian immigrants found industrial work in Toronto, either as factory hands or labourers in abattoirs, or in iron and steel foundries. Many ended up running and owning restaurants, butchers and groceries. Macedonian entrepreneurs and their descendants eventually employed their numerical strength within the food service industry as a catapult into a variety of larger and more sophisticated ventures.

An internal 1910 census counted 1090 Macedonians in Toronto, who were principally from Florina (Lerin) and Kastoria (Kostur) then in Ottoman Empire. During the same year, they established the Sts. Cyril and Methody Macedono-Bulgarian Orthodox Church in Toronto. and that church published The First Bulgarian-English Pocket Dictionary in 1913. Prior to World War I, many arriving Serbs were variously categorized under related Balkan groups, making the exact number of Serb immigrants difficult to determine.

Until World War II, most people who today identify themselves as Macedonian Canadians claimed a Bulgarian ethnic identity and were recorded as part of the Bulgarian ethnic group. The term Macedonian was used as a geographic/regional term rather than an ethnic one. At that time the political organization by the Slavic immigrants from the region of Macedonia, the Macedonian Patriotic Organization, also promoted the idea of Macedonian Slavs being Bulgarians.

During the Great War, military-aged Serb males who hailed from Serbia or Montenegro were considered allies but those who were born in Austro-Hungarian territories were deemed enemy aliens by Canadian law, even though their sympathies tended to lie with the allied cause. The latter were restricted in their freedom of movements, had to wear special identity cards and had to identify themselves regularly at the police station. Several hundred were interned in prison camps throughout the country under terrible conditions. Physicist Mihajlo Pupin, Serbia's consul in New York during the war, and Antun Seferović, the honorary consul of Serbia in Montreal, advocated for the rights of the classified aliens and internees through diplomacy via the Srpska Narodna Odbrana u Kanadi (Serbian National League of Canada) which resulted in exemption, compensation and the release of many ethnic Serbs. Another advocate for the rights of Serbs of Austro-Hungarian origin was Serbian-born court interpreter Bud Protich, who enlisted in the Canadian Army and was wounded in action in 1917.

=== Mid 20th century ===
After 1921, all immigrants from Yugoslavia, including Serbs, were designated as "Yugoslavs". The interwar period saw a major increase in Serbian immigration to Canada. More than 30,000 Yugoslavs came to Canada between 1919 and 1939, including an estimated 10,000 Serbs. Many of these immigrants were single, working men who settled in the northern region of the province of Ontario.

After the Second World War, Serbian political émigrés who were opposed to the newly established Yugoslav communist government sought refuge in Canada. Many of these were POWs and laborers from Austria and Germany who refused to return to their homeland. They settled in cities such as Toronto, Sudbury and Hamilton.

In Canada, the first ethnic Croatian parish was established in Windsor in 1950. Soon, parishes were established in Toronto (1951), Hamilton (1958), Vancouver (1967), Winnipeg (1968). Today there are ethnic Croatian parishes and missions in seventeen cities in Canada. One of the most prominent Croatian Catholic parishes is the Queen of Peace Catholic Church in Norval, Ontario. The establishment of the parish began in 1976 when community members, under the guidance of the Franciscan Friars, gathered for one evening to discuss the necessity and logistics of creating a place of gathering and cultural and faith building and preservation for the large Croatian immigrant population. In May 1977, 160 acres of property were purchased by the organizing committee with the specific dedication to Croatian Catholics.

Between 1957 and 1971, some 23,000 Yugoslavs arrived in Canada, of whom 10-15% were Serbs. They established organizations, newspapers and cultural events.

=== Late 20th century ===
In the late 1980s, Yugoslavia's communist government was on the verge of collapse. Shortly after the breakup of Yugoslavia in 1991, a large group of Serbs moved to Canada, mostly to Southern Ontario. This was a major brain drain, with educated Serbs fleeing serious economic problems and an undemocratic government. Other Serbs who came during the 1990s were refugees who fled the various civil wars in Yugoslavia.

The traditional centers of residence and culture for Bosnian Canadians are located in Toronto, Montreal, Edmonton and Calgary. The majority of Bosnian Canadians emigrated to Canada as refugees during and after the Bosnian War, which lasted from 1992 to 1995.

Serbian Canadians protested the NATO bombing of Yugoslavia which lasted from March 24 to June 10, 1999.

== Demography ==
=== National and ethnic origins ===
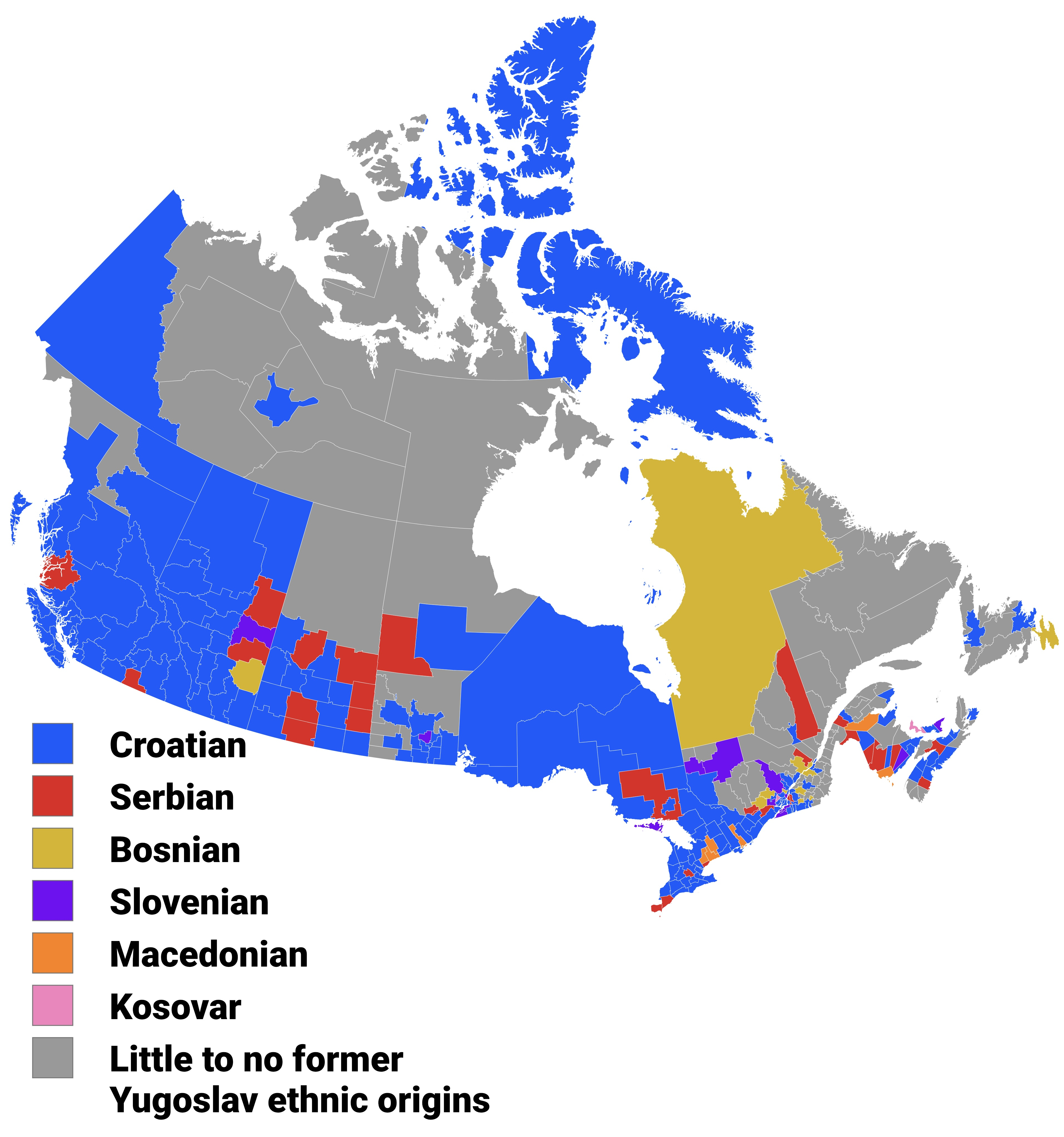
Largest former Yugoslav ethnic origin by census division, per the 2021 census

In 2021, the total number of Canadians whose origins lie in former Yugoslavia, majority of whom indicated specific ethnic origin was 372,075.

Demography of Yugoslav Canadians by ethnic & national origins (1996–2021)
Ethnic group	2021 Canadian census		2016 Canadian census		2011 Canadian census		2006 Canadian census		2001 Canadian census		1996 Canadian census	
Ethnic group	Pop.	%	Pop.	%	Pop.	%	Pop.	%	Pop.	%	Pop.	%
(Croatia) Croatian Canadians	130,820	35.2%	133,970	34.7%	114,880	33.2%	110,880	32%	97,050	32.8%	84,495	34%
(Serbia) Serbian Canadians	93,355	25.1%	96,535	25%	80,320	23.2%	72,690	21%	55,540	18.7%	40,200	16.2%
(Slovenia) Slovene Canadians	38,595	10.4%	40,475	10.5%	37,170	10.7%	35,940	10.4%	28,910	9.8%	25,875	10.4%
(North Macedonia) Macedonian Canadians	39,440	10.6%	43,105	11.2%	36,985	10.7%	37,050	10.7%	31,265	10.6%	30,915	12.4%
(Socialist Federal Republic of Yugoslavia) Yugoslav, n.o.s.	30,565	8.21%	38,480	10%	48,320	14%	65,305	18.8%	65,505	22.1%	66,940	26.9%
(Bosnia and Herzegovina) Bosnian Canadians	31,260 (Note: "Bosnian": 28,490 responses "Bosniak": 2,775 responses)	8.4%	26,740	6.92%	22,920	6.62%	21,040	6.07%	15,720	5.31%	8,975	3.61%
(Montenegro) Montenegrin Canadians	4,310	1.16%	4,165	1.08%	2,970	0.86%	2,370	0.68%	1,055	0.36%	—N/a	—N/a
(Kosovo) Kosovar Canadians (Note: Kosovar Canadians are likely to identify as Albanian Canadians instead, as Kosovars are ethnic Albanians.)	3,730	1%	2,870	0.74%	2,760	0.8%	1,530	0.44%	1,200	0.41%	—N/a	—N/a
Total population	372,075	100%	386,340	100%	346,325	100%	346,805	100%	296,245	100%	248,425	100%

== Geographical distribution ==
Ethnic & national origins of Yugoslav Canadians by province/territory (2021 census)
Province/territory	Yugoslav total		Croatian		Serbian		Macedonian		Slovenian		Bosnian		Yugoslavian, n.o.s.		Montenegrin		Kosovar	
Province/territory	Pop.	%	Pop.	%	Pop.	%	Pop.	%	Pop.	%	Pop.	%	Pop.	%	Pop.	%	Pop.	%
ON	242,605	1.73%	79,240	0.56%	64,415	0.46%	35,925	0.26%	25,080	0.18%	16,885	0.12%	16,400	0.12%	2,650	0.02%	2,010	0.01%
BC	53,715	1.09%	23,750	0.48%	12,660	0.26%	1,240	0.03%	5,340	0.11%	3,990	0.08%	5,585	0.11%	700	0.01%	450	0.01%
AB	35,065	0.84%	13,720	0.33%	7,415	0.18%	925	0.02%	3,860	0.09%	4,390	0.11%	4,085	0.1%	300	0.01%	370	0.01%
QC	22,195	0.27%	6,795	0.08%	5,355	0.06%	680	0.01%	2,390	0.03%	3,780	0.05%	2,315	0.03%	435	0.01%	445	0.01%
MB	7,810	0.6%	3,080	0.24%	1,335	0.1%	260	0.02%	990	0.08%	1,095	0.08%	860	0.07%	75	0.01%	115	0.01%
SK	5,815	0.53%	2,460	0.22%	1,325	0.12%	95	0.01%	485	0.04%	600	0.05%	745	0.07%	50	0%	55	0%
NS	2,565	0.27%	1,000	0.1%	430	0.04%	140	0.01%	225	0.02%	295	0.03%	315	0.03%	35	0%	125	0.01%
NB	1,125	0.15%	365	0.05%	280	0.04%	130	0.02%	80	0.01%	115	0.02%	125	0.02%	20	0%	10	0%
PE	460	0.31%	130	0.09%	55	0.04%	20	0.01%	55	0.04%	30	0.02%	25	0.02%	0	0%	145	0.1%
NL	305	0.06%	105	0.02%	50	0.01%	0	0%	25	0%	65	0.01%	60	0.01%	0	0%	0	0%
YT	240	0.61%	130	0.33%	25	0.06%	20	0.05%	30	0.08%	0	0%	35	0.09%	0	0%	0	0%
NT	80	0.2%	30	0.07%	15	0.04%	10	0.02%	10	0.02%	0	0%	15	0.04%	0	0%	0	0%
NU	40	0.11%	20	0.05%	0	0%	0	0%	10	0.03%	0	0%	10	0.03%	0	0%	0	0%
Canada	372,075	1.02%	130,820	0.36%	93,355	0.26%	39,440	0.11%	38,595	0.11%	31,260	0.09%	30,565	0.08%	4,310	0.01%	3,730	0.01%

== See also ==
- Canada–Yugoslavia relations
- Bosnian Canadians
- Croatian Canadians
- Macedonian Canadians
- Montenegrin Canadians
- Serbian Canadians
- Slovene Canadians

== Sources ==
- Mandres, Marinel (2020). "An Unprecedented Dichotomy: Impacts and Consequences of Serbian Internment in Canada during the Great War". In Hinther, Rhonda L.; Mochoruk, Jim (eds.). Civilian Internment in Canada: Histories and Legacies. University of Manitoba Press. pp. 99–114. ISBN 978-0-88755-845-0.
- Powell, John (2005). Encyclopedia of North American Immigration. Infobase Publishing. ISBN 9781438110127.
- Tomović, Vladislav A. (2002). Canadian Serbs: A History of Their Social and Cultural Traditions (1856-2002). Batlik. ISBN 978-0-92064-240-5.
- Vuković, Sava (1998). History of the Serbian Orthodox Church in America and Canada 1891–1941. Kragujevac: Kalenić.
