= Yugoslav Americans =

Americans of Yugoslav descent

Yugoslav Americans Jugoslavenski Amerikanci Југословенски Американци Jugoslovanski Američani
Total population
- 178,286 (2025)

Languages
- American English, Serbo-Croatian, Macedonian, Slovene; Albanian (to a lesser extent)

Religion
- Christianity (majority), Islam (minority)

Related ethnic groups
- Yugoslav Canadians, European Americans

Yugoslav Americans are Americans of full or partial Yugoslav ancestry. In the 2021 American Community Survey, there were 210,395 people who indicated Yugoslav or Yugoslav American as their ethnic origin; a steep and steady decrease from previous censuses (233,325 in 2019; 276,360 in 2016) and nearly a 36% decrease from the 2000 Census when there were over 328,000.

The total number of Americans whose origins lie in former Yugoslavia is unknown due to conflicting definitions and identifications; in descending order these were as per 2021 American Community Survey:

Ethnic group	Number
(Croatia) Croatian Americans	398,101
(Socialist Federal Republic of Yugoslavia) Yugoslav Americans	210,395
(Serbia) Serbian Americans	193,844
(Slovenia) Slovene Americans	162,172
(Bosnia and Herzegovina) Bosnian Americans	125,793
(North Macedonia) Macedonian Americans	66,070
(Montenegro) Montenegrin Americans	Unknown
(Kosovo) Kosovar Americans (Note: Kosovar Americans are likely to identify as simply Albanian Americans instead, as the majority of Kosovar Americans are ethnic Albanians.)	Unknown

== History ==
During the interwar period sizable Yugoslav immigrant community in the United States of some 760,000 individuals was sometimes colloquially called Yugoslavia’s “Tenth Banovina” while the city of Pittsburgh was described as the Yugoslav fourth-largest city.

== See also ==
- United States–Yugoslavia relations
