= Paul von Baich =

Canadian portrait and wildlife photographer

Paul von Baich was a Canadian portrait and wildlife photographer who traveled throughout Canada documenting the life of Canadians and Northern Native people from coast to coast, including landscape and wildlife.

Of Serbian and Austrian parents, von Baich was born in Graz, Austria, in 1934 and moved to Canada with his widowed mother in the early 1950s. As a freelance photographer he worked on photo-shoots of well-known film and television celebrities for the Public Relations department of the Canadian Broadcasting Corporation and the National Film Board of Canada in Montreal during the 1960s and the 1970s. He also traveled to the Arctic on photo assignments for the Canadian Museum of Civilization's "Nuvisavik: The Place Where We Weave"; Indian and Northern Affairs Canada for "The Story of Canada"; Reader's Digest Association (Canada)'s "Handpicked Tours of North America" and Canadian National Library of Canada.

He published several books with other photographers and journalists, namely "Natural History" with Bob Skovbo (1972); "British Columbia: Photographs by Paul von Baich" (1979); "Quebec and The St. Lawrence" with John de Visser; "The Old Kingston Road" (Oxford University Press, 1981); "Light in the Wilderness"; "Arctic Landscapes and Traditions" by David F. Pelly; "Canada: A Landscape Portrait" by J. A. Kraulis (1982); "Canada" by Ernest Boyce Inglis (1990); "Salt and Braided Bread: Ukrainian Life in Canada" by Jars Balan (1984).

He last lived with his wife in British Columbia.
