= Veljko Lalich =

Serbian-Canadian historian (1920–2008)

Veljko Lalich also spelled Veljko Lalić (Serbian Cyrillic: Вељко Лалић; Belgrade, Serbia, Kingdom of Serbs, Croats and Slovenes, 12 July 1920 – Fort Lauderdale, Broward County, Florida, United States, 13 November 2008) was a Serbian Canadian historian, and scholar who popularized the Russian language and Slavic Studies in Canada during the Cold War period until the dissolution of the Soviet Union.

He contributed greatly to the advancement of Slavic Studies, such as Slavic philology, literature, and civilization. He also directed with great dedication a substantial number of master's degrees and doctorate thesis at the Centre for Slavic Studies at the University of Montreal. In addition, he taught for several years the subjects of his specialization – Slavic languages, literature, history, and culture.

== Biography ==
Lalich, after World War II, escaped from Yugoslavia and emigrated to Canada as a political refugee with an undergraduate degree in political sciences and languages from his homeland. Lalich pursued his post-graduate studies in Canada and obtained a master's degree at the University of Montreal in 1953 and two years later he received a doctorate after successfully defending his thesis "Illyrian Movement: Its History and Ideology".

At the same time, he was appointed Assistant and Research Attaché in the Department of Slavonic Studies at his Alma Mater in 1954–1955. There Lalich assisted Dr. Theodore F. Domaradzki, director of the centre for Slavic Studies, in further developing the department's graduate school and contributing papers to learned societies. Lalich initiated the translation of all titles of books and articles in English and the elaborate subject guides in English permitted a researcher who had little or no command of Russian or East European languages to identify easily the material important to him or her. Initially, the courses at the University of Montreal's Department of Slavic Studies were organized by the Ignacy Jan Paderewski Foundation of New York City. Wacław Babiński headed the new department, however, after his death in 1957 Veljko Lalich succeeded him.

By 1958, according to Lalich: "There were more students enrolled in the Russian course than any other language courses the university offered except French and English". Many students that enrolled aspired to make a career in the foreign service.

The University of Montreal was the only university in Canada where students can enroll after high school graduation and pursue studies of Slavic language and culture through to a Ph.D.

Lalich was a member of the internationally known Canadian Association of Slavists.
