= Anica Nonveiller =

Serbian Canadian journalist (born 1957)

Anica Lazin Nonveiller (Serbian Cyrillic: Аница Лазин Нонвеје; born 1957) is a Serbian Canadian journalist, writer and producer. She is the sister of a Parisian theatre director Miloš Lazin. In 1991 she was fired from a state-owned Radio Belgrade for broadcasting a Croatian war song during the Yugoslav wars. After receiving death threats in 1992 she took refuge in France and latter moved with her family to Canada. Since 1996 she published political articles, essays and Tisza an autobiographical novel. She's the founder and director of the production house Aria that produces plays in Montreal that incorporates theatre, classical singing and political engagement.

== Life ==
Anica Lazin was born in Kikinda and raised in Belgrade by a half-German mother, Rakila Blat, and a Serbian agronomist David Lazin. Under Josip Broz Tito's regime, her father has spent two years in prison for political activism. She graduated in 1979 in classical singing and got a job as a musical director for Radio Belgrade. She won two prizes for radio dramas in 1985 on Marlene Dietrich and in 1987 on the anti-Stalinist Bulat Okudzhava, which was censored but gave her a large following in the Belgrade's underground culture.

In 1991 Lazin broadcast a Croatian war song "E, moj druže beogradski" (Oh, my Belgrade Comrade) by Jura Stublić and was suspended. After engaging in legal action and losing, she appeared on television, published articles in the oppositional newspaper, Borba, and joined the anti-war resistance in the early 1990s. In 1992, she was discovered to be on a "liquidation list" by an independent journalist and was given political asylum from French government. In December of that year she moved to Paris and Valognes with her mother and children and later with her husband to Montreal, Canada.

== Lyrical protest art ==
From 1997 to 2008, she directed a musical production house Aria that promoted rigorous Eastern European educational methods and political debate. The company re-adapted 19th century Opera classics by borrowing from their original literary inspiration in form of theatre dialogue and superimposing it with current events. The work on Bizet's Carmen (2004) was revisited by Mérimée's original text. Verdi's La traviata (2005) was restructured by going back to La Dame aux camélias by Alexandre Dumas, fils. Rigoletto (2007) was brought back to Le roi s'amuse by Victor Hugo.
