= Bosnian Canadians =

Bosnian Canadians Bosanski Kanađani
Total population
- 38,000 (est. 2016)

Regions with significant populations
- Ontario, Quebec, Alberta, British Columbia

Languages
- Majority: Canadian English, Minority: Canadian French, Serbo-Croatian

Religion
- Sunni Islam

Related ethnic groups
- Bosnian Americans, European Canadians

Bosnian Canadians (French: Canadiens d'origine Bosniaque) are Canadian citizens whose ancestry can be traced to Bosnia and Herzegovina.

According to the 2016 Canadian Census, there were over 38,000 people in Canada who identified as having Bosnian ancestry. In the 2011 Canadian census, 22,920 people stated that they are of Bosnian descent. The traditional centers of residence and culture for Bosnian Canadians are located in Toronto, Montreal, Edmonton and Calgary.

== History ==
The history of Bosnian arrivals to Canada, however, dates back to as far as the 19th century. The 1891 Canadian census recorded two individuals from Bosnia and Herzegovina living in Canada. The census records show that they were both men, working as laborers in Ontario.

=== World War I ===
During World War I, Canada, as part of the British Empire, declared war on the Central Powers, including Austria-Hungary, which then included Bosnia and Herzegovina. As a result, many Bosnians living in Canada at that time were considered enemy aliens and faced discrimination and internment.

According to historical records, there were a few Bosnians living in Canada at the time of World War I, but their numbers were relatively small. Some of them may have been classified as Austro-Hungarian or Yugoslavian immigrants, depending on the period of their arrival.

The most well-known case of Bosnians being interned in Canada during World War I is that of Mustafa Golubić and his brother Ibrahim, who were both interned in a camp in Kapuskasing, Ontario. Mustafa had arrived in Canada in 1912, and his brother Ibrahim had followed him a year later. When the war broke out, the Golubić brothers were arrested as enemy aliens and interned for the duration of the war.

=== World War II ===
While there were no specific Bosnian-Canadian military units during World War II, many Bosnian-Canadians served in the Canadian armed forces and contributed to the war effort. Some of them may have also been involved in resistance movements in Bosnia and Herzegovina against the Independent State of Croatia.

At the same time, Bosnian-Canadians also faced discrimination and suspicion during the war due to their origins, and some of them were even interned, similarly to what happened during World War I. For example, in 1940, over 100 Bosnian Muslim men were interned in a camp in Petawawa, Ontario, alongside other enemy "aliens".

After the war, a small number of Bosnian-Canadians who had fought with the Yugoslav Partisans against the NDH returned to Bosnia and Herzegovina to help rebuild the country. However, most Bosnian-Canadians remained in Canada and continued to build their lives there.

In addition to their military service, Bosnian-Canadians also contributed to the war effort in other ways. For example, some worked in factories that produced war materials, such as ammunition and aircraft parts. Others worked in agriculture, helping to produce food for Canadian troops and civilians.

Despite their contributions, some Bosnian-Canadians also faced discrimination and suspicion during the war due to their origins.

=== Cold War ===
After World War II, Canada opened its doors to many displaced persons and refugees from war-torn Europe, including Bosnia and Herzegovina. Between 1945 and 1950, approximately 3,000 Yugoslav refugees, including Bosnians, came to Canada as part of the government-assisted immigration program. Many settled in cities such as Toronto, Montreal, and Vancouver.

During the Cold War, tensions between the Western powers and the Soviet Union affected Bosnian-Canadians, as well as other immigrant communities in Canada. Some Bosnian-Canadians who had left Yugoslavia after the war were seen as potential spies or communist sympathizers by Canadian authorities, leading to surveillance and suspicion. The Cold War also affected the Bosnian diaspora in other ways, such as limiting travel and communication with relatives and friends in Yugoslavia.

As Bosnian-Canadians settled into their new home, they faced the challenge of preserving their cultural identity while adapting to Canadian society. This included maintaining their language, traditions, and religious practices, while also learning English and navigating Canadian institutions. Despite the challenges, Bosnian-Canadians worked to build their community in Canada. They established community organizations, cultural centers, and places of worship, such as mosques and churches. They also organized social and cultural events, such as festivals, dances, and sports tournaments.

=== Bosnian War ===
The Bosnian War, which took place from 1992 to 1995, was a significant event for Bosnian-Canadians, as many had friends and family members who were directly impacted by the conflict. The war also led to an increase in the number of Bosnian refugees coming to Canada, including many who settled in cities with existing Bosnian communities.

Canada played an active role in the Bosnian War through its participation in the United Nations Protection Force (UNPROFOR), which was tasked with monitoring the ceasefire and providing humanitarian aid to those affected by the conflict. Canadian soldiers served in Bosnia as part of the UNPROFOR mission, and some lost their lives in the line of duty.

Canada also provided support to Bosnian refugees, with the Canadian government launching a special program to accept 5,000 Bosnian refugees in 1993. This program was in addition to regular immigration programs and allowed many Bosnian-Canadians to reunite with family members who had been displaced by the war.

During the war, Bosnian-Canadians were active in raising awareness and funds for humanitarian aid to Bosnia and Herzegovina. They organized demonstrations, rallies, and fundraising events to support those affected by the conflict. The Bosnian-Canadian community also worked to provide support to refugees who arrived in Canada, helping them to find housing, employment, and access to social services.

=== Contemporary ===
Bosnian Canadians continue to be an active and vibrant community within Canada. According to the 2016 Canadian Census, there were over 38,000 people in Canada who identified as having Bosnian ancestry. The majority of these individuals are concentrated in urban centres such as Toronto, Vancouver, Edmonton and Calgary. Bosnian Canadians have made contributions to various fields, including education, business, and the arts. Many also actively engage in preserving and promoting their cultural heritage through events and organizations such as the Bosnian Canadian Cultural Association. In addition, the community maintains close ties to Bosnia and Herzegovina through regular visits and ongoing support for humanitarian and cultural initiatives in the country.

In addition to their contributions to Canadian society, Bosnian Canadians continue to maintain strong ties to their homeland. Many Bosnian Canadians support humanitarian efforts in Bosnia and Herzegovina, and some have even returned to the country to help rebuild and contribute to its development.

The largest Bosnian organisation in Canada is the Congress of North American Bosniaks.

== Religion ==
The Bosnian Islamic Association Gazi Husrev-beg (BIAGH) was originally established in November 1977 under the name Association of Islamic Community Gazi Husrev-beg. Since 1995, it has operated under its current name. The association was founded to meet the religious needs of its members, a mission supported by the appointment of a full-time imam who has continuously served the community since June 1982. In addition to its religious role, BIAGH also supports the cultural and social life of Bosniaks by preserving traditions, promoting folklore, encouraging sports, and organizing various creative workshops.

Bosnian Canadian demography by religion
Religious group	2021 (Note: Religious breakdown proportions based on "Bosnian" and « Bosniak » ethnic or cultural origin response on the 2021 census.)		2001 (Note: Religious breakdown proportions based on "Bosnian" ethnic or cultural origin response on the 2001 census.)	
Religious group	Pop.	%	Pop.	%
Christianity	9,700	31.03%	3,875	24.65%
Islam	9,980	31.93%	8,705	55.38%
Irreligion	11,395	36.45%	3,100	19.72%
Judaism	80	0.26%	25	0.16%
Buddhism	15	0.05%	10	0.06%
Hinduism	0	0%	10	0.06%
Indigenous spirituality	15	0.05%	—N/a	—N/a
Sikhism	0	0%	0	0%
Other	80	0.26%	0	0%
Total Bosnian Canadian population	31,260	100%	15,720	100%

Bosnian Canadian demography by Christian sects
Religious group	2021		2001	
Religious group	Pop.	%	Pop.	%
Catholic	4,530	46.7%	2,150	55.48%
Orthodox	4,075	42.01%	1,525	39.35%
Protestant	375	3.87%	80	2.06%
Other Christian	720	7.42%	120	3.1%
Total Bosnian Canadian christian population	9,700	100%	3,875	100%

== Notable Bosnian Canadians ==
- Asmir Begović, soccer player and Bosnia and Herzegovina international
- Blagoje Bratić, soccer player
- Zijad Delić, imam, activist, teacher, scholar and public speaker
- Ema Zajmović, poker player
- Merlin Dervisevic, director of Cruel and Unusual
- Igor Drljaca, film director
- Johnathan Kovacevic, hockey player
- Vladimir Kuljanin, basketball player
- Nemanja Mitrović, basketball player
- Mila Mulroney, wife of the 18th Prime Minister of Canada, Brian Mulroney
- Neven Pajkić, boxer
- Diego Kapelan, basketball player
- Admir Salihović, soccer player
- Goran Simić, poet
- Alija Solak, soccer player and Canadian international
- Nik Zoricic (1983–2012), skier
- Karmen Petrovic, karateka and professional wrestler.

== See also ==
- Immigration to Canada
- Yugoslav Canadians
