= Bratsa Bonifacho =

Canadian artist (1937–2024)

- Born: February 10, 1937; Belgrade, Kingdom of Yugoslavia
- Died: December 12, 2024 (aged 87); Vancouver, Canada
- Education: Belgrade University
- Known for: Painter
- Notable work: 4 x MCH (1980); Brabancon La (1992); La Vila Arson Presente (2002)
- Movement: Abstract

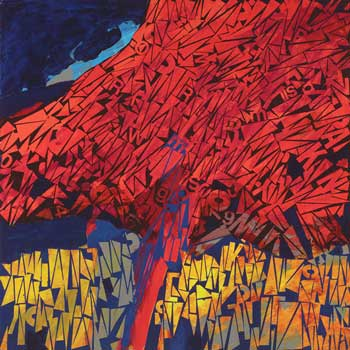
A painting by Bonifacho, Action at a Distance, 2019

Bratsa Bonifacho (Braca Bonifacije; February 10, 1937 – December 12, 2024) was a Canadian painter. He became a Canadian citizen in 1976 and lived in Vancouver, Canada. Working from a discipline based in formalism, he was an abstract expressionist who chose between many elements including symbolist and figurative to express non-verbal thoughts and emotions abstractly.

== Life and work ==
Bonifacho grew up in Belgrade during World War II's German occupation. He spoke Serbian, Russian, and English. Before settling in Vancouver, Canada in 1973 and becoming a Canadian citizen in 1976, he lived as a painter in France.

Utilizing techniques and relying on skills culled from over 25 years of training and 55 years practice in the arts, Bonifacho worked in the medium of oil which he applied to large squares and rectangles of prepared canvas. On occasion, he also used encaustic for its tactility and luminosity. Periodically, Bonifacho focused on qualities of geometry, surface, gesture, and sgraffito in metallic paints as a relief from working with prismatic colour. His work is represented by the Bau-Xi Gallery in Toronto and Vancouver (Canada), the Foster/White Gallery in Seattle and Conrad West Gallery, Las Vegas (US).

An accomplished musician and tap dancer, Bonifacho fell in love with jazz in the 1950s and studied at the School for Jazz (Dept. Of Drums) which was operated by the Belgrade Association of Jazz Musicians. After graduating, he was both leader and drummer for the Braca Bonfacije Dixie Quintet in Belgrade from 1957-1960.

Bonifacho died on December 12, 2024, at the age of 87.

== Education ==
- Sumatovacka School of Art, Belgrade (Drawing and Painting), 1959-1960
- Bachelor of Fine Arts (BFA) University of Belgrade, Faculty of Fine Arts, 1961-1964
- Bachelor of Architecture (B. Arch) University of Belgrade Faculty of Architecture, 1964-1967
- Atelier Kruger (Old Master printing techniques), Frankfurt Germany, summer seminars, 1966-1968
- Completion of one year course. School for Jazz (operated by the Belgrade Association of Jazz Musician) – Department of Drums, 1959

== Important themes ==
Bonifacho's earliest work dating from 1959-1963 was the politically motivated and intensely emotional "Eyes over Belgrade" series. He used roof tops and the exterior surfaces of buildings as massive canvases where he painted target-like pop designs critiquing war and the US and Russian space race while engendering ire in his neighbours. Even though Yugoslavia had pulled out of the Warsaw Pact in 1948 and Belgrade was as artistically progressive as London (for example, noted New York-based performance and fellow Serbian-born artist Marina Abramović was a member of Bonifacho's social and artistic milieu), it was under the rule of president-for-life, Josip Broz Tito. The themes of war, nuclear holocausts, environmental devastation, and human vulnerability have dominated much of Bonifacho's work, as noted in an article by social activist and author Christian Parenti in his comments about Bonifacho's 25-year retrospective show at Belgrade's Progress Gallery (Galerija Progres) in 2000.

The first paintings to gain Bonifacho critical acclaim in Canada were the Blackboards series produced between 1978 and 1982. The series features racing greyhounds, targets, pop culture symbols (e.g. Marilyn Monroe) and/or American flags in sometimes unexpected juxtapositions. They are a commentary on the "rat race, the arms race, and the space race," and human vulnerability.

Bonifacho also references sexuality both overt and covert, in the context of global bio-degradation, nuclear devastation, and anti-war themes.

Landscapes have played an important role in Bonifacho's work as more than just reference points for geography; Alberta Landscapes, his first series after immigrating to Canada, not only played a locative role but was also a means of coming to grips with memories of war-ravaged landscapes and environmental devastation and yearnings for imagined landscapes.

The Parallelograms series stands in sharp contrast as it is a meditative, minimalist series that is limited to gold and black while the greater body of Bonifacho's work is saturated with prismatic colour.

Always fascinated with language, Bonifacho's painting titles from the earliest days feature word play. He also mischievously embeds words from various languages in his paintings, daring the viewer to find and make sense of them. His Habitat Pixel series depicts computer viruses while referencing the alphabet, typography, and the printing press.

The city of Vancouver (Canada), Bonifacho's adopted home, honoured him by hanging six images chosen from his Habitat Pixel series on city banners that were displayed along major thoroughfares and bridges in 2008. He joined the company of such internationally renowned local artists as Jack Shadbolt, Toni Onley, Gordon A. Smith, and Bill Reid.

In what could be described as a 'tour de force', Bonifacho's 2013 series, Testament Papers, features five compositional styles integrating themes explored over several years. By constraining himself to a grid format and enclosing symbols, he freed himself to comment anew, both seriously and humorously, on pollution, war, sex, energy, politics, and more. Using symbols such as letters from the Romanized and Cyrillic alphabets, numbers, and drawing words from multiple languages (Hebrew, Italian, Serbian, Russian, French, German, Spanish, Latin, etc.) and the five styles used in this series, Testament Papers, is richly evocative of abstract art, expressionist painting, and symbolic representation. Taken as a whole, Testament Papers, is a workshop demonstration of an artist's consummate skill, intuition, passion, history, and infinite creative drive.
