= Black Mike Winage =

Serbian-Canadian miner, pioneer and adventurer

- 'Black Mike' Winage photographed for National Geographic in 1968
- Born: Mihajlo Vojnić; March 14, 1870; Serbia
- Died: March 15, 1977 (aged 107); Dawson City, Yukon, Canada
- Occupations: Prospector, pioneer, adventurer

Michael "Black Mike" Winage (14 March 1870 – 15 March 1977) was a Serbian Canadian miner, pioneer and adventurer who settled in the Yukon towards the end of the Klondike Gold Rush and who allegedly lived to be 107 years old.

== Biography ==
Born in the Principality of Serbia in 1870 as Mihajlo Vojnić (Serbian Cyrillic: Михајло Војнић), Winage reportedly left home at age 12, in 1882, for Canada. He claimed to have been a guide and to have traveled as far as Aklavik, as well as a Constable with the Royal Canadian Mounted Police.

By the time he arrived in the Yukon on 5 March 1900 with his dogs and horses, gold had been discovered elsewhere in Canada and Alaska, prompting a new stampede, this time away from the Klondike.

Although the Klondike Gold Rush was virtually over Winage began prospecting anyway. In the Yukon Winage was originally known as "Big Mike" because of his large size. After becoming a woodcutter he became known as "Sawdust Mike". After helping to unload 400 tons of coal in 1918 he finally became known as "Black Mike", a nickname which stuck with him for the rest of his life.

== Career ==
In 1961, when the Auditorium, a local theater in Dawson City, was being demolished, Winage saw an opportunity to make money by searching for the gold dust that had fallen from the prospectors and through the floorboards to the ground beneath:

While the last of the walls and fittings in the Auditorium were being torn down and removed, long-time resident Black Mike Winage could be seen idling around the site. One evening, when only the back and east walls remained, the floor torn up exposing the ground beneath, he spoke to a couple of young workers asking if there was one bar, or two. His money was on two, an old bet with no way to win until that summer's evening when, as he told the men, they could help prove him right by panning the dust and other debris fallen through the floorboards.

Encouraged by Black Mike, the men obtained the use of a rocker, a tin washtub, shovels and a length of water hose. Keeping their day jobs, they came back later to uncover their illicit mining operation still partly hidden by the remaining walls. The hose was attached to a water tap located at the side of the Dawson City Water & Power Company Limited, whose manager, M. Emma A. Seeley, made sure that every drop of water used was accounted for. Properly warned, the would-be miners were uneasy when anyone walked down the street, like myself, when I learned what they were doing and took photographs.

Two bars were found in the areas pointed out by Black Mike, one long and one short, their outlines drawn by gold. While Black Mike chortled at winning the long-standing bet, the successful miners shovelled, rocked and washed dirt and watched as nuggets and gold dust accumulated in a borrowed pan.

== Last years ==
In 1968, aged 98, Winage was included in a National Geographic article on 'The Canadian North', which reported he was still panning for gold in the hills. Claiming to have outlived three wives and all his friends, he spent the last 20 years of his life in MacDonald Lodge, a home for senior citizens, in Dawson City, Yukon Territory. He died the day after his 107th birthday.
