= Vesna Milosevic-Zdjelar =

Canadian astrophysicist

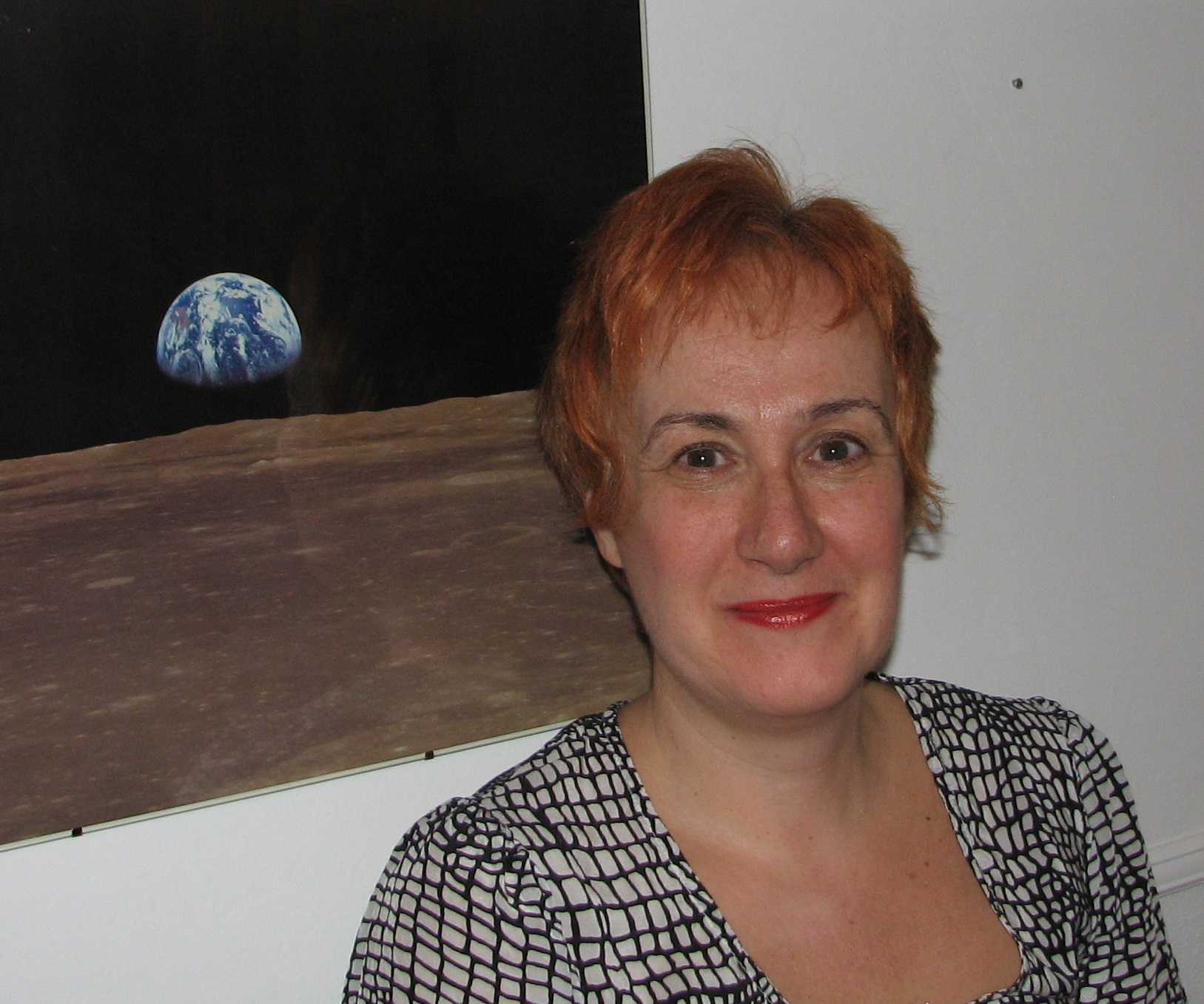
- Milosevic-Zdjelar in 2020
- Occupations: Science educator; astrophysicist; author
- Notable work: Astro Third Canadian Edition (Nelson Cengage 2020)
- Spouse: Nenad Zdjelar (1993–present)
- Website: www.uwinnipeg.ca/physics/people/vesna-milosevic-zdjelar.html

Vesna Milosevic-Zdjelar is a Serbian-born Canadian astrophysicist, science educator and author. Her specialty is teaching astrophysics to students enrolled in non-science programs at the University of Winnipeg.

== Early career ==
Prior to teaching in Winnipeg, Vesna Milosevic-Zdjelar was an astrophysicist at the Belgrade Observatory in Serbia. She immigrated to Canada in 1998 to escape the Nato bombing of her native country. Although her astrophysics qualifications were recognized by Canadian institutions, she decided to obtain a degree in science education as well. She began as a guest lecturer in physics at the University of Winnipeg before being hired full time. Her husband is Nenad Zdjelar, a professional musician who also graduated with a teaching degree in Canada.

== Career ==
Milosevic-Zdjelar teaches astronomy, concepts in science, and physics to non-science students at the University of Winnipeg. She lectures in the Physics department and joined the staff in 2000. Her area of expertise is Astrophysics and her research interests are galactic astronomy and astrophysical cosmology. She has published at least ten peer reviewed articles, one co-authored with Serbian astronomer Milan M. Ćirković. Her article on galactic haloes has appeared in the prestigious journal Monthly Notices of the Royal Astronomical Society. The Canadian Astronomical Society lists her as one of their experts, specializing in astrobiology.

Milosevic-Zdjelar co-authored Canada's first textbook on introductory astronomy, as part of the Astro learning series. In 2017, she spoke at the University of Winnipeg's TedX conference about overcoming our physical limitations in understanding the universe.

According to the University of Winnipeg, Milosevic-Zdjelar has contributed significantly in areas of science education, when applied to non-science students, as well as building community awareness through outreach programs. She is a coordinator of the local chapter of Let's Talk Science, a national award-winning organization which helps children and teens learn about science, technology, engineering and mathematics (STEM). She has visited schools in some of Winnipeg's poorest neighborhoods, introducing kids to scientific concepts. She wants her students to think beyond the confines of science class : “When you see the Earth from the International Space Station or you see it from the moon, there are no political boundaries. There’s nothing there – just us on a little pale blue dot, as Carl Sagan called it. We have to work together to keep it going.”
