= Lilly Otasevic =

Serbian Canadian artist based in Toronto (born 1969)

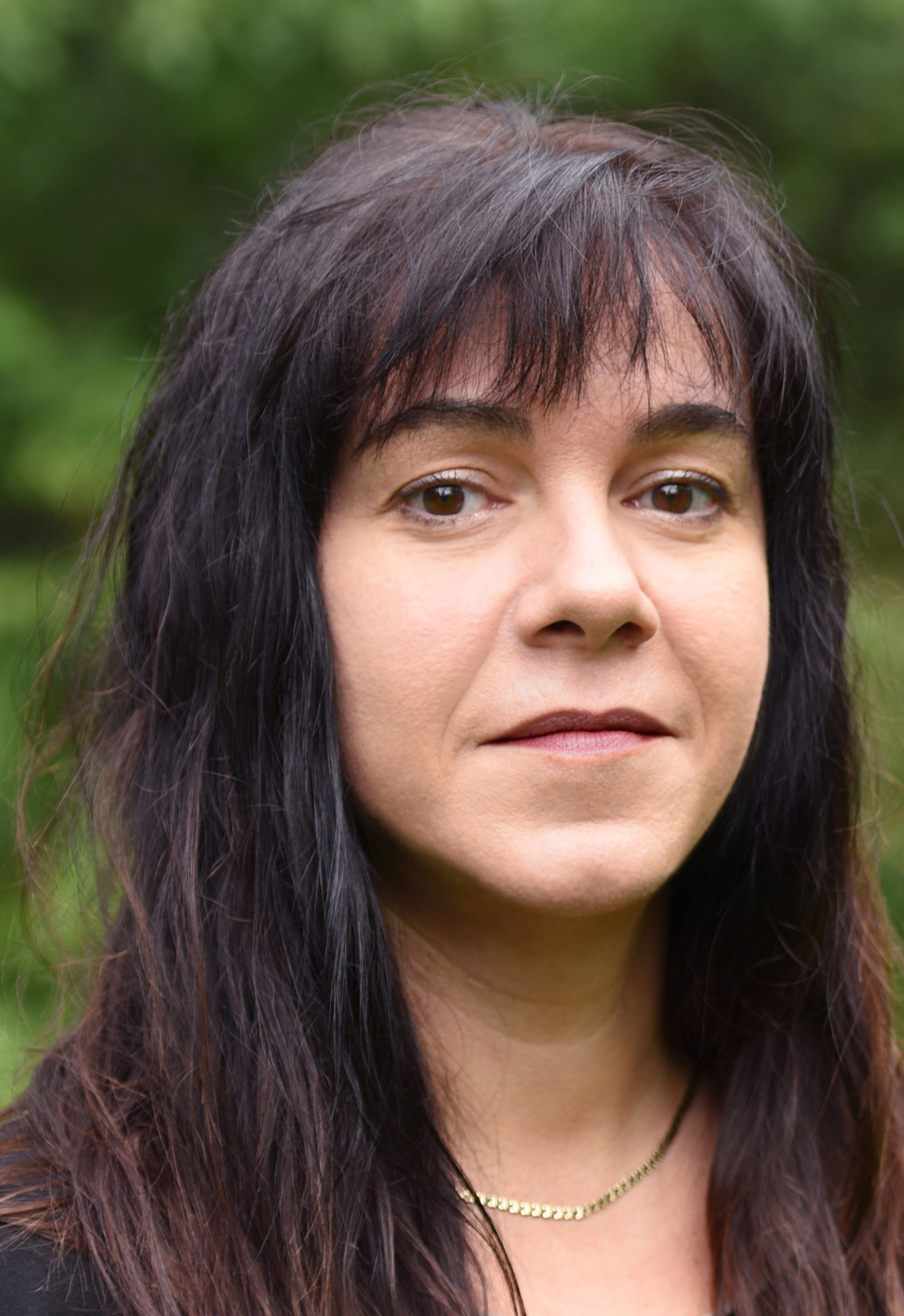
- Otasevic in 2014
- Born: Ljiljana Otašević; 1969 (age 56–57); Belgrade, SR Serbia, SFR Yugoslavia
- Education: University of Arts in Belgrade
- Occupations: Sculptor, designer

Lilly Otasevic (Serbian Cyrillic: Лили Оташевић, born 1969) is a Serbian Canadian artist based in Toronto, whose large-scale sculptural works have been commissioned by several local governments in Ontario, Canada. Ecological concepts are frequently incorporated into her sculptures and also determine the materials being used.

== Career ==
Although a trained painter, Otasevic's portfolio mainly consists of large-scale sculptures. She often focuses on environmental themes when designing public art works. Her "Mobius" monument has a looped shape which refers to the recycling logo, thereby underlining our relationship with nature. Molded from stainless steel, the sculptural work is found in downtown Toronto. Otasevic's "Break-Wave" bench proposal won the 2016, design competition held by the Design Exchange museum and Nespresso. Displayed at Toronto's Union Station, each bench has a curved shape that reflects the organic characteristics of coffee beans. The three benches are made of sustainable aluminum and come in separate colours.

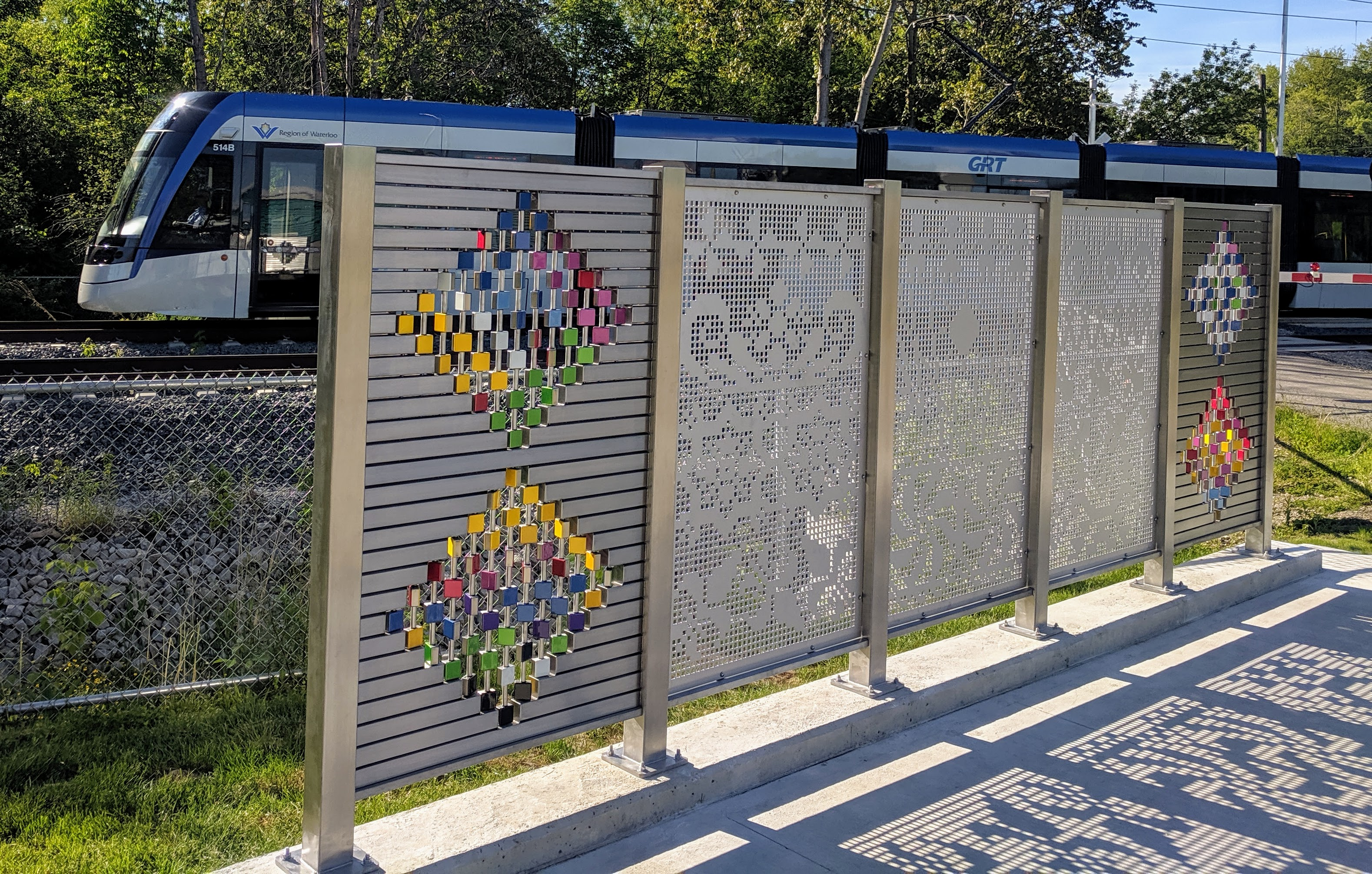
Fabric of Place

The public sculpture "Crescendo (Rising Wave)" was commissioned for Burlington's Aldershot Village and reflects both contemporary and historical themes. Its wave configuration refers to the nearby lake and the importance of water in the town's progress. According to Otasevic, the sculpture's "converging and diverging shape represents a hub of activity in the community." A recent commission includes a public art installation for the Ion rapid transit network in Waterloo. Lining a pedestrian walkway, "Fabric of Place" references handmade textiles and our connection to community, as well as celebrating diversity. Otasevic is a member of the Sculptors Society of Canada.

== Background and Exhibits ==
Born in Serbia, Otasevic grew up in a country that began relying on recycling practices in the early 1980s. Consequently, her art work has been influenced by environmental concerns. For example, she has used re-purposed bricks in her sculptural works. She studied design at the High School of Industrial Design in Belgrade and painting at the University of Arts in Belgrade. She left her native country and immigrated to Canada in 1994. She has exhibited in Canada, the US and the Middle East. In 2013, Otasevic had a solo show at the Canadian Sculpture Center, organized by the Sculptors Society of Canada. In 2010, she participated in a group exhibition at the John B. Aird Gallery, also organized by the Sculptors Society of Canada.
