= Nick Borkovich =

Canadian Superior court justice (1935–2017)

- Born: May 30, 1935
- Died: May 19, 2017 (aged 81)
- Occupation: Superior court justice
- Years active: 28 years

Nick Borkovich (May 30, 1935 – May 19, 2017) was a Canadian justice of the peace who retired from Hamilton's Ontario Superior Court of Justice in 2010.

== Career ==
Known for his fairness and common sense, Nick Borkovich was a Superior court justice in Ontario, who served on the bench for 28 years, starting in 1982. Along with three other judges, he jokingly became part of the "Slavic bench". Walter Stayshyn, Eugene Fedak and William Festeryga were of Ukrainian descent, whereas Borkovich was of Serbian heritage.

Borkovich attended McMaster University and Osgoode Hall Law School with his good friend Walter Stayshyn. Called to the Ontario bar in 1962, Borkovich articled with John Munroe and Jack Pelech. In 1963, Borkovich and Stayshyn opened a law practice in Hamilton.

According to Jaime Stephenson, president of the Hamilton Criminal Lawyers' Association, Borkovich truly believed in the jury system, "He was firm, but also kind and never devalued any participant in the judicial system, ..." However, he also knew when to come down hard, giving a violent child molester one of the harshest sentences ever assigned in Canada.

== Background ==
Born in Serbia, Borkovich moved to east Hamilton at the age of three. He graduated from Delta Secondary School where he played baseball and basketball. He carried his love of sports into adulthood, regularly attending football, hockey, and basketball games and later coaching his granddaughter's basketball team.

He was married to Marie Celeste for 54 years. They have two daughters, Lisa and Dana.
