= George Perazich =

George Nikolas Perazich (20 April 1905 – 26 May 1999) was born in the Principality of Montenegro.

Moving to the United States in 1927 at the age of 22, Perazich attended the University of California Engineering School for five years and also attended Wharton School of Finance in Pennsylvania. Perazich married his wife Amelia in 1933. Apart from his maternal language he spoke and wrote English and Italian and had a reading knowledge of Spanish, French and Russian. Perazich had been active the American Polish Labor Council as Business manager of its publication The Outlook. Perazich became a naturalized American citizen in 1942.

During World War II, Perazich worked for the U.S. State Department Foreign Economic Administration and, in November 1943, the Yugoslav section of the United Nations Relief and Rehabilitation Administration (UNRRA). Perazich listed David Weintraub of the United States Department of State, and a Soviet spy, as a reference when applying for the UNRRA job. Several items on the application for the United Nations appear inconsistent with what FBI investigators came up with. Perazich claimed to have graduated from the Naval Academy in Yugoslavia; the investigation found he entered the University of California on credentials of the Royal Nautical School in Kantor, Czechoslovakia, for example. In 1944, Perazich was assigned to the Balkans as Director of Displaced Persons for UNRRA. Later, Perazich worked for the Industrial Rehabilitation Division of the Yugoslavian Mission.
