= Putnik =

Putnik is a South Slavic language surname. Notable people with the surname include:

- Josif Putnik (1777-1830), bishop of the Serbian Orthodox Church
- Mojsije Putnik (1728-1790), Serbian Orthodox religious figure
- Radomir Putnik (1847-1917), first Serbian Field Marshal
