= Mount Putnik =

Mountain in Alberta, Canada

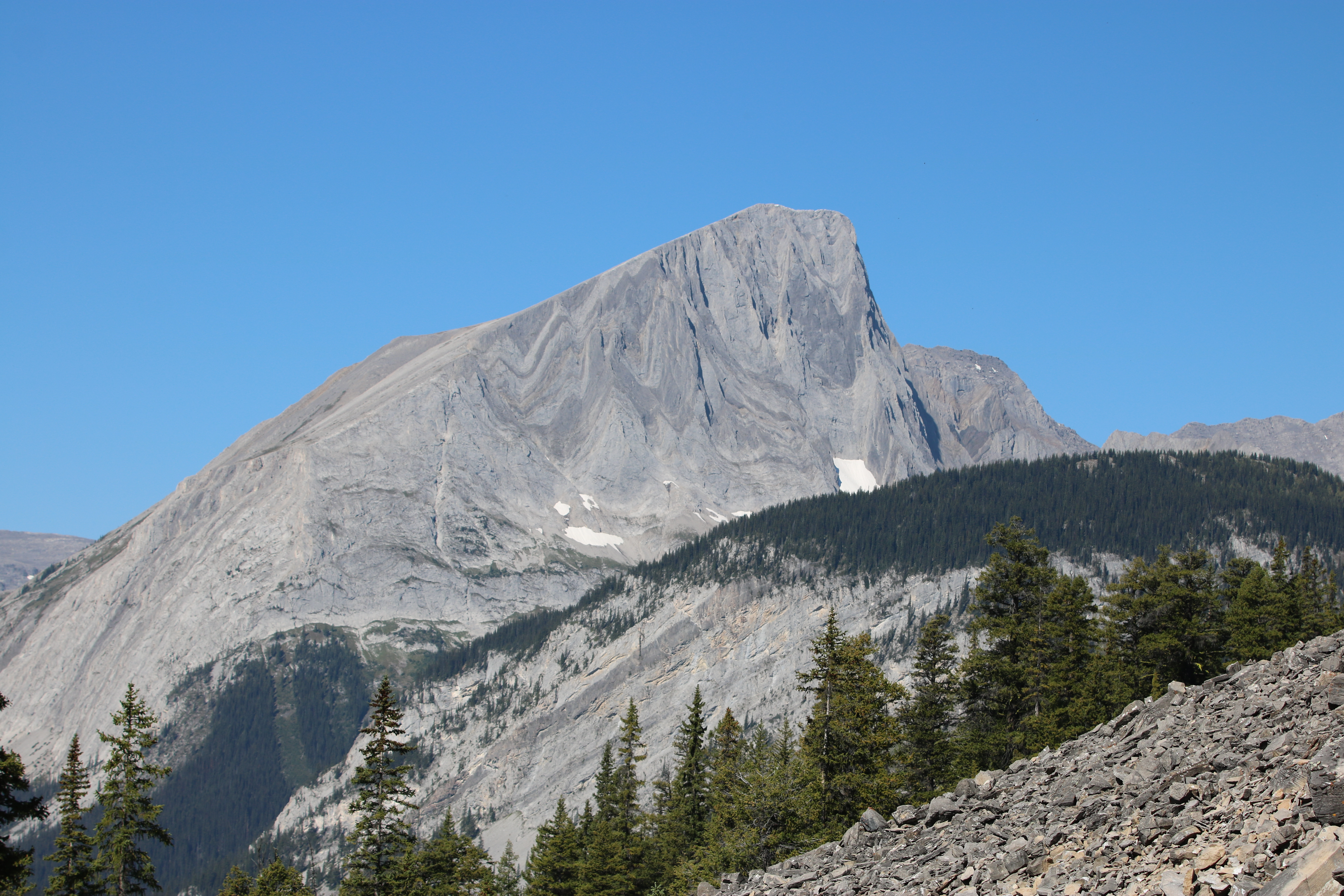
- Mount Putnik

Highest point
- Elevation: 2,940 m (9,650 ft)
- Prominence: 181 m (594 ft)
- Listing: Mountains of Alberta
- Coordinates: 50°38′36″N 115°15′26″W

Geography
- Location within Alberta Location within Canada
- Location: Alberta, Canada
- Parent range: Kananaskis Range; Canadian Rockies
- Topo map: NTS 82J11 Kananaskis Lakes

Climbing
- Easiest route: scramble

Mount Putnik is a mountain located north of Three Isle Creek and west of the Kananaskis River in Peter Lougheed Provincial Park Alberta, Canada. The mountain is named after the Serbian Field Marshal Radomir Putnik (1847–1917).

In June 2012, the Ravna Gora Serbian Heritage Society of Calgary, Alberta Canada, unveiled a plaque to commemorate Radomir Putnik on the mountain. The plaque text is as follows:

"Mount Putnik is named in perpetual remembrance of the men and women of the allied armed forces in Serbia and their leader Field Marshal Radomir Putnik (1847-1917). Serbia lost a quarter of its population, both army and civilian, during WWI (1914-1918). This sacrifice was part of Canadian and Allied efforts in Europe against three empires to protect the rights and freedoms of human kind".

== Climate ==
Based on the Köppen climate classification, it is located in a subarctic climate zone with cold, snowy winters, and mild summers. Temperatures can drop below −20 °C with wind chill factors below −30 °C. In terms of favorable weather, June through September are the best months to climb. Precipitation runoff from the mountain drains into tributaries of the Kananaskis River.

== See also ==
- List of mountains in the Canadian Rockies
