= Boris Spremo =

Canadian photojournalist

Boris Spremo CM
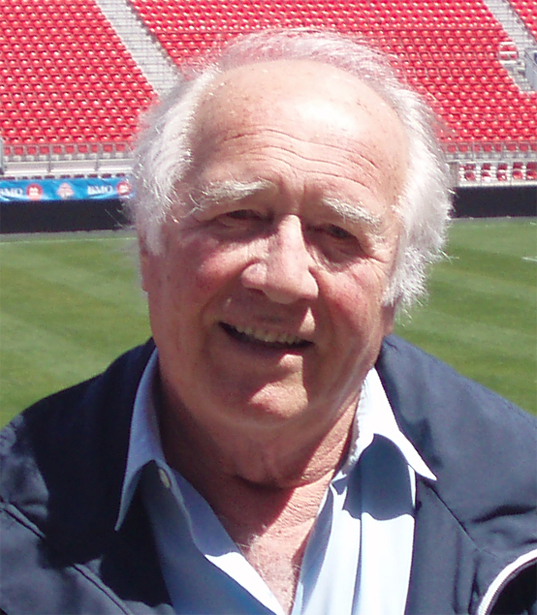
- Spremo at BMO Field in 2011
- Born: October 20, 1935; Sušak, Kingdom of Yugoslavia
- Died: August 21, 2017 (aged 81); Toronto, Ontario, Canada
- Occupation: Photojournalist

Boris Spremo, CM (Serbian Cyrillic: Борис Спремо; October 20, 1935 – August 21, 2017) was a Canadian photojournalist. He was the first photojournalist to receive the Order of Canada.

== Career ==
After graduating from the Belgrade Cinematographic Institute, he moved to Canada in 1957 via Paris. He found work with The Globe and Mail from 1962 to 1966, and finished his career with the Toronto Star. The Toronto Star later called him "a legend in the business". Some of his photographs appeared in both Canadian and American magazines. He was known for his collages depicting life in Toronto.

== Awards ==
Spremo won many regional and international awards for his work, including a World Press Photo award, the first for a Canadian. He was named a member of the Order of Canada in 1997, by Governor General Roméo LeBlanc at Rideau Hall in Ottawa. He was the first photojournalist to receive the award.

== Death ==
Spremo died on August 21, 2017, in Toronto's Sunnybrook Hospital at age 81, from complications of myeloma.

== Notes ==
1. Now Rijeka, Croatia.
