= Czech Australians =

Czech Australians Čeští Australani
Total population
- 7,437 (by birth, 2011); 22,772 (by ancestry, 2011)

Regions with significant populations
- Melbourne, Sydney

Languages
- Australian English, Czech

Religion
- Irreligion (majority) · Roman Catholic (minority)

Related ethnic groups
- Czech New Zealanders, Slovak Australians, Czech Canadians, Czech Americans

Czech Australians are Australian citizens of Czech ancestry. Most Czech immigrants to Australia came after World War II and 1968–1969. Most recently the biggest influx is of students coming to Australia to study English and to find work. Many of them are deciding to stay by gaining permanent residency. According to 2016 census figures, around 24,500 Australians identify as having Czech ancestry, mostly in Melbourne and Sydney. In the 1960s and 1970s, two of the most successful Australian soccer clubs were Slavia Melbourne and Sydney FC Prague.

== Notable Czech Australians ==
Name	Birth year	Occupation
Edouard Borovansky	1902	Ballet dancer, director
Jindrich Nermut	1917	Politician and exile
Tony Sponar	1920	Founder of Thredbo ski resort
Victor Vodicka	1921	Gold and silversmith, educator
Josef Chromy	1931	Businessman
Jiri Lev	1979	Architect
Voyen Koreis	1943	Writer, journalist, artist
Miroslav Bukovsky	1944	Jazz trumpeter, composer
Josef Stejskal	1945	Artist
Stan Zemanek	1947	Radio Broadcaster
Jana Wendt	1956	Television journalist, writer
Mark Korda	1957	Businessman and former president of the Collingwood Football Club.
Hana Mandlíková	1962	Tennis player
Charles Vesely	1965	Theologian and Uniting Church minister
Lenka Kripac	1978	Musician
Petr Kratky	1981	Football manager
Isaka Cernak	1989	Footballer

== See also ==
- Czech diaspora
- European Australians
- Europeans in Oceania
- Immigration to Australia
- Czech New Zealanders
