= Czechs in France =

Total population
- Czech-born residents 50,220 (2001 Census); 90,000 (2009 ONS estimate)

Regions with significant populations
- Greater Paris and South East France

Languages
- French, Czech, Czenglish

Religion
- Irreligion (majority) · Roman Catholic (minority)

Related ethnic groups
- Czech people • Czech diaspora • White Other

Czechs in France refers to the phenomenon of Czech people migrating to France from the Czech Republic or from the political entities that preceded it, such as Czechoslovakia. There is a substantial number of people in France with Czech ancestry, including 100,220 Czech-born people recorded as resident in France. One notable Czech-French writer is Milan Kundera.

== See also ==
- Czech Republic–France relations
- Demographics of the Czech Republic
- Czech people
- Immigration to France
- Polish minority in France
- Russians in France
- Germans in France
