= Czech New Zealanders =

Czech New Zealanders Čeští Novozélanďané
Total population
- 1 740

Regions with significant populations
- Auckland

Languages
- New Zealand English, Czech

Religion
- Irreligion (majority) · Roman Catholic (minority)

Related ethnic groups
- Czech Australians, Slovak Australians, Czech Canadians, Czech Americans

Czechs New Zealanders is a term used for residents of New Zealand who are of Czech nationality or Czech descent. According to Statistics New Zealand, in 2018, there were 1,740 Czechs living in New Zealand, with approximately one-third of them residing in the Auckland Region.

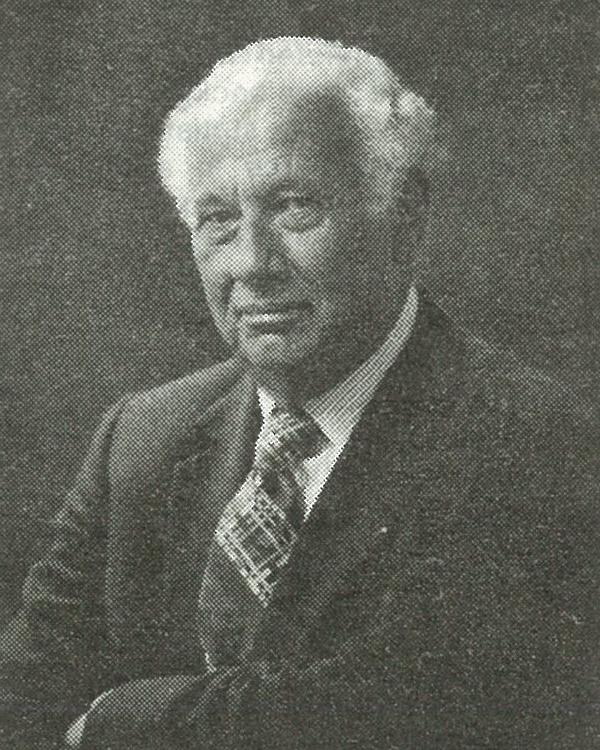
Frederick Turnovsky, one of the most notable Czech New Zealanders

The migration of Czechs to New Zealand began during the European settlement of the country in the second half of the 19th century. A larger number of Czechs arrived in New Zealand after 1968.

The Czech community in New Zealand is represented by the organization CANZA (Czech Australian New Zealand Association), which is based in Prague.

== Notable Czech New Zealanders ==
- Frederick Turnovsky (1916–1994), businessman and patron of the arts
- Jindra Tichá (1937), writer
- Hana Guy (1969), tennis player
- Lizzie Marvelly (1989), singer
- Helene Ritchie (1945), local politician in Wellington
- Janinka Greenwood (1947), writer
- Joseph Pawelka (1887–?), criminal
- Jos Divis (1885–1967), photographer

== See also ==
- Czech Diaspora
- Europeans in Oceania
- European New Zealanders
- Immigration to New Zealand
- Czech Australians
