= Czech Republic–France relations =

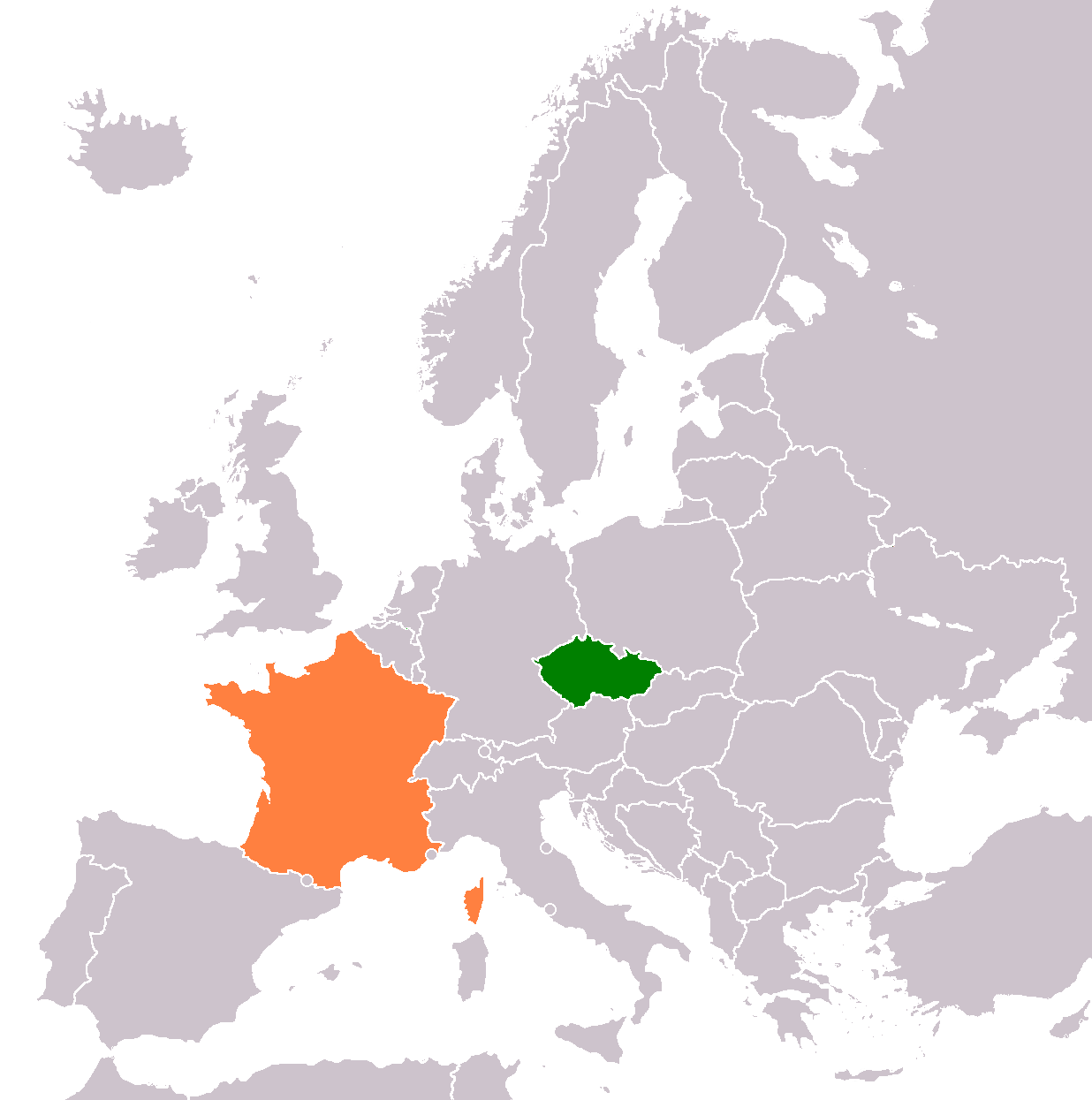
- Czech Republic: France

The Czech Republic and France have maintained a historical and current relationship. The first diplomatic contacts between the two countries date back to the Middle Ages.

Both countries are full members of the Council of Europe, the European Union and NATO. Since 1999, the Czech Republic is also an observer in the Francophonie.

== History ==
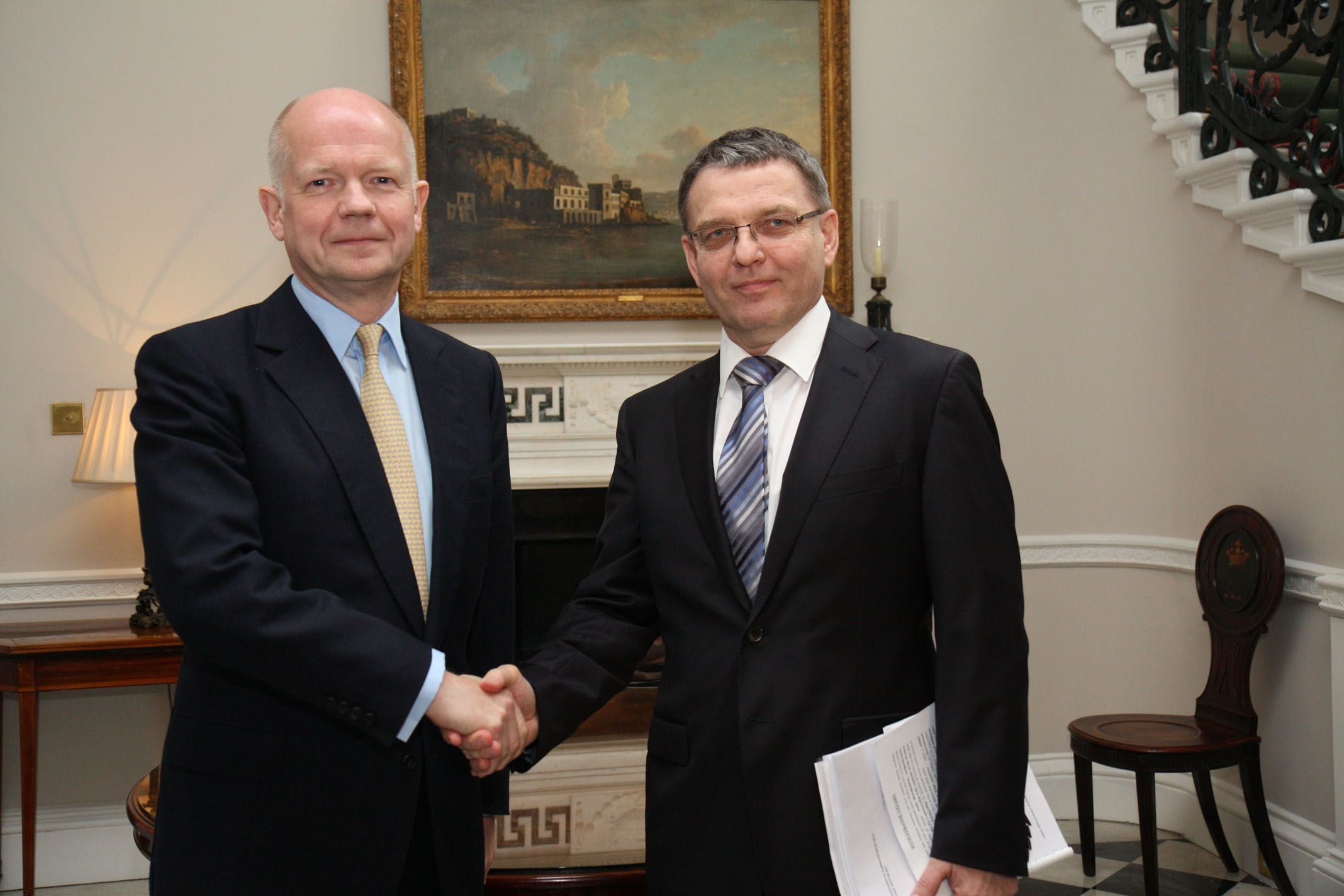
British Foreign Secretary William Hague meeting Czech Minister of Foreign Affairs, Lubomír Zaorálek in London, May 2014.

King John of Bohemia fought on the side of France several times, and was killed in action in the Battle of Crécy in 1346. His successor Charles IV was reared in Paris.

France was the first country to recognize Czechoslovakia on 28 October 1918. France supported the signing of the Little Entente and consequently signed the Treaty of Alliance and Friendship between France and Czechoslovakia on 25 January 1924.

Ties were somewhat strained when the French Republic signed the Munich Agreement (1938) with the United Kingdom, Nazi Germany, and Fascist Italy, which allowed the German annexation of most of Czechoslovakia. Many Czechs (and Poles) viewed the treaty as the "Munich betrayal" (Czech: Mnichovská zrada).

Britain and France had to choose between war and dishonour. They chose dishonour. They will have war.

— Winston Churchill on the Munich Agreement

== Education ==
There is a French international school in Prague, Lycée français de Prague.

== the European Union and NATO ==
While France was one of the founding members of the EU, the Czech Republic joined the EU in 2004. While France was one of the founding members of NATO, the Czech Republic joined NATO in 1999. France fully supported the Czech Republic's application to join NATO, which resulted in membership on 12 March 1999, and then the European Union, which resulted in membership on 1 May 2004.

== Resident diplomatic missions ==
- Czech Republic has an embassy in Paris.
- France has an embassy in Prague.
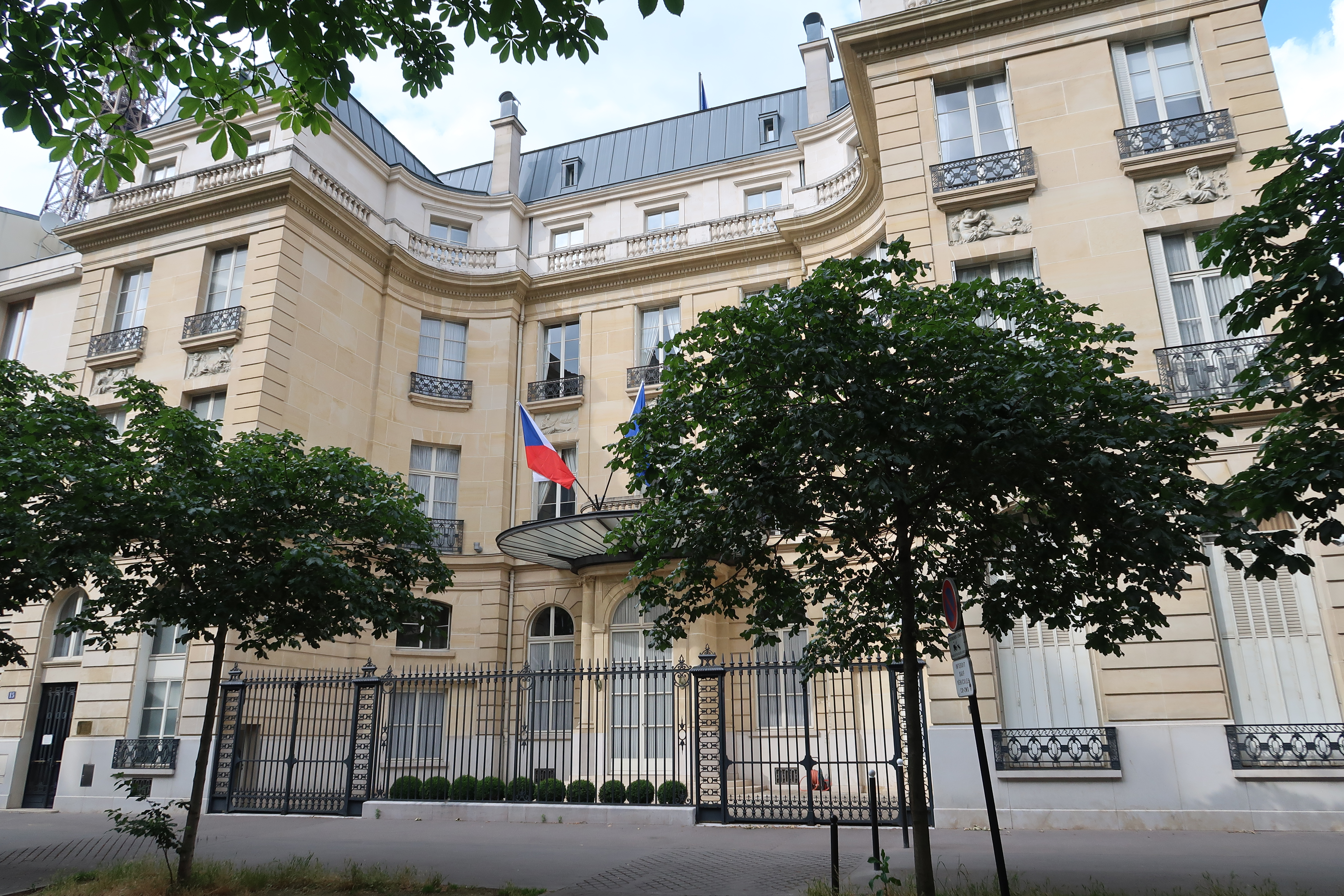
Embassy of the Czech Republic in Paris

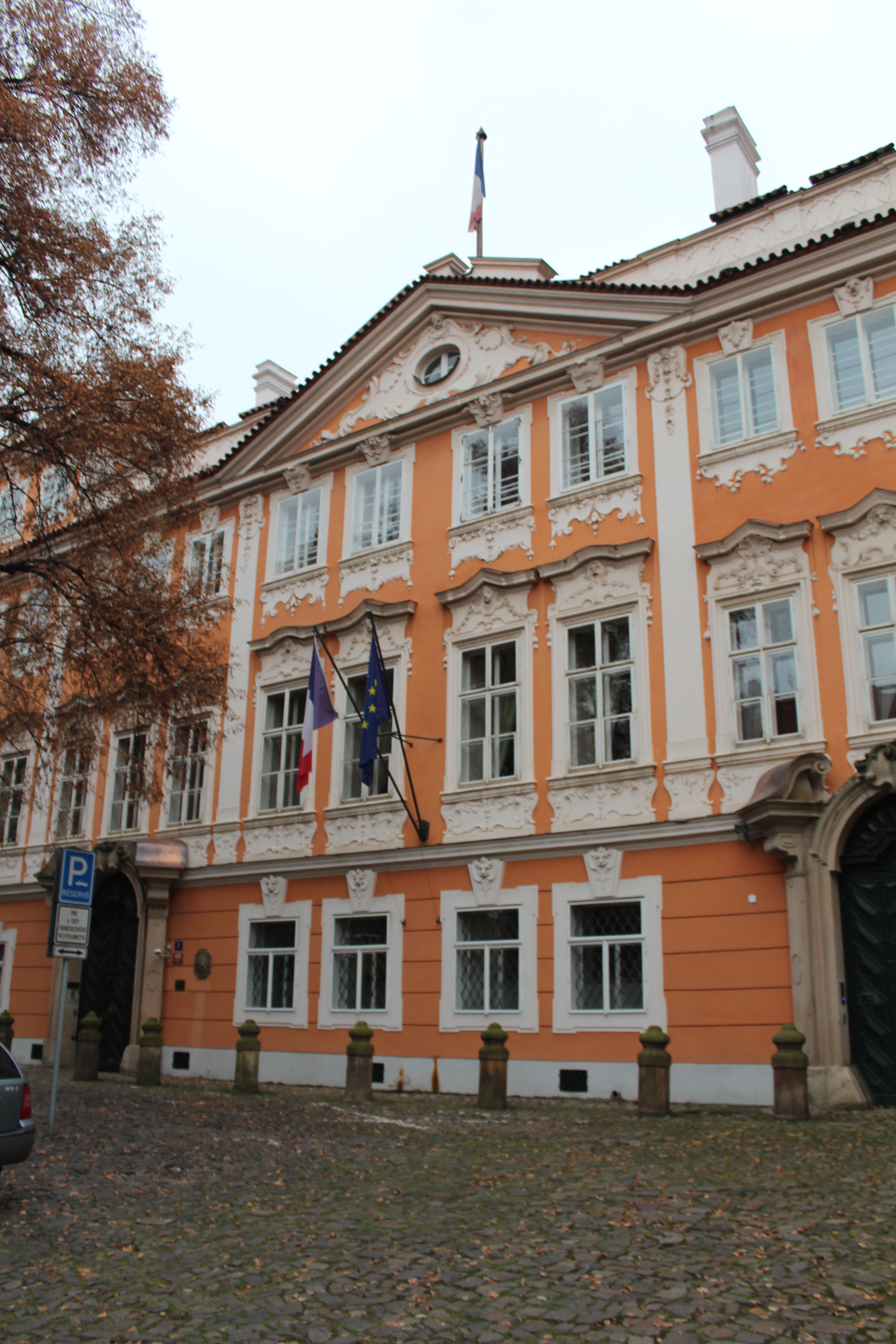
Embassy of France in Prague

== See also ==
- Foreign relations of the Czech Republic
- Foreign relations of France
- Embassy of France, Prague
- Czechs in France
- Frenchs in the Czech Republic
