= Czech diaspora =

Czech emigrants and their descendants

Countries with significant Czech population and descendants. Czech Republic + 1,000,000 + 100,000 + 10,000 + 1,000

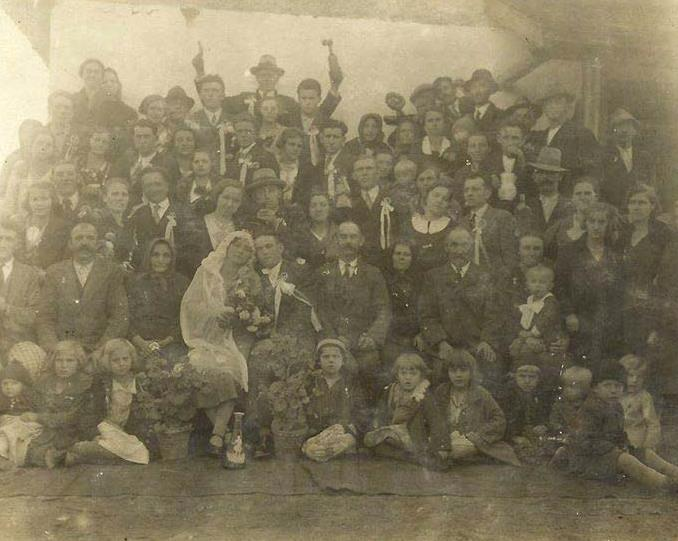
Czech wedding guests in Nova Vesi, near Srbac, 1934.

The Czech diaspora refers to both historical and present emigration from the Czech Republic, as well as from the former Czechoslovakia and the Czech lands (including Bohemia, Moravia and Silesia). The country with the largest number of Czechs living abroad is the United States.

== Communities ==
- Austria (Vienna)
- Czechs and Slovaks in Bulgaria
- Czechs of Croatia
- Czechs in Poland
- Czechs in Romania
- Czechs in Serbia
- Czechs in Ukraine
- Czechs in France
- Czechs in the United Kingdom
- Czech diaspora in Israel
- Czech Americans (Baltimore, Omaha, Texas)
- Czech Canadians
- Czech Mexicans
- Czechs in Argentina
- Czech Brazilians
- Czech Australians
- Czech New Zealanders

== Distribution by country ==
Below is a list of top 15 countries with the most Czech-born people. In the case of Germany, it is noteworthy that many might be Sudeten Germans, expelled from the Czech Republic following Germany's defeat in WW2.

United States: 1,200,285

Germany: 603,049

Slovakia: 89,560

United Kingdom: 45,578

Austria: 37,118

Canada: 22,677

Switzerland: 15,522

Australia: 14,045

Spain: 11,539

Russia: 11,249

Italy: 9,536

France: 8,907

Ireland: 6,972

Poland: 5,952

Greece: 4,516

== Famous people of Czech descent ==
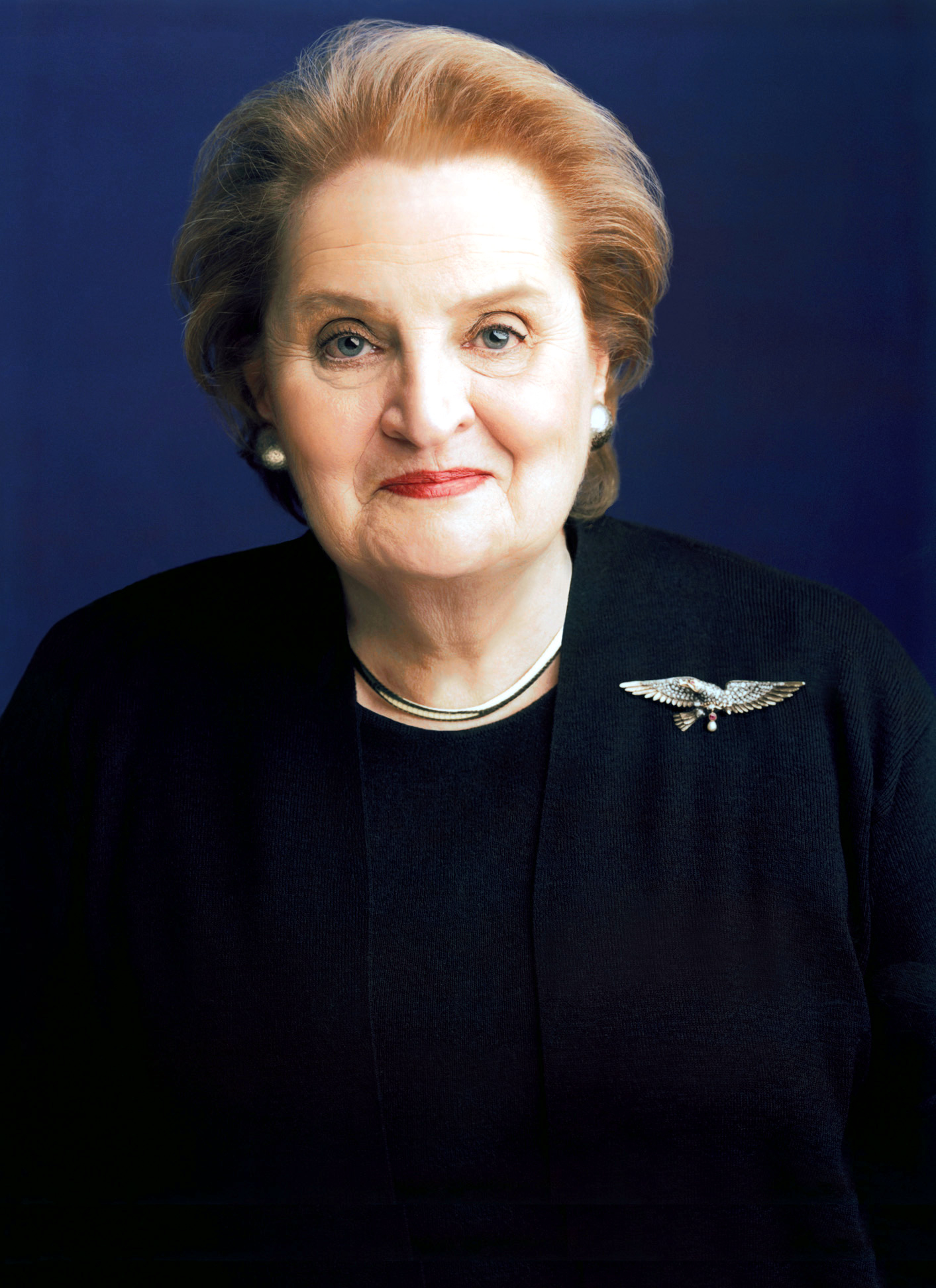
Madeleine Albright, the first woman to become a United States Secretary of State, was of Czech descent and was born in Prague

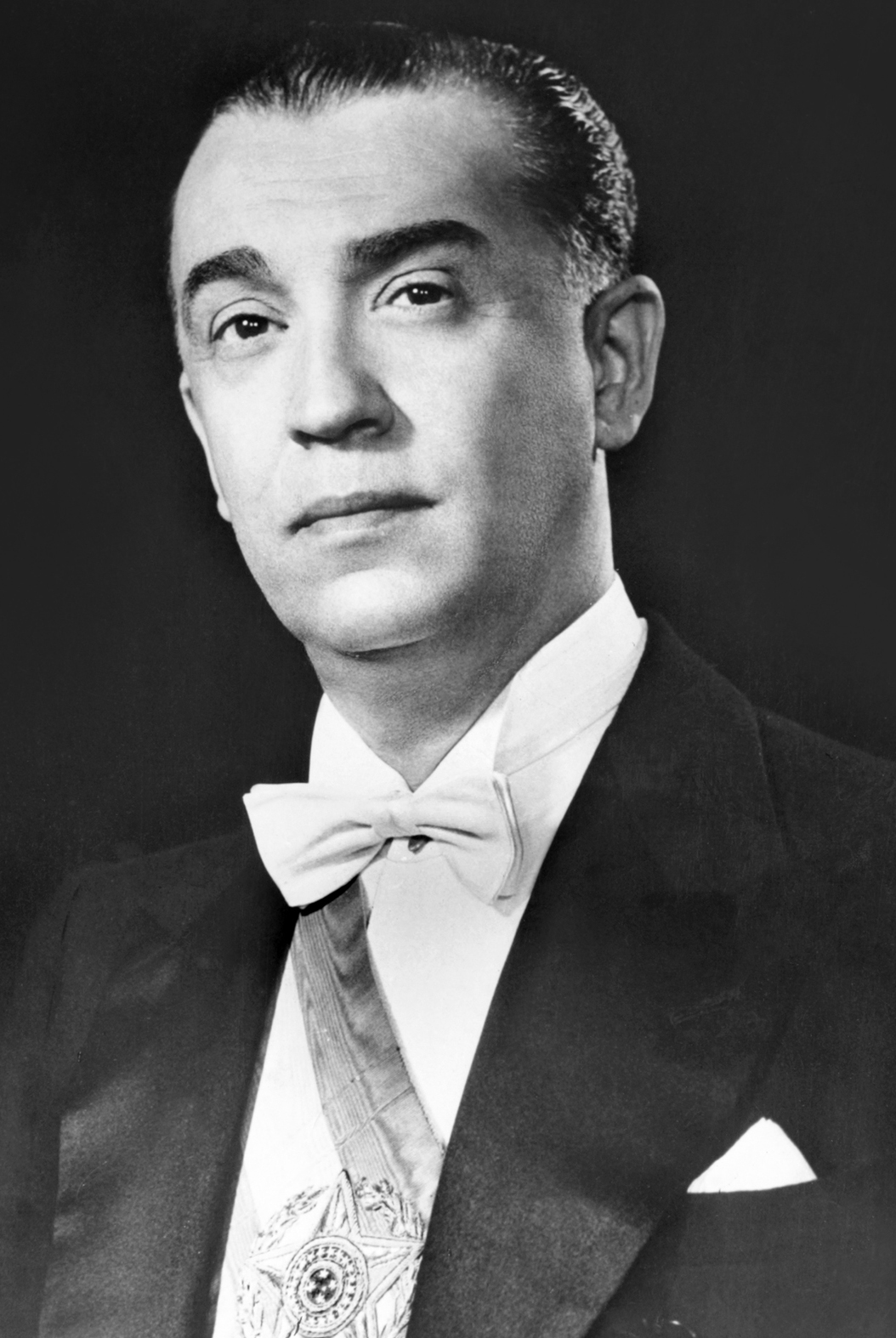
Juscelino Kubitschek, a prominent Brazilian politician of Czech origin who was President of Brazil from 1956 to 1961.

- Madeleine Albright, the first woman to become a United States Secretary of State
- Ivana Bacik, Teachta dála of Ireland
- Yehuda Bauer, an Israeli historian and scholar of the Holocaust
- Edouard Borovansky, a Czech-born Australian ballet dancer, choreographer and director
- Georgina Bouzova, an English television actress
- Louis Brandeis, an associate justice of the Supreme Court of the United States from 1916 to 1939
- Thomas Cech, a Nobel Laureate in chemistry
- Anton Cermak, the mayor of Chicago, Illinois, from 1931 until his assassination in 1933
- Eugene Cernan, a retired United States Navy officer and a former NASA astronaut and engineer
- Miloš Forman, a Czech-American director, screenwriter, professor, and an emigrant from Czechoslovakia
- André Glucksmann, a French philosopher and writer
- George Halas, a player, coach, owner and pioneer in professional American football
- Hippolyte Havel, a Czech anarchist who lived in Greenwich Village, New York
- Juscelino Kubitschek, a prominent Brazilian politician of Czech descent who was President of Brazil from 1956 to 1961
- Milan Kundera, a writer of Czech origin who has lived in exile in France since 1975, where he became a naturalized citizen in 1981
- Lenka, an Australian singer and songwriter
- Jim Lovell, a former NASA astronaut and a retired captain in the United States Navy
- Felix Moscheles, an English painter, peace activist and advocate of Esperanto
- Kim Novak, is an American actress best known for her performance in the 1958 film Vertigo
- Fredy Perlman, an author, publisher and activist
- Jan Pinkava, a Czech-British animator and film director
- Václav Smil, a Czech-Canadian scientist and policy analyst
- Josef Škvorecký, a leading contemporary Czech writer and publisher who has spent much of his life in Canada
- Tom Stoppard, a British playwright, knighted in 1997
- Roberto Weiss, an Italian-British scholar and historian
- John Zerzan, an American anarchist and primitivist philosopher and author
- Robert Vanasek, an American politician
- Exene Cervenka, an American singer
- Ivan Mládek, a Czech recording artist
- Ewa Farna, a Polish-Czech pop-rock singer

== Politics ==
=== 2025 ===
Region	ANO	Spolu	STAN	Pirates	SPD	AUTO	Others	Turnout
Abroad	3.95	39.26	21.48	28.24	2.04	2.32	2.60	79.38
Czech Republic	34.51	23.36	11.23	8.97	7.78	6.77	7.27	68.95
Source: Volby

=== 2023 ===
==== First round ====
Region	Petr Pavel	Andrej Babiš	Danuše Nerudová	Pavel Fischer	Jaroslav Bašta	Marek Hilšer	Karel Diviš	Tomáš Zima
Europe	55.50	3.66	29.43	7.12	1.04	2.67	0.43	0.15
Americas	58.57	4.93	26.19	6.28	2.60	1.08	0.36	0.00
Asia	58.03	7.09	22.63	6.57	1.34	3.29	0.60	0.45
Africa	59.50	3.50	18.00	10.50	3.50	3.00	1.00	1.00
Australia and Oceania	53.42	5.14	29.11	5.48	4.45	1.71	0.34	0.34
Czech Republic	35.4	35.0	13.9	6.8	4.5	2.6	1.4	0.6
Source: Czech Statistical Office

==== Second round ====
Region	Petr Pavel	Andrej Babiš
Europe	95.64	4.36
Americas	94.02	5.98
Asia	93.41	6.59
Africa	94.26	5.74
Australia and Oceania	89.17	10.83
Czech Republic Total	58.32	41.68
Source: Czech Statistical Office

=== 2021 ===
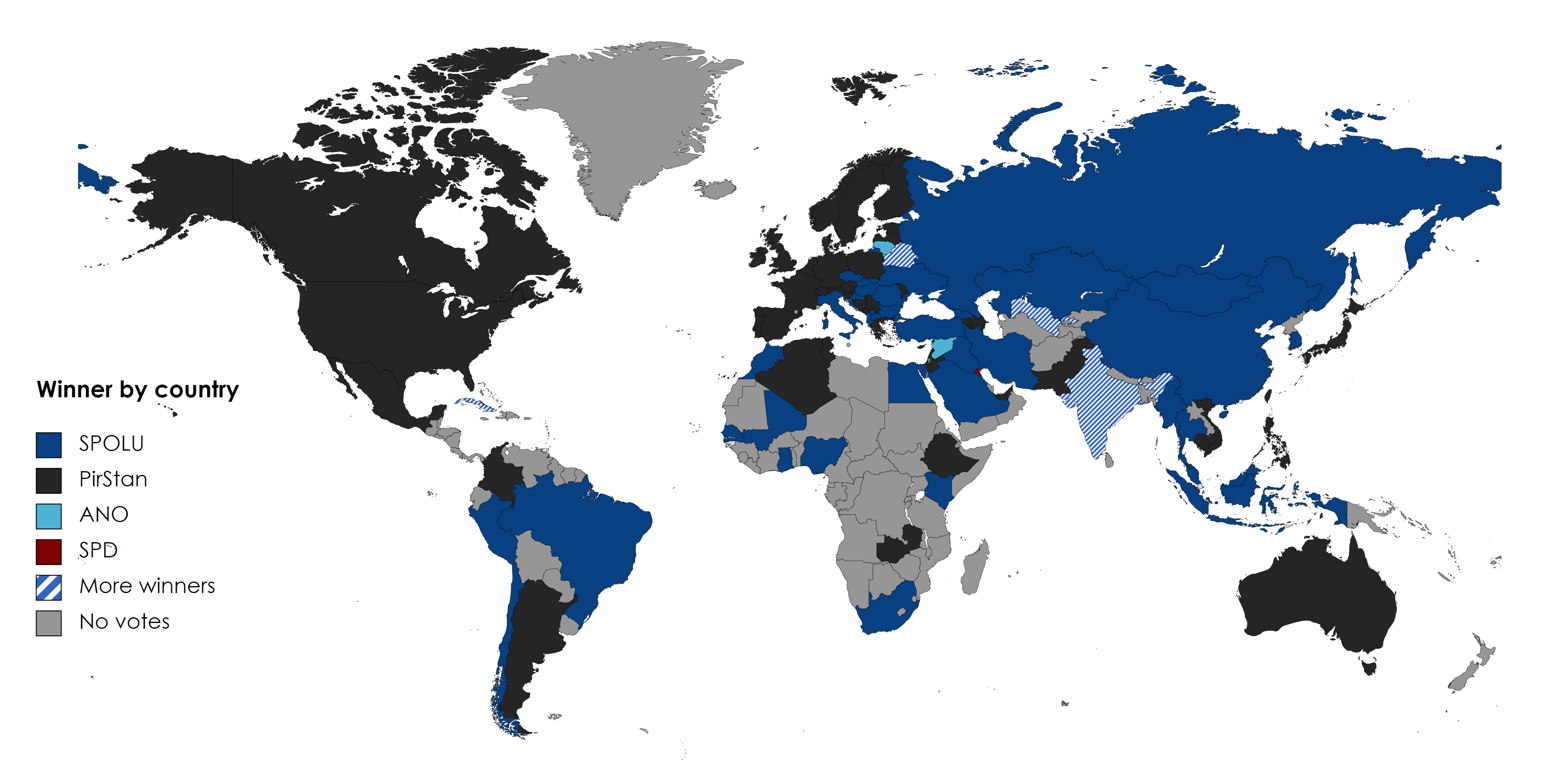
2021 Czech parliamentary election results by country.

Results
Party	Votes	%
Pirates and Mayors	6,654	50.47%
SPOLU	4,517	34.26%
ANO	659	4.99%
Freedom and Direct Democracy	289	2.19%
Green Party	245	1.86%
Tricolour–Svobodní–Soukromníci	212	1.61%
Přísaha	211	1.60%
Czech Social Democratic Party	201	1.53%
Free Bloc	68	0.52%
Communist Party of Bohemia and Moravia	50	0.38%
Swiss Democracy	19	0.14%
Czech Crown	17	0.13%
We Will Open Czechia	11	0.08%
Alliance of National Forces	9	0.07%
Sources Movement	9	0.07%
Alliance for the Future	7	0.05%
Urza.cz	6	0.05%

== See also ==
- History of the Czech Republic
- List of Czechs
