= Czechs in the United Kingdom =

Total population
- Czech-born residents in the United Kingdom: 50,311 (2021/22 Census) (Note: Does not include ethnic Czechs born in the United Kingdom or those with Czech ancestry. Also does not include those who identified they were born in Czechoslovakia.); England: 44,369 (2021); Scotland: 3,367 (2022); Wales: 1,799 (2021); Northern Ireland: 776 (2021); Previous estimates: 45,000 (2013 ONS estimate)

Regions with significant populations
- Greater London and South East England

Languages
- British English, Czech

Religion
- Irreligion (majority) · Roman Catholic (minority) · Others

Related ethnic groups
- Czech people • White Other • Czech Americans

Czechs in the United Kingdom (Czech: Češi ve Spojeném království) refers to the phenomenon of Czech people migrating to the United Kingdom from the Czech Republic or from the political entities that preceded it, such as Czechoslovakia. There are some people in the UK who were either born in the Czech lands or have Czech ancestry, some of whom descended from Jewish refugees (e.g. Kindertransport) who arrived during World War II.

== Population ==
The 2001 UK Census recorded 12,220 Czech-born people resident in the UK. With the accession of the Czech Republic to the European Union in May 2004, Czechs gained the right to live and work elsewhere in the EU, and large numbers moved to the UK for work, although there has been substantial return migration. The Office for National Statistics estimates that 45,000 Czech-born immigrants were resident in the UK in 2013. The 2011 UK Census recorded 34,615 Czech-born residents in England, 1,256 in Wales, 2,245 in Scotland, and 662 in Northern Ireland. The figure for Scotland includes people who specified that they were born in Czechoslovakia, but the figures for England, Wales and Northern Ireland do not. 1,279 people in England, 39 in Wales and 16 in Northern Ireland are recorded as having been born in Czechoslovakia without specifying the Czech Republic or Slovakia.

== Notable people with Czech ancestry ==
- Milan Baroš, footballer
- Roman Bednář, footballer
- Patrik Berger, footballer
- Georgina Bouzova, actress
- Alf Dubs, Baron Dubs, politician
- Petr Čech, footballer
- Josef Franc, motorcycle speedway rider
- Vera Fusek, actress
- Elsbeth Hamilton, Women's Auxiliary Air Force veteran, last known surviving Czechoslovak veteran of World War II in the United Kingdom
- Eva Hayman, Holocaust survivor, diarist and nurse
- Anna Hájková, historian
- Eva Jiřičná, architect
- Jan Kaplický, architect
- Jan Kavan, diplomat and politician
- Čeněk Kottnauer, chess master
- Karel Kuttelwascher, fighter pilot
- Sir Frank William Lampl, Life President of Bovis Lend Lease
- Miroslav Liskutin, fighter pilot WW2
- Herbert Lom, actor
- Dan Luger, English rugby union player
- Ivan Margolius, author, architect and propagator of Czech culture and technology
- Jan Pinkava, animator, film director
- Hana Maria Pravda, actress
- Dominic Raab, politician
- Karel Reisz, film director
- Tom Stoppard, screenwriter, playwright

== See also ==
- Demographics of the Czech Republic
- Czech people
- White Other
- Czech Republic–United Kingdom relations
- Czech Americans
- Czech Canadians
