= Vera Gissing =

Czech-British writer (1928–2022)

- Born: Věra Diamantová; 4 July 1928; Čelákovice, Czechoslovakia
- Died: 12 March 2022 (aged 93); Wargrave, Berkshire, England

Vera Gissing (born Věra Diamantová; 4 July 1928 – 12 March 2022) was a Czech-British writer, translator, and one of "Winton's children", the children saved by the actions of Nicholas Winton. Her sister, who accompanied her on the kindertransport, was the diarist and nurse Eva Hayman.

== Biography ==
Gissing was born in Čelákovice, near Prague, on 4 July 1928, to a Czech Jewish family. She was one of the Czechoslovak Jewish children in 1939 who was rescued from transport to the United Kingdom by British broker and humanitarian Nicholas Winton. After the end of World War II, when most of her family perished in concentration camps during the Holocaust, she returned to Czechoslovakia, where she lived until 1948, then emigrated again to the United Kingdom, where she resided. Her story was depicted in a 2021 book by Peter Sís, called Nicky & Vera.

She was the author of the autobiographical book Perličky dětství, composed "not only of personal memories of the pre-war and war years, but also of diary entries and letters that Věra wrote mainly with her parents and later with her sister."

Gissing died from vascular dementia at a nursing home in Wargrave, Berkshire, on 12 March 2022, aged 93.

== Bibliography ==
- Pearls of Childhood, 1990
- Perličky dětství, 1992.
- Nicholas Winton: The Power of Good, 2002.
