= Czech diaspora in Israel =

Czechs in Israel
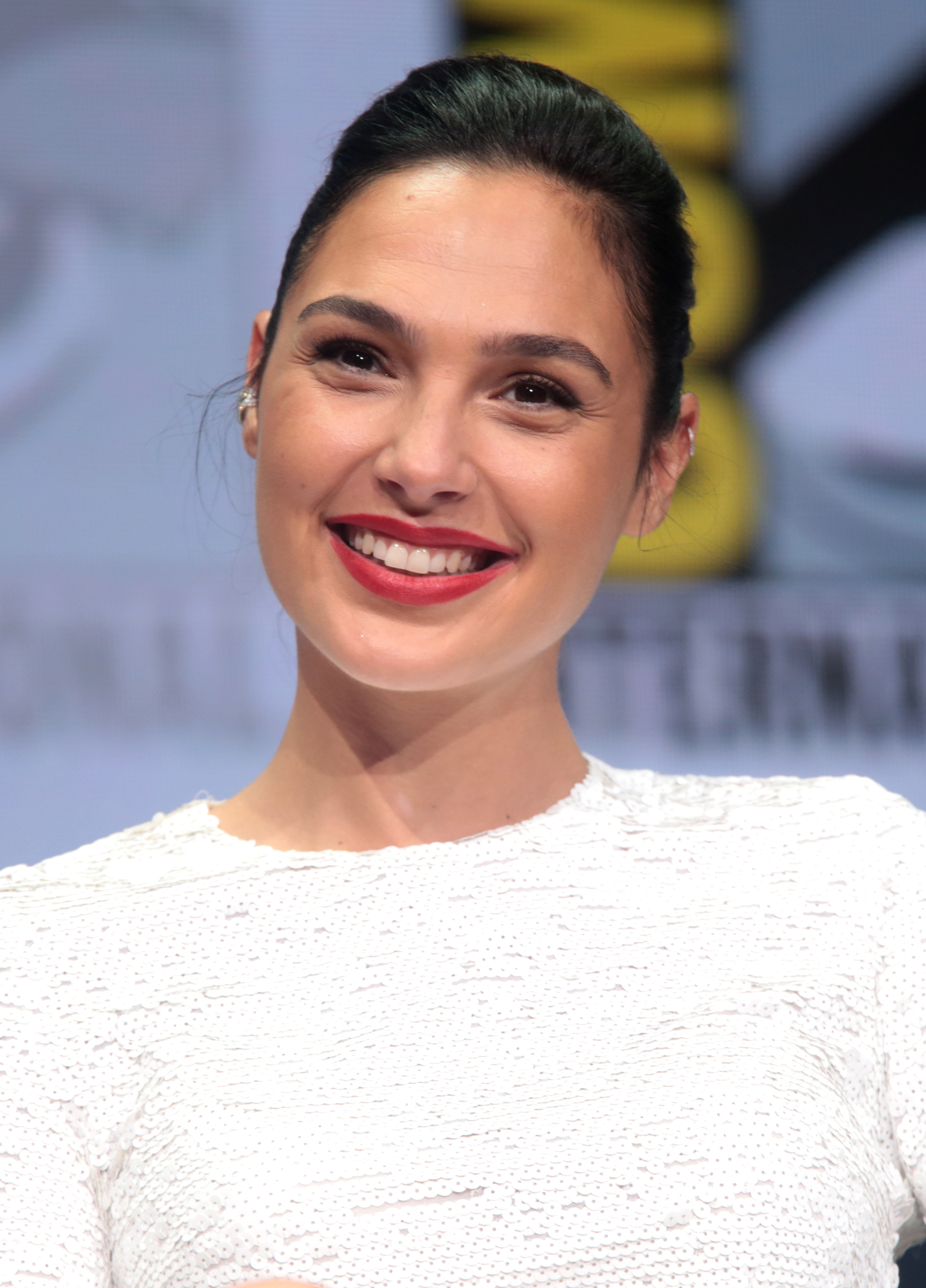

Total population
- Czech-born residents 50,220 (2001 Census); 90,000 (2009 ONS estimate)

Regions with significant populations
- Jerusalem, Gush Dan and either places from Israel, especially Kfar Masaryk

Languages
- Yiddish, Czech, Hebrew, Czenglish

Religion
- Judaism

Related ethnic groups
- Ashkenazi Jews; Slovak Jews; Czech people

The Czechs in Israel are people who have emigrated from the Czech lands, mostly from the former Czechoslovakia, as well as their descendants. Czechs in Israel are predominantly Ashkenazi Jews who made aliyah during the 20th century.

== History ==
In 1968, Israel relaxed immigration for refugees from Soviet-occupied Czechoslovakia, both Jewish and non-Jewish. Interfaith families and couples were granted the same rights and responsibilities as other immigrants.

The Czech-Israeli journalist Ruth Bondy has written a book exploring the lives of Czech-born Jews in Israel. Bondy has written that Czech Jews in Israel have developed a reputation for being "square" and law-abiding.

In the 1940s and 1950s, Jewish immigrants from Czechoslovakia, many of them survivors of The Holocaust, took part in founding twenty communities in Israel.

== Notable people ==
In addition, a considerable number of people of Czech and Slovak origin settled in existing Israeli towns and cities. Israeli people of Czech descent include:

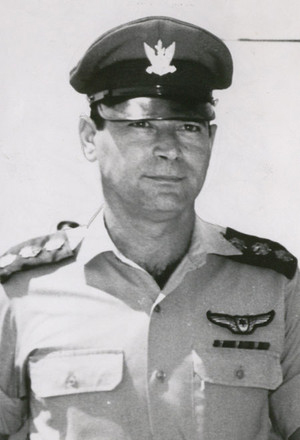
Yosef Alon

- Yosef Alon
- Edna Arbel
- Tuvia Beeri
- Ruth Bondy
- David Flusser
- Gal Gadot
- Esther Hoffe
- Hezi Leskali
- Gideon Levy
- Leo Perutz
- Avital Ronell

== Cuisine ==
The "Little Prague" restaurant chain in Israel serves traditional Czech cuisine.

== See also ==
- Czech Republic–Israel relations
- Czech diaspora
- History of the Jews in the Czech Republic
- Ethnic groups in Israel
