= Embassy of France, Prague =

French embassy in Prague, Czechia

Coordinates: 50°05′08″N 14°24′23″E

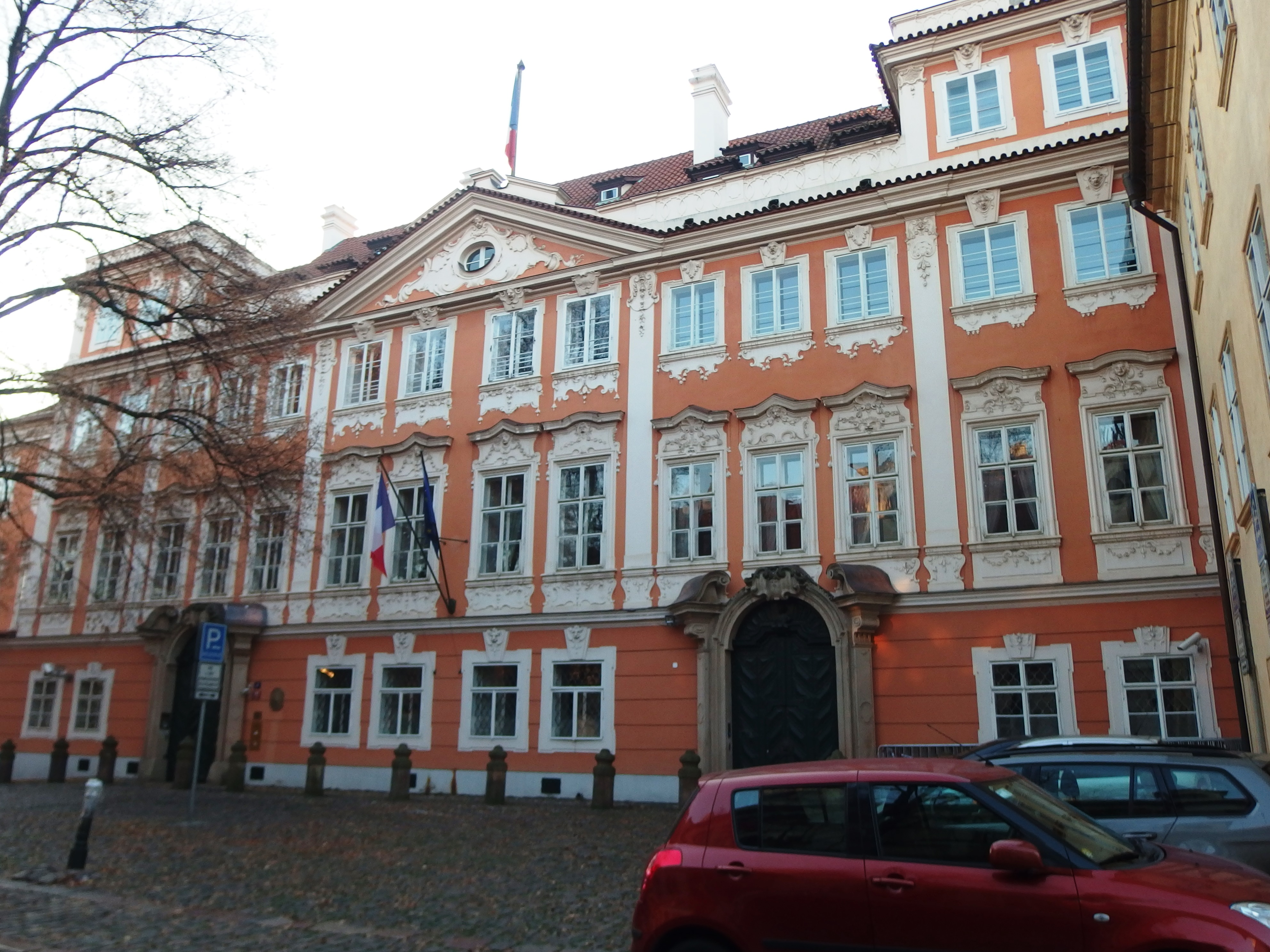
Buquoy Palace in Prague

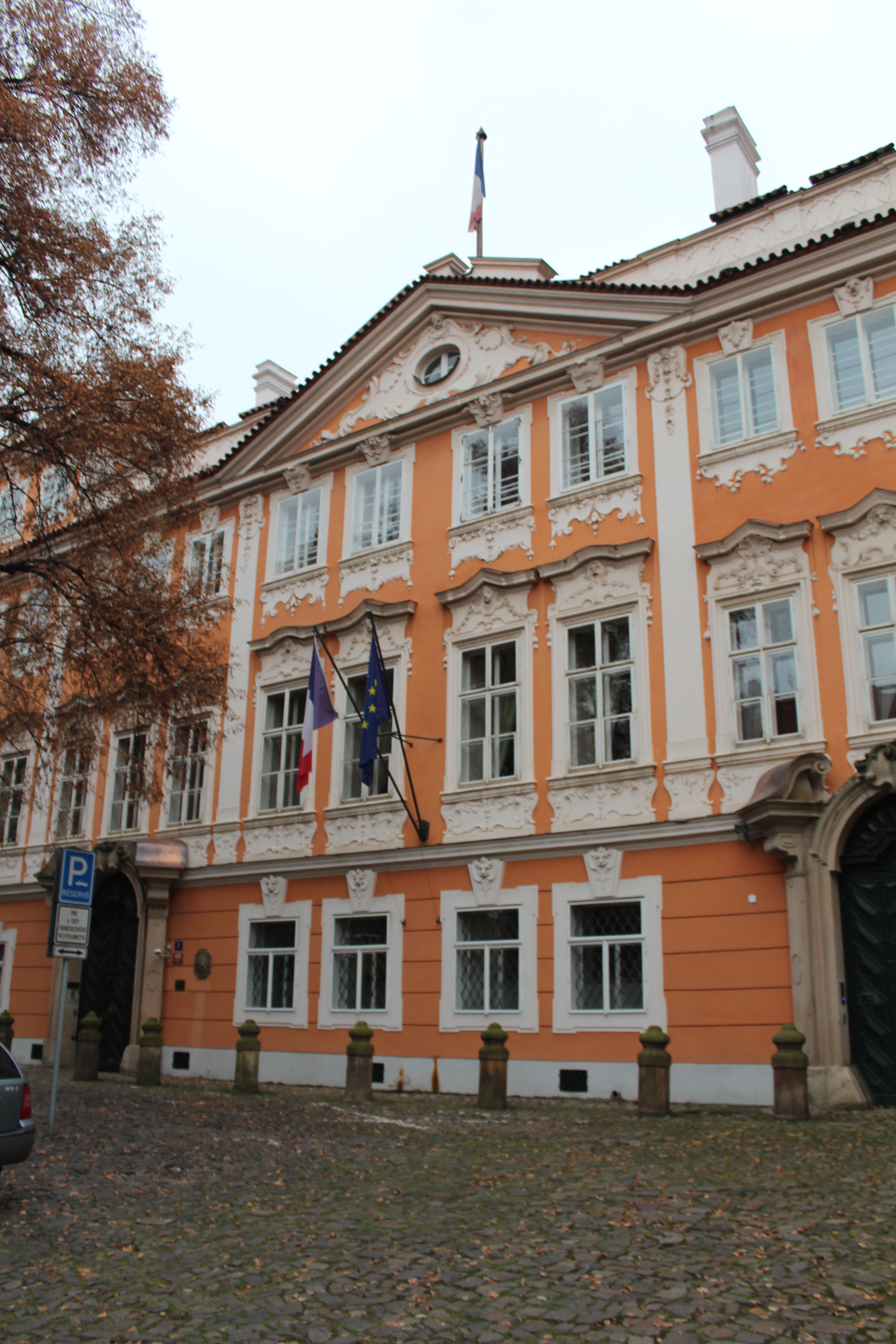
French Embassy in Prague

The Embassy of France to the Czech Republic (Czech: Francouzské velvyslanectví v Praze) is in Velkopřevorské náměstí, Malá Strana, Prague, near Kampa Island in the River Vltava. It occupies the baroque Buquoy Palace, which was originally built in 1667 and then altered during the 18th century. The ground floor of the embassy was flooded during the August 2002 floods.

== See also ==
- Czech Republic–France relations
- Lycée français de Prague
