= Pavel Janáček =

Czech literary historian and critic (born 1968)

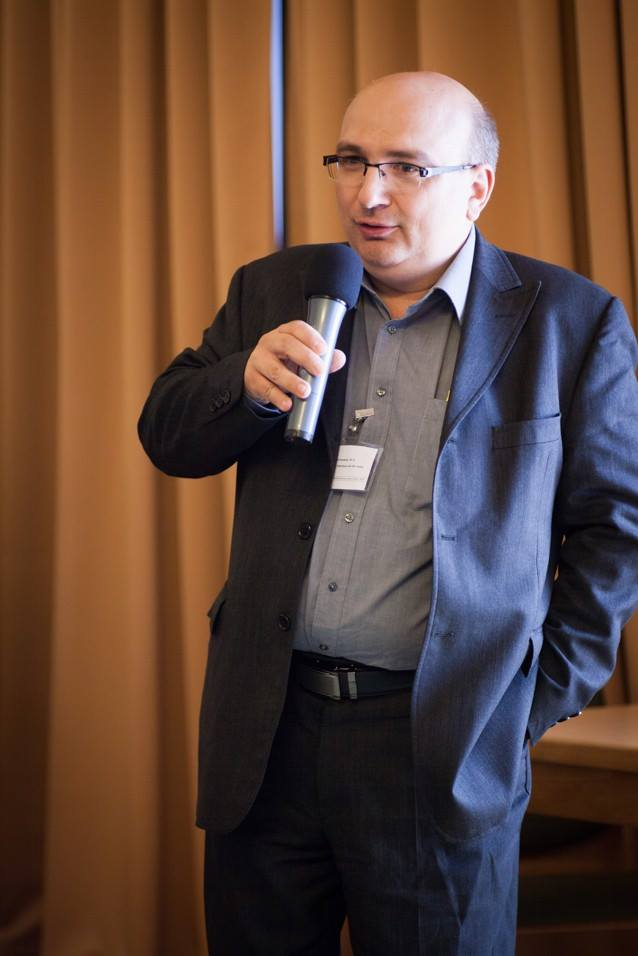
Pavel Janáček

Pavel Janáček (born January 16, 1968, in Prague) is a Czech literary historian and critic. His research focus and interests lie in popular literature, pulp fiction and the literary culture of late the 19th and particularly the 20th century. Currently, he specializes in the history of censorship and the social regulation of literature.

The political environment of Czechoslovakia before 1989 – his parents were intellectuals critical towards the Warsaw pact invasion in Czechoslovakia in August 1968 – prevented him from attending the Faculty of Arts of the Charles University. Instead he earned himself a degree from the Prague University of Economics. Between 1990 and 1995, he worked for the cultural section of the daily Lidové noviny, in 1995–1996 for the literary magazine Tvar. Since 1995, he is affiliated with the Institute for Czech Literature of the Czech Academy of Sciences initially at the Department for Contemporary Literature (which he was leading for a short period). In 2003, he established the Department for Research into Literary Culture. From 2010 until 2020, he was the director of the Institute of Czech Literature.

Between 2003 and 2010 Janáček taught literature at the Institute of Czech and Comparative Literature at the Faculty of Arts of the Charles University. The programme Vltava of the Czech public radio Český rozhlas regularly broadcasts his show "Slovo o literatuře", where he and his guests debate contemporary Czech fiction and current literary events.

== Bibliography ==
- Janáček, Pavel; Jareš, Michal (2013). Svět rodokapsu. Komentovaný soupis sešitových románových edic 30. a 40. let 20. století (in Czech). Praha: Karolinum. ISBN 978-80-246-0640-8.
- Literární brak: operace vyloučení, operace nahrazení, 1938-1951. Brno, Host 2004. ISBN 80-7294-129-1
- Sedm století Slavětína: malá knížka k velkému výročí obce (with Hana Dočekalová et al.). Slavětín, Obec Slavětín 2014. ISBN 978-80-260-6161-8
- V obecném zájmu. Cenzura a sociální regulace literatury v moderní české kultuře, 1749-2014 (with Michael Wögerbauer, Petr Píša, Petr Šámal et al.). Praha, Academia - Ústav pro českou literaturu AV ČR, 2015. ISBN 978-80-200-2491-6
