= Lycée français de Prague =

- Francouzské lyceum v Praze
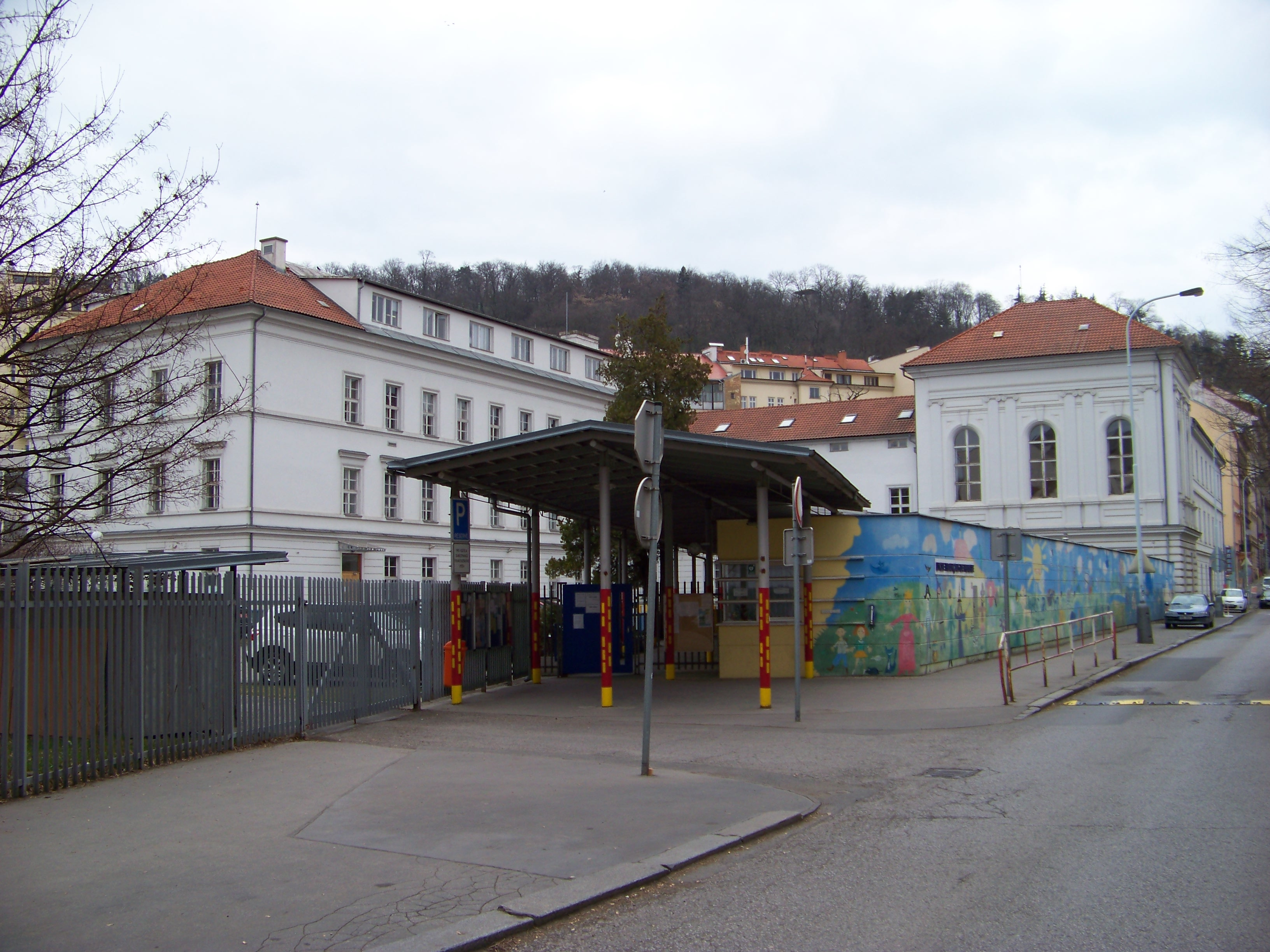

Location
- Drtinova 7, Smíchov, Praha 5, 150 00; Prague; Czech Republic
- Coordinates: 50.0765°N 14.4014°E

Information
- Type: French international school
- Website: lfp.cz

Lycée français de Prague (LFP, Czech: Francouzské gymnázium v Praze) is a French international school in Smíchov, District 5, Prague, Czech Republic. The school covers pre-maternelle (before preschool), until lycée (senior high school).

It is directly operated by the Agency for French Education Abroad (AEFE), an agency of the French government.

== See also ==
- Czech Republic–France relations
- Embassy of France, Prague
