= Voyen Koreis =

Czech-Australian author, publicist and translator

Voyen Koreis (14 February 1943, London - 16 June 2022, Brisbane, Australia), also Vojen Korejs, was a Czech-Australian author, publicist, translator, visual artist, illustrator and designer.

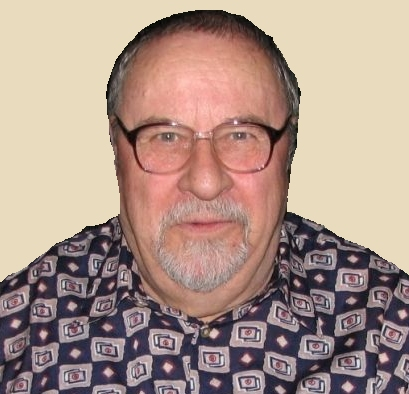
Voyen Koreis on his 70th birthday (2013)

== Biography ==
Voyen Koreis was born at Pitt Street, near Kensington Palace in London. He died in his home in Brisbane on 16 June 2022. His father, Dalibor Korejs, was before the Second World War an employee of the Czechoslovak Foreign Ministry. During the war, as a Major of the Czechoslovak Army Abroad based in UK, he took part in several war missions in Africa and in Yugoslavia. In 1947-48 he was a trade attaché in Belgrade, in 1948 he was named Consul General in Berlin, where he died in 1950.

After his father's death Koreis lived with his mother Antonie Korejsová in Prague. In 1953 they moved to Rokytnice in the Giant Mountains. He attended the Grammar School in Jilemnice. In 1962 he commenced compulsory army service, and became a singer with the Army Entertainment Unit in Prague, where he met with a number of future personalities of the Czech cultural scene. After the army stint he moved to Karlovy Vary (Carlsbad), where he first worked as a stage hand in the town theatre, and later was active as a singer and actor with a cabaret group, before moving to Prague. He began to study operatic singing with Prof Jelena Holečková-Dolanská, intending to continue studying at the Prague Academy. However, after the invasion of Czechoslovakia by the Warsaw Pact Armies in 1968 he decided to move to Great Britain in 1969.

He changed the spelling of his name to Voyen Koreis, in order to make it more pronounceable for English speakers. With his Czech-born wife whom he had met in England, he migrated to Australia in 1973 and has since been living in Brisbane. In Australia he made a living first as a storeman, salesman, later as antiquarian bookseller, while also working for the government as interpreter and translator. He helped to found an ethnic radio station, where he had led the broadcasting in Czech, also moderating some English programmes. Koreis was also active as a journalist, as well as the station administrator, programming co-ordinator, vice-president and acting president. He also made a brief foray into the theatre, appearing as Ubu the King in the famous play by Alfred Jarry, at the Cement Box and La Boite theatres in Brisbane.

In Australia Koreis also became a visual artist, having held several one-man-shows as painter and ceramic sculptor. After the fall of the Communist regime in Czechoslovakia - soon to become the Czech Republic - he made several trips there, coming back with commissions for translating TV programmes, both into the Czech and English languages. This made him concentrate more on writing and translating. Koreis' short works, essays and columns, had begun to appear in the Czech Internet journals since 1996 and are still being published now. He has translated and published works by some Czech authors, including those of the brothers Josef and Karel Čapek, and has written several books in English.

More recently Koreis has written mostly in Czech, concentrating mainly on esoteric subjects, and he has published several books, while also designing and maintaining web forums. He has also produced radio programmes for the Czech classical music station Vltava. Most of Voyen Koreis' works are available on the Internet, in traditional book form and as e-books.

== Books in Czech ==
=== In English ===
- The Fools' Pilgrimage – ISBN 9780980382501
- The Kabbalah - a timeless philosophy of life - ISBN 9780980382556
- Asylum Seekers in Heaven — a satirical novel – ISBN 9780980382594
- Golf Jokes and Anecdotes From Around the World – ISBN 9780980382525
- Meetings With Remarkable People ISBN 9780987198259
- Reinkarnace a věčný poutník - ISBN 978-0-9871982-7-3
- Bláznova cesta
- Kabala: nadčasová filosofie života ISBN 978-0-9803825-8-7
- Poutníci v čase ISBN 978-0-9803825-7-0
- Blavatská a theosofie ISBN 978-0-9871982-0-4
- Můj bíbr: Memoáry ISBN 978-0-9871982-1-1
- Hledači azylu v nebi: Mefisto a Feles ISBN 978-0-9871982-2-8
- Valentýn na Tasmánii ISBN 978-0-9871982-6-6
- Společnost Ardenského lesa ISBN 978-0-9871982-9-7
- Tuláci: docela seriózní komedie ISBN 978-0-6488074-2-1

== Plays and scripts ==
- Struggle of the Magicians — radio play
- Mephisto and Pheles – stage play ISBN 9780980382563
- Mephisto and Pheles — radio play
- Kafka Dances by Timothy Daly ─ Kafka tančí - stage play (translator)
- Intrusion - stage play (in English) - ISBN 978-0-9871982-4-2
- S upřímností nejdál dojdeš (Oscar Wilde: The Importance of Being Earnest) - transl. and editor, ISBN 978-0-9871982-8-0
- Ernest - The Musical (ISBN 978-0-6488074-0-7)
- Ernest - muzikál (ISBN 978-0-6488074-1-4)
- An Introduction to the Study of the Tarot by P. F. Case (edit. V. Koreis) ISBN 9780980382549
- The Tales of Doggie and Moggie by Josef Čapek – Povídání o pejskovi a kočičce (trans. & edit. V. Koreis) ISBN 9780980382532
- R.U.R. (Rossum's Universal Robots) by Karel Čapek (trans. & edit. V. Koreis) ISBN 9780980382518
- The Robber by Karel Čapek - Loupežník (trans. & edit. V. Koreis) ISBN 9780980382518
- The Raven by E. A. Poe - Krkavec (trans. & edit. V. Koreis) ISBN 9780987198235
