= Jeremy King =

American historian

Jeremy King is an American historian, Professor of History at Mount Holyoke. He was research fellow at Harvard University, Berlin Prize Fellow, from the American Academy in Berlin, and 2004–2005 Research Fellow of the American Council of Learned Societies.

He graduated from Yale University with a B.A, and from Columbia University with an MA, M.Phil., Ph.D.

He lived in Prague, Budapest, and Vienna. In the summer of 1989, he held an internship at the Hungarian Section of Radio Free Europe, in Munich.

== Works ==
- Budweisers Into Czechs and Germans: A Local History of Bohemian Politics, 1848-1948. Princeton University Press. 2005. ISBN 978-0-691-12234-2.
