= Eva Hayman =

Holocaust survivor (1924–2013)

Eva Hayman (born Diamantová), January 1, 1924, Prague, Czechoslovakia – August 22, 2013, Auckland, New Zealand) was a Holocaust survivor, diarist, and nurse. Her sister was the writer and translator Vera Gissing.

== Biography ==
When she was only 15, she was sent on a train to Britain with her sister Vera as part of the kindertransport movement, which saved many Jewish children and was organized by Nicholas Winton. Hayman said that her childhood ended the day she boarded the train and she saw children that were torn out of their parent's arms. Many older siblings had to become a parent to their younger sisters or brothers. Eva and Vera spent most of the war in Liverpool, Hastings, Monmouth, and Poole. It eventually became impossible to write letters to their parents, so Hayman began writing a diary that was later published as a book called By the Moon and the Stars.

She later discovered that both of her parents had died, her father in a concentration camp, and her mother of typhus. After the war, Hayman became a nurse and helped many people. She was featured in the 2000 film, Into the Arms of Strangers, with many other Holocaust survivors.
