= Victor Vodicka =

Australian smith

Václav (later Victor) Vodička AM DA (Prague) FRMIT MACE (28 September 1921 – 30 September 1992) was a Czech born gold and silversmith who emigrated to Australia in 1950 and taught at the Royal Melbourne Institute of Technology (RMIT) from 1955 to 1983. It has been said that 'his contribution to Australian jewellery was made as the lecturer in charge of gold and silversmithing in Australia'.

== Early life and education ==
Vodička was born in Modřany, a southern Prague neighbourhood in Czechoslovakia. After attending the local primary and secondary schools, in 1941 he graduated from Prague College of Industrial Arts, specialising in gold and silver design and manufacturing. He later attended the prestigious State School of Jewellery in Turnov in 1942 and 1943.

After graduating, he worked for a large firm of gold and silversmiths in Prague before moving to Jablonec nad Nisou (Gablonz an der Neiße) in 1946 as the national manager/designer of the Robert Scholtze company, an expropriated Sudeten German costume jewellery manufacturing company. He also freelanced as a jeweller and lectured part-time at the Jablonec School of Applied Arts at this time.

== Immigration to Australia ==
After the Second World War, Vodička was active in democratic politics, supporting President Edvard Beneš and his Czech National Social Party (Czech: Česká strana národně sociální, ČSNS) in the only free post-war elections in Czechoslovakia (until 1990) in May 1946. When the political situation deteriorated in Czechoslovakia following the communist coup in February 1948, he fled Czechoslovakia, 'illegally' leaving the country for Germany in September 1949 and made his way to the British occupation zone in Berlin. Branded an 'enemy of the people's government' and charged with bogus crimes, he would not be permitted to return to Czechoslovakia until the late 1980s.

Vodička spent Christmas 1949 in Charlottenburg, Berlin with fellow Czech refugees and then made his way to Friedland Refugee Camp where he was officially granted political refugee status under the auspices of the International Refugee Organisation. In mid-January 1950, he moved to the Fallingbostel Displaced Persons Camp for the purposes of emigrating to Australia. In March 1950, he went by train to the Bagnoli Displaced Persons Camp in Italy and on 31 March 1950 left Naples on the USAT General M. L. Hersey with 1,335 other European refugees bound for Australia, arriving in Melbourne on 27 April 1950. After arriving in Australia, he spent about three weeks at the Bonegilla Migrant Camp before returning to Melbourne to take up work.

== Career ==
In the first few years after arriving in Australia, Vodička had a number of jobs, mainly as a silversmith at a range of companies. Early on, he began using a name Australians could pronounce and became known as Victor or Vic Vodicka rather than Václav Vodička. When he applied for the position of instructor in gold and silversmithing at Royal Melbourne Technical College, later RMIT University, he used the name Victor Vaclav Vodicka - he was appointed in August 1955.

In the succeeding years, Vodicka 'transformed gold and silversmithing at RMIT into the leading course of its kind in Australia'. His vision 'right from the beginning...[was] to develop and build up a School of Gold and Silversmithing or at least Department...which would have silversmithing, jewellery, engraving, enamelling and gem cutting and possibly gem engraving divisions'. Vodicka’s first Diploma students graduated in 1957 and in 1958, Emily Hope. the daughter of poet, A.D. Hope, and Margaret Goldthorpe became the first women to enroll full time into the course.

Between 1962 and 1964 Vodicka doubled the intake of students, while reducing the numbers of part timers with the ambition and standard of work produced by the students leapt ahead. Throughout the 1960s, Vodicka expanded the course with more specialised subjects: design in 1963 and history of gold and silversmithing in 1964.

In 1962, W.E. McMillan, a friend and admirer of Vodicka’s work at RMIT, instituted an acquisitive award for outstanding student work and in 1966 Vodicka held a student competition to design a medal for the winner of the McMillan prize. The W.E. McMillan Collection inspired other acquisitive awards and together they represent a unique record of almost 60 years of student work at RMIT. Students were also encouraged to enter the Made in Australia Awards.

Over the years, Vodicka kept up with contemporary gold and silversmithing and maintained a small practice undertaking commissions for RMIT and external clients and during the 1970s, he was commissioned by the Commonwealth government to research the viability of replicating his model in other Australian states. The result was that a generation of new courses in gold and silversmithing were initiated around the country. He retired from RMIT in 1983 and in 1987 was honoured as a Member of the Order of Australia for his service to the craft of gold and silversmithing.

== Personal life and interests ==
In 1953, Vodicka married an Australian and was naturalised as an Australian citizen in 1956. In the late 1950s, Vodicka renewed another passion from his native home when he was introduced to the pleasures of skiing and bushwalking in the Australian high country by fellow RMIT lecturer and Second World War artist, R.W. (Bill) Rowed. In 1959, Rowed took Vodicka to the Wangaratta Ski Club, which has its lodge at Mount St. Bernard near Mount Hotham in the Victorian Alps and he joined it shortly afterwards in 1960. Both men were foundation members of the Mount Bogong Club, which was formed in 1965 to promote the safe recreational use of Mount Bogong.

During the 1960s, Vodicka, by then a father of three young children all born in the mid to late 1950s, continued with his education, completing a Tertiary Technical Teachers Certificate in 1963 and a Fellowship Diploma in Art/Industrial Design - Gold and Silversmithing from RMIT in 1967. He was an active member of the Czech community in Melbourne being a co-founder of the Czech Language School established at the Technical Teachers College, Toorak in 1963. He was also a regular visitor to the Sumava Centre (now Sumava Peksa Centre) at Belgrave in the Dandenong Ranges, founded by the exiled priest Josef Peksa, and was involved in the Czechoslovak National Association and the Prahran Slavia soccer club. Vodicka retained his interest in democratic politics in Australia and was the Foundation President of the Clarinda Branch of the Australian Labor Party and Vice President of the Hotham Electorate Assembly for the ALP in 1989.

Vodicka eventually returned to his native Czechoslovakia in 1987 after the communist regime withdrew the bogus criminal charges laid nearly forty years earlier. He visited again in 1991 after the collapse of communism in November 1989 and even got back his long withheld Czech passport. In September 1992 he died in Melbourne due to acute myeloid leukemia. At his request, his ashes were spread on his beloved Mount Bogong.
