= Czechs =

West Slavic ethnic group

Czech: Češi

Total population
- c. 10–12 million (including Moravians and Czech Silesians)

Regions with significant populations
- Czech Republic 6,732,104 (Note: This number is a lower estimate, as 2,742,669 people opted out declaring ethnicity in 2011, vast majority of whom were ethnic Czechs as the figure from the 2001 census would suggest, where there were 9.25 million Czechs, excluding Moravians (9.8 million with them included).)-9,246,784 out of a total population of around 10,900,000. Czech Republic’s total population is 99.6% European (white) and 0.4% other minorities. (2026)

Significant diasporic populations in:
- United States: 1,462,000
- Germany: 210,000
- Canada: 104,580
- Slovakia: 89,000
- Austria: 65,000
- United Kingdom: 45,000
- Argentina: 40,000
- Australia: 23,000
- Switzerland: 16,000
- France: 15,000
- Russia: 11,000
- Italy: 11,000
- Israel: 8,000
- Poland: 7,818
- Brazil: 5,000
- Romania: 2,477
- Portugal: 736
- South Korea: 518
- Turkey: 354–2,000
- Ukraine: 5,917-11,000

Languages
- Czech

Religion
- Traditionally Christian (Majority Roman Catholic, minority Protestant and Eastern Orthodox); Predominantly irreligious (particularly Atheist and Agnostic)

Related ethnic groups
- Other West Slavs (Moravians, Poles, Chodové, Slovaks, Silesians and Sorbs)

The Czechs (Czech: Češi, pronounced [ˈtʃɛʃɪ]; singular Czech, masculine: Čech [ˈtʃɛx], singular feminine: Češka [ˈtʃɛʃka]), or the Czech people (Český lid), are a West Slavic ethnic group and nation native to the Czech Republic in Central Europe. They share a common culture, ancestry, history, and speak the Czech language.

Ethnic Czechs were called Bohemians in English until the early 20th century, referring to the former name of their country, Bohemia, which in turn was adapted from the late Iron Age tribe of Celtic Boii. During the migration period, West Slavs of Bohemia settled in the area, assimilated the remaining population, and formed a principality which in the late 9th century, initially part of Great Moravia, became known as the Duchy of Bohemia and later Kingdom of Bohemia, the predecessors of the modern republic.

The Czech diaspora is found in notable numbers in the United States, Germany, Canada, Slovakia, Austria, the United Kingdom, Argentina, Australia, Switzerland, France, Russia, Italy, Israel, Brazil, and Romania among others.

== Ethnology ==
The Czech ethnic group is part of the West Slavic subgroup of the larger Slavic ethno-linguistical group. The West Slavs have their origin in early Slavic tribes which settled in Central Europe after East Germanic tribes had left this area during the migration period. The West Slavic tribe of Czechs settled in the area of Bohemia during the migration period, and assimilated the remaining Celtic and Germanic populations. In the 9th century the Duchy of Bohemia, under the Přemyslid dynasty, was formed, which had been part of Great Moravia under Svatopluk I. According to mythology, the founding father of the Czech people was Forefather Čech, who according to legend brought the tribe of Czechs into its land.

The Czechs are closely related to the neighbouring Slovaks (with whom they constituted Czechoslovakia 1918–1939, 1945–1992). The Czech–Slovak languages form a dialect continuum rather than being two clearly distinct languages. Czech cultural influence in Slovak culture is noted as having been much higher than the other way around. Czech (Slavic) people have a long history of coexistence with the Germanic people. In the 17th century, German replaced Czech in central and local administration; upper classes in Bohemia and Moravia were Germanized, and espoused a political identity (Landespatriotismus), while Czech ethnic identity survived among the lower and lower-middle classes. The Czech National Revival took place in the 18th and 19th centuries aiming to revive Czech language, culture and national identity. The Czechs were the initiators of Pan-Slavism.

The Czech ethnonym (archaic Čechové) was the name of a Slavic tribe in central Bohemia that subdued the surrounding tribes in the late 9th century and created the Czech/Bohemian state. The origin of the name of the tribe itself is unknown. According to legend, it comes from their leader Čech, who brought them to Bohemia. The exact etymology of Čech is uncertain, with most common derivation relating it to the root čel- (member of the people, kinsman). The Czech ethnonym was adopted by the Moravians in the 19th century.

== Genetics ==
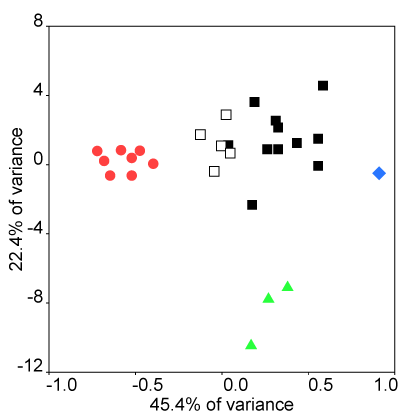
Distribution of populations in selected nations according to their Haplogroup frequencies, American Journal of Physical Anthropology, 2007 Czech samples German samples Polish samples Italian samples Balkan samples

Czechs, like most Europeans, largely descend from three distinct lineages: Mesolithic hunter-gatherers, descended from a Cro-Magnon population that arrived in Europe about 45,000 years ago, Neolithic farmers who migrated from Anatolia during the Neolithic Revolution 9,000 years ago, and Yamnaya steppe pastoralists who expanded into Europe from the Pontic–Caspian steppe in the context of Indo-European migrations 5000 years ago.

The population of the Czech lands has been influenced by different human migrations that wide-crossed Europe over time. In their Y-DNA haplogroups, which are inherited along the male line, Czechs have shown a mix of Eastern and Western European traits. Studies on 1750 and 257 samples found out frequenices of R1a (34.2-36.94%), R1b (24.78%-28.0%), I2 (11.3%), I1 (8.33%), E (5.1-6.63%), G (5.1%), J2 (3.5%), J1 (0-2%), and N (1.6%). The haplogroup R1a is predominantly represented by its more Western Slavic clade R1a-M458 (>30%) as more Eastern Slavic clade R-M558 is in a small minority (<6%). Based on haplotype similarity, Czechs are most similar to neighboring Slovaks, but although "a sharp genetic border was found between Poland and Germany, the frequency distribution of haplotypes in the Czech Republic and its neighbours resembles far more a smooth cline than a sharp border". A mtDNA study of 179 individuals from Western Bohemia showed that 3% had East Eurasian lineages that perhaps entered the gene pool through admixture with Central Asian nomadic tribes in the early Middle Ages.

== History ==
Duchy of Bohemia, the early form of the Czech state pictured in the 11th century within the Holy Roman Empire

The population of the Czech Republic descends from diverse peoples of Slavic, Celtic and Germanic origin. Presence of West Slavs in the 6th century during the Migration Period has been documented on the Czech territory. Slavs settled in Bohemia, Moravia and Austria sometime during the 6th or 7th centuries, and "assimilated the remaining Celtic and Germanic populations". According to a popular myth, the Slavs came with Forefather Čech who settled at the Říp Mountain.

During the 7th century, the Frankish merchant Samo, supporting the Slavs fighting against nearby settled Avars, became the ruler of the first known Slav state in Central Europe, Samo's Empire. The principality Great Moravia, controlled by the Moymir dynasty, arose in the 8th century and reached its zenith in the 9th (during the reign of Svatopluk I of Moravia) when it held off the influence of the Franks. Great Moravia was Christianized, the crucial role played Byzantine mission of Cyril and Methodius. The Duchy of Bohemia emerged in the late 9th century. In 880, Prague Castle was constructed by Prince Bořivoj, founder of the Přemyslid dynasty and the city of Prague was established. Vratislav II was the first Czech king in 1085 and the duchy was raised to a hereditary kingdom under Ottokar I in 1198.

The second half of the 13th century was a period of advancing German immigration into the Czech lands. The number of Czechs who have at least partly German ancestry today probably runs into hundreds of thousands. The Habsburg Monarchy focused much of its power on religious wars against the Protestants. While these religious wars were taking place, the Czech estates revolted against Habsburg from 1546 to 1547 but were ultimately defeated.

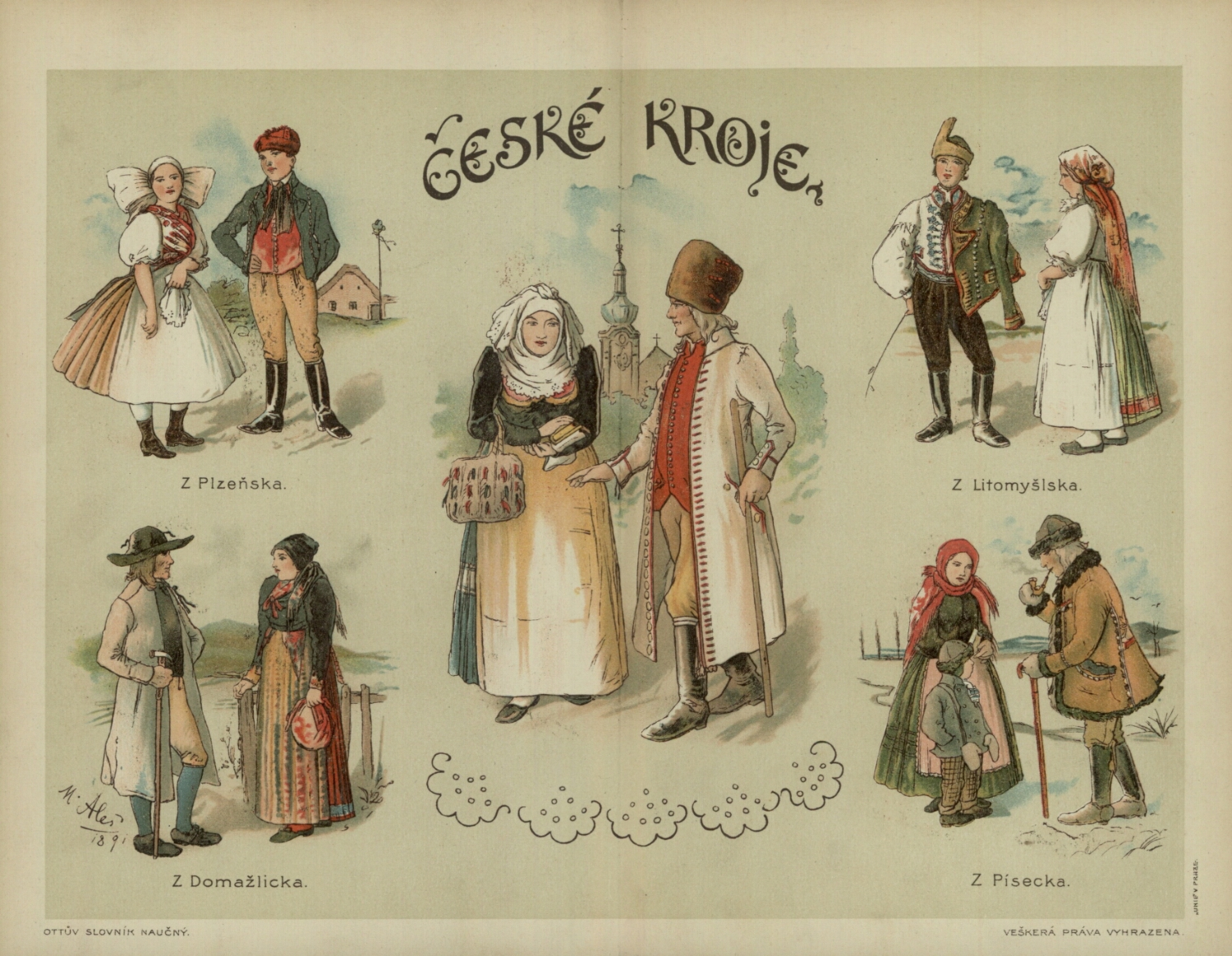
Czech traditional costumes

Defenestrations of Prague in 1618, signaled an open revolt by the Bohemian estates against the Habsburgs and started the Thirty Years' War. After the Battle of White Mountain in 1620, all Czech lands were declared hereditary property of the Habsburg family. The German language was made equal to the Czech language.

Czech patriotic authors tend to call the following period, from 1620 to 1648 until the late 18th century, the "Dark Age". It is characterized by devastation by foreign troops; Germanization; and economic and political decline. It is estimated that the population of the Czech lands declined by a third.

The 18th and 19th century is characterized by the Czech National Revival, focusing to revive Czech culture and national identity.

Since the turn of the 20th century, Chicago is the city with the third largest Czech population, after Prague and Vienna.

During World War I, Czechoslovak Legions fought in France, Italy and Russia against the Central Powers. In 1918 the independent state of Czechoslovakia was proclaimed. Czechs formed the leading class in the new state emerging from the remnants of the Austrian-Hungarian Monarchy.

After 1933, Czechoslovakia remained the only democracy in central and eastern Europe. However, in 1938 the Munich Agreement severed the Sudetenland, with a considerable Czech minority, from Czechoslovakia, and in 1939 the German Nazi regime established the Protectorate of Bohemia and Moravia for Resttschechei (the rump Czech state). Emil Hácha became president of the protectorate under Nazi domination, which only allowed pro-Nazi Czech associations and tended to stress ties of the Czechs with the Bohemian Germans and other parts of the German people, in order to facilitate assimilation by Germanization. In Lidice, Ležáky and Javoříčko the Nazi authorities committed war crimes against the local Czech population. On 2 May 1945, the Prague Uprising reached its peak, supported by the Russian Liberation Army. The post-war expulsion of Germans from Czechoslovakia and the immediate reprisals against Germans and Nazi collaborators by Czech resistance and the Czechoslovak state authorities, made Czechs—especially in the early 1950s—settle alongside Slovaks and Romani people in the former lands of the Sudeten Germans, who had been deported to East Germany, West Germany and Austria according to the Potsdam Conference and Yalta Conference.

The Warsaw Pact invasion of Czechoslovakia in 1968 was followed by a wave of emigration, unseen before and stopped shortly after in 1969 (estimate: 70,000 immediately, 300,000 in total), typically of highly qualified people.

Tens of thousands of Czechs had repatriated from Volhynia and Banat after World War II. Since the 1990s, the Czech Republic has been working to repatriate Romania and Kazakhstan's ethnic Czechs.

== Notable people ==
Areas where Czech language is spoken

=== Historical figures ===
The last five Přemyslids were kings: Ottokar I of Bohemia, Wenceslaus I of Bohemia, Ottokar II of Bohemia, Wenceslaus II of Bohemia and Wenceslaus III of Bohemia. The most successful and influential of all Czech kings was Charles IV, who also became the Holy Roman Emperor. The Luxembourg dynasty represents the heights of Czech (Bohemian) statehood territorial and influence as well as advancement in many areas of human endeavors.

Many people are considered national heroes and cultural icons, many national stories concern their lives. Jan Hus was a religious reformist from the 15th century and spiritual father of the Hussite Movement. Jan Žižka and Prokop the Great were leaders of hussite army, George of Poděbrady was a hussite king. Albrecht von Wallenstein was a notable military leader during the Thirty Years' War. The teacher of nations Jan Amos Komenský is also considered a notable figure in Czech history. Joseph Radetzky von Radetz was an Austrian general staff during the later period of the Napoleonic Wars. Josef Jungmann is often credited for expanding the modern Czech language, and preventing its extinction. The most famous Czech historian was František Palacký, often-called "father of nation".

=== Modern politicians ===
One of the most notable figures are founders of Czechoslovakia, modern state of independence of Czech and Slovak nations, Presidents Tomáš Garrigue Masaryk and Edvard Beneš, who was also leader of exile government in World War II. Ludvík Svoboda was a head of the Czechoslovak military units on the Eastern Front during the World War II (later president of Czechoslovakia). The key figures of the Communist regime were Klement Gottwald, Antonín Zápotocký, Antonín Novotný (and Slovak Gustáv Husák), the most famous victims of this regime were Milada Horáková and Rudolf Slánský. Jan Palach committed self-immolation as a political protest against the end of the Prague Spring resulting from the 1968 invasion of Czechoslovakia by the Warsaw Pact armies.

Another notable politician after the fall of the communist regime is Václav Havel, last President of Czechoslovakia and first President of the Czech Republic. The first directly elected president is Miloš Zeman.

The Czech Republic has had multiple Prime Ministers, the first of which were future presidents Václav Klaus and Miloš Zeman. Other Prime Ministers of the Czech Republic were conservative politicians, such as Mirek Topolánek, Petr Nečas, and social democratic such as Vladimír Špidla, Jiří Paroubek, Bohuslav Sobotka.

Diplomat Madeleine Albright was of Czech origin and spoke Czech. Other well-known Czech diplomats were Jan Masaryk or Jiří Dienstbier.

=== Science ===
Czechs established themselves mainly in Biology, Chemistry, Philology and Egyptology.

- Chemistry – Jaroslav Heyrovský (Nobel Prize 1959), Otto Wichterle, Zdenko Hans Skraup, Antonín Holý
- Biology – Johann Gregor Mendel, Jan Evangelista Purkyně, Carl Borivoj Presl, Jan Svatopluk Presl, Karel Domin, Kaspar Maria von Sternberg, Friedrich von Berchtold, Ferdinand Stoliczka, Wenceslas Bojer, Alberto Vojtěch Frič, August Carl Joseph Corda
- Mathematics – Bernard Bolzano, Eduard Čech, Miroslav Katětov, Petr Vopěnka, Václav Chvátal, Otakar Borůvka, Vojtěch Jarník, Kurt Gödel
- Physics and engineering – Ignaz von Born, František Běhounek, Jan Marek Marci, Josef Ressel, František Křižík, Vincenc Strouhal, Prokop Diviš, František Josef Gerstner, Ernst Mach
- Astronomy – Antonín Mrkos, Antonín Bečvář
- Astronautics – Vladimír Remek
- Philology – Bedřich Hrozný, Josef Dobrovský, Josef Jungmann, Vilém Mathesius, Julius Pokorny, René Wellek, Jan Mukařovský
- Medicine – Carl von Rokitansky, Joseph Škoda, Jan Janský
- Archeology – Pavel Pavel, Lubor Niederle, Karel Absolon, Miroslav Verner
- Anthropology and ethnography – Aleš Hrdlička, Emil Holub, Alois Musil
- History – František Palacký, Bohuslav Balbín, Konstantin Jireček, Max Dvořák, Miroslav Hroch
- Philosophy – Edmund Husserl, Jan Patočka, Karel Kosík, Egon Bondy, Ladislav Klíma
- Psychology – Max Wertheimer, Stanislav Grof
- Theology – Jan Hus, Jerome of Prague, Jan Želivský, Petr Chelčický, Jan Rokycana, Josef Hromádka, Tomáš Špidlík, Tomáš Halík
- Pedagogy – Jan Amos Komenský
- Folklorists – František Ladislav Čelakovský, Karel Jaromír Erben
- Literary theory – Karel Teige, Pavel Janáček

=== Sports ===
Sports have also been a contributor to famous Czechs especially tennis, football, hockey, and athletics:

- Tennis – Jaroslav Drobný, Jan Kodeš, Martina Navrátilová, Ivan Lendl, Hana Mandlíková, Jana Novotná, Helena Suková, Petr Korda, Petra Kvitová, Tomáš Berdych, Karolína Plíšková, Barbora Krejčíková
- Football – Oldřich Nejedlý, Antonín Puč, František Plánička, Josef Bican, Josef Masopust, Ivo Viktor, Antonín Panenka, Zdeněk Nehoda, Tomáš Skuhravý, Pavel Nedvěd, Karel Poborský, Jan Koller, Milan Baroš, Marek Jankulovski, Vladimír Šmicer, Tomáš Rosický, Petr Čech
- Hockey – Jaromír Jágr, Dominik Hašek, Vladimír Růžička, Jiří Šlégr, Ivan Hlinka, Jiří Holeček, Jaroslav Pouzar, Jiří Hrdina, Petr Sýkora, Patrik Eliáš, Bobby Holík, Michal Rozsíval, Milan Hejduk, Petr Nedvěd, Martin Straka, Václav Prospal, Jakub Voráček, Tomáš Plekanec, František Kaberle, David Výborný, Pavel Patera, Martin Procházka, David Krejčí, David Pastrňák, Filip Chytil
- Athletics – Emil Zátopek, Dana Zátopková, Jarmila Kratochvílová, Roman Šebrle, Jan Železný, Barbora Špotáková
- Gymnastics – Věra Čáslavská, Eva Bosáková, Vlasta Děkanová, Hana Říčná, Věra Černá
- Chess – Wilhelm Steinitz, Věra Menčíková, Richard Réti, Salo Flohr, David Navara
- Others – Martina Sáblíková, Martin Doktor, Štěpánka Hilgertová, Josef Holeček, Kateřina Neumannová, Filip Jícha, Jiří Zídek Sr., Jan Veselý, Ester Ledecká

=== The arts ===
==== Music ====
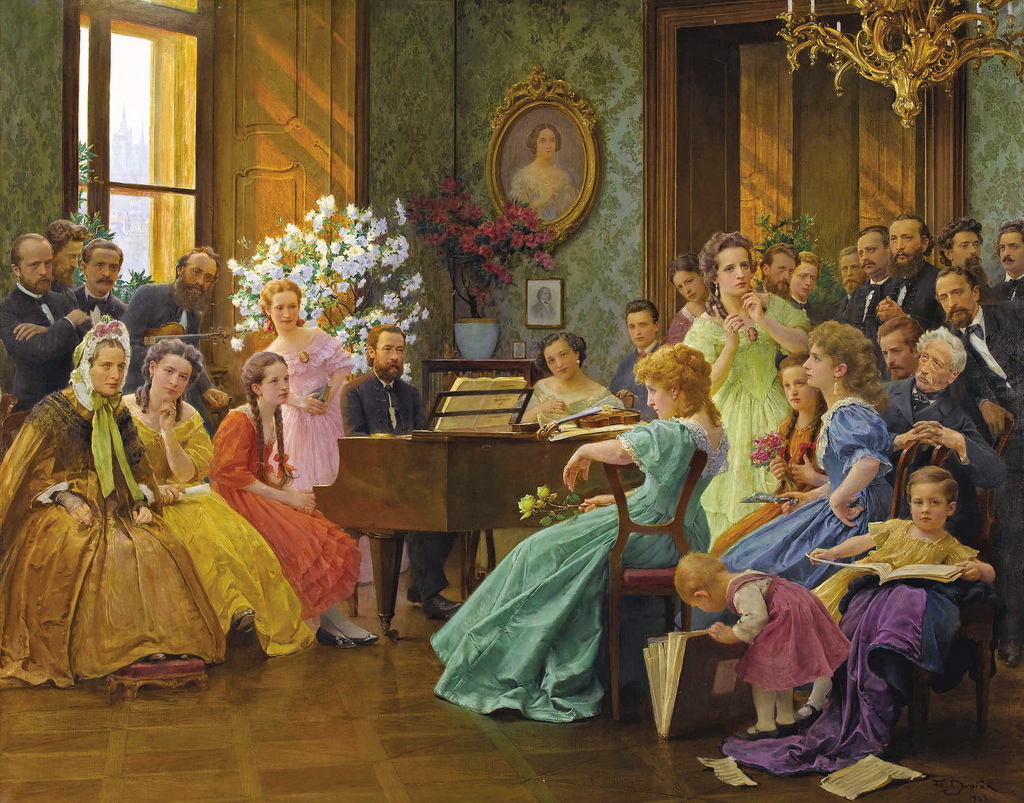
Bedřich Smetana Among his Friends, 1865; oil painting by František Dvořák

Czech music had its first significant pieces created in the 11th century. The great progress of Czech artificial music began with the end of the Renaissance and the early Baroque era, concretely in works of Adam Václav Michna z Otradovic, where the specific character of Czech music was rising up by using the influence of genuine folk music. This tradition determined the development of Czech music and has remained the main sign in the works of great Czech composers of almost all eras – Jan Dismas Zelenka and Josef Mysliveček in Baroque, Bedřich Smetana and Antonín Dvořák in Romanticism, Leoš Janáček, Bohuslav Martinů and Josef Suk in modern classical or Petr Eben and Miloslav Kabeláč in contemporary classical music.

Czech musicians also played an important role in the development of European music. Jan Václav Antonín Stamic in 18th-century contributed to the creation of Classicism in music by innovations of compositional forms and the founding of the Mannheim school. Similarly, Antonín Rejcha's experiments prefigured new compositional techniques in the 19th century. The influence of Czech musicians expanded beyond the borders of the European continent, when Antonín Dvořák created a new American classical music style, using the richness of ethnic music of that country during his mission in the US. The contribution of Alois Hába to microtonal music in the 20th century must be also mentioned.

Czech music reached as far as Qing China. Karel Slavíček was a Jesuit missionary, scientist and sinologist who was introduced to the Kangxi Emperor on 3 February 1717, in Beijing. The emperor favored him and employed him as court musician. (Slavíček was a Spinet player).

Some notable modern Czech musicians are US-based composer and guitarist Ivan Král, musician and composer Jan Hammer and the rock band The Plastic People of the Universe which played an important part in the underground movement during the communist regime.

The Czech Republic first entered the Eurovision Song Contest in 2007. Czech performer qualified for the grand final for the first time in 2016 when singer Gabriela Gunčíková finished in 25th place. In 2018 the singer Mikolas Josef reached the 6th place in the contest being the best result of the Czech Republic until today.

Other important names: Franz Benda, Rafael Kubelík, Jan Ladislav Dussek, Vítězslav Novák, Zdeněk Fibich, Jan Kubelík, Jiří Antonín Benda, Julius Fučík, Karel Svoboda, Karel Kryl, Václav Neumann, Václav Talich, František Xaver Richter, Jan Křtitel Vaňhal, Vojtěch Živný, Josef Bohuslav Foerster, Magdalena Kožená, Karel Ančerl, Ema Destinnová, Maria Jeritza, František Xaver Brixi, Jiří Bělohlávek, Oskar Nedbal, Karel Gott.

==== Literature ====
Jaroslav Seifert was awarded the Nobel Prize in Literature for his poetry. Božena Němcová has become a cultural icon and gained much fame for her book Babička (The Grandmother). Other important Czech writers include Milan Kundera, Karel Čapek, Jaroslav Hašek, Jan Neruda, Franz Kafka, Bohumil Hrabal, Viktor Dyk, Kosmas, Pavel Kohout, Alois Jirásek, Josef Škvorecký, Karel Jaromír Erben, Jiří Wolker, Karel Hynek Mácha, Vítězslav Nezval, Arnošt Lustig, Jaroslav Vrchlický, Karel Havlíček Borovský, Ivan Klíma, Egon Erwin Kisch, Vladimír Holan, Julius Zeyer or Svatopluk Čech. From contemporary Czech writers can be mentioned Jáchym Topol, Patrik Ouředník, Michal Viewegh or Daniela Hodrová. Important playwrights were Karel Čapek, František Langer or Josef Kajetán Tyl. Strong was also the theatrical avant-garde (Jan Werich, Jiří Voskovec, Emil František Burian). Known journalists were Julius Fučík, Milena Jesenská or Ferdinand Peroutka.

==== Visual arts ====
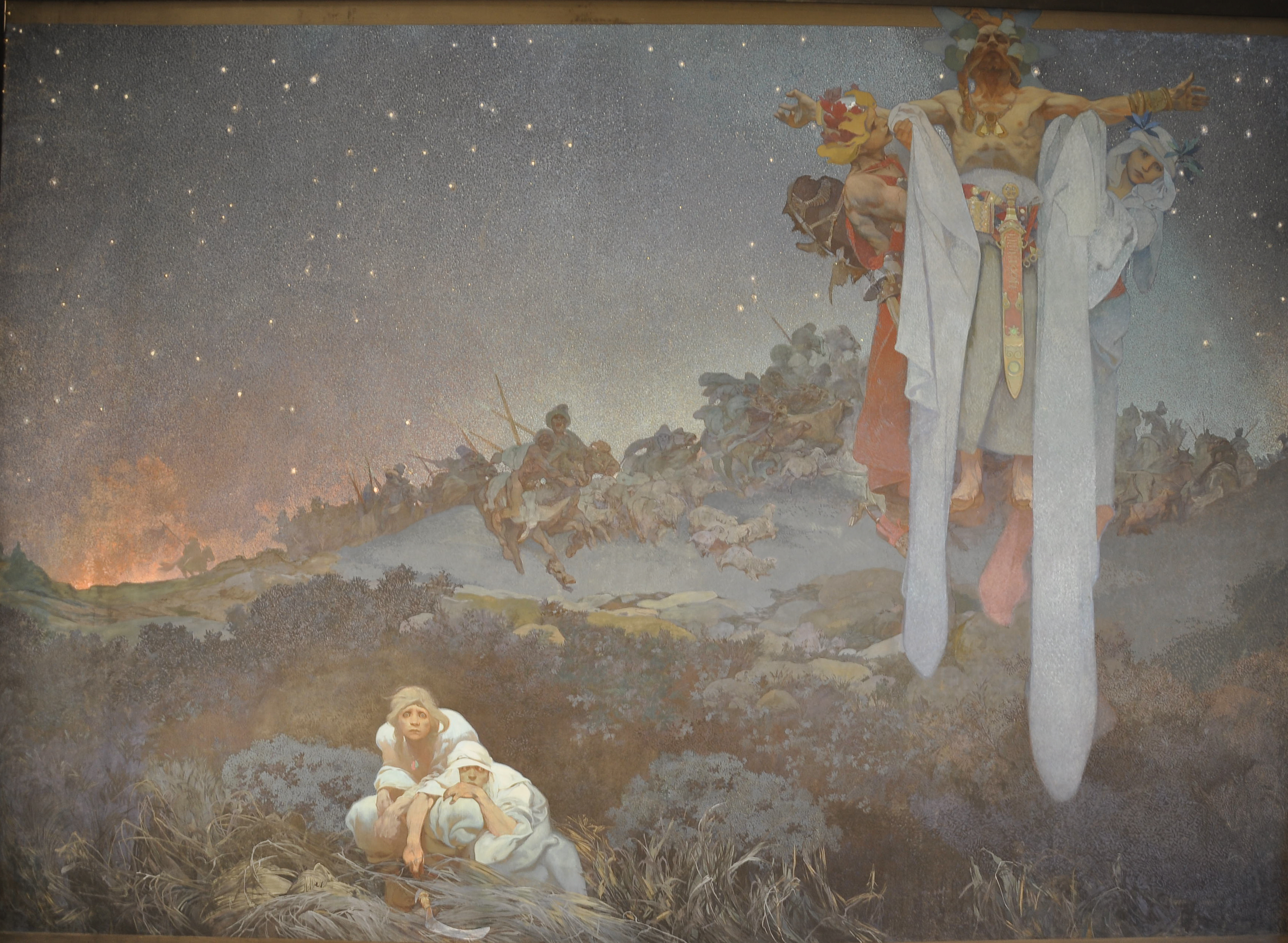
The Slav Epic by Alfons Mucha

Mikoláš Aleš was a painter, known for redesigning the Prague National Theater. Alphonse Mucha was an influential artist in the Art Nouveau movement of the Edwardian period. František Kupka was a pioneer and co-founder of the abstract art movement. Other well-known painters are Josef Čapek, Josef Lada, Theodoric of Prague, Wenceslaus Hollar, Toyen, Jan Kupecký, Petr Brandl, Vladimír Vašíček, Václav Brožík, Josef Mánes, Karel Škréta or Max Švabinský. Renowned sculptors were Josef Václav Myslbek or Matyáš Bernard Braun, photographers Jan Saudek, Josef Sudek, František Drtikol or Josef Koudelka, illustrators Zdeněk Burian or Adolf Born, architects Jan Kotěra or Josef Gočár. Jiří Kylián was an important ballet choreographer.

==== Film ====
Film director Miloš Forman, known best for his movie, One Flew over the Cuckoo's Nest is of Czech origin and started his career in Czechoslovakia. Forman was a member of the so-called Czech New Wave. Other members included Jiří Menzel (Oscar 1967), Ivan Passer, Věra Chytilová and Elmar Klos (Oscar 1965). Also the Academy Award for Best Foreign Language Film was awarded to Jan Svěrák (1996). The influential surrealist filmmaker and animator Jan Švankmajer was born in Prague and has resided in the Czech Republic throughout his life. In the field of animation and puppet film famous people include Zdeněk Miler, Karel Zeman and Jiří Trnka.

Actors Zdeněk Svěrák, Vlastimil Brodský, Vladimír Menšík, Libuše Šafránková or Karel Roden have also made a mark in modern Czech history. The most successful Czech erotic actress is Silvia Saint.

==== Modeling ====
The first Czech models have made a breakthrough in the international modeling were Paulina Porizkova or Ivana Trump. After the fall of communism in Czechoslovakia many other models succeeded: Karolína Kurková, Eva Herzigová, Taťána Kuchařová, Petra Němcová and Daniela Peštová.

=== Saints ===
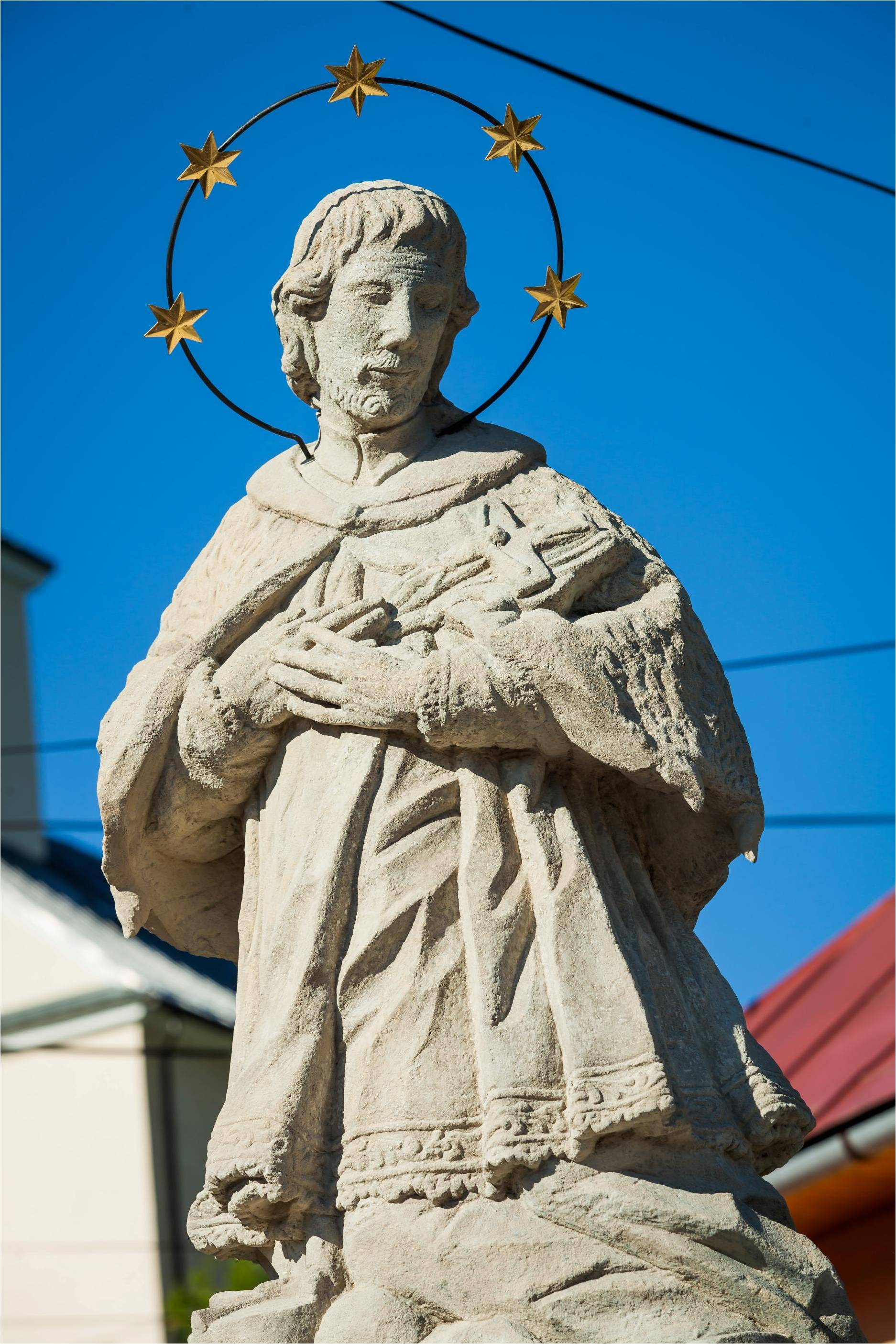
St. John of Nepomuk (Jan Nepomucký)

Czech culture involves many saints, most notably St. Wenceslaus (Václav), patron of the Czech nation, St. John of Nepomuk (Jan Nepomucký), St. Adalbert (Vojtěch), Saint Procopius or St. Agnes of Bohemia (Anežka Česká). Although not a Christian, rabbi Judah Loew ben Bezalel of Prague, a 16th Century scholar and one of the most influential figures of Jewish history, is considered to be part of the country's religious legacy as well.

=== Natives ===
The modern Czech nation was formed through the process of the Czech national revival. Through this was created the linguistic concept of the Czech nation (particularly promoted by Jungmann), i.e. "a Czech=one who has the Czech language as their first language; naturally or by choice" (that is why Slovaks who have chosen Czech as their literary language, such as Ján Kollár or Pavel Jozef Šafařík, are often considered to be Czechs). Like other nations, Czechs also speak of two alternative concepts: the landed concept (a Czech is someone who was born in the historic Czech territory), which in Jungmann's time primarily denoted nobility, and the ethnic concept. Definition by territory is still discussed alternative, from time to time is indicated for Czechs number of natives (speaking mostly German, English or otherwise) – these include US Secretary of State Madeleine Albright, film director Karel Reisz, actor Herbert Lom, the founder of psychoanalysis Sigmund Freud, the founder of genetics Gregor Mendel, logician and mathematician Kurt Gödel, the philosopher Edmund Husserl, scientists Gerty Cori, Carl Cori and Peter Grünberg (all Nobel Prize winners) and Ernst Mach, economists Joseph Schumpeter and Eugen Böhm von Bawerk, philosophers Bernard Bolzano, Ernest Gellner, Vilém Flusser and Herbert Feigl, Marxist theoretician Karl Kautsky, astronomer Johann Palisa, legal theorist Hans Kelsen, inventors Alois Senefelder and Viktor Kaplan, automotive designer Ferdinand Porsche, psychologist Max Wertheimer, a geologist Karl von Terzaghi, musicologists Eduard Hanslick and Guido Adler, chemist Johann Josef Loschmidt, biologists Heinrich Wilhelm Schott and Georg Joseph Kamel, the founder of the dermatology Ferdinand Ritter von Hebra, peace activist Bertha von Suttner (Nobel Peace Prize), the composers Gustav Mahler, Heinrich Biber, Viktor Ullmann, Ervin Schulhoff, Pavel Haas, Erich Wolfgang Korngold and Ralph Benatzky, writers Franz Kafka, Reiner Maria Rilke, Max Brod, Karl Kraus, Franz Werfel, Marie von Ebner-Eschenbach, Leo Perutz, Tom Stoppard and Egon Erwin Kisch, painters Anton Raphael Mengs and Emil Orlik, architects Adolf Loos, Peter Parler, Josef Hoffmann, Jan Santini Aichel and Kilian Ignaz Dientzenhofer, cellist David Popper, violist Heinrich Wilhelm Ernst, pianists Alice Herz-Sommer and Rudolf Serkin, president of Austria Karl Renner, Prime Minister of Poland Jerzy Buzek, industrialist Oskar Schindler, or chess player Wilhelm Steinitz.

=== Czech ancestry ===
People with Czech ancestry include the astronauts Eugene Cernan and Jim Lovell, film directors Chris Columbus and Jim Jarmusch, swimmer Katie Ledecky, politicians John Forbes Kerry and Caspar Weinberger, chemist and Nobel Prize laureate Thomas Cech, physicist Karl Guthe Jansky, economist Friedrich Hayek, painters Jan Matejko, Gustav Klimt, Egon Schiele and Oskar Kokoschka, actors Ashton Kutcher, Sissy Spacek and Kim Novak, tennis players Richard Krajicek, Jakob Hlasek and Stan Wawrinka, singer Jason Mraz, Brazil president Juscelino Kubitschek, founder of McDonald's company Ray Kroc, writers Georg Trakl and Robert Musil, mayor of Chicago Anton Cermak and Ivanka Trump and her brother Donald Trump Jr.

== Geography ==
Greater coat of arms of the Czech Republic shows symbols of historical lands Bohemia, Moravia, Silesia

The Czechs live in three historical lands: Bohemia, Moravia, and Czech Silesia; these regions make up the modern Czech Republic. However, the country is now divided into 14 administrative regions. The local culture varies somewhat in each of the historical regions. Moravians are usually more nationalistic regional patriots of Moravia, but they also speak Czech. Local dialects (such as Central Bohemian, the Chod dialect, Moravian dialects, Cieszyn Silesian, etc.) are found in various parts of the country.

== Czech language ==
The Czech language is spoken by approximately 12 million people around the world, but the vast majority are in the Czech Republic. It developed from the Proto-Slavic language in the 10th century and is mutually intelligible with the Slovak language.

== Religion ==
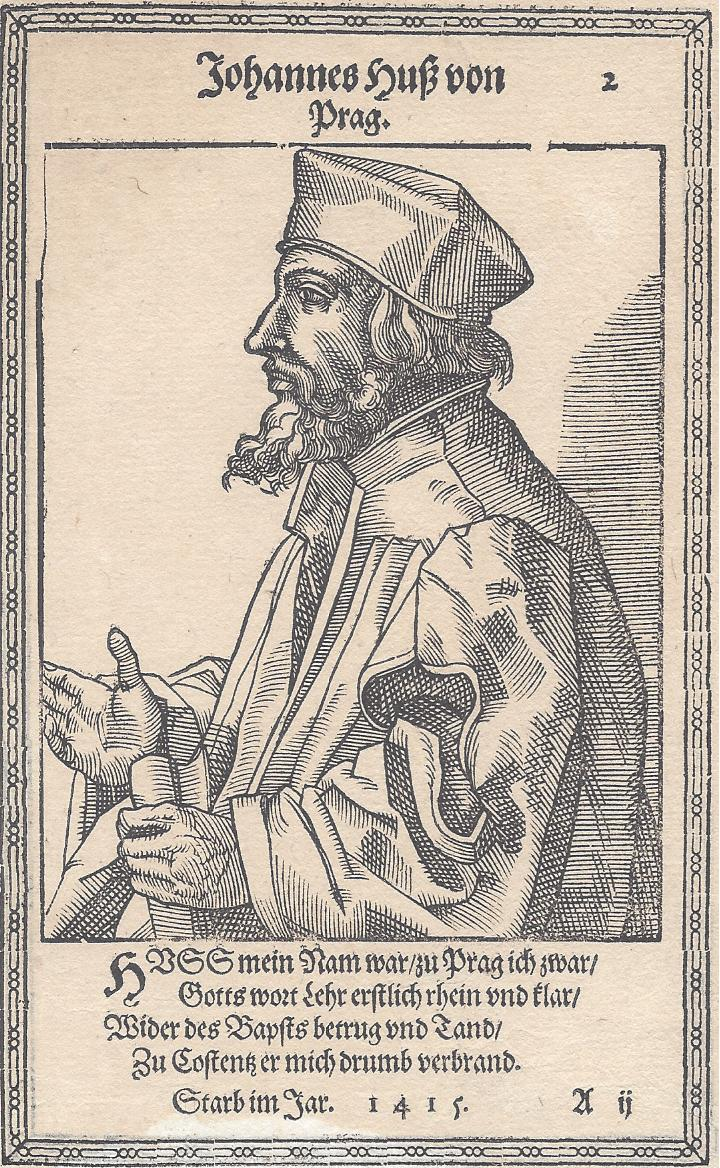
Predecessor to Protestantism, Jan Hus

In 1977, Richard Felix Staar described Czechs as "tolerant and even indifferent towards religion as a rule".

After the Bohemian Reformation, most Czechs (about 85%) became followers of Jan Hus, Petr Chelčický and other regional Protestant Reformers. Bohemian Estates' defeat in the Battle of White Mountain brought radical religious changes and started a series of intense actions taken by the Habsburgs in order to bring the Czech population back to the Roman Catholic Church. After the Habsburgs regained control of Bohemia, Czech people were forcibly converted to Roman Catholicism. All kinds of Protestant communities including the various branches of Hussites, Lutherans and Reformed were either expelled, killed, or converted to Catholicism. The Catholic Church lost the bulk of its adherents during the Communist era.

As of 2015, Pew Research Center found in that 72% of the population of Czech Republic declared to be irreligious, a category which includes atheists, agnostics and those who describe their religion as "nothing in particular", 26% were Christians (vast majority Catholics), while 2% belonged to other faiths.

== Demographics ==
In the Czech Republic, the nation state of the Czech people, 6,732,104 (63.7%) declared as ethnic Czech according to the 2011 census. Notably, another 2,742,669 (26%) were undeclared, and 522,474 (4.9%) declared as Moravians. There is a large Czech diaspora, which includes 1,703,930 Americans of Czech/Czechoslovak ancestry, 94,805 Canadians of Czech ancestry, an estimated 45,000 Czech-born residents in the United Kingdom, and ca. 31,000 in Australia. There are smaller communities throughout Europe. Number of Israelis of Czech-Jewish ancestry is estimated to be about 50,000 to 100,000.

== See also ==
- List of Czechs
- The Greatest Czech
- List of Bohemian monarchs
- List of prime ministers of the Czech Republic
- List of prime ministers of Czechoslovakia
- List of presidents of Czechoslovakia
- List of presidents of the Czech Republic

== Sources ==
- Agnew, Hugh (2004). The Czechs and the Lands of the Bohemian Crown. Hoover Press. ISBN 978-0-8179-4492-6.
- Berger, Tilman (July 2003). "Slovaks in Czechia—Czechs in Slovakia". International Journal of the Sociology of Language (162). doi:10.1515/ijsl.2003.035.
- Pánek, Jaroslav (2009). A History of the Czech Lands. Charles University. ISBN 978-80-246-1645-2.
- King, Jeremy (2005). Budweisers Into Czechs and Germans: A Local History of Bohemian Politics, 1848–1948. Princeton University Press. ISBN 0-691-12234-2.
- Wiskemann, Elizabeth (1967). Czechs & Germans: a study of the struggle in the historic provinces of Bohemia and Moravia. Royal Institute of International Affairs; Macmillan.
- Mastny, Vojtech (1971). The Czechs under Nazi Rule. Columbia University Press.
- Hermann, Adolf Hanus (1975). A History of the Czechs. Allen Lane.
- Vyšný, Paul (1977). Neo-Slavism and the Czechs 1898–1914. Cambridge University Press. ISBN 978-0-521-21230-4.
