= Outline of Canada =

Country in North America

The following outline is provided as an overview of and topical guide to Canada:

Flag

Canada is a country in North America. Its ten provinces and three territories extend from the Atlantic Ocean to the Pacific Ocean and northward into the Arctic Ocean, making it the second-largest country by total area, with the longest coastline of any country. Its border with the United States is the longest international land border. The country is characterized by a wide range of both meteorologic and geological regions. With a population of over 41 million, it has widely varying population densities, with the majority residing in its urban areas and large areas being sparsely populated. Its capital is Ottawa and its three largest metropolitan areas are Toronto, Montreal, and Vancouver.

A developed country, Canada's advanced economy has a high nominal per capita GDP globally and ranks among the largest in the world by nominal GDP, relying chiefly upon its abundant natural resources and well-developed international trade networks. Canada is recognized as a middle power; its support for multilateralism and internationalism has been closely related to its foreign policies of peacekeeping and aid for developing countries. Canada promotes its domestically shared values through participation in multiple international organizations and forums.

== General reference ==
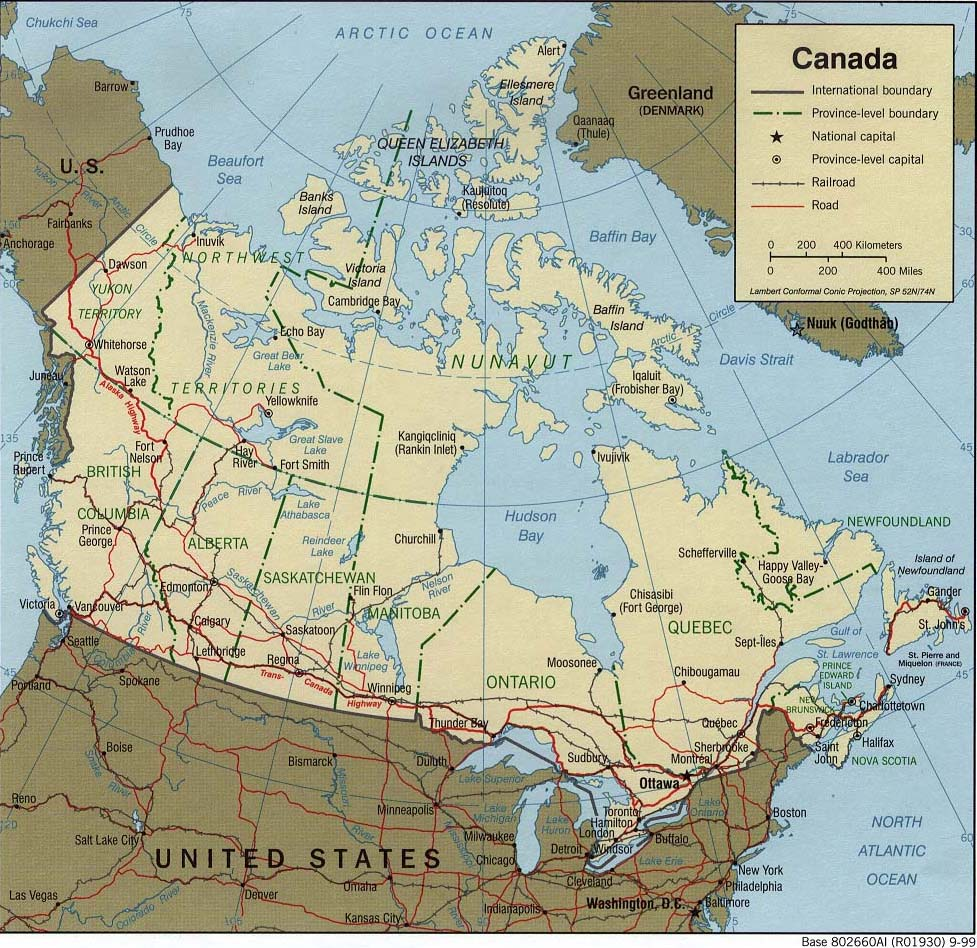
An enlargeable map of Canada

- Pronunciation /ˈkænədə/
- Common English country name: Canada
- Official English country name: Canada
- Common endonym: Canada
- Official endonym: Canada
- Adjectival: Canadian, Canada
- Demonym: Canadian (Fr. canadien)
- Etymology: Name of Canada
- Official languages : English, French
- ISO country codes: CA, CAN, 124
- ISO region codes: See ISO 3166-2:CA
- Internet country code top-level domain: .ca
- International rankings of Canada

== Geography ==
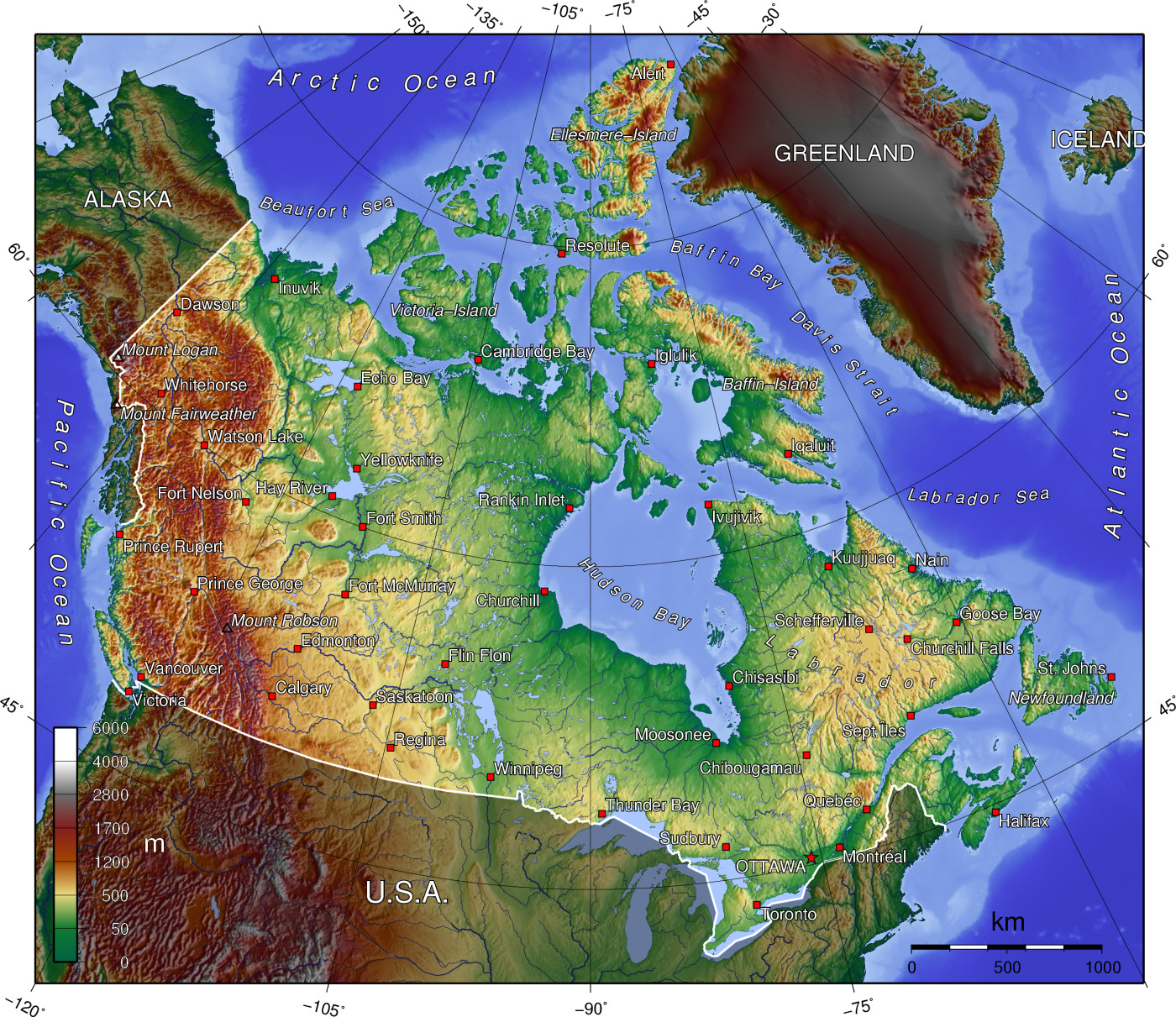

Geography of Canada

- Canada is...
  - a country
    - a nation state
    - a Commonwealth Realm
    - a federation
    - a member state of NATO
- Location:
  - Northern Hemisphere, Western Hemisphere
    - Americas
      - North America
        - Northern America
  - Time zones (Time in Canada):
    - Newfoundland Standard Time (UTC−03:30), Newfoundland Daylight Time (UTC−02:30)
    - Atlantic Standard Time (UTC−04), Atlantic Daylight Time (UTC−03)
    - Eastern Standard Time (UTC−05), Eastern Daylight Time (UTC−04)
    - Central Standard Time (UTC−06), Central Daylight Time (UTC−05)
    - Mountain Standard Time (UTC−07), Mountain Daylight Time (UTC−06)
    - Pacific Time (UTC−07), Yukon Time (UTC−07)
  - Extreme points of Canada
    - North: Cape Columbia, Nunavut – (83°08′ N, 74°13′W)
    - South: Middle Island, Ontario – (41°41′N, 82°40′W)
    - East: Cape Spear, Newfoundland – (47°31′N, 52°37′W)
    - West: Yukon-Alaska border – (141°00′W)
    - High: Mount Logan, Yukon 5,959 m (19,551 ft)
    - Low: North Atlantic Ocean, Arctic Ocean, and North Pacific Ocean 0 m
  - Land boundaries:
    - United States 8,893 km (5,526 miles)
    - Greenland 1,280 m (4,200 feet) (on Hans Island)
  - Coastline: 202,080 km (125,570 miles)
- Population of Canada: 36,991,981 people (2021 Census) – 36th most populous country
- Area of Canada: 9,984,670 km^{2} (3,855,100 square miles) – 2nd most extensive country
- Atlas of Canada

=== Environment ===
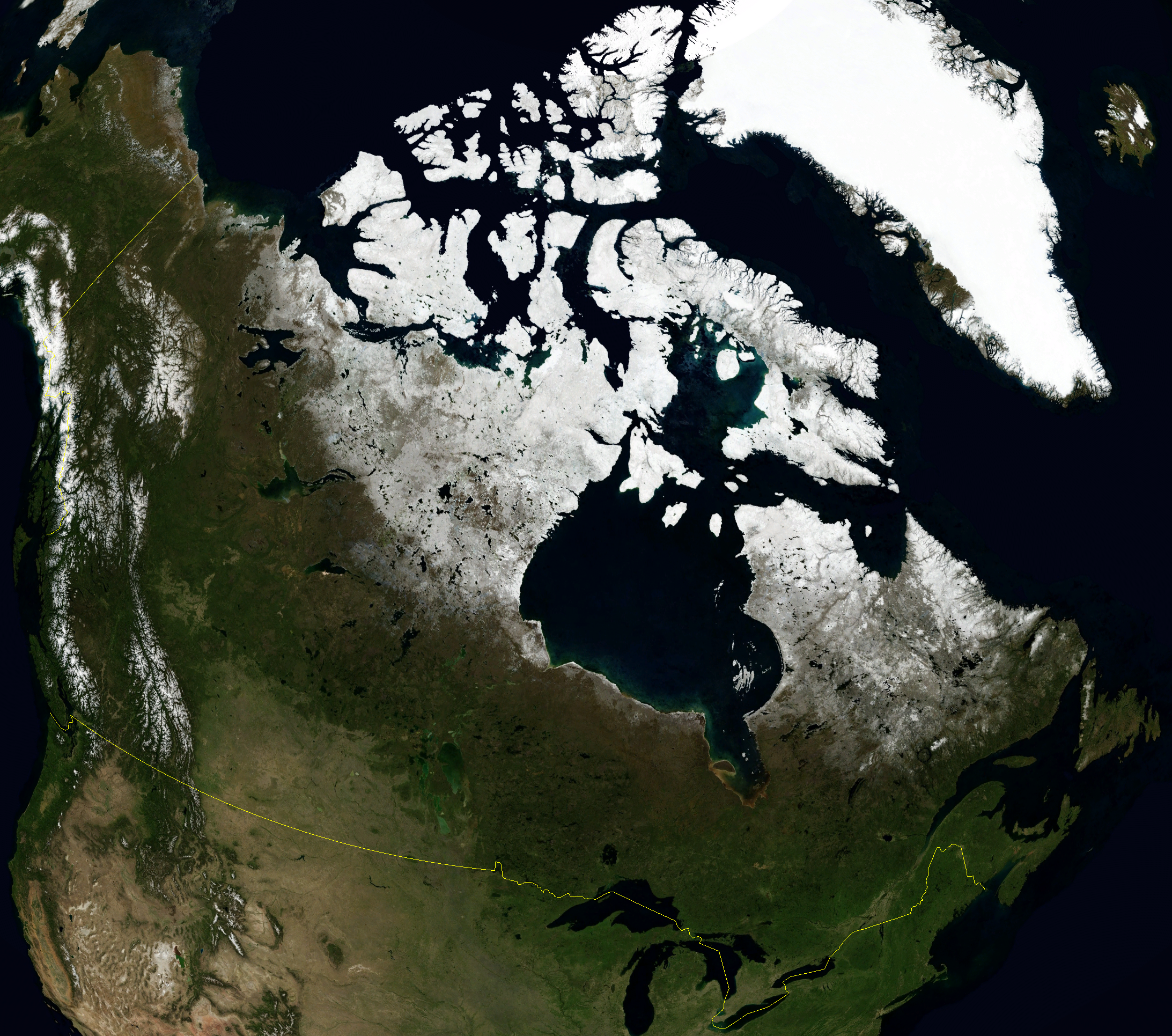
An enlargeable satellite image of Canada

Environment of Canada

- Climate of Canada
- Environmental issues in Canada
  - Fires in Canada
- Ecoregions in Canada
- Renewable energy in Canada
- Geology of Canada
  - Earthquakes in Canada
- National parks of Canada
- Protected areas of Canada
- Wildlife of Canada
  - Flora of Canada
  - Fauna of Canada
    - Birds of Canada
    - Mammals of Canada

==== Geographic features ====
- Canadian Arctic
- Fjords of Canada
- Glaciers of Canada
- Islands of Canada
- Lakes of Canada
  - Great Lakes

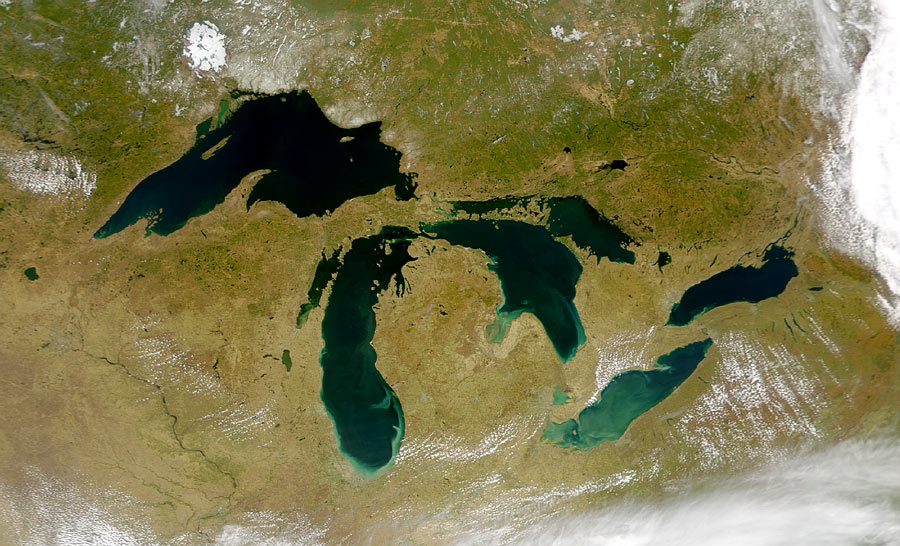
A satellite image of the Great Lakes.

- Mountain peaks of Canada
  - The 100 Highest mountain peaks of Canada
  - The 142 Most prominent mountain peaks of Canada
  - The 100 Most isolated mountain peaks of Canada
  - Appalachian Mountains
  - Pacific Cordillera
  - Rocky Mountains
  - Volcanoes of Canada
- Prairies of Canada
- Rivers of Canada
  - Waterfalls of Canada
- Valleys of Canada
- World Heritage Sites in Canada
- Other
  - Canadian Shield
  - St. Lawrence Lowlands
  - List of National Historic Sites of Canada

=== Regions ===
- Northern Canada (The North)
- Western Canada
  - Prairies
- Eastern Canada
  - Central Canada
  - Atlantic Canada
    - Maritimes

==== Other regions ====
- English Canada, sometimes known as the Rest of Canada (excluding Quebec) when considering topics of language
- French Canada
- Acadia
- Quebec-Windsor Corridor

=== Provinces and territories ===
Provinces and territories of Canada

- Alberta
- British Columbia
- Manitoba
- New Brunswick
- Newfoundland and Labrador
- Nova Scotia
- Ontario
- Prince Edward Island
- Quebec
- Saskatchewan
- Northwest Territories
- Nunavut
- Yukon

==== Municipalities ====
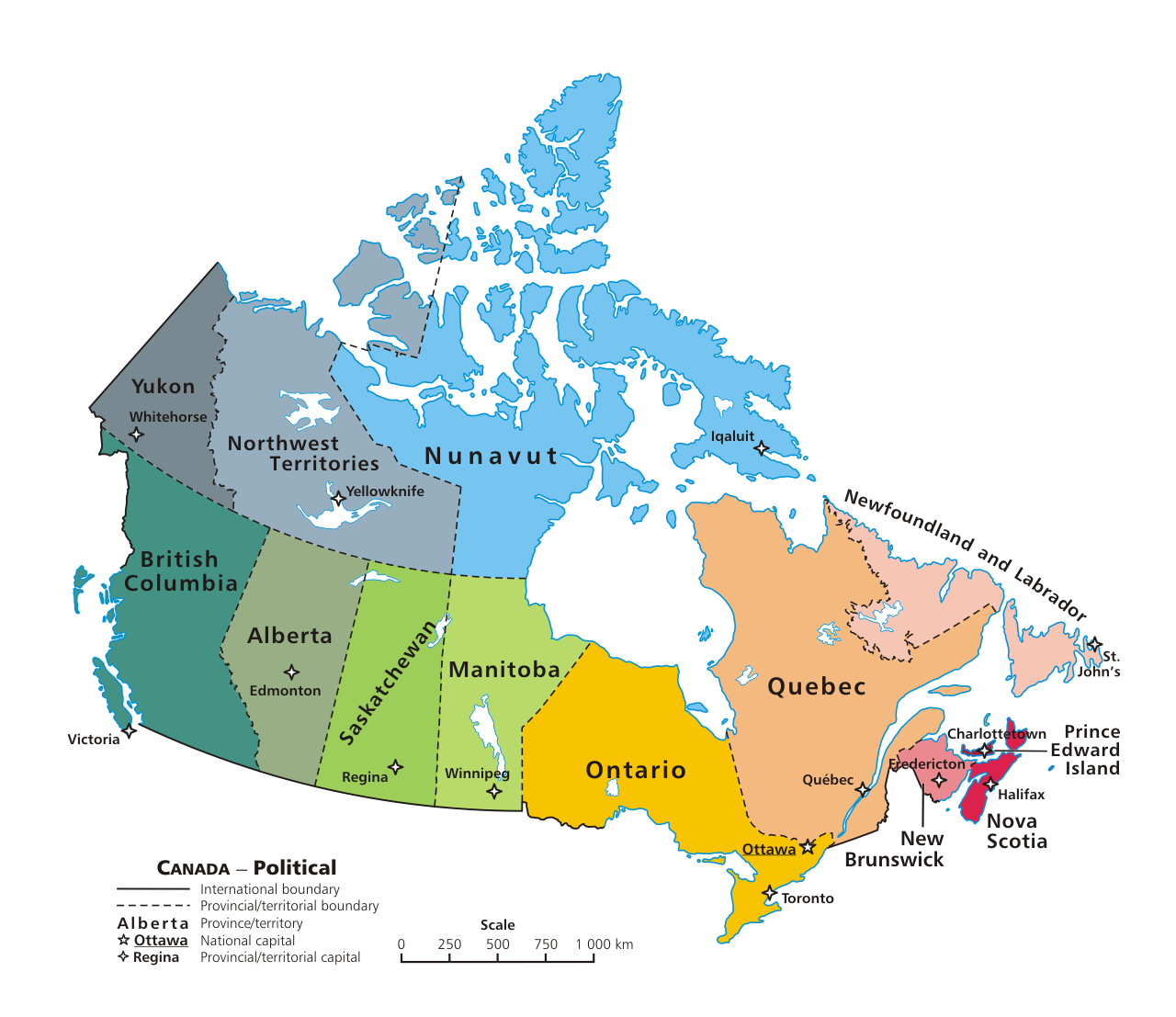

Municipalities of Canada

- Cities of Canada
  - Capital of Canada: Ottawa

=== Demography ===
Demography of Canada

- Canadians
- Immigration to Canada
- Aboriginal peoples in Canada

=== Demographics by political division ===
==== Provinces ====
- Demographics of Alberta
- Demographics of British Columbia
  - Demographics of Vancouver (city)
- Demographics of Manitoba
- Demographics of New Brunswick
- Demographics of Newfoundland and Labrador
- Demographics of Nova Scotia
- Demographics of Ontario
  - Demographics of Toronto (city)
- Demographics of Prince Edward Island
- Demographics of Quebec
  - Demographic history of Quebec
  - Demographics of Montreal (city)
- Demographics of Saskatchewan

==== Territories ====
- Demographics of Northwest Territories
- Demographics of Nunavut
- Demographics of the Yukon

== Government and politics ==
Politics of Canada

- Form of government: constitutional monarchy and democratic parliamentary federation
- Capital of Canada: Ottawa
- Provinces and territories of Canada
- Canadian and American politics compared
- Canadian and Australian politics compared
- Canadian Conservatism
- List of Canadian federal general elections
- Canadian Nationalism
- Elections in Canada
  - Electoral ridings
  - Electoral system
  - List of elections
- Federalism in Canada
- Human rights in Canada
- Liberalism in Canada
- Political culture of Canada
- Political parties in Canada
- Political scandals of Canada
- Progressivism in Canada
- Socialism and Social Democracy in Canada
- Taxation in Canada

=== Branches of the government ===
Politics of Canada

==== Executive branch of the government ====
- Head of state: Charles III, King of Canada
  - Governor General of Canada, the King's representative: Louise Arbour
    - King's Privy Council for Canada
      - Prime Minister (Mark Carney)
      - Cabinet (Twenty-Eighth Ministry)
      - Ministries
      - President of the King's Privy Council
      - Privy Council Office
      - Clerk of the Privy Council

Government of Canada

- Head of government: Mark Carney, Prime Minister of Canada
  - Cabinet of Canada (Majority government)

==== Legislative branch of the government ====
- Parliament of Canada
  - The King
  - Senate of Canada
    - Speaker of the Senate of Canada
  - House of Commons of Canada
    - Speaker of the House of Commons of Canada

==== Judicial branch of the government ====
Court system of Canada

- Supreme Court of Canada
- Appellate Courts of the provinces and territories
  - Alberta Court of Appeal
  - British Columbia Court of Appeal
  - Manitoba Court of Appeal
  - New Brunswick Court of Appeal
  - Court of Appeal of Newfoundland and Labrador
  - Court of Appeal for the Northwest Territories
  - Nova Scotia Court of Appeal
  - Nunavut Court of Appeal
  - Court of Appeal for Ontario
  - Court of Appeal of Prince Edward Island
  - Quebec Court of Appeal
  - Saskatchewan Court of Appeal
  - Court of Appeal of the Yukon Territory
- Superior-level trial courts of the provinces and territories
  - Court of King's Bench of Alberta
  - Supreme Court of British Columbia
  - Court of King's Bench of Manitoba
  - Court of King's Bench of New Brunswick
  - Supreme Court of Newfoundland and Labrador
  - Supreme Court of the Northwest Territories
  - Supreme Court of Nova Scotia
  - Nunavut Court of Justice
  - Ontario Superior Court of Justice
  - Supreme Court of Prince Edward Island
  - Quebec Superior Court
  - Court of King's Bench for Saskatchewan
  - Supreme Court of the Yukon Territory

=== Foreign relations ===
Foreign relations of Canada

- Canadian peacekeeping

- Canadian Confederation
- Australia–Canada relations
- Canada–Caribbean relations
  - Barbados–Canada relations
  - Canada–Cuba relations
  - Canada–Grenada relations
  - Canada–Haiti relations
  - Canada–Jamaica relations
- Canada–Croatia relations
- Canada–Cyprus relations
- Canada–Czech Republic relations
- Canada–Denmark relations
- Canada–Egypt relations
- Canada–Estonia relations
- Canada–Ethiopia relations
- Canada–Finland relations
- Canada–France relations
- Canada–Georgia relations
- Canada–Germany relations
- Canada–Greece relations
- Canada–Holy See relations
- Canada–Hungary relations
- Canada–Iceland relations
- Canada–India relations
- Canada–Indonesia relations
- Canada–Ireland relations
- Canada–Israel relations
- Canada–Italy relations
- Canada–Japan relations
- Canada–Kazakhstan relations
- Canada–Kenya relations
- Canada–Kosovo relations
- Canada-Latin America relations
  - Brazilian–Canadian relations
  - Canada–Chile relations
  - Canada–Colombia relations
  - Canada–Panama relations
  - Canada–Paraguay relations
  - Canada–Peru relations
  - Canada–Uruguay relations
  - Canada–Venezuela relations
- Canada–Mexico relations
- Canada–Latvia relations
- Canada–Lebanon relations
- Canada–Lithuania relations
- Canada–Luxembourg relations
- Canada–Malaysia relations
- Canada–Malta relations
- Canada–Mongolia relations
- Canada–Montenegro relations
- Canada–Morocco relations
- Canada–Netherlands relations
- Canada–New Zealand relations
- Canada–Nigeria relations
- Canada–Norway relations
- Canada–Pakistan relations
- Canada–People's Republic of China relations
- Canada–Philippines relations
- Canada–Poland relations
- Canada–Romania relations
- Canada–Russia relations
- Canada–Saudi Arabia relations
- Canada–Serbia relations
- Canada–Singapore relations
- Canada–Slovakia relations
- Canada–Slovenia relations
- Canada–South Korea relations
- Canada–Soviet Union relations
- Canada–Spain relations
- Canada–Sweden relations
- Canada–Switzerland relations
- Canada–Thailand relations
- Canada–Tunisia relations
- Canada–Turkey relations
- Canada–Ukraine relations
- Canada–United Kingdom relations
- Canada – United States relations
- Canada–Vietnam relations
- Canada–Zimbabwe relations

==== International organization membership ====
Canada is a member of:

- African Development Bank Group (AfDB) (nonregional member)
- African Union/United Nations Hybrid operation in Darfur (UNAMID)
- Arctic Council
- Asian Development Bank (ADB) (nonregional member)
- Asia-Pacific Economic Cooperation (APEC)
- Association of Caribbean States (ACS) (observer and partner)
- Association of Southeast Asian Nations (ASEAN) (dialogue partner)
- Association of Southeast Asian Nations Regional Forum (ARF)
- Australia Group
- Bank for International Settlements (BIS)
- Caribbean Development Bank (CDB)
- Caribbean Postal Union (CPU)
- Commonwealth of Nations
- Council of Europe (CE) (observer)
- Euro-Atlantic Partnership Council (EAPC)
- European Bank for Reconstruction and Development (EBRD)
- European Space Agency (ESA) (cooperating state)
- Food and Agriculture Organization (FAO)
- Group of Seven (G7)
- Group of Eight (G8)
- Group of Ten (G10)
- Group of Twenty Finance Ministers and Central Bank Governors (G20)
- Inter-American Development Bank (IADB)
- International Atomic Energy Agency (IAEA)
- International Bank for Reconstruction and Development (IBRD)
- International Chamber of Commerce (ICC)
- International Civil Aviation Organization (ICAO)
- International Criminal Court (ICCt)
- International Criminal Police Organization (Interpol)
- International Development Association (IDA)
- International Energy Agency (IEA)
- International Federation of Red Cross and Red Crescent Societies (IFRCS)
- International Finance Corporation (IFC)
- International Fund for Agricultural Development (IFAD)
- International Hydrographic Organization (IHO)
- International Labour Organization (ILO)
- International Maritime Organization (IMO)
- International Mobile Satellite Organization (IMSO)
- International Monetary Fund (IMF)
- International Olympic Committee (IOC)
- International Organization for Migration (IOM)
- International Organization for Standardization (ISO)
- International Red Cross and Red Crescent Movement (ICRM)
- International Telecommunication Union (ITU)
- International Telecommunications Satellite Organization (ITSO)
- International Trade Union Confederation (ITUC)
- Inter-Parliamentary Union (IPU)
- Multilateral Investment Guarantee Agency (MIGA)
- Nonaligned Movement (NAM) (guest)
- North American Free Trade Agreement (NAFTA)
- North Atlantic Treaty Organization (NATO)
- Nuclear Energy Agency (NEA)
- Nuclear Suppliers Group (NSG)
- Organisation internationale de la Francophonie (OIF)
- Organisation for Economic Co-operation and Development (OECD)
- Organization for Security and Cooperation in Europe (OSCE)
- Organisation for the Prohibition of Chemical Weapons (OPCW)
- Organization of American States (OAS)
- Pacific Islands Forum (PIF) (observer)
- Paris Club
- ParlAmericas
- Permanent Court of Arbitration (PCA) (partner)
- Postal Union of the Americas, Spain and Portugal
- Southeast European Cooperative Initiative (SECI)
- United Nations (UN)
- United Nations Conference on Trade and Development (UNCTAD)
- United Nations Disengagement Observer Force (UNDOF)
- United Nations Educational, Scientific, and Cultural Organization (UNESCO)
- United Nations High Commissioner for Refugees (UNHCR)
- United Nations Mission in the Sudan (UNMIS)
- United Nations Organization Mission in the Democratic Republic of the Congo (MONUC)
- United Nations Peacekeeping Force in Cyprus (UNFICYP)
- United Nations Relief and Works Agency for Palestine Refugees in the Near East (UNRWA)
- United Nations Stabilization Mission in Haiti (MINUSTAH)
- United Nations Truce Supervision Organization (UNTSO)
- Universal Postal Union (UPU)
- World Confederation of Labour (WCL)
- World Customs Organization (WCO)
- World Federation of Trade Unions (WFTU)
- World Health Organization (WHO)
- World Intellectual Property Organization (WIPO)
- World Meteorological Organization (WMO)
- World Tourism Organization (UNWTO)
- World Trade Organization (WTO)
- Zangger Committee (ZC)

=== Legal system ===
Law of Canada

- Canadian Aboriginal law
- Canada Bank Act
- Canadian Bill of Rights
- Canadian competition law
- Constitution of Canada
- Canadian content
- Canadian contract law
- Canadian copyright law
- Canadian corporation
- Crime in Canada
- Canadian family law
- Criminal law of Canada
  - Criminal Code
- Law enforcement in Canada
  - List of law enforcement agencies in Canada

=== Military ===
Military of Canada

- Command structure
  - Commander-in-chief: Governor General of Canada (nominally, see also The Canadian Crown and the Canadian Forces)
  - Prime Minister of Canada (de facto Commander-in-chief)
    - Minister of National Defence
      - Chief of the Defence Staff
        - Royal Canadian Navy (RCN), command of the Navy;
        - Canadian Army (CA) command of the Army;
        - Royal Canadian Air Force (RCAF), command of the Air Force.
        - Canadian Joint Operations Command (CJOC), responsible for all operations except special forces;
        - Canadian Special Operations Forces Command (CANSOFCOM), responsible for special forces operations within Canada and abroad.
- Canadian Forces
  - Army: Canadian Army
  - Navy: Royal Canadian Navy
  - Air force: Royal Canadian Air Force
  - Special forces: Canadian Special Operations Forces Command
  - Military reserve force: Canadian Forces reserve force
    - Canadian Forces Primary Reserve
    - Canadian Forces Supplementary Reserve
    - Canadian Rangers
    - Cadet Instructors Cadre
- Canadian Coast Guard

=== Provincial governments ===
- Government of Alberta
- Government of British Columbia
  - Government of Vancouver (city)
- Government of Manitoba
  - Legislative Assembly of Manitoba
  - Monarchy in Manitoba
- Government of New Brunswick
- Government of Newfoundland and Labrador
- Government of Nova Scotia
- Government of Ontario
  - City of Toronto government (city)
- Government of Prince Edward Island
- Government of Quebec
  - Government of Montreal (city)
- Government of Saskatchewan

=== Territory governments ===
- Government of the Northwest Territories
- Government of Nunavut
- Government of the Yukon

=== Politics by political division ===
==== Provinces ====
- Politics of Alberta
  - Politics of Calgary (city)
- Politics of British Columbia
  - Politics of Vancouver (city)
- Politics of Manitoba
- Politics of New Brunswick
- Politics of Newfoundland and Labrador
- Politics of Nova Scotia
- Politics of Ontario
  - Politics of Ottawa
  - Politics of Toronto (city)
- Politics of Prince Edward Island
- Politics of Quebec
- Politics of Saskatchewan

==== Territories ====
- Politics of Northwest Territories
- Politics of Nunavut
- Politics of the Yukon

== History ==
- Former Colonies and Territories in Canada
- Constitutional history of Canada
- History of immigration to Canada
- Economic history of Canada
- Fires in Canada
- Military history of Canada
- History of monarchy in Canada
- Persons of National Historic Significance
- Territorial evolution of Canada (1867–present)

=== History of Canada by period ===
- Pre-Columbian era (Canada)
- 1534–1763: New France
- 1764-1867: Canada under British Imperial Control
- 1867–1914: Post-Confederation Canada
- 1914–1945: Canada in the World Wars and Interwar Years
- 1945–1960
- 1960–1981
- 1982–1992
- 1992–present

=== History of Canada by political division ===
==== Provinces ====
- History of Alberta
- History of British Columbia
  - History of Vancouver (city)
- History of Manitoba
- History of New Brunswick
- History of Newfoundland and Labrador
- History of Nova Scotia
- History of Ontario
  - History of Toronto (city)
- History of Prince Edward Island
- History of Quebec
  - Demographic history of Quebec
  - History of Montreal (city)
- History of Saskatchewan

==== Territories ====
- History of Nunavut
- History of the Northwest Territories
- History of the Yukon

== Culture ==
Culture of Canada

- Age and internet use in Canada
- Alcoholic beverages in Canada
- Architecture of Canada
  - Gothic Revival architecture in Canada
  - Oldest buildings in Canada
- Cuisine of Canada
  - Supermarket Chains in Canada
- Decorations and medals of Canada (in order of precedence)
- Festivals in Canada
- Humour in Canada
- Languages of Canada
  - Canadian Aboriginal syllabics
  - Official bilingualism in Canada
  - Canadian English
  - Canadian French
- Media in Canada
- Symbols of Canada
  - National symbols of Canada
    - Coat of arms of Canada
    - Flag of Canada
    - National anthem of Canada
  - Royal symbols of Canada
- Canadians
  - Canadian identity
    - Canadian nationalism
    - Canadian cultural protectionism
  - Ethnic groups in Canada
    - History of immigration to Canada
- Prostitution in Canada
- Public holidays in Canada
- World Heritage Sites in Canada

=== Culture by political division ===
==== Provinces ====
- Culture of Alberta
- Culture of British Columbia
  - Culture of Vancouver (city)
- Culture of Manitoba
- Culture of New Brunswick
- Culture of Nova Scotia
- Culture of Ontario
  - Culture of Hamilton, Ontario (city)
  - Culture of Toronto (city)
- Culture of Prince Edward Island
- Culture of Quebec
  - Culture of Montreal (city)
- Culture of Saskatchewan

==== Territories ====
- Culture of Northwest Territories
- Culture of Nunavut
- Culture of the Yukon

=== Art in Canada ===
- Art in Canada
  - Canadian Artists
  - Museums in Alberta
  - Museums in British Columbia
  - Museums in Manitoba
  - Museums in New Brunswick
  - Museums in Newfoundland and Labrador
  - Museums in Ontario
  - Museums in Quebec
  - Museums in Saskatchewan
- Cinema of Canada
  - Canadian Film Awards
- Canadian comics
  - Central Canada Comic Con
- Literature of Canada
  - Canadian writers
- Television in Canada
- Theatre of Canada
  - Canadian playwrights

==== Music ====
Music of Canada

- Canadian blues
- Canadian classical music
- Canadian hip hop
- Canadian Idol
- Canadian rock
- Caribbean music in Canada
- Music of Canadian cultures

===== Music by political division =====
====== Provinces ======
- Music of Alberta
- Music of British Columbia
  - Music of Vancouver (city)
- Music of Manitoba
- Music of New Brunswick
- Music of Newfoundland and Labrador
- Music of Nova Scotia
- Music of Ontario
  - Music of Toronto (city)
- Music of Prince Edward Island
- Music of Quebec
  - Music of Montreal (city)
- Music of Saskatchewan

====== Territories ======
- Music of Northwest Territories
- Music of Nunavut
- Music of the Yukon

=== Religion in Canada ===
- Religion in Canada
  - Buddhism in Canada
  - Christianity in Canada
    - Roman Catholicism in Canada
  - Hinduism in Canada
  - Islam in Canada
  - Judaism in Canada
  - Sikhism in Canada
- Irreligion in Canada

=== Sport in Canada ===
Sport in Canada Official Sports

- Ice hockey
- Lacrosse

Other sports

- Canadian football
- Canada at the Olympics
- Canada Rugby League
- Canadian Curling Association
- Canadian Figure Skating
- Association Football (Soccer) in Canada
- Cross Country Skiing
- Snowboarding in Canada
- Pickleball in Canada

Hall of Fame Museums

- Hockey Hall of Fame
- Canadian Curling Hall of Fame
- Skate Canada Hall of Fame
- Canadian Lacrosse Hall of Fame

== Economy and infrastructure ==
Economy of Canada

- Economic rank, by nominal GDP (2007): 9th (ninth)
- Agriculture in Canada
- Banking in Canada
  - Banks in Canada
    - National Bank of Canada
- Communications in Canada
  - Internet in Canada
- Companies of Canada
- List of convention and exhibition centres
- Currency of Canada: Dollar
  - ISO 4217: CAD
- Economic history of Canada
- Energy in Canada
  - Geothermal power in Canada
- Health care in Canada
  - Emergency medical services in Canada
- Mining in Canada
- Science and technology in Canada
- Stock exchanges:
  - CNQ
  - Nasdaq Canada
  - Toronto Stock Exchange, S&P/TSX 60 is the main index of TSX
  - TSX Venture Exchange
  - Winnipeg Commodity Exchange
  - Montreal Exchange
- Tourism in Canada
  - Niagara Falls
- Transport in Canada
  - Airports in Canada
  - Rail transport in Canada
  - Roads in Canada
- Water supply and sanitation in Canada

=== Economics by political division ===
==== Provinces ====
- Economy of Alberta
- Economy of British Columbia
  - Economy of Vancouver (city)
- Economy of Manitoba
- Economy of New Brunswick
- Economy of Newfoundland and Labrador
- Economy of Nova Scotia
- Economy of Ontario
  - Economy of Toronto (city)
- Economy of Prince Edward Island
- Economy of Quebec
  - Demographic history of Quebec
  - Economy of Montreal (city)
- Economy of Saskatchewan

==== Territories ====
- Economy of Northwest Territories
- Economy of Nunavut
- Economy of the Yukon

== Education in Canada ==
=== Education by political division ===
==== Provinces ====
- Education in Alberta
- Education in British Columbia
- Education in Manitoba
- Education in New Brunswick
- Education in Newfoundland and Labrador
- Education in Nova Scotia
- Education in Ontario
- Education in Prince Edward Island
- Education in Quebec
- Education in Saskatchewan

==== Territories ====
- Education in Northwest Territories
- Education in Nunavut
- Education in the Yukon

=== Higher Education by political division ===
==== Provinces ====
- Higher education in Alberta
- Higher education in British Columbia
- Higher education in Manitoba
- Higher education in New Brunswick
- Higher education in Newfoundland and Labrador
- Higher education in Nova Scotia
- Higher education in Ontario
- Higher education in Prince Edward Island
- Higher education in Quebec
- Higher education in Saskatchewan

==== Territories ====
- Higher education in Northwest Territories
- Higher education in Nunavut
- Higher education in the Yukon

== Bibliographies ==
- Bibliography of Canada
  - Bibliography of Canadian history
    - Bibliography of Canadian military history
      - Bibliography of the 1837-1838 insurrections in Lower Canada
      - List of books about the War of 1812
- Bibliography of Canadian provinces and territories
  - Bibliography of Alberta history
  - Bibliography of British Columbia
  - Bibliography of New Brunswick
  - Bibliography of Nova Scotia
  - Bibliography of Ontario
  - Bibliography of Saskatchewan history
- List of books about prime ministers of Canada

== Category ==
To display all subcategories below click on the ►

== See also ==
- Member state of the Commonwealth of Nations
- Member state of the Group of Twenty Finance Ministers and Central Bank Governors
- Member state of the North Atlantic Treaty Organization
- Member state of the United Nations
