= Demographic history of Quebec =

This is a demographic history of Quebec chronicling the evolution of the non-indigenous population in Quebec.

== Historical Census population ==
Year	Population	Change	Percent change
1605	44	N/A	N/A
1608	28	-16▼	-72.7▼
1610	18	-10▼	-77.7▼
1620	60	42▲	233.3▲
1630	100	40▲	66.7▲
1640	359	259▲	259▲
1653	2,000	1,641▲	557.1▲
1666	3,215	1,215▲	60.8▲
1667	3,918	703▲	21.9▲
1673	6,705	2,787▲	71.1▲
1675	7,832	1,127▲	16.8▲
1679	9,400	1,568▲	20▲
1683	12,566	3,166▲	33.7▲
1686	11,786	-780▼	-6.6▼
1692	12,431	645▲	5.5▲
1706	16,745	4,314▲	34.7▲
1713	18,469	1,724▲	10.3▲
1720	24,594	6,125▲	33.2▲
1727	31,184	6,590▲	26.8▲
1734	37,716	6,532▲	20.9▲
1739	43,362	5,646▲	15▲
1754	55,009	11,647▲	26.9▲
1765	69,810	14,801▲	26.9▲
1784	113,012	43,202▲	61.9▲
1790	161,311	48,299▲	42.7▲
1806	250,000	88,689▲	55▲
1814	335,000	85,000▲	34▲
1822	427,465	92,465▲	27.6▲
1831	553,134	125,669▲	29.4▲
1844	697,084	143,950▲	26▲
1851	890,000	192,916▲	27.7▲
1861	1,112,000	222,000▲	24.9▲
1871	1,192,000	80,000▲	7.2▲
1881	1,360,000	168,000▲	14.1▲
1891	1,489,000	129,000▲	9.5▲
1901	1,649,000	160,000▲	10.7▲
1906	1,815,000	166,000▲	10.1▲
1911	2,006,000	191,000▲	10.5▲
1916	2,182,000	176,000▲	8.8▲
1921	2,361,000	179,000▲	8.2▲
1926	2,573,000	212,000▲	9▲
1931	2,875,000	302,000▲	11.7▲
1936	3,102,000	227,000▲	7.9▲
1941	3,332,000	230,000▲	7.4▲
1946	3,645,000	313,000▲	9.4▲
1951	4,056,000	411,000▲	11.3▲
1956	4,628,000	572,000▲	14.1▲
1961	5,259,000	631,000▲	13.6▲
1966	5,781,000	522,000▲	9.9▲
1971	6,028,000	247,000▲	4▲
1976	6,234,000	206,000▲	3.4▲
1981	6,438,000	204,000▲	3.3▲
1986	6,532,000	94,000▲	1.5▲
1991	6,896,000	364,000▲	5.6▲
1996	7,139,000	243,000▲	3.5▲
2001	7,237,000	98,000▲	1.4▲
2006	7,546,000	309,000▲	4.3▲
2011	7,903,000	357,000▲	4.7▲
2016	8,164,000	261,000▲	3.3▲
2021	8,502,000	338,000▲	4.1▲
2024	9,056,000	554,000▲	5.3▲

== See also ==
- Demographics of Quebec
- History of Quebec
- Timeline of Quebec history
- the revenge of the cradles is an expression referring to the high birth rate of French Canadians prior to the late 20th century.
