= Demographics of Ontario =

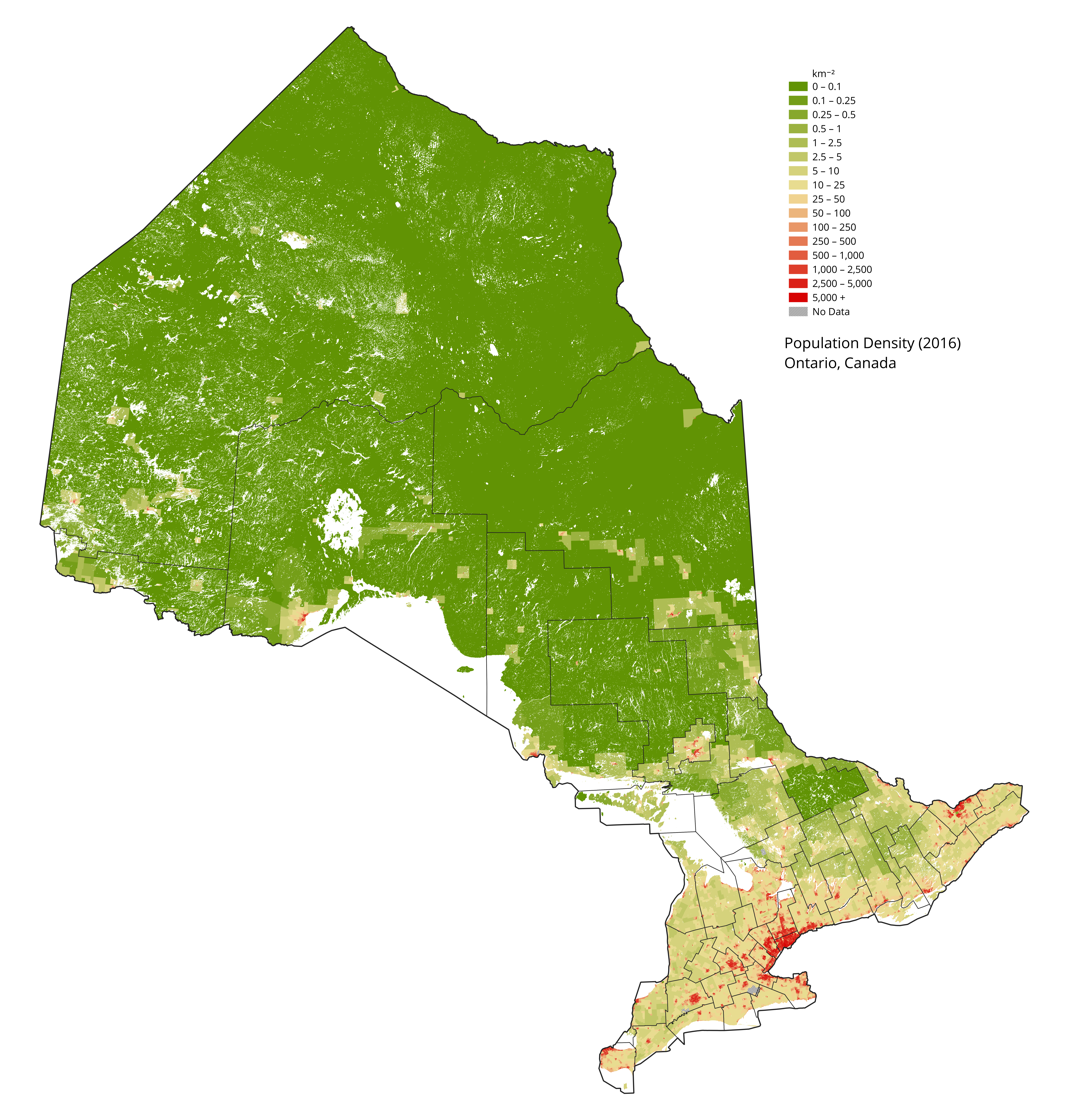
Population Density of Ontario in 2016

Ontario is the most populous of the 13 provinces and territories of Canada, accounting for nearly 40 percent of all Canadians. Located in east-central Canada, it is the second-largest province in total area, and the fourth-largest when the territories of the Northwest Territories and Nunavut are included. It is home to Canada's capital Ottawa, and its most populous city Toronto.

== Vital statistics ==
Birth rate: 9.7/1,000 people (2021)

Death rate: 8.1/1,000 people (2021)

Life expectancy at birth (2019):

- total: 82.6 years
- male: 80.4 years
- female: 84.7 years

Infant mortality rate: 5.2 (2007 est)

== Age structure ==
Age Groups	Total	Percentage	Male	Female
0 to 4 years	723,016	4.91%	370,982	352,034
5 to 9 years	762,654	5.18%	389,331	373,323
10 to 14 years	792,947	5.38%	403,611	389,336
15 to 19 years	852,405	5.79%	436,529	415,876
20 to 24 years	1,039,661	7.06%	543,213	496,448
25 to 29 years	1,077,433	7.31%	555,954	521,479
30 to 34 years	1,041,952	7.07%	527,137	514,815
35 to 39 years	992,844	6.74%	493,399	499,445
40 to 44 years	921,378	6.25%	446,692	474,686
45 to 49 years	932,058	6.33%	454,915	477,143
50 to 54 years	968,546	6.57%	478,610	489,936
55 to 59 years	1,073,519	7.29%	532,834	540,685
60 to 64 years	961,243	6.52%	469,926	491,317
65 to 69 years	803,962	5.46%	383,637	420,325
70 to 74 years	673,546	4.57%	316,777	356,769
75 to 79 years	461,015	3.13%	212,100	248,915
80 to 84 years	319,548	2.17%	140,109	179,439
85 to 89 years	204,227	1.39%	81,946	122,281
90 to 94 years	98,638	0.67%	33,530	65,108
95 to 99 years	29,527	0.20%	7,515	22,012
100 years and over	3,895	0.03%	701	3,194
Total	14,734,014	100%	7,279,448	7,454,566

=== Percentage surviving ===
The percentage surviving, is the percent of the population that would survive to certain age, if their life conditions in a given year, were extrapolated to their whole life. Data for 2019.

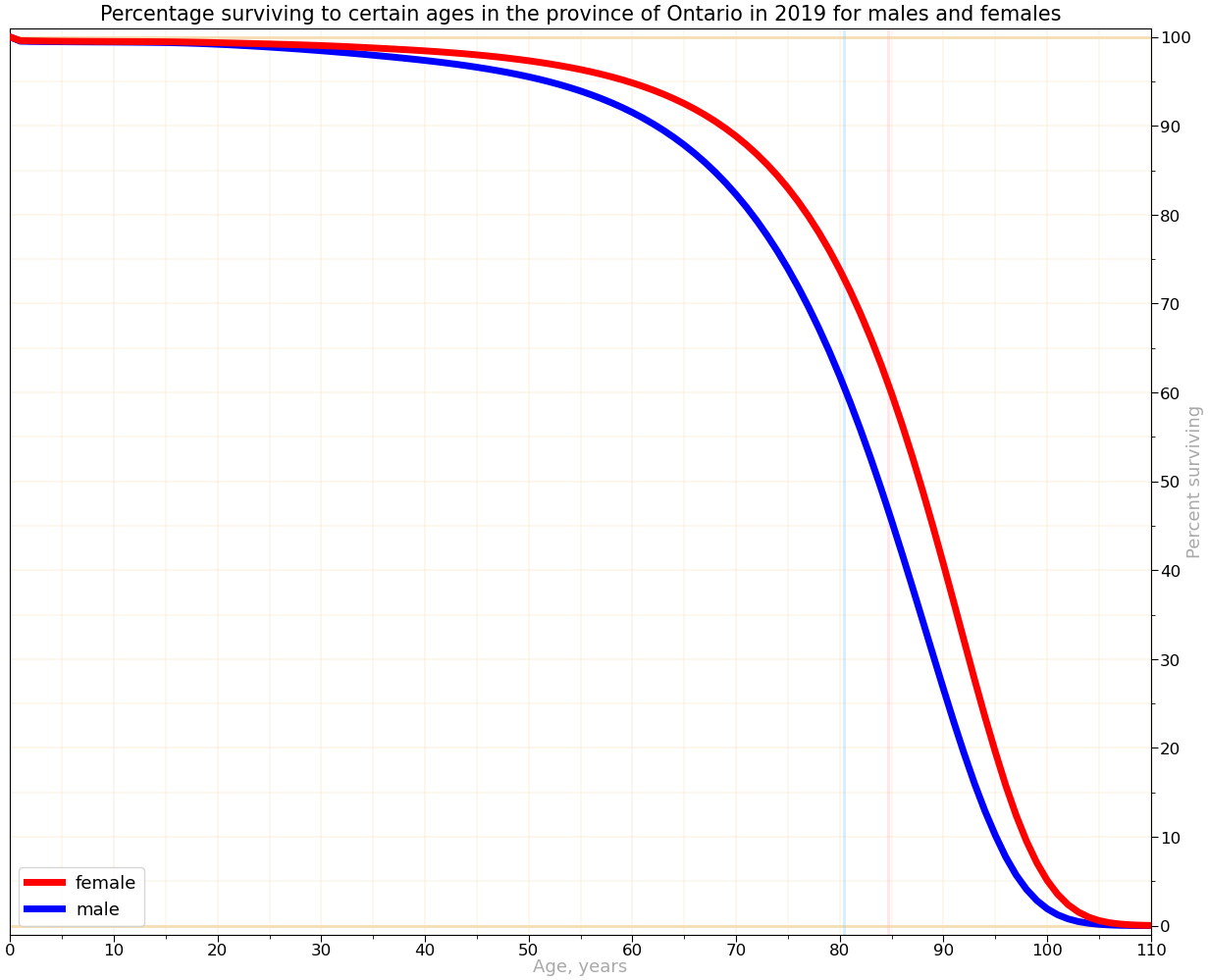
Percentage surviving to certain ages in Ontario in 2019. Life expectancy in the province in that year was 82.55 years.

Age	Percentage surviving		F / M
Age	male	female	F / M
1	99.5	99.6	1.00
5	99.5	99.5	1.00
10	99.4	99.5	1.00
15	99.4	99.5	1.00
20	99.2	99.4	1.00
25	98.9	99.2	1.00
30	98.5	99.0	1.01
35	98.0	98.8	1.01
40	97.4	98.4	1.01
45	96.6	98.0	1.01
50	95.5	97.3	1.02
55	93.9	96.3	1.03
60	91.5	94.8	1.04
65	87.8	92.5	1.05
70	82.3	88.8	1.08
75	73.9	83.0	1.12
80	61.8	73.8	1.19
85	45.6	59.9	1.31
90	26.6	40.7	1.53
95	10.2	19.5	1.92
100	1.900	5.090	2.68
105	0.149	0.573	3.85
110	0.005	0.025	5.00

Data source: Statistics Canada

== Population history ==
View chart definition.

Year	Population	5 year % change	10 year % change	% Canadian population
1824	150,066	-	-	n/a
1830	213,156	-	-	n/a
1840	432,159	-	102.7%	39.93%^{[a]}
1851	952,004	-	-	51.32%^{[a]}
1861	1,396,091	-	46.6%	55.58%^{[a]}
1871	1,620,851	-	16.1%	43.9%
1881	1,926,922	-	18.8%	45.4%
1891	2,114,321	-	9.7%	48.9%
1901	2,182,947	-	3.2%	40.6%
1911	2,527,292	-	15.8%	35.1%
1921	2,933,662	-	16.1%	33.4%
1931	3,431,683	-	17.0%	33.1%
1941	3,787,655	-	10.4%	32.9%
1951	4,597,542	-	21.3%	32.8%
1956	5,404,933	17.6%	-	33.6%
1961	6,236,092	15.4%	35.6%	34.2%
1966	6,960,870	11.6%	28.8%	34.9%
1971	7,703,105	10.7%	23.5%	35.7%
1976	8,264,465	7.3%	18.7%	35.9%
1981	8,625,107	4.4%	12.0%	35.4%
1986	9,101,695	5.5%	10.1%	36.0%
1991	10,084,885	10.8%	16.9%	36.9%
1996	10,753,573	10.7%	18.2%	37.3%
2001	11,410,046	6.1%	13.2%	38.0%
2006	12,160,282	6.6%	13.1%	38.4%
2011	12,851,821	5.7%	12.6%	38.4%
2016	13,448,494	4.6%	9.6%	38.3%
2021	14,223,942	5.8%	9.7%	38.5%

Source: Statistics Canada

- ^{a} % Province of Canada population

== Population geography ==
=== Census Metropolitan Areas ===
City	2021	2016	2011	2006	2001	1996	1991
Toronto	6,202,225	5,928,040	5,583,064	5,113,149	4,682,897	4,263,757	3,898,933
Ottawa-Gatineau	1,488,307	1,323,783	1,236,324	1,130,761	1,063,664	1,010,498	941,814
Hamilton	785,184	747,545	721,053	692,911	662,401	624,360	599,760
Kitchener-Cambridge-Waterloo	575,847	523,894	477,160	451,235	414,284	382,940	356,421
London	543,551	494,069	474,786	457,720	432,451	398,616	381,522
St. Catharines-Niagara	433,604	406,074	392,184	390,317	377,009	372,406	364,552
Windsor	422,630	329,144	319,246	323,342	307,877	278,685	262,075
Oshawa	415,311	379,848	356,177	330,594	296,298	268,773	240,104
Barrie	212,856	197,059	187,013	177,061	148,480	118,695	97,150
Kingston	172,546	161,175	159,561	152,358	146,838	143,416	136,401
Greater Sudbury	170,605	164,689	160,770	158,258	155,601	160,488	157,613
Guelph	165,588	151,984	141,097	127,009	117,344	105,420	97,667
Brantford	144,162	134,203	135,501	124,607	86,417	100,238	97,106
Peterborough	128,624	121,721	118,975	116,570	102,423	100,193	98,060
Thunder Bay	123,258	121,621	121,596	122,907	121,986	125,562	124,925
Belleville	111,184	103,472	101,668	91,518	87,395	87,871	-
Chatham-Kent	104,316	102,042	104,075	108,589	107,709	-	-

== Ethnic origins ==
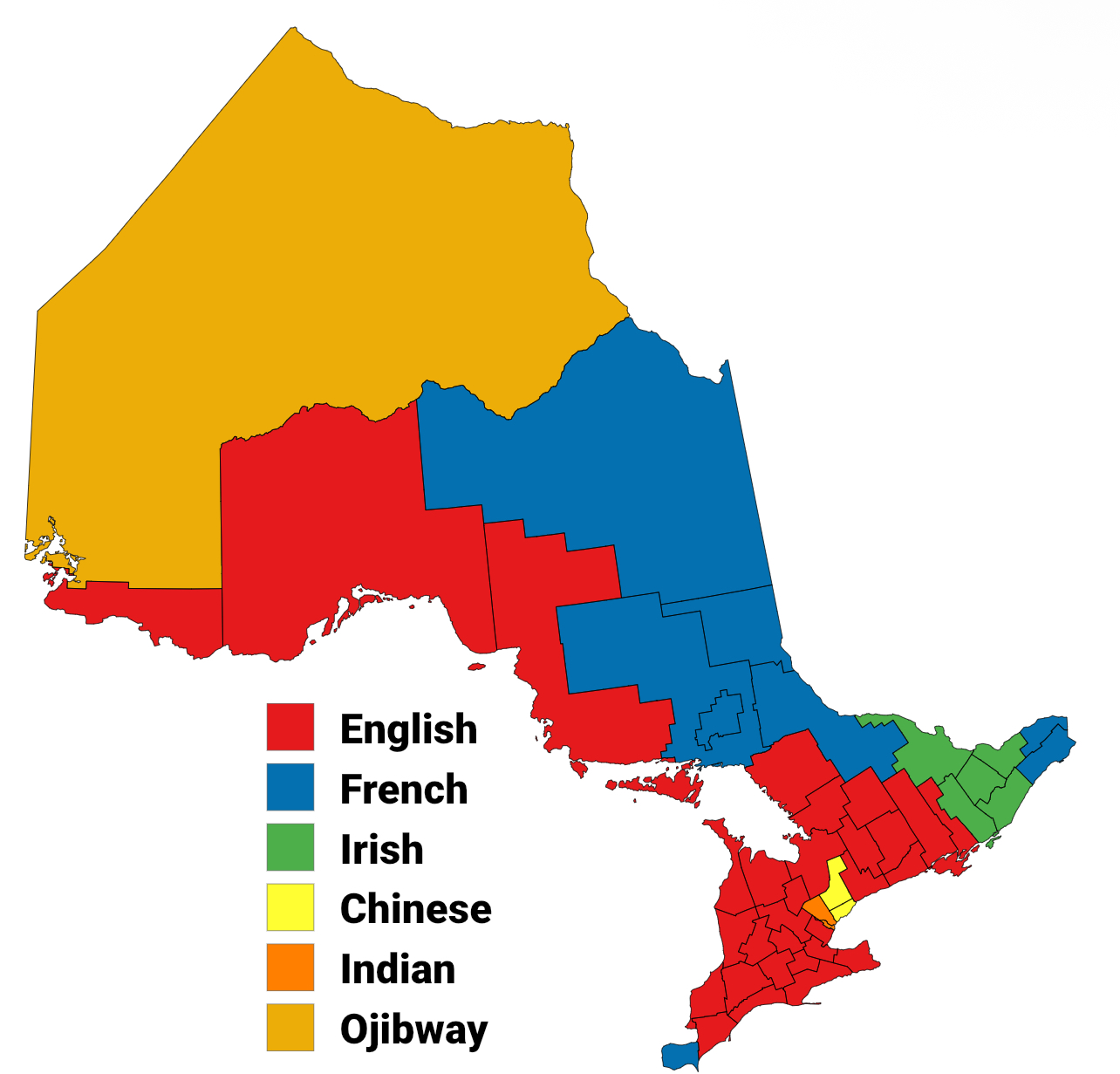
Largest ethnic origin by census division, 2021 census

As of 2016 census.

Ethnic group	Responses	%
Canadian	3,109,770	23.48
English	2,808,810	21.21
Scottish	2,107,290	15.91
Irish	2,095,465	15.82
French	1,349,255	10.19
German	1,189,670	8.98
Italian	931,805	7.04
Chinese	849,340	6.41
East Indian	774,495	5.85
Dutch (Netherlands)	527,750	3.99
Polish	523,490	3.95
First Nations	385,505	2.91
Ukrainian	376,440	2.84
Filipino	337,760	2.55
Portuguese	324,930	2.45
British, not included elsewhere	323,180	2.44
Jamaican	257,055	1.94
Russian	220,850	1.67
Welsh	198,470	1.50
Spanish	171,145	1.29
Hungarian (Magyar)	163,500	1.23
Pakistani	149,060	1.13
Greek	148,555	1.12
American (USA)	140,165	1.06
Métis	137,485	1.04

Note: The table takes dual responses (for example if someone is French-Canadian they would be added to both French and Canadian). Some places of one's ethnic origin do not refer to a single specified country of origin, i.e. Spanish refers to people from Spanish speaking countries such as Colombia, Spain, Mexico, Cuba and others; or East Indian where the respondents origin could be from Pakistan, India, Nepal, Bangladesh, etc.; and the list contains about 200 nationalities known to reside in the province. However, there are options for the respondent to identify the country alone.

As regards ethnic origins and Census Metropolitan Area (CMA) of highest concentration (minimum: 1%):

Ethnic origin	CMA	% of population
Chinese	Toronto	12.0
East Indian	Toronto	11.0
Filipino	Toronto	4.7
Jamaican	Toronto	3.4
Russian	Toronto	2.4
Pakistani	Toronto	2.1
Sri Lankan	Toronto	2.0
Spanish	Toronto	1.8
Greek	Toronto	1.7
Iranian	Toronto	1.7
Korean	Toronto	1.3
Other African origins, n.i.e	Toronto	1.1
Jewish	Toronto	1.0
Haitian	Ottawa-Gatineau	1.1
Croatian	Hamilton	1.9
German	Kitchener-Cambridge-Waterloo	21.8
Portuguese	Kitchener-Cambridge-Waterloo	4.1
Romanian	Kitchener-Cambridge-Waterloo	1.9
Swiss	Kitchener-Cambridge-Waterloo	1.5
Belgian	London	1.1
Lebanese	Windsor	3.3
Iraqi	Windsor	2.2
American	Windsor	1.7
Serbian	Windsor	1.4
Arab, n.o.s.	Windsor	1.0
British Isles origins, n.i.e.	Barrie	3.7
Canadian	Greater Sudbury	45.6
French	Greater Sudbury	37.7
Vietnamese	Guelph	1.6
Dutch	Brantford	8.0
Hungarian	Brantford	3.2
English	Peterborough	39.1
Irish	Peterborough	32.5
Scottish	Peterborough	26.3
Welsh	Peterborough	2.6
Italian	Thunder Bay	14.0
Ukrainian	Thunder Bay	13.5
Finnish	Thunder Bay	11.4
First Nations	Thunder Bay	10.5
Polish	Thunder Bay	7.1
Swedish	Thunder Bay	4.5
Métis	Thunder Bay	2.9
Norwegian	Thunder Bay	2.8
Slovak	Thunder Bay	2.0
Danish	Thunder Bay	1.1

=== Future projections ===
Panethnic origin projections in Ontario (2031–2041)
Panethnic group	2031		2036		2041	
Panethnic group	Pop.	%	Pop.	%	Pop.	%
European (Note: Statistic includes all persons that did not make up part of a visible minority or an indigenous identity.)	9,335,000	53.62%	9,215,000	50.02%	9,044,000	46.89%
South Asian	2,562,000	14.71%	2,992,000	16.24%	3,371,000	17.48%
East Asian (Note: Statistic includes total responses of "Chinese", "Korean", and "Japanese" under visible minority section on census.)	1,444,000	8.29%	1,583,000	8.59%	1,706,000	8.84%
African	1,133,000	6.51%	1,288,000	6.99%	1,433,000	7.43%
Middle Eastern (Note: Statistic includes total responses of "West Asian" and "Arab" under visible minority section on census.)	858,000	4.93%	1,018,000	5.53%	1,168,000	6.06%
Southeast Asian (Note: Statistic includes total responses of "Filipino" and "Southeast Asian" under visible minority section on census.)	784,000	4.5%	897,000	4.87%	1,006,000	5.22%
Indigenous	576,000	3.31%	623,000	3.38%	666,000	3.45%
Latin American	355,000	2.04%	398,000	2.16%	438,000	2.27%
Other/multiracial (Note: Statistic includes total responses of "Visible minority, n.i.e." and "Multiple visible minorities" under visible minority section on census.)	364,000	2.09%	410,000	2.23%	456,000	2.36%
Projected Ontario population	17,411,000	100%	18,424,000	100%	19,288,000	100%

== Visible minorities and Indigenous peoples ==
Indigenous identity in Ontario, 2021

Visible minority population in Ontario, 2021

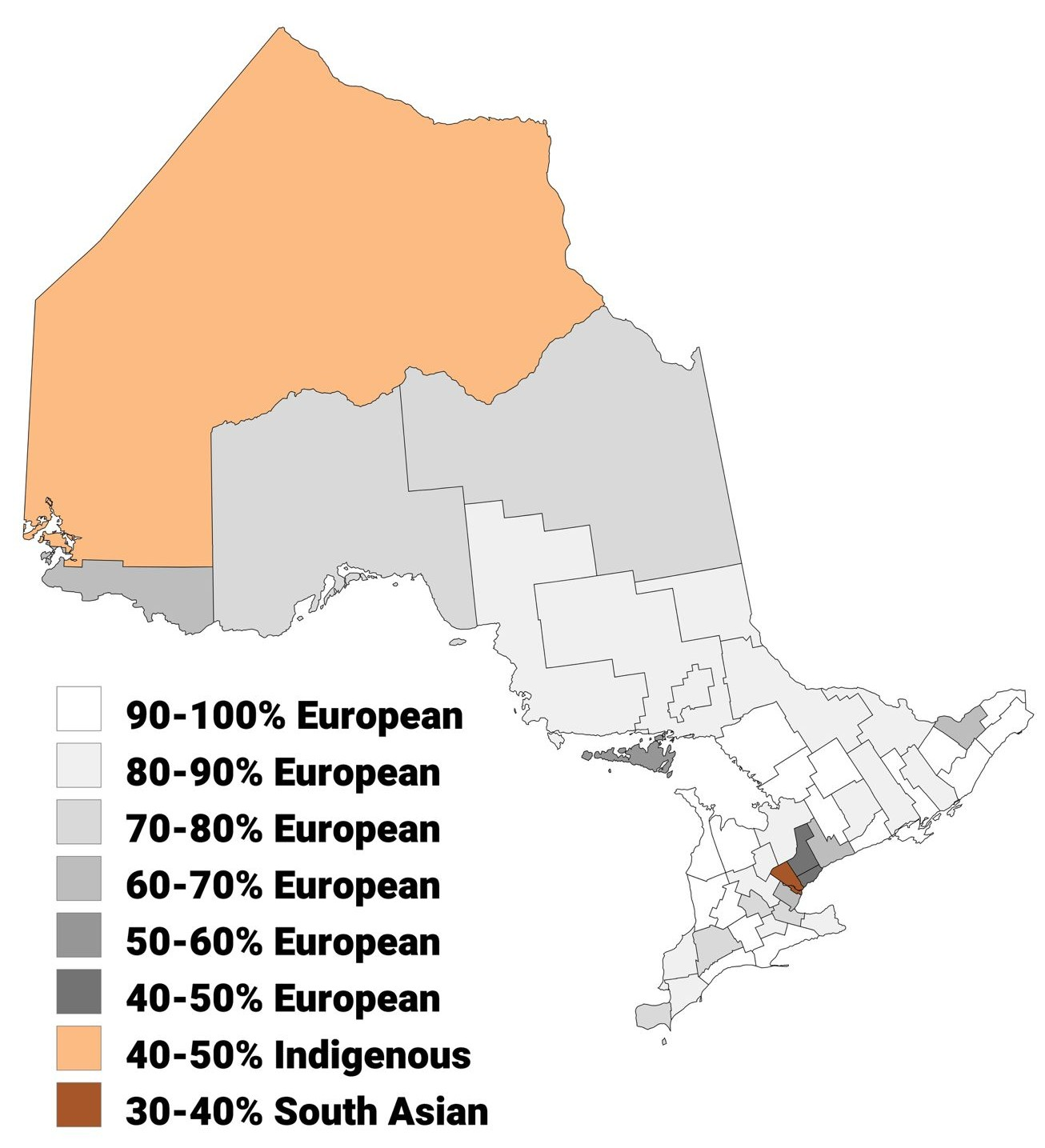
Largest panethnic groups in Ontario by percentage of total population by census division, 2021 census

There is a striking difference between the Toronto CMA (5,862,850) and the rest of Ontario (7,379,310); in particular, in the Toronto CMA visible minorities account for 51.4% of the population (3,011,900), whereas in the rest of Ontario the percentage of visible minorities in the overall population is much lower, at 11.8% (873,685). Back in 1996,1,338,095 of 4,232,905 Toronto CMA residents belonged to a visible minority, i.e. 31.6% of its population; regarding the rest of Ontario, only 343,950 of its 6,409,885 residents, i.e. 5.4%, were visible minorities.

Visible minority & Indigenous population in Ontario (1986–2021)
Group	Population	2021 census		2016 census		2011 census		2006 census		2001 census		1996 census		1991 census		1986 census	
Group	Population	Pop.	%	Pop.	%	Pop.	%	Pop.	%	Pop.	%	Pop.	%	Pop.	%	Pop.	%
Non-Indigenous / non-visible minority group	British Isles (Note: Including multiple responses.) (Note: 1996-present census populations for British Isles and French origins may be undercounts, due to the creation of the "Canadian" ethnic origin category. All citizens of Canada are classified as "Canadians" as defined by Canada's nationality laws. However, "Canadian" as an ethnic group has since 1996 been added to census questionnaires for possible ancestry. "Canadian" was included as an example on the English questionnaire and "Canadien" as an example on the French questionnaire. "The majority of respondents to this selection are from the eastern part of the country that was first settled. Respondents generally are visibly European (Anglophones and Francophones), however no-longer self identify with their ethnic ancestral origins. This response is attributed to a multitude or generational distance from ancestral lineage. Source 1: Jack Jedwab (April 2008). "Our 'Cense' of Self: the 2006 Census saw 1.6 million 'Canadian' Canadians Return to British and French origins" (PDF). Association for Canadian Studies. p. 2. Archived from the original (PDF) on October 2, 2011. "Virtually all persons who reported "Canadian" in 1996 had English or French as a mother tongue, were born in Canada and had both parents born inside Canada. This suggests that many of these respondents were people whose families have been in this country for several generations. In effect the "new Canadians" were persons that previously reported either British or French origins. Moreover in 1996 some 55% of people with both parents born in Canada reported Canadian (alone or in combination with other origins). By contrast, only 4% of people with both parents born outside Canada reported Canadian. Thus the Canadian response did not appeal widely to either immigrants or their children. Most important however was that nearly half of those persons reporting Canadian origin in 1996 were in Quebec this represented a majority of the mother tongue francophone population[...]In the 2001 Census, 11.7 million people, or 39% of the total population, reported Canadian as their ethnic origin, either alone or in combination with other origins. Some 4.9 million Quebecers out of 7.1 million individuals reported Canadian or "Canadien" thus accounting for nearly seven in ten persons (nearly eighty percent of francophones in Quebec)." Source 2: Don Kerr (2007). The Changing Face of Canada: Essential Readings in Population. Canadian Scholars' Press. pp. 313–317. ISBN 978-1-55130-322-2. Source 3: Jantzen (2006) Footnote 5: Note that Canadian and Canadien have been separated since the two terms mean different things. In English, it usually means someone whose family has been in Canada for multiple generations. In French it is referring to "Les Habitants", settlers of New France during the 17th and 18th centuries who earned their living primarily from agricultural labour. Source 4: Jantzen (2006): The reporting of French New World ancestries (Canadien, Québécois, and French-Canadian) is concentrated in the 4th+ generations; 79% of French-Canadian, 88% of Canadien and 90% of Québécois are in the 4th+generations category. Source 5: Jantzen (2005): According to Table 3, the 4th+ generations are highest because of a strong sense of belonging to their ethnic or cultural group among those respondents reporting the New World ancestries of Canadien and Québécois. Source 6: Jantzen (2006): For respondents of French and New World ancestries the pattern is different. Where generational data is available, it is possible to see that not all respondents reporting these ancestries report a high sense of belonging to their ethnic or cultural group. The high proportions are focused among those respondents that are in the 4th+ generations, and unlike with the British Isles example, the difference between the 2nd and 3rd generations to the 4th+ generation is more pronounced. Since these ancestries are concentrated in the 4th+ generations, their high proportions of sense of belonging to ethnic or cultural group push up the 4th+ generational results.)	4,693,740	33.45%	4,900,430	37.01%	4,989,725	39.44%	4,911,325	40.83%	4,454,010	39.47%	4,716,205	44.31%	5,350,245	53.63%	5,644,450	62.71%
Non-Indigenous / non-visible minority group	Southern European	1,821,240	12.98%	1,772,165	13.38%	1,671,705	13.21%	1,641,995	13.65%	1,445,855	12.81%	1,352,105	12.7%	1,224,890	12.28%	1,067,915	11.86%
Non-Indigenous / non-visible minority group	Western European	1,648,225	11.75%	1,766,975	13.34%	1,711,125	13.52%	1,685,670	14.01%	1,447,220	12.82%	1,452,345	13.65%	1,425,860	14.29%	1,295,080	14.39%
Non-Indigenous / non-visible minority group	French	1,324,505	9.44%	1,372,490	10.36%	1,384,660	10.94%	1,361,920	11.32%	1,241,895	11%	1,334,490	12.54%	1,422,405	14.26%	1,391,095	15.45%
Non-Indigenous / non-visible minority group	Eastern European	1,164,400	8.3%	1,339,605	10.12%	1,219,960	9.64%	1,171,165	9.74%	980,845	8.69%	903,655	8.49%	800,930	8.03%	695,675	7.73%
Non-Indigenous / non-visible minority group	Northern European	290,255	2.07%	266,080	2.01%	255,555	2.02%	245,595	2.04%	204,455	1.81%	197,435	1.86%	172,285	1.73%	152,590	1.7%
Non-Indigenous / non-visible minority group	European, n.i.e. & n.o.s.	213,280	1.52%	105,870	0.8%	196,060	1.55%	193,490	1.61%	207,730	1.84%	200,395	1.88%	200,035	2%	175,535	1.95%
Total non-Indigenous / non-visible minority population (Note: Single responses only unless otherwise specified.)		8,807,810	62.77%	8,982,180	67.83%	9,070,800	71.7%	9,041,195	75.16%	8,944,190	79.25%	8,823,885	82.91%	8,432,550	84.52%	8,058,550	89.53%
Visible minority (Note: Statistics Canada defines visible minorities as defined in the Employment Equity Act which defines visible minorities as "persons, other than Aboriginal peoples, who are non-Caucasian in race or non-white in colour".) group	South Asian	1,515,295	10.8%	1,150,410	8.69%	965,990	7.64%	794,170	6.6%	554,870	4.92%	390,055	3.66%	285,650	2.86%	152,465	1.69%
Visible minority group	Chinese	820,245	5.85%	754,550	5.7%	629,140	4.97%	576,980	4.8%	481,505	4.27%	391,090	3.67%	290,415	2.91%	168,110	1.87%
Visible minority group	Black	768,740	5.48%	627,715	4.74%	539,205	4.26%	473,765	3.94%	411,095	3.64%	356,215	3.35%	310,960	3.12%	218,660	2.43%
Visible minority group	Filipino	363,655	2.59%	311,670	2.35%	275,380	2.18%	203,220	1.69%	156,515	1.39%	117,365	1.1%	83,830	0.84%	48,025	0.53%
Visible minority group	Arab	284,215	2.03%	210,440	1.59%	151,645	1.2%	111,405	0.93%	88,540	0.78%	—N/a	—N/a	—N/a	—N/a	—N/a	—N/a
Visible minority group	Latin American	249,190	1.78%	195,950	1.48%	172,560	1.36%	147,135	1.22%	106,835	0.95%	85,745	0.81%	65,080	0.65%	30,030	0.33%
Visible minority group	West Asian	212,190	1.51%	154,670	1.17%	122,530	0.97%	96,615	0.8%	67,100	0.59%	—N/a	—N/a	—N/a	—N/a	—N/a	—N/a
Visible minority group	Multiple visible minorities	181,030	1.29%	128,590	0.97%	96,735	0.76%	77,405	0.64%	42,375	0.38%	35,160	0.33%	27,840	0.28%	23,085	0.26%
Visible minority group	Southeast Asian	167,845	1.2%	133,855	1.01%	137,875	1.09%	110,045	0.91%	86,410	0.77%	75,910	0.71%	52,725	0.53%	30,360	0.34%
Visible minority group	Visible minority, n.i.e.	124,120	0.88%	97,970	0.74%	81,130	0.64%	56,845	0.47%	78,915	0.7%	52,170	0.49%	715	0.01%	715	0.01%
Visible minority group	Korean	99,425	0.71%	88,940	0.67%	78,295	0.62%	69,540	0.58%	53,955	0.48%	35,400	0.33%	27,485	0.28%	18,125	0.2%
Visible minority group	Japanese	31,420	0.22%	30,835	0.23%	29,085	0.23%	28,080	0.23%	24,925	0.22%	24,275	0.23%	23,900	0.24%	20,060	0.22%
Visible minority group	Arab/West Asian	—N/a	—N/a	—N/a	—N/a	—N/a	—N/a	—N/a	—N/a	—N/a	—N/a	118,655	1.11%	129,010	1.29%	65,615	0.73%
Total visible minority population		4,817,360	34.33%	3,885,585	29.34%	3,279,565	25.92%	2,745,205	22.82%	2,153,045	19.08%	1,682,045	15.8%	1,297,605	13.01%	775,250	8.61%
Indigenous (Note: Statistics Canada defines Indigenous identity as persons who identify with the Indigenous Peoples of Canada.) group	First Nations	251,030	1.79%	236,685	1.79%	201,105	1.59%	158,400	1.32%	131,560	1.17%	112,825	1.06%	220,140 (Note: Including multiple Indigenous responses.)	2.21%	146,580	1.63%
Indigenous group	Métis	134,615	0.96%	120,585	0.91%	86,015	0.68%	73,610	0.61%	48,340	0.43%	21,530	0.2%	26,905	0.27%	14,330	0.16%
Indigenous group	Indigenous responses, n.i.e.	9,520	0.07%	7,540	0.06%	8,045	0.06%	6,540	0.05%	5,345	0.05%	—N/a	—N/a	—N/a	—N/a	—N/a	—N/a
Indigenous group	Multiple Indigenous responses	7,120	0.05%	5,725	0.04%	2,910	0.02%	1,910	0.02%	1,695	0.02%	1,350	0.01%	—N/a	—N/a	4,195	0.05%
Indigenous group	Inuk (Inuit)	4,310	0.03%	3,860	0.03%	3,355	0.03%	2,040	0.02%	1,380	0.01%	1,150	0.01%	5,245	0.05%	2,265	0.03%
Total Indigenous population		406,585	2.9%	374,395	2.83%	301,430	2.38%	242,495	2.02%	188,315	1.67%	136,860	1.29%	246,895	2.47%	167,370	1.86%
Total responses		14,031,755	98.65%	13,242,160	98.47%	12,651,795	98.44%	12,028,895	98.92%	11,285,550	98.91%	10,642,790	98.97%	9,977,050	98.93%	9,001,170	98.9%
Total population		14,223,942	100%	13,448,494	100%	12,851,821	100%	12,160,282	100%	11,410,046	100%	10,753,573	100%	10,084,885	100%	9,101,694	100%

== Language ==
The following figures are from the 2016 census. The tables includes languages that were selected by at least 0.99 per cent of respondents. Respondents to the census are able to provide multiple responses for questions relating to knowledge of languages, and mother tongue.

=== Knowledge of languages ===
Top languages known in Ontario 2021 census (Note: The question on knowledge of languages allows for multiple responses. The following figures are from the 2021 Canadian census.)
Language	Percent
English	97.28%
French	11.05%
Chinese (Note: Including total responses to all Chinese languages and dialects.)	5.23%
Hindi (Note: Note: Hindi and Urdu form mutually intelligible registers of the Hindustani language.)	3.11%
Spanish	2.86%
Punjabi	2.84%
Arabic	2.44%
Italian	2.23%
Tagalog	1.93%
Portuguese	1.49%

Top languages known in Ontario 1991 census (Note: The question on knowledge of languages allows for multiple responses. The following figures are from the 1991 Canadian census.)
Language	Percent
English	97.52%
French	11.93%
Italian	4.37%
German (Note: Including total responses to all High German languages.)	2.92%
Chinese	2.60%
Portuguese	1.77%
Spanish	1.62%
Polish	1.47%
Dutch	0.95%
Greek	0.88%

The question on knowledge of languages allows for multiple responses, and first appeared on the 1991 Canadian census. (Note: The 1991 Census was the first to ask Canadians whether they could conduct a conversation in a language other than English or French.)

Knowledge of Languages in Ontario (1991–2021)
Language	2021 Canadian census		2016 Canadian census		2011 Canadian census		2006 Canadian census		2001 Canadian census		1996 Canadian census		1991 Canadian census	
Language	Pop.	%	Pop.	%	Pop.	%	Pop.	%	Pop.	%	Pop.	%	Pop.	%
English	13,650,230	97.28%	12,879,045	97.26%	12,380,165	97.31%	11,713,030	97.37%	11,010,470	97.56%	10,351,060	97.26%	9,729,880	97.52%
French	1,550,545	11.05%	1,521,020	11.49%	1,438,785	11.31%	1,426,540	11.86%	1,362,025	12.07%	1,281,835	12.04%	1,190,485	11.93%
Chinese	734,190	5.23%	679,170	5.13%	614,605	4.83%	573,170	4.76%	481,895	4.27%	361,365	3.4%	259,600	2.6%
Hindi	436,125	3.11%	250,095	1.89%	201,455	1.58%	179,480	1.49%	124,545	1.1%	76,910	0.72%	54,925	0.55%
Spanish	401,210	2.86%	337,615	2.55%	303,620	2.39%	280,400	2.33%	228,860	2.03%	195,700	1.84%	161,880	1.62%
Punjabi	397,865	2.84%	282,065	2.13%	238,130	1.87%	201,720	1.68%	146,250	1.3%	99,140	0.93%	64,105	0.64%
Arabic	342,860	2.44%	246,015	1.86%	182,645	1.44%	152,225	1.27%	131,595	1.17%	99,475	0.93%	67,120	0.67%
Italian	312,800	2.23%	333,645	2.52%	352,770	2.77%	396,950	3.3%	416,210	3.69%	427,345	4.02%	435,975	4.37%
Urdu	295,175	2.1%	231,500	1.75%	177,945	1.4%	158,655	1.32%	103,765	0.92%	53,355	0.5%	34,405	0.34%
Tagalog	271,450	1.93%	232,935	1.76%	211,765	1.66%	159,100	1.32%	123,035	1.09%	95,820	0.9%	67,880	0.68%
Portuguese	208,570	1.49%	193,520	1.46%	182,240	1.43%	189,925	1.58%	182,865	1.62%	180,110	1.69%	177,065	1.77%
Tamil	192,890	1.37%	157,700	1.19%	149,030	1.17%	117,390	0.98%	92,465	0.82%	67,085	0.63%	29,275	0.29%
Persian (Note: Including total responses to all Persian Language dialects.)	183,830	1.31%	145,465	1.1%	115,685	0.91%	92,690	0.77%	67,730	0.6%	42,935	0.4%	29,520	0.3%
German	175,965	1.25%	199,500	1.51%	209,085	1.64%	249,805	2.08%	261,330	2.32%	277,620	2.61%	291,330	2.92%
Russian	155,340	1.11%	138,735	1.05%	125,770	0.99%	109,045	0.91%	91,645	0.81%	57,690	0.54%	40,835	0.41%
Gujarati	143,240	1.02%	103,890	0.78%	87,805	0.69%	76,910	0.64%	53,485	0.47%	40,605	0.38%	32,110	0.32%
Polish	134,980	0.96%	142,985	1.08%	146,765	1.15%	160,895	1.34%	164,260	1.46%	166,865	1.57%	146,540	1.47%
Vietnamese	105,805	0.75%	90,265	0.68%	87,240	0.69%	87,595	0.73%	76,140	0.67%	68,725	0.65%	47,505	0.48%
Serbo-Croatian	102,885	0.73%	115,560	0.87%	106,620	0.84%	112,000	0.93%	104,960	0.93%	83,630	0.79%	52,450	0.53%
Korean	90,475	0.64%	79,175	0.6%	71,170	0.56%	64,035	0.53%	49,180	0.44%	32,635	0.31%	24,610	0.25%
Greek	76,325	0.54%	80,690	0.61%	81,440	0.64%	85,480	0.71%	88,225	0.78%	89,785	0.84%	88,240	0.88%
Ukrainian	58,355	0.42%	54,615	0.41%	56,385	0.44%	64,400	0.54%	68,280	0.61%	67,760	0.64%	71,120	0.71%
Dutch	55,035	0.39%	63,410	0.48%	71,800	0.56%	80,650	0.67%	84,725	0.75%	89,290	0.84%	95,205	0.95%
Romanian	48,320	0.34%	49,635	0.37%	44,985	0.35%	44,245	0.37%	34,100	0.3%	22,755	0.21%	15,425	0.15%
Hebrew	47,380	0.34%	43,255	0.33%	40,835	0.32%	39,235	0.33%	37,500	0.33%	33,925	0.32%	28,970	0.29%
Hungarian	38,695	0.28%	42,545	0.32%	44,260	0.35%	49,425	0.41%	53,275	0.47%	53,905	0.51%	55,730	0.56%
Creoles	36,585	0.26%	30,260	0.23%	23,545	0.19%	14,910	0.12%	10,470	0.09%	8,990	0.08%	5,770	0.06%
Japanese	30,700	0.22%	25,675	0.19%	23,340	0.18%	22,255	0.19%	20,780	0.18%	17,495	0.16%	15,270	0.15%
Ojibway–Potawatomi	21,560	0.15%	23,980	0.18%	17,970	0.14%	23,620	0.2%	19,000	0.17%	19,585	0.18%	17,835	0.18%
Armenian	19,610	0.14%	18,435	0.14%	15,530	0.12%	15,160	0.13%	14,325	0.13%	13,265	0.12%	12,295	0.12%
Scandinavian (Note: Total responses to all Scandinavian–North Germanic languages, including Danish, Icelandic, Norwegian, and Swedish.)	12,565	0.09%	12,990	0.1%	14,190	0.11%	15,150	0.13%	16,810	0.15%	17,400	0.16%	18,735	0.19%
Finnish	9,455	0.07%	11,145	0.08%	11,980	0.09%	15,060	0.13%	16,425	0.15%	19,365	0.18%	21,185	0.21%
Cree (Note: Including total responses to all Cree–Innu language dialects.)	5,210	0.04%	6,560	0.05%	5,010	0.04%	4,840	0.04%	5,335	0.05%	7,105	0.07%	5,390	0.05%
Total responses	14,031,750	98.6%	13,242,160	98.5%	12,722,060	99%	12,028,895	98.9%	11,285,545	98.9%	10,642,790	99%	9,977,055	98.9%
Total population	14,223,942	100%	13,448,494	100%	12,851,821	100%	12,160,282	100%	11,410,046	100%	10,753,573	100%	10,084,885	100%

=== Mother tongue ===
Language	Responses	% (Note: The following is the total figure from all respondents, including single, and multi-answered respondents.)
Single responses
English	8,902,320	66.87
French	490,715	3.68
Mandarin	283,735	2.13
Cantonese	275,315	2.07
Italian	231,040	1.74
Punjabi	197,060	1.48
Spanish	191,025	1.43
Arabic	171,370	1.29
Urdu	152,385	1.14
Portuguese	150,000	1.13
Tagalog	163,415	1.23
German	131,525	0.99
Multiple responses
English and French	54,045	0.51
English and non-official language	288,285	2.17
French and non-official language	12,565	0.09
English, French, and non-official language	11,010	0.08

== Religion ==
Religious groups in Ontario (1981−2021)
Religious group	2021 Canadian census		2011 Canadian census		2001 Canadian census		1991 Canadian census		1981 Canadian census	
Religious group	Pop.	%	Pop.	%	Pop.	%	Pop.	%	Pop.	%
Christianity	7,315,810	52.14%	8,167,295	64.55%	8,413,495	74.55%	8,160,730	81.79%	7,622,530	89.32%
Irreligion	4,433,675	31.6%	2,927,790	23.14%	1,841,290	16.32%	1,247,640	12.51%	620,815	7.27%
Islam	942,990	6.72%	581,950	4.6%	352,525	3.12%	145,560	1.46%	52,110	0.61%
Hinduism	573,700	4.09%	366,720	2.9%	217,560	1.93%	106,705	1.07%	41,655	0.49%
Sikhism	300,435	2.14%	179,765	1.42%	104,790	0.93%	50,085	0.5%	16,645	0.2%
Buddhism	164,215	1.17%	163,750	1.29%	128,320	1.14%	65,325	0.65%	18,595	0.22%
Judaism	196,100	1.4%	195,540	1.55%	190,795	1.69%	175,640	1.76%	148,255	1.74%
Indigenous spirituality	15,985	0.11%	15,905	0.13%	7,265	0.06%	2,780	0.03%	2,180	0.03%
Other	88,845	0.63%	53,080	0.42%	29,505	0.26%	22,590	0.23%	11,475	0.13%
Total responses	14,031,750	98.65%	12,651,795	98.44%	11,285,545	98.91%	9,977,055	98.93%	8,534,260	98.95%
Total population	14,223,942	100%	12,851,821	100%	11,410,046	100%	10,084,885	100%	8,625,107	100%

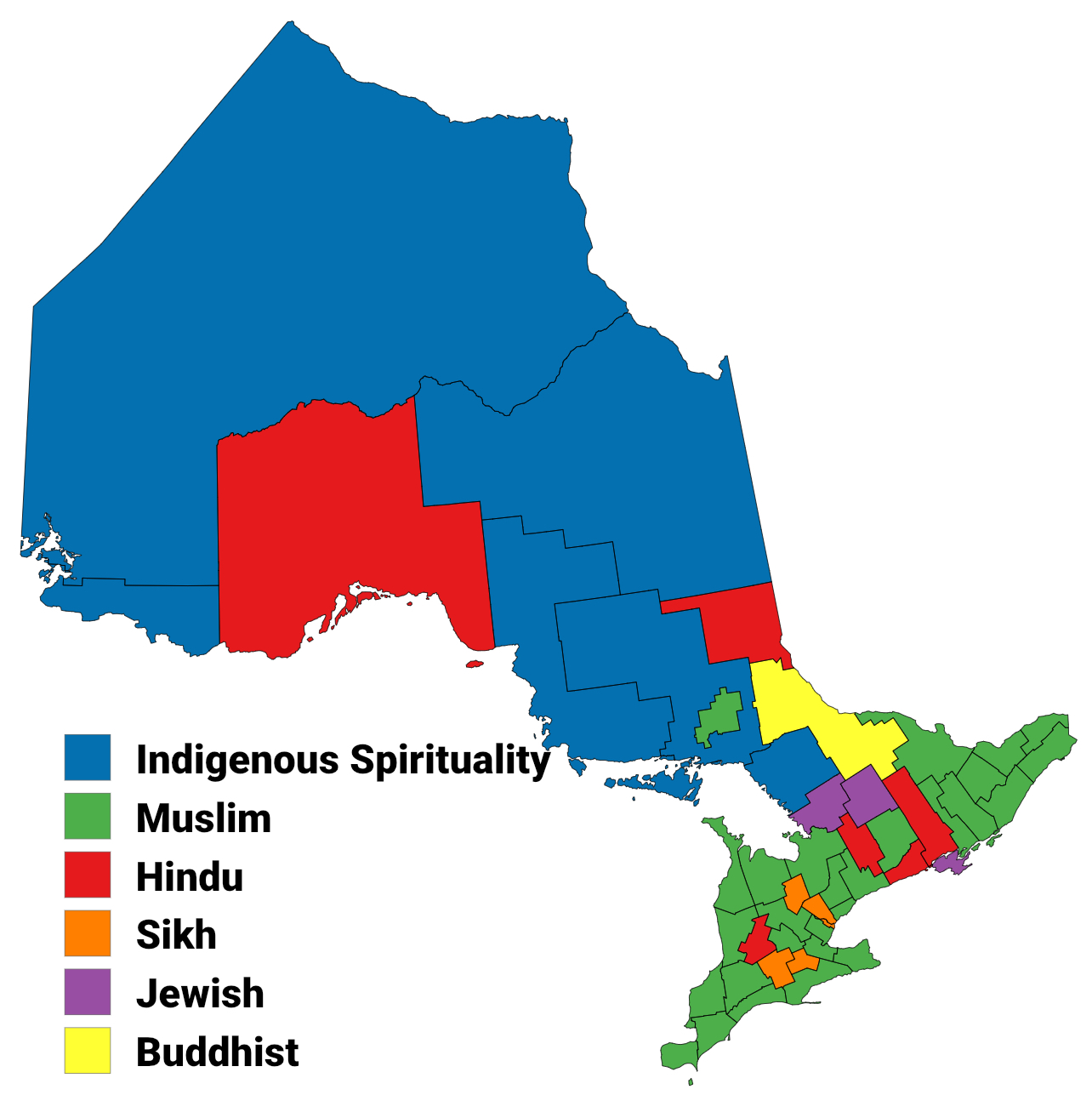
Largest non-Christian religion in Ontario by census division, 2021 census

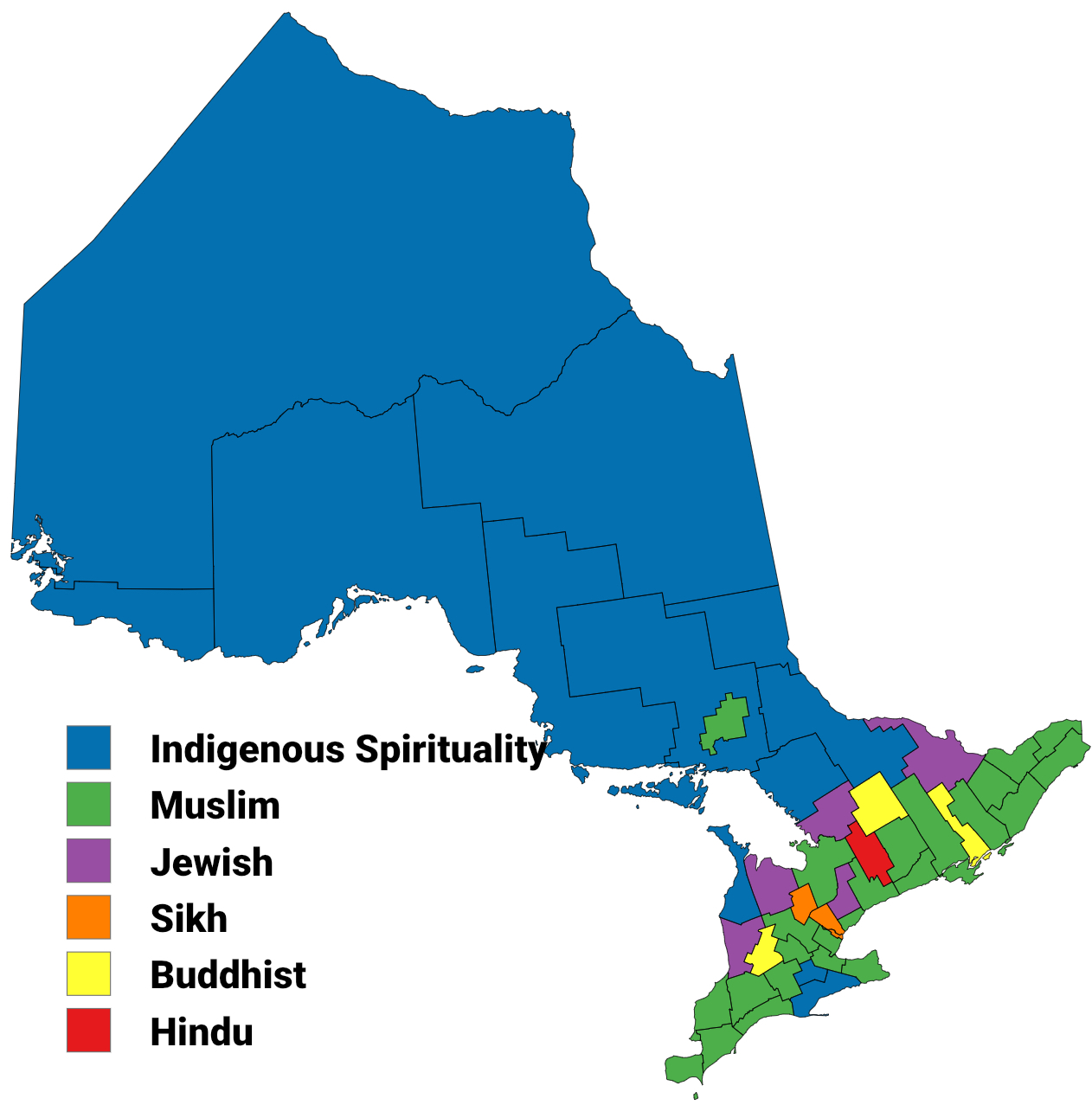
Largest non-Christian religion in Ontario by census division, 2011 census

Religion in Ontario in 2011, Statscan National Household Survey

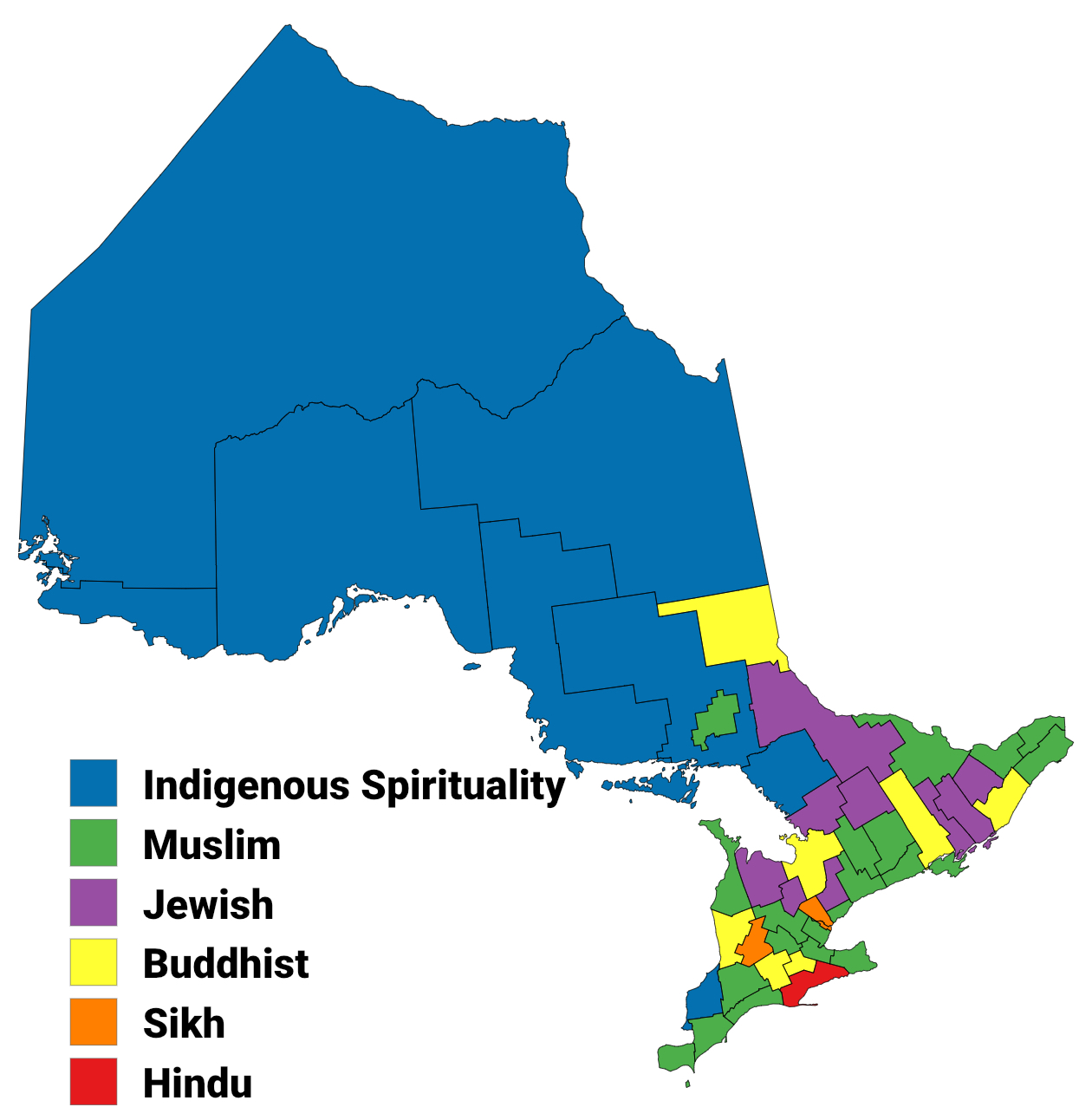
Largest non-Christian religion in Ontario by census division, 2001 census

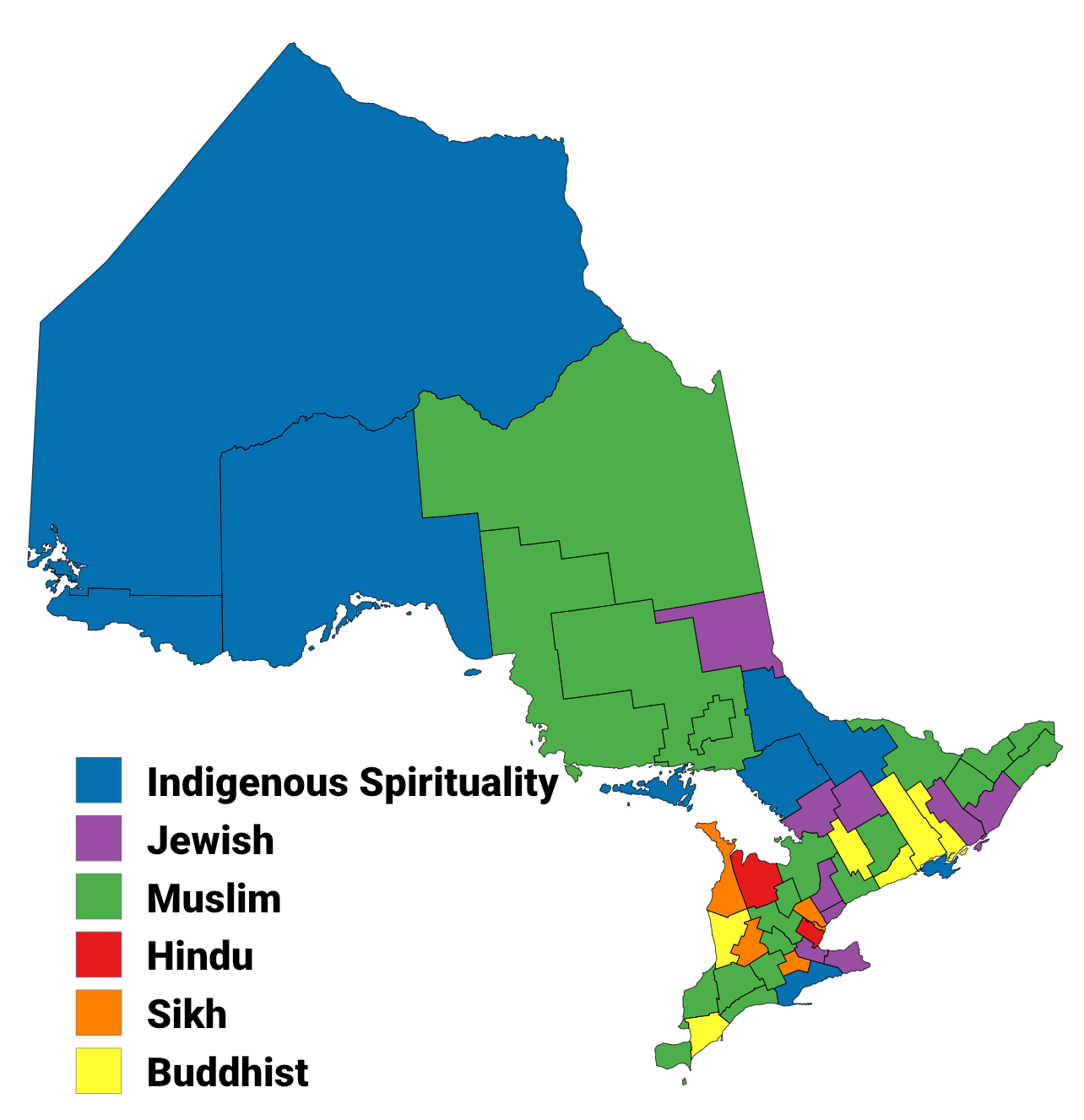
Largest non-Christian religion in Ontario by census division, 1991 census

== Migration ==
=== Immigration ===
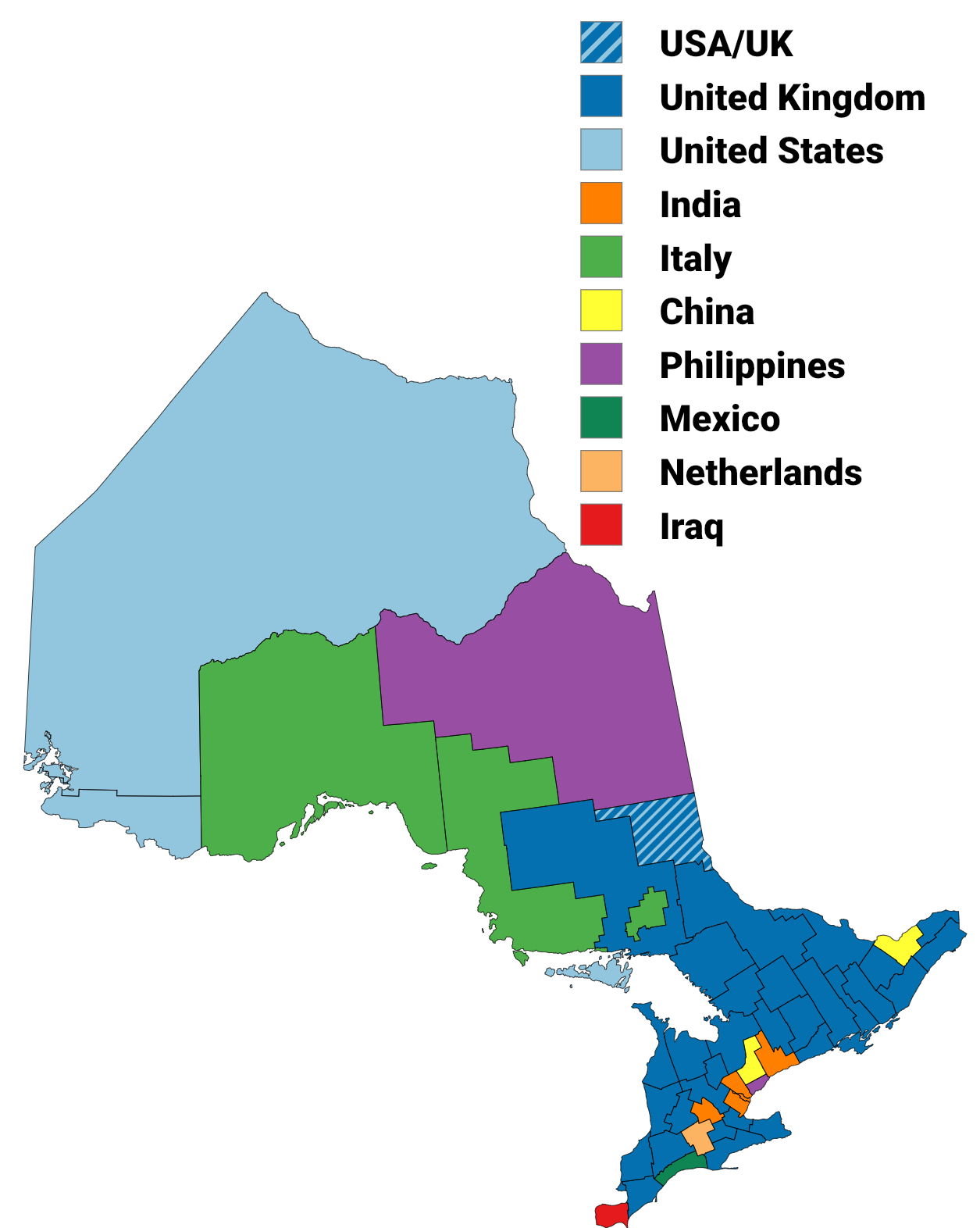
Largest nation of birth of immigrants by census division, 2021 Census

Ontario is a very diverse province. For example, 54.8% of the population of Toronto was born outside Canada, which is the second-largest percentage of immigrants in a single city on Earth, after Miami. Hamilton is ranked the third-most diverse urbanized area in Canada (after Toronto and Vancouver).

Ontario immigration statistics (1842–2021)
Census year	Immigrant percentage	Immigrant population	Total responses	Total population	Source(s)
1842 Census of Upper Canada	46.28%	225,419	487,053	487,053	
1851 Census of Canada West	42%	399,868	952,004	952,004	
1861 Census of Canada West	35.33%	493,212	1,396,091	1,396,091	
1871 Canadian census	27.31%	442,608	1,620,851	1,620,851	
1881 Canadian census	22.19%	427,508	1,926,922	1,926,922	
1891 Canadian census	19.08%	403,389	2,114,321	2,114,321	
1901 Canadian census	14.85%	324,160	2,182,947	2,182,947	
1911 Canadian census	20.09%	507,846	2,527,292	2,527,292	
1921 Canadian census	21.87%	641,683	2,933,662	2,933,662	
1931 Canadian census	23.44%	804,285	3,431,683	3,431,683	
1941 Canadian census	19.36%	733,282	3,787,655	3,787,655	
1951 Canadian census	18.49%	849,965	4,597,542	4,597,542	
1961 Canadian census	21.7%	1,353,157	6,236,092	6,236,092	
1971 Canadian census	22.17%	1,707,400	7,703,110	7,703,106	
1981 Canadian census	23.74%	2,025,750	8,534,260	8,625,107	
1986 Canadian census	23.12%	2,081,195	9,001,170	9,101,694	
1991 Canadian census	23.75%	2,369,175	9,977,055	10,084,885	
1996 Canadian census	25.6%	2,724,485	10,642,790	10,753,573	
2001 Canadian census	26.85%	3,030,075	11,285,545	11,410,046	
2006 Canadian census	28.25%	3,398,725	12,028,895	12,160,282	
2011 Canadian census	28.54%	3,611,365	12,651,795	12,851,821	
2016 Canadian census	29.09%	3,852,145	13,242,160	13,448,494	
2021 Canadian census	29.98%	4,206,585	14,031,750	14,223,942	

The 2021 census reported that immigrants (individuals born outside Canada) comprise 4,206,585 persons or 30.0 percent of the total population of Ontario.

Immigrants in Ontario by country of birth
Country of birth	2021 census		2016 census		2011 census		2006 census		2001 census		1996 census		1991 census		1986 census		1981 census		1971 census		1961 census		1951 census		1941 census		1931 census	
Country of birth	Pop.	%	Pop.	%	Pop.	%	Pop.	%	Pop.	%	Pop.	%	Pop.	%	Pop.	%	Pop.	%	Pop.	%	Pop.	%	Pop.	%	Pop.	%	Pop.	%
India	495,750	11.8%	360,545	9.4%	310,410	8.6%	258,530	7.6%	174,560	5.8%	121,370	4.5%	88,445	3.7%	61,705	3%	50,860	2.5%	17,025	1%	3,083	0.2%	1,279	0.2%	1,090	0.1%	1,101	0.1%
China & Taiwan	374,060 (Note: China: 355,955 / Taiwan: 18,105)	8.9%	335,055 (Note: China: 317,220 / Taiwan: 17,835)	8.7%	285,200 (Note: China: 267,780 / Taiwan: 17,420)	7.9%	246,920 (Note: China: 229,950 / Taiwan: 16,970)	7.3%	181,715 (Note: China: 164,885 / Taiwan: 16,830)	6%	118,290 (Note: China: 104,195 / Taiwan: 14,095)	4.3%	75,160 (Note: China: 67,625 / Taiwan: 7,535)	3.2%	52,140 (Note: China: 48,185 / Taiwan: 3,955)	2.5%	42,350 (Note: China: 20,320 / Taiwan: 22,030)	2.1%	18,735	1.1%	9,999	0.7%	5,581	0.7%	5,497	0.7%	6,524	0.8%
Philippines	268,575	6.4%	231,760	6%	204,035	5.6%	151,375	4.5%	119,215	3.9%	94,570	3.5%	61,300	2.6%	38,570	1.9%	32,070	1.6%	—N/a	—N/a	—N/a	—N/a	—N/a	—N/a	—N/a	—N/a	—N/a	—N/a
United Kingdom	239,485	5.7%	264,120	6.9%	291,935	8.1%	321,645	9.5%	342,900	11.3%	371,515	13.6%	408,875	17.3%	452,345	21.7%	496,530	24.5%	517,495	30.3%	464,960	34.4%	403,057	47.4%	394,897	53.9%	461,986	57.4%
Jamaica & Trinidad and Tobago	175,515 (Note: Jamaica: 122,765 / Trinidad and Tobago: 52,750)	4.2%	172,650 (Note: Jamaica: 119,840 / Trinidad and Tobago: 52,810)	4.5%	166,150 (Note: Jamaica: 111,470 / Trinidad and Tobago: 54,680)	4.6%	162,415 (Note: Jamaica: 109,360 / Trinidad and Tobago: 53,055)	4.8%	157,005 (Note: Jamaica: 105,410 / Trinidad and Tobago: 51,595)	5.2%	148,730 (Note: Jamaica: 100,330 / Trinidad and Tobago: 48,400)	5.5%	124,190 (Note: Jamaica: 86,465 / Trinidad and Tobago: 37,725)	5.2%	102,565 (Note: Jamaica: 73,650 / Trinidad and Tobago: 28,915)	4.9%	90,590	4.5%	31,255	1.8%	6,520 (Note: All individuals born in the British West Indies.)	0.5%	1,870	0.2%	1,833	0.2%	1,906	0.2%
Pakistan	165,530	3.9%	142,265	3.7%	114,595	3.2%	100,940	3%	60,385	2%	27,565	1%	17,125	0.7%	10,695	0.5%	9,095	0.4%	2,695	0.2%	—N/a	—N/a	—N/a	—N/a	—N/a	—N/a	—N/a	—N/a
Italy	135,640	3.2%	157,815	4.1%	170,710	4.7%	198,315	5.8%	210,540	6.9%	221,530	8.1%	233,905	9.9%	241,845	11.6%	255,545	12.6%	254,150	14.9%	161,730	12%	34,809	4.1%	21,914	3%	22,179	2.8%
Sri Lanka	112,730	2.7%	109,855	2.9%	110,800	3.1%	89,610	2.6%	72,990	2.4%	56,835	2.1%	19,490	0.8%	5,280	0.3%	2,645	0.1%	—N/a	—N/a	—N/a	—N/a	—N/a	—N/a	—N/a	—N/a	—N/a	—N/a
United States	111,390	2.6%	109,005	2.8%	115,045	3.2%	106,405	3.1%	98,190	3.2%	97,750	3.6%	98,130	4.1%	106,210	5.1%	109,320	5.4%	101,440	5.9%	81,463	6%	72,303	8.5%	71,847	9.8%	72,525	9%
Hong Kong	108,480	2.6%	108,035	2.8%	105,855	2.9%	111,630	3.3%	119,615	3.9%	120,145	4.4%	80,390	3.4%	36,650	1.8%	26,235	1.3%	—N/a	—N/a	—N/a	—N/a	—N/a	—N/a	—N/a	—N/a	—N/a	—N/a
Iran	103,795	2.5%	86,810	2.3%	70,305	1.9%	54,500	1.6%	42,315	1.4%	27,205	1%	16,990	0.7%	6,385	0.3%	3,900	0.2%	—N/a	—N/a	—N/a	—N/a	—N/a	—N/a	—N/a	—N/a	—N/a	—N/a
Portugal	95,490	2.3%	103,020	2.7%	103,760	2.9%	109,945	3.2%	110,870	3.7%	115,275	4.2%	116,295	4.9%	97,155	4.7%	95,610	4.7%	47,730	2.8%	—N/a	—N/a	—N/a	—N/a	—N/a	—N/a	—N/a	—N/a
Poland	88,785	2.1%	96,000	2.5%	101,815	2.8%	110,930	3.3%	116,105	3.8%	122,455	4.5%	109,480	4.6%	82,950	4%	75,455	3.7%	78,375	4.6%	79,706	5.9%	70,588	8.3%	49,433	6.7%	46,265	5.8%
Russia & Ukraine	87,235 (Note: Russia: 44,165 / Ukraine: 43,070)	2.1%	82,925 (Note: Russia: 42,980 / Ukraine: 39,945)	2.2%	80,880 (Note: Russia: 41,920 / Ukraine: 38,960)	2.2%	73,450 (Note: Russia: 37,120 / Ukraine: 36,330)	2.2%	59,710 (Note: Russia: 28,630 / Ukraine: 31,080)	2%	62,380 (Note: Includes total persons born in all republics of the Soviet Union.)	2.3%	54,835	2.3%	56,230	2.7%	62,885	3.1%	70,610	4.1%	75,616	5.6%	60,334	7.1%	26,316	3.6%	26,109	3.2%
Former Yugoslavia	87,010	2.1%	92,425	2.4%	92,950	2.6%	101,450	3%	99,760	3.3%	84,725	3.1%	64,655	2.7%	63,685	3.1%	65,255	3.2%	55,850	3.3%	33,596	2.5%	13,904	1.6%	10,354	1.4%	8,487	1.1%
Vietnam	86,315	2.1%	80,530	2.1%	79,645	2.2%	79,400	2.3%	71,900	2.4%	67,965	2.5%	51,025	2.2%	32,255	1.5%	17,660	0.9%	—N/a	—N/a	—N/a	—N/a	—N/a	—N/a	—N/a	—N/a	—N/a	—N/a
Syria & Lebanon	83,850 (Note: Syria: 45,685 / Lebanon: 38,165)	2%	57,225 (Note: Syria: 22,680 / Lebanon: 34,545)	1.5%	39,765 (Note: Syria: 9,630 / Lebanon: 30,135)	1.1%	36,665 (Note: Syria: 7,455 / Lebanon: 29,210)	1.1%	34,055 (Note: Syria: 6,010 / Lebanon: 28,045)	1.1%	30,155 (Note: Syria: 4,655 / Lebanon: 25,500)	1.1%	24,760 (Note: Syria: 3,535 / Lebanon: 21,225)	1%	13,185 (Note: Syria: 2,245 / Lebanon: 10,940)	0.6%	10,045	0.5%	—N/a	—N/a	—N/a	—N/a	—N/a	—N/a	1,179	0.2%	1,301	0.2%
Guyana	77,635	1.8%	79,745	2.1%	80,075	2.2%	78,380	2.3%	75,280	2.5%	69,195	2.5%	57,665	2.4%	43,735	2.1%	32,045	1.6%	—N/a	—N/a	—N/a	—N/a	—N/a	—N/a	—N/a	—N/a	—N/a	—N/a
Iraq	63,255	1.5%	50,395	1.3%	36,350	1%	25,295	0.7%	19,385	0.6%	12,395	0.5%	4,975	0.2%	2,795	0.1%	—N/a	—N/a	—N/a	—N/a	—N/a	—N/a	—N/a	—N/a	—N/a	—N/a	—N/a	—N/a
South Korea	62,745	1.5%	57,085	1.5%	55,485	1.5%	49,595	1.5%	38,390	1.3%	24,750	0.9%	19,495	0.8%	13,735	0.7%	6,405	0.3%	—N/a	—N/a	—N/a	—N/a	—N/a	—N/a	—N/a	—N/a	—N/a	—N/a
Germany & Austria	61,480 (Note: Germany: 54,275 / Austria: 7,205)	1.5%	71,660 (Note: Germany: 63,460 / Austria: 8,200)	1.9%	77,365 (Note: Germany: 68,170 / Austria: 9,195)	2.1%	90,855 (Note: Germany: 80,100 / Austria: 10,755)	2.7%	94,325 (Note: Germany: 82,530 / Austria: 11,795)	3.1%	100,235 (Note: Germany: 86,805 / Austria: 13,430)	3.7%	102,900 (Note: Germany: 89,040 / Austria: 13,860)	4.3%	108,595 (Note: Germany: 92,790 / Austria: 15,805)	5.2%	110,100 (Note: Germany: 93,565 / Austria: 16,535)	5.4%	120,585	7.1%	115,956	8.6%	24,747	2.9%	18,509	2.5%	18,204	2.3%
Nigeria & Ghana	54,725 (Note: Nigeria: 37,420 / Ghana: 17,305)	1.3%	36,555 (Note: Nigeria: 20,630 / Ghana: 15,925)	0.9%	33,370 (Note: Nigeria: 17,220 / Ghana: 16,150)	0.9%	25,105 (Note: Nigeria: 10,690 / Ghana: 14,415)	0.7%	18,875 (Note: Nigeria: 6,295 / Ghana: 12,580)	0.6%	12,930 (Note: Nigeria: 3,060 / Ghana: 9,870)	0.5%	7,205	0.3%	3,125	0.2%	2,585	0.1%	—N/a	—N/a	—N/a	—N/a	—N/a	—N/a	—N/a	—N/a	—N/a	—N/a
Bangladesh	46,255	1.1%	39,410	1%	30,210	0.8%	22,625	0.7%	14,620	0.5%	5,660	0.2%	2,545	0.1%	960	0%	695	0%	—N/a	—N/a	—N/a	—N/a	—N/a	—N/a	—N/a	—N/a	—N/a	—N/a
Romania	40,475	1%	42,720	1.1%	40,695	1.1%	41,145	1.2%	33,725	1.1%	23,720	0.9%	17,500	0.7%	12,300	0.6%	11,480	0.6%	10,530	0.6%	10,964	0.8%	7,317	0.9%	7,762	1.1%	9,140	1.1%
Netherlands	39,490	0.9%	47,400	1.2%	53,395	1.5%	61,620	1.8%	65,430	2.2%	70,145	2.6%	73,700	3.1%	76,430	3.7%	78,765	3.9%	78,905	4.6%	79,388	5.9%	24,178	2.8%	3,639	0.5%	3,774	0.5%
Egypt	39,345	0.9%	34,505	0.9%	26,200	0.7%	19,555	0.6%	17,195	0.6%	13,810	0.5%	9,765	0.4%	7,035	0.3%	6,410	0.3%	—N/a	—N/a	—N/a	—N/a	—N/a	—N/a	—N/a	—N/a	—N/a	—N/a
Afghanistan	38,585	0.9%	33,145	0.9%	26,385	0.7%	23,630	0.7%	14,735	0.5%	7,635	0.3%	4,280	0.2%	640	0%	—N/a	—N/a	—N/a	—N/a	—N/a	—N/a	—N/a	—N/a	—N/a	—N/a	—N/a	—N/a
Kenya & Tanzania & Uganda	35,125 (Note: Kenya: 15,595 / Tanzania: 11,850 / Uganda: 7,680)	0.8%	33,355 (Note: Kenya: 14,935 / Tanzania: 11,445 / Uganda: 6,975)	0.9%	32,175 (Note: Kenya: 14,170 / Tanzania: 11,160 / Uganda: 6,845)	0.9%	30,135 (Note: Kenya: 12,860 / Tanzania: 11,600 / Uganda: 5,675)	0.9%	28,390 (Note: Kenya: 11,495 / Tanzania: 10,865 / Uganda: 6,030)	0.9%	26,265 (Note: Kenya: 10,130 / Tanzania: 10,440 / Uganda: 5,695)	1%	23,615 (Note: Kenya: 9,325 / Tanzania: 9,980 / Uganda: 4,310)	1%	16,860 (Note: Kenya: 5,050 / Tanzania: 7,260 / Uganda: 4,550)	0.8%	14,890	0.7%	—N/a	—N/a	—N/a	—N/a	—N/a	—N/a	—N/a	—N/a	—N/a	—N/a
El Salvador & Guatemala & Nicaragua	34,785 (Note: El Salvador: 21,775 / Guatemala: 7,605 / Nicaragua: 5,405)	0.8%	33,390 (Note: El Salvador: 20,920 / Guatemala: 7,160 / Nicaragua: 5,310)	0.9%	31,295 (Note: El Salvador: 19,645 / Guatemala: 6,685 / Nicaragua: 4,965)	0.9%	31,480 (Note: El Salvador: 19,595 / Guatemala: 7,000 / Nicaragua: 4,885)	0.9%	28,430 (Note: El Salvador: 17,140 / Guatemala: 5,825 / Nicaragua: 5,465)	0.9%	28,270 (Note: El Salvador: 17,675 / Guatemala: 5,820 / Nicaragua: 4,775)	1%	18,585 (Note: El Salvador: 11,905 / Guatemala: 3,620 / Nicaragua: 3,060)	0.8%	6,715 (Note: El Salvador: 4,425 / Guatemala: 1,790 / Nicaragua: 500)	0.3%	2,335	0.1%	—N/a	—N/a	—N/a	—N/a	—N/a	—N/a	—N/a	—N/a	—N/a	—N/a
Ethiopia & Eritrea	33,615 (Note: Ethiopia: 19,415 / Eritrea: 14,200)	0.8%	22,500 (Note: Ethiopia: 15,570 / Eritrea: 6,930)	0.6%	17,295 (Note: Ethiopia: 13,150 / Eritrea: 4,145)	0.5%	16,000 (Note: Ethiopia: 11,815 / Eritrea: 4,185)	0.5%	12,585 (Note: Ethiopia: 9,655 / Eritrea: 2,930)	0.4%	12,930	0.5%	7,670	0.3%	1,120	0.1%	—N/a	—N/a	—N/a	—N/a	—N/a	—N/a	—N/a	—N/a	—N/a	—N/a	—N/a	—N/a
Mexico	33,385	0.8%	30,080	0.8%	27,180	0.8%	22,275	0.7%	17,805	0.6%	13,685	0.5%	9,730	0.4%	6,150	0.3%	4,500	0.2%	—N/a	—N/a	—N/a	—N/a	—N/a	—N/a	—N/a	—N/a	—N/a	—N/a
Colombia	32,520	0.8%	28,815	0.7%	26,720	0.7%	18,865	0.6%	8,085	0.3%	5,285	0.2%	4,140	0.2%	2,870	0.1%	—N/a	—N/a	—N/a	—N/a	—N/a	—N/a	—N/a	—N/a	—N/a	—N/a	—N/a	—N/a
Greece	31,650	0.8%	36,575	0.9%	39,410	1.1%	42,230	1.2%	45,030	1.5%	47,490	1.7%	49,255	2.1%	50,450	2.4%	51,690	2.6%	45,435	2.7%	20,291	1.5%	5,731	0.7%	3,570	0.5%	2,936	0.4%
Israel & Palestine	23,325	0.6%	21,275	0.6%	19,045	0.5%	17,695	0.5%	13,860	0.5%	12,805	0.5%	10,290	0.4%	7,330	0.4%	6,030	0.3%	—N/a	—N/a	—N/a	—N/a	—N/a	—N/a	—N/a	—N/a	—N/a	—N/a
Brazil	23,125	0.5%	14,710	0.4%	11,810	0.3%	8,860	0.3%	6,890	0.2%	5,235	0.2%	4,185	0.2%	2,645	0.1%	2,330	0.1%	—N/a	—N/a	—N/a	—N/a	—N/a	—N/a	—N/a	—N/a	—N/a	—N/a
South Africa	21,540	0.5%	19,390	0.5%	18,405	0.5%	18,155	0.5%	17,420	0.6%	15,770	0.6%	13,785	0.6%	11,170	0.5%	9,050	0.4%	—N/a	—N/a	1,752	0.1%	694	0.1%	723	0.1%	721	0.1%
France & Belgium	20,995 (Note: France: 15,240 / Belgium: 5,755)	0.5%	19,490 (Note: France: 13,385 / Belgium: 6,105)	0.5%	19,610 (Note: France: 12,935 / Belgium: 6,675)	0.5%	18,995 (Note: France: 11,440 / Belgium: 7,555)	0.6%	18,815 (Note: France: 11,010 / Belgium: 7,805)	0.6%	18,815 (Note: France: 10,210 / Belgium: 8,605)	0.7%	18,680 (Note: France: 9,660 / Belgium: 9,020)	0.8%	19,935 (Note: France: 9,850 / Belgium: 10,085)	1%	20,535 (Note: France: 9,760 / Belgium: 10,775)	1%	20,800	1.2%	19,015	1.4%	9,512	1.1%	6,727	0.9%	7,439	0.9%
Turkey	20,795	0.5%	14,995	0.4%	13,875	0.4%	12,140	0.4%	8,790	0.3%	7,280	0.3%	5,845	0.2%	5,175	0.2%	4,255	0.2%	—N/a	—N/a	—N/a	—N/a	—N/a	—N/a	560	0.1%	492	0.1%
United Arab Emirates	20,415	0.5%	15,150	0.4%	10,475	0.3%	7,630	0.2%	4,435	0.1%	1,780	0.1%	—N/a	—N/a	—N/a	—N/a	—N/a	—N/a	—N/a	—N/a	—N/a	—N/a	—N/a	—N/a	—N/a	—N/a	—N/a	—N/a
Somalia	20,335	0.5%	16,970	0.4%	16,390	0.5%	15,540	0.5%	16,145	0.5%	14,575	0.5%	4,680	0.2%	75	0%	—N/a	—N/a	—N/a	—N/a	—N/a	—N/a	—N/a	—N/a	—N/a	—N/a	—N/a	—N/a
Saudi Arabia	20,085	0.5%	13,345	0.3%	9,060	0.3%	8,140	0.2%	6,425	0.2%	2,875	0.1%	—N/a	—N/a	—N/a	—N/a	—N/a	—N/a	—N/a	—N/a	—N/a	—N/a	—N/a	—N/a	—N/a	—N/a	—N/a	—N/a
Hungary	18,525	0.4%	22,085	0.6%	23,510	0.7%	27,040	0.8%	28,955	1%	31,245	1.1%	33,350	1.4%	35,115	1.7%	36,850	1.8%	38,050	2.2%	37,288	2.8%	17,747	2.1%	14,626	2%	10,474	1.3%
Czech Republic & Slovakia	16,130	0.4%	18,460	0.5%	18,055	0.5%	20,475	0.6%	21,280	0.7%	21,910	0.8%	22,980	1%	22,760	1.1%	23,005	1.1%	24,065	1.4%	18,878	1.4%	15,492	1.8%	11,658	1.6%	7,954	1%
Malaysia & Singapore	15,320 (Note: Malaysia: 10,385 / Singapore: 4,935)	0.4%	14,005 (Note: Malaysia: 9,760 / Singapore: 4,245)	0.4%	13,435 (Note: Malaysia: 9,150 / Singapore: 4,285)	0.4%	13,175 (Note: Malaysia: 9,085 / Singapore: 4,090)	0.4%	12,195 (Note: Malaysia: 8,660 / Singapore: 3,535)	0.4%	11,270 (Note: Malaysia: 8,140 / Singapore: 3,130)	0.4%	9,100 (Note: Malaysia: 6,375 / Singapore: 2,725)	0.4%	5,230 (Note: Malaysia: 3,630 / Singapore: 1,600)	0.3%	—N/a	—N/a	—N/a	—N/a	—N/a	—N/a	—N/a	—N/a	—N/a	—N/a	—N/a	—N/a
DR Congo & Cameroon	14,745 (Note: DR Congo: 10,225 / Cameroon: 4,520)	0.4%	11,010 (Note: DR Congo: 7,640 / Cameroon: 3,370)	0.3%	7,930 (Note: DR Congo: 5,995 / Cameroon: 1,935)	0.2%	5,055 (Note: DR Congo: 4,325 / Cameroon: 730)	0.1%	3,030 (Note: DR Congo: 2,665 / Cameroon: 365)	0.1%	1,370 (Note: DR Congo: 1,210 / Cameroon: 160)	0.1%	770	0%	580	0%	195	0%	—N/a	—N/a	—N/a	—N/a	—N/a	—N/a	—N/a	—N/a	—N/a	—N/a
Ireland	14,430	0.3%	15,275	0.4%	16,995	0.5%	13,290	0.4%	15,535	0.5%	17,860	0.7%	17,750	0.7%	15,405	0.7%	9,965	0.5%	21,935	1.3%	52,757	3.9%	40,626	4.8%	42,276	5.8%	52,414	6.5%
Albania	13,430	0.3%	11,890	0.3%	11,125	0.3%	8,510	0.3%	4,465	0.1%	675	0%	—N/a	—N/a	—N/a	—N/a	—N/a	—N/a	—N/a	—N/a	—N/a	—N/a	—N/a	—N/a	—N/a	—N/a	—N/a	—N/a
Scandinavia (Note: Includes Denmark, Finland, Iceland, Norway and Sweden.)	12,925	0.3%	14,170	0.4%	15,365	0.4%	17,970	0.5%	19,130	0.6%	21,775	0.8%	22,860	1%	25,685	1.2%	28,150	1.4%	32,780	1.9%	38,067	2.8%	25,441	3%	25,696	3.5%	29,436	3.7%
Ecuador	12,765	0.3%	12,250	0.3%	11,070	0.3%	11,760	0.3%	9,585	0.3%	8,625	0.3%	7,175	0.3%	5,825	0.3%	5,165	0.3%	—N/a	—N/a	—N/a	—N/a	—N/a	—N/a	—N/a	—N/a	—N/a	—N/a
Australia & New Zealand	10,875	0.3%	9,695	0.3%	9,280	0.3%	9,170	0.3%	7,840	0.3%	7,600	0.3%	8,245	0.3%	8,175	0.4%	7,590	0.4%	7,710	0.5%	3,799	0.3%	1,680	0.2%	1,011	0.1%	1,085	0.1%
Total immigrants	4,206,585	30%	3,852,145	29.1%	3,611,365	28.5%	3,398,725	28.3%	3,030,075	26.8%	2,724,485	25.6%	2,369,175	23.7%	2,081,195	23.1%	2,025,750	23.7%	1,707,400	22.2%	1,353,157	21.7%	849,965	18.5%	733,282	19.4%	804,285	23.4%
Total responses	14,031,750	98.6%	13,242,160	98.5%	12,651,795	98.4%	12,028,895	98.9%	11,285,545	98.9%	10,642,790	99%	9,977,055	98.9%	9,001,170	98.9%	8,534,260	98.9%	7,703,105	100%	6,236,092	100%	4,597,542	100%	3,787,655	100%	3,431,683	100%
Total population	14,223,942	100%	13,448,494	100%	12,851,821	100%	12,160,282	100%	11,410,046	100%	10,753,573	100%	10,084,885	100%	9,101,694	100%	8,625,107	100%	7,703,106	100%	6,236,092	100%	4,597,542	100%	3,787,655	100%	3,431,683	100%

=== Recent immigration ===
The 2021 Canadian census counted a total of 584,680 people who immigrated to Ontario between 2016 and 2021.

Recent immigrants to Ontario by country of birth (2016 to 2021)
Country of birth	Population	% recent immigrants
India	139,655	23.9%
China	54,645	9.3%
Philippines	45,235	7.7%
Syria	30,180	5.2%
Pakistan	23,970	4.1%
United States	17,940	3.1%
Nigeria	16,575	2.8%
Iran	13,215	2.3%
Iraq	12,940	2.2%
Jamaica	9,975	1.7%
Brazil	8,720	1.5%
United Kingdom	8,000	1.4%
Bangladesh	7,710	1.3%
Afghanistan	7,225	1.2%
Eritrea	7,145	1.2%
Turkey	7,060	1.2%
South Korea	6,935	1.2%
Egypt	6,370	1.1%
Saudi Arabia	6,110	1%
Ukraine	6,040	1%
Vietnam	6,020	1%
Sri Lanka	5,895	1%
Mexico	5,805	1%
United Arab Emirates	5,305	0.9%
Russia	5,150	0.9%
Total recent immigrants	584,680	100%

=== Interprovincial migration ===
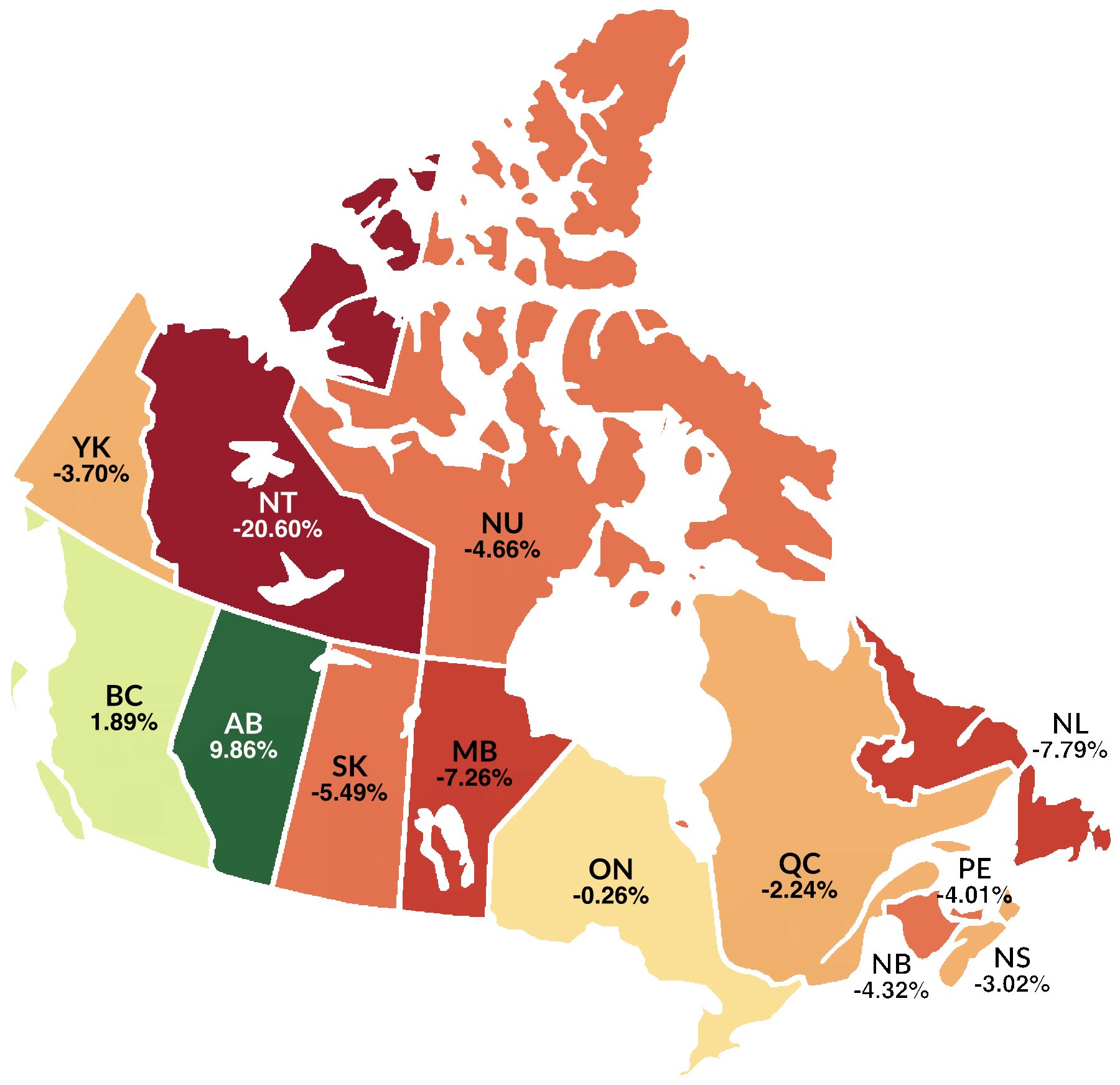
Net cumulative interprovincial migration per Province from 1997 to 2017, as a share of population of each Provinces

Ontario's interprovincial migration rate have shifted over the years. It was negative in the 1970s, positive in the 1980s, but then negative again in the 1990s. It went back to the positive in around the time of the turn of the millennium for a few years, but has been in the negatives constantly from 2003 to 2015, and has been in the positives since then. Over the period from 1971 to 2015, Ontario was the province which experience the second lowest levels of interprovincial in-migration and out-migration, second only to Quebec.

Interprovincial migration in Ontario
	In-migrants	Out-migrants	Net migration
2008–09	57,458	73,059	−15,601
2009–10	59,741	64,403	−4,662
2010–11	58,317	62,324	−4,007
2011–12	60,459	71,070	−10,611
2012–13	54,678	68,579	−13,901
2013–14	57,415	71,979	−14,564
2014–15	62,874	71,569	−8,695
2015–16	71,790	62,713	9,077
2016–17	71,717	58,335	13,382
2017–18	69,918	59,974	9,944
2018–19	77,281	65,550	11,731
2019–20	97,031	89,210	7,821

Source: Statistics Canada

== See also ==
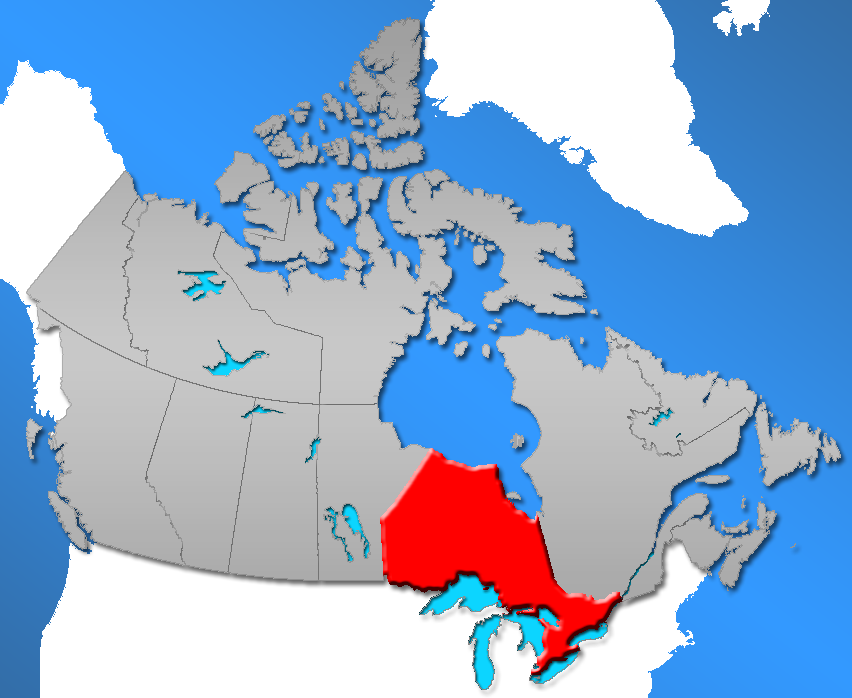
Demographics of Canada's provinces and territories
- Demographics of Canada
- List of municipalities in Ontario
- List of census divisions of Ontario
- Population of Canada by province and territory
