= Ecoregions of Canada =

Ecoregions of Canada may refer to:

- Ecozones of Canada, Environment and Climate Change Canada system
- List of ecoregions in Canada (WWF), World Wildlife Fund system
