= 1991 Canadian census =

Canadian census

- June 4, 1991

General information
- Country: Canada

Results
- Total population: 27,296,859 (▲7.9%)
- Most populous province/territory: Ontario (10,084,885)
- Least populous province/territory: Yukon (27,797)

The 1991 Canadian census was a detailed enumeration of the Canadian population. Census day was June 4, 1991. On that day, Statistics Canada attempted to count every person in Canada. The total population count of Canada was 27,296,859. This was a 7.9% increase over the 1986 census of 25,309,331.

The previous census was the 1986 census and the following census was in 1996 census.

== Canada by the numbers ==
A summary of information about Canada.

Total population	27,296,859
Dwellings	10,018,270
Men	13,454,580
Women	13,842,280
Average earnings	$24,329

== Population by province ==
Rank	Province or territory	Population as of 1991 census	Population as of 1986 census	Change	Percent change
1	Ontario	10,084,885	9,101,694	983,191 ▲	10.8 ▲
2	Quebec	6,895,963	6,532,461	363,502 ▲	5.6 ▲
3	British Columbia	3,282,061	2,883,367	398,694 ▲	13.8 ▲
4	Alberta	2,545,553	2,365,825	179,728 ▲	7.6 ▲
5	Manitoba	1,091,942	1,063,016	28,926 ▲	2.7 ▲
6	Saskatchewan	988,928	1,009,613	-20,685 ▼	-2.0 ▼
7	Nova Scotia	899,942	873,176	26,766 ▲	3.1 ▲
8	New Brunswick	723,900	709,442	14,458 ▲	2.0 ▲
9	Newfoundland and Labrador	568,474	568,349	125 ▲	0.0 ▲
10	Prince Edward Island	129,765	126,646	3,119 ▲	2.5 ▲
11	Northwest Territories	57,649	52,238	5,411 ▲	10.4 ▲
12	Yukon	27,797	23,504	4,293 ▲	18.3 ▲
	Canada	27,296,859	25,309,331	1,987,528 ▲	7.9 ▲

== See also ==
- Population and housing censuses by country
