= Demographics of Alberta =

Population density of Alberta, 2016

Alberta has experienced a relatively high rate of growth in recent years, due in large part to its economy. Between 2003 and 2004, the province saw high birthrates (on par with some larger provinces such as British Columbia), relatively high immigration, and a high rate of interprovincial migration when compared to other provinces. Approximately 81% of the population live in urban areas and only about 19% live in rural areas. The Calgary–Edmonton Corridor is the most urbanized area in Alberta and is one of Canada's four most urban regions. Many of Alberta's cities and towns have also experienced high rates of growth in recent history. From a population of 73,022 in 1901, Alberta has grown to 4,262,635 in 2021 and in the process has gone from less than 1.5% of Canada's population to 11.5%. It is the fourth most populated province in Canada. Between the 2016 and 2021 censuses, the Alberta population grew by 4.8%.

== Population history ==
View chart definition.

Year	Population	Five-year % change	Ten-year % change	Percentage of Canadian pop.	Rank among provinces
1901	73,022†	n/a	n/a	1.4	9
1911	374,295	n/a	412.6	5.2	7
1921	588,454	n/a	57.2	6.7	5
1931	731,605	n/a	24.3	7.0	4
1941	796,169	n/a	8.8	6.9	5
1951	939,501	n/a	18.0	6.7	4
1956	1,123,116	19.5	n/a	n/a	4
1961	1,331,944	18.6	41.8	7.3	4
1969	1,463,203	9.9	30.3	n/a	4
1971	1,627,875	11.3	22.2	7.5	4
1976	1,838,035	12.9	25.6	n/a	4
1981	2,237,724	21.7	37.5	9.2	4
1986	2,365,830	5.7	28.7	9.3	4
1991	2,545,553	7.6	13.8	9.3	4
1996	2,696,826	5.9	14.0	9.3	4
2001	2,974,807	10.3	16.9	9.9	4
2006	3,290,350	10.6	22.0	10.4	4
2011	3,645,257	10.8	22.5	10.9	4
2016	4,067,175	11.6	23.6	11.6	4
2021	4,262,635	4.8	16.9	11.5	4

† 1901 population for District of Alberta, part of the then-named North-West Territories.

== Population geography ==
=== Census divisions ===
Alberta's census divisions by population

=== Census metropolitan areas ===
As of the 2011 census, Alberta had two census metropolitan areas (CMAs) recognized by Statistics Canada. A third one was added in the 2016 census.

The following is a list of the recent population history of the Calgary and Edmonton CMAs.

CMA name	2021	2016	2011	2006	2001	1996	Census division
Calgary	1,481,806	1,374,655	1,214,839	1,079,310	951,395 (Note: In the 2006 census, the 2001 population of the Calgary was adjusted to 951,494 due to a boundary expansion.)	821,628	Division No. 6
Edmonton	1,418,118	1,297,280	1,159,869	1,034,945	937,845	862,597	Division No. 11

The third CMA added in 2016 is Lethbridge, and its population history is as follows:

CMA name	2021	2016	Census division
Lethbridge	123,847	113,920	Division No. 2

The fourth CMA added in 2021 is Red Deer, and its population history is as follows:

CMA name	2021	Census division
Red Deer	100,844	Division No. 8

CMA notes:

=== Census subdivisions ===
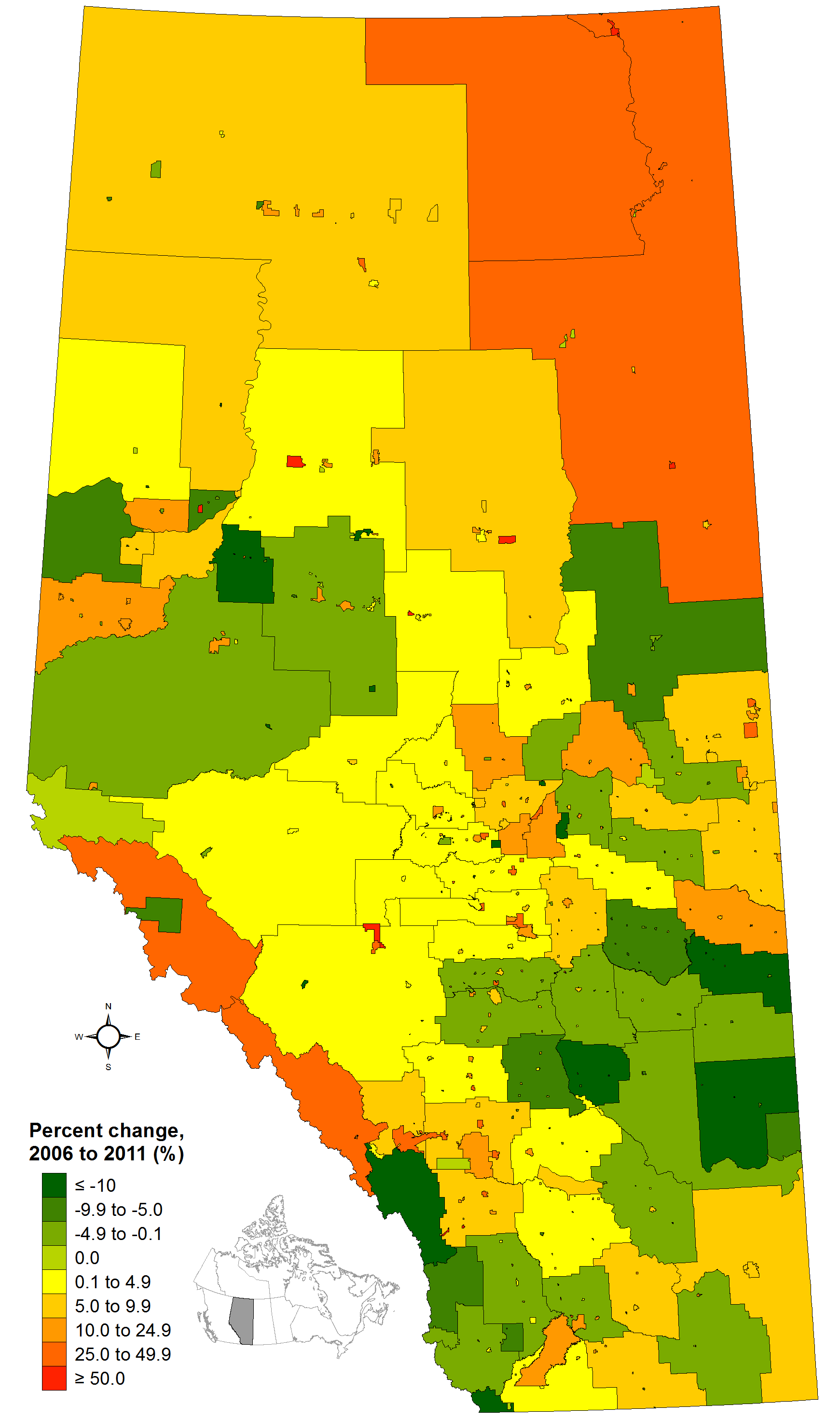
Population growth of Alberta's census subdivisions between 2006 and 2011 censuses

As of the 2006 census, Alberta had 453 census subdivisions (municipalities and municipal equivalents) recognized by Statistics Canada. The following is a list of those census subdivisions with a population of 10,000 or greater.

Name	Municipal status	2011	2006	2001	1996	Notes
Calgary	City	1,096,833	988,193	878,866	768,082	
Edmonton	City	812,201	730,372	666,104	616,306	
Strathcona County	Specialized municipality	92,490	82,511	71,986	64,176	Located within the Edmonton CMA
Red Deer	City	90,564	82,772	67,707	60,075	
Lethbridge	City	83,517	74,637	67,374	63,053	
Wood Buffalo	Specialized municipality	65,565	51,496	41,466	35,213	
St. Albert	City	61,466	57,719	53,081	46,888	Located within the Edmonton CMA
Medicine Hat	City	60,005	56,997	51,249	46,783	
Grande Prairie	City	55,032	47,076	36,983	31,140	
Airdrie	City	42,564	28,927	20,382	15,946	Located within the Calgary CMA
Rocky View County	Municipal district	36,461	34,171	30,688	23,326	Located within the Calgary CMA
Parkland County	Municipal district	30,568	29,265	27,252	24,769	Located within the Edmonton CMA
Spruce Grove	City	26,171	19,496	15,983	14,271	Located within the Edmonton CMA
Okotoks	Town	24,511	17,145	11,664	8,510	
Leduc	City	24,279	16,967	15,032	14,305	Located within the Edmonton CMA
Foothills No. 31	Municipal district	21,258	19,736	16,764	13,714	
County of Grande Prairie No. 1	Municipal district	20,347	17,970	15,638	13,750	
Sturgeon County	Municipal district	19,578	18,621	18,067	15,945	Located within the Edmonton CMA
Fort Saskatchewan	City	19,051	14,957	13,121	12,408	Located within the Edmonton CMA
Red Deer County	Municipal district	18,351	19,108	18,639	17,126	
Lloydminster	City	18,032	15,910	13,148	11,317	Population totals do not include the part of the city located within Saskatchewan
Cochrane	Town	17,580	13,780	11,798	7,424	Located within Calgary CMA
Camrose	City	17,286	15,620	14,854	13,728	
Stony Plain	Town	15,051	12,363	9,589	8,274	Located within the Edmonton CMA
Chestermere	Town	14,824	9,564	3,414	1,911	
Beaumont	Town	13,284	8,961	7,006	5,810	Located within the Edmonton CMA
Cold Lake	City	13,839	11,991	11,520	4,089	
Brooks	City	13,676	12,498	11,604	10,093	
Leduc County	Municipal district	13,541	12,730	12,528	12,361	Located within the Edmonton CMA
High River	Town	12,920	10,716	9,345	7,359	
Wetaskiwin	City	12,525	11,673	11,154	10,959	
Mountain View County	Municipal district	12,359	12,391	12,134	11,277	
Sylvan Lake	Town	12,327	10,208	7,493	5,178	
Strathmore	Town	12,305	10,225	7,621	5,282	
Canmore	Town	12,288	12,039	10,792	8,354	
Clearwater County	Municipal district	12,278	11,826	11,505	10,915	
Lacombe	City	11,707	10,742	9,384	8,018	
Yellowhead County	Municipal district	11,469	10,045	9,881	9,352	
Bonnyville No. 87	Municipal district	11,191	10,194	9,473	17,352	
Mackenzie County	Specialized municipality	10,927	10,002	8,829	7,980	
County of Wetaskiwin No. 10	Municipal district	10,866	10,535	10,695	10,467	
Lacombe County	Municipal district	10,312	10,451	10,159	10,081	
Lethbridge County	Municipal district	10,061	10,302	9,930	9,290	

== Vital statistics ==
Life expectancy in the province in 2019 was 82.0 years (79.9 for male, 84.1 for female)

== Ethnic origins ==
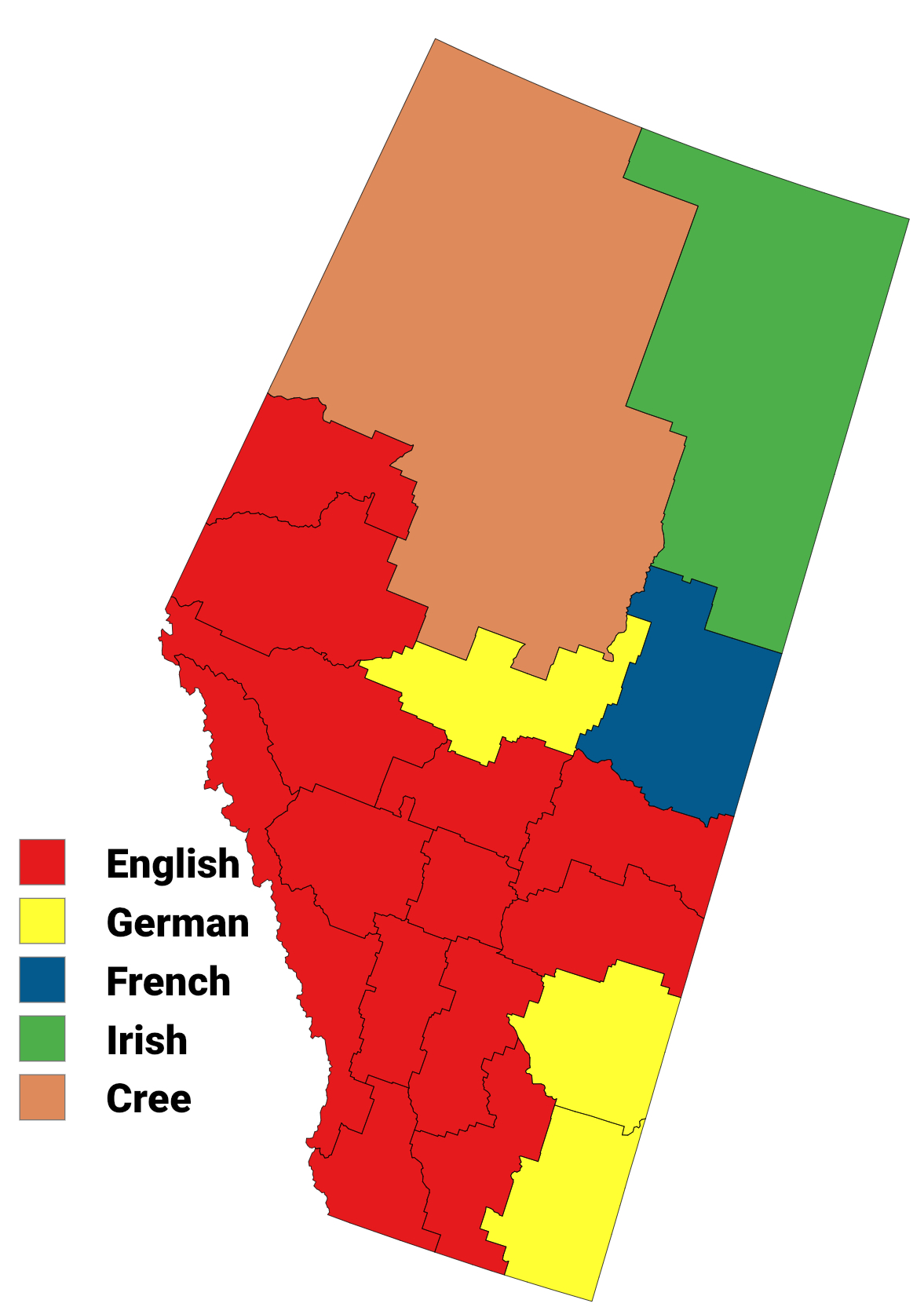
Largest ethnic origins by census division, 2021 census

The ethnicities most commonly reported in the 2021 Census are shown in the table below. The percentages add up to more than 100% because of multiple responses.

Ethnic groups in Alberta (1941–2021)
Ethnic group	2021		2001		1941	
Ethnic group	Pop.	%	Pop.	%	Pop.	%
English	766,070	18.34%	753,190	25.61%	191,934	24.11%
German	641,025	15.34%	576,350	19.6%	77,721	9.76%
Scottish	631,015	15.1%	556,575	18.92%	112,540	14.14%
Irish	561,915	13.45%	461,065	15.68%	83,876	10.53%
Canadian	484,655	11.6%	813,485	27.66%	—N/a	—N/a
Ukrainian	343,640	8.23%	285,725	9.71%	71,868	9.03%
French	341,755	8.18%	333,705	11.35%	42,979	5.4%
Filipino	203,955	4.88%	36,235	1.23%	—N/a	—N/a
First Nations	188,315	4.51%	144,040	4.9%	12,565	1.58%
Chinese	177,990	4.26%	108,050	3.67%	3,122	0.39%
Dutch	174,625	4.18%	149,225	5.07%	20,429	2.57%
Polish	169,925	4.07%	137,625	4.68%	26,845	3.37%
Indian	155,700	3.73%	61,180	2.08%	48	0.01%
Norwegian	154,535	3.7%	120,045	4.08%	29,628	3.72%
Métis	115,455	2.76%	63,620	2.16%	8,808	1.11%
Italian	98,730	2.36%	67,655	2.3%	4,872	0.61%
Russian	97,890	2.34%	62,750	2.13%	19,316	2.43%
Swedish	92,970	2.23%	78,565	2.67%	20,505	2.58%
Welsh	76,810	1.84%	59,470	2.02%	10,896	1.37%
Danish	56,190	1.34%	50,465	1.72%	12,284	1.54%
Hungarian	51,360	1.23%	41,535	1.41%	7,892	0.99%
Spanish	40,170	0.96%	19,295	0.66%	135	0.02%
Pakistani	39,535	0.95%	5,450	0.19%	—N/a	—N/a
Vietnamese	39,395	0.94%	21,490	0.73%	—N/a	—N/a
Punjabi	37,585	0.9%	3,785	0.13%	—N/a	—N/a
Austrian	36,220	0.87%	27,910	0.95%	7,513	0.94%
African	34,225	0.82%	7,115	0.24%	926	0.12%
Mennonite	31,565	0.76%	—N/a	—N/a	—N/a	—N/a
Romanian	31,530	0.75%	20,235	0.69%	4,206	0.53%
Sikh	28,860	0.69%	—N/a	—N/a	—N/a	—N/a
Lebanese	28,480	0.68%	17,660	0.6%	—N/a (Note: Included under Syrian)	—N/a
Mexican	25,450	0.61%	3,345	0.11%	1	0%
Korean	24,165	0.58%	7,925	0.27%	—N/a	—N/a
Swiss	22,450	0.54%	17,460	0.59%	—N/a	—N/a
Belgian	21,985	0.53%	14,925	0.51%	2,919	0.37%
Portuguese	21,415	0.51%	13,885	0.47%	42	0.01%
Hindu	20,535	0.49%	—N/a	—N/a	—N/a	—N/a
Czech	19,730	0.47%	15,765	0.54%	8,177 (Note: Including Slovak)	1.03%
Icelandic	19,720	0.47%	13,065	0.44%	1,077	0.14%
Finnish	18,705	0.45%	12,730	0.43%	3,452	0.43%
Japanese	18,605	0.45%	11,945	0.41%	578	0.07%
Somali	16,310	0.39%	1,385	0.05%	—N/a	—N/a
Jamaican	15,620	0.37%	7,925	0.27%	—N/a	—N/a
Nigerian	14,600	0.35%	1,245	0.04%	—N/a	—N/a
Jewish	14,405	0.34%	15,435	0.52%	4,164	0.52%
Greek	13,980	0.33%	9,110	0.31%	605	0.08%
Croatian	13,720	0.33%	8,565	0.29%	1,704 (Note: Including all Yugoslavic ethnic groups)	0.21%
Ethiopian	13,505	0.32%	1,460	0.05%	—N/a	—N/a
Muslim	12,420	0.3%	—N/a	—N/a	—N/a	—N/a
Colombian	11,115	0.27%	950	0.03%	—N/a	—N/a
Eritrean	11,010	0.26%	1,180	0.04%	—N/a	—N/a
Iranian	10,545	0.25%	3,130	0.11%	—N/a	—N/a
Slovak	10,525	0.25%	6,810	0.23%	—N/a (Note: Included under Czech)	—N/a
Afghan	10,380	0.25%	1,805	0.06%	—N/a	—N/a
Egyptian	9,585	0.23%	2,290	0.08%	—N/a	—N/a
Syrian	9,520	0.23%	1,265	0.04%	428 (Note: Including Lebanese)	0.05%
Total responses	4,177,720	98.01%	2,941,150	98.87%	796,169	100%
Total population	4,262,635	100%	2,974,807	100%	796,169	100%
Note: Totals greater than 100% due to multiple origin responses

=== Future projections ===
Panethnic origin projections in Alberta (2031–2041)
Panethnic group	2031		2036		2041	
Panethnic group	Pop.	%	Pop.	%	Pop.	%
European (Note: Statistic includes all persons that did not make up part of a visible minority or an Indigenous identity.)	3,122,000	56.6%	3,178,000	52.89%	3,219,000	49.6%
South Asian	533,000	9.66%	649,000	10.8%	763,000	11.76%
Southeast Asian (Note: Statistic includes total responses of "Filipino" and "Southeast Asian" under visible minority section on census.)	441,000	7.99%	528,000	8.79%	619,000	9.54%
Indigenous	404,000	7.32%	442,000	7.36%	480,000	7.4%
African	331,000	6%	406,000	6.76%	480,000	7.4%
East Asian (Note: Statistic includes total responses of "Chinese", "Korean", and "Japanese" under visible minority section on census.)	311,000	5.64%	352,000	5.86%	392,000	6.04%
Middle Eastern (Note: Statistic includes total responses of "West Asian" and "Arab" under visible minority section on census.)	188,000	3.41%	233,000	3.88%	280,000	4.31%
Latin American	107,000	1.94%	126,000	2.1%	144,000	2.22%
Other/multiracial (Note: Statistic includes total responses of "Visible minority, n.i.e." and "Multiple visible minorities" under visible minority section on census.)	78,000	1.41%	95,000	1.58%	112,000	1.73%
Projected Alberta population	5,516,000	100%	6,009,000	100%	6,490,000	100%

== Visible minorities and Indigenous peoples ==
Indigenous and visible minority identity (2021):
1. European Canadian (65.4%)
2. Visible minority (27.8%)
3. First Nations (3.50%)
4. Métis (3.10%)
5. Inuit (0.10%)
6. Other Indigenous (0.20%)

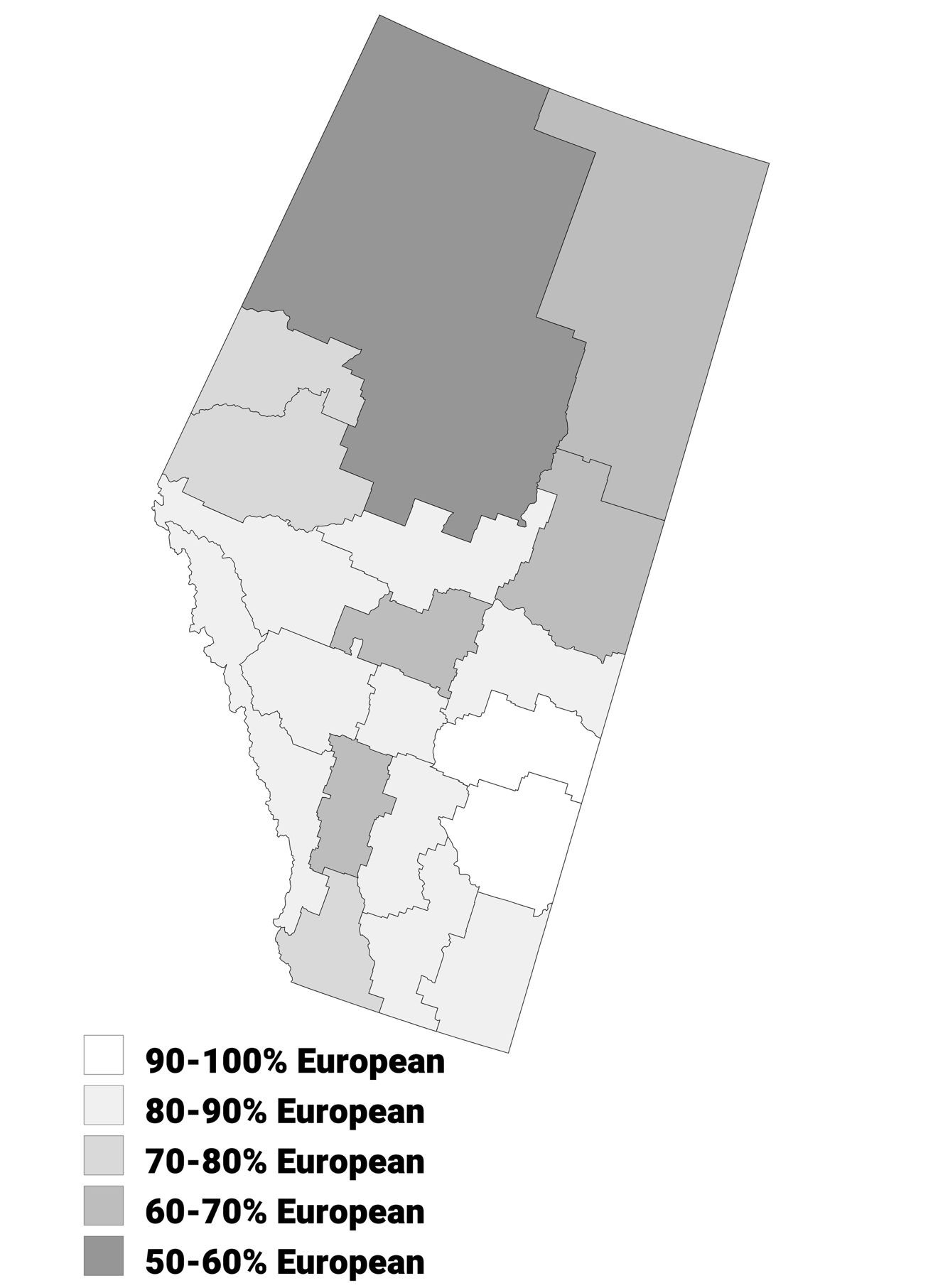
Largest panethnic groups in Alberta by percentage of total population by census division, 2021 census

Visible minority & Indigenous population in Alberta (1986–2021)
Group	Population	2021 census		2016 census		2011 census		2006 census		2001 census		1996 census		1991 census		1986 census	
Group	Population	Pop.	%	Pop.	%	Pop.	%	Pop.	%	Pop.	%	Pop.	%	Pop.	%	Pop.	%
Non-Indigenous / non-visible minority group	British Isles (Note: Including multiple responses.) (Note: 1996-present census populations for British Isles and French origins may be undercounts, due to the creation of the "Canadian" ethnic origin category. All citizens of Canada are classified as "Canadians" as defined by Canada's nationality laws. However, "Canadian" as an ethnic group has since 1996 been added to census questionnaires for possible ancestry. "Canadian" was included as an example on the English questionnaire and "Canadien" as an example on the French questionnaire. "The majority of respondents to this selection are from the eastern part of the country that was first settled. Respondents generally are visibly European (Anglophones and Francophones), however no-longer self identify with their ethnic ancestral origins. This response is attributed to a multitude or generational distance from ancestral lineage. Source 1: Jack Jedwab (April 2008). "Our 'Cense' of Self: the 2006 Census saw 1.6 million 'Canadian' Canadians Return to British and French origins" (PDF). Association for Canadian Studies. p. 2. Archived from the original (PDF) on October 2, 2011. "Virtually all persons who reported "Canadian" in 1996 had English or French as a mother tongue, were born in Canada and had both parents born inside Canada. This suggests that many of these respondents were people whose families have been in this country for several generations. In effect the "new Canadians" were persons that previously reported either British or French origins. Moreover in 1996 some 55% of people with both parents born in Canada reported Canadian (alone or in combination with other origins). By contrast, only 4% of people with both parents born outside Canada reported Canadian. Thus the Canadian response did not appeal widely to either immigrants or their children. Most important however was that nearly half of those persons reporting Canadian origin in 1996 were in Quebec this represented a majority of the mother tongue francophone population[...]In the 2001 Census, 11.7 million people, or 39% of the total population, reported Canadian as their ethnic origin, either alone or in combination with other origins. Some 4.9 million Quebecers out of 7.1 million individuals reported Canadian or "Canadien" thus accounting for nearly seven in ten persons (nearly eighty percent of francophones in Quebec)." Source 2: Don Kerr (2007). The Changing Face of Canada: Essential Readings in Population. Canadian Scholars' Press. pp. 313–317. ISBN 978-1-55130-322-2. Source 3: Jantzen (2006) Footnote 5: Note that Canadian and Canadien have been separated since the two terms mean different things. In English, it usually means someone whose family has been in Canada for multiple generations. In French it is referring to "Les Habitants", settlers of New France during the 17th and 18th centuries who earned their living primarily from agricultural labour. Source 4: Jantzen (2006): The reporting of French New World ancestries (Canadien, Québécois, and French-Canadian) is concentrated in the 4th+ generations; 79% of French-Canadian, 88% of Canadien and 90% of Québécois are in the 4th+generations category. Source 5: Jantzen (2005): According to Table 3, the 4th+ generations are highest because of a strong sense of belonging to their ethnic or cultural group among those respondents reporting the New World ancestries of Canadien and Québécois. Source 6: Jantzen (2006): For respondents of French and New World ancestries the pattern is different. Where generational data is available, it is possible to see that not all respondents reporting these ancestries report a high sense of belonging to their ethnic or cultural group. The high proportions are focused among those respondents that are in the 4th+ generations, and unlike with the British Isles example, the difference between the 2nd and 3rd generations to the 4th+ generation is more pronounced. Since these ancestries are concentrated in the 4th+ generations, their high proportions of sense of belonging to ethnic or cultural group push up the 4th+ generational results.)	1,497,305	35.84%	1,581,265	39.75%	1,537,660	43.1%	1,488,090	45.7%	1,267,540	43.1%	1,198,160	44.89%	1,340,715	53.22%	1,372,495	58.65%
Non-Indigenous / non-visible minority group	Western European	867,440	20.76%	915,185	23.01%	876,045	24.55%	862,460	26.49%	733,625	24.94%	674,445	25.27%	684,725	27.18%	611,415	26.13%
Non-Indigenous / non-visible minority group	Eastern European	620,865	14.86%	685,270	17.23%	638,385	17.89%	609,840	18.73%	507,055	17.24%	455,330	17.06%	433,670	17.21%	379,070	16.2%
Non-Indigenous / non-visible minority group	French	390,010	9.34%	418,480	10.52%	402,070	11.27%	390,895	12%	334,045	11.36%	307,285	11.51%	319,040	12.66%	296,020	12.65%
Non-Indigenous / non-visible minority group	Northern European	337,145	8.07%	329,990	8.3%	321,845	9.02%	308,445	9.47%	257,650	8.76%	231,495	8.67%	202,120	8.02%	176,825	7.56%
Non-Indigenous / non-visible minority group	Southern European	241,125	5.77%	215,730	5.42%	182,525	5.12%	168,650	5.18%	132,075	4.49%	112,310	4.21%	107,010	4.25%	88,690	3.79%
Non-Indigenous / non-visible minority group	European, n.i.e. & n.o.s.	77,815	1.86%	22,810	0.57%	24,670	0.69%	21,050	0.65%	19,550	0.66%	17,585	0.66%	19,055	0.76%	15,105	0.65%
Total non-Indigenous / non-visible minority population (Note: Single responses only unless otherwise specified.)		2,731,825	65.39%	2,786,340	70.04%	2,690,950	75.42%	2,613,790	80.27%	2,455,005	83.47%	2,279,335	85.39%	2,133,355	84.68%	2,069,665	88.44%
Visible minority (Note: Statistics Canada defines visible minorities as defined in the Employment Equity Act which defines visible minorities as "persons, other than Aboriginal peoples, who are non-Caucasian in race or non-white in colour".) group	South Asian	297,650	7.12%	230,930	5.8%	156,660	4.39%	103,885	3.19%	69,585	2.37%	52,565	1.97%	47,295	1.88%	33,610	1.44%
Visible minority group	Filipino	216,710	5.19%	166,195	4.18%	106,030	2.97%	51,090	1.57%	33,940	1.15%	24,380	0.91%	17,575	0.7%	11,235	0.48%
Visible minority group	Black	177,945	4.26%	129,395	3.25%	74,435	2.09%	47,075	1.45%	31,390	1.07%	24,915	0.93%	25,025	0.99%	19,495	0.83%
Visible minority group	Chinese	164,230	3.93%	158,205	3.98%	133,390	3.74%	120,270	3.69%	99,095	3.37%	90,480	3.39%	76,950	3.05%	53,595	2.29%
Visible minority group	Arab	69,510	1.66%	56,700	1.43%	34,920	0.98%	26,180	0.8%	19,320	0.66%	—N/a	—N/a	—N/a	—N/a	—N/a	—N/a
Visible minority group	Latin American	66,515	1.59%	55,085	1.38%	41,305	1.16%	27,265	0.84%	18,745	0.64%	15,770	0.59%	11,165	0.44%	5,060	0.22%
Visible minority group	Southeast Asian	54,005	1.29%	43,985	1.11%	41,025	1.15%	28,605	0.88%	23,740	0.81%	20,295	0.76%	18,585	0.74%	13,065	0.56%
Visible minority group	Multiple visible minorities	39,745	0.95%	28,360	0.71%	18,840	0.53%	13,250	0.41%	6,910	0.23%	6,480	0.24%	5,420	0.22%	4,640	0.2%
Visible minority group	West Asian	25,080	0.6%	20,980	0.53%	16,025	0.45%	9,655	0.3%	5,230	0.18%	—N/a	—N/a	—N/a	—N/a	—N/a	—N/a
Visible minority group	Korean	24,370	0.58%	21,275	0.53%	15,000	0.42%	12,045	0.37%	7,800	0.27%	4,705	0.18%	4,125	0.16%	3,585	0.15%
Visible minority group	Japanese	13,555	0.32%	12,170	0.31%	12,420	0.35%	11,030	0.34%	9,950	0.34%	8,280	0.31%	8,585	0.34%	7,665	0.33%
Visible minority group	Visible minority, n.i.e.	12,105	0.29%	9,905	0.25%	6,270	0.18%	3,850	0.12%	4,220	0.14%	3,575	0.13%	675	0.03%	1,095	0.05%
Visible minority group	Arab/West Asian	—N/a	—N/a	—N/a	—N/a	—N/a	—N/a	—N/a	—N/a	—N/a	—N/a	17,830	0.67%	20,575	0.82%	13,625	0.58%
Total visible minority population		1,161,420	27.8%	933,165	23.46%	656,330	18.4%	454,200	13.95%	329,925	11.22%	269,280	10.09%	235,975	9.37%	166,670	7.12%
Indigenous (Note: Statistics Canada defines Indigenous identity as persons who identify with the Indigenous Peoples of Canada.) group	First Nations	145,640	3.49%	136,585	3.43%	116,675	3.27%	97,280	2.99%	84,990	2.89%	69,145	2.59%	99,655 (Note: Including multiple Indigenous responses.)	3.96%	62,990	2.69%
Indigenous group	Métis	127,470	3.05%	114,375	2.88%	96,870	2.71%	85,495	2.63%	66,060	2.25%	49,490	1.85%	56,310	2.24%	34,165	1.46%
Indigenous group	Multiple Indigenous responses	4,780	0.11%	2,905	0.07%	1,870	0.05%	1,220	0.04%	1,100	0.04%	1,325	0.05%	—N/a	—N/a	6,045	0.26%
Indigenous group	Indigenous responses, n.i.e.	3,620	0.09%	2,275	0.06%	3,300	0.09%	2,760	0.08%	2,980	0.1%	—N/a	—N/a	—N/a	—N/a	—N/a	—N/a
Indigenous group	Inuk (Inuit)	2,950	0.07%	2,500	0.06%	1,985	0.06%	1,605	0.05%	1,090	0.04%	615	0.02%	2,820	0.11%	760	0.03%
Total Indigenous population		284,470	6.81%	258,640	6.5%	220,695	6.19%	188,365	5.78%	156,220	5.31%	120,580	4.52%	149,855	5.95%	103,930	4.44%
Total responses		4,177,715	98.01%	3,978,145	97.81%	3,567,975	97.88%	3,256,355	98.97%	2,941,150	98.87%	2,669,195	98.98%	2,519,185	98.96%	2,340,265	98.92%
Total population		4,262,635	100%	4,067,175	100%	3,645,257	100%	3,290,350	100%	2,974,807	100%	2,696,826	100%	2,545,553	100%	2,365,825	100%

== Languages ==
=== Knowledge of languages ===
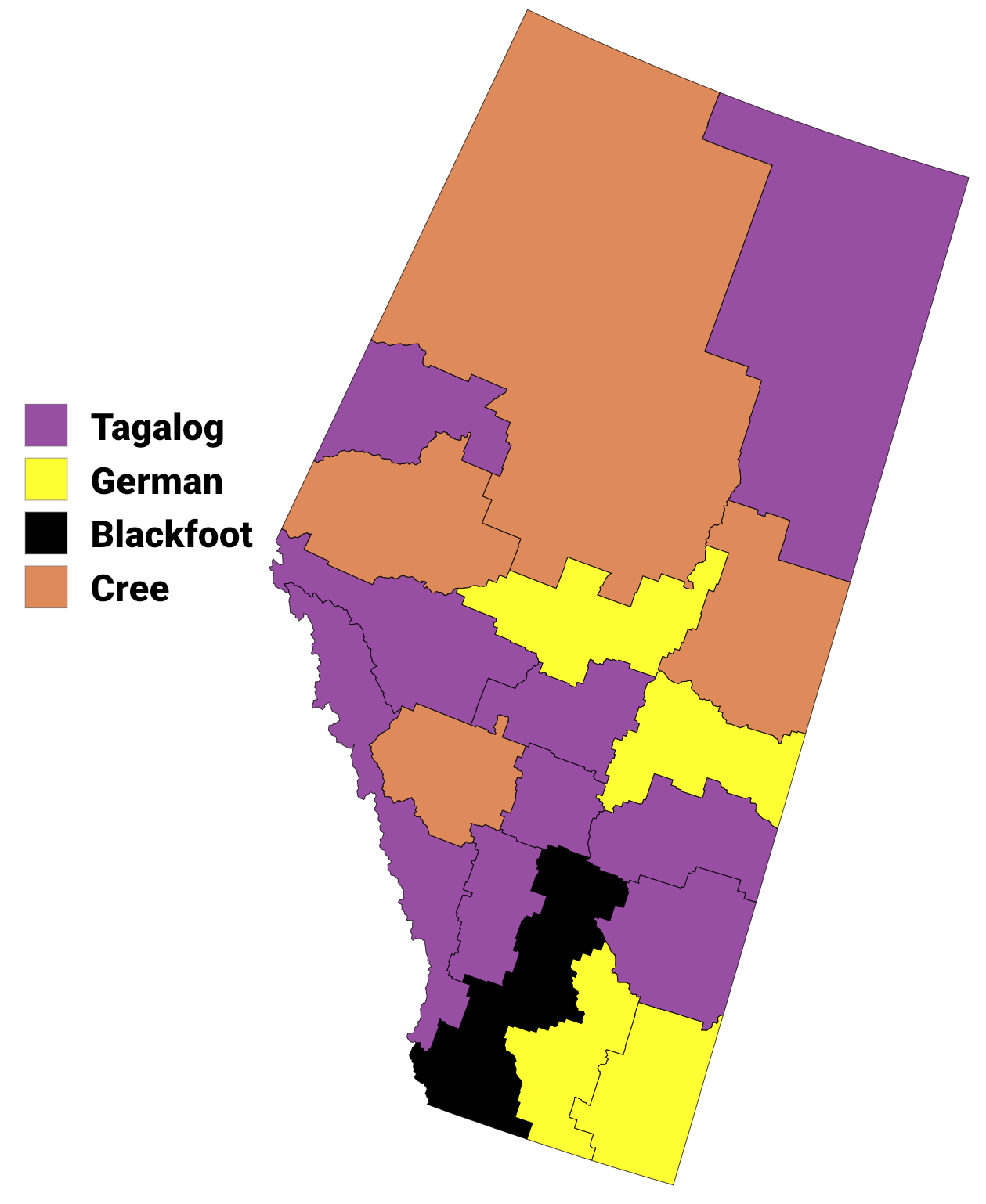
Largest non-official language known in Alberta by census division, 2021 census

Top languages known in Alberta 2021 census (Note: The question on knowledge of languages allows for multiple responses. The following figures are from the 2021 Canadian census.)
Language	Percent
English	98.37%
French	6.23%
Tagalog	4.13%
Chinese (Note: Including total responses to all Chinese languages and dialects.)	3.39%
Punjabi	3.03%
Spanish	2.78%
Hindi (Note: Note: Hindi and Urdu form mutually intelligible registers of the Hindustani language.)	2.25%
Arabic	1.84%
German (Note: Including total responses to all High German languages.)	1.59%
Urdu	1.23%

The question on knowledge of languages allows for multiple responses, and first appeared on the 1991 Canadian census. (Note: The 1991 Census was the first to ask Canadians whether they could conduct a conversation in a language other than English or French.)

Knowledge of Languages in Alberta (1991–2021)
Language	2021 Canadian census		2016 Canadian census		2011 Canadian census		2006 Canadian census		2001 Canadian census		1996 Canadian census		1991 Canadian census	
Language	Pop.	%	Pop.	%	Pop.	%	Pop.	%	Pop.	%	Pop.	%	Pop.	%
English	4,109,725	98.37%	3,916,805	98.46%	3,557,375	98.54%	3,213,690	98.69%	2,907,805	98.87%	2,633,580	98.67%	2,486,090	98.69%
French	260,415	6.23%	264,600	6.65%	238,770	6.61%	225,085	6.91%	204,800	6.96%	180,125	6.75%	169,095	6.71%
Tagalog	172,625	4.13%	138,440	3.48%	87,385	2.42%	40,095	1.23%	26,310	0.89%	19,025	0.71%	13,470	0.53%
Chinese	141,465	3.39%	139,385	3.5%	125,375	3.47%	116,505	3.58%	94,955	3.23%	83,020	3.11%	68,210	2.71%
Punjabi	126,385	3.03%	90,485	2.27%	62,815	1.74%	44,480	1.37%	28,460	0.97%	20,665	0.77%	15,165	0.6%
Spanish	116,070	2.78%	104,445	2.63%	81,350	2.25%	61,335	1.88%	44,340	1.51%	34,515	1.29%	28,590	1.13%
Hindi	94,015	2.25%	61,290	1.54%	40,745	1.13%	28,800	0.88%	21,500	0.73%	14,850	0.56%	12,185	0.48%
Arabic	76,760	1.84%	62,730	1.58%	40,920	1.13%	30,235	0.93%	22,625	0.77%	16,515	0.62%	13,255	0.53%
German	66,510	1.59%	85,375	2.15%	83,945	2.33%	108,950	3.35%	102,810	3.5%	101,135	3.79%	105,495	4.19%
Urdu	51,545	1.23%	41,235	1.04%	26,820	0.74%	17,690	0.54%	10,365	0.35%	5,890	0.22%	5,260	0.21%
Vietnamese	33,025	0.79%	30,150	0.76%	29,200	0.81%	26,020	0.8%	23,700	0.81%	21,705	0.81%	19,120	0.76%
Russian	29,755	0.71%	27,375	0.69%	20,640	0.57%	15,770	0.48%	12,790	0.43%	10,060	0.38%	7,900	0.31%
Gujarati	24,780	0.59%	18,005	0.45%	11,875	0.33%	9,170	0.28%	8,685	0.3%	8,025	0.3%	8,545	0.34%
Ukrainian	23,340	0.56%	26,600	0.67%	31,845	0.88%	38,165	1.17%	45,410	1.54%	49,870	1.87%	59,135	2.35%
Korean	23,030	0.55%	19,950	0.5%	13,930	0.39%	11,580	0.36%	7,275	0.25%	4,345	0.16%	3,645	0.14%
Polish	22,385	0.54%	23,650	0.59%	21,900	0.61%	24,980	0.77%	24,605	0.84%	25,705	0.96%	24,710	0.98%
Cree (Note: Including total responses to all Cree–Innu language dialects.)	22,005	0.53%	23,465	0.59%	22,780	0.63%	24,205	0.74%	22,975	0.78%	22,015	0.82%	20,980	0.83%
Persian (Note: Including total responses to all Persian Language dialects.)	20,935	0.5%	17,600	0.44%	12,660	0.35%	8,760	0.27%	4,580	0.16%	2,465	0.09%	2,095	0.08%
Italian	19,480	0.47%	19,900	0.5%	19,380	0.54%	20,585	0.63%	21,320	0.72%	20,665	0.77%	21,640	0.86%
Dutch	17,170	0.41%	19,480	0.49%	21,190	0.59%	23,130	0.71%	23,760	0.81%	23,290	0.87%	25,005	0.99%
Portuguese	14,650	0.35%	12,670	0.32%	9,745	0.27%	9,710	0.3%	8,440	0.29%	7,160	0.27%	7,445	0.3%
Serbo-Croatian	13,855	0.33%	15,610	0.39%	11,595	0.32%	12,675	0.39%	11,925	0.41%	8,025	0.3%	3,410	0.14%
Japanese	10,925	0.26%	9,215	0.23%	8,650	0.24%	8,120	0.25%	6,810	0.23%	5,685	0.21%	4,835	0.19%
Tamil	10,105	0.24%	7,195	0.18%	3,995	0.11%	1,940	0.06%	1,630	0.06%	1,255	0.05%	940	0.04%
Romanian	9,765	0.23%	9,915	0.25%	7,310	0.2%	5,070	0.16%	3,570	0.12%	2,255	0.08%	2,125	0.08%
Hungarian	6,700	0.16%	7,660	0.19%	7,465	0.21%	7,680	0.24%	8,125	0.28%	8,895	0.33%	9,510	0.38%
Creoles	5,365	0.13%	4,585	0.12%	2,570	0.07%	1,630	0.05%	855	0.03%	735	0.03%	485	0.02%
Scandinavian (Note: Total responses to all Scandinavian–North Germanic languages, including Danish, Icelandic, Norwegian, and Swedish.)	5,300	0.13%	6,045	0.15%	6,705	0.19%	8,165	0.25%	8,850	0.3%	9,940	0.37%	11,840	0.47%
Greek	4,645	0.11%	4,935	0.12%	4,325	0.12%	4,735	0.15%	4,250	0.14%	4,435	0.17%	4,165	0.17%
Hebrew	3,705	0.09%	3,250	0.08%	2,410	0.07%	2,570	0.08%	2,240	0.08%	1,585	0.06%	1,675	0.07%
Finnish	1,020	0.02%	1,045	0.03%	1,185	0.03%	1,505	0.05%	1,410	0.05%	1,090	0.04%	1,385	0.05%
Armenian	795	0.02%	530	0.01%	525	0.01%	300	0.01%	360	0.01%	250	0.01%	335	0.01%
Total responses	4,177,715	98%	3,978,145	97.8%	3,610,185	99%	3,256,355	99%	2,941,150	98.9%	2,669,195	99%	2,519,180	99%
Total population	4,262,635	100%	4,067,175	100%	3,645,257	100%	3,290,350	100%	2,974,807	100%	2,696,826	100%	2,545,553	100%

=== Mother tongue ===
Languages of Alberta (2021):
1. English 76.6 (74.7%)
2. French 2.1 (2.05%)
3. Indigenous language 0.6 (0.59%)
4. Other language 20.9 (20.4%)
5. Multiple 2.3 (2.24%)

Of the 4,221,835 singular responses to the 2021 census question concerning mother tongue, the languages most commonly reported were:

Mother tongue in Alberta
Language	2021		2016		2011		2006		2001	
Language	Pop.	%	Pop.	%	Pop.	%	Pop.	%	Pop.	%
English	3,235,065	76.6%	2,972,670	74.71%	2,780,200	78.37%	2,576,670	79.99%	2,379,515	81.84%
Tagalog (Filipino/Pilipino)	138,160	3.27%	98,360	2.47%	60,085	1.69%	29,740	0.92%	11,705	0.40%
Chinese	128,160	3.04%	119,710	3.01%	105,470	2.97%	97,275	3.02%	78,205	2.69%
Cantonese	62,835	1.49%	59,580	1.50%	34,985	0.99%	32,485	1.01%	26,255	0.90%
Mandarin	58,535	1.39%	49,990	1.26%	19,325	0.54%	12,135	0.38%	5,580	0.19%
Min Nan languages (Teochow, Fukien, Taiwanese)	3,080	0.07%	3,075	0.08%	785	0.02%	400	0.01%	N	N
Hakka	1,075	0.03%	940	0.02%	325	0.01%	425	0.01%	570	0.02%
Chinese, n.o.s.	1,960	0.05%	N	N	N	N	N	N	N	N
Panjabi (Punjabi)	103,965	2.46%	68,315	1.72%	49,940	1.41%	36,320	1.13%	22,535	0.78%
French	88,010	2.08%	70,440	1.77%	68,545	1.93%	61,225	1.90%	58,645	2.02%
Spanish	67,865	1.61%	54,685	1.37%	44,020	1.24%	29,125	0.90%	19,820	0.68%
German	65,835	1.56%	63,570	1.60%	80,905	2.28%	84,505	2.62%	78,040	2.68%
Arabic	57,170	1.35%	40,695	1.02%	28,000	0.79%	20,495	0.64%	15,390	0.53%
Urdu	35,905	0.85%	26,860	0.68%	19,900	0.56%	11,275	0.35%	4,910	0.17%
Hindi	26,975	0.64%	16,495	0.41%	12,290	0.35%	8,985	0.28%	6,315	0.22%
Vietnamese	26,930	0.64%	23,015	0.58%	21,195	0.60%	19,350	0.60%	16,680	0.57%
Niger-Congo languages	25,230	0.60%	15,515	0.30%	N	N	N	N	N	N
Yoruba	5,565	0.13%	3,215	0.08%	N	N	N	N	N	N
Swahili	3,800	0.09%	2,390	0.06%	1,455	0.04%	850	0.03%	380	0.01%
Igbo	2,530	0.06%	1,160	0.03%	900	0.03%	N	N	N	N
Akan (Twi)	2,280	0.05%	1,765	0.04%	1,100	0.04%	345	0.01%	N	N
Kinyarwanda (Rwanda)	1,395	0.03%	770	0.02%	440	0.01%	60	0.01%	N	N
Rundi (Kirundi)	895	0.02%	570	0.01%	290	0.01%	50	0.01%	N	N
Selected Aboriginal languages	24,630	0.58%	22,970	0.58%	22,005	0.62%	20,890	0.65%	18,470	0.64%
Cree	16,445	0.41%	17,125	0.43%	16,745	0.47%	17,215	0.53%	15,105	0.52%
Blackfoot	4,800	0.11%	3,385	0.09%	3,035	0.09%	3,015	0.09%	2,630	0.09%
Dene	1,425	0.03%	1,570	0.04%	1,680	0.05%	1,585	0.05%	1,495	0.05%
Ojibway	485	0.01%	630	0.02%	455	0.01%	615	0.02%	645	0.02%
Korean	21,020	0.50%	17,400	0.44%	13,885	0.39%	10,845	0.33%	6,330	0.22%
Russian	20,280	0.48%	17,465	0.44%	13,840	0.38%	10,145	0.31%	6,980	0.29%
Ukrainian	19,885	0.47%	21,215	0.53%	24,575	0.69%	29,455	0.91%	33,970	1.17%
Polish	19,345	0.46%	19,780	0.50%	19,890	0.56%	21,990	0.68%	20,635	0.71%
Gujarati	18,675	0.44%	12,775	0.32%	8,675	0.24%	6,280	0.19%	4,910	0.17%
Persian	17,635	0.42%	14,835	0.37%	10,655	0.30%	7,700	0.24%	3,700	0.13%
Dutch	14,420	0.34%	16,005	0.40%	17,950	0.51%	19,980	0.62%	19,575	0.67%
Somali	12,310	0.29%	9,425	0.24%	5,515	0.16%	3,130	0.10%	810	0.03%
Tigrinya	11,510	0.27%	5,755	0.14%	2,460	0.07%	N	N	N	N
Italian	11,180	0.26%	11,475	0.29%	11,960	0.34%	13,095	0.41%	13,935	0.48%
Portuguese	11,090	0.26%	8,565	0.22%	7,380	0.21%	7,205	0.22%	6,110	0.21%
Malayalam	10,720	0.25%	6,230	0.16%	2,760	0.08%	1,550	0.05%	1,055	0.04%
Ilocano	9,765	0.23%	5,750	0.14%	3,010	0.08%	1,885	0.06%	N	N
Amharic	9,610	0.22%	7,015	0.18%	5,110	0.14%	2,785	0.09%	1,100	0.04%
Bengali	9,125	0.22%	6,940	0.17%	5.030	0.14%	2,710	0.08%	1,190	0.04%
Romanian	8,205	0.19%	8,255	0.21%	6,550	0.18%	4,370	0.14%	2,890	0.10%
Cebuano and other Bisayan languages	6,780	0.16%	5,025	0.13%	3,255	0.09%	1,370	0.04%	N	N
Nepali	6,645	0.16%	4,995	0.13%	1,605	0.05%	N	N	N	N
Tamil	6,450	0.15%	4,650	0.11%	2,645	0.07%	1,385	0.04%	1,110	0.04%
Hungarian	5,950	0.14%	6,505	0.16%	6,700	0.19%	6,770	0.21%	6,985	0.24%
Japanese	5,290	0.13%	4,575	0.11%	4,560	0.13%	4,555	0.14%	3,625	0.12%
Croatian	4,865	0.12%	4,425	0.11%	3,960	0.11%	4,150	0.13%	4,195	0.14%
Serbian	4,530	0.11%	4,115	0.10%	3,560	0.10%	3,090	0.10%	2,125	0.07%
Oromo language	4,030	0.10%	2,615	0.07%	1,405	0.04%	N	N	N	N
Turkish	3,860	0.09%	2,760	0.07%	2,460	0.07%	1,605	0.05%	810	0.03%
Afrikaans	3,730	0.09%	3,050	0.08%	2,420	0.07%	N	N	N	N
Telugu	3,550	0.08%	2,130	0.05%	1,245	0.03%	N	N	N	N
Scandinavian languages	3,535	0.08%	3,750	0.09%	4,935	0.14%	6,045	0.19%	6,795	0.23%
Danish	2,040	0.05%	2,225	0.06%	2,805	0.08%	3,510	0.11%	3,615	0.12%
Swedish	855	0.02%	785	0.02%	950	0.03%	1,145	0.04%	1,345	0.05%
Norwegian	640	0.02%	740	0.02%	1,180	0.03%	1,245	0.04%	1,670	0.06%
Pashto	3,435	0.08%	2,340	0.06%	1,850	0.05%	1,175	0.04%	275	0.01%
Greek	3,330	0.08%	3,285	0.08%	2,965	0.08%	3,305	0.10%	2,765	0.10%
Sindhi (includes Kacchi)	3,260	0.08%	2,835	0.07%	2,560	0.07%	2,000	0.06%	1,990	0.07%
Sinhalese	3,215	0.08%	2,935	0.07%	1,940	0.05%	835	0.03%	N	N
Hiligaynon	3,090	0.07%	1,160	0.03%	N	N	N	N	N	N
Czech	3,000	0.07%	2,715	0.07%	2,880	0.08%	3,100	0.08%	3,520	0.12%
Creole	2,770	0.07%	2,120	0.05%	1,560	0.05%	415	0.01%	250	0.01%
Albanian	2,625	0.06%	2,435	0.06%	1,685	0.05%	N	N	N	N
Thai	2,255	0.05%	1,700	0.04%	1,375	0.04%	190	0.01%	N	N

In addition to the table above, other mother tongues in Alberta include (including languages with more than 422 people, or 0.01 per cent of respondents):

- 2,120 Bosnian;
- 2,100 Slovak;
- 2,070 Khmer (Cambodian);
- 1,720 Pampangan;
- 1,655 Marathi;
- 1,495 Indonesian;
- 1,470 Kurdish;
- 1,435 Nilo-Saharan languages;
- 1,390 Bulgarian;
- 1,355 Sign languages;
- 1,155 Lao;
- 1,135 Hebrew;
- 1,020 Neo-Aramaic;
- 865 Kannada;
- 815 Finnish;
- 810 Karenic languages;
- 745 Tibetan;
- 730 Bilen;
- 715 Waray;
- 635 Mongolian;
- 635 Pangasinan;
- 625 Slovenian;
- 590 Armenian;
- 570 Lithuanian;
- 545 Burmese;
- 545 Malay;
- 425 Macedonian;

In addition to the single-language responses detailed above, about 88,765 people reported having more than one mother tongue. There were 74,515 responses of both English and a non-official language; 2,785 of both French and a non-official language; 10,005 of both English and French; and 1,455 of English, French and a non-official language.

== Religion ==
Religious affiliation (2021):
1. Christian (48.1%)
2. Muslim (4.80%)
3. Sikh (2.50%)
4. Hindu (1.90%)
5. Buddhist (1.00%)
6. Jewish (0.30%)
7. Aboriginal spirituality (0.50%)
8. Other religions (0.80%)
9. Irreligious (40.1%)
Christian sub-affiliation (2021):
1. Roman Catholic (41.5%)
2. Christian, n.o.s. (21.4%)
3. United Church (7.70%)
4. Anglican (4.80%)
5. Lutheran (4.00%)
6. Orthodox (3.20%)
7. Pentecostal (2.70%)
8. Latter Day Saints (2.30%)
9. Baptist (2.20%)
10. Presbyterian (1.10%)
11. Anabaptist (1.00%)
12. Jehovah's Witnesses (0.90%)
13. Reformed (0.70%)
14. Methodist (0.50%)
15. Other Christian (6.20%)

Just under 50 percent of Albertans identify as Christian, while over 40 percent of residents identify with no religion. The largest denominations are the Roman Catholic, United, Anglican, Lutheran, and Eastern Orthodox and Oriental Orthodox Churches.

Just over 1 percent of Albertans are members of the Church of Jesus Christ of Latter-day Saints, descended from pioneers who emigrated from Utah around the turn of the 20th century; there are three temples in the province. Alberta also has large numbers of Pentecostal, Presbyterians, and evangelical Christians.

There are significant numbers of Mennonites and Hutterites, which are communal Anabaptist sects. There are also many Jehovah's Witnesses and Reformed Christians, as well a significant population of Seventh-day Adventists in and around Lacombe where the Canadian University College is located.

Alberta is also home to several Eastern Rite Churches as part of the legacy of Eastern European immigrants, including the Ukrainian Catholic Eparchy of Edmonton, and the Ukrainian Orthodox Diocese of Edmonton and Western Canada. There are 500 Doukhobors living in their few communities across Southern Alberta.

Many people of the Hindu, Sikh, and Muslim faiths also make Alberta their home; one of the largest Sikh temples in Canada is located just outside Edmonton. Most of Alberta's Jewish population of 11,390 lives in Calgary and Edmonton.

Alberta's second largest religion, Islam, has roots that include Canada's first mosque, Al-Rashid Mosque, built in 1938 led by a Lebanese woman named Hilwie Hamdon.

Religious groups in Alberta (1981−2021)
Religious group	2021 Canadian census		2011 Canadian census		2001 Canadian census		1991 Canadian census		1981 Canadian census	
Religious group	Pop.	%	Pop.	%	Pop.	%	Pop.	%	Pop.	%
Christianity	2,009,820	48.11%	2,152,200	60.32%	2,099,435	71.38%	1,928,745	76.56%	1,903,205	85.98%
Irreligion	1,676,045	40.12%	1,126,130	31.56%	694,840	23.62%	496,150	19.69%	260,015	11.75%
Islam	202,535	4.85%	113,445	3.18%	49,045	1.67%	31,000	1.23%	16,865	0.76%
Sikhism	103,600	2.48%	52,335	1.47%	23,470	0.8%	13,550	0.54%	5,985	0.27%
Hinduism	78,520	1.88%	36,845	1.03%	15,965	0.54%	10,770	0.43%	7,360	0.33%
Buddhism	42,830	1.03%	44,410	1.24%	33,410	1.14%	20,745	0.82%	6,200	0.28%
Indigenous spirituality	19,755	0.47%	15,100	0.42%	5,860	0.2%	2,025	0.08%	385	0.02%
Judaism	11,390	0.27%	10,900	0.31%	11,085	0.38%	9,950	0.39%	10,655	0.48%
Other	33,220	0.8%	16,605	0.47%	8,040	0.27%	6,245	0.25%	2,980	0.13%
Total responses	4,177,715	98.01%	3,567,975	97.88%	2,941,150	98.87%	2,519,180	98.96%	2,213,650	98.92%
Total population	4,262,635	100%	3,645,257	100%	2,974,807	100%	2,545,553	100%	2,237,724	100%

Religion (2021) ^{1}	Denomination	Congregation	Proportion
Christian		2,009,820	48.1%
	Catholic	833,025	19.9%
	Christians, n.o.s.	429,375	10.3%
	United Church	153,820	3.7%
	Anglican Church	95,560	2.3%
	Lutheran	78,925	1.9%
	Eastern Orthodox and Oriental Orthodox	63,775	1.5%
	Pentecostal	53,900	1.3%
	Latter Day Saints	47,125	1.1%
	Baptist	44,605	1.1%
	Presbyterian	22,850	0.5%
	Anabaptist	20,035	0.5%
	Jehovah's Witnesses	18,185	0.4%
	Reformed	14,735	0.4%
	Methodist	9,640	0.2%
	Other Christian	124,265	2.8%
Muslim		202,535	4.8%
Sikh		103,600	2.5%
Hindu		78,520	1.9%
Buddhist		42,830	1.0%
Jewish		11,390	0.3%
Other religions		33,220	0.8%
Aboriginal spirituality		19,755	0.5%
No religious affiliation		1,676,045	40.1%

^1 Statistics Canada. 2022. Alberta (table). National Household Survey (NHS) Profile. 2021 National Household Survey. Released October 26, 2022.

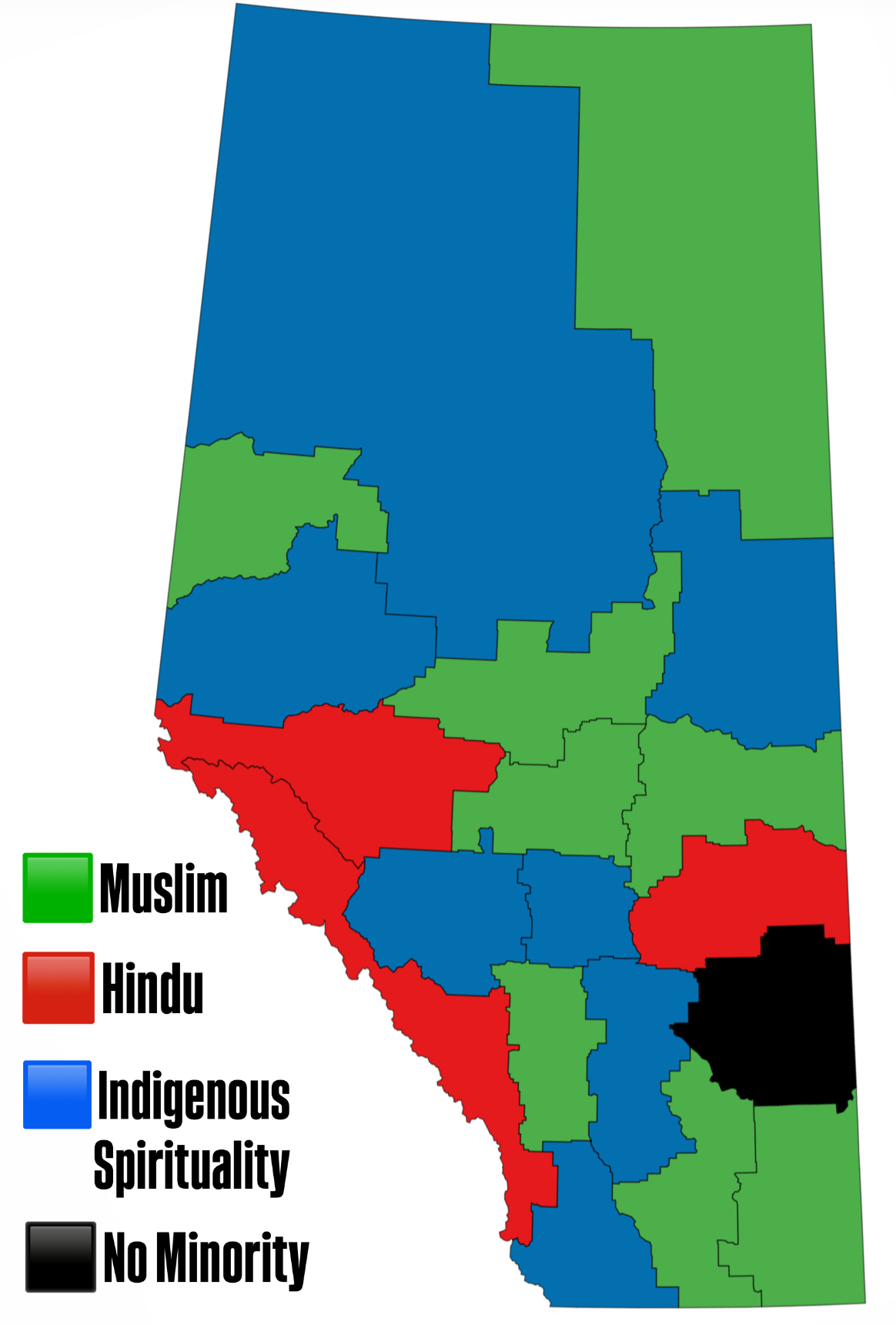
Largest non-Christian religion in Alberta by census division, 2021 census

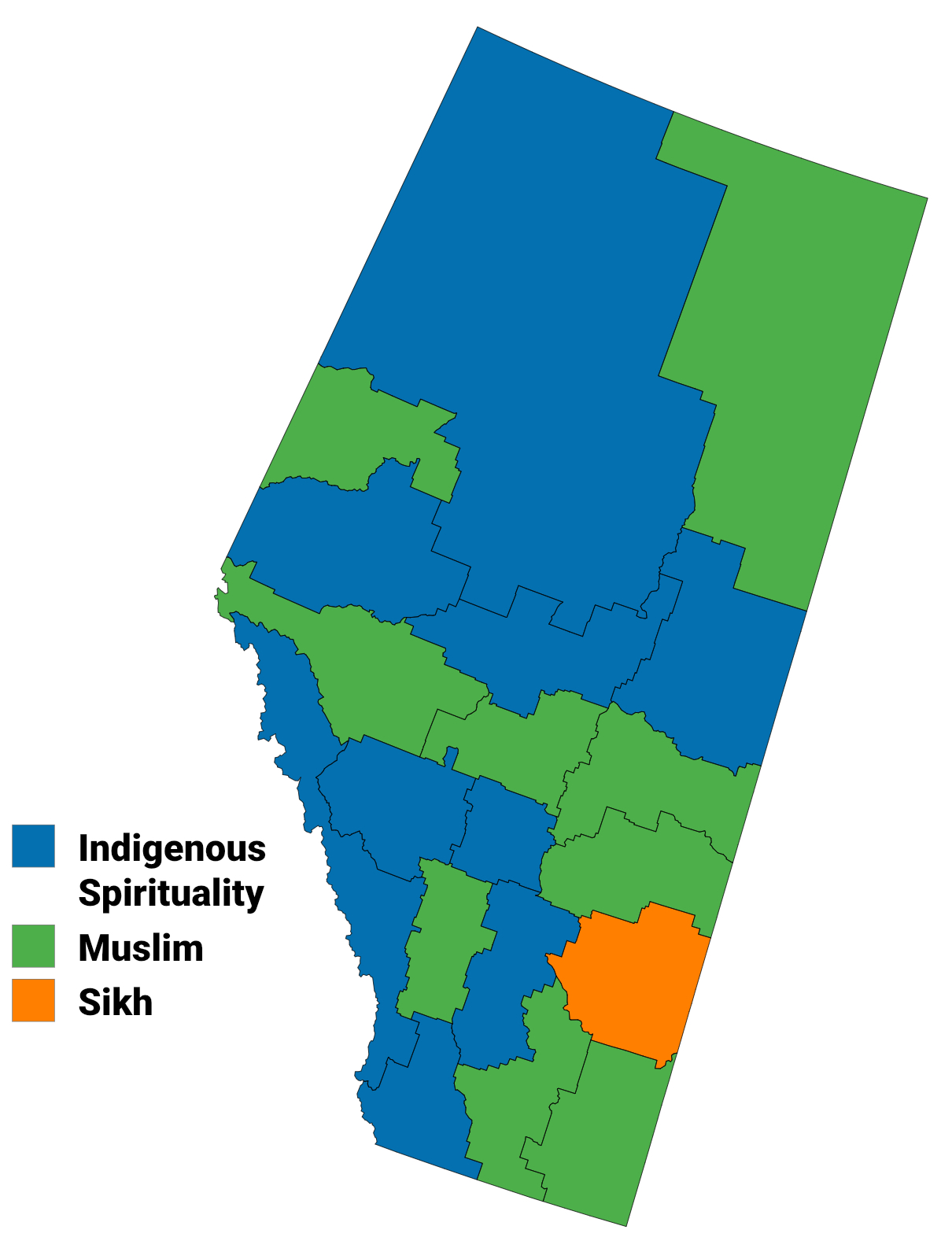
Largest non-Christian religion in Alberta by census division, 2011 census

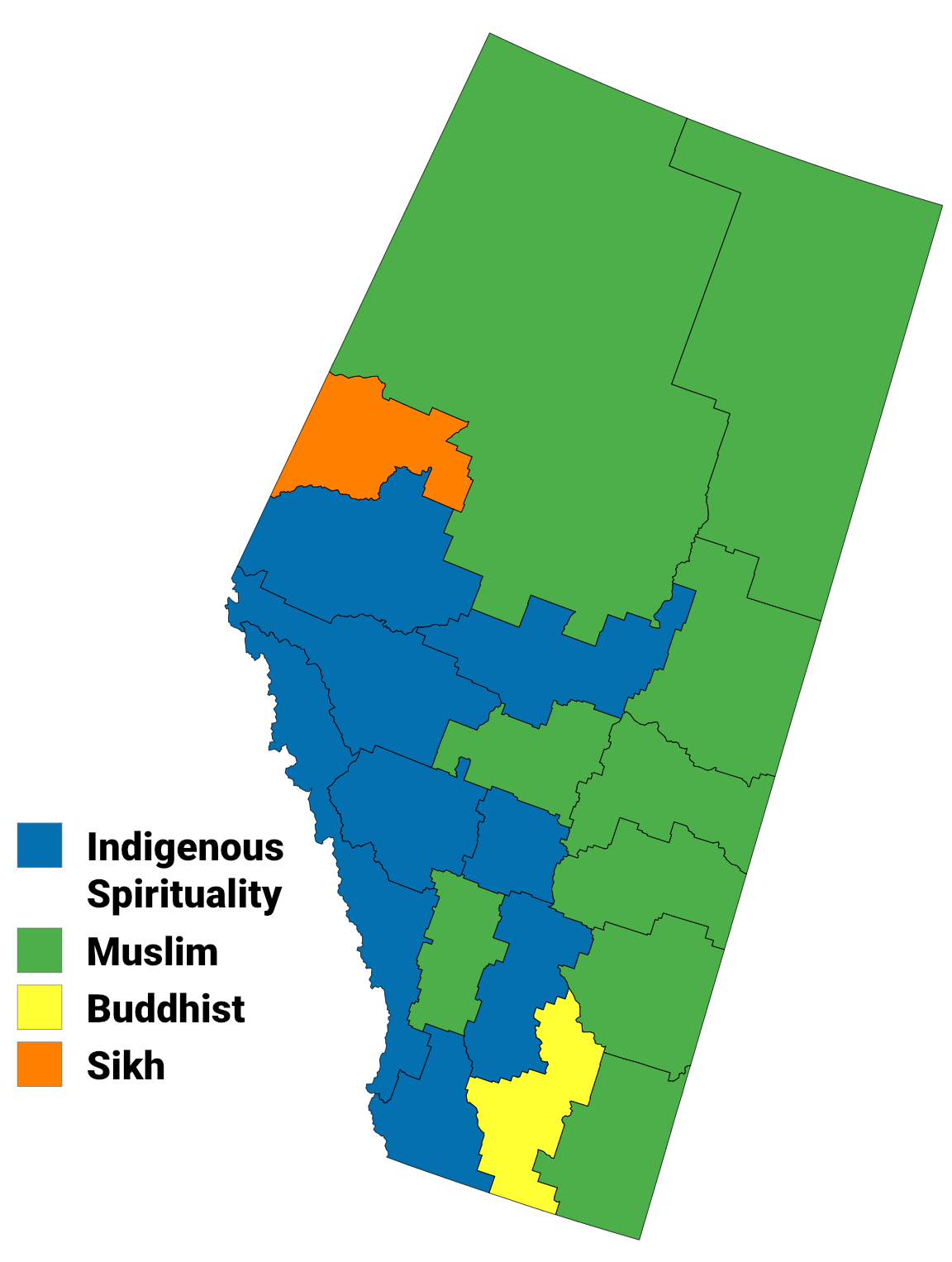
Largest non-Christian religion in Alberta by census division, 2001 census

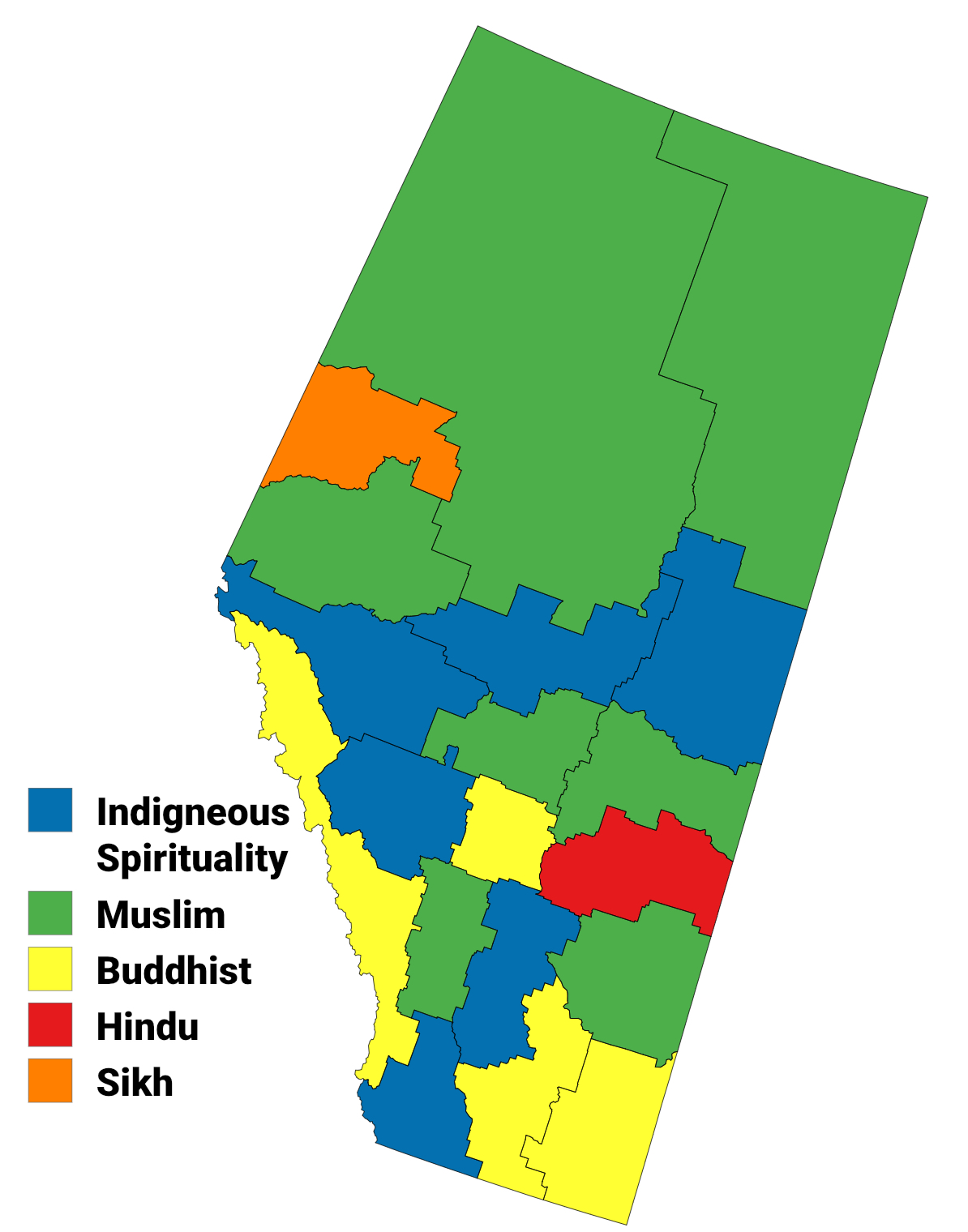
Largest non-Christian religion in Alberta by census division, 1991 census

== Migration ==
=== Immigration ===
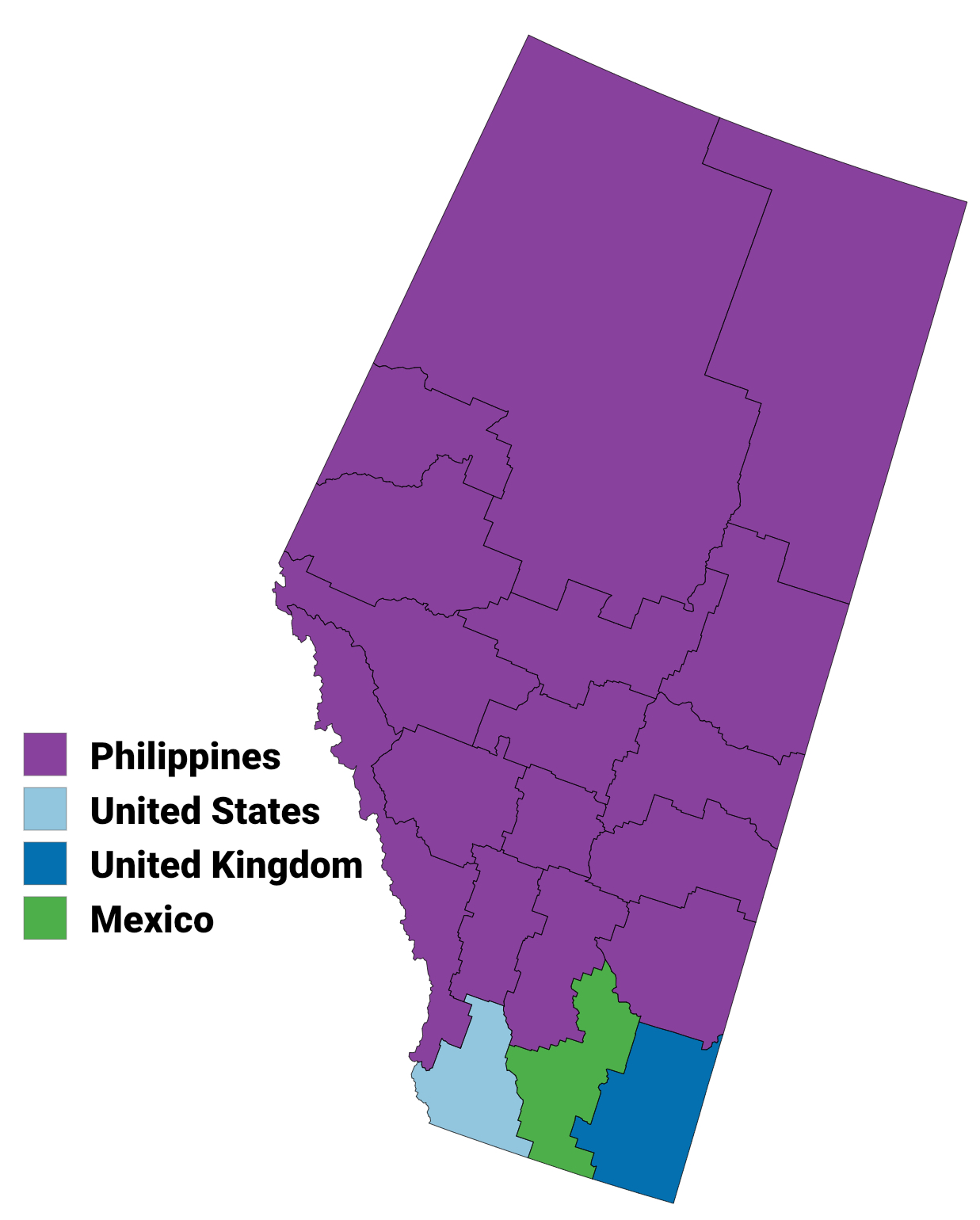
Largest nation of birth of immigrants by census division, 2021 Census

Alberta immigration statistics (1901–2021)
Census year	Immigrant percentage	Immigrant population	Total responses	Total population	Source(s)
1901 Canadian census	42.78%	31,240	73,022	73,022	
1911 Canadian census	56.75%	212,426	374,295	374,295	
1921 Canadian census	46.45%	273,364	588,454	588,454	
1931 Canadian census	41.79%	305,738	731,605	731,605	
1941 Canadian census	32.45%	258,387	796,169	796,169	
1951 Canadian census	25.55%	240,016	939,501	939,501	
1961 Canadian census	21.68%	288,749	1,331,944	1,331,944	
1971 Canadian census	17.34%	282,260	1,627,870	1,627,874	
1981 Canadian census	16.48%	364,825	2,213,650	2,237,724	
1986 Canadian census	15.76%	368,760	2,340,265	2,365,825	
1991 Canadian census	15.14%	381,515	2,519,180	2,545,553	
1996 Canadian census	15.18%	405,140	2,669,195	2,696,826	
2001 Canadian census	14.9%	438,335	2,941,150	2,974,807	
2006 Canadian census	16.18%	527,030	3,256,355	3,290,350	
2011 Canadian census	18.05%	644,115	3,567,975	3,645,257	
2016 Canadian census	21.25%	845,215	3,978,145	4,067,175	
2021 Canadian census	23.24%	970,975	4,177,715	4,262,635	

The 2021 census reported that immigrants (individuals born outside Canada) comprise 970,975 persons or 23.2 percent of the total population of Alberta.

Immigrants in Alberta by country of birth
Country of birth	2021 census		2016 census		2011 census		2006 census		2001 census		1996 census		1991 census		1986 census		1981 census		1971 census		1961 census		1951 census		1941 census		1931 census		1921 census	
Country of birth	Pop.	%	Pop.	%	Pop.	%	Pop.	%	Pop.	%	Pop.	%	Pop.	%	Pop.	%	Pop.	%	Pop.	%	Pop.	%	Pop.	%	Pop.	%	Pop.	%	Pop.	%
Philippines	167,735	17.3%	123,830	14.7%	69,575	10.8%	36,630	7%	24,800	5.7%	18,620	4.6%	12,545	3.3%	9,295	2.5%	6,665	1.8%	—N/a	—N/a	—N/a	—N/a	—N/a	—N/a	—N/a	—N/a	—N/a	—N/a	—N/a	—N/a
India	122,145	12.6%	91,660	10.8%	59,020	9.2%	38,610	7.3%	24,670	5.6%	18,360	4.5%	15,285	4%	12,760	3.5%	9,950	2.7%	2,155	0.8%	485	0.2%	239	0.1%	269	0.1%	365	0.1%	300	0.1%
China & Taiwan	64,785 (Note: China: 61,390 / Taiwan: 3,395)	6.7%	61,155 (Note: China: 57,695 / Taiwan: 3,460)	7.2%	52,555 (Note: China: 49,595 / Taiwan: 2,960)	8.2%	43,810 (Note: China: 41,495 / Taiwan: 2,315)	8.3%	29,665 (Note: China: 27,630 / Taiwan: 2,035)	6.8%	24,800 (Note: China: 23,515 / Taiwan: 1,285)	6.1%	19,490 (Note: China: 18,865 / Taiwan: 625)	5.1%	15,855 (Note: China: 15,445 / Taiwan: 410)	4.3%	12,800 (Note: China: 6,160 / Taiwan: 6,640)	3.5%	6,555	2.3%	4,300	1.5%	2,588	1.1%	2,667	1%	3,535	1.2%	3,422	1.3%
United Kingdom	56,675	5.8%	59,215	7%	58,245	9%	60,210	11.4%	59,510	13.6%	61,060	15.1%	67,545	17.7%	76,250	20.7%	82,450	22.6%	69,350	24.6%	71,307	24.7%	69,416	28.9%	77,395	30%	97,147	31.8%	90,131	33%
Pakistan	30,815	3.2%	28,080	3.3%	19,110	3%	12,095	2.3%	5,415	1.2%	3,085	0.8%	2,650	0.7%	1,925	0.5%	1,730	0.5%	245	0.1%	—N/a	—N/a	—N/a	—N/a	—N/a	—N/a	—N/a	—N/a	—N/a	—N/a
United States	30,540	3.1%	30,460	3.6%	31,050	4.8%	28,325	5.4%	27,510	6.3%	27,885	6.9%	29,630	7.8%	36,435	9.9%	43,825	12%	47,515	16.8%	51,500	17.8%	55,504	23.1%	65,682	25.4%	78,959	25.8%	99,879	36.5%
Vietnam	27,875	2.9%	27,080	3.2%	26,020	4%	24,270	4.6%	22,005	5%	21,095	5.2%	19,320	5.1%	15,455	4.2%	8,955	2.5%	—N/a	—N/a	—N/a	—N/a	—N/a	—N/a	—N/a	—N/a	—N/a	—N/a	—N/a	—N/a
Nigeria & Ghana	24,785 (Note: Nigeria: 21,065 / Ghana: 3,720)	2.6%	15,570 (Note: Nigeria: 12,405 / Ghana: 3,165)	1.8%	7,575 (Note: Nigeria: 5,570 / Ghana: 2,005)	1.2%	2,800 (Note: Nigeria: 1,740 / Ghana: 1,060)	0.5%	1,850 (Note: Nigeria: 985 / Ghana: 865)	0.4%	1,025 (Note: Nigeria: 410 / Ghana: 615)	0.3%	825	0.2%	760	0.2%	625	0.2%	—N/a	—N/a	—N/a	—N/a	—N/a	—N/a	—N/a	—N/a	—N/a	—N/a	—N/a	—N/a
Ethiopia & Eritrea	24,140 (Note: Ethiopia: 14,425 / Eritrea: 9,720)	2.5%	15,380 (Note: Ethiopia: 10,565 / Eritrea: 4,815)	1.8%	7,885 (Note: Ethiopia: 6,375 / Eritrea: 1,510)	1.2%	4,620 (Note: Ethiopia: 3,655 / Eritrea: 965)	0.9%	2,215 (Note: Ethiopia: 1,370 / Eritrea: 845)	0.5%	1,540	0.4%	1,050	0.3%	495	0.1%	—N/a	—N/a	—N/a	—N/a	—N/a	—N/a	—N/a	—N/a	—N/a	—N/a	—N/a	—N/a	—N/a	—N/a
Syria & Lebanon	19,935 (Note: Syria: 9,975 / Lebanon: 9,960)	2.1%	15,195 (Note: Syria: 4,800 / Lebanon: 10,395)	1.8%	9,575 (Note: Syria: 1,185 / Lebanon: 8,390)	1.5%	8,505 (Note: Syria: 975 / Lebanon: 7,530)	1.6%	7,480 (Note: Syria: 610 / Lebanon: 6,870)	1.7%	6,275 (Note: Syria: 420 / Lebanon: 5,855)	1.5%	5,260 (Note: Syria: 380 / Lebanon: 4,880)	1.4%	3,530 (Note: Syria: 215 / Lebanon: 3,315)	1%	3,385	0.9%	—N/a	—N/a	—N/a	—N/a	—N/a	—N/a	207	0.1%	183	0.1%	163	0.1%
Hong Kong	18,725	1.9%	19,115	2.3%	17,300	2.7%	17,455	3.3%	18,600	4.2%	20,240	5%	15,455	4.1%	10,585	2.9%	7,755	2.1%	—N/a	—N/a	—N/a	—N/a	—N/a	—N/a	—N/a	—N/a	—N/a	—N/a	—N/a	—N/a
Mexico	17,985	1.9%	15,665	1.9%	10,755	1.7%	5,970	1.1%	3,880	0.9%	2,690	0.7%	1,350	0.4%	1,145	0.3%	770	0.2%	—N/a	—N/a	—N/a	—N/a	—N/a	—N/a	—N/a	—N/a	—N/a	—N/a	—N/a	—N/a
Germany & Austria	17,965 (Note: Germany: 16,635 / Austria: 1,330)	1.7%	20,710 (Note: Germany: 19,200 / Austria: 1,510)	2.3%	21,725 (Note: Germany: 20,085 / Austria: 1,640)	3.1%	23,610 (Note: Germany: 21,570 / Austria: 2,040)	4.1%	23,965 (Note: Germany: 21,845 / Austria: 2,120)	5%	25,520 (Note: Germany: 23,320 / Austria: 2,200)	5.8%	25,275 (Note: Germany: 22,825 / Austria: 2,450)	6%	27,450 (Note: Germany: 24,535 / Austria: 2,915)	6.7%	31,355 (Note: Germany: 27,390 / Austria: 3,965)	8.6%	31,420	11.1%	35,140	12.2%	13,420	5.6%	13,160	5.1%	12,204	4%	14,587	5.3%
Ukraine & Russia	16,385 (Note: Ukraine: 8,915 / Russia: 7,470)	1.7%	15,410 (Note: Ukraine: 8,150 / Russia: 7,260)	1.8%	12,330 (Note: Ukraine: 6,430 / Russia: 5,900)	1.9%	10,285 (Note: Ukraine: 5,435 / Russia: 4,850)	2%	8,805 (Note: Ukraine: 5,170 / Russia: 3,635)	2%	8,330 (Note: Ukraine: 5,190 / Russia: 3,140)	2.1%	10,170 (Note: Includes total persons born in all republics of the Soviet Union.)	2.7%	11,470	3.1%	14,655	4%	19,470	6.9%	22,874	7.9%	27,930	11.6%	18,454	7.1%	17,971	5.9%	20,544 (Note: Galicia: 6,807 / Russia: 11,572 / Ukraine: 2,165)	7.5%
South Korea	16,180	1.7%	13,850	1.6%	9,575	1.5%	8,120	1.5%	5,290	1.2%	3,320	0.8%	2,975	0.8%	2,810	0.8%	1,210	0.3%	—N/a	—N/a	—N/a	—N/a	—N/a	—N/a	—N/a	—N/a	—N/a	—N/a	—N/a	—N/a
Poland	15,595	1.6%	16,930	2%	16,335	2.5%	19,165	3.6%	19,680	4.5%	21,095	5.2%	21,860	5.7%	20,105	5.5%	19,220	5.3%	20,505	7.3%	22,962	8%	22,759	9.5%	28,487	11%	31,756	10.4%	2,959	1.1%
Kenya & Tanzania & Uganda	13,690 (Note: Kenya: 6,070 / Tanzania: 4,655 / Uganda: 2,965)	1.4%	11,925 (Note: Kenya: 5,125 / Tanzania: 4,510 / Uganda: 2,290)	1.4%	10,080 (Note: Kenya: 4,010 / Tanzania: 4,465 / Uganda: 1,605)	1.6%	9,005 (Note: Kenya: 3,425 / Tanzania: 4,035 / Uganda: 1,545)	1.7%	8,700 (Note: Kenya: 2,875 / Tanzania: 4,435 / Uganda: 1,390)	2%	8,355 (Note: Kenya: 2,945 / Tanzania: 3,875 / Uganda: 1,535)	2.1%	8,635 (Note: Kenya: 2,865 / Tanzania: 4,340 / Uganda: 1,430)	2.3%	7,390 (Note: Kenya: 2,265 / Tanzania: 3,700 / Uganda: 1,425)	2%	6,585	1.8%	—N/a	—N/a	—N/a	—N/a	—N/a	—N/a	—N/a	—N/a	—N/a	—N/a	—N/a	—N/a
Netherlands	12,730	1.3%	14,035	1.7%	15,290	2.4%	16,715	3.2%	17,385	4%	17,555	4.3%	18,620	4.9%	19,570	5.3%	20,475	5.6%	18,045	6.4%	19,522	6.8%	6,741	2.8%	2,142	0.8%	2,466	0.8%	1,765	0.6%
Former Yugoslavia	12,060	1.2%	12,125	1.4%	9,280	1.4%	11,550	2.2%	11,060	2.5%	8,120	2%	5,110	1.3%	5,560	1.5%	6,225	1.7%	4,615	1.6%	3,420	1.2%	1,341	0.6%	1,212	0.5%	1,231	0.4%	282	0.1%
Jamaica & Trinidad and Tobago	12,055 (Note: Jamaica: 8,695 / Trinidad and Tobago: 3,360)	1.2%	10,260 (Note: Jamaica: 6,845 / Trinidad and Tobago: 3,415)	1.2%	7,290 (Note: Jamaica: 4,340 / Trinidad and Tobago: 2,950)	1.1%	7,015 (Note: Jamaica: 3,755 / Trinidad and Tobago: 3,260)	1.3%	6,405 (Note: Jamaica: 3,705 / Trinidad and Tobago: 2,700)	1.5%	6,030 (Note: Jamaica: 3,015 / Trinidad and Tobago: 3,015)	1.5%	6,465 (Note: Jamaica: 3,765 / Trinidad and Tobago: 2,700)	1.7%	6,360 (Note: Jamaica: 3,660 / Trinidad and Tobago: 2,700)	1.7%	5,835	1.6%	1,455	0.5%	349 (Note: All individuals born in the British West Indies.)	0.1%	122	0.1%	59	0%	89	0%	110	0%
Colombia	10,385	1.1%	9,535	1.1%	6,860	1.1%	3,155	0.6%	945	0.2%	525	0.1%	450	0.1%	270	0.1%	—N/a	—N/a	—N/a	—N/a	—N/a	—N/a	—N/a	—N/a	—N/a	—N/a	—N/a	—N/a	—N/a	—N/a
El Salvador & Guatemala & Nicaragua	10,330 (Note: El Salvador: 6,940 / Guatemala: 1,915 / Nicaragua: 1,475)	1.1%	10,285 (Note: El Salvador: 7,255 / Guatemala: 1,775 / Nicaragua: 1,255)	1.2%	7,870 (Note: El Salvador: 5,530 / Guatemala: 1,490 / Nicaragua: 850)	1.2%	8,175 (Note: El Salvador: 5,475 / Guatemala: 1,360 / Nicaragua: 1,340)	1.6%	6,990 (Note: El Salvador: 4,695 / Guatemala: 1,240 / Nicaragua: 1,055)	1.6%	6,940 (Note: El Salvador: 4,760 / Guatemala: 1,130 / Nicaragua: 1,050)	1.7%	5,850 (Note: El Salvador: 3,660 / Guatemala: 840 / Nicaragua: 1,350)	1.5%	2,060 (Note: El Salvador: 1,505 / Guatemala: 265 / Nicaragua: 290)	0.6%	395	0.1%	—N/a	—N/a	—N/a	—N/a	—N/a	—N/a	—N/a	—N/a	—N/a	—N/a	—N/a	—N/a
South Africa	8,960	0.9%	7,355	0.9%	6,010	0.9%	4,950	0.9%	4,025	0.9%	2,245	0.6%	2,510	0.7%	1,985	0.5%	1,960	0.5%	—N/a	—N/a	394	0.1%	195	0.1%	223	0.1%	267	0.1%	230	0.1%
Iran	8,865	0.9%	8,910	1.1%	5,595	0.9%	3,995	0.8%	2,400	0.5%	1,510	0.4%	1,575	0.4%	680	0.2%	570	0.2%	—N/a	—N/a	—N/a	—N/a	—N/a	—N/a	—N/a	—N/a	—N/a	—N/a	—N/a	—N/a
Somalia	8,545	0.9%	7,060	0.8%	3,395	0.5%	2,120	0.4%	795	0.2%	410	0.1%	125	0%	30	0%	—N/a	—N/a	—N/a	—N/a	—N/a	—N/a	—N/a	—N/a	—N/a	—N/a	—N/a	—N/a	—N/a	—N/a
Romania	7,190	0.7%	7,725	0.9%	6,235	1%	5,165	1%	3,920	0.9%	2,975	0.7%	2,825	0.7%	2,655	0.7%	2,330	0.6%	2,415	0.9%	3,249	1.1%	1,981	0.8%	5,245	2%	8,202	2.7%	3,073	1.1%
Sudan & South Sudan	6,995	0.7%	5,375	0.6%	4,625	0.7%	3,400	0.6%	1,055	0.2%	385	0.1%	225	0.1%	90	0%	90	0%	—N/a	—N/a	—N/a	—N/a	—N/a	—N/a	—N/a	—N/a	—N/a	—N/a	—N/a	—N/a
Italy	6,990	0.7%	8,115	1%	8,050	1.2%	8,705	1.7%	9,830	2.2%	9,870	2.4%	11,020	2.9%	11,280	3.1%	11,810	3.2%	11,065	3.9%	7,485	2.6%	2,171	0.9%	1,959	0.8%	2,321	0.8%	2,486	0.9%
Egypt	6,760	0.7%	5,320	0.6%	3,120	0.5%	2,140	0.4%	1,490	0.3%	1,230	0.3%	1,030	0.3%	885	0.2%	735	0.2%	—N/a	—N/a	—N/a	—N/a	—N/a	—N/a	—N/a	—N/a	—N/a	—N/a	—N/a	—N/a
Afghanistan	6,585	0.7%	5,190	0.6%	4,345	0.7%	3,305	0.6%	1,695	0.4%	530	0.1%	255	0.1%	170	0%	—N/a	—N/a	—N/a	—N/a	—N/a	—N/a	—N/a	—N/a	—N/a	—N/a	—N/a	—N/a	—N/a	—N/a
Iraq	6,215	0.6%	5,935	0.7%	3,825	0.6%	2,300	0.4%	1,490	0.3%	1,005	0.2%	380	0.1%	415	0.1%	—N/a	—N/a	—N/a	—N/a	—N/a	—N/a	—N/a	—N/a	—N/a	—N/a	—N/a	—N/a	—N/a	—N/a
Bangladesh	6,035	0.6%	5,085	0.6%	3,680	0.6%	1,835	0.3%	690	0.2%	275	0.1%	255	0.1%	200	0.1%	265	0.1%	—N/a	—N/a	—N/a	—N/a	—N/a	—N/a	—N/a	—N/a	—N/a	—N/a	—N/a	—N/a
DR Congo & Cameroon	5,920 (Note: DR Congo: 3,215 / Cameroon: 2,705)	0.6%	4,690 (Note: DR Congo: 2,930 / Cameroon: 1,760)	0.6%	2,305 (Note: DR Congo: 1,495 / Cameroon: 810)	0.4%	870 (Note: DR Congo: 785 / Cameroon: 85)	0.2%	380 (Note: DR Congo: 345 / Cameroon: 35)	0.1%	115 (Note: DR Congo: 115 / Cameroon: 0)	0%	80	0%	105	0%	35	0%	—N/a	—N/a	—N/a	—N/a	—N/a	—N/a	—N/a	—N/a	—N/a	—N/a	—N/a	—N/a
Malaysia & Singapore	5,405 (Note: Malaysia: 3,990 / Singapore: 1,415)	0.6%	5,795 (Note: Malaysia: 4,260 / Singapore: 1,535)	0.7%	4,765 (Note: Malaysia: 3,500 / Singapore: 1,265)	0.8%	4,250 (Note: Malaysia: 3,215 / Singapore: 1,035)	0.8%	3,880 (Note: Malaysia: 2,855 / Singapore: 1,025)	0.9%	3,820 (Note: Malaysia: 2,955 / Singapore: 865)	0.9%	3,280 (Note: Malaysia: 2,570 / Singapore: 710)	0.9%	2,205 (Note: Malaysia: 1,620 / Singapore: 585)	0.6%	—N/a	—N/a	—N/a	—N/a	—N/a	—N/a	—N/a	—N/a	—N/a	—N/a	—N/a	—N/a	—N/a	—N/a
Australia & New Zealand	5,390	0.6%	5,115	0.6%	4,610	0.7%	4,030	0.8%	3,830	0.9%	3,270	0.8%	3,380	0.9%	3,380	0.9%	3,495	1%	1,875	0.7%	857	0.3%	383	0.2%	296	0.1%	417	0.1%	391	0.1%
Nepal	4,970	0.5%	3,915	0.5%	1,260	0.2%	490	0.1%	115	0%	50	0%	—N/a	—N/a	—N/a	—N/a	—N/a	—N/a	—N/a	—N/a	—N/a	—N/a	—N/a	—N/a	—N/a	—N/a	—N/a	—N/a	—N/a	—N/a
Sri Lanka	4,930	0.5%	4,835	0.6%	3,295	0.5%	1,600	0.3%	1,330	0.3%	1,120	0.3%	1,015	0.3%	745	0.2%	515	0.1%	—N/a	—N/a	—N/a	—N/a	—N/a	—N/a	—N/a	—N/a	—N/a	—N/a	—N/a	—N/a
Venezuela	4,800	0.5%	4,335	0.5%	1,930	0.3%	1,350	0.3%	500	0.1%	340	0.1%	—N/a	—N/a	—N/a	—N/a	—N/a	—N/a	—N/a	—N/a	—N/a	—N/a	—N/a	—N/a	—N/a	—N/a	—N/a	—N/a	—N/a	—N/a
Fiji	4,690	0.5%	4,625	0.5%	4,140	0.6%	3,975	0.8%	3,395	0.8%	3,460	0.9%	2,675	0.7%	1,530	0.4%	1,720	0.5%	290	0.1%	—N/a	—N/a	—N/a	—N/a	—N/a	—N/a	—N/a	—N/a	—N/a	—N/a
Czech Republic & Slovakia	4,455	0.5%	4,260	0.5%	4,050	0.6%	4,805	0.9%	4,570	1%	4,785	1.2%	4,980	1.3%	5,005	1.4%	4,895	1.3%	5,075	1.8%	4,515	1.6%	4,047	1.7%	4,496	1.7%	4,496	1.5%	1,106	0.4%
Ireland	4,225	0.4%	3,940	0.5%	2,795	0.4%	2,475	0.5%	2,840	0.6%	2,995	0.7%	2,925	0.8%	2,675	0.7%	1,700	0.5%	3,365	1.2%	7,499	2.6%	6,381	2.7%	7,505	2.9%	9,634	3.2%	7,374	2.7%
Chile	4,215	0.4%	4,255	0.5%	4,305	0.7%	4,345	0.8%	3,775	0.9%	3,775	0.9%	3,890	1%	4,065	1.1%	3,430	0.9%	—N/a	—N/a	—N/a	—N/a	—N/a	—N/a	—N/a	—N/a	—N/a	—N/a	—N/a	—N/a
Scandinavia (Note: Includes Denmark, Finland, Iceland, Norway and Sweden.)	3,865	0.4%	4,075	0.5%	4,810	0.7%	5,300	1%	5,480	1.3%	6,045	1.5%	6,655	1.7%	8,905	2.4%	9,615	2.6%	11,750	4.2%	16,146	5.6%	15,147	6.3%	18,347	7.1%	23,295	7.6%	17,073	6.2%
Brazil	3,800	0.4%	2,545	0.3%	1,740	0.3%	1,130	0.2%	750	0.2%	670	0.2%	425	0.1%	405	0.1%	390	0.1%	—N/a	—N/a	—N/a	—N/a	—N/a	—N/a	—N/a	—N/a	—N/a	—N/a	—N/a	—N/a
Portugal	3,725	0.4%	4,055	0.5%	3,465	0.5%	4,435	0.8%	4,395	1%	3,995	1%	4,220	1.1%	4,465	1.2%	4,470	1.2%	1,570	0.6%	—N/a	—N/a	—N/a	—N/a	—N/a	—N/a	—N/a	—N/a	—N/a	—N/a
France & Belgium	3,655 (Note: France: 2,720 / Belgium: 935)	0.4%	3,535 (Note: France: 2,540 / Belgium: 995)	0.4%	3,365 (Note: France: 2,395 / Belgium: 970)	0.5%	2,990 (Note: France: 2,065 / Belgium: 925)	0.6%	2,805 (Note: France: 1,915 / Belgium: 890)	0.6%	2,710 (Note: France: 1,795 / Belgium: 915)	0.7%	2,830 (Note: France: 1,690 / Belgium: 1,140)	0.7%	3,165 (Note: France: 2,035 / Belgium: 1,130)	0.9%	3,820 (Note: France: 2,500 / Belgium: 1,320)	1%	3,320	1.2%	3,192	1.1%	2,469	1%	2,625	1%	3,287	1.1%	3,803	1.4%
Japan	3,380	0.3%	3,060	0.4%	2,935	0.5%	2,265	0.4%	1,730	0.4%	1,395	0.3%	1,310	0.3%	1,485	0.4%	1,405	0.4%	975	0.3%	725	0.3%	834	0.3%	202	0.1%	353	0.1%	374	0.1%
Zimbabwe	3,375	0.3%	3,025	0.4%	2,145	0.3%	1,010	0.2%	505	0.1%	375	0.1%	—N/a	—N/a	—N/a	—N/a	—N/a	—N/a	—N/a	—N/a	—N/a	—N/a	—N/a	—N/a	—N/a	—N/a	—N/a	—N/a	—N/a	—N/a
Hungary	3,080	0.3%	3,665	0.4%	3,620	0.6%	4,080	0.8%	4,390	1%	5,015	1.2%	5,120	1.3%	6,230	1.7%	6,420	1.8%	6,375	2.3%	7,382	2.6%	4,088	1.7%	5,005	1.9%	4,367	1.4%	693	0.3%
Total immigrants	970,975	23.2%	845,215	21.2%	644,115	18.1%	527,030	16.2%	438,335	14.9%	405,140	15.2%	381,515	15.1%	368,760	15.8%	364,825	16.5%	282,260	17.3%	288,749	21.7%	240,016	25.5%	258,387	32.5%	305,738	41.8%	273,364	46.5%
Total responses	4,177,715	98%	3,978,145	97.8%	3,567,975	97.9%	3,256,355	99%	2,941,150	98.9%	2,669,195	99%	2,519,180	99%	2,340,265	98.9%	2,213,650	98.9%	1,627,875	100%	1,331,944	100%	939,501	100%	796,169	100%	731,605	100%	588,454	100%
Total population	4,262,635	100%	4,067,175	100%	3,645,257	100%	3,290,350	100%	2,974,807	100%	2,696,826	100%	2,545,553	100%	2,365,825	100%	2,237,724	100%	1,627,874	100%	1,331,944	100%	939,501	100%	796,169	100%	731,605	100%	588,454	100%

=== Recent immigration ===
The 2021 Canadian census counted a total of 193,170 people who immigrated to Alberta between 2016 and 2021.

Recent immigrants to Alberta by Country of birth (2016 to 2021)
Country of Birth	Population	% recent immigrants
Philippines	47,605	24.6%
India	31,815	16.5%
Nigeria	9,840	5.1%
China	9,495	4.9%
Syria	7,295	3.8%
United States	5,175	2.7%
Eritrea	5,120	2.7%
Mexico	4,165	2.2%
Pakistan	4,080	2.1%
Ethiopia	3,960	2.1%
United Kingdom	3,800	2%
South Korea	3,430	1.8%
Jamaica	2,135	1.1%
Ukraine	2,045	1.1%
Somalia	1,960	1%
South Africa	1,950	1%
Vietnam	1,765	0.9%
Iran	1,420	0.7%
Nepal	1,365	0.7%
Brazil	1,360	0.7%
Afghanistan	1,355	0.7%
Colombia	1,305	0.7%
Iraq	1,305	0.7%
Venezuela	1,220	0.6%
Egypt	1,190	0.6%
Total recent immigrants	193,170	100%

=== Interprovincial migration ===
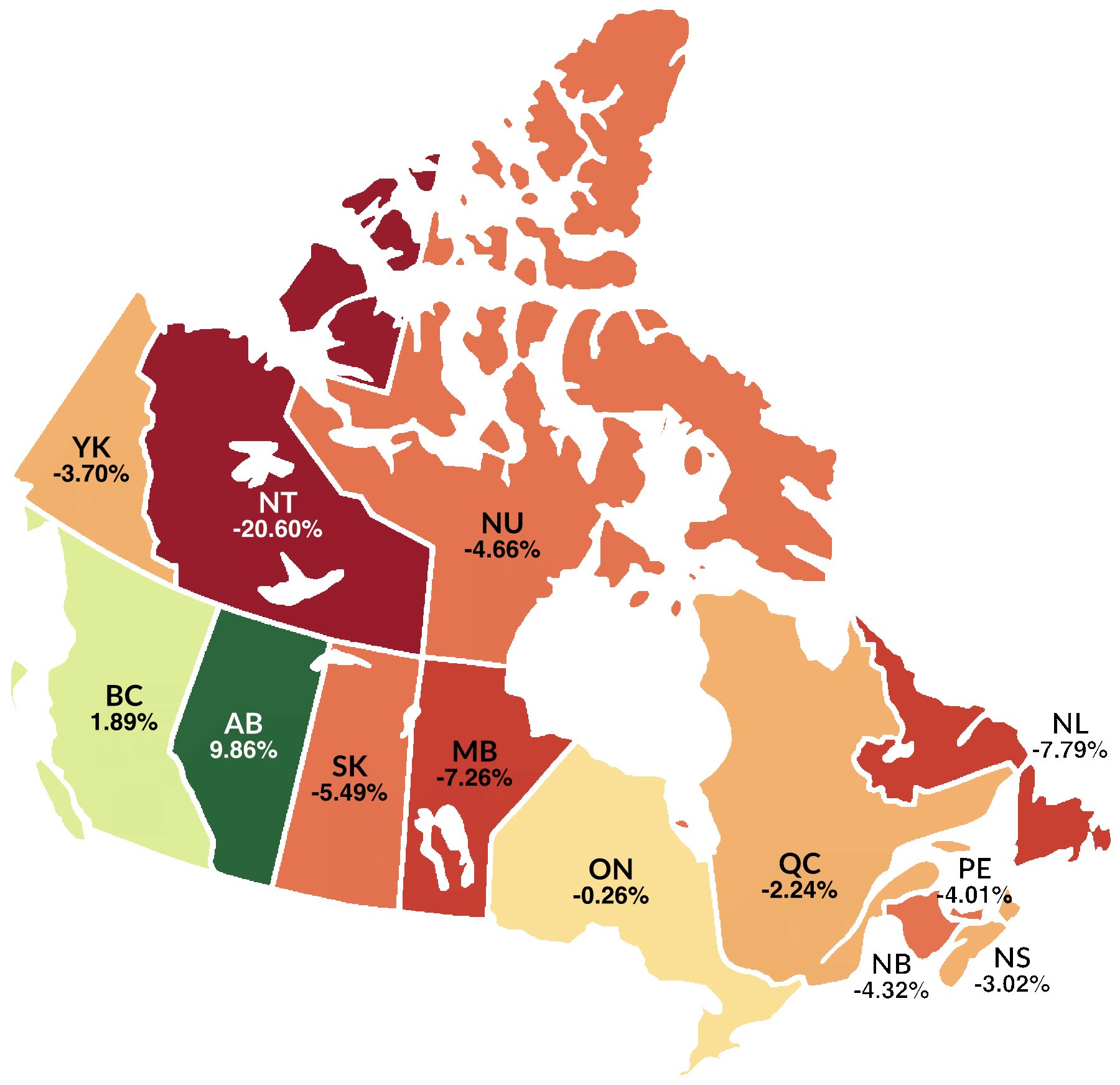
Net cumulative interprovincial migration per Province from 1997 to 2017, as a share of population of each Provinces

Over the past five decades, Alberta has had the highest net increase from interprovincial migration of any province. However, it typically experiences population decline during economic downturns, as it did during the 1980s. Oil is the main industry driving interprovincial migration to Alberta, as many Canadians move to Alberta to work on the oil fields. Interprovincial migration to Alberta rises and drops dependent of the price of oil. There was a dramatic reduction after the 2014 drop in oil prices.

Interprovincial migration in Alberta
	In-migrants	Out-migrants	Net migration
2009–10	▼57,958	▼61,229	▼ −3,271
2010–11	▲63,975	▼55,532	▲8,443
2011–12	▲80,837	▼53,185	▲27,652
2012–13	▲84,602	▼46,004	▲38,598
2013–14	▲87,307	▲51,925	▼35,382
2014–15	▼81,540	▲59,946	▼21,594
2015–16	▼56,978	▲72,086	▼ −15,108
2016–17	▼50,396	▼65,955	▼ −15,559
2017–18	▲55,147	▼58,394	▲ −3,247
2018–19	▲65,778	▲60,236	▲5,542
2019–20	▲85,919	▲77,519	▲8,400

Source: Statistics Canada

== See also ==
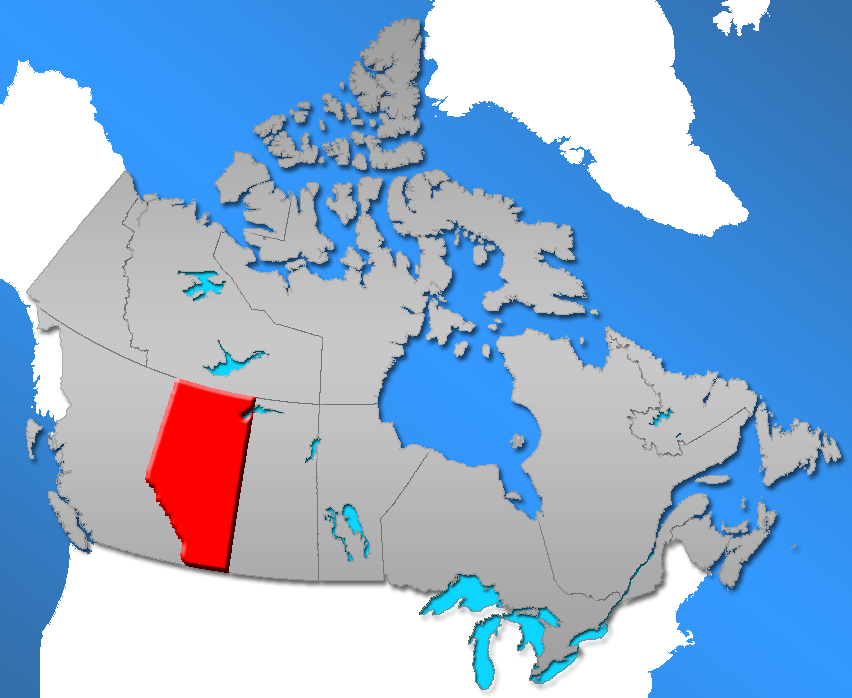
Demographics of Canada's provinces and territories
- Demographics of Calgary
- Demographics of Canada
- Demographics of Edmonton
- Population of Canada by province and territory
