= Demographics of Edmonton =

City of Edmonton Federal census population history
Year	Pop.	±%
1901	2,626	—
1906	11,167	+325.2%
1911	24,900	+123.0%
1916	53,846	+116.2%
1921	58,821	+9.2%
1926	65,163	+10.8%
1931	79,197	+21.5%
1936	85,774	+8.3%
1941	93,817	+9.4%
1946	113,116	+20.6%
1951	159,631	+41.1%
1956	226,002	+41.6%
1961	281,027	+24.3%
1966	376,925	+34.1%
1971	438,152	+16.2%
1976	461,361	+5.3%
1981	532,246	+15.4%
1986	573,982	+7.8%
1991	616,741	+7.4%
1996	616,306	−0.1%
2001	666,104	+8.1%
2006	730,372	+9.6%
2011	812,201	+11.2%
2016	932,546	+14.8%
2021	1,010,899	+8.4%
Source: Statistics Canada

According to the 2021 census, the City of Edmonton had a population of 1,010,899 residents, compared to 4,262,635 for all of Alberta, Canada. The total population of the Edmonton census metropolitan area (CMA) was 1,418,118, making it the sixth-largest CMA in Canada.

== Growth and density ==
In the five years between 2016 and 2021, the population of the City of Edmonton grew by 8.3%, compared with an increase of 7.3% for the Edmonton CMA and 10.8% for Alberta as a whole. The population density of the City of Edmonton averaged 1,320.4 inhabitants per square kilometre (3,420/sq mi), compared with an average of 6.7/km^{2} (17/sq mi) for Alberta altogether.

== Age and gender ==
In mid-2006, 11.9% of Edmonton's population were of retirement age (65 and over for males and females) compared with 13.7% in Canada. The median age was 35.3 years of age, compared to 37.6 years of age for all of Canada. Also, according to the 2006 census, 50.5% of the population within the City of Edmonton were female, while 49.5% were male. Children under five accounted for approximately 5.6% of the resident population of Edmonton. This compares with 6.2% in Alberta, and almost 5.2% for Canada overall.

== Ethnic origin ==
=== Metro Edmonton ===
Largest ethnic origin in Edmonton CMA by census tract based on the 2021 census

The largest ethnicities in the Edmonton CMA as per the 2021 census are English (16.3%), German (14.3%), Scottish (13.8%), Irish (12.9%), and Ukrainian (10.8%).

Largest panethnic group in Edmonton CMA by census tract based on the 2021 census

Panethnic groups in Metro Edmonton (2001−2021)
Panethnic group	2021		2016		2011		2006		2001	
Panethnic group	Pop.	%	Pop.	%	Pop.	%	Pop.	%	Pop.	%
European (Note: 2001-2016: Statistic includes all persons that did not make up part of a visible minority or an indigenous identity. 2021: Statistic includes all persons belonging to the non-indigenous and non-visible minority “White” population group.)	849,515	60.78%	857,085	66.07%	822,830	72.2%	797,420	77.81%	750,315	80.94%
South Asian	123,340	8.82%	91,420	7.05%	61,135	5.36%	40,205	3.92%	29,065	3.14%
Southeast Asian (Note: Statistic includes total responses of "Filipino" and "Southeast Asian" under visible minority section on census.)	101,410	7.26%	78,310	6.04%	56,240	4.94%	30,655	2.99%	23,865	2.57%
Indigenous	87,600	6.27%	76,205	5.87%	61,765	5.42%	52,105	5.08%	40,930	4.42%
African	80,575	5.76%	57,820	4.46%	32,725	2.87%	20,380	1.99%	14,095	1.52%
East Asian (Note: Statistic includes total responses of "Chinese", "Korean", and "Japanese" under visible minority section on census.)	74,140	5.3%	70,255	5.42%	59,140	5.19%	53,235	5.19%	45,965	4.96%
Middle Eastern (Note: Statistic includes total responses of "West Asian" and "Arab" under visible minority section on census.)	39,955	2.86%	32,255	2.49%	21,590	1.89%	14,865	1.45%	10,840	1.17%
Latin American	21,955	1.57%	18,755	1.45%	14,530	1.28%	9,210	0.9%	7,515	0.81%
Other/Multiracial (Note: Statistic includes total responses of "Visible minority, n.i.e." and "Multiple visible minorities" under visible minority section on census.)	20,200	1.45%	15,170	1.17%	9,640	0.85%	6,750	0.66%	4,430	0.48%
Total responses	1,397,750	98.56%	1,297,280	98.17%	1,139,585	98.25%	1,024,820	99.02%	927,020	98.85%
Total population	1,418,118	100%	1,321,426	100%	1,159,869	100%	1,034,945	100%	937,845	100%
Note: Totals greater than 100% due to multiple origin responses

==== Future projections ====
Pan−ethnic Origin Projections (2041)
	2041	
	Population	%
European (Note: Statistic includes all persons that did not make up part of a visible minority or an aboriginal identity.)	1,000,000	44.23%
South Asian	303,000	13.4%
Southeast Asian	236,000	10.44%
African	225,000	9.95%
Indigenous	141,000	6.24%
East Asian	141,000	6.24%
Middle Eastern	124,000	5.48%
Latin American	48,000	2.12%
Other/multiracial	43,000	1.9%
Projected Metro Edmonton Population	2,261,000	100%

=== City of Edmonton ===
In 2016, people of Canadian origin make up the largest ethnic cluster in Edmonton. Since 2011, visible minorities accounted for over 30% of the population, while more than 5% of Edmontonians were considered Aboriginal.

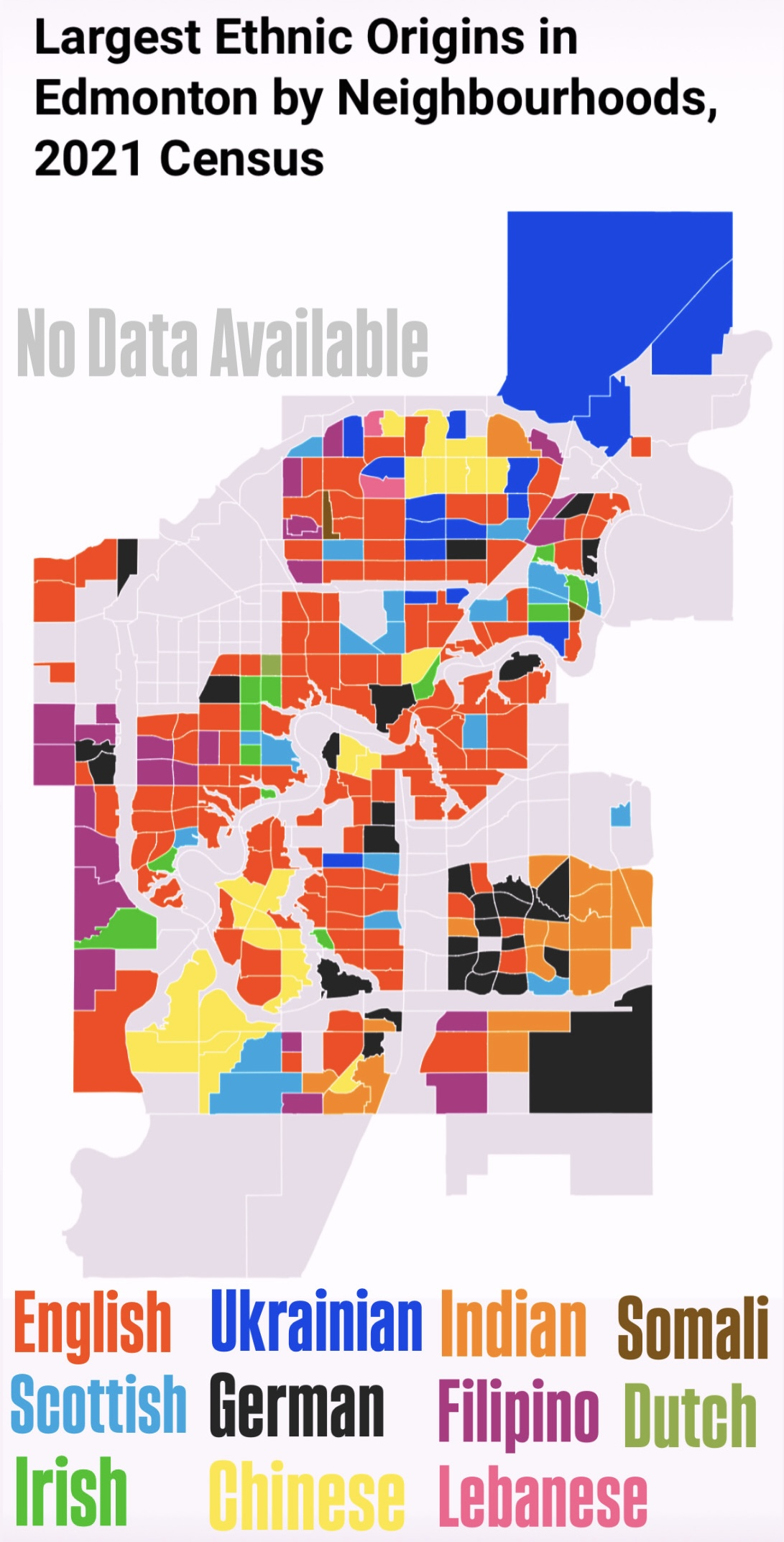
Largest ethnic origins in Edmonton by neighbourhood, 2021 census

Population by ethnicity, 2016
Ethnic origin	Population	Percent
Canadian	159,070	17.41%
English	153,740	16.83%
Scottish	126,100	13.80%
German	124,170	13.59%
Irish	113,795	12.46%
Ukrainian	98,820	10.82%
French	85,565	9.37%
Chinese	67,970	7.44%
East Indian	67,935	7.44%
Filipino	57,050	6.24%

Panethnic groups in the City of Edmonton (2001−2021)
Panethnic group	2021		2016		2011		2006		2001	
Panethnic group	Pop.	%	Pop.	%	Pop.	%	Pop.	%	Pop.	%
European (Note: Statistic includes all persons that did not make up part of a visible minority or an indigenous identity.)	512,125	51.39%	524,270	57.39%	514,935	64.72%	518,620	71.81%	497,655	75.71%
South Asian	114,985	11.54%	86,550	9.47%	57,500	7.23%	38,225	5.29%	27,845	4.24%
Southeast Asian	89,755	9.01%	70,285	7.69%	52,045	6.54%	28,880	4%	22,535	3.43%
African	75,525	7.58%	54,285	5.94%	30,355	3.81%	19,020	2.63%	12,920	1.97%
East Asian	69,965	7.02%	66,680	7.3%	56,305	7.08%	50,590	7%	44,175	6.72%
Indigenous	58,165	5.84%	50,280	5.5%	41,985	5.28%	38,170	5.28%	30,365	4.62%
Middle Eastern	38,175	3.83%	30,360	3.32%	20,410	2.57%	13,895	1.92%	10,405	1.58%
Latin American	19,455	1.95%	16,980	1.86%	13,330	1.68%	8,650	1.2%	7,265	1.11%
Other/Multiracial	18,330	1.84%	13,910	1.52%	8,815	1.11%	6,195	0.86%	4,195	0.64%
Total responses	996,485	98.57%	913,585	97.97%	795,675	97.97%	722,255	98.89%	657,355	98.69%
Total population	1,010,899	100%	932,546	100%	812,201	100%	730,372	100%	666,104	100%
Note: Totals greater than 100% due to multiple origin responses

== Language ==
=== Metro Edmonton ===
The question on knowledge of languages allows for multiple responses. The following figures are from the 2021 Canadian Census, and lists languages that were selected by at least 1,000 respondents.

Knowledge of Languages in Metro Edmonton
Language	2021	
Language	Pop.	%
English	1,372,110	98.17%
French	96,620	6.91%
Cree	3,915	0.28%
Oromo	2,615	0.19%
Somali	10,555	0.76%
Amharic	5,965	0.43%
Arabic	34,760	2.49%
Hebrew	1,360	0.1%
Tigrinya	6,440	0.46%
Khmer (Cambodian)	1,055	0.08%
Vietnamese	12,490	0.89%
Bisaya, n.o.s.	1,055	0.08%
Cebuano	3,190	0.23%
Hiligaynon	1,510	0.11%
Ilocano	4,760	0.34%
Tagalog	63,930	4.57%
Malayalam	6,485	0.46%
Tamil	4,870	0.35%
Telugu	2,140	0.15%
Czech	1,035	0.07%
Polish	10,715	0.77%
Russian	10,420	0.75%
Serbo-Croatian	5,845	0.42%
Ukrainian	12,680	0.91%
German	18,685	1.34%
Afrikaans	1,360	0.1%
Dutch	4,380	0.31%
Greek	1,545	0.11%
Bengali	3,865	0.28%
Gujarati	10,620	0.76%
Hindi	41,900	3%
Kacchi	1,110	0.08%
Marathi	1,470	0.11%
Nepali	2,500	0.18%
Punjabi	53,280	3.81%
Sinhala	2,105	0.15%
Urdu	16,575	1.19%
Pashto	1,155	0.08%
Dari	2,220	0.16%
Iranian; Persian	3,740	0.27%
Italian	8,095	0.58%
Portuguese	6,500	0.47%
Romanian	2,960	0.21%
Spanish	36,115	2.58%
Japanese	3,320	0.24%
Korean	8,020	0.57%
Akan (Twi)	1,660	0.12%
Igbo	1,295	0.09%
Kinyarwanda (Rwanda)	1,520	0.11%
Rundi (Kirundi)	1,060	0.08%
Shona	1,100	0.08%
Swahili	5,030	0.36%
Yoruba	3,230	0.23%
Mandarin	32,395	2.32%
Min Nan (Chaochow, Teochow, Fukien, Taiwanese)	1,685	0.12%
Cantonese	29,300	2.1%
Turkish	2,920	0.21%
Hungarian	1,805	0.13%
Total; Responses	1,397,750	98.56%
Total; Population	1,418,118	100%

== Religion ==
=== City of Edmonton ===
The 2021 National Household Survey identified 44.6% of Edmontonians as Christian, while 31.1% of residents were identified as having no religion.

Religion in Edmonton (2021)
1. Christian (44.6%)
2. No religion (36.4%)
3. Muslim (8.30%)
4. Sikh (4.20%)
5. Buddhist (1.50%)
6. Hindu (3.40%)
7. Jewish (0.40%)
8. Other (1.00%)
9. Indigenous Spirituality (0.20%)

Religion (2021)^{1}	Denomination	Congregation	Proportion^{2}
Christian		444,690	44.6%
	Catholic	208,905	21.0%
	Eastern Orthodox and Oriental Orthodox	23,445	2.4%
	United Church	22,375	2.2%
	Anglican Church	17,325	1.7%
	Pentecostal	14,500	1.5%
	Lutheran	13,840	1.4%
	Baptist	10,845	1.1%
	Latter Day Saints	5,030	0.5%
	Presbyterian	3,915	0.4%
	Jehovah's Witnesses	3,770	0.4%
	Reformed	2,600	0.3%
	Anabaptist	1,070	0.1%
	Other Christian traditions	25,235	2.5%
	Christian n.o.s.	90,430	9.1%
Muslim		83,015	8.3%
Sikh		41,385	4.2%
Buddhist		15,365	1.5%
Hindu		33,905	3.4%
Jewish		3,515	0.4%
Other Religions		9,965	1.0%
Aboriginal spirituality		1,995	0.2%
No religious affiliation		362,645	36.4%
Total		996,485	100%

^1 Statistics Canada. 2013. Alberta (Code 48) (table). National Household Survey (NHS) Profile. 2011 National Household Survey. Statistics Canada Catalogue no. 99-004-XWE. Ottawa. Released September 11, 2013.
^2 All percentages are rounded to nearest 0.1%.

=== Metro Edmonton ===
Largest non-Christian religion in Edmonton CMA by census tract based on the 2021 census

Religious groups in Metro Edmonton (1981−2021)
Religious group	2021		2011		2001		1991		1981	
Religious group	Pop.	%	Pop.	%	Pop.	%	Pop.	%	Pop.	%
Christianity	655,720	46.91%	673,165	59.07%	649,205	70.03%	623,155	74.88%	548,010	84.19%
Irreligion	539,075	38.57%	354,935	31.15%	218,905	23.61%	165,910	19.94%	81,675	12.55%
Islam	86,120	6.16%	46,125	4.05%	19,575	2.11%	14,815	1.78%	7,020	1.08%
Sikhism	44,440	3.18%	20,425	1.79%	9,405	1.01%	6,480	0.78%	2,730	0.42%
Hinduism	35,830	2.56%	15,615	1.37%	7,825	0.84%	5,815	0.7%	3,635	0.56%
Buddhism	16,470	1.18%	17,570	1.54%	14,045	1.52%	9,285	1.12%	1,980	0.3%
Judaism	3,820	0.27%	3,790	0.33%	3,980	0.43%	4,045	0.49%	4,245	0.65%
Indigenous spirituality	3,495	0.25%	2,375	0.21%	—N/a	—N/a	—N/a	—N/a	—N/a	—N/a
Other	12,785	0.91%	5,585	0.49%	4,075	0.44%	2,650	0.32%	975	0.15%
Total responses	1,397,750	98.56%	1,139,585	98.25%	927,020	98.85%	832,155	99.08%	650,895	99.06%
Total population	1,418,118	100%	1,159,869	100%	937,845	100%	839,924	100%	657,057	100%

== See also ==
- Demographics of Alberta
- Demographics of Calgary
- List of neighbourhoods in Edmonton
- List of oldest Edmontonians
