= List of oldest Edmontonians =

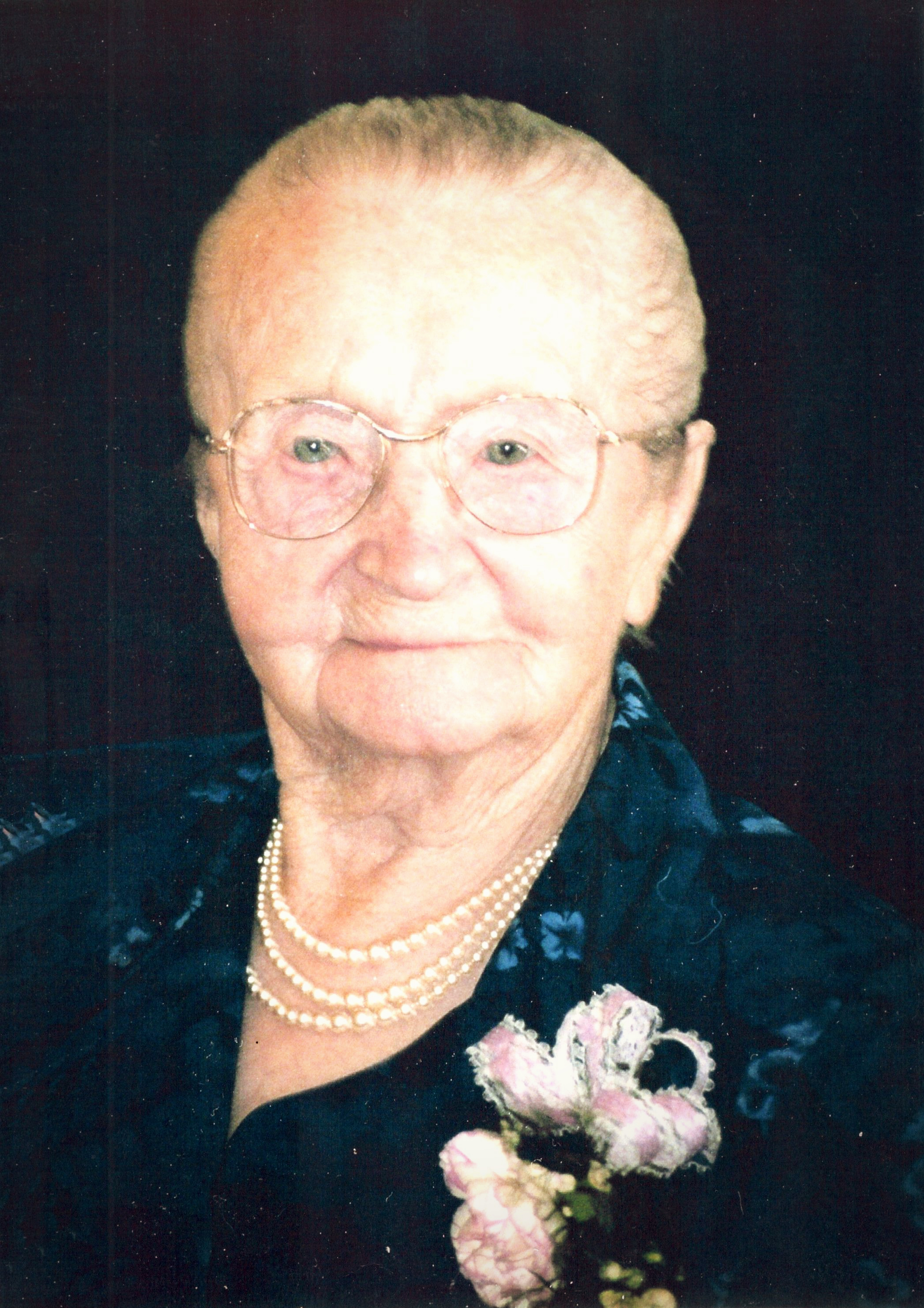
Aaltje Smit was the sixth oldest Edmontonian at the time of her death in 2005

This article lists the 25 oldest verified Edmontonians of all time (people from Edmonton, Alberta, all of whom attained the age of at least 105 years). Centenarians have received considerable local recognition in the City of Edmonton due to the Edmonton Aging Symposium, as well as the presence of the Alberta Centre on Aging at the University of Alberta. Edmonton's centenary focus is exemplified in the city's municipal slogan "Official Host City of the Turn of the Century" which was introduced in 1895, following the city's own centennial.

As of 2022, the oldest verified Edmontonian is Margherita Buttiri, who died aged 112 years and 46 days on 23 June 2020.

== Municipal recognition ==
The City of Edmonton honours citizens who become centenarians with a letter from the Mayor.

== Oldest verified Edmontonians ==
Deceased Living

| Rank | Name | Sex | Birth date | Death date | Age | Rank at death | Birthplace |
|---|---|---|---|---|---|---|---|
| 1 | Margherita Buttiri | F | 8 May 1908 | 23 June 2020 | 112 years, 46 days | 1 | Croatia |
| 2 | Irene Lantz | F | 2 March 1914 | 24 October 2025 | 111 years, 236 days | 1 | Canada |
| 3 | Katie Bunio | F | 30 October 1911 | 28 July 2021 | 109 years, 331 days | 1 | Canada |
| 4 | Bertha Robinson | F | 18 July 1913 | 27 May 2022 | 108 years, 323 days | 3 | Canada |
| 5 | Anna Marchuk | F | 25 April 1910 | 19 November 2018 | 108 years, 208 days | 1 | Canada |
| 6 | Janet McRae | F | 6 May 1908 | 14 September 2016 | 108 years, 132 days | 1 | Canada |
| 7 | Jean Babiuk | F | 6 September 1910 | 26 December 2018 | 108 years, 111 days | 3 | Canada |
| 8 | Mary Woywitka | F | 5 June 1911 | 19 June 2019 | 108 years, 14 days | 4 | Canada |
| 9 | Marjorie Beach | F | 4 May 1918 | 24 February 2026 | 108 years, 158 days | N/A | Canada |
| 10 | Albert Donnelly | M | 11 August 1888 | 21 April 1996 | 107 years, 254 days | 1 | Scotland |
| 11 | Gertrude Deane | F | 15 November 1908 | 22 June 2016 | 107 years, 220 days | 2 | Canada |
| 12 | Harold Dunichand | M | 31 July 1898 | 20 January 2006 | 107 years, 173 days | 1 | India |
| 13 | Kim Choy Yee Mah | F | 22 May 1904 | 23 October 2011 | 107 years, 154 days | 3 | China |
| 14 | Nykola Kos | M | 19 November 1897 | 19 February 2005 | 107 years, 92 days | 2 | Ukraine |
| 15 | Marie-Anne Morissette | F | 18 July 1888 | 2 September 1995 | 107 years, 46 days | 1 | Canada |
| 16 | Grace Gillies | F | 21 January 1910 | 18 February 2017 | 107 years, 28 days | 7 | Canada |
| 17 | Ellen McCullagh | F | 3 August 1903 | 6 June 2010 | 106 years, 307 days | 1 | Canada |
| 18 | John Garbencius | M | 17 January 1902 | 9 June 2008 | 106 years, 144 days | 5 | Lithuania |
| 19 | Thérèse Desjardins | F | 14 March 1918 | 4 December 2024 | 108 years, 209 days | 17 | Canada |
| 20 | Otho Hunter | M | 12 November 1886 | 22 February 1993 | 106 years, 102 days | 1 | United States |
| 21 | Martha Burgess | F | 18 April 1906 | 22 May 2012 | 106 years, 35 days | 9 | Canada |
| 22 | Tuo Bon Wong Mah | F | 19 November 1900 | 21 December 2006 | 106 years, 32 days | 5 | China |
| 23 | Dorothy Hollands | F | 23 January 1910 | 12 December 2015 | 105 years, 323 days | 14 | Canada |
| 24 | Helen Barber | F | 19 December 1906 | 28 October 2012 | 105 years, 314 days | 10 | Canada |
| 25 | Doris Patsula | F | 18 March 1907 | 19 October 2012 | 105 years, 216 days | 11 | Canada |

== See also ==
- Demographics of Edmonton
