= Airdrie, Alberta =

City in Alberta, Canada

Airdrie
- City
- City of Airdrie
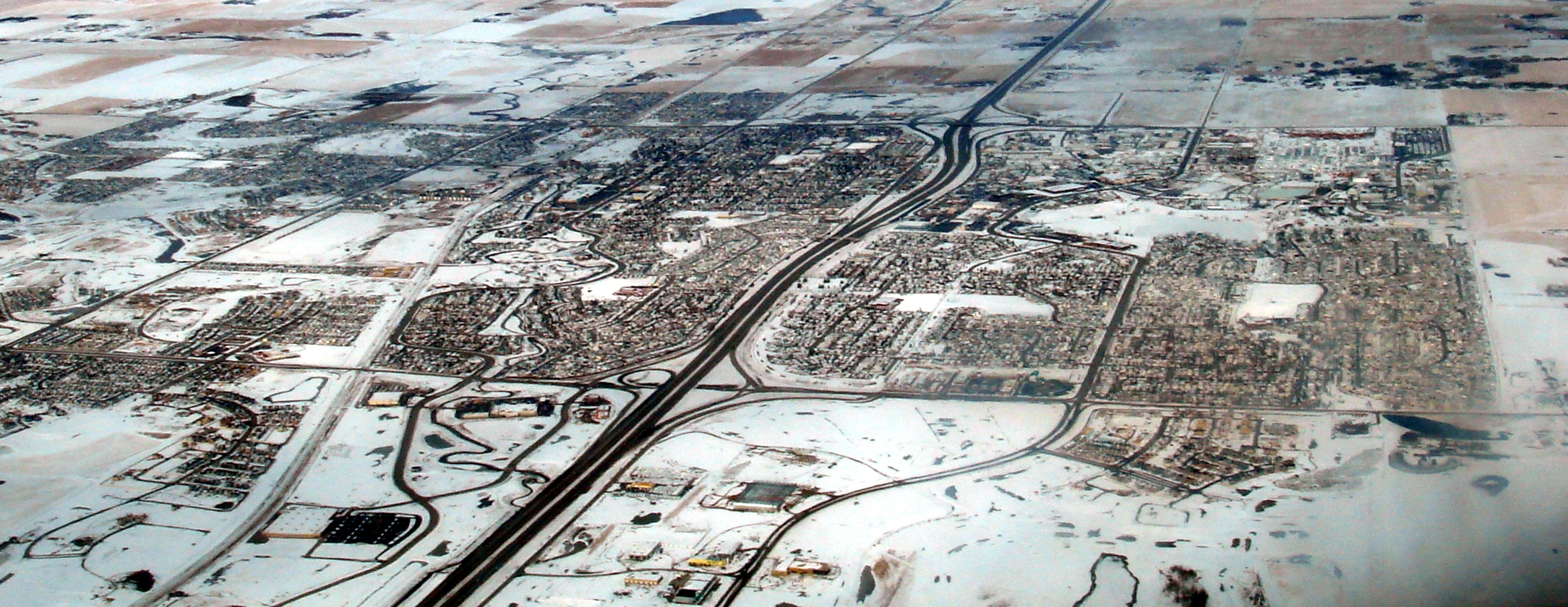
- Aerial view of Airdrie

- Flag Logo

- City boundaries

- Location in Alberta
- Coordinates: 51°17′30″N 114°00′52″W
- Country: Canada
- Province: Alberta
- Region: Calgary Metropolitan Region
- Municipal district: Rocky View County
- Founded: 1899
  - Village: September 10, 1909
  - Town: May 1, 1974
  - City: January 1, 1985

Government
  - Mayor: Heather Spearman
  - Governing body: Airdrie City Council: Ron Chapman; Chris Glass; Candice Kolson; Simisola Obasan; Kristen Shima; Chad Stewart
  - Manager: Horacio Galanti
  - MP: Blake Richards
  - MLA: Peter Guthrie; Angela Pitt

Area
  - Total: 86.03 km^{2} (33.22 sq mi)
  - Land: 84.39 km^{2} (32.58 sq mi)
- Elevation: 1,098 m (3,602 ft)

Population (2021)
  - Total: 74,100
  - Density: 878.1/km^{2} (2,274/sq mi)
  - Municipal census (2026): 93,957
- Demonym: Airdronian
- Time zone: UTC−6 (Alberta Time)
- Forward sortation areas: T4A - T4B
- Area codes: 403, 587, 825, 368
- Highways: 2, 567
- Website: airdrie.ca

Airdrie (/ˈɛərdri/ AIR-dree) is a city in Alberta, Canada, located north of Calgary within the Calgary–Edmonton Corridor at the intersection of Queen Elizabeth II Highway (Highway 2) and Highway 567. The city is part of the Calgary census metropolitan area and is surrounded by Rocky View County. Airdrie has a population of around 93,957 people, making it the fifth largest city in Alberta, after Calgary, Edmonton, Lethbridge, and Red Deer.

== History ==
Airdrie was first established in 1889 during the construction of the Calgary and Edmonton Railway, named for Airdrie, Scotland. Airdrie originated as a whistle stop for trains next to Nose Creek, allowing for easy replenishment of water for steam locomotives. Only railway buildings existed until 1901, when the first farmhouse and barn were built followed by a post office and store in that same year. The village of Airdrie was incorporated in 1909.

== Geography ==
The annexation of 12,640 acres of land by Airdrie from Rocky View County in 2012 is designed to accommodate anticipated growth until 2062. Airdrie's southern and Calgary's northern city boundaries are within a few kilometres of each other.

=== Neighbourhoods ===
Airdrie is divided into four civic addressing quadrants. As of 2023, the City of Airdrie recognized the following neighbourhoods, not including rural and annexation land.

- Airdrie Meadows
- Bayside/Baysprings/Bayview
- Big Springs
- Buffalo Rub
- Canals
- Chinook Gate
- Cobblestone Creek
- Coopers Crossing
- Davy Creek
- Downtown
- East Lake Industrial
- Edgewater
- Edmonton Trail
- Fairways
- Gateway Commercial
- Highland
- Hillcrest
- Jensen
- Key Ranch
- King's Heights
- Lanark
- Luxstone
- Meadowbrook
- Midtown
- Morningside
- Old Town
- Prairie Springs
- Ravenswood
- Reunion
- Reynolds
- Ridgegate
- Sagewood
- Sawgrass Park
- Sierra Springs Commercial
- Silver Creek
- South Pointe Commercial
- Southwinds
- Stonegate
- Summerhill
- Sun Ridge
- The Village
- Thorburn
- Vantage Rise
- Waterstone
- Wildflower
- Williamstown
- Willow Brook
- Windsong
- Woodside
- Yankee Valley Crossing
- Yankee Valley Estates

== Demographics ==
Federal census population history
Year	Pop.	±%
1911	164	—
1916	156	−4.9%
1921	160	+2.6%
1926	191	+19.4%
1931	198	+3.7%
1936	214	+8.1%
1941	191	−10.7%
1946	198	+3.7%
1951	267	+34.8%
1956	327	+22.5%
1961	524	+60.2%
1966	778	+48.5%
1971	1,089	+40.0%
1976	1,408	+29.3%
1981	8,414	+497.6%
1986	10,390	+23.5%
1991	12,456	+19.9%
1996	15,946	+28.0%
2001	20,382	+27.8%
2006	28,927	+41.9%
2011	42,564	+47.1%
2016	61,581	+44.7%
2021	74,100	+20.3%
Source: Statistics Canada

In its 2026 municipal census, the City of Airdrie counted its population as 93,957.

In the 2021 Census of Population conducted by Statistics Canada, the City of Airdrie had a population of 74,100 living in 26,050 of its 26,714 total private dwellings, a change of 20.3% from its 2016 population of 61,581. With a land area of 84.39 km^{2} (32.58 sq mi), it had a population density of 878.1/km^{2} (2,274/sq mi) in 2021.

=== Ethnicity ===
In 2021, 74.7% of residents were white/European, 20.4% were visible minorities and 4.9% were Indigenous.

Panethnic groups in the City of Airdrie (2001−2021)
Panethnic group	2021		2016		2011		2006		2001	
Panethnic group	Pop.	%	Pop.	%	Pop.	%	Pop.	%	Pop.	%
European (Note: Statistic includes all persons that did not make up part of a visible minority or an indigenous identity.)	55,110	74.68%	50,435	82.42%	37,050	87.63%	27,035	93.89%	19,320	95.36%
South Asian	3,825	5.18%	1,840	3.01%	680	1.61%	190	0.66%	80	0.39%
Indigenous	3,630	4.92%	2,855	4.67%	1,580	3.74%	870	3.02%	425	2.1%
African	3,530	4.78%	1,755	2.87%	745	1.76%	95	0.33%	130	0.64%
Southeast Asian (Note: Statistic includes total responses of "Filipino" and "Southeast Asian" under visible minority section on census.)	3,180	4.31%	1,725	2.82%	885	2.09%	135	0.47%	100	0.49%
Latin American	1,595	2.16%	825	1.35%	505	1.19%	50	0.17%	10	0.05%
East Asian (Note: Statistic includes total responses of "Chinese", "Korean", and "Japanese" under visible minority section on census.)	1,130	1.53%	890	1.45%	540	1.28%	330	1.15%	180	0.89%
Middle Eastern (Note: Statistic includes total responses of "West Asian" and "Arab" under visible minority section on census.)	980	1.33%	385	0.63%	60	0.14%	55	0.17%	20	0.1%
Other/multiracial (Note: Statistic includes total responses of "Visible minority, n.i.e." and "Multiple visible minorities" under visible minority section on census.)	810	1.1%	475	0.78%	235	0.56%	35	0.12%	0	0%
Total responses	73,795	99.59%	61,190	99.37%	42,280	97.71%	28,795	99.54%	20,260	99.28%
Total population	74,100	100%	61,581	100%	43,271	100%	28,927	100%	20,407	100%
Note: Totals greater than 100% due to multiple origin responses

=== Religion ===
In 2021, 46.8% of Airdrie residents were Christians, down from 62.1% in 2011. 18.4% were Catholic, 11.3% were Protestant, and 11.8% were Christian n.o.s. 5.3% were other Christian denominations or Christian-related traditions, including 1.3% Latter Day Saints believers. 45.9% were non-religious or secular, up from 35.5% in 2011. 7.2% of the population belonged to other religions, up from 2.3% in 2011. The largest non-Christian religions were Islam (3.0%), Sikhism (2.1%) and Hinduism (1.0%).

Religion	2021		2011	
Religion	Population	Percent	Population	Percent
Christian	34,555	46.8%	26,275	62.1%
No religion	33,880	45.9%	15,030	35.5%
Muslim	2,250	3.0%	315	0.7%
Sikh	1,515	2.1%	205	0.5%
Hindu	710	1.0%	60	0.1%
Buddhist	215	0.3%	140	0.3%
Jewish	70	0.1%	0	-
Other	590	0.8%	245	0.6%

=== Language ===
82.9% of residents spoke English as a mother tongue. Other common first languages were Tagalog (1.8%), French (1.8%), Spanish (1.8%), and Punjabi (1.6%). 2.3% of residents listed both English and a non-official language as their mother tongues, while 0.5% listed both English and French.

Mother tongue language (2021)
Language	Population	Pct (%)
English only	61,380	82.9%
French only	1,310	1.8%
Both English and French	390	0.5%
Other languages	9,050	12.2%

== Arts and culture ==
Nose Creek Regional Park hosts the annual Airdrie Festival of Lights during the Christmas season, usually lasting for the whole month of December. Other annual festivals include the Canada Day Parade and the Airdrie Pro Rodeo. Airdrie's primary cultural venues include the Nose Creek Valley Museum and the Bert Church Live Theatre. Bert Church Live Theatre hosts the Annual Airdrie Mayor's Night of the Arts.

Airdrie is also home to Airdrie CultureFest, which is an annual event that celebrates the city's diversity and culture. The city also hosts the Windwood Music Festival, featuring classical and contemporary music, in September.

== Attractions ==
Nose Creek Regional Park is located roughly in the centre of the city, just south of the downtown area, and is predominantly a natural prairie habitat area including wetlands. The park also features several sculptures, including the bronze sculpture Îethka Stoney Grandmother's Teachings, created by Don and Shirley Begg of Bronze Studio West in Cochrane, Alberta. It was donated to the city in 2023 by a local family and depicts a Stoney grandmother in 1909 teaching three of her grandchildren about uses of the local wolf willow. The first monument in Alberta to Philippine National Hero, José Rizal, which was inaugurated in October 2021, is also located in this park.

The Nose Creek Valley Museum is located south of Nose Creek park, along the city's Main Street.

The Korean War Gapyeong Battle Victory Monument is located in the Field of Valour Park in the city's Jensen neighbourhood.

- Bert Church Live Theatre
- Iron Horse Park
- Airdrie Festival of Lights
- Airdrie Pro Rodeo
- Airdrie Family Fall Fair

== Sports ==
Airdrie is the home of several sporting franchises. Major teams include the Knights of Airdrie, a senior men's lacrosse team that plays in the Rocky Mountain Lacrosse League. As well they have a Jr. B level hockey Team, the Airdrie Thunder, that competes in the Heritage Junior B Hockey League, and Team Airdrie, a Jr. C level hockey team that competes in the Calgary Jr. C Hockey League. They are also home to the CFR Chemical Bisons, a AAA Midget hockey team, playing out of the AMHL (Alberta AAA Midget Hockey League).

== Infrastructure ==
=== Transportation ===
Airdrie is situated on the Queen Elizabeth II Highway (Highway 2), which links Calgary and Edmonton. Highway 567 provides access to Cochrane to the west and Irricana to the east.

Airdrie is served by the Airdrie Airport, with the closest major airport being the Calgary International Airport.

Airdrie launched the InterCity Express (ICE) in the fall of 2010, connecting Airdrie and Calgary transit hubs by a two-way express bus service. Local bus service is provided by Airdrie Transit.

== Education ==
Rocky View Schools provides public education in Airdrie, and operates 18 schools in the city:

- A.E. Bowers Elementary School
- Bert Church High School
- C.W. Perry School
- Cooper's Crossing School
- Ecole Airdrie Middle School
- Ecole Edwards Elementary School
- George McDougall High School
- Heloise Lorimer School
- Heron's Crossing School
- Meadowbrook School
- Muriel Clayton Middle School
- Northcott Prairie School
- Nose Creek School
- R.J. Hawkey Elementary School
- Ralph McCall School
- RVS Community Learning Centre
- W.H. Croxford High School
- Windsong Heights School

The Calgary Catholic School District also operates four schools in Airdrie:

- St. Martin de Porres High School (8–12)
- Good Shepherd School (K–6)
- Our Lady Queen of Peace (K–9)
- St Veronica School (K–7)

Private schools in the city include Airdrie Koinonia Christian School, Footprints for Learning Academy and Atlas Academy.

Airdrie has one fully francophone school operated by the Conseil scolaire FrancoSud, L’École des Hautes-Plaines, which is a K-12 school.

== Media ==
Due to its proximity to Calgary, Airdrie receives radio and television broadcasts from the city (see Media of Calgary). It currently has no local television broadcasters but has a radio station, Air 106.1 FM and an accompanying community internet portal, DiscoverAirdrie.com.

The city has two local newspapers, the Airdrie City View, which is published by St. Albert-based Great West Media, as well as the Airdrie Echo which is affiliated with Postmedia. A community newsletter, Here's the Scoop, was also published weekly and delivered door to door as part of a larger flyer package throughout the city until July 2020, at which time it was purchased by Airdrie City View. A quarterly magazine, AirdrieLIFE, is also available.

== Sister cities ==
- Gwacheon, South Korea since 1997
- Airdrie, North Lanarkshire, Scotland

== Notable people ==
- Aaron Dell, National Hockey League goalie
- Kyle McKearney, singer-songwriter
- Grant McLean, former mayor
- Jake Neighbours, National Hockey League player
- Ty Rattie, former National Hockey League player
- Katie Rox, singer-songwriter

== See also ==
- List of communities in Alberta
- List of cities in Alberta
