= Municipal District of Acadia No. 34 =

Municipal district in Alberta, Canada

- Municipal district
- Logo

- Major communities

- Location within Alberta
- Country: Canada
- Province: Alberta
- Region: Southern Alberta
- Planning region: Red Deer
- Established: December 8, 1913
- Incorporated: 1945

Government
  - Reeve: Peter Rafa
  - Governing body: M.D. of Acadia Council
  - Administrative office: Acadia Valley

Area (2021)
  - Land: 1,070.92 km^{2} (413.48 sq mi)

Population (2021)
  - Total: 494
  - Density: 0.5/km^{2} (1.3/sq mi)
- Time zone: UTC−06:00 (Alberta Time)
- Website: mdacadia.ab.ca

The Municipal District of Acadia No. 34 is a municipal district (MD) in southern Alberta, Canada, east of Calgary, close to the Saskatchewan border, in Census Division No. 4.

It is located on Highway 41 on the north side of the Red Deer River and bordered on the east by Saskatchewan. Highway 41 is a main route between Medicine Hat and Cold Lake.

== Geography ==
=== Communities and localities ===
The following urban municipalities are surrounded by the municipal district of Acadia No. 34.

- Acadia Valley

The following localities are located within the municipal district of Acadia No. 34.

- Acadia
- Arneson
- Haven

== Demographics ==
Federal census population history
Year	Pop.	±%
1916	897	—
1921	1,144	+27.5%
1926	841	−26.5%
1931	1,029	+22.4%
1936	826	−19.7%
1941	748	−9.4%
1946	682	−8.8%
1951	705	+3.4%
1956	914	+29.6%
1961	965	+5.6%
1966	896	−7.2%
1971	691	−22.9%
1976	651	−5.8%
1981	604	−7.2%
1986	618	+2.3%
1991	522	−15.5%
1996	533	+2.1%
2001	512	−3.9%
2006	545	+6.4%
2011	495	−9.2%
2016	493	−0.4%
Source: Statistics Canada

In the 2021 Census of Population conducted by Statistics Canada, the municipal district of Acadia No. 34 had a population of 494 living in 159 of its 196 total private dwellings, a change of 0.2% from its 2016 population of 493. With a land area of 1,070.92 km^{2} (413.48 sq mi), it had a population density of 0.5/km^{2} (1.2/sq mi) in 2021.

In the 2016 Census of Population conducted by Statistics Canada, the municipal district of Acadia No. 34 had a population of 493 living in 159 of its 184 total private dwellings, a −0.4% change from its 2011 population of 495. With a land area of 1,082.6 km^{2} (418.0 sq mi), it had a population density of 0.5/km^{2} (1.2/sq mi) in 2016.

== Attractions ==
- Prairie Elevator Museum in the Hamlet of Acadia Valley
- Acadia Municipal Recreation Dam - trout fishing

== History ==
The original settlers of the municipal district came from Broderick, Saskatchewan in 1909. When they came to the area they settled by Red Deer River. Other people from Calgary came to settle the area of the frontier. After many more settlers arrived a petition was voted on to establish a local government. The petition was sent to the provincial government in Edmonton, where on December 8, 1913, the Rural Municipality of Acadia No. 241 (renamed to its current name a month later) was formed.

During the 1930s, the Western Canada, and Alberta were hit hard by the drought and many failing municipalities were amalgamated into Improvement Districts and Special Areas, most of which still exist today. However, Acadia fought hard against its amalgamation and for its own municipal independence, which it succeeded in getting, making them one of the only counties in the region to do so. In 1932, the United Farmers government issued a drought relief measure to ease the dire situation in that region. Soon after this, rains came again and that part of Western Canada recovered.

== See also ==
- List of communities in Alberta
- List of municipal districts in Alberta
