= Loverna =

Community in Saskatchewan, Canada

Coordinates: 51.66°N 109.99°W

Loverna is an unincorporated hamlet in the Rural Municipality of Antelope Park No. 322, Saskatchewan, Canada. The population of Loverna was 5 at the 2001 Canada Census. The hamlet is approximately 50 kilometres (31 mi) northwest of the town of Kindersley at the intersection of Highway 772 and Range Road 290. The Grand Trunk Pacific played a big role in the town's economy when it was completed in 1913 on its way from Biggar, Saskatchewan, to Hemaruka, Alberta. The line was planned as a thorough route, however the planned connection to another line under construction at the time to Sponin, Alberta, was never finished. The track was lightly built and poorly maintained and so could only support boxcars and lightweight hopper cars for grain loading. As well the line was restricted to special lightweight GMD-1 locomotives. During the drastic closure of uneconomic branch lines in the late 1970s and '80s the tracks west from Smiley through Loverna were closed. The Canadian Pacific Railway took over operation of the remaining track from a connection on their line at Dodsland to Smiley. This too was closed in 1996, and Loverna's population has since declined.

== History ==
Prior to March 10, 2003, Loverna was incorporated under village status, but was restructured as a hamlet under the jurisdiction of the RM of Antelope Park No. 322 on that date.

== Demographics ==
Federal census population history
Year	Pop.	±%
1916	144	—
1921	202	+40.3%
1926	221	+9.4%
1931	210	−5.0%
1936	175	−16.7%
1941	156	−10.9%
1946	124	−20.5%
1951	131	+5.6%
1956	129	−1.5%
1961	145	+12.4%
1966	75	−48.3%
1971	55	−26.7%
1976	56	+1.8%
1981	37	−33.9%
1986		—
1991		—
1996	12	—
2001	5	−58.3%
Source: Statistics Canada

In the 2021 Census of Population conducted by Statistics Canada, Loverna had a population of 5 living in 4 of its 7 total private dwellings, a change of 0% from its 2016 population of 5. With a land area of 0.64 km^{2} (0.25 sq mi), it had a population density of 7.8/km^{2} (20.2/sq mi) in 2021.

== See also ==
- List of communities in Saskatchewan
- List of hamlets in Saskatchewan
