= Theodore, Saskatchewan =

Village in Saskatchewan, Canada

Theodore
- Village
- Village of Theodore
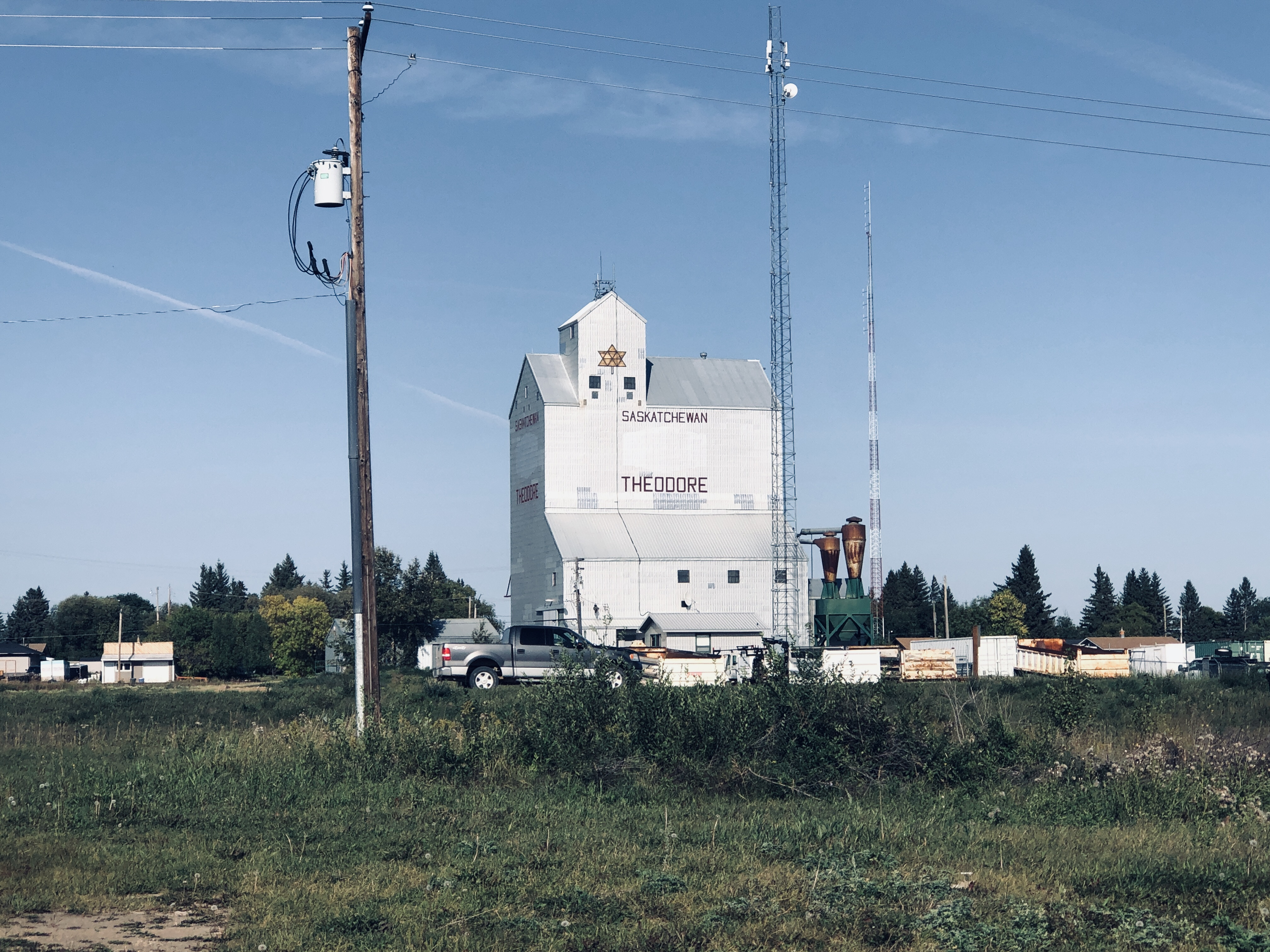
- Grain elevator in Theodore

- Location of Theodore in Saskatchewan Theodore (Canada)
- Coordinates: 51°25′30″N 102°55′15″W
- Country: Canada
- Province: Saskatchewan
- Rural Municipalities (RM): Insinger No. 275
- Post office founded: 1893-12-01
- Incorporated: 1907

Government
  - Mayor: Roger Hardie
  - MP for Yorkton—Melville: Cathay Wagantall (CON)
  - MLA for Canora-Pelly: Sean Wilson (SP)

Area
  - Land: 1.51 km^{2} (0.58 sq mi)

Population (2021)
  - Total: 315
  - Density: 208.4/km^{2} (540/sq mi)
- Time zone: UTC-6 (Central Standard Time)
- Postal code: S0A 4C0
- Area code(s): 306, 639 and 474
- Website: www.villageoftheodore.com

Theodore (2021 population: 315) is a village in the Canadian province of Saskatchewan within the Rural Municipality of Insinger No. 275 and Census Division No. 9. Theodore is located on the Yellowhead Highway in southeastern Saskatchewan between Yorkton and Foam Lake. The Theodore post office first opened in 1893 by a German industrialist, Richard John Earnest Seeman, who brought immigrants from Europe and started the town at the legal land description of Sec.1, Twp.28, R.7, W2. Seeman named the town Theodore after his father. In 1894, Seeman moved to Yorkton with his wife (but she did not stay long) according to author Guilherme de Albuquerque d’Orey in an essay he wrote in the early 2020s.

With the end of passenger rail service in 1974, the Theodore railway station was adopted for use as a senior citizens' centre; it also serves as the home for the Theodore Historical Museum.

Theodore Reservoir and Whitesand Regional Park are about 10 kilometres (6.2 mi) north-east of Theodore.

The village contains a Co-op, a fire department, an old-age home, a motel, a butcher shop, a variety store, a Canada Post outlet, a kindergarten to 8th grade Catholic school and a former CPR train station.

== History ==
Theodore incorporated as a village on July 5, 1907.

== Demographics ==
Historical census populations – Theodore, Saskatchewan

Year	Pop.	±%
1911	193	—
1916	246	+27.5%
1921	287	+16.7%
1926	304	+5.9%
1931	371	+22.0%
1936	346	−6.7%
1941	335	−3.2%
1946	329	−1.8%

Year	Pop.	±%
1951	403	+22.5%
1956	418	+3.7%
1961	455	+8.9%
1966	489	+7.5%
1971	463	−5.3%
1976	472	+1.9%
1981	473	+0.2%
1986	472	−0.2%

Year	Pop.	±%
1991	473	+0.2%
1996	434	−8.2%
2001	381	−12.2%
2006	339	−11.0%
2011	345	+1.8%
2016	323	−6.4%
2021	315	−2.5%

Source: Statistics Canada via Saskatchewan Bureau of Statistics

In the 2021 Census of Population conducted by Statistics Canada, Theodore had a population of 315 living in 151 of its 173 total private dwellings, a change of −2.5% from its 2016 population of 323. With a land area of 1.51 km^{2} (0.58 sq mi), it had a population density of 208.6/km^{2} (540.3/sq mi) in 2021.

In the 2016 Census of Population, the Village of Theodore recorded a population of 323 living in 167 of its 211 total private dwellings, a −6.8% change from its 2011 population of 345. With a land area of 1.73 km^{2} (0.67 sq mi), it had a population density of 186.7/km^{2} (483.6/sq mi) in 2016.

== Gallery ==
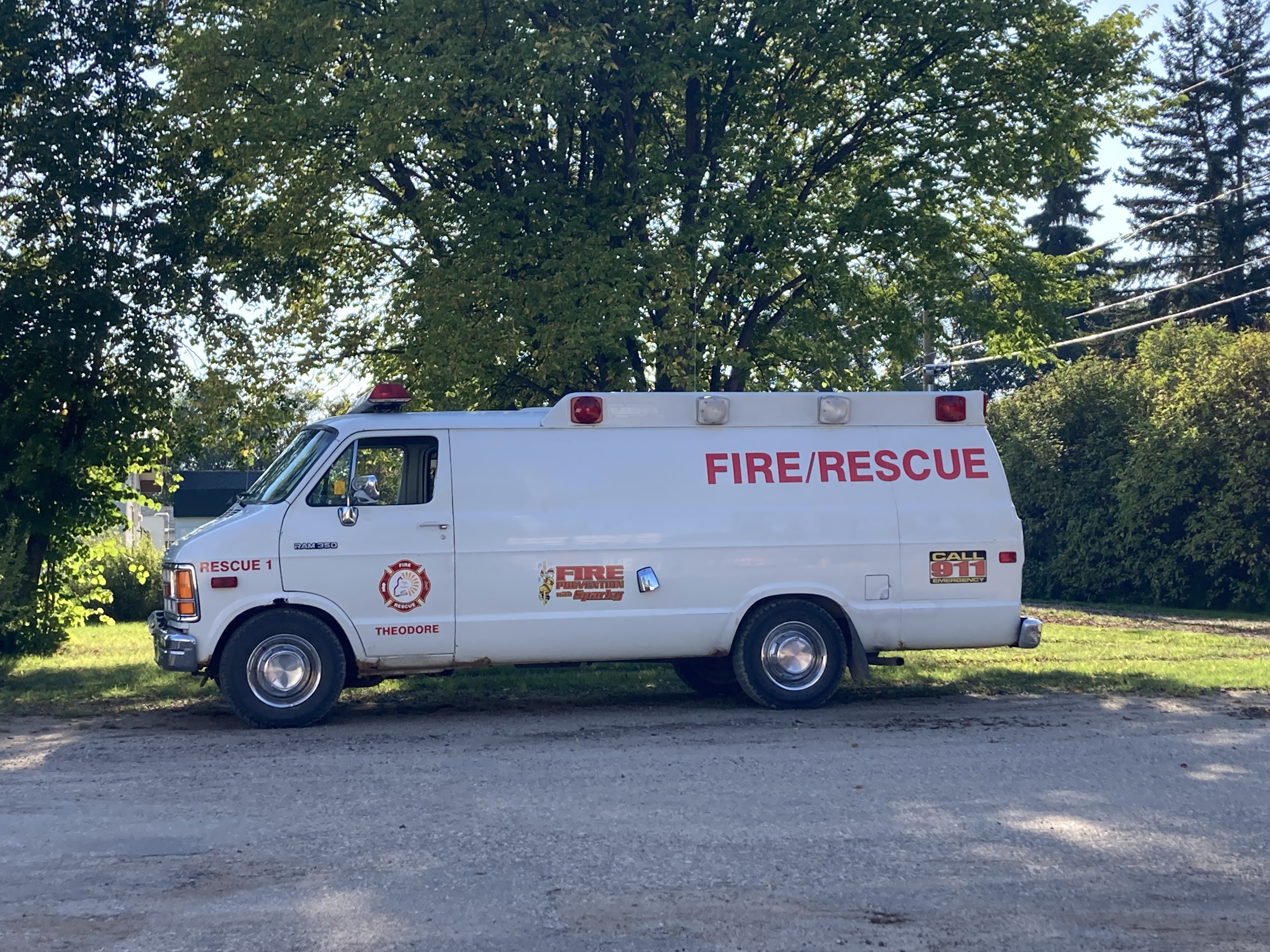
Fire/rescue van in Theodore

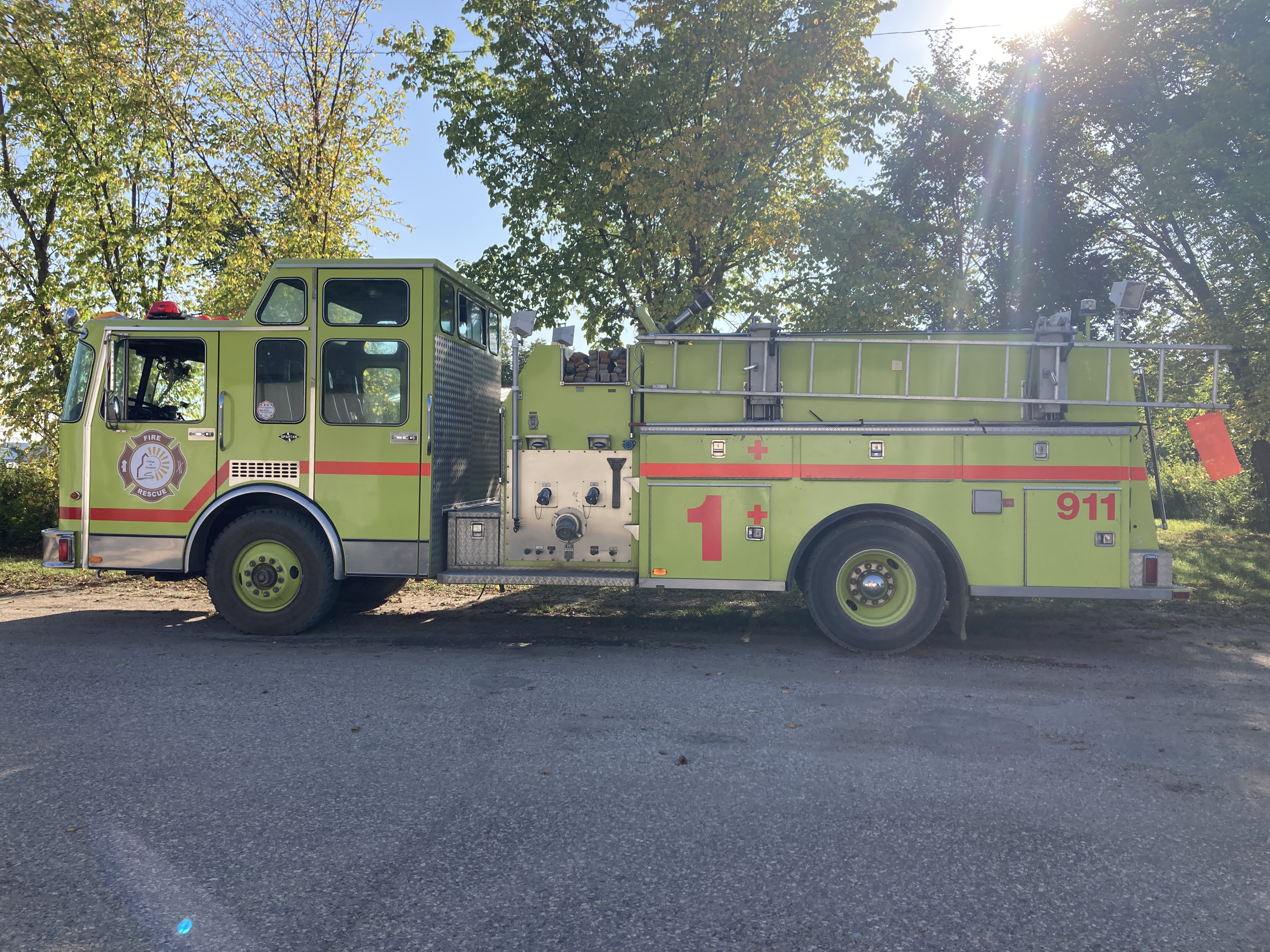
Fire truck in Theodore

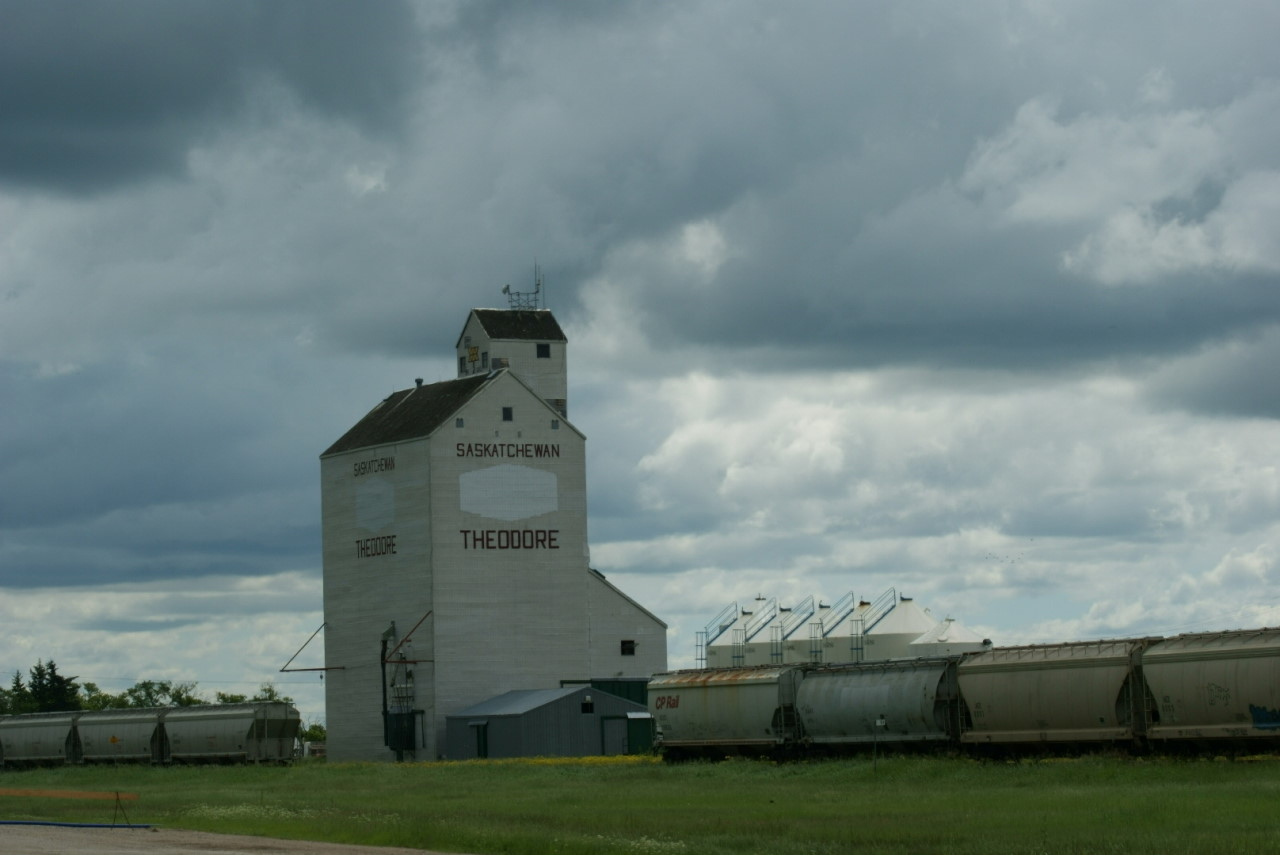
Grain elevator in Theodore

== Transportation ==
Theodore today is serviced by the Canadian Pacific Railway as well as Highway 651, Highway 726 and Highway 16 (Yellowhead Highway). Theodore also used to be served by the now-defunct Saskatchewan Transportation Company, a bus line between Yorkton and Saskatoon.

== See also ==
- List of communities in Saskatchewan
