= Maple Creek, Saskatchewan =

Town in Saskatchewan, Canada

Maple Creek
- Town
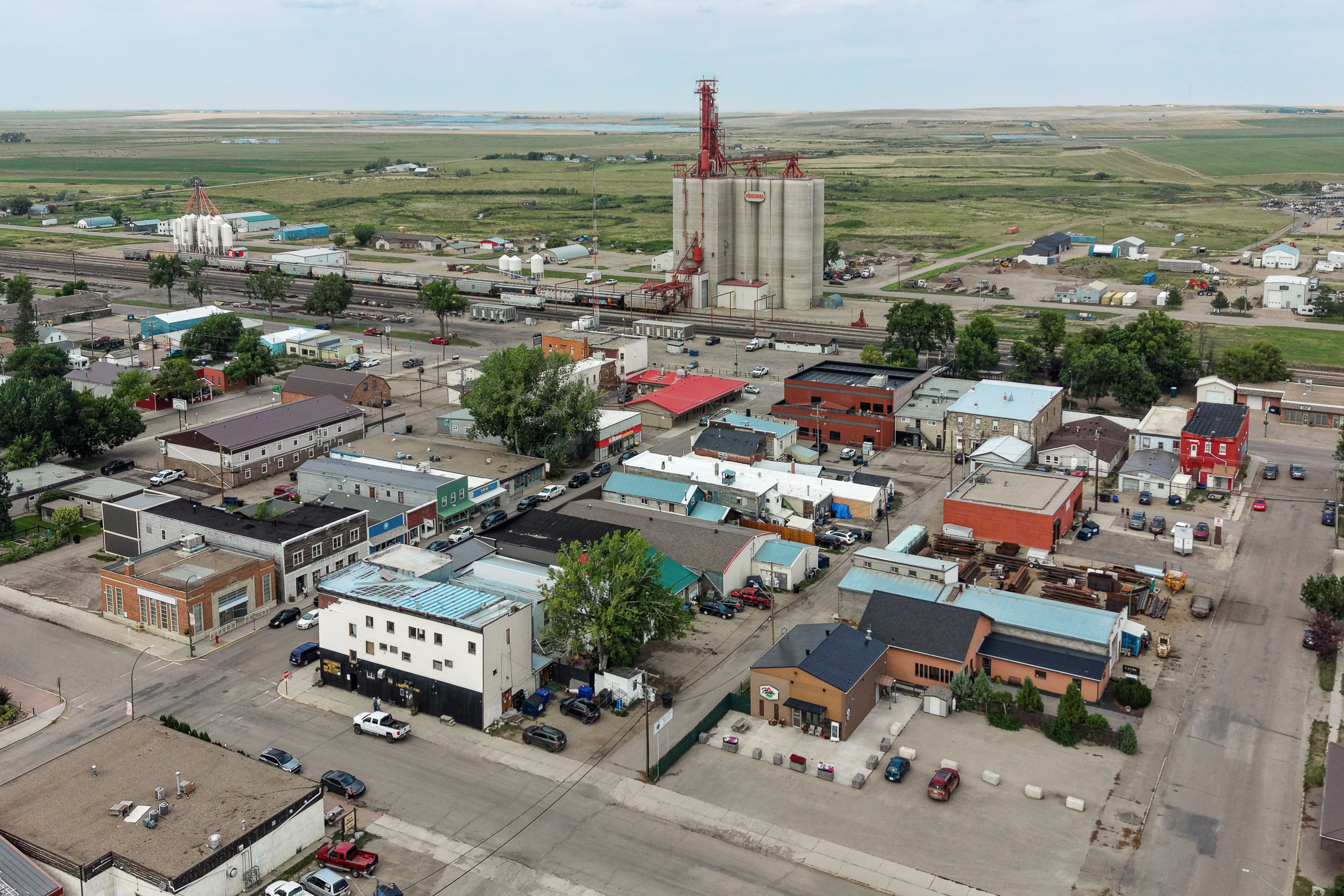
- Aerial view of downtown (2026)
- Motto: "Where Past Is Present"
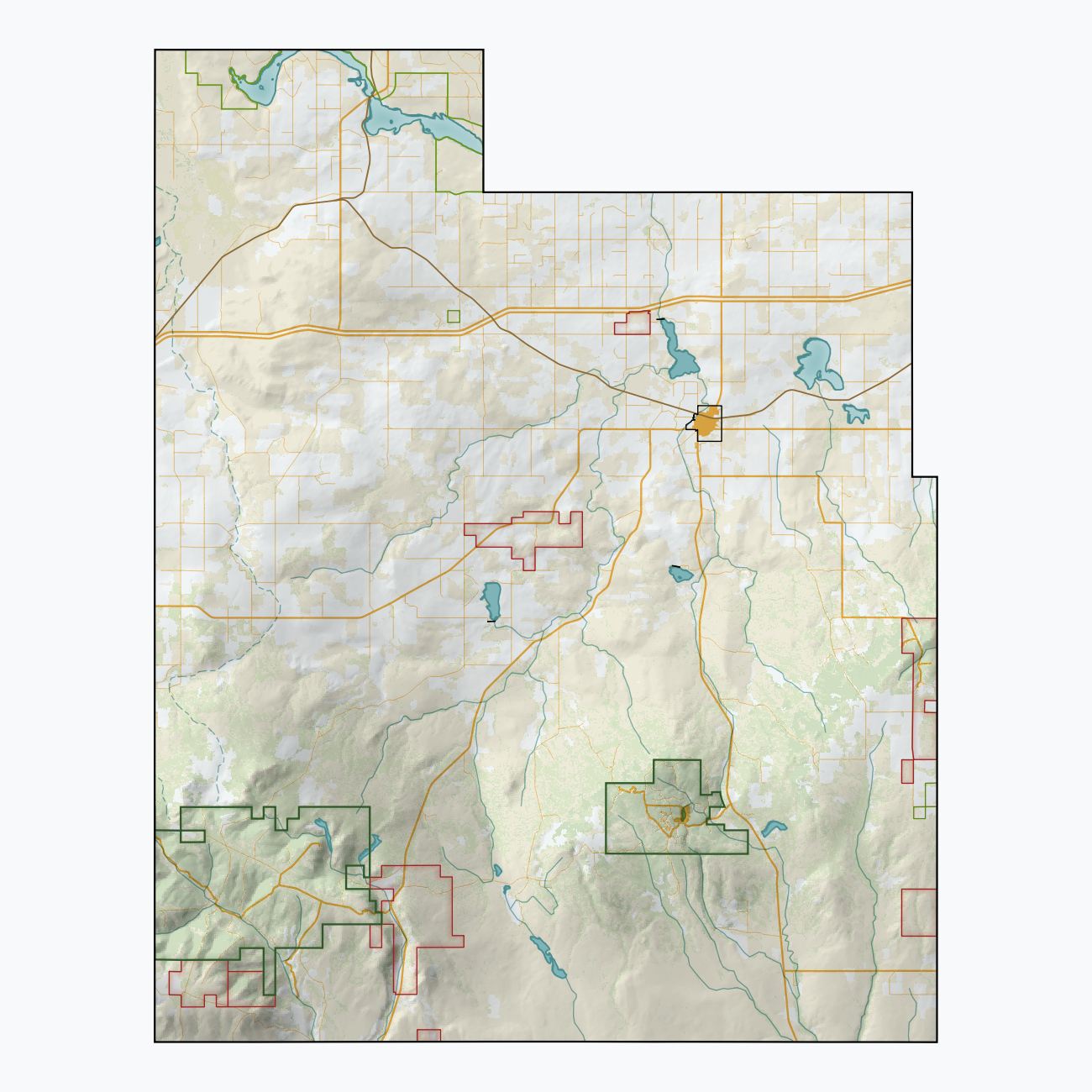
- Location within Saskatchewan Location within Maple Creek No. 111
- Coordinates: 49°54′08″N 109°29′10″W
- Country: Canada
- Province: Saskatchewan
- Rural municipality: Maple Creek
- Established: 1883
- Incorporated (village): 1896
- Incorporated (town): April 30, 1903

Government
  - Mayor: Michelle McKenzie
  - Town manager: Barry Elliott, CAO
  - Governing body: Maple Creek Town Council
  - MP: Jeremy Patzer
  - MLA: Doug Steele

Area (2021)
  - Land: 4.35 km^{2} (1.68 sq mi)
  - Population Centre: 1.57 km^{2} (0.61 sq mi)

Population (2021)
  - Total: 2,176
  - Density: 500/km^{2} (1,300/sq mi)
  - Population centre: 2,151
  - Population centre density: 1,372.4/km^{2} (3,554/sq mi)
- Time zone: UTC−06:00 (CST)
- Postal code: S0N 1N0
- Area code: 306
- Highways: Highway 21; Highway 271; Highway 724
- Railways: Canadian Pacific
- Climate: BSk
- Website: maplecreek.ca

Maple Creek is a town in the Cypress Hills of southwest Saskatchewan, Canada. It is surrounded by the Rural Municipality of Maple Creek No. 111. The population was 2,176 at the 2021 Census.

The town is 103 km (64 mi) southeast of Medicine Hat, Alberta, and 40 km (25 mi) north of the Cypress Hills Interprovincial Park on Highway 21 and 8 km (5.0 mi) south of the Trans-Canada Highway. Maple Creek runs along the west side of town.

== History ==
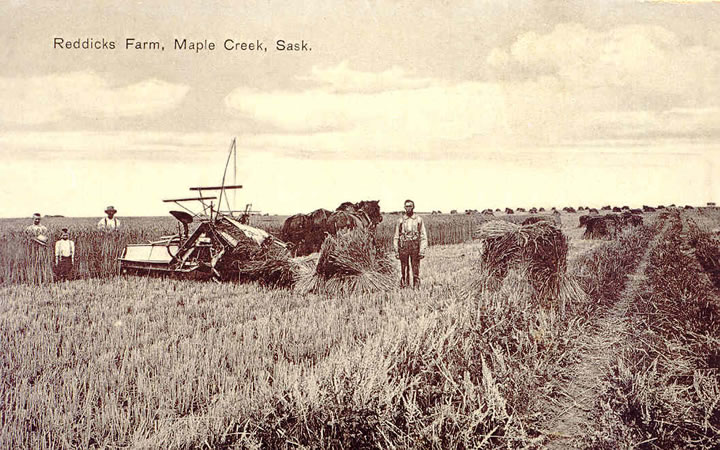
Reddicks Farm, Maple Creek (1920s)

After the North-West Mounted Police had been established at Fort Walsh, settlers began to explore the Cypress Hills area, living along the creeks and doing small-scale ranching. The Department of the Interior was operating a First Nations farm on the Maple Creek, a few miles south from the present town site. In 1882-1883 the First Nations (mainly Cree, Saulteaux, and Assiniboine) were moved to Qu'Appelle, and the farm was then operated by Major Shurtleff, a former Royal Canadian Mounted Police, and George Wood, his brother-in-law.

In the winter of 1882, a Canadian Pacific Railway construction crew of 12 decided to winter where the town of Maple Creek now stands. This marked the establishment of Maple Creek.

In June 2010, a flood submerged some of the town when Maple Creek overflowed its banks. The same flood hit much of southwestern Saskatchewan and southern Alberta and even destroyed a portion of the Trans-Canada Highway.

=== Heritage sites ===
There are two designated municipal heritage Properties in Maple Creek:

- The W. R. Orr Heritage Building was constructed in 1910 and over its history it has housed the Union Bank of Canada; W.R. Orr Law Office; Royal Bank of Canada; Bank of Montreal; Burnett & Orr Law Office.
- The St. Mary's Anglican Church was constructed in 1909 in the Romanesque style. The church also contains a vestry, narthex, and octagonal belfry with steeple that was added in 1928.

== Demographics ==
Federal census population history
Year	Pop.	±%
1901	382	—
1906	687	+79.8%
1911	936	+36.2%
1916	1,140	+21.8%
1921	1,002	−12.1%
1926	930	−7.2%
1931	1,154	+24.1%
1936	1,032	−10.6%
1941	1,085	+5.1%
1946	1,280	+18.0%
1951	1,638	+28.0%
1956	1,974	+20.5%
1961	2,291	+16.1%
1966	2,359	+3.0%
1971	2,268	−3.9%
1976	2,330	+2.7%
1981	2,470	+6.0%
1986	2,452	−0.7%
1991	2,334	−4.8%
1996	2,307	−1.2%
2001	2,270	−1.6%
2006	2,198	−3.2%
2011	2,176	−1.0%
2016	2,084	−4.2%
2021	2,176	+4.4%
Source: Statistics Canada

In the 2021 Canadian census conducted by Statistics Canada, Maple Creek had a population of 2,176 living in 988 of its 1,083 total private dwellings, a change of 4.4% from its 2016 population of 2,084. With a land area of 4.35 km^{2} (1.68 sq mi), it had a population density of 500.2/km^{2} (1,295.6/sq mi) in 2021.

Canada census – Maple Creek community profile

	2021	2016	2011
Population	2,176 (+4.4% from 2016)	2,084 (-4.2% from 2011)	2,176 (-1.0% from 2006)
Land area	4.35 km^{2} (1.68 sq mi)	4.42 km^{2} (1.71 sq mi)	4.42 km^{2} (1.71 sq mi)
Population density	500/km^{2} (1,300/sq mi)	471.3/km^{2} (1,221/sq mi)	492.1/km^{2} (1,275/sq mi)
Median age	46.8 (M: 45.2, F: 48.0)		46.5 (M: 46.4, F: 46.6)
Private dwellings	1,083 (total) 988 (occupied)	1,070 (total)	1,028 (total)
Median household income	$65,500

References: 2021 2016 2011

Population by ethnic origin, 2021 (Note: The sum of the ancestries in this table is greater than the total population estimate because a person may report more than one ancestry (ethnic origin))
Ethnic group	Population	Percent
First Nations (North American Indian)	90	4.02%
Métis	70	3.13%
Multiple Indigenous responses	15	0.7%
South Asian	35	1.6%
Chinese	35	1.6%
Filipino	70	3.1%
European	1,960	87.5%
Totals	2,240	100%

== Climate ==
Maple Creek experiences a semi-arid climate (Köppen climate classification BSk). With the exception of southwestern Alberta, winters in Maple Creek are typically warmer than those in the adjacent plain region of southern Alberta and Saskatchewan, being a convergence point for Chinook winds originating along the Rocky Mountain Front.

The highest temperature ever recorded in Maple Creek was 43.3 °C (109.9 °F) on August 5, 1961. The coldest temperature ever recorded was −46.7 °C (−52.1 °F) on February 15 and 16, 1936.

Climate data for Maple Creek WMO ID: 71453; coordinates 49°54′09″N 109°27′58″W; elevation: 766.7 m (2,515 ft); 1991–2020 normals, (Note: Precipitation (including rain and snow) and days with precipitation are from the 1981–2010 normals) extremes 1921–present (Note: Extreme high and low temperatures in the table below were recorded at Maple Creek from July 1921 to June 1967, at Maple Creek North from July 1967 to November 2007 and at Maple Creek from December 2007 to present.)
Month	Jan	Feb	Mar	Apr	May	Jun	Jul	Aug	Sep	Oct	Nov	Dec	Year
Record high humidex	18.3	18.4	22.7	29.5	33.8	41.0	40.6	39.9	35.1	29.3	23.5	15.9	41.0
Record high °C (°F)	18.4 (65.1)	18.9 (66.0)	22.8 (73.0)	29.5 (85.1)	32.2 (90.0)	35.9 (96.6)	38.8 (101.8)	43.3 (109.9)	35.2 (95.4)	28.7 (83.7)	23.9 (75.0)	16.0 (60.8)	43.3 (109.9)
Mean daily maximum °C (°F)	−1.8 (28.8)	−0.8 (30.6)	5.2 (41.4)	12.5 (54.5)	18.1 (64.6)	22.1 (71.8)	27.1 (80.8)	26.5 (79.7)	20.6 (69.1)	12.6 (54.7)	4.7 (40.5)	−1.0 (30.2)	12.2 (54.0)
Daily mean °C (°F)	−8.3 (17.1)	−7.3 (18.9)	−1.2 (29.8)	5.3 (41.5)	10.8 (51.4)	15.2 (59.4)	19.2 (66.6)	18.3 (64.9)	13.0 (55.4)	5.7 (42.3)	−1.7 (28.9)	−7.3 (18.9)	5.1 (41.2)
Mean daily minimum °C (°F)	−14.8 (5.4)	−13.8 (7.2)	−7.6 (18.3)	−1.9 (28.6)	3.3 (37.9)	8.2 (46.8)	11.2 (52.2)	10.1 (50.2)	5.2 (41.4)	−1.3 (29.7)	−8.0 (17.6)	−13.5 (7.7)	−1.9 (28.6)
Record low °C (°F)	−40.4 (−40.7)	−46.7 (−52.1)	−36.1 (−33.0)	−19.0 (−2.2)	−11.1 (12.0)	−3.5 (25.7)	2.2 (36.0)	−1.9 (28.6)	−7.0 (19.4)	−20.2 (−4.4)	−33.9 (−29.0)	−40.8 (−41.4)	−46.7 (−52.1)
Record low wind chill	−46.5	−51.8	−42.9	−25.3	−14.1	−3.5	0.0	−4.8	−10.4	−26.3	−38.8	−48.0	−51.8
Average precipitation mm (inches)	18.1 (0.71)	13.1 (0.52)	22.2 (0.87)	25.0 (0.98)	47.1 (1.85)	76.5 (3.01)	45.9 (1.81)	43.4 (1.71)	36.3 (1.43)	23.9 (0.94)	19.0 (0.75)	17.6 (0.69)	388.1 (15.28)
Average rainfall mm (inches)	1.4 (0.06)	0.7 (0.03)	5.7 (0.22)	18.4 (0.72)	41.8 (1.65)	76.5 (3.01)	45.9 (1.81)	43.0 (1.69)	34.9 (1.37)	16.0 (0.63)	2.6 (0.10)	0.9 (0.04)	287.6 (11.32)
Average snowfall cm (inches)	16.7 (6.6)	12.3 (4.8)	16.6 (6.5)	6.6 (2.6)	5.4 (2.1)	0.0 (0.0)	0.0 (0.0)	0.4 (0.2)	1.5 (0.6)	7.9 (3.1)	16.4 (6.5)	16.7 (6.6)	100.5 (39.6)
Average precipitation days (≥ 0.2 mm)	7.2	6.2	7.9	7.1	11.3	13.0	9.3	9.0	9.0	6.8	6.8	8.4	102.0
Average rainy days (≥ 0.2 mm)	0.7	0.46	2.4	5.5	11	13	9.3	9.0	8.9	5.3	1.7	0.77	67.9
Average snowy days (≥ 0.2 cm)	6.8	5.8	6.0	2.3	1.2	0.0	0.0	0.07	0.59	2.0	5.5	7.8	38.0
Average relative humidity (%) (at 1500 LST)	67.8	65.1	56.0	44.2	44.3	49.1	39.1	37.4	42.0	49.0	60.4	67.5	51.8
Source: Environment and Climate Change Canada (precipitation) (February minimum) (August maximum)

== Education ==
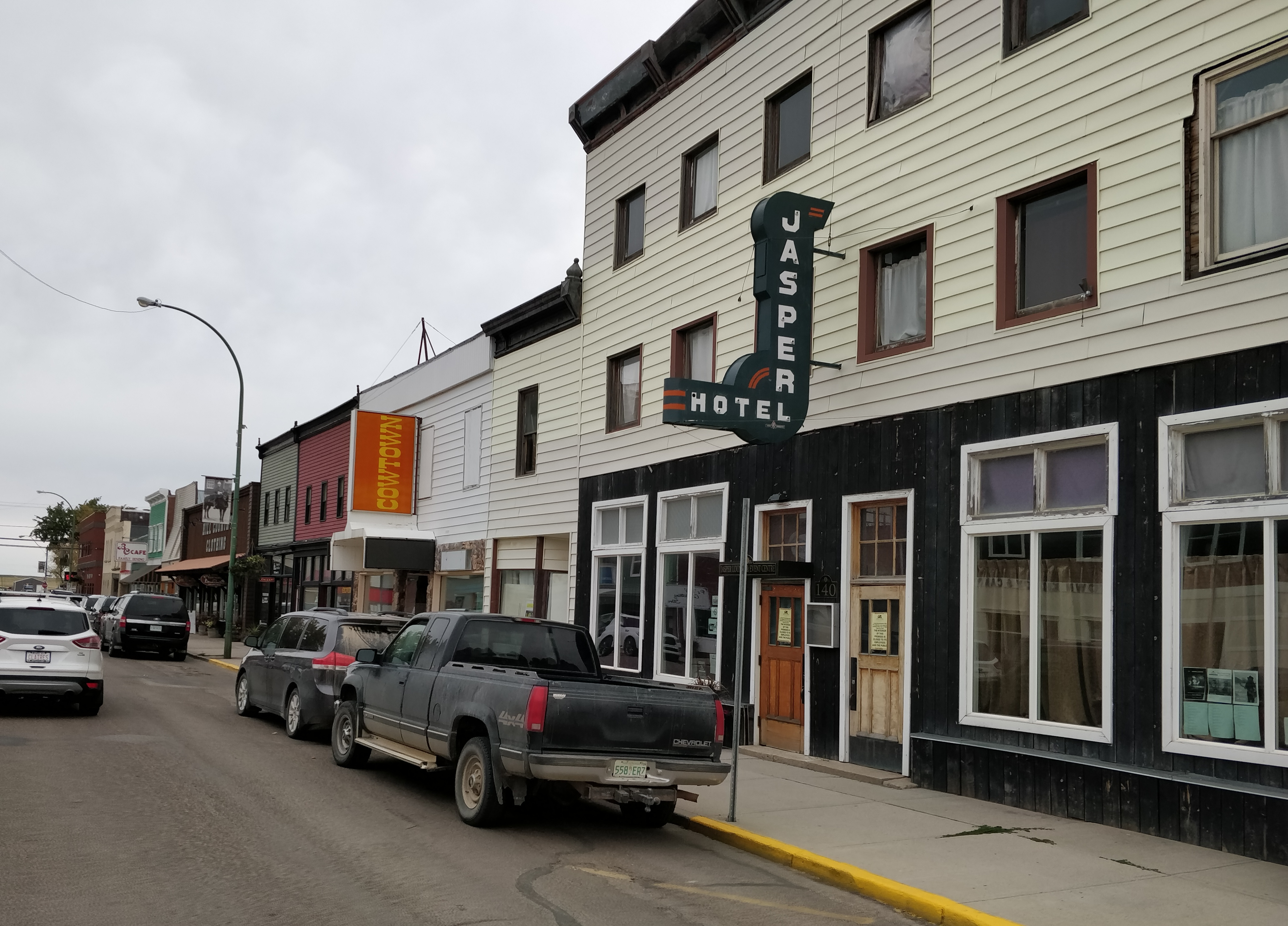
The Jasper Hotel on Jasper Street

The Sidney Street School and the Maple Creek Composite School serve the local community.

Great Plains College operates a satellite campus in Maple Creek.

== Notable people ==
- Cheryl Bawtinheimer – Canadian activist, media producer, and whistleblower; former member and prominent critic of the Plymouth Brethren Christian Church.
- Stuart John Cameron, member of the Legislative Assembly of Saskatchewan for Regina South
- Barry Dean, former National Hockey League (NHL) player
- Quick Dick McDick (Dickson Delorme), YouTuber, farmer, comedian
- Gordon Poirier, former NHL player
- Zack Smith, former NHL player

== See also ==
- Maple Creek Airport
- List of communities in Saskatchewan
- List of towns in Saskatchewan
