= Red Deer, Alberta =

City in Alberta, Canada

Red Deer
- City
- City of Red Deer
- Skyline of Red Deer Canadian Pacific Railway station Red Deer River

- Flag Coat of arms Logo
- Motto: Education, Industry and Progress
- City boundaries

- Location in Alberta Location in Canada Location in Red Deer County
- Coordinates: 52°16′05″N 113°48′40″W
- Country: Canada
- Province: Alberta
- Planning region: Red Deer
- Municipal district: Red Deer County
- Founded: 1882
  - Village: May 31, 1894
  - Town: June 12, 1901
  - City: March 25, 1913
- Named for: Red Deer River

Government
  - Mayor: Cindy Jefferies
  - Governing body: Red Deer City Council: Kraymer Barnstable; Tristin Brisbois; Bruce Buruma; Cassandra Curtis; Adam Goodwin; Cindy Jeffries; Chad Krahn; Jaelene Tweelde; Dianne Wyntjes
  - City Manager: Tara Lodewyk
  - MPs: Burton Bailey (C)
  - MLAs: Jason Stephan (UCP); Adriana LaGrange (UCP)

Area (2021)
  - Land: 104.34 km^{2} (40.29 sq mi)
  - Urban: 65.93 km^{2} (25.46 sq mi)
  - Metro: 104.34 km^{2} (40.29 sq mi)
- Elevation: 855 m (2,805 ft)

Population (2021)
  - City: 100,844
  - Density: 966.5/km^{2} (2,503/sq mi)
  - Urban: 99,846
  - Urban density: 1,514.4/km^{2} (3,922/sq mi)
  - Metro: 100,844
  - Metro density: 966.5/km^{2} (2,503/sq mi)
  - Municipal census (2019): 101,002
  - Estimate (2020): 106,736
- Demonym: Red Deerian
- Time zone: UTC−6 (Alberta Time)
- Forward sortation areas: T4N – T4R
- Area codes: 403, 587, 825, 368
- Highways: 2, 2A, 11, 11A, 595
- Waterways: Red Deer River, Waskasoo Creek, Piper Creek
- Website: reddeer.ca

Red Deer is a city in Alberta, Canada, located alongside the Red Deer River, midway on the Calgary–Edmonton Corridor. Red Deer is Alberta's third-largest city, after Calgary and Edmonton, with a slightly higher population than Lethbridge.

Red Deer serves Central Alberta, and its key industries include health care, retail trade, construction, oil and gas, hospitality, manufacturing and education. The city is surrounded by Red Deer County and borders on Lacombe County.

== History ==
The area was inhabited by First Nations including the Blackfoot, Plains Cree and Stoney before the arrival of European fur traders in the late eighteenth century. A First Nations trail ran from the Montana Territory across the Bow River near present-day Calgary and on to Fort Edmonton, later known as the Calgary and Edmonton Trail. The trail crossed the Red Deer River at a wide, stony shallows. The "Old Red Deer Crossing" is seven kilometres (4 1/2 miles) upstream from the present-day city.

Cree people called the river Waskasoo Seepee, which means "Elk River". European arrivals sometimes called North American elk "red deer", after the related Eurasian species, and later named the community after the river. The name for the modern city in Plains Cree is a calque of the English name (mihkwâpisimosos, literally "red type of deer"), while the name of the river itself is still wâwâskêsiw-sîpiy or "elk river".

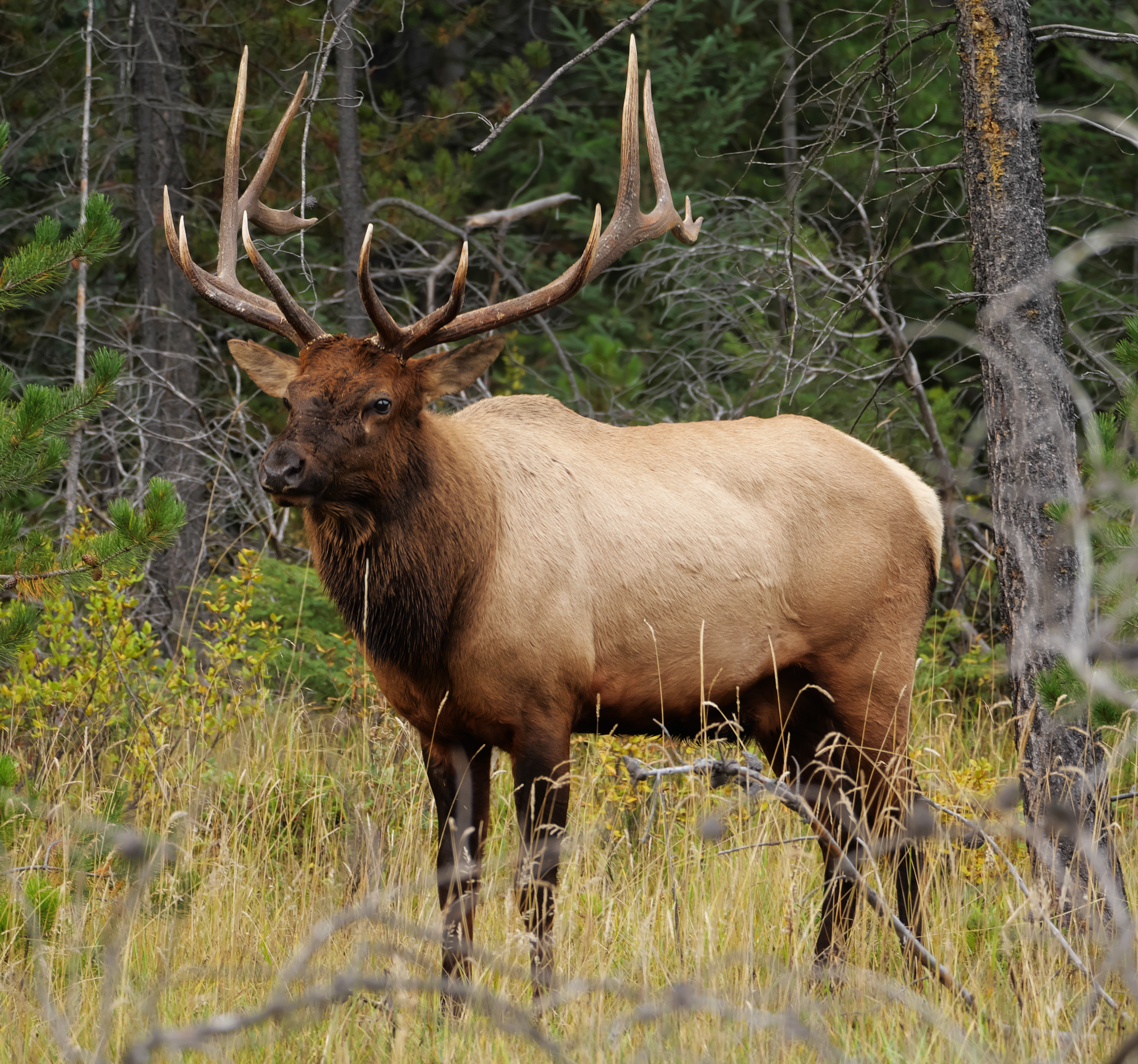
Elk deer in Jasper National Park near Maligne Canyon.

First Nations on the north side of the river entered into Treaty 6 in 1876 and on the south side Treaty 7 in 1877. Farmers and ranchers began to settle on the fertile lands.

A trading post and stopping house were built at the Crossing in 1882. This became Fort Normandeau during the 1885 North-West Rebellion.

Leonard Gaetz

Leonard Gaetz gave a half-share of 500 hectares (1,240 acres) he had acquired to the Calgary and Edmonton Railway to develop a bridge over the river and a townsite. As a result, the Crossing was gradually abandoned. The first trains arrived in 1891.

1900 to 1929

Following World War I, Red Deer emerged as a small, quiet, but prosperous, prairie city.

Bird watcher Elsie Cassels helped to establish the Gaetz Lakes bird sanctuary.

1930 to 1945

During Great Depression of the 1930s, Central Alberta was not hit by severe drought. The city was virtually debt-free and profited from its ownership of the local public utilities.

In World War II, a large army training camp was located where Cormack Armoury, the Memorial Centre and Lindsay Thurber High School are now. Two training airfields were built south of the city at Penhold and Bowden.

Post–Second World War

Red Deer expanded rapidly following the discovery of major oil reserves in Alberta in the late 1940s. Red Deer became a centre for oil and gas and related industries, such as the Joffre Cogeneration Plant.

North Red Deer was amalgamated in 1948.

Government and administrative services include a hospital, a courthouse and a provincial building.

The railway moved to the outskirts and passenger train service ceased. The CPR bridge is now a walking trail.

== Geography ==
=== Climate ===
Red Deer has a humid continental climate (Köppen Dfb), with something of a semi-arid influence due to the city's location within Palliser's Triangle. The highest temperature ever recorded in Red Deer was 37.2 °C (99 °F) on 8 July 1906, 2 July 1924, and 28 & 29 June 1937. The lowest recorded temperature was −50.6 °C (−59 °F) on 17 December 1924. The city lies in the 4a plant hardiness zone. Summers are typically warm and rainy with cool nights. Winters are typically long, cold, and very dry. The city is in aspen parkland, a region of rolling hills.

Climate data for Red Deer (Red Deer Regional Airport) WMO ID: 71878; coordinates 52°10′43″N 113°53′35″W; elevation: 904.6 m (2,968 ft); 1991–2020 normals, extremes 1904−present
Month	Jan	Feb	Mar	Apr	May	Jun	Jul	Aug	Sep	Oct	Nov	Dec	Year
Record high humidex	10.5	17.3	24.8	28.2	37.0	35.0	40.4	37.1	34.2	27.8	22.5	14.8	40.4
Record high °C (°F)	10.9 (51.6)	18.1 (64.6)	24.8 (76.6)	32.8 (91.0)	34.5 (94.1)	37.2 (99.0)	37.2 (99.0)	36.3 (97.3)	35.0 (95.0)	28.9 (84.0)	22.8 (73.0)	17.2 (63.0)	37.2 (99.0)
Mean daily maximum °C (°F)	−5.6 (21.9)	−3.5 (25.7)	1.3 (34.3)	10.1 (50.2)	16.8 (62.2)	20.0 (68.0)	22.9 (73.2)	22.4 (72.3)	17.8 (64.0)	10.4 (50.7)	1.1 (34.0)	−4.4 (24.1)	9.1 (48.4)
Daily mean °C (°F)	−11.6 (11.1)	−9.8 (14.4)	−4.6 (23.7)	3.6 (38.5)	9.7 (49.5)	13.7 (56.7)	16.2 (61.2)	15.2 (59.4)	10.4 (50.7)	3.5 (38.3)	−4.7 (23.5)	−10.3 (13.5)	2.6 (36.7)
Mean daily minimum °C (°F)	−17.6 (0.3)	−16.1 (3.0)	−10.5 (13.1)	−3.0 (26.6)	2.7 (36.9)	7.4 (45.3)	9.4 (48.9)	7.9 (46.2)	3.0 (37.4)	−3.4 (25.9)	−10.5 (13.1)	−16.2 (2.8)	−3.9 (25.0)
Record low °C (°F)	−46.1 (−51.0)	−43.9 (−47.0)	−42.8 (−45.0)	−32.8 (−27.0)	−15.6 (3.9)	−5.0 (23.0)	0.2 (32.4)	−5.1 (22.8)	−11.7 (10.9)	−28.8 (−19.8)	−38.4 (−37.1)	−50.6 (−59.1)	−50.6 (−59.1)
Record low wind chill	−60.1	−54.4	−49.8	−39.3	−20.9	−7.3	0.0	−5.3	−13.5	−37.9	−48.6	−57.4	−60.1
Average precipitation mm (inches)	16.3 (0.64)	11.9 (0.47)	19.3 (0.76)	28.1 (1.11)	58.4 (2.30)	97.7 (3.85)	90.0 (3.54)	70.1 (2.76)	38.3 (1.51)	21.6 (0.85)	16.8 (0.66)	14.1 (0.56)	482.6 (19.00)
Average rainfall mm (inches)	0.4 (0.02)	0.2 (0.01)	0.6 (0.02)	12.7 (0.50)	49.2 (1.94)	97.2 (3.83)	90.0 (3.54)	70.4 (2.77)	36.7 (1.44)	12.3 (0.48)	1.2 (0.05)	0.7 (0.03)	371.5 (14.63)
Average snowfall cm (inches)	20.2 (8.0)	15.1 (5.9)	23.3 (9.2)	18.1 (7.1)	9.5 (3.7)	0.0 (0.0)	0.0 (0.0)	0.4 (0.2)	2.4 (0.9)	10.2 (4.0)	20.0 (7.9)	18.8 (7.4)	137.8 (54.3)
Average precipitation days (≥ 0.2 mm)	10.0	7.2	8.9	9.1	11.7	15.1	13.6	11.5	9.5	8.4	7.7	7.9	120.6
Average rainy days (≥ 0.2 mm)	0.5	0.2	0.9	5.1	10.8	14.8	13.6	11.5	9.3	5.6	1.1	0.4	73.9
Average snowy days (≥ 0.2 cm)	10.0	7.1	8.5	5.6	2.3	0.1	0.0	0.1	0.6	4.2	7.3	8.6	54.4
Average relative humidity (%) (at 1500 LST)	65.7	62.5	58.4	45.4	41.7	50.6	52.2	49.0	47.3	50.0	64.0	66.5	54.4
Source: Environment and Climate Change Canada (June maximum) (July maximum, 1906 and 1924) (December minimum)

=== Neighbourhoods and localities ===
Red Deer includes the following neighbourhoods:

- Anders Park
- Anders Park East
- Anders South
- Aspen Ridge
- Bower
- Bower Ponds Recreation Area
- Central Park
- Chiles Industrial Park
- Clearview Extension
- Clearview Meadows
- Clearview Ridge
- College Park
- Davenport
- Deer Park Estates
- Deer Park Village
- Devonshire
- Downtown
- East Burnt Lake
- Eastview
- Eastview Estates
- Edgar Industrial Park
- Evergreen
- Fairview
- Gaetz Lakes Sanctuary
- Garden Heights
- Glendale
- Glendale Park Estates
- Golden West
- Grandview
- Heritage Ranch
- Highland Green
- Highland Green Estates
- Inglewood
- Ironstone
- Johnstone Crossing
- Johnstone Park
- Kentwood East
- Kentwood West
- Kingsgate
- Lancaster Green
- Lancaster Meadows
- Laredo
- Lonsdale
- Maskepetoon Park
- McKenzie Trail Recreation Area
- Michener Hill
- Morrisroe
- Morrisroe Extension
- Mountview
- Normandeau
- Northlands Industrial Park
- Oriole Park
- Oriole Park West
- Parkvale
- Pines
- Queens Business Park
- Red Deer College
- Red Deer Golf and Country Club
- Riverlands
- Riverside Heavy Industrial Park
- Riverside Light Industrial Park
- Riverside Meadows
- Rosedale Estates
- Rosedale Meadows
- South Hill
- Southbrook
- Southpointe Junction
- Sunnybrook
- Sunnybrook Extension
- Three Mile Bend Recreation Area
- Timber Ridge
- Timberlands
- Timberstone
- Vanier Woods
- Vanier Woods East
- Waskasoo
- Waste Management Facility
- West Burnt Lake
- West Park
- West QE2
- Westerner Park
- Westlake
- Woodlea

Red Deer's corporate limits also includes the localities of College Park, Forth, Labuma, and North Red Deer.

== Demographics ==
Federal census population history
Year	Pop.	±%
1901	323	—
1906	1,418	+339.0%
1911	2,118	+49.4%
1916	2,203	+4.0%
1921	2,328	+5.7%
1926	2,021	−13.2%
1931	2,344	+16.0%
1936	2,384	+1.7%
1941	2,924	+22.7%
1946	4,042	+38.2%
1951	7,575	+87.4%
1956	12,338	+62.9%
1961	19,612	+59.0%
1966	26,171	+33.4%
1971	27,674	+5.7%
1976	32,184	+16.3%
1981	46,393	+44.1%
1986	54,425	+17.3%
1991	58,145	+6.8%
1996	60,075	+3.3%
2001	67,707	+12.7%
2006	82,772	+22.3%
2011	90,564	+9.4%
2016	100,418	+10.9%
2021	100,844	+0.4%
Source: Statistics Canada

In the 2021 Census of Population conducted by Statistics Canada, the City of Red Deer had a population of 100,844 living in 40,512 of its 43,404 total private dwellings, a change of 0.4% from its 2016 population of 100,418. With a land area of 104.34 km^{2} (40.29 sq mi), it had a population density of 966.5/km^{2} (2,503.2/sq mi) in 2021.

The Red Deer census agglomeration (CA) was promoted to a census metropolitan area (CMA) in the 2021 Census, becoming the fourth CMA in Alberta (joining Calgary, Edmonton and Lethbridge). As of 2021, the Red Deer CMA is coincident with the City of Red Deer, thus it similarly had a population of 100,844 living in 40,512 of its 43,404 total private dwellings, a change of 0.4% from its 2016 population (when the CA was also coincident with the city) of 100,418. With a land area of 104.34 km^{2} (40.29 sq mi), it had a population density of 966.5/km^{2} (2,503.2/sq mi) in 2021.

The population of the City of Red Deer according to its 2019 municipal census is 101,002, a change of 1.2% from its 2016 municipal census population of 99,832.

In the 2016 Census of Population conducted by Statistics Canada, the City of Red Deer (and coincident Red Deer CA) had a population of 100,418 living in 39,982 of its 42,285 total private dwellings, a change of 10.9% from its 2011 population of 90,564. With a land area of 104.73 km^{2} (40.44 sq mi), it had a population density of 958.8/km^{2} (2,483.4/sq mi) in 2016.

=== Ethnicity ===
Largest ethnic origin in Red Deer CMA by census tract based on the 2021 census

The most common ethnicities in Red Deer as per the 2021 census are English (21.8%), German (18.7%), Scottish (18.1%), Irish (15.9%), Canadian (13.9%), French (8.8%), Ukrainian (8%), Filipino (7.6%), Dutch (4.7%), and Norwegian (4.6%).

According to the 2016 census, 15.2% of the general population identified as visible minority (non-aboriginal), an increase of 55.9% over the previous five years. A separate 7.1% reported North American Aboriginal Origins (4.2% First Nations and 3.1% Métis).

Panethnic groups in the City of Red Deer (2001–2021)
Panethnic group	2021		2016		2011		2006		2001	
Panethnic group	Pop.	%	Pop.	%	Pop.	%	Pop.	%	Pop.	%
European (Note: Statistic includes all persons that did not make up part of a visible minority or an indigenous identity.)	73,060	74.52%	78,065	79.27%	75,510	85.1%	71,955	88.43%	60,345	90.66%
Southeast Asian (Note: Statistic includes total responses of "Filipino" and "Southeast Asian" under visible minority section on census.)	8,970	9.15%	6,890	7%	2,935	3.31%	1,590	1.95%	1,245	1.87%
Indigenous	6,465	6.59%	5,185	5.27%	4,590	5.17%	3,600	4.42%	2,675	4.02%
East Asian (Note: Statistic includes total responses of "Chinese", "Korean", and "Japanese" under visible minority section on census.)	1,645	1.68%	1,800	1.83%	1,475	1.66%	1,090	1.34%	715	1.07%
South Asian	2,220	2.26%	1,665	1.69%	1,090	1.23%	630	0.77%	480	0.72%
Middle Eastern (Note: Statistic includes total responses of "West Asian" and "Arab" under visible minority section on census.)	1,130	1.15%	915	0.93%	485	0.55%	210	0.26%	270	0.41%
Latin American	1,725	1.76%	1,765	1.79%	1,185	1.34%	1,410	1.73%	480	0.72%
African	1,940	1.98%	1,735	1.76%	990	1.12%	680	0.84%	280	0.42%
Other (Note: Statistic includes total responses of "Visible minority, n.i.e." and "Multiple visible minorities" under visible minority section on census.)	895	0.91%	455	0.46%	485	0.55%	195	0.24%	80	0.12%
Total responses	98,045	97.22%	98,480	98.07%	88,735	97.98%	81,370	98.31%	66,565	98.31%
Total population	100,844	100%	100,418	100%	90,564	100%	82,772	100%	67,707	100%

- Note: Totals greater than 100% due to multiple origin responses.

=== Religion ===
Largest non-Christian religion in Red Deer CMA by census tract based on the 2021 census

According to the 2021 census, the religious makeup of Red Deer was:

- Christian (50,345; or 51.4%)
- irreligious (43,050; 43.9%)
- Muslim (2,055; 2.1%)
- Hindu (785; 0.8%)
- Buddhist (575; 0.6%)
- Sikh (285; 0.3%)
- Indigenous spirituality (165; 0.2%)
- Jewish (105; 0.1%)

== Arts and culture ==
Red Deer hosts many arts and cultural groups, including: Central Alberta Theatre, Ignition Theatre, Red Deer Players Society, Bull Skit Comedy troupe, Central Music Festival, the Red Deer Symphony Orchestra, the Red Deer Museum + Art Gallery, the Red Deer Royals and other performing arts and fine arts organizations. The Red Deer Arts Council is a member-based Multi-disciplinary Arts Service Organization and registered charity that serves the local and area community of visual, literary and performing artists.

== Attractions ==
Alberta Sports Hall of Fame
The Alberta Sports Hall of Fame is adjacent to the Queen Elizabeth II Highway (Highway 2) and the Greater Red Deer Visitor Centre.
Canyon Ski Area
The Canyon Ski Resort is 7.5 km (4.7 mi) east of Red Deer.
Marchant Crane Centrium
The Centrium hosts sports events, concerts, trade shows and conventions. It is the home of the WHL's Red Deer Rebels.
YMCA Northside Community Centre
The YMCA Northside Community Centre offers summer day camps, facility rentals, group fitness classes with childminding, and children and youth sports, arts and education programming. The facility also features a gymnasium, fitness studio, teaching kitchen, youth drop-in space, and multi-purpose spaces for children's programs and special event rentals.
Collicutt Centre
The Collicutt Centre is a 23,000 m^{2} (250,000 ft^{2}) recreation centre that includes a leisure pool, water park, climbing and bouldering walls, field house, ice arena, gymnastics, meeting and dance rooms, a walking / running track, and carpet turf facilities. It also has child care facilities and several small businesses.
G.H. Dawe Community Centre
The 12,000 m^{2} (130,000 ft^{2}) G.H. Dawe Community Centre is shared by G.H. Dawe Community School, the G.H. Dawe Branch of the Red Deer Public Library, G.H. Dawe Centre Recreation Facility and St. Patrick's School.
Greater Red Deer Visitor Centre
The Greater Red Deer Visitor Centre is adjacent to the Queen Elizabeth II Highway (Highway 2) and the Alberta Sports Hall of Fame.
Recreation Centre
The Recreation Centre, located downtown, has indoor and outdoor pools, steam rooms and hot tubs among other features.
Red Deer Museum + Art Gallery
The Red Deer Museum has a permanent exhibit detailing the history of the region, and temporary exhibits that change every few months. It is also the venue of multiple educational programs for both adults and children.
Waskasoo Park
Waskasoo Park meanders through Red Deer from its outskirts in the southwest, through the heart of the city, to its outskirts in the northeast along the Red Deer River. It includes over 80 kilometres (50 miles) of multi-use trails for biking, rollerblading, horseback riding, snowshoeing, cross-country skiing and walking. The park is one of the reasons Red Deer is known as "Park City."
Westerner Exposition Grounds
The Westerner Exposition Grounds hosts events such as Agricon and Westerner Days. Held in early July, Westerner Days includes a rodeo, pony chuck-wagon racing, a fair, exhibitions and other events.

== Sports ==
The Red Deer Rebels of the Western Hockey League play at the Marchant Crane Centrium. Red Deer hosted the 2022 Hlinka Gretzky Cup and co-hosted the 2018 Hlinka Gretzky Cup. The Rebels hosted the 2016 Memorial Cup. Red Deer replaced Edmonton as host of the Canadian Finals Rodeo from 2018 to 2023.

Red Deer hosted the 2019 Canada Winter Games, leaving the Gary W. Harris Canada Games Centre at Red Deer Polytechnic and the Downtown Servus Arena as legacy facilities.

The city is the hometown to numerous Olympic and NHL athletes. Hockey Night in Canada personality Ron MacLean calls Red Deer home.

== Transportation ==
The Queen Elizabeth II Highway links the North-South Calgary-Edmonton Corridor, including Wetaskiwin and Camrose, with Red Deer.

The David Thompson Highway links Rocky Mountain House in the West Country with Stettler in East-Central Alberta.

Red Deer Regional Airport, in Penhold, serves mostly general aviation and is expanding to encourage passenger service.

Red Deer Transit provides local bus service throughout the city.

== Infrastructure ==
Health care

The Red Deer Regional Hospital is undergoing a significant expansion.

Water

Red Deer receives its drinking water supply from the Red Deer River which is treated and distributed throughout the city. One distinct feature of the water distribution system is the Horton Water Spheroid which, at the time of its construction in 1957, was the world's largest spheroid shaped reservoir.

Water from the Red Deer water treatment plant is distributed to neighbouring communities including Red Deer County, Lacombe, Blackfalds and Ponoka as managed by the North Red Deer Regional Water Services Commission.

== Education ==
=== Post-secondary ===
Red Deer Polytechnic (RDP), formerly Red Deer College, was founded in 1964 as Red Deer Junior College. RDP offers certificates, diplomas, advanced certificates, applied degrees, bachelor's degrees, academic upgrading and apprenticeship in over 75 different career and academic programs, including the creative and liberal arts, engineering, and trades.

=== Secondary ===
Three school authorities operate in Red Deer. Founded in 1887, the Red Deer Public School District serves 10,000 students in thirty schools. Offering a wide range of programming, including French Immersion from K-12, the district hosts international students from around the world. They operate Lindsay Thurber Comprehensive High School and Hunting Hills High School.

Founded in 1909, when the Daughters of Wisdom, a religious order from France, accepted the challenge of the Tinchebray Fathers, also from France, to offer Catholic schooling in Red Deer, Red Deer Catholic Regional Schools (RDCRS) welcomes over 10,000 students in six Central Alberta communities, including Red Deer. They operate École Secondaire Notre Dame High School and St. Joseph's High School.

Greater North Central Francophone Education Region No. 2's school École La Prairie is a French school near downtown Red Deer that offers pre-kindergarten through grade 9 programs. It offers all courses in French to a population of 119 students whose first language is French.

Public schools

Elementary
- Annie L. Gaetz Elementary (K–5)
- Aspen Heights Elementary (K–5)
- Barrie Wilson Elementary School (K–5)
- Don Campbell Elementary (K-5)
- Fairview Elementary (K–5)
- G.W. Smith Elementary (K–5)
- Gateway Christian School (K–5)
- G.H. Dawe Community School (K–8)
- Glendale School (PreK–8)
- Grandview Elementary (K–5)
- Joseph Welsh Elementary (K–5)
- Mattie McCullough Elementary (K–5)
- Mountview Elementary (K–5)
- Normandeau School (K–8)
- Oriole Park Elementary (K–5)
- Pines School (K–5)
- West Park Elementary (K–5)
Middle school
- Central Middle School (6–8)
- Eastview Middle School (6–8)
- G.H. Dawe Community School (K–8)
- Gateway Christian School (6–8)
- Glendale School (PreK–8)
- Normandeau School (K–8)
- West Park Middle School (6–8)
Secondary/high school
- École Secondaire Lindsay Thurber Comprehensive High School (9–12)
- Gateway Christian School (9–12)
- Hunting Hills High School (9–12)
- North Cottage High School (10–12)

Catholic schools

Elementary
- École Camille J. Lerouge School (K–9)
- École Mother Teresa School (K–5)
- École Our Lady of the Rosary School (PreK–2)
- Father Henri Voisin School (K–5)
- Holy Family School (K–5)
- Maryview School (PreK–5)
- St. Elizabeth Seton School (K–5)
- St. Marguerite Bourgeoys School (PreK–5)
- St. Martin de Porres School (K–5)
- St. Patrick's Community School (K–9)
- St. Teresa of Avila School (PreK-5)
Middle school
- École Camille J. Lerouge School (K–9)
- St. Francis of Assisi Middle School (6–9)
- St Lorenzo Ruiz Middle School (6–9)
- St. Patrick's Community School (K–9)
- St. Thomas Aquinas Middle School (6–9)
Secondary/high school
- École Secondaire Notre Dame High School (10–12)
- St. Joseph's High School (10–12)

Private schools

- Destiny Christian School Society (ECS, K–9)
- Koinonia Christian School – Red Deer (ECS, K–12)
- Parkland School Special Education (1–12)
- South Side Christian School (ECS, K–12)

== Media ==
The local news outlets are the Red Deer Advocate and rdnewsNOW. The City of Red Deer also releases regular updates.

== See also ==
- List of cities in Alberta
- List of communities in Alberta
- Category:People from Red Deer, Alberta
