= Ardill, Saskatchewan =

Hamlet in Saskatchewan, Canada

Ardill
- Hamlet
- Location within Saskatchewan Location within Canada
- Coordinates: 49.9392°N 105.8419°W
- Country: Canada
- Province: Saskatchewan
- Region: Southwest Saskatchewan
- Census division: 3
- Rural Municipality: Lake Johnston No. 102
- Restructured (Hamlet): December 31, 1972

Government
  - Reeve: Ivan Costley
  - Administrator: Sherry Green
  - Governing body: Lake Johnston No. 102

Area
  - Total: 0 km^{2} (0 sq mi)

Population (2001)
  - Total: 0
  - Density: 0/km^{2} (0/sq mi)
- Time zone: CST
- Postal code: S0H 3G0
- Area code: 306
- Highways: Highway 2 Highway 715

Ardill is a hamlet in the RM of Lake Johnston No. 102, Saskatchewan, Canada. Listed as a designated place by Statistics Canada, the hamlet had a listed population of 0 in the Canada 2006 Census.

All that currently remains is the bar which was issued liquor licence #1. The bar closed in 2019. Ardill is located between Assiniboia and Moose Jaw, south of Old Wives Lake and at the northern end of Lake of the Rivers.

== Demographics ==
Population history (1921–1971)
Year	Pop.	±%
1921	26	—
1926	49	+88.5%
1931	38	−22.4%
1936	36	−5.3%
1941	82	+127.8%
1946	37	−54.9%
1951	38	+2.7%
1956	34	−10.5%
1961	31	−8.8%
1966	28	−9.7%
1971	26	−7.1%
Source: Government of Canada

Ardill, like so many other small communities throughout Saskatchewan, has struggled to maintain a sturdy population, resulting in a ghost town with no population.

Previously, Ardill was incorporated under village status, but on December 31, 1972, it was restructured as a hamlet under the jurisdiction of the Rural Municipality of Lake Johnston No. 102.

In 2001, Ardill had a population of 0, the same as in 1996. The village had a land area of 0 square kilometres (0 sq mi).

== Infrastructure ==
The former Saskatchewan Transportation Company provided intercity bus service to Ardill.

== See also ==
- List of communities in Saskatchewan
- List of hamlets in Saskatchewan
