= Expanse, Saskatchewan =

Hamlet in Saskatchewan, Canada

Expanse
- Hamlet
- Location within Lake Johnston No. 102 Location within Saskatchewan
- Coordinates: 49.9851°N 105.8447°W
- Country: Canada
- Province: Saskatchewan
- Rural municipality: Lake Johnston No. 102
- Post office Founded (Lake Johnston): 1908-09-01
- Post office renamed Expanse: 1912-05-01

Government
  - Reeve: Ivan Costley
  - Administrator: Sherry Green
  - Governing body: Lake Johnston No. 102
  - MLA: Dave Marit
  - MP: Jeremy Patzer

Area
  - Total: 0 km^{2} (0 sq mi)

Population (2006)
  - Total: 0
  - Density: 0/km^{2} (0/sq mi)
- Time zone: CST
- Postal code: S0H 3G0
- Area code: 306
- Highways: Highway 2

Expanse, Saskatchewan is an unincorporated area in the Rural Municipality of Lake Johnston No. 102, in the Canadian province of Saskatchewan. Expanse is just south of Old Wives Lake on a grid road. The grid connects to Highway 2 near Ardill in south central Saskatchewan. Just to the south of Highway 2 is Lake of the Rivers. Expanse is too small to be enumerated as a separate entity during the census taking, so it was a part of the population given for RM of Lake Johnston No. 102.

Today the former community school, a private residence, a Historical marker and a few foundations are all that remain of Expanse's prosperous pioneer days.

== History ==
Population history (1916–1931)
Year	Pop.	±%
1916	168	—
1921	126	−25.0%
1926	106	−15.9%
1931	102	−3.8%
Source: Government of Canada

The post office was formed on September 1, 1908, under the name Lake Johnston with postmaster Frank E. Crosby and was located at Sec.12, Twp.12, R.29, W of the 2nd meridian. A. S. MacDonald was the successor on May 1, 1912, and the post office now changed names to Expanse.

Taken from the town's Historical marker, erected in 1994 by the Rural municipality of Johnston Lake and the Saskatchewan History & Folklore Society Inc.:

Canadian Pacific Railway purchased the townsite in 1911 and named it Expanse. Incorporated as a village in 1912, the first village meeting was held January 7, 1913. Expanse was the fifth town on the CPR line south of the city of Moose Jaw. It was the end of the CPR track for the south part of the province from July 1912 until 1914. As an "end of Track" Boom Town, homesteaders got supplies and brought grain to Expanse from as far south as the United States border. Expanse was disorganized as a village in 1935.

== See also ==
- List of communities in Saskatchewan
- List of hamlets in Saskatchewan

== Notes ==
- Lake Johnston—Sutton Historical Society; ISBN 0-88925-089-8 WebPAC PRO © Innovative Interfaces, Inc., University of Saskatchewan Online Library Database
