= Mitchellton =

Hamlet in Saskatchewan, Canada

Mitchellton is a hamlet in the Rural Municipality of Lake Johnston No. 102, Saskatchewan, Canada. Access is from Highway 715. It previously held the status of a village until January 1, 1939.

== Demographics ==
Population history (1921–1936)
Year	Pop.	±%
1921	56	—
1926	52	−7.1%
1931	37	−28.8%
1936	39	+5.4%
Source: Government of Canada

Prior to January 1, 1939, Mitchellton was incorporated as a village, and was restructured as a hamlet under the jurisdiction of the Rural municipality of Lake Johnston No. 102 on that date.

== See also ==
- List of communities in Saskatchewan
- List of hamlets in Saskatchewan
