= Intercity Express (disambiguation) =

Intercity Express is a high-speed rail system in Germany.

Intercity Express may also refer to:

- Intercity Express (Indian Railways)
- NSB InterCity Express, Norway
- InterCity Express (Queensland Rail), Australian electrical multiple unit
- Intercity Express, a branding used by Canadian public transit operator Airdrie Transit

== See also ==
- Intercity Express Programme, UK procurement programme of replacement high speed trains for InterCity 125 and InterCity 225
