= Theodore station =

Railway station in Saskatchewan, Canada

Coordinates: 51.4250°N 102.9224°W

Theodore
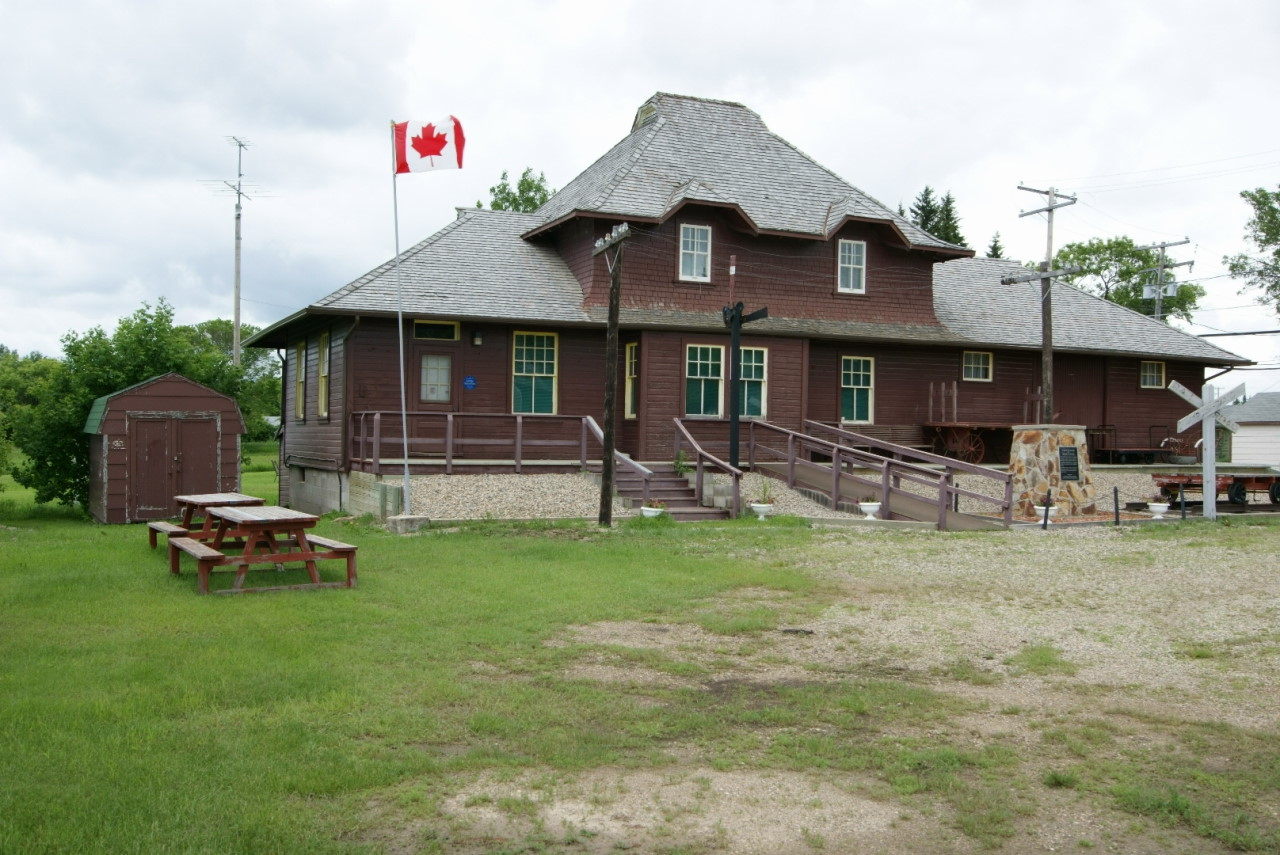

General information
- Location: 6 Christopher Street N Theodore, Saskatchewan

History
- Opened: 1902

Former services
Preceding station	Canadian Pacific Railway	Following station
Insinger toward Edmonton	Edmonton – Portage la Prairie	Springside toward Portage la Prairie
Insinger toward Nipawin	Nipawin – Bredenbury	Springside toward Bredenbury
Location

Theodore station is a municipal building and former railway station in Theodore, Saskatchewan, Canada. It was originally built by the Canadian Pacific Railway. The two story station building is of wood construction as is the last remaining station of the Type Nine Canadian Pacific Railway Station design developed by Ralph Benjamin Pratt. Offices and waiting areas were designed to occupy the ground floor, while the second floor dormers contained the residence for the station master.

Rail service to the town ended in the 1970s, the station building was moved from its original location to the current location in 1974 to be used as a Senior's center, later turned into the home for the Theodore Historical Museum.
