= Grant McLean =

Grant McLean is a Senior Manager with the Government of Alberta. He is the former Mayor of the City of Airdrie and also a former Aide de Camp to the Lieutenant Governor of Alberta. He is an Officer in the Order of Military Merit (Canada) and in 2005 was awarded the Alberta Centennial Medal.

Grant McLean took his employer, the Government of Alberta, to court for negligent misrepresentation in a matter relating to his pension. In 1982 he left the Canadian Army after 14 years of service to work in a senior management position with the Calgary Correctional Centre. He was assured in writing by the personnel manager who hired him that his military pension was transferable to the province of Alberta's pension plan. That turned out to be wrong. The case was mentioned in the proceedings of the Alberta Legislature. The solicitor general's department did not comment on Grant McLean's claims.

Grant McLean won his case on 13 April 2009.
