= Airdrie Christian Academy =

Coordinates: 51.270854°N 113.990117°W

Location
- 77 Gateway Drive NE, Airdrie, AB; Airdrie, Canada, Alberta, T4B 0J6

Information
- Former name: Airdrie Koinonia Christian School
- School type: Private Christian School
- Denomination: Christian
- Opened: September 1987
- Head of School: Andrew Casali
- Principal: Cristie Watt
- Chaplain: Jaime Young

Airdrie Christian Academy, or ACA and formerly known as Airdrie Koinonia Christian School or AKCS, is a private K-12 school located in Airdrie, Alberta. The school was founded in 1987 by Brian Hazeltine and was one of the largest schools in the Calgary area. In 2019 it renamed as Airdrie Christian Academy. The school has developed a reputation for academic excellence, and has been ranked among the top schools in Alberta. (In 2012 the Fraser Institute ranked the AKCS Elementary School in the top 25% of the province at 157 of 665 schools.)

== Building ==
The school originally occupied the basement of Living Springs Christian Fellowship (then known as Fellowship Bible Chapel), but in 1996 moved into a series of portable buildings behind Faith Community Baptist Church. In March 2012, they broke ground on what would be their first non-rental location.
