= Lake of the Rivers =

Lake in Saskatchewan, Canada

- Location in Saskatchewan Lake of the Rivers (Canada)
- Location: RM of Lake of the Rivers No. 72, RM of Lake Johnston No. 102 in Saskatchewan
- Coordinates: 49.8167°N 105.7339°W
- Part of: Missouri River drainage basin
- Basin countries: Canada
- Surface area: 4,201 ha (10,380 acres)
- Shore length^{1}: 125 km (78 mi)
- Surface elevation: 666 m (2,185 ft)
- Settlements: None
- ^{1} Shore length is not a well-defined measure.

Lake of the Rivers is a shallow salt lake in the Canadian province of Saskatchewan. It is in the Prairie Pothole Region of North America, which extends throughout three Canadian provinces and five U.S. states, and within Palliser's Triangle and the Great Plains ecoregion of Canada. It is a long and narrow lake located in an extensive valley that was formed by glacial meltwaters at the end of the last ice age. The valley originates just north of Lake of the Rivers near Old Wives Lake and meanders generally to the south towards the Big Muddy Badlands. Also in the same valley is Willow Bunch Lake.

The closest town to Lake of the Rivers, Assiniboia, is about 11 kilometres (6.8 mi) west of the southern end of the lake. The lake spans two rural municipalities, Lake of the Rivers No. 72 and Lake Johnston No. 102, and sits at the northern slope of the Missouri Coteau. The hamlet of Ardill and Highways 715 and 2 are at the northern end of the lake while Highway 717 is at the southern end. Less than 2 kilometres (1.2 mi) from the southern end of the lake is the community of Willows and Willows Reservoir. A section of Assiniboia Regional Park is at the reservoir and the river leaving the reservoir is a tributary of Lake of the Rivers.

== See also ==
- List of lakes of Saskatchewan
