= Waskasoo Creek =

Coordinates: 52.28342°N 113.802°W

Waskasoo Creek is a creek that is mostly in Red Deer, Alberta but also passes through Penhold, Alberta after Innisfail, Alberta. The creek empties into the Red Deer River. Significant stretches of the creek were straightened in the 1970s to alleviate flooding.

== See also ==
- List of rivers of Alberta

== Tributaries ==
- Piper Creek
