= Acadia Valley =

- Hamlet
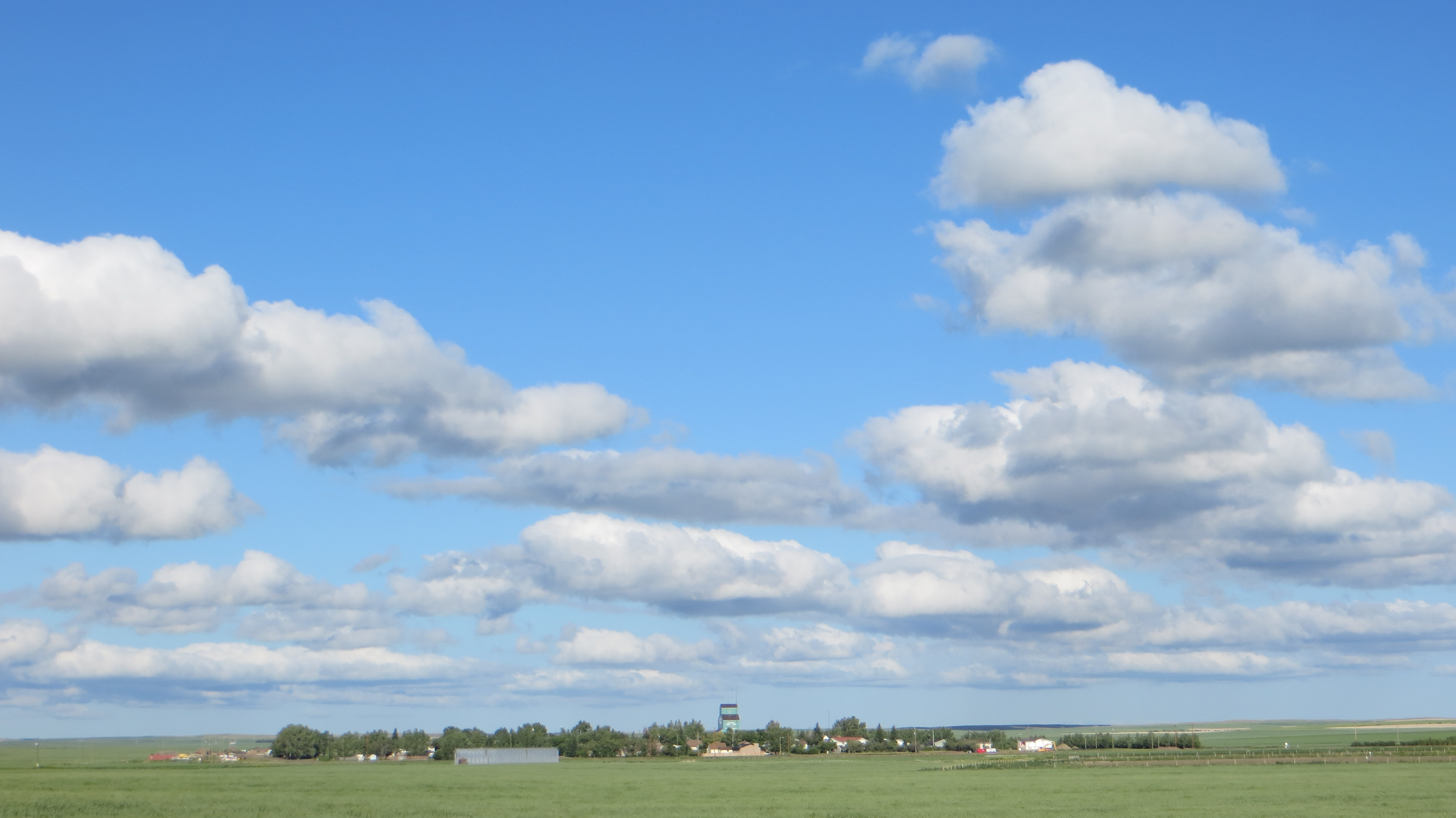

- Location in M.D. of Acadia Location in Alberta
- Coordinates: 51.1569°N 110.2097°W
- Country: Canada
- Province: Alberta
- Planning region: Red Deer
- Municipal district: M.D. of Acadia No. 34

Government
  - Type: Unincorporated
  - Governing body: M.D. of Acadia No. 34 Council

Area (2021)
  - Land: 0.46 km^{2} (0.18 sq mi)
- Elevation: 716 m (2,349 ft)

Population (2021)
  - Total: 143
  - Density: 308.1/km^{2} (798/sq mi)
- Time zone: UTC−06:00 (Alberta Time)

Acadia Valley is a hamlet in southeast Alberta, Canada within the Municipal District (MD) of Acadia No. 34. The MD of Acadia No. 34's municipal office is located in Acadia Valley.

Acadia Valley is located along Highway 41 commonly referred to as Buffalo Trail between Oyen and Medicine Hat and sits about 14.5 km (9.0 mi) west of the Alberta-Saskatchewan border. Acadia Valley sits at an elevation of 716 m (2,349 ft).

The hamlet is located within census division No. 4. It was named in 1910 by settlers from Nova Scotia.

== Demographics ==
Population history of Acadia Valley
Year	Pop.	±%
1941	86	—
1951	155	+80.2%
1956	249	+60.6%
1961	239	−4.0%
1966	222	−7.1%
1971	166	−25.2%
1976	136	−18.1%
1981	125	−8.1%
1986	132	+5.6%
1991	118	−10.6%
1991A	122	+3.4%
1996	138	+13.1%
2001	122	−11.6%
2006	140	+14.8%
2011	137	−2.1%
2016	149	+8.8%
2021	143	−4.0%
Source: Statistics Canada

In the 2021 Census of Population conducted by Statistics Canada, Acadia Valley had a population of 143 living in 71 of its 86 total private dwellings, a change of −4% from its 2016 population of 149. With a land area of 0.46 km^{2} (0.18 sq mi), it had a population density of 310.9/km^{2} (805.1/sq mi) in 2021.

As a designated place in the 2016 Census of Population conducted by Statistics Canada, Acadia Valley had a population of 149 living in 71 of its 82 total private dwellings, a change of 8.8% from its 2011 population of 137. With a land area of 0.47 km^{2} (0.18 sq mi), it had a population density of 317.0/km^{2} (821.1/sq mi) in 2016.

== Attractions ==
- Prairie Elevator Museum
- Acadia Municipal Recreation Dam - trout fishing

== See also ==
- List of communities in Alberta
- List of designated places in Alberta
- List of hamlets in Alberta
