= Airdrie Transit =

Transportation system in Airdrie, Alberta

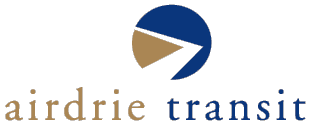
- Founded: 1980
- Headquarters: Airdrie City Hall
- Locale: Airdrie, Alberta
- Service area: Calgary Metropolitan Region
- Service type: regional transit, urban transit, paratransit
- Routes: 5
- Destinations: Calgary, Alberta, Airdrie, Alberta
- Stations: Gateway, Sierra Springs, Genesis Place, Creekside Crossing
- Fleet: New Flyer D60LFR, New Flyer XD60, Novabus LFS, Nova LFS Artic, Arboc minibus
- Operator: Transdev
- Website: airdrietransit.ca

Airdrie Transit is a public transportation system which serves the city of Airdrie, Alberta, Canada, which is located just north of Calgary within the Calgary–Edmonton Corridor. Service consists of the Intercity Express (ICE) regional transit service, three conventional fixed routes within Airdrie and ACCESS Airdrie a paratransit service.

Airdrie Transit operates the Calgary Region's first regional transit service, the Intercity Express. The service operates during peak morning and afternoons between Airdrie and downtown Calgary on two routes, Route 901 East and Route 902 West. The service also operates on weekends and holidays between Airdrie (Sierra Springs) and Rundle (C-Train) station via CrossIron Mills mall on Route 900.

== Changes ==
Effective May 2, 2011, changes were made to the local fixed route and ICE services. The improvements were based on public consultations and included schedule and route adjustments to the ICE service and associated changes to the local feeder network. The most significant change being the routing of the ICE service to a downtown express routing via Deerfoot to Calgary in the morning and returning from Calgary in the afternoon.

In August 2024, Airdrie Transit contracted Transdev to be the operator of its bus transit system.

In April 2026, the City of Airdrie approved a 10-year Transit Master Plan which included plans for expanded intercity service to northwest Calgary, fare integration with Calgary Transit, and expanded service hours.

== Routes ==
- 1 (Green)- serves Sagewood, Fairways, Woodside, Canals, Willowbrook, Creekside Crossing, Downtown, Old Town, Sunridge, Jensen, Stonegate, and East Lake Industrial neighborhoods
- 3 (Blue)- serves Big Springs, Thorburn, Meadowbrook, King's Heights, Ravenswood, Yankee Valley, Luxstone, Canals, Pointe of View, Creekside, Prairie Springs, Coopers Crossing, and Sierra Springs neighborhoods
- 900 (Intercity Express Airdrie-CrossIron Mills-Rundle (C-Train))
- 901 (Intercity Express) - Serving East Airdrie
- 902 (Intercity Express) - Serving West Airdrie

== See also ==
- Public transport in Canada
