= Piper Creek (Alberta) =

Watercourse in Red Deer, Alberta, Canada

Piper Creek is a creek in Red Deer County, Alberta that flows into Waskasoo Creek. It flows into an intersection with Waskasoo Creek (52.2618°N 113.8112°W).

== See also ==
- List of rivers of Alberta
