= Prairie Elevator Museum =

Canadian former grain elevator in Alberta

The Prairie Elevator
- Location: Acadia Valley, Alberta, Canada
- Coordinates: 51.15821°N 110.20305°W
- Type: open-air, farm history, tea house, gift shop
- Website: The Prairie Elevator Museum and Tea House

The Prairie Elevator Museum is a former Alberta Wheat Pool grain elevator that has been restored and converted into a community gift shop and tea house. The elevator stands within the Hamlet of Acadia Valley, Alberta, next to the defunct Canadian National Railway track bed.

The last of three, the former Alberta Wheat Pool, was saved from demolition when local residents in and around the community of Acadia Valley rallied together to save the last elevator. The elevator has since been completely restored to working condition but is not operable. Within the site are a tea house, a gift shop and a museum. The museum was created to explain how earlier examples of the wood-cribbed grain elevators used work and handle millions of bushels of grain and the importance they once held in many smaller communities, a prairie landmark that continues to disappear across the horizon of the North American prairies.

A restored Canadian National Railway (CNR) caboose has also been placed on the former track bed of the defunct Canadian National Railway. The caboose was placed to remember that there was a railroad that once came through the hamlet of Acadia Valley.

== See also ==
- Acadia Valley, Alberta
- List of grain elevators
- List of museums in Alberta
