= Rural Municipality of Lake Johnston No. 102 =

Rural municipality in Saskatchewan, Canada

Lake Johnston No. 102
- Rural municipality
- Rural Municipality of Lake Johnston No. 102

- Location of the RM of Lake Johnston No. 102 in Saskatchewan
- Coordinates: 49.898°N 105.815°W
- Country: Canada
- Province: Saskatchewan
- Census division: 3
- SARM division: 2
- Federal riding: Cypress Hills—Grasslands
- Provincial riding: Wood River
- Formed: December 9, 1912

Government
  - Reeve: Wes Hutchinson
  - Governing body: RM of Lake Johnston No. 102 Council
  - Administrator: Taysha Siebeneich
  - Office location: Mossbank

Area (2021)
  - Land: 555.8 km^{2} (214.6 sq mi)

Population (2021)
  - Total: 140
  - Density: 0.3/km^{2} (0.78/sq mi)
- Time zone: CST
  - Summer (DST): CST
- Postal code: S0H 3G0
- Area codes: 306 and 639

The Rural Municipality of Lake Johnston No. 102 (2021 population: 140) is a rural municipality (RM) in the Canadian province of Saskatchewan within Census Division No. 3 and SARM Division No. 2. Located in the southwest portion of the province, it is north of the town of Assiniboia and south of the city of Moose Jaw.

== History ==
The RM of Lake Johnston No. 102 incorporated as a rural municipality on December 9, 1912.

== Geography ==
=== Communities and localities ===
The following urban municipalities are surrounded by the RM.

Towns

- Mossbank

The following unincorporated communities are within the RM.

Localities

- Ardill, dissolved as a village, December 31, 1972
- Bishopric
- Dunkirk
- Expanse, dissolved as a village, January 1, 1935
- Mitchellton, dissolved as a village, January 1, 1939

== Demographics ==
Population history (1981–2021)
Year	Pop.	±%
1981	312	—
1986	303	−2.9%
1991	242	−20.1%
1996	195	−19.4%
2001	175	−10.3%
2006	161	−8.0%
2011	160	−0.6%
2016	170	+6.2%
2021	140	−17.6%
Source: Statistics Canada via Saskatchewan Bureau of Statistics

In the 2021 Census of Population conducted by Statistics Canada, the RM of Lake Johnston No. 102 had a population of 140 living in 54 of its 64 total private dwellings, a change of −17.6% from its 2016 population of 170. With a land area of 555.8 km^{2} (214.6 sq mi), it had a population density of 0.3/km^{2} (0.7/sq mi) in 2021.

In the 2016 Census of Population, the RM of Lake Johnston No. 102 recorded a population of 170 living in 62 of its 67 total private dwellings, a 6.3% change from its 2011 population of 160. With a land area of 567.24 km^{2} (219.01 sq mi), it had a population density of 0.3/km^{2} (0.8/sq mi) in 2016.

== Attractions ==
Two nearby conservation areas include the Old Wives Lake Bird Sanctuary and the Isle of Bays Wildlife Refuge. They are 16 km (9.9 mi) and 10 km (6.2 mi) north of Expanse respectively.

== Government ==
The RM of Lake Johnston No. 102 is governed by an elected municipal council and an appointed Administrator that meets on the second Tuesday of every month. The reeve of the RM is Sacha Martens while its Administrator is Boyd Holland. The RM's office is located in Mossbank.

== See also ==
- List of rural municipalities in Saskatchewan
