= 1946 Canadian census =

- June 1, 1946

General information
- Country: Canada

Results
- Total population: 12,292,000 (estimate)

The 1946 Canadian census was the fifth, and last, of a series of special censuses conducted by the Government of Canada covering the rapidly expanding Northwest Provinces of Alberta, Saskatchewan, and Manitoba. These censuses were conducted every ten years from 1906 to 1946, and ceased when the nationwide census switched from decennial (every year ending in 1) to quinquennial (every year ending in 1 or 6) in 1956. This census was conducted as of June 1, 1946.

The entire population of Canada for 1946 was estimated at 12,292,000, an increase of 1.8% over the previous year.

The Prairie Provinces in 1946 recorded a total of 2,362,941 individuals, the only instance where the population recorded a decrease compared to the previous special census. Of those, 726,923 resided in Manitoba, 832,688 resided in Saskatchewan, and 803,330 resided in Alberta.

Canada's Statistics Act legislation does not permit the release of personal information until 92 years have elapsed. Detailed information from this census is not due for release until 2038.

The previous census was the nationwide 1941 census and the following census was the nationwide 1951 census.

== See also ==
- Population and housing censuses by country
