= 1951 Canadian census =

Census in Canada; first to include Newfoundland

- June 1, 1951

General information
- Country: Canada

Results
- Total population: 14,009,429 (▲21.8%)

The 1951 Canadian census was a detailed enumeration of the Canadian population. The total population count was 14,009,429, representing a 21.8% increase over the 1941 census population count of 11,506,655. The 1951 census was the ninth comprehensive decennial census since Canadian Confederation on July 1, 1867.

The previous census was the Northwest Provinces of Alberta, Saskatchewan, and Manitoba 1946 census and the following census was the 1956 census – the first quinquennial, rather than decennial, nationwide census.

This was the first census to include Newfoundland, having joined Confederation only two years prior.

Canada's Statistics Act legislation does not permit the release of personal information until 92 years have elapsed. Detailed information from this census is not due for release until 2042.

== Population by province ==
Province	1951 census	1941 census	Difference	% change
Newfoundland	361,416	Joined Confederation in 1949		
Prince Edward Island	98,429	95,047	3,382	3.6%
Nova Scotia	642,584	577,962	64,622	11.2%
New Brunswick	515,697	457,401	58,296	12.7%
Quebec	4,055,681	3,331,882	723,799	21.7%
Ontario	4,597,542	3,787,655	809,887	21.4%
Manitoba	776,541	729,744	46,797	6.4%
Saskatchewan	831,728	895,992	−64,264	−7.2%
Alberta	939,501	796,169	143,332	18.0%
British Columbia	1,165,210	817,861	347,349	42.5%
Yukon Territory	9,096	4,914	4,182	85.1%
Northwest Territories	16,004	12,028	3,976	33.1%
Total	14,009,429	11,506,655	2,502,774	21.8%

Ontario added the largest number of new residents since the 1941 census, while British Columbia saw the highest growth rate among the provinces, becoming the first western province to reach one million inhabitants. Saskatchewan experienced a second consecutive decade of population decline, falling behind both Alberta and British Columbia in size.

Newfoundland, where the previous census was in 1945, recorded a 12.3% increase in population.

== Population by religion ==
Denomination	Population	% of total
Roman Catholic	6,069,496	43.3%
United Church	2,867,271	20.5%
Anglican	2,060,720	14.7%
Presbyterian	781,747	5.6%
Baptist	519,585	3.7%
Lutheran	444,923	3.2%
Jewish	204,836	1.5%
Ukrainian (Greek) Catholic	190,831	1.4%
Greek Orthodox	172,271	1.2%
Mennonite	125,938	0.9%
Pentecostal	95,131	0.7%
Salvation Army	70,275	0.5%
Evangelical	50,900	0.4%
Jehovah's Witnesses	34,596	0.2%
Mormon	32,888	0.2%
No religion	59,679	0.4%
Other/not recorded	260,625	1.9%

== Population by Ethnicity ==
Ethnicity	Population	% of total
French	4,319,167	30.83%
English	3,630,344	25.91%
Scottish	1,547,470	11.05%
Irish	1,439,635	10.28%
German	619,995	4.43%
Ukrainian	395,043	2.82%
Dutch	264,267	1.89%
Polish	219,846	1.57%
Jewish	181,670	1.30%
Indigenous	165,607	1.18%
Italian	152,245	1.09%
Norwegian	119,266	0.85%
Swedish	97,780	0.70%
Other British Isles	92,236	0.66%
Russian	91,279	0.65%
Czech and Slovak	63,959	0.46%
Hungarian	60,460	0.43%
Finnish	43,745	0.31%
Danish	42,671	0.30%
Belgian	35,148	0.25%
Chinese	32,528	0.23%
Austrian	32,231	0.23%
Romanian	23,601	0.17%
Icelandic	23,307	0.17%
Japanese	21,663	0.15%
Yugoslav	21,404	0.15%
African	18,020	0.13%
Lithuanian	16,224	0.12%
Greek	13,966	0.10%
Syrian	12,301	0.09%
Estonian	9,818	0.07%
Latvian	9,214	0.07%
South Asian	2,148	0.02%
Other and Not Stated	191,171	1.36%

== See also ==
- Population and housing censuses by country
