= 1941 Canadian census =

← 1936	June 2, 1941	1946 →

General information
- Country: Canada

Results
- Total population: 11,506,655 (▲10.9%)

The Canada 1941 census was a detailed enumeration of the Canadian population. The total population count was 11,506,655, representing a 10.9% increase over the 1931 census population count of 10,376,786. The 1941 census was the eighth comprehensive decennial census since Canadian Confederation on July 1, 1867. The previous census was the Northwest Provinces of Alberta, Saskatchewan, and Manitoba 1936 census and the following census was the Northwest Provinces of Alberta, Saskatchewan, and Manitoba 1946 census.

The final report of this census was published on December 15, 1948, more than seven years after the census was taken. In line with legislation under the Statistics Act, detailed information from this census should become available to the public in 2033, 92 years after the census was collected.

== Population by province ==
Province	1941 census	1931 census	Difference	% change
Prince Edward Island	95,047	88,038	7,009	8.0%
Nova Scotia	577,962	512,846	65,116	12.7%
New Brunswick	457,401	408,219	49,182	12.0%
Quebec	3,331,882	2,874,662	457,220	15.9%
Ontario	3,787,655	3,431,683	355,972	10.4%
Manitoba	729,744	700,139	29,605	4.2%
Saskatchewan	895,992	921,785	-25,793	-2.8%
Alberta	796,169	731,605	64,564	8.8%
British Columbia	817,861	694,263	123,598	17.8%
Yukon Territory	4,914	4,230	684	16.2%
Northwest Territories	12,028	9,316	2,712	29.1%
Total	11,506,655	10,376,786	1,129,869	10.9%

For the second consecutive decade, British Columbia experienced the highest growth rate of the provinces, while Quebec added the largest number of new residents. Only Saskatchewan, reeling from the Great Depression and the Dust Bowl, experienced population decline.

== See also ==
- Population and housing censuses by country
