= 1916 Canadian census =

Special census in Alberta, Saskatchewan, and Manitoba

- June 1, 1916

General information
- Country: Canada

Results
- Total population: 8,001,000 (estimate)

The 1916 Canadian census was the second of a series of special censuses conducted by the Government of Canada covering the rapidly expanding Northwest Provinces of Alberta, Saskatchewan, and Manitoba. These censuses were conducted every ten years from 1906 to 1946. This census was conducted as at June 1, 1916.

It was the ninth census for Manitoba and the third census for Saskatchewan and Alberta. Three documents, known as schedules, were used to collect data: Schedule 1 for Population; Schedule 2 for Farm Property, Field Crops, Animals and Animal Products; and Schedule 3 for Domestic Animals, Dairy Products. Information for 1,686,666 individuals was collected by enumerators as follows: Manitoba 548,831; Saskatchewan 642,484; Alberta 495,351.

The entire population of Canada for 1916 was estimated at 8,001,000, an increase of 0.3% over the previous year.

The paper records of responses were microfilmed and the original paper forms were destroyed. Only Schedule 1 was preserved. The microfilm has since been scanned and converted into a series of images which are now available online at the Library and Archives Canada web site.

The previous census was the nationwide 1911 census and the following census was the nationwide 1921 census.

== See also ==
- Population and housing censuses by country
