= 1921 Canadian census =

- June 1, 1921

General information
- Country: Canada

Results
- Total population: 8,788,483 (▲22%)

The Canada 1921 census was a detailed enumeration of the Canadian population. The census count was taken as at June 1, 1921. The total population count was 8,788,483 representing a 22% increase over the 1911 census population count of 7,206,643. The 1921 census was the sixth comprehensive decennial census since Canadian Confederation on July 1, 1867. The previous census was the Northwest Provinces of Alberta, Saskatchewan, and Manitoba 1916 census and the following census was the Northwest Provinces of Alberta, Saskatchewan, and Manitoba 1926 census.

== Census summary ==
Information was collected on the following five subjects, with separate schedules or questionnaires for each subject:

1. Population
2. Agriculture
3. Animals, animal products, fruits not on farms
4. Manufacturing and trading establishments
5. Supplemental questionnaire for persons who were blind and deaf.

The five schedules contained a total of 565 questions. The population questionnaire contained 35 questions with those on insanity and fertility having been dropped and a new question recording the birthplaces of the father and mother of each individual.

== Population by province ==
Province	1921 census	1911 census	% change
Prince Edward Island	88,615	93,728	-5.5
Nova Scotia	523,837	492,338	6.4
New Brunswick	387,876	351,889	10.2
Quebec	2,361,199	2,005,776	17.7
Ontario	2,933,622	2,527,292	16.1
Manitoba	610,118	461,394	32.2
Saskatchewan	757,510	492,432	53.8
Alberta	588,454	374,295	57.2
British Columbia	524,582	392,480	33.7
Yukon Territory	4,157	8,512	-51.2
Northwest Territories	7,988	6,507	22.8
Royal Canadian Navy	485	0	N/A
Total	8,788,483	7,206,643	22.0

The most significant population growth took place in the Prairie provinces of Manitoba, Saskatchewan and Alberta, where the population count increased by 47%. This was also the only census in Canadian history where the Royal Canadian Navy was separately enumerated.

== Methodology ==
The census was conducted by the Dominion Bureau of Statistics formed in 1918 by the Statistics Act. Census fieldwork was carried out by 241 commissioners and 11,425 enumerators responsible for the corresponding numbers of census districts and subdistricts structured to correspond closely to federal electoral constituencies and polling subdivisions respectively. A special staff of up to 350 in Ottawa compiled the census results using mechanical tabulation methods. In 1955, the paper census schedules were destroyed after the population schedules were microfilmed.

== Release date and format ==
In accordance with the Statistics Act, the 1921 census returns were in the custody of Statistics Canada and the records were closed until 92 years after the taking of the census. In 2013, the records were opened for public use and transferred to Library and Archives Canada (LAC). In early July 2013, a spokesperson for LAC advised that the data comprises 197,529 images, and "Once assembled and fully indexed, it will constitute the largest on-line record of Canadian genealogical information." On August 8, 2013, raw digital images of the population schedules were made available to browse for free with a geographic index of districts and sub-districts on the private Ancestry.ca website. Ancestry.ca transcribed and indexed the data to facilitate advanced searches by individual Ancestry.ca subscribers, and in person at LAC and subscribing libraries, from late in 2013. The census data was scheduled to be made available on the LAC website three years after being made available on the Ancestry.ca website. The fully indexed online census data was launched by Ancestry.ca on October 29, 2013. The data is free to search, subject to registration on the Ancestry.ca website. On August 30, 2017, the results of the 1921 census were made available on the Library and Archives Canada website.

== See also ==
- Population of Canada by year
- Demographics of Canada
- Ethnic groups in Canada
- History of immigration to Canada
- Population and housing censuses by country
