= 1926 Canadian census =

Special census in Alberta, Saskatchewan, and Manitoba

- June 1, 1926

General information
- Country: Canada

Results
- Total population: 9,451,000 (estimate)

The 1926 Canadian census was the third of a series of special censuses conducted by the Government of Canada covering the rapidly expanding Northwest Provinces of Alberta, Saskatchewan, and Manitoba. These censuses were conducted every ten years from 1906 to 1946. This census was conducted as at June 1, 1926.

The entire population of Canada for 1926 was estimated at 9,451,000, an increase of 1.7% over the previous year.

Canada's Statistics Act legislation does not permit the release of personal information until 92 years have elapsed, meaning that detailed information from this census was due for release in 2018. As of February 2019, census data was available on the Library and Archives of Canada website.

The previous census was the nationwide 1921 census and the following census was the nationwide 1931 census.

== See also ==
- Population and housing censuses by country
