= 1936 Canadian census =

← 1931	June 1, 1936	1941 →

General information
- Country: Canada

Results
- Total population: 10,950,000 (estimate)

The 1936 Canadian census was the fourth of a series of special censuses conducted by the Government of Canada covering the rapidly expanding Northwest Provinces of Alberta, Saskatchewan, and Manitoba. These censuses were conducted every ten years from 1906 to 1946. This census was conducted as at June 1, 1936.

The entire population of Canada for 1936 was estimated at 10,950,000, an increase of 1.0% over the previous year. The Northwest Provinces had 2,415,545 people in this census, of which Alberta had 772,782, Saskatchewan 931,547, and Manitoba 711,216. Due to the Dust Bowl, Saskatchewan would not return to this population peak until 1966.

Canada's Statistics Act legislation does not permit the release of personal information until 92 years have elapsed. Detailed information from this census is not due for release until 2028.

The previous census was the nationwide 1931 census and the following census was the nationwide 1941 census.

== See also ==
- Population and housing censuses by country
