= 1931 Canadian census =

Detailed enumeration of Canadian residents in 1931

- June 1, 1931

General information
- Country: Canada

Results
- Total population: 10,376,379 (▲17.9%)

The Canada 1931 census was a detailed enumeration of Canada's population. The census count was taken as at June 1, 1931. The total population count was 10,376,379 representing a 17.9% increase over the 1911 census population count of 8,800,249. The 1931 census was the seventh comprehensive decennial census since Canadian Confederation on July 1, 1867.

The previous census was the Northwest Provinces of Alberta, Saskatchewan, and Manitoba 1926 census and the following census was the Northwest Provinces of Alberta, Saskatchewan, and Manitoba 1936 census.

This census was released to the public on June 1, 2023, 92 years after the census data was collected.

== Population by province ==
Province	1931 census	1921 census	Difference	% change
Prince Edward Island	88,038	88,615	-577	-0.7%
Nova Scotia	512,846	523,837	-10,991	-2.1%
New Brunswick	408,219	387,876	20,343	5.2%
Quebec	2,874,662	2,361,199	514,152	21.8%
Ontario	3,431,683	2,933,622	498,021	17.0%
Manitoba	700,139	610,118	90,021	14.8%
Saskatchewan	921,785	757,510	164,275	21.7%
Alberta	731,605	588,454	143,151	24.3%
British Columbia	694,263	524,582	169,681	32.3%
Yukon Territory	4,230	4,157	73	1.8%
Northwest Territories	9,316	7,988	1,173	14.4%
Royal Canadian Navy	0	485	N/A	N/A
Total	10,376,786	8,788,483	1,588,837	18.1%

This was the first census in which Canada had more than 10 million people. The highest growth rate was in British Columbia, while Quebec added the largest number of new residents. Only Prince Edward Island and Nova Scotia experienced a decline in population.

== See also ==
- Population and housing censuses by country
