= Fort William, Ontario =

Former city in Ontario

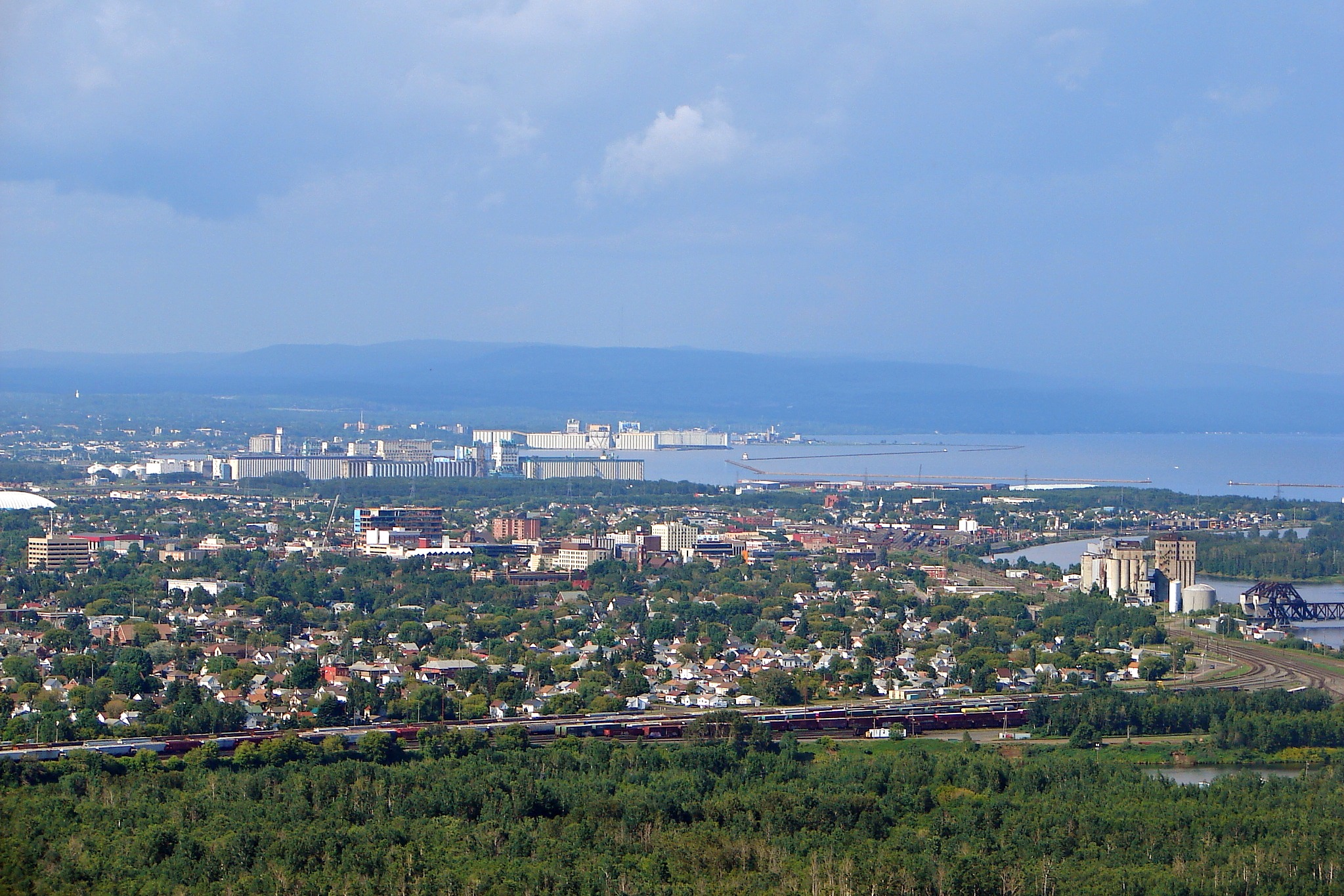
- Skyline of part of Fort William

- Location within Ontario
- Coordinates: 48°22′48″N 89°16′48″W

Fort William was a city in Ontario, Canada, located on the Kaministiquia River, at its entrance to Lake Superior. Incorporated as a town in 1892 and as a city in 1907, it was amalgamated with Port Arthur and the townships of Neebing and McIntyre to form the city of Thunder Bay in January 1970.

== Coat of arms and motto ==
The city's Latin motto was A posse ad esse (From a possibility to an actuality), featured on its coat of arms designed in 1900 by town officials, "On one side of the shield stands an Indian dressed in the paint and feathers of the early days; on the other side is a French voyageur; the cent[re] contains a grain elevator, a steamship and a locomotive, while the beaver surmounts the whole."

== History ==
Federal census population history of Fort William
Year	Pop.	±%
1881	690	—
1891	2,176	+215.4%
1901	3,633	+67.0%
1911	16,499	+354.1%
1921	20,541	+24.5%
1931	26,277	+27.9%
1941	30,585	+16.4%
1951	34,947	+14.3%
1956	39,464	+12.9%
1961	45,214	+14.6%
1966	48,208	+6.6%
Source: Statistics Canada

=== Fur trade era 1671–1884 ===
Fort William and Grand Portage were the two starting points for the canoe route from the Great Lakes to Western Canada. For details of the route inland see Kaministiquia River.

==== French regime (Fort Kamanistigouian, Caministogoyan) ====
Kamanistigouian, as a place, is first mentioned in a decree of the Conseil Souverain de la Nouvelle-France dated 23 August 1681 instructing one of two canoes to make known the king's amnesty to coureurs de bois, although the Kaministiquia River is depicted on the 1671 "Carte des Jésuites" as "R. [rivière] par où l'on va aux Assinipoualacs à 120 lieues vers le Nord-Ouest." In late 1683 or spring 1684, the adventurer Daniel Greysolon, Sieur du Lhut established a trading post near the mouth of the Kaministiquia River. French authorities closed this post in 1696 because of a glut on the fur market. In 1717, a new post, Fort Kaministiquia, was established at the river mouth by Zacharie Robutel de la Noue. This post appears on 18th century French maps by Royal hydrographer Jacques-Nicolas Bellin as "Fort Caministogoyan". The post was abandoned in 1758 or 1760 during the British conquest of New France.

==== English regime (North West Company Fort William, 1803–1821) ====
The fur trade was quickly re-established with most people using Grand Portage. By 1784, Montreal merchants and their "wintering partners" had formed the North West Company (Nor'Westers). The North West Company continued to use Grand Portage as their centre of operations after the area was ceded to the United States after the colonists' victory in the American Revolution. Following the signing of the Jay Treaty of 1794 between Great Britain and the United States, which acknowledged American control of the area, the North West Company required a new midway transshipment point between their inland posts and Montreal. The partners needed to meet and exchange furs and supplies without being subject to American taxation.

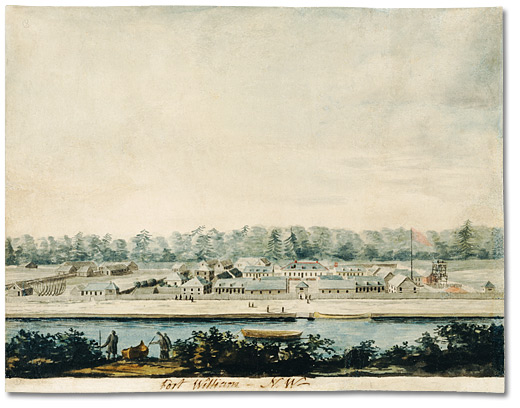
Fort William in 1811

In 1803, the Nor'Westers abandoned Grand Portage and established a new fur trading post on the Kaministiquia River on land acquired from the Ojibwe by written agreement dated 30 July 1798. The post was named Fort William in 1807 after William McGillivray, chief director of the North West Company from 1804-1821.

==== Hudson's Bay Company 1821–1884 ====
After the union of the North West Company with the Hudson's Bay Company (HBC) in 1821, the fort lost its raison d'être because most trade shifted to York Factory on Hudson Bay. It became a minor HBC fur trading post. The original site disappeared under development of Canadian Pacific Railway railroad tracks and coal piles in the 1880s. A replica of the Fort William post was built further upstream on the Kaministiquia River at Pointe de Meuron, a Hudson Bay Company post, later used as a military staging location named after Lord Selkirk's Swiss de Meuron Regiment. It is now known as the Fort William Historical Park.

==== Surveying and municipal incorporation 1859–1892 ====
Two townships (Neebing and Paipoonge) and the Fort William Town Plot were surveyed in 1859–1860 by the Province of Canada's Department of Crown Lands (surveyor Thomas Wallis Herrick) and opened to purchase in 1861. A large section of land adjacent to the Hudson's Bay Company post was set aside as the Hudson's Bay Company Reserve, and remained in dispute until 1875, when it was surveyed as Neebing Additional Township. Vickers Street (named after absentee landowner John Joseph Vickers of Toronto) is the dividing line between Neebing Township and Neebing Additional Township.

Most land was acquired by absentee landowners speculating on the decision of the new Dominion of Canada to build a railway to the Pacific that would begin somewhere along the north shore of Lake Superior. The selection of the Fort William Town Plot (later known as West Fort) as the eastern terminus for the CPR stimulated development, as did the construction of the railway, begun in June 1875. Under Prime Minister Alexander Mackenzie, the federal Department of Public Works, and later under Prime Minister John Alexander Macdonald, the Department of Railways and Canals, took seven years (1875–1882) to build the Thunder Bay Branch from Fort William to Winnipeg, Manitoba.

The Ontario Legislature incorporated the Municipality of Shuniah in March 1873. This early form of regional government comprised a vast area from Sibley Peninsula to the American border. For eight years the residents of Neebing and Neebing Additional townships battled Port Arthur residents for the Thunder Bay terminus. In March 1881, the inhabitants of Neebing and Neebing Additional petitioned the Ontario Legislature successfully to separate the southern townships from Shuniah and to create the Municipality of Neebing.

By 1883–1884, the Montreal-based CPR syndicate, in collaboration with the Hudson's Bay Company, clearly preferred the low-lying lands along the lower Kaministiquia River to the exposed shores of Port Arthur, which required an expensive breakwater if shipping and port facilities were to be protected from the waves. The CPR subsequently consolidated all its operations there, erecting rail yards, coal-handling facilities, grain elevators and a machine shop. In April 1892, Neebing Additional Township and parts of Neebing Township were incorporated as the town of Fort William. Fort William was incorporated as a city in April 1907. The city of Fort William ceased to exist at the end of December 1969.

== Politics and government to 1969 ==
From 1892 to 1937, Fort William was divided into four wards for electoral purposes.

== Neighbourhoods ==
The first area developed was the Fort William Town Plot and adjacent subdivision (Oliver Davidson Addition), renamed West Fort by the CPR. It lay between Empire Avenue and the Kaministiquia River. This was electoral Ward 4.

The next area to develop was the land in Neebing Additional Township owned by the McKellar and McVicar families that became the central business district (see John McKellar). It lay between Arthur Street and Dease Street. This became electoral Ward 2.

The third area was the East end, a large subdivision jointly developed by the Hudson Bay Company and the CPR in 1890. It lay between Dease Street and the Port Arthur boundary. This became electoral Ward 1.

The last area to develop was Ward 3, the area between Arthur Street and Empire Avenue. Until about 1956, this was the most prestigious area to live, containing the hospital, the two secondary schools, and Vickers Park.

In the postwar period 1945–1959, subdivisions were opened west of Vickers Park and the Canadian National Railway train tracks, such as the Green Acres subdivision (1956). Development of the Northwood subdivision, the area northwest of the Neebing River, began in 1960–61, and that of the Edgewater and Windsor Park subdivisions in 1964.

== Notable people ==
- Jack Adams, professional hockey player, coach and general manager
- Mary J. L. Black, first librarian of the Fort William Public Library
- Gus Bodnar, professional hockey player
- Larry Cahan, professional hockey player
- Marc Chorney, professional hockey player
- Joe Comuzzi, lawyer and cabinet minister
- Tom Cook, aka Tommy Cook, professional hockey player
- Alex Delvecchio, professional hockey player
- Jeff Heath, professional major league baseball player in the 1930s and 1940s
- Bora Laskin, Chief Justice of Canada
- Danny Lewicki, professional hockey player
- James Maloney, lawyer and politician
- Norman "Bud" Poile, professional hockey player and executive
- Paul Shaffer, musician, TV personality
- H. J. Sterling, president of the Canadian Amateur Hockey Association, Thunder Bay Amateur Hockey Association and the Fort William and Port Arthur Grain Exchange

== See also ==
- List of mayors of Fort William, Ontario
- Port Arthur, Ontario

== Cited sources ==
=== Bibliography and websites ===
- Morrison, Jean F. (2007) [2001], Superior rendez-vous place : Fort William in the Canadian fur trade (book) (2nd ed.), Toronto: Dundurn, ISBN 9781550027815, OCLC 47037457
- Morrison, Jean F., ed. Lake Superior to Rainy River : three centuries of fur trade history : a collection of writings. Thunder Bay, Ont. : Thunder Bay Historical Museum Society, 2003.
- Scollie, Frederick Brent. Biographical Dictionary and History of Victorian Thunder Bay (1850-1901). Thunder Bay: Thunder Bay Historical Museum Society, 2020.
- Thunder Bay from rivalry to unity / edited by Thorold J. Tronrud and A. Ernest Epp. Thunder Bay : Thunder Bay Historical Museum Society, 1995.
