= Demographics of Saskatchewan =

Population density of Saskatchewan, 2016

Saskatchewan is the middle province of Canada's three Prairie provinces. It has an area of 651,900 km^{2} (251,700 mi^{2}) and a population of 1,132,505 (Saskatchewanians) as of 2021. Saskatchewan's population is made of 50.3% women and 49.7% men. Most of its population lives in the Southern half of the province.

The most populous city is Saskatoon, with a population of 317,480 (2021) in the Census Metropolitan Area (CMA), followed by the province's capital, Regina, with a population of 249,217 (2021) in the CMA. The province's population makeup is also notable for German Canadians being the largest European ethnic group and for the second-largest proportion of people of indigenous descent of any of the provinces, after Manitoba.

== Population history ==
View chart definition.

Year	Population	Five-year % change	Ten-year % change	Rank among provinces
1901	91,279†	n/a	n/a	8
1911	492,432	n/a	439.5	3
1921	757,510	n/a	53.8	3
1931	921,785	n/a	21.7	3
1941	895,992	n/a	−2.8	3
1951	831,728	n/a	−7.2	5
1956	880,665	5.9	n/a	5
1961	925,181	5.1	11.2	5
1966	955,344	3.3	8.5	6
1971	926,242	−3.0	0.1	6
1976	921,325	−0.5	3.6	6
1981	968,313	5.1	4.5	6
1986	1,009,613	4.3	9.6	6
1991	988,928	−2.0	2.1	6
1996	976,615	−1.2	−3.3	6
2001	978,933	0.2	−1.0	6
2006	985,386	0.7	0.9	6
2011	1,053,960	7.0	7.6	6
2016	1,098,352	6.3	11.4	6
2021	1,132,505	3.5	7.5	6

† 1901 population for District of Saskatchewan and District of Athabasca, parts of the then-named North-West Territories.

Source: Statistics Canada.

== Ethnic origins ==
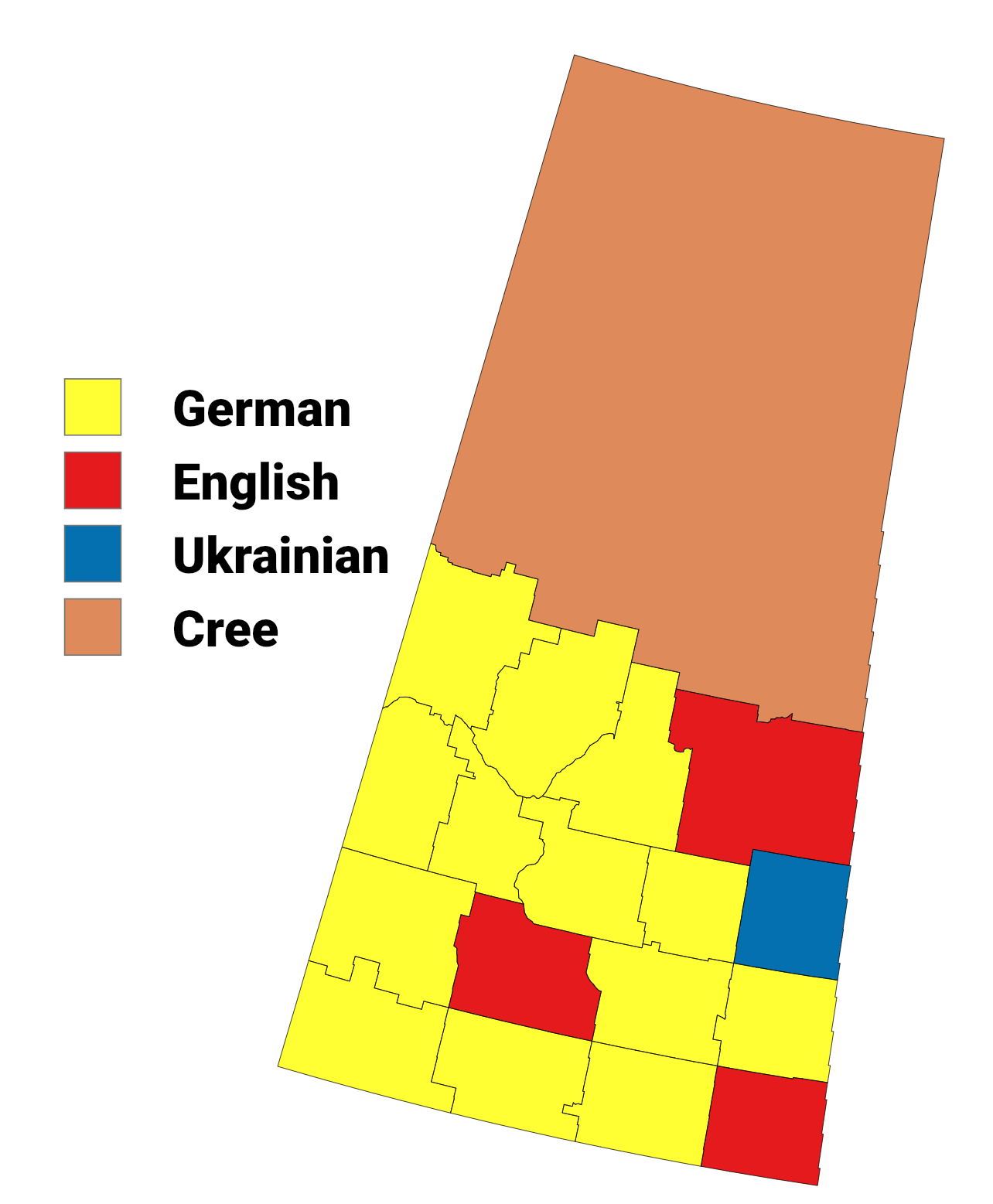
Largest ethnic origins by census division, 2021 census

Ethnic groups in Saskatchewan (1941–2021)
Ethnic group	2021		2001		1941	
Ethnic group	Pop.	%	Pop.	%	Pop.	%
German	272,475	24.7%	275,060	28.56%	130,258	14.54%
English	219,660	19.91%	235,715	24.47%	186,053	20.77%
Scottish	175,590	15.92%	172,300	17.89%	108,919	12.16%
Irish	145,415	13.18%	139,205	14.45%	95,852	10.7%
Ukrainian	138,705	12.57%	121,735	12.64%	79,777	8.9%
First Nations	129,225	11.71%	102,285	10.62%	13,384	1.49%
French	108,505	9.84%	109,800	11.4%	50,530	5.64%
Norwegian	70,215	6.36%	60,510	6.28%	38,213	4.26%
Métis	56,060	5.08%	40,110	4.16%	9,160	1.02%
Polish	55,600	5.04%	51,445	5.34%	27,902	3.11%
Filipino	40,160	3.64%	3,275	0.34%	—N/a	—N/a
Russian	35,920	3.26%	27,695	2.88%	25,933	2.89%
Swedish	31,960	2.9%	29,900	3.1%	20,961	2.34%
Dutch	29,410	2.67%	32,300	3.35%	35,894	4.01%
Hungarian	28,495	2.58%	24,340	2.53%	14,576	1.63%
Indian	20,755	1.88%	3,245	0.34%	2	0%
Chinese	19,965	1.81%	9,275	0.96%	2,545	0.28%
Austrian	17,690	1.6%	14,450	1.5%	10,655	1.19%
Welsh	17,605	1.6%	13,935	1.45%	6,950	0.78%
Romanian	12,415	1.13%	10,290	1.07%	7,093	0.79%
Italian	10,830	0.98%	7,565	0.79%	1,014	0.11%
Danish	10,585	0.96%	9,375	0.97%	6,027	0.67%
Total responses	1,103,200	97.41%	963,150	98.39%	895,992	100%
Total population	1,132,505	100%	978,933	100%	895,992	100%
Note: Totals greater than 100% due to multiple origin responses

=== Future projections ===
Panethnic origin projections in Saskatchewan (2031–2041)
Panethnic group	2031		2036		2041	
Panethnic group	Pop.	%	Pop.	%	Pop.	%
European (Note: Statistic includes all persons that did not make up part of a visible minority or an Indigenous identity.)	768,000	58.31%	751,000	54.46%	733,000	51.04%
Indigenous	246,000	18.68%	263,000	19.07%	279,000	19.43%
South Asian	94,000	7.14%	114,000	8.27%	133,000	9.26%
Southeast Asian (Note: Statistic includes total responses of "Filipino" and "Southeast Asian" under visible minority section on census.)	82,000	6.23%	99,000	7.18%	118,000	8.22%
East Asian (Note: Statistic includes total responses of "Chinese", "Korean", and "Japanese" under visible minority section on census.)	45,000	3.42%	51,000	3.7%	56,000	3.9%
African	45,000	3.42%	54,000	3.92%	64,000	4.46%
Middle Eastern (Note: Statistic includes total responses of "West Asian" and "Arab" under visible minority section on census.)	19,000	1.44%	23,000	1.67%	27,000	1.88%
Latin American	9,000	0.68%	11,000	0.8%	13,000	0.91%
Other/multiracial (Note: Statistic includes total responses of "Visible minority, n.i.e." and "Multiple visible minorities" under visible minority section on census.)	10,000	0.76%	12,000	0.87%	14,000	0.97%
Projected Saskatchewan population	1,317,000	100%	1,379,000	100%	1,436,000	100%

== Visible minorities and Indigenous peoples ==
Indigenous and visible minority identity (2021):
1. European (68.5%)
2. Visible minority (14.4%)
3. First Nations (11.0%)
4. Métis (5.70%)
5. Other Indigenous (0.30%)

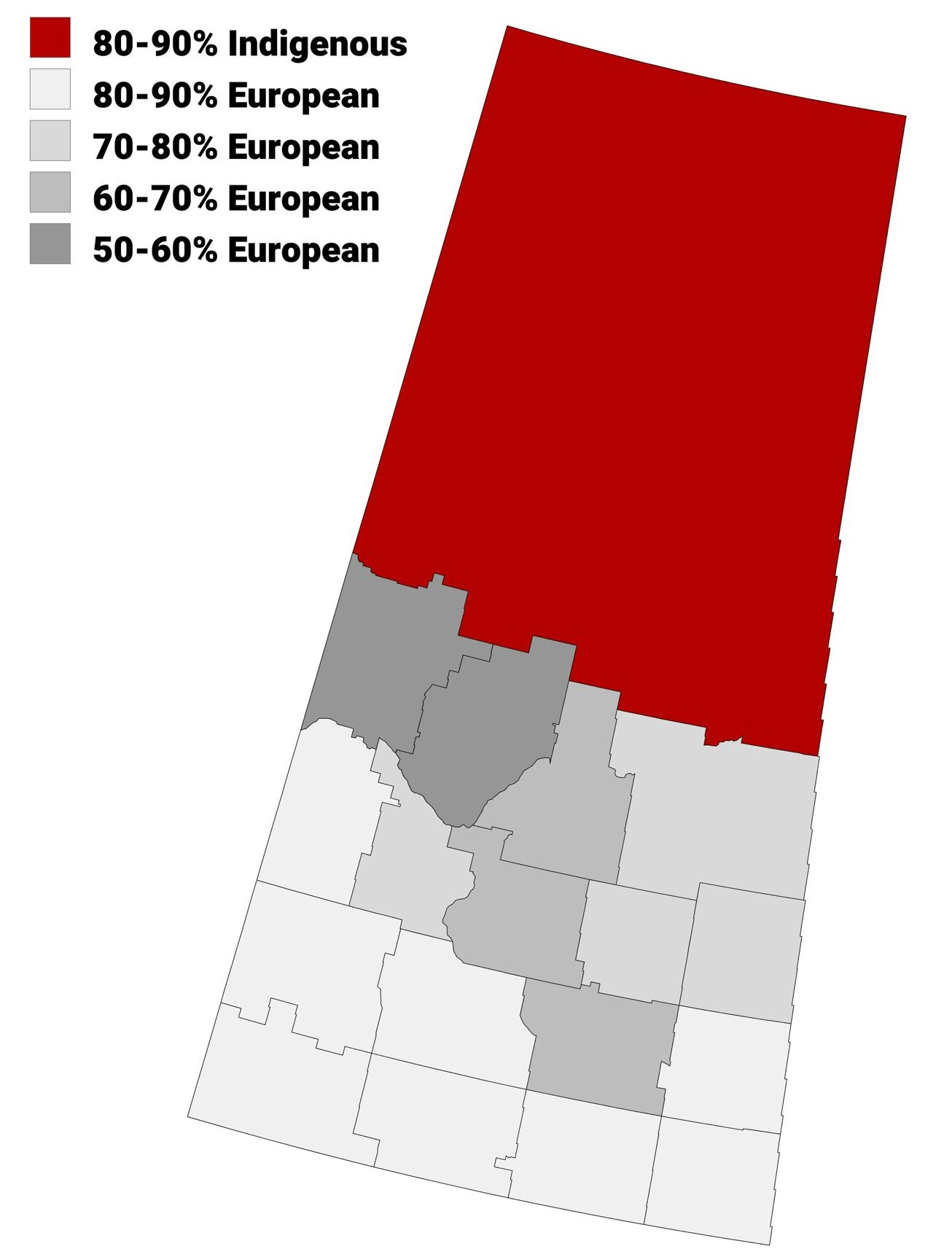
Largest panethnic groups in Saskatchewan by percentage of total population by census division, 2021 census

Visible minority & Indigenous population in Sasktachewan (1986–2021)
Group	Population	2021 census		2016 census		2011 census		2006 census		2001 census		1996 census		1991 census		1986 census	
Group	Population	Pop.	%	Pop.	%	Pop.	%	Pop.	%	Pop.	%	Pop.	%	Pop.	%	Pop.	%
Non-Indigenous / non-visible minority group	British Isles (Note: Including multiple responses.) (Note: 1996-present census populations for British Isles and French origins may be undercounts, due to the creation of the "Canadian" ethnic origin category. All citizens of Canada are classified as "Canadians" as defined by Canada's nationality laws. However, "Canadian" as an ethnic group has since 1996 been added to census questionnaires for possible ancestry. "Canadian" was included as an example on the English questionnaire and "Canadien" as an example on the French questionnaire. "The majority of respondents to this selection are from the eastern part of the country that was first settled. Respondents generally are visibly European (Anglophones and Francophones), however no-longer self identify with their ethnic ancestral origins. This response is attributed to a multitude or generational distance from ancestral lineage. Source 1: Jack Jedwab (April 2008). "Our 'Cense' of Self: the 2006 Census saw 1.6 million 'Canadian' Canadians Return to British and French origins" (PDF). Association for Canadian Studies. p. 2. Archived from the original (PDF) on October 2, 2011. "Virtually all persons who reported "Canadian" in 1996 had English or French as a mother tongue, were born in Canada and had both parents born inside Canada. This suggests that many of these respondents were people whose families have been in this country for several generations. In effect the "new Canadians" were persons that previously reported either British or French origins. Moreover in 1996 some 55% of people with both parents born in Canada reported Canadian (alone or in combination with other origins). By contrast, only 4% of people with both parents born outside Canada reported Canadian. Thus the Canadian response did not appeal widely to either immigrants or their children. Most important however was that nearly half of those persons reporting Canadian origin in 1996 were in Quebec this represented a majority of the mother tongue francophone population[...]In the 2001 Census, 11.7 million people, or 39% of the total population, reported Canadian as their ethnic origin, either alone or in combination with other origins. Some 4.9 million Quebecers out of 7.1 million individuals reported Canadian or "Canadien" thus accounting for nearly seven in ten persons (nearly eighty percent of francophones in Quebec)." Source 2: Don Kerr (2007). The Changing Face of Canada: Essential Readings in Population. Canadian Scholars' Press. pp. 313–317. ISBN 978-1-55130-322-2. Source 3: Jantzen (2006) Footnote 5: Note that Canadian and Canadien have been separated since the two terms mean different things. In English, it usually means someone whose family has been in Canada for multiple generations. In French it is referring to "Les Habitants", settlers of New France during the 17th and 18th centuries who earned their living primarily from agricultural labour. Source 4: Jantzen (2006): The reporting of French New World ancestries (Canadien, Québécois, and French-Canadian) is concentrated in the 4th+ generations; 79% of French-Canadian, 88% of Canadien and 90% of Québécois are in the 4th+generations category. Source 5: Jantzen (2005): According to Table 3, the 4th+ generations are highest because of a strong sense of belonging to their ethnic or cultural group among those respondents reporting the New World ancestries of Canadien and Québécois. Source 6: Jantzen (2006): For respondents of French and New World ancestries the pattern is different. Where generational data is available, it is possible to see that not all respondents reporting these ancestries report a high sense of belonging to their ethnic or cultural group. The high proportions are focused among those respondents that are in the 4th+ generations, and unlike with the British Isles example, the difference between the 2nd and 3rd generations to the 4th+ generation is more pronounced. Since these ancestries are concentrated in the 4th+ generations, their high proportions of sense of belonging to ethnic or cultural group push up the 4th+ generational results.)	403,755	36.6%	427,735	39.95%	427,820	42.41%	411,400	43.13%	387,495	40.23%	412,895	42.28%	470,710	48.23%	524,030	52.58%
Non-Indigenous / non-visible minority group	Western European	321,315	29.13%	336,710	31.45%	329,495	32.66%	325,755	34.15%	311,580	32.35%	320,990	32.87%	337,205	34.55%	324,515	32.56%
Non-Indigenous / non-visible minority group	Eastern European	227,060	20.58%	243,055	22.7%	236,315	23.43%	225,740	23.67%	207,050	21.5%	208,660	21.37%	209,370	21.45%	196,020	19.67%
Non-Indigenous / non-visible minority group	Northern European	119,355	10.82%	115,990	10.83%	116,495	11.55%	112,530	11.8%	101,350	10.52%	102,780	10.52%	90,190	9.24%	82,745	8.3%
Non-Indigenous / non-visible minority group	French	115,635	10.48%	126,530	11.82%	123,355	12.23%	118,500	12.42%	109,980	11.42%	114,925	11.77%	119,610	12.25%	117,980	11.84%
Non-Indigenous / non-visible minority group	Southern European	39,870	3.61%	27,420	2.56%	21,510	2.13%	19,625	2.06%	17,235	1.79%	16,625	1.7%	15,910	1.63%	13,265	1.33%
Non-Indigenous / non-visible minority group	European, n.i.e. & n.o.s.	13,315	1.21%	3,880	0.36%	3,945	0.39%	3,125	0.33%	2,780	0.29%	2,630	0.27%	3,845	0.39%	2,610	0.26%
Total non-Indigenous / non-visible minority population (Note: Single responses only unless otherwise specified.)		755,955	68.52%	779,665	72.83%	787,745	78.09%	778,065	81.57%	805,385	83.62%	840,125	86.02%	852,655	87.36%	895,740	89.87%
Visible minority (Note: Statistics Canada defines visible minorities as defined in the Employment Equity Act which defines visible minorities as "persons, other than Aboriginal peoples, who are non-Caucasian in race or non-white in colour".) group	South Asian	44,725	4.05%	29,960	2.8%	12,325	1.22%	5,130	0.54%	4,090	0.42%	3,795	0.39%	3,675	0.38%	4,170	0.42%
Visible minority group	Filipino	43,760	3.97%	32,340	3.02%	16,025	1.59%	3,770	0.4%	3,030	0.31%	2,925	0.3%	1,805	0.18%	1,290	0.13%
Visible minority group	Black	22,575	2.05%	14,925	1.39%	7,255	0.72%	5,090	0.53%	4,165	0.43%	4,265	0.44%	4,045	0.41%	3,050	0.31%
Visible minority group	Chinese	18,005	1.63%	15,540	1.45%	11,300	1.12%	9,505	1%	8,085	0.84%	8,830	0.9%	8,730	0.89%	8,170	0.82%
Visible minority group	Southeast Asian	8,540	0.77%	5,745	0.54%	4,915	0.49%	2,555	0.27%	2,600	0.27%	2,920	0.3%	2,335	0.24%	2,650	0.27%
Visible minority group	Latin American	5,685	0.52%	4,195	0.39%	3,255	0.32%	2,520	0.26%	2,005	0.21%	1,475	0.15%	1,270	0.13%	850	0.09%
Visible minority group	Arab	5,575	0.51%	4,300	0.4%	2,095	0.21%	1,710	0.18%	895	0.09%	—N/a	—N/a	—N/a	—N/a	—N/a	—N/a
Visible minority group	Multiple visible minorities	3,720	0.34%	2,815	0.26%	1,775	0.18%	810	0.08%	640	0.07%	585	0.06%	845	0.09%	520	0.05%
Visible minority group	West Asian	2,825	0.26%	2,065	0.19%	1,600	0.16%	1,020	0.11%	570	0.06%	—N/a	—N/a	—N/a	—N/a	—N/a	—N/a
Visible minority group	Korean	1,845	0.17%	1,880	0.18%	1,270	0.13%	735	0.08%	635	0.07%	305	0.03%	205	0.02%	50	0.01%
Visible minority group	Visible minority, n.i.e.	1,275	0.12%	1,150	0.11%	745	0.07%	405	0.04%	420	0.04%	240	0.02%	45	0%	80	0.01%
Visible minority group	Japanese	830	0.08%	955	0.09%	720	0.07%	645	0.07%	435	0.05%	420	0.04%	540	0.06%	550	0.06%
Visible minority group	Arab/West Asian	—N/a	—N/a	—N/a	—N/a	—N/a	—N/a	—N/a	—N/a	—N/a	—N/a	1,180	0.12%	2,215	0.23%	1,940	0.19%
Total visible minority population		159,360	14.45%	115,875	10.82%	63,275	6.27%	33,895	3.55%	27,580	2.86%	26,945	2.76%	25,710	2.63%	23,320	2.34%
Indigenous (Note: Statistics Canada defines Indigenous identity as persons who identify with the Indigenous Peoples of Canada.) group	First Nations	121,175	10.98%	114,570	10.7%	103,205	10.23%	91,400	9.58%	83,740	8.69%	72,830	7.46%	69,385 (Note: Including multiple Indigenous responses.)	7.11%	51,860	5.2%
Indigenous group	Métis	62,800	5.69%	57,875	5.41%	52,450	5.2%	48,115	5.04%	43,695	4.54%	35,855	3.67%	32,840	3.36%	22,290	2.24%
Indigenous group	Multiple Indigenous responses	2,030	0.18%	1,300	0.12%	670	0.07%	625	0.07%	900	0.09%	685	0.07%	—N/a	—N/a	3,385	0.34%
Indigenous group	Indigenous responses, n.i.e.	1,425	0.13%	910	0.09%	1,120	0.11%	1,530	0.16%	1,625	0.17%	—N/a	—N/a	—N/a	—N/a	—N/a	—N/a
Indigenous group	Inuk (Inuit)	460	0.04%	360	0.03%	290	0.03%	220	0.02%	230	0.02%	165	0.02%	540	0.06%	105	0.01%
Total Indigenous population		187,885	17.03%	175,020	16.35%	157,740	15.64%	141,890	14.88%	130,185	13.52%	109,545	11.22%	97,675	10.01%	77,640	7.79%
Total responses		1,103,200	97.41%	1,070,560	97.47%	1,008,760	97.62%	953,850	98.52%	963,150	98.39%	976,615	98.62%	976,040	98.7%	996,700	98.72%
Total population		1,132,505	100%	1,098,352	100%	1,033,381	100%	968,157	100%	978,933	100%	990,237	100%	988,928	100%	1,009,613	100%

== Languages ==
=== Knowledge of languages ===
Top languages known in Saskatchewan 2021 census (Note: The question on knowledge of languages allows for multiple responses. The following figures are from the 2021 Canadian census.)
Language	Percent
English	99.24%
French	4.72%
Tagalog	3.27%
Cree	2.25%
Hindi (Note: Note: Hindi and Urdu form mutually intelligible registers of the Hindustani language.)	1.43%
Chinese (Note: Including total responses to all Chinese languages and dialects.)	1.42%
Punjabi	1.21%
German (Note: Including total responses to all High German languages.)	1.08%
Spanish	1.01%
Ukrainian	0.98%

The question on knowledge of languages allows for multiple responses, and first appeared on the 1991 Canadian census. (Note: The 1991 Census was the first to ask Canadians whether they could conduct a conversation in a language other than English or French.)

Knowledge of Languages in Saskatchewan (1991–2021)
Language	2021 Canadian census		2016 Canadian census		2011 Canadian census		2006 Canadian census		2001 Canadian census		1996 Canadian census		1991 Canadian census	
Language	Pop.	%	Pop.	%	Pop.	%	Pop.	%	Pop.	%	Pop.	%	Pop.	%
English	1,094,785	99.24%	1,062,275	99.23%	1,012,490	99.43%	950,100	99.61%	959,645	99.64%	971,325	99.46%	969,870	99.37%
French	52,065	4.72%	51,325	4.79%	47,000	4.62%	47,935	5.03%	49,360	5.12%	51,115	5.23%	51,250	5.25%
Tagalog	36,125	3.27%	28,655	2.68%	14,440	1.42%	2,810	0.29%	2,275	0.24%	2,270	0.23%	1,445	0.15%
Cree (Note: Including total responses to all Cree–Innu language dialects.)	24,850	2.25%	27,065	2.53%	27,875	2.74%	30,250	3.17%	28,970	3.01%	30,000	3.07%	26,635	2.73%
Hindi	15,745	1.43%	8,040	0.75%	3,310	0.33%	1,370	0.14%	1,030	0.11%	1,150	0.12%	1,090	0.11%
Chinese	15,620	1.42%	13,630	1.27%	9,980	0.98%	8,320	0.87%	7,205	0.75%	7,190	0.74%	7,240	0.74%
Punjabi	13,315	1.21%	8,300	0.78%	3,250	0.32%	1,210	0.13%	925	0.1%	760	0.08%	640	0.07%
German	11,970	1.09%	17,730	1.66%	21,085	2.07%	31,695	3.32%	36,245	3.76%	42,180	4.32%	50,125	5.14%
Spanish	11,185	1.01%	9,605	0.9%	7,835	0.77%	6,530	0.68%	5,260	0.55%	4,120	0.42%	3,735	0.38%
Ukrainian	10,790	0.98%	13,090	1.22%	15,415	1.51%	20,355	2.13%	25,305	2.63%	30,870	3.16%	37,180	3.81%
Urdu	10,540	0.96%	9,455	0.88%	4,290	0.42%	640	0.07%	735	0.08%	405	0.04%	440	0.05%
Athabaskan–Dene	8,090	0.73%	9,120	0.85%	8,865	0.87%	7,805	0.82%	7,415	0.77%	7,320	0.75%	6,395	0.66%
Arabic	7,265	0.66%	5,605	0.52%	2,590	0.25%	2,290	0.24%	1,525	0.16%	1,035	0.11%	645	0.07%
Gujarati	6,970	0.63%	3,320	0.31%	765	0.08%	320	0.03%	310	0.03%	385	0.04%	300	0.03%
Russian	5,305	0.48%	5,275	0.49%	3,605	0.35%	2,270	0.24%	2,415	0.25%	2,590	0.27%	3,460	0.35%
Vietnamese	4,440	0.4%	3,105	0.29%	2,245	0.22%	1,675	0.18%	1,970	0.2%	2,090	0.21%	1,735	0.18%
Persian (Note: Including total responses to all Persian Language dialects.)	2,045	0.19%	1,630	0.15%	1,000	0.1%	885	0.09%	505	0.05%	390	0.04%	455	0.05%
Korean	1,870	0.17%	1,930	0.18%	1,185	0.12%	735	0.08%	465	0.05%	280	0.03%	180	0.02%
Polish	1,745	0.16%	2,185	0.2%	2,305	0.23%	3,065	0.32%	3,890	0.4%	4,545	0.47%	6,230	0.64%
Serbo-Croatian	1,705	0.15%	1,800	0.17%	1,205	0.12%	1,400	0.15%	1,480	0.15%	1,350	0.14%	385	0.04%
Greek	1,435	0.13%	1,470	0.14%	1,185	0.12%	1,390	0.15%	1,335	0.14%	1,555	0.16%	1,315	0.13%
Italian	1,395	0.13%	1,360	0.13%	1,125	0.11%	1,210	0.13%	1,495	0.16%	1,610	0.16%	1,590	0.16%
Portuguese	1,320	0.12%	885	0.08%	630	0.06%	735	0.08%	595	0.06%	650	0.07%	590	0.06%
Dutch	1,285	0.12%	1,510	0.14%	1,675	0.16%	2,030	0.21%	2,205	0.23%	2,635	0.27%	3,040	0.31%
Japanese	1,165	0.11%	1,205	0.11%	740	0.07%	760	0.08%	525	0.05%	485	0.05%	400	0.04%
Tamil	1,120	0.1%	635	0.06%	335	0.03%	390	0.04%	230	0.02%	295	0.03%	180	0.02%
Hungarian	1,055	0.1%	1,385	0.13%	1,675	0.16%	2,415	0.25%	2,990	0.31%	3,295	0.34%	4,210	0.43%
Scandinavian (Note: Total responses to all Scandinavian–North Germanic languages, including Danish, Icelandic, Norwegian, and Swedish.)	955	0.09%	1,035	0.1%	1,540	0.15%	1,855	0.19%	2,545	0.26%	3,795	0.39%	4,975	0.51%
Creoles	950	0.09%	495	0.05%	250	0.02%	100	0.01%	50	0.01%	60	0.01%	55	0.01%
Romanian	920	0.08%	1,105	0.1%	890	0.09%	930	0.1%	880	0.09%	1,210	0.12%	1,225	0.13%
Hebrew	470	0.04%	470	0.04%	435	0.04%	100	0.01%	90	0.01%	50	0.01%	165	0.02%
Finnish	175	0.02%	360	0.03%	280	0.03%	385	0.04%	520	0.05%	410	0.04%	540	0.06%
Total responses	1,103,205	97.4%	1,070,560	97.5%	1,018,315	96.6%	953,850	96.8%	963,150	98.4%	976,615	98.6%	976,040	98.7%
Total population	1,132,505	100%	1,098,352	100%	1,053,960	100%	985,386	100%	978,933	100%	990,237	100%	988,928	100%

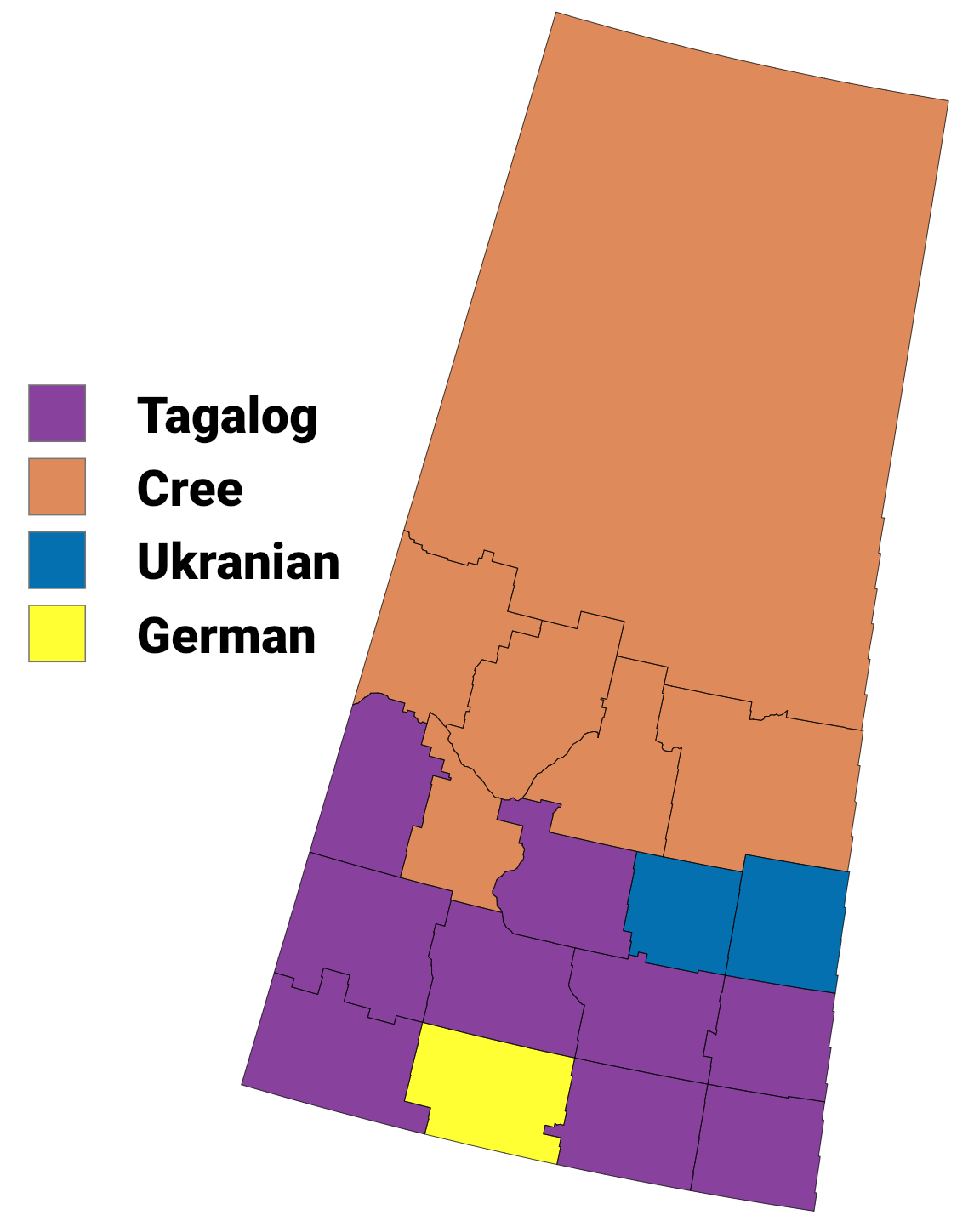
Largest non-official language known in Saskatchewan by census division, 2021 census

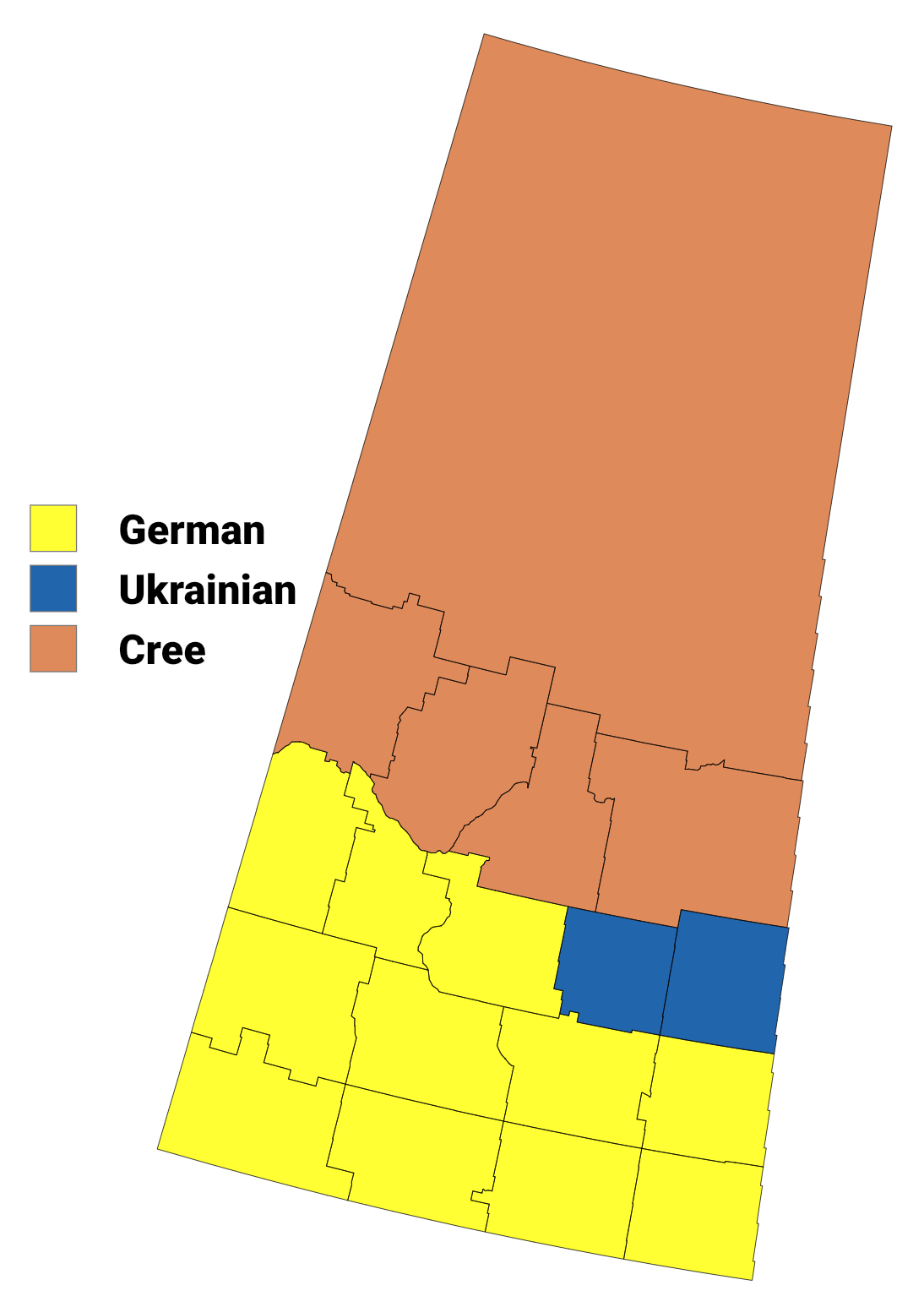
Largest non-official language known in Saskatchewan by census division, 2011 census

=== Mother tongue ===
Languages of Saskatchewan (2016):
1. English (82.4%)
2. French (1.40%)
3. Other language (14.5%)
4. Multiple (1.70%)

The 2006 census showed a population of 968,157. Of the 946,250 singular responses to the census question concerning mother tongue the languages most commonly reported were:

Mother tongue in Saskatchewan
Language	2006		2001		1931	
Language	Pop.	%	Pop.	%	Pop.	%
English	811,275	85.7%	817,955	85.8%	516,342	56.02%
German	28,555	3.0%	32,515	3.4%	138,499	15.03%
Algonquian languages	26,525	2.8%	23,735	2.5%	—N/a	—N/a
Cree	24,255	2.6%	22,055	2.1%	—N/a	—N/a
Ojibway	1,745	0.2%	1,375	0.1%	—N/a	—N/a
Ukrainian	16,350	1.7%	19,650	2.1%	70,545	7.65%
French	16,060	1.7%	17,775	1.9%	42,283	4.59%
Chinese	7,475	0.8%	6,015	0.6%	2,500	0.27%
Cantonese	1,720	0.2%	1,425	0.2%	—N/a	—N/a
Mandarin	715	0.1%	395	<0.1%	—N/a	—N/a
Athapaskan languages	7,145	0.8%	6,315	0.7%	—N/a	—N/a
Dene	7,135	0.8%	6,310	0.7%	—N/a	—N/a
Polish	2,510	0.4%	3,015	0.3%	18,742	2.03%
Hungarian	2,190	0.2%	2,700	0.3%	11,853	1.29%
Tagalog (Filipino/Pilipino)	2,170	0.2%	1,545	0.2%	—N/a	—N/a
Dutch	1,785	0.2%	1,930	0.20%	10,079	1.09%
Scandinavian languages	1,690	0.2%	2,320	0.2%	50,634	5.49%
Norwegian	830	0.1%	1,260	0.1%	27,996	3.04%
Danish	420	<0.1%	430	0.1%	3,882	0.42%
Swedish	355	<0.1%	525	0.1%	15,556	1.69%
Arabic	1,525	0.12%	1,090	0.11%	571	0.06%
Russian	1,400	0.2%	1,440	0.2%	17,085	1.85%
Vietnamese	1,305	0.1%	1,390	0.2%	—N/a	—N/a
Serbo-Croatian languages	1,250	0.1%	1,235	0.1%	956	0.1%
Croatian	450	0.1%	435	0.1%	—N/a	—N/a
Bosnian	335	<0.1%	N	N	—N/a	—N/a
Serbian	270	<0.1%	210	<0.1%	—N/a	—N/a
Serbo-Croatian	195	<0.1%	590	0.1%	—N/a	—N/a
Greek	1,060	0.1%	980	0.1%	370	0.04%
Panjabi (Punjabi)	850	0.1%	540	0.1%	7	0%
Persian	785	0.1%	415	<0.1%	—N/a	—N/a
Romanian	770	0.1%	775	0.1%	6,170	0.67%
Italian	735	0.1%	895	0.1%	692	0.08%
Korean	675	0.1%	425	<0.1%	—N/a	—N/a
Germanic languages n.i.e.	605	0.1%	375	<0.1%	8,619 (Note: Including Flemish (2,029), Austrian not otherwise specified (1,510), and Yiddish (5,011))	0.94%
Siouan languages (Dakota/Sioux)	410	<0.1%	345	<0.1%	—N/a	—N/a
African languages n.i.e.	405	<0.1%	130	0.01%	—N/a	—N/a
Portuguese	380	<0.1%	405	<0.1%	—N/a	—N/a
Finnish	365	<0.1%	435	<0.1%	1,861	0.2%
Hindi	355	<0.1%	320	<0.1%	—N/a	—N/a
Lao	340	<0.1%	275	0.03%	—N/a	—N/a
Urdu	330	<0.1%	425	<0.1%	—N/a	—N/a
Bantu languages	325	<0.1%	170	<0.1%	—N/a	—N/a
Swahili	105	<0.1%	110	<0.1%	—N/a	—N/a
Czech	325	<0.1%	415	<0.1%	1,156	0.13%
Berber	310	<0.1%	185	<0.1%	—N/a	—N/a
Japanese	290	<0.1%	185	<0.1%	1,070	0.12%
Niger–Congo languages n.i.e.	285	<0.1%	100	<0.1%	—N/a	—N/a
Tigrigna	215	<0.1%	190	<0.1%	—N/a	—N/a
Gujarati	210	<0.1%	225	0.02%	—N/a	—N/a
Slovak	210	<0.1%	100	<0.1%	1,156	0.13%
Somali	210	<0.1%	35	<0.1%	—N/a	—N/a
Bengali	190	<0.1%	70	<0.1%	—N/a	—N/a

Note: "n.i.e.": not included elsewhere

There were also 175 single-language responses for Non-verbal languages (Sign languages); 170 for Amharic; 155 for Turkish; 140 for Sinhala; 135 for Slavic languages n.i.e.; 130 for Slovenian; 120 for Pashto; 115 for Malay; 115 for Malayalam; 115 for Thai; 110 for Ilocano; 110 for Khmer; 100 for Celtic languages; and 100 for Sino-Tibetan languages n.i.e. In addition there were also 6,080 responses of both English and a non-official language; 245 of both French and a non-official language; 1,130 of both English and French; and 140 of English, French and a non-official language. Figures shown are for the number of single language responses and the percentage of total single-language responses.

== Religion ==
Religious groups in Saskatchewan (1981−2021)
Religious group	2021 Canadian census		2011 Canadian census		2001 Canadian census		1991 Canadian census		1981 Canadian census	
Religious group	Pop.	%	Pop.	%	Pop.	%	Pop.	%	Pop.	%
Christianity	621,250	56.31%	726,920	72.06%	795,935	82.64%	858,120	87.92%	889,820	93.03%
Irreligion	403,960	36.62%	246,305	24.42%	151,450	15.72%	107,225	10.99%	60,255	6.3%
Islam	25,455	2.31%	10,040	1%	2,230	0.23%	1,185	0.12%	1,120	0.12%
Indigenous spirituality	16,300	1.48%	12,240	1.21%	5,885	0.61%	1,995	0.2%	460	0.05%
Hinduism	14,150	1.28%	3,570	0.35%	1,590	0.17%	1,680	0.17%	1,150	0.12%
Sikhism	9,040	0.82%	1,650	0.16%	500	0.05%	565	0.06%	220	0.02%
Buddhism	4,410	0.4%	4,265	0.42%	3,055	0.32%	1,885	0.19%	985	0.1%
Judaism	1,105	0.1%	940	0.09%	865	0.09%	1,370	0.14%	1,585	0.17%
Other	7,540	0.68%	2,810	0.28%	1,640	0.17%	2,015	0.21%	845	0.09%
Total responses	1,103,205	97.41%	1,008,760	95.71%	963,150	98.39%	976,040	98.7%	956,440	98.77%
Total population	1,132,505	100%	1,053,960	100%	978,933	100%	988,928	100%	968,313	100%

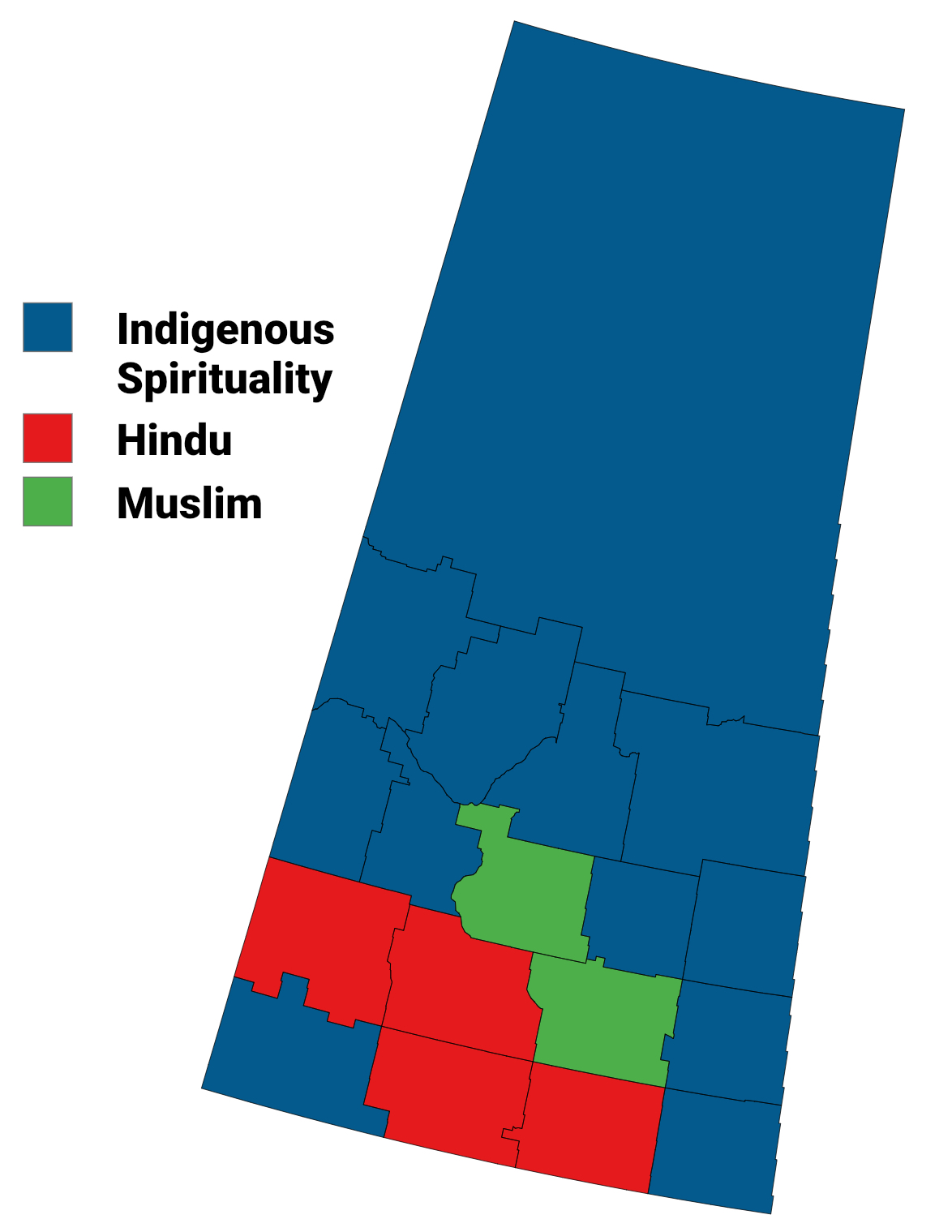
Largest non-Christian religion in Saskatchewan by census division, 2021 census

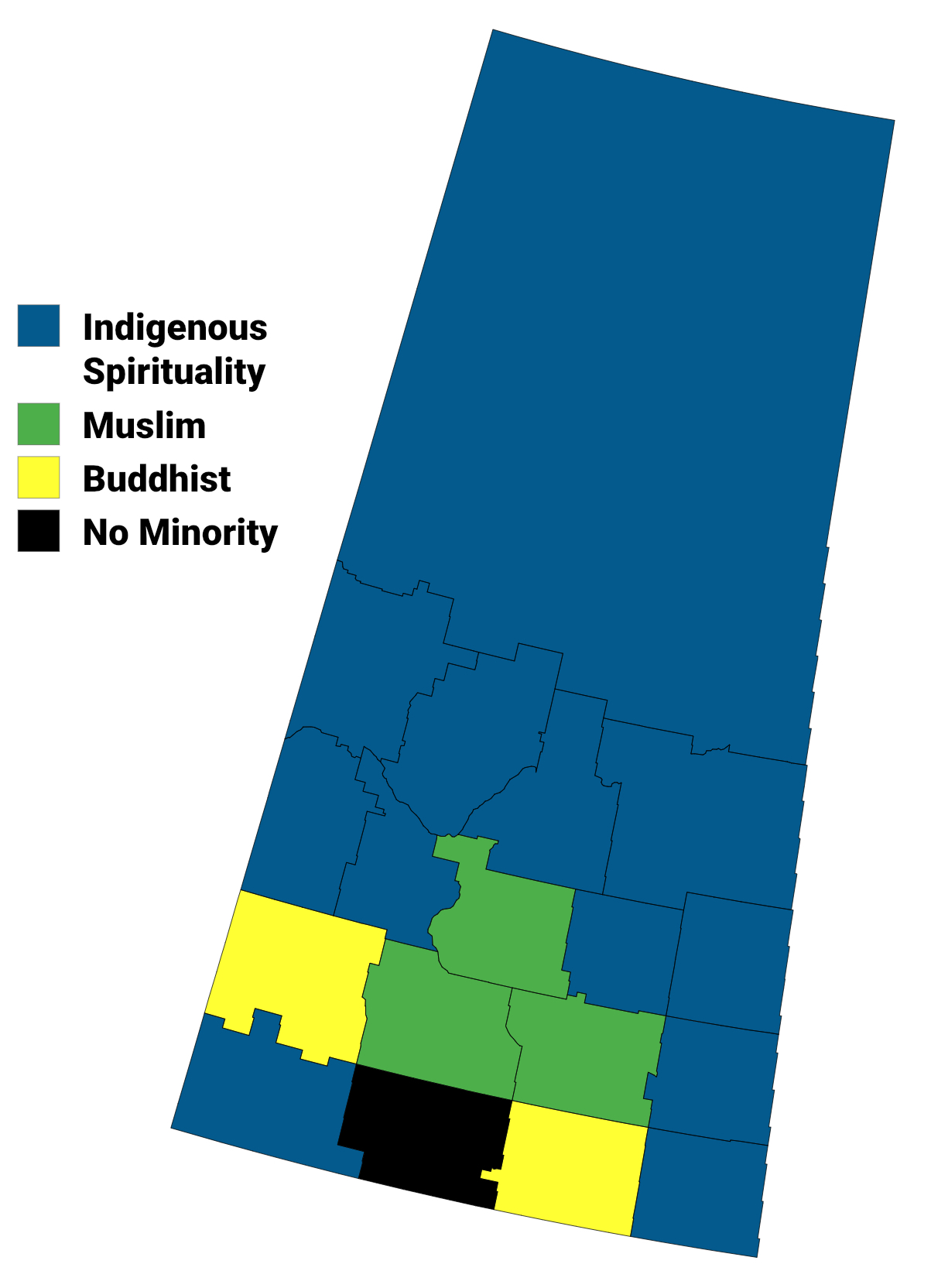
Largest non-Christian religion in Saskatchewan by census division, 2011 census

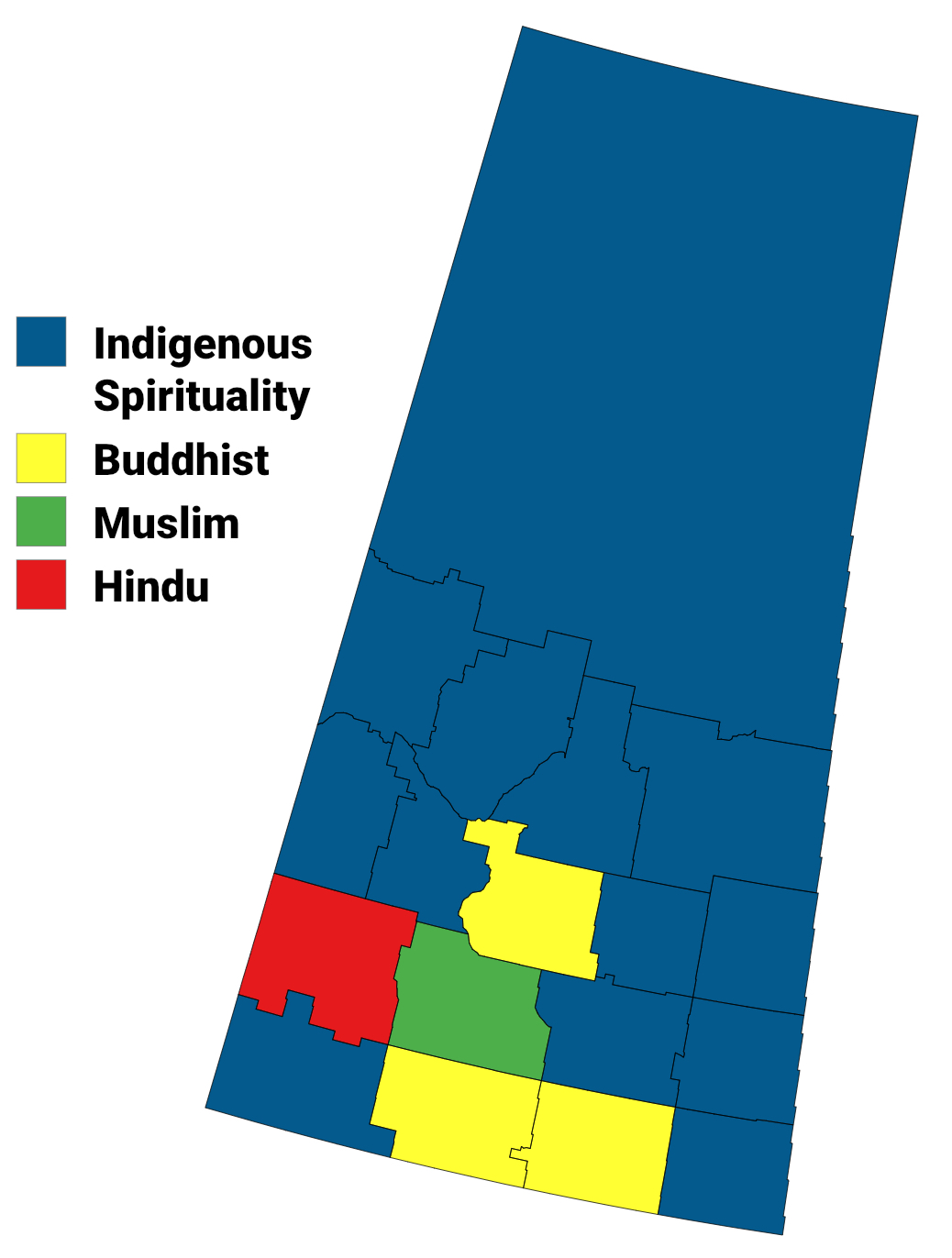
Largest non-Christian religion in Saskatchewan by census division, 2001 census

== Migration ==
=== Immigration ===
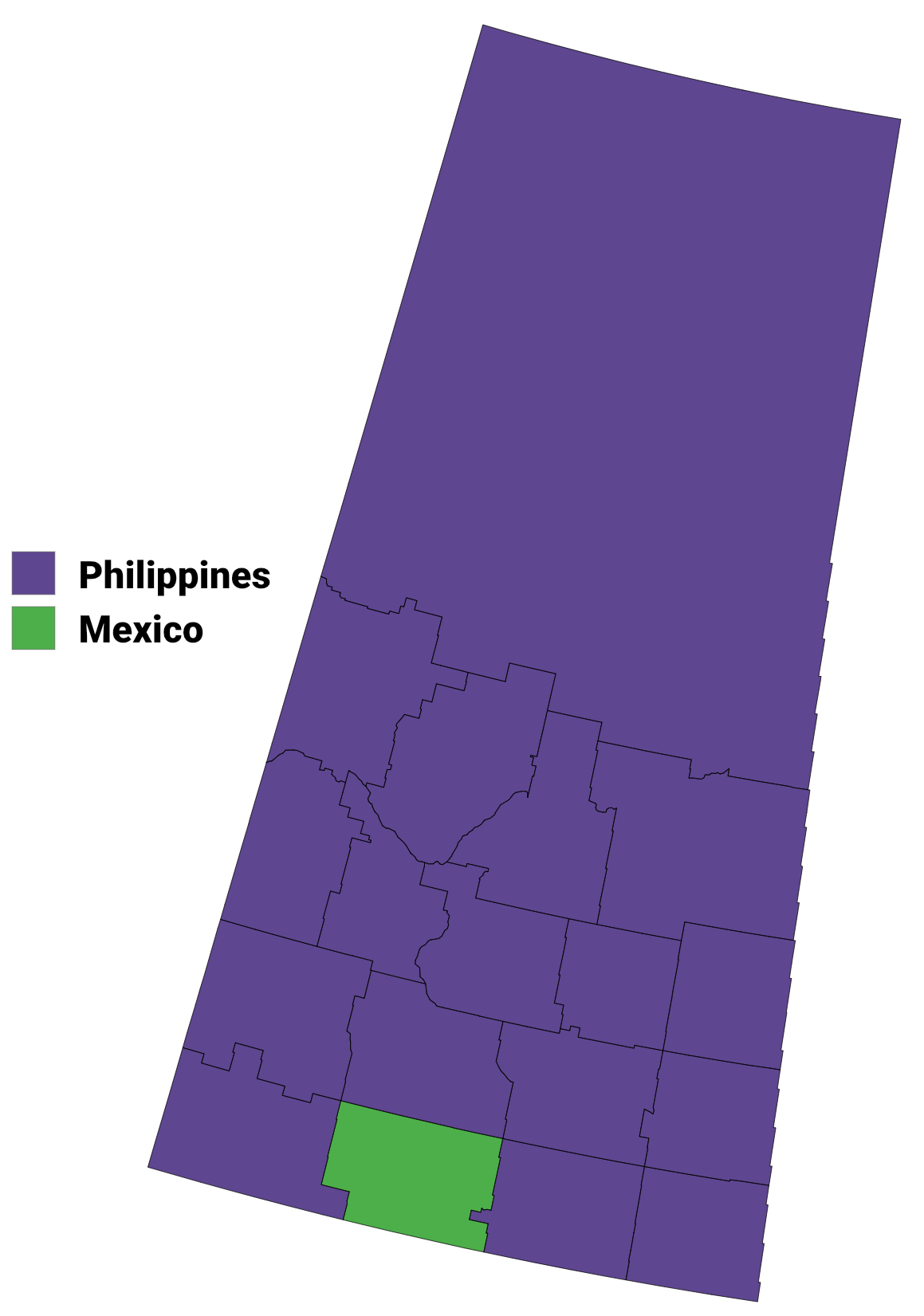
Largest nation of birth of immigrants by census division, 2021 census

Saskatchewan immigration statistics (1901–2021)
Census year	Immigrant percentage	Immigrant population	Total responses	Total population	Source(s)
1901 Canadian census	39.65%	36,195	91,279	91,279	
1911 Canadian census	49.49%	243,681	492,432	492,432	
1921 Canadian census	39.56%	299,677	757,510	757,510	
1931 Canadian census	34.56%	318,545	921,785	921,785	
1941 Canadian census	26.66%	238,903	895,992	895,992	
1951 Canadian census	21.14%	175,829	831,728	831,728	
1961 Canadian census	16.15%	149,389	925,181	925,181	
1971 Canadian census	11.95%	110,690	926,240	926,242	
1981 Canadian census	8.75%	83,655	956,440	968,313	
1986 Canadian census	7.22%	71,990	996,700	1,009,613	
1991 Canadian census	5.92%	57,815	976,040	988,928	
1996 Canadian census	5.36%	52,315	976,615	990,237	
2001 Canadian census	4.97%	47,825	963,150	978,933	
2006 Canadian census	5.05%	48,160	953,850	985,386	
2011 Canadian census	6.82%	68,780	1,008,760	1,053,960	
2016 Canadian census	10.51%	112,490	1,070,560	1,098,352	
2021 Canadian census	12.47%	137,620	1,103,205	1,132,505	

The 2021 census reported that immigrants (individuals born outside Canada) comprise 137,620 persons or 12.5 percent of the total population of Saskatchewan.

Immigrants in Saskatchewan by country of birth
Country of birth	2021 census		2016 census		2011 census		2006 census		2001 census		1996 census		1991 census		1986 census		1981 census		1971 census		1961 census		1951 census		1941 census		1931 census	
Country of birth	Pop.	%	Pop.	%	Pop.	%	Pop.	%	Pop.	%	Pop.	%	Pop.	%	Pop.	%	Pop.	%	Pop.	%	Pop.	%	Pop.	%	Pop.	%	Pop.	%
Philippines	35,955	26.1%	26,865	23.9%	12,775	18.6%	2,455	5.1%	2,065	4.3%	2,040	3.9%	1,255	2.2%	1,075	1.5%	900	1.1%	—N/a	—N/a	—N/a	—N/a	—N/a	—N/a	—N/a	—N/a	—N/a	—N/a
India	15,660	11.4%	9,630	8.6%	3,080	4.5%	1,685	3.5%	1,100	2.3%	1,460	2.8%	1,220	2.1%	1,665	2.3%	1,040	1.2%	830	0.7%	199	0.1%	119	0.1%	153	0.1%	233	0.1%
China & Taiwan	8,825 (Note: China: 8,650 / Taiwan: 175)	6.4%	7,670 (Note: China: 7,485 / Taiwan: 185)	6.8%	4,760 (Note: China: 4,625 / Taiwan: 135)	6.9%	3,600 (Note: China: 3,405 / Taiwan: 195)	7.5%	2,880 (Note: China: 2,730 / Taiwan: 150)	6%	2,980 (Note: China: 2,810 / Taiwan: 170)	5.7%	2,760 (Note: China: 2,725 / Taiwan: 35)	4.8%	2,795 (Note: China: 2,700 / Taiwan: 95)	3.9%	2,575 (Note: China: 1,300 / Taiwan: 1,275)	3.1%	2,335	2.1%	2,434	1.6%	1,742	1%	2,249	0.9%	3,335	1%
Pakistan	7,110	5.2%	6,860	6.1%	3,115	4.5%	330	0.7%	385	0.8%	170	0.3%	150	0.3%	205	0.3%	190	0.2%	95	0.1%	—N/a	—N/a	—N/a	—N/a	—N/a	—N/a	—N/a	—N/a
United Kingdom	6,785	4.9%	7,020	6.2%	7,370	10.7%	7,685	16%	8,450	17.7%	9,530	18.2%	11,740	20.3%	15,630	21.7%	18,945	22.6%	28,835	26.1%	38,218	25.6%	48,282	27.5%	66,761	27.9%	91,571	28.7%
Nigeria & Ghana	5,520 (Note: Nigeria: 5,030 / Ghana: 490)	4%	2,155 (Note: Nigeria: 1,700 / Ghana: 455)	1.9%	745 (Note: Nigeria: 540 / Ghana: 205)	1.1%	345 (Note: Nigeria: 235 / Ghana: 110)	0.7%	235 (Note: Nigeria: 95 / Ghana: 140)	0.5%	315 (Note: Nigeria: 140 / Ghana: 175)	0.6%	150	0.3%	140	0.2%	70	0.1%	—N/a	—N/a	—N/a	—N/a	—N/a	—N/a	—N/a	—N/a	—N/a	—N/a
United States	5,215	3.8%	4,845	4.3%	5,020	7.3%	5,425	11.3%	5,865	12.3%	7,205	13.8%	8,660	15%	12,920	17.9%	16,560	19.8%	23,785	21.5%	31,656	21.2%	39,482	22.5%	54,617	22.9%	73,008	22.9%
Vietnam	3,245	2.4%	2,620	2.3%	1,770	2.6%	1,295	2.7%	1,465	3.1%	1,810	3.5%	1,800	3.1%	2,280	3.2%	2,385	2.9%	—N/a	—N/a	—N/a	—N/a	—N/a	—N/a	—N/a	—N/a	—N/a	—N/a
Bangladesh	3,230	2.3%	2,575	2.3%	840	1.2%	60	0.1%	65	0.1%	50	0.1%	80	0.1%	55	0.1%	60	0.1%	—N/a	—N/a	—N/a	—N/a	—N/a	—N/a	—N/a	—N/a	—N/a	—N/a
Ukraine & Russia	3,820 (Note: Ukraine: 3,170 / Russia: 650)	2.3%	4,080 (Note: Ukraine: 3,280 / Russia: 800)	2.9%	2,425 (Note: Ukraine: 1,720 / Russia: 705)	2.5%	1,575 (Note: Ukraine: 1,055 / Russia: 520)	2.2%	2,105 (Note: Ukraine: 1,395 / Russia: 710)	2.9%	2,865 (Note: Includes total persons born in all republics of the Soviet Union.)	5.5%	3,765	6.5%	5,765	8%	7,875	9.4%	13,550	12.2%	18,364	12.3%	26,984	15.3%	27,596	11.6%	36,258	11.4%
Germany & Austria	2,220 (Note: Germany: 2,100 / Austria: 120)	1.5%	2,770 (Note: Germany: 2,575 / Austria: 195)	2.3%	2,865 (Note: Germany: 2,625 / Austria: 240)	3.8%	2,875 (Note: Germany: 2,675 / Austria: 200)	5.6%	3,275 (Note: Germany: 2,930 / Austria: 345)	6.1%	3,710 (Note: Germany: 3,220 / Austria: 490)	6.1%	4,430 (Note: Germany: 3,700 / Austria: 730)	6.4%	5,520 (Note: Germany: 4,345 / Austria: 1,175)	6%	7,425 (Note: Germany: 5,560 / Austria: 1,865)	8.9%	11,320	10.2%	18,448	12.3%	13,898	7.9%	18,917	7.9%	21,214	6.7%
South Africa	2,075	1.5%	1,775	1.6%	865	1.3%	720	1.5%	650	1.4%	485	0.9%	525	0.9%	290	0.4%	220	0.3%	—N/a	—N/a	82	0.1%	70	0%	111	0%	140	0%
Eritrea & Ethiopia	1,805 (Note: Eritrea: 1,025 / Ethiopia: 780)	0.7%	1,230 (Note: Eritrea: 595 / Ethiopia: 635)	0.5%	800 (Note: Eritrea: 230 / Ethiopia: 570)	0.3%	305 (Note: Eritrea: 170 / Ethiopia: 135)	0.4%	330 (Note: Eritrea: 225 / Ethiopia: 105)	0.5%	460	0.9%	300	0.5%	300	0.4%	—N/a	—N/a	—N/a	—N/a	—N/a	—N/a	—N/a	—N/a	—N/a	—N/a	—N/a	—N/a
Former Yugoslavia	1,745	1.3%	1,760	1.6%	1,230	1.8%	1,535	3.2%	1,650	3.5%	1,405	2.7%	755	1.3%	850	1.2%	920	1.1%	1,180	1.1%	1,420	1%	757	0.4%	1,097	0.5%	2,095	0.7%
Mexico	1,720	1.2%	1,330	1.2%	680	1%	235	0.5%	290	0.6%	280	0.5%	180	0.3%	280	0.4%	160	0.2%	—N/a	—N/a	—N/a	—N/a	—N/a	—N/a	—N/a	—N/a	—N/a	—N/a
Syria & Lebanon	1,630 (Note: Syria: 1,410 / Lebanon: 220)	1.2%	1,405 (Note: Syria: 1,155 / Lebanon: 250)	1.2%	315 (Note: Syria: 100 / Lebanon: 215)	0.5%	260 (Note: Syria: 45 / Lebanon: 215)	0.5%	125 (Note: Syria: 10 / Lebanon: 115)	0.3%	115 (Note: Syria: 10 / Lebanon: 105)	0.2%	135 (Note: Syria: 35 / Lebanon: 100)	0.2%	140 (Note: Syria: 25 / Lebanon: 115)	0.2%	80	0.1%	—N/a	—N/a	—N/a	—N/a	—N/a	—N/a	199	0.1%	298	0.1%
Jamaica & Trinidad and Tobago	1,560 (Note: Jamaica: 1,360 / Trinidad and Tobago: 200)	1.1%	1,030 (Note: Jamaica: 815 / Trinidad and Tobago: 215)	0.9%	665 (Note: Jamaica: 420 / Trinidad and Tobago: 245)	1%	415 (Note: Jamaica: 230 / Trinidad and Tobago: 185)	0.9%	490 (Note: Jamaica: 325 / Trinidad and Tobago: 165)	1%	520 (Note: Jamaica: 325 / Trinidad and Tobago: 195)	1%	610 (Note: Jamaica: 375 / Trinidad and Tobago: 235)	1.1%	595 (Note: Jamaica: 395 / Trinidad and Tobago: 200)	0.8%	755	0.9%	235	0.2%	173 (Note: All individuals born in the British West Indies.)	0.1%	49	0%	53	0%	92	0%
Iraq	1,440	1%	1,175	1%	780	1.1%	555	1.2%	425	0.9%	300	0.6%	65	0.1%	135	0.2%	—N/a	—N/a	—N/a	—N/a	—N/a	—N/a	—N/a	—N/a	—N/a	—N/a	—N/a	—N/a
Sudan & South Sudan	1,195	0.9%	940	0.8%	265	0.4%	665	1.4%	245	0.5%	120	0.2%	20	0%	5	0%	5	0%	—N/a	—N/a	—N/a	—N/a	—N/a	—N/a	—N/a	—N/a	—N/a	—N/a
South Korea	1,110	0.8%	1,125	1%	770	1.1%	425	0.9%	265	0.6%	180	0.3%	155	0.3%	70	0.1%	85	0.1%	—N/a	—N/a	—N/a	—N/a	—N/a	—N/a	—N/a	—N/a	—N/a	—N/a
Poland	1,080	0.8%	1,390	1.2%	1,310	1.9%	1,940	4%	2,405	5%	2,925	5.6%	4,185	7.2%	5,495	7.6%	6,345	7.6%	8,635	7.8%	10,455	7%	14,985	8.5%	24,026	10.1%	29,594	9.3%
Iran	1,040	0.8%	785	0.7%	575	0.8%	345	0.7%	310	0.6%	255	0.5%	275	0.5%	180	0.3%	65	0.1%	—N/a	—N/a	—N/a	—N/a	—N/a	—N/a	—N/a	—N/a	—N/a	—N/a
El Salvador & Guatemala & Nicaragua	955 (Note: El Salvador: 620 / Guatemala: 210 / Nicaragua: 125)	0.7%	915 (Note: El Salvador: 630 / Guatemala: 225 / Nicaragua: 60)	0.8%	790 (Note: El Salvador: 480 / Guatemala: 190 / Nicaragua: 120)	1.1%	810 (Note: El Salvador: 580 / Guatemala: 160 / Nicaragua: 70)	1.7%	610 (Note: El Salvador: 490 / Guatemala: 90 / Nicaragua: 30)	1.3%	660 (Note: El Salvador: 510 / Guatemala: 110 / Nicaragua: 40)	1.3%	445 (Note: El Salvador: 345 / Guatemala: 50 / Nicaragua: 50)	0.8%	235 (Note: El Salvador: 230 / Guatemala: 0 / Nicaragua: 5)	0.3%	50	0.1%	—N/a	—N/a	—N/a	—N/a	—N/a	—N/a	—N/a	—N/a	—N/a	—N/a
Netherlands	965	0.7%	1,220	1.1%	1,335	1.9%	1,355	2.8%	1,475	3.1%	1,615	3.1%	1,875	3.2%	1,930	2.7%	1,990	2.4%	2,055	1.9%	2,826	1.9%	1,314	0.7%	858	0.4%	1,225	0.4%
Kenya & Tanzania & Uganda	935 (Note: Kenya: 510 / Tanzania: 145 / Uganda: 280)	0.7%	675 (Note: Kenya: 425 / Tanzania: 170 / Uganda: 80)	0.6%	325 (Note: Kenya: 185 / Tanzania: 65 / Uganda: 75)	0.5%	460 (Note: Kenya: 250 / Tanzania: 55 / Uganda: 155)	1%	345 (Note: Kenya: 195 / Tanzania: 70 / Uganda: 80)	0.7%	250 (Note: Kenya: 100 / Tanzania: 40 / Uganda: 110)	0.5%	335 (Note: Kenya: 190 / Tanzania: 80 / Uganda: 65)	0.6%	400 (Note: Kenya: 185 / Tanzania: 125 / Uganda: 90)	0.6%	400	0.5%	—N/a	—N/a	—N/a	—N/a	—N/a	—N/a	—N/a	—N/a	—N/a	—N/a
Hong Kong	840	0.6%	770	0.7%	725	1.1%	885	1.8%	885	1.9%	1,290	2.5%	1,035	1.8%	1,085	1.5%	895	1.1%	—N/a	—N/a	—N/a	—N/a	—N/a	—N/a	—N/a	—N/a	—N/a	—N/a
DR Congo & Cameroon	830 (Note: DR Congo: 665 / Cameroon: 165)	0.6%	650 (Note: DR Congo: 460 / Cameroon: 190)	0.6%	185 (Note: DR Congo: 175 / Cameroon: 10)	0.3%	75 (Note: DR Congo: 75 / Cameroon: 0)	0.2%	65 (Note: DR Congo: 65 / Cameroon: 0)	0.1%	20 (Note: DR Congo: 10 / Cameroon: 10)	0%	40	0.1%	5	0%	5	0%	—N/a	—N/a	—N/a	—N/a	—N/a	—N/a	—N/a	—N/a	—N/a	—N/a
Egypt	805	0.6%	430	0.4%	220	0.3%	155	0.3%	130	0.3%	80	0.2%	115	0.2%	100	0.1%	95	0.1%	—N/a	—N/a	—N/a	—N/a	—N/a	—N/a	—N/a	—N/a	—N/a	—N/a
Myanmar	755	0.5%	560	0.5%	680	1%	110	0.2%	65	0.1%	25	0%	85	0.1%	80	0.1%	—N/a	—N/a	—N/a	—N/a	—N/a	—N/a	—N/a	—N/a	—N/a	—N/a	—N/a	—N/a
Ireland	720	0.5%	840	0.7%	370	0.5%	280	0.6%	345	0.7%	375	0.7%	510	0.9%	590	0.8%	365	0.4%	1,190	1.1%	3,584	2.4%	4,174	2.4%	5,795	2.4%	8,159	2.6%
Colombia	665	0.5%	555	0.5%	450	0.7%	125	0.3%	100	0.2%	10	0%	15	0%	15	0%	—N/a	—N/a	—N/a	—N/a	—N/a	—N/a	—N/a	—N/a	—N/a	—N/a	—N/a	—N/a
Romania	660	0.5%	695	0.6%	545	0.8%	750	1.6%	640	1.3%	630	1.2%	750	1.3%	815	1.1%	900	1.1%	1,445	1.3%	2,110	1.4%	2,911	1.7%	6,306	2.6%	10,598	3.3%
Australia & New Zealand	615	0.4%	570	0.5%	640	0.9%	365	0.8%	365	0.8%	265	0.5%	425	0.7%	510	0.7%	370	0.4%	340	0.3%	244	0.2%	149	0.1%	181	0.1%	310	0.1%
Thailand	605	0.4%	490	0.4%	380	0.6%	105	0.2%	140	0.3%	150	0.3%	100	0.2%	75	0.1%	—N/a	—N/a	—N/a	—N/a	—N/a	—N/a	—N/a	—N/a	—N/a	—N/a	—N/a	—N/a
Italy	585	0.4%	570	0.5%	530	0.8%	550	1.1%	705	1.5%	690	1.3%	790	1.4%	780	1.1%	1,050	1.3%	990	0.9%	897	0.6%	308	0.2%	316	0.1%	367	0.1%
Chile	565	0.4%	525	0.5%	585	0.9%	700	1.5%	610	1.3%	470	0.9%	850	1.5%	815	1.1%	495	0.6%	—N/a	—N/a	—N/a	—N/a	—N/a	—N/a	—N/a	—N/a	—N/a	—N/a
Greece	500	0.4%	605	0.5%	515	0.7%	650	1.3%	585	1.2%	720	1.4%	575	1%	600	0.8%	670	0.8%	450	0.4%	363	0.2%	154	0.1%	202	0.1%	272	0.1%
Somalia	485	0.4%	635	0.6%	370	0.5%	150	0.3%	50	0.1%	20	0%	0	0%	0	0%	—N/a	—N/a	—N/a	—N/a	—N/a	—N/a	—N/a	—N/a	—N/a	—N/a	—N/a	—N/a
Afghanistan	465	0.3%	515	0.5%	295	0.4%	310	0.6%	45	0.1%	10	0%	0	0%	60	0.1%	—N/a	—N/a	—N/a	—N/a	—N/a	—N/a	—N/a	—N/a	—N/a	—N/a	—N/a	—N/a
France & Belgium	445 (Note: France: 310 / Belgium: 135)	0.3%	355 (Note: France: 215 / Belgium: 140)	0.3%	365 (Note: France: 245 / Belgium: 120)	0.5%	365 (Note: France: 240 / Belgium: 125)	0.8%	395 (Note: France: 240 / Belgium: 155)	0.8%	560 (Note: France: 330 / Belgium: 230)	1.1%	675 (Note: France: 380 / Belgium: 295)	1.2%	825 (Note: France: 465 / Belgium: 360)	1.1%	1,095 (Note: France: 570 / Belgium: 525)	1.3%	1,670	1.5%	2,540	1.7%	2,999	1.7%	3,990	1.7%	5,125	1.6%
Laos & Cambodia	435 (Note: Laos: 300 / Cambodia: 135)	0.3%	500 (Note: Laos: 330 / Cambodia: 170)	0.4%	440 (Note: Laos: 300 / Cambodia: 140)	0.6%	440 (Note: Laos: 360 / Cambodia: 80)	0.9%	565 (Note: Laos: 375 / Cambodia: 190)	1.2%	595 (Note: Laos: 495 / Cambodia: 100)	1.1%	610 (Note: Laos: 525 / Cambodia: 85)	1.1%	705 (Note: Laos: 520 / Cambodia: 185)	1%	650	0.8%	—N/a	—N/a	—N/a	—N/a	—N/a	—N/a	—N/a	—N/a	—N/a	—N/a
Sri Lanka	435	0.3%	440	0.4%	185	0.3%	230	0.5%	145	0.3%	160	0.3%	160	0.3%	150	0.2%	120	0.1%	—N/a	—N/a	—N/a	—N/a	—N/a	—N/a	—N/a	—N/a	—N/a	—N/a
Saudi Arabia	415	0.3%	210	0.2%	60	0.1%	50	0.1%	15	0%	0	0%	—N/a	—N/a	—N/a	—N/a	—N/a	—N/a	—N/a	—N/a	—N/a	—N/a	—N/a	—N/a	—N/a	—N/a	—N/a	—N/a
Mauritius	405	0.3%	255	0.2%	165	0.2%	100	0.2%	60	0.1%	35	0.1%	—N/a	—N/a	—N/a	—N/a	—N/a	—N/a	—N/a	—N/a	—N/a	—N/a	—N/a	—N/a	—N/a	—N/a	—N/a	—N/a
Brazil	385	0.3%	185	0.2%	165	0.2%	105	0.2%	145	0.3%	125	0.2%	135	0.2%	15	0%	70	0.1%	—N/a	—N/a	—N/a	—N/a	—N/a	—N/a	—N/a	—N/a	—N/a	—N/a
Scandinavia (Note: Includes Denmark, Finland, Iceland, Norway and Sweden.)	395	0.3%	445	0.4%	550	0.8%	570	1.2%	890	1.9%	1,030	2%	1,645	2.8%	1,840	2.6%	2,685	3.2%	4,970	4.5%	8,321	5.6%	11,084	6.3%	16,244	6.8%	23,124	7.3%
United Arab Emirates	340	0.2%	215	0.2%	45	0.1%	0	0%	50	0.1%	15	0%	—N/a	—N/a	—N/a	—N/a	—N/a	—N/a	—N/a	—N/a	—N/a	—N/a	—N/a	—N/a	—N/a	—N/a	—N/a	—N/a
Hungary	325	0.2%	395	0.4%	295	0.4%	515	1.1%	740	1.5%	770	1.5%	1,125	1.9%	1,370	1.9%	1,795	2.1%	2,665	2.4%	4,044	2.7%	3,808	2.2%	5,510	2.3%	6,884	2.2%
Malaysia & Singapore	250 (Note: Malaysia: 160 / Singapore: 90)	0.2%	165 (Note: Malaysia: 125 / Singapore: 40)	0.1%	210 (Note: Malaysia: 120 / Singapore: 90)	0.3%	255 (Note: Malaysia: 205 / Singapore: 50)	0.5%	195 (Note: Malaysia: 150 / Singapore: 45)	0.4%	160 (Note: Malaysia: 115 / Singapore: 45)	0.3%	125 (Note: Malaysia: 40 / Singapore: 85)	0.2%	130 (Note: Malaysia: 95 / Singapore: 35)	0.2%	—N/a	—N/a	—N/a	—N/a	—N/a	—N/a	—N/a	—N/a	—N/a	—N/a	—N/a	—N/a
Czech Republic & Slovakia	205	0.1%	235	0.2%	195	0.3%	300	0.6%	360	0.8%	545	1%	495	0.9%	655	0.9%	815	1%	1,130	1%	1,408	0.9%	1,427	0.8%	1,997	0.8%	2,389	0.7%
Total immigrants	137,620	12.5%	112,490	10.5%	68,780	6.8%	48,160	5%	47,825	5%	52,315	5.4%	57,815	5.9%	71,990	7.2%	83,655	8.7%	110,690	12%	149,389	16.1%	175,829	21.1%	238,903	26.7%	318,545	34.6%
Total responses	1,103,205	97.4%	1,070,560	97.5%	1,008,760	95.7%	953,850	96.8%	963,150	98.4%	976,615	98.6%	976,040	98.7%	996,700	98.7%	956,440	98.8%	926,245	100%	925,181	100%	831,728	100%	895,992	100%	921,785	100%
Total population	1,132,505	100%	1,098,352	100%	1,053,960	100%	985,386	100%	978,933	100%	990,237	100%	988,928	100%	1,009,613	100%	968,313	100%	926,242	100%	925,181	100%	831,728	100%	895,992	100%	921,785	100%

=== Recent immigration ===
The 2021 Canadian census counted a total of 43,120 people who immigrated to Saskatchewan between 2016 and 2021.

Recent immigrants to Saskatchewan by country of birth (2016 to 2021)
Country of birth	Population	% recent immigrants
Philippines	10,460	24.3%
India	7,940	18.4%
China	3,685	8.5%
Nigeria	3,305	7.7%
Pakistan	1,685	3.9%
Syria	1,240	2.9%
Bangladesh	1,225	2.8%
United States	990	2.3%
Vietnam	865	2%
South Africa	775	1.8%
Ukraine	760	1.8%
United Kingdom	595	1.4%
Eritrea	595	1.4%
Mexico	560	1.3%
Jamaica	560	1.3%
Egypt	385	0.9%
Iran	335	0.8%
Ethiopia	315	0.7%
Iraq	310	0.7%
Sudan	300	0.7%
Democratic Republic of the Congo	290	0.7%
Saudi Arabia	285	0.7%
South Korea	275	0.6%
Mauritius	190	0.4%
United Arab Emirates	190	0.4%
Total recent immigrants	43,120	100%

=== Interprovincial migration ===
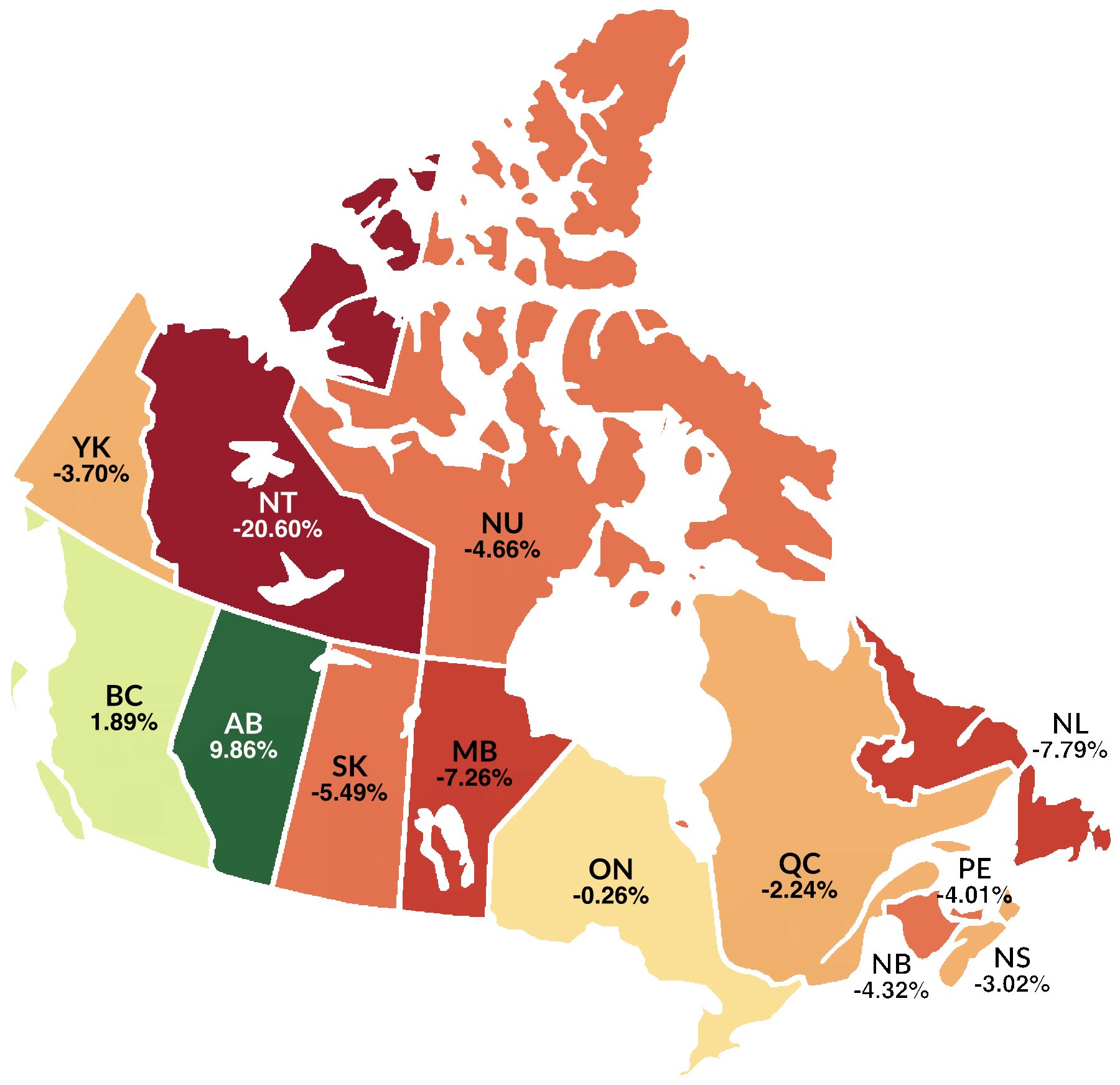
Net cumulative interprovincial migration per Province from 1997 to 2017, as a share of population of each Provinces

Interprovincial migration has long been a demographic challenge for Saskatchewan, and it was often said that "Saskatchewan's most valuable export [was] its young people". The trend reversed in 2006 as the nascent oil fracking industry started growing in the province, but returned to negative net migration starting in 2013. Most people migrating from Saskatchewan move west to Alberta or British Columbia.

Interprovincial migration in Saskatchewan
	In-migrants	Out-migrants	Net migration
2008–09	18,127	15,144	2,983
2009–10	17,237	15,084	2,153
2010–11	16,602	16,057	545
2011–12	19,386	17,508	1,878
2012–13	16,982	16,590	392
2013–14	16,371	18,210	−1,839
2014–15	15,346	19,874	−4,528
2015–16	15,260	19,532	−4,272
2016–17	13,130	18,890	−5,760
2017–18	11,637	20,112	−8,475
2018–19	11,637	23,607	−9,688

Source: Statistics Canada

== See also ==
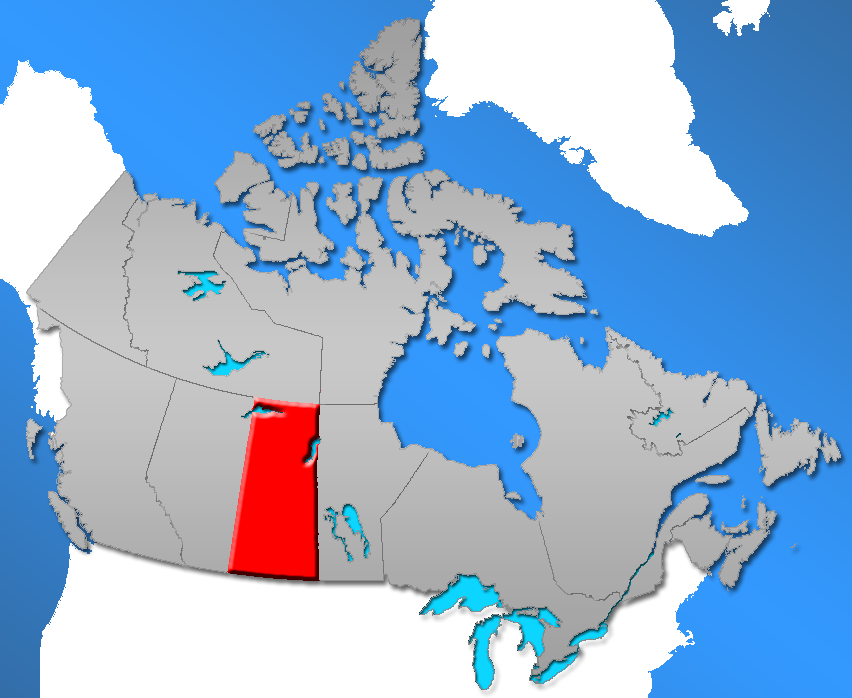
Demographics of Canada's provinces and territories
- Demographics of Canada
- Population of Canada by province and territory
