= 1956 Canadian census =

Detailed enumeration of Canadian residents in 1956

- June 1, 1956

General information
- Country: Canada
- Authority: Dominion Bureau of Statistics

Results
- Total population: 16,080,791 (▲14.8%)
- Most populous province/territory: Ontario (5,404,933)
- Least populous province/territory: Yukon (12,190)

The 1956 Canadian census was a detailed enumeration of the Canadian population. The total population count of Canada was 16,080,791. This was a 14.8% increase over the 1951 census of 14,009,429.

The previous census was the 1951 census and the following census was the 1961 census. This was the tenth nationwide census, and was the first nationwide quinquennial census, superseding the series of special censuses covering only the Canadian Prairies from 1906 to 1946.

== Canada by the numbers ==
A summary of information about Canada.

Total population	16,080,791
Men	8,151,879
Women	7,928,912

== Population by province ==
Rank	Province or territory	Population as of 1956 census	Population as of 1951 census	Change	Percent change
1	Ontario	5,404,933	4,597,542	807,391 ▲	17.6 ▲
2	Quebec	4,628,378	4,055,681	572,697 ▲	14.1 ▲
3	British Columbia	1,398,464	1,165,210	233,254 ▲	20.0 ▲
4	Alberta	1,123,116	939,501	183,615 ▲	19.5 ▲
5	Saskatchewan	880,665	831,728	48,937 ▲	5.9 ▲
6	Manitoba	850,040	776,541	73,499 ▲	9.5 ▲
7	Nova Scotia	694,717	642,584	52,133 ▲	8.1 ▲
8	New Brunswick	554,616	515,697	38,919 ▲	7.5 ▲
9	Newfoundland and Labrador	415,074	361,416	53,658 ▲	14.8 ▲
10	Prince Edward Island	99,285	98,429	856 ▲	0.9 ▲
11	Northwest Territories	19,313	16,004	3,309 ▲	20.7 ▲
12	Yukon	12,190	9,096	3,094 ▲	34.0 ▲
	Canada	16,080,791	14,009,429	2,071,362 ▲	13.4 ▲

A different definition for the Northwest Territories disregards areas not included within the Mackenzie River Electoral District. If such areas were excluded, the Northwest Territories had 12,492 people in 1956 and 10,279 people in 1951. Under this definition, the Northwest Territories saw an increase of 2,403 people, or 19.2%.

All provinces and territories recorded a population increase in this census. With the 1956 census, Alberta became the first province in the Canadian Prairies to have more than 1 million inhabitants.

== See also ==
- Population and housing censuses by country
