= 1906 Canadian census =

← 1901	1906	1911 →

General information
- Country: Canada

The 1906 Canadian census was the first of a series of special censuses conducted by the Government of Canada, covering the rapidly expanding Northwest Provinces of Alberta, Saskatchewan, and Manitoba. These censuses were conducted every ten years from 1906 to 1946.

In the census, a total of 808,863 individuals were identified:

- 365,688 people were enumerated in Manitoba;
- 257,753 people were enumerated in Saskatchewan; and
- 185,412 people were enumerated in Alberta.

No nationwide estimate was provided in the census. Additionally, this was the last census prior to 1966 in which Manitoba had a greater population than Saskatchewan.

The paper records of responses were microfilmed and the original paper forms were destroyed. The microfilm has since been scanned and converted into a series of images which are now available online at the Library and Archives Canada web site.

The previous census was the nationwide 1901 census and the following census was the nationwide 1911 census.

== See also ==
- Population and housing censuses by country
