= 1966 Canadian census =

Detailed enumeration of Canadian residents in 1966

← 1961	June 1, 1966	1971 →

General information
- Country: Canada
- Authority: Dominion Bureau of Statistics

Results
- Total population: 20,014,880 (▲9.7%)
- Most populous province/territory: Ontario (6,960,870)
- Least populous province/territory: Yukon (14,382)

The 1966 Canadian census was a detailed enumeration of the Canadian population. Census day was June 1, 1966. On that day, Statistics Canada attempted to count every person in Canada. The total population count of Canada was 20,014,880. This was a 9.7% increase over the 1961 census of 18,238,247.

The previous census was the 1961 census and the following census was the 1971 census. This was the first census in which Canada recorded a population of more than 20 million, and the first census since 1906 where Manitoba had a larger population than neighbouring Saskatchewan.

This census was the last one conducted by the Dominion Bureau of Statistics prior to its name change to Statistics Canada on August 3, 1971.

== Canada by the numbers ==
A summary of information about Canada.

Total population	20,014,880
Men	10,054,344
Women	9,960,536

== Population by province ==
Rank	Province or territory	Population as of 1966 census	Population as of 1961 census	Change	Percent change
1	Ontario	6,960,870	6,236,092	724,778 ▲	11.6 ▲
2	Quebec	5,780,845	5,259,211	521,634 ▲	9.9 ▲
3	British Columbia	1,873,674	1,629,082	244,592 ▲	15.0 ▲
4	Alberta	1,463,203	1,331,944	131,259 ▲	9.6 ▲
5	Manitoba	963,066	921,686	41,380 ▲	4.5 ▲
6	Saskatchewan	955,344	925,181	30,163 ▲	3.3 ▲
7	Nova Scotia	756,039	737,007	19,032 ▲	2.6 ▲
8	New Brunswick	616,788	597,936	18,852 ▲	3.2 ▲
9	Newfoundland and Labrador	493,396	457,853	35,543 ▲	7.8 ▲
10	Prince Edward Island	108,535	104,629	3,906 ▲	3.7 ▲
11	Northwest Territories	28,738	22,998	5,740 ▲	25.0 ▲
12	Yukon	14,382	14,628	-246 ▼	-1.7 ▼
	Canada	20,014,880	18,238,247	1,776,633 ▲	9.7 ▲

A different population for the Northwest Territories excludes areas not included within the Mackenzie River Electoral District. If such areas were excluded, the Northwest Territories had only 14,895 people in 1961, representing an increase of 13,843 people or 92.9% in 1966.

== See also ==
- Population and housing censuses by country
