= 1911 Canadian census =

- June 1, 1911

General information
- Country: Canada

Results
- Total population: 7,206,643 (▲34.2%)

The 1911 Canadian census was a detailed enumeration of the Canadian population. The census was started on June 1, 1911. All reports had been received by February 26, 1912. The total population count of Canada was 7,206,643. This was an increase of 34% over the 1901 census of 5,371,315.

The previous census was the Northwest Provinces of Alberta, Saskatchewan, and Manitoba 1906 census and the following census was the Northwest Provinces of Alberta, Saskatchewan, and Manitoba 1916 census.

== Census summary ==
Information was collected on the following subjects, with a separate "schedule" or census data collection form associated with each subject:

1. Population
2. Mortality, Disability and Compensation
3. Houses, Buildings and Fruit
4. Agriculture: Field Crops - Grain and Other Field Crops for the Harvest Year 1910
5. Agriculture: Hoed Crops, Tobacco, Hops and Grass Seeds in 1910 and Field Crop Areas in 1911
6. Agriculture: Animal and Animal Products
7. Farm and Urban Values
8. Forest Products
9. Manufactures
10. Churches, Schools, etc.
11. Fisheries
12. Dairy Factories
13. Mineral Products

The 1911 census was the last census to include questions about "infirmities". In 1911, 28,611 people were identified as "infirm":

- 3,238 people as blind
- 4,584 people as deaf and unable to speak ("deaf and dumb")
- 14,702 people as insane ("crazy or lunatic")
- 5,387 people as "idiotic" or "feeble-minded" ("idiotic or silly")

People who were deaf but able to speak were not classified as infirm.

== Population by province ==
Province	1911 census	1901 census	% change
Prince Edward Island	93,728	103,259	-9.2
Nova Scotia	492,338	459,574	7.1
New Brunswick	351,889	331,120	6.3
Quebec	2,005,776	1,648,898	21.6
Ontario	2,527,292	2,182,947	15.8
Manitoba	461,394	255,211	80.8
Saskatchewan	492,432	91,279	439.5
Alberta	374,295	73,022	412.6
British Columbia	392,480	178,657	119.7
Yukon Territory	8,512	27,219	-68.7
Northwest Territories	6,507	20,129	-67.7
Total	7,206,643	5,371,315	34.2

== Methodology ==
The census was conducted by the Canadian Ministry of Agriculture under the authority of the Census and Statistics Act of 1905. 9,703 enumerators visited homes across the country, asked the required questions and recorded the responses from each household onto paper forms. For the census, each province or territory was subdivided into districts, usually based on electoral districts, cities or counties, which were in turn divided into sub-districts, which were towns, townships, city wards or parishes. One handwritten line in English or French was entered for each person enumerated. The responses were collected, tabulated and summary statistics were produced. In 1955, the paper records of responses were microfilmed and the original paper forms were destroyed. The microfilm has since been scanned and converted into a series of images which are now available online at the Library and Archives Canada web site.

== See also ==
- Population of Canada by year
- Demographics of Canada
- Ethnic groups in Canada
- History of immigration to Canada
- Population and housing censuses by country
