= 1961 Canadian census =

Detailed enumeration of Canadian residents in 1961

- June 16, 1961

General information
- Country: Canada
- Authority: Dominion Bureau of Statistics

Results
- Total population: 18,238,247 (▲13.4%)
- Most populous province/territory: Ontario (6,236,092)
- Least populous province/territory: Yukon (14,628)

The 1961 Canadian census was a detailed enumeration of the Canadian population. Census day was June 16, 1961. On that day, Statistics Canada attempted to count every person in Canada. The total population count of Canada was 18,238,247. This was a 13.4% increase over the 1956 census of 16,080,791.

The previous census was the 1956 census and the following census was the 1966 census. This was the first census since 1901 in which all then-admitted provinces recorded a population of at least 100,000, and the last in which Saskatchewan had a larger population than neighbouring Manitoba.

== Canada by the numbers ==
A summary of information about Canada.

Total population	18,238,247
Men	9,218,893
Women	9,019,354

== Population by province ==
Rank	Province or territory	Population as of 1961 census	Population as of 1956 census	Change	Percent change
1	Ontario	6,236,092	5,404,933	831,159 ▲	15.4 ▲
2	Quebec	5,259,211	4,628,378	630,833 ▲	13.6 ▲
3	British Columbia	1,629,082	1,398,464	230,618 ▲	16.5 ▲
4	Alberta	1,331,944	1,123,116	208,828 ▲	18.6 ▲
5	Saskatchewan	925,181	880,665	44,516 ▲	5.1 ▲
6	Manitoba	921,686	850,040	71,646 ▲	8.4 ▲
7	Nova Scotia	737,007	694,717	42,290 ▲	6.1 ▲
8	New Brunswick	597,936	554,616	43,320 ▲	7.8 ▲
9	Newfoundland and Labrador	457,853	415,074	42,779 ▲	10.3 ▲
10	Prince Edward Island	104,629	99,285	5,344 ▲	5.4 ▲
11	Northwest Territories	22,998	19,313	3,685 ▲	19.1 ▲
12	Yukon	14,628	12,190	2,438 ▲	20.0 ▲
	Canada	18,238,247	16,080,791	2,157,416 ▲	13.4 ▲

A different definition for the Northwest Territories disregards areas not included within the Mackenzie River Electoral District. If such areas were excluded, the Northwest Territories had 14,895 people in 1961 and 12,492 people in 1956. Under this definition, the Northwest Territories saw an increase of 2,403 people, or 19.2%.

== Ethnic group ==
Major ethnic groups in Canada by province/territory (1961 census)
Ethnic group	Canada		ON		QC		BC		AB		SK		MB		NS		NB		NL		PE		NT		YT	
Ethnic group	Pop.	%	Pop.	%	Pop.	%	Pop.	%	Pop.	%	Pop.	%	Pop.	%	Pop.	%	Pop.	%	Pop.	%	Pop.	%	Pop.	%	Pop.	%
French	5,540,346	30.38%	647,941	10.39%	4,241,354	80.65%	66,970	4.11%	83,319	6.26%	59,824	6.47%	83,936	9.11%	87,883	11.92%	232,127	38.82%	17,171	3.75%	17,418	16.65%	1,412	6.14%	991	6.77%
English	4,195,175	23%	1,939,867	31.11%	322,410	6.13%	518,010	31.8%	282,964	21.24%	170,296	18.41%	184,607	20.03%	241,020	32.7%	158,590	26.52%	342,070	74.71%	30,191	28.86%	2,039	8.87%	3,111	21.27%
Scottish	1,902,302	10.43%	835,590	13.4%	109,937	2.09%	255,627	15.69%	165,942	12.46%	102,685	11.1%	119,299	12.94%	182,823	24.81%	84,082	14.06%	9,902	2.16%	32,940	31.48%	1,525	6.63%	1,950	13.33%
Irish	1,753,351	9.61%	873,647	14.01%	129,326	2.46%	165,631	10.17%	134,102	10.07%	92,133	9.96%	84,726	9.19%	93,998	12.75%	82,485	13.79%	74,791	16.34%	19,786	18.91%	1,056	4.59%	1,670	11.42%
German–Austrian	1,156,134	6.34%	435,205	6.98%	46,880	0.89%	137,010	8.41%	199,218	14.96%	177,192	19.15%	102,256	11.09%	46,038	6.25%	7,612	1.27%	1,937	0.42%	706	0.67%	805	3.5%	1,275	8.72%
Ukrainian	473,337	2.6%	127,911	2.05%	16,588	0.32%	35,640	2.19%	105,923	7.95%	78,851	8.52%	105,372	11.43%	1,763	0.24%	379	0.06%	141	0.03%	66	0.06%	358	1.56%	345	2.36%
Italian	450,351	2.47%	273,864	4.39%	108,552	2.06%	38,399	2.36%	15,025	1.13%	2,413	0.26%	6,476	0.7%	3,719	0.5%	1,210	0.2%	246	0.05%	103	0.1%	144	0.63%	200	1.37%
Scandinavian–Nordic	445,970	2.45%	103,559	1.66%	13,572	0.26%	106,829	6.56%	99,541	7.47%	69,444	7.51%	38,816	4.21%	5,985	0.81%	5,066	0.85%	1,237	0.27%	443	0.42%	633	2.75%	845	5.78%
Dutch	429,679	2.36%	191,017	3.06%	10,442	0.2%	60,176	3.69%	55,530	4.17%	29,325	3.17%	47,780	5.18%	25,251	3.43%	7,882	1.32%	462	0.1%	1,288	1.23%	177	0.77%	349	2.39%
Polish	323,517	1.77%	149,524	2.4%	30,790	0.59%	24,870	1.53%	40,539	3.04%	28,951	3.13%	44,371	4.81%	3,106	0.42%	633	0.11%	243	0.05%	82	0.08%	167	0.73%	241	1.65%
Indigenous	220,121	1.21%	48,074	0.77%	21,343	0.41%	38,814	2.38%	28,554	2.14%	30,630	3.31%	29,427	3.19%	3,271	0.44%	2,921	0.49%	1,411	0.31%	236	0.23%	13,233	57.54%	2,207	15.09%
Jewish	173,344	0.95%	65,280	1.05%	74,677	1.42%	5,113	0.31%	4,353	0.33%	2,287	0.25%	18,898	2.05%	1,672	0.23%	859	0.14%	180	0.04%	15	0.01%	10	0.04%	0	0%
Welsh	143,942	0.79%	61,678	0.99%	5,285	0.1%	27,159	1.67%	18,522	1.39%	8,261	0.89%	7,594	0.82%	7,577	1.03%	4,776	0.8%	2,136	0.47%	584	0.56%	157	0.68%	213	1.46%
Hungarian	126,220	0.69%	59,427	0.95%	15,561	0.3%	12,833	0.79%	15,293	1.15%	16,059	1.74%	5,443	0.59%	827	0.11%	412	0.07%	73	0.02%	15	0.01%	61	0.27%	216	1.48%
Russian	119,168	0.65%	28,327	0.45%	13,694	0.26%	27,448	1.68%	17,952	1.35%	22,481	2.43%	7,938	0.86%	804	0.11%	305	0.05%	67	0.01%	14	0.01%	37	0.16%	101	0.69%
Czechoslovak	73,061	0.4%	33,332	0.53%	7,381	0.14%	8,482	0.52%	12,448	0.93%	5,854	0.63%	4,525	0.49%	711	0.1%	138	0.02%	40	0.01%	27	0.03%	57	0.25%	66	0.45%
Yugoslav	68,587	0.38%	43,564	0.7%	5,577	0.11%	8,561	0.53%	5,329	0.4%	2,420	0.26%	2,448	0.27%	380	0.05%	114	0.02%	11	0%	4	0%	58	0.25%	121	0.83%
Baltic	64,373	0.35%	42,105	0.68%	9,310	0.18%	4,667	0.29%	3,903	0.29%	981	0.11%	2,019	0.22%	727	0.1%	332	0.06%	210	0.05%	24	0.02%	39	0.17%	56	0.38%
Belgian	61,382	0.34%	22,142	0.36%	12,092	0.23%	4,948	0.3%	5,152	0.39%	5,464	0.59%	9,698	1.05%	1,267	0.17%	447	0.07%	39	0.01%	31	0.03%	50	0.22%	52	0.36%
Chinese	58,197	0.32%	15,155	0.24%	4,749	0.09%	24,227	1.49%	6,937	0.52%	3,660	0.4%	1,936	0.21%	637	0.09%	274	0.05%	445	0.1%	43	0.04%	34	0.15%	100	0.68%
Greek	56,475	0.31%	29,062	0.47%	19,390	0.37%	3,124	0.19%	1,774	0.13%	809	0.09%	1,199	0.13%	827	0.11%	177	0.03%	43	0.01%	6	0.01%	52	0.23%	12	0.08%
European, n.o.s.	51,446 (Note: Including 21,734 respondents specifying Portuguese ethnic origin, of which 12,079 were located in Ontario, 4,495 in Quebec, 2,910 in British Columbia, 1,566 in the Prairies, 659 in Atlantic Canada, and 25 in Northern Canada.)	0.28%	29,984	0.48%	10,000	0.19%	5,187	0.32%	2,003	0.15%	879	0.1%	1,332	0.14%	1,332	0.18%	424	0.07%	195	0.04%	30	0.03%	36	0.16%	44	0.3%
Romanian	43,805	0.24%	15,787	0.25%	7,101	0.14%	4,455	0.27%	6,806	0.51%	7,128	0.77%	1,968	0.21%	322	0.04%	140	0.02%	30	0.01%	5	0%	24	0.1%	39	0.27%
African/Black	32,127	0.18%	11,062	0.18%	4,287	0.08%	1,012	0.06%	1,307	0.1%	285	0.03%	920	0.1%	11,900	1.61%	1,273	0.21%	19	0%	48	0.05%	7	0.03%	7	0.05%
Japanese	29,157	0.16%	11,870	0.19%	1,459	0.03%	10,424	0.64%	3,721	0.28%	280	0.03%	1,296	0.14%	28	0%	18	0%	3	0%	0	0%	26	0.11%	32	0.22%
Syrian–Lebanese	19,374	0.11%	7,137	0.11%	5,302	0.1%	530	0.03%	1,327	0.1%	678	0.07%	590	0.06%	2,153	0.29%	984	0.16%	417	0.09%	240	0.23%	4	0.02%	12	0.08%
Asian, n.o.s.	8,251	0.05%	3,960	0.06%	2,808	0.05%	592	0.04%	310	0.02%	192	0.02%	157	0.02%	115	0.02%	45	0.01%	51	0.01%	11	0.01%	3	0.01%	7	0.05%
Indian (South Asian)	6,774	0.04%	1,155	0.02%	483	0.01%	4,526	0.28%	208	0.02%	115	0.01%	198	0.02%	46	0.01%	22	0%	17	0%	1	0%	2	0.01%	1	0.01%
British Isles, n.o.s.	1,899	0.01%	754	0.01%	99	0%	454	0.03%	225	0.02%	107	0.01%	219	0.02%	30	0%	7	0%	0	0%	0	0%	2	0.01%	2	0.01%
Other & Not Stated	210,382	1.15%	128,112	2.05%	8,762	0.17%	27,364	1.68%	13,717	1.03%	5,497	0.59%	6,242	0.68%	10,795	1.46%	4,202	0.7%	4,266	0.93%	272	0.26%	790	3.44%	363	2.48%
Total population	18,238,247	100%	6,236,092	100%	5,259,211	100%	1,629,082	100%	1,331,944	100%	925,181	100%	921,686	100%	737,007	100%	597,936	100%	457,853	100%	104,629	100%	22,998	100%	14,628	100%
At the time of the 1961 census, Canada comprised 12 major administrative units; ten provinces and two territories.

== See also ==
- Population and housing censuses by country
