= 1901 Canadian census =

Detailed enumeration of Canadian residents in 1901

- June 1, 1901

General information
- Country: Canada

Results
- Total population: 5,371,315 (▲11.1%)

The fourth national census was taken on March 31, 1901. It had 561 questions.

The 1901 Canadian census was a detailed enumeration of the Canadian population. The census began on June 1, 1901 and all reports were received by February 26, 1902. The total population count of Canada was 5,371,315. This was an increase of 11% over the 1891 census of 4,833,239.

The previous census was the 1891 census and the following census was the Northwest Provinces of Alberta, Saskatchewan, and Manitoba 1906 census. This census was the first census in which all then-admitted provinces recorded a population of at least 100,000, which would not be replicated until 1961.

== Census summary ==
Information was collected on the following subjects, with eleven "schedules" or census data collection forms associated with each subject:

1. Living persons
2. Buildings and lands, churches, and schools
3. Deaths
4. Farm land, fruits and plantations
5. Field products
6. Live stock and animal products
7. Agricultural values
8. Manufactures
9. Forest products and furs
10. Fisheries
11. Mines

== Canada by the numbers ==
A summary of information about Canada.

Total population	5,371,315
Houses	1,028,892
Families	1,070,747
Men	2,751,708
Women	2,619,607
Urban population	3,349,516
Rural population	2,021,799

== Population by province ==
Province	1901 census	1891 census	% change
Ontario	2,182,947	2,114,321	3.2
Quebec	1,648,898	1,488,535	10.8
Nova Scotia	459,574	450,396	2.0
New Brunswick	331,120	321,263	3.1
Manitoba	255,211	152,506	67.3
British Columbia	178,657	98,173	82.0
Prince Edward Island	103,259	109,078	-5.3
Assiniboia Territory	67,385	30,372	121.9
Alberta Territory	65,876	25,277	160.6
Saskatchewan Territory	25,679	11,150	130.3
Unorganized Territories	52,709	32,168	63.9
Total	5,371,315	4,833,239	11.1

Yukon, then one of six districts of the Unorganized Territories, was first enumerated in this census, with a population of 27,219. Its demographics would not recover until 1991.

== City rankings ==
All cities and towns with a population of 7,000 or above are included.

Rank	City or Town	Province	Population (1901)
01	Montreal	Quebec	267,730
02	Toronto	Ontario	208,040
03	Quebec	Quebec	68,840
04	Ottawa	Ontario	59,928
05	Hamilton	Ontario	52,634
06	Winnipeg	Manitoba	42,340
07	Halifax	Nova Scotia	40,832
08	St. John	New Brunswick	40,711
09	London	Ontario	37,981
10	Vancouver	British Columbia	26,133
11	St. Henri	Quebec	21,192
12	Victoria	British Columbia	20,816
13	Kingston	Ontario	17,961
14	Brantford	Ontario	16,619
15	Hull	Quebec	13,993
16	Windsor	Ontario	12,153
17	Charlottetown	Prince Edward Island	12,080
18	Sherbrooke	Quebec	11,765
19	Guelph	Ontario	11,496
20	St. Thomas	Ontario	11,485
21	Peterborough	Ontario	11,239
22	Valleyfield	Quebec	11,055
23	St. Louis du Mile End	Quebec	10,933
24	Ste. Cunégonde	Quebec	10,912
25	Trois-Rivières	Quebec	9,981
26	Stratford	Ontario	9,959
27	St. Catharines	Ontario	9,946
28	Sydney	Nova Scotia	9,909
29	Berlin	Ontario	9,747
30	St. Hyacinthe	Quebec	9,210
31	Dawson	Yukon	9,142
32	Belleville	Ontario	9,117
33	Chatham	Ontario	9,068
34	Moncton	New Brunswick	9,026
35	Brockville	Ontario	8,940
36	Westmount	Quebec	8,856
37	Woodstock	Woodstock	8,833
38	Owen Sound	Ontario	8,776
39	Sarnia	Ontario	8,176
40	Galt	Ontario	7,866
41	Lévis	Quebec	7,783
42	Sault Ste. Marie	Ontario	7,169
43	Fredericton	New Brunswick	7,117
44	Sorel	Quebec	7,057
45	Lindsay	Ontario	7,003

== See also ==
- Population of Canada by year
- Demographics of Canada
- Ethnic groups in Canada
- History of immigration to Canada
- Population and housing censuses by country
